= Harvestehuder Weg =

Street in Hamburg, Germany

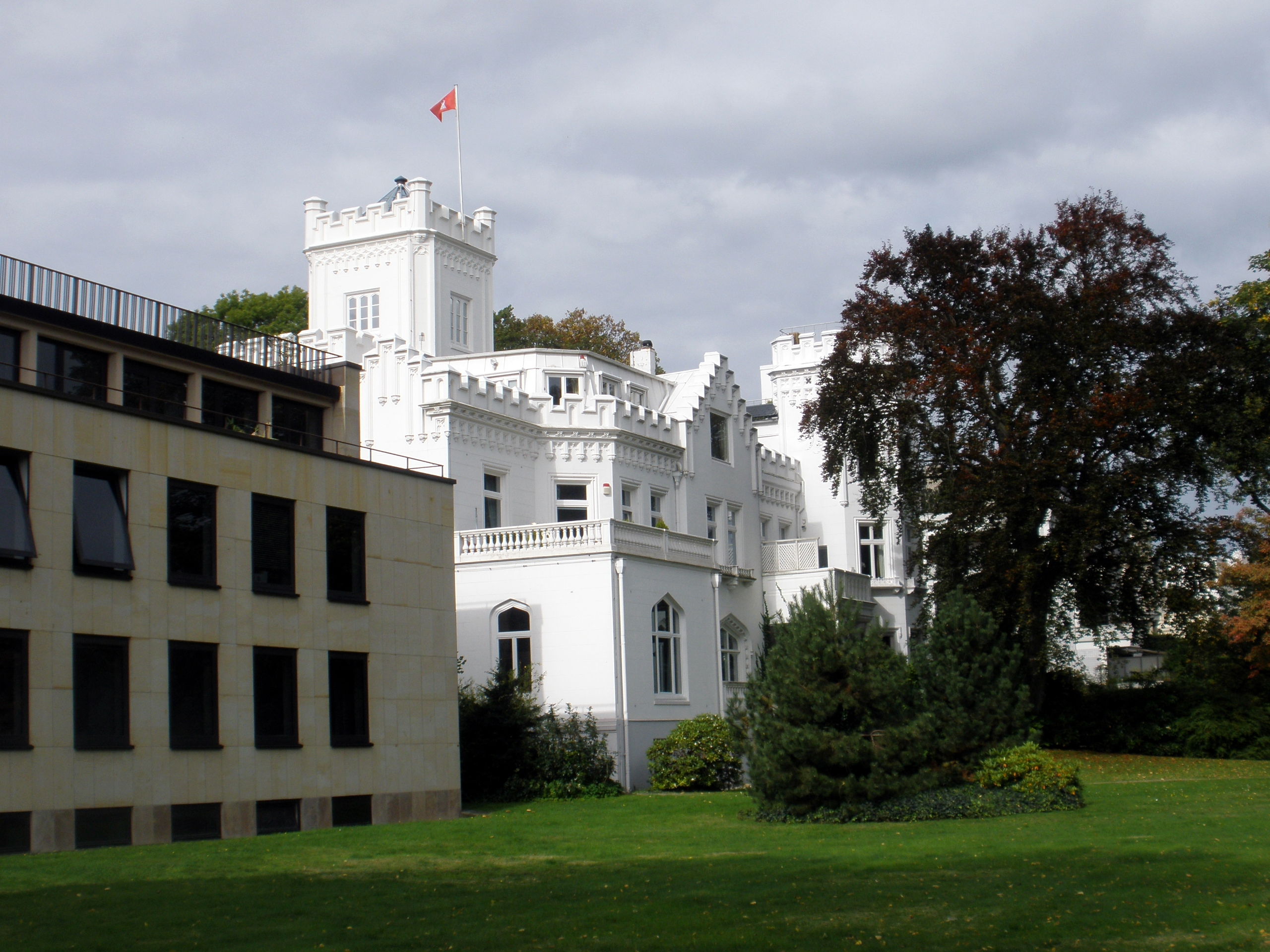
The beginning of the Harvestehuder Weg from the direction of Hamburg's inner city

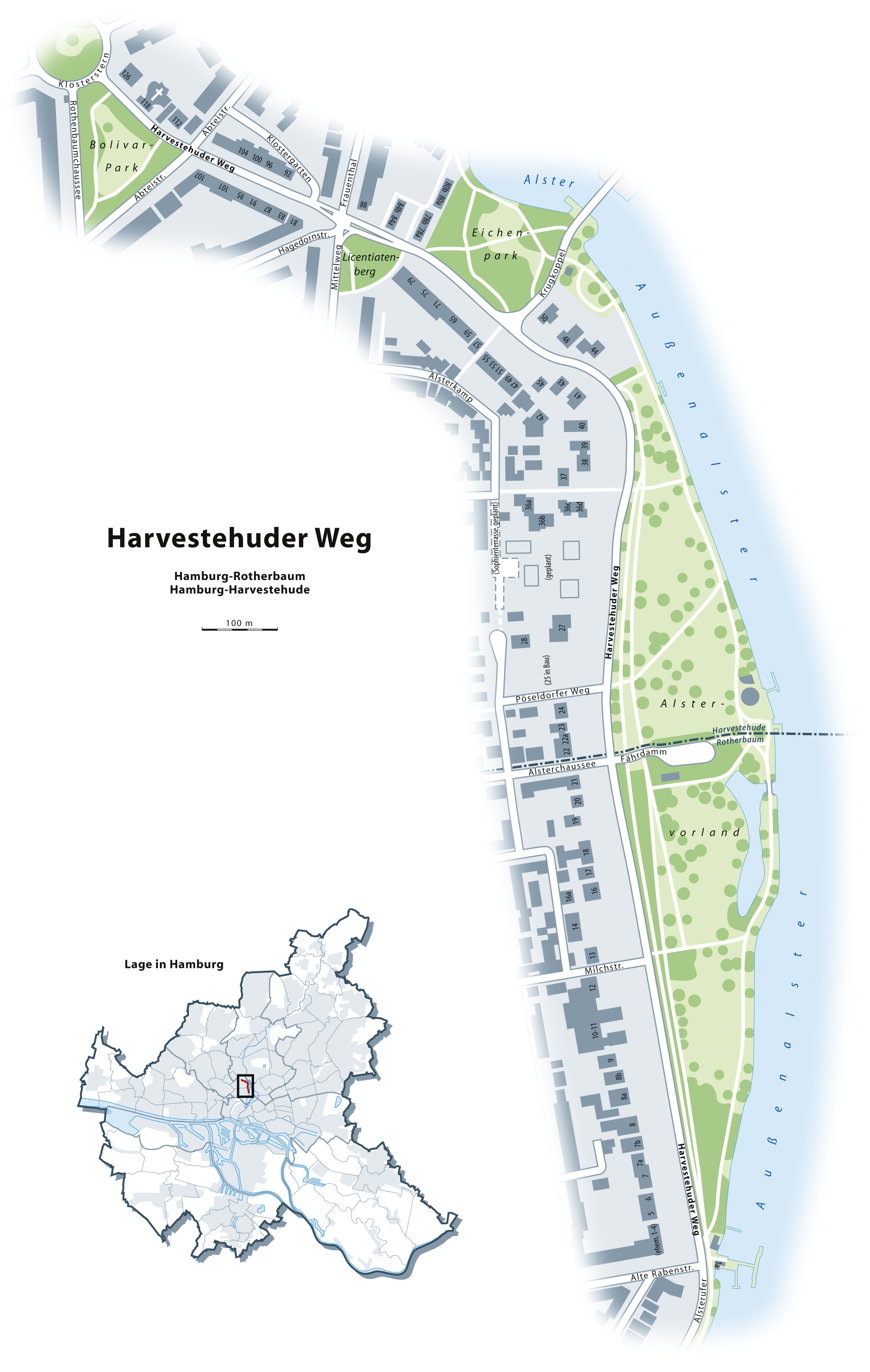
Map of the Harvestehuder Weg in Hamburg

The Harvestehuder Weg is a street in the Hamburg district of Eimsbüttel, which runs along the foreshore of the Outer Alster Lake from Alte Rabenstraße to Klosterstern for a length of two kilometers through the quarters of Rotherbaum and Harvestehude. With numerous detached villas from the late 19th and early 20th centuries, amidst large, partly park-like gardens, it is regarded as one of the grand avenues of the Hanseatic city and, alongside the Elbchaussee, as a testament to the wealth of Hamburg's merchants and entrepreneurs during the Gründerzeit.

The street is built up on only one side in large parts and thus allows, insofar as the rich tree population permits, views over the adjacent extensive green spaces and the Outer Alster Lake. It also enjoys additional attractiveness due to its proximity to the inner city. High square meter prices for plots, apartments, and houses make the Harvestehuder Weg one of the most expensive residential streets in Germany. As early as the middle of the 19th century, the street, with its initial development of country houses and summer residences of wealthy Hamburg families in what was then an area outside the city, occupied an outstanding position. It was subject to urban and social-historical upheavals in politics and the economy and reflects in its history the rise and fall of the respective holders of power and money, the so-called Pfeffersäcke in Hamburg.

== General ==
=== Name ===
The name, administratively registered in 1858, refers to the path to the former Harvestehude Abbey, which lay from 1293 to 1530 northwest of the present-day Eichenpark. It traces back to the place Herwardeshude, the former location of the abbey at the Pepermölenbek near what was later Altona. In literal translation, the meaning would be ferry point (Hude) of the army guardian (Herward), although Herward was an extremely common name in the region in the 12th and 13th centuries, so the obvious assumption that a certain Herward founded the landing site there is widely found in the literature. After the relocation to the Alster, the nuns called their abbey “In valle virginum” (Virgin Valley), but the popular name remained Die Frauen von Herwardeshude, from which the name Harvestehude eventually developed through linguistic change and wordplay. The Hamburg historian and saga writer Otto Beneke further explained that this place “many a good Hamburger, since a Winterhude lies opposite, also calls Herbstehude, and not so erroneously, for ‘Harvest’ is the Low German word for autumn.” On old maps, the name Herbstehude is also partially recorded. Before the official designation, the Harvestehuder Weg was also called Unterer Fahrweg, in distinction to the parallel Oberer (Rothenbaumchaussee) and Mittlerer (Mittelweg) Fahrwege.

=== Location ===
City map section of Hamburg, Outer and Inner Alster

The Harvestehuder Weg is the extension of the street Alsterufer coming from the direction of Hamburg's Neustadt and lies on the geest slope of the western shore of the Outer Alster. It begins one kilometer from the inner city area and passes through the quarters of Rotherbaum, north of the former garden house colony Fontenay, and Harvestehude, along the city district Pöseldorf, up to Klosterstern. Until the beginning of the 20th century, the street was separated from Fontenay by the inflow of the Hundebeck into the Alster; access from the city direction, coming from Dammtor, ran via the Mittelweg and Alte Rabenstraße. The Alster foreshore on the eastern side of the street is publicly accessible along its entire length with the Alsterpark laid out in 1953. With the Krugkoppelbrücke at the northern end of the Outer Alster, there is a connection to the eastern quarters of Winterhude and Uhlenhorst. The area west of the Harvestehuder Weg is the Alsterkamp, a geest height that extends between the Isebek and Alster up to Grindelberg, still clearly recognizable in today's Hamburg city map as an oval through the street lines Grindelallee / Edmund-Siemers-Allee and Alsterufer / Harvestehuder Weg.

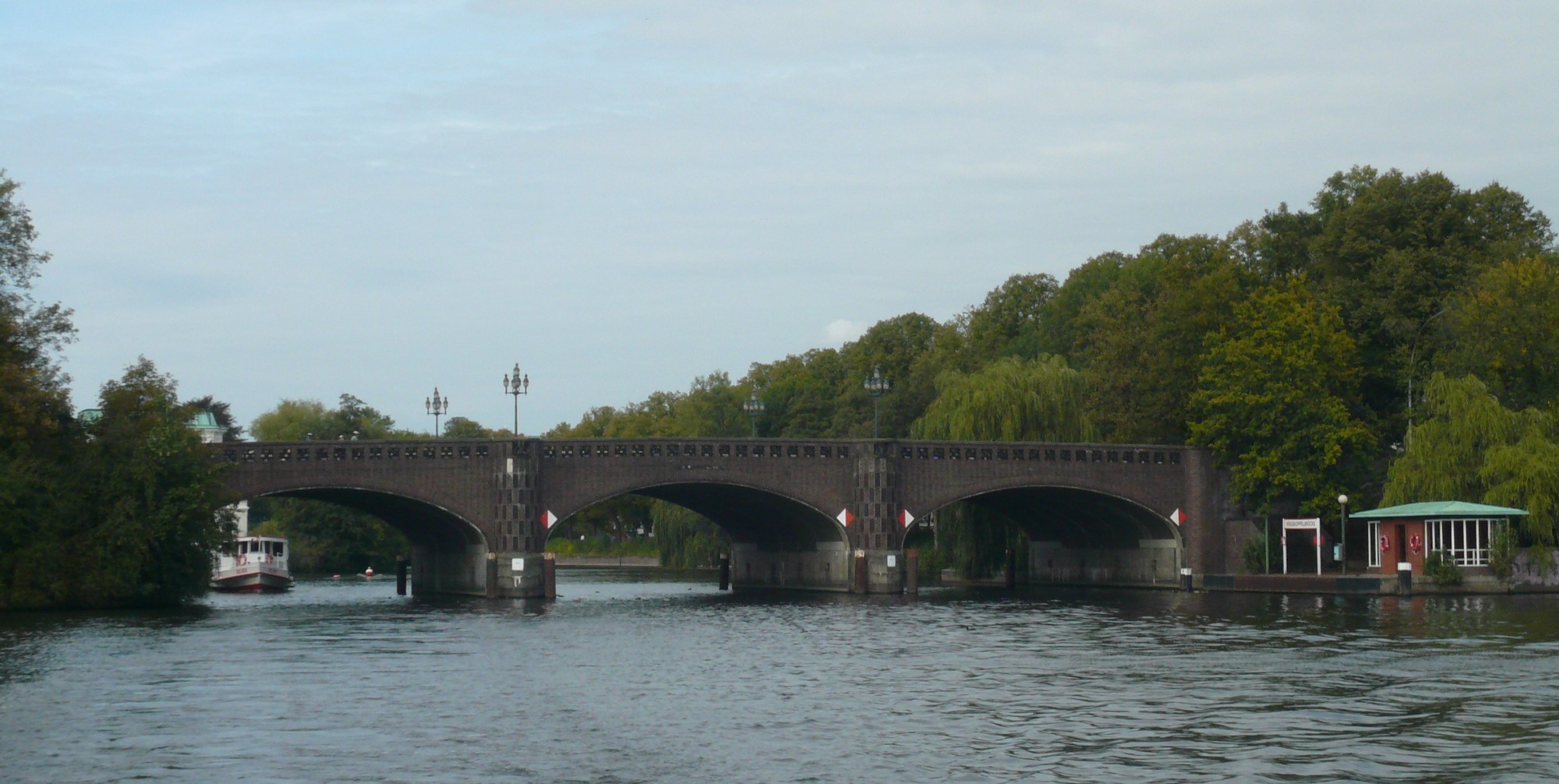
The south side of the Krugkoppelbrücke at the northwest end of the Outer Alster.

In part, the properties of the Harvestehuder Weg are accessed from the rear via the parallel and cross-running streets of this area, such as Magdalenenstraße, Milchstraße, Pöseldorfer Weg, Alfred-Beit-Weg, Sophienterrasse, and Alsterkamp. North of the path lies the site of the former nunnery Herwardeshude, extending to the Isebekkanal, which is reflected in numerous street names in the quarter. In addition to Klosterstern, Klosterstieg, and Klostergarten, the names Frauenthal, Jungfrauenthal, and Nonnenstieg, St. Benedictstraße in honor of Saint Benedict, the patron saint of the abbey, and Heilwigstraße in memory of the founder of the abbey, Heilwig of Holstein and Schauenburg, wife of Adolf IV., refer back to this origin.

=== Course ===
The Harvestehuder Weg begins in the Rotherbaum quarter at Alte Rabenstraße with the eponymous boat landing for Alster steamers. For a length of well over one kilometer, the Alsterpark runs along the eastern side of the street. The elevated terrain of the western street side opposite the park is mainly developed with detached villas in generous garden layouts from the 19th and early 20th centuries, occasionally also with flat office complexes from the 1930s and 1960s as well as residential complexes of more recent times.

Between houses number 12, the present-day Hochschule für Musik und Theater, and number 13, the Milchstraße of the Pöseldorf quarter joins. Behind the intersection with Alsterchaussee and its extension Fährdamms, at the level of house numbers 22 and 23, runs the quarter boundary between Rotherbaum and Harvestehude. In front of property number 25, the Pöseldorfer Weg meets the street, at the level of number 36 the Sophienterrasse. Subsequently, the street describes a pronounced bend around the height of the Sophienterrasse and turns in a northwesterly direction into the interior of the Harvestehude quarter. Here, at the end of the Alsterpark, are the first three buildings on the right street side outbound. Behind them, a street branches off to the Krugkoppelbrücke and separates the Alster foreshore from the Eichenpark. Up to this point, the section, due to the flat, open side to the river, is also called the wet part of the Harvestehuder Weg, in contrast to the following dry part, which leads from the Alster lowland to slightly elevated geest terrain. After just under two hundred meters, the Eichenpark ends with development by two-story rental houses from the 1960s.

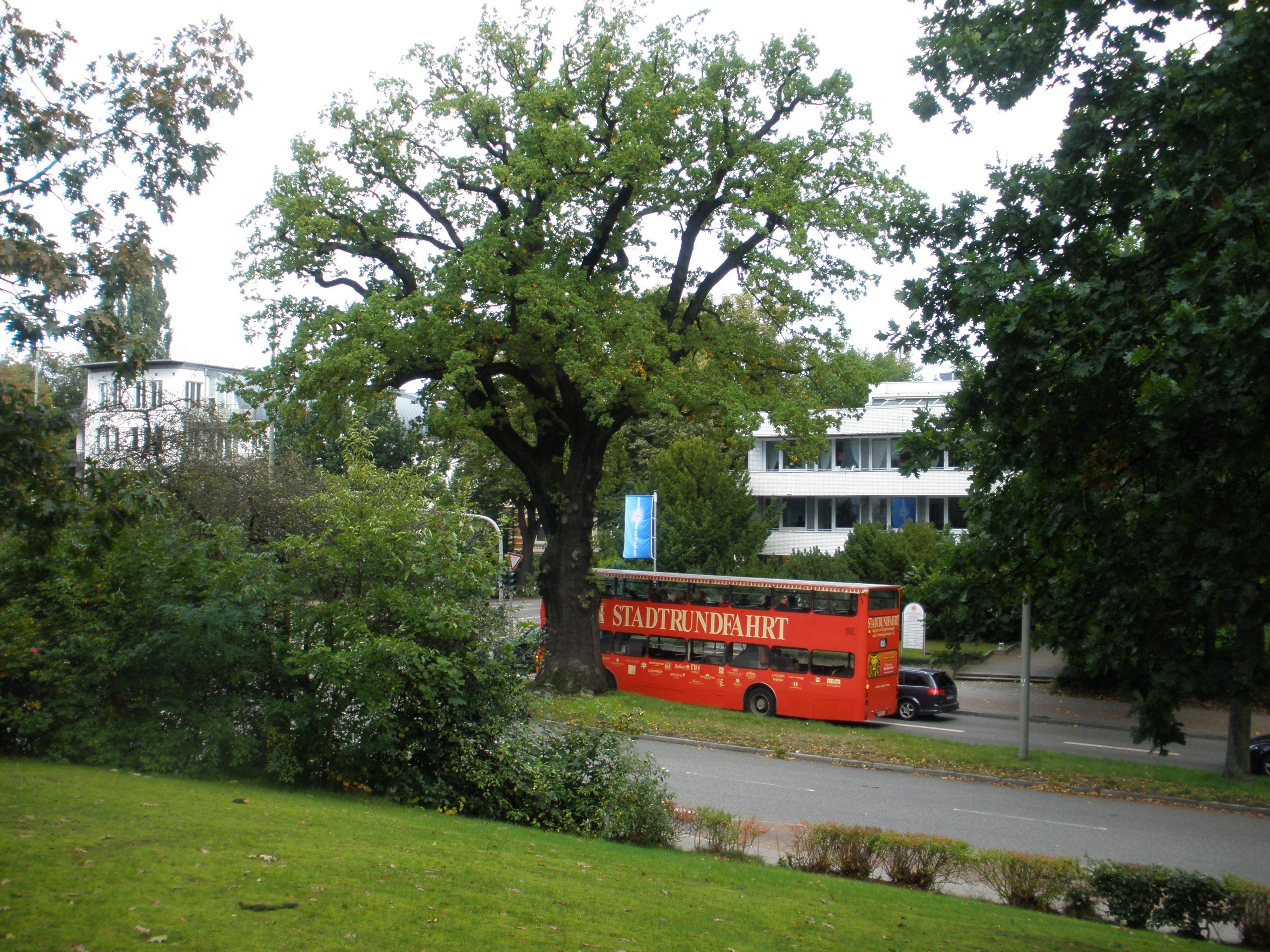
View from Licentiatenberg, Harvestehuder Weg before the intersection with Mittelweg

The left street side from house number 57 is dominated by two- to three-story row villas and apartment buildings from the Gründerzeit, interspersed with row houses and residential complexes of more recent times. They form a sectionally closed development, the front gardens are far narrower than those in the front section of the Harvestehuder Weg. Behind the left-side Licentiatenberg, on which a small park with old tree stock is also laid out, the Mittelweg and Frauenthal cross the street, and the Hagedornstraße and after fifty meters the Klostergarten join, forming an elongated traffic junction. After the intersection of Abteistraße, the Bolivar-Park is laid out on the left side in the last street section. On the right street side is the Harvestehude St. Nikolai Church. The Harvestehuder Weg ends after a total of two kilometers at Klosterstern, a large-scale roundabout, into which a total of six streets join.

=== Demographics ===
Rotherbaum and especially Harvestehude are regarded both historically and currently as two of the highest-income and socially most developed quarters in Hamburg. The income of the wage and income tax payers living here is well over twice the Hamburg average. The Harvestehuder Weg with its exposed location and development has formed the visible representation of the rich to multimillionaire Hamburg merchant since the 19th century and, according to a survey by the magazine Capital in June 2010, is the most expensive residential street in Germany. Accordingly, purchase prices for single-family homes range between five and fifteen million euros, the square meter price for condominiums between 6,500 and 13,500 euros, and the rental price of apartments at 22 to 24 euros per square meter. With the new construction projects on the Harvestehuder Weg, a further increase in price development is planned, so the sales price of a condominium in the Sophienterrasse construction project is to be up to 15,000 euros per square meter.

=== Environmental protection ===
Administratively, the Harvestehuder Weg has been subject to a variety of protection provisions and restrictions since the first development plans of 1899/1906, especially the urban preservation ordinances according to § 172 para. 1 no. 1 of the Building Code. According to the Land Use Plan for the Free and Hanseatic City of Hamburg of October 22, 1997, it is a pure “residential area with two-story open construction”, a so-called W2o area, in which limited commercial use is provided only for office buildings by way of exception and subject to compliance with the number of stories. Furthermore, for the street according to the Landscape Program including Species and Biotope Protection Program for the Free and Hanseatic City of Hamburg of July 14, 1997, “garden-related living with green quality assurance” is provided, in which “open residential development with species-rich biotope elements and park-like structures” predominates. In addition, the Outer Alster Ordinance of March 29, 1953, according to which the areas bordering the Alster foreshore must be uniformly designed in terms of construction and the garden layouts must fit into the surroundings, insight into the garden must not be denied by hedges or high fences, and no foreign advertising may be attached. For the rich and partly very old tree population, primarily lindens, beeches, oaks, and horse chestnuts, the Tree Protection Ordinance of Hamburg state law of September 17, 1948 also applies. Some distinctive individual trees are under the protection status worthy of preservation.

=== Traffic ===
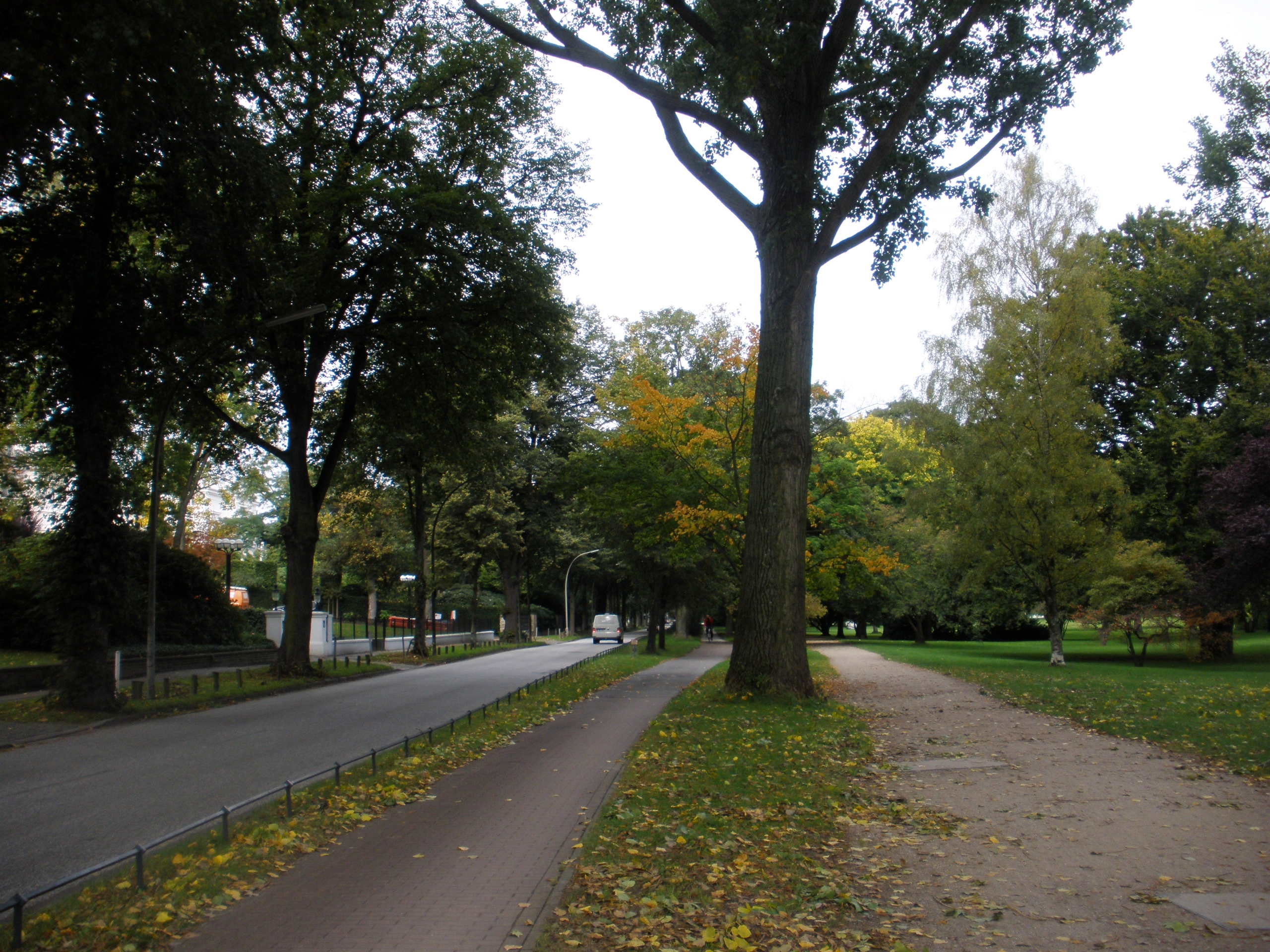
Street situation at the Alster foreshore (2010)

In the section between Alte Rabenstraße and Krugkoppelbrücke, the Harvestehuder Weg was designed as a bicycle street in 2014. To restrict traffic, some points were narrowed by marked parking spaces. In the intersection areas with the Krugkoppelbrücke and Mittelweg, it is partially expanded to four lanes, from Mittelweg to Klosterstern it is two lanes again. Traffic volume is in the medium range, as the urban main traffic flow uses the parallel Mittelweg.

No lines of public transport run through the street itself, but at the intersection of Mittelweg and Frauenthal, it is served by a stop of the crossing bus line 19. This was introduced in 1974 instead of the tram lines 9 or 19 that had run over the Mittelweg since 1895. The nearest subway station is Klosterstern. Until 1984, the Alster steamers also ran within the Hamburger Verkehrsverbund in scheduled service. Three lines docked at Anleger Rabenstraße, the ships of the main line also stopped at Anleger Krugkoppelbrücke. At Fährdamm there was also a connection to the Uhlenhorster Fährhaus. Since the discontinuation of public Alster traffic, Alster-Touristik GmbH offers so-called Alster cruises. The Alster steamers serve the still existing landings on the Alster foreshore.

On the right street side outbound, there are generous and separated foot and cycle paths along the Alsterpark; the cycle path between Alte Rabenstraße and Krugkoppel is used in both directions, as there is no cycle traffic facility on the opposite, inbound street side. The footpath there is partially unpaved and consistently tree-lined. From the Krugkoppelbrücke and especially in the intersection area Mittelweg/Frauenthal/Hagedornstraße, a bilateral cycle traffic guidance is laid out, marked with red path surfacing and equipped with its own traffic lights. Between the junction of Klostergarten street and Klosterstern, there is no cycle path on both sides, but cycle traffic is partially permitted on the pedestrian paths.

== History ==
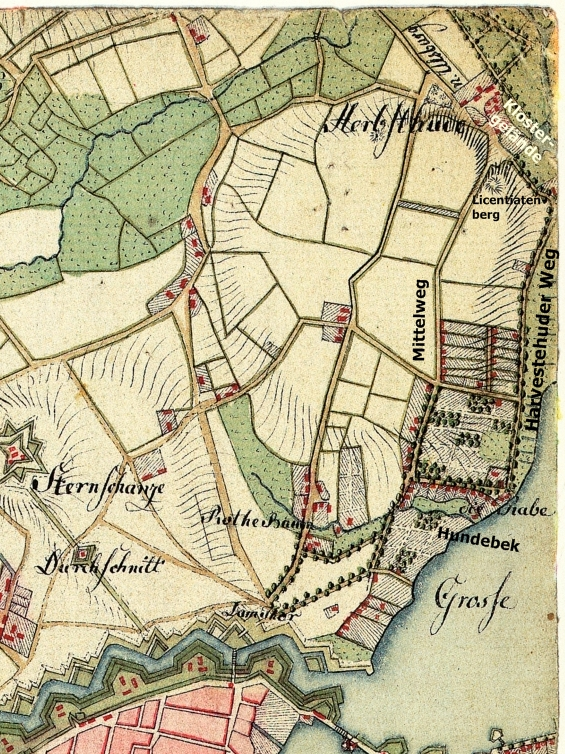
Map section around 1790

The terrain through which the Harvestehuder Weg runs is shaped by the damming of the Alster in the 13th century and the resulting Alster lake. On the western shore, it finds a natural boundary on an Ice Age moraine ridge up to 20 meters high, which was heavily forested until the 15th century. The path runs between the foot of this geest slope and the meadows lying towards the river – formerly marshy and reed-covered. In the south, the area was bounded until the end of the 19th century by the Hundebeck, a stream that sprang in the Grindelwald, at the present university campus, and flowed into the Alster at Fontenay. In the north, the path led through what was later called Frauenthal towards the Eppendorfer Baum, a ford through the Isebeck. A tumulus from the Bronze and Iron Age, located at the corner to Mittelweg and called Licentiatenberg from the 18th century, is considered a visible trace of early human life on the Harvestehuder Weg.

=== Monastery land ===
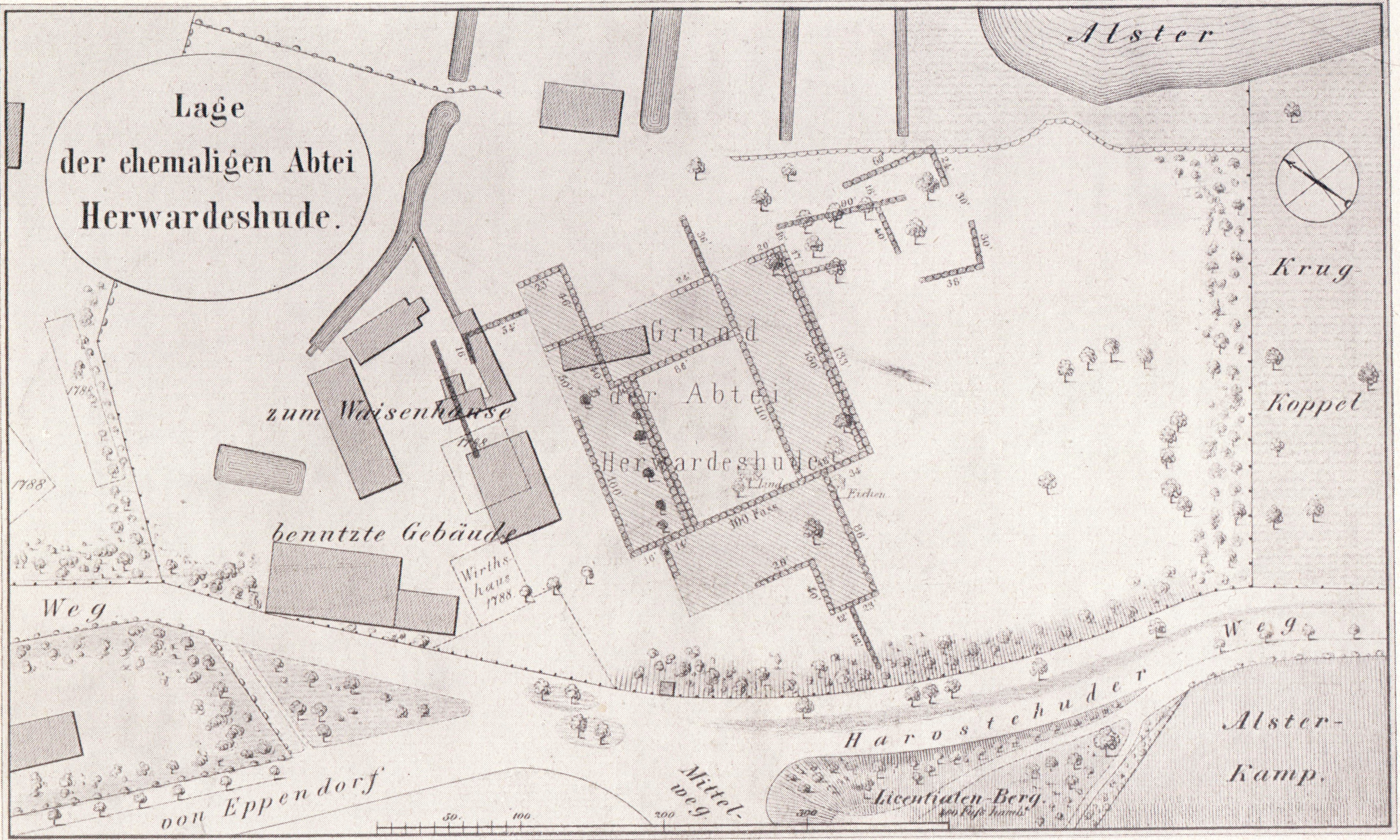
The location of the monastery, drawing by C.F. Gaedechens on a 19th-century plan

In the 13th century, the path connected the settlement Heimichhude north of the Hundebeck and the village Oderfelde south of the Isebeck. These villages as well as the associated and surrounding lands, from the Alster including the Grindel, the Schlump, and the Schäferkamp, and in the north to the Isebeck, belonged to the Schauenburg count Henry I. of Holstein-Rendsburg (ca. 1258–1304) and were purchased by him in 1293 for the Herwardeshude Abbey of the Cistercian nuns order located at the Pepermölenbeck on the Elbe, “with bushes, moors, meadows, pastures, waters and all freedoms, exempt from all taxes”. Two years later, in August 1295, the convent relocated the monastery site from the Elbe to the valley of Oderfelde, west of the present-day Eichenpark. In 1310, the monastery concluded a contract with the city of Hamburg, which took over its protection. In return, the nuns undertook to clear the lands near the city of buildings. For defense reasons, the area in front of the city fortification was to remain unbuilt, accordingly the villages Oderfelde and Heimichhude were demolished. Another contract set the Hundebeck as the boundary between monastery land and city territory.

The monastery existed for over three hundred years and managed the terrain on the Harvestehuder Weg. The Alsterkamp located on the western geest height was the core land of monastic agriculture and was used both for arable farming and for pasture for large animals, the eastern damp to marshy Alster foreshore served seasonally also as pasture land. The path itself was as Unterer Fahrweg one of three connecting roads between monastery and city.

As a result of the Reformation, the convent was dissolved in 1530, the nuns housed within the city, and the monastery buildings destroyed and demolished by decision of the council and citizenry. The legal successor and new owner of the lands was the Hamburg St. John's Monastery, the administration was taken over by a consortium established for this purpose. The area on the Harvestehuder Weg was leased in 1532 to the councilor Joachim Moller (1500–1558) and continued to be used as arable land and pasture for horses, sheep, and cattle. He built a leasehold farm with an excursion inn in place of the monastery buildings, which prompted the historian Lambecius to say: “The place is dedicated to Bacchus and turned into a tavern.”

The construction of the Hamburg city wall in the years 1616 to 1625 brought with the erection of the Lombarddamm with bridge through the Alster the separation of the river into Inner and Outer Alster and thus a clear landscape change. From the city, the area now lay in front of the Dammtor and was generally called But’n Dammdoor.

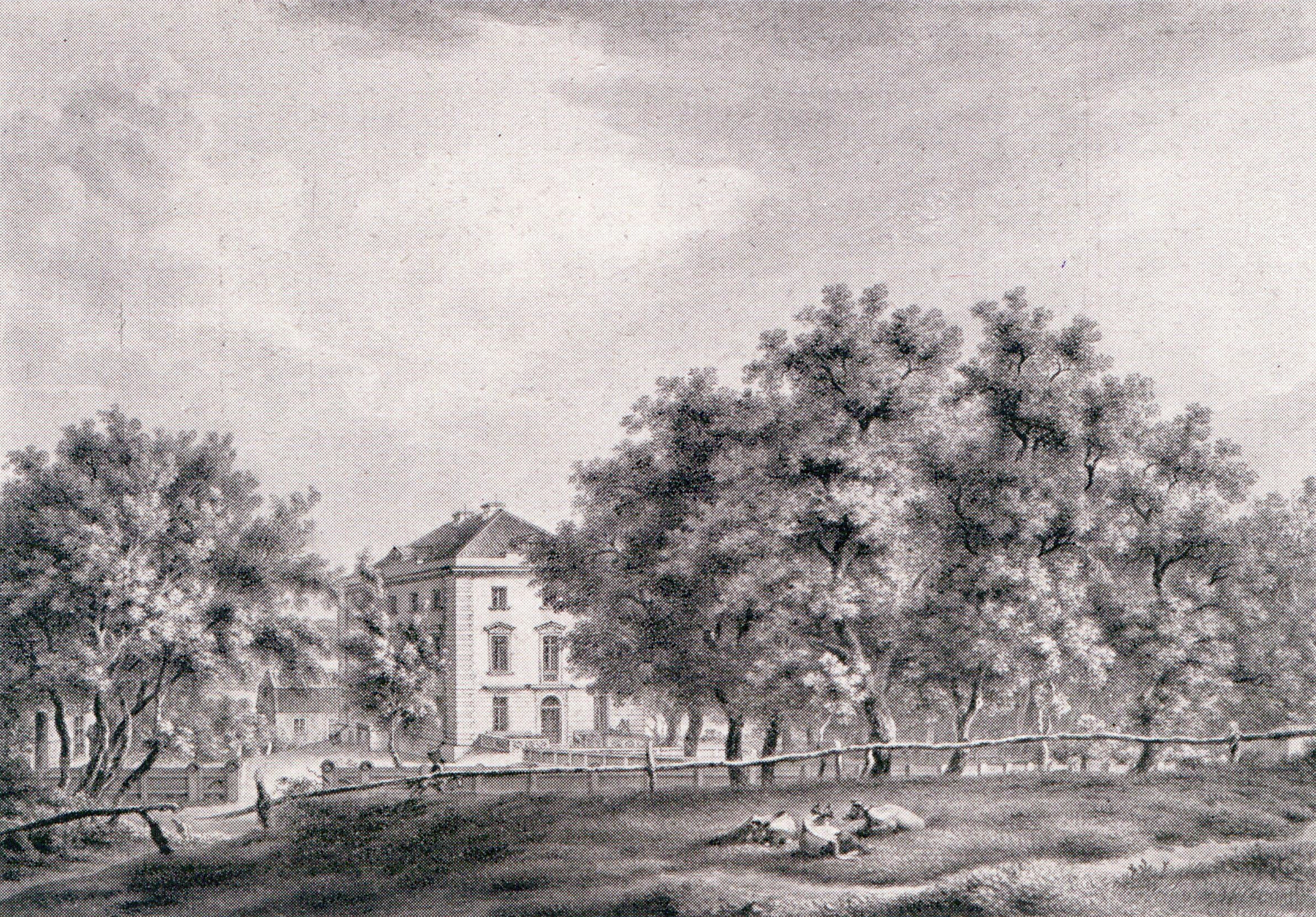
Monastery inn, around 1820

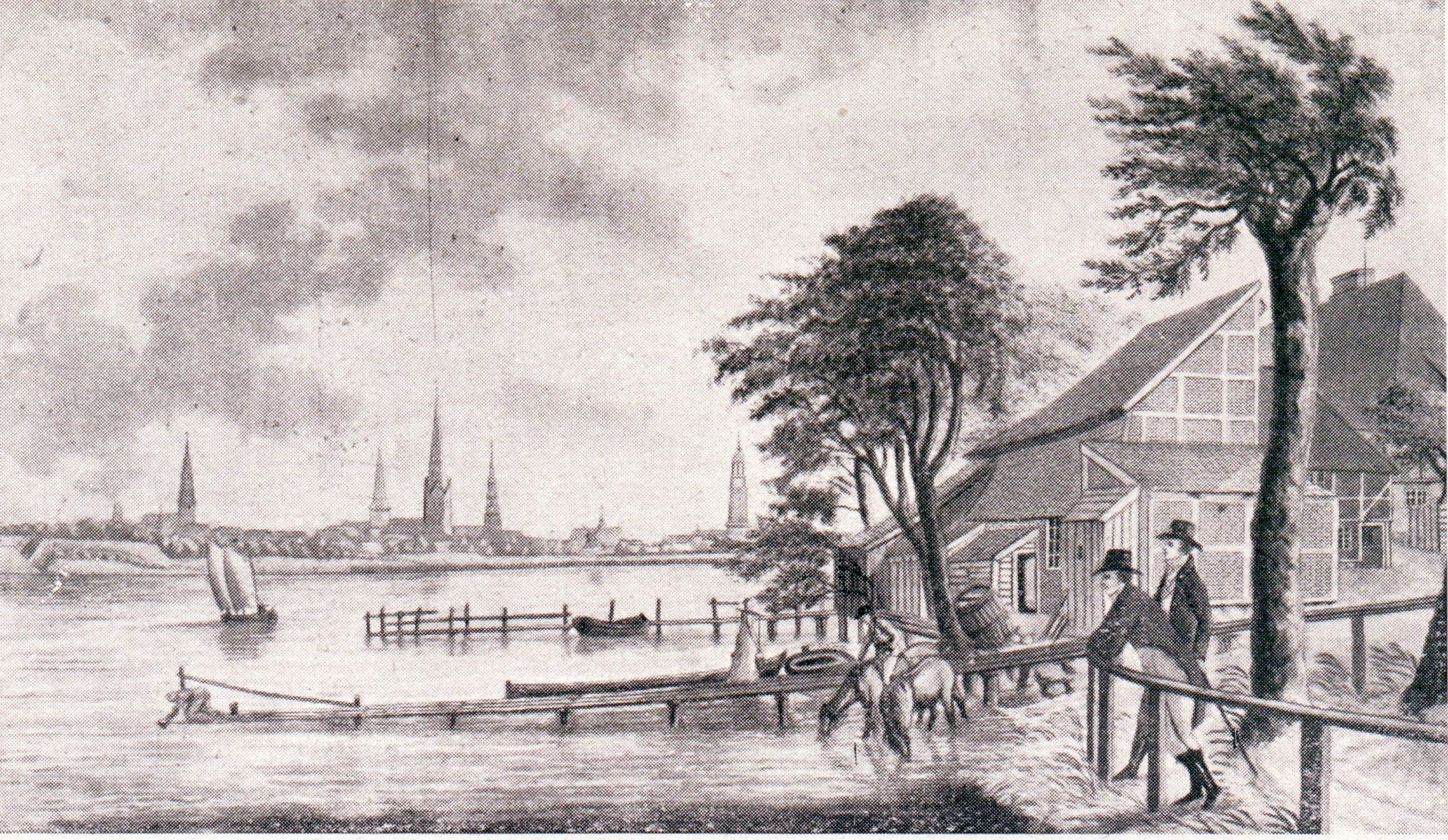
The Alte Rabe 1796

During the siege of Hamburg by the Danes under Christian V. in 1686, the buildings of the monastery farm were devastated and destroyed. The then lessee of the monastery grounds, Johann Böckmann (the Elder), had the inn rebuilt in 1688. At the same time, a “pleasure house for the monastery maidens” was built on the part of the grounds located on the Alster, which served as an excursion destination for the now urban monastery members. But the area also became a popular local recreation area for other city dwellers; in the 18th century, nature walks and country parties gained increasing importance. From 1703 to 1716, Bartoldo Huswedel, licentiate of law and president of the Hamburg lower court, leased the monastery inn expressly because of the value of its charming surroundings. The inn and its linden-tree beer garden became known both for its idyllic location and for the dispensing of “refreshing and spirited drinks”. The way from the city there could be taken on the Unterer Fahrweg as a walk or over the Mittlerer Fahrweg with a horse carriage. The trip over the river with the Alster boats called Arche, which were covered with a roof of sailcloth and rowed, was also considered charming. Another excursion inn was opened in the 18th century at the city-nearer beginning of the Harvestehuder Weg, where a ferry point was also laid out. It bore the name De Rave, from which later Die Alte Rabe became.

=== Garden land ===
Johann Böckmann (the Elder), lessee of the lands and owner of the monastery inn, laid out a nursery and tree nursery between 1680 and 1690 on the southern part of the Alsterkamp, between the later Alte Rabenstraße and Milchstraße. This was in the possession of the family until 1856. Opposite, towards the Mittelweg, the Steindorfsche Kattunfabrik arose in the 18th century, which used the meadows at the Hundebeck up to the Alster as bleaching fields. Another nursery was laid out from 1717 by Johann Nicolaus Roose and Matthias Stamp in the terrain from Milchstraße to the present Alsterchaussee. The heirs, Otto Friedrich Rönn and Bernhard Jochim Stamp, divided the land leased from the monastery consortium and passed it on to sub-lessees. Small gardens with gardeners' dwelling huts as well as garden houses for the summer stay of city citizens arose there. According to tradition, it was said of these lessees that they “pöselten gemütlich vor sich hin”, which meant “they work without great success”. The name Pöseldorf derived from this for the spot behind the Harvestehuder Weg was transferred in the 19th century to the growing quarter, but never designated an independent quarter with fixed boundaries.

The monastery consortium disapproved of the proceedings in several letters and protocols and in 1776 transferred the land to sixteen plot users as property. Around 1800, the first classicist country houses arose there, which served for summer stay in the undeveloped area, thus 1795 for Senator Nicolaus Bernhard Eybe, 1799 for the Prussian privy councilor Martin Jacob von Faber, and 1802 for the Amsinck family. Building permission was granted on the condition that the buildings be removable again in case of war. The settlement of the Alster shore, the gem of Hamburg's local recreation, was observed with benevolent criticism:

Either chance or a correct sense of local propriety enabled the old Hamburgers not to burden them with high pompous houses and Versailles gardens. […] But the new Italian roofs and Roman villas have not been able to erase the stamp of nature around them. The feelings of the observer remain here of the mild kind that the plain and the sight of a not narrow but quiet river can provide. Here nothing rustles; the area only claims the heart.

— Jonas Ludwig von Heß, Hamburg, topographically, politically and historically described, 1810

During the French occupation period, the commandant, Marshal Louis-Nicolas Davout, had all settlements and buildings in the vicinity of the city fortification burned down in 1813. This affected the entire development on the Unterer Fahrweg including the inns, the area had “become desert again”. After the departure of the French, reconstruction proceeded relatively quickly, Die Alte Rabe was re-established and the monastery inn, far larger than before, was newly built in the style of a classicist country house. Böckmann's garden could also soon be continued. Johann Heinrich Böckmann (1767–1854), descendant of the first Johann Böckmann, had already bought the lands from the monastery consortium in 1788 and now divided some plots towards the Harvestehuder Weg for development.

From 1818, the financially distressed foundation of the St. John's Monastery sold further building plots on the Alsterkamp. The best-known landowner in the northern part became the construction entrepreneur Christian Diederich Gerhard Schwieger. He laid out the Schwiegerallee in his terrain, later called Alsterchaussee, and built a country house there in 1828. Since the city of Hamburg, which recorded large population growth, the areas near the city were extremely important, the Senate decided in 1826 to take over the sovereign rights, in 1830 the monastery lands were incorporated into the newly founded Landherrenschaft der Geestlande, named Vogtei Rotherbaum and Vogtei Harvestehude and declared as city extension area. They were parceled and developed with new streets. Only the leasehold farm remained in the possession of the monastery foundation. Urban use of the terrain, however, only took place after the Great Fire of 1842. The monastery inn, which had not found a new lessee for some years, was provisionally set up as an orphanage for the children who had become homeless. The institution existed there until 1858, then it moved to a new house on Uhlenhorst. Subsequently, the former inn served for two years as a dragoon garrison before it was finally abandoned and demolished in 1860.

=== Country houses and city villas ===
The Oberalten responsible for Harvestehude, significant community representatives at that time, tried to prevent the sale of plots on the Harvestehuder Weg to private investors. In a pro-memoria letter of March 19, 1838 to the Senate, it says that “thereby the only pretty landscape which we still possess in such proximity to the city would be stunted and destroyed”. They ultimately could not prevent the development, but the sale of the area at Licentiatenberg was stopped for the time being. All further plots were sold “cum conditonibus”, i.e. under high conditions. Thus the new owners had to be citizens of the city of Hamburg or the surrounding rural communities, were not allowed to operate “any kind of business” on the plot and were not allowed to fell or prune oaks and beeches without permission. The rural character was to be preserved, the Alster foreshore was not to be built on. In terms of building law, it was prescribed to erect single-family houses with front and rear gardens, the construction of “small dwellings, dwelling halls and booths” was prohibited, as was the settlement of shops “which annoy the neighbors by bad smell or excessive noise”. Jews were also initially excluded from acquiring the plots, but this condition was lifted again in 1842. The remaining provisions flowed in meaning into later guidelines and are still valid today in the Outer Alster Ordinance of 1953.

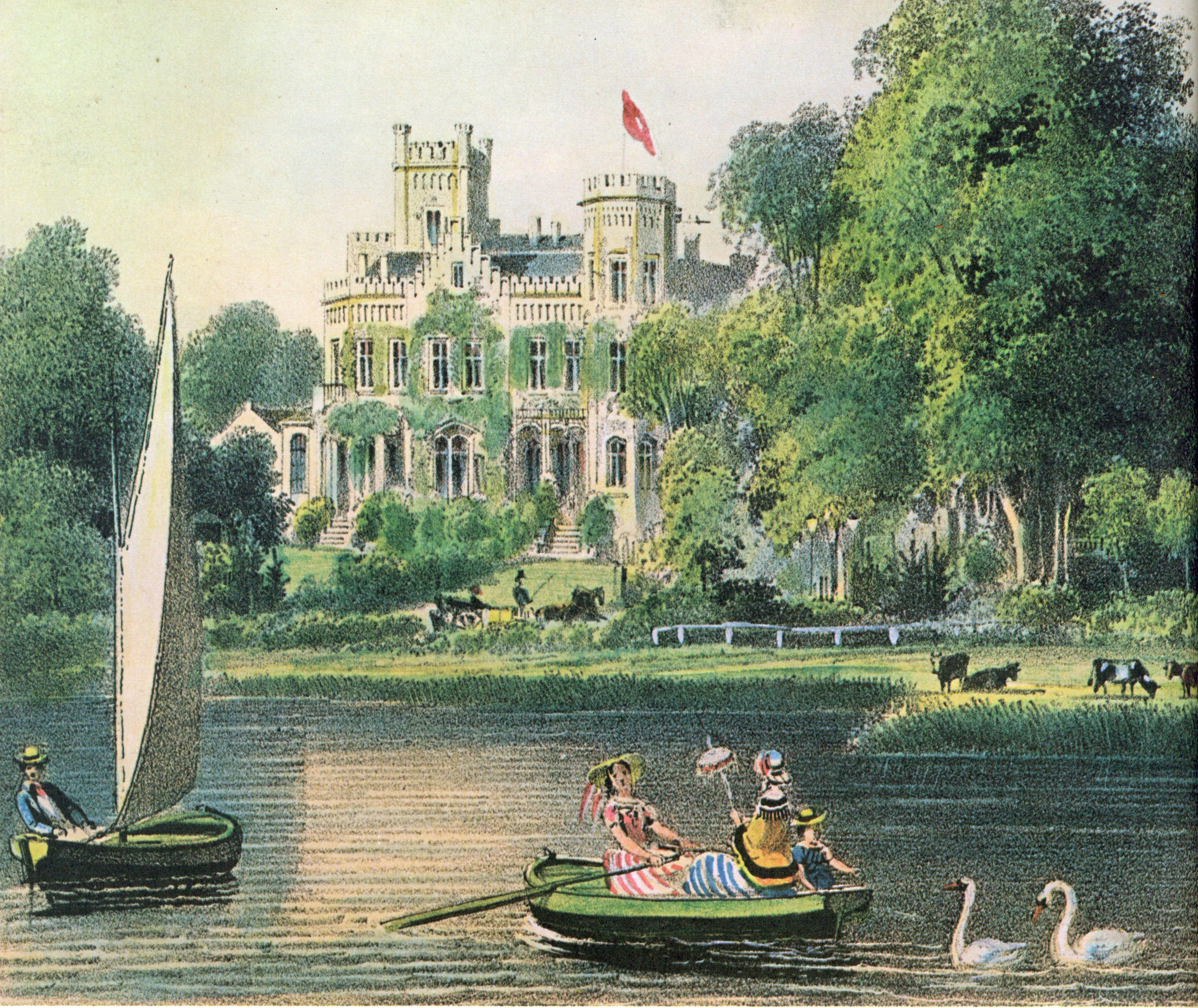
Sloman-Burg, around 1850

In addition to the construction of individual country houses, such as those of the Amsinck and Sthamer families, the development of the area progressed only slowly. Public attention was received in 1848 by the construction of the later so-called Slomanburg as the first residential building on the Harvestehuder Weg that could be inhabited year-round. In fact, it was only the abolition of the gate closure in 1861 that led to increased development of the street. It received its first water supply in 1853, in 1873 it was connected to the Geest main sewer. The exit roads from Dammtor, such as Grindelallee and Roter Baum, were “chausseed”, i.e. paved with stones, the Mittelweg was paved up to the height of Alsterchaussee and then passed into a sand path. But the Harvestehuder Weg remained an “unfathomable” sand path and “completely unlit”. Administratively, the two vogteien Rotherbaum and Harvestehude were declared suburbs in 1874 and quarters of Hamburg in 1894.

After the death of Johann Heinrich Böckmann in 1854, the heirs finally gave up the nursery and made the terrain available for further building planning. With the layout of Magdalenenstraße, named after Böckmann's wife Catharina Magdalena (1777–1864), and Böttgerstraße, named after Böckmann's head gardener Elias Heinrich Böttger (1766–1847), a hinterland connection to the Harvestehuder Weg was created. In the small-scale development of Pöseldorf, mainly craftsmen and “petty bourgeois trade” settled. The streets were, corresponding to this development, laid out narrow and angular by the local owners. They were also used as rear access to the large villa properties and, as their components, also built with horse stables, coachmen's dwellings, carriage sheds, and smithies.

In the course of the development of Rothenbaum, from the middle of the 19th century the Hundebeck was gradually filled in, in 1908 also the mouth area was built over. This made it possible to establish a connection between the street Alsterufer and the Harvestehuder Weg and to create a continuous connecting road along the Alster. The planning, taken up again in the early 1950s, of a public road completely encircling the Alster lake was already debated in this context in 1906 in the citizenry and substantiated with a vivid comparison:

We all agree that, apart from the hideous climate we have, Hamburg is one of the most beautiful cities in the world. (Bravo!) Hamburg owes this beauty almost exclusively to the Alster. If we have such a gem as the Alster, then we should also design the setting of this gem in such a way that its beauty is highlighted as much as possible.

— Johann Berenberg Gossler, Speech before the citizenry on March 21, 1906 on the occasion of the application for the construction of a continuous road

When the first development plan for the now quarter city extension area was developed between 1899 and 1906, most plots were already built on. The plan mainly had the function “to take into account as far as possible the preservation of the existing development.” In its basic features, this milieu protection is still in the current land use plans and preservation programs.

=== Street of millionaires ===
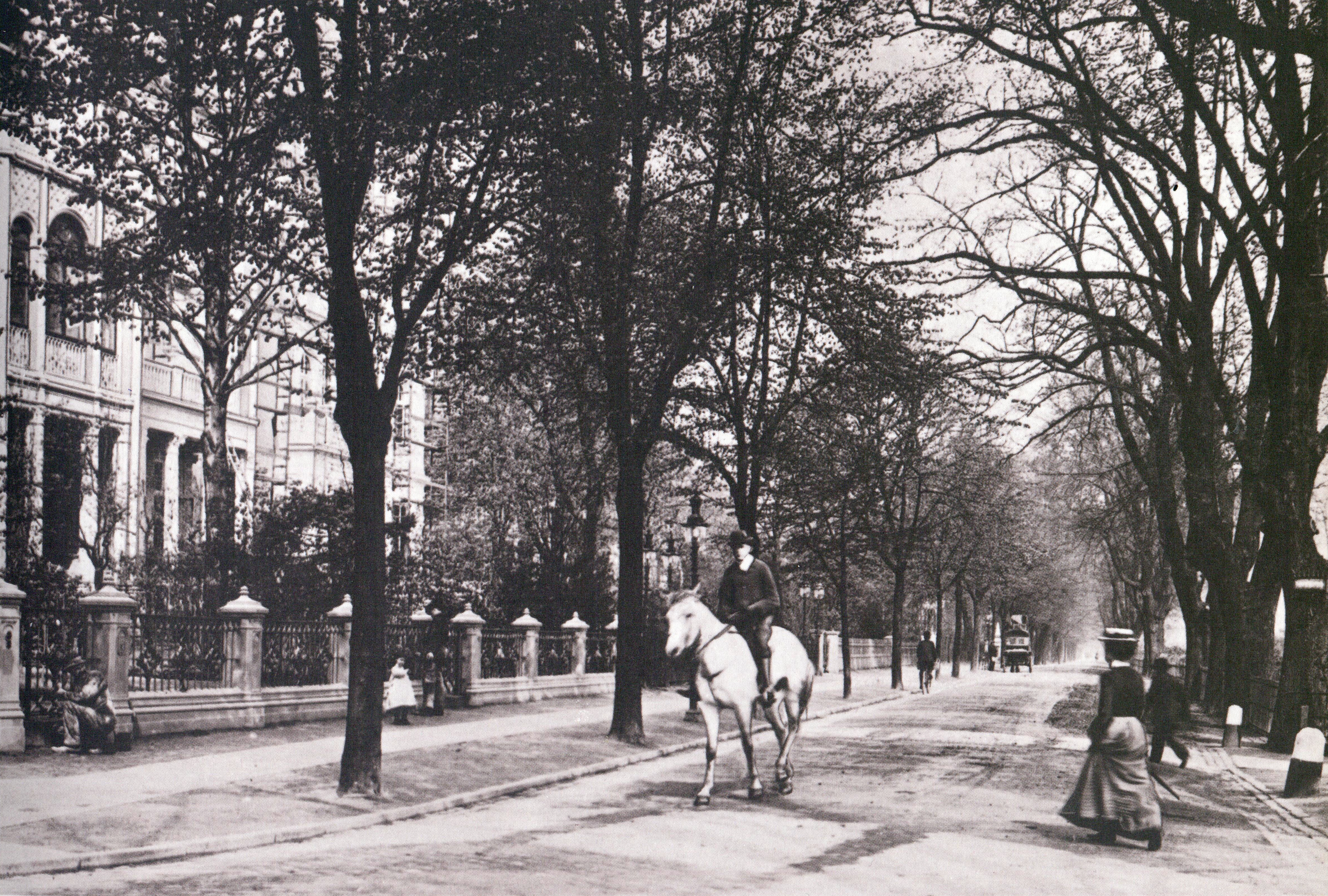
Harvestehuder Weg from the direction of Alte Rabenstraße, 1904

The “almost only consisting of palaces suburban annex” on the Harvestehuder Weg arose mainly in the last third of the 19th century. With the economic rise and the growing population of Hamburg, the restructuring of the city also went hand in hand. The construction of the Speicherstadt not only had changed city spaces as a consequence, it also had influence on the housing and lifestyle of the merchants. Warehouse, office, and dwelling, previously under one roof, were now separated, for the merchants the plots on the Harvestehuder Weg offered high attractiveness, in contrast to the also magnificently built Elbchaussee in the then Prussian Altona, one was in the city extension area and close to the inner city. Around 1900, almost all plots were built on, the twenty-five garden houses that stood there in the middle of the 19th century were demolished for new buildings or built over by them. In 1910, there were fifty detached villas between Alte Rabenstraße and Licentiatenberg, another six at Eichenpark, and about thirty row villas between Mittelweg and Klosterstern.

Through the building regulations, especially the requirement to erect single houses in garden plots, the social structure of the quarter was predetermined. In 1911, 723 millionaires lived in Hamburg, over half of them in the quarters Harvestehude and Rotherbaum, of these about 12.5% on the Harvestehuder Weg. From the Yearbook of the Wealth and Income of Millionaires compiled by Rudolf Martin in 1912, it can be seen that between Alte Rabenstraße and Licentiatenberg almost every villa was inhabited by a millionaire family. The owners came for the most part from well-known Hamburg merchant families and were known as senators or holders of public offices. In addition to the Slomans and Lutteroths, members of the families Amsinck, Behrens, Blohm, Hudtwalcker, Krogmann, Laeisz, and Robinow lived there after the turn of the century. The “regional Hamburg old nobility lived entirely among themselves” wrote the writer and politician Ascan Klée Gobert.

However, ownership of the properties was subject to frequent change; they provide a picture of the economic, political, and social conditions in the 20th century. Until the First World War, the constantly growing wealth of Hamburg merchants found its visible expression in the development on the Alster. The economic problems of the postwar period up to the Great Depression and their effects in 1930 led to the material decline of some wealthy Hamburg merchants and bankers; numerous insolvencies were accompanied by the sales of the villas and plots. There was a partial conversion of the large buildings; they were converted into multi-family houses, for office and bureau use or for representation purposes. Within the grown city, the Harvestehuder Weg had moved closer to the inner city and thus had also become a representative address for companies and consulates.

=== Government seat ===
From 1933, the new National Socialist rulers were interested in the area on the western Alster and especially in the Harvestehuder Weg. There were numerous expropriations and forced sales of plots, especially of Jewish or Jewish-descended owners, which were then taken over by state and National Socialist institutions. The desired centering of the Hamburg administration as well as the political and economic power areas in the Reichsgau Hamburg under the leadership of the Gauleiter and Reichsstatthalter Karl Kaufmann found a correspondence in the concentration of their residential and official seats on the Harvestehuder Weg. Thus Kaufmann set up the Gauleitung in the large villa Am Alsterufer 27., the present US American consulate. For his second function, he occupied the former Budge-Palais as well as two adjacent villas on the Harvestehuder Weg with the Reichsstatthalterei; the disenfranchisement of the Jewish owners made this possible. The Reichsgaupropagandaamt, the SS group leadership, the SA upper group, offices of the Wehrmacht, the Kriegsmarine, and a Luftwaffe staff were also housed in the villas of this street, as well as functionaries from politics and business took up their residence there.

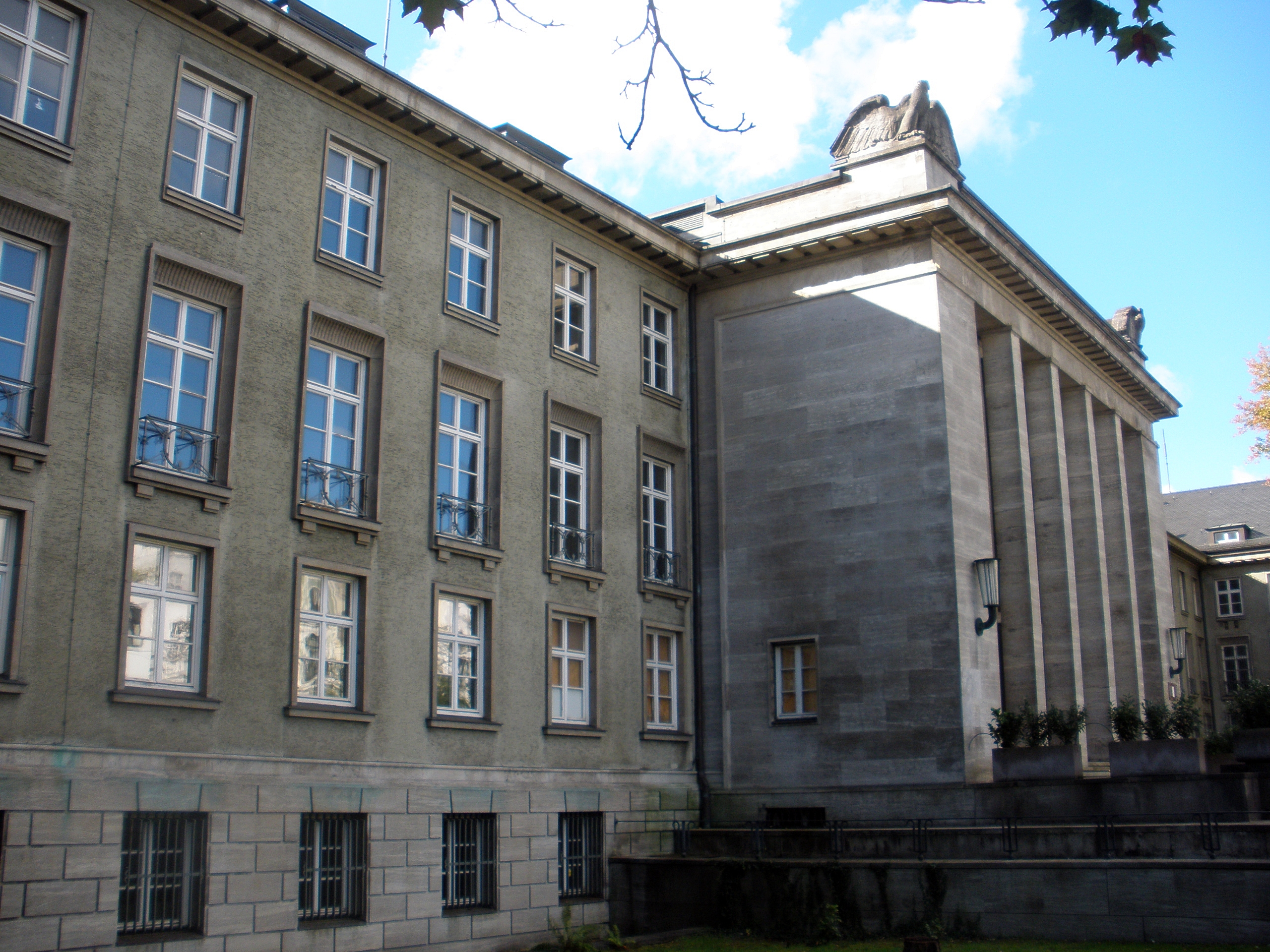
Location commandant's office at Sophienterrasse

The most incisive urban change was created between 1935 and 1937 with the erection of the monumental location commandant's office for the general command of Wehrkreis X at Sophienterrasse. In the Second World War, especially during the air raids in Operation Gomorrah on the night of July 29 to 30, 1943, there were some destructions on the Harvestehuder Weg, but overall relatively minor war damage was recorded for this part of the city. Destruction or damage mainly affected the properties around the commandant's office. When in April 1945 the city of Hamburg was declared a fortress in view of the approaching Allied troops, Karl Kaufmann had the area on the Harvestehuder Weg secured with high barbed wire fence and by military posts. Access was only possible via Milchstraße with a special pass. In addition to military reasons, Kaufmann saw this as a personal necessity, as he feared being deposed by Heinrich Himmler and Karl Dönitz.

After the end of the war, the British occupation forces requisitioned the buildings previously occupied by authorities and National Socialist institutions, as well as some private houses, including the villas of Mayor Carl Vincent Krogmann and shipyard owner Rudolf Blohm, who had been involved in the U-boat construction of the Kriegsmarine. Troops members and military facilities were housed in the houses, partly they were also made available to new users. Beyond the occupation period, the British Consulate General existed from 1956 to 2006 in No. 8a; the Anglo-German Club is still located in No. 44.

=== New development ===
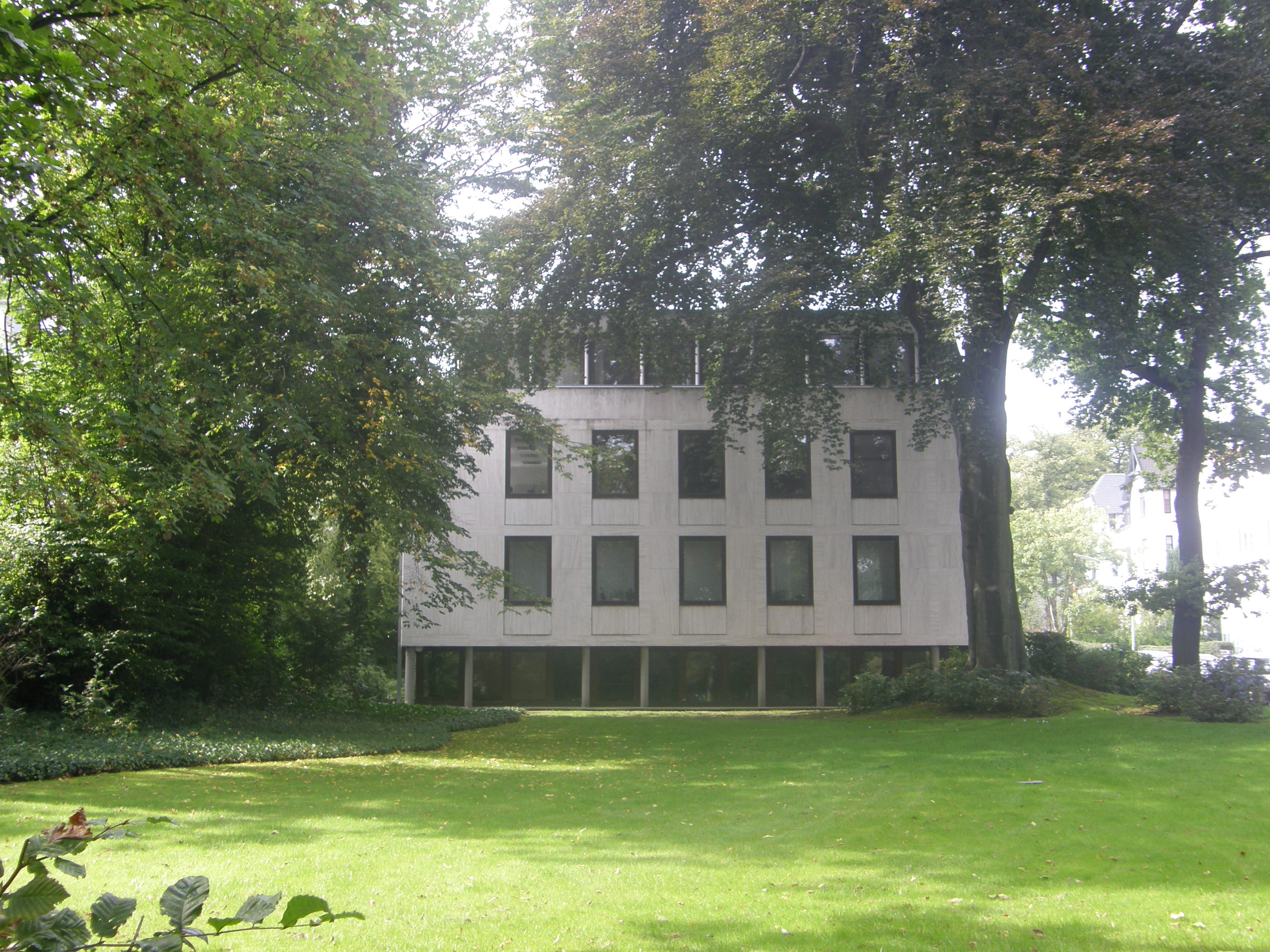
Harvestehuder Weg 21: Office building from 1967 at the corner of Alsterchaussee

A significant change in use on the Harvestehuder Weg was the layout of the Alsterpark on the occasion of the International Garden Show 1953. The necessary expropriation of private gardens of the residents on the Alster foreshore goes back to an initiative of Mayor Max Brauer and was called a “milestone for the cultural and social awakening mood of the Hanseatic city of Hamburg in the first postwar decade”. Another change in the social structure was the conversion of the former Reichsstatthalterei into the music academy. At the same time, with the new development of war-destroyed plots and the conversion of the large villas that no longer corresponded to contemporary housing ideas, new buildings and complexes arose in the sober architecture of the 1960s. The favorable inner-city location and the still prestigious address led to an influx of administration companies, consulates, insurance companies, corporate headquarters, and law firms. The restructuring met with harsh criticism:

“This street, admired throughout the world with its oaks, its gardens, its generous sense of space, it should have remained a representative street of country houses.”

Since the 1990s, a renewed upheaval has been taking place on the Harvestehuder Weg both in dealing with the existing stock and in the type and manner of development. On the one hand, several villas and apartment complexes were bought by investors, expensively renovated for representation or resold or also demolished. In addition, new construction projects were added that serve the upper segment of the housing market. After the Bundeswehr left its former location commandant's office at Sophienterrasse 14 in 2005, this approximately 44,000 square meter property area, which extends to the Harvestehuder Weg, was developed for a new residential quarter. With 40,000 square meters of gross floor area, townhouses in luxury finish were built. Further exclusive apartments were laid out on the neighboring property Harvestehuder Weg 36. The generous terrain of the office building of the Gerling Group demolished at the beginning of 2010 at No. 25, corner Klosterstieg, was also developed in this style.

The art historian Hermann Hipp had already described the backgrounds and the danger of this development in 1976:

This quarter, so attractive in its overall appearance, equipped with green furnishings and street development, with its extremely rich architecture become the most valuable inner-city residential quarter, has become more and more a starting point for the building market. Through new construction, one seeks to increase the coveted apartments, but thereby destroys the buildings that give the quarter its character.

— Hermann Hipp, Idyll and building market

== Along the street ==
Already Fritz Schumacher (1869–1947), in whose time as Hamburg building director (1909–1933) the first design of the Harvestehuder Weg was largely completed, called the architecture on the path a “motley mishmash”, for the building styles of the last one hundred and fifty years were imitated and mixed into an adventurous style salad. Although the engineer William Lindley (1808–1900) had designed a uniform overall concept for the city extension area Rotherbaum/Harvestehude around 1850, this idea did not prevail especially on the Harvestehuder Weg. The current stock shows a variety of building types, the style mix has continued after Schumacher's time.

=== Architecture ===
The oldest preserved architectural monument on the Harvestehuder Weg is the so-called Slomanburg, built on plot No. 5 and 6 by the architect Jean David Jollasse (1810–1876) in the years 1848/1849. It is regarded as the most remarkable building of romantic historicism in Hamburg, enriched with details such as turrets, battlements, and tracery from English Tudor Gothic and characterized by the extensive garden layout. In the historical context, it is the clear sign of the replacement of the rural modest garden house by the elaborate country seat.

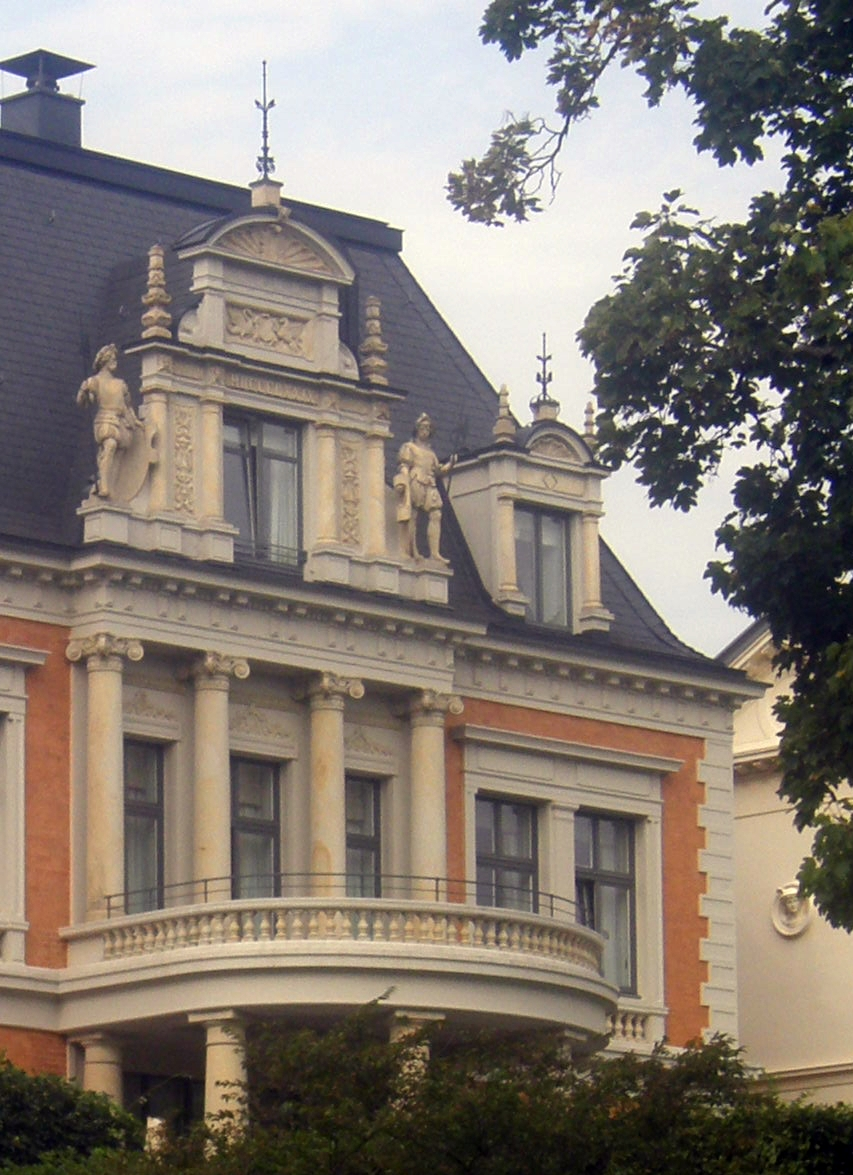
Example of a villa in Neo-Renaissance style from 1879, Harvestehuder Weg 7a

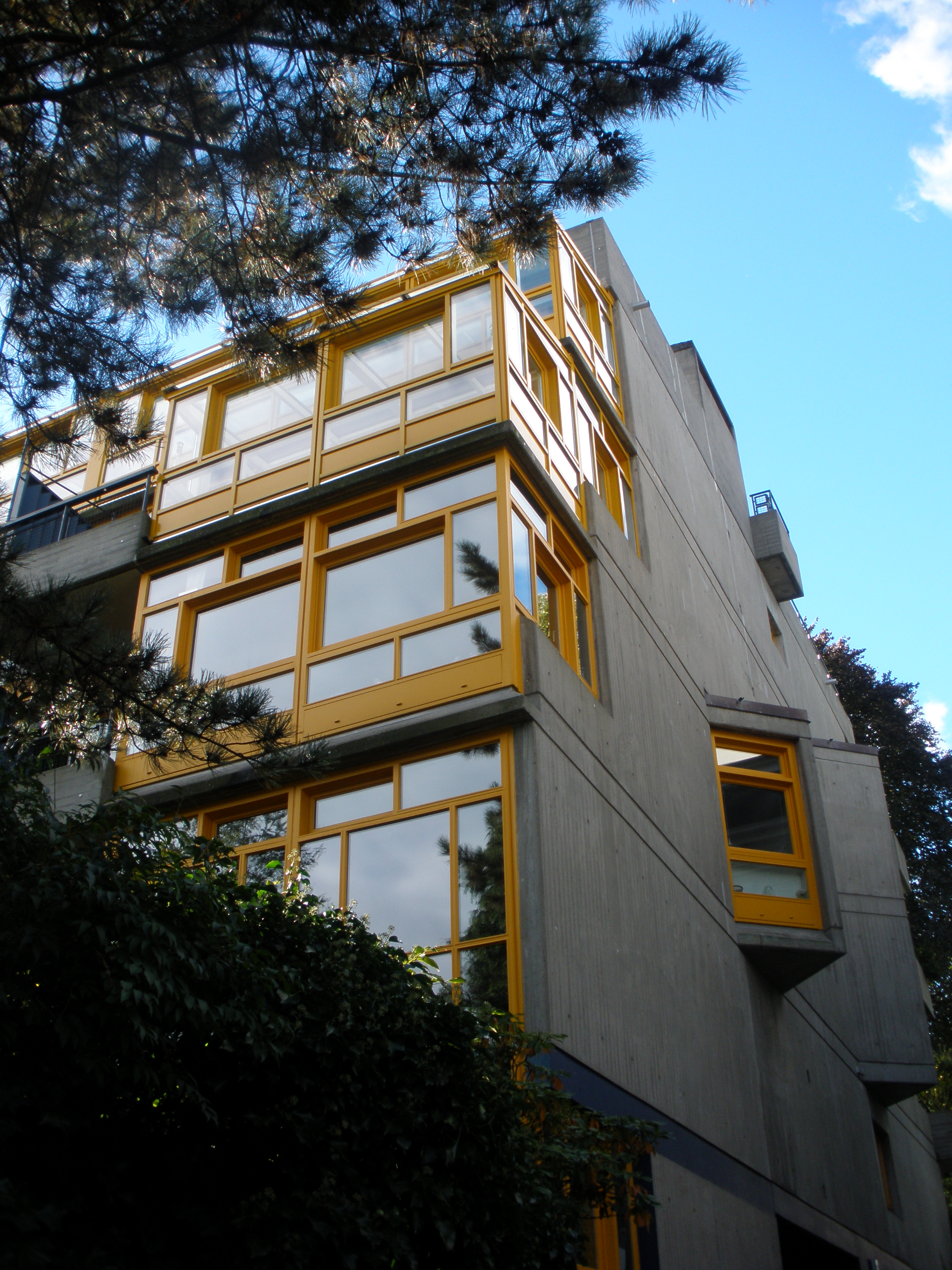
“Gruff intruder” from 1974, Harvestehuder Weg 55

The core of the Gründerzeit single villas is the group to the right and left of the junction of Milchstraße, consisting of the Budge-Palais (house number 12), the Villa Beit (house number 13), and the Villa Behrens (house number 14/15). All three buildings were built by the architect Martin Haller (1835–1925) between 1884 and 1899 in the formal language of Neo-Renaissance, later conversions and extensions up to 1910 were also carried out by him. The overall ensemble of the white plastered buildings also includes the former stable and farm buildings on the rear. Two further preserved villas come from Haller, the Heine-Villa, house number 41, and the Anglo-German Club with house number 44. The sixth Haller villa on the Harvestehuder Weg, built in 1885 for the Amsinck family at house number 20, was destroyed in a bomb attack in 1943.

As an exemplary group of the Gründerzeit, the three villas with numbers 7a to 8a are also designated. There, a development of the building types can be observed side by side, while the Villa Horschitz with house number 8, built in 1872 by the architect Albert Rosengarten (1809–1893), with belvedere, portico, and triangular gable still takes up the classicist tradition, number 7a, built in 1879 in the style of Neo-Renaissance, architect unknown, stands out especially with facing brick wall surfaces. In the Villa Laeisz with house number 8a, planned in 1906 by Ernst Paul Dorn, on the other hand, first elements of the Art Nouveau rare in Hamburg become visible, permeated by neo-baroque forms.

References to reform architecture can be found in the house Harvestehuder Weg 50 at the end of the Alsterpark. It dates from 1928, was built for Ricardo Sloman, and was the first brick building on this street. It corresponds with the nearby Krugkoppelbrücke designed by Fritz Schumacher in 1927/1928, whose three markedly curved basket arches are executed in clinker masonry. New Building with clear references to the Bauhaus is applied in the house with number 45 on the grounds of Hoffmann and Campe. It was built in 1930/1931 by the architect Emil Fahrenkamp (1885–1966). As one of the few buildings of NS architecture in Hamburg, the general command of the Wehrmacht built in 1936 by Hermann Distel (1875–1945) and August Grubitz (1876–1946) at Sophienterrasse is regarded. It is seen as a curiosity that, contrary to the megalomaniac high-rise buildings planned on the Elbe shore, this neoclassicist monumental complex, hidden behind the Harvestehuder Weg, can hardly develop its effect.

An incunabulum of reconstruction architecture is the elongated office building of the architect Ferdinand Streb (1907–1970) at the beginning of the street, which was built in 1953/1954 in the overall ensemble with further buildings on Alte Rabenstraße. As a gruff intruder that nevertheless fits well into the Gründerzeit stucco villas, the multi-story house at house number 55 is designated in the Hamburg architecture guide. It was planned and executed between 1972 and 1974 by Helmut Wolff and Dieter Schlühr. Striking are, in addition to two gable walls and a central wall, its orange-framed veranda-like projections. As another well-integrated new building, the publishing house Hoffmann und Campe built between 1989 and 1991 at Harvestehuder Weg 42 is regarded, which was designed by Jochem Jourdan and Bernhard Müller in the style of postmodernism with eclectic character – with borrowings from classicism and the Vienna Secession.

=== Monument protection ===
26 objects are under monument protection on the Harvestehuder Weg, of which 20 buildings and 18 residential or office houses: nine villas and a remise from the 19th century, seven villas from the beginning of the 20th century, a multi-family house with its garages and outdoor facilities from the 1970s. Further protected buildings are the Wehrmacht general command from 1936 at Sophienterrasse and the St. Nicolai church from 1960/1962. Recognizable in the street course is the social topographical gradient: detached representative single buildings with opulent facade decoration amidst generous garden plots, on the so-called “wet part” with Alster view, and leading away from the Alster, in the “dry part”, smaller double or row villas with plastered fronts. Accordingly, only three of the eighteen monument-protected residential houses are located in this part of the street.

In addition to the buildings, six further objects in the Harvestehuder Weg and its immediate surroundings are entered in the list of recognized monuments of the city of Hamburg. These include the Alster foreshore with the Alsterpark created in 1953 according to the design of Gustav Lüttge, the boat landing Alte Rabenstraße especially because of its Art Nouveau elements, an air-raid shelter built in 1943 on the property Harvestehuder Weg 10/12, a monument to the poet Friedrich Hagedorn in the Eichenpark, a memorial plaque for Heinrich Heine on the property Harvestehuder Weg 41, as well as the Krugkoppelbrücke created by Fritz Schumacher.

=== Eastern street side ===
The eastern street side facing the Outer Alster has been largely owned by the city of Hamburg since the early 1950s and designed with generous park layouts and boat landings as public space. The development at the end of the Eichenpark towards Frauenthal street also took place on city land, the houses there numbers 78 to 84 belong to the stock of the municipal housing company SAGA.

==== Alte Rabe ====
The Harvestehuder Weg begins at the ferry pier Alte Rabenstraße, which serves as a stop for Alster shipping, a boat dock, and a boat rental facility. In the summer months, a catering business is set up there. This location existed as early as the 18th century as an excursion inn called De Rave. In the later adaptation to Standard German, a confusion of articles turned it into Die Rabe. After another inn opened around 1800 in front of the Dammtor as Die Neue Rabe, the name was expanded to Die Alte Rabe. It is recorded that it was a much-visited gastronomy venue with good cuisine, also easily accessible due to the landing stage for Alsterarchen (boats covered with a canvas roof). With the start of Alster shipping in 1859, the pier became the deployment site for the ferry to St. Georg. The current landing bridge dates from 1909; it, including the pontoon, the wrought-iron balustrades, and the Art Nouveau lamps, is listed as a protected ensemble.

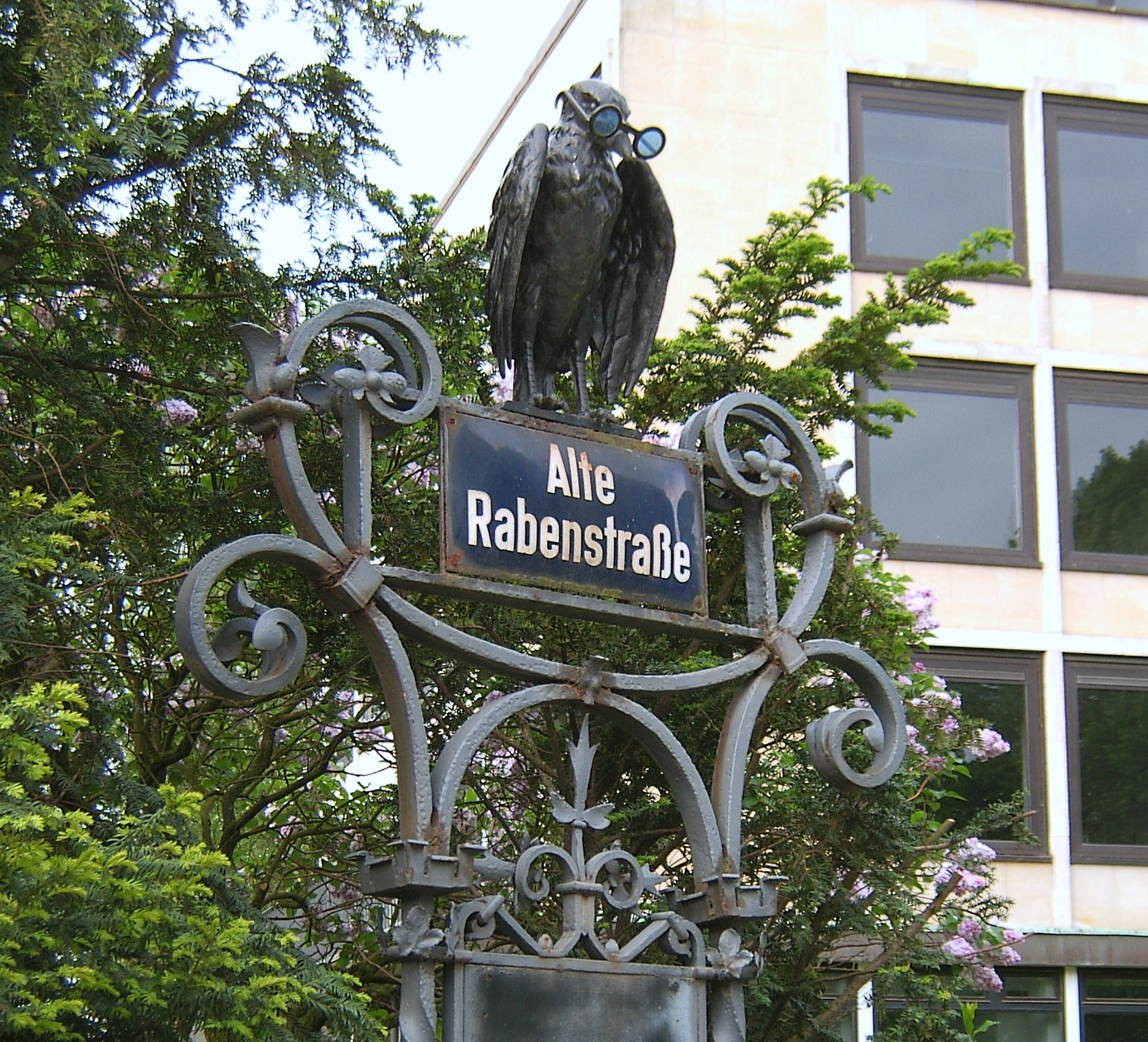
Street sign with the Alte Rabe

The street sign at the corner of Alte Rabenstraße/Harvestehuder Weg was created by chief construction engineer Franz Andreas Meyer (1837–1901) as a wrought-iron construction with the figure of a raven in memory of the inn. About this figure, the art historian Erwin Panofsky (1892–1968) passed down the anecdote that the raven lost its spectacles during the November Revolution of 1918. Therefore, "a younger acquaintance inclined to jokes" wrote a touching letter to the building deputation, pretending to be an 80-year-old resident of Alte Rabenstraße, requesting the restoration of the original state; she, the old lady, could not rest in her grave until the old raven had its spectacles again. A few weeks later, the spectacles were reattached.

=== Alstervorland ===
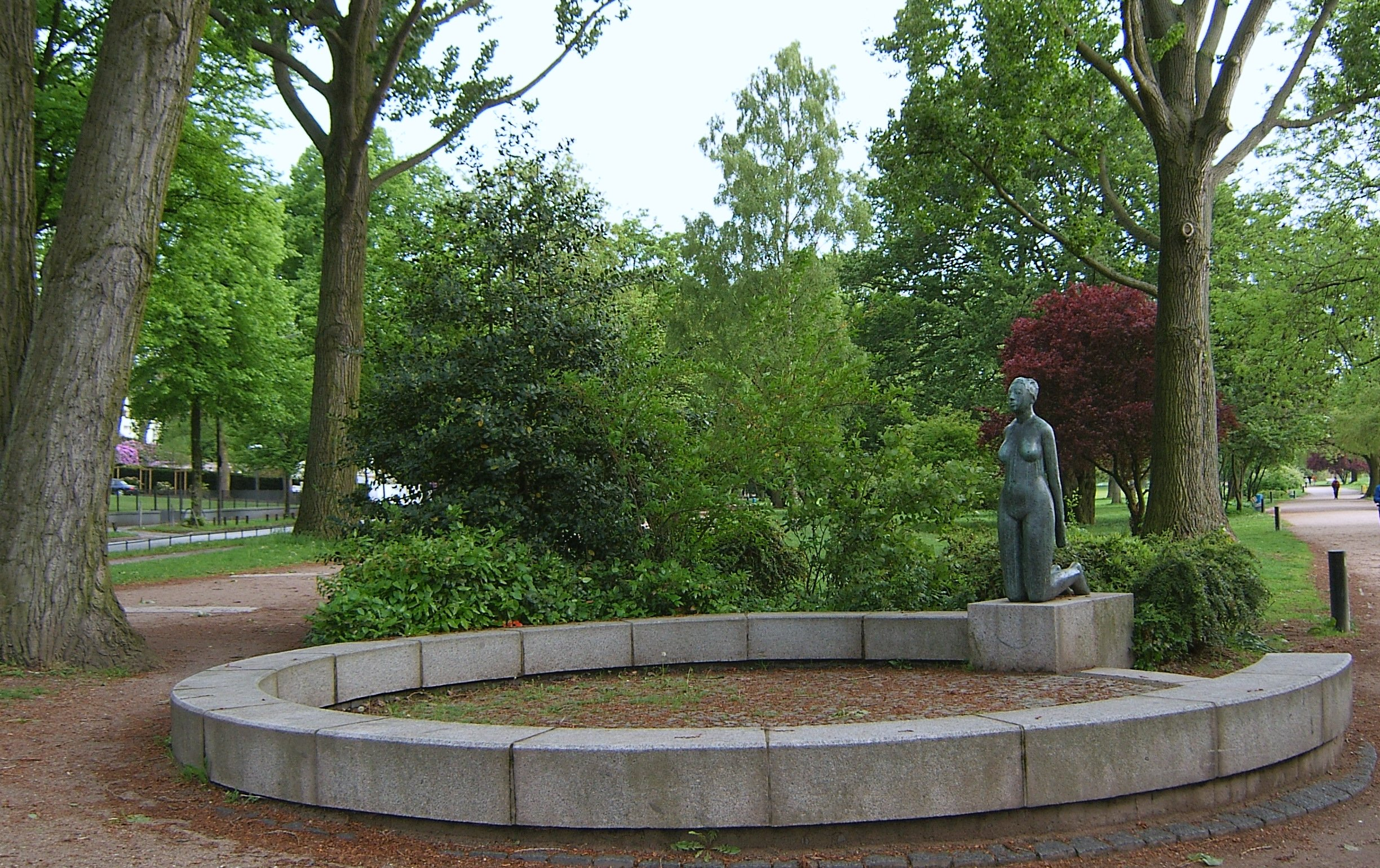
Alsterpark with the sculpture Kniende by Gustav Seitz

The Alstervorland originated with the damming of the Alster in the 13th century as a marshy and frequently flooded meadow. It served seasonally as pasture until the 19th century. From 1850, with the construction of new locks, the Alster's water level was lowered by one meter; the meadows were largely drained. With the development of the plots on Harvestehuder Weg, the owners laid out their gardens in the Alstervorland. Construction was excluded under the 19th-century building regulations, which flowed into the Außenalster Ordinance in 1953. As early as the late 19th century, chief construction engineer Franz Andreas Meyer (1837–1901) planned a ring road around the Alster to enable public access to the shores; in the 1902 development plan, the Harvestehuder foreland was designated as a public green space. However, only after a resolution pushed through the Senate in 1950 by Mayor Max Brauer to expropriate the small private gardens could a public park be created. Implementation occurred in 1953 on the occasion of the International Garden Show (IGA). According to the design by garden architect Gustav Lüttge (1909–1968), the Harvestehuder part of the Alsterpark was laid out with a promenade, bridges, a rondel, sculptures, and a pond. The Alsterpark runs entirely around the Außenalster. The Alstervorland also includes the ferry piers for Alster shipping, the Anleger Alte Rabenstraße at the start of Harvestehuder Weg and approximately in the middle the Anleger Fährdamm.

=== Eichenpark ===
At the end of the foreland, the Krugkoppelbrücke was built in 1892. In 1927/1928, Fritz Schumacher created the still-existing reinforced concrete bridge with brick optics in place of the first wooden construction. It marks the transition from the Alster river to the Alster lake, while its access road separates the Eichenpark from the Alstervorland. On both sides of the bridge is another Alster shipping pier, each for one direction of travel. While ships moor upstream at the part of the pier already belonging to Winterhude, a landing bridge at the Eichenpark is provided for the downstream Alster steamers. This green space, about 200 meters long, lies between the Alster and Harvestehuder Weg. As its name suggests, it is primarily planted with pedunculate oaks. Individual trees that survived the ravages of the French period are over 200 years old. The area belonged to the grounds of the former Harvestehude monastery; the site of the monastery buildings in the western part is built over. A memorial plaque contains the important dates in the history of the place. The park was laid out in 1785 on the pasture belonging to the monastery inn, the Krugkoppel, as an English landscape garden. At that time, excursions outside the city and to the monastery inn were very popular.

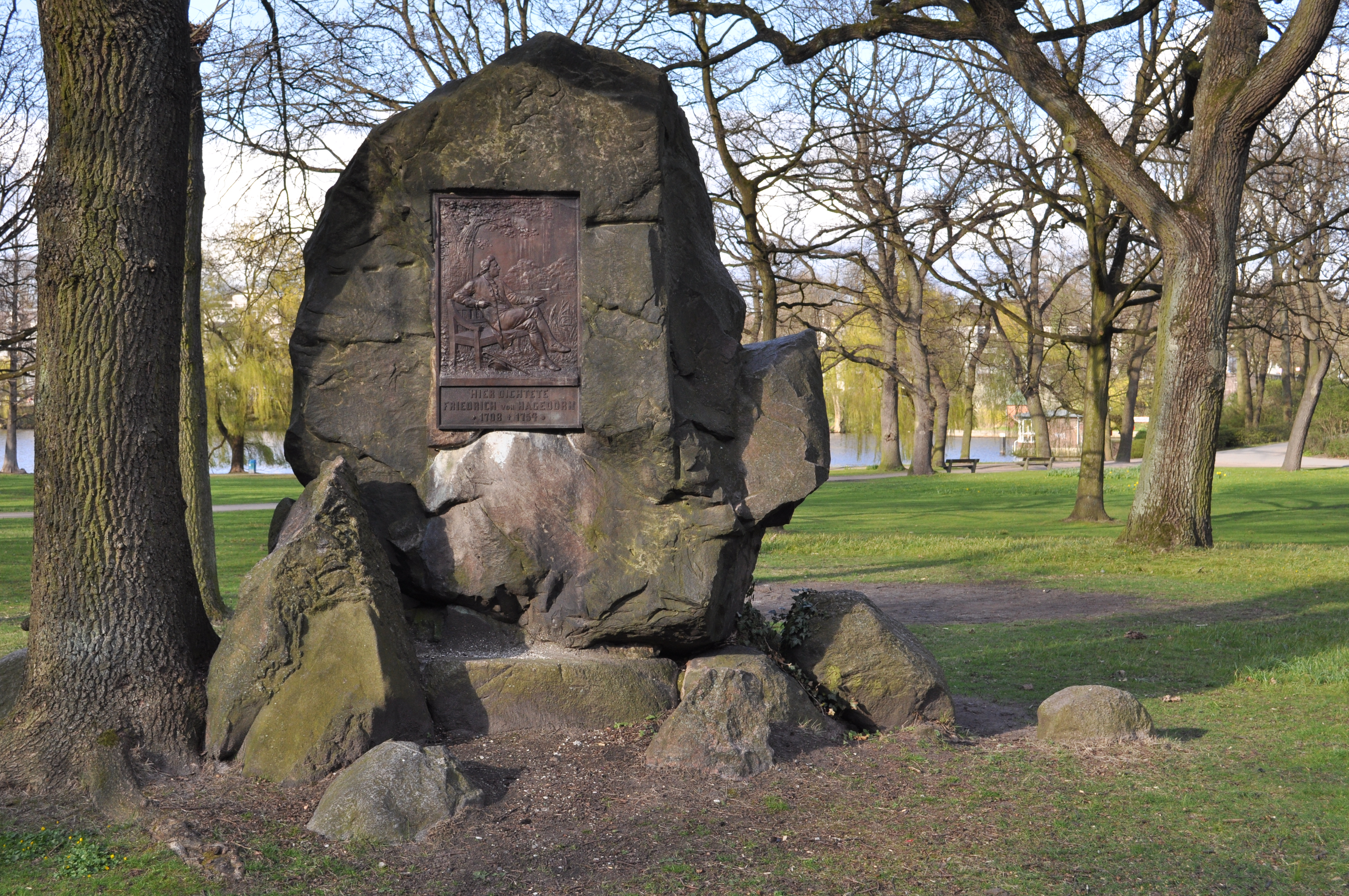
Hagedorn memorial in the Eichenpark

In 1897, after long discussions about the right location, the city of Hamburg placed a memorial stone to the poet Friedrich von Hagedorn (1708–1754) in this park, as it was said to have been one of his favorite places. He dedicated the poems Ode an die Alster and Harvestehude to them. It is also recorded that he often sat under a certain linden tree on the Licentiatenberg, which was called the Hagedorn linden for many years and served as his memorial.

Another monument also found its place in the park only after many years. On behalf of the Hamburg Senate, the sculptor Friedrich Wield (1880–1940), a member of the Hamburg Secession, created the bronze figure Ätherwelle between 1931 and 1933. It commemorates the physicist and son of the city Heinrich Hertz (1857–1894), who in 1886 proved the existence of electromagnetic waves. However, the Nazi regime prevented its erection because Hertz was Jewish. Only through the initiative of Boris Kegel-Konietzko, the heir and administrator of Friedrich Wield's estate, was the plaster figure restored in 1985 by the sculptor Manfred Sihle-Wissel and cast in bronze in 1987 by the Schmäke Art Foundry in Düsseldorf. The monument was initially to be erected in the green space in front of the NDR studio at Rothenbaumchaussee, but in 1994 it temporarily found its place on the Alster bank. Since 2016, it stands in front of the studio.

=== St. Nikolai ===
The Harvestehude Nikolai Church and its community buildings occupy plots Nos. 112 to 118. The ensemble was built in the early 1960s, and the church was consecrated in 1962 as the new fifth Hamburg main church to replace the war-destroyed former St. Nikolai Church at Hopfenmarkt in downtown Hamburg, which serves as a memorial. It was designed by architects Gerhard Langmaack and Dieter Langmaack; in its furnishings, it corresponds to the old church; thus, the altar painting Ecce Homines (Behold the People) designed by Oskar Kokoschka in 1974 is a counterpart to the same mosaic in black-and-white execution in the chancel of the memorial church. The large church window was designed by glass painter Elisabeth Coester (1900–1941) for the old church but not installed due to the war. Thus, it found its undestroyed place in the entrance hall of the current Nikolai Church. For many years, the church was a meeting point for the Easter March movement.

The previous owner of the property in the 19th century was the senior elder Johann Jürgen Nicolas Albrecht. Around 1900, it was built with villas. In 1911, Otto Meyer, sole owner of the firm Otto Meyer jr., lived at No. 114, and the director of the Vereinsbank Hamburg, Christian E. Frege, at No. 116.

=== Böckmannscher Garten ===
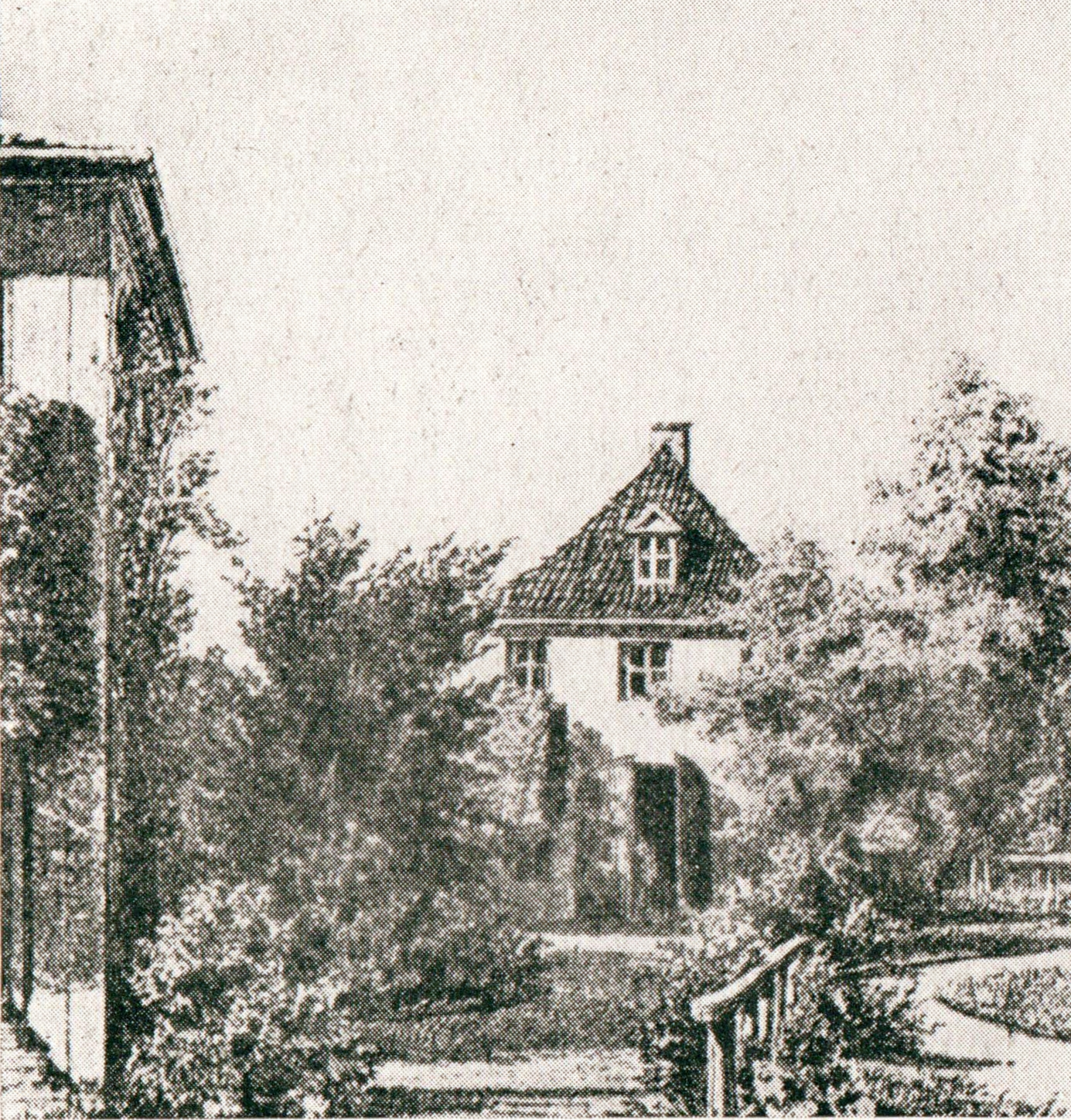
Farm buildings of the Böckmann gardens, detail from a lithograph by Valentin Ruths, circa 1850

Until 1856, the Böckmannsche Garten existed on the property with house numbers 1 to 4. The Böckmann family had leased the land from Alte Rabenstraße to Milchstraße since 1680 over several generations and used it as garden land. From the early 19th century, individual plots on Harvestehuder Weg were gradually sold off; the corner plot with the nursery's farm buildings was the last in the family's possession. Around 1880, it too was built on, creating a large residential house in Tudor style that bore house numbers 1 to 4 as a terraced villa. The house was not aligned with the following individual villas and was significantly set forward toward the street. Under this address around the turn of the century lived several personalities of the city, including the silk manufacturer and founder of the Vaterstädtische Stiftung, Johann Rudolf Warburg and his wife Bernhardine Warburg (1870–1925) and the millionaire F.F. Smith. During National Socialism, the buildings housed the Hamburg office of the Kriegsmarine. It was destroyed in the war.

In 1953, the property was redeveloped in an overall design of the corner plots on Alte Rabenstraße by architect Ferdinand Streb. A counterpart building was created to the opposite Iduna-Germania building, with the cubic corner building set as a counterpoint to its sweeping south wing. The administrative building was erected for Vela Insurance; in the 1960s, Deutsche Grammophon moved into the house. After renovation, the entrance was relocated; since then, it serves as an office building with various tenants and is accessible only via Alte Rabenstraße 32; the address Harvestehuder Weg 1–4 was abolished.

=== Slomanburg ===
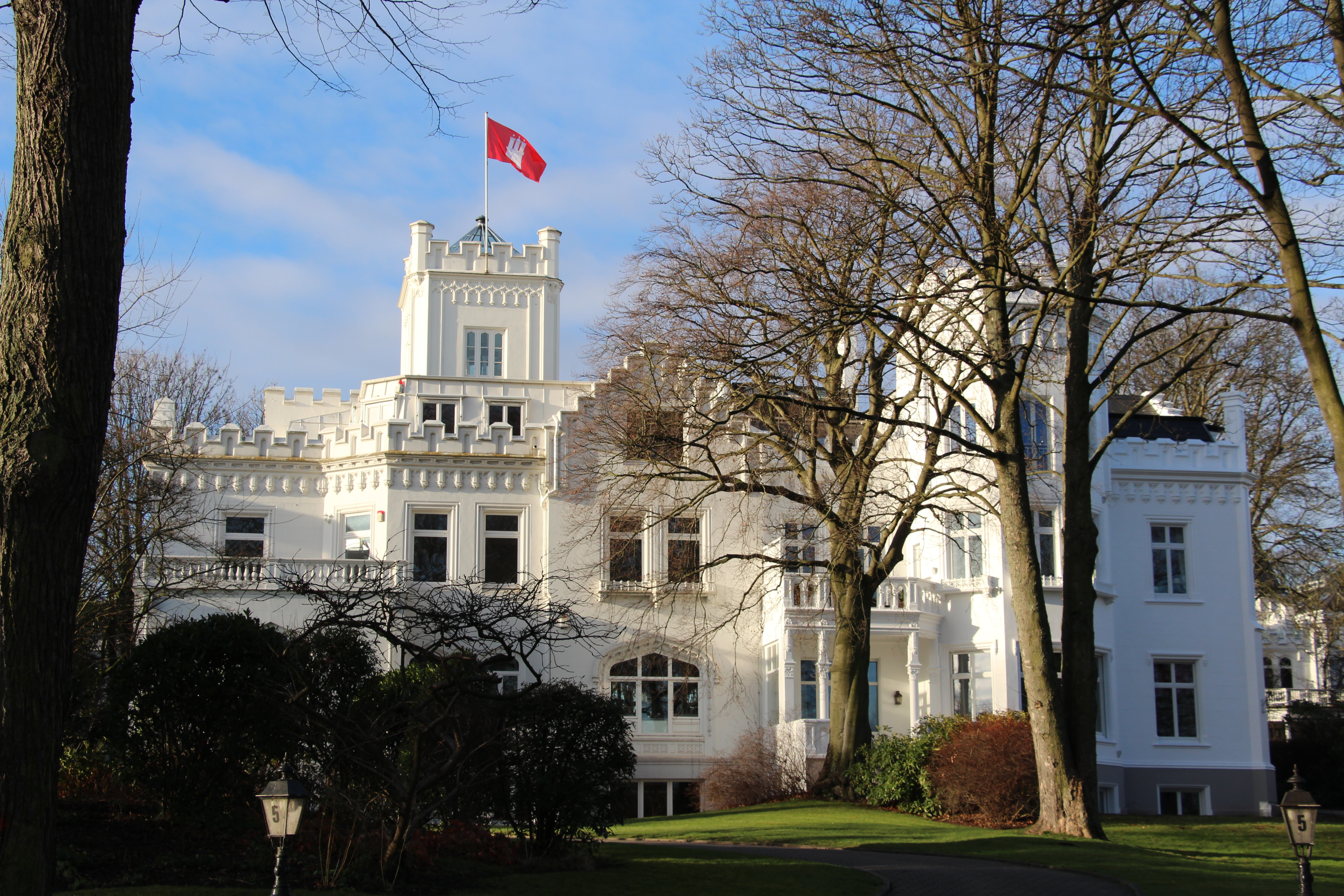
The Slomanburg, 2013

The double villa was built in 1848 on the Böckmann nursery property by architect Jean David Jollasse with No. 5 for shipowner Robert Miles Sloman (1783–1867) and No. 6 for merchant and senator Ascan Wilhelm Lutteroth (1783–1867). Because of its castle-like appearance with towers, stepped gables, and a main cornice with battlements, it is also called Slomanburg. It was the first building on Harvestehuder Weg designed as a main residence:

When my father and Mr. Sloman had their villas built on Harvestehuder Weg in 1848 with the intention of living in them in winter too, many of their friends shook their heads, for given the complete lack of the comforts taken for granted today, it was considered a certain risk to spend the winter at such a distance from the city, outside its gates with the gate closure.

— Arthur Lutteroth, Harvestehude sixty years ago, lecture 1910

In 1911, merchants Louis and Ad. Th. Des Arts from a Huguenot family lived in the left half; both were partners in the firm Des Arts & Co. and among Hamburg's richest families. Louis Des Arts owned this part of the building. The right half belonged to another millionaire, district judge Martin Anton Popert. Since 1972, the entire villa has been listed.

=== Horschitz villas ===
The plots with house numbers 7 and 8 were parcelled several times toward the end of the 19th century, so that in the official numbering, the intermediate numbers a and b were assigned. On plot No. 7, the Sthamersches Landhaus of the Sthamer family was built in 1852. In 1883, Robert Miles Sloman jun. (1812–1900) took over the site and had a year-round habitable villa built. In 1890, he left it to his daughter Stefani Brödermann (1848–1945), who lived there until her death and in 1911 was considered one of the city's richest women. Around 1970, the property together with the neighboring plot No. 7a was redeveloped with an apartment building. In addition to the apartment, the Chilean consulate general is also located there. The site still belongs to the heirs of the Sloman family.

Plots Nos. 7a, 7b, and 8 belonged in the mid-19th century to the Doormann family, who had their country house there. Around 1870, merchant Sally Horschitz (1822–1883) acquired them and in 1872 had architect Albert Rosengarten build a villa in neoclassical tradition with belvedere, portico, and triangular gable at No. 8. As early as 1879, he sold the house again and had another villa built to its left at No. 7b. Plot 7a was also built on in 1879; here lived captain and merchant Johannes Lühmann. In 1921, he had to file for bankruptcy and sell the villa. In 1890, the Prussian legation moved into house No. 7b; in 1912, the older Horschitz villa No. 8 was added. From 1921 to 1945, the city of Hamburg took over all three villas for the Oberfinanzdirektion.

After the war, the authority limited itself to building No. 7b; in 1967, it moved to Harvestehuder Weg 14. House No. 7a was demolished around 1970 and overbuilt together with plot No. 7. The Horschitz villa at No. 8 was in the public interest from 2000 due to expensive renovation and multiple sales.

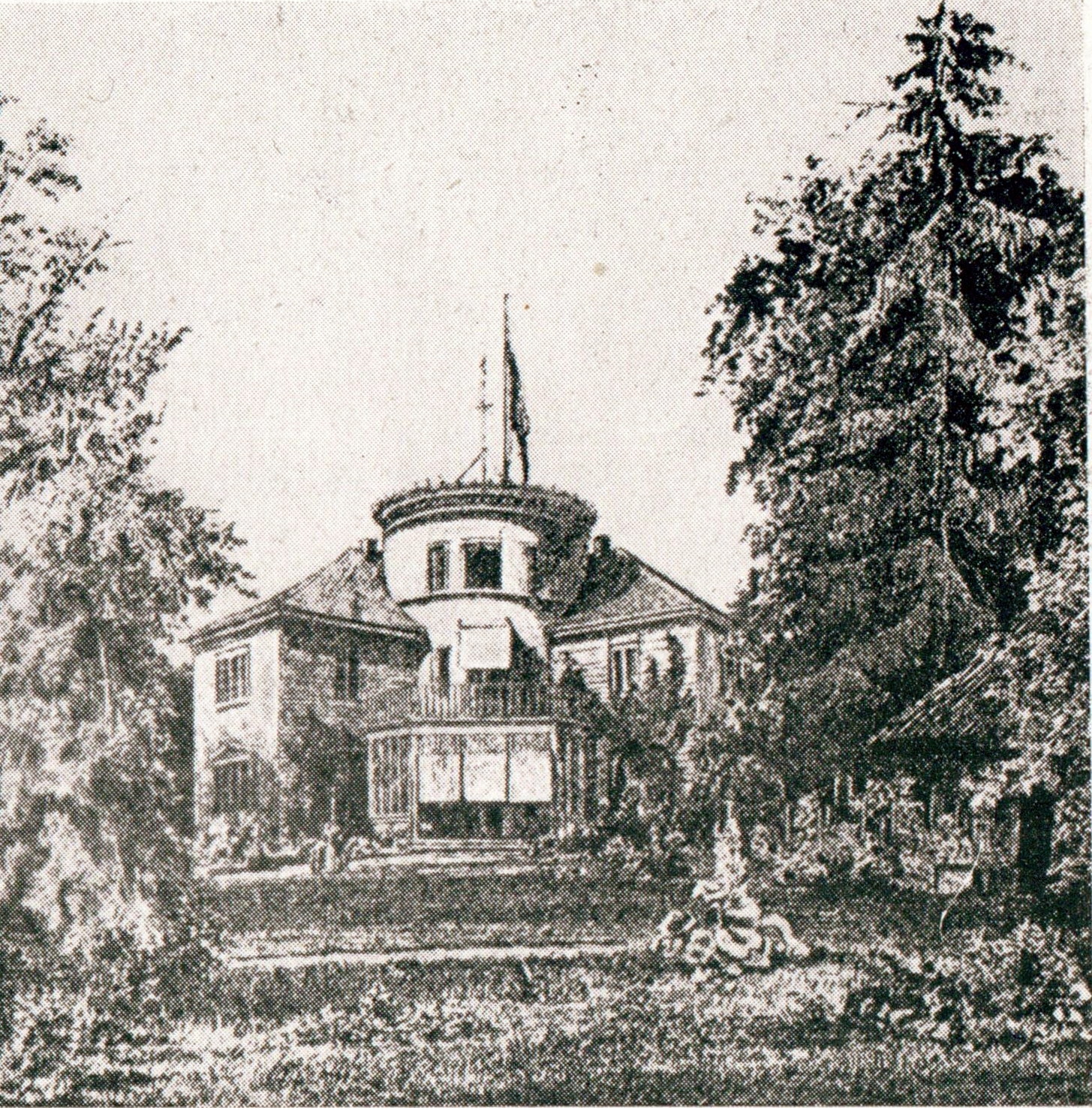
House No. 7: Sthamersches Landhaus circa 1850

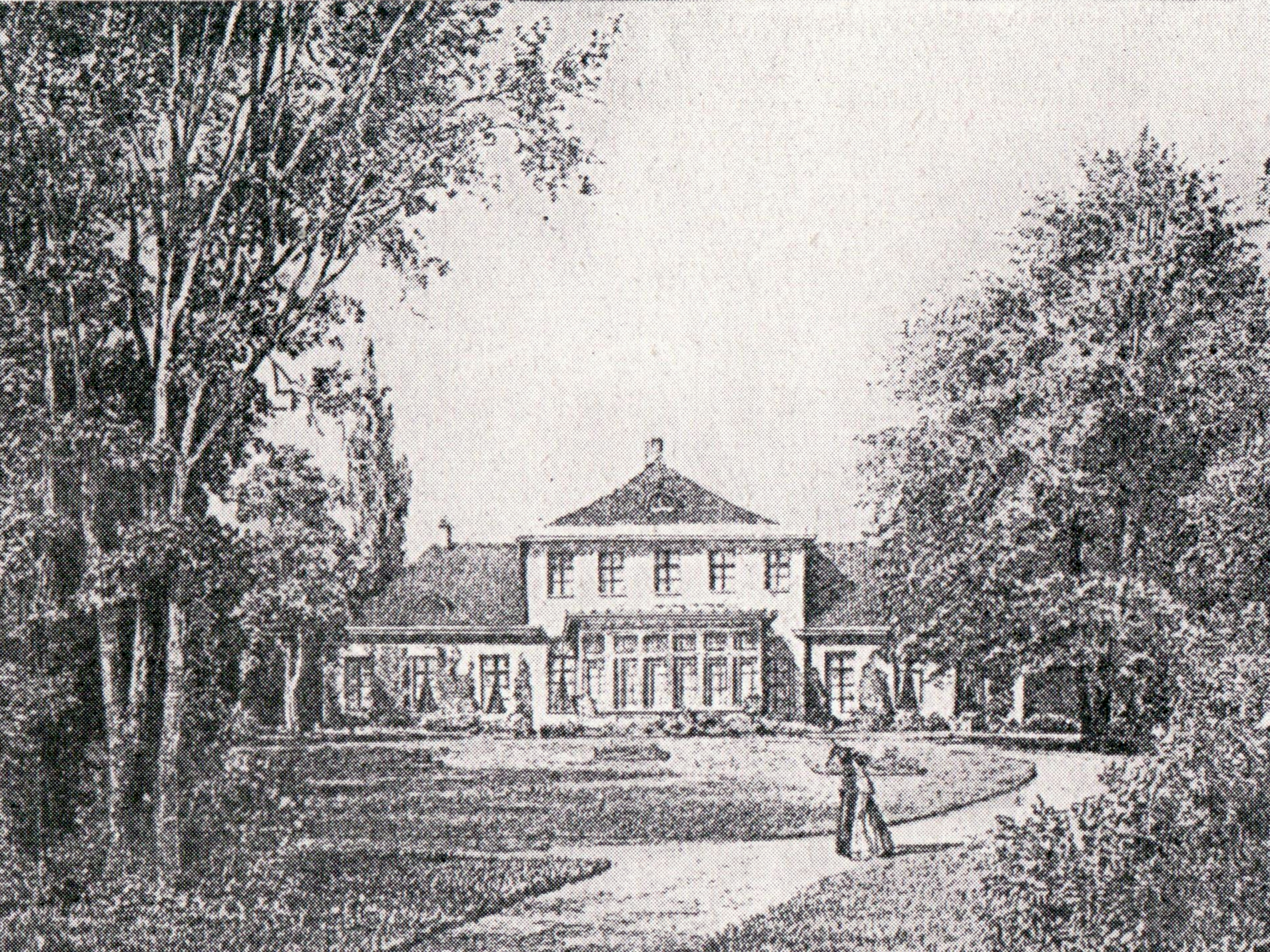
House No. 8: Doormanns Landhaus circa 1850

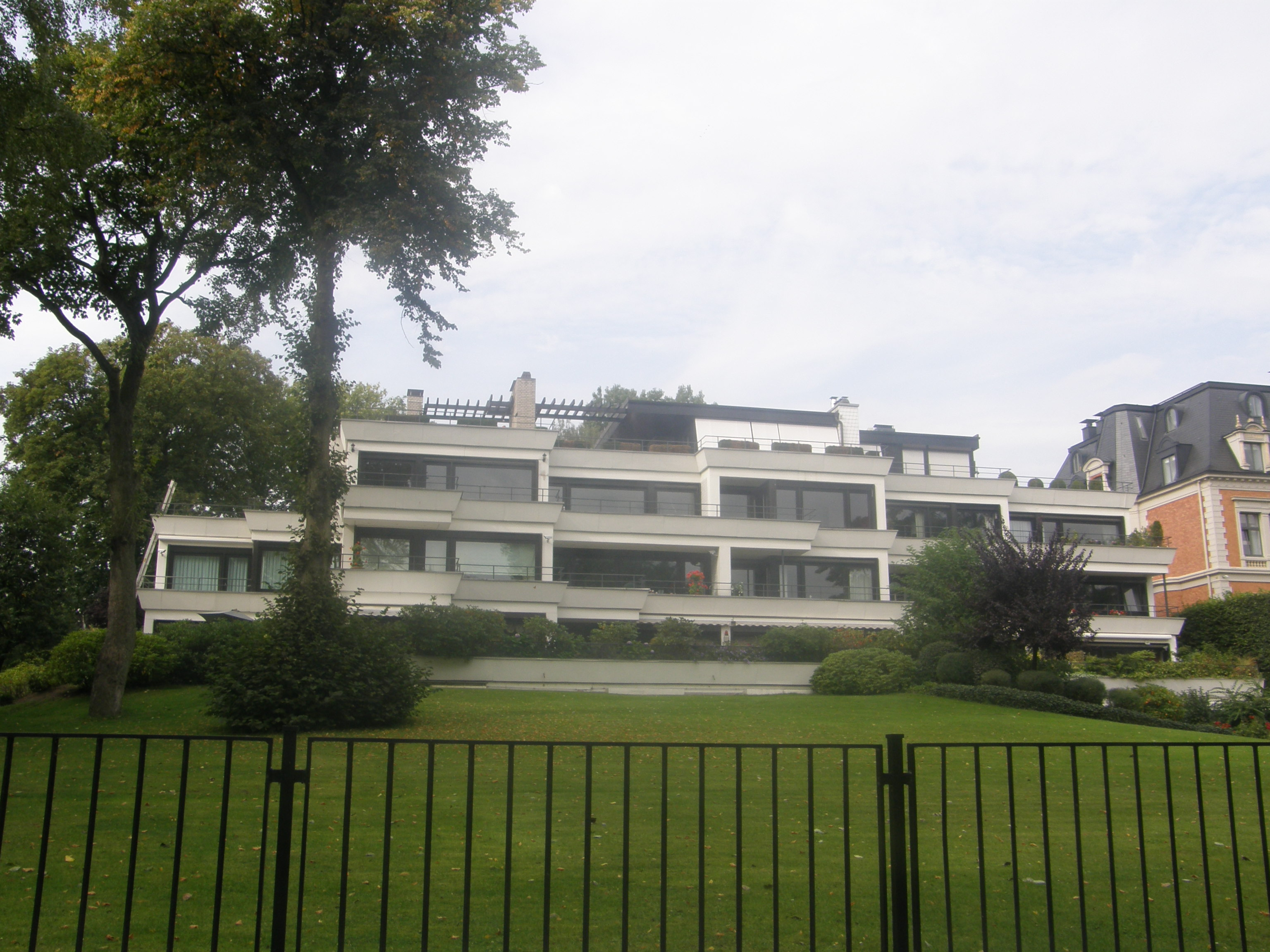
House Nos. 7 and 7a, since 1970

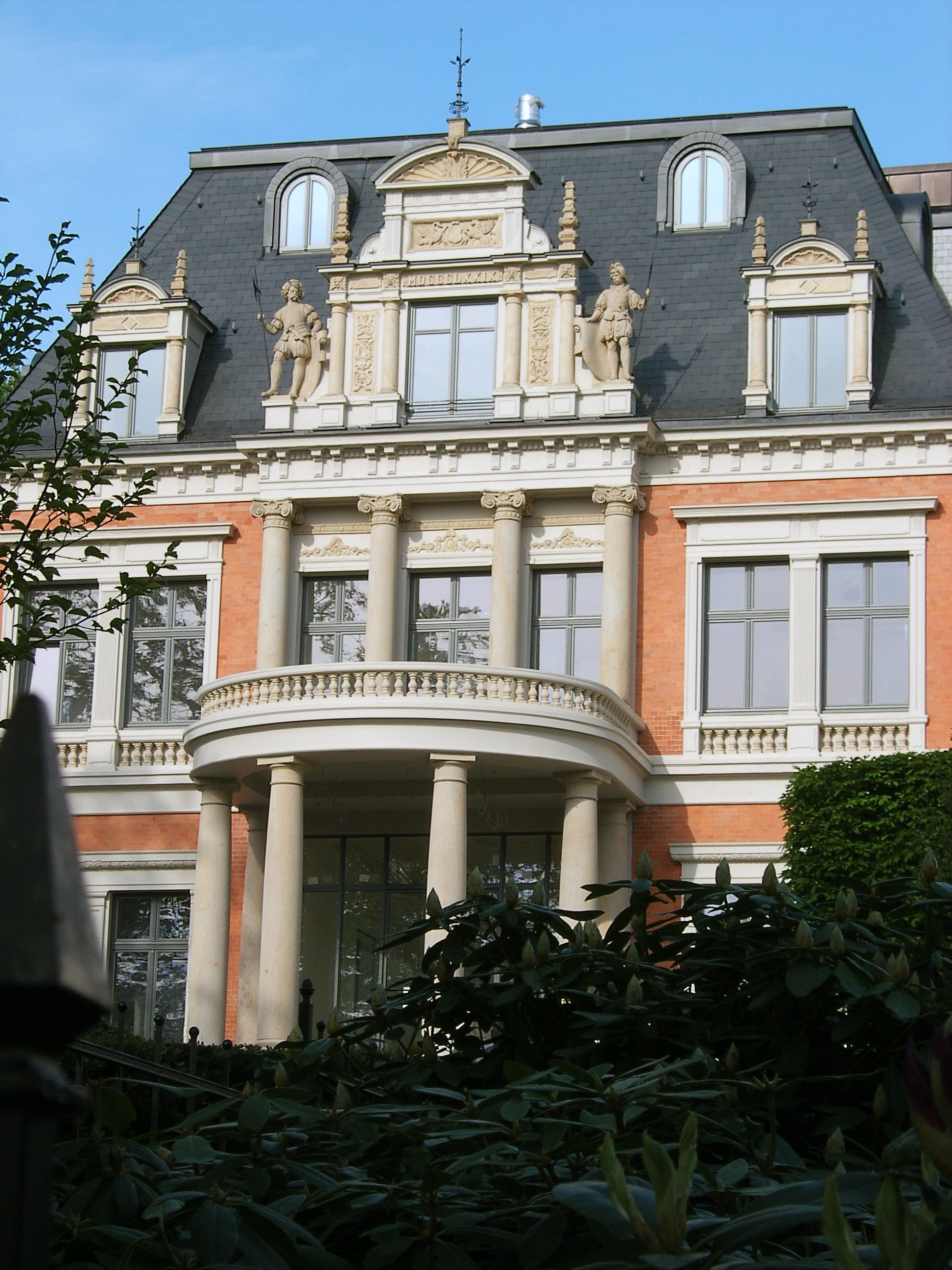
House No. 7b: Villa Horschitz II from 1879

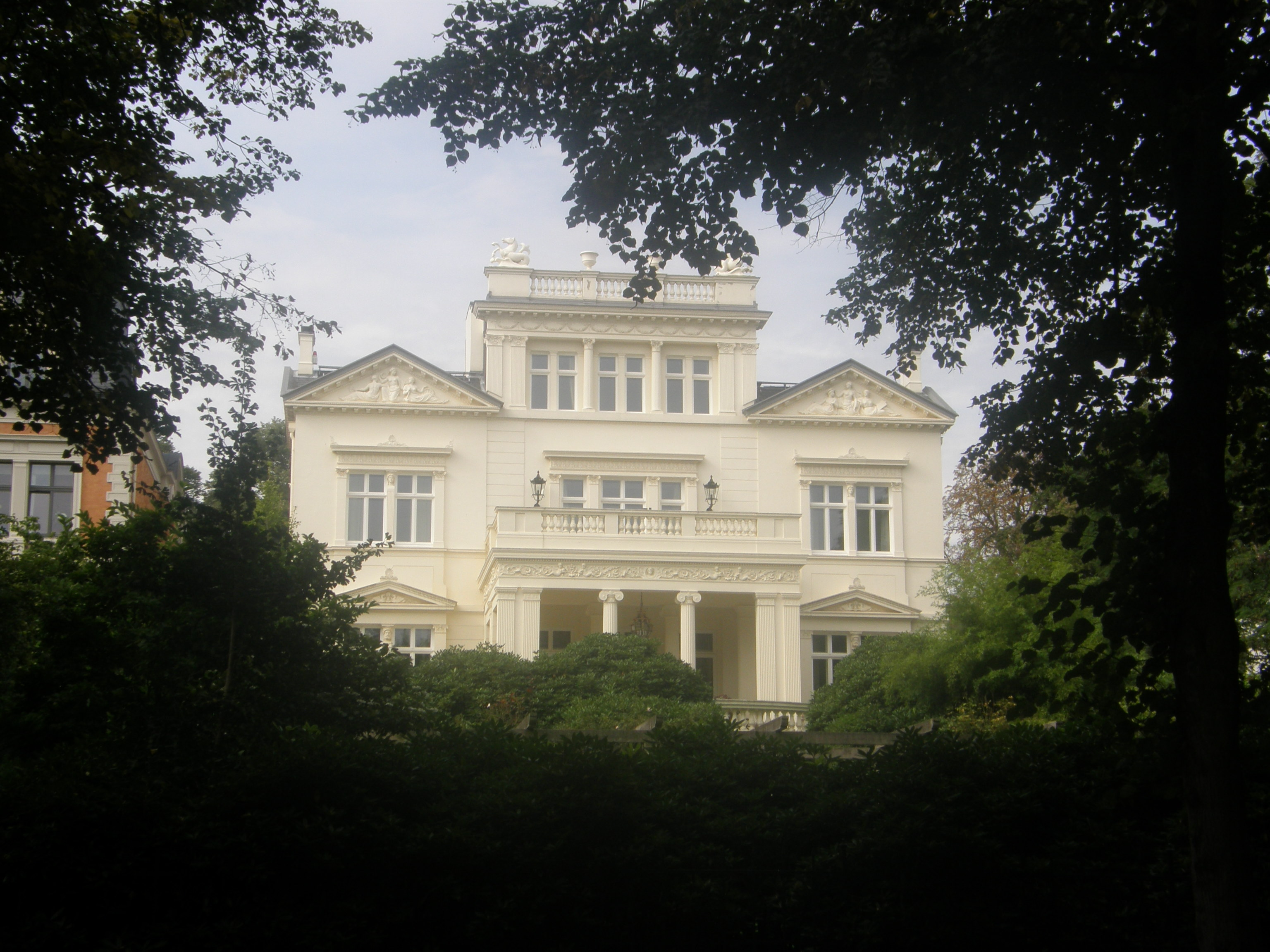
House No. 8: Villa Horschitz from 1872

=== Villa Laeisz ===
The property with house number 8a was acquired as early as 1870 by shipowner Carl Laeisz (1828–1901). After his death, his widow Sophie Laeisz (1831–1912) had the villa built in 1905/1906 by architect Ernst Paul Dorn; it was to become her retirement home. The building is considered restrained Art Nouveau, overlaid with late Baroque forms, and emphasizes the center of the house facade with its articulation scheme of columns and balconies. The pavilion-like extensions are seen as a reminiscence of architect Martin Haller.

After Sophie Laeisz's death, the villa remained in family ownership for two more years and was occupied by her grandson Erich Laeisz (1888–1958), heir to the shipping company. In 1914, merchant Hermann Fölsch, who had become rich in the Chilean saltpeter business, took over the house. Between 1920 and 1923, he had extensive renovations carried out by architect Georg Radel. In 1928, the house passed to son Conrad Johann Fölsch. The stock market crash of 1929 led to the collapse of the Fölsch firm; the company had to be liquidated in 1930, and the house's furnishings as well as numerous antiques, collection, and art objects were auctioned in June 1931. The house itself could apparently be kept initially; Conrad Fölsch lived there until 1934.

In April 1934, the villa was purchased by the coordinated Hamburg Senate; the circumstances suggest it was a forced sale, with the purchase price 115,000 Reichsmarks instead of the estimated value of 238,000 Reichsmarks. The purchase occurred on orders from the SS (Oberabschnitt Nord-West), which took over the house and set up its office there. This procedure was legally covered by an order from the Reich Minister of Finance of March 3, 1934, according to which state and public buildings had to be handed over to the NSDAP and its subdivisions. Until 1945, numerous conversions and extensions were made, from 1942 using prisoners from Neuengamme concentration camp.

After the capture of Hamburg, British troops requisitioned the buildings and initially used them as storage and clothing chamber. In 1949, Landeskommissar and later British consul general John K. Dunlop had it fitted out as a "residential and guest house for own purposes"; with another conversion, he expanded the house in 1952 for the British Consulate General, which resided there until piet2006. In 1986, the building was listed. In May 2008, the Sal. Oppenheim private bank took over the villa.

=== Musikhochschule ===
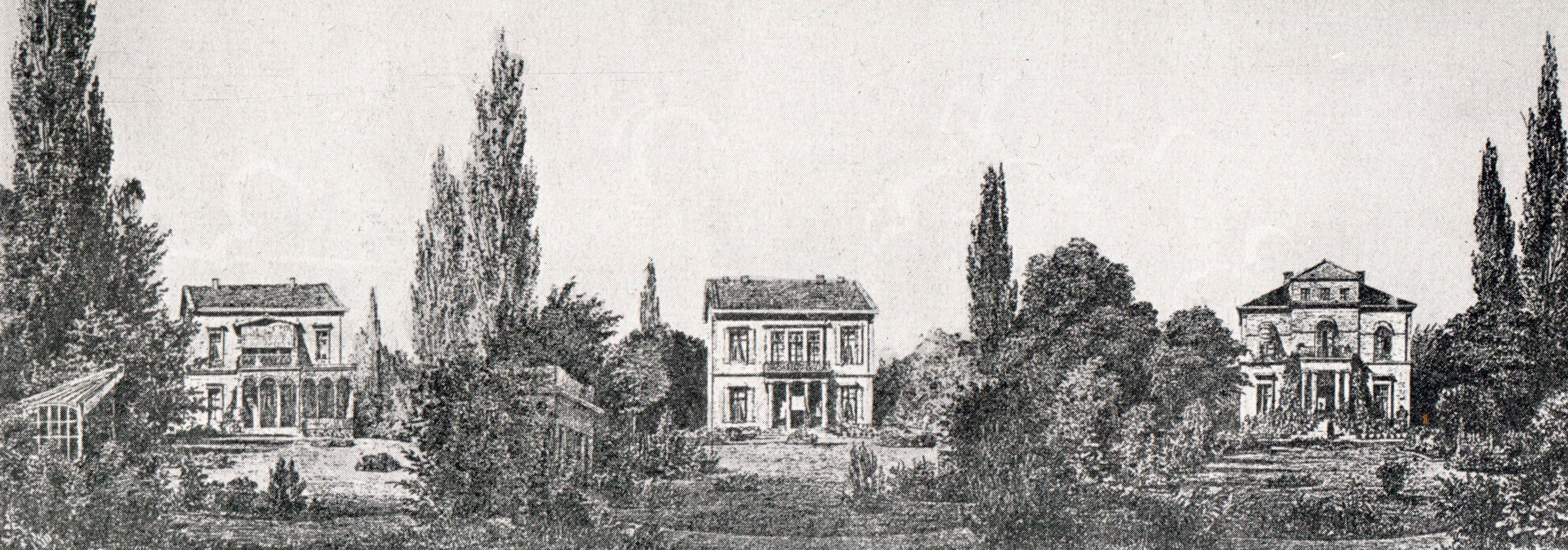
The country houses of the Hellmrich, Albrecht, and Sloman families circa 1850

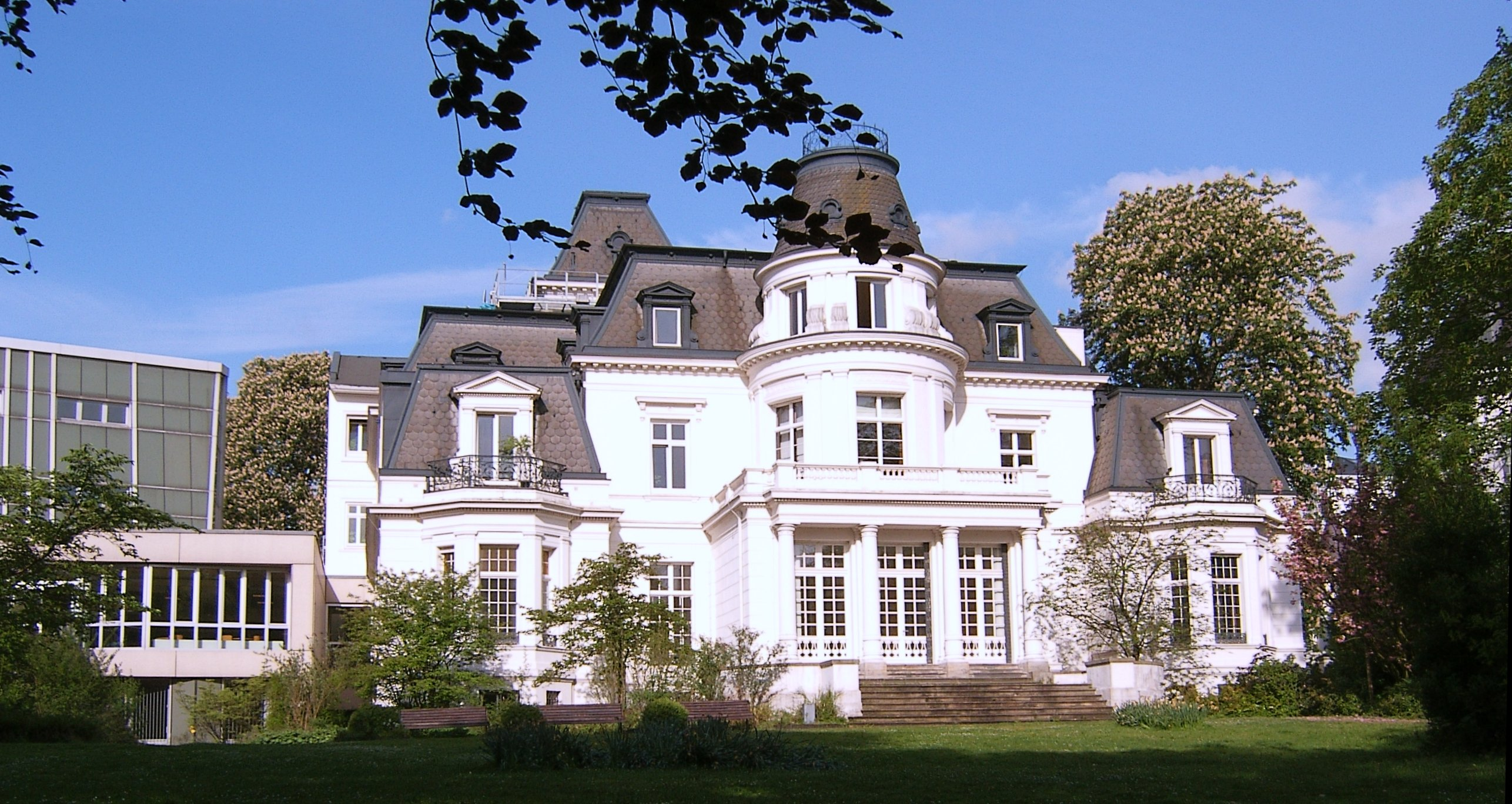
Budge Palais of the Musikhochschule, 2006

In the mid-19th century, the country houses of Hamburg families H. A. Hellmrich, S. Albrecht, and Robert Miles Sloman were on plots Nos. 10 to 12. Plot No. 11 was built with a villa in 1872, in which millionaire S. Löwenstein and later interior architect Kurt Clavier lived. On plot No. 12, architect Martin Haller built a house in 1884 for ship broker Ivan Gans. Around 1900, Henry (1840–1927) and Emma Budge (1852–1937) bought it and had Haller expand it into the later so-called Budge Palais. Still visible from the Gans villa are the central two-story tract and the two outer wings with bay windows. Toward the Alster, the building was expanded with the semicircular central risalit and the built-out steep roofs. In 1909/1910, a hall extension was added on the back, fitted out as a mirror hall for private theater and music performances. Plot No. 10 was built in 1910 for Hermann Blohm (1848–1930), founder of the Blohm + Voss shipyard; to distinguish it from other family buildings on Harvestehuder Weg, it was called Villa Blohm I.

These three villas served during National Socialism as office and residence of Hamburg Reichsstatthalter Karl Kaufmann; in his second function as Gauleiter, he resided in the large villa at Alsterufer 27, today's American Consulate General. In 1935, Kaufmann first acquired the Blohm family villa at No. 10 and set up an administrative building there. He then made a purchase offer to Emma Budge, which she refused. After her death in 1937, the city of Hamburg, through pressure on the Jewish heirs and executors, brought the house into its possession. This disregarded Emma Budge's last will, who in 1932 had negotiated an agreement with then state councilor Leo Lippmann for the donation of the house to the city, but revoked it in her will after the Nazi seizure of power and expressly provided that the house should not pass into Hamburg's ownership. The last residents of the villa, Henry Budge's nephew Siegfried Budge (1869–1941) and his wife Ella Budge (1875–1943), had to leave the house after the transfer of ownership; both died during further persecution by the Nazis.

The owner of house No. 11, Kurt Clavier, wanted to sell his house to the Egyptian consulate in 1938, but the necessary permit was denied. Instead, the Hamburg property management company took the villa into trust and sold it in 1939 at a significantly reduced price to the city of Hamburg. Clavier's assets were secured by the Oberfinanzdirektion with a security order under foreign exchange law; Clavier managed to emigrate to South Africa.

The Reichsstatthalterei moved into the Budge Palais in 1938 (the villas on plots Nos. 10 and 11 were integrated into the complex as administrative tracts and employee houses). On the rear property between Nos. 10 and 11, Kaufmann had a bunker built for himself and his staff in 1939/1940. This was listed in April 2010.

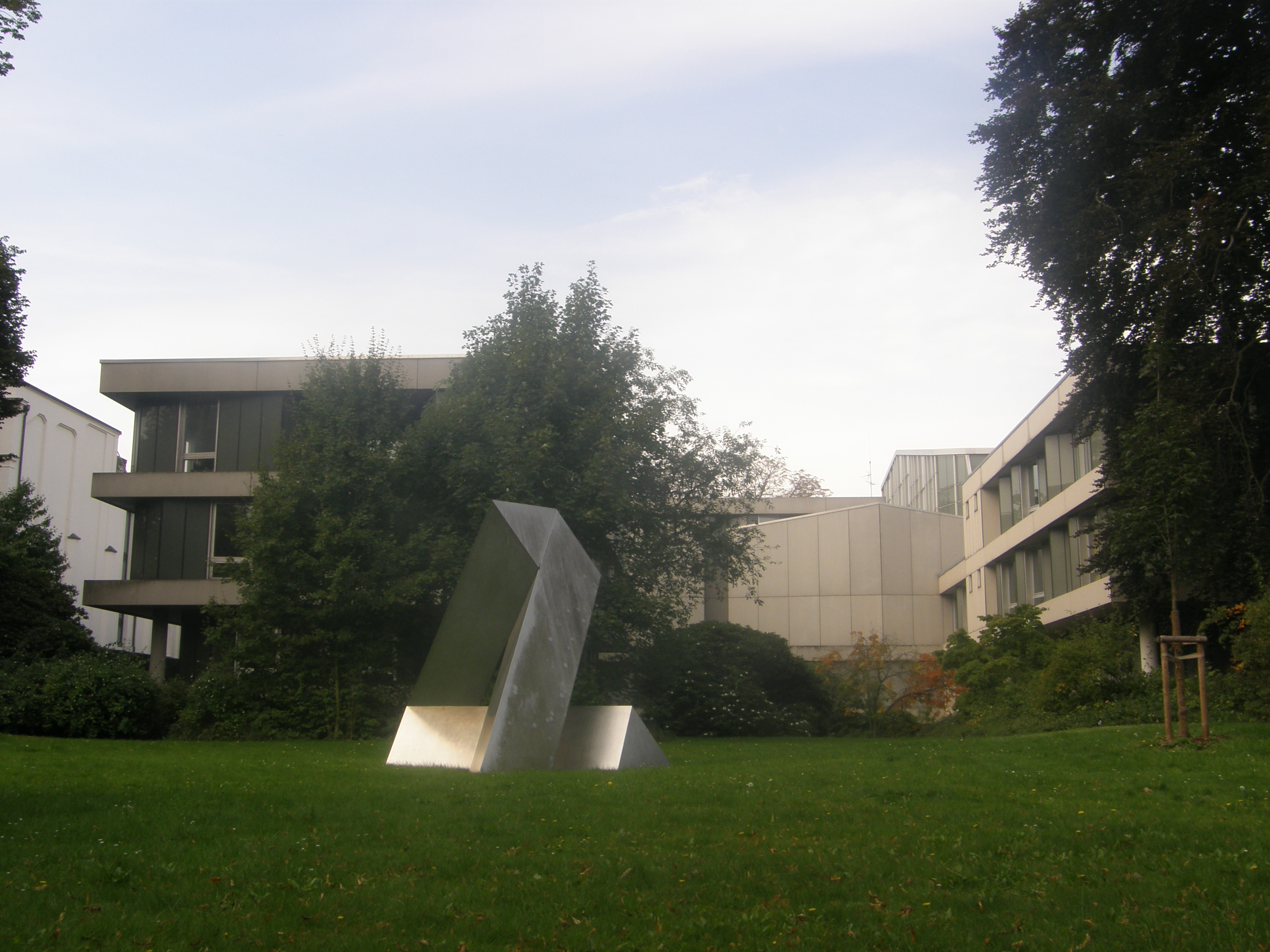
Extensions of the Musikhochschule and the sculpture Dreiklang by Jan Meyer-Rogge

In 1945, British troops requisitioned the three buildings and occupied them until 1955. In house No. 10, forensic medicine was temporarily housed. In a restitution procedure, the executor appointed by the Nazis and not removed after 1945 negotiated a settlement with the city of Hamburg over the Harvestehuder Weg 12 property complex without notifying the heirs living in the USA. On November 10, 1952, following a decision by the Hamburg Regional Court, the Budge Palais including the adjacent properties was sold to the city for an additional payment of 22,500 DM.

Since 1959, the Budge Palais has been used by the University of Music and Theater. For its expansion, the former Blohm villa was demolished in 1960 and the former Clavier villa in 1964; the 1909 mirror hall was dismantled. Its interior could be accommodated in the Museum of Arts and Crafts and reconstructed there in 1986. The university extensions were built between 1969 and 1982 according to designs by architect Fritz Trautwein (1911–1993). In 1974, artist Jan Meyer-Rogge created the light metal sculpture Dreiklang, installed in front of former house number 11. Since 1993, a bronze plaque at the Milchstraße entrance commemorates Henry and Emma Budge, and in summer 2007, two Stolpersteine were set in the sidewalk in memory of Ella and Siegfried Budge.

=== Villa Beit and Villa Behrens ===
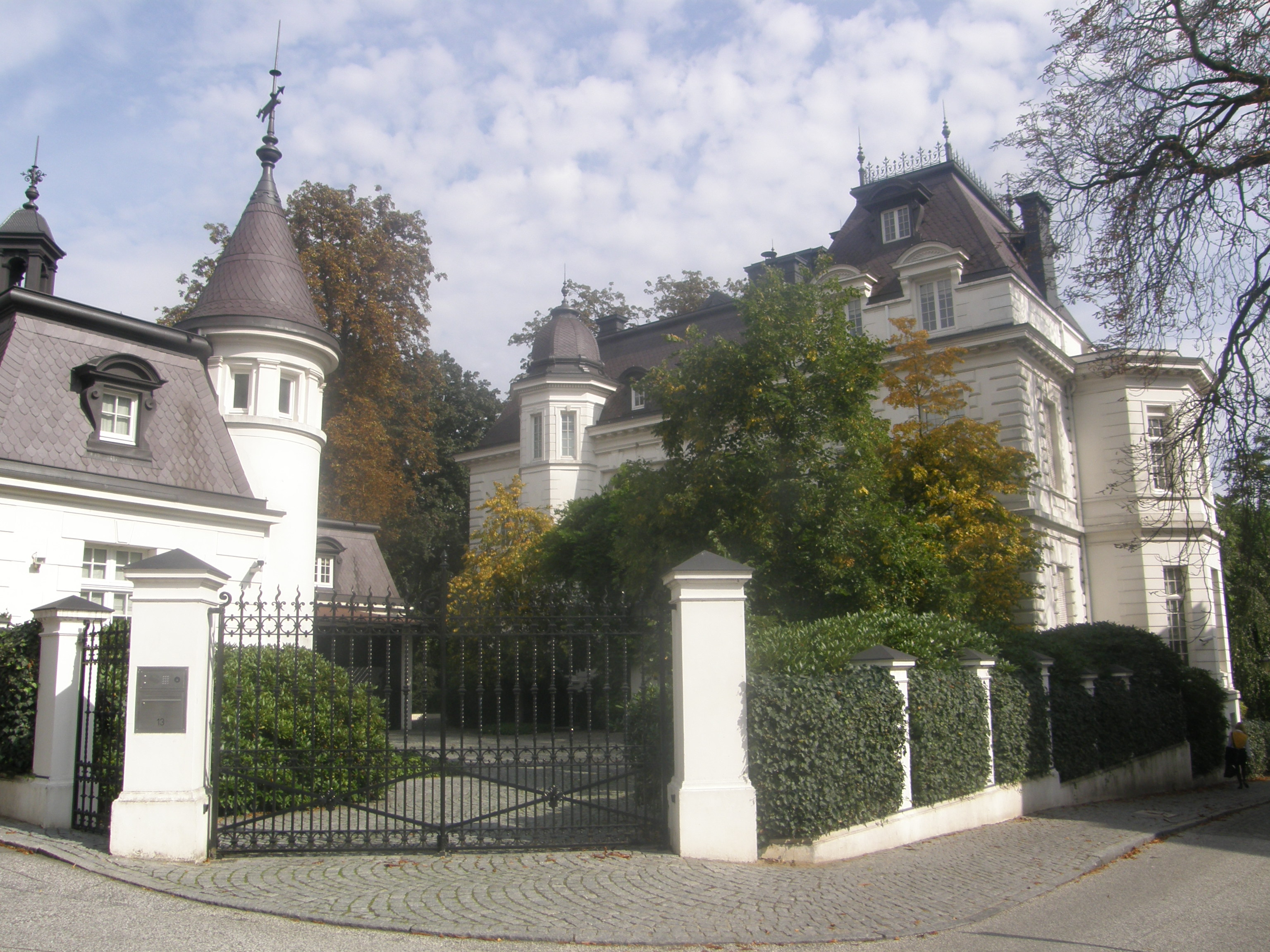
Villa Beit: Entrance area at Milchstraße

Plots Nos. 13 to 15 were also partially built with country houses of notable Hamburg families in the mid-19th century. At No. 13 stood the summer house of merchant Johann Friedrich Carl Refardt sen. (1800–1871), which he had bought in 1848. His heirs sold the property in November 1886 to Moritz Gustav Warburg. In 1890/1891, architect Martin Haller built an imposing house in its place for Johanna Beit, widow of chemist Ferdinand Beit (1817–1870). After her death, her son Ferdinand Beit jun. (1858–1928) inherited the villa. Notable in this building are especially the carriage house and farm buildings with numerous turrets and extensions in the courtyard of the entrance area at Milchstraße, called cour d’honneur.

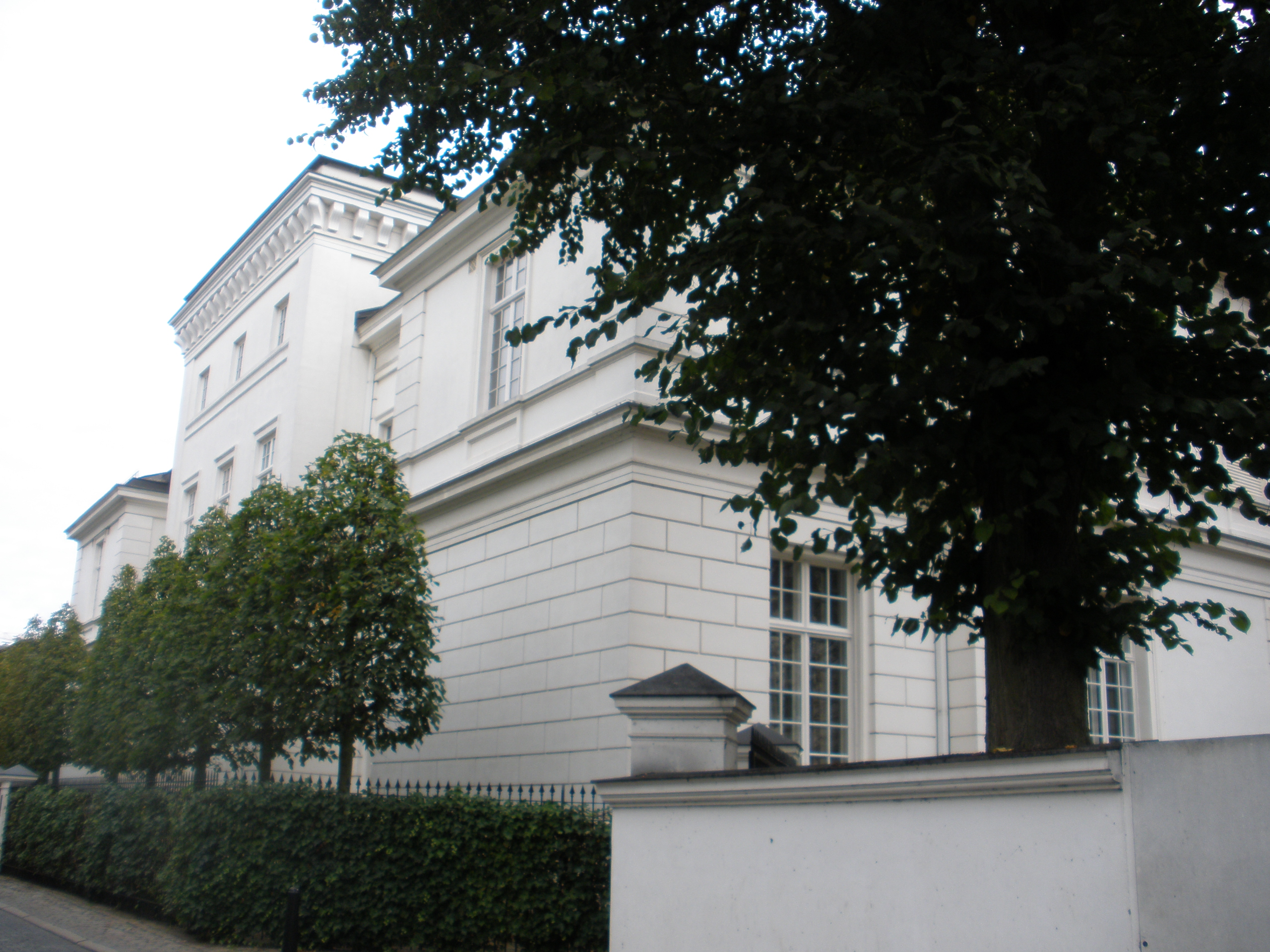
Villa Behrens from the rear view at Pöseldorfer Weg

No. 14 was a house built in 1845 by architect Alexis de Chateauneuf for Frau von Heß, née Hudtwalcker, and No. 15 belonged to merchant C. F. Michahelles. On plot No. 14, Haller had already built a residence in 1866 for merchant Isaac Joseph Jaffé (1806–1890). Banker Eduard L. Behrens bought it in 1896 together with the neighboring plot No. 15. Haller was commissioned with the expansion and merging of the buildings. A long-stretched building was created, reminiscent of a palace complex. Together with the Budge Palais, this row of large white-plastered villas by architect Haller is considered the epitome of Alster architecture. Owners Beit and Behrens belonged to Hamburg's richest families until the Nazi era; they were considered generous patrons and supported materially and ideally, among others, the expansion of the Hamburger Kunsthalle and the University of Hamburg. They were assimilated Jews, baptized Protestant, and partially related and connected by marriage to other Hamburg merchant families. In particular, they belonged through their economic and political activities to the Hamburg oligarchy. After the seizure of power, the Nazis intervened in the asset situation; both the Beit heirs and the Behrens family had to sell their properties and villas on Harvestehuder Weg to the city of Hamburg. Employees of the Reichsstatthalterei moved into Villa Beit; Villa Behrens was occupied by the Wehrmacht from 1939.

After the war, the British requisitioned the villas; until 1950, among other things, a British officers' mess was housed there. From 1952, Olympic Maritime, a shipping company in the empire of Aristotle Onassis, resided in No. 13; the house was converted for its purposes by architect Cäsar Pinnau. In 1967, the Oberfinanzdirektion moved into villa No. 14. Both villas were acquired in the late 1990s by fashion designer Jil Sander; the fashion company Jil Sander Collection GmbH is housed in No. 14. Since 1993, the houses including their outbuildings and carriage houses have been listed.

=== Country houses Eybe and Amsinck ===
The properties with house numbers 18 to 20 have the longest building history in the former garden land. Thus, architect Johann August Arens built a country house at Nos. 18/19 in 1795/1796 for senator Nicolaus Bernhard Eybe (1749–1821) and in 1802 on the neighboring plot No. 20 a country house for the family of Hamburg mayor Wilhelm Amsinck (1752–1831). His father Paul Amsinck (1714–1777) had already acquired the property in 1776. Both houses were destroyed in 1813 during the French period and subsequently rebuilt. Around 1850, the country houses of the sons Wilhelm Eybe (1783–1852), also senator, and Johannes Amsinck (1792–1879), merchant, were at the same location.

Plot Nos. 18 and 19 were parcelled at the end of the 19th century; two villas were created. In 1911, lawyer Wilhelm Anton Riedemann, co-founder of the Deutsch-Amerikanische Petroleum Gesellschaft, lived at No. 18, and Gerhard Bruns, partner in the timber import firm Goßmann & Jürgens and co-founder of the Hamburger Wissenschaftliche Stiftung, at No. 19. In 1925, Rudolf Blohm took over plot No. 19 and had it built with a villa, the so-called Villa Blohm II. Due to his involvement in Nazi armaments policy, this house was requisitioned by the British occupation in 1945. In the 1950s, it was converted into a multi-family house. Prominent tenants were Gustaf Gründgens and Oscar Fritz Schuh. Plot No. 19 was also redeveloped around 1930. A two-story brick office building with a high columned entrance was created, which is still used as such today. Among others, the container leasing company of former economics senator Ian Karan is based here.

Plot No. 20 remained in the possession of the Amsinck family. In 1885, Martin Haller built a representative villa for shipowner Martin Garlieb Amsinck (1831–1905) in place of the old country house. After Martin Amsinck's death, his daughter Clara and son-in-law, later Hamburg mayor Max Predöhl (1854–1923), moved into the house. During World War II, the building was destroyed in a bombing raid. In 1953, a large neoclassical villa was built there, which housed the French consulate until 2004.

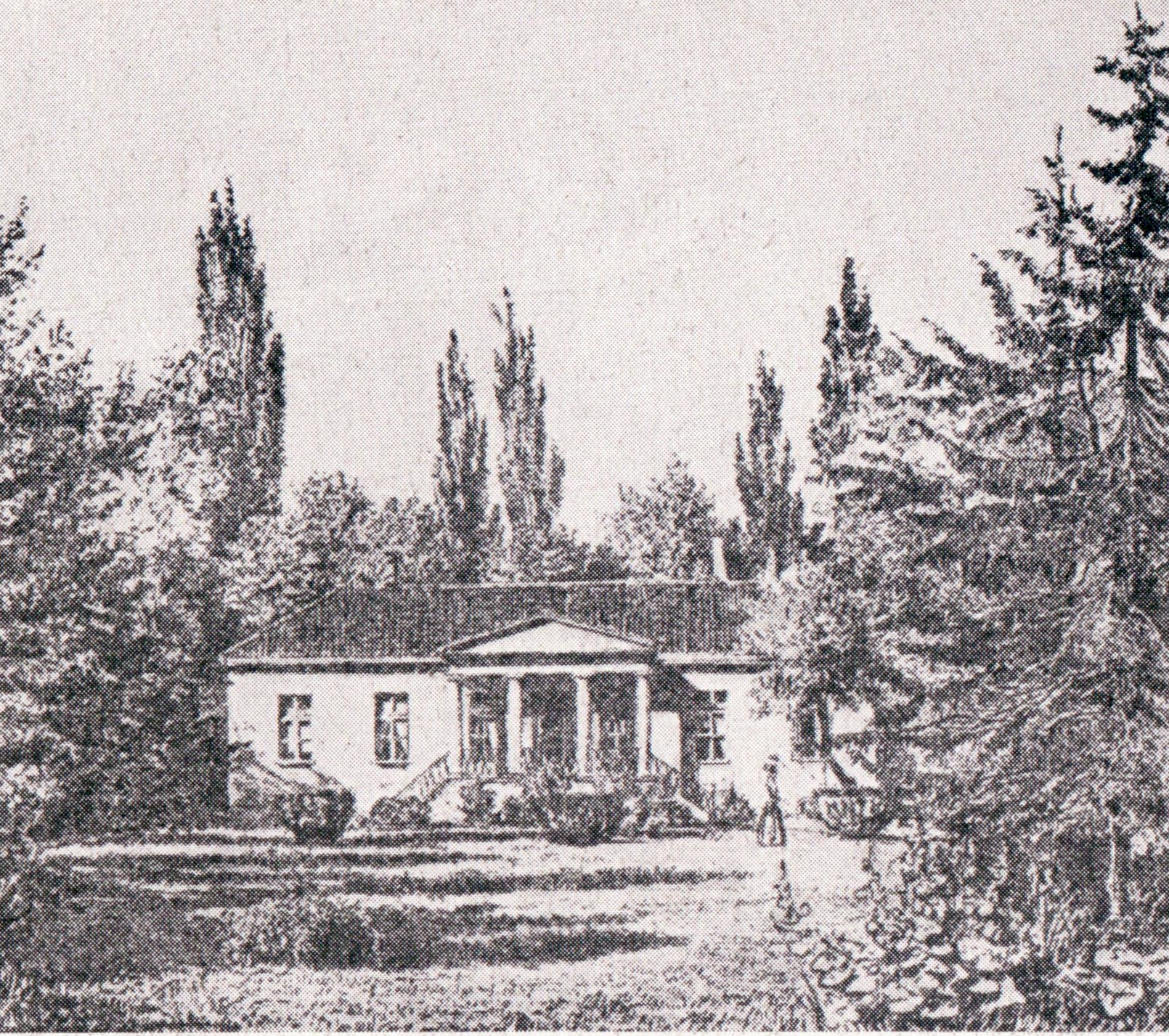
Nos. 18–19: Eybe country house, circa 1850

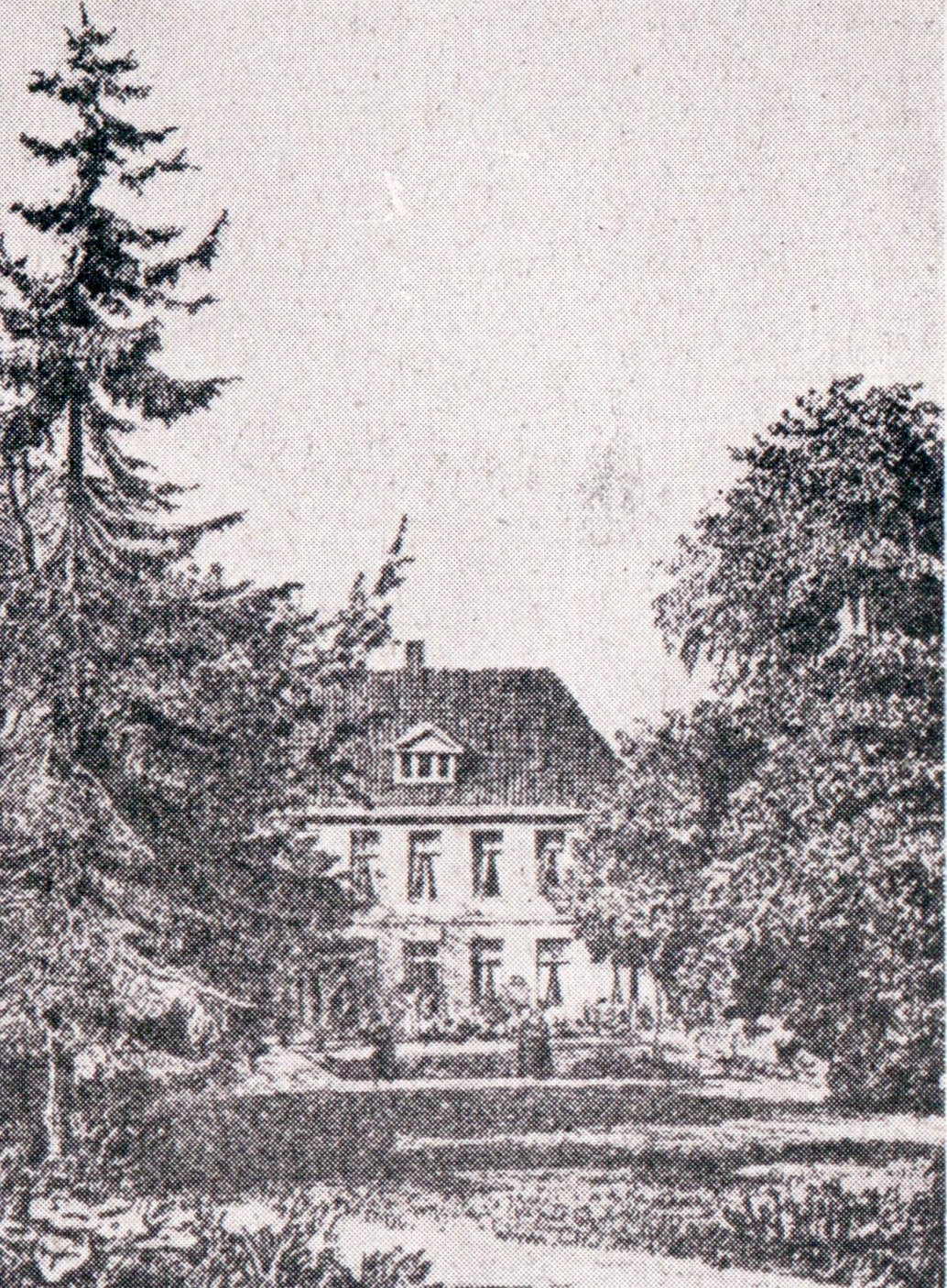
No. 20: Amsinck country house, circa 1850

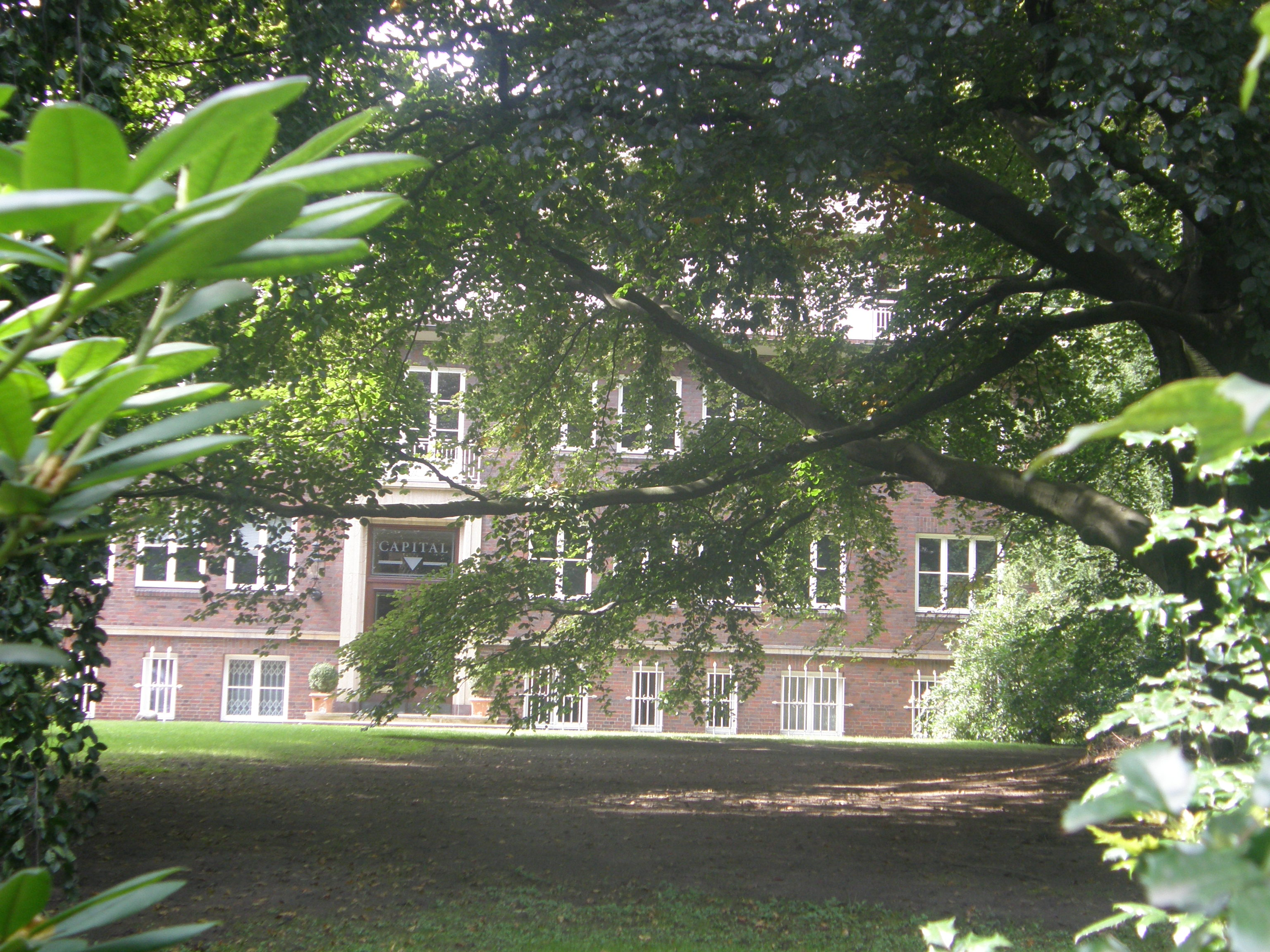
No. 18: Office building, since 1930

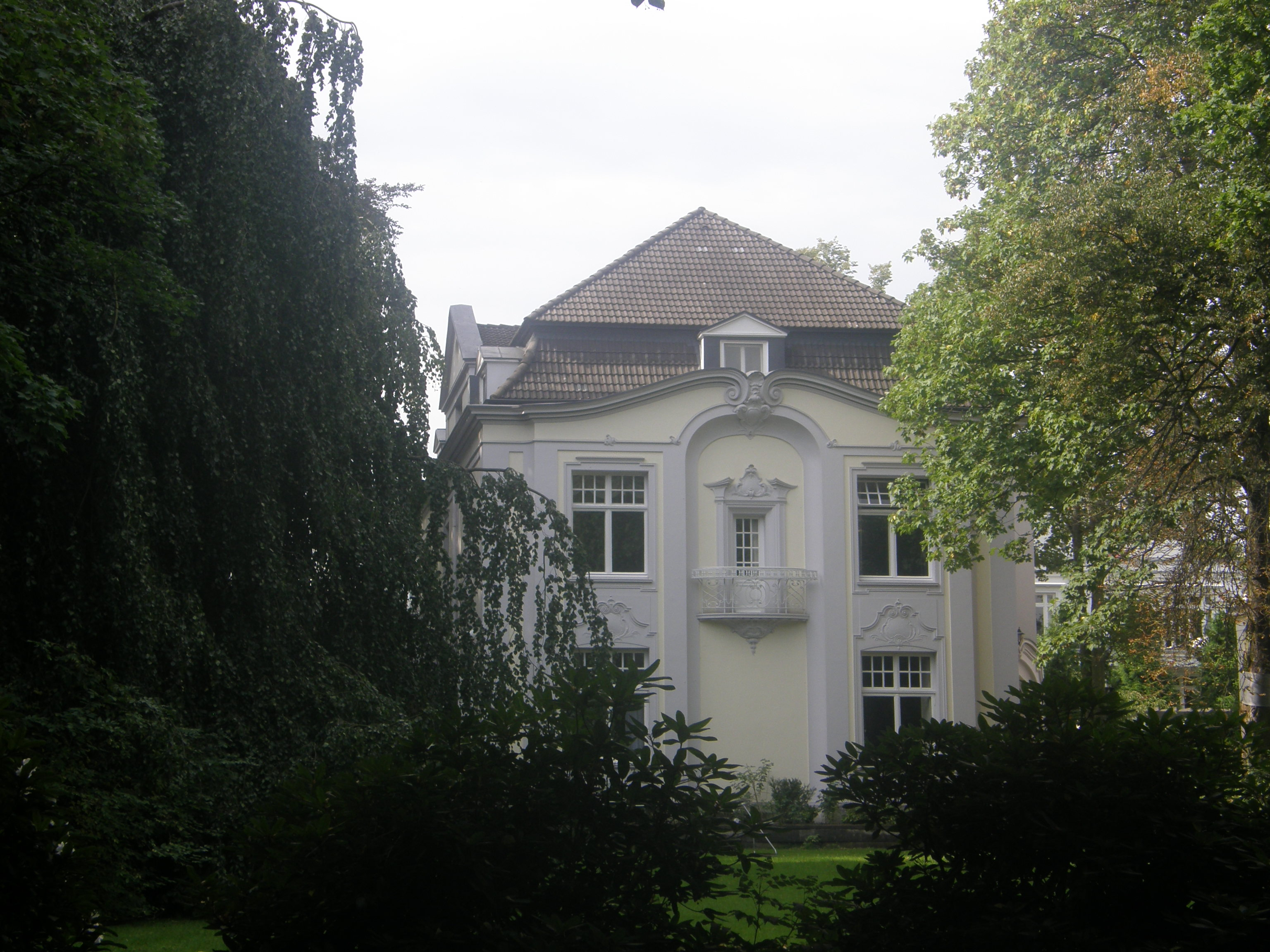
No. 19: Villa Blohm II, since 1925

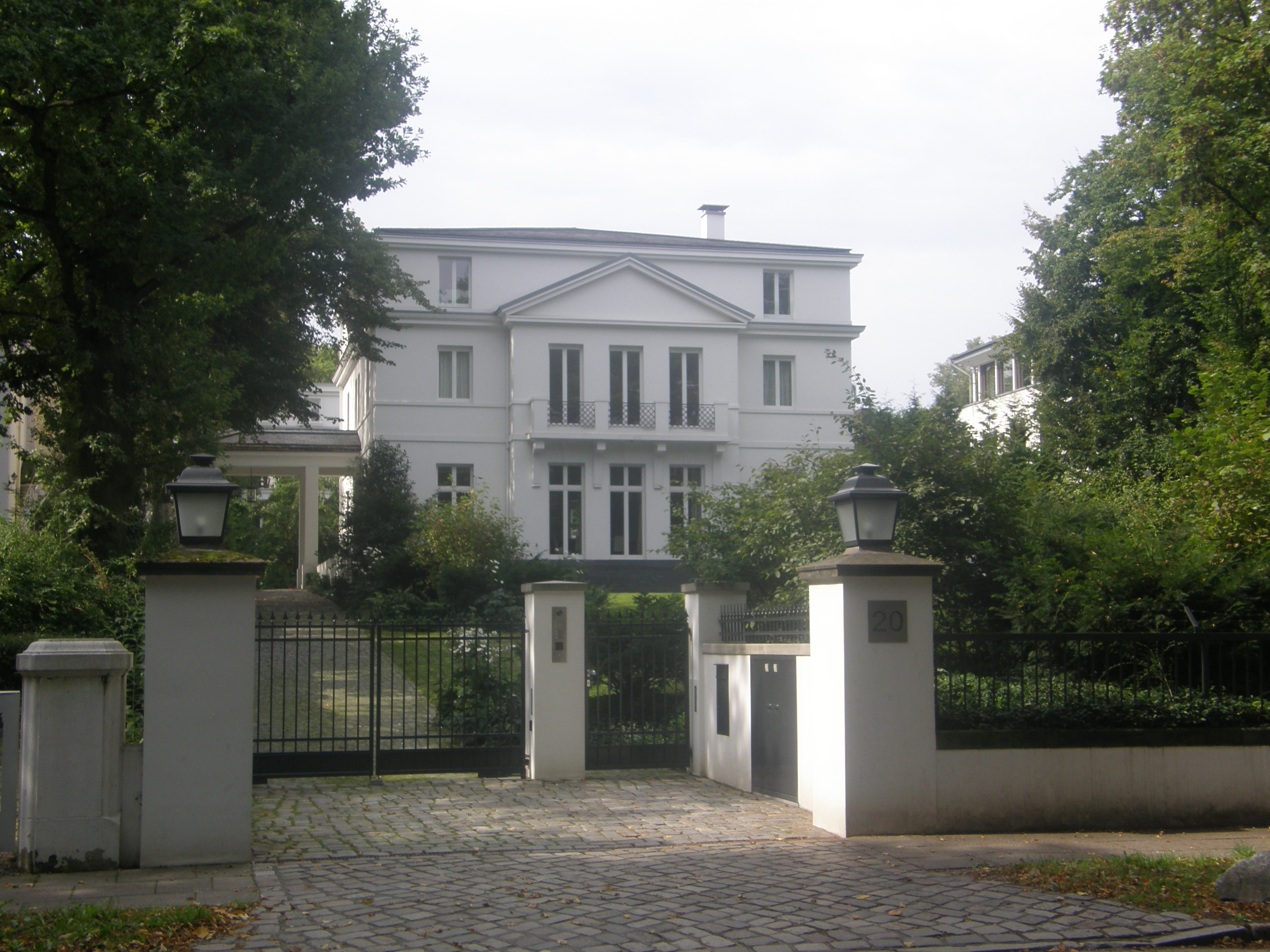
No. 20: French Consulate from 1953 to 2004

=== Sophienterrasse ===
The terrain of the northern Alsterkamp, between Harvestehuder Weg, Mittelweg, and Klosterstieg, was bought in 1818 by builder Christian Diederich Gerhard Schwieger from the St. Johannis monastery foundation. He parcelled the part south of Sophienterrasse and sold the individual plots, today Nos. 27 to 36.

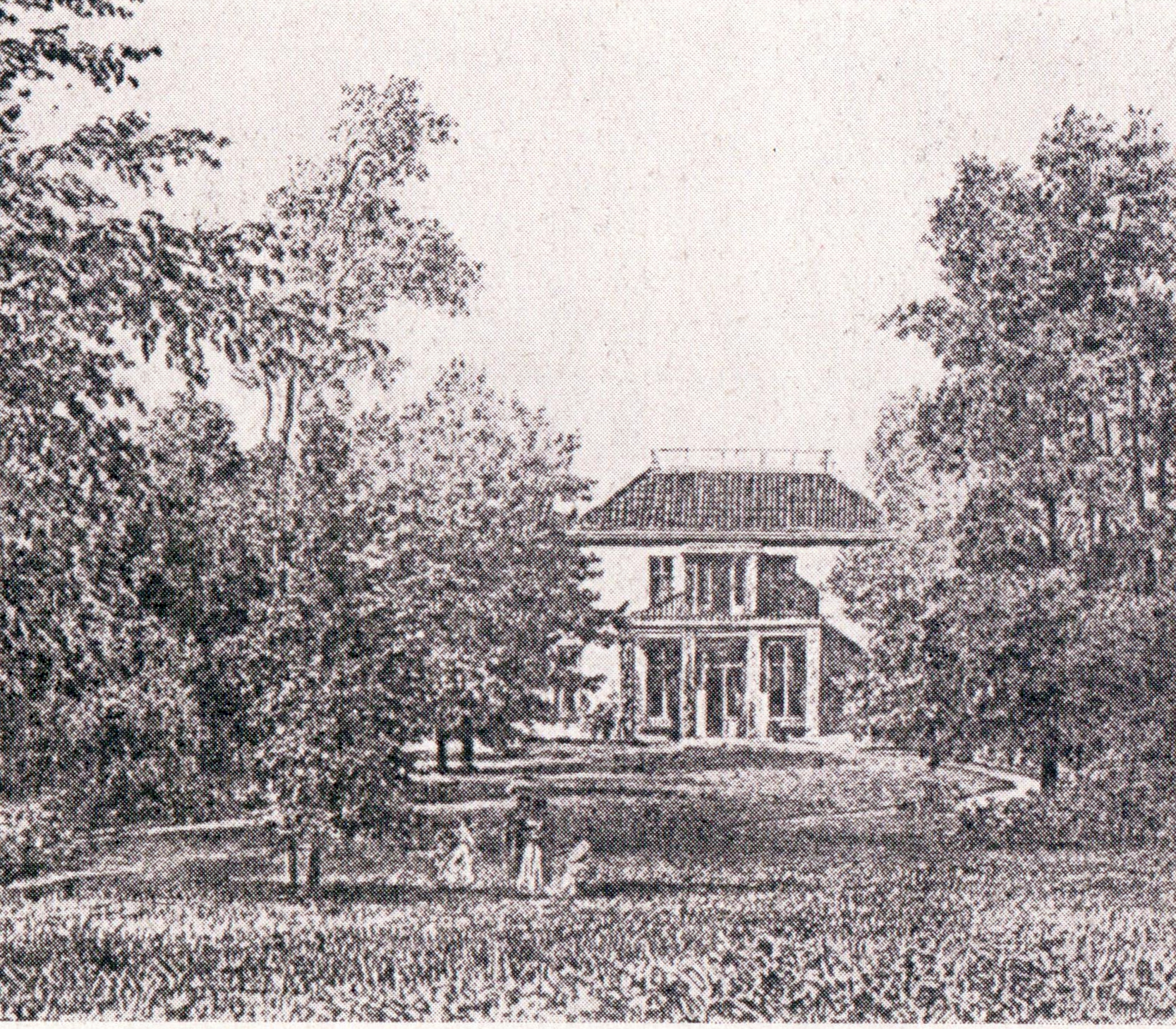
No. 27: Country house of Ami de Chapeaurouge, circa 1850

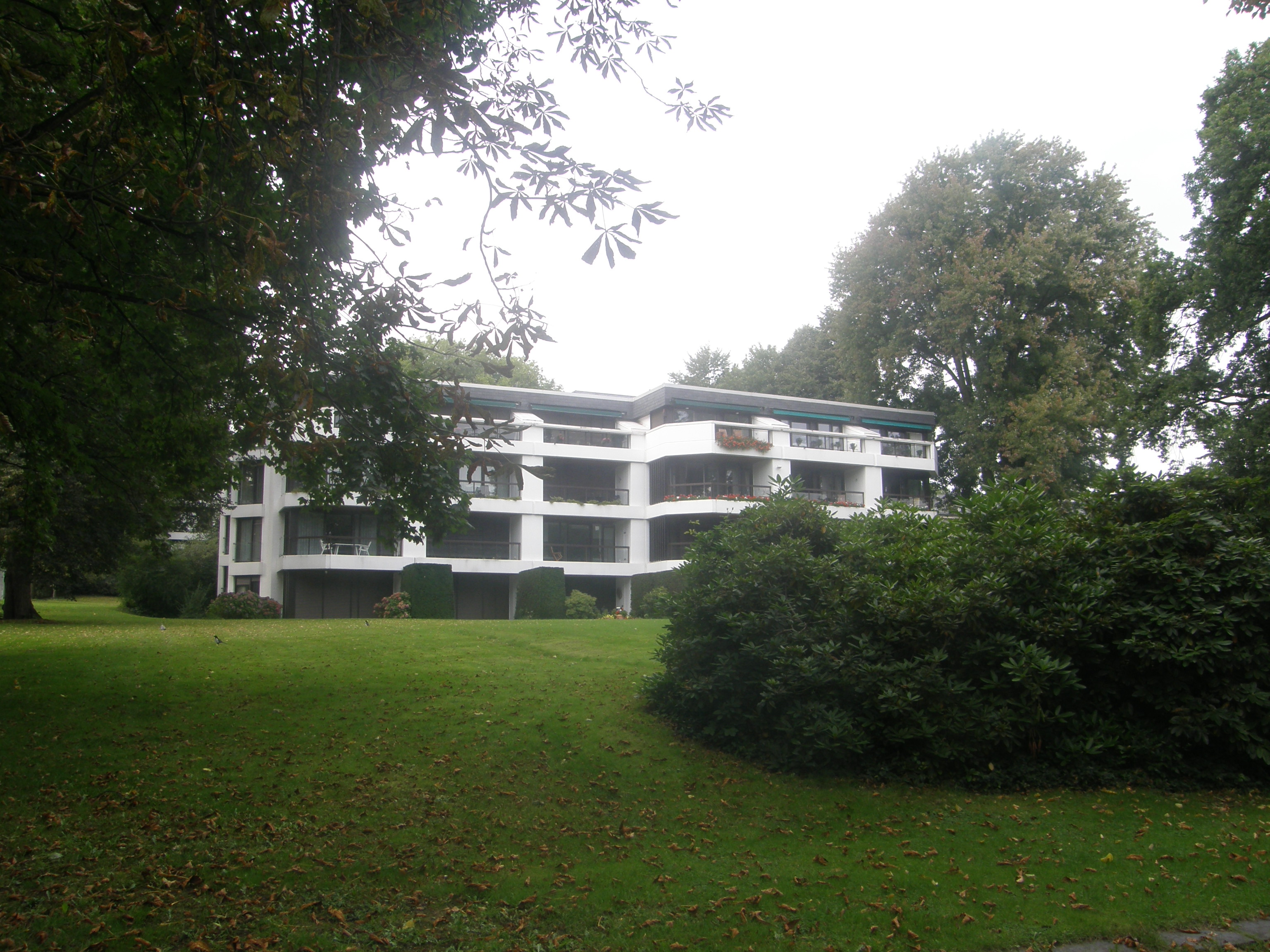
No. 27: Apartment complex, September 2010

Plot No. 27 was bought in 1830 by senator Ami de Chapeaurouge, who commissioned architect Alexis de Chateauneuf with the construction of a country house. In 1894, diamond dealer Alfred Beit (1853–1906) took over the site, had the old house demolished, and a new villa built. After his death, his mother Laura Beit (1824–1918) lived in the house. In 1928, the property was redeveloped again; Jewish commercial councilor Schöndorff had a large house with an impressive oak-paneled staircase built. But he lived there only briefly; after his forced resignation from the supervisory board of Karstadt AG on March 29, 1933, he emigrated. The house was taken over by the Hamburg SA upper group under Herbert Fust. After the war, British secret police moved into the building. In 1966, it was demolished, and the property redeveloped with multi-family houses in apartment style. A prominent resident of one of the apartments was actor Harry Meyen. In 1962, a small street was laid out in the rear part of the property, accessing among others plot No. 28; it was named Alfred-Beit-Straße in memory of the previous owner.

From 1860, merchant and later consul Julius Friedrich Wilhelm Reimers was the owner of plots Nos. 28 to 36, which extended to Mittelweg. For access, he laid out a private road in 1861 and named it Sophienterrasse after his wife Maria Sophie Frederica Reimers (1826–1918). At the later house number 30, he had Villa Sophia, a "palace-like building fortified with battlements," erected.

After 1900, the site was parcelled again; Erich Laeisz bought plot No. 28 and built a villa there from 1915 to 1921, which he called the "house of his dreams." It was destroyed in a 1944 bombing raid, as were the riding hall, carriage houses, and garages in the rear. In 1964, the Wilhelm Gymnasium was built on this site. Christina Mitzlaff-Laeisz, Erich Laeisz's daughter, had a new residence built on her father's property in 1963. Through access via the new road, it received the address Alfred-Beit-Straße 8.

Plot No. 36 was built in 1920 by Otto Blohm (1870–1944), a cousin of Walter and Rudolf Blohm, and his wife Magdalene (1879–1952) with a villa, called Villa Blohm III for distinction. The house was damaged in the war but still habitable. In the 1960s, Allianz Insurance was housed there. In 1965, the house was demolished, and the site redeveloped with apartment houses. In 2009, investment firm Peach Property Group AG took over this property. It plans to demolish the apartments and build five four-story buildings with a total of 63 luxury condominiums.

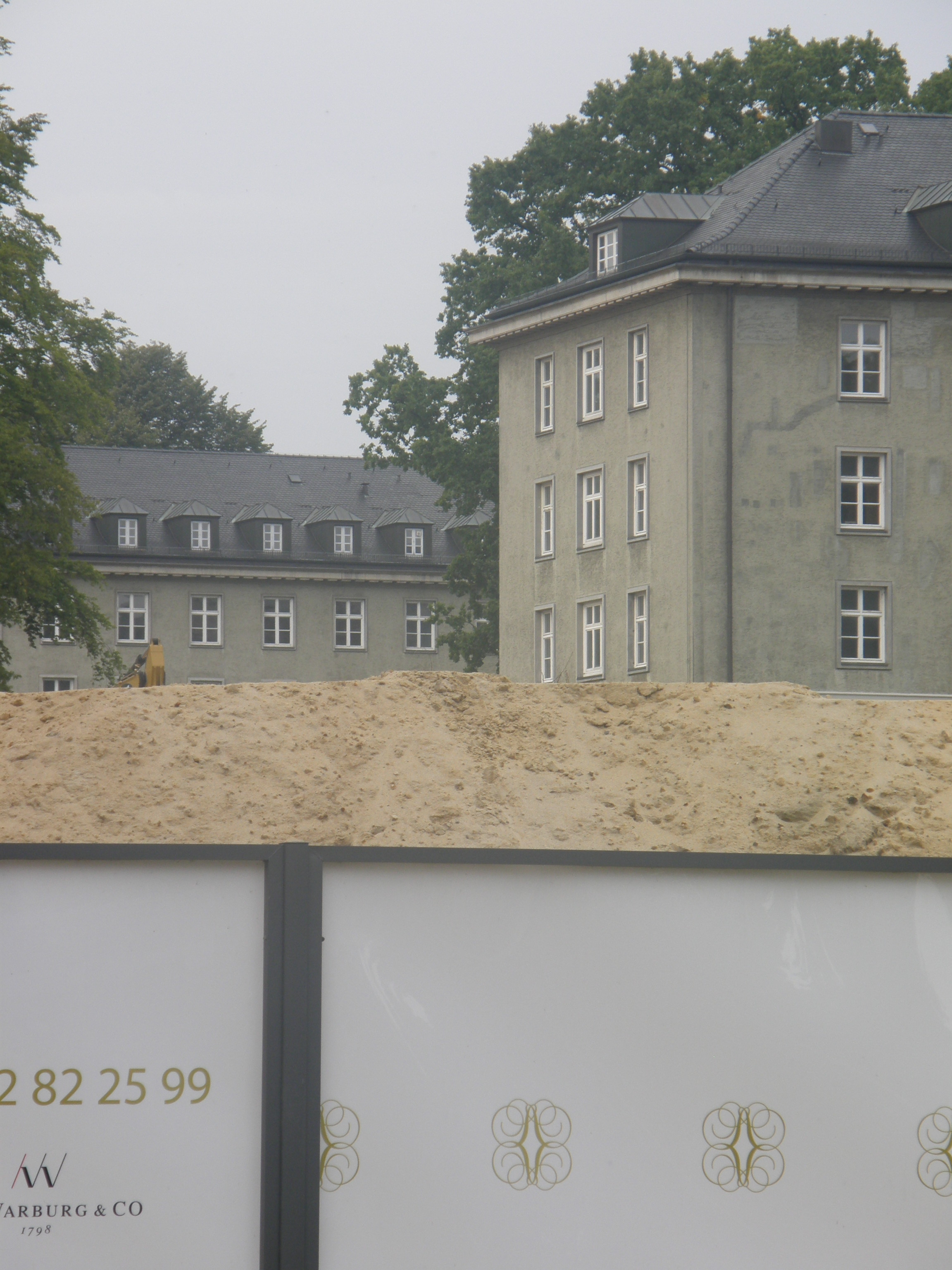
Construction site of Sophienterrasse, wing of the location command

The large central part of the site with Villa Sophia was bought by the German Reich in 1935 and built with a location command and various farm buildings. The general command of Wehrkreis X of the Wehrmacht was housed there. The designs for this extensive building complex with monumental three-wing system and a central risalit ordered by strict pilasters came from architects Distel & Grubitz. Villa Sophia was occupied by the commander of X Army Corps, General Wilhelm Knochenhauer (1878–1939); from 1939 to 1945, Sophienterrasse was called General-Knochenhauer-Straße. After the war, British troops moved into the military site; from 1956 to 2005, the Bundeswehr location command in Hamburg was housed there.

With the departure of the Bundeswehr, the approximately 7.6-hectare property became interesting for urban planning. In 2006, Frankonia Eurobau Investment acquired the area for an estimated purchase price between 35 and 40 million euros. According to the development plan adopted in January 2008 for the Sophienterrassen project in the Eimsbüttel district, incorporating the listed location command, around 200 residential units in townhouses, about 6,000 square meters of office space, and about 420 underground parking spaces are to be created. The master plan for the site between Mittelweg and Harvestehuder Weg comes from Hamburg architect Mirjana Markovic (MRLV Architects). The wing building of the former location command was gutted and is to receive new use with apartments. Parts of the interior design of the complex are to be done by fashion designer Karl Lagerfeld. On Harvestehuder Weg, Frankonia built five more residential houses with several apartments each. With direct reference to the Alster stand at house numbers 29 and 33 two sandstone-clad townhouses by Mirjana Markovic, behind them at house numbers 30 to 32 three neoclassical residential houses by Petra Kahlfeldt and Paul Kahlfeldt, Berlin.

=== Hoffmann und Campe ===
On plots Nos. 41 to 45, the publishing complex of Hoffmann und Campe has been located since the postwar period. It consists of four individual houses of different history and architecture. No. 41 was the former Villa Krogmann, built in 1878 by architect Martin Haller for the Krogmann family. It is an unusual brick building for Alster architecture with a gable crown in Renaissance style. Heir Carl Vincent Krogmann was mayor of Hamburg during National Socialism; he set up the house as Reichsgau propaganda office. The house was requisitioned by the British occupation in 1945 and assigned by the British military authority to Hoffmann und Campe Verlag in place of their war-destroyed old premises in Neuer Wall as publishing building. Next to the building, the bronze Heinrich Heine plaque created by sculptor Caesar Heinemann was attached in 1959. It had been unveiled in 1898 in front of the old publishing house and removed and hidden during National Socialism. It is thus the only original monument to the poet that survived the Nazi era. The former house of mayor Krogmann has since been called Heine-Villa. In 2022, the building was listed.

In the following years, the publisher gradually bought the neighboring houses and properties. No. 43 is a neoclassical white villa built in 1873. From 1935 to 1945, consul and chairman of the Association of Hamburg Ship Brokers Guido Caulier-Eimbcke and his son-in-law, geographer and explorer Otto Schulz-Kampfhenkel, resided there. Building No. 45 is a red brick cube from 1930/1931 with clear Bauhaus reference. It was designed by manage by architect Emil Fahrenkamp for Walter Kruspig, general director of Rhenania-Ossag. On plot No. 42, a new publishing building was erected from 1989 to 1991; architects were Jochem Jourdan and Bernhard Müller. The style is described as eclectic postmodernism, mixing classicist motifs, drawing from the Vienna Secession, and fitting sensitively both between the old villas and into the tree-filled site.

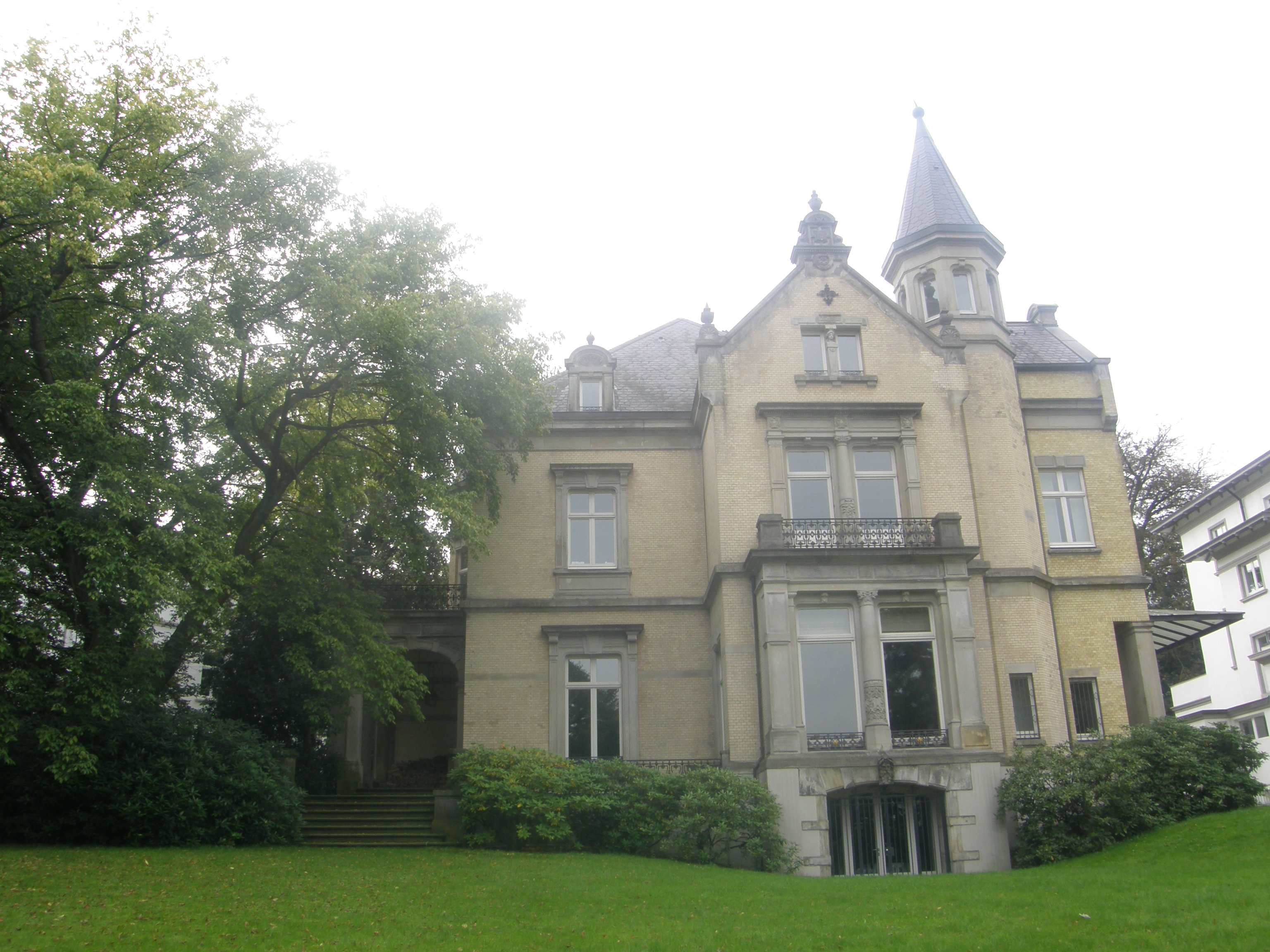
No. 41: Heine-Villa, formerly Krogmann-Villa

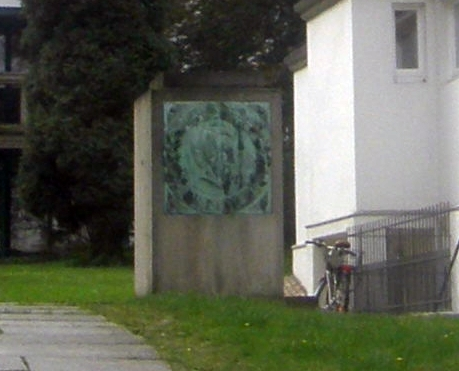
Heine plaque between Nos. 41 and 43

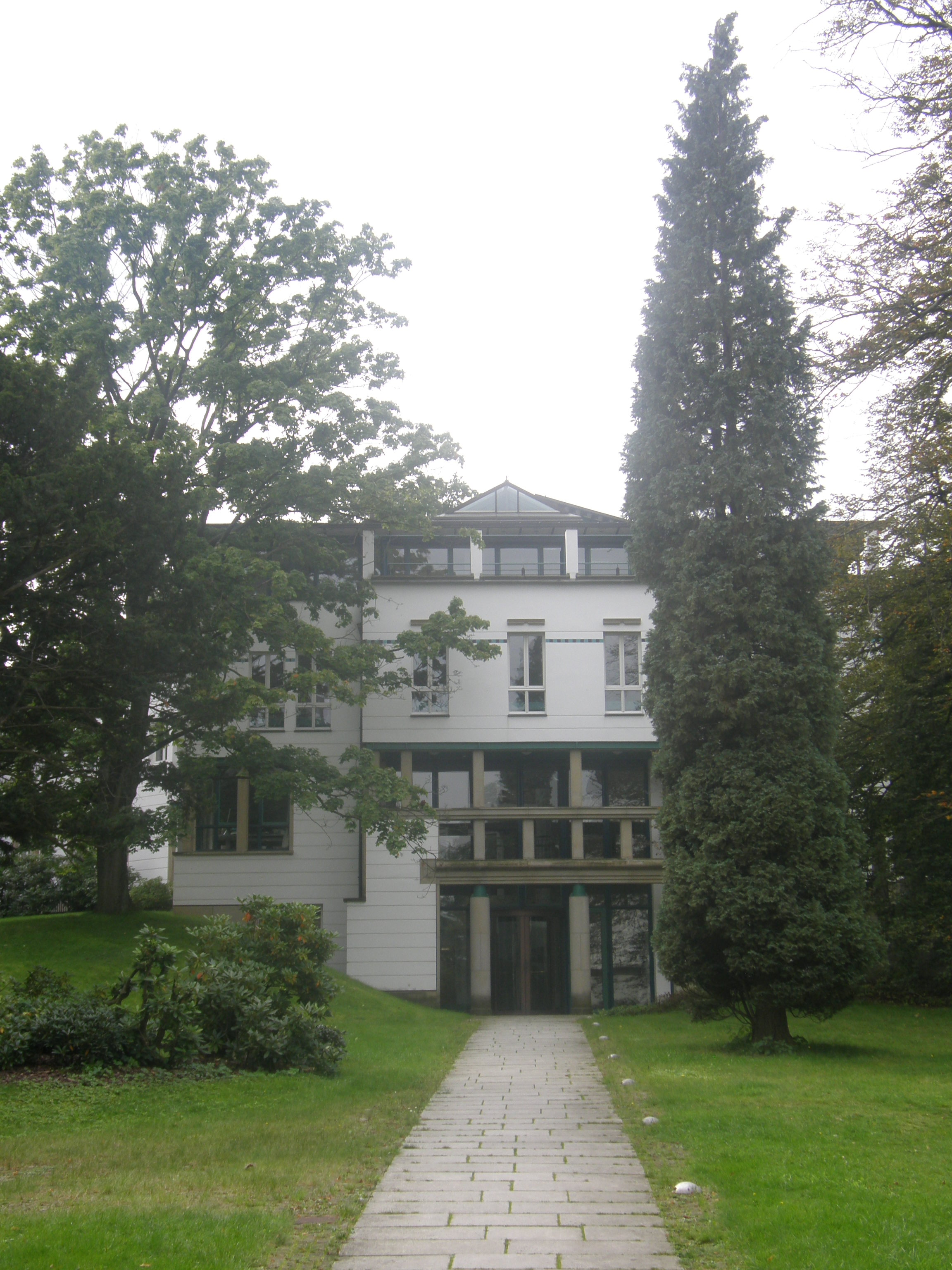
No. 42: Publishing building

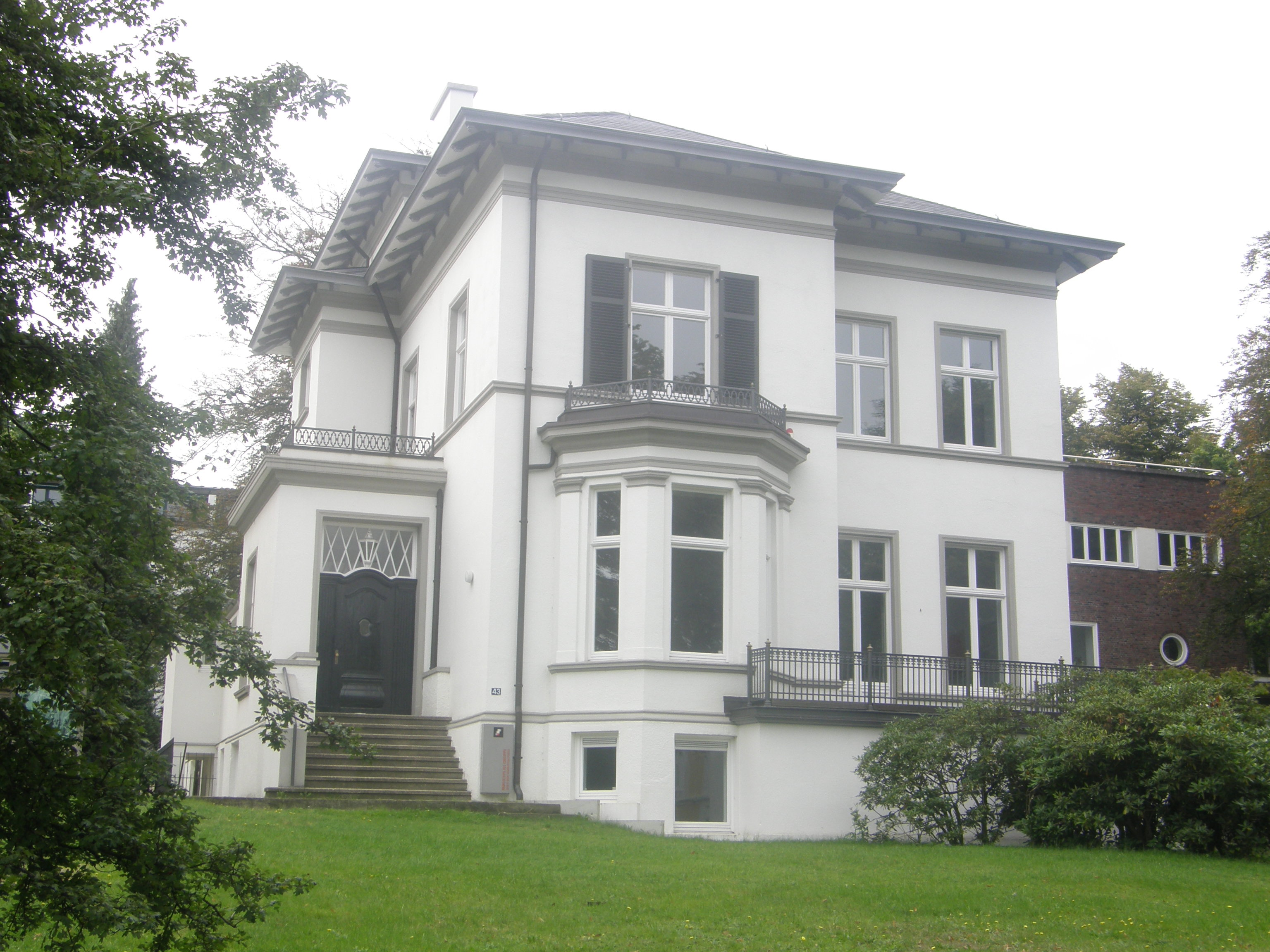
No. 43

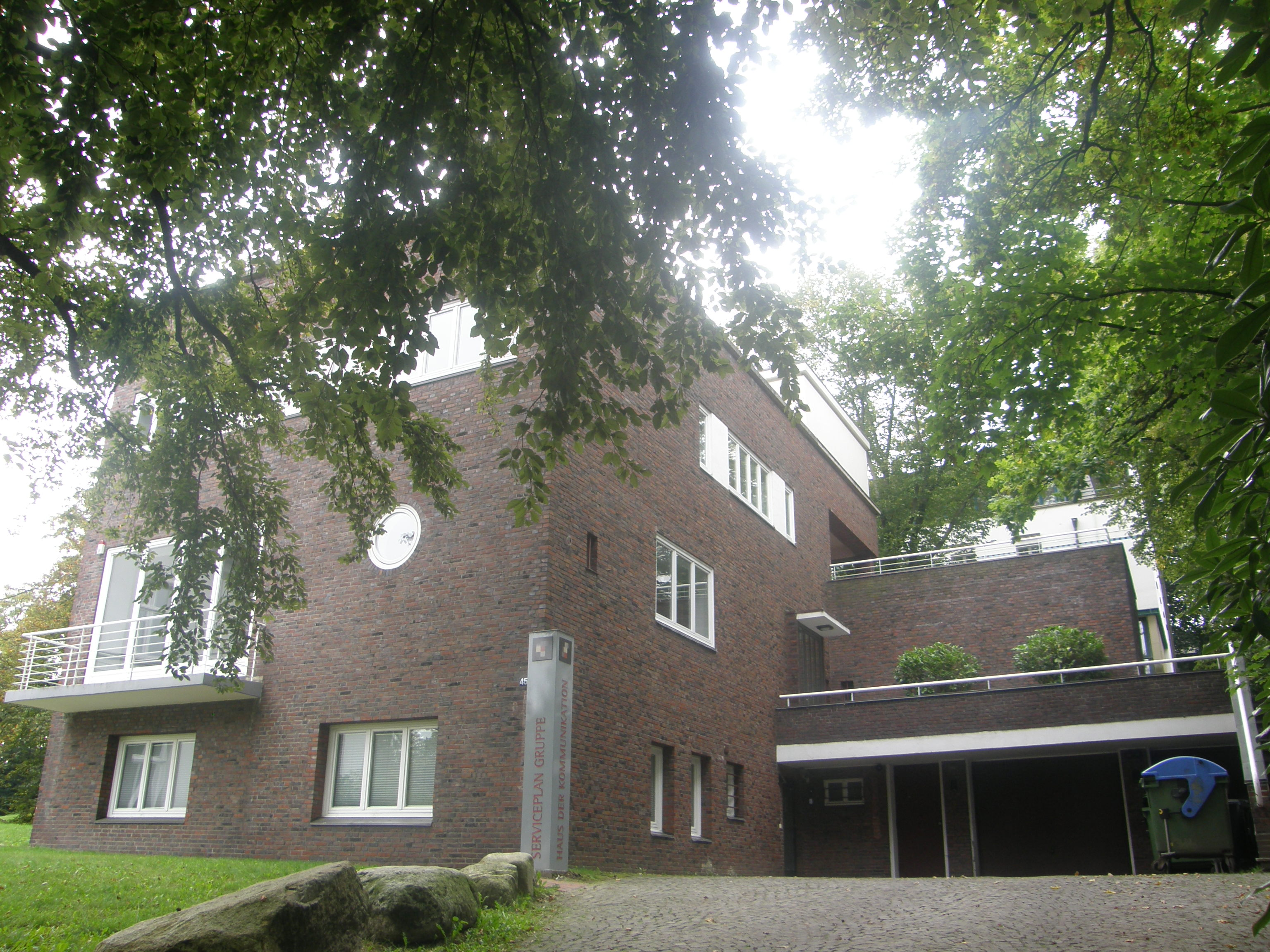
No. 45: Kruspig house

=== Licentiatenberg and Bolivar-Park ===
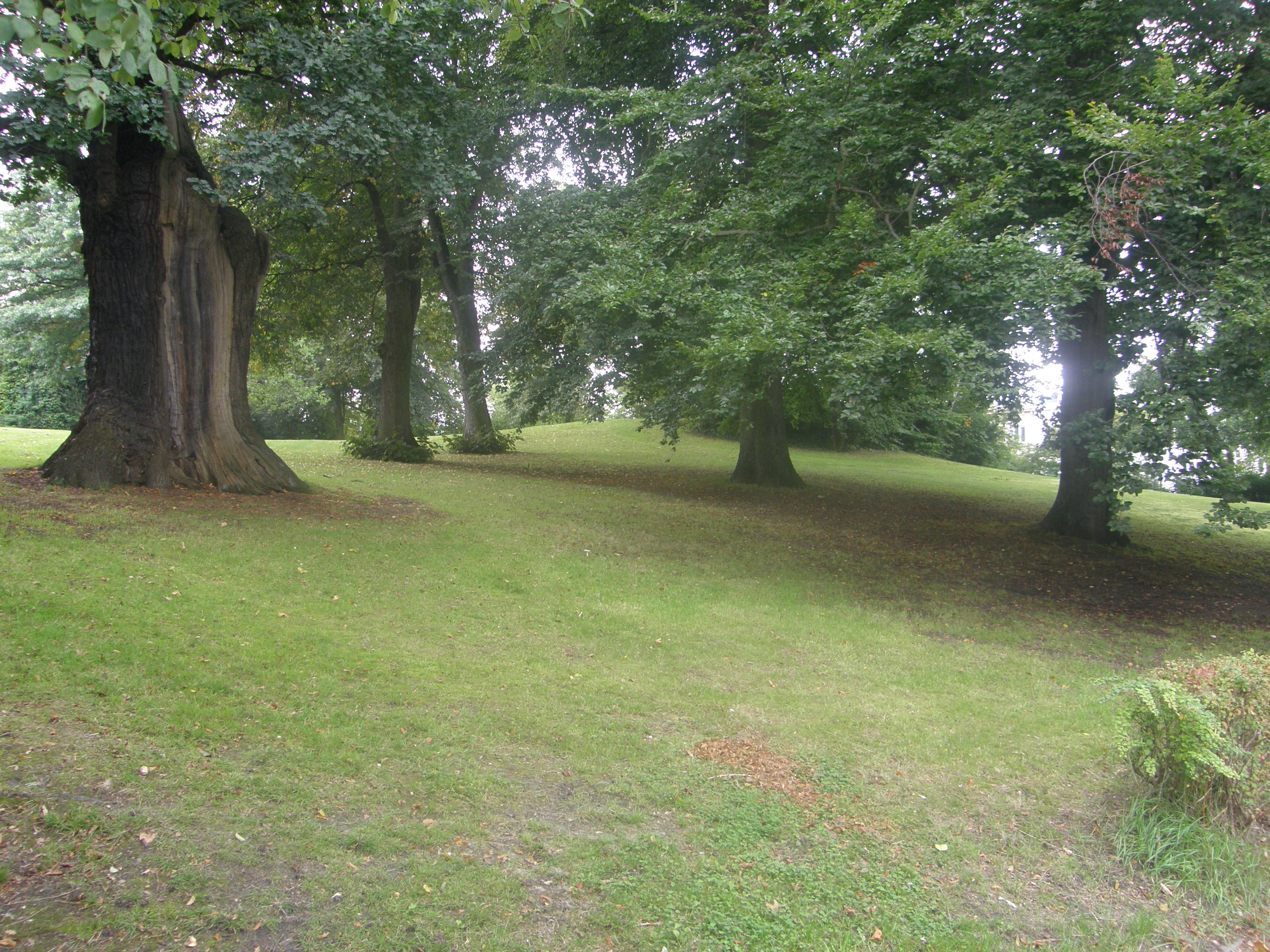
Licentiatenberg

The Licentiatenberg lies opposite the Eichenpark on the left side outbound, before the intersection of Mittelweg with Harvestehuder Weg. It is the visible and undeveloped outlier of the Geest height of the Alsterkamp and is raised by a Bronze Age burial site. This green space also has old tree stock; the oldest oak in Harvestehude, about 450 years old, is located there. It is said to have received its name from an interim lessee of the monastery inn, Bartoldo (Barthold) Huswedel, at the beginning of the 18th century, who was a licentiate of law in Hamburg and president of the lower court. A connection exists with the similarly named tumulus in the Hamburg district of Großborstel insofar as the nuns of the monastery also made excursions there, and the Großborstel hill was called Jungfernberg until the 19th century. Another explanation for the more frequently occurring name is that these places were "provided with permission" to administer justice, corresponding to the meaning of the Latin word licentiate.

The Bolivar-Park is at the end of Harvestehuder Weg between Abteistraße and Klosterstern and extends west to Rothenbaumchaussee. In its markedly rising terrain, the pit where sand and gravel were mined until the 19th century can still be recognized. In snowy winters, it is a designated sledding hill. The terrain structure led to the property being removed from Harvestehude's development plans and laid out as a park around 1900. It was initially called Abteipark after the neighboring street. In 1960, the newly independent Republic of Venezuela donated a monument to the South American independence fighter Simón Bolívar (1783–1830) to the city of Hamburg. The southern exit of Abteipark was chosen as the location, which was renamed Bolivar-Park on this occasion.

=== Artworks along the street ===
Along Harvestehuder Weg, especially in the green spaces but also in the front gardens of the properties, there is a variety of monuments and artworks. Most date from around 1960 and are integrated as public art into the Alsterpark concept. The following list contains the most conspicuous artworks and a former artwork:

Location	Artist	Description	Image
Alte Rabenstraße / Harvestehuder Weg	Franz Andreas Meyer	Street sign with wrought-iron raven figure, listed under cultural monuments No. 18925.	Street sign
House number 1 Alte Rabenstr. 32	Jean Sprenger (1912–1980)	Bronze sculpture from 1955 on the green area in front of the office building corner Alte Rabenstraße, formerly administrative building of Iduna Germania/Signal Iduna; listed under cultural monuments No. 29106. The figure depicts the Germanic youth goddess Idun. It stands in the front garden of Alte Rabenstr. 32 on the side toward Harvestehuder Weg – hidden behind bushes on the left.	Photo
Alstervorland	Gustav Seitz	Bronze sculpture: Die Kniende, 1962	Photo
Alstervorland	Manfred Ritthoff-Lienau	Sculpture graffiti: Das metamorphe Ufer des Herrn Lienau and other welded sheet metal sculptures by the artist on the Alster bank	Photo
Alstervorland	Thomas Stricker	Concrete sculpture: Meteoritenwerkstatt, 2000	Photo
Alstervorland	Ursula Querner	Bronze sculpture: Orpheus und Eurydike, 1958	Photo
Alstervorland	Jörn Pfab	Bronze sculpture: Große Stehende, 1958	Photo
Alstervorland	Gerhard Brandes	Bronze sculpture: Drachensteigen, 1963	Photo
House number 11	Jan Meyer-Rogge	Light metal sculpture: Dreiklang, 1974	Photo
House number 39	John Seward Johnson II	Sculpture: One man's search and other works by Johnson in the villa's front garden	Photo
House number 41	Caesar Heinemann	Bronze plaque: Heinrich Heine, 1898, monument, listed under cultural monuments No. 19578.	Photo
Eichenpark	unknown	Bronze relief: Friedrich Hagedorn, 1897, memorial plaque embedded in a boulder, listed under cultural monuments No. 19589.	Photo
Eichenpark	Friedrich Wield	Bronze sculpture: Ätherwellen, 1933; monument to Heinrich Hertz – This sculpture has stood since 2016 in front of the NDR studio on Rothenbaumchaussee	Photo
House number 107	Hugo Lederer	Sculpture: Das Schicksal, 1905; This sculpture stood until 1956 at this location, in its own small pavilion in the garden of the former Villa Lippert; the house was demolished, the figure housed on Ohlsdorf Cemetery near chapel 7.	Photo
Bolivar-Park	L. Frizzi	Bronze sculpture: Simon Bolivar, 1960; monument, gift from the Republic of Venezuela to the city of Hamburg, listed under cultural monuments No. 19550.	Photo

== Bibliography ==
- Michael Ahrens: Das britische Generalkonsulat am Harvestehuder Weg. Hamburg 2003, OCLC 249041882.
- Christian Hanke, Reinhard Hentschel: Harvestehude – Rotherbaum im Wandel. Hamburg 1993, ISBN 3-929229-09-9.
- Arno Herzig (ed.): Die Juden in Hamburg von 1590 bis 1990. Wissenschaftliche Beiträge der Universität Hamburg zur Ausstellung Vierhundert Jahre Juden in Hamburg. Hamburg 1991, ISBN 3-926174-25-0.
- Hermann Hipp: Harvestehude – Rotherbaum. Arbeitshefte zur Denkmalpflege in Hamburg Nr. 3. Hans Christians Verlag, Hamburg 1976, ISBN 3-7672-0425-8.
- Felix Rexhausen: In Harvestehude. Aufzeichnungen eines Hamburger Stadtteilschreibers. Hamburg 1979, ISBN 3-920610-26-1.
- Wilhelm Schwarz: But’n Dammdoor. Aus der Vergangenheit des hamburgischen Stadtteiles Harvestehude-Rotherbaum. Hamburg circa 1930.
- Silke Urbanski: Geschichte des Klosters Harvestehude „In valle virginum“. Wirtschaftliche, soziale und politische Entwicklung eines Nonnenklosters bei Hamburg 1245–1530. (Dissertation). Münster 1996, ISBN 3-8258-2758-5.
- Eberhard von Wiese: Hier ist das Paradies. Schicksale am Harvestehuder Weg. In: Eberhard von Wiese: Hamburg. Menschen – Schicksale. Frankfurt 1967.
- Jonas Ludwig von Heß: Hamburg topographisch, politisch und historisch beschrieben, Volume 3, Verlag (der Verfasser), 1811, Die alte Rabe und Harvestehude from p. 55 Full text at Internet Archive.
