= List of Canadian films of the 1940s =

This is a list of Canadian films that were released in the 1940s.

Title	Director	Cast	Genre	Notes
1941
Churchill's Island	Stuart Legg	Narrated by Lorne Greene	National Film Board of Canada (NFB) short	Academy Award for Documentary Short Subject
Inside Fighting China	Stuart Legg	Narrated by Lorne Greene	NFB short	Academy Award for Best Documentary (Short Subject) nominee
Mail Early	Norman McLaren		NFB animated short	Norman McLaren's first film for the NFB
Warclouds in the Pacific	Stuart Legg	Narrated by Lorne Greene	NFB short	Academy Award for Best Documentary (Short Subject) nominee
1942
High over the Borders	Raymond Spottiswoode		NFB short	Academy Award for Best Documentary nominee
1943
Alexis Tremblay, Habitant	Jane Marsh Beveridge		NFB documentary	Photographed by Judith Crawley
At the Crossroads (À la croisée des chemins)	Jean-Marie Poitevin & Paul Guèvremont	Paul Guèvremont, Denise Pelletier	Drama	Narrated by René Lévesque, the future premier of Quebec.
1945
Fridolinons	Roger Blais	Gratien Gélinas	Short	
The Music Master (Le Père Chopin)	Fedor Ozep & Georges Freedland	Madeleine Ozeray, Marcel Chabrier, Pierre Durand	Drama	The first of several feature films produced during the 1940s and early 1950s by Renaissance Films of Montreal.
1946
Listen to the Prairies (Le chant des prairies)	Gudrun Parker	Narrated by Budd Knapp	NFB documentary short	Presented at the 1946 Cannes Film Festival under the title A City Sings
1947
Bush Pilot	Sterling Campbell	Rochelle Hudson, Jack La Rue, Austin Willis, Frank Perry	Melodrama	
Whispering City and La Forteresse	Fedor Ozep	English cast: Helmut Dantine, Mary Anderson, Paul Lukas, John Pratt; French cast: Paul Dupuis, Nicole Germain, Jacques Auger, Henri Letondal	Crime drama	Two films made simultaneously with each other, with different casts acting English and French versions of the same screenplay.
1948
Drug Addict	Robert Anderson		NFB short	Canadian Film Awards (CFA) - Documentary
The Loon's Necklace	Budge Crawley		Short	The film won the inaugural Canadian Film Award for Film of the Year; AV Preservation Trust Masterwork
Sins of the Fathers	Phil Rosen	Austin Willis, Joy Lafleur	Drama	
Who Will Teach Your Child?	Stanley Jackson		NFB documentary	
1949
Begone Dull Care	Norman McLaren, Evelyn Lambart	Visual music presentation of Oscar Peterson	NFB animated short	At the 1st Berlin International Film Festival it won the Silver Medal (Culture Films and Documentaries) award; AV Preservation Trust Masterwork
The Grand Bill (Le Gros Bill)	Jean-Yves Bigras, René Delacroix	Ginette Letondal, Juliette Béliveau	Comedy/drama	
A Man and His Sin (Un Homme et son péché)	Paul Gury	Hector Charland, Nicole Germain, Guy Provost	Drama	Canadian Film Award - Special Award
Perpetual Movement (Mouvement perpétuel)	Claude Jutra			Canadian Film Award winner for Best Amateur Film in 1950
The Rising Tide	Jean Palardy		NFB documentary	It was nominated for an Academy Award for Best Documentary (Short Subject)
The Story of Dr. Louise (On ne triche pas la vie)	Paul Vandenberghe, René Delacroix	Madeleine Robinson, Jean Davy, Line Noro	Drama	First Canada-France co-production
The Village Priest (Le Curé du village)	Richard Jarvis	Ovila Légaré, Lise Roy, Denis Drouin	Drama	
