= List of Canadian films of the 1950s =

This is a list of Canadian films that were released in the 1950s.

Title	Director	Cast	Genre	Notes
1950
Forbidden Journey	Richard J. Jarvis	Jan Rubeš, Susan Douglas, John Colicos	Drama	
Fugitive from Montreal (L'inconnu de Montréal)	Jean Devaivre	René Dary, Patricia Roc, Paul Dupuis, Albert Miller	Drama	
Lights of My City (Les Lumières de ma ville)	Jean-Yves Bigras	Huguette Oligny, Monique Leyrac	Drama	
Séraphin	Paul Gury	Hector Charland, Nicole Germain, Guy Provost	Drama	
1951
Around Is Around & Now Is the Time	Norman McLaren		NFB experimental shorts	An early experimentation in 3D by Norman McLaren and Evelyn Lambart; CFA - Special award
The Fight: Science Against Cancer	Morten Parker		NFB animated short	Academy Award for Best Documentary (Short Subject); Canadian Film Award - Special Award
Neighbours	Norman McLaren	Grant Munro, Jean Paul Ladouceur	NFB short made by pixilation technique	Academy Award Short Subject (One-reel) nominee and Best Documentary (Short Subject) winner; AV Preservation Trust Masterwork
Newfoundland Scene	F. R. Crawley	Frank Peddie	Documentary	
Royal Journey	David Bairstow, Gudrun Parker, Roger Blais		NFB documentary	
1952
The Bird Fancier (L'Homme aux oiseaux)	Bernard Devlin, Jean Palardy		Drama	
The Immortal Scoundrel (Étienne Brûlé, gibier de potence)	Melburn Turner	Paul Dupuis, Jacques Auger, Ginette Letondal	Drama	The film was shot in both French and English, and is credited as being the first Canadian feature in colour.
Little Aurore's Tragedy (La petite Aurore, l’enfant martyre)	Jean-Yves Bigras	Yvonne Laflamme, Lucie Mitchell	Drama	
The Nightingale and the Bells (Le Rossignol et les cloches)	René Delacroix	Gérard Barbeau, Nicole Germain, Jean Coutu, Juliette Béliveau	Drama	
Opera School	Gudrun Parker	Marguerite Gignac	Docudrama	
The Romance of Transportation in Canada	Colin Low		NFB animated short	The received a special BAFTA Award, the Short Film Palme d'Or for animation at Cannes Film Festival, as well as an Academy Award for Animated Short Film nomination.
The Settler (L'Abatis)	Bernard Devlin, Raymond Garceau		Short documentary	
1953
Farewell Oak Street	Grant McLean	Kate Reid, Eric Clavering	Docudrama	Canadian Film Award – Theatrical Short
Herring Hunt	Julian Biggs		NFB short	Academy Award nominee
A Mother's Heart (Cœur de maman)	René Delacroix	Jeanne Demons, Paul Desmarteaux, Jean-Paul Dugas, Paul Guèvremont	Drama	
Tit-Coq	René Delacroix & Gratien Gélinas	Gratien Gélinas, Clément Latour, Monique Miller, Denise Pelletier, Paul Dupuis	Drama based on the play by Gélinas	
1954
Corral	Colin Low		NFB short	
The Seasons	Christopher Chapman		Short documentary	
The Stratford Adventure	Morten Parker	Narrated by John Drainie	NFB documentary	This was named Film of the Year at the Canadian Film Awards and nominated for an Academy Award for Best Documentary Feature
1955
Blinkity Blank	Norman McLaren		NFB animated short	It received the Short Film Palme d'Or at the 1955 Cannes Film Festival
Le Village enchanté	Marcel Racicot & Réal Racicot		Animated	Canada's first animated feature.
1956
Gold	Colin Low		Documentary short	
Rythmetic	Norman McLaren & Evelyn Lambart		NFB animated short	
Skidrow	Allan King		CBC documentary	Canadian Film Awards – TV Information
1957
A Chairy Tale	Norman McLaren & Claude Jutra	Claude Jutra	NFB short Pixilation	Nominated for an Academy Award for Best Short Subject (Live Action)
City of Gold	Colin Low & Wolf Koenig		Klondike Gold Rush; Documentary	Winner of the Palme d'or for best short film at the 1957 Cannes Film Festival and nominated for an Academy Award Best Short Subject, Live Action Subjects
Legend of the Raven	Judith Crawley		Documentary	Canadian Film Awards – Arts and Experimental
Oedipus Rex	Tyrone Guthrie	Douglas Campbell, Eleanor Stuart, William Hutt, Douglas Rain		Classic drama from the original Stratford Festival stage version based on a translation by W. B. Yeats
1958
Les brûlés	Bernard Devlin	Jean Lajeunesse, J. Léo Gagnon, Félix Leclerc	Drama	
A Dangerous Age	Sidney J. Furie	Ben Piazza, Anne Pearson, Kate Reid, Austin Willis, Barbara Hamilton	Drama	
Flaming Frontier	Sam Newfield	Bruce Bennett, Jim Davis, Cec Linder, Larry Solway	Western	A low-budget B-Western shot in Los Angeles and Calgary and made with Canadian financing.
Ivy League Killers	William Davidson	Don Borisenko, Don Francks, Barbara Bricker	Drama	
The Living Stone	John Feeney		NFB documentary	Nominated for an Academy Award for Best Documentary Short.
Money Minters	Ted De Wit		Documentary	
Now That April's Here	William Davidson, Norman Klenman	Don Borisenko, Judy Welch, John Drainie, Katherine Blake, Tony Grey, Walter Massey	Drama	
The Quest	Stanley Jackson	Leo Ciceri, Dennis Stanway, Norman Ettlinger	Short drama	
The Snowshoers (Les Raquetteurs)	Michel Brault, Gilles Groulx		NFB documentary	
The Tall Country	Osmond Borradaile		Documentary	
Wolf Dog	Sam Newfield	Ben Piazza, Austin Willis	Drama	
1959
The Back-Breaking Leaf	Terence Macartney-Filgate		NFB documentary	Part of the groundbreaking NFB Candid Eye series shown on the CBC-TV (1958–61); Cannes Film Festival – Palme d'Or for Television Documentary
The Bloody Brood	Julian Roffman	Jack Betts, Barbara Lord, Peter Falk, Robert Christie	Drama	
A Cool Sound from Hell	Sidney J. Furie	Anthony Ray, Carolyn D'Annibale, Madeline Kronby	Drama	
Glenn Gould: On/Off the Record	Wolf Koenig, Roman Kroitor		NFB documentary	Part of the Candid Eye series
