= Cinema of Quebec =

- No. of screens: 714 (2022)

Number of admissions (2022)
- Total: 11,326,518
- National films: 995,072 (8.8%)

Gross box office (2022)
- Total: $108.5 million

The history of cinema in Quebec started on June 27, 1896, when the Frenchman Louis Minier inaugurated the first movie projection in North America in a Montreal theatre room. However, it would have to wait until the 1960s before a genuine Quebec cinema industry would emerge. Approximately 620 feature-length films have been produced, or partially produced by the Quebec film industry since 1943.

Due to language and cultural differences between the predominantly francophone population of Quebec and the predominantly anglophone population of the rest of Canada, Quebec's film industry is commonly regarded as a distinct entity from its English Canadian counterpart. In addition to participating in Canada's national Genie Awards, the Quebec film industry also maintains its own awards ceremony, the Prix Iris (formerly known as Jutra). In addition, the popularity of homegrown French language films among Quebec audiences, as opposed to English Canadians' preference for Hollywood films, means that Quebec films are often more successful at the box office than English Canadian films — in fact, the top-grossing Canadian film of the year is often a French language film from Quebec.

== History ==
=== Before the Office national du film ===
From 1896 to the 1960s, the Catholic clergy tried to control what movies Quebecers could see. Two methods were employed: censorship and prohibition of attendance by children under 16. In 1913, the Bureau de censure de vues animées (Office of censorship for motion pictures) began regulating the projection of movies in Quebec. In 1927, the Laurier-Palace Theatre burned down, killing 78 children. The church then almost succeeded at closing down all projection rooms in the province. However, the Parliament of Quebec passed a law preventing only children under 16 from attending movie projections. This law would be repealed only in 1961.

Nevertheless, some films were produced in Quebec during this period. Those were mostly documentaries, some of which were made by priests (Albert Tessier) and civil servants (Herménégilde Lavoie). Joseph-Arthur Homier is considered the first director of feature-length films in Quebec, and his 1922 production, Madeleine de Verchères, was based on the life of the 17th-century Quebec heroine, Madeleine de Verchères. In the 1940s and 1950s, the first commercial attempts at cinema happened. Two production houses were at the origins of all the movies of this period: Renaissance Films and Québec Productions. Most of the commercial feature films came primarily from four directors: Fyodor Otsep, Paul Gury, Jean-Yves Bigras, and René Delacroix. Notable films of this period include The Music Master (Le Père Chopin, 1945), A Man and His Sin (Un homme et son péché, 1949), The Nightingale and the Bells (Le Rossignol et les cloches, 1952), Little Aurore's Tragedy (La petite Aurore l'enfant martyre, 1952), Tit-Coq (1953), and The Promised Land (Les brûlés, 1959).

=== After the Office national du film ===
The National Film Board of Canada was established by the Parliament of Canada in 1939. Its office moved from Ottawa to Montreal in 1956. In 1957, the new commissioner, Albert Trueman, recommended the creation of a separately funded French production wing. Minister J. W. Pickersgill rejected Trueman's recommendation as Ottawa feared that two separate organizations would develop under the same roof. This decision intensified the campaign of the Quebec French language press for an autonomous French language branch. Guy Roberge was appointed as the NFB's first francophone Commissioner in April 1957. The French branch of the National Film Board of Canada was established and the NFB became autonomous in 1959.

Direct Cinema filmmakers Michel Brault, Pierre Perrault and Gilles Groulx all made their debut at the NFB. That decade also saw the beginnings of directors Claude Jutra, Gilles Carle and Denys Arcand.

=== The 1960s and 1970s ===
Two key changes in the late 1960s paved the way for a new era in Québécois cinema. First, in 1967, Quebec's (religious) censorship bureau was replaced by a film ratings system administered by the province. The other phenomenon was the introduction, in 1967, by the federal government, of its Canadian Film Development Corporation (CFDC, to become Telefilm Canada). This allowed a greater number of films to reach the screen through government subsidy.

Commercial directors such as Denis Héroux or Claude Fournier became known for their films Valérie (Héroux) and Deux femmes en or (Fournier), two comedies with erotic overtones showing popular success not seen in Quebec since Jean-Yves Bigras' La Petite Aurore l'enfant martyre (1952).

The seventies also marked a high in national filmmaking seen from an artistic perspective, an assessment supported by opinion polls such as the TIFF List of Canada's Top 10 Films of All Time, which has included several films from that decade every year that the poll was taken. Arcand and Carle had critical (especially at Cannes) and some commercial success with films such as Gina (Arcand) and La vraie nature de Bernadette (Carle). In 1971, director Claude Jutra released one of the most critically praised Quebec film to date, Mon oncle Antoine. However, his next movie, an adaptation of Anne Hébert's Kamouraska, was a commercial and critical failure. It should be mentioned that this film suffered re-editing done to accommodate theater owners. A two-hour-long restored version, seen in 2003, shows more artistic coherence. In 1977, Jean Beaudin's J.A. Martin Photographe was selected at Cannes where Monique Mercure, the female star of the film, won Best Actress (tying with Shelley Duvall for 3 Women).

In 1971, a group of filmmakers in Montreal established the Association coopérative de productions audio-visuelles (ACPAV), which would play an important role in Quebec cinema over the next decades by funding and releasing the earliest films by many emerging Quebec directors.

=== The 1980s ===
The victory of the "no" camp in the referendum on sovereignty association was a turning point in Québécois history and culture. Denys Arcand made one of his most acclaimed picture with the NFB, Le confort et l'indifférence, about the result of the referendum. He then proceeded to direct two movies that were nominated for best foreign picture at the Academy Awards: 1986's The Decline of the American Empire (Le Déclin de l'empire américain) and 1989's Jesus of Montreal (Jésus de Montréal).

After 1980, a lot of artists felt that the struggle to build a nation that had animated early Quebec cinema was lost. Québécois filmmakers began to make movies that were no longer centred on the Québécois identity. The 1986 success, at home and abroad, of Le déclin... marked another turning point in the movie history of the province. The government-funded movie industry tried to repeat Arcand's success with international co-productions, big budget movies and so-called "mass audience movies".

Meanwhile, director Robert Morin made himself known with personal movies like Requiem for a Handsome Bastard (Requiem pour un beau sans-coeur). Claude Jutra committed suicide in the 1980s after a struggle with Alzheimer's disease, and Gilles Carle became too sick to direct.

=== The 1990s and 2000s ===
1990-2002 saw the solidification of Quebec's movie industry. Independent films such as Denis Villeneuve's Maelström, Denis Chouinard's L'Ange de goudron, and Un crabe dans la tête caught the media's attention. In 1994, Pierre Falardeau's Octobre told a fictionalized version of the October Crisis from the point of view of the Chenier Cell, the FLQ terrorist cell who in 1970 kidnapped and executed Quebec minister and Deputy Premier Pierre Laporte.

Home-made blockbusters came in 2000s and begin to dominate their home market, putting American blockbusters in second place. Séraphin: un homme et son péché, directed by Charles Binamé, was a major success at the box office in 2002. The next year, 2003, was called "the year of Quebec cinema's rebirth" with Denys Arcand winning the foreign film Oscar for The Barbarian Invasions (Les Invasions barbares), the sequel of The Decline of the American Empire (Le Déclin de l'empire américain), and with Gaz Bar Blues and Seducing Doctor Lewis gaining both critical and public acclaim. In 2005, C.R.A.Z.Y. was released, grossing a considerable amount in such a small market, and garnering widespread praise from critics. In 2006, the Quebec-made action-comedy Bon Cop, Bad Cop, a film with dialogue in both French and English, took over the title of most popular Canadian film at the Canadian box office. Sales for Bon Cop, Bad Cop have totalled $13 million across the country. The previous Quebec film to hold this honour was Les Boys. In 2007, Arcand's Days of Darkness (L'Âge des ténèbres) was selected as the closing film for the Cannes Film Festival.

In 2009, De père en flic (English: Father and Guns) matched the movie Bon Cop Bad Cop to become the highest-grossing French language film in Canadian history.

=== The 2010s ===
The 2010s were marked by three consecutive Academy Award nominations for Quebecois films in the Foreign Language category, namely for Incendies (2010), Monsieur Lazhar (2011) and War Witch (2012). War Witch director Kim Nguyen proclaimed "People around the world are looking at Quebec cinema now and waiting for the next director to come out of here. This has a tremendous impact on a country's recognition outside of its borders". University of Berlin film scholar Claudia Kotte wrote Incendies, Monsieur Lazhar, Inch'Allah (2012) and War Witch, represent a break from focus on local history to more global concerns.

In May 2016, Xavier Dolan became the first Quebec filmmaker to win the Grand Prix at the Cannes Film Festival, for It's Only the End of the World. It also later won Best Film at the inaugural Prix Iris, which replaced the Jutra Awards for Quebec films, with new categories for Casting, Visual Effects, Revelation of the Year and Documentary Editing and Cinematography, and a Public Prix, chosen by viewers' votes.

== Bibliography ==
=== Books ===
Fradet, Pierre-Alexandre and Olivier Ducharme, Une vie sans bon sens. Regard philosophique sur Pierre Perrault, foreword by Jean-Daniel Lafond, Montréal, Nota bene, 2016.

Evans, Gary. John Grierson and the National Film Board: The Politics of Wartime Propaganda. Toronto: University of Toronto Press, 1984.

Evans, Gary. In the National Interest: A Chronicle of the National Film Board of Canada from 1949 to 1989. Toronto: University of Toronto Press, 1991.

- Pallister, Janis L. The Cinema of Québec: Masters in Their Own House. Madison, NJ: Fairleigh Dickinson University Press, 1995.

=== Issues ===
- Sylvano Santini and Pierre-Alexandre Fradet, "Au film de la pensée : un Québec philosophe", issue "Cinéma et philosophie", in Nouvelles Vues, #17, winter-spring 2016 : https://web.archive.org/web/20161102065003/http://www.nouvellesvues.ulaval.ca/no-17-hiver-2016-cinema-et-philosophie-par-s-santini-et-p-a-fradet/presentation/au-film-de-la-pensee-un-quebec-philosophe-par-sylvano-santini-et-pierre-alexandre-fradet/

=== Films ===
- From NFB to Box-Office, 2009 documentary by Denys Desjardins about the development of Quebec cinema, from the founding of the National Film Board of Canada to the creation of the Canadian Film Development Corporation in 1968
- Rubbo, Michael (1972). "OK ... Camera" (Documentary film about the Quebec film industry). NFB.ca. National Film Board of Canada.

== Filmography ==
=== Feature films Quebec Production Services Tax Credit ===
- Who Gets the House? (1999)
- The Triplets of Belleville (2003)
- Kart Racer (2003)
- Caillou's Holiday Movie (2003)
- The Blue Butterfly (2004)
- Head in the Clouds (film) (2004)
- The Last Casino (2004)
- Kaena: The Prophecy (2003)
- Decoys (film) (2004)
- Mr. Average (2006)
- Decoys 2: Alien Seduction (2007)
- 300 (film) (2007)
- Oscar and the Lady in Pink (film) (2009)
- The Final Destination (2009)
- The Twilight Saga: Breaking Dawn – Part 2 (2012)
- The Smurfs 2 (2013)
- 22 Jump Street (2014)
- Teenage Mutant Ninja Turtles (2014 film) (2014)
- Mune: Guardian of the Moon (2014)
- Cinderella (2015 American film) (2015)
- The Martian (film) (2015)
- The Last Witch Hunter (2015)
- Nine Lives (2016 film) (2015)
- Captain Underpants: The First Epic Movie (2017)
- The Star (2017 film) (2017)
- Detective Pikachu (film) (2019)
- The SpongeBob Movie: Sponge on the Run (2020)
- Rock Dog 2: Rock Around The Park (2021)
- Space Jam: A New Legacy (2021)
- Paw Patrol: The Movie (2021)
- Extinct (film) (2021)
- Chip 'n Dale: Rescue Rangers (film) (2022)
- Cracké Family Scramble (2022)
- Toopy and Binoo: The Movie
- Barbie (film) (2023)
- Teenage Mutant Ninja Turtles: Mutant Mayhem (2023)
- The Garfield Movie (2024)
- Joker: Folie à Deux (2024)

== See also ==
- Cinema of the world
- Culture of Quebec
- List of Quebec actors
- List of Quebec film directors
- List of Quebec films
- Prix Albert-Tessier
- Quebec film pioneer Léo-Ernest Ouimet
