= List of Quebec actors =

This is a list of Canadian actresses and actors from the province of Québec, Canada.

== A ==
- Paul Ahmarani
- Karina Aktouf
- Benz Antoine
- Denys Arcand
- Gabriel Arcand
- François Arnaud
- Sylvio Arriola
- Robin Aubert
- Charlotte Aubin

== B ==
- Jessica Barker
- Jay Baruchel
- Christian Bégin
- Dorothée Berryman
- Émilie Bierre
- Yannick Bisson
- Isabelle Blais
- Claude Blanchard
- Lothaire Bluteau
- Raymond Bouchard
- Jean-Carl Boucher
- Glenda Braganza
- Pierre Brassard
- Pierre-Luc Brillant
- Evelyne Brochu
- Geneviève Brouillette
- Geneviève Bujold
- Pascale Bussières

== C ==
- Sophie Cadieux
- Jesse Camacho
- Mark Camacho
- France Castel
- Monia Chokri
- Yves Corbeil
- Irlande Côté
- Jean Coutu
- Stéphane Crête
- Marie-Josée Croze
- Pierre Curzi
- Elisha Cuthbert

== D ==
- Normand D'Amour
- Ellen David
- Stéphane Demers
- Caroline Dhavernas
- Véronic DiCaire
- Xavier Dolan
- Mike Dopud
- Fifi D'Orsay
- Anne Dorval
- Jean Duceppe
- André Ducharme
- Paul Dupuis
- Roy Dupuis

== F ==
- Marc Favreau
- Colm Feore
- Jennifer Finnigan
- Glenn Ford
- Michel Forget

== G ==
- Claude Gauthier
- Gratien Gélinas
- Mitsou Gélinas
- Émile Genest
- Rémy Girard
- Fernande Giroux
- Huntley Gordon
- Robert Gravel
- Marc-André Grondin
- Bruce Greenwood

== H ==
- Patrick Hivon
- William Hope
- Germain Houde
- Patrick Huard

== J ==
- Claude Jutra
- Garihanna Jean-Louis

== K ==
- Anthony Kavanagh
- Joey Klein

== L ==
- Florence LaBadie
- Marc Labrèche
- Andrée Lachapelle
- Micheline Lanctôt
- Alexandre Landry
- Bruno Landry
- Jean Lapointe
- Stéphanie Lapointe
- Carole Laure
- Lucie Laurier
- Daniel Lavoie
- Ron Lea
- Pierre Lebeau
- Laurence Leboeuf
- Julie Le Breton
- Jean LeClerc
- Véronique Le Flaguais
- Rachelle Lefevre
- Claude Legault
- Guillaume Lemay-Thivierge
- Guy A. Lepage
- Robert Lepage
- Pauline Little

== M ==
- Fanny Mallette
- Sylvain Marcel
- Alexis Martin
- Patricia McKenzie
- Luck Mervil
- Marc Messier
- Dominique Michel
- Albert Millaire
- Sylvie Moreau
- Wajdi Mouawad

== N ==
- Sophie Nélisse

== P ==
- Mahée Paiement
- François Papineau
- Jessica Paré
- Théodore Pellerin
- Yves P. Pelletier
- Missy Peregrym
- Luc Picard
- Antoine Olivier Pilon
- Daniel Pilon
- Donald Pilon
- Yvan Ponton
- Julien Poulin
- Brigitte Poupart
- Marie Prevost
- Danielle Proulx
- Émile Proulx-Cloutier
- Guy Provost

== R ==
- Chantal Renaud
- Ginette Reno
- Isabel Richer
- Patrice Robitaille
- Stéphane Rousseau
- Jean-Louis Roux
- Gildor Roy
- Maxim Roy

== S ==
- Gabriel Sabourin
- Marcel Sabourin
- Michael Sarrazin
- Geneviève Schmidt
- Émile Schneider
- William Shatner
- Norma Shearer
- Gilbert Sicotte
- Hugo St-Cyr
- Janine Sutto

== T ==
- Serge Thériault
- Marie-Soleil Tougas
- Fannie Tremblay
- Serge Turgeon

== V ==
- Karine Vanasse
- Marianne Verville

== W ==
- Amanda Walsh
- Joseph Wiseman

== See also ==
- Jutra Award
- List of Quebecers
- List of Quebec comedians
- Cinema of Quebec
- Culture of Quebec
