= Orders (1974 film) =

Les Ordres
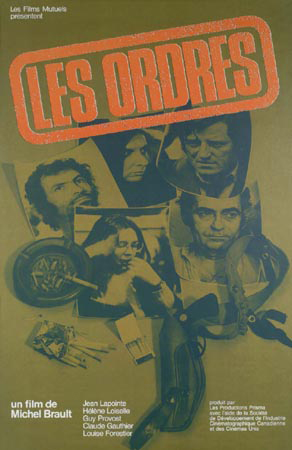
- Directed by: Michel Brault
- Written by: Michel Brault
- Produced by: Guy Dufaux; Bernard Lalonde; Claude Godbout
- Starring: Jean Lapointe; Hélène Loiselle; Guy Provost; Claude Gauthier; Louise Forestier
- Cinematography: Michel Brault; François Protat
- Edited by: Yves Dion
- Production company: Productions Prisma
- Release date: September 27, 1974
- Running time: 109 minutes
- Country: Canada
- Language: French
- Budget: $250,000
- Box office: $500,000

Orders (French: Les Ordres; known in the United States as: Orderers) is a 1974 Quebec historical drama film about the incarceration of innocent civilians during the 1970 October Crisis following the War Measures Act enacted by the Canadian government of Pierre Trudeau. It is the second film by director Michel Brault. It features entertainer and Senator Jean Lapointe.

The film was selected as the Canadian entry for the Best Foreign Language Film at the 48th Academy Awards, but was not accepted as a nominee.

== Plot ==
In October 1970, following terrorist acts and demands by the Front de libération du Québec (FLQ), the Canadian government adopted the War Measures Act to restore law and order. The Act overrode fundamental rights and privileges enumerated in common law and in the Canadian Bill of Rights. This measure enabled the arbitrary arrest of more than 450 people, against whom no charges were ever laid. Some were held as many as 21 days.

The film tells the story of five of incarcerated civilians. The film is scripted, but is inspired by interviews with actual prisoners held during the events.

The film's style is inspired by the Quebec school of Cinéma vérité. It is a docufiction.

== Cast ==
- Hélène Loiselle as Marie Boudreau
- Jean Lapointe as Clermont Boudreau
- Guy Provost as Dr. Jean-Marie Beauchemin
- Claude Gauthier as Richard Lavoie
- Louise Forestier as Claudette Dusseault
- Louise Pratte as Louise Boudreau
- Martine Pratte as Martine Boudreau
- Monique Pratte as Monique Boudreau
- Amulette Garneau as Mrs. Thibault, The Neighbour
- Louise Latraverse as Claire Beauchemin
- Sophie Clément as Ginette Lavoie
- Esther Auger as Esther
- Claire Richard as Mrs. Vezina
- J. Léo Gagnon as The Grocer
- José Rettino as The Foreman

== Production ==
Orders had a budget of $250,000 (equivalent to $1,739,407 in 2025). The prison scenes were shot in colour while the rest of the film was shot in black-and-white.

== Release ==
Orders grossed $500,000 (equivalent to $3,133,588 in 2025) during its theatrical run.

== Awards ==
It shared a Cannes Film Festival Award in 1975 and four Canadian Film Awards (predecessor of the Genie Awards) the same year. It was also selected as the Canadian entry for the Best Foreign Language Film at the 48th Academy Awards, but was not accepted as a nominee. The film was selected to be screened in the Cannes Classics section of the 2015 Cannes Film Festival.

- 1975 Cannes Film Festival, won for Best Director (Michel Brault, tied with Costa Gavras for Section spéciale)
- 1975 Cannes Film Festival, nominated for Golden Palm (Michel Brault)
- 1975 Canadian Film Awards, won for Best Feature Film (Claude Godbout and Bernard Lalonde)
- 1975 Canadian Film Awards, won for Film of the Year (Claude Godbout and Bernard Lalonde)
- 1975 Canadian Film Awards, won for Best Original Script (Michel Brault)
- 1975 Canadian Film Awards, won for Best Direction (Michel Brault)
- The Toronto International Film Festival ranked it in the Top 10 Canadian Films of All Time four times, in 1984, 1993, 2004 and 2015.

== See also ==
- Docufiction
- List of docufiction films
- List of Quebec films
- Cinema of Quebec
- Culture of Quebec
- Quebec independence movement
- History of Quebec
- List of submissions to the 48th Academy Awards for Best Foreign Language Film
- List of Canadian submissions for the Academy Award for Best Foreign Language Film

== Works cited ==
- Walz, Eugene, ed. (2002). Canada’s Best Features: Critical essays on 15 Canadian films. Brill Publishers. ISBN 978-94-012-0014-1.
