= Fannie Tremblay =

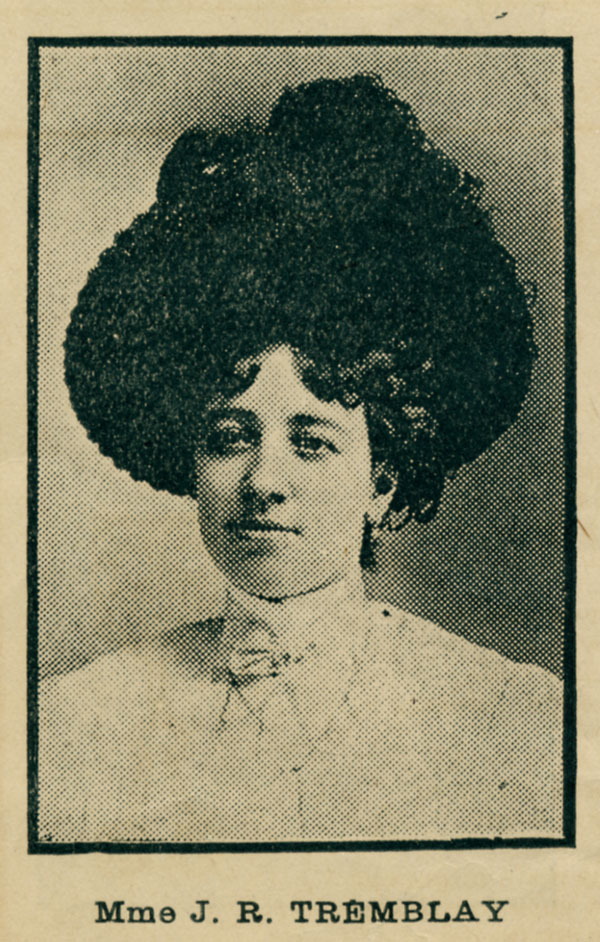
- Born: January 5, 1885; Montreal, Quebec, Canada
- Died: January 18, 1970 (aged 85); Montreal, Quebec
- Resting place: Notre Dame des Neiges Cemetery

Fannie Tremblay, the stage name of Stéphanie Massey (January 5, 1885 – January 18, 1970), was a Canadian performer based in Quebec.

Tremblay first adopted the stage name Fannie Brémont. She performed with Paul Cazeneuve's troupe at the Théâtre national. Tremblay appeared in a stage adaptation of Uncle Tom's Cabin at the National Theatre with Juliette Béliveau. In 1901, she married Joseph-Robert Tremblay, also a member of the troupe at the National Theatre. Between 1920 and 1924, Tremblay and her husband managed the Théâtre Impérial in Quebec City. The couple also helped found the Troupe du Clocher, which may have been the first touring francophone troupe in Canada. She performed in many radio soap operas during the 1930s. Tremblay starred in Gratien Gélinas's Fridolinades revues and also appeared in several early Quebec full-length films, including The Music Master (Le Père Chopin), The Village Priest (Le Curé de village) and A Man and His Sin. From 1954 to 1957, she appeared in the Radio-Canada television soap opera 14, rue de Galais.

She was one of the first francophone performers to record for Starr Records, recording 34 humorous sketches. She also recorded a dozen sketches for His Master's Voice from 1924 to 1925.

Tremblay died in Montreal at the age of 85 and was entombed at the Notre Dame des Neiges Cemetery.
