= 2nd Canadian Film Awards =

1950 awards for Canadian film

- Date: April 19, 1950
- Location: Little Elgin Theatre, Ottawa, Ontario
- Hosted by: Louis St. Laurent

The 2nd Canadian Film Awards were presented on April 19, 1950 to honour achievements in Canadian film. The ceremony was hosted by Prime Minister Louis St. Laurent.

The number of entries for this year's awards rose to 43, from 21 producers. Only one feature-length theatrical film was entered—Quebec Productions' Le Curé de village. The quality of all entries was so high, the jury could not choose a Film of the Year, instead opting to award Special Citations.

== Winners ==
- Film of the Year: Not awarded
- Theatrical Short: La terre de Caïn (North Shore) — National Film Board of Canada, James Beveridge producer, Pierre Petel director

Honourable Mention: Summer Is for Kids — National Film Board of Canada, Sydney Newman producer, Stanley Jackson director

- Non-Theatrical, Open: Family Circles — National Film Board of Canada, Gudrun Parker and Tom Daly producers, Morten Parker director

Honourable Mention: Children's Concert — National Film Board of Canada, Gudrun Parker producer and director

- Non-Theatrical, Sponsored: Science at Your Service — National Film Board of Canada, Tom Daly producer, Ronald Dick director

Honourable Mention: Zéro de conduite (Winter Blunderland) — Crawley Films, F. R. Crawley producer

- Amateur: Mouvement perpétuel (Perpetual Movement) — Claude Jutra producer and director

Honourable Mention: In the Daytime — Stanley Fox, Peter Varley producers

- Special Awards:

- Primitive Artists of Haiti — Benoît and de Tonnancourt Films, Réal Benoît, André de Tonnancourt producers, "for its successful attempt to interpret other cultures and other peoples to Canadians".
- Begone Dull Care — National Film Board of Canada, Norman McLaren producer, Norman McLaren and Evelyn Lambart directors - "in recognition of the successful contribution of an experimental approach to filmmaking by Norman McLaren and his associates".
- Quebec Productions, Paul L'Anglais and René Germain producers, "for sustained and creative effort in establishing a feature-length film industry in Canada" (through its creation of the films The Village Priest (Le Curé de Village), Whispering City/La Forteresse, A Man and His Sin (Un homme et son péché) and Séraphin).

- Special Citations:

The Canadian Heritage — Audio Pictures
Animules — Louis Shore
Borderline Cases — Associated Screen Studios, Bernard Norrish producer, Gordon Sparling director
Ballet Festival — National Film Board of Canada, Don Mulholland producer, Roger Blais director
Portrait — Robert Sparks, Phyllis Mawdsley
A Mile Below the Wheat — Crawley Films, Gerald Moses director
The Rising Tide — National Film Board of Canada, James Beveridge producer, Jean Palardy director
