= Sicotte =

Sicotte is a surname of French origin. Notable people with the surname include:

- Anne-Marie Sicotte (born 1962), Canadian writer
- Antoine Sicotte, member of the Canadian band Sky
- Gilbert Sicotte (born 1948), Canadian actor
- Louis-Victor Sicotte (1812–1889), Canadian lawyer, judge and politician

== See also ==
- Sicot, people with this surname
