= Sico =

Sico may refer to:

- Sico of Benevento or Sico I (c. 758–832), Prince of Benevento
- Sico of Salerno or Sico II (died 855), Prince of Salerno
- SICO Technology, an Egyptian manufacturer of mobile phones

== See also ==
- Silicon carbonate, a chemical compound with formula SiCO_{4}
- Sicot, people with this surname
