= Séraphin (film) =

1950 film by Paul Gury

- Directed by: Paul Gury
- Written by: Paul Gury
- Based on: Un homme et son péché by Claude-Henri Grignon
- Produced by: Paul L'Anglais
- Starring: Hector Charland; Nicole Germain; Guy Provost; Eddy Tremblay
- Cinematography: Drummond Drury
- Edited by: Jean Boisvert
- Music by: Paul Colbert; Arthur Morrow
- Production company: Quebec Productions
- Distributed by: France Film
- Release date: February 17, 1950
- Running time: 102 minutes
- Country: Canada
- Language: French

Séraphin is a Canadian drama film, directed by Paul Gury and released in 1950. A sequel to the 1949 film A Man and His Sin (Un homme et son péché), which was an adaptation of the novel by Claude-Henri Grignon, the film tells the story of Séraphin Poudrier's family and community getting their revenge on him for his miserliness and lack of compassion amid the context of Antoine Labelle's drive to increase the settlement and development of the region.

Hector Charland, Nicole Germain and Guy Provost all reprised their roles as Séraphin, Donalda and Alexis from the first film; the only major change in the core cast was Eddy Tremblay replacing Ovila Légaré as Labelle.

The cast also included Suzanne Avon, Henri Poitras, Antoinette Giroux, Marcel Sylvain, Armand Leguet, Jeannette Teasdale, Camille Ducharme, Eugène Daigneault, J. Léo Gagnon, Lorenzo Bariteau and Alain Boisvert, as well as Grignon himself in a small role as a rebel settler.

== Response ==
At the 2nd Canadian Film Awards the following year, Quebec Productions, the studio of producer Paul L'Anglais and his business partner René Germain, received a special citation "for sustained and creative effort in establishing a feature-length film industry in Canada", collectively based on the films A Man and His Sin, Séraphin, Whispering City/La Forteresse and The Village Priest (Le Curé du village).

Quebec film historian Pierre Véronneau later characterized A Man and His Sin, The Village Priest and Séraphin as a group of films about "cowboys in cassocks", which transplanted some of the heroic tropes of Western films onto priests in the church-dominated society of pre-Quiet Revolution Quebec.
