= The Rising Tide (film) =

1949 film

- Directed by: Jean Palardy
- Written by: Jean Palardy; Donald Peters; Kathleen McColgan
- Produced by: James Beveridge
- Narrated by: John Drainie; Alan Maitland
- Cinematography: John Foster
- Edited by: Donald Peters; Jean Palardy
- Music by: Robert Fleming
- Distributed by: National Film Board of Canada
- Release date: 1949
- Running time: 29:23 minutes
- Country: Canada
- Language: English

The Rising Tide is a 1949 Canadian short documentary film directed by Jean Palardy and produced by the National Film Board of Canada.

Produced with the cooperation of the governments of New Brunswick, Nova Scotia, and Prince Edward Island and the extension department of St. Francis Xavier University, the film shows the growth of cooperatives in the Maritime provinces, and how they gave new life and hope to poverty-stricken fishermen.

The main part of the story deals with the daily life of fishing folk (one-sixth of the Maritimes' population at the time), specifically a Francophone fisherman named Willie Leblanc, and shows how the establishment of the United Maritime Fisherman cooperative helped fishermen moved out of the hungry, hopeless years of the 1920s and on to better times.

The Rising Tide, which was released in French as Maree montante, was awarded a special citation at the 2nd Canadian Film Awards in 1950.

At the 22nd Academy Awards, also in 1950, it was nominated for the Academy Award for Best Documentary Short Film.

The complete film is available for viewing online, care of the National Film Board of Canada.

== See also ==
- Herring Hunt, a 1953 NFB short documentary about B.C.'s herring fishery
