= On the Riviera =

1951 film by Walter Lang

- 1951 movie poster
- Directed by: Walter Lang
- Written by: screenplay by Valentine Davies; Henry Ephron; Phoebe Ephron based on a play by Hans Adler; Rudolph Lothar
- Produced by: Sol C. Siegel
- Starring: Danny Kaye; Gene Tierney; Corinne Calvet; Marcel Dalio; Jean Murat; Henri Letondal; Clinton Sundberg; Sig Ruman; Joyce MacKenzie; Monique Chantal; Marina Koshetz
- Cinematography: Leon Shamroy
- Edited by: J. Watson Webb Jr.
- Music by: Alfred Newman; Sylvia Fine
- Distributed by: 20th Century Fox
- Release date: April 20, 1951
- Running time: 90 minutes
- Country: United States
- Language: English
- Box office: $2.5 million (US rentals)

On the Riviera is a 1951 Technicolor musical comedy film made by 20th Century Fox. Directed by Walter Lang and produced by Sol C. Siegel from a screenplay by Valentine Davies and Phoebe and Henry Ephron, it is the studio's fourth film based on the 1934 play The Red Cat by Rudolph Lothar and Hans Adler. This version stars Danny Kaye, Gene Tierney and Corinne Calvet, with Marcel Dalio, Henri Letondal and Sig Ruman.

The studio had signed Kaye for a one-picture deal, and revived the story as a vehicle for the multi-talented actor, who had a history of playing dual or multiple roles.

On the Riviera was nominated for two Academy Awards: Scoring of a Musical Picture (by Alfred Newman) and Best Art Direction in Color (Art Directors Lyle R. Wheeler, Leland Fuller, Joseph C. Wright, and Set Decorators Thomas Little and Walter M. Scott).

== Plot ==
At the Côte d'Azur nightclub in Monte Carlo, American entertainer Jack Martin is a hit with his singing, dancing and impressions. One night, everyone in the club flocks to a television to watch famed aviator Captain Henri Duran land in Nice, concluding a record-breaking round-the-world flight. Jack's partner—and girlfriend—Colette reminds him to put on his glasses, and they agree that Duran looks like Jack. Bored, Gapeaux insists that Jack make his act "sensational", or else.

Jack paints a mustache on his lip, looks in the mirror and smiles.

The club's gala honoring Duran and his wife, Lili opens with a lavish production playing off Duran's deserved reputation as an international Don Juan. Backstage, Collette briefly mistakes Duran for Jack. Duran invites her to a reception on Saturday. Panic-stricken. Duran's associate Philippe brings bad news. Air Europa Director Periton is delaying his purchase of their planes, clearly hoping to ruin their company and take it over. Not knowing this, Lili invites Periton to the reception.

Duran leaves a note for Louis and Phillipe: He has flown to London for help. They persuade Jack to play Duran, for half a million francs. He insists that Lili not know. He would be too nervous. (They do tell her.) Jack is a quick study, and they teach him Duran's noncommittal gesture and comment: "Hmmmmm…"

Jack spends much of the party fending off Duran's ladies.

At the nightclub, Gapeaux tells Colette that he has booked a live television broadcast. She storms off to the party and is greeted by Jack/Duran, who makes a pass at her. She sees the eyeglasses in his pocket, plays along—and slaps him. Their jealous fight ends when he tells her how much they are being paid. She remembers the broadcast. He sends her to reassure Gapeaux.

Duran returns, unnoticed, sees Jack at the party and understands. But when Jack kisses Lili's hand, his eyes widen. He watches Jack drive away. Two guests watch Jack's live broadcast, featuring Jack as "Popo the Puppet".

Duran was turned down by Sir Hubert. The guys reassure him that Lilli is in on the masquerade. When he kisses her, she tells him he has been acting "like a schoolboy with his first crush" all night. He is jealous. At the nightclub, Jack and Colette fight over her jealousy of Lili.

Duran discovers that Periton suspects the Air Ministry is making Duran a better offer. Jack returns to the house. Confusion ensues. Periton makes Jack/Duran an offer of 20 billion francs, then 25 billion... Cut to the hall where Duran and the guys are waiting...

Louis pays Jack off, telling him to get his clothes tomorrow and leaving everyone ignorant of Periton's offers. Duran tells them not to let anyone know he is back, including Lili. He will be Martin for the rest of the evening...

The next morning, the boys rush to Duran's yacht. He is despondent. Lili has betrayed him. With himself. He went to her room, embraced her, and they had sex. He never realized how wonderful she was. He cannot face her. He is leaving. When the guys suggest that she saw through his deception, he remembers she was angry at first, then changed. Cut to Lili having breakfast in bed, smiling happily. Duran calls her from the airport, pretending to have just landed. She is horrified. The airport staff and their servants lie for him.

Periton arrives at the yacht and is surprised to see them so gloomy: He has a cheque for 30 billion francs.

At the house, Lili finds Jack collecting his clothes. They talk at cross-purposes, in double entendres, until he tells her he left after the Captain arrived. Cut to the front hall and Duran's return. Jack tells Duran that he should concentrate on his lovely wife from now on, and asks Duran about his way with women. What is his secret? Duran whispers in his ear.

At the nightclub, Lili and Duran are holding hands in the audience while Jack, the chorus and Colette do an exuberant number: "Happy Ending".

== Cast ==
- Danny Kaye as Jack Martin / Henri Duran
- Gene Tierney as Lili Duran
- Corinne Calvet as Colette
- Marcel Dalio as Philippe Lebrix
- Jean Murat as Felix Periton
- Henri Letondal as Louis Foral
- Clinton Sundberg as Antoine
- Sig Ruman as Gapeaux
- Joyce MacKenzie as Mimi
- Monique Chantal as Minette
- Marina Koshetz as Louise
- Ann Codee as Madeleine Periton (uncredited)
- Mari Blanchard as Eugenie (uncredited)

== Production ==
The Red Cat, which was produced for the stage by 20th Century Fox's Darryl Zanuck, ran for only 13 performances, but the studio benefited from the film adaptations. The first two were directed by Roy Del Ruth: Folies Bergère (1935) stars Maurice Chevalier, Merle Oberon and Ann Sothern, and a 1935 French-language version, L'homme des Folies Bergère, stars Chevalier and Natalie Paley. Irving Cummings directed the 1941 adaptation, That Night in Rio, which stars Don Ameche, Alice Faye and Carmen Miranda.

On the Riviera had trouble with the censors, who wrote: "the last part of the story...seems to be based in large measure on the suspicion of illicit relationships between the various characters." However, the final script was approved, with Lili's temporary confusion over the identity of the man with whom she spent the night intact.

Kaye's wife, songwriter and lyricist Sylvia Fine, wrote four pieces for the picture. One of those, Popo the Puppet, became a signature song for Kaye. In the film, it is presented as an elaborate production number with flying marionettes, seen over color television. On Sunday, May 20, 1951, The New York Times featured a four-column-wide photo of the French puppet sequence at the top of Page 225.

The color television sequences in this film would have fascinated the audience in 1951, when color TV was a rarity. The first color television broadcasts in the United States occurred in 1951 and 1953. (In France, where the film is set, the first color broadcast was in 1967.) Coaxial cable and closed circuit transmission preceded the broadcast format.

Gwen Verdon, credited as Gwyneth Verdon, appears in dance sequences choreographed and staged by Jack Cole. This was her first appearance on film.

The set decoration (nominated for an Academy Award) includes a portrait of Lili Duran. It is the portrait of Gene Tierney as Laura Hunt created for the 1944 film, Laura.

== Reception ==
New York Times critic Bosley Crowther recalled the two previous versions of the story for his readers and continued: "Now, brushed up slightly by Valentine Davies and Phoebe and Henry Ephron; equipped with four musical numbers by Mr. Kaye's wife, Sylvia Fine, and turned out in gorgeous Technicolor that does justice to a splash production and a well-fed cast, it does service for Mr. Kaye's talents... (S)omething better could certainly have been found for this brilliant comedian's performance than this hackneyed and unexciting tale... the plot is too mixed up to follow and isn't very funny anyhow... Gene Tierney looks better in new garments than the old story looks upon her. And Corinne Calvet is pretty but neglected.. Marcel Dalio and Henri Letondal do a Tweedledum and Tweedledee routine... There are also lots of pretty girls."

At the time of the film's release, Variety staff praised "the glib script, loaded with fast and furious dialog quips... Full range of the Kaye talent is used, both in the music-comedy divisions and in straight performance. It’s a wow delivery he gives. Four tunes, three of which are used to back the potent production numbers, were cleffed by Sylvia Fine to show off the Kaye talent for fun-making."

Writing for Turner Classic Movies in the 21st century, Jay S. Steinburg observes: "The studio dusted off a mistaken-identity screenplay that it had already utilized twice before; still, it proved an ideal fit for its star's strengths, and combined with beautiful female leads, colorful locales, and engaging set pieces, it delivered an entertainment that still holds up well."

Leonard Maltin gives the film 3 out of 4 stars: "Bouncy musicomedy with Danny in dual role as entertainer and French military hero. 'Ballin' the Jack,' other songs in lively film. Gwen Verdon is one of chorus girls."
