= Yvette Brind'Amour =

Canadian actress

Yvette Brind'Amour CC OQ
- Born: November 30, 1918; Montreal, Quebec, Canada
- Died: April 4, 1991 (aged 72); Montreal, Quebec, Canada
- Resting place: Notre Dame des Neiges Cemetery
- Occupation: Actress
- Spouse: Paul Gury
- Awards: Order of Canada; National Order of Quebec

Yvette Brind'Amour, CC OQ (November 30, 1918 – April 4, 1991) was a Canadian actress.

In 1949, she co-founded, with Mercedes Palomino, the Théâtre du Rideau Vert, Quebec's oldest French theatre, in Montreal where she was born. She was artistic director until her death. In 1967 she was made an Officer of the Order of Canada and was promoted to Companion in 1982. In 1985 she was made an Officer of the National Order of Quebec. In 1987 she was awarded the Molson Prize. In 1969 she was awarded an honorary D.B.-A{Clarify} from University of Ottawa.

She was married for much of her adult life to writer and filmmaker Paul Gury, until his death in 1974.

After her death in 1991, she was entombed at the Notre Dame des Neiges Cemetery in Montreal.
