= Séraphin: Heart of Stone =

- French: Séraphin: Un homme et son péché
- Directed by: Charles Binamé
- Written by: Pierre Billon; Charles Binamé; Lorraine Richard; Antonine Maillet
- Based on: Un homme et son péché by Claude-Henri Grignon
- Produced by: Louis Laverdière; Luc Martineau
- Starring: Pierre Lebeau; Karine Vanasse; Roy Dupuis
- Music by: Michel Cusson
- Distributed by: Alliance Atlantis Vivafilm
- Release date: 29 November 2002
- Running time: 128 min
- Country: Canada
- Language: French

Séraphin: Heart of Stone (French: Séraphin: Un homme et son péché, lit. 'Séraphin: A Man and His Sin') is a 2002 Quebec drama film. The script is based on the novel Un homme et son péché by Claude-Henri Grignon. The film won six Prix Jutra for Best Actor (Pierre Lebeau), Best Actress (Karine Vanasse), Cinematography, Art Direction, Musical Score and Sound. An earlier film, A Man and His Sin (Un homme et son péché), based on the same novel, was released in 1949; the same novel was also the basis for the long-running dramatic television series Les Belles histoires des pays d'en haut.

== Plot ==
In a small Quebec community at the end of the 19th century, due to her father's financial hardships, Donalda Laloge (Vanasse) is forced to marry the village miser (also the mayor), Séraphin Poudrier (Lebeau), and to leave behind the young man that she truly loves. Her beloved, Alexis (Roy Dupuis), returns from working at the lumber camps, unaware of these events.

Donalda is extremely unhappy living with Séraphin, as his miserly lifestyle is often at the expense of her personal well-being. This includes refusing to father children, and severely rationing meals. Donalda becomes very sick with a pneumonia-like illness. Alexis returns home meanwhile, and his realizing of the situation sparks tension among the villagers. Donalda dies from the disease shortly after his arrival. During Donalda's funeral, Séraphin realizes his home is on fire. He panics and runs into the blaze, succumbing to the flames as he attempts to save his wealth. Alexis pulls him out of the burning house. The villagers pry open Séraphin's hands, which are revealed to have been clutching coins.
