= Morris Davis (composer) =

Canadian composer, arranger and conductor

Morris Cecil Davis (1 March 1904 – 13 November 1968) was a Canadian composer, arranger, and conductor. He was sometimes referred to as "Rusty Davis". A largely self-taught composer and orchestrater, he wrote more than 200 jingles for Canadian radio and television. He also contributed incidental music to more than 100 radio and TV programs and composed more than 30 scores for feature films; including the scores to Whispering City (1947), La Forteresse (1947), Le Curé de village (1949), and Tambour battant (1952). He also composed a number of orchestral works, songs, and jazz pieces. His jazz concerto Blues and Finales in G (1942) is written in the style of Rhapsody in Blue, and his Serenade for Trumpet in Jazz (composed before 1948) was played often in concerts by Maynard Ferguson.

== Life and career ==
Born in Ottawa, Davis began his musical education in Montreal where he studied the piano with such teachers as Nicholas Eichorn, Alfred La Liberté, and A.E.J. MacCreary. He studied law at McGill University (MU) where he earned of Bachelor of Arts in 1930. While a student there he notably wrote the MU's annual Red and White Revue in 1926 and 1927. In 1927 he co-wrote the review The Little Revue that Starts at 10 Past Nine with Robert E. Dolan which was premiered at the Orpheum in Vancouver.

In 1929 Davis began working for CBC Radio as a pianist and conductor. From 1937–1947 he worked as a music producer at CBC Montreal where he notably arranged music for conductors like Lucio Agostini, Jean Deslauriers, and Allan McIver. He left the CBC to establish his own production house in Montreal in 1948. He thereafter worked actively as a freelance composer, arranger, and conductor in the Montreal area. He conducted several commercial orchestras and composed a number of jingles and film scores for radio and television. He also worked as a music director for theatrical productions in several Canadian cities. He notably conducted the studio orchestra for a 1962 LP album with accordionist Gordie Fleming.
