= Wow (film) =

- Directed by: Claude Jutra
- Written by: Danielle Bail; Pierre Charpentier
- Produced by: Robert Forget
- Starring: Danielle Bail; Pierre Charpentier; Philippe Dubé; Dave Gold; Marc Harvey; François Jasmin; Michèle Mercure; Philippe Raoul; Monique Simard
- Cinematography: Gilles Gascon; André-Luc Dupont
- Edited by: Claire Boyer; Yves Dion; Claude Jutra
- Music by: Pierre F. Brault; Jim Solkin
- Distributed by: National Film Board of Canada
- Release date: 1969
- Running time: 94 minutes
- Country: Canada
- Language: French
- Budget: $171,886

Wow is a 1969 Québécois film directed by Claude Jutra, produced by the National Film Board of Canada.

== Synopsis ==
Claude Jutra's first feature-length film is an improvised docudrama about the lives and dreams of nine Montreal young people. The film is made up of nine separate episodes, each one expressing a particular fantasy of one member of the group. This exuberant, low-budget effort, shot in the style of the French New Wave films, provides hints of Jutra's immense talents as a director.

== Production ==
Subjects in the film included some participants Jutra had worked with in his 1966 mockumentary film The Devil's Toy (Rouli-roulant), a faux-anti-skateboarding propaganda film.

== Sequel ==
Thirty years after the production of Wow, the NFB co-produced a sequel Wow 2, using the same concept of adolescents acting out their dreams. This film was directed by Jean-Philippe Duval and co-produced by Monique Simard, who was a participant in the original film.

== Works cited ==
- Evans, Gary (1991). In the National Interest: A Chronicle of the National Film Board of Canada from 1949 to 1989. University of Toronto Press. ISBN 0802027849.
