= Death on the Run (1936 film) =

1936 film

- Directed by: André Berthomieu
- Written by: Loïc Le Gouriadec; Carlo Rim
- Produced by: Roger Richebé
- Starring: Jules Berry; Michel Simon; Marie Glory
- Cinematography: Jean Isnard
- Edited by: Marcel Cohen
- Music by: Marcel Lattès
- Production company: Films Roger Richebé
- Distributed by: Films Roger Richebé
- Release date: 20 November 1936
- Running time: 85 minutes
- Country: France
- Language: French

Death on the Run (French: Le mort en fuite) is a 1936 French comedy film directed by André Berthomieu and starring Jules Berry, Michel Simon and Marie Glory. It was made at the Neuilly Studios in Paris. The film's sets were designed by Jean d'Eaubonne. It was remade two years later in Britain as Break the News starring Jack Buchanan and Maurice Chevalier. In 1954 the film was remade in France.

== Synopsis ==
Two struggling actors decide to attract publicity by pretending that one has murdered the other, but things soon get out of hand.

== Cast ==
- Jules Berry as Hector Trignol
- Michel Simon as Achille Baluchet
- Marie Glory as Myrra
- Fernande Albany as Olga Stefany
- Gaston Mauger as Le directeur du théâtre
- Gabrielle Fontan as La concierge
- Paul Gury as Ivan
- Claire Gérard as Madame Irma
- Paul Faivre as Le gardien
- Jean Diéner
- Hugues de Bagratide as Le juge de Sergarie
- Georges Paulais as Un policier
- Pierre Mindaist
- Marcel Vibert as L'avocat
- Eddy Debray as La médecin aliéniste
- Robert Ozanne as Le reporter
- André Siméon as Un agent

== Bibliography ==
- Geoffrey Nowell-Smith. The Oxford History of World Cinema. Oxford University Press, 1997.
