= Death on the Run (1954 film) =

1954 film

- Directed by: André Berthomieu
- Written by: Paul Gury
- Produced by: André Berthomieu; Gilbert Cohen-Seat
- Starring: Jean Richard; Jean-Marc Thibault; Edith Georges
- Cinematography: Jean Benezech; Henri Martin; Georges Million; René Ribault
- Edited by: Denise Natot; Gilbert Natot
- Music by: Henri Betti
- Production companies: Bertho Films; Orsay Films
- Distributed by: Columbia Films
- Release date: 10 December 1954
- Running time: 86 minutes
- Country: France
- Language: French

Death on the Run (French: Les deux font la paire) is a 1954 French comedy film directed by André Berthomieu and starring Jean Richard, Jean-Marc Thibault and Edith Georges. It is a remake of the 1936 film of the same title which Berthomieu had also directed.

It was shot at the Billancourt Studios in Paris. The film's sets were designed by the art director Raymond Nègre.

== Synopsis ==
Two struggling actors attempt to make the headlines by pretending one of them has been murdered. However, events soon get out of hand.

== Cast ==
- Jean Richard as Achille Baluchet
- Jean-Marc Thibault as Hector Trignol
- Edith Georges as Myra
- Fred Pasquali as Le directeur du théâtre
- Maurice Biraud as L'avocat
- Jacqueline Maillan as Olga
- Arthur Allan as Ivan
- Charles Bouillaud as Le policier #1
- Pierre Ferval as Le policier #2
- Paul Faivre as Le gardien
- Robert Destain as Le juge d'instruction
- Robert Rollis as Pinard
- Marcel Vibert as Le président du tribunal
- Hugues de Bagratide as Le juge de Sergarie
- René Bergeron as Le procureur
- Alexandre Mihalesco as L'ordonnance
- Robert Blome as Le coiffeur
- Sabine André as La caissière
- Jack Ary as Un agent
- Jackie Sardou as The theatrical
- Bernard Dumaine
- Gaston Orbal as L'aliéniste #1
- Rivers Cadet as L'aliéniste #2
- Arthur Devère as Le détective
- Pauline Carton as La concierge
- Alice Tissot as L'habilleuse

== Bibliography ==
- Parish, James Robert. Film Actors Guide: Western Europe. Scarecrow Press, 1977.
