= Yves Lever =

Canadian film critic and historian (1942–2020)

Yves Lever (1942 – July 7, 2020) was a Canadian film critic and historian from Quebec. He was historically most noted for his 2016 biography of film director Claude Jutra, which addressed allegations that Jutra had sexually abused underage children. The statement was controversial, but Lever's publisher stood behind him, and Jutra's name was quickly removed from numerous cultural and geographic entities that had been named in his memory, including Quebec's Jutra Awards and the national Claude Jutra Award.

Born and raised in Marsoui, Quebec, Lever taught film studies at a variety of institutions throughout his career, including Collège Ahuntsic, the Université de Montréal and Université Laval. His other published books included Cinéma et société québécoise (1972), Histoire générale du cinéma au Québec (1988), Les 100 films québécois qu’il faut voir (1995), Dictionnaire de la censure au Québec : littérature et cinéma (2006) and J.A DeSève, diffuseur d'images (2008).
