= Sicot =

Sicot (English: /siːˈkoʊ/, French: [siko]) is a French surname. Notable people with the surname include:

- Antoine Sicot (born 1953), French operatic bass
- Danièle Sicot-Coulon (1935–2026), French gymnast
- Julien Sicot (born 1978), French Olympic freestyle swimmer
- Marion Sicot (born 1992), French racing cyclist
- Pierre-Nicolas Sicot, known as Pierre-Nicolas Legrand de Lérant (1758–1829), French painter
- Webert Sicot (1930–1985), Haitian saxophone player, composer and band leader

== See also ==
- Sicotte, people with this surname
