= René Delacroix =

René Delacroix (August 27, 1900 – June 11, 1976) was a French film director and screenwriter. He was most noted for a mid-career period from 1949 to 1954 when he was based in Montreal, during which he directed or co-directed several of the most important early feature films in the Cinema of Quebec. The film Tit-Coq, codirected with Gratien Gélinas, won the Canadian Film Award for Film of the Year at the 5th Canadian Film Awards in 1953.

== Filmography ==
- La relève - 1932
- Meute et kangourous... - 1935
- Promesses - 1939
- Notre-Dame de la Mouise - 1941, writer only
- The Murderer Is Not Guilty (L'assassin n'est pas coupable) - 1946
- Gonzague - 1947
- The Grand Bill (Le Gros Bill) - 1949, with Jean-Yves Bigras
- The Story of Dr. Louise (On ne triche pas la vie) - 1949, with Paul Vandenberghe
- They Are Twenty - 1950
- The Nightingale and the Bells (Le Rossignol et les cloches) - 1952
- Tit-Coq - 1953, with Gratien Gélinas
- A Mother's Heart - 1953
- The Heartthrob (Le Tombeur) - 1958
