= Robert Fleming (composer) =

Canadian composer, pianist, organist, choirmaster and teacher

- Born: Robert James Berkeley Fleming; November 12, 1921; Prince Albert, Saskatchewan, Canada
- Died: November 28, 1976 (aged 55); Ottawa, Ontario, Canada
- Occupations: Composer, pianist, organist, choirmaster, teacher

Robert James Berkeley Fleming (November 12, 1921 – November 28, 1976) was a Canadian composer, pianist, organist, choirmaster and teacher.

Robert was born in Prince Albert, Saskatchewan. At a young age his family settled in Saskatoon where he first studied with his mother. Between 1937 and 1939 he studied under Arthur Benjamin, and Herbert Howells in England at the RCM.

When he returned to Saskatoon he taught piano before making his formal debut in 1940 at Darke Hall in Regina and later toured Saskatchewan as a recitalist. While studying piano with Lyell Gustin in 1941-2 he became the assistant organist at the Church of St Alban the Martyr in Saskatoon. In 1941 and 1945 he attended The Royal Conservatory of Music (RCM), to which in later years he contributed music.

While at RCM he studied under Healey Willan for composition, Norman Wilks for piano, Ettore Mazzoleni for conducting, and John Weatherseed and Frederick Silvester for Organ. Between 1945 and 1946 he taught at Upper Canada College before joining the National Film Board, where he worked in Ottawa and Montreal as a staff composer between 1946 and 1958 before becoming music director between 1958 and 1970.

Between those years he was music director for the Ottawa Ballet Festival in 1953 and organist-choirmaster at Glebe United Church in 1954 and at St George's Anglican Church in Sainte-Anne-de-Bellevue, Quebec.

In 1970 he and his family moved back to Ottawa, where he taught 20th-century music and Canadian composers at Carleton University. In 1972 he became the organist-choirmaster at St Matthias' Anglican Church in Ottawa (Westboro). He died November 28, 1976.

== Works ==
Through his career Robert contributed music to well over 200 film scores including the Canada at War series and the Oscar-nominated 1953 short documentary, Herring Hunt.

- Bella Bella Sonatina for Violin and Piano (1943)
- Sonatina for Piano (1943)
- Coulter Songs (1946-54)
- Three Dialogues for Oboe and Piano (1964)
- Song cycle for Mezzo-Soprano The Confession Stone (1966)
- Hexad for Orchestra (1972)
- Divertimento (1975)

== Robert Fleming Prize ==
In his memory, the Canada Council for the Arts awards the Robert Fleming Prize annually to encourage the careers of young creators of music including André Lamarche (1979), Denys Bouliane (1980), Anthony Genge (1981), Denis Dion (1983), Guy Perron (1986) and Jacques Tremblay (1991). The current recipient is Melody McKiver (2020). Another Robert Fleming Award is presented by the Ottawa Music Festival Association.

== See also ==
- Music of Canada
- List of Canadian composers
