= Henri Letondal =

French-Canadian actor, playwright, and musician

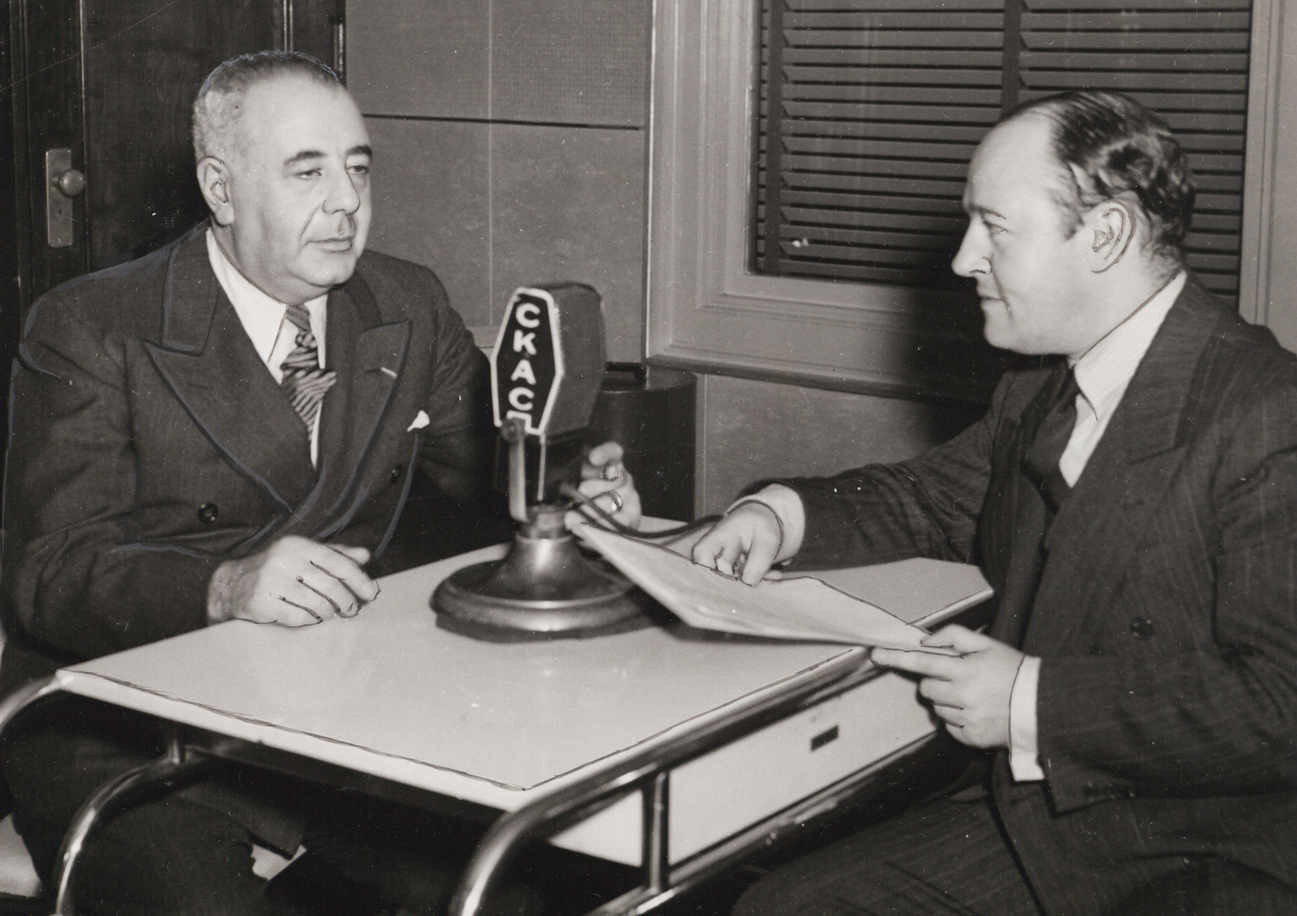
- Henri Letondal (right) at CKAC
- Born: 29 June 1901; Montreal, Quebec, Canada
- Died: 15 February 1955 (aged 53); Hollywood, California, US
- Occupations: playwright; actor; critic

Henri Letondal (29 June 1901 – 15 February 1955) was a French-Canadian actor, critic, playwright and musician.

== Life and career ==
The son of pianist Arthur Letondal and grandson of pianist Paul Letondal, Henri Letondal was born in Montreal on 29 June 1901. He was educated by the Jesuits at the Collège Sainte-Marie de Montréal and the College d'Edmonton in Alberta. He trained as a cellist with Gustave Labelle and Jean-Baptiste Dubois. He became interested in film during a trip to Paris which led to work as film critic and journalist. He became a music and theatre critic for La Patrie in c. 1920, and later severed as that paper's foreign correspondent in Paris from 1926 to 1929.

Letondal served as artistic director of the radio program L'Heure provinciale which was broadcast by CKAC. Other CKAC radio programs he oversaw included Histories d'amour, Capitaine Bravo, and Les Deux Copains. Late in life he had a career as a character actor in American cinema; moving to Hollywood in 1946.

He died in Hollywood on 15 February 1955.

== Filmography ==
Year	Title	Role	Notes
1946	The Razor's Edge	Police Inspector at Sophie's Death	Uncredited
1946	Magnificent Doll	Count D'Arignon	
1947	La Forteresse	Edward Durant	
1947	The Foxes of Harrow	Maspero	Uncredited
1947	The Crime Doctor's Gamble	Louis Chabonet	
1948	The Big Clock	Antique Dealer	
1948	Apartment for Peggy	Prof. Roland Pavin	Uncredited
1949	Mother Is a Freshman	Prof. Romaine	Uncredited
1949	Come to the Stable	Father Barraud	Uncredited
1949	Madame Bovary	Guillaumin	
1950	Please Believe Me	Jacques Carnet	
1951	Royal Wedding	Purser	Uncredited
1951	On the Riviera	Louis Foral	
1951	Kind Lady	Monsieur Malaquaise	
1951	Across the Wide Missouri	Lucien Chennault	Uncredited
1951	Ten Tall Men	Administrator	Uncredited
1952	The Wild North	John Mudd	Uncredited
1952	Lovely to Look At	Creditor	Uncredited
1952	What Price Glory	Cognac Pete	
1952	The Big Sky	La Badie	
1952	Monkey Business	Dr. Jerome Kitzel	
1953	Desert Legion	General	Uncredited
1953	South Sea Woman	Alphonse	
1953	Dangerous When Wet	Joubert	
1953	Gentlemen Prefer Blondes	Grotier	Uncredited
1953	Little Boy Lost	Tracing Service Clerk	
1954	Yankee Pasha	Clerk	Uncredited
1954	The Gambler from Natchez	Robert Renard	
1954	Deep in My Heart	François	Uncredited
1955	A Bullet for Joey	Dubois	
