= Ovila Légaré =

Actor and singer from Quebec (1901–1978)

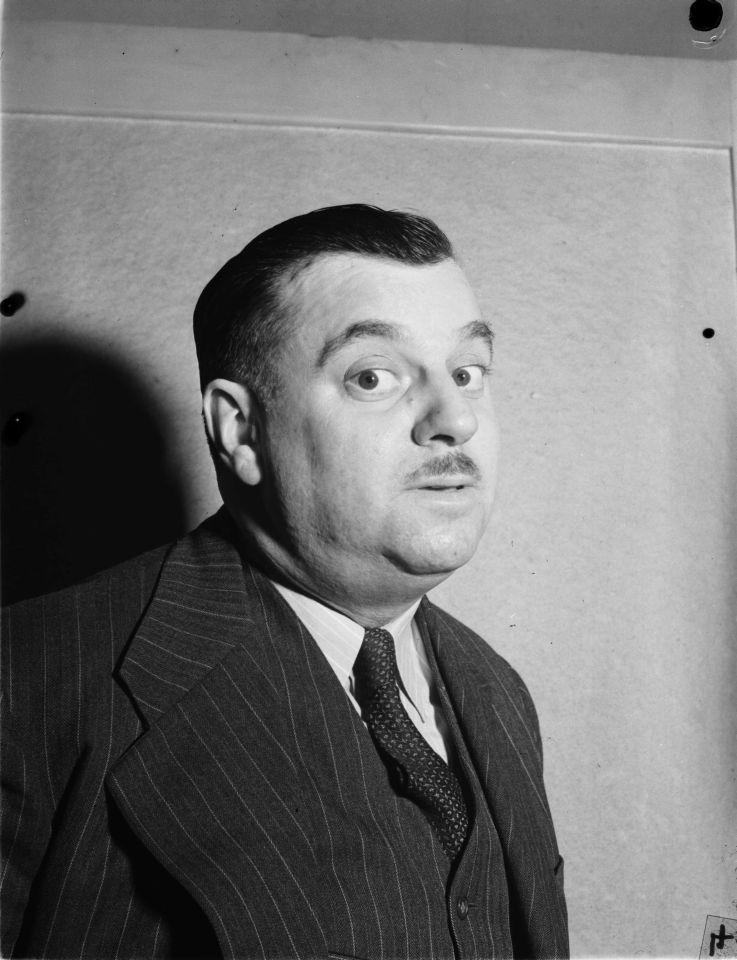
Ovila Légaré

Ovila Légaré (21 July 1901 - 19 February 1978) was a French-Canadian actor and singer from Quebec.

== Life ==
Légaré was born in Montreal on 21 July 1901, and died there on 19 February 1978.

== Career ==
He was a folklorist, singer, actor, script-writer, and host. Originally a violinist, he injured his hand in a printing accident and took up theatre and singing. He also had a number of significant roles on radio.

He starred in films including Footsteps in the Snow (1966) and on television, including Quentin Durgens, M.P.

== Filmography ==
Year	Title	Role	Notes
1945	The Music Master (Le Père Chopin)	Le curé	
1947	La forteresse	Detective	
1947	Whispering City	Detective	
1949	A Man and His Sin (Un homme et son péché)	Père Laloge	
1949	The Village Priest (Le Curé de village)	Le curé	
1951	The 13th Letter	Mayor	Uncredited
1952	The Nightingale and the Bells (Le Rossignol et les cloches)	Le restaurateur Antonio	
1953	I Confess	Monsieur Villette	Uncredited
1954	Operation Manhunt	Inspector Boucher	
1956	Que Dieu vous soit en aide		
1959	The Promised Land (Les brûlés)		
1961	Dubois et fils		
1964	The Luck of Ginger Coffey	Judge	
1966	La douzième heure	Le père Durand	
1966	Footsteps in the Snow	Sgt. Deschênes	
1970	The Awakening (L'amour humain)		
1972	Et du fils	François Godefroy	
