= Juliette Béliveau =

French Canadian actress and singer

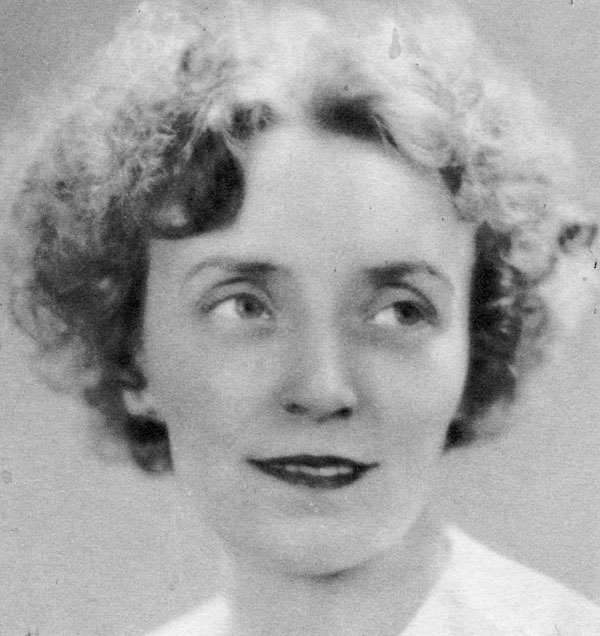
- Béliveau in the 1930s
- Born: October 28, 1889; Nicolet, Quebec
- Died: August 26, 1975; Montreal
- Occupation(s): Actress and Singer

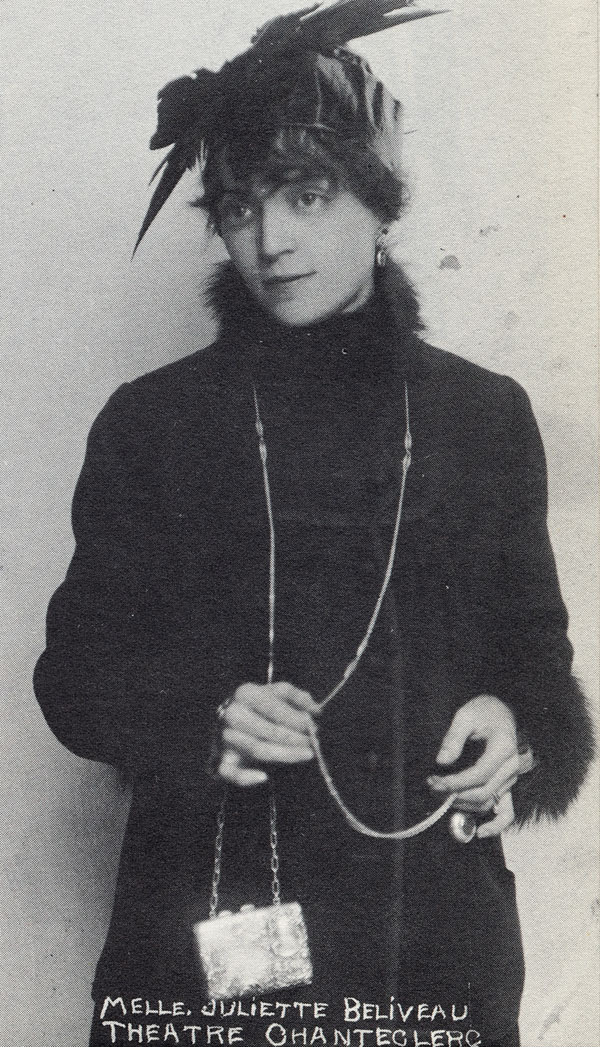
Juliette Béliveau in 1915

Juliette Béliveau (October 28, 1889 – August 26, 1975) was a French Canadian actress and singer, who starred in various radio and television comedies and dramas, as well as in theatre productions. She was also the heroine of a weekly comic strip drawn by Dick Lucas, published by Radiomonde from 1950 through 1954.

== Career ==
Born in Nicolet, Quebec, Béliveau's first public performance came at the age of ten, when she obtained a role in La Meunière performed at the Monument-National by Elzéar Roy's acting group Soirées de famille. It was here she was dubbed "la petite Sarah" by Louis-Honoré Fréchette, a reference to noted actress Sarah Bernhardt

Béliveau's second job came at age twelve, when she gained a part in La Case de l'oncle Tom which was performed by the acting company of Paul Cazeneuve at the Théâtre National. She went to study for a time at the Académie Marchand, before returning to the theatre in 1902 to play the role of Fanfan in La Famille Benoîton at Théâtre Les Nouveautés. She followed that by playing the title role in Véronica in 1903. In 1911, Béliveau took a job with the acting companies Conservatoire Lasalle and Nationascope. She married in 1916, and as a result appeared in significantly fewer performances.

In 1920, Béliveau signed with the Starr label, and recorded a variety of songs, as well as humorous skits with J. Hervey Germain, Elzéar Hamel, Alexandre Desmarteaux, Eugène Daigneault and Ovila Légaré. During the 1920s, she is believed to have starred in about one hundred plays at the Théâtre National. Her performance there in Fridolin led to Gratien Gélinas writing Fridolinades, which Béliveau would go on to co-star in with Juliette Huot.

In 1935 she made her radio debut in an adaptation of Honoré de Balzac's novel Le Curé de village on CKAC in 1935, a programme she would stay with until 1938. From 1937 until 1959 she was a cast member of Rue principale also aired on CKAC, and from 1939 until 1957 she was a cast member of Un homme et son péché on société Radio-Canada. Her popularity lead to her own radio show, Le Programme Juliette Béliveau which aired on CKAC from 1947 through 1950.

Béliveau appeared in her first movie role in 1949 in Un homme et son péché directed by Paul L'Anglais. She quickly landed several other roles, appearing in The Grand Bill (Le Gros Bill) in 1949, The Nightingale and the Bells (Le Rossignol et les cloches) in 1950 and Tit-Coq in 1952. Her performance as Aunt Clara in Tit-Coq won a Castor award for the best supporting role in Quebec cinema in 1953. Béliveau began appearing in television programmes in 1953 with a role in the soap opera La Famille Plouffe airing on Télévision de Radio-Canada.

Béliveau returned to theatre work in 1956 with a role in Sonnez les Matines. She would continue to work in theatre through the 1950s and 1960s, as well as on television until her death on August 26, 1975, in Montreal.

== Roles ==
=== Films ===
- The Grand Bill (Le Gros Bill) - 1949
- A Man and His Sin (Un homme et son péché) - 1949
- The Nightingale and the Bells (Le Rossignol et les cloches) - 1950
- Tit-Coq - 1952

=== Television ===
- La famille Plouffe (1953–1957)
- La feuille au vent (1953–1954)
- Toi et Moi (1954–1960)
- Les quat' fers en l'air (1954–1955)
- Grandville, P.Q. (1956)
- Les Belles Histoires des pays d'en haut (1956–1970)
- La Pension Velder (1957–1961)
- Sous le signe du lion (1961)
- Le pain du jour (1962–1965)
- Septième nord (1963–1967)
- Rue de l'anse (1963–1965)
- Rue des Pignons (1966–1977)

=== Theatre ===
- Un homme et son péché (1942–1953)
