= The Nightingale and the Bells =

1952 Canadian film directed by René Delacroix

- French: Le Rossignol et les cloches
- Directed by: René Delacroix
- Written by: Eugène Cloutier; Louis Morrisset; Joseph Schull
- Produced by: Richard J. Jarvis
- Starring: Gérard Barbeau; Clément Latour; Nicole Germain; Jean Coutu
- Cinematography: Akos Farkas; Roger Racine
- Edited by: Anton Van de Water
- Music by: Allan McIver
- Production company: Québec Productions
- Distributed by: France Film
- Release date: February 29, 1952
- Running time: 91 minutes
- Country: Canada
- Language: French

The Nightingale and the Bells (French: Le rossignol et les cloches) is a Canadian musical comedy-drama film, directed by René Delacroix and released in 1952. Considered an important landmark in the Cinema of Quebec, the film stars Gérard Barbeau as Guy Boyer, a young boy with both a penchant for getting into trouble and an exceptionally good singing voice, who is engaged by the local Roman Catholic priest (Clément Latour) to perform at a concert to raise funds for the church to acquire new bells.

The cast also includes Nicole Germain as Nicole Payette, a concert pianist who is asked to perform at the fundraising concert but is reluctant, and Jean Coutu as René, her impresario boyfriend, as well as Juliette Béliveau, Ovila Légaré, Roger Baulu and Juliette Huot in supporting roles.

The film was shot in Saint-Hyacinthe, Quebec, in 1951, and was released to theatres in early 1952.
