= The Village Priest (1949 film) =

1949 film by Paul Gury

- French: Le Curé de village
- Directed by: Paul Gury
- Written by: Robert Choquette
- Produced by: Paul L'Anglais
- Starring: Ovila Légaré; Paul Guèvremont; Lise Roy
- Cinematography: Roger Racine
- Edited by: Jean Boisvert
- Music by: Morris C. Davis
- Production company: Quebec Productions
- Distributed by: France Film
- Release date: November 11, 1949
- Running time: 89 minutes
- Country: Canada
- Language: French

The Village Priest (French: Le Curé de village) is a Canadian drama film, directed by Paul Gury and released in 1949. The film stars Ovila Légaré as a smalltown Roman Catholic priest whose skills as a spiritual and moral leader of the community are tested when Leblanc (Paul Guèvremont), a criminal fugitive originally from the town, returns home to see his estranged daughter Juliette (Lise Roy) on the eve of her wedding to Lionel Théberge (Denis Drouin).

The cast also includes Camille Ducharme, Guy Mauffette, Jeannette Teasdale, Eugène Daigneault, Blanche Gauthier, Jeanne Quintal, Arthur Groulx, Fannie Tremblay and Juliette Huot.

The film was written by Robert Choquette as an adaptation of his own 1930s CKAC radio serial Le Curé de village.

The film was screened in competition for the 2nd Canadian Film Awards in 1950. The film itself was not named Best Picture, but Quebec Productions, the studio of producer Paul L'Anglais and his business partner René Germain, received a special citation "for sustained and creative effort in establishing a feature-length film industry in Canada", collectively based on the films The Village Priest, Whispering City/La Forteresse, A Man and His Sin (Un homme et son péché) and Séraphin.

Quebec film historian Pierre Véronneau later characterized The Village Priest, A Man and His Sin and Séraphin as a group of films about "cowboys in cassocks", which transplanted some of the heroic tropes of Western films onto priests in the church-dominated society of pre-Quiet Revolution Quebec.
