= Paul Gury =

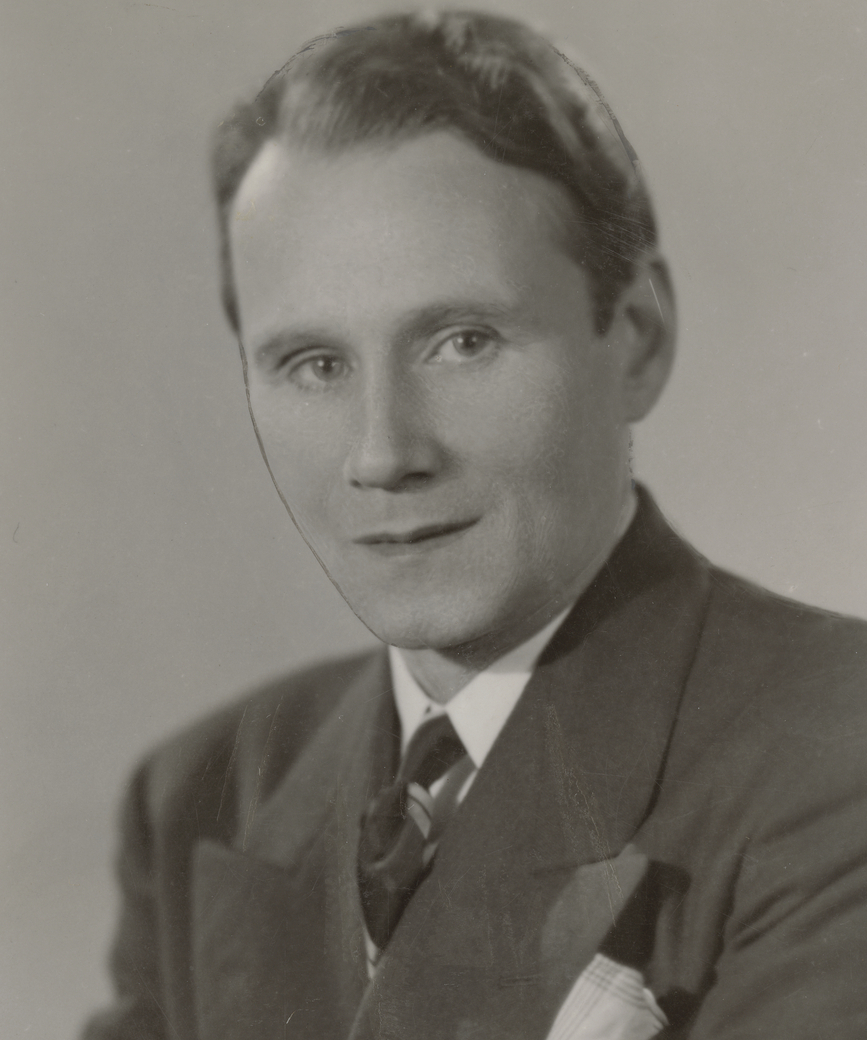
- Born: Louis-Marie Le Gouriadec; May 11, 1888; Vannes, Morbihan, France
- Died: November 13, 1974 (aged 86); Montreal, Quebec, Canada
- Occupations: film and theatre writer, director and actor
- Spouse: Yvette Brind'Amour
- Writing career
- Period: 1920s–1960s

Louis-Marie "Loïc" Le Gouriadec (May 11, 1888 – November 13, 1974), known professionally as Paul Gury, was a French-Canadian film and theatre actor, director and writer. He was most noted as the director of three significant films in the early Cinema of Quebec.

== Career ==
Born in Vannes, Morbihan, France, he emigrated to Montreal, Quebec in 1907, and studied dramatic arts at the Conservatoire Lassalle. In 1918, he became director of Montreal's Théâtre National. He wrote or cowrote a number of stage plays during this era, including Le Mortel baiser, L'Homme au foulard blanc, Les Dopés, Les Esclaves blanches and a theatrical adaptation of Louis Hémon's novel Maria Chapdelaine. He remained with the theatre until 1936, when he was succeeded as director by Rose Ouellette.

In the 1930s, he began working in film, with acting and screenwriting credits in several French films, and in broadcasting as a writer of radio dramas for CKVL, CKAC and Radio-Canada. His noted radio dramas included La Fiancée du commando and Le procès du fils de l’homme.

He was hired by producer Paul L'Anglais to direct A Man and His Sin, the 1949 film adaptation of Claude-Henri Grignon's novel Un homme et son péché. In the same year he also directed The Village Priest (Le Curé de village), and in 1950 he released Séraphin, a sequel to A Man and His Sin.

He had occasional acting roles thereafter, including in stage productions of Jean Anouilh's The Lark and Maurice Gagnon's Edwige, and continued to write for radio into the 1960s, including the dramatic serials Vies de femmes and L'Hirondelle du faubourg.

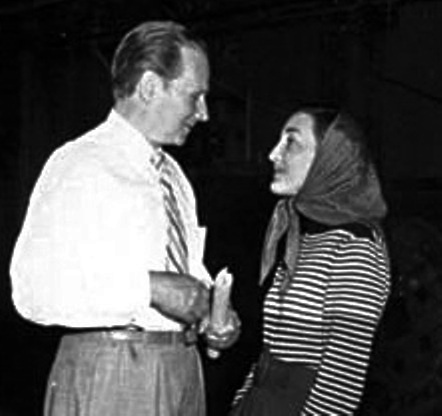

Throughout his career, he was credited as Paul Gury when acting or directing, but used his real name in writing credits.

== Personal life ==
He was married to actress Yvette Brind'Amour, with whom he participated in the creation of her theatre company Théâtre du Rideau Vert in 1949.

== Filmography ==
Year	Title	Role	Notes
1931	La Prison en folie		
1935	Debout là-dedans!	Le surveillant général	
1936	Death on the Run (Le Mort en fuite)	Ivan	Also writer
1936	Moutonnet		
1937	Le cantinier de la coloniale		
1938	My Father and My Daddy (Mon père et mon papa)	Le colonial	Also writer
1938	Escadrille of Chance (L'escadrille de la chance)		Writer
1949	A Man and His Sin (Un homme et son péché)		Director, writer
1949	The Village Priest (Le Curé de village)		Director
1950	Séraphin		Director, writer
1952	Run Away Mr. Perle (La Fugue de Monsieur Perle)		Writer
1954	Death on the Run (Les deux font la paire)		Writer
1959	Ouragan	Dr. Léonard Morin	TV series
1966	Chacun son amour		
