= Claude-Henri Grignon =

French-Canadian novelist, journalist and politician

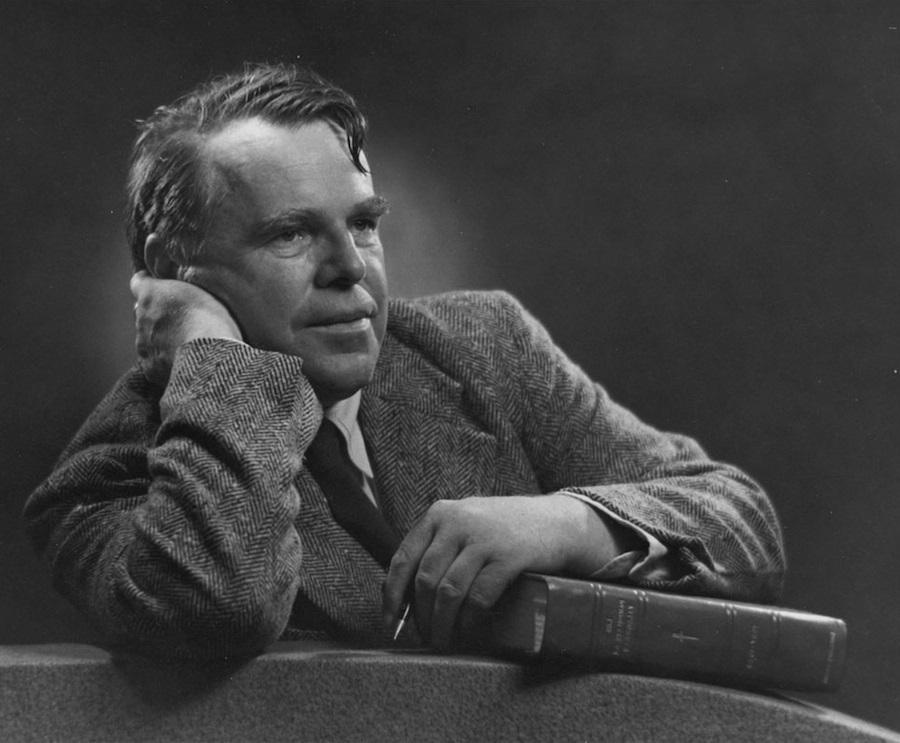
- Born: July 8, 1894; Sainte-Adèle, Quebec, Canada
- Died: April 3, 1976 (aged 81); Sainte-Adèle, Quebec, Canada
- Occupations: novelist, critic, radio and television writer
- Writing career
- Period: 1920s-1960s
- Notable works: Le Secret de Lindbergh, Un Homme et son péché, Les Belles Histoires des pays d'en haut

Claude-Henri Grignon, OC, FRSC (July 8, 1894 – April 3, 1976) was a French-Canadian novelist, journalist and politician, best known for his 1933 novel Un Homme et son péché.

== Early life ==
Grignon was born in Sainte-Adèle, Quebec. He was a cousin of writer Germaine Guèvremont.

== Career ==
Grignon began working as a journalist in 1916, writing for a number of publications in Quebec, including La Minerve, Le Matin, Le Canada, Le Petit Journal, La Revue populaire, La Renaissance and Bataille. He published his debut novel, Le Secret de Lindbergh, in 1929. His second novel, Un Homme et son péché, was published in 1933. A tale of a man whose greed leads to the death of his wife, the book broke with Quebec's literary conventions of the time by satirizing rather than glorifying life in rural Quebec, and came to be recognized as one of Quebec's early modernist novels. By contrast, Guèvremont's novels in the same period continued to follow Quebec's more traditionalist romans du terroir style.

Grignon released the short story collection Le Déserteur et autres récits de la terre in 1934. As well, he wrote literary and political criticism, including Les Vivants et les autres and Ombres et Clameurs. In his work Les Pamphlets de Valdombre, a trenchant satire of the government of Maurice Duplessis, Grignon advanced the theory that publisher and literary critic Louis Dantin was the real author of the poetry of Émile Nelligan; although the claim was widely derided and denied by Dantin himself, it was later readvanced by literary historian Yvette Francoli in her 2013 book Le naufragé du Vaisseau d'or.

He subsequently wrote a serial radio dramatization of Un Homme et son péché, as well as the television adaptation Les Belles Histoires des pays d'en haut. The novel has also been adapted as a film three times, including 1949's A Man and His Sin, the 1950 sequel Séraphin, and 2002's Séraphin: Heart of Stone (Séraphin: un homme et son péché), as well as the 2016-21 television series Les Pays d'en haut.

Grignon later served as mayor of Sainte-Adèle from 1941 to 1951. For a time he was the literary editor of the Clarion-Montréal newspaper.

Grignon's papers have been collected and preserved at the Bibliothèque et Archives nationales du Québec.

== Works ==
- 1922 - Les Vivants et les autres
- 1929 - Le Secret de Lindbergh
- 1933 - Ombres et Clameurs
- 1933 - Un homme et son péché
- 1934 - Le Déserteur et autres récits de la terre
- 1935 - Précisions sur « Un homme et son péché »
- 1936 - Les Pamphlets de Valdombre

== See also ==
- Village de Séraphin
