= Janine Sutto =

Canadian actress (1921–2017)

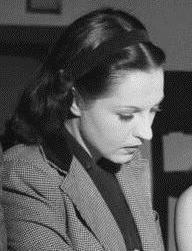
- Sutto prepares for the radio play Les secrets du docteur Morhanges, 1945.
- Born: 20 April 1921; Paris, France
- Died: 28 March 2017 (aged 95); Montreal, Quebec, Canada
- Occupation: Actress
- Years active: 1945–2012
- Children: 2
- Awards: Order of Canada, Ordre des Arts et des Lettres, National Order of Quebec

Janine Sutto, CC CQ (20 April 1921 – 28 March 2017) was a French-born Canadian actress and comedian.

== Career ==
Born in Paris to Léopold Sutto and Renée Mamert, she emigrated to Canada in 1930, with her family settling in Montreal.

At age 14, Sutto began acting in radio dramas, and later performed stage roles. In 1943, she was a founding member of the Théâtre de l'Equipe troupe, and she continued acting on stage through the early 1950s with Théâtre du Nouveau Monde. She also made over 75 film and television appearances, with her first film appearance being in the 1945 film The Music Master (Le Père Chopin).

In 1968, Janine Sutto participated in the creation of Les Belles-sœurs by Michel Tremblay, playing Lisette de Courval. In 2010, she created the musical Belles-Sœurs, this time playing Olivine Dubuc; the show had a wide reach in Quebec as well as at the Théâtre du Rond-Point, in Paris, in 2012.

Alongside her numerous theater roles, she was active on television throughout her career. We also remember her in the television novels Joie de vivre, Septième nord and, most famously, Symphorien, where she played Miss Berthe L'Espérance alongside Gilles Latulippe. She also found him on Radio-Canada Television in the series Poivre et Sel. Janine Sutto played in an impressive number of Quebec TV series and films.

== Personal life ==
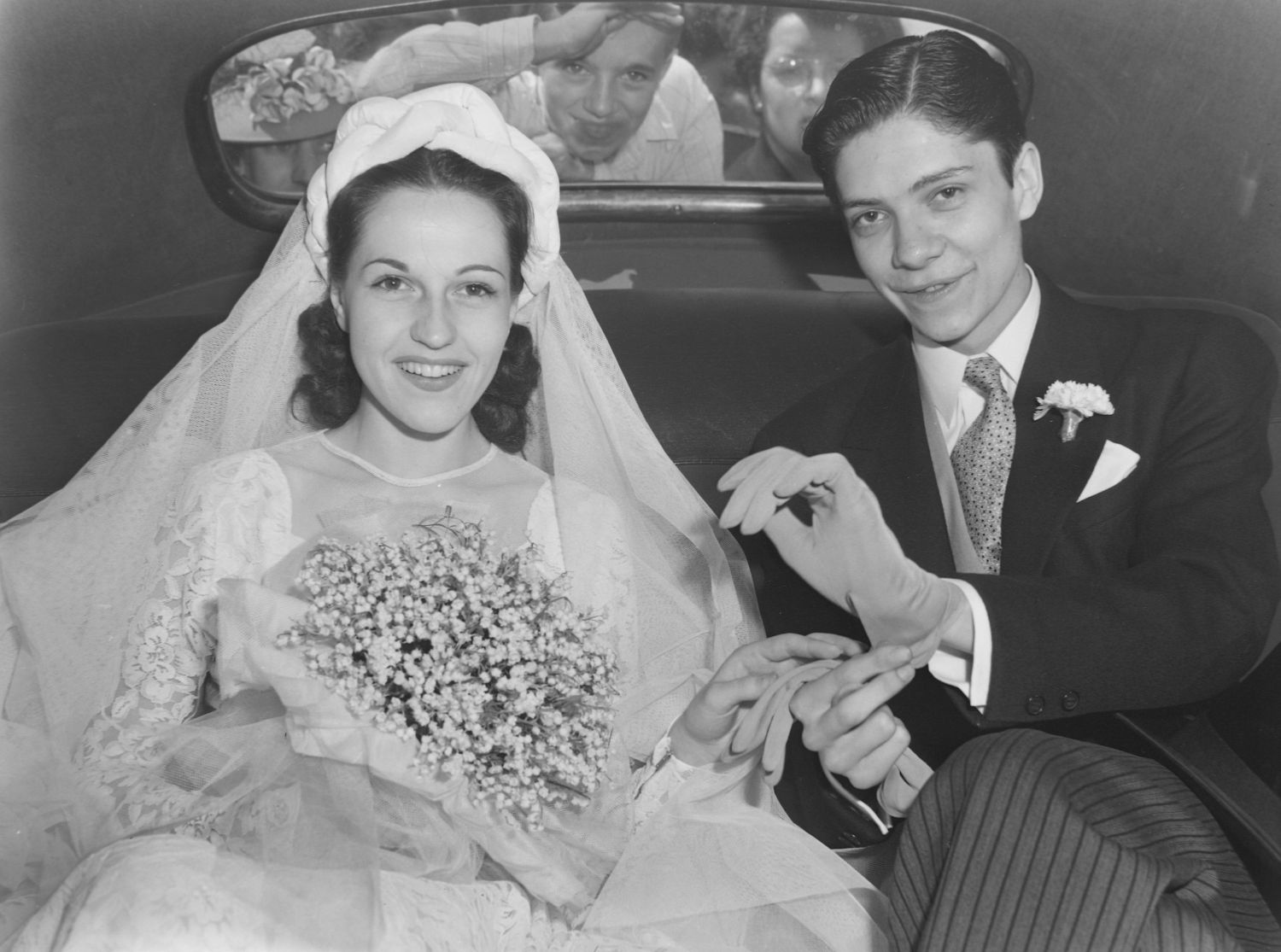
Wedding of Janine Sutto and Pierre Dagenais, 1944

She married fellow comic actor Pierre Dagenais in 1944. They had twin daughters: Mirelle and Catherine, born on September 22, 1958. Catherine had Down syndrome. Catherine died in April 2011.

Her biography, titled Vivre avec le destin (Living with Destiny), written by her son-in-law Jean-François Lépine, was published in 2010.

Sutto died in a Montreal palliative care facility in March 2017 at age 95, as reported by Lépine.

== Honours ==
In 1986 she was made an Officer of the Order of Canada and was promoted to Companion in 1991. In 1998, she was made a Knight of the National Order of Quebec. It is the highest honor in the performing arts in Canada. In May 2014, Sutto received a Governor General's Performing Arts Award for Lifetime Artistic Achievement for her contribution to Canadian theatre.

In April 2015, she was the first woman to receive the title of Honorary Citizen of the City of Montreal. On October 5, 2016, she attended the unveiling of a mural in her honor created by the artist Kevin Ledo in the Ville-Marie borough, in Montreal. produced by the charity MU, located in South-Central Montreal, a neighborhood that Janine Sutto lived in as a child. The Maison de la Culture Frontenac was renamed Maison de la Culture Janine-Sutto in November 2018.
