= Herring Hunt =

1953 film by Julian Biggs

- Directed by: Julian Biggs
- Written by: Leslie McFarlane
- Produced by: Guy Glover
- Starring: Bruno Gerussi
- Cinematography: Walter Sutton
- Edited by: David Mayerovitch
- Music by: Robert Fleming
- Distributed by: National Film Board of Canada
- Release date: 1953
- Running time: 10:47 minutes
- Country: Canada
- Languages: English; French

Herring Hunt (Les Harenguiers) is a 1953 short documentary film directed by Julian Biggs and produced by the National Film Board of Canada (NFB).

The film tells the story of the fishing trawler Western Girl, and her captain and crew. Western Girl is typical of the ships that fished the coastal waters of British Columbia, and Herring Hunt follows the skipper and his men in their race to get their catch before the quota is taken and the fishing area closed for the season. We see the cooperation necessary in a job that's extremely hard work and full of risk; there is big money to be made in herring when the catch is good, but the cash outlay required is equally large and one man's error can lead to a heavy loss for the boat's owner.

Herring Hunt was part of the NFB's Canada Carries On series, which was meant to propagate Canadian ideals of democracy and promote the Canadian image abroad. The films in this series had larger budgets than most, and some of the documentaries included dramatization. Herring Hunt is one such documentary; the skipper is played by the actor Bruno Gerussi.

Herring Hunt was nominated for the Academy Award for Best Live Action Short Film (One-Reel) at the 26th Academy Awards.

It was also awarded a special mention at the 6th Canadian Film Awards, and a Second Award in the Agricultural and Industrial films category at the 1954 Yorkton Film Festival.

== See also ==
- The Rising Tide, a 1949 NFB short documentary about fishing cooperatives in Canada's maritime provinces
- Netz über Bord – Heringsfang auf der Nordsee, a 1955 West German documentary film about the herring industry
