= Perpetual Movement =

- French: Mouvement perpétuel
- Directed by: Claude Jutra
- Screenplay by: Claude Jutras
- Cinematography: Michel Brault
- Release date: 1949
- Running time: 15 min
- Country: Canada
- Language: French

Perpetual Movement (French: Mouvement perpétuel) is a Canadian short film, written and directed by Claude Jutra and released in 1949. The film won the Canadian Film Award for Best Amateur Film in 1950.

== Synopsis ==
An experimental short film shot in slow motion and set to Ottokar Nováček's violin composition Perpetuum mobile, the film depicts a love triangle between two men and a woman. It takes significant risks for its era, including portraying the woman as an autonomous sexual being who freely expresses her own desires and depicting subtle but not fully explicit suggestions of homoerotic desire between the two men.

== Cast ==
- Sylvia Laroche as She
- Jacques Brault as He
- Jean-Jacques Pinealut as The Other

== Background ==
In Peter Rist's 2001 Guide to the Cinema(s) of Canada, the film is linked to the contemporaneous Refus Global manifesto of opposition to the staid traditionalism of Quebec's arts scene in the era, although Jutra was not himself a signatory on the original document.

Jutra described his film as a "formalist, impressionist film; a sponge, saturated with all the influences: the French classics of the thirties, the American moderns, Buñuel, Maya Deren; total madness."

== Reception ==
Author André Loisellea called it a "playful experiment in avant-gardist cinema." Film critic Thomas Waugh wrote that "the film vibrates not only with precocious cinephile aesthetcism but also with intense and conflicted undercurrents of homoerotic desire — whether conscious or unconscious, we may never know."

== Accolades ==
Jutra was just eighteen years old when the film won the Canadian Film Award for Best Amateur Film in 1950, and led to Norman McLaren extending Jutra a job offer to work for the National Film Board. Author Maria Topalovich opined that "an unknown French-Canadian filmmaker riveted the judges attention with the film; distinctive for its superb blend of old and new visual techniques coupled with an unusual sound track, the film was unanimously selected as the winning entry."

== See also ==
- Cinema of Canada
- Experimental film
- List of Canadian films of the 1940s
- List of LGBTQ-related films of the 1940s
