= Anne-Marie Sicotte =

Anne-Marie Sicotte (born 1962) is a writer in Quebec, Canada.

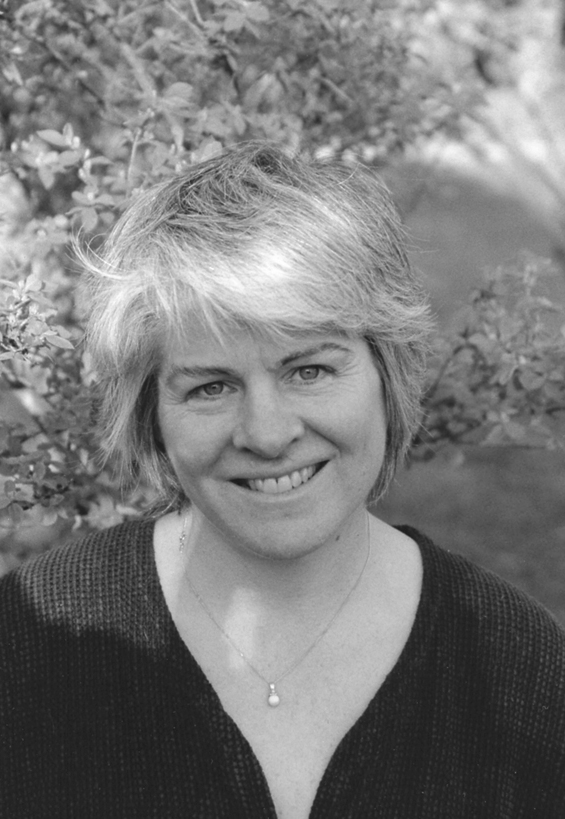
Anne-Marie Sicotte, historian and author from Quebec, Canada

The daughter of Sylvie Gélinas, she was born in Montreal. Her maternal grandfather was Gratien Gélinas. Sicotte received a bachelor's degree in history and anthropology. She was editor in chief for L'Éclusier, a monthly publication dealing with the history of the Lachine Canal. She published De la vapeur au vélo : le guide du canal de Lachine for Parks Canada in 1986. She then worked as journalist and editor for various publications. From 1995 to 1996, she published a two-volume biography of her grandfather Gratien Gélinas - la ferveur et le doute. In 2005, she published Marie-Gérin Lajoie, Conquérante de la liberté.

In 1992, she won first prize in the annual contest sponsored by Voir magazine for her contribution to the collection of stories Circonstances particulières.

== Selected works ==
- Gratien Gélinas : du naïf Fridolin à l'ombrageux Tit-Coq, biography (2001)
- Justice Lacoste Beaubien. Au secours des enfants malades, biography (2002)
- Les accoucheuses, trilogy (2006–2008)
- Le pays insoumis, novel (2011)
- Les tuques bleues, novel (2014)
- Histoire inédite des patriotes. Un peuple libre en images, history (2016)
