= The Music Master (1945 film) =

1945 film by Fedor Ozep

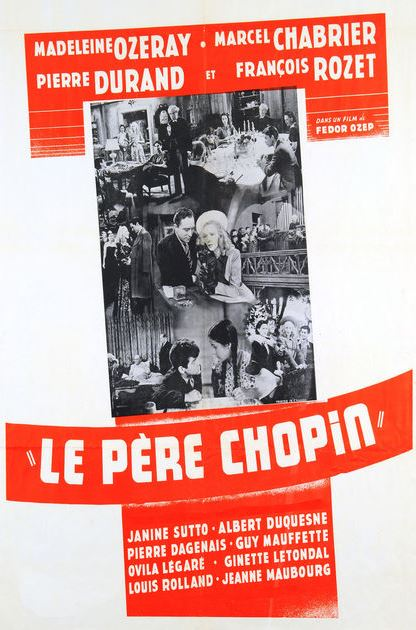
- Theatrical release poster
- French: Le Père Chopin
- Directed by: Fedor Ozep
- Written by: Bella Daniel; Jean Desprez
- Produced by: Charles Philipp
- Starring: Madeleine Ozeray; Marcel Chabrier; Pierre Durand; François Rozet
- Cinematography: Don Malkames
- Edited by: Georges Freedland
- Music by: Rudolph Goehr
- Production company: Renaissance Films
- Release date: April 19, 1945
- Running time: 108 minutes
- Country: Canada
- Language: French
- Budget: $250,000

The Music Master (French: Le Père Chopin) is a Canadian drama film, directed by Fedor Ozep and released in 1945. The first full-length feature film ever produced by a commercial studio in Quebec and the first film in Canada's post-World War II "boom" in filmmaking, the film's main characters are estranged brothers Paul (Marcel Chabrier) and Pierre (Pierre Durand) Dupont, who emigrated to Quebec from France in their youth; Paul has grown up to be a church organist, of modest means but beloved by his family and community, while Pierre has become a wealthy businessman, but is unmarried and isolated. The film's plot centres on their reunion for the first time since going their separate ways to pursue their different dreams.

The cast also includes Madeleine Ozeray, Janine Sutto, Guy Mauffette, Pierre Dagenais, François Rozet, Ginette Letondal, Albert Duquesne, Ovila Légaré, Louis Rolland, J. Léo Gagnon, Paul Guèvremont, Jeanne Maubourg, Fannie Tremblay, Lise Roy, Jean Lajeunesse, Conrad Gauthier and Roland D'Amour.

The film premiered on April 14, 1945 at the Théâtre Saint-Denis in Montreal. Although well-received, the film did face some minor criticism for the fact that its dialogue was spoken in a Continental French rather than a Quebec French accent.

Joseph-Alexandre DeSève purchased Renaissance Films following the success of the film.

== Production ==
The film had a budget of $250,000 (equivalent to $4,461,957 in 2025).

== Works cited ==
- Melnyk, George (2004). One Hundred Years of Canadian Cinema. University of Toronto Press. ISBN 0-8020-3568-X – via Internet Archive.
- Pratley, Gerald (2003). A Century of Canadian Cinema. Toronto: Lynx Images. ISBN 1-894073-21-5 – via Internet Archive.
