= Nicole Germain =

Canadian actress and journalist

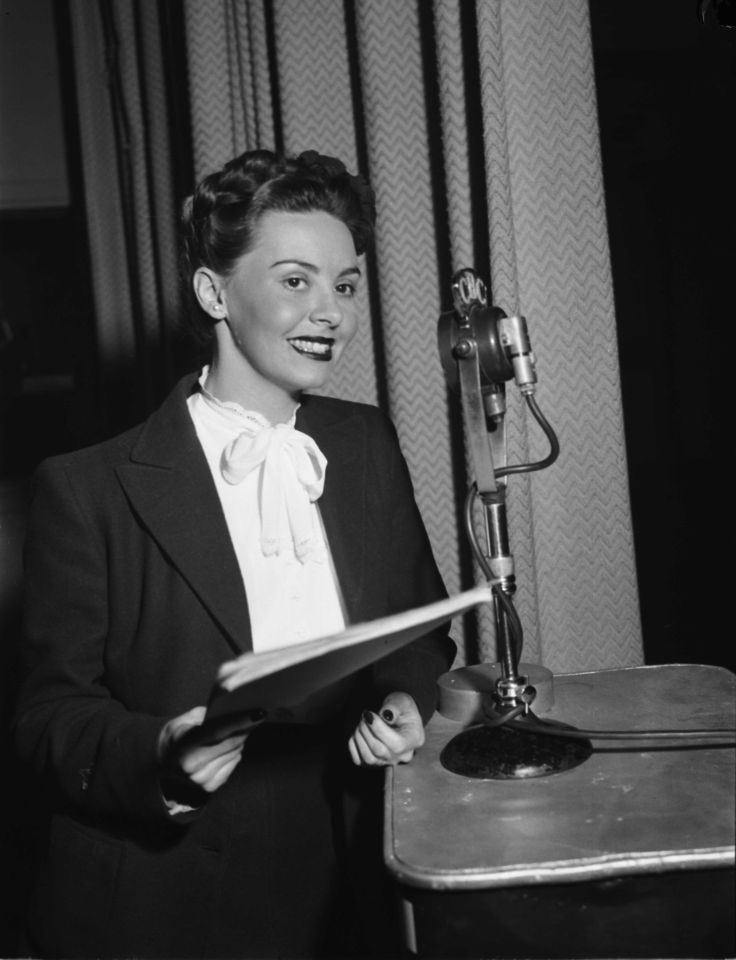
Nicole Germain in 1946

Nicole Germain, C.M. (born Marcelle Landreau; November 29, 1917 – February 11, 1994) was a Canadian actress in Quebec radio and film in the 1940s and 1950s and later as a journalist. In 1974, she was named a member of the Order of Canada.

== Personal life ==
Germain was born Marcelle Landreau. Her father was George Landreau, director of the Montreal Conservatory. She was also niece to Chief Justice Rinfret. She studied at the LaSalle Conservatory. Her daughter is Liette Desjardins.

== Career ==
Germain began acting in radio in 1939 and became so popular she was voted the French Canadian "Miss Radio 1946".

Success in radio led Germain to a role starring in the French version, La Fortresse, of the 1947 film Whispering City which is notable as one of the earliest attempts of a Canadian film to break into the U.S. market. The film, popular in Quebec, the English version failed to find an audience, either in the United States or Canada.

In 1949, she played Donalda in A Man and His Sin, the film adaptation of Claude-Henri Grignon's novel Un homme et son péché, followed by the film Séraphin a year later. In 1952, she played a concert pianist in The Nightingale and the Bells (Le rossignol et les cloches). She then had a long career as a television journalist and moderator. She was a panelist on the 1950s Quebec version of What's My Line?, Chacun son Metier. In 1955 she appeared as a contestant on the American What's My Line? (Episode #242), first as a contestant, then joining the panel next to Bennett Cerf.

She was co-chairman of the 1960 Christmas Gift Campaign for the Quebec Division of the Canadian Mental Health Association which raised gifts for Quebec's hospitalized mentally ill.

At a conference on the French language held at the Menton, France in 1971, Germain urged the creation of an organization to find substitute French words when new English words are created.

== Awards and honours ==
In 1974 Nicole Germain was named a Member of the Order of Canada for her efforts to promote the French language.
