= Jean-Yves Bigras =

Canadian film director and screenwriter

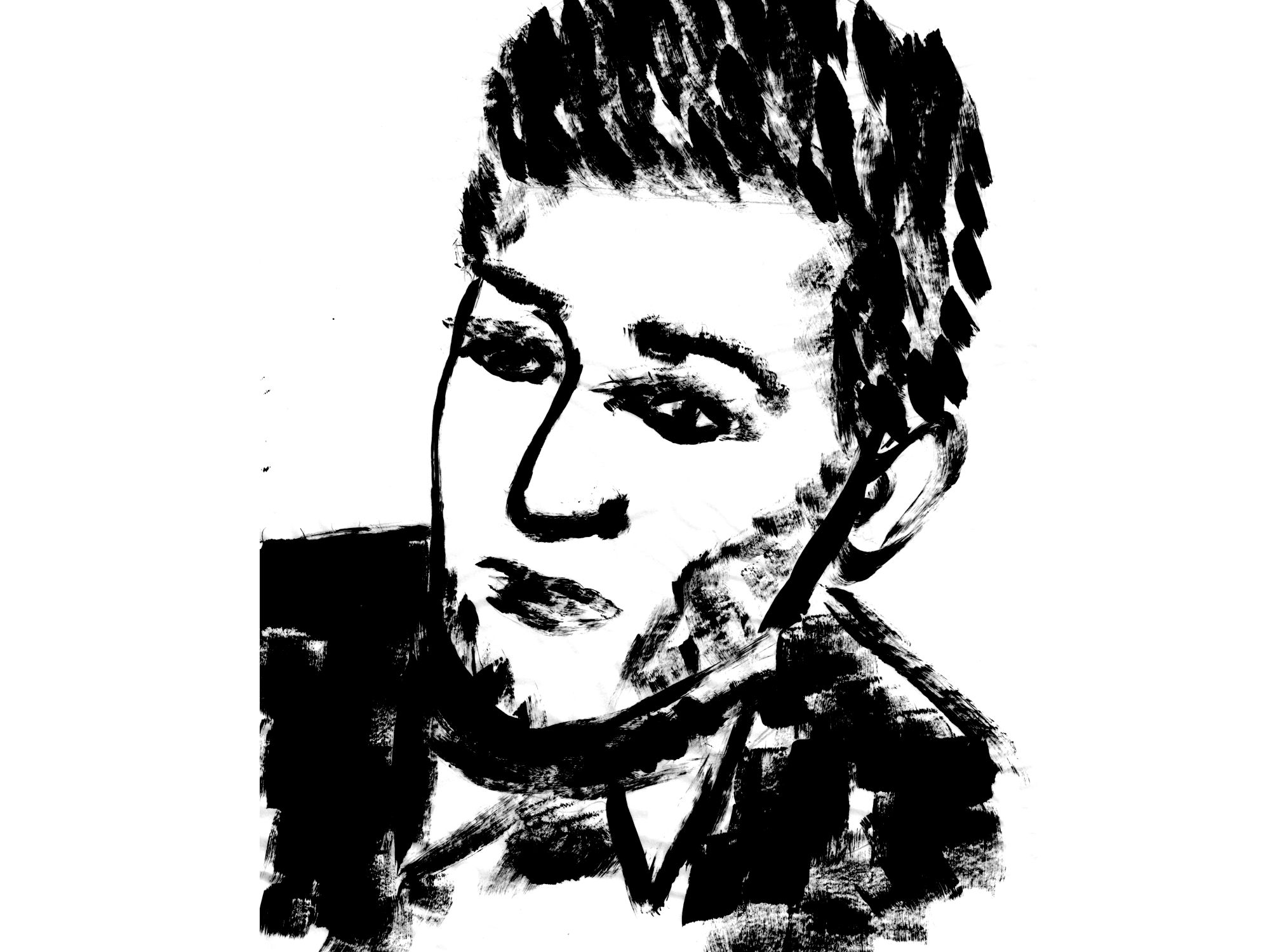
- Portrait of Jean-Yves Bigras by François Charbonnier
- Born: May 19, 1919; Ottawa, Ontario, Canada
- Died: 17 August 1966 (aged 47); Montreal, Quebec, Canada
- Occupations: Film director Film editor Screenwriter; Film producer
- Years active: 1943 – 1962

Jean-Yves Bigras (May 19, 1919 – August 17, 1966) was a Canadian film director and film editor, considered a pioneer in Quebec cinema. Bigras studied first at the University of Ottawa and then at Queen's University. From 1939 to 1942, he served in World War II as part of the RCAF. When he returned to Canada, he became one of the first French Canadians to be hired by the NFB and worked there as an editor until 1948. He was then hired to work in Renaissance Éducationnel, the children's education film section of Renaissance Films Distribution. It was here that he got to work on his first feature film, Le gros Bill (1949), co-directing with René Delacroix. Bigras moved on to direct three feature films himself, including La petite Aurore l’enfant martyre (1951), a big hit with audiences and a staple of Quebec Cinema. In 1953, he began working for Radio-Canada where he became one of its principal directors until his death in 1966.

== Selected filmography ==
- The Grand Bill (Le gros Bill) – 1949, co-directed with René Delacroix
- Lights of My City (Les lumières de ma ville) – 1950
- Little Aurore's Tragedy (La petite Aurore, l’enfant martyre) – 1951
- The Spirit of Evil (L'esprit du mal) – 1954
