= Whispering City =

1947 film by Fedor Ozep

- Theatrical release poster
- Directed by: Fedor Ozep
- Screenplay by: Rian James; Leonard Lee
- Story by: Michael Lennox and George Zuckerman
- Produced by: George Marton; Paul L'Anglais (exec.)
- Starring: Paul Lukas; Mary Anderson; Helmut Dantine
- Cinematography: Guy Roe; William O. Steiner
- Edited by: Leonard Anderson; W.L. Bagier; Richard J. Jarvis
- Music by: Morris Davis
- Production company: Quebec Productions
- Distributed by: Eagle-Lion Films
- Release date: November 20, 1947 (United States)
- Running time: 98 minutes
- Country: Canada
- Language: English
- Budget: 750,000 (estimated) CAD $680,000

Whispering City (also known as Crime City) is a 1947 Canadian black-and-white film noir directed by Fedor Ozep and starring Paul Lukas, Mary Anderson, and Helmut Dantine. It was filmed on location in Quebec City and Montmorency Falls, Quebec, Canada in both English and French.

A French language version entitled La Forteresse, with different actors but with the same director, was made simultaneously.

== Plot ==
Taking place in Quebec City, the film tells the story of a lawyer and a patron of the arts, Albert Frédéric, who, earlier in life, caused a murder and made it look like an accident for financial gain.

Later in life, a dying woman tells a reporter the tale of how she thinks the accident was actually murder. The young American reporter, Mary Roberts, begins investigating the case, unaware that the charming lawyer may be behind it all. Meanwhile, Michel Lacoste, a classical composer, who is supported by Frédéric, is having marriage troubles. Finally his wife kills herself and leaves the husband a note. Frédéric sneaks into the apartment, takes the note and convinces the man that he killed her in a drunken rage.

Michel, whose night was indeed blacked out by drink, can't remember anything. The lawyer then offers the composer a deal: kill reporter Mary Roberts in exchange for legal representation that will guarantee to get the younger man off the hook. The man, seeing no other choice, agrees reluctantly. The man and woman meet but he does not have the heart to kill her. The two begin to fall in love, gradually figure out that the lawyer is the real killer and set about a scheme to drive the lawyer into confessing to the crime.

== Cast ==
=== Whispering City ===
- Helmut Dantine as Michel Lacoste
- Mary Anderson as Mary Roberts
- Paul Lukas as Albert Frédéric
- John Pratt as Edward Durant, editor
- Mimi D'Estee as Renee Broncourt

=== La Forteresse ===
- Paul Dupuis as Michel Lacoste
- Nicole Germain as Marie Roberts
- Jacques Auger as Albert Frédéric
- Henri Letondal as Edward Durant
- Armande Lebrun as Renée Brancourt
- Lucie Poitras as Mother Superior
- Mimi D'Estée as Blanche Lacoste

== Production ==
Faced with the dilemma that the French market in Quebec was too small to support a self-sustaining film industry all by itself, while the language barrier between Quebec and the anglophone market in the rest of North America made it virtually impossible for a Quebec-produced film to pursue wider distribution, producer Paul L'Anglais tried to resolve the difficulty by producing Whispering City and La Forteresse as English and French versions of the same film. He opted to make the experiment a Hollywood-style thriller, set in the urban Quebec City market instead of the rural communities more typical of Quebec cinema in its era.

The film's $750,000 budget made it the most expensive film ever made in Canada as of that time, a title it retained until the early 1970s.

== Release ==
The film was seen by over 100,000 people in Quebec over six weeks and was shown in Paris for three weeks.

== Reception ==
Film critic Dennis Schwartz gave the film a mixed review, writing, "Watchable minor film noir, that is competently directed by Fyodor Otsep from a story by George Zuckerman and Michael Lennox. The acting by Paul Lukas and Helmut Dantine is far beyond what you would expect in such an inexpensive film. But the narrative has too many coincidental plot points to be believable, though the crisply told story is for the most part entertaining. The film is told in flashback by a tourist guide sleigh driver to two riders in Quebec City."

La Forteresse was more positively received in the Quebec market than Whispering City was among English audiences. Some critics who have viewed both films for comparison have asserted that La Forteresse is actually a better film, for various reasons including faster-paced editing and a greater expressiveness among the actors in the French cast; however, writer André Loiselle concluded that "what ultimately explains the success of La Forteresse and the failure of Whispering City are cultural rather than stylistic or aesthetic reasons. The former, as a French-Canadian thriller enjoyed the best of both worlds, as it capitalised on both the insular character of Quebec's culture and its status as merely another subdivision of Hollywood's domestic market. Whispering City on the other hand, suffered from the worst of both worlds as it proved to be neither a particularly good Hollywood film nor a distinctly Canadian work." Roly Young of The Globe and Mail reviewed both films together, rating Whispering City four stars but La Forteresse four-and-a-half, identifying the strength of Nicole Germain's performance as Marie in La Forteresse as the biggest distinction between the two.

At the 2nd Canadian Film Awards in 1950, Quebec Productions, the studio of producer L'Anglais and his business partner René Germain, received a special citation "for sustained and creative effort in establishing a feature-length film industry in Canada", collectively based on the films Whispering City/La Forteresse, A Man and His Sin, Séraphin and The Village Priest (Le Curé du village).

Whispering City was later screened at the 1984 Festival of Festivals as part of Front & Centre, a special retrospective program of artistically and culturally significant films from throughout the history of Canadian cinema.

== See also ==
- List of films in the public domain in the United States

== Works cited ==
- Melnyk, George (2004). One Hundred Years of Canadian Cinema. University of Toronto Press. ISBN 080203568X.
