= Tit-Coq =

- Directed by: René Delacroix; Gratien Gélinas
- Written by: Gratien Gélinas
- Produced by: Gratien Gélinas
- Starring: Gratien Gélinas; Monique Miller
- Cinematography: Akos Farkas
- Edited by: Roger Garand; Anton Van De Water
- Music by: Maurice Blackburn; Morris C. Davis
- Production company: Productions Gratien Gélinas
- Distributed by: France Film
- Release date: February 20, 1952
- Running time: 104 minutes
- Country: Canada
- Language: French

Tit-Coq (lit. "Little Rooster") is a Canadian film, directed by René Delacroix and Gratien Gélinas, and released in 1952.

== Plot ==
Tit-Coq is a tale of love and the importance of family. It tells the story of Arthur Saint-Jean, a shy, awkward French-Canadian soldier with an irreverent sense of humour and a volatile temper, which is how he earned the nickname 'Tit-Coq'. He is a lonely, unhappy man until he falls in love with Marie-Ange, the sister of his friend Jean-Paul. When he is sent overseas to fight during World War II, Marie-Ange promises to wait for him, but she marries another man. When Tit-Coq returns to Montreal, he must accept the fact that he is again alone.

== Cast ==
- Gratien Gélinas - Tit-Coq/Arthur Saint-Jean
- Fred Barry - Pére Désilets
- Monique Miller - Marie-Ange Désilets
- Denise Pelletier - Germaine
- Clément Latour - Jean-Paul Désilets
- Juliette Béliveau - Tante Clara
- Amanda Alarie - Mere mere Désilets
- Jean Duceppe - Léopold Vermette
- George Alexander - Commandant
- Corinne Conley - Rosie
- Henri Poitras - Once Alcide
- Paul Dupuis - Le Padre

== Production ==
Gratien Gélinas wrote the revue sketch Le retour du conscrit in 1946. Film producer Paul L'Anglais suggested to Gélinas that he turn it into a screenplay. Gélinas did so in 1947, but he was unable to obtain financing for the film. He turned the screenplay into a play and it was performed over 500 times from 1947 to 1950. This popularity convinced L'Anglais and Joseph-Alexandre DeSève that the play could be adapted into a film.

== Release ==
300,000 people watched the film in Quebec between February and April 1953. A restored print of the film was screened at the 2000 Toronto International Film Festival, before going into a limited run at repertory theatres.

== Reception ==
The film won the 1953 Canadian Film Award for Film of the Year at the 5th Canadian Film Awards. Gélinas was so moved by the victory that he began to cry during his acceptance speech, and presenter Dorothy Lamour pulled the handkerchief out of his suit pocket and began to dab at his eyes as he spoke.

== Works cited ==
=== Books ===
- Loiselle, André (2003). Stage-Bound: Feature Film Adaptations of Canadian and Québécois Drama. McGill–Queen's University Press. ISBN 9780773571464.

=== Web ===
- "Tit-Coq". Toronto International Film Festival. Archived from the original on June 2, 2025.
