= Little Aurore's Tragedy =

La Petite Aurore, l'enfant martyre
- The cover for the film.
- Directed by: Jean-Yves Bigras
- Written by: Emile Asselin
- Produced by: Renaissance Films Distribution and Warner Bros.
- Starring: Yvonne Laflamme; Aurore Andois; Lucie Mitchell; Paul Desmarteaux; Janette Bertrand, Jean Lajeunesse; J. Léo Gagnon
- Release date: April 25, 1952
- Running time: 102 minutes
- Country: Canada
- Language: French
- Budget: $59,000

Little Aurore's Tragedy (French: La Petite Aurore, l'enfant martyre, lit. 'Little Aurore, the Child Martyr') is a Canadian 1952 Quebec biographical drama movie that was directed by Jean-Yves Bigras, produced by L'Alliance Cinematographique Canadienne and distributed by Renaissance Films Distribution and Warner Bros.

A classic of early Quebec cinema, La Petite Aurore, l'enfant martyre was based on the murder of Aurore Gagnon. Aurore (Laflamme) is 12 years old and lives with her sickly mother (McKinnon) and father (Desmarteaux) in a small village during the 1920s. A widowed neighbour (Mitchell) appears concerned and helpful, but Aurore discovers she actually hastens her mother's death. Her father marries the widow, and the child is forced to live with her cruel stepmother. She is systematically beaten and tortured until the local doctor (Gagnon) intervenes, but he is too late, and Aurore succumbs to her abuse. This film was remade in 2005 by Luc Dionne and was named Aurore.

== Production ==
The film had a budget of $59,000 (equivalent to $682,239 in 2025).

== Works cited ==
- Melnyk, George (2004). One Hundred Years of Canadian Cinema. University of Toronto Press. ISBN 080203568X.

== See also ==
- Curse of Aurore
