= The Promised Land (miniseries) =

- Also known as: Les Brûlés
- Genre: Historical drama
- Written by: Bernard Devlin
- Directed by: Bernard Devlin
- Composer: Félix Leclerc
- Country of origin: Canada
- Original language: English
- No. of seasons: 1
- No. of episodes: 8 (French version); 4 (English version)

Production
- Producers: Victor Jobin; Léonard Forest; Guy Glover
- Editors: Raymond Le Boursier; David Mayerovitch
- Running time: 30 minutes
- Production company: National Film Board of Canada

Original release
- Network: Radio-Canada; CBC Television
- Release: 15 November 1957 – 1957

The Promised Land (French: Les Brûlés) is a Canadian historical drama television miniseries by the National Film Board of Canada. It was first broadcast in 1957 on Radio-Canada, then dubbed into English and adapted for broadcast by CBC Television as a four-part series in 1962. The NFB now classifies it as a feature film.

== Premise ==
The series was adapted from the Hervé Biron novel Nuages sur les brûlés concerning the 1930s settlement of Quebec's Abitibi district and the workers who toiled to develop the area during the Great Depression. Episodes included music and appearances by folk musician Félix Leclerc. It was broadcast on Radio-Canada as an eight-part series for the network's Panoramique anthology.

The $144,000 production was also released as a 114-minute feature film in 1959 as a condensed version of the television footage.

== Scheduling ==
Les brûlés was first broadcast on Radio-Canada on Fridays at 9 p.m. starting 15 November 1957. The Promised Land adaptation was broadcast as half-hour episodes Sundays at 10:30 p.m. (Eastern) from 16 September to 7 October 1962 on CBC Television.
