= A Man and His Sin =

1949 film by Paul Gury

- French: Un homme et son péché
- Directed by: Paul Gury
- Written by: Paul Gury
- Based on: Un homme et son péché by Claude-Henri Grignon
- Produced by: Paul L'Anglais
- Starring: Hector Charland; Nicole Germain; Guy Provost; Ovila Légaré
- Cinematography: Drummond Drury
- Edited by: Jean Boisvert; Richard J. Jarvis
- Music by: Hector Gratton
- Production company: Quebec Productions
- Distributed by: France Film
- Release date: January 28, 1949
- Running time: 102 minutes
- Country: Canada
- Language: French
- Budget: $137,000

A Man and His Sin (French: Un homme et son péché) is a Canadian drama film, directed by Paul Gury and released in 1949. Adapted from Claude-Henri Grignon's 1933 novel Un homme et son péché, the film stars Hector Charland as Séraphin Poudrier, the wealthy but miserly mayor of the village of Sainte-Adèle, Quebec, Nicole Germain as Donalda Laloge, a village resident who was given in marriage to Séraphin as payment for a family debt even though she is actually in love with her boyfriend Alexis Labranche (Guy Provost), and Ovila Légaré as the village priest Antoine Labelle.

However, the film did not replicate the plot of the original novel, in which Séraphin's miserliness led directly to Donalda's death; instead, it tells a story in which Séraphin loans Alexis $200 to buy a farm, but then uses his power to prevent Alexis from getting a job to repay him so that Alexis will remain indebted and under Séraphin's control.

The cast also included Henri Poitras, Suzanne Avon, Adjutor Bouré, Eugène Daigneault, Arthur Lefebvre, Armand Leguet, George Alexander, Juliette Béliveau, Julien Lippé, Lucien Martin, Camille Ducharme, Paul Guèvremont, Georges Toupin and Conrad Gauthier.

A sequel film, Séraphin, was released the following year with most of the same cast.

== Production ==
The film had a budget of $137,000 (equivalent to $1,843,885 in 2025).

== Response ==
Producer Paul L'Anglais received a special award "for making a definite advance in Canadian film history" at the 1st Canadian Film Awards in April 1949. At the 2nd Canadian Film Awards the following year, Quebec Productions, the studio of L'Anglais and his business partner René Germain, received a special citation "for sustained and creative effort in establishing a feature-length film industry in Canada", collectively based on the films A Man and His Sin, Séraphin, Whispering City/La Forteresse and The Village Priest (Le Curé du village).

Quebec film historian Pierre Véronneau later characterized A Man and His Sin, The Village Priest and Séraphin as a group of films about "cowboys in cassocks", which transplanted some of the heroic tropes of Western films onto priests in the church-dominated society of pre-Quiet Revolution Quebec.

== Works cited ==
- Melnyk, George (2004). One Hundred Years of Canadian Cinema. University of Toronto Press. ISBN 080203568X.
