= Claude Jutra =

Canadian actor, film director, and screenwriter

- Born: Claude Jutras; March 11, 1930; Montreal, Quebec, Canada
- Died: November 5, 1986 (aged 56); Montreal, Quebec, Canada
- Occupations: Film director, screenwriter, actor
- Years active: 1949–1985

Claude Jutra (French pronunciation: [klod ʒytʁa]; March 11, 1930 – November 5, 1986) was a Canadian actor, film director, and screenwriter.

The Prix Jutra, and the Academy of Canadian Cinema and Television's Claude Jutra Award, were named in his honour because of his importance in Quebec cinema history. The awards were renamed in 2016, as were streets named for him, following the publication of allegations that he had sexually abused children.

== Life and career ==
Jutra was born and raised in Montreal, Quebec as Claude Jutras. His father, Albert Jutras, was a radiologist and a director of the Collège des médecins du Québec. He made the short films Dément du lac Jean-Jeunes and Perpetual Movement (Mouvement perpétuel) before graduating from the Université de Montréal with a degree in medicine, but turned to filmmaking instead of medical practice after completing his degree. He studied theatre in Montréal (1952–53) and wrote his first original Quebec television play (L'Ecole de la peur) in 1953, and a television series, Images en boite, in 1954. He was openly gay.

He went to work at the National Film Board of Canada in 1956 where he trained in all facets of filmmaking, although his first film for the NFB, Trio-Brio, was permanently lost when the organization moved its head office from Ottawa to Montreal. As a filmmaker, he dropped the s from his surname, a common Québécois surname, because the Jutra spelling was more distinctive. In 1958 he went to France and Africa to work with noted French filmmaker, Jean Rouch.

Claude Jutra's career in film, in a certain sense, paralleled Quebec cinema itself. Beginning as an amateur at a time when there was no Quebec cinema, he participated in (and sometime led) several of the principal developments in Quebec: traditional documentaries and docudramas at the NFB; the germinal period of direct cinema; the first steps in the early 1960s toward independent film production; and later trend toward large-budget features, such as Kamouraska, a box office failure now revealed to be a major work in the canon of Canadian cinema. Overall, his work had a consistent thematic pattern: young people and the (often traumatic) passage from innocence to knowledge, a theme that has nostalgic overtones.

With financing and production provided by the NFB, Jutra co-wrote and directed the 1971 film Mon oncle Antoine, which until very recently has been ranked as the best Canadian movie ever made. As well as directing several cinema vérité shorts such as Wrestling and The Devil's Toy (1966 film), he also co-directed with Norman McLaren and starred in the innovative pixilation Academy Award-nominated short A Chairy Tale.

He was offered the Order of Canada in 1972 but declined because he was a Quebec separatist. In 1984, he was awarded the Prix Albert-Tessier, given to individuals for an outstanding career in Québec cinema.

== Death ==
Jutra was diagnosed with early-onset Alzheimer's disease in the early 1980s. He was reported missing on November 5, 1986. His body was found in the St. Lawrence River in April 1987, with a note in his pocket reading "Je m'appelle Claude Jutra" ("My name is Claude Jutra"); an autopsy later confirmed drowning as his cause of death.

== Allegations of child sexual abuse ==
In 2016, 30 years after his death, interviews with anonymized friends of Jutra claiming he was a pederast were made public in journalist Yves Lever's book Claude Jutra, biographie, Lever said that "one of Jutra's victims was under 14 years old." He also maintained that Jutra's proclivities were known by many people in the industry, "but nobody made a big deal out of it." Lever's attempts to contact who he described as "the main victim" were declined. In the wake of the allegations, Québec Cinéma held an emergency meeting to discuss changing the name of the Prix Jutra.

On February 17, 2016, La Presse published an interview with an alleged victim of Jutra, who requested to remain anonymous, relating sexual abuse from the ages of 6 to 16. On the same day, Cinéma Québec removed Jutra's name from their awards following a request from the Minister of Culture of Quebec, Hélène David. To begin the renaming process, she requested the Commission de toponymie (Quebec Toponymy Commission) compile a list of streets and public places in the province bearing Jutra's name. Montreal mayor Denis Coderre additionally announced that the city would remove Jutra's name from streets and parks in its jurisdiction.

Of the controversy, The Globe and Mail wrote: "Few legendary figures have fallen so quickly and so completely. Merely 24 hours after the official publication of the first explosive allegation of child abuse against the Canadian cinematic pioneer, the film industry and governments started scrubbing the name Claude Jutra from every trophy, park and street."

== Selected films ==
=== As actor ===
- A Chairy Tale - 1957
- À tout prendre - 1964
- The Rape of a Sweet Young Girl (Le viol d'une jeune fille douce) - 1968
- Préambule - 1969
- Act of the Heart - 1970
- We Are Far from the Sun (On est loin du soleil) - 1971
- Mon oncle Antoine -1971
- Love on the Nose - 1974 (TV)
- Pour le meilleur et pour le pire - 1975
- The Flower Between the Teeth (La fleur aux dents) - 1976
- Arts Cuba - 1977 (voice)
- Two Solitudes - 1978
- Riel - 1979 (TV)
- Till Death Do Us Part - 1982 (TV)
- The Tin Flute (Bonheur d'occasion) - 1983

=== As director ===
Jutra made his debut as a director with Le dément du lac Jean-Jeunes - it explored themes that remained throughout his work, a nostalgia for childhood, madness, and troubled waters.

His collaboration with Michel Brault began at this early period. Mouvement perpétuel was influenced by Jean Cocteau's Le Sang d'un poète. L'École de la peur (1953) was the first television film made in Quebec. Toward the end of the 1950s, he moved to France, and François Truffaut, who became a friend, asked him to direct Anna la Bonne (1959), a Cocteau scenario. In 1960, Jutra returned to Canada.

==== Fiction ====
- Le dément du lac Jean-Jeunes - 1948, short film
- Perpetual Movement (Mouvement perpétuel) - 1949, short film
- L'école de la peur - 1953, TV movie
- Pierrot des bois - 1956, short film
- A Chairy Tale - 1957 short animated film co-directed with Norman McLaren
- Les mains nettes - 1958
- Anna la bonne - 1959, short film from a scenario by Jean Cocteau
- À tout prendre - 1963
- Marie-Christine - 1970, short film
- Mon oncle Antoine - 1971
- Kamouraska - 1973
- For Better or For Worse (Pour le meilleur et pour le pire) - 1975
- Ada - 1977, TV movie created for anthology series For the Record
- Dreamspeaker - 1977, TV movie created for anthology series For the Record
- Seer Was Here - 1977, TV movie created for anthology series For the Record
- The Patriarch - 1978, episode of The Beachcombers
- The Wordsmith - 1979, TV movie
- Surfacing - 1980
- By Design - 1981
- Un petit bonhomme de chemin - 1982, unfinished film
- The Dame in Colour (La dame en couleurs) - 1985
- My Father, My Rival - 1985, TV movie

==== Documentaries ====
- Au service de l'esprit troublé (Short film Co-Directed with Stanley Jackson, 1955)
- Chantons maintenant (Short film, 1956)
- Jeunesses musicales (Short film, 1956)
- Rondo de Mozart (Short film, 1957)
- Félix Leclerc, troubadour (Short film, 1958)
- Fred Barry, comédien (Short film, 1959)
- Le Niger, jeune république (Short film, 1961)
- La Lutte (Wrestling) (Short film Co-Directed with Marcel Carrière, Claude Fournier and Michel Brault, 1961)
- Québec-U.S.A. ou l'invasion pacifique (Short film Co-Directed with Michel Brault, 1962)
- Petit discours de la méthode (Short film Co-Directed with Pierre Patry, 1963)
- Ciné boum (Short film Co-Directed with Robert Russell, 1964)
- Comment savoir... (1966)
- Rouli-roulant (Short film, 1966)
- The Devil's Toy (Short film, 1966)
- Au coeur de la ville (Short film, 1969)
- Wow (1969)
- Québec fête juin '75 (Co-Directed with Jean-Claude Labrecque, 1976)
- Arts Cuba (Short film, 1977)

== Awards and nominations ==
Canadian Film Awards

- (1950) Canadian Film Award, Amateur for Perpetual Movement (Mouvement perpétuel)
- (1958) Canadian Film Award, Arts and Experimental for A Chairy Tale (shared with Norman McLaren)
- (1964) Canadian Film Award, Feature Film for À tout prendre (shared with Robert Hershorn)
- (1971) Canadian Film Award, Direction (Feature) for Mon Oncle Antoine
- (1977) Canadian Film Award, Direction (Non-Feature) for Dreamspeaker

Genie Awards

- (1986) Genie Award, Best Achievement in Direction for The Dame in Colour (La Dame en couleurs)
- (1986) Genie Award, Best Screenplay for The Dame in Colour (La Dame en couleurs)

== Film about Claude Jutra ==
Jutra's close friend, filmmaker Paule Baillargeon, directed the feature documentary Claude Jutra: An Unfinished Story in 2002.

Marie-Josée Saint-Pierre used a mix of archival footage of Jutra with animation to create the 2014 short documentary film Jutra.

== Legacy ==
George Lucas stated in an interview that he shot the first Star Wars film like a Jutra documentary.

Besides the film awards (Claude Jutra Award and Jutra Award), a number of places bear or bore Jutra's name, all found in Quebec:

Multiple parks and streets later were renamed or scheduled to be renamed after the pederasty allegations in 2016.
