= Guy Provost =

French Canadian actor

- Born: May 19, 1925; Hull (now Gatineau), Quebec, Canada
- Died: February 10, 2004 (aged 78); Montreal, Quebec, Canada

Guy Provost, OC CQ (May 19, 1925 – February 10, 2004) was a French Canadian actor.

In 2002, he was made an Officer of the Order of Canada for being a "giant of the performing arts, admired and respected for his sensitivity and discipline, [he] is also a model for the new generation of actors". In 2003, he was made a chevalier of the National Order of Quebec.

== See also ==
- Compagnons de Saint-Laurent
