= Gratien Gélinas =

Canadian author, playwright, actor, director, producer and administrator

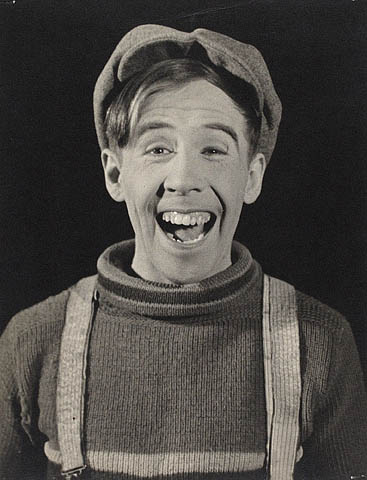
- Close-up of Gratien Gélinas playing Fridolin. Montreal (Quebec, Canada), around 1938
- Born: December 8, 1909; Saint-Tite, Quebec, Canada
- Died: March 16, 1999 (aged 89); Montreal, Quebec, Canada
- Resting place: Notre Dame des Neiges Cemetery
- Occupations: author, playwright, actor, director, producer
- Known for: Tit-Coq, Bousille et les Justes, Hier, les enfants dansaient
- Spouse: Huguette Oligny (m. 1973)
- Relatives: Mitsou, granddaughter

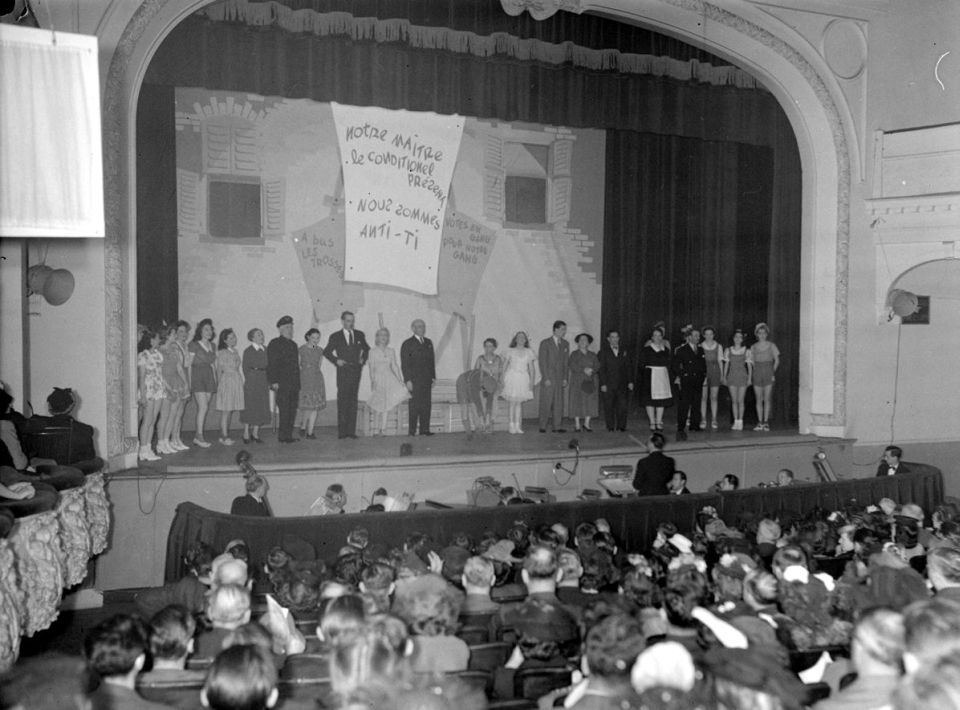
Gélinas on stage after a 1945 performance of Fridolinades

Gratien Gélinas, CC CQ FRSC (December 8, 1909 – March 16, 1999) was a Canadian writer, playwright, actor, director, producer and administrator who is considered one of the founders of modern Canadian theatre and film.

His major works include Tit-Coq (1948), Bousille et les Justes (1959), and Hier, les enfants dansaient (1968). He also wrote a series of satirical revues known as the Fridolinades.

The Fridolinades revues, consisting of comic sketches, songs, and monologues, were named for the often-featured character Fridolin. A poor boy from Montreal, he wore a tri-colour Canadiens hockey jersey, knee socks, and suspenders. While not quite joual, the French he spoke was reflective of what a person would hear on the streets of Montreal, which made it stand out in sharp contrast to the continental French being spoken in most other theatres. Fridolin's boundless optimism in the face of constant disappointment came to emblemize the Quebec spirit of "survivance", and made him one of the first distinctly Canadian heroes of the stage. His success was considerable: Gélinas was declared by an adoring public to be the first playwright "de chez nous" (from our place).

Gélinas' play Hier, les enfants dansaient (Yesterday the Children were Dancing) takes place entirely in one night. Based in 1966, it revolves around the tumultuous politics in Quebec around that time though its characters are entirely fictitious. Pierre Gravel is debating whether or not to accept a prominent position within the Liberal party. Throughout the course of the play, Gravel's sons, André and Larry, admit that they are active members of the separatist party and responsible for the bombs that had been threatening the city and destroying historical landmarks.

Gélinas also founded the Comédie-Canadienne, which was active until 1972.

In 1967, Gélinas was made an Officer of the Order of Canada and was promoted to Companion in 1989. In 1985, he was made a Knight of the National Order of Quebec. He received an honorary doctorate from the Royal Military College of Canada in St-Jean in 1989.

He married Huguette Oligny in 1973 and is the grandfather of actress and pop singer Mitsou Gélinas, MusiquePlus veejay, writer and actor Abeille Gélinas, and writer Anne-Marie Sicotte who has written the biography "Gratien Gélinas : la ferveur et le doute", published by the Éditions Québec/Amérique in 1995 et 1996. After his death in 1999, he was entombed at the Notre Dame des Neiges Cemetery in Montreal. The Library and Archives Canada contains sound recordings and transcriptions of Anne-Marie Sicotte's interview with Gelinas.

== Filmography ==
- La dame aux camélias, la vraie - 1942
- Fridolinons - 1945
- The Plouffe Family (La famille Plouffe) - 1953
- Tit-Coq - 1953
- Red - 1970
- Cordélia - 1980
- Peau de banane - 1982
- Agnes of God - 1985
- The Canadian Conspiracy - 1985
- The Mills of Power (Les Tisserands du pouvoir) - 1988
