= Tus Besos =

Tus Besos (Spanish "your kisses") may refer to:

- Tus Besos, Miguel Sandoval (composer) 1942
- "Tus Besos", hit single by OV7
- Tus Besos (Juan Luis Guerra song)
- "Tus Besos", song by Cliff Richard, written by L.Newman, adap. by G. Dasca
- "Tus Besos", song by Bryan Teapila
