= Basilières =

Basilières may refer to:

== Surname ==
- Andrée Basilières (1915-2007), Canadian actress
- Michel Basilières (born 1960), Canadian writer
