= Dateline (disambiguation) =

In journalism, a dateline describes the date when and location where a news article originated.

Dateline may also refer to:

== Television ==
- Dateline (Australian TV program), an Australian television public affairs program
- Dateline (TV series), a Canadian historical drama which aired from 1955 to 1956
- Dateline London, a British news discussion programme
- Dateline NBC, an American television news series

== Other uses ==
- Dateline (dating service), a UK-based computer dating service founded in 1966
- International Date Line, an imaginary line near the 180° line of longitude that demarcates the change of one calendar day to the next

== See also ==
- 180th meridian
- Byline (disambiguation)
