= The Reluctant Widow (film) =

1950 British historical drama film

- Directed by: Bernard Knowles
- Written by: Basil Boothroyd (as J.B. Boothroyd); Gordon Wellesley; Georgette Heyer (novel)
- Produced by: Gordon Wellesley
- Starring: Jean Kent; Guy Rolfe
- Cinematography: Jack Hildyard
- Edited by: John D. Guthridge
- Music by: Allan Gray
- Production company: Two Cities Films
- Distributed by: General Film Distributors (UK)
- Release date: 1 May 1950 (UK)
- Running time: 91 minutes
- Country: United Kingdom
- Language: English

The Reluctant Widow is a 1950 British historical drama film directed by Bernard Knowles and starring Jean Kent, Guy Rolfe, Paul Dupuis and Lana Morris. It was written by Gordon Wellesley and Basil Boothroyd (as J.B. Boothroyd) based on the 1946 novel The Reluctant Widow by Georgette Heyer. The screenplay concerns a governess who marries a British aristocrat, and inherits his country house when he dies. The ongoing Napoleonic Wars see her become embroiled with a spy ring.

== Plot ==
During the Napoleonic Wars Elinor meets Lord Carlyon, who arranges for her to marry a dying man, so that on the man's death Carlyon can take advantage of his country house. There Elinor becomes involved with smugglers and a spy ring.

== Cast ==
- Jean Kent as Elinor
- Guy Rolfe as Lord Carlyon
- Paul Dupuis as Lord Nivelle
- Lana Morris as Becky
- Kathleen Byron as Madame Annette de Chevreaux
- Scott Forbes as Francois Cheviot
- Anthony Tancred as Nicky
- Peter Hammond as Eustace Cheviot
- Jean Cadell as Mrs. Barrows
- Andrew Cruickshank as Lord Bedlington
- George Thorpe as Colonel Strong
- Ralph Truman as Scowler
- James Carney as Major Forbes
- Allan Jeayes as Colonel
- Hector MacGregor as Sir Malcolm Torrens
- Noel Howlett as The Vicar

== Production ==
It was shot at Denham Studios. The film's art direction was by Carmen Dillon while the costumes were designed by Beatrice Dawson.

== Critical reception ==
The Monthly Film Bulletin wrote: "Novelettish story, with undistinguished performances from the leading players."

Kine Weekly wrote: "It is well staged, but there is much more talk than action in the tangled and extravagant tale. Stagey, to say the least, it's hardly the action-loving ninepennies' cup of tea ... The picture tries hard to the period bedroom comedy and swashbnckling romance in one, but its verbal excesses cause it to trip over bedpost and scabbard."

Picturegoer wrote: "Jean Kent in costume again – this time during the lull before Waterloo – suffers a great many serio-comic indignities with considerable gusto in this fim, which is as packed with incident as it is uncertain in mood. Picturegoers may be forgiven if they cannot quite decide whether they are supposed to suffer and adventure with the heroine, or sit back and laugh at what they might suppose to be a gentle satire on costume melodrama."

Bosley Crowther wrote in The New York Times, "except for the rather fine surroundings and some nice eighteenth century costumes, there is no more in The Reluctant Widow than a genteel invitation to doze."

Robin Karney in the Radio Times wrote, "a good-looking but rather muddled and unsatisfactory adaptation of a novel by Georgette Heyer, which entertains in fits and starts."

In British Sound Films: The Studio Years 1928–1959 David Quinlan rated the film as "mediocre", writing: "Incident-filled tale hovers unhappily between comedy and adventure."
