= Patricia Roc =

English actress (1915–2003)

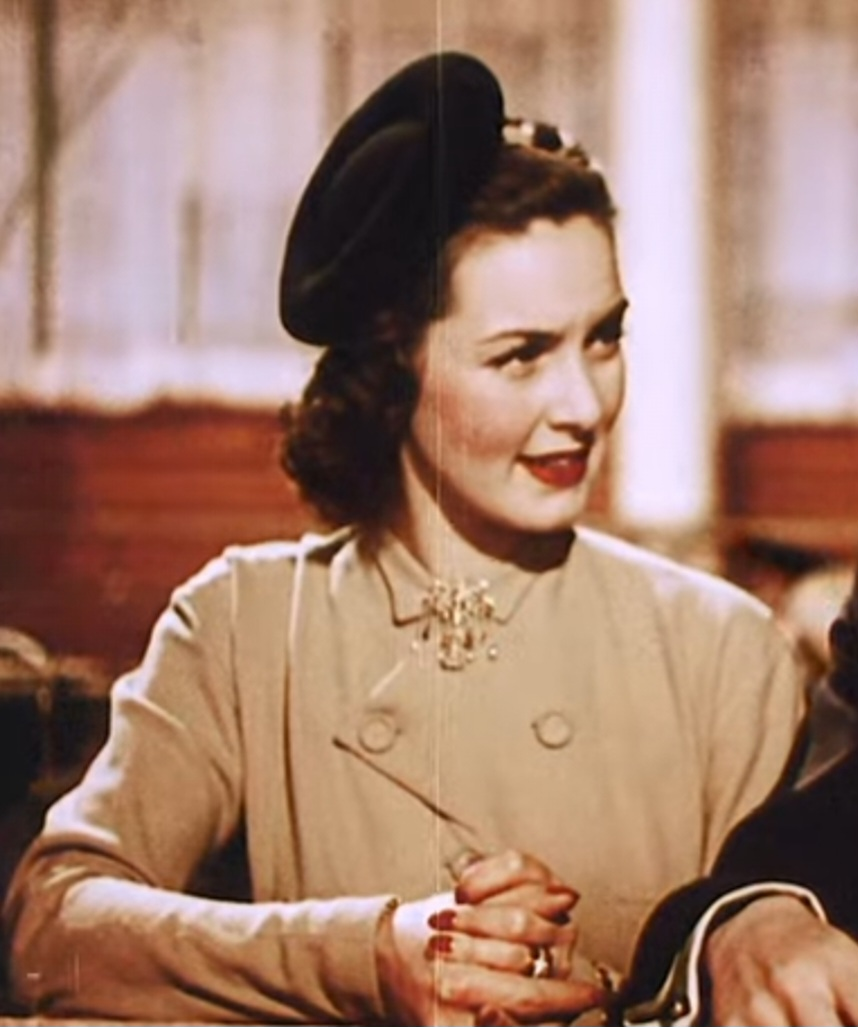
- Roc in The Man on the Eiffel Tower (1950)
- Born: Felicia Miriam Ursula Herold; 7 June 1915; Hampstead, London, England
- Died: 30 December 2003 (aged 88); Locarno, Switzerland
- Other name: Felicia Riese
- Occupation: Actress
- Years active: 1938–1962
- Spouses: Dr. Murray Laing (m. 1939; div. 1944) André Thomas (m. 1949; died 1954) Walter Reif (m. 1964; died 1986)
- Children: 1
- Website: patriciaroc.com

Patricia Roc (born Felicia Miriam Ursula Herold; 7 June 1915 – 30 December 2003) was an English film actress, popular in the Gainsborough melodramas such as Madonna of the Seven Moons (1945) and The Wicked Lady (1945), though she only made one film in Hollywood, Canyon Passage (1946). She also appeared in Millions Like Us (1943), Jassy (1947), The Brothers (1947) and When the Bough Breaks (1947).

She was employed by the studio of J. Arthur Rank, who called her "the archetypal British beauty". She achieved her greatest level of popularity in British films during the Second World War in escapist melodramas for Gainsborough Studios. She did little acting work after the death of her second husband in 1954, making only a few television appearances including the first episode of The Saint.

== Early life ==
Born in Hampstead, London, to apparently unmarried parents, the daughter of Felix Herold, a paper merchant, and Miriam (née Angell). In 1922, her half-French mother married Dutch-Belgian stockbroker, André Magnus Riese, who legally adopted young Felicia and her sister Barbara (1919–2016; later the wife of Fred Perry). She became known as Felicia Riese and did not discover her adoption until 1949. She was educated at private schools in London and Paris, then was accepted into the Royal Academy of Dramatic Art in 1937.

West End theatre producer Sydney Carroll discovered her and cast her in The Mask of Virtue at the Ambassadors Theatre in London. When Carroll thought Felicia Riese sounded "too foreign" and without character, he suggested she change her name to something short and memorable. As there was then a Rock Film Studios Carroll suggested "Rock" as a surname. She agreed but she suggested dropping the "k" to make the surname more memorable and shorter and "Patricia" was the nearest name to "Felicia".

== Film career ==
Roc began her career as a stage actress, debuting in the 1938 London production of Nuts in May, in which she was seen by Alexander Korda, who gave her an uncredited bit in The Divorce of Lady X (1938) and then a leading role as a Polish princess in The Rebel Son.

She had roles in The Gaunt Stranger (1939), The Mind of Mr. Reeder (1939), and The Missing People (1940). She had a bigger part in A Window in London (1940), the comedy Pack Up Your Troubles (1940), Dr. O'Dowd (1940), Three Silent Men (1940), It Happened to One Man (1940), and The Farmer's Wife (1941).

Her parts grew bigger: My Wife's Family (1941), Suspected Person (1942), Let the People Sing (1942), and We'll Meet Again (1943) with Vera Lynn.

=== Stardom ===
Roc was top-billed in Millions Like Us (1943) from Gainsborough Studios. It was a success, and Gainsborough gave her another lead, as a nun interned by the Germans in Two Thousand Women (1944). According to one writer these movies "established her as a symbol of war's transformative effect upon the status of women."

She appeared alongside two of Gainsborough's biggest stars, Margaret Lockwood and Stewart Granger, in Love Story (1944), a big hit. Roc played the jealous rival of Margaret Lockwood. She later commented that although they were required to slap each other's faces, she and Lockwood were always the best of friends. Madonna of the Seven Moons (1945), with Granger and Phyllis Calvert, was another success.

Neither of them, however, did as well as The Wicked Lady (1945), where Roc played Lockwood's best friend. It was the most successful movie at the British box office in 1946. Roc's more overt bisexuality in such films as The Wicked Lady was played down for the American market (even her décolletage led US censors to call for retakes to de-emphasise it) and "the Goddess of Odeons", whilst Noël Coward said she was "a phenomenon" and "an unspoiled film star who can act".

She was also in Johnny Frenchman (1945). Co-starring in that film was Ralph Michael, who soon after divorced his wife Fay Compton; Roc was named in proceedings.

Her brief move to Hollywood to film Canyon Passage (1946), a Western in Technicolor, was a lend-lease agreement between Rank Pictures and Universal Studios of British in return for American film actors. During filming, Roc was romantically linked with Ronald Reagan, while her US co-star Susan Hayward stated "that Limey glamour girl is a helluva dame." Despite good reviews and a remarked likeness to Deanna Durbin, she did not click with the American filmgoing public.

Roc returned to Britain to make The Brothers (1947), a melodrama that was a commercial disappointment. She was in an expensive British-US co production So Well Remembered (1947), which was a hit in Britain but failed to recoup its cost. Jassy (1947), a melodrama with Lockwood, was a big hit. When the Bough Breaks (1947), another melodrama, performed reasonably well.

In 1947 British exhibitors voted Roc the sixth-most-popular British star in the country. The following year she was ninth.

She walked out of London Belongs to Me saying she was miscast.

After making a cameo as herself in Holiday Camp (1947), Roc was in One Night with You (1948), a musical comedy with Nino Martini.

=== France ===
She made two films in France, Return to Life (1949) and The Man on the Eiffel Tower. She returned to Britain to appear in a comedy The Perfect Woman (1949) then walked out on her contract with Rank in March 1949.

In August 1949 she married French cameraman André Thomas.

In Paris she made Black Jack (1950). She also appeared in Fugitive from Montreal (1951), a French-Canadian co production.

Roc returned to Britain for the first time in 18 months to make Circle of Danger (1951) with Ray Milland. She then returned for Something Money Can't Buy (1952).

=== Later films ===
Roc's later films included The Widow (1955) and The Hypnotist (1957).

Roc returned to Britain later in the decade following the death of husband André Thomas. She produced only three more films and made a few television appearances (including the first episode of The Saint, her final acting role).

== Later life and death ==
In 1964 she married businessman Walter Reif and retired from acting. She was all but forgotten until 1975 when she made the headlines for being fined £25 for shoplifting from Marks & Spencer in Oxford Street. It is thought that this was a means of regaining attention from the public. Soon after, she and her husband moved to Switzerland. Reif died in 1986, Roc died in 2003.

== Filmography ==
=== Film ===
| Year | Title | Role | Notes | Ref. |
|---|---|---|---|---|
| 1938 | The Divorce of Lady X | Minor role | Uncredited | |
| 1938 | The Gaunt Stranger | Mary Lenley | | |
| 1938 | The Barbarian and the Lady | Marina | | |
| 1939 | The Mysterious Mr. Reeder | Doris Bevan | | |
| 1939 | The Missing People | Doris Bevan | | |
| 1940 | Pack Up Your Troubles | Sally Brown | | |
| 1940 | A Window in London | Pat | Released as Lady in Distress in USA | |
| 1940 | Dr. O'Dowd | Rosemary | | |
| 1940 | Three Silent Men | Pat Quentin | | |
| 1940 | It Happened to One Man | Betty Quair | | |
| 1941 | The Farmer's Wife | Sibley | | |
| 1941 | My Wife's Family | Peggy Gay | | |
| 1942 | Suspected Person | Joan Raynor | | |
| 1942 | Let the People Sing | Hope Ollerton | | |
| 1943 | We'll Meet Again | Ruth | | |
| 1943 | Millions Like Us | Celia Crowson | | |
| 1944 | Love Story | Judy | | |
| 1944 | Two Thousand Women | Rosemary Brown / Mary Maugham | | |
| 1945 | Madonna of the Seven Moons | Angela Labardi | | |
| 1945 | Johnny Frenchman | Sue Pomeroy | | |
| 1945 | The Wicked Lady | Caroline | | |
| 1946 | Canyon Passage | Caroline Marsh | | |
| 1947 | The Brothers | Mary | | |
| 1947 | So Well Remembered | Julie Morgan | | |
| 1947 | Jassy | Dilys Helmar | | |
| 1947 | When the Bough Breaks | Lily Bates | | |
| 1947 | Holiday Camp | Herself | | |
| 1948 | One Night with You | Mary Santell | | |
| 1949 | The Perfect Woman | Penelope Belman | | |
| 1949 | Return to Life | Lieutenant Evelyne | (segment 2 : "Le retour d'Antoine") | |
| 1949 | The Man on the Eiffel Tower | Helen Kirby | | |
| 1950 | Fugitive from Montreal | Helen Bering | | |
| 1950 | Black Jack | Ingrid Dekker | | |
| 1951 | Circle of Danger | Elspeth Graham | | |
| 1952 | Something Money Can't Buy | Anne Wilding | | |
| 1953 | La mia vita è tua | Laura | | |
| 1955 | Cartouche | Donna Violante | | |
| 1955 | The Widow | Diana | | |
| 1957 | The Hypnotist | Mary Foster | | |
| 1957 | The House in the Woods | Carol Carter | | |
| 1960 | Bluebeard's Ten Honeymoons | Mme. Vivienne Dureaux | | |

=== Television ===
| Year | Title | Role | Notes | Ref. |
|---|---|---|---|---|
| 1956 | The Errol Flynn Theatre | | Episode : "Farewell Performance" | |
| 1958 | White Hunter | Marge Wilson | Episode: "Pegasus" | |
| 1959 | No Hiding Place | Mrs. Ottlone | Episode: "Who Is Gustav Varnia?" | |
| 1960 | Skyport | Iris West | 1 episode | |
| 1961 | Dixon of Dock Green | Brenda | Episode: "A Kiss for the Constable" | |
| 1962 | The Saint | Madge Clarron | Episode: "The Talented Husband", (final appearance) | |
