= Killing of Diren Dede =

Exchange student killed in 2014

On April 27, 2014, 17-year-old Diren Dede, a German-Turkish exchange student from Hamburg, Germany, living in Missoula, Montana, was shot to death by Markus Kaarma.

== Incident ==
Dede entered Kaarma's garage late at night looking for alcohol; according to prosecutors, Kaarma had deliberately set out to attract and then shoot the burglar after having been the victim of several recent burglaries. In December 2014, Kaarma was convicted of deliberate homicide, a charge that is equivalent to first degree murder in other states. He was sentenced to 70 years in prison and will be eligible for parole after 20 years of incarceration. In February 2017, the Montana Supreme Court upheld Kaarma's conviction. The United States Supreme Court refused to hear an appeal at the federal level as to whether his 6th Amendment rights had been violated and that he had not received an impartial jury.

In July 2019, Missoula County District Judge Ed McLean, who retired shortly after presiding over Kaarma's trial, denied Kaarma's request for a new trial based on ineffective assistance of counsel, writing that Kaarma's attorneys had performed "...within the wide range of professionally competent assistance".

== Background ==
Montana's castle doctrine law was amended in 2009 allowing the use of deadly force if a homeowner "reasonably believes" an intruder is attempting to harm them. The amendment was sponsored by the U.S.'s biggest gun lobby, the National Rifle Association (NRA). Before the amendment, homeowners could use deadly force only if the invader acted in a violent way.

== Reactions ==
The case attracted national and international attention, particularly in Germany, Dede's home country. Much of the attention focused on Montana's castle doctrine law, which Kaarma claimed justified his actions. NBC's Dateline television series profiled the incident on an episode that originally aired on April 30, 2015.

In response to the guilty verdict in the Kaarma case, the Moms Demand Action for Gun Sense in America, a non-profit organization, released the following public statement from its Montana Chapter volunteer Julia Starrett.

Today justice prevailed over senseless and unnecessary gun violence with the guilty verdict in the Kaarma trial. Seventeen-year-old Diren Dede’s death did not have to happen – and we know that unfortunately, there are laws on the books that embolden people like Mr. Kaarma to shoot first and ask questions later.
