= Here's to Romance =

1935 film by Alfred Edward Green

- Directed by: Alfred E. Green
- Written by: Sonya Levien; Ernest Pascal; Arthur Richman
- Starring: Nino Martini; Genevieve Tobin; Anita Louise
- Cinematography: L. William O'Connell
- Edited by: Irene Morra
- Music by: Louis De Francesco; Hugo Friedhofer
- Production company: Fox Film
- Distributed by: 20th Century Fox
- Release dates: August 27, 1935 (premiere); October 4, 1935
- Running time: 82 minutes
- Country: United States
- Language: English

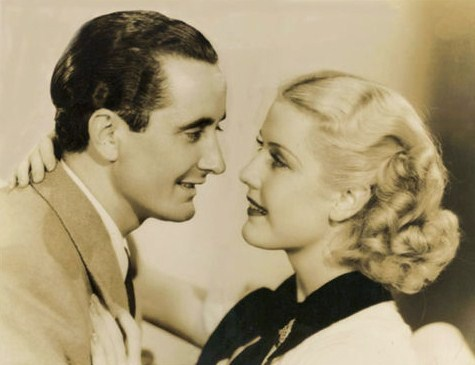
Nino Martini and Anita Louise in Here's to Romance

Here's to Romance is a 1935 American musical comedy film directed by Alfred E. Green and starring Nino Martini, Genevieve Tobin and Anita Louise.

== Plot ==
The wife of a music teacher, who has been angered by her husband's philandering, arranges to send one of his male students to study opera in Paris as her protégé. This causes complications when he falls in love in France with a woman who is upset about his relationship with his patron. Devastated he ends up back in New York as a sheet music salesman. Things soon change when he is reunited with his true love and is invited to perform by the Metropolitan Opera.

== Main cast ==
- Nino Martini as Nino Donelli
- Genevieve Tobin as Kathleen Gerard
- Anita Louise as Lydia Lubov
- Maria Gambarelli as Rosa
- Ernestine Schumann-Heink as herself
- Reginald Denny as Emery Gerard
- Vicente Escudero as Spanish Gypsy Dancer
- Adrian Rosley as Sandoval
- Mathilde Comont as Viola
- Elsa Buchanan as Enid
- Miles Mander as Bert
- Keye Luke as Saito
- Pat Somerset as Fred
- Albert Conti as LeFevre
- Egon Brecher as Descartes
- Orrin Burke as Carstairs
- Armand Kaliz as Andriot

== Critical reception ==
Variety gave a lukewarm review. They wrote that "a sturdier story" was needed for Martini's film debut, and that in this film "his impression is nice, but not particularly significant ... His voice is undeniable ... [and he is a] highly personable, and an engaging Latin type." They predicted that, with better material, a successful film career may be possible for him.

== Bibliography ==
- Solomon, Aubrey. The Fox Film Corporation, 1915–1935: A History and Filmography. McFarland, 2011.
