= Miguel Sandoval (composer) =

- Birth name: Miguel Angel Sandoval Cabrera
- Born: 3 November 1902; Guazacapán, Guatemala
- Died: 24 August 1953 (aged 50); New York City, New York, United States
- Genres: Classical; Spanish folk; opera
- Occupation(s): Pianist, Orchestra conductor, Composer
- Instrument: Piano
- Years active: 1918–1953

Miguel Angel Sandoval Cabrera (3 November 1902 – 24 August 1953), was a Guatemalan-born American pianist, conductor and composer. He spoke Spanish, English, French, and Italian. His musical works contributed greatly to both countries, and he is viewed as a musical ambassador of Guatemala.

== Early life ==
Miguel Sandoval was born in the town of Guazacapán, Guatemala (in the department of Santa Rosa) on November 3, 1902. Fray Angel Cabrera, who was a priest and his mother's uncle, supervised Sandoval's primary education. Sandoval's musical resources were limited in the small town where he grew up. He had access to a home piano, which he began playing when he was age 10, the church harmonium, and two phonographs owned by wealthy members of the community. As a young boy, he was fascinated by the military bands and marimba orchestras who played on national holidays and feast days.

In 1912, Sandoval and his mother moved to Guatemala City, where he attended the private Anglo-German high school. In 1917, an earthquake devastated Guatemala City, leaving buildings in rubble and thousands of Guatemalans homeless. All schools in Guatemala City were closed, so with the help of Fray Cabrera, Sandoval enrolled in St. John's College, a Jesuit school in the neighboring city of Belice. At age 14, Sandoval was able to help pay his school expenses by teaching piano at St. John's. Sandoval stayed at St. John's for two years, briefly returned to Guatemala City, and then traveled on a steamer to the United States.

== Journey to the United States ==
In 1918, Sandoval arrived in New York City with nothing but $50 in his pocket. At this time, New York was just entering the Roaring Twenties – with rise of jazz, the foxtrot, the Charleston, and the tango. The United States was in a time of musical transition, due to the growing popularity of the phonograph and the radio. In New York City, Sandoval worked as an arranger, choral coach, and pianist for the Italian Theatre Circuit of New York, playing piano in small theatres and nightclubs on the side. In addition, he published a few of his musical works, which were mostly arrangements of Italian folk songs. At this time, Dime Mari? appeared in sheet music, pianola roll, and disc.

After six years in the United States, Sandoval became a U.S. citizen. With the help of Mario Cozzi, a tenor and secretary to Giuseppe Bambosheck, conductor at the Metropolitan Opera Sandoval became the assistant conductor of the Met. He held this post for two seasons during the era of Gatti-Casazza. Sandoval also became a member of ASCAP, The American Society of Composers, Authors, and Publishers.

On September 26, 1926, Sandoval made his debut as a U.S. concert artist in an appearance with Carmen Ponselle at City Hall in Meriden, Connecticut. After that performance, he became an accompanist and virtuoso pianist, and his compositions were added to many musicians’ repertoires. These musicians included: Lawrence Tibbett, Gloria Swanson, Dorothy Kirsten, Licia Albanese, Giovanni Martinelli, Leonard Warren, Grace Moore, Rosa Ponselle, Ezio Pinza, and Bidu Sayão.

In 1927, Sandoval signed a contract with the Italian tenor, Beniamino Gigli. The two toured extensively and gave as many as sixty concerts a year. They performed in all 48 states, including Havana, Cuba. Sandoval wrote two songs for Gigli to be performed in concert: Vurria and Eres Tú. Eres Tú was recorded on an RCA Victor label, along with Sandoval's arrangement of a tango in D by Albéniz, called Quisiera Olvidar Tus Ojos. The association between Sandoval and Gigli was extremely beneficial for Sandoval, as he began attracting a group of admirers similar to that of Gigli. On January 21, 1931, in Toronto, Ontario, a reviewer wrote: “Mr. Miguel Sandoval’s piano-forte work was just as remarkable as Mr. Gigli’s beautiful songs. There have been few accompanists in Massey Hall who played more exquisitely, with more refined self-forgetfulness, and with more real understanding of the singer’s moods and needs than he did.” Between his tours, Sandoval coached singers at his New York Studio, and in 1927, the New York radio station, WCDA, named him Artistic Director.

== Family life ==
In 1928, Sandoval married Fedora Cozzi, who was originally from Florence, Italy. Cozzi was well connected with Italian musical circles in New York and was the sister of famous musician, Mario Cozzi. Cozzi became Sandoval's strongest support, as she traveled with him, safeguarded his manuscripts, and encouraged him through the difficulties of the Great Depression. Sandoval and Cozzi had a daughter together, named Manola Bendfeldt née Sandoval, who was born on August 24, 1929.

== Tours around the United States ==
In 1932, Sandoval's association with Gigli ended as a result of the Metropolitan Opera's request for Gigli to take a salary cut. Sandoval was then taken on as an accompanist to Nino Martini, a young, charismatic singer who was eagerly sought after. The two toured together throughout the United States and Canada, performing Sandoval's compositions, including Papillon, Cuban Dance, and Tarantelle. Other performance pieces included Campanella by Liszt-Busoni and Reflets dans L’Eau by Debussy.

After his tours, Sandoval became even more popular. He spent his time between New York and Hollywood and began composing songs for films. He composed Delusione for the movie Here’s to Romance and the score for the film Gay Desperado, in which he also appeared on screen as an orchestra leader. Additionally, Sandoval wrote the following popular songs: Adios Mi Tierra, Sin Tu Amor, and Ave Maria, Sandoval also wrote background music for travel films, sports shorts, and newsreels.

Meanwhile, Sandoval kept busy in the Eastern United States as well, arranging special operatic adaptations for the New York radio station, WOR. He also conducted operatic performances for the Chicago Opera Company at the Hippodrome in New York, the Century Grand Opera in Providence, Rhode Island, the Cola Santo Associated Artists at the Cosmopolitan Theatre in New York, and the Cincinnati Opera Company at Nippert Stadium in Ohio.

From 1940 until 1947, Sandoval worked as a composer, conductor, and pianist for the Columbia Broadcasting System, where he wrote music and conducted for '’Hacia un Mundo Mejor’’, '’Radioteatro’’, Contraespionaje’’, and ‘Viva America’’- in collaboration with the musical director Alfredo Antonini and the accordionist John Serry Sr. These were all transmitted through the shortwave to Spanish-speaking audiences around the world as part of the State Department's cultural diplomacy initiatives during World War II. Additionally, Sandoval composed numerous popular songs, which were performed by the Pan American Orchestra and the Orquesta Tipica. Included among them was his composition Chapinita, which was recorded in 1946 by the Viva America Orchestra conducted by Alfredo Antonini with the accordionist John Serry Sr. on the album Latin American Music for Alpha Records (Catalog # 12206A, 12206B).

== Return to Guatemala ==
Even throughout his time and success in the United States, Sandoval remained affectionate for his native country of Guatemala. In 1946, he returned to Guatemala with his family and discovered that his childhood friend, Juan José Arevalo had been inaugurated president the year before. During his visit, Sandoval accepted the post of director of the National Radio Station, TGW. Sandoval wanted to use TGW as a tool to help broaden and strengthen the cultural and musical life of his country. He formed the TGW Orchestra and developed a series of classical and folk music programs to be transmitted throughout Guatemala. One of his favorite projects was a shortwave program called Chapinlandia, which was created to reach Guatemalans living abroad. Sandoval composed a short instrumental piece, called Chipinitas, which became the program's theme song. In 1947, Sandoval composed a prelude to honor the Guatemalan musicologist, Jesús Castillo. This piece won first prize at the Quetzaltenango Floral Games that year.

During Arevelo's term in office, cultural effervescence spread throughout Guatemala, and a new Guatemalan Ballet Company and a National Opera Company were established. Performances for these new organizations were scheduled in June, July, and August, and this enabled them to attract many talented U.S. artists, as the summer months were slower in the U.S. music industry. Sandoval worked as the producer, promoter, and accountant for the Opera Company. During his time at the Opera Company, he hired young Guatemalan performers, giving them exciting, new opportunities.

== Return to the United States ==
In 1949, Sandoval signed a contract with the National Concert Artists Corporation of New York and return to the United States in 1951. There he worked with the New York Philharmonic Orchestra and the Lewisohn Stadium Orchestra. Additionally, he produced operas in Havana, Cuba.

On July 21, 1953, Sandoval suffered a severe heart attack while conducting a rehearsal of his Danza del Contrabandista in Lewisohn Stadium Orchestra. A month later, on August 24, 1953, Sandoval died at Knickerbocker Hospital in New York.

== Legacy ==
Sandoval's death was reported on the front page of the New York Times. The catalogue of his compositions includes seven piano works, twenty art songs, two Spanish song cycles, and a collection of twenty-five Latin American songs arranged for voice and piano.

The collection of Sandoval's works, became the property of Manola Sandoval Bendfeldt (d. 18 Jan 2023), of Mclean, Virginia, and contains instrumental compositions in manuscript, choral arrangements, film music, and even commercial jingles. His most famous works were his Spanish art songs, his ‘’Little Pedro Suite’’, a series of Latin American children's songs, and his orchestral Danza del Contrabandista.

Sandoval was able to produce an impressive number of published compositions, even while working as an accompanist and a conductor. He was inspired by popular and folk music of Spain, and he used idiomatic melodies for his themes. His musical style followed De Falla, Albéniz, and Granados of Spain, but he was never afraid to write music the way he felt, whether or not the style was popular at the time. He composed in a conventional manner, always valuing fluidity and melody in his compositions. Miguel Sandoval's music was so influential that it is still performed all over the world.

== Works, Editions, and Recordings ==
- Eres Tú (1932) - published by Southern Music Publishing New York and first performed by Beniamino Gigli
- Quisiera Olvidar Tus Ojos (1934) - published by Southern Music Publishing New York and first performed by Beniamino Gigli

External audio
- You may hear Miguel Sandoval's bolero "Eres Tu" performed by Beniamino Gigli in 1932; Here on Archive.org

- Delusione (1934) - published by New York Sam Fox Publishing Company and first performed by Nino Martini
- Song, The Soul of Life (1935) - published by G. Ricordi and first performed by Mario Cozzi
- Sin tu Amor (1936) - published by G. Shirmann and first recorded by Nino Martini
- Dulces Recuerdos (1936) - published by G. Shirmann and first performed by Bruna Castagna
- Yo Hasta El Cielo Daria (1936) - published by Alfred Music Co. and first performed by Mario Cozzi
- I Come To You (1936) - published by G. Ricordi and first performed by Rosa Ponselle
- Adios Mi Tierra (1936) - published by Sam Fox Publishing Co. and first performed by Nino Martini
- Danza (1937) - published by G. Shirmann and first performed by Miguel Sandoval
- Petite Valse (1938) - published by G. Shirmann and first performed by Miguel Sandoval
- La Mariposa (1939) - published by Sandon E. BI Marks and first performed by Sandor
- Long, Long Ago (1939) - published by G. Shirmann and first performed by Bidu Sayao
- Vola Farfalletta (1940) - published by G. Shirmann and first performed by Bidu Sayao
- Serenata Gitana (1940) - published by G. Shirmann and first performed by Vivian Della Chiessa
- Madrigal (1941) - published by G. Shirmann and first performed by Bruna Castagna
- Tus Besos (1942) - published by Alfred Music Co. and first performed by Pan American Orchestra
- El Mercado De Las Esclavas (1943) - published by Delkas Music and first performed by Bidu Sayao
- La Reja (1943) - published by G. Shirmann New York and first performed by G. Schirmann
- Novelette (1944) - published by G. Shirmann New York and first performed by Leonard Warren
- Recuerdos (1944) - published by Robbins International and first performed by Nestor Chayres
- Lament (1944) - published by G. Ricordi and first performed by Bidu Sayao
- Christ the Redeemer (1946) - published by G. Ricordi
- Mañana (1946) - published by Melo Music
- Tempos Fugit (1946) - published by Melo Music & Keith Prowaw and Co.
- Himno Nacional de Guatemala (1949) - published by Ministerio de Educacion Publica and performed by Orquesta y Coro de la Opera Nacional de Guatemala
- April
- Dime Mari?
- Vurria - performed by Beniamino Gigli
- Papillon - performed by Nino Martini
- Cuban Dance - performed by Nino Martini
- Tarantelle - performed by Nino Martini
- Ave Maria - performed by Rosa Ponselle
- Hacia un Mundo Mejor
- Radioteatro
- Contraespionaje
- Viva America
- Chapinita
- Divagando
