= The Gay Desperado =

1936 film by Rouben Mamoulian

- Publicity poster
- Directed by: Rouben Mamoulian
- Screenplay by: Wallace Smith
- Story by: Leo Birinsky
- Produced by: Mary Pickford; Jesse L. Lasky
- Starring: Ida Lupino; Leo Carrillo; Nino Martini
- Cinematography: Lucien Andriot
- Edited by: Margaret Clancey
- Music by: Alfred Newman
- Distributed by: United Artists
- Release date: October 2, 1936
- Running time: 86 minutes
- Country: United States
- Language: English

The Gay Desperado is a 1936 American musical-comedy film starring Ida Lupino, Leo Carrillo, and Nino Martini and directed by Rouben Mamoulian, produced by Mary Pickford and Jesse Lasky and originally released by United Artists. The film is a spoof of the Hollywood gangster genre.

The Gay Desperado earned the New York Film Critics Circle award for Best Director of 1936 for Mamoulian.

The film was restored by the UCLA Film & Television Archive and the Mary Pickford Foundation, and released on DVD in 2006 by Milestone Pictures after being out of distribution for many years.

Portions of the film were shot in Tucson, Arizona and show the old adobe quarter Barrio Libre of 19th Century Tucson and Mission San Xavier del Bac.

== Plot ==
Gangsters in a speeding car pummel and throw a snitch from the vehicle. The camera pulls back and we discover we are viewing a film within a film, the setting of a little movie theater in rural Mexico. The audience is unimpressed by the B-rated feature, but the leader of local small-time thugs, Braganza, is enthused and wishes to emulate the movie gangsters. When he shouts his approval the theater patrons try to silence him, and a fight breaks out. The manager orders his vaudeville stage singer Chivo, to begin his operatic singing act to quell the riot. Braganza is deeply moved by his singing, and invites Chivo to join his gang. When the singer demurs, they take him to the local radio station to perform.

Fleeing from the Federales with Chivo, the gang and some authentic American mobsters encounter a young couple driving an expensive convertible and hold them for ransom: Jane and Bill, a wealthy American. The plan goes awry, and Braganza blames Chivo, who has fallen in love with Jane, and decides to execute him by firing squad. Facing death, Chivo sings his death song, and Braganza relents. Jane and Chivo escape, are recaptured by the gang, and ultimately find true love. Braganza’s inept gang is last seen escaping into the sunset with the police in pursuit.

== Cast ==
- Ida Lupino as Jane
- Leo Carrillo as Pablo Braganza
- Nino Martini as Chivo
- Harold Huber as Juan Campo
- James Blakeley as Bill Shay
- Stanley Fields as Butch
- Mischa Auer as Diego

== Songs ==
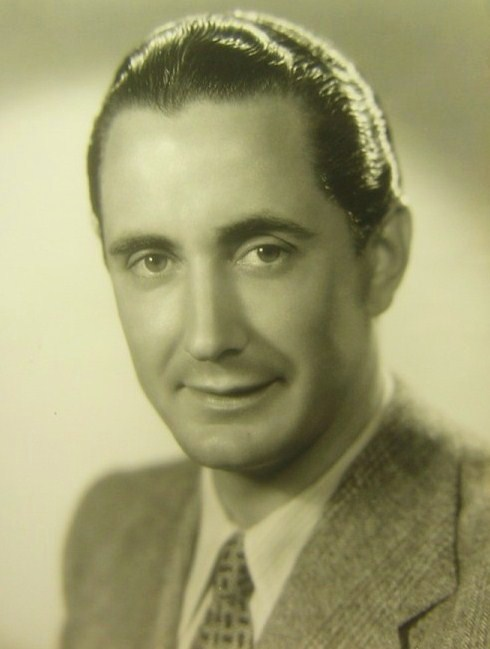
Nino Martini

All songs are sung by tenor Nino Martini in the role of Chivo.

- “The World is Mine Tonight”
- ”Celeste Aida”
- ”Adios Mi Terra”
- “Cielito Lindo”
- “Lamento Gitana”
- “Estrellita”

== Reception ==
Writing for The Spectator in 1936, Graham Greene gave the film a good review, describing it as "one of the best light comedies of the year". Greene asserts that "Mr. Mamoulian's camera is very persuasive" and together with the film's "careful compositions" and the overall intent of the film he summarizes the film as having "a framework of fine and mannered prose".

== Retrospective appraisal ==
Though The Gay Desperado was fulsomely praised upon its initial release, biographer Kurt Jensen reminds viewers that its “cleverness has faded.”

Film historian Tom Milne notes that the scenario for The Gay Desperado was not “particularly promising material,” but considers its handling by director Rouben Mamoulian decisive: “He bolsters a tolerably witty script making it funnier than it is by his prolific invention.” Milne adds: “The film can still give a head start to any other Thirties musical and still win hands down” but concludes that The Gay Desperado is “of no great consequence” with respect to Mamoulion’s oeuvre. Film historian Marc Spergel credits Mamoulian for working up some “slight, formulaic material” to deliver “a witty, fast-paced, and very stylish film.”

Both Milne and Spergel offer high praise for cinematographer Lucien Andriot’s capture of the southwestern landscape. Spergel ranks his images with that of American photographer Ansel Adams.
