= Music for Madame =

1937 film by John G. Blystone

- Theatrical release poster
- Directed by: John G. Blystone
- Screenplay by: Gertrude Purcell; Robert Harari
- Story by: Robert Harari
- Produced by: Jesse L. Lasky
- Starring: Nino Martini; Joan Fontaine; Alan Mowbray
- Cinematography: Joseph H. August
- Edited by: Desmond Marquette
- Music by: Nathaniel Shilkret
- Production company: Jesse L. Lasky Feature Play Company
- Distributed by: RKO Radio Pictures
- Release date: October 8, 1937
- Running time: 81 minutes
- Country: United States
- Language: English

Music for Madame is a 1937 American musical comedy film directed by John G. Blystone and written by Gertrude Purcell and Robert Harari. The film was released on October 8, 1937 by RKO Pictures.

== Plot ==
Singer Nino Maretti comes into Hollywood and is tricked by jewel thieves into distracting a rich audience, now he has to prove his innocence.

== Cast ==
- Nino Martini as Nino Maretti
- Joan Fontaine as Jean Clemens
- Alan Mowbray as Leon Rodowsky
- Billy Gilbert as Krause
- Alan Hale, Sr. as Detective Flugelman
- Grant Mitchell as District Attorney Ernest Robinson
- Erik Rhodes as Spaghetti Nadzio
- Lee Patrick as Nora Burns
- Romo Vincent as Gas Truck Driver
- Frank Conroy as Morton Harding
- Bradley Page as Rollins
- George Shelley as Mr. Barret
- Jack Carson as Assistant Director
