= Jean-Pierre Masson =

Canadian actor

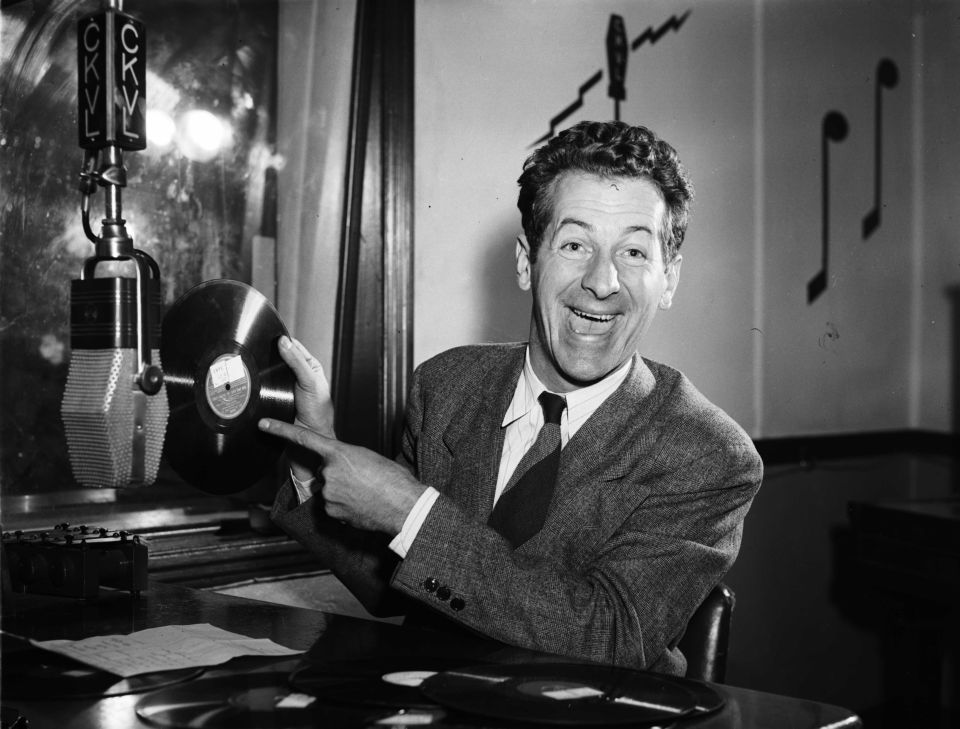
- Born: August 25, 1918; Sainte-Agathe-des-Monts, Quebec
- Died: March 11, 1995 (aged 76); Pottsville, Pennsylvania
- Occupation: Actor
- Known for: Les Belles Histoires des pays d'en haut

Jean-Pierre Masson (August 25, 1918 - March 11, 1995) was a Canadian film and television actor, best known for his long-running television role as Séraphin Poudrier in Les Belles Histoires des pays d'en haut.

Masson studied law at the Université de Montréal, where he was a classmate of Pierre Trudeau, and acted with the Compagnons de Saint-Laurent theatre troupe. Following his graduation, he pursued acting as a career instead of law, taking both stage and radio roles until being cast as Leonidas Plouffe in the television series The Plouffe Family in 1953 and as Mr. Jeneau in 14, rue de Galais in 1954. In 1956, he was cast in Les Belles Histoires, a series which lasted until 1970.

Following Les Belles Histoires, Masson had other supporting roles, including the films Don't Push It (Pousse mais pousse égal), Cordélia, A Scream from Silence (Mourir à tue-tête), Bound for Glory (Partis pour la gloire), Far from You Sweetheart (Je suis loin de toi mignonne), Why Rock the Boat?, Maria Chapdelaine and The Alley Cat (Le Matou), and the television series Terre humaine and He Shoots, He Scores. However, he was too strongly typecast by his longtime role as Séraphin Poudrier, and never had another major leading role.

Masson died in a motel room in Pottsville, Pennsylvania on March 11, 1995, while travelling to Florida. He was entombed at the Notre Dame des Neiges Cemetery in Montreal.
