= The Perfect Woman (1949 film) =

- Directed by: Bernard Knowles
- Written by: George Black; Bernard Knowles add. dialogue Basil Boothroyd
- Based on: play by Wallace Geoffrey; Basil Mitchell
- Produced by: Alfred Black; George Black
- Starring: Patricia Roc; Stanley Holloway; Nigel Patrick; Miles Malleson
- Cinematography: Jack Hildyard
- Edited by: Peter Graham Scott
- Music by: Arthur Wilkinson
- Production company: Two Cities Films
- Distributed by: General Film Distributors (UK); Eagle Lion (UK)
- Release dates: 23 May 1949 (London); April 1950 (USA)
- Running time: 87 minutes
- Country: United Kingdom
- Language: English
- Budget: £100,000

The Perfect Woman is a 1949 British farce comedy film directed by Bernard Knowles and starring Patricia Roc, Stanley Holloway and Nigel Patrick. It was written by George Black Jr, Knowles and J. B. Boothroyd, based on the play by Wallace Geoffrey and Basil Mitchell. The screenplay concerns a scientist who creates a robotic woman.

== Plot ==
Roger Cavendish is informed by his butler Ramshead that he is broke. They find an advertisement in The Times placed by Professor Ernest Belman, seeking help. They phone and arrange to meet. The professor has created a female robot, Olga, based on his niece, Penelope. Cavendish and Ramshead are tasked with looking after the robot for a week but are told they must never say the word "love" in front of it.

When Penelope's date cancels, the housekeeper Buttercup suggests she pretend to be the robot. Cavendish and Ramshead take her to a hotel and stay in the bridal suite, sparking many rumours amongst the staff. Cavendish's rich aunt arrives and thinks he has married. The robot is sent to help to explain things.

== Cast ==
- Patricia Roc as Penelope Belman
- Stanley Holloway as Ramshead
- Nigel Patrick as Roger Cavendish
- Miles Malleson as Professor Ernest Belman
- Irene Handl as Mrs. Butters (Buttercup), the professor's housekeeper
- Anita Sharp-Bolster as Lady Diana (billed as Anita Bolster)
- Fred Berger as Farini
- David Hurst as Wolfgang Winkel, the hotel waiter
- Pamela Devis as Olga the robot
- Jerry Verno as football fan on underground
- Johnnie Schofield as ticket collector
- Philippa Gill as Lady Mary
- Jerry Desmonde as dress shop manager
- Dora Bryan as model in shop
- Noel Howlett as scientist

== Original play ==
The original play debuted on 11 September 1948 and ran for 224 performances.

== Production ==
Roc was under contract to J. Arthur Rank at the time but left the organisation before the film was released. Filming took place in January 1949. The film was shot in 38 days at only three-quarters of its budgeted cost. It was made at Denham Studios with sets designed by James Elder Wills.

Pamela Devis was cast as the robot because of her resemblance to Roc.

Two Cities' executive producer Earl St John hoped to reunite Holloway, Patrick and Roc for a sequel, The Perfect Man. However no film resulted.

== Release ==
The film was released on a double bill, and given a West End screening. It proved popular and made a profit.

== Reception ==
The Monthly Film Bulletin wrote: "From beginning to end this film never falters, moving from one amusing situation to another with amazing rapidity, and provides first-class light entertainment. It is exceedingly well produced and directed, maintaining an even pace throughout; the dialogue is witty, the background music appropriate, and the whole is a superb piece of nonsensical fun. Nigel Patrick as Roger Cavendish is a very natural comedian, while Stanley Holloway makes a good stooge. Miles Malleson portrays the rather lovable but very absent-minded Professor Belmon, and Patricia Roc as Penelope, together with Irene Handl, Fred Berger, David Hurst and the remainder of the cast add their share to the hilarity of the film."

Kine Weekly wrote: "The picture is a little stagey in design, but the zest with which it is put over by the featured players and the accurate timing enable it to expand beyond the proscenium arch and smother its exuberant clichés with spontaneous laughs. Naughty but quite nice and agreeably staged, it would only dawn on the Censor to give it an "A." Thematically, it has been doing the rounds for years with never a smirk. In fact, its healthy tradition is one of its strongest recommendations."

Picture Show wrote: "Its obvious theatricalities are cloaked by the joyful gusto with which it is acted."

== Television version ==
The BBC broadcast a live adaptation of the Geoffrey and Mitchell play in the Sunday Night Theatre slot on 6 May 1956.
