= Rouben Mamoulian =

American film and theatre director (1897–1987)

- Ռուբեն Մամուլյան
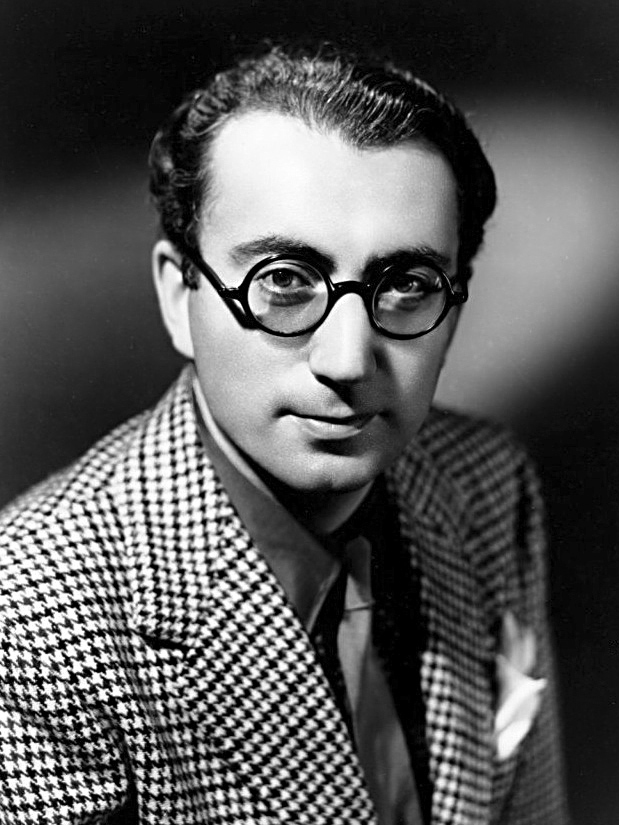
- Born: Rouben Zachary Mamoulian; October 8, 1897; Tiflis, Russian Empire (now Tbilisi, Georgia)
- Died: December 4, 1987 (aged 90); Los Angeles, California, U.S.
- Citizenship: United States
- Occupations: Film and stage director
- Years active: 1923-1963
- Spouse: Azadia Newman (m. 1945)

Rouben Zachary Mamoulian (October 8, 1897 – December 4, 1987) was an Armenian and American film and theater director.

Mamoulian's oeuvre includes sixteen films (four of which are musicals) and seventeen Broadway productions, six of which are musicals. He was responsible for the acclaimed original stagings of Oklahoma! (1943) and Carousel (1945), as well as the first production of George Gershwin's Porgy and Bess (1935).

His output in the early film sound era demonstrated his talent for deploying cinematic innovations that were startling in their day. He restored mobility to the camera, and developed his own signature use of montage, close-ups, split-screens and dissolves. Mamoulian's films garnered more in the way of critical acclaim than box office receipts: only six of his films earned a profit at their initial release: City Streets (1931), Dr. Jekyll and Mr. Hyde (1931), Love Me Tonight (1932), Queen Christina (1934), The Mark of Zorro (1940) and Blood and Sand (1941).

== Early life ==
Rouben Zachary Mamoulian (Armenian: Ռուբէն Զաքարի Մամուլեան) was born in Tiflis, Russian Empire (now Tbilisi, Georgia), to a family of Armenian descent. His mother, Virginie (née Kalantarian; Armenian: կոյս Քալանթարեան Մամուլեան), from a family of wealthy landowners and financiers, served as a director of the Armenian theatre. His father, Zachary (Armenian: Զաքարի Մամուլյան), was a bank president. They raised Mamoulian and his younger sister, Svetlana, in the Armenian Apostolic faith. By the time he was six, Mamoulian spoke three languages with equal fluency: Russian at home, Armenian at one grandmother’s, and Georgian at the other’s.

In the aftermath of the Russian Revolution of 1905, ethnic violence arose in Tiflis, and the family moved to Paris for three years, where Mamoulian became fluent in French. In 1915, his father enrolled him at the Imperial Moscow University to study law, but Mamoulian turned to literary pursuits and student stage productions. The Mamoulian family, sympathetic to the Czarist regime, fled Russia during the turmoil of the 1917 revolution and the ensuing civil war.

== Academic career ==
In 1923, Mamoulian accepted an invitation from George Eastman to become co-director of the American Opera Company in Rochester, New York, and taught at the Eastman School of Music. Mamoulian produced Carmen, Faust, Boris Godunov, as well as Gilbert and Sullivan and Viennese operettas.

In 1925, Mamoulian was head of the Eastman School's School of Dance and Dramatic Action, where Martha Graham taught for one year (1925–26). Among other performances, together they produced a short, two-color film titled The Flute of Krishna, featuring Eastman students. Mamoulian left Eastman shortly after (1926), Mamoulian recalled:

I was already seeking a truly dramatic theater, a theater that would combine all the elements of movement, dancing, acting, music, singing, decor, lighting and colour and so on."

In 1930, Mamoulian became a naturalized citizen of the United States.

== Stage career ==
Mamoulian began his Broadway director career with a production of Dorothy Heyward and DuBose Heyward's Porgy, which opened on October 10, 1927. He also directed Wings Over Europe from late 1928 to 1929. He directed the revival of Porgy in 1929 along with George Gershwin's operatic treatment Porgy and Bess, which opened on October 10, 1935. Mamoulian was also the first to stage such notable Broadway works as Oklahoma! (1943), Carousel (1945), and Lost in the Stars (1949).

== Film career ==
Mamoulian directed Applause, his first feature film, in 1929, which was one of the early efforts in "talkies". It was a landmark film owing to Mamoulian's innovative use of camera movement and sound.

His talents as a director were carried to his other films released in the 1930s. Dr. Jekyll and Mr. Hyde (1931) is widely considered the best version of Robert Louis Stevenson's tale. Queen Christina (1933) was the last film Greta Garbo made with John Gilbert; both benefit from being made before the Hays Code came into full force. The musical film Love Me Tonight was released in 1932.

He directed the first three-strip Technicolor film Becky Sharp (1935), based on Thackeray's Vanity Fair as well as the 1937 musical High, Wide and Handsome. His next two films earned him wide admiration, The Mark of Zorro (1940) and Blood and Sand (1941), both remakes of silent films.

Blood and Sand, about bullfighting, was filmed in Technicolor, and used color schemes based on the work of Spanish artists such as Diego Velázquez and El Greco. His foray into screwball comedy in 1942 was a success with Rings on Her Fingers starring Henry Fonda and Gene Tierney.

Mamoulian's last completed musical film was Metro-Goldwyn-Mayer's 1957 film version of the Cole Porter musical Silk Stockings. This was one of Porter's less successful stage musicals and was based on the 1939 Ninotchka. The film Silk Stockings starred Fred Astaire and Cyd Charisse, with Janis Paige and Peter Lorre in supporting roles.

Mamoulian's film directing career came to an end when he was fired or resigned from two consecutive films: Porgy and Bess (1959), for which Mamoulian had written a complete shooting script when the Goldwyn studios set burned to the ground. When production resumed, director Mamoulian had disagreements with producer Samuel Goldwyn, and was "fired". The second was Cleopatra (1963).

He previously had been fired as director of Laura (1944).

After directing the highly successful original stage productions of Oklahoma! and Carousel, he worked on only a few other theatrical productions, such as St. Louis Woman, which introduced Pearl Bailey to Broadway audiences.

He personally was recruited by Directors Guild of America (DGA) co-founder King Vidor in 1936 to help unionize fellow movie directors. Mamoulian's lifelong allegiance to the DGA, and more so his general unwillingness to compromise, contributed to his being targeted in the Hollywood blacklisting of the 1950s. From 1961, at age 64, until his death in 1987 at age 90, Mamoulian did not work professionally.

Mamoulian died on December 4, 1987, at the Motion Picture & Television Country House and Hospital of natural causes at age 90 in the Woodland Hills neighborhood of Los Angeles.

== Awards and honors ==
On February 8, 1960, for his contribution to the motion picture industry, he received a star on the Hollywood Walk of Fame at 1709 Vine Street.

He was inducted into the American Theatre Hall of Fame in 1981. In 1982 Mamoulian received a Lifetime Achievement Award from the Directors Guild of America.

In 2019, Mamoulian's film Becky Sharp was selected by the Library of Congress for preservation in the National Film Registry for being "culturally, historically, or aesthetically significant".

The Rouben Mamoulian Award for Best Director is given to an Australian short film at the Sydney Film Festival each year. The award was first presented by Mamoulian in 1974. As of 2025 the prize, sponsored by Dendy Cinemas, is worth A$7,000 in cash, and winners are eligible for Academy Award eligible.

== Filmography ==
As director

Year	Title	Production co.	Cast	Notes
1929	Applause	Paramount	Helen Morgan	
1931	City Streets	Paramount	Gary Cooper / Sylvia Sidney	
1931	Dr. Jekyll and Mr. Hyde	Paramount	Fredric March / Miriam Hopkins	
1932	Love Me Tonight	Paramount	Maurice Chevalier / Jeanette MacDonald	
1933	The Song of Songs	Paramount	Marlene Dietrich / Brian Aherne	
1933	Queen Christina	MGM	Greta Garbo / John Gilbert	
1934	We Live Again	Samuel Goldwyn Co.	Fredric March / Anna Sten	
1935	Becky Sharp	Pioneer Pictures	Miriam Hopkins / Cedric Hardwicke	first three-strip Technicolor film
1936	The Gay Desperado	Pickford-Lasky	Nino Martini / Ida Lupino / Leo Carrillo	
1937	High, Wide and Handsome	Paramount	Irene Dunne / Randolph Scott / Charles Bickford	
1939	Golden Boy	Columbia	Barbara Stanwyck / William Holden	
1940	The Mark of Zorro	20th Century-Fox	Tyrone Power / Linda Darnell	
1941	Blood and Sand	20th Century-Fox	Tyrone Power / Linda Darnell / Rita Hayworth	Technicolor film
1942	Rings on Her Fingers	20th Century-Fox	Gene Tierney / Henry Fonda	
1948	Summer Holiday	MGM	Mickey Rooney / Gloria DeHaven / Walter Huston / Agnes Moorehead / Frank Morgan / Marilyn Maxwell	Technicolor film
1957	Silk Stockings	MGM	Fred Astaire / Cyd Charisse	Metrocolor film

Other film work

Year	Title	Production co.	Cast	Notes
1944	Laura	20th Century-Fox	Gene Tierney / Clifton Webb / Dana Andrews	fired, footage unused
1952	The Wild Heart	David O. Selznick	Jennifer Jones	shot extra scenes for the U.S. version of Gone to Earth (GB 1950) / Technicolor film
1959	Porgy and Bess	Samuel Goldwyn Co.	Sidney Poitier / Dorothy Dandridge	fired, one scene used / Technicolor film
1963	Cleopatra	20th Century-Fox	Elizabeth Taylor / Richard Burton / Rex Harrison	resigned, footage unused / color film
