= The Romantic Age =

- Australian release poster
- Directed by: Edmond T. Gréville
- Screenplay by: Peggy Barwell; Edward Dryhurst
- Based on: Serge Véber (novel "Lycee des jeunes filles")
- Produced by: Edward Dryhurst; Eric L'Epine Smith
- Starring: Hugh Williams; Betty Astell; Petula Clark
- Cinematography: Hone Glendinning
- Music by: Charles Williams
- Production company: Pinnacle Productions
- Distributed by: General Film Distributors; Eagle-Lion Classics(US)
- Release dates: 29 November 1949 (UK); 1950 (US)
- Running time: 80 min
- Country: United Kingdom
- Language: English
- Budget: £115,000 or £119,400
- Box office: £30,000

The Romantic Age (U.S. title: Naughty Arlette) is a 1949 British drama film directed by Edmond T. Gréville and starring Hugh Williams, Mai Zetterling and Petula Clark. The screenplay by Peggy Barwell and Edward Dryhurst was based on the novel Lycee des Jeunes Filles by Serge Véber.

== Plot ==
Middle-aged Arnold Dickson is an art master who joins the staff of the girls' school in which his daughter Julie is enrolled. He soon finds himself the target of Arlette, a sophisticated French exchange student who has more than education on her mind. On a dare, she seduces the professor into running off to Paris with her, a plot derailed by Julie when she orchestrates a scheme designed to help him put the affair into perspective.

== Principal cast ==
- Hugh Williams as Arnold Dickson
- Mai Zetterling as Arlette
- Petula Clark as Julie Dickson
- Margot Grahame as Helen Dickson
- Carol Marsh as Patricia
- Raymond Lovell as Hedge
- Paul Dupuis as Henri Sinclair
- Margaret Barton as Bessie
- Marie Ney as Miss Hallam
- Mark Daly as Withers

== Critical reception ==
The Monthly Film Bulletin wrote: "Blundering comedy of an art master who joins the staff of a gitls' finishing school and is vamped by one of the pupils with embarrassing results to a number of people, especially the audience."

Kine Weekly wrote: "The picture, padded out with dormitory tittle-tattle, contains little to justify its more than useful cast and expensive sets. For reasons unexplained, Helen always tickles the ivories whenever Arnold enters his home and as far as we could see the only valid excuse he had for leaving his family was that he was allergic to the piano. We've seldom sat through such pretentious piffie."

Picture Show wrote: "This story, adapted from the French, has lost its lightness in the translation. Robbed of this, what would have been a romantic comedy with the underlying warning of a dangerous situation, becomes a three-cornered drama with the threat of a complete domestic disaster."

Picturegoer wrote: "Flimsy, but in parts not unamusing trifle ... It's very theatrical. ... Mai Zetterling has an unsuitable role for her as the French girl and Hugh Williams is suitably stodgy as the master. His wife is well characterized by Margot Grahame and Petula Clark is charming and ingenuous as his daughter.

Today's Cinema described the film as a "rather dull story" that "lacks the sparkle and fun that would have widened its appeal ... Mai Zetterling is too mature for the role of Arlette, for her mannerisms become irritating and her attitude quite absurd. Petula Clark is much more successful as the master's charming daughter Julie, for she has been given a role suited to her age and experience ... The Romantic Age should amuse adolescents who may be more able to appreciate its point but it is unlikely to be equally entertaining to adults."

Variety wrote: "The plot makes no pretense at sophistication and much of the talent garnered for the production is restricted in scope. There is, however, a piquant charm which will appeal mostly to teenagers. Direction is straightforward, without attempting to be imaginative, and production qualities are up to standard. Mai Zetterling romps through the part of the French schoolgirl who plays havoc with her teacher's emotion. Her performance is not up to her usual mature standard, but she gives all that the part demands. Hugh Williams is heavy as the teacher who has reached the romantic age. Margot Grahame turns in a neat study as his long-suffering wife, and Petula Clark is okay in the role of their misunderstood daughter."

TV Guide rated the film 2/4 stars and wrote: "It's not a particularly tasteful theme, nor is the comedy handled with the wit necessary to pull it off. The results are fairly pedestrian and lack any real style".
