= Afterglow (1997 film) =

- Directed by: Alan Rudolph
- Written by: Alan Rudolph
- Produced by: Robert Altman; James McLindon
- Starring: Nick Nolte; Julie Christie; Lara Flynn Boyle; Jonny Lee Miller
- Cinematography: Toyomichi Kurita
- Edited by: Suzy Elmiger
- Music by: Mark Isham
- Production company: Moonstone Entertainment
- Distributed by: Sony Pictures Classics
- Release dates: May 11, 1997 (Cannes); December 26, 1997 (United States)
- Running time: 113 minutes
- Country: United States
- Language: English
- Budget: $9 million
- Box office: $2,465,960

Afterglow is a 1997 American comedy-drama film directed and written by Alan Rudolph and starring Nick Nolte, Julie Christie, Lara Flynn Boyle, and Jonny Lee Miller. It was produced by Robert Altman and filmed in Montreal.

Christie's performance earned her a nomination for the Academy Award for Best Actress. The film is about two married couples who end up attracted to each other's partners. Rudolph called it "intentionally a grown-up cousin of Choose Me."

== Plot ==
The lives of two unhappily married couples intertwine in Montreal, Canada. The marriage between Lucky Mann, a contractor and his beautiful British wife, former actress Phyllis Hart, has been in a poor state for years. Their relationship fell apart when Phyllis revealed to Lucky that their daughter Cassie was not his biological child. She had her with an actor while Lucky was in the Navy. Cassie ran away to Montreal, and they have not spoken in years. The Manns moved from California to Montreal to find Cassie, but without success. Phyllis is depressed after learning that her daughter's father, actor Jack Dana, recently died. She begins to question her own mortality and goes to see a doctor for a checkup. She also spends her time watching her old films that she starred in with Dana. Phyllis knows Lucky cheats on her with his construction clients, and therefore they have a silent agreement that they will not have sex. Lucky is shown cheating on her with Gloria Marino.

Meanwhile, corporate executive Jeffrey Byron and his wife Marianne are also unhappily married. Marianne desires children and is starved of affection by Jeffrey, who seems only to be in love with himself. Jeffrey is depressed and seems to be contemplating his sexuality and, perhaps, suicide. One day after work, Marianne tries to get Jeffrey to have sex with her because she is ovulating, but he denies her. She decides to start preparing a room for a baby in their condo anyway and hires a contractor, who happens to be Lucky Mann, referred to her by her friend Isabel's mother Gloria. She is instantly attracted to him, and they begin an affair. Jeffrey meets Phyllis in a bar where Phyllis had just witnessed Marianne and Lucky on a date. Jeffrey is instantly attracted to Phyllis and seems to have a need to be with an older woman after having shown a sudden attraction to his older secretary, Helene. Marianne is attracted to the older and rugged Lucky. Jeffrey invites Phyllis away for a weekend at a resort. She initially says no and goes home to Lucky. Phyllis tries to sleep with Lucky and he brushes her off, so she tells him that she knows about Marianne. She ends up meeting Jeffrey and going away with him. Once they are at the resort, they meet up with Jeffrey's big cheese client, Bernard Ornay and his mistress Monica Bloom. Ornay also becomes attracted to Phyllis which causes a rift with Jeffrey. Jeffrey and Phyllis look likely to sleep together in her room, but Jeffrey terminates contact after Phyllis responds flirtatiously when Ornay knocks on her door. They leave the resort the next morning.

The two couples end up in the same hotel bar, and Jeffrey and Lucky have a physical fight. Marianne and Phyllis leave together and go back to the Byrons' apartment, where Marianne reveals she is pregnant with Lucky's baby. Marianne does not know yet that Phyllis is his wife. Phyllis becomes upset and leaves. Jeffrey and Marianne have sex and reconcile. Lucky finds Cassie and they reconcile. At the end of the story, the same thing that had happened to Phyllis has happened to Marianne. They will both have raised a child with another man that is not the father. Marianne tells her friend Isabel the baby's father is Jeffrey, which reveals she does not plan on telling Lucky that it is his, just as Phyllis had done with Jack Dana. The final scene shows Phyllis in bed crying, knowing that Marianne will have Lucky's baby, and emotional over Cassie coming home...

== Cast ==
- Nick Nolte as Lucky Mann
- Julie Christie as Phyllis Hart, a former actress, married to Lucky
- Lara Flynn Boyle as Marianne Byron
- Jonny Lee Miller as Jeffrey Byron
- Jay Underwood as Donald Duncan, Jeffrey's friend
- Domini Blythe as Helene Pelletier, Jeffrey's secretary
- Yves Corbeil as Bernard Ornay, a business associate of Jeffrey
- Alan Fawcett as Jack Dana, an actor
- Michele Barbara-Pelletier as Isabel Marino, Marianne's friend
- France Castel as Gloria Marino, Isabel's mother
- Genevieve Bissonette, as Cassie, daughter of Phyllis and Jack Dana
- Claudia Besso as Monica Bloom, Bernard's mistress
- Ellen David as Judy, the waitress

== Production ==
Rudolph later said "I wrote Afterglow out of survival. I intentionally wrote something that was small." Rudolph elaborated:

I got an idea about two couples who didn’t know each other where each meets their opposite. That was the clothes line I could start hanging things on. You can make a case that this is really about one couple. It’s really just a page out of the diary of marriage in general. The ups-and-downs, the ins-and-outs, the circles. It’s about love. Where does love exist? Our lives are really more emotional reality than anything else, but we’re denied to be able to indulge in that because there’s no tangibility. I thought I’d make an emotional movie about four people in different emotional time zones.

Rudolph said "Miss Christie definitely is one of the handful of great modern cinema actresses and Nolte is as good as it gets as far as I'm concerned."

Filming took place in Montreal. "I'm as proud of the film as I can be," he said.

== Critical reception ==
The film received positive reviews from critics and holds a 77% approval rating on aggregate review site Rotten Tomatoes, with an average score of 6.8 out of 10, based on 31 collected reviews. Metacritic, which uses a weighted average, assigned the film a score of 68 out of 100, based on 22 critics, indicating "generally favorable" reviews.

=== Awards ===
Julie Christie was nominated for Best Actress in a Lead Role in the 1997 Academy Awards for her role. She won best actress at the San Sebastian Film Festival. The cast won the jury award for best ensemble performance at the Fort Lauderdale International Film Festival, and Nick Nolte won the best actor award at the same festival.
