= Fugitive from Montreal =

1950 film by Jean Devaivre

- Directed by: Jean Devaivre
- Written by: Jean Devaivre; Charles Exbrayat
- Produced by: Paul L'Anglais
- Cinematography: Philippe Agostini
- Edited by: Jacques Grassi
- Music by: Joseph Kosma
- Production companies: Québec Production; Éclectiques Films
- Distributed by: Les Films Fernand Rivers; France Film
- Release date: 1950
- Running time: 112 minutes
- Countries: Canada; France
- Language: French

Fugitive from Montreal (French: L'inconnue de Montréal) is a 1950 French-Canadian drama film directed by Jean Devaivre, written by Charles Exbrayat, and starring René Dary, Patricia Roc and Paul Dupuis. A Royal Canadian Mounted Police officer tries to prevent a former wartime comrade from France becoming mixed up with criminal activities. It was released in Canada on 17 November 1950 and in France on 17 August 1951.

== Cast ==
- René Dary – Pierre Chambrac
- Patricia Roc – Helene Bering
- Paul Dupuis – Paul Laforet
- Albert Miller – Anton
