= Andrée Basilières =

Canadian actress

Andrée Basilières (April 14, 1915 – May 10, 2007) was a Canadian actress from Quebec. She was best known for portraying Angélique in the television drama Les Belles Histoires des pays d'en haut from 1956 to 1970.

She was born in Montreal. She first appeared in the play L'Aiglon by Edmond Rostand. Basilières appeared in a number of television series, including 14, rue de Galais, Je me souviens and Monsieur Gallet, décédé. Her last appearance on television was in a special broadcast of Viens voir les comédiens in December 2006 featuring performers from Les Belles Histoires des pays d'en haut.

She was married to Dimitri Ionesco.

Basilières died from respiratory problems at the Royal Victoria Hospital in Montreal at the age of 92.
