= Yves Corbeil =

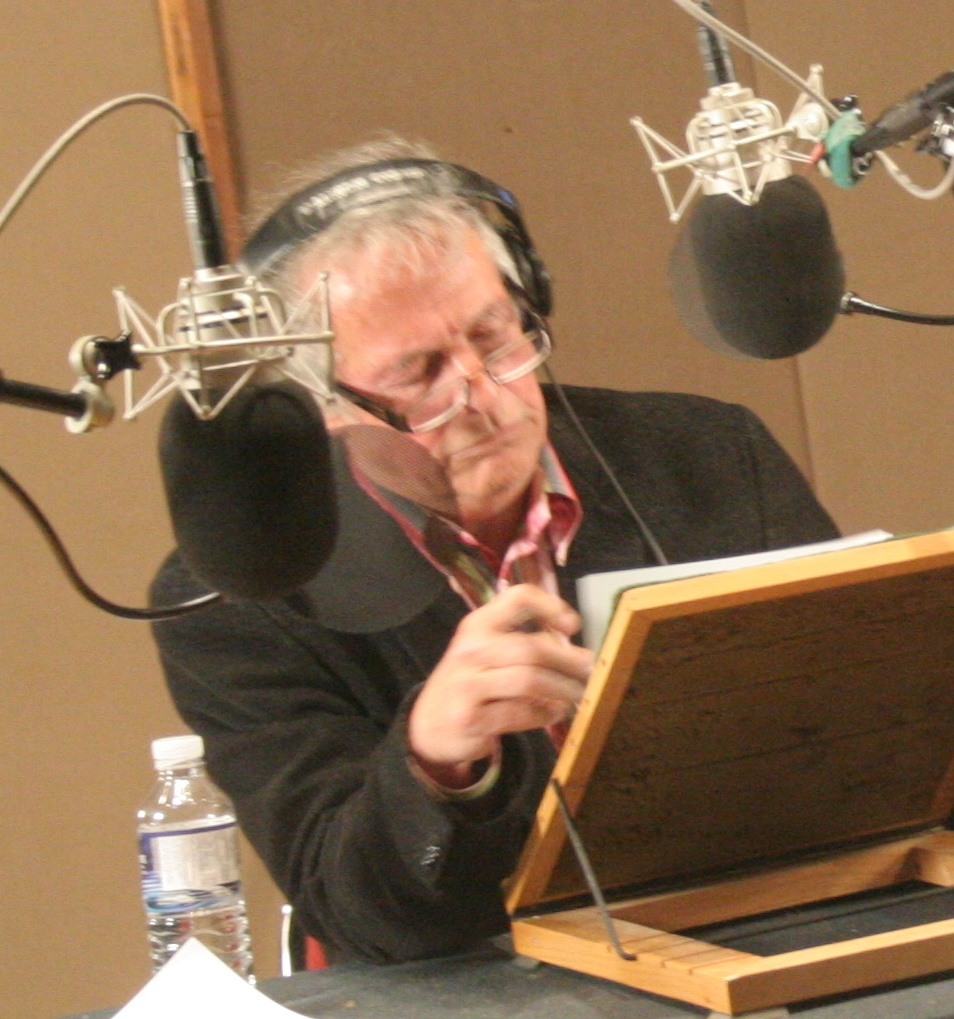
- Corbeil voice recording L'Entrevue in 2010
- Born: July 18, 1944 (age 81); Saint-Eugène, Quebec, Canada
- Occupations: Actor; voice actor; Television Host

Yves Corbeil (born July 18, 1944) is a Canadian actor and television host. He is currently known as the game show host of the Loto-Québec televised show La Roue de Fortune (albeit a different version of Wheel of Fortune). He was born in Saint-Eugène, Quebec.

== Biography ==
Since starting his career as television host in 1964, Corbeil has appeared in over 100 Quebec shows of various genres. Among the most notable shows he participated included Salut, Bonjour!, Fais-moi un dessin, Souvenirs d'été and Roue de Fortune, the latter one in which he is still the host. He is also a spokesperson for the Loto-Québec lottery corporation which airs on TQS.

In addition to his work as host, Corbeil has been an actor since 1956. Corbeil played in several television series including Les Belles Histoires des pays d'en haut, Peau de banane in 1982 and Virginie in 1996. He also appeared in the movies Afterglow in 1999 and Le Collectionneur in 2002. He provided narration in the Human Condition which earned him a Jutra Award nomination in 1999 although it was Michel Forget who won the Award for best narration in Hécatombe chez Marie-Pierre

Corbeil also provided the voice in French-translated versions in several movies in the roles of Fred Flintstone in The Flintstones as well as Mr. Freeze in Batman and Robin, Darth Sidious in Star Wars as well as the Terminator in Terminator 3: Rise of the Machines and various characters in The Simpsons. Among the actors he provided the French voice included Morgan Freeman, Arnold Schwarzenegger, Tim Allen, John Goodman and Gene Hackman.

Corbeil also worked as a teacher in Saint-Jérôme, Quebec in humanity sciences and religion in the 1960s. He also participated in various theatrical plays throughout his career. He is also participating in various advertisements for Corbeil Home Appliances.

== Filmography ==
=== Television series and movies ===
- Les Belles Histoires des pays d'en haut - 1970
- Trouble-Maker (Trouble-fête) - 1964
- Rue des pignons - 1966–1977
- Le paradis terrestre - 1968
- Les Berger - 1970
- Le Doux sauvage - 1970
- Peau de banane - 1982
- La Fille du Maquignon - 1990
- Virginie - 1996
- Afterglow - 1997
- Bob Million - 1997
- Lobby - 1997
- Sauve qui peut - 1997
- The Human Condition - 1999
- Lost and Found - 2000
- The Collector (Le Collectionneur) - 2002
- Éternel - 2004
- Good Morning Chuck (Bon matin Chuck, ou l'art de réduire les méfaits) - 2023

=== Short films ===
- T is for Turbo (2011)

=== Shows ===
- Télé-Jeunes (1964-???)
- Fais-moi un dessin (1987–1991)
- Caméra-café (2003)
- Salut, Bonjour!
- La Roue de fortune
