= Byline (disambiguation) =

A byline indicates the name of the author of a newspaper or magazine article.

Byline may also refer to:

- Byline (TV series), 1950s mystery series
- By-Line: Ernest Hemingway, a 1967 collection of newspaper articles by Ernest Hemingway
- Byline Bank, Chicago-based bank
- Byline (soccer), the portion of a goal line outside the goalposts in a football pitch
- A touch-line or sideline in sports
- Byline Times, an online newspaper
- Byline (magazine), a digital magazine

== See also ==
- Dateline (disambiguation)
- Byliner, an imprint of Pronoun publishing platform
