= The Broken Melody (1929 film) =

1929 British film by Fred Paul

- Directed by: Fred Paul
- Written by: Herbert Keith (play); James Leader (play); Thomas Coutts Elder; Fred Paul
- Starring: Georges Galli; Andrée Sacré; Enid Stamp-Taylor; Cecil Humphreys
- Cinematography: Bernard Knowles
- Production company: Welsh-Pearson
- Distributed by: Paramount Pictures
- Release date: October 1929
- Running time: 6,414 feet
- Country: United Kingdom
- Languages: Sound (Synchronized); English Intertitles

The Broken Melody is a sound 1929 British romance film directed by Fred Paul and starring Georges Galli, Andrée Sacré and Enid Stamp-Taylor. While the film has no audible dialog, it features a synchronized musical score, singing and sound effects on the soundtrack. The film was shot at Cricklewood Studios and distributed by Paramount Pictures. It was based on a play by Herbert Keith and James Leader. An exiled Prince living in Paris, begins a daliance with an opera singer before returning to his wife.

== Cast ==
- Georges Galli as Prince Paul
- Andrée Sacré as Bianca
- Enid Stamp-Taylor as Gloria
- Cecil Humphreys as Gen. Delange
- Mary Brough as Marthe
- Albert Brouett as Jacques

== See also ==
- List of early sound feature films (1926–1929)

== Bibliography ==
- Low, Rachael. History of the British Film, 1918-1929. George Allen & Unwin, 1971.
