= Paul Dupuis =

French Canadian film actor (1913–1976)

- Postcard of Paul Dupuis
- Born: August 11, 1913; Montreal, Québec, Canada
- Died: January 23, 1976 (aged 62); St-Sauveur, Québec, Canada
- Occupation: Actor
- Years active: 1943–1968 (film & TV)
- Spouse: Jacqueline Godin
- Children: 2

Paul Dupuis (August 11, 1913 – January 23, 1976) was a French Canadian film actor who was born in Montreal, Quebec, Canada, and who performed in British films during the late 1940s. The roles he played were mainly as the romantic leading man. He died in Saint-Sauveur in Quebec.

His films include Johnny Frenchman (1945), The White Unicorn (1947), La Forteresse (1947), Sleeping Car to Trieste (1948), Passport to Pimlico (1949), The Romantic Age (1949), The Reluctant Widow (1950), and Tit-Coq (1953). He was also seen in the popular Quebec television series Les Belles Histoires des pays d'en haut.

== Filmography ==
Year	Title	Role	Notes
1943	Yellow Canary	Paul, Intelligence Officer	Uncredited
1945	Johnny Frenchman	Yan Kervarec	
1946	The Laughing Lady	Poerre	
1947	La forteresse	Michel Lacoste	
1947	The White Unicorn	Paul	
1948	Against the Wind	Picquart	
1948	Sleeping Car to Trieste	Detective Inspector Jolif	
1949	Passport to Pimlico	Duke of Burgundy	
1949	Madness of the Heart	Paul de Vandiere	
1949	The Romantic Age	Henri Sinclair	
1950	The Reluctant Widow	Lord Nivelle	
1950	Fugitive from Montreal (L'inconnue de Montréal)	Paul Laforêt	
1952	The Immortal Scoundrel (Étienne Brûlé gibier de potence)	Étienne Brûlé	
1953	Tit-Coq	Padre	
1955	Passion de femmes	Alain Tournier	
1955	Napoleon	Neipperg	Uncredited
1955	The Babes Make the Law (Les pépées font la loi)	Georges, le mari d'Elvire	
