= Village de Séraphin =

- Location within Central Quebec
- Established: 1967
- Dissolved: May 30, 1999
- Location: 300-350, rue Séraphin; Sainte-Adèle, Quebec, Canada
- Coordinates: 45°58′21″N 74°09′59″W
- Type: Living museum

The Village de Séraphin is a former Canadian open-air museum inspired by the television drama Les Belles Histoires des pays d'en haut, with more than eighteen houses to visit, located from No. 300 to No. 350, rue Séraphin in Sainte-Adèle.

== History ==
In 1965, Fernand Montplaisir, a pharmacist from Sainte-Adèle, bought land where Claude-Henri Grignon had located the house of Séraphin Poudrier, to build the Village de Séraphin. For $50,000, he obtained the rights to use the characters of Claude-Henri Grignon.

The Village de Séraphin was inaugurated in 1967, with initially eight post-and-plank houses bought in the vicinity of Sainte-Adèle and rebuilt in the village. In this first season, more than 100,000 people visited the place.

In 1977, the Village de Séraphin had 17 houses to visit.

Fernand Montplaisir inaugurated in 1983 a new park called Pays des Merveilles, located near the site of the Village de Séraphin.

In the mid-1980s, the château de la riche héritière was built, bringing the number to eighteen houses to visit.

Following the death of her husband Fernand Montplaisir in January 1998, Thérèse Montplaisir tried to sell the village, but without success.

On May 30, 1999, the Village de Séraphin was opened to the public for the last time and sold at auction.
