= André Thomas (cinematographer) =

French cinematographer (1911–1956)

- Born: 25 December 1911; Plouaret, Côtes-d'Armor, France
- Died: 22 November 1956 (aged 44); Paris, Île-de-France, France
- Occupation: Cinematographer
- Years active: 1934–1956 (film)

André Thomas (25 December 1911 – 22 November 1956) was a French cinematographer. He worked on over forty film productions, mainly French with a handful of British films. He was married to the British actress Patricia Roc from 1949 until his death.

== Selected filmography ==
- Primerose (1934)
- Nemo's Bank (1934)
- Compliments of Mister Flow (1936)
- Paris (1937)
- The Chess Player (1938)
- Chéri-Bibi (1938)
- Threats (1940)
- The Crossroads (1942)
- Strange Inheritance (1943)
- Goodbye Leonard (1943)
- The Island of Love (1944)
- The Visitor (1946)
- The Unknown Singer (1947)
- Corridor of Mirrors (1948)
- Woman Hater (1948)
- One Night with You (1948)
- Maya (1949)
- The Widow and the Innocent (1949)
- Black Jack (1950)
- Andalusia (1951)
- The Lottery of Happiness (1953)
- Virgile (1953)
- A Caprice of Darling Caroline (1953)
- It's the Paris Life (1954)
- Blood to the Head (1956)

== Bibliography ==
- Bonnefille, Eric. Julien Duvivier: le mal aimant du cinéma français, Volume 2. Harmattan, 2002.
- Keaney, Michael F. British Film Noir Guide. McFarland, 2015.
