= Sainte-Adèle =

- City
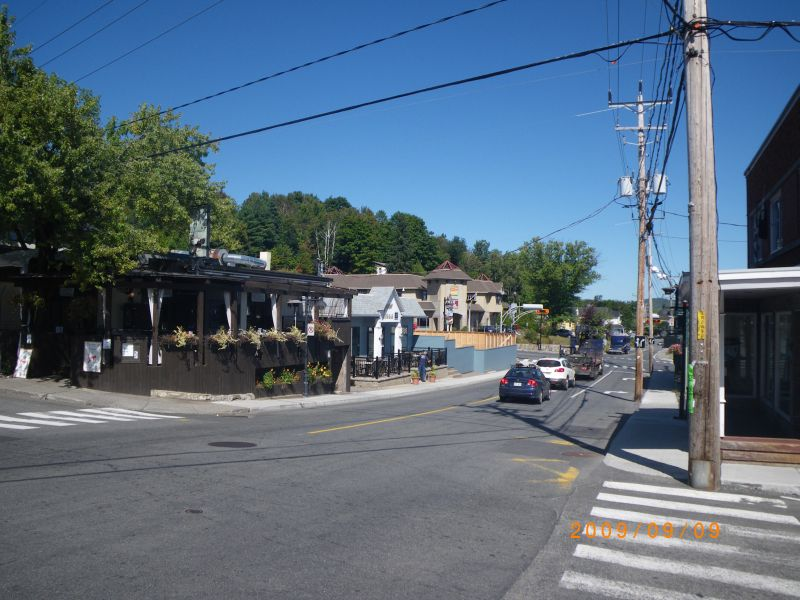
- Downtown Sainte-Adèle

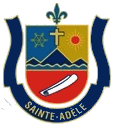
- Coat of arms
- Motto: Au Cœur des Saisons (The Heart of the Seasons)
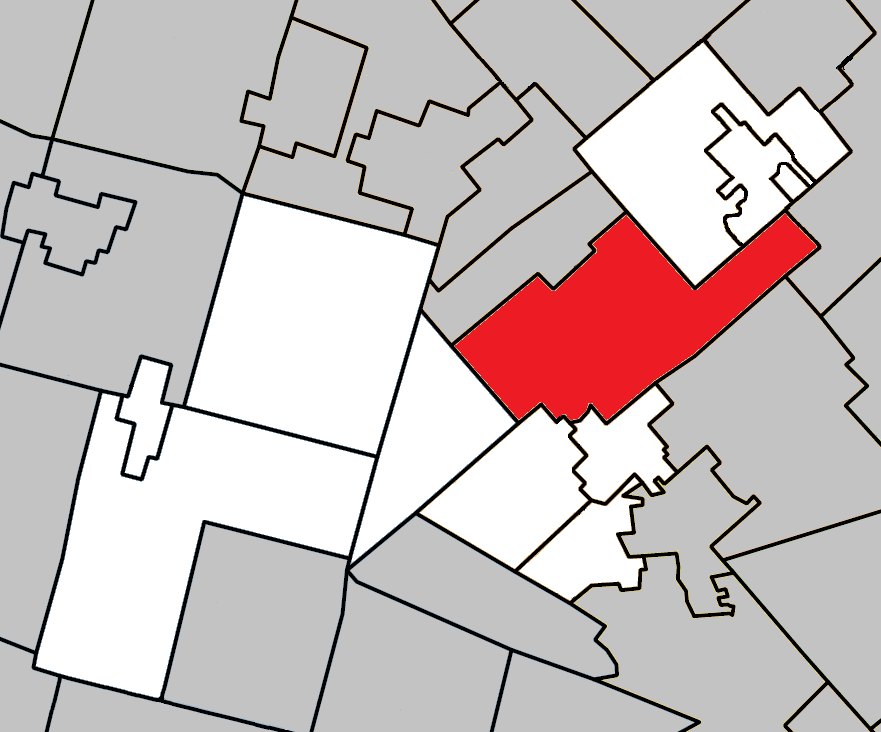
- Location within Les Pays-d'en-Haut RCM

- Location in central Quebec
- Coordinates: 45°57′N 74°08′W
- Country: Canada
- Province: Quebec
- Region: Laurentides
- RCM: Les Pays-d'en-Haut
- Constituted: August 27, 1997

Government
  - Mayor: Nadine Brière
  - Fed. riding: Laurentides—Labelle
  - Prov. riding: Bertrand

Area
  - Total: 124.46 km^{2} (48.05 sq mi)
  - Land: 119.67 km^{2} (46.20 sq mi)
  - Urban: 9.10 km^{2} (3.51 sq mi)

Population (2021)
  - Total: 14,010
  - Density: 117.1/km^{2} (303/sq mi)
  - Urban: 6,019
  - Urban density: 661.7/km^{2} (1,714/sq mi)
  - Pop (2016–21): ▲8.4%
  - Dwellings: 8,002
- Demonym(s): Adélois, oise
- Time zone: UTC−5 (EST)
  - Summer (DST): UTC−4 (EDT)
- Postal code(s): J8B
- Area codes: 450 and 579
- Highways A-15 (TCH): R-117; R-370
- Website: www.ville.sainte-adele.qc.ca

Sainte-Adèle (French pronunciation: [sɛ̃t adɛl]) is a municipality in Quebec, Canada, and it is part of the Les Pays-d'en-Haut Regional County Municipality. It lies on Route 117 about 70 kilometres (43 mi) north-west of Montreal. Its tourism-based economy centres on its skiing and hotel industry. Sainte-Adèle had a population of 14,010 as of 2021.

== History ==
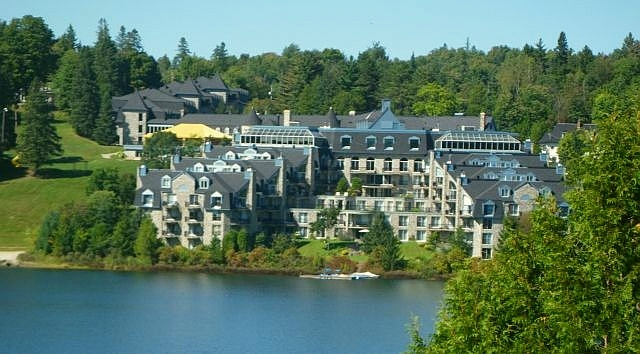
Hotel Chantecler

In 1842 Augustin-Norbert Morin purchased land in the area that would become Sainte-Adèle for 8¢ per arpent, which colonists arriving soon after then purchased from him for $8 CAD per arpent. The town of Sainte-Adèle was founded in 1855. A rail line was constructed and the first Canadian Pacific Railway train arrived in the town in 1891. The railway was used primarily to transport wood, cattle, dairy products, and mail.

The development and growth of the village of Sainte Adele began in 1938 with the opening of Le Chantecler Hotel[8], a 45-room inn on the shores of Lac Rond. It grew into a resort and convention centre. The Chantecler hotel was closed in 2018 and demolished in 2020.

In 1939 this was followed by the development of the Ste. Adele Lodge in the centre of the community. The history on the location of the Ste. Adele Lodge[9] actually dates back to 1910 when the site at the top of the big hill was developed and occupied by l’Hotel Rochon from 1910-1928. In 1928 its name was changed to La Maison Blanche and it operated until 1939. In late 1939 a Montreal businessman, Tom G. Potter, bought the old La Maison Blanche, demolished it and in its place built the Ste. Adele Lodge.

The hotel consisted of the main building with an attached structure called the Red Room, which was a dance hall and got its name from the red cement polished floor. Facing north behind the main hotel was a building called The Cedars with deluxe hotel rooms and on the right, a building called The Pines containing less expensive rooms. The swimming pool with its three diving boards was the largest pool in Quebec outside Montreal. Mr. Potter also developed two ski hills, Hills 40 and 80, where the initial charge for day skiing was $0.50.

Mr. Potter hired the Johnny Holmes[10] Band which played on the CBC, and its star attraction Oscar Peterson [11] to perform during one summer. Mr. Lowell Thomas, the American radio broadcaster, broadcast shows from both the Ste. Adele Lodge and Mount Tremblant to his audiences in the United States, promoting the resorts as destinations for skiers. After Mr. Potter’s death in 1946 the hotel was sold and become known as the Montclair until it was destroyed in 1969. Tom Potter, who owned both the Ste. Adele Lodge and the Alpine Inn, Emile Cochand[12] owner of Chalet Cochand and Joe Ryan[13] a New Yorker who owned Mont Tremblant ski resort, were major players responsible for the development of the ski industry in the Laurentians.

The first "ski resort", Chalet Cochand, was built in 1914, followed by The Alpine Inn in 1924. More hotels and expansions of local ski slopes followed. Sainte-Adèle's local newspaper, Le Journal des Pays d'en Haut, was established in 1967. Supporting the thriving hotel and resort business of the time, the École Hôtelières des Laurentides (Hotel School of the Laurentians) opened in 1983.

In 1991 the railway was decommissioned and converted to a park for cyclists and skiers. The town has since abandoned the tourism industry in favour of residential development. Sony Pictures Entertainment mostly filmed Snowboard Academy here in 1995. Also during this era, more land was being used for condominium complexes, attracting more permanent residents to the area.

In 2009, municipal taxes were doubled to what they were in the early 1990s to reflect the high demand for real estate that has been experienced in the municipality in recent years.

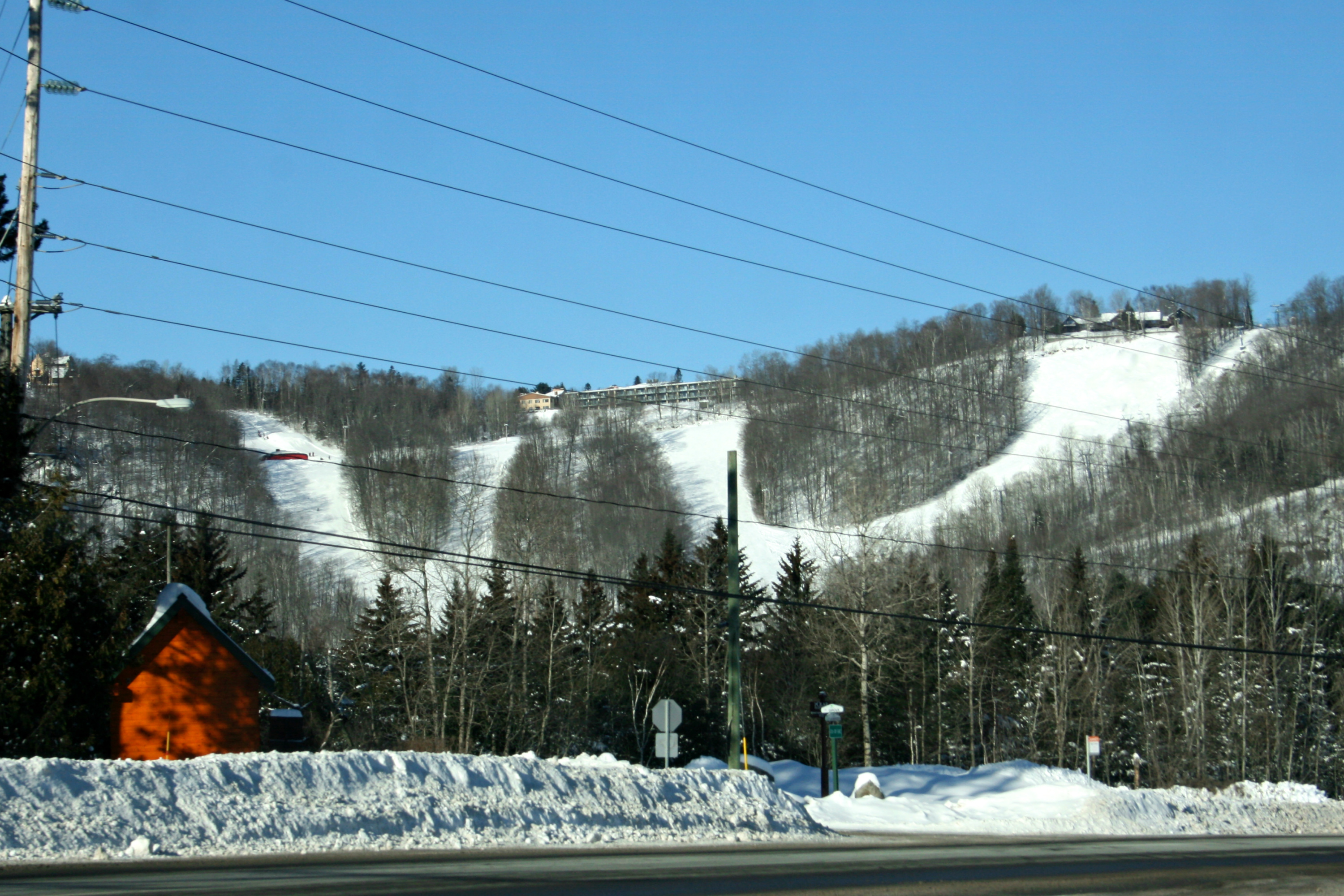
Mont Gabriel ski resort

=== Municipal history ===
The municipal status of Sainte-Adèle and the surrounding areas was the subject of personal, local, provincial, and national politics several times in its history. A coarse timeline of these divisions and fusions follows:

- 1918: Mont-Rolland is separated from Sainte-Adèle and created as a factory town.
- 1922: Val-Morin becomes an independent municipality.
- 1922: Sainte-Adèle was divided into the municipalities of Sainte-Adèle-en-Haut and Sainte-Adèle-en-Bas along class lines.
- 1948: Owners of the Chantecler Hotel petition the Ministère des Affaires municipales for the right to create the Village of Chantecler.
- 1951: Sainte-Marguerite-Station demands the right to secede from Sainte-Adèle.
- 1954: The Mont-Gabriel becomes a municipality with only nine citizens.
- 1964: Sainte-Adèle-en-Haut and Sainte-Adèle-en-Bas are reunited.
- 1967: Village de Séraphin is created.
- 1968: Part of Mont-Rolland (Sommet Bleu) is annexed by Sainte-Adèle.
- 1981: Mont-Gabriel becomes part of Mont-Rolland.
- 1997: Sainte-Adèle and Mont-Rolland are rejoined.

Sainte-Adèle was the setting of the long-running Quebec television series Les Belles Histoires des pays d'en haut, an adaptation of Claude-Henri Grignon's novel Un Homme et son péché.

== Geography ==
The Rivière aux Mulets to the west and the Rivière Doncaster to the east join the Rivière du Nord to the west of the town centre. The Rivière du Nord flows through the municipality from north to south.

== Demographics ==
In the 2021 Census of Population conducted by Statistics Canada, Sainte-Adèle had a population of 14,010 living in 6,896 of its 8,002 total private dwellings, a change of 8.4% from its 2016 population of 12,919. With a land area of 119.67 km^{2} (46.20 sq mi), it had a population density of 117.1/km^{2} (303.2/sq mi) in 2021.

Historical census populations – Sainte-Adèle

Year	Pop.	±%
1871	1,570	—
1881	1,663	+5.9%
1891	1,493	−10.2%
1901	1,546	+3.5%
1911	1,814	+17.3%
1921	1,223	−32.6%
1931	609	−50.2%
1941	852	+39.9%

Year	Pop.	±%
1951	1,203	+41.2%
1956	1,360	+13.1%
1961	1,897	+39.5%
1966	3,690	+94.5%
1971	3,818	+3.5%
1976	4,186	+9.6%
1981	4,675	+11.7%
1986	4,272	−8.6%

Year	Pop.	±%
1991	4,916	+15.1%
1996	5,837	+18.7%
2001	9,215	+57.9%
2006	10,634	+15.4%
2011	12,137	+14.1%
2016	12,919	+6.4%
2021	14,010	+8.4%

Population counts are not adjusted for boundary changes.
Source: Statistics Canada

Mother tongue (2021):

- French as first language: 90.1%
- English as first language: 4.8%
- English and French as first languages: 2.1%
- Other as first language: 2.6%

== Government ==
List of former mayors:

- Jean-Paul Cardinal (...–2007)
- Marlene Houle (interim mayor, 2007–2008)
- Claude Descôteaux (2008–2009)
- Rejean Charbonneau (2009–2016)
- Robert Milot (2016–2017)
- Nadine Brière (2017–2021)
- Michèle Lalonde (2021–present)

== Education ==
The Centre de services scolaire des Laurentides operates Francophone public schools:

- École Saint-Joseph (secteur Sainte-Adèle)
- École Chante-au-vent (secteur Mont-Rolland)
- École secondaire Augustin Norbert Morin

Sir Wilfrid Laurier School Board operates English-language public schools:

- Ste-Adèle Elementary School (secteur Sainte-Adèle)
- Laurentian Regional High School in Lachute

== See also ==
- List of cities in Quebec
- Village de Séraphin
