= Johnny Frenchman =

- Theatrical release poster
- Directed by: Charles Frend
- Written by: T. E. B. Clarke
- Produced by: Michael Balcon
- Starring: Tom Walls; Patricia Roc; Françoise Rosay; Paul Dupuis
- Cinematography: Roy Kellino
- Edited by: Michael Truman
- Music by: Clifton Parker
- Color process: Black and white
- Production company: Ealing Studios
- Distributed by: Eagle-Lion Distributors
- Release dates: 29 October 1945; 19 October 1945 (New York City)
- Running time: 105 minutes
- Country: United Kingdom
- Language: English

Johnny Frenchman is a 1945 British comedy-drama romance war film produced by Ealing Studios and directed by Charles Frend. The film was produced by Michael Balcon from a screenplay by T. E. B. Clarke, with cinematography by Roy Kellino.

== Plot ==
The film is set at the onset and first months of the Second World War, between March 1939 and June 1940, in a small fishing port in Cornwall, whose inhabitants have an historic, but largely benign, rivalry with their counterparts from a port over the Channel in Brittany in northern France, whose fishing boats fish the same grounds - in this case looking for crabs. Legally the French may not fish within a three-mile limit of the British coast, and vice versa, and breaches of this rule are the cause of frequent spats between the two countries. In this instance, hot-headed Cornish harbour-master Nat Pomeroy confronts Lanec Florrie, an equally redoubtable widow in charge of an otherwise male crew, from a Breton port. Beneath all the bluster and posturing however, there is a mutual understanding and respect between the two communities.

Widower Nat's daughter, Sue Pomeroy, has been friends since childhood with local boy Bob Tremayne, and their eventual marriage has been taken as a foregone conclusion. During a visit by the Cornish contingent to Brittany a wrestling match is arranged between Bob and Lanec's son Yan, during which Yan breaks a bone, to the concern of Sue. Yan is attracted to Sue and begins actively to woo her, with great success. Sue is torn between her own attraction to Yan and her unspoken commitment to Bob, a situation which leads to increased friction between the two communities. However, when war-related danger ensues, both sides realise that their unity in common cause against the mutual German enemy, and that it is more important than petty squabbles. Bob is called up to serve in the British navy, and in a showdown conversation with Yan before he leaves, the two agree that Sue must be allowed to follow her own heart.

Yan comes to Cornwall to also serve in war duties.

With most men absent, a loose sea mine drifts into the Cornish harbour and Lanec bravely mans a ship to net it and tow it out, making her a local hero and easing the tensions. She eventually pushes Sue and Yan to marry, which they do without Pomeroy's consent.

== Cast ==
- Tom Walls as Nat Pomeroy
- Patricia Roc as Sue Pomeroy
- Françoise Rosay as Lanec Florrie
- Paul Dupuis as Yan Kervarec
- Ralph Michael as Bob Tremayne
- Arthur Hambling as Steven Matthews
- James Harcourt as Joe Pender
- Grace Arnold as Mrs. Matthews
- Beatrice Varley as Mrs. Tremayne
- Drusilla Wills as Miss Bennett
- Judith Furse as June Matthews
- Frederick Piper as Zacky Penrose
- Richard George as Charlie West
- Bill Blewitt as Dick Trewhiddle
- James Knight as Tom Hocking

== Location filming ==
The film's exterior sequences were shot in the Cornish fishing port of Mevagissey.
