= Good Morning Chuck =

Canadian television series

- French: Bon matin Chuck, ou l'art de réduire les méfaits
- Country of origin: Canada
- Original language: French

Original release
- Network: Crave
- Release: 2023

Good Morning Chuck (or the Art of Harm Reduction) (French: Bon matin Chuck, ou l'art de réduire les méfaits) is a Canadian television comedy-drama series, which premiered in 2023 on Crave. The series stars Nicolas Pinson as Chuck Bélanger, a Quebec television morning host who is forced into a drug rehabilitation program after a public scandal derails his career.

The series is based in part on Pinson's own real-life struggles with drug addiction. It was shot principally in Sherbrooke, Quebec, in 2022.

The cast also includes Chantal Fontaine, Sylvain Marcel, Bernard Fortin, Marilyn Castonguay, Benz Antoine, Amélie Simard, Hugo Dubé, Justin Jackson, Lyna Khellef, Nathalie Doummar, Danielle Ouimet, Claire Jacques, Frédérike Bédard, Myriam De Verger, Kevin Steen, Yves Corbeil and Lamia Benhacine.

The series was screened in competition at the 2023 Canneseries festival, in advance of its broadcast premiere on May 24, 2023. It is available on Crave in both the original French and a dubbed English version.

It is also slated for future terrestrial rebroadcast on Noovo.
