= Pack Up Your Troubles =

Pack Up Your Troubles may refer to:

- Pack Up Your Troubles (1932 film), a 1932 Laurel and Hardy film
- Pack Up Your Troubles (1939 film), a 1939 American comedy film
- Pack Up Your Troubles (1940 film), a 1940 British war comedy film

== See also ==
- "Pack Up Your Troubles in Your Old Kit-Bag", a World War I marching song
- Peck Up Your Troubles, a 1945 animated short film starring Sylvester the Cat
