= Three Silent Men =

- Directed by: Thomas Bentley
- Written by: Jack Byrd; Dudley Leslie
- Based on: the novel Three Silent Men by E.P. Thorne
- Produced by: F.W. Baker
- Starring: Sebastian Shaw; Derrick De Marney; Patricia Roc; Arthur Hambling
- Cinematography: Geoffrey Faithfull
- Edited by: Cecil H. Williamson
- Production company: Butcher's Film Service
- Distributed by: Butcher's Film Service
- Release date: 7 September 1940
- Running time: 72 minutes
- Country: United Kingdom
- Language: English

Three Silent Men is a 1940 British second feature ('B') crime film directed by Thomas Bentley and starring Sebastian Shaw, Derrick De Marney, Patricia Roc and Arthur Hambling. It was written by Jack Byrd and Dudley Leslie. The screenplay concerns a pacifist surgeon who must operate to save the life of the inventor of a deadly weapon of war. When the inventor dies the surgeon becomes the prime suspect.

== Plot ==
Pacifist surgeon Sir James Quentin operates on Zaroff, the inventor of a lethal weapon to be used against the Allies in the war. When Zaroff is discovered dead from an excess of ether, Quentin is immediately suspected. To clear her father's name, Quentin's daughter Pat and her boyfriend Captain Mellish search for the murderer.

== Cast ==
- Sebastian Shaw as Sir James Quentin
- Derrick De Marney as Captain John Mellish
- Patricia Roc as Pat Quentin
- Arthur Hambling as Ginger Brown
- Meinhart Maur as Karl Zaroff
- John Turnbull as Inspector Gill
- Peter Gawthorne as General Bullington
- André Morell as Klein
- Charles Oliver as Johnson
- Jack Vyvyan as Sergeant Wells
- Billy Watts as Fernald
- Charles Paton as Mr. Gibbs
- Basil Cunard as Dr. Fairlie
- Hugh Dempster as Nelson
- Ian Fleming as Pennington
- Cameron Hall as Badger Wood
- Scott Harrold as Ted Blacklock
- F.B.J. Sharp as Coroner
- Bill Shine as bystander at accident
- Cynthia Stock as Matron

== Reception ==
The Monthly Film Bulletin wrote: "After a slow and uncertain opening the story gets well away. It has abundance of action, thrills, suspense, a pleasant romance and works up to an unexpected and dramatic climax. The weakest point is rather laboured dialogue, but this is comparatively unimportant when the action develops. The direction is workmanlike and the atmosphere convincing. The acting is uneven. Derrick de Marney makes a likable and natural John Mellish, and Patricia Roc is unaffected and attractive as Pat. Sebastian Shaw is miscast as Sir James, and never seems quite at ease. The supporting players are competent and good."

Kine Weekly wrote: "The story is not quickly off the mark, but its acceleration improves as it warms up, and it ends with pace, punch and an exciting and showmanlike element of surprise. The players are, with few exceptions, equal to their responsibilities, the direction reveals resource, and the atmosphere is, for the most part, both colourful and convincing. In all, a lively and popular best seller in handy form."

Picturegoer wrote: "Espionage melodrama, rather slow in getting off the mark, but with a thrilling ending. ... Sebastian Shaw is a trifle theatrical as Sir James, but Derrick de Marney is good as Mellish and Patricia Roc reveals charm and acting ability as the heroine."

TV Guide gave the film two out of five stars, calling it "Badly written, though the suspense makes it entertaining."
