= One Night with You (1948 film) =

- Original British quad poster by Eric Pulford
- Directed by: Terence Young
- Screenplay by: Caryl Brahms; S. J. Simon
- Based on: Music on the Run by Carlo Ludovico Bragaglia
- Produced by: Josef Somlo
- Starring: Nino Martini; Patricia Roc; Bonar Colleano; Hugh Wakefield; Guy Middleton; Stanley Holloway
- Cinematography: André Thomas
- Edited by: Douglas Myers
- Music by: Lambert Williamson
- Production company: Two Cities Films
- Distributed by: General Film Distributors
- Release date: 25 April 1948
- Running time: 92 minutes
- Country: United Kingdom
- Language: English
- Budget: £236,200
- Box office: £63,200

One Night with You is a 1948 British musical comedy film directed by Terence Young and starring Nino Martini, Patricia Roc and Bonar Colleano. It was written by Caryl Brahms and S.J. Simon adapted from the Italian film Music on the Run by Carlo Ludovoco Bragaglia.

== Plot ==
Giulio, a famous opera singer engaged for the lead in an Italian movie loses his identity papers and is stranded at a railway station with Mary Santell, a young British woman.

== Cast ==
- Nino Martini as Giulio Moris
- Patricia Roc as Mary Santell
- Bonar Colleano as Piero Santellini
- Hugh Wakefield as Santell
- Guy Middleton as Matty
- Charles Goldner as Fogliati
- Stanley Holloway as Tramp
- Willy Fueter as Pirelli
- Miles Malleson as Jailer
- Martin Miller as Police Inspector
- Richard Hearne as Station Master
- Irene Worth as Lina Linari
- Judith Furse as Second Writer
- Stuart Latham as First Writer
- Brian Worth as Third Writer
- Christopher Lee as Pirelli's Assistant
- Andreas Malandrinos as Waiter
- Percy Walsh as Hotel Proprietor
- John Warren as First Ticket Collector
- Cyril Smith as Second Ticket Collector
- Armand Guinle as Restaurant Manager
- Ferdy Mayne as First Detective
- Tristram Butt as Second Detective

== Reception ==
=== Critical ===
The Monthly Film Bulletin wrote: "There is plenty of opportunity here for real rollicking fun, but, except for brief moments, the opportunity is missed. The film begins well with mime from Stanley Holloway, but from then on the plot is weighted down with heavy-handed comedy which doesn't quite come off. Patricia Roc, as Mary, gives a disinterested, completely characterless performance; and although Nino Martini has a fine tenor voice his singing is frequently interrupted and his acting is parrot-like and unimaginative. Hugh Wakefield and Guy Middleton are good as Englishmen abroad, and Charles Goldner and Bonar Colleano are great fun as excitable Italians. The music throughout is pleasant, but the comedy is stodgy and dismally slow. André Thomas's photography is excellent."

Kine Weekly wrote: "he start is snappy, but the romantic plot, although approached from a comedy angle and generously festooned with tuneful songs, occasionally shows signs of wear. The finale recaptures some of the film's initial wit, but bright as the book-ends are they fail to atone for its comparatively unexciting midriff. With all its laughter and: melody, One Night With You hardly goes like a flash."

The New York Times called it "a limp, tedious and transparent farce hardly worth all the strenuous histrionics and singing... One Night With You, in short, is a long, dull time."

The Radio Times called it "An occasionally diverting British-made comedy, enlivened by a supporting cast that includes Bonar Colleano, Stanley Holloway and the soon-to-be great stage actress Irene Worth."

=== Box office ===
The film earned producer's receipts of £53,700 in the UK and £9,500 overseas. According to Rank's own records the film had made a loss of £173,000 for the company by December 1949.
