= Black Jack (1950 film) =

1950 French-Spanish-American film directed by Julien Duvivier

- Directed by: Julien Duvivier
- Written by: Julien Duvivier; Robert Gaillard; Michael Pertwee; Roland Pertwee; Charles Spaak
- Produced by: André De Neueville; Julien Duvivier; Almos Mezo; Michael Salkind
- Starring: George Sanders; Herbert Marshall; Patricia Roc; Howard Vernon
- Cinematography: André Thomas
- Edited by: Margarita de Ochoa
- Music by: Joseph Kosma
- Production companies: Alsa Films; Jungla Films
- Distributed by: Les Films Marceau (France)
- Release date: 20 November 1950
- Running time: 90 minutes
- Countries: France; Spain
- Language: English

Black Jack, also known as Captain Black Jack, is a 1950 adventure film written and directed by Julien Duvivier and starring George Sanders, Herbert Marshall, Patricia Roc and Dennis Wyndham. The English-language film was a coproduction between France, Spain and the United States.

== Plot ==
Demobilised after World War II, Mike Alexander pursues any deals, legal or not, that will return a fortune. He has acquired a yacht in Mallorca, where he hears of a cargo ship full of refugees in difficulty, the Chalcis. He agrees to take the six richest people from the ship but is sickened by the distress of the rest and tells the captain to drop them ashore on an isolated island. He sees an attractive young woman name Ingrid who refuses his offer of a free trip to safety. The captain scuttles the ship in a hidden cove and takes Ingrid to Tangier.

Shortly after, Ingrid appears in Mallorca as companion to eccentric American millionairess Emily Birk. She again refuses Alexander's advances, even when he mentions that his fortune is arriving soon. Mrs. Birk discloses to Ingrid that she is a cop pursuing Alexander, who is an evil crook expecting a cargo of drugs. Ingrid agrees to accompany Alexander to the island where the Chalcis is lying, and they are dismayed to find all of the refugees dead, locked in the hold by the captain. When Alexander's drugs arrive, concealed in a schooner, Mrs. Birk, who is actually not a cop but a dealer, takes them and hides them in the wreck of the Chalcis. Alexander's cover is blown, so he destroys the consignment. To escape the law, he steers his yacht toward Tangier and Ingrid agrees to flee with him. Police launches pursue them and shoot Alexander dead.

== Cast ==
- George Sanders as Mike Alexander
- Herbert Marshall as Doctor James Curtis
- Patricia Roc as Ingrid Dekker
- Agnes Moorehead as Emily Birk
- Marcel Dalio as Captain Nicarescu
- Dennis Wyndham as Fernando Barrio
- Howard Vernon as Schooner Captain
- José Nieto as Inspector Carnero
- Jolie Gabor as jeweler

== Reception ==
The film was not released in the United States until July 1952, where it was titled Captain Black Jack.

In a contemporary review for The New York Times, critic Howard Thompson called the film an "absurd and trashy little melodrama" and wrote: "'Captain Black Jack' ... at least offers a full quota of surprises. The first is the embarrassing spectacle of such seasoned performers as George Sanders, Agnes Moorehead, Herbert Marshall and England's decorative Patricia Roc capering through various hotels, gambling casinos and waterfronts along the Mediterranean in a feebly florid story that just misses lampooning itself. ... It is even more embarrassing to learn that one of the great names in French films, Julien Duvivier, not only directed the entire mess but, with Charles Spaak, scribbled it."
