= Bernard Knowles =

British film director (1900–1975)

Bernard Knowles (20 February 1900 – 12 February 1975) was an English film director, producer, cinematographer and screenwriter. Born in Manchester, Knowles worked with Alfred Hitchcock on numerous occasions before the director emigrated to Hollywood.

Knowles later graduated as a director and screenwriter, directing a number of high-profile films, including the 1946 Gainsborough Melodrama The Magic Bow. He worked a great deal on television shows, including Fabian of the Yard, Dial 999, Ivanhoe and The Adventures of Robin Hood.

== Career ==
=== Cinematographer ===
Knowle's credits include Mumsie (1927) and Dawn (1928) for Herbert Wilcox, Love's Option (1928), The Broken Melody (1929), The Silver King (1929), Auld Lang Syne (1929), Rookery Nook (1930), The Nipper (1930), French Leave (1930), School for Scandal (1930), Canaries Sometimes Sing (1930), The Calendar (1931), The Hound of the Baskervilles (1931), and White Face (1932, The Good Companions (1933), Falling for You (1933). He workes on the lighting for Jew Süss (1934). He shot Jack Ahoy (1934) and The Camels Are Coming (1934).

=== Alfred Hitchcock ===
Knowles combined with Alfred Hitchcock on The 39 Steps (1935). He shot Forever England (1935), King of the Damned (1935) and Rhodes of Africa (1936).

Knowles and Hitchcock were reunited on Secret Agent (1936) and Sabotage (1936). In between Knowles filmed East Meets West (1936).

Knowles then shot Take My Tip, (1937), then was back for Hitchcock on Young and Innocent (1937). He did some uncredited camera work on King Solomon's Mines (1937).

Knowles then filmed The Mikado (1939), and was back with Hitchcock for Jamaica Inn (1939), the last movie the director made before moving to the US.

Others were French Without Tears (1940) for Anthony Asquith; Spy for a Day (1940); Gaslight (1940), for Thorold Dickinson; Freedom Radio (1941) and Quiet Wedding (1941) for Asquith; The Saint's Vacation (1941); Jeannie (1941), The Day Will Dawn (1942), Unpublished Story (1942), Secret Mission (1942) and Talk About Jacqueline (1942) for Harold French; The Demi-Paradise (1943) for Asquith; and English Without Tears (1944) for French.

=== Director ===
Knowles went to Gainsborough Pictures to shoot Love Story (1944). It was a huge hit and the studio gave him the chance to direct with A Place of One's Own (1945) starring their two biggest stars, James Mason and Margaret Lockwood. It was not a financial success.

However Knowles' next film as director, The Magic Bow (1946), a biopic of Niccolò Paganini starring Stewart Granger, was better received. So too was the drama The Man Within (1947) with Michael Redgrave.

Knowles had a big hit with Jassy (1947) starring Lockwood.

He left Gainsborough to direct The White Unicorn (1947) for producer John Corfeld. He then directed two popular comedies, Easy Money (1948), and The Perfect Woman (1949), co-writing the latter. Knowles directed The Lost People (1949) with Muriel Box.

Knowles did The Reluctant Widow (1950) with Jean Kent, an attempt to reprise the success of the Gainsborough melodramas.

=== Television ===
Later films as director included some B Pictures, Park Plaza 605 (1953) and Barbados Quest (1955) with Tom Conway.

He began to work in television, directing episodes of Douglas Fairbanks, Jr. Presents (1953), Fabian of the Yard (1953), Colonel March of Scotland Yard (1956), The New Adventures of Martin Kane (1957), Sword of Freedom (1957), The Adventures of Sir Lancelot (1956–57), The Buccaneers (1956–57), Ivanhoe (1958–59), Target (1958), Dial 999 (1958), and The Adventures of Robin Hood (1960).

=== Later career ===
Knowles' later directing credits include Frozen Alive (1964), and Spaceflight IC-1: An Adventure in Space (1965). He co-directed Hell Is Empty (1967) and was the director on Magical Mystery Tour (1967), starring The Beatles.

He died shortly before his 75th birthday in Taplow, Buckinghamshire in 1975.

== Selected filmography ==
=== As cinematographer ===
With Alfred Hitchcock

- The 39 Steps (1935)
- Sabotage (1936)
- Secret Agent (1936)
- Young and Innocent (1937)
- Jamaica Inn (1939)

=== Others ===
- Dawn (1928)
- Love's Option (1928)
- The Broken Melody (1929)
- The Silver King (1929)
- Auld Lang Syne (1929)
- Canaries Sometimes Sing (1930)
- French Leave (1930)
- The Calendar (1931)
- The Good Companions (1933)
- East Meets West (1936)
- Take My Tip (1937)
- Gaslight (1940)
- The Saint's Vacation (1941)
- Quiet Wedding (1941)
- Freedom Radio (1941)
- Jeannie (1941)
- Unpublished Story (1942)
- Talk About Jacqueline (1942)
- The Demi-Paradise (1942)
- Love Story (1944)

=== As director ===
- A Place of One's Own (1945)
- The Magic Bow (1946)
- The White Unicorn (1947)
- Easy Money (1948)
- The Perfect Woman (1949)
- The Reluctant Widow (1950)
- Park Plaza 605 (1953)
- Barbados Quest (1955)
- Spaceflight IC-1: An Adventure in Space (1965)
- Hell is Empty (1967) – co-director
- Magical Mystery Tour (TV) (1967)
