= Les Belles Histoires des pays d'en haut =

Canadian television drama series

- Genre: historical drama, soap opera
- Created by: Claude-Henri Grignon
- Written by: Claude-Henri Grignon
- Starring: Jean-Pierre Masson; Andrée Champagne; Yvon Leroux; Gabriel Gascon; Geneviève Bujold; Jean LeClerc; Yves Corbeil; Paul Dupuis; Juliette Béliveau; Élise Lavoie
- Country of origin: Canada
- No. of episodes: 495

Original release
- Network: Radio-Canada
- Release: October 8, 1956 – June 1, 1970

Les Belles Histoires des pays d'en haut (The Beautiful Stories of the Upper Countries) is a French-language Canadian television drama series, which aired on Radio-Canada from October 8, 1956, to June 1, 1970. One of the longest-running programs in the history of Canadian television, the series produced 495 episodes during its 14-year run and was one of the first influential téléromans.

Written by Claude-Henri Grignon as an adaptation of his 1933 novel Un Homme et son péché and initially set in the 1880s, the series starred Jean-Pierre Masson as Séraphin Poudrier, the wealthy but miserly mayor of the village of Sainte-Adèle, Quebec, and Andrée Champagne as Donalda Laloge-Poudrier, the young daughter of a village resident who is given in marriage to Séraphin as payment for a family debt even though she remains in love with her suitor Alexis Labranche (Gabriel Gascon). With a vast ensemble cast of extended family and other villagers, the series also delved much more deeply than the novel into the dramatic interactions of the larger community, depicting the early settlement of Quebec's Laurentides region and evolving from the novel's satirical portrait of Séraphin's moral values into a complex soap opera. Among others, the show's ensemble cast included Yvon Leroux, Geneviève Bujold, Jean LeClerc, Yves Corbeil, Paul Dupuis, Andrée Basilières, Guy L'Écuyer and Juliette Béliveau and Élise Lavoie.

Several real historical figures, including Antoine Labelle, Honoré Mercier and Arthur Buies (fr), are depicted in the series.

The series ended production of new episodes in 1970, although it continued to air in daytime repeats on both Radio-Canada and Télé-Québec for many years. Many episodes are currently available on Radio-Canada's video on demand website TOU.TV.

In 2016, Radio-Canada launched a new modernist remake of the series, Les Pays d'en haut.

== See also ==
- Village de Séraphin
