= The Reluctant Widow =

1946 novel by Georgette Heyer

- First edition cover
- Author: Georgette Heyer
- Language: English
- Genre: Regency, Romance
- Publisher: Heinemann
- Publication date: 1946
- Publication place: United Kingdom
- Media type: Print
- Pages: 306 pp

The Reluctant Widow is a 1946 Regency romance by Georgette Heyer, published by Heinemann in the UK, and by Putnam the following year in the US. A humorous parody of a Gothic novel, it is set in early 1813. It was published with the description "By midnight she is a bride, by dawn a widow", and with gouache artwork by Philip Gough.

== Plot summary ==
The daughter of a ruined gentleman, 26-year old Elinor Rochdale has been working as a governess to sustain herself. Notice of an opening takes her to the village of Billingshurst, where she is met by a coachman asking if she has come from London "in answer to the advertisement". Arriving at a distant hall, she is interviewed by Edward, Lord Carlyon, who is in dispute with his dissipated cousin, Eustace Cheviot, living nearby. Eustace has accused Edward of trying to acquire his property of Highnoons and Edward has advertised for a young woman to come and marry his cousin and thus inherit the property in the event of anything happening to Eustace. Elinor's arrival in search of the position of governess is thus at cross purposes.

Unfortunately Eustace has already mortally injured himself in a scuffle with Edward's adolescent youngest brother Nicky, currently rusticated from his college. Elinor now finds herself coerced into becoming the wife of the dying Eustace, and so mistress of his ruined estate and, very likely, in danger of being dunned for his accumulated debts and gambling losses. The dying Eustace agrees to the hurried wedding and to signing a will that leaves everything to Elinor in order to spite his cousin Edward. By morning Eustace is dead and Elinor find herself addressed as Mrs Cheviot by her new family, who promise to look after her interests and, as a first instalment, to supply her with widow's weeds as a sign of mourning that she scarcely feels.

Elinor's new household is presided over by the rustic Mr and Mrs Barrows and is soon intruded upon by unwelcome visitors. First a gentlemanly French émigré, claiming to be a close friend of Eustace, is found wandering about the locked house at night. Having discovered the secret door by which he entered, Nicky lies in wait for him the following night, but gives the game away by blundering into a suit of armour and is shot in the shoulder by the intruder. Soon afterwards, Edward brings Elinor's former nurse, Miss Beccles (whom she calls 'Becky'), to wait on her. From the description given of the mysterious visitor, Edward guesses that he was Louis de Castres, and the possibility is raised that he was looking for something in the Highnoons bookroom, possibly of a treasonable nature in view of the Peninsular War now being waged against the French by Wellington.

Next Eustace's uncle, Lord Bedlington, arrives, claiming to have heard the distressing news of his nephew's death in London, although the family has not yet sent an announcement of it to the papers. Soon after, Edward's other brother visits the Hall; this is the diplomat John Carlyon, who has had his suspicions of De Castres and Lord Bedlington for some time. But Lord Bedlington does not return for Eustace's funeral as he had promised. Instead, his place is taken by his son, Francis Cheviot, an exquisite dandy and crony of Beau Brummel, very much concerned for the state of his health in the winter cold, who takes up quarters at Highnoons. He reveals that the body of his close friend De Castres has been discovered stabbed in London, which arouses the suspicions of the Carlyons, since the report in the papers made no mention of the cause of his death.

Following the funeral, Elinor is knocked unconscious in the bookroom. Edward hurries to assure himself of her welfare and the two engage in spirited raillery about her future safety. Francis, in the meanwhile, has left to drive himself to London but returns to the Hall later in the evening and has a private conference with Edward. The papers that the conspirators wanted were Wellington's plans for his 1813 invasion of Spain. Edward had already guessed their hiding place and retrieved them. Francis wishes to restore the memorandum to the authorities in London without scandal coming to the family and Edward hands it over. Elinor has earlier driven herself over to the Hall and, relieved at the outcome of her adventures, now proposes to drive back. Taking her place, Edward proposes yet another marriage to Elinor, this time to himself, and - as before - browbeats her into agreeing.

== Across genres ==
Georgette Heyer is credited with the establishment of the modern Regency romance as a separate genre. However, genre writing is of long descent and it is therefore unsurprising that traces of earlier subjects can be found in Heyer's historical novels, often introduced to give period veracity but also to add variety. One such theme in The Reluctant Widow grows out of Elinor Rochdale's profession of governess. The governess novel was a popular Victorian genre, allowing dramatic contrast between the dependent lot of the economically disadvantaged female and the easy circumstances of her employers. At the start of Elinor's adventure, Lord Carlyon urges his unreasonable plan on her as a means of escaping the "life of drudgery" which is all she has before her otherwise. She is therefore invited to enter the roll of other literary heroines, well known to Heyer's readers, who managed to rise above their disadvantages. Such a list would include - beside such forgotten pioneering titles of the 1830s as Mary Martha Sherwood's Caroline Mordaunt; or, The Governess (1835), Julia Buckley's Emily, the Governess (1836), Miss Ross's The Governess; or, Politics in Private Life (1836), and Marguerite Blessington's The Governess (1839) - as well as better-known characters like Jane Fairfax in Jane Austen's Emma (1815), Charlotte Brontë's Jane Eyre (1847) and William Makepeace Thackeray's Becky Sharp (1848).

As it turns out, the economic trials of the former governess are as nothing to the hair-raising challenges that Elinor is called on to face in the dilapidated mansion that she inherits. The headless spectre she anticipates encountering there is a feature of the earlier genre of Gothic fiction that Jane Austen had already set the example of parodying in Northanger Abbey (dating from 1803) and Thomas Love Peacock in Nightmare Abbey (1818). Heyer provides us with a clue of what is to come by making Elinor's reading just such a genre novel, Charlotte Smith's The Old Manor House. In Heyer's own time there had been a revival of the Gothic tradition in Daphne du Maurier's novel Rebecca (1938) and its adaptations to stage and screen, which similarly had as theme a fatal marriage inheritance and the solution of a murder at its end. Heyer's scattering of deceptive clues in her handling of the death of Louis de Castres is in the manner of the crime fiction which was the other genre she practised. In this way her cross-fertilisation of genres adds to their variety by giving them fresh contexts.

But, as Mari Ness points out in her consideration of Heyer's parody, its Gothic tropes scarcely divert attention from the plot's sheer improbability. The author's additional strategy is, then, to shift focus to problems familiar to contemporary readers in wartime Britain. Pre-war support of Nazism by the well-born is reflected in the behaviour of the aristocratic Louis de Castres and the complicity of Lord Bedlington, a member of the Regency set about the future monarch, in the time of the Napoleonic Wars. Hers, too, was a time of austerity in which her readers would recognise such necessities as Elinor and Miss Beccles having to darn the table linen and rescue useful items of furniture from the attic. For all its escapist stage-properties, therefore, the novel's appeal to the preoccupations of 1945, the year of its writing, diverts attention from the departure from reality in the story's framework.

== Film adaptation ==
The novel was adapted into a comedy directed by Bernard Knowles and released in April 1950 .

== Bibliography ==
Jennifer Kloester, Georgette Heyer, William Heinemann, 2011
