= Dateline =

Piece of news text

A dateline is a brief piece of text included in news articles that describes where and when the story was written or filed, though the date is often omitted. In the case of articles reprinted from wire services, the distributing organization is also included (though the originating one is not). Datelines are traditionally placed on the first line of the text of the article, before the first sentence.

== Format ==
The location appears first, usually starting with the city in which the reporter has written or dispatched the report. City names are usually printed in uppercase, though this can vary from one publication to another. The political division and/or nation the city is in may follow, but they may be dropped if the city name is widely recognizable due to its size or political importance (a national capital, for instance). The date of the report comes after, followed by an em dash surrounded by spaces, and then the article.

A typical newspaper dateline might read:

BEIRUT, Lebanon, June 2 — The outlook was uncertain today as ...

The same story, if pulled from the United Press International wire, might appear with the UPI identifier as:

BEIRUT, Lebanon, June 2 (UPI) — The outlook was uncertain today as ...

Datelines can take on some unusual forms. When reporters collaborate on a story, two different locations might be listed. UPI and the Associated Press omit a dateline "when a story has been assembled from sources in widely separate areas." In other cases, the exact location may be unknown or intentionally imprecise, such as when profiling a riverboat plying its route, when covering military operations while on a ship at sea or following an invasion force, or when covering a press conference aboard an airplane. A Wall Street Journal article about the kilometer posts along Interstate 19 obliquely reckons the location of Tubac, Arizona, in kilometers from Nogales, Arizona.

== International variations ==
Datelines are used globally with some variations depending on the country's journalistic standards and practices.

In the United Kingdom, datelines often include the city and sometimes the county for less well-known locations. A typical dateline in a British newspaper might read:

LONDON, 5 June —

In Australia, datelines generally include the city and the abbreviation for the state or territory. An example dateline from an Australian news article might read:

SYDNEY, NSW, 5 June —

In Japan, datelines often include the city and sometimes the prefecture. A Japanese newspaper dateline might look like:

TOKYO, 5 June —

In many European countries, such as France and Germany, datelines typically include the city name, often in uppercase, and the date. For example:

PARIS, 5 June —
BERLIN, 5 June —

== Other media ==
The concept of a dateline has been adapted to television. Reporters on news programs might have their location mentioned in an introduction from the news anchor:

"Here now from Albuquerque, New Mexico, is reporter Nigel Culpepper"

A field reporter might also end his stories by combining the location from where he filed the report with a "lockout" (the last thing a reporter says in the report, and includes his name and station ID, in addition to a news branding such as Eyewitness News); especially if the segment is recorded and not live. For example, the last bit of a report could sound like:

"... prompting an investigation into the matter. Richard Morris, BBC News, London."

A number of current affairs TV shows have dateline as part of their name.

== See also ==
- Byline
