= Dateline (TV series) =

- Also known as: Je me souviens
- Genre: historical drama
- Written by: Jean Desprez; Joseph Schull
- Country of origin: Canada
- Original language: English
- No. of seasons: 1

Production
- Executive producer: Guy Parent
- Running time: 30 minutes

Original release
- Network: CBC Television; Radio-Canada
- Release: 7 October 1955 – 30 March 1956

Dateline (French Je me souviens) is a Canadian historical drama television series that aired on CBC Television and Radio-Canada television from 1955 to 1956.

== Premise ==
This series provides dramatic performances based on Canadian history. It was produced in English and French versions with the same performers. Canadian military and public archives provided research material to support the historical background of the dramas. Dateline references events such as the Battle of Fort Oswego (1756), construction of the Rideau Canal (1826–1832), Red River Rebellion (1870), Canadian participation in the Nile Expedition (1884) and the North-West Rebellion (1885).

"Ferguson's Crime", the debut episode, is set after Battle of the Plains of Abraham. It concerns a British soldier who receives a death sentence after a romantic entanglement with an Ursuline nun who treats his injuries.

== Scheduling ==
This half-hour series was broadcast on CBC's English network on alternate Fridays at 8:00 p.m. (Eastern) from 7 October 1955 to 30 March 1956. Wayne and Shuster was broadcast on other weeks.

Corresponding French episodes, titled Je me souviens, aired on Radio-Canada during the week after the corresponding English episodes.
