= Nino Martini =

Italian opera singer (1902–1976)

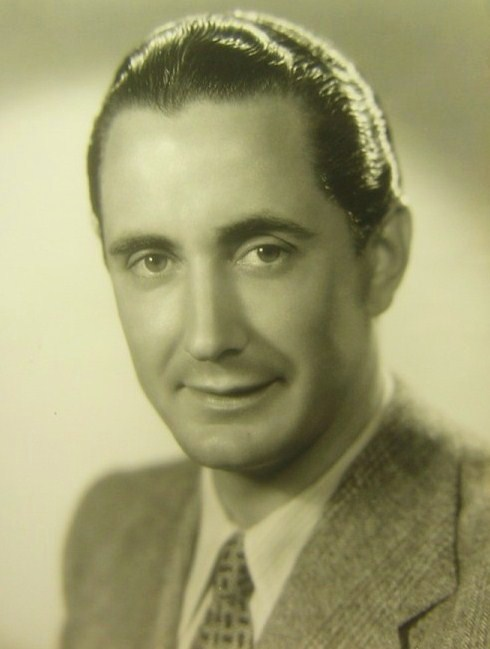
- Nino Martini (1936)

Background information
- Born: 7 August 1905; Verona, Italy
- Died: 10 December 1976 (aged 74) Verona, Italy
- Occupation: Opera singer (lyric tenor)
- Years active: 1925–1952
- Labels: Columbia Records; RCA Victor; Paramount Pictures; United Artists

External audio
- Martini performing "O Solo Mio" with Howard Barlow in 1946

Nino Martini (7 August 1905 – 10 December 1976) was an Italian operatic tenor. He began his career as an opera singer in Italy before moving to the United States to pursue an acting career in films. He appeared in several Hollywood movies during the 1930s and 1940s while simultaneously working as a leading tenor at the Metropolitan Opera in New York City.

== Life and career ==
Martini studied singing under Giovanni Zenatello and Maria Gay, who were married and both well-known opera singers. In 1925, he made his professional opera debut in Milan as the Duke of Mantua in Verdi's Rigoletto. Shortly thereafter, he toured Europe as a concert artist, appearing in many of the continent's major music centres. While in Paris, he was discovered by the film producer Jesse L. Lasky, who engaged him for several Italian-language speaking roles in short films.

In 1929, under the influence of Lasky, Martini immigrated to the United States to pursue a film career. His first appearance was in the Paramount Pictures all-star revue film Paramount on Parade (1930), in which he sang the song "Come Back to Sorrento" in one of the film's Technicolor sequences. This film has been restored by the UCLA Film and Television Archive.

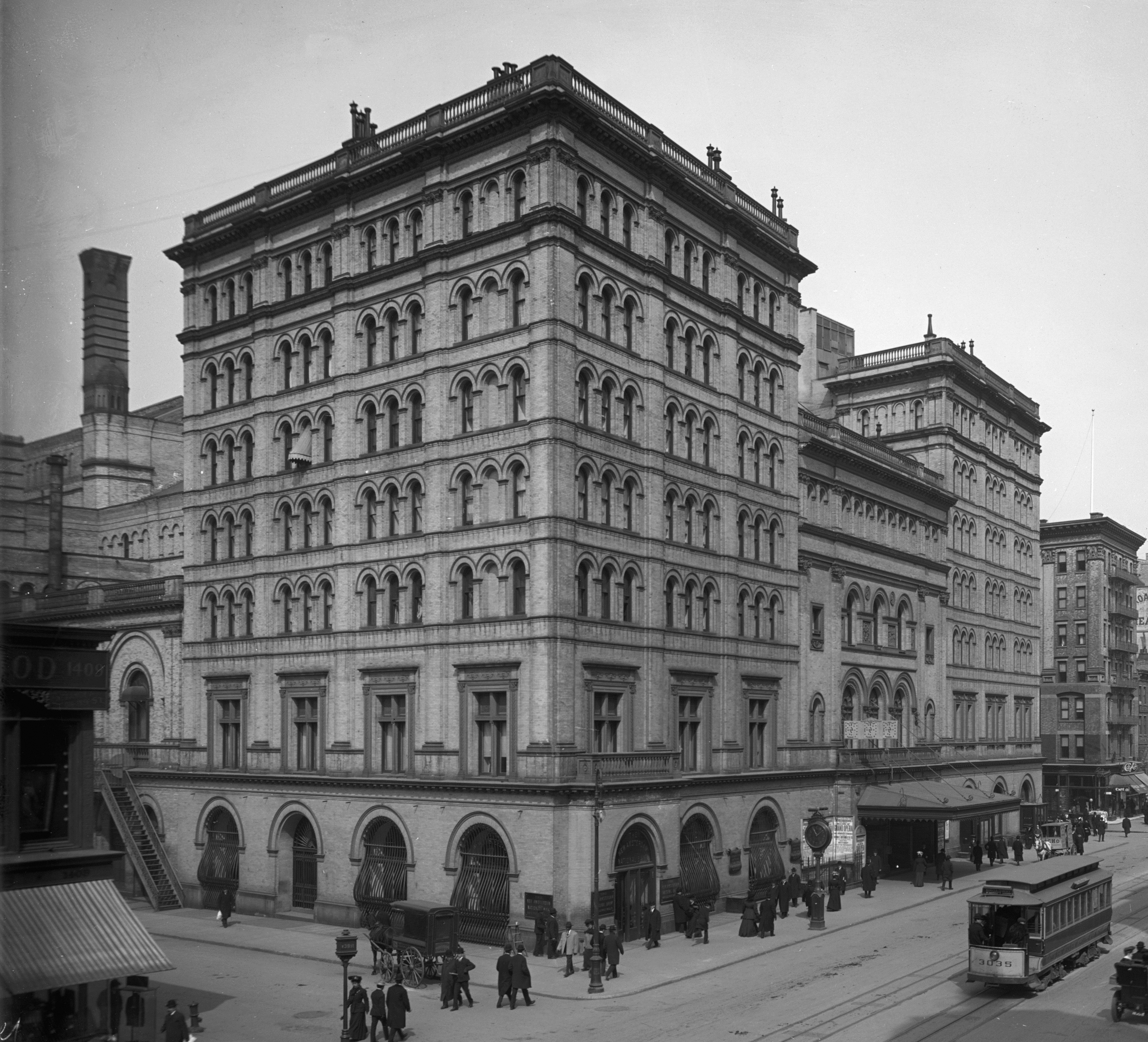
Metropolitan Opera House (39th Street), 1905

Further forays into film were postponed, however, as Martini decided to continue to pursue an opera career. He made his U.S. opera debut in 1931 in Philadelphia. This was followed by several broadcasts of opera for radio. In 1933, Martini joined the roster at the Metropolitan Opera, making his debut on 28 December as the Duke of Mantua. He appeared in several more productions at the Met over the next thirteen years, singing the roles of Alfredo in La traviata, Carlo in Linda di Chamounix, Edgardo in Lucia di Lammermoor, Ernesto in Don Pasquale, Rinuccio in Gianni Schicchi, Rodolfo in La bohème, and Ruggero in La rondine. His last performance at the Met was as Count Almaviva in Il Barbiere di Siviglia on 20 April 1946.

While performing at the Met, Martini occasionally returned to Hollywood to appear in films, mostly appearing in pictures produced by Lasky. His film credits include Here's to Romance (1935), Music for Madame (1937), and The Gay Desperado (1936). The latter film featured Ida Lupino as his co-star, was directed by Rouben Mamoulian, produced by Jesse Lasky and Mary Pickford, and released by United Artists. His last film appearance was in One Night With You in 1948.

In 1945 Martini portrayed Rodolfo to Grace Moore's Mimì for the inaugural performance of the San Antonio Grand Opera Festival. In the late 1940s and 1950s Martini continued to perform as a singer mostly on the radio. He eventually returned to Italy, where he lived in Verona until his death in 1976.

Martini possessed a warm lyric tenor voice that had a wide range and a considerable amount of coloratura facility. He sang mostly within the Italian repertoire that encompassed the bel canto literature of Rossini, Donizetti, and Bellini, the grand operas of Giuseppe Verdi, and the verismo operas of Giacomo Puccini.

== Recordings ==
External audio
- Nino Martini performing "La Dolorosa" in 1934

Martini made a few recordings of opera arias for Columbia Records, which also produced the soundtracks to several of the films that he appeared in. He also recorded some music with RCA Victor and recorded the entire role of Ernesto in Don Pasquale with the Metropolitan Opera in 1940 opposite Bidu Sayão in the title role.
