= Rüdiger Proske =

German television presenter and writer (1916–2010)

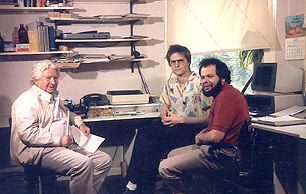
- Rüdiger Proske (left) during a 1984 interview
- Born: 26 December 1916; Berlin, Germany
- Died: 10 December 2010 (aged 93); Hamburg, Germany
- Education: University of Toronto; University of Saskatchewan
- Occupations: Journalist television producer/administrator author

Rüdiger Proske (26 December 1916 – 10 December 2010) was a prolific German author on politics and current affairs, a television journalist and a social democratic trades unionist. In 1961 he was a co-founder of the NDR current affairs programme Panorama (consciously modelled on its BBC namesake).

== Life ==
=== Provenance and early years ===
Rüdiger Proske was born in Berlin, the son of a senior railway official. He attended school first in Königsberg (as Kaliningrad was known before 1945) and then in Breslau (as Wrocław was known) before 1945). He was not quite 23 when war broke out. He trained as a fighter pilot and joined the air force (Luftwaffe). He was shot down over London in 1940 but survived and was transported as a prisoner of war to Canada. He now took the opportunity afforded by his detention to study English, French and Spanish. He then went on to study Political Sciences and Economics with the universities of Toronto and, more briefly, Saskatchewan. At least one source mentions that his study took place "in correspondence courses".

=== Journalism in post-war Germany ===
On returning to Germany he launched his journalistic career in March 1947 as a contributing editor to the monthly news magazine Frankfurter Hefte, recently founded by Eugen Kogon (1903–1987) and Walter Dirks (1901–1991). Of particular significance in the context is the influential essay he co-wrote with Walter Weymann-Weyhe headed "Wir aus dem Kriege: Der Weg der jüngere Generation" (loosely, "We from the war: The way of the younger generation") in which the authors formulated a self-image of the so-called "young generation" for the post-war years. He was in no doubt that Germany needed to focus on a closer collaboration with other European states. Between 1948 and 1951 he served as chairman of the "Bund Europäischer Jugend". With the central portion of Germany administered since 1945 as the increasingly separated Soviet occupation zone, Proske now found himself building his career in what became, after May 1949, the German Federal Republic (West Germany). In 1950/51 he teamed up with Charles Maignal to launch and operate a monthly Franco-German magazine.

=== Switch to radio ===
He moved to Hamburg in January 1952 when he began working for the Nordwestdeutscher Rundfunk (NWDR) broadcasting organisation, initially working in radio as head of the domestic policy department, and then as deputy head of political section and head of the features department. During this period there were some spectacular productions, such as Erich Kuby's "Nur noch rauchende Trümmer – das Ende der Festung Brest" ("Only smoking debris left – the end of Fortress Brest"), first transmitted by NWDR on 19 October 1954: the broadcast earned a forceful back-handed compliment in the form of a legal challenge from General Hermann-Bernhard Ramcke, the military commander in command of the German forces during the fighting. The trial ended in 1959 with an acquittal for the programme author and editor.

=== Switch to television ===
During the middle 1950s Proske teamed up with his colleagues Max Heimo Rehbein and Carsten Diercks to produce some of the country's first television documentaries such as, notably, the eight part series "Auf der Suche nach Frieden und Sicherheit" ("In search of Peace and Security," 1956/57) which dealt principally with the west's defence strategies and measures. This introduced Proske to developments in world of television which had been underway since 1953 at the NDR Hamburg-Lokstedt studios. With television opening up and coverage expanding rapidly in West Germany, in 1957 Walter Hilpert, the Rundfunkintendant (boss) at NWDR commissioned Proske, with others, to set up a regional television service, NDR. He was closely involved in setting up a current affairs department for the regional television service. In 1958 he became its head: in 1960 he was formally appointed editor-in-chief and given charge of the newly created "Nordschau" operation.

In this connection he was intimately involved in the 1961 launch of the NDR current affairs programme Panorama and its development during the next few years. The programme's first episode on 4 June 1961 made the headlines in the printed press, a pattern which was followed for some time with each successive feature. The programme did not, even at the outset, back away from contentious subjects and relationship with the newspaper establishment was not infrequently confrontational in view of the inherent rivalry between the two media. Public discussion triggered by the documentaries was not infrequently followed by legal disputes in the courts. The new programme increased the overt politicisation of television coverage in ways which under Proske's direction quickly became normalised, and moved the new medium firmly into the heart of the media firmament, but controversy was never far away. For those who value press freedom, a particularly important test arose in connection with the so-called Spiegel affair in 1961/62. The scandal had its origins in allegations of bribery implicating Defence Minister Strauss printed in Der Spiegel, but it escalated in 1962 when an article alleging major deficiencies in the nation's defence preparedness also appeared in Spiegel and elements in the government reacted by ordering the arrest of several journalists and Spiegel proprietor Rudolf Augstein. As matters turned out Augstein was detained for more than 100 days. There was outrage across the media establishment, while Proske's Panorama programme took a lead in condemning the government actions through the broadcast media. In the end the government backed down and the pugnacious Defence Minister Franz Josef Strauss resigned (though he resurfaced as Finance Minister four years later). For the Panorama editorial team the "affair" was an assault on journalistic freedom.

The often critical investigative journalism produced by the Panorama team around Proske of the programme triggered mounting unease and displeasure in some quarters. A particularly powerful critic was the energetic (and conservative) press baron Axel Springer: attacks from Springer newspapers became a focus of political pressure on NDR which became impossible to ignore. Sources differ over whether Rüdiger Proske resigned or simply "was fired" in Autumn/Fall 1963.

=== Television freelancer ===
After the end of 1963 Proske worked as a freelance film producer and journalist-commentator. Through production contacts with Studio Hamburg he was nevertheless able to continue working on the popular science series "Auf der Suche nach der Welt von morgen" ("Seeking tomorrow's world") which had originally launched in 1961. In the end there were 81 programmes which were highly successful not just in West Germany, but internationally. In 1965 he produced a 13 part series for NDR's Third Channel called "Ausblick auf die Zukunft" ("Future outlook") and in 1967 another 13 part series about Microbiology entitled "Die neue Welt der Biologie" ("The new world of biology"). He also made a large number of corporate films. In 1976 he set up his own television production company, "Projekt Studio Rüdiger Proske GmbH". which concentrated on documentaries and company training/promotional films. Private sector clients included Esso, Siemens, Volkswagen and Mercedes-Benz. In the public sector he produced films for the Ministry for Education and Research and the Interior Ministry: the European Union was another client. His last blockbuster television series, produced and transmitted over a couple of years between 1987 and 1989, was an 18 part series entitled "Mitten in Europa – Deutsche Geschichte" ("In the heart of Europe – German history"). Proske said he saw the series as his own contribution to helping Germany rediscover her lost identity: "We should understand where we came from and where we could be going". (Note: "Wir sollten verstehen, woher wir kommen und wohin wir gehen können.")

=== A sometimes outspoken retirement ===
Some people found Rüdiger Proske gratuitously critical, and he was certainly sure in own his sense of what was right and what was not: even in retirement he did not hesitate to court controversy where necessary. This aspect of his nature was on display in several short books from his final decades. His thoughtful 1996 book "Wider den Mißbrauch der Geschichte deutscher Soldaten zu politischen Zwecken", (Note: "Countering the misuse of the history of German soldiers for political objectives") running to just over 100 pages, and "Vom Marsch durch die Institutionen zum Krieg gegen die Wehrmacht" (Note: "From the intitutional march to was against the army") published in 1997 and more than twice as long, each resonated with critics and other readers enough to run to several editions. "Wider den liederlichen Umgang mit der Wahrheit. Anmerkungen zu einer umstrittenen Ausstellung" (Note: "Countering the careless treatment of truth. Remarks on a contentious exhibition") re-visited some of the same themes, but this time in the context of a large public "Army Exhibition" created by the Hamburg Institute for Social Research which toured Germany and Austria between 1995 and 1999. The exhibition took as its theme the war crimes of the German army between 1941 and 1944. Proske, as a widely respected surviving army veteran who was still a familiar personality for television viewers, proved to be one of its fiercest and most effective critics, though he was very far from being alone in his condemnation. Like other critics, Proske found the exhibition riddled with factual inaccuracies and bizarrely incomplete in its coverage.

Proske published various other books, mostly from the perspective of a science journalist. His film and television productions won numerous prizes, including several Grimme Awards.

== Output (selection) ==
=== Television programmes and reportages ===
- 1954: Derweil sich die Erde dreht
- 1957: Auf der Suche nach Frieden und Sicherheit (jointly with Max H. Rehbein and Carsten Diercks, 7 episodes)
- 1957: Pazifisches Tagebuch (zusammen mit Max H. Rehbein und Carsten Diercks, 5 episodes)
- 1961–1986: Auf der Suche nach der Welt von morgen (81 episodes)
- 1974: AOK – Um der Gesundheit Willen
- 1989: "Mitten in Europa – Deutsche Geschichte"

=== Books ===
- 1949: Probleme industrieller Arbeitsbedingungen, Verl. d. Frankfurter Hefte
- 1966: Zum Mond und weiter Bastei Verlag
- 1968: Unsere Welt – gestern, heute, morgen, 1800–2000 (Herbert Butze, Anton Zischka, Gerhard Linne, Axel Eggebrecht, Dr. Helga Tettenborn, Rüdiger Proske), Bertelsmann Lexikon Verlag
- 1968: Auf der Suche nach der Welt von morgen, 2 editions, Olde Hansen Verlag
- 1969: Der Mond. Das grösste Abenteuer unserer Zeit, 2 editions, Olde Hansen Verlag
- 1969: Station Mond, Olde Hansen Verlag
- 1969: Der Mond, Buch und Zeit Verlagsgesellschaft Köln
- 1971: Modelle und Elemente künftiger Gesellschaften, (Rüdiger Proske, Jörg Klamroth, Heiner Thömen), RoRoRo Verlag
- 1972: Am Ende unserer Zukunft, Olde Hansen Verlag
- 1973: Reisen rund um diese Welt, (Rüdiger Proske, Max H. Rehbein) Olde Hansen Verlag
- 1976: Die Grundlagen des Spätmarxismus (Hans Jürgen Eysenck, Horst Nachtigall, Ernst Topitsch, Rüdiger Proske), Verlag A.G.Bonn aktuell
- 1985 Zukunftsbewältigung., Rowohlt TB-V., Rnb.
- 1989: Völkerkunde, die uns angeht., Bertelsmann Vlg., M.
- 1989: Mitten in Europa – Deutsche Geschichte, The book of the television series
- 1992: Das Ende der Politik Ullstein Verlag
- 1996: Wider den Missbrauch der Geschichte deutscher Soldaten zu politischen Zwecken, v.Hase & Koehler Verlag
- 1999: Wider den liederlichen Umgang mit der Wahrheit, v.Hase & Koehler Verlag
- 2002: Vom Marsch durch die Institutionen zum Krieg gegen die Wehrmacht, v.Hase & Koehler Verlag

== Awards and honours (selection) ==
- 1957: First Television Prize from the Society of the Friends of Television
- 1957: Futura Prize
- 1965: Gold Medal at the Film Festival of the First World Transport Exhibition
- 1965: Second Prize at Sixth International Film Festival, Rouan
- 1966: Two honorable recognitions at the Adolf Grimme Awards
- 1966: Two Arts Film awards from the Interior Minister
- 1967: Adolf Grimme Prize in silver
- 1970: Bronze Award Film & TV-Festival of New York
- 1972: Special Prize from the Association of German Foundations for the Arts and Humanities (Stifterverband für die Deutsche Wissenschaft) at the Adolf Grimme Awards
- 1980–1987: Six prizes from the Economics Ministry
- 1989: Bavarian Television Prize for the TV series Mitten in Europa – Deutsche Geschichte
