= Rita Bake =

German economic and social historian

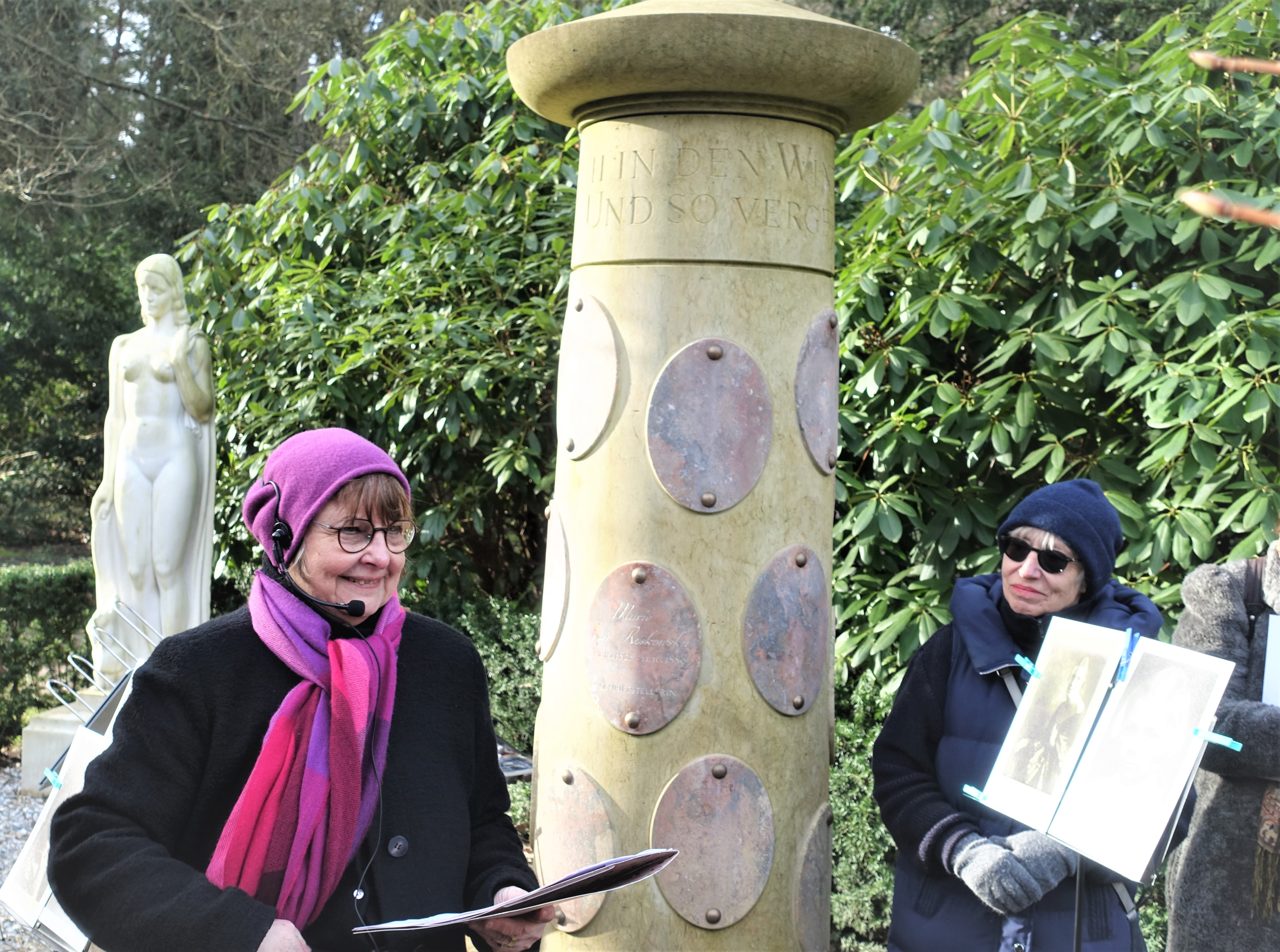
- Born: 16 January 1952 (age 74); Bremerhaven, Germany
- Education: Hamburg University of Applied Sciences; University of Hamburg
- Occupations: Economic and social historian

Rita Bake (born 16 January 1952) is a German economic and social historian. She has a degree in librarianship and is a prolific author. She was a founder in 2000/2001 of the "Garden of Women" ("Garten der Frauen") at the vast Ohlsdorf Cemetery on the edge of Hamburg.

== Biography ==
Rita Bake was born in Bremerhaven. She studied for a degree in librarianship at the Hamburg University of Applied Sciences. After that she moved on to the University of Hamburg where she studied Social and Economic History and Folklore along with Early and Pre-History. She concluded this phase of her education with a doctorate. The work for her dissertation concerned women's employment in the manufacturing sector in pre-industrial Germany. Among other roles she worked as a lecturer on the History of Women as part of the Women's Study and Research programme of University of Hamburg. At the Hamburg University of Applied Sciences and at the "Historical seminar" of University of Hamburg she taught "Librarianship and Information".

In 1990 Bake started working in a senior academic and administrative role (als "wissenschaftliche Referentin") at the Hamburg region "Agency for Civic Education" ("Landeszentrale für politische Bildung"). She served between 2004 and the end of 2017 as deputy head of the agency. The agency publishes detailed information on social and regional history of Hamburg, also covering politics and political institutions. There has, during Bake's time at the agency, been an increased focus on women's history. The agency also designs and implements historically based city tours and exhibitions.

In 2000, with the active help of the historian-politician Silke Urbanski and of the journalist-politician Helga Diercks-Norden, Bake founded the "Garden of Women" ("Garten der Frauen") at Hamburg's Ohlsdorf Cemetery. It is claimed to be only place of its kind in the world. All three women were feminist activists. The "Garden" is a memorial location for significant women, to which historical grave stones can be transferred after heirs and representatives of the deceased are no longer able (or willing) to pay for the upkeep of the grave in its original location. It is also available as a last resting place for significant women who had died since its inception. Since 2000 Bake has served as chair of the (exclusively voluntary) "Garden of Women Association". At the time of the project launch Bake was asked about the gender separation implicit in the whole idea: "Are not all people equal, at least in death?". The question was one which Bake had evidently considered already: "Sadly, no. Because the achievements of women are often not adequately valued while they are alive, they will be forgotten even more quickly after death than in the case of men".

Since 2007 she has teamed up with fellow historian Beate Meyer of the "Institute for the History of German Jewry in Hamburg" to head up and work as compiler-editor for the series, "Stolpersteine in the districts of Hamburg". 17 volumes had already appeared by September 2016. In April 2010 this project was celebrated with the awarding of the Lappenberg Medal from the Verein für Hamburgische Geschichte.

In 2012 Bake developed Hamburg's first on-line databank of women's biographies. She continues to feed the databank with additional biographical material. In 2015 she instigated another on-line databank for the city, the so-called "Dabeigewesene Databank" which focuses on the experiences of those who lived through the Hitler years in Hamburg.

== Recognition ==
In 2009 Bake was the winner of "Hammonia 2009", presented by the Hamburg region Women's Council ("Landesfrauenrat") in recognition of her feminist political commitment.
