= Helga Diercks-Norden =

German politician and journalist

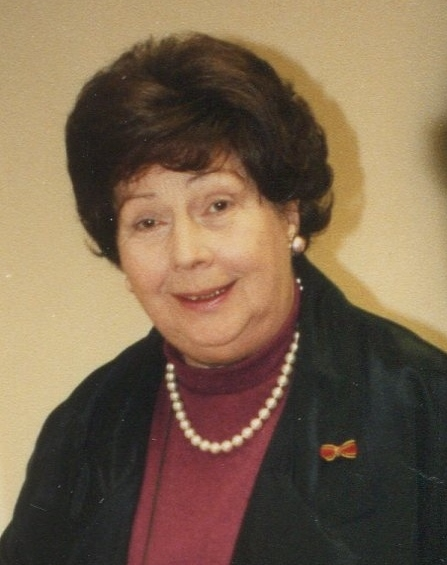
- ca. 1993
- Born: Helga Kehrein; 6 April 1924; Berlin, Germany
- Died: July 12, 2011 (aged 87); Hamburg, Germany
- Occupations: journalist politician
- Political party: NSDAP (briefly); CDU
- Spouse: Carsten Diercks (1921-2009)
- Children: 1

Helga Diercks-Norden (born Helga Kehrein: 6 April 1924 - 12 July 2011) was a German journalist and feminist activist. Later she moved into politics (CDU), serving briefly as a member of the Hamburg Parliament during 1977-78.

Helga Norden was a pseudonym used for her professional work, which later became a household name nationwide after she switched to television journalism.

== Life ==
=== Provenance and early years ===
Helga Kehrein was born and grew up in Berlin. After successfully completing her schooling she studied art history and theatrecraft ("Kunstgeschichte und Theaterwissenschaften"), also undertaking various internships with Berlin daily newspapers. She went on to work as a reporter. In 1942 she was 18. Her application to join Germany's ruling Nazi Party was accepted in September of that year (membership number 9,125,138). Sources suggest that peer group pressure to try and join "the movement" would have been considerable at the time. Records indicate that at this point she was still single and living at an address in central Berlin (Münchenerstraße 47). In her denazification questionnaire (Fragebogen), Diercks-Norden 1946 didn’t mention her NSDAP membership. Being then confronted with her membership card she confirmed that the card was related to her but that she had never applied to the Nazi Party and had never paid any membership fee. The only explanation she could think of was that her father, a Kreisleiter in Berlin, had filed for her to join the NSDAP without her knowing, as the NSDAP would have considered it very important that family members of leading party members became party members as well.

=== Broadcaster ===
By 1946 she had married Carsten Diercks (1921-2009), described at the time as a cameraman and described decades later on his grave stone with he single word "Fernsehpionier" ("television pioneer") She became known by her married name as "Helga Diercks-Norden". Their son was born in 1955. It was in 1946 that she began to work as a freelance reporter for the Nordwestdeutscher Rundfunk (broadcasting company), based in Hamburg which by this time was administered as part of the British occupation zone. Her appointment was seen as remarkable because she was the company's first female reporter. She was a presenter of the NDR Hamburg Harbour Concert broadcasts, and by the mid 1950s had become a regular presenter of a number of popular television series, such as "Umschau/Mittag am Abend", the radio travel programme "Zwischen Hamburg und Haiti", Hamburg Harbour Concert and "Funkbilder aus Niedersachsen" ("Radio pictures from Lower Saxony"). This last series involved pitching up in the main square of a succession small town with an outside broadcasting unit and one of the iconic Übertragungswagen ("broadcasting trucks") and from there producing live transmissions to audiences without studio intervention. Many of these reportages were broadcast across German and gave their presenter a national profile. By 1956 her reporting roles were complemented increasingly by editorial duties in the broadcaster's features department and main editorial office. Another contribution during these early years was her involvement with a team of colleagues in creating the series "Sonntagsfamilientisch für Flüchtlinge aus der DDR" (loosely: "Sunday family lunchtime for refugees from the other Germany").

From 1957 she was increasingly engaged with the growth of television. She was the first female NDR television reporter to report from across the entire region covered by the company's remit, increasingly taking charge not just of the reporting work but also directing camera work and appearing in studio discussions in moderator/interviewer roles. She also began making her own film reports for incorporation in regional afternoon magazine programmes. Diercks-Norden also took over, briefly, directorship of the political series "Themen der Woche" ("The week's themes").

In 1963, with her husband and her son, she moved to India. Carsten Diercks had been sent to set up a television studio for NDR, with the backing of Information Minister Indira Gandhi. In India Helga Diercks-Norden established herself as the officially accredited correspondent for Radio Bern, Switzerland's Die Weltwoche magazine and Zürich Television. In New Delhi the Foreign Correspondents' Press Club had to revise its statutes which had originally been drawn up under circumstances in which it was unthinkable for any one individual to be both a foreign correspondent and a woman.

She remained in India till 1973 when the family returned to Hamburg and Diercks-Norden resumed her career as a freelance journalist.

=== Politics ===
Helga Diercks-Norden joined the centre-right CDU (party) in 1960. She was appointed a member of the Hamburg Parliament ("Hamburgische Bürgerschaft ") in April 1977, taking the seat vacated through the resignation of her party colleague Carsten Clausen at the end of 1976, but she did not contest her seat in the local elections of June 1978.

The focus of her political work was in the field of women's rights. She involved herself in a number of relevant national and international organisations . She was a member of the Hamburg Region Women's Council ("Landesfrauenrat "), elected to chair it between 1986 and 1990, subsequently elected to a position as honorary chair. She was also a delegate to the Geneva-based International Alliance of Women.
