= Thomas Meyer (political scientist) =

Professor of political science

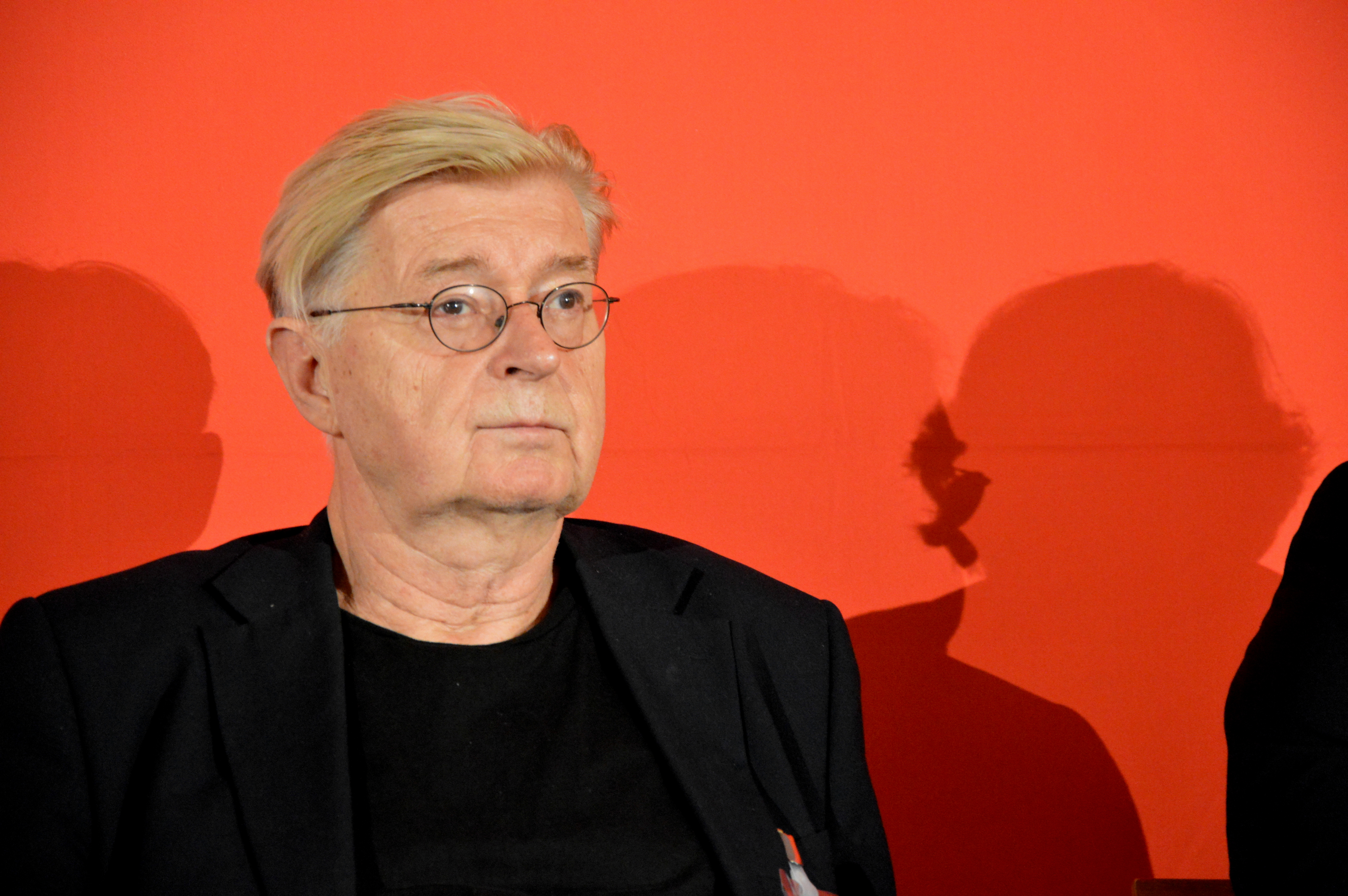
Thomas Meyer, 2015.

Thomas Meyer is a German political scientist and professor emeritus at Dortmund University.

== Life ==
Thomas Meyer studied philosophy, political science, and German literature at the University of Frankfurt. In 1973, he received a doctoral degree at Frankfurt for a dissertation about the role of the proletarian in Karl Marx's theory of liberation. He received the Habilitation from the Free University of Berlin in 1977. In later years, Meyer has studied the role of the media in modern politics and has become a noted critic of the way the media influences the style and content of political debates. His term "media democracy" highlights the decisive role of media in political processes. He is a member of the Social Democratic Party of Germany and is the vice-chairman of the party's committee on fundamental principles. He has also written several books on the history and theory of social democracy.

== Neue Gesellschaft/Frankfurter Hefte (NGFH) ==
Meyer is editor of the journal Neue Gesellschaft/Frankfurter Hefte (NGFH) (New Society/Frankfurt Issues).

== EU work ==
Meyer was a member of the European Commission's Social Sciences and Humanities Advisory Group and is an individual expert in the EU-NESCA Project.

== Publications ==
- The Theory of Social Democracy (with Lewis Hinchman) - Cambridge 2007 - ISBN 0-7456-4113-X
- Was ist Politik? - Wiesbaden, 2006 - ISBN 3-8100-3545-9
- Theorie der sozialen Demokratie (with Lew Hinchman and Nicole Breyer) - Wiesbaden, 2005 - ISBN 3-531-14612-2
- Die Identität Europas. Der EU eine Seele? - Frankfurt am Main, 2004 - ISBN 3-518-12355-6
- Identitätspolitik. Vom Missbrauch kultureller Unterschiede - Frankfurt am Main, 2002 - ISBN 3-518-12272-X
- Mediokratie: die Kolonisierung der Politik durch die Medien - Frankfurt am Main, 2001 - ISBN 3-518-12204-5
- Die Inszenierung des Politischen: zur Theatralität von Mediendiskursen (with Rüdiger Ontrup and Christian Schicha) - Opladen, 2000 - ISBN 3-531-13433-7
- Politik als Theater : die neue Macht der Darstellungskunst (with Martina Kampmann) - Berlin, 1998 - ISBN 3-351-02477-0
