= Netz über Bord – Heringsfang auf der Nordsee =

Netz über Bord - Heringsfang auf der Nordsee
- Directed by: Jürgen Roland
- Written by: Jürgen Roland
- Cinematography: Carsten Diercks
- Edited by: Carsten Diercks
- Distributed by: NDR
- Release date: 1955
- Running time: 44 min.
- Language: German

Netz über Bord – Heringsfang auf der Nordsee (Net on board – herring fishing on the North Sea), is a 1955 German documentary about the herring fishing industry written and directed by Jürgen Roland.

Jürgen Roland and Carsten Diercks documented fishermen's hard work on the waters of the North Sea when the era of traditional fishing was coming to an end, just before the arrival of the big trawlers.

== See also ==
- Herring Hunt, a 1953 Canadian documentary about herring fishing in British Columbia
