= Peter Merseburger =

German journalist and author (1928–2022)

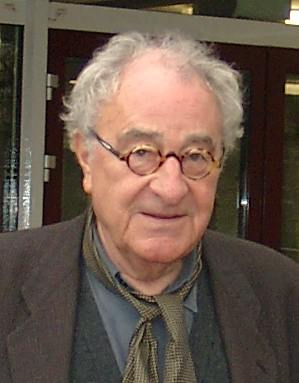
- Merseburger in 2004
- Born: 9 May 1928; Zeitz, Saxony, Prussia, Germany
- Died: 15 February 2022 (aged 93); Berlin, Germany
- Education: University of Wittenberg; University of Marburg
- Occupations: Correspondent; Television presenter; Biographer
- Organizations: Der Spiegel; NDR; ARD
- Awards: Das politische Buch; Deutscher Bücherpreis; Order of Merit of the Federal Republic of Germany

Peter Merseburger (9 May 1928 – 15 February 2022) was a German journalist and author. After working for newspapers and the magazine Der Spiegel, he moved to the broadcaster Norddeutscher Rundfunk (NDR) in 1965. He became known as a television presenter of the political magazine Panorama that he moderated from 1967 to 1975, presenting controversial themes. From 1977, he was a correspondent for ARD in several capital cities such as Washington, D.C., East Berlin and London. After retirement in 1991, he turned to writing biographies of influential persons including Kurt Schumacher, Willy Brandt, Rudolf Augstein, and Theodor Heuss.

== Life ==
Merseburger was born in Zeitz, Saxony, Prussia, Germany, the second child of the artist Karl Erich Merseburger and his wife Gertrud, née Troeger. After World War II, he was arrested when he distributed posters for the CDU before an election. He studied German studies, modern history (Neuere Geschichte) and sociology at the University of Wittenberg.

Merseburger moved to West Germany, became a member of the SPD in 1950, and completed his studies at the University of Marburg. He began journalistic work with the Hannoversche Presse. He moved on to Norddeutscher Rundfunk (NDR) in 1956, and then to the Neue Ruhr-Zeitung. From 1960, he was correspondent for the magazine Der Spiegel, researching in Berlin and Brussels.

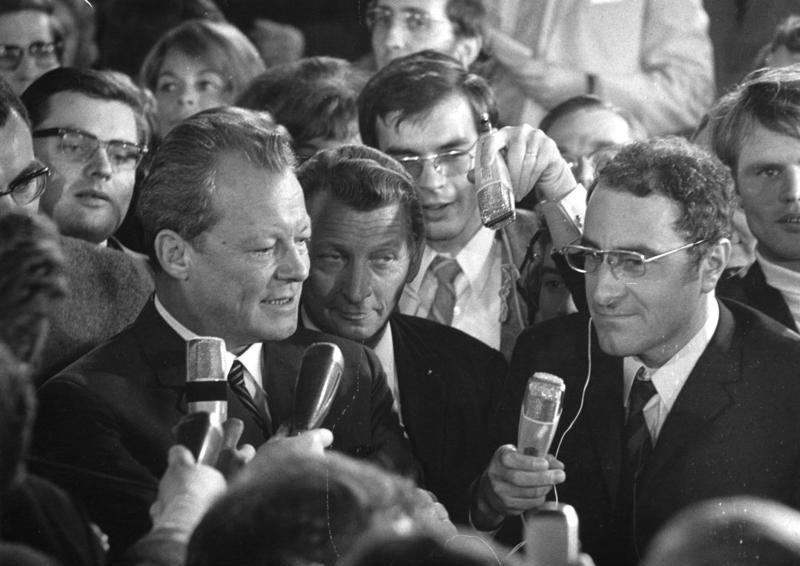
Willy Brandt (left) and Merseburger in 1969

He returned to NDR in 1965. From January 1967 to April 1975, he was television presenter of the political magazine Panorama, succeeding Joachim Fest. It was produced by NDR and broadcast by ARD. The broadcasts, leaning towards the student movement of the 1960s, often caused controversy. The popular magazine, with ratings often more than 30%, covered topics such as the dark side of the "economic miracle" (Wirtschaftswunder), chancellor Willy Brandt's Ostpolitik, and the desire for social liberalisation. In 1974, a contribution by Alice Schwarzer about abortion was cancelled, and Merseburger refused to moderate the broadcast.

From 1969, he was also editor-in-chief and head of the department of current affairs (Chefredakteur und Leiter der Hauptabteilung Zeitgeschehen) of the NDR. From 1977, he was correspondent and studio director of the ARD in capital cities such as Washington, D.C. (1977–1982), East Berlin (1982–1987) and London (1987–1991). From Berlin, he ran a series Deutsches aus der anderen Republik (German affairs from the other republic) which enlightened audiences in West and East about unknown aspects of everyday life in the GDR.

He retired in 1991, and then worked as a freelance writer, living in Berlin and southern France. He was a member of the PEN-Zentrum Deutschland. He focused on biographies of persons influential in his lifetime, such as Kurt Schumacher, one of the founding fathers of postwar German democracy, Willy Brandt, the chancellor who prepared German reunification, Rudolf Augstein, the founder and publisher of Der Spiegel, and Theodor Heuss, the first Bundespräsident after World War II. For the Augstein biography, written over four years, he was the first journalist to research Augstein's correspondence, a prerequisite for depth, balance and authenticity. He also interviewed people from Augstein's publishing house, friends and family. Merseburger published an autobiography in 2021, Aufbruch ins Ungewisse (Departure to the uncertain).

== Personal life ==
Merseburger was married in second marriage to Sabine Rüdiger and was the father of two children. Merseburger's son Stephan Merseburger is also a journalist.

Merseburger died in Berlin on 15 February 2022, at the age of 93. Joachim Knuth, intendant of NDR, said that his contributions were "rhetorically brilliant, combative and courageous" ("rhetorisch brillant, streitbar und mutig") and added that his passion, acumen and resilience would be remembered ("Seine Leidenschaft, sein Scharfsinn und seine Widerstandskraft bleiben unvergessen").

== Awards ==
The jury of the 2008 Leuchtturm Prize noted that Merseburger was "a meticulous researcher and courageous publicist who does not conform to the zeitgeist but always enlivens public discourse with clever arguments and interesting ideas. With his sheer tireless creative power and analytical brilliance, Merseburger acts as a role model for independent quality journalism" ("ein akribischer Rechercheur und mutiger Publizist, der sich dem Zeitgeist nicht anpasst, sondern stets mit klugen Argumenten und interessanten Ideen den öffentlichen Diskurs belebt. Mit seiner schier unermüdlichen Schaffenskraft und analytischen Brillianz wirkt Merseburger als Vorbild für unabhängigen Qualitätsjournalismus").

- Das politische Buch from the Friedrich-Ebert-Stiftung for the Schumacher biography (1996)
- Deutscher Bücherpreis for the Brandt biography (2003)
- Leuchtturm-Preis from Netzwerk Recherche for the Augstein biography and his lifetime achievements (2008)
- Honorary Citizen of Zeitz (2008)
- Officer's Cross of the Order of Merit of the Federal Republic of Germany (2018)

== Publications ==
- Die unberechenbare Vormacht. Wohin steuern die USA? dtv, Munich 1985, ISBN 978-3-423-10433-3.
- Grenzgänger. Innenansichten der anderen deutschen Republik. Bertelsmann, Munich 1988, ISBN 3-570-04746-6.
- Der schwierige Deutsche Kurt Schumacher. Eine Biographie. DVA, Stuttgart 1995, ISBN 3-421-05021-X.
- with Hermann Lübbe, Jürgen Kocka et al.: Von der Bonner zur Berliner Republik: Öffentlichkeit und öffentlicher Raum zu Berlin. 1998, ISBN 978-3-929273-18-2
- Mythos Weimar. Zwischen Geist und Macht. Munich 2013, ISBN 978-3-423-30787-1.
- Willy Brandt, 1913–1992. Visionär und Realist. DVA, Stuttgart 2002, ISBN 3-423-34097-5.
- Rudolf Augstein. DVA, Stuttgart 2007, ISBN 978-3-421-05852-2.
- Theodor Heuss. Der Bürger als Präsident. DVA, Munich 2012, ISBN 978-3-421-04481-5.
- Aufbruch ins Ungewisse. Erinnerungen eines politischen Zeitgenossen. DVA, Munich 2021, ISBN 978-3-421-04815-8.

Reviews

- Karasek, Hellmuth (21 September 2007). "Zur Biographie Rudolf Augsteins: Der Mantel der Geschichte". Der Spiegel. (in German)
