= Panorama (German TV program) =

German television magazine

- Genre: current affairs magazine
- Created by: Rüdiger Proske
- Inspired by: Panorama
- Presented by: Anja Reschke
- Country of origin: Germany
- Original language: German

Production
- Producer: Norddeutscher Rundfunk

Original release
- Network: ARD
- Release: 4 June 1961

Panorama is the oldest German current affairs television magazine, first aired on 4 June 1961. It is produced by Norddeutscher Rundfunk (NDR), and is aired every third week on Thursdays at 21:45, alternating with Monitor and Kontraste by Das Erste. Anja Reschke has been moderator since 2001. It became popular, with often controversial topics leading to broader discussions and legal consequences.

== History ==
Panorama was initiated in 1961 by Rüdiger Proske, then director of the department of current events (Hauptabteilungsleiter Zeitgeschehen) of Norddeutscher Rundfunk (NDR). It was designed following the model of the successful Panorama that the BBC had aired from 1953. It was the first political television magazine in Germany, aired by ARD.

In 2008, a new format began, Panorama – Die Reporter. Its reports, including about the textile company KiK and the 2017 G20 Hamburg summit, received several awards. In 2012, NDR started a weekly program, Panorama 3, aired regionally on NDR Fernsehen; Panorama 3 was moderated by Susanne Stichler until 2021, and then by Aimen Abdulaziz-Said and Lea Struckmeier alternating.

== Controversies ==
Critical reports often caused legal persecution. In 1962, police arrested a Panorama team in Geldern for filming for a report about a teacher who had been an SS guard under the Nazi regime. In fall the same year, members of the federal government criticised Panorama for "torpedoing" its measures ("Maßnahmen der Bundesregierung zu torpedieren").

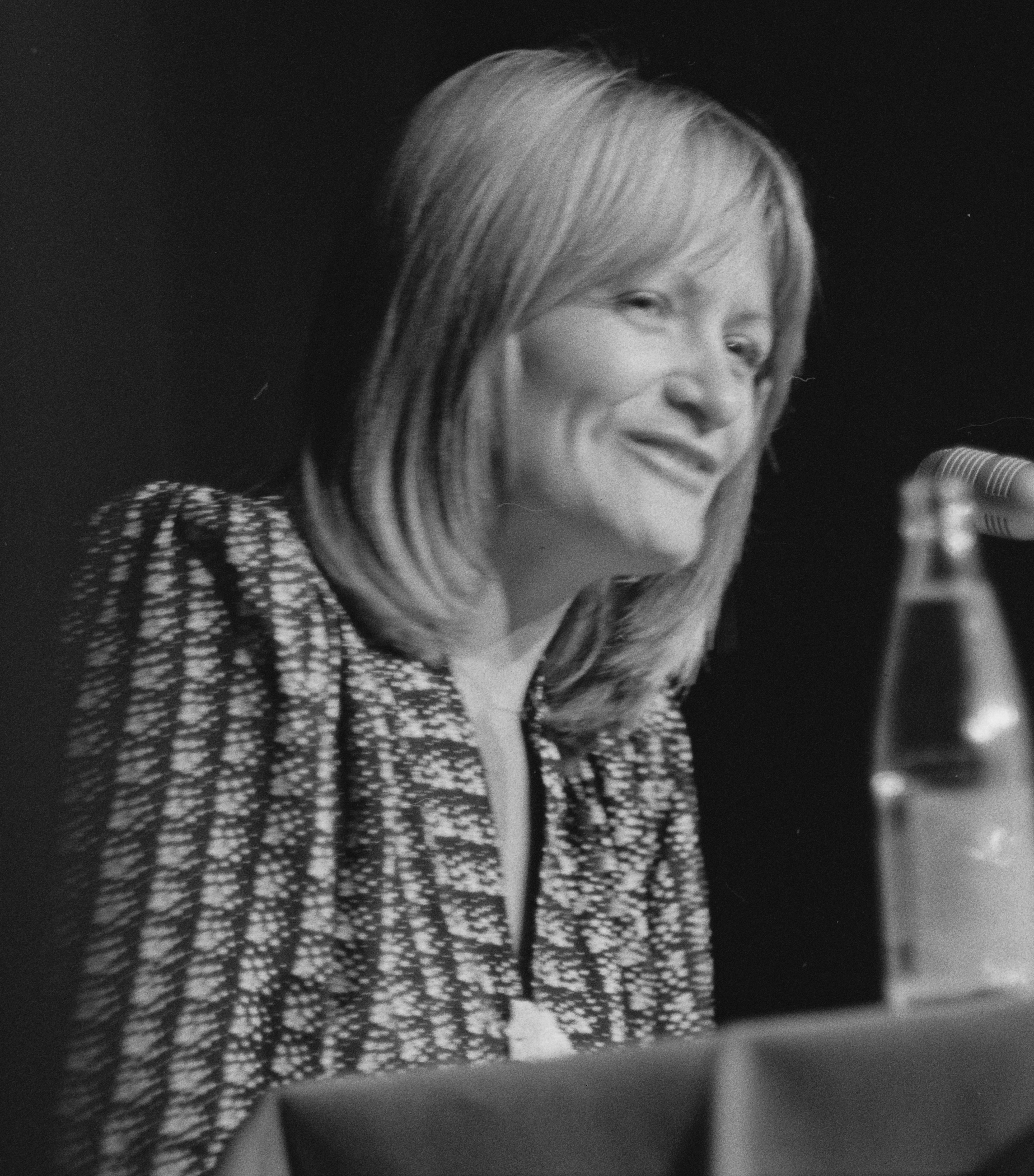
Alice Schwarzer c. 1977

In 1974, when Peter Merseburger ran the magazine, a report about an abortion by Alice Schwarzer, at the time a criminal act, was cancelled by authorities (Intendantenkonferenz) last minute. Merseburger did not moderate the broadcast in protest, and a speaker read his texts.

After a series of reports in 1978 about the Brokdorf Nuclear Power Plant, the NDR state contract was terminated. In 1988, a lawyer of Oskar Lafontaine prevented a critical report minutes before the broadcast began.

In 2003, the former chancellor Helmut Kohl evaded a question from a Panorama reporter, saying that Panorama had "nothing to do with journalism" ("Ich habe überhaupt nicht die Absicht mit Ihnen 'n Interview (zu machen […] Sie sind doch von „Panorama“ [...] Wissen's doch, was das heißt. Sie haben doch mit Journalismus nix zu tun.“).

== Awards ==
In 2018, authors of Panorama received the Grimme-Preis for exceptional journalism (besondere journalistische Leistung) in the category "Information und Kultur" for a report of the 2017 G20 Hamburg summit. In March 2020, the Panorama authors Nadia Kailouli and Jonas Schreijäg received the Grimme-Preis for their documentary SeaWatch3.

== Moderators ==
- Gert von Paczensky (1961–1963)
- Rolf Menzel (1961–1963)
- Joachim Besser (1961–1963)
- Rüdiger Proske (1961–1963)
- Jürgen Neven-du Mont (1963)
- Werner Baecker (1963)
- Manfred Jenke (1963)
- Walter Menningen (1963)
- Guido Schütte (1963)
- Dietrich Koch (1963–1964)
- Eugen Kogon (1964)
- Joachim Fest (1965–1966)
- Peter Merseburger (1967–1975)
- Gerhard Bott (1975–1976)
- Ulrich Happel (1977)
- Winfried Scharlau (1978–1981)
- Peter Gatter (1981–1987)
- Joachim Wagner (1987–1996)
- Patricia Schlesinger (1997–2001)
- Anja Reschke (from 2001)

== Literature ==
- Anja Reschke: Die Unbequemen. Wie Panorama die Republik verändert hat. Redline-Verlag, Munich 2011, ISBN 978-3-86881-306-7, OCLC 847629666.
