= Neue Gesellschaft/Frankfurter Hefte =

German magazine

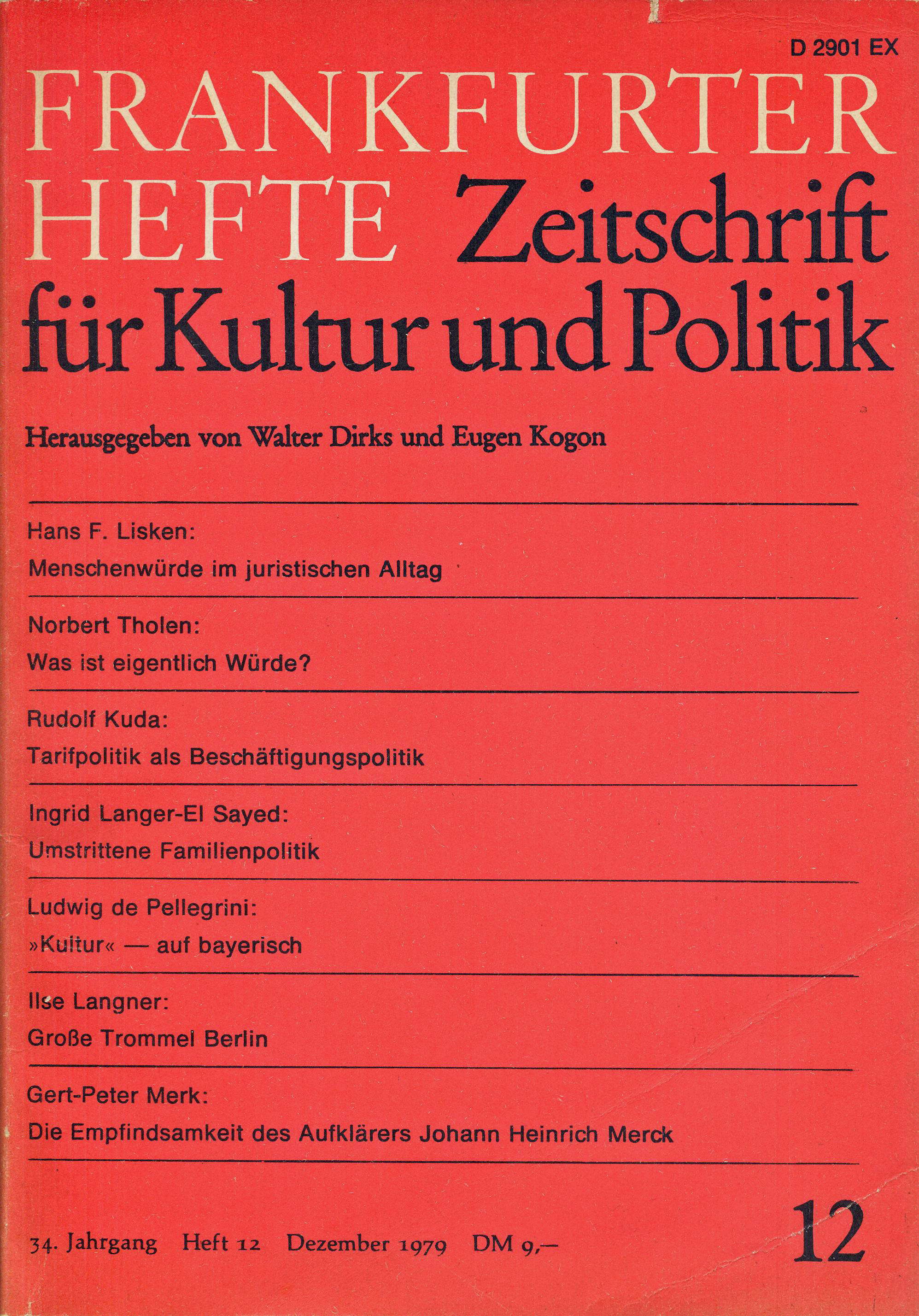
Issue December 1979

Neue Gesellschaft/Frankfurter Hefte is a German monthly political journal (with two double issues in January and July). As its name implies it resulted from the merger in 1985 of two magazines Neue Gesellschaft and Frankfurter Hefte. It has existed in its present form since 1985, when the SPD-related journal Neue Gesellschaft, founded in 1954, took over the Frankfurter Hefte, which had been published since 1946 and were originally produced in the left Catholic milieu.

== History ==
Neue Gesellschaft was a theory journal in the social democratic movement founded in 1954 after the defeat of the SPD in the elections in 1953. Its founding editors were Willi Eichler and Carlo Schmid. Frankfurter Hefte was founded in 1946. It has a left-leaning Catholic approach. Its founders included Eugen Kogon and Walter Dirks.

Today, the Neue Gesellschaft/Frankfurter Hefte, sees itself as a political cultural journal that aims to provide both a diagnosis of the times and future perspectives. Since the 1990s, key subject have been the processes of democratisation in Eastern and Central Europe, civil society and communitarian models of society, the confrontation with the totalitarian past, the development of new media, the future of the globalisation and migration.

Thomas Meyer has been the editor of the Neue Gesellschaft/Frankfurter Hefte journal, since the death of Peter Glotz. In addition to Meyer, the following editors are currently (as of December 2018) acting as editors on behalf of the Friedrich Ebert Foundation: Kurt Beck, Jürgen Kocka, Bascha Mika, Andrea Nahles and Wolfgang Thierse.

Since 2012, an English-language edition with the subtitle Journal of Social Democracy has been published quarterly. It contains translations of selected articles from the German version.

== Literature ==
- Michel Grunewald: “'Christian Socialists' in the first post-war years: The Frankfurter Hefte”, in: Michel Grunewald, Uwe Puschner (eds.), Le milieu intellectuel catholique en Allemagne, sa presse et ses reseaux ( 1871–1963) / The Catholic intellectual milieu in Germany, its press and its networks (1871–1963). Peter Lang, Bern 2006, pp. 459–481.
- Josef P. Mautner: “Deconstruction of Christianity. Left-wing Catholicism and the present", in: Richard Faber (ed.): Catholicism in history and the present, Königshausen & Neumann, Würzburg 2005, pp. 227–254.
- Karl Prümm: Walter Dirks and Eugen Kogon as Catholic journalists of the Weimar Republic. Heidelberg 1984.
- Karl Prümm: "Designs for a second republic in the 'Frankfurter Hefte' 1946–1949", in: Thomas Koebner, Gert Sauttermeister, Sigrid Schneider (eds.): Germany after Hitler. Future plans in exile and from the occupation period 1939–1945. Opladen 1987, pp. 330–343.
- Gabriel Rolfes: "The place of new beginnings, I said, will have to be the magazine": Eugen Kogon and Walter Dirks as editors of the Frankfurter Hefte in the early Federal Republic. In: Alexander Gallus, Sebastian Liebold, Frank Schale (eds.): Measurements of an Intellectual History of the Early Federal Republic. Göttingen 2020, pp. 333–350, ISBN 978-3-8353-3472-4.
- Benedikt Brunner, Thomas Großbölting, Klaus Große Kracht, Meik Woyke (eds.): "Say what is". Walter Dirks in the intellectual and political constellations of Germany and Europe. Bonn: JHW Dietz Nachf. 2019 (Political and Social History series; 105), ISBN 978-3-8012-4233-6.
