= Anja Reschke =

German journalist and TV presenter (born 1972)

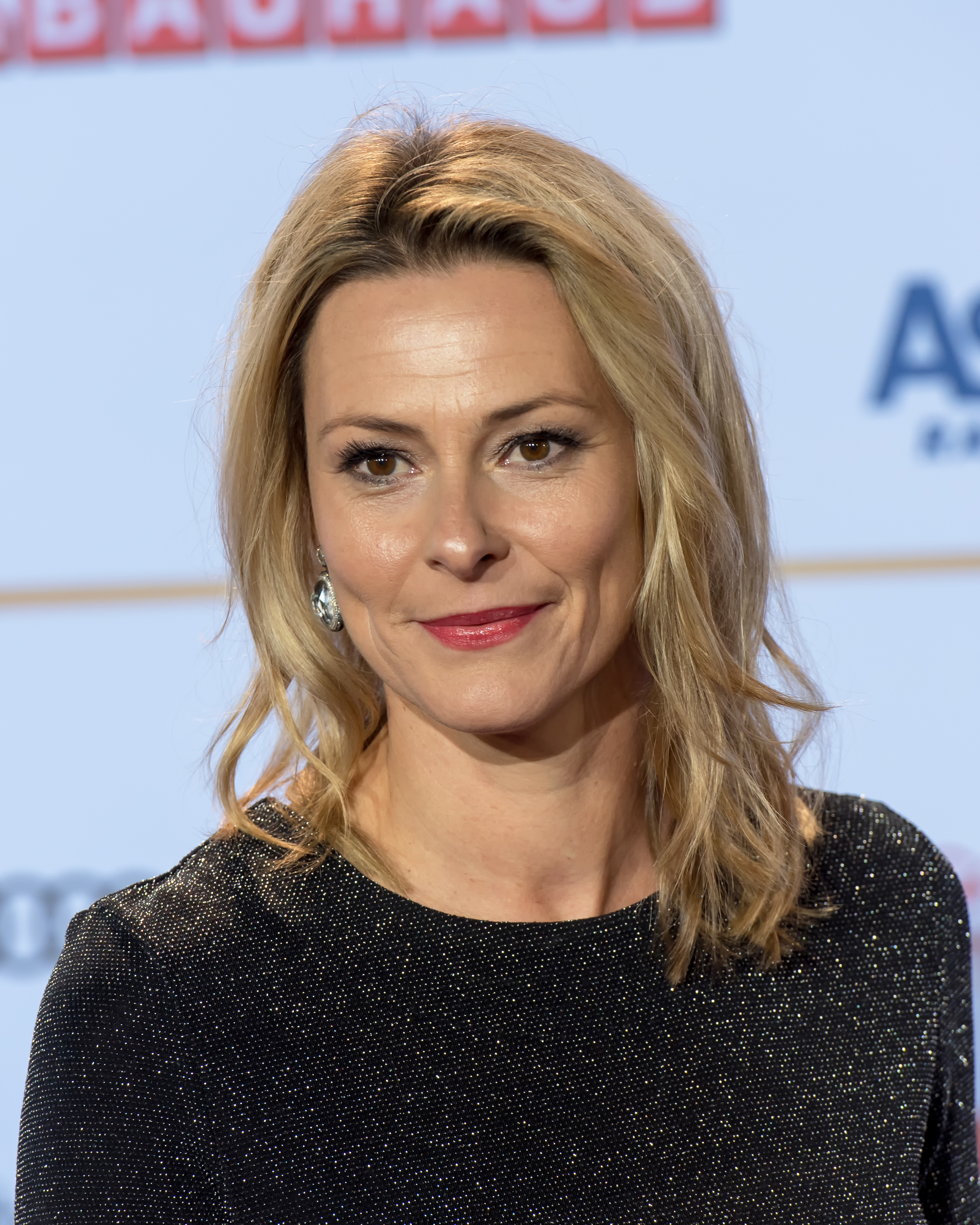
- Reschke in 2016
- Born: 7 October 1972 (age 53); Munich, West Germany (now Germany)
- Occupations: Journalist, TV presenter
- Spouse: Henning Rütten
- Children: 2

Anja Reschke (born 7 October 1972, Munich, Germany) is a German journalist and television presenter.

== Life ==
Reschke was born in Munich in 1972, then part of West Germany. She studied political science at LMU Munich. After a traineeship at Norddeutscher Rundfunk (NDR), she worked as a freelance journalist for various programmes.

In 2001, Reschke began presenting the political television magazine Panorama and the following year the show ZAPP. She also presents Wissen vor acht ("Knowledge ante 8 PM").

In 2018, she won the Hanns Joachim Friedrichs Award and the Hildegard von Bingen Prize for Journalism.

In 2019, Reschke was appointed director of NDR's culture and documentation area. The same year, she received the Siebenpfeiffer Prize for her commitment to protecting and upholding the freedom of the press. With creating her own show Reschke Fernsehen in 2023 she gave up the position.

== Filmography ==
- 2000: Politiker und die Zweitwohnungssteuer
- 2000: Die Kohl-Rolle
- 2003: Reach for the Stars as Katja
- 2010: Das Märchen von der Chancengleichheit
- 2011: Die Nacht der politischen Magazine
- 2011: Das Lügenfernsehen
- 2011: Die Biolüge
- 2012: Energiewende: Größenwahn statt Megaplan
- 2013: Unter Lehrern
- 2016: Samira (short film) as journalist

== Works ==
- Pech gehabt. Versendet sich. In: Stephan Weichert (publisher): Wozu noch Journalismus? Wie das Internet einen Beruf verändert. Mit einem Geleitwort von Heribert Prantl, Vandenhoeck & Ruprecht, Göttingen 2010, ISBN 978-3-525-30004-6, p. 153 ff.
- Die Unbequemen. Wie Panorama die Republik verändert hat. Redline-Verlag, Munich 2011, ISBN 978-3-86881-306-7.
- as editor: Und das ist erst der Anfang. Deutschland und die Flüchtlinge. Rowohlt Polaris, Reinbek bei Hamburg 2015, ISBN 978-3-499-63184-9.
- Haltung zeigen! Rowohlt, Reinbek bei Hamburg 2018, ISBN 978-3-499-63424-6.
