= Silke Urbanski =

German politician, author and historian (born 1964)

Silke Urbanski (born 5 February 1964) is an historian, an author and a former politician (SPD). For many years she held a teaching position for Middle-ages history at the Historisches Seminar (loosely, "Historical faculty") at the University of Hamburg, but she resigned in 2005 as a protest against the decision by the Hamburg Senate to introduce student tuition fees. (University tuition fees were scrapped a few years later in Hamburg, following a change of government at the state level.)

== Biography ==
Silke Urbanski was born in Hamburg. She successfully completed her school career in 1983 and moved on to the University of Hamburg where she studied History, Philosophy and Teaching sciences. She took a year abroad in 1986/87, teaching at a school in Richmond upon Thames on the south-western edge of London, England, before returning to Hamburg in order to progress her academic career. Meanwhile, in 1986 she had joined the (German) Social Democratic Party.

=== History ===
She was employed at the University of Hamburg between 1989 and 1997 (with a break in 1991/92) initially as a research assistant and later with a teaching contract. She received her doctorate in 1996 for a piece of work on the eventful history of the St. Johannis Monastery in the northern part of the city centre. The dissertation was quickly adapted for publication.

From 1997 Urbanski has worked as a teacher at the Max-Brauer-Schule (secondary school) in Altona (west Hamburg). She combined this with work as a lecturer at the universityHistory Faculty). In 2008 she switched to Hamburg's Albert-Schweitzer-Gymnasium (secondary school).

She combined her teaching not just with a political career but also with authorship. Her biography of Geseke Cletzen, the rich woman who (re-)endowed the St. Elisabeth Hospital (as the Hospital zum Heiligen Geist in Hamburg was initially known) back in the early fifteenth century appeared in 1996. During the twenty-first century she has published several historical novels. She has published in-depth school-level teaching notes on several topics and more recently, while he was still alive, co-authored two academic "Festschriften" honoring her former mentor Gerhard Theuerkauf.

Since 2014 Urbanski has been working with Rita Bake (and others) on the "Hamburg-Geschichtsbuch" (loosely, "Hamburg History Book") project, a multi-channel project backed by the Verein für Hamburgische Geschichte and other institutions in the city involved with history and education. She has shaped and developed the project, which she says will never be complete, (Note: "Das Hamburg-Geschichtsbuch wird aber nie „fertig“ sein. Es wächst stetig, es kommen neue Informationen, Projekte und Unterrichtsmaterialien hinzu." Dr Silke Urbanski) assembling a team of authors, and herself designing many of the "worksheets" issued as part of it. The project website went public on 6 September 2017. Practical support also comes from the university and other relevant research bodies.

=== Politics ===
Having joined the SPD in 1986, between 1997 and 2001 Urbanski served as a member of the Hamburg party's "Arts and Culture Authority" ("Kulturbehörde. "). Then in the regional elections she was elected a member of the Bürgerschaft (Hamburg Parliament) in 1997. The SPD, as was usual in Hamburg during that period, won the largest proportion of the votes and ended up with the largest number of seats, but they fell short of the 50% threshold and were obliged to govern in coalition with the Green Party. Silke Urbanski was appointed as a representative of her party to sit on two important committees: that for "Gender Equality" ("Gleichstellung der Frau") and that for "Arts and Culture" ("Kultur"). However, she served in the parliament only for a single term, till 2001.
