= Walter Dirks =

German journalist (1901–1991)

Walter Dirks (8 January 1901 in Hörde, North Rhine-Westphalia – 30 May 1991 in Wittnau, Baden-Württemberg), was a German political commentator, theologian, and journalist.

== Life and career ==
From 1923 he wrote for the literary section of the Frankfurt journal Rhein-Mainische Volkszeitung, described as 'left Catholic'. He also served as secretary to Romano Guardini (1885–1968), an Italian-born German priest and influential theologian of the twentieth century. In 1933 the journal was shut down by the new Nazi regime. Dirks was arrested, but released after the paper was confiscated.

Opposed to National Socialism, Dirks spoke in public forums to stop the Nazi rise. He favored an alliance between the Catholic Center Party (Deutsche Zentrumspartei) and the Social Democratic Party of Germany (SPD). Writing in the August 1931 issue of the journal Die Arbeit (Deutschland), he "described the Catholic reaction to Nazism as 'open warfare'."

His dissertation was to remain unfinished, due in part to its likely rejection with the Nazis in power. In it Dirks discussed the 1923 book History and Class Consciousness by Georg Lukacs. To avoid its seizure by the Gestapo during house searches, the manuscript was said to have been burned.

From 1934 he worked at the Frankfurter Zeitung, first as a music critic, then from 1938 as editor of its literary section. The government closed the newspaper in 1943, and Dirks was forbidden (Schreiberverbot) to publish any of his writing. He began work at the Catholic publisher Verlag Herder. Dirks is the author of several dozen books.

He was active in the post-war reconstruction of the city of Frankfurt. Dirks also participated in forming a new political party, the Christian Democratic Union (CDU), joining Protestants and Catholics. In a 1946 article, Eugen Kogon, Clemens Münster, and Walter Dirks advanced the vision of a Christian socialist future for a democratic Germany. The CDU, however, took another direction. From 1946 Dirks was co-editor of Die Frankfurter Hefte.

At Südwestfunk, a public radio corporation, from 1949 Dirks was a political commentator on domestic issues. During 1953–1956 he worked with Theodor Adorno at the Institut fur Sozialforschung (IfS), then home of the Frankfurt School of social criticism. From 1956 to 1967 he was manager in Cologne of public television Westdeutscher Rundfunk. He co-founded in 1966 the Bensberger Kreis, a circle of Catholic intellectuals.

Dirks, an advocate for socialism, was an opponent of nuclear weapons and rearmament. With other writers such as Eugen Kogon in Die Frankfurter Hefte, he articulated these positions. From the 1960s until the end of his life, Dirks' political orientation and point of view was in the minority among German Catholics. Gustav Heinemann the President referred to him as a moral conscience of the community.

In 1941 he married Marianne Ostertag (1913–1991), who later served on the Central Committee of German Catholics (ZdK).

== Marxism and Christianity ==
A 1947 journal piece by Dirks, "Marxismus in christlicher Sicht", acquired great influence. On the subject of Communism, it was the "decisive essay for the whole post-war German Christian thinking". Addressed were positive similarities between the prophetic passages of the young Marx and the Christian gospel of love and community. Marx was first to identify with the realities of proletarian life, which Dirks saw as an act of love. Dirks wrote of this "radical thinking out of the existence of the helpless and exploited" and of Marx's "essentially Christian act... of solidarity with the other, with the neighbor, a sacrifice".

In terms moral and spiritual Marx had described the "human relations in producing" and "the real world of power conflicts and selfish drives, without idealizing it." Marx thus widened the scope of the social justice project. As did then the Lutheran theologian Paul Tillich, Dirks saw beyond his inheritance of bourgeois idealism, looking forward. Yet, unlike Tillich who countered Communism with a 'religious socialism', Dirks understood Communism as another faith. Accordingly, he faulted Marx for an Hegelian pantheism and for confusing spirit and ideology. Despite the prophetic quality of the early Marx, Dirks did not assume that he was "the appointed bearer of an historic promise". Rather, the moral claim on the Christian was to acknowledge, to listen to, and to minister to the working class. The project was to assist the exploited "until he can solve problems better and think better than the Communist". Dirks called on Christian churches for a responsive commitment, and renewed vigor.

== The Monk and the World ==
Dirks here describes himself as a lay Catholic Christian, mentioning other like authors: Chesterton, Belloc, Bloy, Hello, and the novelist Bernanos (p. 2). He introduces his book as one intending to show what benefit comes to the secular world from the monks. The point of view taken is journalistic. He tells it "from a personal way of thinking that seeks" a pathway through secular realities to "develop a consciousness" of the unity, so that one may share in "the true entirety of the history of God" (p. 31).

How do we laity benefit from the witness of monks? They live their lives in common, under vows of poverty, obedience and chastity. To answer the question we must comprehend how this life style "deviates so astonishingly from the norm of human existence" (p. 33). In the main, Dirks offers brief narratives of the major founders of monastic institutions: St. Benedict, St. Francis, St. Dominic, and St. Ignatius. Each began in part as an answer to a historical challenge (pp. 71–73).

About St. Francis (pp. 152–181), Dirks historically situates the start of the Franciscan order when medieval societies began to transform into urban business cultures (pp. 164–167). Buying and selling became a focus in the evolving role of the merchant. Hence the laity faced novel situations. St. Francis is quoted expressing the connection between violence and property:

Sir, if we had property, we would need weapons for our protection. For from property, litigation and quarrels arise, and through these the love of God and one's neighbor is greatly diminished. And so in this world we desire no property whatever.

As Dirks sees it, the mission of St. Francis was to the wealthy. His was not a movement of the poor against the rich, although he recognized the contradiction between the hierarchy's wealth and the admonitions of Jesus. The perplexing thing (then and now) was that St. Francis preached poverty, "Lady Poverty", to the rich. To be sure, he urged the rich to give alms, yet the "threat to the rich man from his wealth caused him much greater anxiety" (p. 163). St. Francis saw that "the nature of wealth had changed. ... that riches were striking root in men's hearts in a different way. ...it had become more intimately precious" (p. 165). The merchant was put "in the slow process of learning how to separate workaday atheistic behavior from devout observance" and "under these conditions he was imperiled" (p. 166).

== Selected publications ==
- Erbe und Aufgabe, 1931
- Die Antwort der Mönche, 1952
- War ich ein linker Spinner?, 1983
- Der singende Stotterer: Autobiographische Texte, 1983
- Gesammelte Schriften, 8 volumes, 1987–1991

== Legacy ==
- The Walter Dirks Prize has been awarded to, among others, Rita Süssmuth, Rupert Neudeck, and Wolfgang Thierse.
- Walter-Dirks-Straße (1029337)

== Awards ==
- 1983: Geschwister-Scholl-Preis for War ich ein linker Spinner?
