= Mitten in Europa – Deutsche Geschichte =

- Country of origin: Germany

Mitten in Europa – Deutsche Geschichte is a German television series.

== See also ==
- List of German television series
