= Radio RaBe =

Radio RaBe 95.6

Bern, Switzerland; Switzerland
- Broadcast area: Bern Area
- Frequency: 95.6 MHz

Programming
- Affiliations: AMARC, UNIKOM

History
- First air date: March 1, 1996

Technical information
- Transmitter coordinates: 46.9579453°N 7.4433792°E
- Translators: Bantiger TV Tower, Cable, Internet

Links
- Webcast: rabe.ch/mp3_stream
- Website: rabe.ch

Radio RaBe (Bern's cultural radio), a non-commercial community radio station based in Bern, Switzerland. It is a AMARC and UNIKOM-Radios member. The station is governed as a registered association and is financed through membership dues from more than 1000 members. Radio RaBe broadcasts weekly in some 15-20 languages.

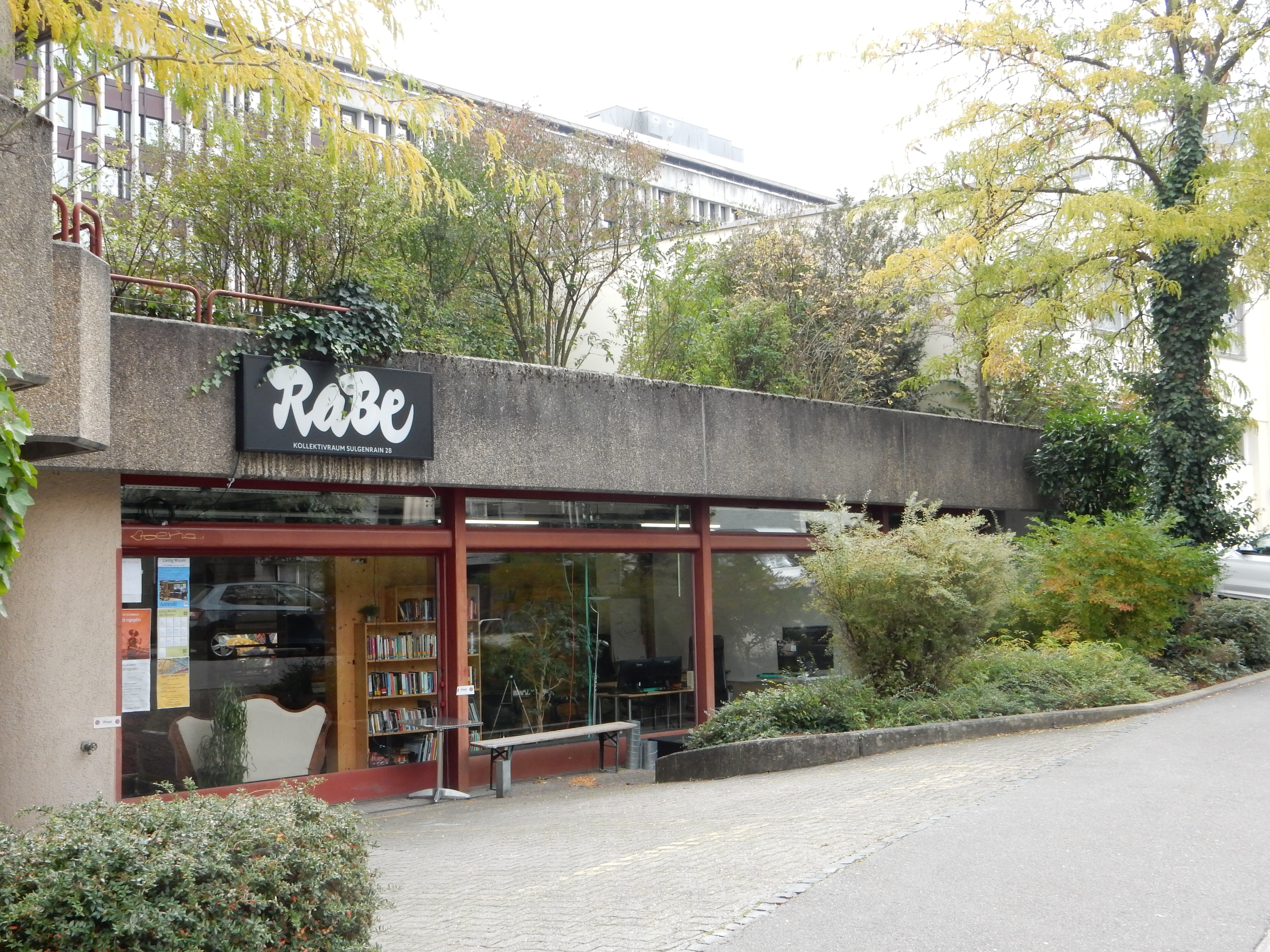
Radio RaBe (2025)

The 30+ music programs cover a wide range of musical styles: reggae, blues, world music, as well as music from nearly all European countries, such as the Balkans or Italy. RaBe provides Bern and the surrounding region with an important community resource of essential information and support for the integration of the foreign community in Bern.

On 17 June 2011 it was announced that Radio RaBe has been awarded the Cultural Prize of Canton of Bern 2011. The prize includes a cash award of 30,000 Swiss Francs.

For 29 years, broadcasts were made from Randweg 21 in Bern's Lorraine neighborhood. Due to building renovations, the station moved to Sulgenrain 28 in the Marzili neighborhood in 2025.
