= Eugen Kogon =

German historian and Nazi concentration camp survivor

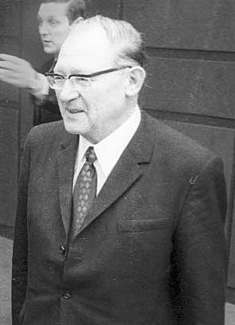
Eugen Kogon in 1970

Eugen Kogon (2 February 1903 – 24 December 1987) was a German historian and Nazi concentration camp survivor. A well-known Christian opponent of the Nazi Party, Kogon was arrested more than once and spent six years at Buchenwald concentration camp. Known in Germany as a journalist, sociologist, political scientist, author, and politician, he went on to be considered one of the "intellectual fathers" of both West Germany and European integration. His 1946 book The Theory and Practice of Hell - The German Concentration Camps and the System Behind Them still stands as a basic reference on Nazi crimes (translated 1950).

== Early years ==
Eugen Kogon was born in Munich, the son of an unmarried Russian-Jewish mother from Mykolaiv (a city then part of the Russian Empire, now in Ukraine). When he was 2 years old, she died and he was given foster parents and later attended a Catholic boarding school. He spent the larger portion of his youth in Catholic monasteries. After studying economics and sociology at the universities in Munich, Florence, and Vienna, Kogon received his doctorate in 1927 in Vienna with a dissertation on the Faschismus und Korporativstaat ("Corporate State and Fascism"). That same year, Kogon got a job as editor of the Catholic magazine Schönere Zukunft ("Brighter Future") and stayed there till 1937. Through his work, he made the acquaintance of sociologist Othmar Spann, who recommended him for the Zentralkommission der christlichen Gewerkschaften ("Central Committee of Christian Unions"). Kogon was an advisor there several years later. In 1934, after the July Putsch, Kogon took over the asset management of the House of Saxe-Coburg-Koháry for Prince Prince Philipp of Saxe-Coburg.

== Nazi resistance ==
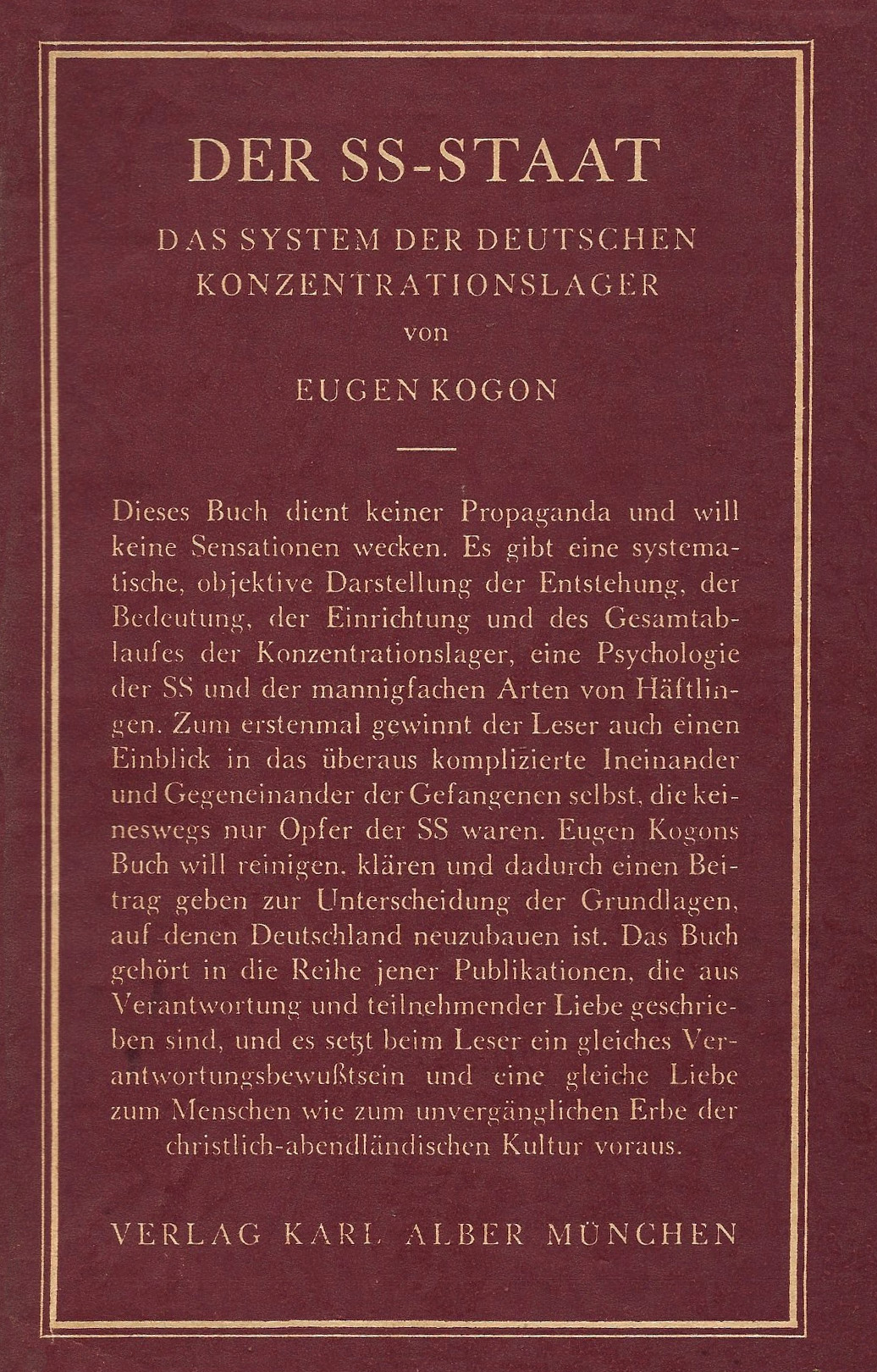
Original 1946 cover of Kogon's Der SS-Staat (1950 tr. The Theory and Practice of Hell)

An avowed opponent of Nazism, Kogon was arrested by the Gestapo in 1936 and again in March 1937, charged with, among other things, "work[ing] for anti-national socialist forces outside the territory of the Reich". In March 1938, he was arrested a third time and, in September 1939, was deported to Buchenwald concentration camp, where he spent the next six years as "prisoner number 9093".

At Buchenwald, Kogon spent part of his time working as a clerk for camp doctor Erwin Ding-Schuler, who headed up the typhus experimentation ward there. According to Kogon's own statements, he was able to develop a relationship bordering on trust with Ding-Schuler, after becoming his clerk in 1943. In time, they had conversations about family concerns, the political situation and events at the front. According to Kogon, through his influence on Ding-Schuler, he was able to save the lives of many prisoners, including Stéphane Hessel, Edward Yeo-Thomas, and Harry Peulevé by exchanging their identities with those of prisoners who had died of typhus. In early April 1945, Kogon and the head prisoner nurse in the typhus experimentation ward, Arthur Dietzsch, found out from Ding-Schuler that their names were on a list of 46 prisoners whom the SS wanted to execute shortly before the expected liberation of the camp. Ding-Schuler saved Kogon's life at the end of the war by arranging to hide him in a crate, then smuggling him out of Buchenwald to his own home in Weimar.

Right after being liberated in 1945, Kogon again began working as a journalist. He worked as a volunteer historian for the United States Army at Camp King and began writing his book Der SS-Staat: Das System der deutschen Konzentrationslager ("The SS-State: The System of the German Concentration Camps"), first published in 1946, which still stands as a basic reference on Nazi crimes. The book was translated into several languages, in English, as The Theory and Practice of Hell. The German language version alone sold 500,000 copies.

Despite this intensive involvement with the past, Kogon primarily chose to look ahead, toward building a new society—one that would blend with Kogon's convictions of Christianity and socialism. Kogon had already spoken about his ideas in Buchenwald with fellow prisoner Kurt Schumacher. However, the rapid growth of the Social Democratic Party hindered the proposed alliance of right-wing social democrats and the Centre Party into a "Labour Party" after the British model.

== Journalism ==
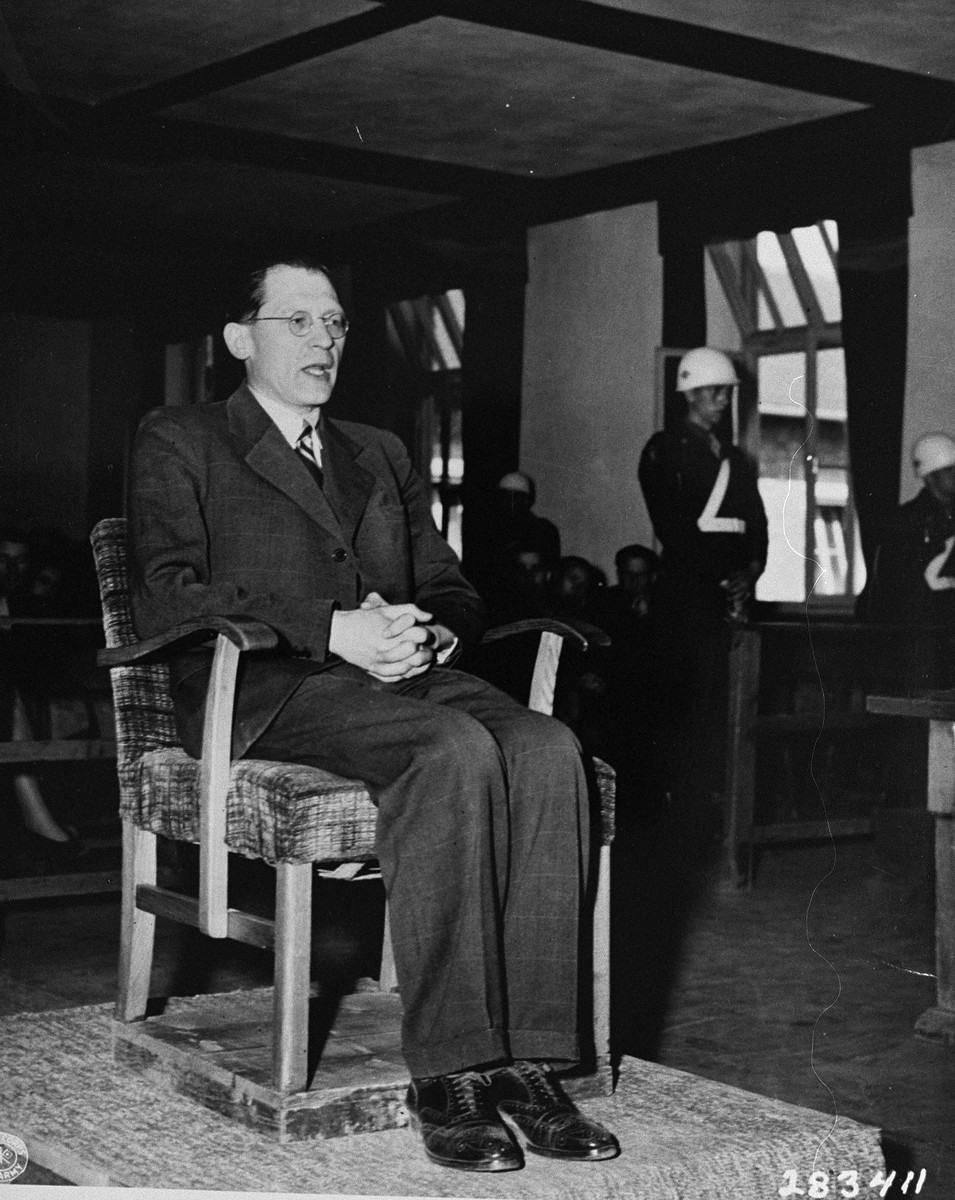
Kogon giving his eyewitness testimony on 16 April 1947 at the Buchenwald trial (part of the Dachau trials)

In September 1945, Kogon and other journalists, among them Walter Dirks, later his friend and companion, published the Frankfurter Leitsätze ("Frankfurt Guiding Principles"). In this Program of the Volkspartei ("popular party"), they called for an "economic socialism on a democratic basis", laying out an important basis for the Christian-socialist founding program of the Hessian Christian Democratic Union (CDU), also for the Constitution of Hesse, which was finalized at the end of 1946 and provided for the nationalization of key industries.

In 1946, Kogon and Dirks founded the Frankfurter Hefte ("Frankfurt Notebooks"), a cultural and political magazine with a left-wing Catholic point of view. They quickly reached a circulation of 75,000, which was very high for that time and, until 1984, remained one of the most influential socio-political and cultural magazines in the postwar era. In the Gesellschaft Imshausen, Kogon was involved in the search for a "third way" in the renewal of Germany. He quickly turned away from Konrad Adenauer's CDU, which was not interested in communal ownership and nationalization of key industries. Kogon instead wrote many essays taking a critical look at the Adenauer government. Among other issues, he turned against the Wiederbewaffnung, atomic weapons and the "madness of excessive armament".

== European politician ==
As a lesson from Nazism, Kogon early called for departure from a traditional nation-state and fought for the establishment of a European Republic. Among others, he was involved in the Union of European Federalists (UEF) and the German section of the UEF, where he served as the first President from 1949 to 1954. From 1951 to 1953, Kogon was also president of the German council of the European Movement.

Alfred Grosser counted him as one of the three "creators of Europe".

== Later years ==
In 1951, the Technische Hochschule Darmstadt established the first chair of scientific policy in Germany. The first chair holder was Kogon. He co-founded political science as a field of study in Germany. He was teaching there till his retirement in 1968, whereupon he was made professor emeritus. University president Johann-Dietrich Wörner later attested to Kogon's importance, saying, "He shaped the moral conscience of the university to the present day.". From January 1964 to January 1965, Kogon headed the political magazine Panorama, broadcast by the German station ARD. He began serving as the program's moderator in March 1964.

Later, Kogon supported the Eastern policy of the Social-Liberal coalition and actively promoted reconciliation with Poland and the Soviet Union. The state of Hesse honored Kogon in 1982 with the newly created Hessian Culture Prize. His final years were spent in quiet retirement Königstein im Taunus, where there is now a street named for him. In 2002, the city began awarding an annual "Eugen Kogon Prize for Democracy in Action". The first winner was the former Polish Foreign Minister Wladyslaw Bartoszewski.

== Bibliography ==
- Der SS-Staat. Das System der deutschen Konzentrationslager, Karl Alber, Munich (1946). 44. Auflage: Heyne, Munich (2006) ISBN 978-3-453-02978-1
- Gesammelte Schriften in 8 Bänden. Beltz, Weinheim 1995–1999.
  - 1. Ideologie und Praxis der Unmenschlichkeit (1995) ISBN 3-88679-261-7
  - 2. Europäische Visionen (1995) ISBN 3-88679-262-5
  - 3. Die restaurative Republik (1996) ISBN 3-88679-263-3
  - 4. Liebe und tu was du willst (1996) ISBN 3-88679-264-1
  - 5. Die reformierte Gesellschaft (1997) ISBN 3-88679-265-X
  - 6. Dieses merkwürdige wichtige Leben (1997, ISBN 3-88679-266-8
  - 7. Bedingungen der Humanität (1998) ISBN 3-88679-267-6
  - 8. Die Idee des christlichen Ständestaats (1999) ISBN 3-88679-268-4

=== Works as co-editor ===
- Kurt Fassmann with contributions by Max Bill, Hoimar von Ditfurth and others (Editors), Die Großen: Leben und Leistung der sechshundert bedeutendsten Persönlichkeiten unserer Welt. Kindler Verlag, Zurich (1977)
- Eugen Kogon, Hermann Langbein, Adalbert Rückerl and others (Editors), Nationalsozialistische Massentötungen durch Giftgas. Fischer-Verlag, Frankfurt am Main (1986) ISBN 3-596-24353-X

=== Works in English ===
- The Theory and Practice of Hell - The German Concentration Camps and the System Behind Them, New York: Farrar, Straus and Cudahy (1950), 307 p. translated by Heinz Norden from Der SS Staat [sic]
  - The Theory and Practice of Hell, New York: Berkley Books (1998), 333 p. ISBN 0-425-16431-4

== See also ==
- Alfred Balachowsky
- Phil Lamason
- Liberation theology

== Sources ==
- Hubert Habicht (Editor), Eugen Kogon – ein politischer Publizist in Hessen. Essays, Aufsätze und Reden zwischen 1946 und 1982. Insel Verlag, Frankfurt am Main (1982) ISBN 3-458-14046-8 (in German)
- Karl Prümm, Walter Dirks und Eugen Kogon als katholische Publizisten der Weimarer Republik. Catholic Press, Heidelberg (1984) ISBN 3-533-03549-2 (in German)
- Jürgen Mittag, Vom Honoratiorenkreis zum Europanetzwerk: Sechs Jahrzehnte Europäische Bewegung Deutschland in 60 Jahre Europäische Bewegung Deutschland. Berlin (2009) pp. 12–28 (in German)
