= Carsten Diercks =

German documentary filmmaker

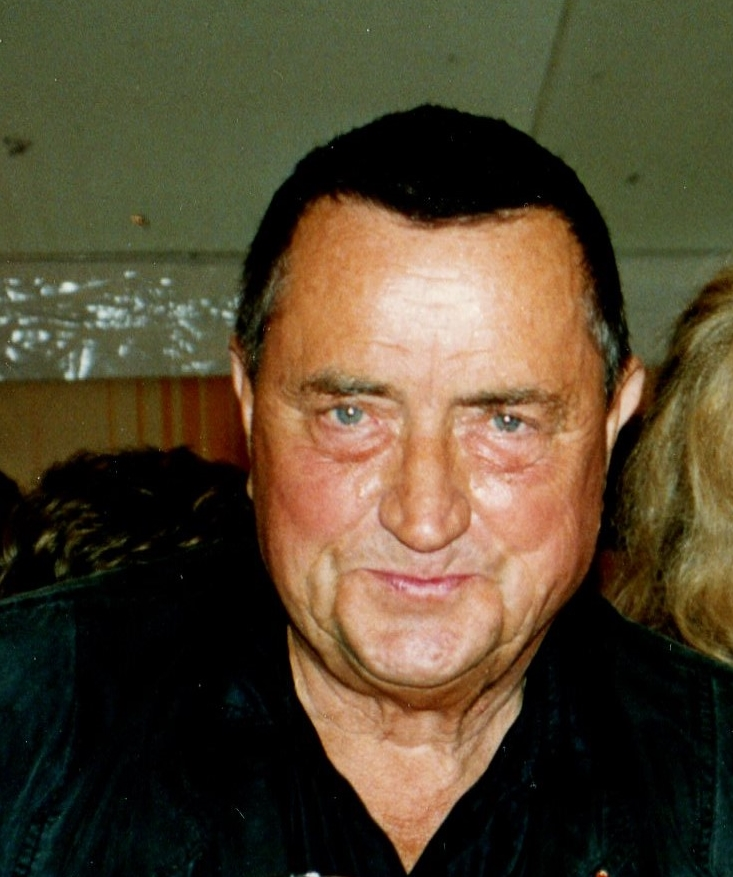
Carsten Diercks

Carsten Diercks (1921 – 2 November 2009) was a German documentary filmmaker.

Diercks started his career after World War II at the radio station of the Nordwestdeutscher Rundfunk. 1952 he became cinematographer with NWDR TV station. In 1953, he participated in the first tests of pilot tone. During his long occupation for the network, he made some 500 documentaries as cinematographer, director or executive producer. He was the driving representative of the so-called Hamburgian school, which aimed to comply the documentary genre with new requirements of television broadcasting.

In 1959, he worked as a consultant for Minister of Information and Broadcasting Indira Gandhi to build up a national TV network in India He was decorated with the Bundesverdienstkreuz.

== Filmography ==
- 1955: Netz über Bord - Heringsfang auf der Nordsee
