= Prix Iris for Best First Film =

Annual Canadian film award

The Prix Iris for Best First Film (French: Prix Iris du meilleur premier film) is an annual film award, presented by Québec Cinéma as part of its Prix Iris awards program, to honour the year's best debut film made within the Cinema of Quebec.

The award was presented for the first time at the 21st Quebec Cinema Awards as a special award to the director and producers. Starting at the 22nd Quebec Cinema Awards in 2020, the category became competitive, with the award being given to the directors and sometime screenwriters of the nominated films.

Many films nominated for this award also received notable nominations in other categories:

- For Those Who Don't Read Me (À tous ceux qui ne me lisent pas) received eleven other nominations, including Best Film.
- The Decline (Jusqu'au déclin) received seven other nominations, including the Public Prize.
- Felix and the Treasure of Morgäa (Félix et le trésor de Morgäa) received a nomination for Most Successful Film Outside Quebec at the 2022 ceremony.
- Without Havana (Sin la Habana) received six additional nominations, including Best Film.
- Beans received ten additional nominations, including Best Film.
- Bootlegger received seven additional nominations, winning Most Successful Film Outside Quebec.
- Falcon Lake received five additional nominations, winning Most Successful Film Outside Quebec.
- Noemie Says Yes (Noémie dit oui) received three additional nominations, including Best Film.
- My Mother's Men (Les hommes de ma mère) received two additional nominations, winning the Public Prize.
- Humanist Vampire Seeking Consenting Suicidal Person (Vampire humaniste cherche suicidaire consentant) received twenty-one additional nominations, winning Best Film.
- Richelieu received nine additional nominations, including Best Film.

== 2010s ==
Year	Film	Filmmakers	Ref
2019; 21st Quebec Cinema Awards
2019; 21st Quebec Cinema Awards	For Those Who Don't Read Me (À tous ceux qui ne me lisent pas)	Yan Giroux, Luc Déry, Élaine Hébert, Kim McCraw	

== 2020s ==
Year	Film	Filmmakers	Ref
2020; 22nd Quebec Cinema Awards
2020; 22nd Quebec Cinema Awards	Sympathy for the Devil (Sympathie pour le diable)	Guillaume de Fontenay, Guillaume Vigneault	
2020; 22nd Quebec Cinema Awards	Mad Dog Labine	Jonathan Beaulieu-Cyr, Renaud Lessard	
2020; 22nd Quebec Cinema Awards	The Twentieth Century	Matthew Rankin	
2021; 23rd Quebec Cinema Awards
2021; 23rd Quebec Cinema Awards	Vacarme	Neegan Trudel, Jonathan Lemire	
2021; 23rd Quebec Cinema Awards	Felix and the Treasure of Morgäa (Félix et le trésor de Morgäa)	Nicola Lemay	
2021; 23rd Quebec Cinema Awards	The Decline (Jusqu'au déclin)	Patrice Laliberté, Charles Dionne, Nicolas Krief	
2022; 24th Quebec Cinema Awards
2022; 24th Quebec Cinema Awards	Without Havana (Sin la Habana)	Kaveh Nabatian	
2022; 24th Quebec Cinema Awards	Beans	Tracey Deer, Meredith Vuchnich	
2022; 24th Quebec Cinema Awards	Bootlegger	Caroline Monnet, Daniel Watchorn	
2023; 25th Quebec Cinema Awards
2023; 25th Quebec Cinema Awards	Falcon Lake	Charlotte Le Bon	
2023; 25th Quebec Cinema Awards	Farador	Édouard Albernhe Tremblay	
2023; 25th Quebec Cinema Awards	My Mother's Men (Les hommes de ma mère)	Anik Jean	
2023; 25th Quebec Cinema Awards	Noemie Says Yes (Noémie dit oui)	Geneviève Albert	
2023; 25th Quebec Cinema Awards	Rodeo (Rodéo)	Joëlle Desjardins Paquette	
2024; 26th Quebec Cinema Awards
2024; 26th Quebec Cinema Awards	Humanist Vampire Seeking Consenting Suicidal Person (Vampire humaniste cherche suicidaire consentant)	Ariane Louis-Seize, Christine Doyon	
2024; 26th Quebec Cinema Awards	Hunting Daze (Jour de chasse)	Annick Blanc	
2024; 26th Quebec Cinema Awards	Kanaval	Henri Pardo	
2024; 26th Quebec Cinema Awards	Richelieu	Pier-Philippe Chevigny	
2024; 26th Quebec Cinema Awards	When Adam Changes (Adam change lentement)	Joël Vaudreuil	
2025; 27th Quebec Cinema Awards
2025; 27th Quebec Cinema Awards	Vile & Miserable (Vil & Misérable)	Jean-François Leblanc, Samuel Cantin	
2025; 27th Quebec Cinema Awards	A Christmas Storm (Le Cyclone de Noël)	Alain Chicoine	
2025; 27th Quebec Cinema Awards	The Last Meal (Le Dernier repas)	Maryse Legagneur, Luis Molinié	
2025; 27th Quebec Cinema Awards	Who Do I Belong To (Là d'où l'on vient)	Meryam Joobeur	
2025; 27th Quebec Cinema Awards	You Are Not Alone (Vous n'êtes pas seuls)	Marie-Hélène Viens, Philippe Lupien	

== See also ==
- John Dunning Best First Feature Award
- Toronto International Film Festival Award for Best Canadian First Feature Film
