= Kaveh Nabatian =

Iranian-Canadian musician and film director

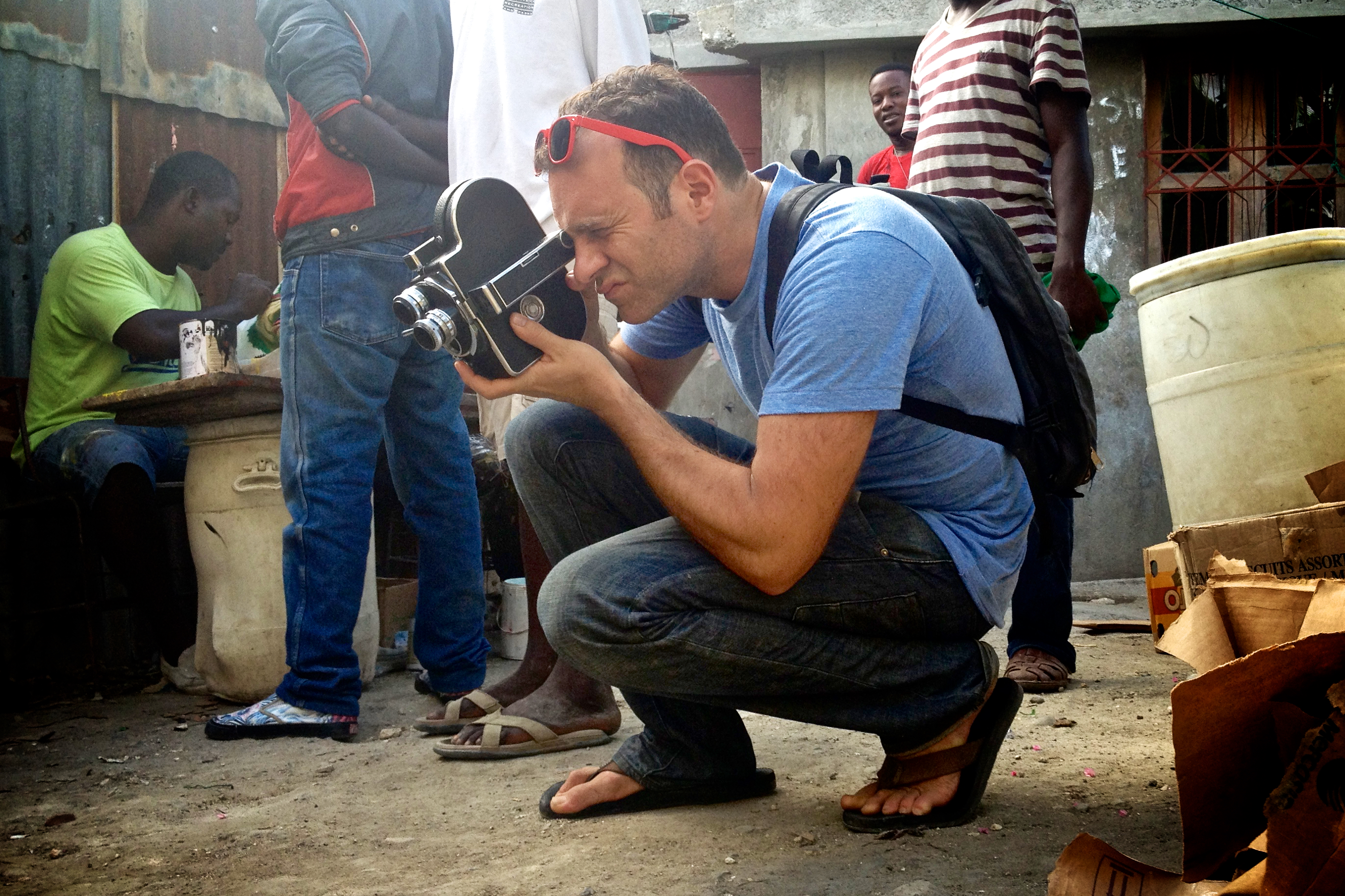
- Born: Montréal, Quebec, Canada
- Occupations: Director; writer; producer; composer; cinematographer

Kaveh Nabatian is an Iranian-Canadian musician and film director, known as a trumpeter and keyboardist with the Juno Award winning orchestral post-rock band Bell Orchestre.

== Career ==
As a filmmaker, Nabatian was first noted for his 2010 short film Vapor, about an older Mexican man who comes to terms with homosexuality. The film was a Genie Award nominee for Best Live Action Short Drama at the 31st Genie Awards, and a Prix Jutra nominee for Best Short Film at the 13th Jutra Awards, as well as one of TIFF’s Canada's Top Ten films for the year.

In 2017, Nabatian directed Leonard Cohen: A Crack in Everything, a documentary on Leonard Cohen which was broadcast by both CBC Television in English and Ici Radio-Canada Télé in French. In 2019, he was the lead director, alongside Sophie Goyette, Juan Andrés Arango, Sophie Deraspe, Karl Lemieux, Ariane Lorrain and Caroline Monnet, of the experimental anthology film, The Seven Last Words (Les sept dernières paroles), set to the music of Joseph Haydn’s The Seven Last Words of Our Saviour on the Cross, Op. 51. It premiered at the International Film Festival Rotterdam.

Nabatian's debut feature film, Sin La Habana, about an Afro-Cuban ballet dancer who seduces an Iranian Jewish woman in order to escape Cuba, premiered at the Festival du nouveau cinéma in 2020 before being commercially released in 2021. The film stars Yonah Acosta and was written in collaboration with Cuban hip hop producer Pablo Herrera. He received Canadian Screen Award nominations for the John Dunning Best First Feature Award and Best Original Screenplay at the 10th Canadian Screen Awards in 2022 for Sin La Habana. He won the Prix Iris for Best First Film and was nominated for Best Director and Best Original Screenplay at the Gala Québec Cinéma in 2022.

Nabatian’s feature documentary Kite Zo A: Leave the Bones, a sensorial exploration of Haitian rituals, premiered at the Festival du Nouveau Cinéma in 2022, where it won the Prix pour la Paix Audience Award. It had its international premiere at South by Southwest in 2023 before going into commercial release. He won the Best Cinematography in a Documentary and was nominated for Best Feature Length Documentary at the 12th Canadian Screen Awards in 2024.

He has also directed music videos for artists including Aurora, Bell Orchestre, Leif Vollebekk, The Barr Brothers, Sarah Neufeld, Little Scream, Lakou Mizik & Joseph Ray and Half Moon Run.

Kaveh Nabatian won the award for Best Cinematography in a Feature Length Documentary at the 2024 Canadian Screen Awards for his work on Kite Zo A: Leave the Bones.

== Filmography ==
Year	Title	Contribution	Note
2004	My Brand New Life	Director, cinematographer	TV series
2008	Facteur humain	Director, cinematographer	TV series
2008	Sunday Afternoon	Writer, director, composer	Short film
2010	Taxi Libre	Writer, director	Short film
2010	Vapor	Writer, director	Short film
2011	St-Henri, The 26th of August (À St-Henri, le 26 août)	Segment director, cinematographer	Documentary feature
2013	Dive	Writer, director, composer	Short film
2014	Nan Lakou Kanaval	Director, cinematographer, producer	Documentary short
2015	Holika	Director, cinematographer, producer	Documentary short
2017	Leonard Cohen: A Crack in Everything	Writer, director, producer	Documentary
2019	The Seven Last Words (Les sept dernières paroles)	Writer, segment director	Feature film
2020	Without Havana (Sin la Habana)	Writer, director, composer	Feature film
2022	Kite Zo A: Leave the Bones	Director, cinematographer, Producer	Documentary

== Discography ==
=== Bell Orchestre ===
- Recording a Tape the Colour of the Light (2005)
- Who Designs Nature's How (2009)
- As Seen Through Windows (2009)
- House Music (2021)

== Awards and nominations ==
Year	Award	Category	Work	Result	Ref.
2009	Gémeaux Awards	Multiculture Award	My Brand New Life	Won	
2011	Directors Guild of Canada	Best Short Film	Taxi Libre	Won	
2011	Genie Awards	Best Live Action Short Drama	Vapor	Nominated	
2011	Prix Iris	Best Short	Vapor	Nominated	
2011	Toronto International Film Festival	RBC Emerging Filmmaker	Saturday Night	Nominated	
2020	Festival du nouveau cinéma	Prix de la diffusion Quebecor	Without Havana	Won	
2021	Directors Guild of Canada	DGC Discovery Award	Without Havana	Nominated	
2021	Miami International Film Festival	Jordan Ressler First Feature Award	Without Havana	Nominated	
2021	Les Percéides	Grand Prix du Jury	Without Havana	Won	
2021	Reelworld Film Festival	Standout Director	Without Havana	Won	
2021	Reelworld Film Festival	Standout Writer	Without Havana	Won	
2021	Vancouver International Film Festival	Best Canadian Feature Film	Without Havana	Won	
