= 2025 Festival du nouveau cinéma =

Independent film festival in Canada

- Official poster
- Opening film: Space Cadet by Eric San
- Closing film: The Train (Le Train) by Marie Brassard
- Location: Montreal, Quebec, Canada
- Founded: 1971
- Festival date: October 8-19, 2025
- Website: nouveaucinema.ca/en

Festival du nouveau cinéma
- 2026 2024

The 2025 edition of the Festival du nouveau cinéma, the 54th edition in the event's history, took place from October 8 to 19, 2025, in Montreal, Quebec, Canada.

== Juries ==
- National Competition, Feature Films: Núria Palenzuela Camon, Jing Xu, Ewa Szabłowska.
- International Competition, Feature Films: Guillaume Vasseur, Maxim Gaudette, Naomie Décarie-Daigneault.
- National Competition, Short Films: Adam Piron, Vincent Förster, Louise Martin Papasian.
- International Competition, Short Films: Alison McAlpine, Joël Vaudreuil, Vlad Alexis.
- New Alchemists: OK Pedersen, Vincent Toi.
- New Alchemists, Short Films: Louis-Jean Decazes, Pascal Grenier, Alain P. Jacques.
- Fierté Montréal Prize: Florence Blain Mbaye, Jérémie Battaglia, Chris Ngabonziza.
- RPCÉ: Justine Martin, Paul Landriau, Alex Moussa Sawadogo.
- FIPRESCI: David Voigt, Luciana Rodriguez Diaz, Călin Boto.

== Awards ==
The following awards were presented:

Award	Film	Recipient(s)
International Competition, Louve d'Or for Best Feature Film	I Only Rest in the Storm	Pedro Pinho
International Competition, Best Performance Award	A Poet	Ubeimar Rios
International Competition, Daniel Langlois Innovation Award	Affection Affection	Maxime Matray, Alexia Walther
National Competition, Grand Prix for Best Feature Film	Blue Heron	Sophy Romvari
National Competition, Special Mention for Best Feature Film	My Son Came Back to Disappear	Yan Giroux
New Alchemists, Best Feature Film	Mare's Nest	Ben Rivers
New Alchemists, Special Mention for Best Feature Film	Zodiac Killer Project	Charlie Shackleton
Fierté Montréal Award	A Useful Ghost	Ratchapoom Boonbunchachoke
FIPRESCI Award for Best First Feature Film	The Devil Smokes (and Saves the Burnt Matches in the Same Box)	Ernesto Martínez Bucio
Temps Ø Audience Award	Mag Mag	Yuriyan Retriever
International Panorama, Audience Award	Put Your Soul on Your Hand and Walk	Sepideh Farsi
International Competition, Loup Argenté for Best Short Film	Extracurricular Activity	Dean Wei, Xu Yidan
National Competition, Grand Prize for Best Short Film	Picnic	Jérémy Gagnon
National Competition, Special Mention for Best Short Film	ripe (chín)	Solara Thanh Bình Đặng
National Competition, People's Choice Award for Best Short Film	Land of Cold	Hervé Demers
New Alchemists, Dada International Prize for Best Short Film	Daria's Night Flowers	Maryam Tafakory
New Alchemists, Dada National Prize for Best Short Film	Felt	Blake Williams
New Alchemists, Best Animated Short Film	Their Eyes	Nicolas Gourault
RPCÉ, Grand Prize for Best Short Film	Sydney	Grant Earl MacIntosh
RPCÉ, Jeune Loup Prize for Best Short Film	In My Child's Mind	Marie-Sophie Gagné, Charles Bergeron
RPCÉ, Vidéographe Coup de Coeur Prize	Lullaby for a Deathdream	Charlie Galea McClure
P'tits Loups, People's Choice Award for Best Short Film	Cardboard	J.P. Vine

== Official selections ==
The first programming announcements were issued on August 7. The festival opened with Kid Koala's animated film Space Cadet, and closed with Marie Brassard's film The Train (Le Train).

The short film competition programs were announced on September 16, and the full program lineup was announced on September 23.

The festival also staged a special memorial tribute to filmmaker David Lynch following his death in January 2025, screening the entire first season of his television series Twin Peaks in a special Lynch-themed event at the Université du Québec à Montréal.

=== International Competition ===
English title	Original title	Director(s)	Production country
Affection Affection		Maxime Matray, Alexia Walther	France
Bedrock		Kinga Michalska	Canada
The Devil Smokes (and Saves the Burnt Matches in the Same Box)	El diablo fuma (y guarda las cabezas de los cerillos quemados en la misma caja)	Ernesto Martínez Bucio	Mexico
Her Will Be Done	Que ma volonté soit faite	Julia Kowalski	France, Poland
I Only Rest in the Storm	O Riso e a Faca	Pedro Pinho	Portugal, Brazil, France, Romania
Left-Handed Girl	左撇子女孩	Shih-Ching Tsou	Taiwan, France, United States, United Kingdom
A Poet	Un poeta	Simón Mesa Soto	Colombia
Rijeka or Death!	Fiume o morte!	Igor Bezinović	Croatia, Italy, Slovenia
Two Times João Liberada	Duas vezes João Liberada	Paula Tomás Marques	Portugal
A Useful Ghost	ผีใช้ได้ค่ะ	Ratchapoom Boonbunchachoke	Thailand, France, Singapore, Germany

=== National Competition ===
English title	Original title	Director(s)	Production country
100 Sunset		Kunsang Kyirong	Canada
Barbaracadabra		Renaud Lessard, Barbara Ulrich	Canada
Blue Heron		Sophy Romvari	Canada
Dead Lover		Grace Glowicki	Canada
Elsewhere at Night	Ailleurs la nuit	Marianne Métivier	Canada
My Son Came Back to Disappear	Mon fils ne revint que sept jours	Yan Giroux	Canada
Shifting Baselines		Julien Élie	Canada
Vanishing Points	Puntos de fuga	Lina Rodriguez	Canada

=== International Panorama ===
English title	Original title	Director(s)	Production country
L'aventura		Sophie Letourneur	France
A Balcony in Limoges	Un balcon à Limoges	Jérôme Reybaud	France
The Blue Trail	O Último Azul	Gabriel Mascaro	Brazil, Mexico, Chile, Netherlands
The Last One for the Road	Le città di pianura	Francesco Sossai	Italy, Germany
Little Trouble Girls	Kaj ti je deklica	Urška Djukić	Slovenia, Italy, Croatia, Serbia
The Mysterious Gaze of the Flamingo	La misteriosa mirada del flamenco	Diego Céspedes	Chile, France
Once Upon a Time in Gaza		Tarzan and Arab Nasser	Palestine, France, Portugal
Pillion		Harry Lighton	United Kingdom
Promised Sky	Promis le ciel	Erige Sehiri	Tunisia, France, Netherlands, Qatar
Put Your Soul on Your Hand and Walk		Sepideh Farsi	France, Palestine, Iran
Tell Her That I Love Her	Dites-lui que je l'aime	Romane Bohringer	France
The Things You Kill		Alireza Khatami	Canada, France, Poland, Turkey
The Visitor	Svečias	Vytautas Katkus	Lithuania, Norway, Sweden

=== The New Alchemists (Les Nouveaux alchimistes) ===
English title	Original title	Director(s)	Production country
Ariel		Lois Patiño	Spain, Portugal
Dandelion's Odyssey	Planètes	Momoko Seto	France, Belgium
Desire Lines	Linije ẑelje	Dane Komljen	Serbia, Bosnia and Herzegovina, Netherlands, Croatia, Germany
Hair, Paper, Water...	Tóc, giấy và nước...	Nicolas Graux, Trương Minh Quý	Belgium, France, Vietnam
Levers		Rhayne Vermette	Canada
Mare's Nest		Ben Rivers	United Kingdom, Canada, France
Punku		Juan Daniel Fernández Molero	Peru, Spain
The Tree of Authenticity	L'arbre de l'authenticité	Sammy Baloji	Belgium, Democratic Republic of the Congo, France
Who Witnessed the Temples Fall	Quién vio los templos caer	Lucia Selva	Spain
Zodiac Killer Project		Charlie Shackleton	United Kingdom, United States

=== The Essentials (Les Incontournables) ===
English title	Original title	Director(s)	Production country
Blue Moon		Richard Linklater	United States, Ireland
The Disappearance of Josef Mengele	Das Verschwinden des Josef Mengele	Kirill Serebrennikov	France, Germany, Spain, United Kingdom
Dracula		Radu Jude	Romania, Austria, Luxembourg, Brazil
Father Mother Sister Brother		Jim Jarmusch	United States, Ireland, France
Frankenstein		Guillermo del Toro	United States
La grazia		Paolo Sorrentino	Italy
The Ice Tower	La tour de glace	Lucile Hadžihalilović	France, Germany, Italy
Jay Kelly		Noah Baumbach	United Kingdom, United States
Kontinental '25		Radu Jude	Romania, Brazil, Switzerland, United Kingdom, Luxembourg
Little Amélie or the Character of Rain	Amélie et la métaphysique des tubes	Maïlys Vallade, Liane-Cho Han	France
Little Boy		James Benning	United States
The Love That Remains	Ástin Sem Eftir Er	Hlynur Pálmason	Iceland, Denmark, Sweden, France
Magellan	Magalhães	Lav Diaz	Portugal, Spain, Philippines, Taiwan
The Mastermind		Kelly Reichardt	United States
Miroirs No. 3		Christian Petzold	Germany
Nouvelle Vague		Richard Linklater	France
Paleontology Lesson		Sergei Loznitsa	Netherlands
Romería		Carla Simón	Spain, Belgium, Germany
Sentimental Value	Affeksjonsverdi	Joachim Trier	Norway, France, Denmark, Germany, Sweden, United Kingdom
Sound of Falling	In Die Sonne Schauen	Mascha Schilinski	Germany
To the Victory!		Valentyn Vasyanovych	Ukraine, Lithuania
Two Prosecutors	Два прокурора	Sergei Loznitsa	France, Germany, Netherlands, Latvia, Romania, Lithuania
What Does That Nature Say to You	Geu jayeoni nege mworago hani	Hong Sang-soo	South Korea
Wrong Husband	Uiksaringitara	Zacharias Kunuk	Canada

=== Temps 0 ===
English title	Original title	Director(s)	Production country
Chiliheads	Chiliheads, fous de piment fort	Julien Fréchette	Canada
The Curse		Kenichi Ugana	Japan
Dammen		Grégoire Graesslin	France
Dead Man's Boots	Prosper	Yohann Gloaguen	France
Decorado		Alberto Vázquez	Spain
The Dimensionaires: Prelude to Abraxas		Pat Tremblay	Canada
Écothérapie: Journal d'un cataclysme		Cédric Chabuel	Canada
Finding Planet Porno: The Wild Journey of American Cinema's First Outlaw		Christian Genzel	Austria
Full Metal Kebab		Martin Jauvat	France
Incomplete Chairs		Kenichi Ugana	Japan
The Incredible Snow Woman	L’ Incroyable femme des neiges	Sébastien Betbeder	France
It Follows		David Robert Mitchell	United States
Lunatic: The Luna Vachon Story		Kate Kroll	Canada
Mag Mag	禍禍女	Yuriyan Retriever	Japan
Overnight Bag	Baise-en-ville	Martin Jauvat	France
The Piano Accident	L'Accident de piano	Quentin Dupieux	France
Stronger Than the Devil	Plus forts que le diable	Graham Guit	Belgium, France
Summer Hit Machine		Jérôme Vandewattyne	Belgium
The Theatre of Horrors		David Gregory	United States
V.Maria		Daisuke Miyazaki	Japan

=== Special Presentations ===
English title	Original title	Director(s)	Production country
Flow	Straume	Gints Zilbalodis	Latvia, France, Belgium
Ghosts of the Sea	Les enfants du large	Virginia Tangvald	Canada, France
Montreal, My Beautiful	Montréal, ma belle	Xiaodan He	Canada
Ô rage électrique!		Carl Brubacher	Canada
Tampopo		Juzo Itami	Japan
Twin Peaks, Season 1		David Lynch	United States
Twin Peaks: Fire Walk With Me		David Lynch	United States
Wake Up Dead Man		Rian Johnson	United States
Who Killed the Montreal Expos?	Qui a tué les Expos de Montréal ?	Jean-François Poisson	Canada
You Are Not Alone	Vous n'êtes pas seuls	Marie-Hélène Viens, Philippe Lupien	Canada

=== History of Cinema (Histoire(s) du cinéma) ===
English title	Original title	Director(s)	Production country
The Cat in the Bag	Le chat dans le sac	Gilles Groulx	Canada
Don't Let It Kill You	Il ne faut pas mourir pour ça	Jean Pierre Lefebvre	Canada
The Element of Crime	Forbrydelsens element	Lars von Trier	Denmark
I Know Catherine, the Log Lady		Richard Green	United States
Kwaidan		Masaki Kobayashi	Japan
Looking for Alexander	Mémoires affectives	Francis Leclerc	Canada
Ms .45		Abel Ferrara	United States
My Eye	Mon œil	Jean Pierre Lefebvre	Canada
My Friend Pierrette	Mon amie Pierrette	Jean Pierre Lefebvre	Canada
Q-Bec My Love	Un succès commercial, ou Q-bec My Love	Jean Pierre Lefebvre	Canada
Resurrection	Kuángyě Shídài	Bi Gan	China, France
Sholay		Ramesh Sippy	India
Spike of Bensonhurst		Paul Morrissey	United States
Videoheaven		Alex Ross Perry	United States

=== International Competition for Short Films ===
English title	Original title	Director(s)	Production country
+10K		Gala Hernández López	France, Spain
Ali		Adnan Al Rajeev	Bangladesh, Philippines
Bad Ideas		Jan Bujnowski	Poland
Before the Sea Forgets		Ngoc Duy Le	Singapore
Cœur bleu		Samuel Suffren	Haiti, France
Common Pear		Gregor Božič	Slovenia, United Kingdom
The Contestant		Patrick Bresnan	United States
Durian, Durian		Nelson Yeo	Singapore
Erogenesis		Xandra Popescu	Germany, Romania
Extracurricular Activity		Dean Wei, Xu Yidan	China
Hyena	Altay	Ulan Yang	United States, China
I'm Glad You're Dead Now		Tawfeek Barhom	France, Greece, Palestine
Loynes		Dorian Jespers	Belgium, France, United Kingdom, Macedonia
A Night in the Mountains	Una noche en la montaña escuché una luz rugir	Andrés Jiménez Quintero	Colombia
Ponay (or You Are Not Fucking Welcome)		Hesome Chemamah	Thailand
Samba Infinito		Leonardo Martinelli	Brazil
La Sangre		Joaquín León	Spain
A Small Fiction of My Mother in Beijing		Dorothea Sing Zhang	China
A Soil a Culture a River a People		Viv Li	Germany, Belgium, China
A South-Facing Window	Une fenêtre plein sud	Lkhagvadulam Purev-Ochir	France, Mongolia
Unavailable		Kyrylo Zemlyanyi	Ukraine, France, Netherlands, Belgium, Bulgaria
A Very Straight Neck		Neo Sora	Japan, China
Wonderwall		Róisín Burns	France, United Kingdom
Yo Yo		Mohammadreza Mayghani	Iran, France

=== National Competition for Short Films ===
English title	Original title	Director(s)	Province
Adventure FM	Aventure FM	Martin C. Pariseau	Quebec
Ambush	Kameen	Yassmina Karajah	Ontario
Among the Pines	Dans les pins	Shelagh Rowan-Legg	Quebec
As Long as We Are Immortal	Tant que nous sommes immortels	Nora Burlet Dhainaut	Quebec
Boa		Alexandre Dostie	Quebec
Brief Somebodies		Andy Reid	Ontario
Land of Cold	En pays froid	Hervé Demers	Quebec
Good Guy		Julia Hendrickson	Ontario
Hooked		Natacha Bianchet	Quebec
How's Archie?		Jessie Posthumus	Ontario
Kilómetro 126		Felipe López Gómez	Ontario
A Kin Sin		Gulzar	Ontario
Klee		Gavin Baird	Saskatchewan
Make Money, Find Meaning, Don't Panic	Comment devenir riche, épanoui et détendu	Amélie Hardy	Quebec
Nous sans toi		Clara Prévost	Quebec
The Palace		Lauren Marsden	British Columbia
Paradise Heights		Karl Kai, Robert Mentov	Ontario
Passé disparu		Anna-Maria Dutoit	Quebec
Picnic	Pique-nique	Jérémy Gagnon	Quebec
La Retaguardia		Olivier Côté, Jean-François Bouchard	Quebec
ripe	chín	Solara Thanh Bình Đặng	British Columbia
A Soft Touch		Heather Young	Nova Scotia
Solitudes		Ryan McKenna	Quebec
Texas Switch		Darren Dominique Heroux	British Columbia
The Trial		Luvleen Hunjan	Ontario

=== Special Presentations Short Films ===
==== Wapikoni Mobile ====
Short films by indigenous directors associated with the Wapikoni Mobile film training program.

English title	Original title	Director(s)	Country
Children of Earth	Awaskinawason	Antony Dubé	Canada
Fleur	Wapikoni	Élisa Moar	Canada
In the Woods	Dans les bois	Mélina Quitich-Niquay	Canada
Ma connexion		Myrann Newashish	Canada
Migrations		Jacques Newashish	Canada
Notcimik itekera		Eden Mallina Awashish	Canada
The Old Man and the River	Kice iriniw acitc sipiriw	Steven Chilton	Canada
Tobacco	Tcictemaw	Jessica Vollant	Canada
Transmission		Marie-Kristine Petiquay	Canada
We Are the Future	Nous sommes l'avenir	Marie-Pier Chachai	Canada

==== Valentin Noujaïm Trilogy ====
English title	Original title	Director(s)	Country
La Défense I : Pacific Club		Valentin Noujaïm	France
La Défense II : To Exist Under Permanent Suspicion		Valentin Noujaïm	France
La Défense III : Demons to Diamonds		Valentin Noujaïm	France

==== Spotlight: Yan Giroux ====
The early short films of filmmaker Yan Giroux, in conjunction with the competitive screening of his new feature film My Son Came Back to Disappear (Mon fils ne revint que sept jours).

English title	Original title	Director(s)	Country
Le Blizzard		Yan Giroux	Canada
Il faut que je parle à mon père		Yan Giroux	Canada
Lost Paradise Lost		Yan Giroux	Canada
Mi niña mi vida		Yan Giroux	Canada
Standardized Patient Program	Programme d'utilisation des patients standardisés	Yan Giroux	Canada
Surveillant		Yan Giroux	Canada

=== The New Alchemists, Short Films ===
English title	Original title	Director(s)	Production country
Arguments in Favor of Love		Gabriel Abrantes	Portugal
Bozo Over Roses		Matty Sidle	United States, Hungary, Germany
Bread Will Walk	Le pain se lève	Alex Boya	Canada
The Conjured Ones	Les conjurados	Humberto González Bustillo	Venezuela
Daria's Night Flowers		Maryam Tafakory	Iran, France, United Kingdom
Felt		Blake Williams	Canada
Force Times Displacement		Angel Wu	Taiwan
Glasses	An-Gyeong	Yumi Joung	South Korea
Homunculus		Bonheur Suprême	France, Italy
I Saw the Face of God in the Jet Wash		Mark Jenkin	United Kingdom
if you seek amy		Ela Kazdal	United Kingdom, Turkey
Inanna		Dragos Badita	Canada, Romania
Karmash		Aleem Bukhari	Pakistan
Koki, Ciao		Quenton Miller	Netherlands
Land of Barbar		Fredj Moussa	Tunisia
Memory Is an Animal, It Barks with Many Mouths		Eva Giolo	Belgium
Merrimundi		Niles Atallah	Chile
The Orchards	Al Basateen	Antoine Chapon	France
Pourrir/T'Aimer		Lou Scamble	Canada
Rojo Žalia Blau		Viktoria Schmid	Austria
Sixty-Seven Milliseconds		fleuryfontaine	France
Some of You Fucked Eva		Lilith Grasmug	France
A Suspended Tide	Une marégraphie suspendue	Félix Caraballo	Canada
Their Eyes		Nicolas Gourault	France
This Is Not Your Garden	Este no es tu jardín	Carlos Velandia, Angélica Restrepo	Colombia
Um		Nieto	France
Uncovered	Nu·e·s	Max Vannienschoot	Canada

=== Pan-Canadian (RPCÉ) Student Short Film Competition ===
This year's international partner in the RPCÉ competition is the FESPACO festival in Burkina Faso.

English title	Original title	Director(s)	Institution
0004ngel		Eli Jean Tahchi	INIS
Accusé de réception		Julien Grandmont	Université Laval
Après le silence		Jean-François Cameron	INIS
L'audition		Anaïs Kere	FESPACO
Beneath Our Skin		Ngaire Lyden-Elleray	University of British Columbia
Une brèche écarlate		Laurence Ly	INIS
Le chaos des nymphes		Jean-François Cameron	INIS
Con Fretta!		Justine Pozon	Alberta University of the Arts
Crimson		François Trahan, Alhya Carbone, Tristan Beaulieu, Sarah Guilbeault	Cégep de Saint-Hyacinthe
Cured by Death		Bolun Zhao	University of Toronto
In My Child's Mind	Dans ma tête d'enfant	Marie-Sophie Gagné, Charles Bergeron	Cégep de Saint-Félicien
Dernière neige		Joseph Asselin	Université de Montréal
Des gens vivent ici		Gabrielle Côté	Université du Québec à Montréal
Déviellusion		Éloîse Stuyck	Collège Lionel-Groulx
Dissonance		Andréanne Ferland, Alexis Pilote, Philippe Faucher	Cégep de Sainte-Foy
Donde la Luna no Brilla		Luis Eduardo Alonzo-Paz	Concordia University
L'éléphant dans la pièce		Flavie Laplante	Cégep de Saint-Laurent
Les épiphanies		Jeanne Perney	Cégep de Rivière-du-Loup
The Feast (For my beloved son)		Sara Gonzalez Lopez	Les Écoles Créatives
Fils de chien		Maude Vimal du Monteil	Collège Jean-de-Brébeuf
Le foyer de la création		Olympe Lessard	Cégep de Rimouski
Hiver nucléaire		Chloé Décarie	Cégep du Vieux Montréal
I		Ylane Massam	Champlain College Saint-Lambert
Lullaby for a Deathdream		Charlie Galea McClure	Concordia University
Les masques		Charlotte-Samuela Lambo, Maria-Fernanda Hinojosa, Sirine-Djalila Beghdadi, Zaynab Iamrini	Cégep André-Laurendeau
Micheline		Maude Demers-Rivard	INIS
Mullein		Will Fitzsimmons	Simon Fraser University
Nocturne		Andrew Przybytkowski	INIS
Noyade		Hugo Belhassen	INIS
Phoenix		Marylène Houle	Wapikoni mobile
Le planeur		Maude Demers-Rivard	INIS
Pulsions harmonieuses		Loïc Djibom	Université Laval
Sans la moindre trace		Hugo Belhassen	INIS
Le scorpion et la grenouille		Arthur Schwab	O'Sullivan College
Le serment de Boukary		Sagou Bannou	FESPACO
Siob		Laura Marroquín-Éthier	INIS
Sous le voile de nos silences		Délia Ido	FESPACO
Sydney		Grant Earl MacIntosh	NSCAD University
La vierge de fer		Maé Pozzolo, Léo Salaun	Université du Québec en Abitibi-Témiscamingue
What Vermin Is This?		Ava J. Stanley	Emily Carr University of Art and Design

=== P'tits loups ===
Short film program of animation for children.

English title	Original title	Director(s)	Production country
Awaiting the Lightning Bolt		Marco Russo	United Kingdom, Italy
Bobel's Kitchen		Fiona Rolland	Belgium
Les Bottes de la nuit		Pierre-Luc Granjon	France
Cardboard		J.P. Vine	United Kingdom
Dans ma tête d'enfant		Marie-Sophe Gagné, Charles Bergeron	Canada
Filante		Marion Jamault	France
Forevergreen		Nathan Engelhardt, Jeremy Spears	United States
Komaneko: A New Journey	Komaneko no kaigai ryokou	Tsuneo Goda	Japan
The Legend of the Hummingbird		Morgan Devos	France
A Night at the Rest Area		Saki Muramoto	Japan
Outside the Milky Way		Jasmine Carpentier	Canada
Snow Bear		Aaron Blaise	United States
