= Phoenixes (film) =

- French: Phénix
- Directed by: Jonathan Beaulieu-Cyr
- Written by: Jonathan Beaulieu-Cyr
- Produced by: Fanny Forest
- Starring: Maxime Genois; Aksel Leblanc; Evelyne Brochu
- Cinematography: Ariane Falardeau St-Amour
- Edited by: Paul Chotel; Omar Elhamy
- Music by: Ouri
- Production company: Sans Rancoeur Films
- Distributed by: h264 Distribution
- Release date: September 13, 2024 (FCVQ)
- Running time: 90 minutes
- Country: Canada
- Language: French

Phoenixes (French: Phénix) is a Canadian drama film, directed and written by Jonathan Beaulieu-Cyr, and released in 2024.

== Synopsis ==
In the mid-2000s, Joël Girard (Maxime Genois), a charismatic and endearing soldier in the Canadian military, is about to be deployed to Afghanistan. His wife and son, Michelle (Evelyne Brochu) and Jacob (Aksel Leblanc), must learn to live with this new reality: this new mission comes with real risk. In an effort to get closer to Jacob, Joël starts coaching his soccer team, the Phoenixes. Despite his efforts, a rift will grow between him and his son.

== Production ==
This is Beaulieu-Cyr's first feature film as an individual, having previously codirected the docudrama Mad Dog Labine (2018) with Renaud Lessard.

Jonathan Beaulieu-Cyr wrote the screenplay based in part on his own experiences as the son of a soldier who fought in Afghanistan.

The film was shot in fall 2023, in and around Quebec City.

The cast also includes Alexandre Landry, Rosemarie Sabor, Francis La Haye, Maxime Desjardins-Tremblay, Charles Fournier, Étienne Lou, Nadia Girard Eddahia and Stéfanelle Auger in supporting roles.

== Distribution ==
The film had its world premiere at the Quebec City Film Festival (FCVQ) on September 13, 2024, where it won a Special Mention from the Jury for Best First Fiction Feature. It was later also screened in the Borsos Competition program at the 2024 Whistler Film Festival.

The film was released in Quebec on August 22, 2025.

== Awards ==
Award	Date of ceremony	Category	Recipient(s)	Result	Ref(s)
Quebec City Film Festival	2024	Best First Feature Film, Special Jury Mention	Jonathan Beaulieu-Cyr	Won	
Whistler Film Festival	2024	Best Director of a Borsos Competition Film	Jonathan Beaulieu-Cyr	Won	
Whistler Film Festival	2024	Best Cinematography in a Borsos Competition Film	Ariane Falardeau St-Amour	Won	
Rendez-vous Québec Cinéma	2025	Gilles Carle Award	Jonathan Beaulieu-Cyr	Won	
Prix Iris	2025	Revelation of the Year	Aksel Leblanc	Nominated	
Prix collégial du cinéma québécois	2026	Best Feature Film	Jonathan Beaulieu-Cyr	Won	
