= Without Havana =

Sin La Habana
- Directed by: Kaveh Nabatian
- Written by: Kaveh Nabatian
- Produced by: Gabrielle Tougas-Fréchette; Ménaïc Raoul
- Starring: Yonah Acosta; Evelyn O’Farrill; Aki Yaghoubi
- Cinematography: Juan Pablo Ramírez
- Edited by: Sophie Leblond
- Music by: Kaveh Nabatian
- Production company: Voyelles Films
- Distributed by: Maison 4:3
- Release date: October 7, 2020 (FNC)
- Running time: 94 minutes
- Countries: Canada, Cuba
- Languages: Spanish; English; Persian

Sin La Habana is a Canadian-Cuban drama film, directed by Kaveh Nabatian and released in 2020.

The film stars Yonah Acosta as Leonardo, a ballet dancer in Cuba who feels stifled and in need of emigration to another country to advance his career. He and his girlfriend Sara (Evelyn O’Farrill) devise a plan for the duo to get out of Cuba by having Leonardo seduce Nasim (Aki Yaghoubi), a tourist from Montreal, so that she will take him back to Canada with her and then he can send for Sara once he's settled in; however, both Leonardo and Sara are secretly also looking for ways to break off their relationship.

The film premiered at the 2020 Festival du nouveau cinéma, before going into commercial release in September 2021.

Sin la Habana received positive reviews from film critics. It holds a 91% rating on review aggregator website Rotten Tomatoes and was a New York Times Critic's Pick.

== Accolades ==
Year	Award	Category	Recipient(s)	Result	Ref.
2020	Festival du nouveau cinéma	Prix de la diffusion Quebecor	Kaveh Nabatian	Won	
2021	Vancouver International Film Festival	Best Canadian Film	Kaveh Nabatian	Won	
2021	Directors Guild of Canada	DGC Discovery Award	Kaveh Nabatian	Nominated	
2021	Les Percéides	Grand Prix du Jury	Kaveh Nabatian	Won	
2021	Miami International Film Festival	Jordan Ressler First Feature Award	Kaveh Nabatian	Nominated	
2021	Reelworld Film Festival	Standout Director	Kaveh Nabatian	Won	
2021	Reelworld Film Festival	Standout Writer	Kaveh Nabatian and Pablo Herrera	Won	
2021	Reelworld Film Festival	Standout Cinematographer	Juan Pablo Ramírez	Won	
2021	Reelworld Film Festival	Standout Actor	Yonah Acosta	Won	
2021	Reelworld Film Festival	Standout Actress	Aki Yaghoubi	Won	
2022	10th Canadian Screen Awards	Best Original Screenplay	Kaveh Nabatian	Nominated	
2022	10th Canadian Screen Awards	John Dunning Best First Feature Award	Kaveh Nabatian	Nominated	
2022	24th Quebec Cinema Awards	Best Film	Ménaïc Raoul, Gabrielle Tougas-Fréchette	Nominated	
2022	24th Quebec Cinema Awards	Best Director	Kaveh Nabatian	Nominated	
2022	24th Quebec Cinema Awards	Revelation of the Year	Yonah Acosta	Nominated	
2022	24th Quebec Cinema Awards	Best Screenplay	Kaveh Nabatian	Nominated	
2022	24th Quebec Cinema Awards	Best Editing	Sophie Leblond	Nominated	
2022	24th Quebec Cinema Awards	Best Sound	Sylvain Bellemare, Laurent Ouellette, Hans Laitres	Nominated	
2022	24th Quebec Cinema Awards	Best First Film	Kaveh Nabatian	Won	
2022	Rendez-vous Québec Cinéma	Prix Gilles-Carle	Kaveh Nabatian	Won	
