= With Jeff =

- Film poster
- French: Avec Jeff, à moto
- Directed by: Marie-Ève Juste
- Written by: Marie-Ève Juste
- Produced by: Ménaïc Raoul; Gabrielle Tougas-Fréchette
- Starring: Laury Verdieu; Liridon Rashiti
- Cinematography: Ian Lagarde
- Edited by: Felix Dufour-Laperrière
- Production company: Voyelles Films
- Release date: May 10, 2012 (Cannes)
- Running time: 15 minutes
- Country: Canada
- Language: French

With Jeff (French: Avec Jeff, à moto) is a Canadian drama film, directed by Marie-Ève Juste and released in 2012. The film stars Laury Verdieu as Nydia, a shy, quiet Haitian Canadian student leading a regimented and isolated life, who gains a taste of freedom when she accepts a motorcycle ride from her classmate Jeff (Liridon Rashiti).

The film premiered in the Director's Fortnight at the 2012 Cannes Film Festival, and had its Canadian premiere in the Short Cuts program at the 2012 Toronto International Film Festival.

The film received a Prix Jutra nomination for Best Short Film at the 15th Jutra Awards in 2013.
