= The Heart of Madame Sabali =

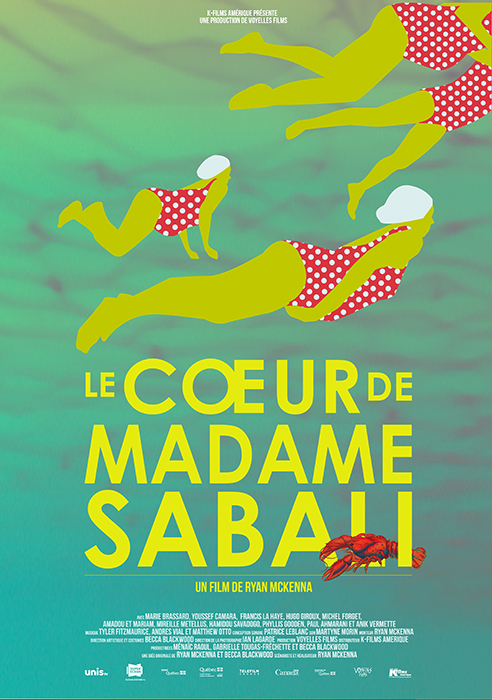
- Film poster
- French: Le Cœur de Madame Sabali
- Directed by: Ryan McKenna
- Written by: Ryan McKenna; Becca Blackwood
- Produced by: Ménaïc Raoul; Gabrielle Tougas-Fréchette; Becca Blackwood
- Starring: Marie Brassard; Francis La Haye; Youssef Camara
- Cinematography: Ian Lagarde
- Edited by: Ryan McKenna
- Music by: Amadou & Mariam; Tyler Fitzmaurice; Matthew Otto; Andres Vial
- Production company: Voyelles Films
- Distributed by: K Films Amérique
- Release date: October 2, 2015 (VIFF)
- Running time: 79 minutes
- Country: Canada
- Language: French

The Heart of Madame Sabali (French: Le Cœur de Madame Sabali) is a 2015 Canadian tragicomedy film co-written and directed by Ryan McKenna. It stars Marie Brassard, Amadou & Mariam, Youssef Camara and Paul Ahmarani.

The film won the Focus Grand Prize for Canadian/Québec Film at the 2015 Festival de nouveau Cinéma.

== Plot ==
Jeannette (Brassard) is a white Québécois woman with a severe heart condition living in a suburb of Montreal. After undergoing transplant surgery where she receives the heart of a Malian woman named Madame Sabali (Mireille Métellus), she begins to experience flashbacks of her donor's brutal murder. Soon thereafter, Jeannette becomes friends with Madame Sabali's son Chibale (Camara), who believes she is the reincarnation of his mother.

== Response ==
The film won the Grand Prix Focus at the 2015 Festival du nouveau cinéma, and Brassard received a Vancouver Film Critics Circle nomination for Best Actress in a Canadian Film at the Vancouver Film Critics Circle Awards 2015.
