= Montreal Film Festival =

Montreal Film Festival may refer to:

- Montreal Independent Film Festival (2020–present)
- Montreal International Film Festival (1960–1967)
- Montreal World Film Festival (1977–2019)
- Festival International de Films de Montréal (2005)

== See also ==
- Montreal International Documentary Festival
- Category:Film festivals in Montreal
