= Sheila de La Varende =

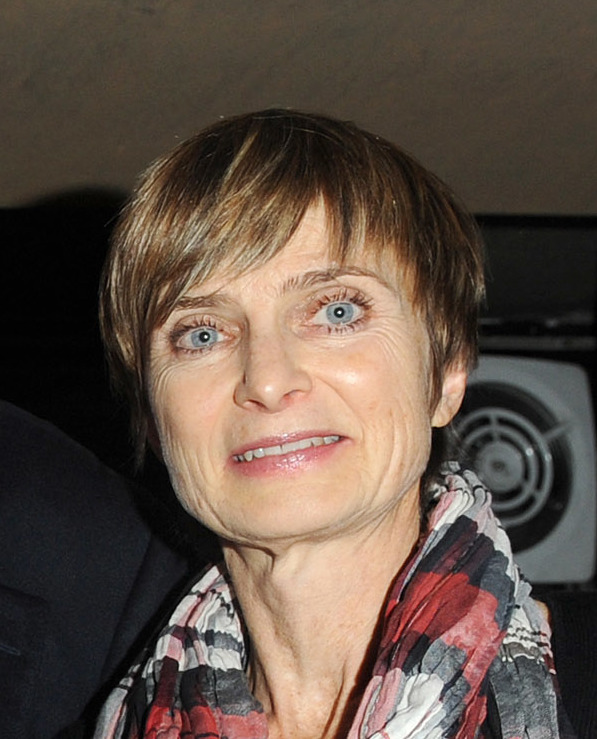
- Sheila de La Varende in 2011
- Born: October 3, 1960
- Died: November 22, 2017 (aged 57); Montreal
- Occupations: film and television executive

Sheila de La Varende was a Canadian film and television executive. De La Varende joined Telefilm Canada in 1995, eventually rising to its senior leadership circle. She worked there from 1995 to 2004, and 2009, until her death, in 2017.

In 2004 she served as executive director of Montreal's Festival du nouveau cinema. Working next at Canada's National Film Board.

De La Varende played a key role in introducing Canadian film and television to European distributors.

== Personal life ==
De La Varende grew up in Ottawa. Her husband, François de La Varende, was a French Count.

De La Varende, a non-smoker, was diagnosed with lung cancer, in 2011, had several years of remission. Her cancer returned in 2015, and in 2017, she had a physician assisted death.
