= Henri Pardo =

Canadian actor

Henri Pardo is a Canadian actor and filmmaker. He is most noted as director of the documentary film Dear Jackie, which was a nominee for the Donald Brittain Award at the 11th Canadian Screen Awards in 2023.

Born in Edmundston, New Brunswick to immigrant parents from Haiti, he moved with his family to Montreal, Quebec, in childhood.

He began his career as an actor, most notably starring in Jephté Bastien's 2010 film Exit 67 (Sortie 67), but after finding that as a Black Canadian he was generally only offered supporting roles without much depth, he enrolled at the Institut national de l'image et du son in the middle 2000s to learn filmmaking so that he could actively engage with improving Black representation in film and television. He directed the short films Sous bois (2013) and Jack (2020) prior to releasing Dear Jackie in 2021.

In addition to the Canadian Screen Award nomination for Dear Jackie, Pardo was the winner of the Magnus Isacsson Award at the 2021 Montreal International Documentary Festival.

His narrative feature debut, Kanaval, premiered in the Centrepiece program at the 2023 Toronto International Film Festival, where it was named the winner of the Amplify Voices Award for Best Film, and received an honorable mention from the Best Canadian Film jury. He received two CSA nominations at the 12th Canadian Screen Awards in 2024 for Kanaval, in the categories of Best Director and the John Dunning Best First Feature Award.

In 2026, he was named the recipient of the Charles Officer Award at the opening of the Canada's Top Ten screening series.
