= Ménaïc Raoul =

Ménaîc Raoul is a Canadian film producer and commercial producer. She is most noted as producer, alongside Gabrielle Tougas-Fréchette, of the films The Twentieth Century, which was a Canadian Screen Award nominee for Best Motion Picture at the 8th Canadian Screen Awards in 2020, was in TIFF Canada's Top Ten 2020, and was selected at Berlinale 2021 and Without Havana (Sin la Habana), which was a Prix Iris nominee for Best Film at the 24th Quebec Cinema Awards in 2022.

Her other credits have included the films Wintergreen (Paparmane), With Jeff (Avec Jeff, à moto), Blue Thunder (Bleu tonnerre), The Heart of Madame Sabali (Le Cœur de Madame Sabali), All You Can Eat Buddha, Nouveau Québec and L'Autre.

She won Global producer of the year at The Gotham Week in Brooklyn on October 2, 2025
