= FIFM =

FIFM may refer to:

- Festival International du Film de Marrakech, or Marrakech International Film Festival
- Festival International de Films de Montréal, or New Montreal FilmFest
