= Karmash =

2025 Pakistani short film

- Directed by: Aleem Bukhari
- Written by: Aleem Bukhari
- Produced by: Irfan Noor K
- Cinematography: Aleem Bukhari
- Edited by: Aleem Bukhari, Shahzain Ali Detho
- Production company: Sleepbyte Films
- Release date: 22 May 2025
- Running time: 15 minutes
- Country: Pakistan
- Language: Urdu

Karmash is a 2025 Pakistani experimental short film written and directed by Aleem Bukhari. It premiered on 22 May 2025 at the Directors' Fortnight (Quinzaine des Cinéastes) section of the Cannes Film Festival. The film explores memory, ancestry, and cultural erasure through a fragmented and poetic cinematic style.

== Synopsis ==
The film follows the last heir of the fictional Karmash tribe as he wanders through decaying ruins and fractured memories of his ancestors. Structured in a non-linear narrative with sparse dialogue, it explores the erasure of cultural identity over time. The imagery blends ghostly black-and-white cinematography with ambient soundscapes to create an atmosphere of haunting and loss.

== Production ==
Karmash was produced by a small team of six collaborators using minimal resources, described in Pakistani and international media as an example of "guerrilla filmmaking." The film was shot on a Sony A6400 with a 35 mm lens, relying mostly on natural light. Sound design was by Aleem Bukhari, Shahzain Ali Detho and Muhammad Ali Shaikh.The film’s black-and-white aesthetic and spectral imagery were developed to reflect its central themes of loss and memory.

== Release ==
- 22 May 2025 World Premiere at Directors' Fortnight during the Cannes Film Festival.
- Official selection at FEST (Portugal), in the “Silver Fiction” section.
- Official selection at the Festival du nouveau cinéma in Montréal.
- Featured in a Variety panel on Pakistani cinema at Cannes 2025.

== Reception ==
Cahiers du Cinéma described Karmash as a "hypnotic, fractured memoryscape" and “a testament to how austerity sharpens cinematic vision,” situating it within a "new guerrilla poetic wave" from Pakistan. Outlook India gave the film 4 out of 5 stars, calling it "an unnerving, fractured mood piece on cultural erasure." Asian Movie Pulse called it "a portrait of forced madness," praising its experimental sound and visual style. Arabian Moda highlighted its "ghostly and lyrical" black-and-white cinematography. Dawn Images profiled the film's grassroots production and its significance as a milestone for Pakistani cinema. Variety placed the film within a growing creative surge in South Asia. Mid-Day and Financial Express highlighted its presence at Cannes as a regional breakthrough.

== Themes ==
Critics identified Karmash as a meditation on cultural erasure, ancestral memory, and political displacement. Cahiers du Cinéma and Dunya Digital contextualized the film as part of a rising Pakistani "guerrilla cinema" movement. The film's non-linear structure, sparse dialogue, and stark monochrome visuals align it with experimental and poetic cinema traditions. It has been described as the first Pakistani short to be officially selected at Directors' Fortnight, marking a symbolic moment for Pakistani cinema at Cannes.
