= Vapor (film) =

- Directed by: Kaveh Nabatian
- Written by: Kaveh Nabatian
- Produced by: Marie-Luc Beaudin; Cédric Bourdeau; Stéphane Tanguay
- Starring: Marco Ledezma; Evergon
- Cinematography: Christophe Collette
- Edited by: Elric Robichon
- Music by: Bell Orchestre
- Production company: Productions Kinesis
- Distributed by: Locomotion Distributions
- Release date: July 14, 2010 (JFL)
- Running time: 10 minutes
- Country: Canada
- Language: Spanish

Vapor is a Canadian comedy-drama short film, directed by Kaveh Nabatian and released in 2010. The film depicts the emotional journey of Enrique Salgado (Marco Ledezma), a middle-aged gay Mexican man, through shame, fear and internalized homophobia toward self-acceptance, after being invited to pose in the nude for a photographer (Evergon).

The film was named to the Toronto International Film Festival's year-end Canada's Top Ten list for 2010. It received a Genie Award nomination for Best Live Action Short Drama at the 31st Genie Awards, and a Prix Jutra nomination for Best Short Film at the 13th Jutra Awards.
