= Lilou Roy-Lanouette =

Canadian actress (born 2010)

Lilou Roy-Lanouette (born 2010) is a Canadian teenage actress from Chambly, Quebec. She is most noted for her performance in the 2019 film Jouliks, for which she received a Prix Iris nomination for Revelation of the Year at the 22nd Quebec Cinema Awards in 2020.

She also received two Young Artist Award nominations for Jouliks, in the categories of Best Leading Young Actress in a Feature Film and Best Young Artist in a Voice Acting Role.

She also appeared in Annie St-Pierre's 2021 short film Like the Ones I Used to Know (Les grandes claques) and Joëlle Desjardins Paquette's 2022 feature film Rodeo (Rodéo), and in an episode of Transplant.
