= David Clerson =

Canadian novelist from Quebec

David Clerson (born 1978 in Sherbrooke, Quebec) is a Canadian novelist from Quebec, who won the Grand Prix littéraire Archambault in 2014 for his debut novel Frères. Brothers, the novel's English translation by Katia Grubisic, was published in November 2016 and was a shortlisted finalist for the Governor General's Award for French to English translation at the 2017 Governor General's Awards.

His second novel, En rampant, was published in 2016.

His third book, Dormir sans tête was published in 2019 and was a shortlisted finalist for the Grand Prix du livre de Montréal. This short story collection was translated by Katia Grubisic under the title To See Out The Night.

In 2023, he published the novel Mon fils ne revint que sept jours. The novel was adapted by director Yan Giroux for the 2025 film My Son Came Back to Disappear.

In 2024, he published the novel Les années désertées.
