= My Son Came Back to Disappear =

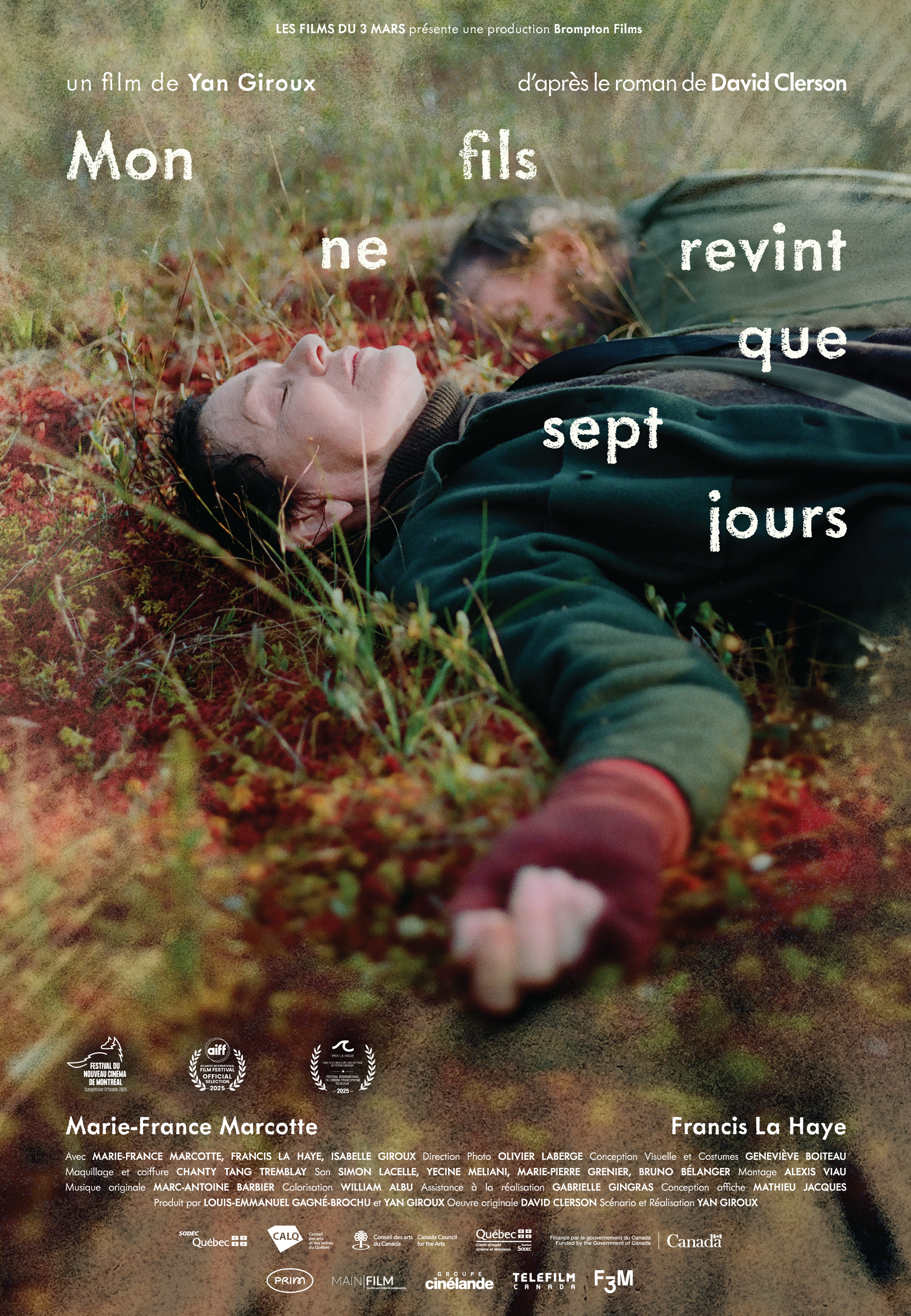
- French: Mon fils ne revint que sept jours
- Directed by: Yan Giroux
- Screenplay by: Yan Giroux
- Based on: Mon fils ne revint que sept jours by David Clerson
- Produced by: Yan Giroux; Louis-Emmanuel Gagné-Brochu
- Starring: Marie-France Marcotte; Francis La Haye
- Cinematography: Olivier Laberge
- Edited by: Alexis Viau
- Music by: Marc-Antoine Barbier
- Production companies: Brompton Films; Déjà Vu
- Distributed by: Les Films du 3 mars
- Release date: September 11, 2025 (AIFF)
- Running time: 80 minutes
- Country: Canada
- Language: French

My Son Came Back to Disappear (French: Mon fils ne revint que sept jours) is a Canadian drama film, directed by Yan Giroux and released in 2025. Adapted from the novel Mon fils ne revint que sept jours by David Clerson, the film stars Marie-France Marcotte as Suzanne, a woman living an isolated life in the forest whose son Mathieu (Francis La Haye) unexpectedly returns for a visit after many years without contact, and asks her to take him to the peat bog he remembers her taking him to as a child.

The film premiered on September 11, 2025, at the 2025 Atlantic International Film Festival. It subsequently screend in the National Competition at the 2025 Festival du nouveau cinéma, where it received a special mention from the award jury.
