= Barbaracadabra =

- Directed by: Barbara Ulrich; Renaud Lessard
- Written by: Barbara Ulrich; Renaud Lessard
- Produced by: Renaud Lessard
- Starring: Barbara Ulrich; Renaud Lessard
- Cinematography: Barbara Ulrich; Renaud Lessard
- Edited by: Paul Chotel; Renaud Lessard
- Production company: Les Moyens de Production
- Release date: October 14, 2025 (FNC)
- Running time: 82 minutes
- Country: Canada

Barbaracadabra is a Canadian docufiction film, directed by Barbara Ulrich and Renaud Lessard and released in 2025.

Described by media as a "cinematic unidentified flying object", the film centres on Ulrich's desire to direct a film, 60 years after her star-making role in the 1963 film The Cat in the Bag (Le Chat dans le sac). It documents her friendship and collaboration with Lessard during the COVID-19 pandemic through her creative struggles with her fear of failure and her uncertainty about what kind of film she even wants to make, as she continually compares herself against the cinematic legacy of her late husband, film director Gilles Groulx.

The film premiered in the national competition at the 2025 Festival du nouveau cinéma, before going into commercial release in March 2026.
