= Dany Boivin =

Canadian art director and production designer

Dany Boivin is a Canadian art director and production designer. He is most noted for his work on the film The Twentieth Century, for which he won both the Canadian Screen Award for Best Art Direction/Production Design at the 8th Canadian Screen Awards and the Prix Iris for Best Art Direction at the 22nd Quebec Cinema Awards.

His prior credits included the films Bydlo and The Tesla World Light.
