= Barbara Ulrich =

Canadian actress and filmmaker (born 1945)

- Born: 1945 (age 80–81); New York City
- Occupation: Actress
- Spouse: Gilles Groulx (1960s-1994)

Barbara Ulrich (born 1945) is a Canadian actress and filmmaker, best known for her role as Barbara in the 1964 film The Cat in the Bag (Le Chat dans le sac).

She was born in New York City to Jewish parents, before moving to Montreal, Quebec, with her family in the early 1950s.

Despite having had a starring role in one of the most important films in Quebec and Canadian cinematic history, she did not maintain an acting career for many years afterward, instead concentrating on her family life with director Gilles Groulx. Following Groulx's death in 1994 she remained active in promoting his cinematic legacy, serving as a spokesperson for his estate in film retrospectives and other later coverage of his career. She began to take occasional acting roles again in the 2000s, appearing in films such as Danny in the Sky, Ascension, and Mad Dog Labine.

She collaborated with Renaud Lessard on the 2025 film Barbaracadabra, a comedic documentary about Ulrich grappling with her desire to add film directing to her résumé late in life. The film premiered in the National Competition at the 2025 Festival du nouveau cinéma.

== Filmography ==
Barbara Ulrich film and television credits
Year	Title	Role	Notes	Ref.
1964	The Cat in the Bag (Le Chat dans le sac)	Barbara	Theatrical film	
1965	Festival	Herself	Episode: "Cine Boom"	
1976	The Duchess and the Dirtwater Fox	Maisie	Theatrical film	
1995	Too Much Is Enough (Trop c'est assez)	Herself	Documentary film	
1995	Brief Encounters and Light Inclinations (Brèves rencontres et légers penchants)			
2001	Danny in the Sky	Baba	Theatrical film	
2002	Ascension	Older Woman	Theatrical film	
2016	Quebec My Country Mon Pays	Herself	Documentary film	
2018	Mad Dog Labine	Colette	Theatrical film	
2019	Forgotten Flowers (Les Fleurs oubliés)	Barbara	Theatrical film	
2025	Death Does Not Exist (La mort n'existe pas)	Voice role	Theatrical film	
2025	Barbaracadabra	Herself	Theatrical film. Also codirector with Renaud Lessard	
