= Katia Grubisic =

Canadian writer, editor and translator

- Born: April 25, 1978 (age 48); Toronto, Ontario
- Education: University of New Brunswick; Concordia University
- Occupations: Writer; editor; translator

Katia Grubisic (born April 25, 1978, in Toronto, Ontario) is a Canadian writer, editor and translator.

== Biography ==
Katia Grubisic completed French and English literature degrees at the University of New Brunswick, and received her master's degree in English from Concordia University.

Her collection What if red ran out (Goose Lane Editions, 2008) won the Gerald Lampert Memorial Award for best first book, and was a finalist for the Quebec Writers' Federation A.M. Klein Prize for Poetry. Grubisic has also won the CV2 2-Day Poem Contest, has earned an honourable mention at the National Magazine Awards, has been a finalist for the CBC Literary Awards and the Descant/Winston Collins Prize, and was nominated for a Pushcart Prize. Her poetry and fiction have appeared in The Malahat Review, Grain and Prairie Fire, in the anthologies Pith & Wry: Canadian Poetry, Regreen: New Canadian Ecological Poetry and The Hoodoo You Do So Well, and in other Canadian and international publications. She has reviewed books for The Globe and Mail and The Montreal Review of Books, among others.

She has been guest faculty in creative writing at Bishop's University, and has taught in cegeps and for the Quebec Writers' Federation. She has acted on the editorial boards of Qwerty, The Fiddlehead and The New Quarterly, and was an editor for Goose Lane Editions' Icehouse Poetry imprint and for Linda Leith Publishing. Her 2008 guest-edited Montreal issue of The New Quarterly won an honourable mention in the Best Single Issue category at the National Magazine Awards. She has been editor-in-chief of Arc Poetry Magazine and, from 2008 to 2012, was the coordinator of the Atwater Poetry Project reading series.

She won the 2024 Governor General's Award for French to English translation for Nights Too Short to Dance, her translation of Marie-Claire Blais's Un cœur habité de mille voix. She was previously shortlisted for the 2017 Governor General's Awards for Brothers, her translation of David Clerson's novel Frères, and the 2021 Governor General's Awards for A Cemetery for Bees, her translation of Alina Dumitrescu's Le cimetière des abeilles.

Her translation of Clerson's short-story collection Dormir sans tête, as To See Out the Night, won the 2023 Quebec Writers' Federation Cole Foundation Prize for Translation.

== Published works ==
=== Poetry ===
- What if red ran out. Fredericton, NB: Goose Lane Editions, 2008. (Poetry)

=== Essays & anthologies ===
- “Ways of Looking,” in Culture in Transit: Translating the Literature of Quebec, ed. S. Simon, revised and expanded edition, Véhicule Press, 2020.
- “A Very Good Chance of Getting Somewhere Else,” in The Edge of the Precipice: Why Read Literature in the Digital Age, ed. P. Socken, McGill-Queen's University Press, 2013.
- The New Quarterly. Montreal issue / #106, 2008. (Guest editor)
- Croatian Literature in English. Školska knjiga, 2008. (Co-editor, with Vinko Grubišić)
- Penned: Zoo Poems. Véhicule Press, 2009. (Anthology, co-editor, with Stephanie Bolster and Simon Reader)
- The New Quarterly. "Extra: Writers on Everything but Writing," 2010. (Guest Editor)

=== Translation ===
- The Schubert Treatment. A Story of Music and Healing (Le pansement Schubert) by Claire Oppert, Greystone Books, 2024.
- Nights Too Short to Dance (Un cœur habité de mille voix) by Marie-Claire Blais, Second Story Press, 2023.
- A Knife in the Sky (Femmes au temps des carnassiers) by Marie-Célie Agnant, Inanna Publications, 2022.
- The Weight of Sand: My 450 Days Held Hostage in the Sahara (Le sablier : Otage au Sahara pendant 450 jours) by Édith Blais, Greystone Books, 2021.
- Songs for Angel (Chants pour Angel) by Marie-Claire Blais, House of Anansi Press, 2021.
- To See Out the Night (Dormir sans tête) by David Clerson, QC Fiction, 2021.
- A Cemetery for Bees (Le cimetière des abeilles) by Alina Dumitrescu, Linda Leith Publishing, 2021.
- In Avant Désir: A Nicole Brossard Reader, ed. S. Queyras, G. Robichaud & E. Wunker, selections: from A book (Un livre) by Nicole Brossard, and “Salon: Catherine Mavrikakis Talks with Nicole Brossard and Nathanaël,” Coach House Books, 2020.
- Daughter of Here (La Jetée, Elle s’appelera Mo) by Ioana Georgescu, Linda Leith Publishing, 2020.
- Little Girl Gazelle (L’Enfant gazelle) by Stéphane Martelly, illustrated by Albin Christen, ruelle, 2020
- ABCMTL (ABCMTL) by Jeanne Painchaud, illustrated by Bruno Ricca, ruelle, 2019.
- White Out (Blanc Dehors) by Martine Delvaux, Linda Leith Publishing, 2018.
- Brothers (Frères) David Clerson, QC Fiction, 2016.
- False Starts (Dialogues fantasques pour causeurs éperdus) by Louis Patrick Leroux, Talonbooks, 2016. (Translated with Alexander St-Laurent.)

== Awards ==
- 2024 Governor General's Literary Award for English-language Translation
- 2023 Cole Foundation Prize for Translation
- 2009 Gerald Lampert Award
