= The Twentieth Century (film) =

2019 Canadian comedy film

- Film poster
- Directed by: Matthew Rankin
- Written by: Matthew Rankin
- Produced by: Gabrielle Tougas-Fréchette; Ménaïc Raoul
- Starring: Dan Beirne; Catherine St-Laurent; Louis Negin; Brent Skagford
- Cinematography: Vincent Biron
- Edited by: Matthew Rankin
- Music by: Christophe Lamarche-Ledoux; Peter Venne
- Production company: Voyelles Films
- Distributed by: Oscilloscope Pictures
- Release date: September 10, 2019 (TIFF)
- Running time: 90 minutes
- Country: Canada
- Language: English

The Twentieth Century is a 2019 Canadian surrealist historical black comedy film written and directed by Matthew Rankin, in his feature directorial debut. The film presents a fictionalized portrait of the rise to power of former Canadian Prime Minister William Lyon Mackenzie King, played by Dan Beirne. The film also star Catherine St-Laurent, Louis Negin and Seán Cullen.

The film is not a realistic or literally accurate depiction of Canadian history, instead mixing and matching elements of real history with invented fantasia in a stylized manner reminiscent of the films of Guy Maddin, and taking place largely on deliberately unrealistic sets influenced by German Expressionism, 1940s melodrama and wartime propaganda films. Rankin himself described it as "one part Canadian Heritage Minute and one part ayahuasca death trip".

The film premiered at the 2019 Toronto International Film Festival, winning the award for Best Canadian First Feature Film. It received positive reviews from critics and won three Canadian Screen Awards out of eight nominations, including Best Motion Picture and Best Director.

== Overview ==
Although most of the film's major characters are at least loosely based on real Canadian historical figures, not all of their careers actually coexisted. In reality, although Mackenzie King and Arthur Meighen already knew and disliked each other by 1899, neither man had even entered electoral politics at all yet, let alone being candidates for Prime Minister, as of that time — while the real Bert Harper was never a political rival to either man, but merely a government bureaucrat. The real Lord Minto, further, was a benign figure who distinguished himself in Canadian history primarily as a patron of amateur sports, and his term as Governor General had already ended by the time either King or Meighen were in politics — whereas Lord Muto, his fictionalized portrayal in the film, is an Orwellian dictator with much more control over political affairs than Canadian Governors General actually have, who oversees Canadian politics in a manner more reminiscent of The Hunger Games than the real Canadian electoral process, and who is openly conspiring to draw the Canadian military much more deeply into the Boer War. Minto really did have daughters named Ruby and Violet, although both were only teenagers, not adult women, as of 1899. Joseph-Israël Tarte was also a real political figure who opposed the Boer War, although his political career did not overlap with King's or Meighen's.

According to Matthew Rankin, "I wanted everything to feel artificial all the time. The conceit of the film is that Canada might just be totally fake and in this person’s head. And the film is about his head. Everything in the film is drawn from Mackenzie King’s diary and reprocessed. I describe it as a nightmare that he might have had in 1899." He has also described the film as a satire on the overly earnest way that Canadian history is often presented in film and television, contrasting it against both Heritage Minutes and Sullivan Entertainment costume dramas.

The film also makes use of both cross-gender acting, with three significant characters (King's mother, J. Israël Tarte and Lady Violet) portrayed by cross-gender performers in drag, and colour-blind casting, with two White Anglo-Saxon Protestant characters (Bert Harper and Dr. Wakefield) portrayed by Asian-Canadian actors. Rankin has described this aspect of the film by saying that "I wanted to take a school-play approach that you don't see so much in film for some reason. In a school play you can have a Filipino Captain von Trapp and a transgender Artful Dodger and it's fine. In film, I don’t understand why there’s this pressure to always link an actor to their exact demographic profile."

== Cast ==
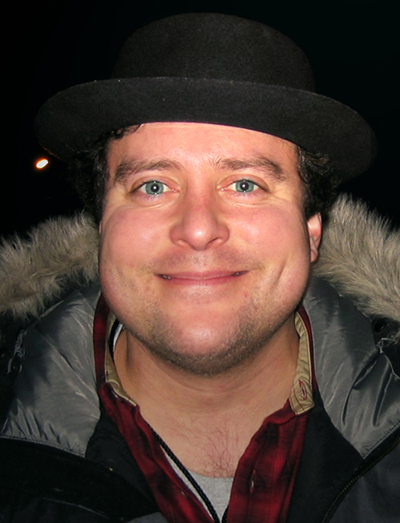
Seán Cullen plays the role of the Governor General.

- Dan Beirne as William Lyon Mackenzie King
- Catherine St-Laurent as Ruby Elliott
- Mikhaïl Ahooja as Henry Albert Harper
- Brent Skagford as Arthur Meighen
- Seán Cullen as Lord Muto, Governor General of Canada
- Louis Negin as Isabel Grace Mackenzie
- Kee Chan as Dr. Milton Wakefield
- Trevor Anderson as Mr. Justice Richardson
- Annie St-Pierre as J. Israël Tarte
- Richard Jutras as John King
- Sarianne Cormier as Nurse Lapointe
- Emmanuel Schwartz as Lady Violet
- Satine Scarlett Montaz as Little Charlotte
- Charlotte Legault as Angel of Britain
- Marc Ducusin as A. A. Heaps

== Release ==
The film premiered at the 2019 Toronto International Film Festival in the Midnight Madness program, and won the festival's award for Best Canadian First Feature Film. The film was subsequently screened at the 2019 Los Cabos International Film Festival, where it won the festival's Premio Competencia award.

=== Critical reaction ===
On review aggregator Rotten Tomatoes, the film has an approval rating of 93% based on 58 reviews, with an average rating of 7.80/10. The website's critical consensus reads, "A silly, surreal treat for fans of absurd comedy, The Twentieth Century takes a sideways -- and often deliriously entertaining -- look at Canadian history." On Metacritic, the film has a weighted average score of 77 out of 100, based on 15 critics, indicating "generally favorable reviews".

Film critic Peter Howell described the film as "Monty Python by way of Rankin’s fellow Winnipegger Guy Maddin", while David Friend of The Canadian Press said the film "subverts the mystique around politicians by mocking patriotism, propaganda and Canadian identity."

For The Hollywood Reporter, Jordan Mintzer described the film as "Guy Maddin meets John Waters by way of Powell and Pressburger".

In 2023, Barry Hertz of The Globe and Mail named the film as one of the 23 best Canadian comedy films ever made.

=== Accolades ===
In December 2019, the film was named to TIFF's annual year-end Canada's Top Ten list. The film received eight Canadian Screen Award nominations at the 8th Canadian Screen Awards in 2020.

Award	Date	Category	Nominee(s)	Result	Ref(s)
Berlin International Film Festival	20 February – 1 March 2020	FIPRESCI Prize (Forum)	Matthew Rankin	Won	
Canadian Screen Awards	28 May 2020	Best Motion Picture	Ménaïc Raoul, Gabrielle Tougas-Fréchette	Nominated	
Canadian Screen Awards	28 May 2020	Best Actor	Dan Beirne	Nominated	
Canadian Screen Awards	28 May 2020	Best Director	Matthew Rankin	Nominated	
Canadian Screen Awards	28 May 2020	Best Original Screenplay	Matthew Rankin	Nominated	
Canadian Screen Awards	28 May 2020	Best Art Direction/Production Design	Dany Boivin	Won	
Canadian Screen Awards	28 May 2020	Best Costume Design	Patricia McNeil	Won	
Canadian Screen Awards	28 May 2020	Best Hair	Nermin Grbic	Won	
Canadian Screen Awards	28 May 2020	John Dunning Best First Feature	Matthew Rankin	Nominated	
Directors Guild of Canada	26 October 2019	DGC Discovery Award	Matthew Rankin	Nominated	
Los Cabos International Film Festival	13 – 17 November 2019	Best Film	Matthew Rankin	Won	
Prix Iris	10 June 2020	Best Director	Matthew Rankin	Nominated	
Prix Iris	10 June 2020	Best Art Direction	Dany Boivin	Won	
Prix Iris	10 June 2020	Best Sound	Bernard Gariépy Strobl, Sacha Ratcliffe, Lynne Trépanier	Nominated	
Prix Iris	10 June 2020	Best Editing	Matthew Rankin	Nominated	
Prix Iris	10 June 2020	Best Costume Design	Patricia McNeil	Won	
Prix Iris	10 June 2020	Best Makeup	Adriana Verbert	Won	
Prix Iris	10 June 2020	Best Hairstyling	Nermin Grbic	Won	
Prix Iris	10 June 2020	Best First Film	Matthew Rankin	Nominated	
Toronto International Film Festival	5–15 September 2019	Best Canadian First Feature Film	Matthew Rankin	Won	
Vancouver Film Critics Circle	7 January 2020	Best Canadian Film	Matthew Rankin	Nominated	
Vancouver Film Critics Circle	7 January 2020	Best Director of a Canadian Film	Matthew Rankin	Nominated	
Vancouver Film Critics Circle	7 January 2020	One to Watch	Matthew Rankin	Won	
Vancouver Film Critics Circle	7 January 2020	Best Screenplay for a Canadian Film	Matthew Rankin	Nominated	
Vancouver Film Critics Circle	7 January 2020	Best Actor in a Canadian Film	Dan Beirne	Won	
Vancouver Film Critics Circle	7 January 2020	Best Supporting Actor in a Canadian Film	Louis Negin	Nominated	
Vancouver Film Critics Circle	7 January 2020	Best Supporting Actress in a Canadian Film	Catherine St-Laurent	Nominated	
Grindhouse Paradise	3 – 5 September 2021	Audience Prize	Matthew Rankin	Nominated	
