= Jonathan Beaulieu-Cyr =

Canadian film director

Jonathan Beaulieu-Cyr is a Canadian film director from Quebec. He is most noted as co-director with Renaud Lessard of the 2018 film Mad Dog Labine, which was a nominee for the John Dunning Best First Feature Award at the 8th Canadian Screen Awards, and for the Prix Iris for Best First Film at the 22nd Quebec Cinema Awards.

He was also a co-writer and co-producer of Omar Elhamy's 2020 short film Foam (Écume), which won the Prix Iris for Best Live Action Short Film at the 23rd Quebec Cinema Awards in 2021.

He grew up in Saint-Gabriel-de-Valcartier, Quebec, the son of a soldier in the Canadian military, and is a graduate of the Mel Hoppenheim School of Cinema at Concordia University.

His second feature film Phoenixes (Phénix), based in part on his own experiences growing up in a military family, premiered at the 2024 Quebec City Film Festival. It was later screened in the Borsos Competition program at the 2024 Whistler Film Festival, where Beaulieu-Cyr won the award for Best Direction in a Borsos Competition Film.
