= Wolves (2022 film) =

2022 Canadian thriller film

- Not the official poster
- Directed by: Danny Dunlop
- Written by: Danny Dunlop
- Produced by: Danny Dunlop; Franklin Eugene; Warren Dean Fulton; Taylor Re Lynn; Jake Raymond; Charles Solomon Jr. Ty Tatum; Kevin Tuck; Rajiv Whabi
- Starring: Mark Nocent
- Cinematography: Danny Dunlop
- Edited by: Danny Dunlop
- Music by: Danny Dunlop; Rachael Johnstone; Janice Kwan
- Production company: Black Wave
- Release date: April 1, 2022 (Cinequest)
- Running time: 103 minutes
- Country: Canada
- Language: English

Wolves is a 2022 Canadian psychological thriller film, written, directed, produced, shot, edited, and scored by Danny Dunlop. The film stars Mark Nocent as an unnamed lonely and directionless young man who becomes obsessed with trying to solve a series of killings and dismemberings of animals, after learning on the news that police psychological profilers have identified the likely perpetrator as somebody uncomfortably similar to himself.

The film was inspired by a real-life series of unsolved animal deaths in Dunlop's hometown of London, Ontario, in the late 2010s, which was identified as a public emergency due to the risk that recurring animal killings of this type are sometimes a precursor to the perpetrator becoming a serial killer of humans.

The film premiered April 1, 2022 as part of the Cinequest Film & Creativity Festival's virtual Cinejoy lineup, and was later screened as part of the festival's live in-theatre program in August. It had its Canadian premiere in August at the Regina International Film Festival.

== Cast ==
- Mark Nocent as Him
- Jake Raymond as Nate Wells
- Allan Dobrescu as Arthur
- Hugh Wilson as Michael Raymond
- Rod Keith as Jerry
- Chad Hamilton-Andrews as St. Peter
- Nate Oppel as Mikey
- Franklin Davis Jr. as Pawn Shop Pauly
- Holt McCallany as Westview Country Supply Manager (voice)
- Lawrene Denkers as Carol Dover
- Monika Meyer as Melissa Heathbridge
- Joyce Powell as Mom
- Ballo Harideen as Dad
- Nathaniel Keith as James
- Eric Schmidt as Garry
- Sarah Green as Garry's Mom
- Rick Guzman as Rick
- Maysee McLean as Darlene
- Cat Hostick as Alex
- Brent Baird as Stav
- Sharon Belle as Mother
- Tiffany Blom as Erica Conners

== Critical response ==
Alex Saveliev of Film Threat positively reviewed the film, praising Nocent's performance and writing that "Dunlop – who also wrote, edited, produced, shot, and co-wrote the score – is a true force of nature. He favors a contemplative mood, with static and slowly panning shots, gently luring the viewer into his twisted world. The filmmaker introduces several disorienting jump-cuts to the mix to reflect the protagonist’s disheveled state of mind. Everything in Wolves is immersed in monochrome gray, tar-black, and eggshell-white. From the gorgeous opening shot of a person jogging down by a river, streetlights reflected on its dark surface, to the final, restaurant-set sequence, Dunlop creates an atmosphere of unease and subliminal tension."

Brian Fanelli of Horror Buzz was more mixed, writing that "This feature is certainly an interesting character study, though, at times, it plods along a little too slowly. It feels like it takes the recluse a long time to finally crack the case. The rest of the film features the protagonist sitting alone in his apartment, staring at his laptop, or driving around late at night, checking out one seedy back alley after another. There are times when these sequences grow a little tiresome. That said, overall, the feature toys with some interesting concepts and Dunlop really makes excellent use of setting to reinforce the sense of isolation. The apartment feels so sparse, while the chilly exterior shots reinforce the coldness that exists within the recluse’s life, underscoring his desperation for some type of connection, especially a girlfriend."

== Awards ==
The film was nominated for the John Dunning Best First Feature Award at the 11th Canadian Screen Awards in 2023.
