= Wintergreen (film) =

2012 Canadian short film

- French: Paparmane
- Directed by: Joëlle Desjardins Paquette
- Written by: Joëlle Desjardins Paquette
- Produced by: Ménaïc Raoul
- Starring: Steve Laplante; Sophie Desmarais
- Cinematography: Mathieu Laverdière
- Edited by: Isabelle Malenfant
- Music by: Simon Leclerc
- Production company: Voyous Films
- Distributed by: 3.14 Collectif
- Release date: February 1, 2012 (Clermont-Ferrand)
- Running time: 19 minutes
- Country: Canada
- Language: French

Wintergreen (French: Paparmane) is a Canadian short comedy-drama film, directed by Joëlle Desjardins Paquette and released in 2012. The film centres on the interaction between Jérôme (Steve Laplante), a parking station attendant who has never emotionally recovered from the death of his mother, and Camille (Sophie Desmarais), a singing telegram performer, whose lives are transformed by an ailing cat.

The film premiered at the 2012 Clermont-Ferrand International Short Film Festival.

The film won the Golden Sheaf Award for Best Comedy at the 2012 Yorkton Film Festival, and was named to the Toronto International Film Festival's annual year-end Canada's Top Ten list for 2012.
