= Gabrielle Tougas-Fréchette =

Gabrielle Tougas-Fréchette is a Canadian film producer, currently associated with Voyelles Films. She is most noted as producer, alongside Ménaïc Raoul, of the films The Twentieth Century, which was a Canadian Screen Award nominee for Best Motion Picture at the 8th Canadian Screen Awards in 2020, and Without Havana (Sin la Habana), which was a Prix Iris nominee for Best Film at the 24th Quebec Cinema Awards in 2022.

She was also a producer, alongside Alexandre Dostie and Hany Ouichou, of the 2016 short film Mutants, which won the CSA for Best Live Action Short Drama at the 5th Canadian Screen Awards, and the Iris for Best Short Film at the 19th Quebec Cinema Awards.

Her other credits have included the films Where I Am (Là où je suis), With Jeff (Avec Jeff, à moto), Time Flies (Nous avions), Mynarski Death Plummet (Mynarski chute mortelle), Blue Thunder (Bleu tonnerre), The Heart of Madame Sabali (Le Cœur de Madame Sabali), All You Can Eat Buddha, Delphine, Nouveau Québec and So Long Pluto (Au revoir Pluton).

She has also had a number of credits as a costume designer, most notably receiving a CSA nomination for Best Costume Design at the 6th Canadian Screen Awards in 2018 for All You Can Eat Buddha.
