= Death Does Not Exist =

- French: La mort n'existe pas
- Directed by: Félix Dufour-Laperrière
- Written by: Félix Dufour-Laperrière
- Produced by: Félix Dufour-Laperrière; Nicolas Dufour-Laperrière; Pierre Baussaron; Emmanuel-Alain Raynal
- Starring: Karelle Tremblay; Barbara Ulrich; Zeneb Blanchet; Mattis Savard-Verhoeven; Irène Dufour
- Music by: Jean L'Appeau
- Production companies: Embuscade Films; Miyu
- Distributed by: Maison 4:3; UFO Distribution; Best Friend Forever
- Release date: May 15, 2025 (Cannes)
- Running time: 72 minutes
- Countries: Canada; France
- Language: French

Death Does Not Exist (French: La mort n'existe pas) is a 2025 animated drama film written and directed by Félix Dufour-Laperrière.

== Summary ==
The film centres on Hélène, an activist who abandons her colleagues after they fail in an armed attack against a wealthy target; isolated in the wilderness, she becomes haunted by Manon, a former member of the group who challenges Hélène to reconsider her values and convictions.

== Production ==
The film's voice cast includes Karelle Tremblay, Barbara Ulrich, Zeneb Blanchet, Mattis Savard-Verhoeven and Irène Dufour.

== Release ==
An excerpt from the film was screened as a work in progress at the 2024 Annecy International Animation Film Festival. The full film had its world premiere at the Directors Fortnight section of the 2025 Cannes Film Festival on May 15, 2025.

== Reception ==
Nikki Baughan of Screen Daily wrote that "there is a hallucinogenic quality to the painstakingly hand-drawn two-dimensional animation, whose simple appearance belies a wealth of detail. He uses a muted palette with pops of colour, and, while Hélène takes on the solid hues of her surroundings, Manon and Marc appear as ethereal outlines, blurring the boundary between character and backdrop."

For That Shelf, Courtney Small wrote that "arguably one of the most stunning animated works in recent years, there is much to like in this film. Death Does Not Exist may not provide answers to the questions it contemplates, but Dufour-Laperrière at least wants the viewers to get the conversation started. Most of us may not be afforded second chances like Hélène, but that doesn’t mean we cannot make the most of the one we have now. As the film alludes, the worst thing one can do in the face of inequality is nothing, which is a different type of murder.

== Accolades ==
Award / Film Festival	Date of ceremony	Category	Recipient(s)	Result	Ref.
Annecy International Animation Film Festival	14 June 2025	Cristal Award for Best Feature Film	Death Does Not Exist	Nominated	
Annecy International Animation Film Festival	14 June 2025	Pablo Pico Distinction	Jean L'Appeau	Won	
Ottawa International Animation Festival	27 September 2025	Best Feature Film	Death Does Not Exist	Won	
Association québécoise des critiques de cinéma	2026	Prix Luc-Perreault	Félix Dufour-Laperrière	Nominated	
