= Rodeo (2022 Canadian film) =

2022 film by Joëlle Desjardins Paquette

- French: Rodéo
- Directed by: Joëlle Desjardins Paquette
- Written by: Joëlle Desjardins Paquette; Sarah Lévesque
- Produced by: Sarah Mannering; Fanny Drew
- Starring: Maxime Le Flaguais; Lilou Roy-Lanouette
- Cinematography: Juliette A. Lossky
- Edited by: Elric Robichon
- Music by: Sei Nakauchi Pelletier
- Production company: Colonelle Films
- Distributed by: Entract Films
- Release date: November 8, 2022 (Cinemania)
- Running time: 80 minutes
- Country: Canada
- Language: French

Rodeo (French: Rodéo) is a 2022 Canadian drama film, directed and co-written by Joëlle Desjardins Paquette. The film stars Maxime Le Flaguais as Serge, a truck driver who takes his young daughter Lily (Lilou Roy-Lanouette) on a cross-Canada road trip to attend a truck rodeo in Alberta, against the context of a dispute with his ex-wife (Whitney Lafleur) over custody of her.

The film went into production in August 2021. Although not directly based on their real lives, the film was inspired in part by Desjardins Paquette's father, a professional truck mechanic with Kenworth's operations in Montreal.

The film premiered on November 8, 2022 at the Cinemania film festival. It later screened in the Borsos Competition at the 2022 Whistler Film Festival, with its commercial digital release on March 31, 2023.

== Awards ==
At Whistler, Desjardins Paquette won the award for Best Director of a Borsos Competition Film and Roy-Lanouette received an honourable mention for Best Performance in a Borsos Competition Film. It was also named the winner of the EDA Award for Best Female-Directed Feature Film by the Alliance of Women Film Journalists.

The film received two nominations at the 11th Canadian Screen Awards in 2023, for Best Lead Performance in a Film (Le Flaguais) and the John Dunning Best First Feature Award. It was a Prix Iris nominee for Best First Film at the 25th Quebec Cinema Awards.
