= The Cat in the Bag (1964 film) =

1964 film

- French: Le chat dans le sac
- Directed by: Gilles Groulx
- Written by: Gilles Groulx
- Produced by: Jacques Bobet
- Starring: Claude Godbout; Barbara Ulrich; Pierre Maheu; Jean V. Dufresne; Paul-Marie Lapointe; Jean-Paul Bernier; Manon Blain; André Leblanc; Véronique Vilbert
- Cinematography: Jean-Claude Labrecque
- Edited by: Gilles Groulx
- Music by: John Coltrane
- Production company: National Film Board of Canada
- Distributed by: Pathé Contemporary Films; Impact Films (US, subtitled)
- Release date: 1964
- Running time: 74 minutes
- Country: Canada
- Language: French
- Budget: $45,982

The Cat in the Bag (French: Le chat dans le sac) is a 1964 drama film by Gilles Groulx, which played a seminal role in the development of Quebec cinema. The film's themes, improvisational style, hand-held camera work and evocative music signalled the emergence of a new generation of Quebec films and filmmakers.

The film has mixed Direct Cinema documentary techniques and distancing devices similar to those employed by Jean-Luc Godard. The film tells the story of a young man's struggles to be accepted in Quebec society and Quebec's place in Canada. The protagonist, a journalist played by Claude Godbout, struggles with the question of whether to change society or accept it the way it is. He has a partner who is a Jewish Montrealer, an actress who runs a theater, but does not share the troubles and struggles with him. Claude leaves Montreal for the Quebec countryside to reflect on his life, and with the distance between them, their love fades.

== Cast ==
- Barbara Ulrich as Barbara
- Claude Godbout as Claude
- Manon Blain as Manon J'sais-pas-qui
- Véronique Vilbert as Véronique
- Jean-Paul Bernier as Jean-Paul
- André Leblanc as Toulouse
- Paul-Marie Lapointe as Messieurs – ont joué trois personages
- Jean-V. Dufresne as Messieurs – ont joué trois personages (as Jean V. Dufresne)
- Pierre Maheu as Messieurs – ont joué trois personages

== Production ==
In 1963, Gilles Groulx presented Grant McLean, the director of production at the National Film Board, with a film outline that did not even fill an entire page. The film was shot on a budget of $45,982 (equivalent to $460,381 in 2025).

== Critical response ==
Critic Robert Daudelin stated: "At last we were confronted by a film which really belonged to us, one in which we were happy to recognize ourselves and see ourselves close up. [It] was (and remains) the image of our most recent awakenings".

It received the Grand Prix at the 1964 Montreal International Film Festival. Le Chat dans le sac was identified as a "culturally significant film" by the AV Preservation Trust through the 2002 Masterworks programme. It was screened at the 18th Berlin Film Festival in 1968 as part of Young Canadian Film, a lineup of films by emerging Canadian filmmakers.

== Retrospectives ==
It was later screened at the 1984 Festival of Festivals as part of Front & Centre, a special retrospective program of artistically and culturally significant films from throughout the history of Canadian cinema.

It received a retrospective screening in the History of Cinema program at the 2025 Festival du nouveau cinéma, concurrently with the premiere of Ulrich's new documentary film Barbaracadabra.

== See also ==
- Blue World, a 2019 album featuring John Coltrane's recordings for this soundtrack

== Works cited ==
- Evans, Gary (1991). In the National Interest: A Chronicle of the National Film Board of Canada from 1949 to 1989. University of Toronto Press. ISBN 0802027849.
