= Danny Dunlop =

Canadian filmmaker

Danny Dunlop is a Canadian filmmaker from London, Ontario, whose debut feature film Wolves was released in 2022.

A graduate of Fanshawe College and the University of Western Ontario, Dunlop wrote and directed various short films, and had cinematography credits on films by other directors, prior to making Wolves. He launched his own production company, Black Wave, in 2012.

Wolves was nominated for the John Dunning Best First Feature Award at the 11th Canadian Screen Awards in 2023.
