= Sylvio Arriola =

French canadian actor from Quebec

- Born: Quebec, Canada
- Occupation: Actor
- Known for: All You Can Eat Buddha
- Awards: Nominated, Canadian Screen Award for Best Supporting Actor (2018)

Sylvio Arriola is a Canadian actor from Quebec with Latin American origin. He was nominated for best supporting actor at the Canadian Screen Awards (2018), for his performance in the film All You Can Eat Buddha.

== Filmography ==
=== Film ===
Year	Title	Role	Notes
2014	Stranger in a Cab	Client Café Beigne	Director :Patrick Gazé
2017	All You Can Eat Buddha	Valentino	Director : Ian Lagarde, Prod. Voyelles Film
2019	Guilt	Frédéric	Director: Onur Karaman
2021	Dans une semaine	Roberto Gutierrez Romano	Director: Roberto Zorfini
2022	Nouveau-Québec	Constable Raoul Giguère	Director: Sarah Fortin, Prod. Voyelles film
2022	La guerre nuptiale	Le baron	Director: Maxime Desruisseaux
2023	Jour de merde	Luc	Director: Kevin T.Landry Prod.La 115ième

=== Television ===
Year	Title	Role	Notes
2009	Chabotte et fille	Martin le livreur	Director: Jeremy Peter Allen
2012	19-2	Employé de l'école	Director : Podz
2014	Légendes urbaines	Le rescapé	
2015	Subito texto	Le policier	
2018	Plan B	Représentant funéraire	
2019	Ruptures	Manuel / Ami de Mireille	Director: Rafael Ouellet
2021	Les moments parfaits	Infirmier, oncologie	Director: François Bégin
2022	C'est comme ça que je t'aime 2	L'homme impatient	Director: Robin Aubert
2022	Dans ma tête, le retour	Psychologue	Director: Marc Charbonneau
2022	District 31	Michel Daoust	Director: Danièle Méthot
2024	Stat	Urologue	Director: Jean-Marc Piché
2024	À coeur battant 2	Médecin	Director: Louise Archambault
2024	L'oeil du cyclone 5	Conseiller financier	Director: Julie Hogue
2024	Empathie	Dr Sira	Director: Guillaume Lonergan
2023-2025	Sorcières	Jean-Denis Perron, psychiatre	Directors: Myriam Verreault, Ian Lagarde, Jeanne Leblanc, Sarah Pellerin Production Amalga
