= Ripe (2025 film) =

ripe
- Vietnamese: chín
- Directed by: Solara Thanh Bình Đặng
- Written by: Solara Thanh Bình Đặng
- Produced by: Nic Altobelli
- Starring: Hayley Ngọc Mai
- Cinematography: Chananun Chotrungroj
- Edited by: Lawrence Le Lam
- Music by: Veron Xio
- Production company: Naltobel Productions
- Release date: September 8, 2025 (TIFF)
- Running time: 19 minutes
- Country: Canada
- Language: Vietnamese

ripe (Vietnamese: chín) is a Canadian short drama film, directed by Solara Thanh Bình Đặng and released in 2025. The film stars Hayley Ngọc Mai as Lệ, a young woman in rural Vietnam who must decide whether or not to agree to an arranged marriage.

The cast also includes Samuel An, Cong Ninh Nguyen, Damien Cole, Vy Nhat Châu and Bao Tâm.

The film premiered at the 2025 Toronto International Film Festival, and was subsequently screened at the 2025 Vancouver International Film Festival and the 2025 Festival du nouveau cinéma. At FNC, it won a Special Mention in the National Short Film Competition.

The film was named to TIFF's annual year-end Canada's Top Ten list for 2025.
