= Affection Affection =

- Directed by: Maxime Matray; Alexia Walther
- Screenplay by: Maxime Matray; Alexia Walther
- Produced by: Emmanuel Chaumet
- Starring: Agathe Bonitzer; Nathalie Richard; Christophe Paou
- Cinematography: Pauline Sicard
- Edited by: Jeanne Sarfati
- Music by: Micha Vanony
- Production company: Ecce Films
- Distributed by: UFO Distribution
- Release date: 13 August 2025 (Locarno)
- Running time: 101 minutes
- Country: France
- Language: French

Affection Affection is a French drama film, directed by Maxime Matray and Alexia Walther and released in 2025. The film stars Agathe Bonitzer as Géraldine, a bureaucrat in the mayor's office of a small town on the Côte d'Azur who takes it upon herself to investigate the disappearance of the mayor Jérôme (Christophe Paou) and his daughter Kenza (Clémentine Kaul-Surdez), amid the context of Géraldine's own mother Rita (Nathalie Richard) returning to town for the first time since moving to Thailand 17 years earlier.

The cast also includes Marc Susini as Rita's friend Jean-Claude.

The film premiered on 13 August 2025 in the Filmmakers of the Present competition at the 78th Locarno Film Festival, and was screened in the International Competition at the 2025 Festival du nouveau cinéma.
