= John Dunning Best First Feature Award =

Special Canadian film award

- Country: Canada
- Presented by: Academy of Canadian Cinema & Television
- First award: 1993
- Currently held by: R. T. Thorne for 40 Acres (2025)
- Website: academy.ca/awards

The John Dunning Best First Feature Award is a special Canadian film award, presented by the Academy of Canadian Cinema and Television to the year's best feature film by a first-time film director. Under the earlier names Claude Jutra Award and Canadian Screen Award for Best First Feature, the award has been presented since the 14th Genie Awards in 1993.

Formerly a juried prize whose winner was announced in advance of the ceremony, the award is now presented as a conventional category with a full shortlist of nominees.

To date six films, The Confessional (Le Confessionnal), Atanarjuat: The Fast Runner, Away from Her, A Colony (Une colonie), Beans and Scarborough, have won both the Best First Feature and Best Picture awards in the same year; the directors of Le Confessionnal, Atanarjuat, Away from Her and Scarborough also won the award for Best Director for the same films.

Under current Academy rules introduced in 2024, the category has six nominees each year if the number of eligible submissions exceeds nine, but remains at five nominees if less than nine submissions are received.

== History ==
The award was originally named in memory of Claude Jutra, a Canadian film director who died in 1986. Formerly part of the Genie Awards ceremonies, the Claude Jutra Award was transitioned to be part of the new Canadian Screen Awards in 2013.

Following the February 2016 publication of Yves Lever's biography of Jutra, which contained allegations that Jutra had sexually abused underage children during his lifetime, the Academy announced that it was removing Jutra's name from the award. Québec Cinéma also removed Jutra's name from its Prix Jutra ceremonies on the same day.

Beginning with the 4th Canadian Screen Awards in 2016, the award was presented as the Canadian Screen Award for Best First Feature. In the same year the John Dunning Discovery Award, named in memory of film producer John Dunning, was introduced to honour microbudget films. Initially it was a separate award from the Best First Feature category, with the two awards presented alongside each other to different films, until the two awards were merged under the John Dunning Best First Feature Award name beginning with the 7th Canadian Screen Awards in 2019.

== Winners ==
=== Claude Jutra Award ===
Year	Film	Director	Ref
1993; 14th Genie Awards	The Grocer's Wife	John Pozer	
1994; 15th Genie Awards	Louis 19, King of the Airwaves (Louis 19, le roi des ondes)	Michel Poulette	
1995; 16th Genie Awards	The Confessional (Le Confessionnal)	Robert Lepage	
1996; 17th Genie Awards	Joe's So Mean to Josephine	Peter Wellington	
1997; 18th Genie Awards	The Hanging Garden	Thom Fitzgerald	
1998; 19th Genie Awards	Last Night	Don McKellar	
1999; 20th Genie Awards	Post Mortem	Louis Bélanger	
2000; 21st Genie Awards	The Left-Hand Side of the Fridge (La Moitié gauche du frigo)	Philippe Falardeau	
2001; 22nd Genie Awards	Atanarjuat: The Fast Runner	Zacharias Kunuk	
2002; 23rd Genie Awards	Flower & Garnet	Keith Behrman	
2003; 24th Genie Awards	How My Mother Gave Birth to Me During Menopause (Comment ma mère accoucha de moi durant sa ménopause)	Sébastien Rose	
2004; 25th Genie Awards	White Skin (La Peau blanche)	Daniel Roby	
2005; 26th Genie Awards	Familia	Louise Archambault	
2006; 27th Genie Awards	Eve and the Fire Horse	Julia Kwan	
2006; 27th Genie Awards	The Secret Life of Happy People (La Vie secrète des gens heureux)	Stéphane Lapointe	
2007; 28th Genie Awards	Away from Her	Sarah Polley	
2008; 29th Genie Awards	Everything Is Fine (Tout est parfait)	Yves Christian Fournier	
2009; 30th Genie Awards	I Killed My Mother (J'ai tué ma mère)	Xavier Dolan	
2010; 31st Genie Awards	Exit 67 (Sortie 67)	Jephté Bastien	
2011; 32nd Genie Awards	Nuit #1	Anne Émond	
2012; 1st Canadian Screen Awards	Blackbird	Jason Buxton	
2013; 2nd Canadian Screen Awards	Whitewash	Emanuel Hoss-Desmarais	
2014; 3rd Canadian Screen Awards	Bang Bang Baby	Jeffrey St. Jules	

=== Best First Feature ===
Year	Film	Director	Ref
2015; 4th Canadian Screen Awards	River	Jamie M. Dagg	
2016; 5th Canadian Screen Awards	Old Stone	Johnny Ma	
2017; 6th Canadian Screen Awards	Ava	Sadaf Foroughi	

=== John Dunning Discovery Award ===
Year	Film	Director	Ref
2015; 4th Canadian Screen Awards
2015; 4th Canadian Screen Awards	Mina Walking	Yosef Baraki	
2016; 5th Canadian Screen Awards
2016; 5th Canadian Screen Awards	The Lockpicker	Randall Okita	
2017; 6th Canadian Screen Awards
2017; 6th Canadian Screen Awards	Black Cop	Cory Bowles	
2017; 6th Canadian Screen Awards	The Devout	Connor Gaston	
2017; 6th Canadian Screen Awards	Wexford Plaza	Joyce Wong	

=== John Dunning Best First Feature Award ===
Year	Film	Director	Ref
2018; 7th Canadian Screen Awards
2018; 7th Canadian Screen Awards	A Colony (Une colonie)	Geneviève Dulude-De Celles	
2018; 7th Canadian Screen Awards	Family First (Chien de garde)	Sophie Dupuis	
2018; 7th Canadian Screen Awards	Firecrackers	Jasmin Mozaffari	
2018; 7th Canadian Screen Awards	The Nest (Le nid)	David Paradis	
2018; 7th Canadian Screen Awards	Touched	Karl R. Hearne	
2019; 8th Canadian Screen Awards
2019; 8th Canadian Screen Awards	Murmur	Heather Young	
2019; 8th Canadian Screen Awards	Black Conflux	Nicole Dorsey	
2019; 8th Canadian Screen Awards	Mad Dog Labine	Jonathan Beaulieu-Cyr, Renaud Lessard	
2019; 8th Canadian Screen Awards	Sympathy for the Devil (Sympathie pour le diable)	Guillaume de Fontenay	
2019; 8th Canadian Screen Awards	The Twentieth Century	Matthew Rankin	
2020; 9th Canadian Screen Awards
2020; 9th Canadian Screen Awards	Beans	Tracey Deer	
2020; 9th Canadian Screen Awards	The Kid Detective	Evan Morgan	
2020; 9th Canadian Screen Awards	Tito	Grace Glowicki	
2020; 9th Canadian Screen Awards	Vacarme	Neegan Trudel	
2020; 9th Canadian Screen Awards	Violation	Madeleine Sims-Fewer, Dusty Mancinelli	
2021; 10th Canadian Screen Awards
2021; 10th Canadian Screen Awards	Scarborough	Shasha Nakhai, Rich Williamson	
2021; 10th Canadian Screen Awards	Islands	Martin Edralin	
2021; 10th Canadian Screen Awards	Night Raiders	Danis Goulet	
2021; 10th Canadian Screen Awards	The Noise of Engines (Le Bruit des moteurs)	Philippe Grégoire	
2021; 10th Canadian Screen Awards	Without Havana (Sin la Habana)	Kaveh Nabatian	
2022; 11th Canadian Screen Awards
2022; 11th Canadian Screen Awards	Falcon Lake	Charlotte Le Bon	
2022; 11th Canadian Screen Awards	The Maiden	Graham Foy	
2022; 11th Canadian Screen Awards	Noemie Says Yes (Noémie dit oui)	Geneviève Albert	
2022; 11th Canadian Screen Awards	Rodeo (Rodéo)	Joëlle Desjardins Paquette	
2022; 11th Canadian Screen Awards	Wolves	Danny Dunlop	
2023; 12th Canadian Screen Awards
2023; 12th Canadian Screen Awards	In Flames	Zarrar Kahn	
2023; 12th Canadian Screen Awards	Humanist Vampire Seeking Consenting Suicidal Person (Vampire humaniste cherche suicidaire consentant)	Ariane Louis-Seize	
2023; 12th Canadian Screen Awards	Kanaval	Henri Pardo	
2023; 12th Canadian Screen Awards	Richelieu	Pier-Philippe Chevigny	
2023; 12th Canadian Screen Awards	Something You Said Last Night	Luis De Filippis	
2023; 12th Canadian Screen Awards	Through the Night (Quitter la nuit)	Delphine Girard	
2024; 13th Canadian Screen Awards
2024; 13th Canadian Screen Awards	Village Keeper	Karen Chapman	
2024; 13th Canadian Screen Awards	Deaner '89	Sam McGlynn	
2024; 13th Canadian Screen Awards	Hunting Daze (Jour de chasse)	Annick Blanc	
2024; 13th Canadian Screen Awards	Mongrels	Jerome Yoo	
2024; 13th Canadian Screen Awards	Seeds	Kaniehtiio Horn	
2024; 13th Canadian Screen Awards	Who Do I Belong To	Meryam Joobeur	
2025; 14th Canadian Screen Awards
2025; 14th Canadian Screen Awards	40 Acres	R. T. Thorne	
2025; 14th Canadian Screen Awards	100 Sunset	Kunsang Kyirong	
2025; 14th Canadian Screen Awards	Blue Heron	Sophy Romvari	
2025; 14th Canadian Screen Awards	Dinner with Friends	Sasha Leigh Henry	
2025; 14th Canadian Screen Awards	Follies (Folichonneries)	Éric K. Boulianne	
2025; 14th Canadian Screen Awards	Where Souls Go (Où vont les âmes?)	Brigitte Poupart	

== See also ==
- Prix Iris for Best First Film
- Toronto International Film Festival Award for Best Canadian First Feature Film
