= Mad Dog Labine =

- Directed by: Jonathan Beaulieu-Cyr; Renaud Lessard
- Written by: Jonathan Beaulieu-Cyr; Renaud Lessard
- Produced by: Fanny Forest; Ariane Falardeau St-Amour; Jonathan Beaulieu-Cyr; Renaud Lessard
- Starring: Ève-Marie Martin; Zoé Audet; Charlotte Aubin; Emmanuel Bilodeau
- Cinematography: Ariane Falardeau St-Amour
- Edited by: Paul Chotel
- Production company: Rococoeur
- Distributed by: Maison 4:3
- Release date: October 9, 2018 (FNCM)
- Running time: 85 minutes
- Country: Canada
- Language: French
- Budget: CA$150,000

Mad Dog Labine is a Canadian docufiction film, directed by Jonathan Beaulieu-Cyr and Renaud Lessard and released in 2018. Set in the rural Pontiac region of western Quebec, the film stars Ève-Marie Martin as Lindsay Labine, a young girl who is feeling alienated because her father would not take her hunting with her older brothers; hanging out with her friend Justine (Zoé Audet), the girls' lives may be transformed when they unexpectedly find an abandoned winning lottery ticket.

The film's cast also includes Charlotte Aubin, Emmanuel Bilodeau, Sarah-Jeanne Labrosse, Antoine Pilon, Sébastien Ricard, Barbara Ulrich and Julianne Côté.

The film premiered in October 2018 at the Festival du nouveau cinéma, and won the Grand Prix Focus Quebec/Canada. It went into general theatrical release in 2019.

The film was a nominee for the John Dunning Best First Feature Award at the 8th Canadian Screen Awards, and for the Prix Iris for Best First Film at the 22nd Quebec Cinema Awards.
