= My Stepmother Is a Witch =

- French: Ma belle-mère est une sorcière
- Directed by: Joëlle Desjardins Paquette
- Written by: Dominic James; Christine Doyon
- Produced by: Antonello Cozzolino; Dominic James; Brigitte Léveillé
- Starring: Juliette Aubé; Pierre-Yves Cardinal; Marilyn Castonguay; Marc-André Leclair
- Cinematography: Barry Russell
- Edited by: François Larochelle
- Music by: Sei Nakauchi Pelletier
- Production companies: Les Productions La Fête; Attraction Images
- Distributed by: TVA Films
- Release date: September 30, 2025 (Schlingel)
- Running time: 80 minutes
- Country: Canada
- Language: Quebec French

My Stepmother Is a Witch (French: Ma belle-mère est une sorcière) is a Canadian children's comedy film, directed by Joëlle Desjardins Paquette and released in 2025. The film stars Juliette Aubé as Margot Rivard, a young girl living with her father Marcel (Pierre-Yves Cardinal) after her parents have separated, who becomes convinced that her new stepmother Jeanne Sabourin (Marilyn Castonguay) is a witch, and turns to occultist Miss Dalloway (Marc-André Leclair) for help reuniting her family.

The cast also includes Étienne Cardin, Milya Corbeil Gauvreau, Anaïs Céus, Lily Thibeault, Rémi Prévost and Claire Pimparé in supporting roles.

== Production ==
The 27th film in the Tales for All series of children's films, the film was shot in spring 2025 in and around Montreal.

== Release ==
The film premiered at the Schlingel International Film Festival for Children and Young Audiences on September 30, 2025, before opening commercially in Quebec on October 10.

It surpassed the $1 million mark for success at the Quebec box office in its first month of release.
