= Marie-Ève Juste =

Canadian film director

Marie-Ève Juste is a Canadian film director from Quebec. Her 2012 short film With Jeff (Avec Jeff, à moto) premiered in the Director's Fortnight at the 2012 Cannes Film Festival, and was a shortlisted Prix Jutra nominee for Best Live Action Short Drama at the 15th Jutra Awards in 2013.

Her other short films include Summer Day (Canicule), The Sands (Plage de sable), A New Year (Le nouvel an) and As Spring Comes (Comme la neige au printemps).
