= Yonah Acosta =

Cuban actor and dancer

Yonah Acosta Gonzales, usually credited as Yonah Acosta, is a Cuban actor and ballet dancer. He is most noted for his performance in the 2020 film Without Havana (Sin la Habana), for which he received a Prix Iris nomination for Revelation of the Year at the 24th Quebec Cinema Awards.

He is the nephew of dancer and director of the Birmingham Royal Ballet, Carlos Acosta, he has danced with the Cuban National Ballet, the English National Ballet and the Bayerisches Staatsballett.
