= Festival International de Films de Montréal =

Festival International de Films de Montréal (FIFM), also known as the New Montreal FilmFest, was a film festival held in Montreal in 2005 to focus on Francophone films. Originally intended as an annual event, the festival became mired in rivalry with two competing festivals—the Montreal World Film Festival and the Toronto International Film Festival—such that the New Montreal FilmFest was ultimately held only once.

== History ==
Festival International de Films de Montréal (FIFM), also known as the New Montreal FilmFest in English, was founded after a year-long dispute between the funding agencies SODEC and Telefilm Canada and the organizers of the Montreal World Film Festival (WFF)—Festival des Films du Monde - Montréal (FFM)—in 2004. These two former sponsors of the FFM/WFF called for proposals for a new film festival and ultimately shifted their funding to the New Montreal FilmFest, which was inaugurated in October 2005.

The New Montreal FilmFest, produced by Spectra Entertainment (owners of the Montreal Spectrum theater), was initially headed by Daniel Langlois, founder of SoftImage and Ex-Centris. Langlois had previously directed the Montreal Festival of New Cinema and New Media—Festival de Nouveau Cinema et Nouveaux Media, which was renamed Festival du Nouveau Cinéma in 2004 (Montreal's independent film festival). The involvement of Langlois intended to counter prior criticisms of lack of professionalism in the FFM/WFF (run by Serge Losique) and to merge the FCMM (renamed the FNC in 2004) and the New Montreal FilmFest into one new festival. The FNC would not agree to such a merger, and scheduling conflicts between the New Montreal FilmFest and the FNC led to Langlois' early departure from FilmFest.

The 2005 event was eventually directed by Moritz de Hadeln, who had previously headed the Locarno International Film Festival, the Berlin International Film Festival, the Venice International Film Festival—and founded the Visions du Réel documentary film festival of Nyon, Switzerland. Moritz de Hadeln had also been a long-time rival of Serge Losique's. Alain Simard was president of the festival in 2005.

FilmFest officials decided to concentrate on Francophone films, to differentiate from the Toronto International Film Festival's focus on Hollywood films, and world cinema of Serge Losique's festival. However, the 2005 inaugural New Montreal FilmFest came under criticism before the event, and did not meet expectations. The advance negative publicity and its timing and selection of films were criticized widely, resulting in poor ticket sales. In early 2006 the New Montreal FilmFest was terminated, after it had lost $850,000. Losique called for a public inquiry into its failure.

== See also ==
- Festival du Nouveau Cinéma (FNC), formerly Festival of New Cinema and New Media (FCMM)
- Montreal World Film Festival (FFM)
- Fantasia International Film Festival (FanTasia)
- Montreal International Jazz Festival (FIJM)
