= Ian Lagarde =

Canadian cinematographer and film director

Ian Lagarde is a Canadian cinematographer and film director. He is most noted for his 2017 film All You Can Eat Buddha, for which he received a Canadian Screen Award nomination for Best Director at the 6th Canadian Screen Awards and a nomination for the Directors Guild of Canada's DGC Discovery Award.

He previously directed a number of short films, including Vent solaire and Éclat du jour, as well as an episode of the television documentary series The Nature of Things. His credits as a cinematographer have included the films Vic and Flo Saw a Bear (Vic + Flo ont vu un ours), The Heart of Madame Sabali (Le cœur de Madame Sabali) and For Those Who Don't Read Me (À tous ceux qui ne me lisent pas).
