= Evergon =

Canadian artist (born 1946)

- Born: Albert Jay Lunt; 1946 (age 79–80); Niagara Falls, Ontario, Canada
- Education: Mount Allison University BFA Rochester Institute of Technology MFA
- Known for: photographer, teacher, activist

Evergon (born Albert Jay Lunt, 1946), also known by the names of his alter-egos Celluloso Evergoni, Egon Brut, and Eve R. Gonzales, is a Canadian artist, teacher and activist. Throughout his career, his work has explored photography and its related forms, including photo-collage, instant photography (discontinued Polaroid), colour photocopying, and holography.

== Career ==
Evergon was born in Niagara Falls, Ontario, Canada, studied at Mount Allison University and graduated with a master's degree in fine arts from the Rochester Institute of Technology in 1974.

From the mid-1970s until 1999, Evergon taught in the fine arts program at the University of Ottawa. It was during this time that he established his reputation locally, nationally, and internationally.

He taught at the University of Ottawa; Emily Carr School of Art, Vancouver, BC; Brock University, St. Catharines; the Ontario College of Art, Toronto; School of the Art Institute of Chicago, Chicago, IL; Bradford College and the National Museum of Photography, Film and Television, West Yorkshire, England. He retired in 2015 after being Associate Professor of Photography at Concordia University in Montreal, Quebec since 1999. He currently lives and works in Montreal and is a professor emeritus at Concordia University.

== Work ==
Major themes in Evergon's work include personal sexuality, gender construction, aging, and body image. Evergon has described his work as homoerotic and pornographic. His work frequently includes art historical references as well as questioning accepted interpretations of certain canonical art. He was among the artists of the 1960s and 1970s who reacted against of the conventions of studio photography established through the post-World War II period. Since the mid-to late 1970s, he has explored photographic technology in his work.

== Selected exhibitions ==
In 1988, the Canadian Museum of Contemporary Photography organized a major retrospective of his work, Evergon: 1971-1987, which was exhibited at the National Gallery of Canada and toured nationally and internationally. In 1994 Evergon was the subjecto of a major solo show at the Ottawa Art Gallery. Through his 1996 five-month residency at the Bradford Photography Fellowship, Evergon exhibited a major solo retrospective at the UK-based National Museum of Photography, Film & Television, which was accompanied by an Evergon 1987-1997 catalogue. In 2022, the Musée national des beaux-arts du Québec presented a major retrospective of his work titled Evergon:Theatres of the Intimate which featured 230 works.

== Selected public collections ==
His work is included in many public collections, including the Canadian Museum of Contemporary Photography; the National Gallery of Canada; the Beaverbrook Art Gallery; Edmonton Art Gallery; the Owens Art Gallery, Sackville, NB; the Agnes Etherington Art Centre, Kingston, ON; Musée d'art contemporain de Montréal; the Art Institute of Chicago; the International Center of Photography, NY; George Eastman House, Rochester, NY; the Polaroid International Collection, Frankfurt, Germany; Musée de l'Élysée, Lausanne; and many others.

== Awards ==
Evergon's work has been recognized with awards from the Canada Council and Petro-Canada. In 1986, he was the recipient of the Canada Council's Victor Martyn Lynch-Staunton Award for his work with large format photography and in 1990 he received the Petro-Canada's Art and Technology Award for his work in holography.

Awarded the 2023 Governor General's Award in Visual and Media Arts for Artistic Achievement.
