= Renaud Lessard =

Canadian film director from Quebec

Renaud Lessard is a Canadian film director from Quebec. He is most noted as co-director with Jonathan Beaulieu-Cyr of the 2018 film Mad Dog Labine, which was a nominee for the John Dunning Best First Feature Award at the 8th Canadian Screen Awards, and for the Prix Iris for Best First Film at the 22nd Quebec Cinema Awards.

Along with his brother Jérôme, he is a partner in KEB Papier, a rolling paper company which is one of the primary suppliers to the provincial Société québécoise du cannabis.

Originally from Aylmer, Quebec, he is a graduate of the Mel Hoppenheim School of Cinema at Concordia University.

He collaborated with Barbara Ulrich on the 2025 film Barbaracadabra, a comedic documentary about Ulrich grappling with her desire to add film directing to her résumé late in life. The film premiered in the National Competition at the 2025 Festival du nouveau cinéma.
