= Jephté Bastien =

Canadian film director

Jephté Bastien is a Canadian film director. His debut film, Sortie 67, won the Claude Jutra Award for best feature film by a first-time film director at the 31st Genie Awards in 2011.

Born in Haiti, Bastien is based in Montreal.
