= All You Can Eat Buddha =

2017 film

- Film poster
- Directed by: Ian Lagarde
- Written by: Ian Lagarde
- Produced by: Gabrielle Tougas-Fréchette
- Starring: David La Haye; Sylvio Arriola
- Edited by: Mathieu Grondin
- Release date: 11 September 2017 (TIFF)
- Running time: 85 minutes
- Country: Canada
- Language: French

All You Can Eat Buddha is a 2017 French-language Canadian fantasy black comedy film directed by Ian Lagarde, who also wrote the screenplay. It was screened in the Discovery section at the 2017 Toronto International Film Festival. The film centres on Mike, a mysterious guest at a vacation resort in Cuba who appears to have the ability to perform miracles.

== Cast ==
- David La Haye as Jean-Pierre Villeneuve / J-P Newtown
- Richard Jutras as Bert
- Ludovic Berthillot as Mike
- Sylvio Arriola as Valentino
- Yaité Ruiz as Esmeralda
- Alexander Guerrero as Santiago

== Accolades ==
The film received six Canadian Screen Award nominations at the 6th Canadian Screen Awards in 2018.

Award	Date of ceremony	Category	Recipient(s)	Result	Ref(s)
Directors Guild of Canada	2017	DGC Discovery Award	Ian Lagarde	Nominated	
Canadian Screen Awards	11 March 2018	Best Director	Ian Lagarde	Nominated	
Canadian Screen Awards	11 March 2018	Best Supporting Actor	Sylvio Arriola	Nominated	
Canadian Screen Awards	11 March 2018	Best Costume Design	Gabrielle Tougas-Fréchette	Nominated	
Canadian Screen Awards	11 March 2018	Best Sound	Sylvain Bellemare, Jean-Sébastien Beaudoin Gagnon, Hans Laitres	Nominated	
Canadian Screen Awards	11 March 2018	Best Sound Editing	Sylvain Bellemare, Claire Pochon, Simon Meilleur	Nominated	
Canadian Screen Awards	11 March 2018	Best Make-Up	Bruno Gatien	Nominated	
Prix Iris	3 June 2018	Best Sound	Jean-Sébastien Beaudoin Gagnon, Sylvain Bellemare, Hans Laitres	Nominated	
Prix Iris	3 June 2018	Most Successful Film Outside Quebec	Ian Lagarde	Nominated	
Prix Iris	3 June 2018	Best Make-Up	Bruno Gatien	Nominated	
Vancouver Film Critics Circle	18 December 2017	Best Supporting Actress in a Canadian Film	Yaité Ruiz	Nominated	
