= Joëlle Desjardins Paquette =

Canadian film director and screenwriter

- Born: Quebec
- Occupations: film director and screenwriter
- Known for: the Borsos Competition award for Best Director of a Borsos Competition Film at the 2022 Whistler Film Festival

Joëlle Desjardins Paquette is a Canadian film director and screenwriter from Quebec, who won the Borsos Competition award for Best Director of a Borsos Competition Film at the 2022 Whistler Film Festival for her 2022 film Rodeo (Rodéo). The film was subsequently nominated for the John Dunning Best First Feature Award at the 11th Canadian Screen Awards in 2023.

She previously directed a number of short films, as well as television and webseries episodes. Her 2012 short Wintergreen (Paparmane) was named to the Toronto International Film Festival's annual year-end Canada's Top Ten list in 2012.

She directed My Stepmother Is a Witch (Ma belle-mère est une sorcière), a children's film in the Tales for All series which was released in fall 2025.

== Filmography ==
- Timbré – 2007
- Wintergreen (Paparmane) – 2012
- Apnées – 2012
- Voir le ciel – 2012
- Sans dehors ni dedans – 2015
- Beyond Blue Waves (Flots gris) – 2016
- Rodeo (Rodéo) – 2022
- My Stepmother Is a Witch (Ma belle-mère est une sorcière) - 2025
