= Les Percéides =

Les Percéides is a film festival, staged annually in Percé, Quebec, Canada. The festival's name blends the town's name with the Perseids meteor shower (perséides in French), reflecting both the event's timing in August right around the time that the Perseids normally appear, and the fact that the festival's centrepiece event is a gala screening under the night sky at the town's public beach.

Other than the outdoor gala, films at the festival are normally screened at the Centre d'art de Percé and the La Vieille Usine arts centre. Due to the COVID-19 pandemic in Canada, the 2020 festival was staged entirely outdoors, taking place at the Paradiso de Petit-Pabos drive-in theatre in nearby Petit-Pabos, although all films screened at the festival were also made available online from the festival's website for 24 hours after the screening.

The festival was launched in 2009.

Beginning in its second year, the festival presents a number of annual awards. Winners of its grand prize have included Xavier Dolan's Heartbeats (Les amours imaginaires) in 2010, Rebecca Zlotowski's Dear Prudence (Belle Épine) in 2011, Simon Lavoie and Mathieu Denis's Laurentia (Laurentie) in 2012, Chloé Zhao's The Rider in 2018, Benedikt Erlingsson's Woman at War in 2019, and Hlynur Pálmason's A White, White Day in 2020.
