= Yan Giroux =

Canadian film director and screenwriter

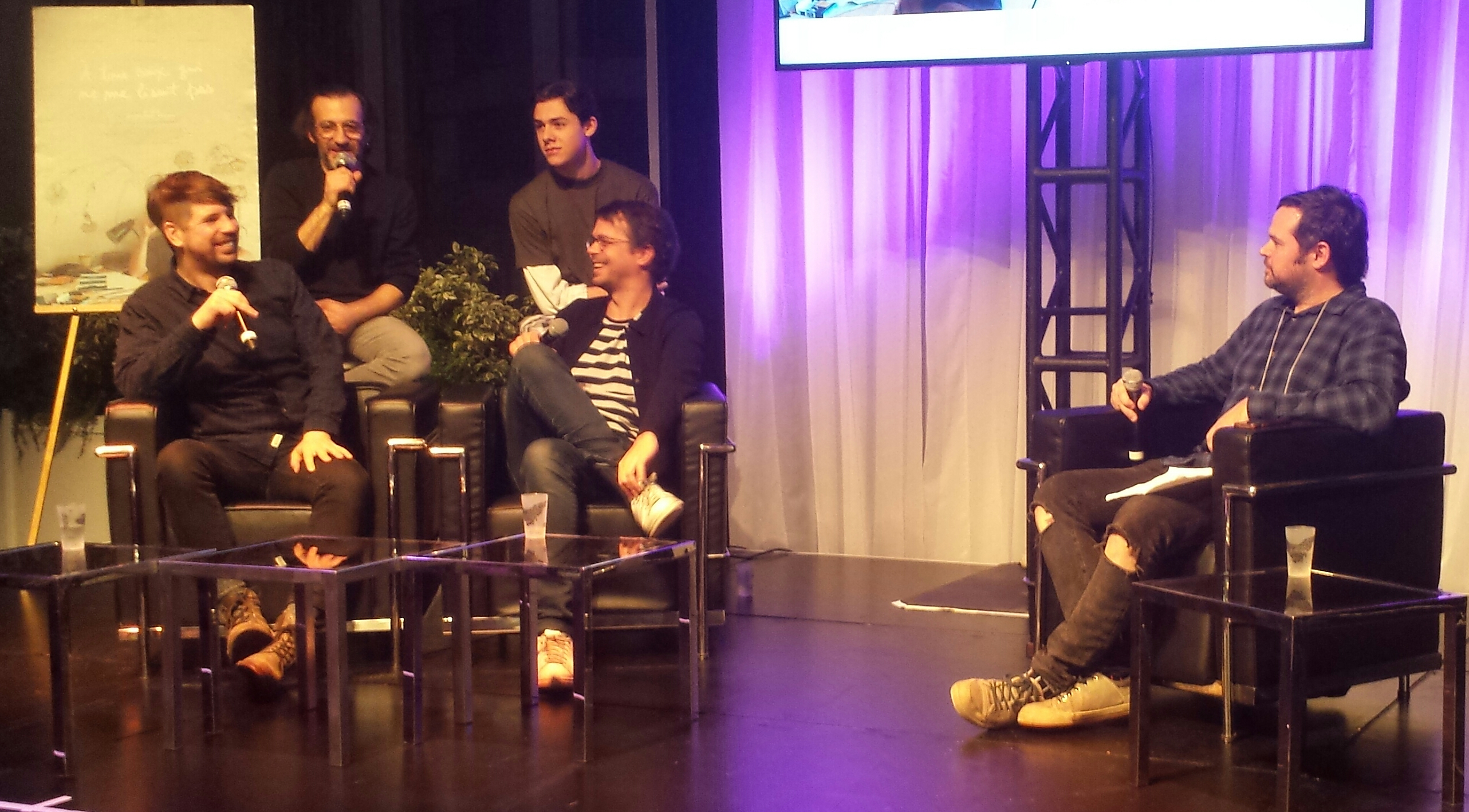
- Sébastien Dulude, Yan Giroux, Guillaume Corbeil, Martin Dubreuil and Henri Picard at the Salon du livre de Montréal 2018.
- Occupation(s): Director, Screenwriter
- Years active: 2007-present
- Notable work: For Those Who Don't Read Me

Yan Giroux is a Canadian film director and screenwriter. He won the Prix Iris for Best Screenplay, and was a nominee for Best Director, for his film For Those Who Don't Read Me (À tous ceux qui ne me lisent pas) at the 21st Quebec Cinema Awards in 2019.

He previously directed the short films Il faut que je parle à mon père (2007), Juste deux minutes (2010), Surveillant (2012), Mi nina mi vida (2014) and Lost Paradise Lost (2017), the documentary films Cubanos: Life and Death of a Revolution (2007), Elegant (2009) and Français: Un 14 juillet à Marseille (2011), and music videos for Malajube.

His 2025 film My Son Came Back to Disappear (Mon fils ne revint que sept jours), an adaptation of the novel by David Clerson, premiered at the 2025 Atlantic International Film Festival. In the same year, he was also announced as directing a forthcoming adaptation of Sébastien Dulude's novel Amiante.
