= Institut national de l'image et du son =

Film school in Montreal, Canada

Coordinates: 45°30′N 73°33′W

The Institut national de l'image et du son (French pronunciation: [ɛ̃stity nɑsjɔnal də limaʒ e dy sɔ̃]; INIS) is a training institute for film and television creation located in Montreal, Quebec. The institute was incorporated as a non-profit organization in 1990 and began operations in 1996.

L'inis is located adjacent to the Cinémathèque québécoise.

One of his founder is Quebec filmmaker Fernand Dansereau.

Some famous alumni includes Anaïs Barbeau-Lavalette, Matthew Rankin, Arianne Louis-Seize, Chloé Robichaud, Maryse Latendresse, Christine Doyon, Jeanne-Marie Poulain, Antonello Cozzolino, Guillaume Lambert, Émilie Perreault, Yan Lanouette Turgeon, Guillaume Lonergan, Germain Larochelle, Stéphane Moukarzel, Marie-Josée Ouellet, Eli Jean Tahchi, Anick Lemay, Luis Oliva, Fabien Dupuis, Élaine Hébert, Virginia Tangvald and many others.
