= Société de développement des entreprises culturelles =

Government agency in Quebec, Canada

The Société de Développement des Entreprises Culturelles (French pronunciation: [sɔsjete də devlɔpmɑ̃ dez‿ɑ̃tʁəpʁiz kyltyʁɛl], Society for the Development of Cultural Enterprises, abbr. SODEC) is a Quebec government agency founded in 1983 under the name of Société Générale du Cinéma du Québec (General Society of Cinema of Quebec, SGCQ). The latter is responsible to the Ministry of Culture and Communications (Ministère de la Culture et des Communications).

As a cultural enterprise development organization, SODEC has the mission of promoting and supporting culture in Quebec and abroad, including film and television production, books, crafts, the art market, and music. It is SODEC's mandate to preserve and enhance 32 buildings illustrating the identity of Quebec.

== History ==
- 1961 - Creation of the Ministère des Affaires Culturelles (Ministry of Cultural Affairs) (MAC)
- 1975 - Creation of the Institut Québécois du Cinéma (Quebec Institute of Cinema) (IQC)
- 1978 - Adoption of a white paper setting forth a proposed Quebec cultural development policy, presented by Camille Laurin
- 1978 - Creation of the Société de Développement des Industries de la Culture (Cultural Industries Development Corporation) (SODIC)
- 1982 - Creation of the Société de Développement des Industries de la Culture et des Communications (Culture and Communications Industries Development Corporation) (SODICC)
- 1983 - Creation of the Société Générale du Cinéma du Québec (General Society of Cinema of Quebec) (SGC) from the IQC
- 1988 - Creation of the Société Générale des Industries Culturelles (General Society of Cultural Industries) (SOGIC) from SODIC
- 1989 - Transfer of management of real estate
- 1992 - The Government of Quebec adopts a Cultural Policy
- 1995 - Creation of the Société de développement des entreprises culturelles (Society for the Development of Cultural Enterprises) (SODEC) resulting from the merger of SOGIC and IQC under the Act respecting the Society for the Development of Cultural Enterprises

== See also ==
- Telefilm Canada
- National Film Board
