= Festival du nouveau cinéma =

Annual film festival held in Montreal, Canada

Coordinates: 45°30′23″N 73°34′4″W

Festival du nouveau cinéma de Montréal
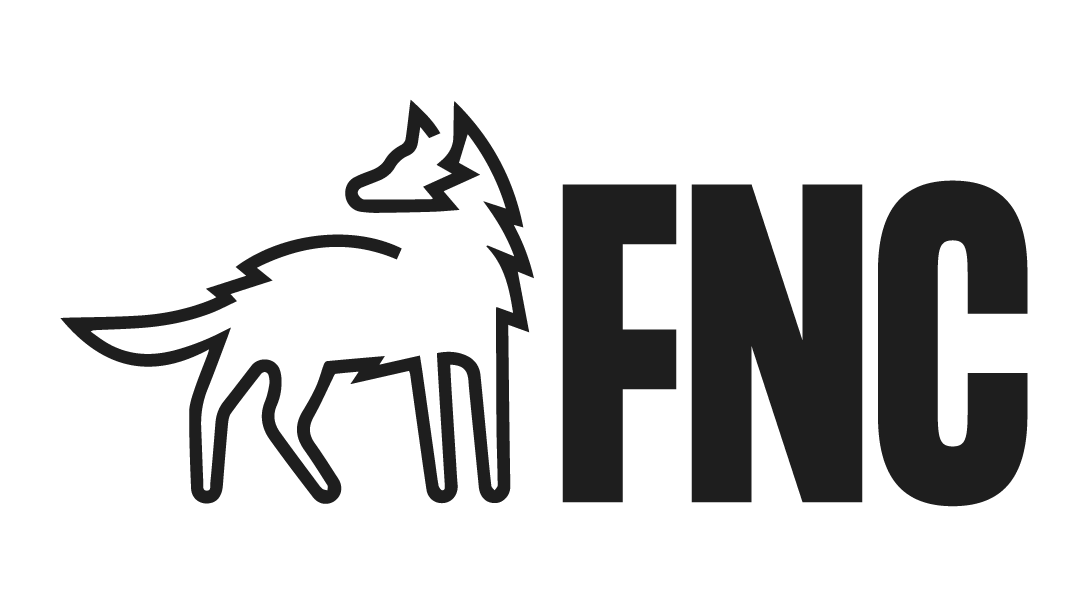

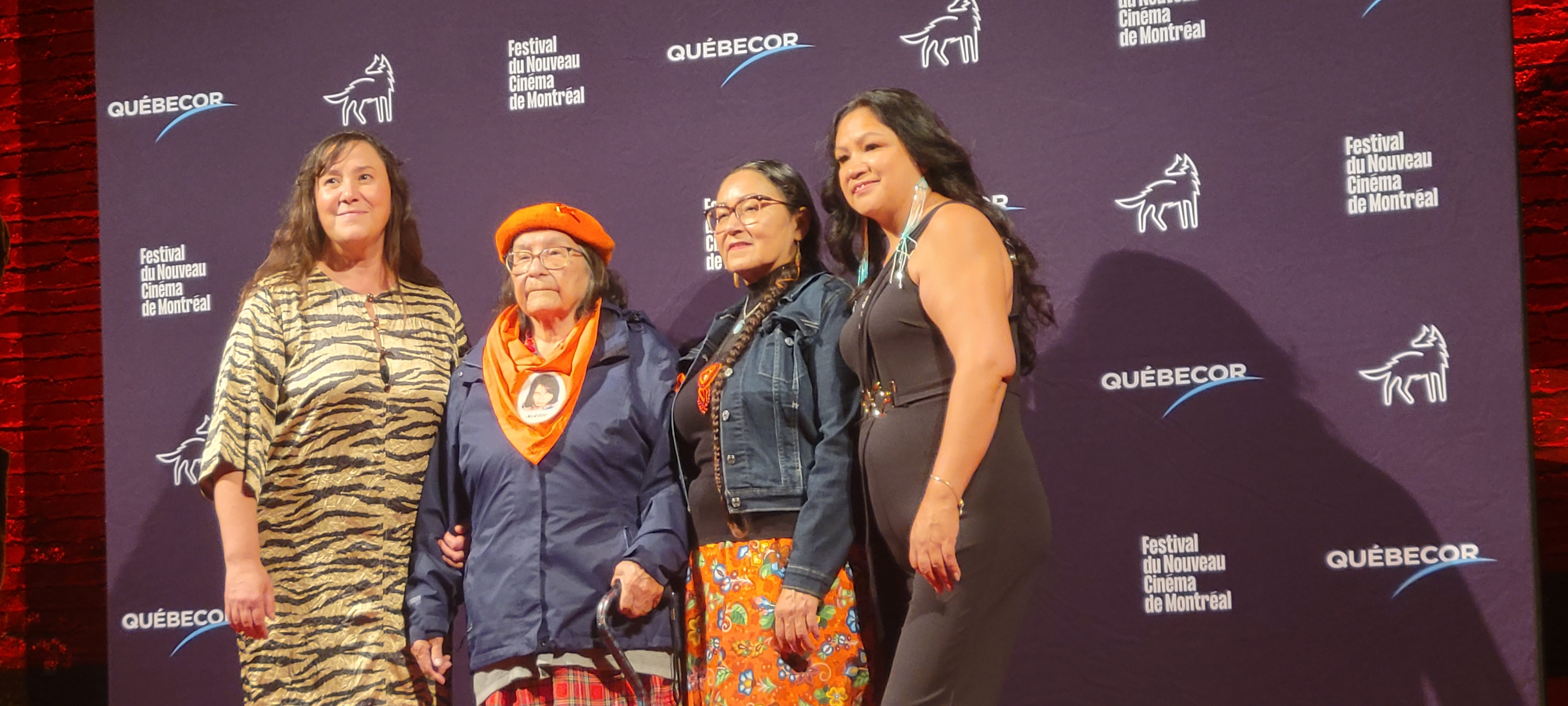
- World premiere of Atikamekw Suns at the 52nd Festival du nouveau cinéma (2023)
- Location: Montreal, Quebec; Canada
- Founded: 1971
- Most recent: 2025
- Festival date: October 8–19, 2025
- Website: nouveaucinema.ca

The Festival du nouveau cinéma or FNC (transl. "Festival of New Cinema") is an annual independent film festival held in Montreal, Quebec, Canada, featuring independent films from around the world. Founded in 1971, it is the oldest still-operating film festival in Canada.

Although the festival screens a variety of films by both new and established filmmakers, its core programs are the national and international competitions, which present a variety of awards for both feature and short films by emerging Canadian and international directors.

The festival is currently led by Zoé Protat as artistic director, and Ariane Bélanger as administrative director.

== History ==
Founded in 1971 as the Festival international du cinéma en 16mm de Montréal, the festival welcomes Québécois, Canadian, and international filmmakers, and encourages exchanges between industry professionals and the general public. It was a small underground film festival until the 1990s, when it began to gain prominence as an alternative to the Montreal World Film Festival due to increased public dissatisfaction with the management of the larger event.

It is now the primary general interest film festival in Montreal, with the more genre-oriented Fantasia International Film Festival serving as the city's other major annual film event, although the two festivals have undertaken various efforts to collaborate, rather than treating each other as competition, due to their distinct programming mandates. The press have, however, sometimes continued to lament the fact that the Festival du nouveau cinéma does not have the same level of international prominence that Montreal World had in its heyday or that the Toronto International Film Festival still enjoys, asserting that some of the city's smaller specialist film festivals, including Cinemania for Canadian and international francophone films and the Rendez-vous Québec Cinéma for Quebec films, still draw away from some of the potential of FNC and Fantasia to expand their profiles.

Over its history, it has introduced audiences to filmmakers such as François Girard, Atom Egoyan, Denis Villeneuve, Guy Maddin, Léa Pool, Jim Jarmusch, Abbas Kiarostami, Spike Lee, Wim Wenders, Raymond Depardon, Jane Campion, Pedro Almodóvar, Wong Kar-wai, Peter Greenaway, Chantal Akerman and Marguerite Duras.

In 2026, the festival gained accreditation from FIAPF. In the same year, the FNC and the Queer Palm, the independent award for LGBTQ-themed films screening at the Cannes Film Festival, collaborated on the creation and launch of a new Queer Louve award for LGBTQ-themed films at the FNC.

== Sections ==
- Compétition internationale highlighting the unique perspectives of the filmmakers who will shape tomorrow's cinema
- Compétition nationale, homegrown Canadian cinema
- Temps Ø, the wild bunch or bold cinematic rebels and adventurous films
- Incontournables, the greatest names in cinema
- Les Nouveaux alchimistes, a selection of films pushing the limits, breaking the rules and exploring the boundless creative potential that the medium offers
- Panorama international, international feature films
- Histoire(s) du cinéma, look-backs on the works that have left their mark
- Présentations spéciales, an eclectic section presenting unusual works
- FNC Explore, immersive, interactive and virtual reality programmes that are free and open for all
- FNC Forum, an industry network incubator
- P'tits loups, new cinema for children young and old
- Les Rencontres pancanadiennes du cinéma étudiant or RPCE, a national competition of short student films. This program traditionally also includes a selection of short films from a different international partner film school each year; these were formerly segregated into a separate non-competitive "RCPÉ Partner" stream, with the 2024 festival marking the first time that the official program dropped this distinction, and instead integrated films from a partner school in Vietnam into the same stream as the Canadian student films.
Notes
- The Compétition nationale section (meaning National competition) was previously known as Focus Québec/Canada and was created in 2006
- The Temps Ø section was created in 2004
- The FNC Lab section was divided into two sections in 2016: Les Nouveaux alchimistes and FNC Explore
- The FNC Forum section was previously known as FNC Pro and Open Source
- The RCPÉ (meaning Pan-Canadian Student Meetings) was created in 2015
- The P'tits loups section (meaning Little wolves) was created in 2008

== Prizes ==
- Louve d'or
- Daniel Langlois Innovation Award
- Prix d'interprétation
- Fipresci Prize
- Focus Grand Prize
- Loup argenté - short film
- Grand Prix Focus Short Film
- Temps Ø People's Choice Award
- Nouveaux alchimistes Prize
- Experimentation Award
- Dada Award
- P'tits loups Award
- Queer Louve Award for best LGBTQ-themed film

== Important moments ==
The festival was founded in 1971 by Claude Chamberlan and Dimitri Eipidès. The festival went through several name changes.

- 1971: Festival international du cinéma en 16mm de Montréal (Montreal International 16mm Film Festival).
- 1980: Renamed Festival international du nouveau cinéma de Montréal (Montreal International Festival of New Cinema)
- 1984: Renamed Festival international du nouveau cinéma et de la vidéo de Montréal (Montreal International Festival of New Cinema and Video)
- 1995: Renamed Nouveau festival international, cinéma, vidéo et nouvelles technologies de Montréal (New Montreal International Festival of Cinema, Video and New Technologies);
- 1997: Renamed Festival international du nouveau cinéma et des nouveaux médias de Montréal or FCMM (Montreal International Festival of New Cinema and New Media) as a result of the merger with the Festival international du court métrage de Montréal (Montreal International Short Film Festival).
- 2001: The Festival celebrated its 30th anniversary by offering an extraordinary selection and a commemorative book summarizing the festival's 30-year history.
- 2004: Adopted the current name Festival du nouveau cinéma (Festival of New Cinema).

== FNC and FIFM ==
In 2004 Daniel Langlois, director of FNC since 1999, left the organization to begin the Festival International de Films de Montréal (known in English as New Montreal FilmFest), which was initiated and created with the support of SODEC (Société de développement des entreprises culturelles) and Telefilm Canada after a dispute between these Canadian government sponsors and the Montreal World Film Festival.

Langlois initially programmed the Festival International de Films de Montréal (FIFM; New Montreal FilmFest) to coincide with the Montreal Festival of New Cinema and New Media (FCMM). According to press reports pertaining to the controversy between the Montreal World Film Festival (WFF/FFM) and the New Montreal FilmFest, Langlois planned to merge the two festivals, but failed to do so when the FCMM refused any such merger. The dates for the inaugural New Montreal FilmFest were ultimately changed to avoid conflicting with the dates of the FCMM.

In 2005, both the FNC and the New Montreal FilmFest came under new management. In early 2006, the New Montreal FilmFest folded after the failure of its inaugural festival. Both the FNC and the Montreal World Film Festival would continue to exist after the demise of the New Montreal FilmFest.

== Events ==
- 2016 Festival du nouveau cinéma
- 2017 Festival du nouveau cinéma
- 2018 Festival du nouveau cinéma
- 2019 Festival du nouveau cinéma
- 2020 Festival du nouveau cinéma
- 2021 Festival du nouveau cinéma
- 2022 Festival du nouveau cinéma
- 2023 Festival du nouveau cinéma
- 2024 Festival du nouveau cinéma
- 2025 Festival du nouveau cinéma
- 2026 Festival du nouveau cinéma

== See also ==
- List of film festivals in Canada
- Vancouver International Film Festival
- Toronto International Film Festival
- Fantasia International Film Festival
