= List of Indigenous Canadian actors =

List of Canadian actors/actresses who are First Nations, Métis or Inuit

This is a list of Canadian actors/actresses who are First Nations, Métis or Inuit.

== A ==
- Evan Adams, Coast Salish
- Paulina Alexis (Alexis Nakota)
- Allakariallak, Inuit
- Nathaniel Arcand, Plains Cree
- Gerald Auger, Woodland Cree
- Lise-Yolande Awashish, Atikamekw

== B ==
- Adam Beach, Saulteaux
- Tara Beagan, Nlakaʼpamux
- Tanaya Beatty, Awaetlatla
- Rykko Bellemare, Atikamekw
- Kwena Bellemare-Boivin
- Morris Birdyellowhead, Paul First Nation
- Ryan Rajendra Black
- Julian Black Antelope, Cree/Métis/Blackfoot
- Ta'Kaiya Blaney, Tla'amin Nation
- Cherish Violet Blood, Kainai
- Columpa Bobb, Tsleil-Waututh
- Sonia Boileau, Mohawk
- Tina Louise Bomberry, Mohawk
- Eugene Brave Rock, Kainai
- Joe Buffalo, Cree

== C ==
- Ashley Callingbull, Cree
- Cliff Cardinal, Cree/Lakota
- Imajyn Cardinal, Cree
- Lorne Cardinal, Cree
- Tantoo Cardinal, Cree, Métis
- Shirley Cheechoo, Cree
- Byron Chief-Moon
- Braeden Clarke, Cree
- George Clutesi, Tseshaht

== D ==
- Dan George, Tsleil-Waututh
- Darrell Dennis, Shuswap
- Grace Dove, Shuswap

== F ==
- Meegwun Fairbrother, Ojibwe
- Gary Farmer (Grand River Cayuga)
- Waawaate Fobister, Ojibwe
- Sharon Fontaine-Ishpatao, Innu
- Cree Summer Francks, Plains Cree (adopted)
- Rainbow Sun Francks, Plains Cree (adopted)

== G ==
- Cara Gee, Ojibwe
- Chief Dan George, Salish – nominated for an Academy Award for Best Supporting Actor, Little Big Man
- Glen Gould, Mi'kmaq
- Danis Goulet (Cree/Métis)
- Graham Greene (Oneida) - nominated for an Academy Award for Best Supporting Actor, Dances with Wolves
- Douglas Grégoire, Innu
- Yamie Grégoire, Innu
- Michael Greyeyes, Plains Cree
- Max Gros-Louis, Huron-Wendat

== H ==
- Dakota Ray Hebert, Dene
- Jimmy Herman, Dene, Chipewyan
- René Highway, Cree
- Zoe Hopkins, Heiltsuk, Mohawk
- Kaniehtiio Horn (Kahnawà:ke Mohawk)
- Dakota House, Cree
- Duane Howard, Nuu-chah-nulth

== I ==
- Johnny Issaluk, Inuit
- Madeline Ivalu, Inuit
- Paul-Dylan Ivalu, Inuit

== J ==
- Tom Jackson, Cree, Métis - known for his role of Billy Twofeathers on Shining Time Station and Peter Kenidi on North of 60
- Kawennáhere Devery Jacobs (Kahnawà:ke Mohawk)
- Ellyn Jade, Ojibwe

== K ==
- Jean-Luc Kanapé, Innu
- Margo Kane, Cree, Saulteaux
- Vinnie Karetak, Inuk
- Tina Keeper, Cree
- Kiawentiio, Mohawk
- Asivak Koostachin, Cree/Inuk
- Jules Arita Koostachin, Cree
- Harlan Blayne Kytwayhat, Cree

== L ==
- Anna Lambe, Inuit
- Tina Lameman, Cree
- Craig Lauzon, Ojibwe
- Jani Lauzon, Ojibwe, Cree
- George Leach, Lillooet
- Phillip Lewitski, Mohawk
- Cody Lightning (Samson Cree Nation)
- Crystle Lightning, Cree
- Georgina Lightning, Cree
- Kevin Loring, Nlaka'pamux
- Wendy Lumby, Swan Lake Ojibway

== M ==
- Cheri Maracle, Mohawk
- Gail Maurice, Métis
- Sera-Lys McArthur, Nakota/Assiniboine Pheasant Rump Nakota First Nation
- Glen Meadmore
- Andrea Menard, Metis
- Billy Merasty, Cree
- Steven Cree Molison, Cree/Métis
- Carmen Moore

== N ==
- Violet Nelson, Kwakwakaʼwakw
- Jacques Newashish, Atikamekw
- Paul Nutarariaq, Inuit, Ojibwe, Cree

== O ==
- Brandon Oakes, Mohawk
- Joshua Odjick, Algonquin
- Oshim Ottawa, Atikamekw
- Joel Oulette, Cree/Métis

== P ==
- Bronson Pelletier, Cree
- Wilma Pelly, Saulteaux
- Tahmoh Penikett, White River First Nation
- Jennifer Podemski (Muscowpetung Saulteaux descent)
- Sarah Podemski (Muscowpetung Saulteaux descent)
- Tamara Podemski (Muscowpetung Saulteaux descent)
- Michael Podemski-Bedard (Muscowpetung Saulteaux descent)

== R ==
- Paul Rabliauskas, Anishinaabe
- Justin Rain, Cree
- Duke Redbird, Ojibwe
- Alex Rice, Mohawk

== S ==
- Samian, Abitibiwinni
- August Schellenberg, Mohawk, Métis
- Eric Schweig, Inuvialuit, Chippewa, Dene
- Marika Sila, Inuvialuit
- Jay Silverheels, Mohawk - known for his role of Tonto on The Lone Ranger
- Bernard Starlight, Tsuutʼina Nation
- Michelle St. John, Cree
- Roseanne Supernault, Cree/Métis

== T ==
- Elle-Máijá Tailfeathers, Blackfoot-Sami
- Michelle Thrush, Cree
- Gordon Tootoosis, Cree, Stoney - best known for his role of Albert Golo on North of 60
- Andrina Turenne, Métis
- Billy Two Rivers, Mohawk

== U ==
- Natar Ungalaaq, Inuit

== W ==
- Jacob Whiteduck-Lavoie, Algonquin
- D'Pharaoh Woon-A-Tai (Oji-Cree)

== Y ==
- Johnny Yesno, Ojibwe

== See also ==
- List of Native American actors (U.S. actors)
- Indian Actors Association
- Indian Actors Workshop
