= 2015 Vancouver International Film Festival =

Canadian film event

- Opening film: Brooklyn by John Crowley
- Closing film: I Saw the Light by Marc Abraham
- Location: Vancouver, British Columbia, Canada
- Festival date: September 24–October 9, 2015

The 2015 Vancouver International Film Festival, the 34th event in the history of the Vancouver International Film Festival, was held from September 24 to October 9, 2015.

The festival's opening gala film was John Crowley's Brooklyn, and its closing gala was Marc Abraham's I Saw the Light.

== Awards ==
Award winners were announced on October 9.

| Award | Film | Filmmaker |
|---|---|---|
| People's Choice | Brooklyn | John Crowley |
| Most Popular Canadian Feature | Room | Lenny Abrahamson |
| Most Popular Canadian Documentary | Haida Gwaii: On the Edge of the World | Charles Wilkinson |
| Most Popular International Documentary | Ingrid Bergman: In Her Own Words (Jag är Ingrid) | Stig Björkman |
| Best Canadian Film | Sleeping Giant | Andrew Cividino |
| Best Canadian Short Film | Blue-Eyed Blonde | Pascal Plante |
| Emerging Canadian Director | The Sound of Trees (Le Bruit des arbres) | François Péloquin |
| Best BC Film | Fractured Land | Damien Gillis, Fiona Rayher |
| BC Emerging Filmmaker | The Devout | Connor Gaston |
| Most Promising Director of a Canadian Short Film | Never Steady, Never Still | Kathleen Hepburn |
| VIFF Impact: Canadian Audience Award | Fractured Land | Damien Gillis, Fiona Rayher |
| VIFF Impact: International Audience Award | Landfill Harmonic | Brad Allgood, Graham Townsley |
| Women in Film and Television Artistic Merit Award | Ninth Floor | Mina Shum |

== Films ==
=== Special Presentations ===
- Arabian Nights — Miguel Gomes
- Beeba Boys — Deepa Mehta
- Dheepan — Jacques Audiard
- High-Rise — Ben Wheatley
- Ingrid Bergman: In Her Own Words (Jag är Ingrid) — Stig Björkman
- Louder Than Bombs — Joachim Trier
- Room — Lenny Abrahamson
- A Tale of Three Cities — Mabel Cheung
- This Changes Everything — Avi Lewis
- Youth — Paolo Sorrentino

=== Canadian Images ===
- The Amina Profile (Le profil Amina) — Sophie Deraspe
- Borealis — Sean Garrity
- Charlotte's Song — Nicholas Humphries
- Le Dep — Sonia Boileau
- The Devout — Connor Gaston
- A Dog's Life (Chienne de vie) — Hélène Choquette
- Eadweard — Kyle Rideout
- Fire Song — Adam Garnet Jones
- The Forbidden Room — Guy Maddin, Evan Johnson
- Fractured Land — Damien Gillis, Fiona Rayher
- Frank and the Wondercat — Tony Massil, Pablo Alvarez Mesa
- Hadwin's Judgement — Sasha Snow
- Haida Gwaii: On the Edge of the World — Charles Wilkinson
- The Heart of Madame Sabali (Le cœur de Madame Sabali) — Ryan McKenna
- Hurt — Alan Zweig
- Hyena Road — Paul Gross
- Into the Forest — Patricia Rozema
- Michael Shannon Michael Shannon John — Chelsea McMullan
- My Good Man's Gone — Nick Citton
- My Internship in Canada (Guibord s'en va-t-en guerre) — Philippe Falardeau
- Ninth Floor — Mina Shum
- No Men Beyond This Point — Mark Sawers
- O, Brazen Age — Alexander Carson
- Our Loved Ones (Les êtres chers) — Anne Émond
- Painted Land: In Search of the Group of Seven — Phyllis Ellis
- The Pass System — Alex Williams
- Remember — Atom Egoyan
- The Sandwich Nazi — Lewis Bennett
- Sleeping Giant — Andrew Cividino
- The Sound of Trees (Le Bruit des arbres) — François Péloquin
- Tricks on the Dead: The Story of the Chinese Labour Corps in WWI — Jordan Paterson
- Ville-Marie — Guy Édoin

=== Cinema of Our Time ===
- 31st October — Shivaji Lotan Patil
- 45 Years — Andrew Haigh
- 600 Miles (600 Millas) — Gabriel Ripstein
- Absence (Ausência) — Chico Teixeira
- Accused (Lucia de B.) — Paula van der Oest
- Adama — Simon Rouby
- Ayanda — Sara Blecher
- The Boda Boda Thieves (Abbabi ba boda boda) — Donald Mugisha, James Tayler
- Body (Ciało) — Małgorzata Szumowska
- Bravo! (Aferim!) — Radu Jude
- Breathe (Umphefumlo) — Mark Dornford-May
- Chevalier — Athina Rachel Tsangari
- Chronic — Michel Franco
- The Club (El Club) — Pablo Larraín
- The Daughter — Simon Stone
- Dead Slow Ahead — Mauro Herce
- Decor — Ahmad Abdalla
- The Dinner (I nostri ragazzi) — Ivano De Matteo
- Embrace of the Serpent (El abrazo de la serpiente) — Ciro Guerra
- Entertainment — Rick Alverson
- Experimenter — Michael Almereyda
- The Falling — Carol Morley
- Francofonia — Alexander Sokurov
- Golden Kingdom — Brian Perkins
- Greenery Will Bloom Again (Torneranno i prati) — Ermanno Olmi
- Hilda — Andrés Clariond Rangel
- Home Care (Domácí péče) — Slávek Horák
- I Am Nojoom, Age 10 and Divorced — Khadija al-Salami
- I Promise You Anarchy (Te Prometo Anarquía) — Julio Hernández Cordón
- In Your Arms (I dine hænder) — Samanou Acheche Sahlstrøm
- It's Already Tomorrow in Hong Kong — Emily Ting
- Ivy (Sarmaşık) — Tolga Karaçelik
- Ixcanul — Jayro Bustamante
- Jafar Panahi's Taxi — Jafar Panahi
- James White — Josh Mond
- The Lobster — Yorgos Lanthimos
- London Road — Rufus Norris
- Lost and Beautiful (Bella e perduta) — Pietro Marcello
- Love Among the Ruins (Amore tra le rovine) — Massimo Ali Mohammad
- Love, Theft and Other Entanglements (Al-Hob wa Al-Sariqa wa Mashakel Ukhra) — Muayad Alayan
- Magallanes — Salvador del Solar
- The Magic Mountain — Anca Damian
- Marshland (La isla mínima) — Alberto Rodríguez Librero
- The Mask from San (Le Masque de San) — Jacques Sarasin
- Men Go to Battle — Zachary Treitz
- The Movement (El Movimiento) — Benjamín Naishtat
- Mustang — Deniz Gamze Ergüven
- My Skinny Sister (Min lilla syster) — Sanna Lenken
- Nahid — Ida Panahandeh
- Nasty Baby — Sebastián Silva
- One Floor Below (Un etaj mai jos) — Radu Muntean
- Paradise (Ma dar Behesht) — Sina Ataeian Dena
- Paulina (La Patota) — Santiago Mitre
- A Perfect Day — Fernando León de Aranoa
- Pioneer Heroes — Natalia Kudryashova
- The Project of the Century (La Obra del siglo) — Carlos Quintela
- Rainbow Island (Jazireh-ye Rangin) — Khosrow Sinai
- Rams (Hrútar) — Grímur Hákonarson
- Schneider vs. Bax — Alex van Warmerdam
- The Second Mother (Que Horas Ela Volta?) — Anna Muylaert
- Short Skin (I Dolori del giovane Edo) — Duccio Chiarini
- The Sky Trembles and the Earth Is Afraid and the Two Eyes Are Not Brothers — Ben Rivers
- Slackjaw — Zach Weintraub
- Son of Saul (Saul fia) — László Nemes
- Songs My Brothers Taught Me — Chloé Zhao
- Sparrows (Þrestir) — Rúnar Rúnarsson
- The Summer of Sangailė (Sangailės vasara) — Alantė Kavaitė
- Three Windows and a Hanging (Tri Dritare dhe një Varje) — Isa Qosja
- Tough Love (Härte) — Rosa von Praunheim
- The Treasure (Comoara) — Corneliu Porumboiu
- The Two of Us — Ernest Nkosi
- Umrika — Prashant Nair
- Victoria — Sebastian Schipper
- Wednesday, May 9 (Chaharshanbeh, 19 Ordibehesht) — Vahid Jalilvand
- Wondrous Boccaccio (Maraviglioso Boccaccio) — Paolo and Vittorio Taviani

=== Spotlight on France ===
- The Anarchists (Les Anarchistes) — Elie Wajeman
- Anton Tchékhov 1890 — René Féret
- Disorder (Maryland) — Alice Winocour
- In the Shadow of Women (L'Ombre des femmes) — Philippe Garrel
- The Last Hammer Blow (Le Dernier Coup de marteau) — Alix Delaporte
- The Measure of a Man (La Loi du marché) — Stéphane Brizé
- My Friend Victoria (Mon amie Victoria) — Jean-Paul Civeyrac
- My Golden Days (Trois souvenirs de ma jeunesse) — Arnaud Desplechin
- Portrait of the Artist (Le Dos rouge) — Antoine Barraud
- Standing Tall (La Tête haute) — Emmanuelle Bercot
- Vincent (Vincent n'a pas d'écailles) — Thomas Salvador
- We Did It on a Song (Chante ton bac d'abord) — David André

=== Documentaries ===
- 3 1/2 Minutes, 10 Bullets — Marc Silver
- Above and Below — Nicolas Steiner
- Alice Cares — Sander Burger
- All Eyes and Ears — Vanessa Hope
- Among the Believers — Hemal Trivedi, Mohammed Ali Naqvi
- Banking Nature — Denis Delestrac, Sandrine Feydel
- Brand: A Second Coming — Ondi Timoner
- City of Gold — Laura Gabbert
- Containment — Peter Galison, Robb Moss
- Dark Horse: The Incredible True Story of Dream Alliance — Louise Osmond
- Deep Time — Noah Hutton
- Drunk Stoned Brilliant Dead — Douglas Tirola
- Ever the Land — Sarah Grohnert
- Falciani's Tax Bomb: The Man Behind the Swiss Leaks — Ben Lewis
- A Flickering Truth — Pietra Brettkelly
- From Scotland with Love — Virginia Heath
- Hannah: Buddhism's Untold Journey — Adam Penny, Marta György-Kessler
- Homme Less — Thomas Wirthenson
- Hurricane — Andy Byatt
- Ice and the Sky (La Glace et le ciel) — Luc Jacquet
- In Transit — Albert Maysles, Lynn True, David Usui, Nelson Walker III, Benjamin Wu
- Jumbo Wild — Nick Waggoner
- Meru — Jimmy Chin, Elizabeth Chai Vasarhelyi
- The Messenger — Su Rynard
- Ming of Harlem: Twenty One Storeys in the Air — Phillip Warnell
- A Nazi Legacy: What Our Fathers Did — David Evans
- One Million Dubliners — Aoife Kelleher
- Palio — Cosima Spender
- The Pearl Button (El botón de nácar) — Patricio Guzmán
- Racing Extinction — Louie Psihoyos
- Requiem for the American Dream — Peter D. Hutchison, Kelly Nyks, Jared P. Scott
- The Royal Road — Jenni Olson
- Sam Klemke's Time Machine — Matthew Bate
- Steak (R)evolution — Franck Ribière
- A Syrian Love Story — Sean McAllister
- Topophilia — Peter Bo Rappmund
- Very Semi-Serious — Leah Wolchok
- The Visit (An Alien Encounter) — Michael Madsen

=== Dragons & Tigers ===
- 32 + 4 — Chan Hon Chun
- 100 Yen Love — Masaharu Take
- The Assassin — Hou Hsiao-hsien
- Alice in Earnestland — Ahn Gooc-jin
- Am I Dreaming of Others, or Are Others Dreaming of Me? — Shigeo Arikawa
- Big Father, Small Father and Other Stories — Phan Đăng Di
- Cemetery of Splendour — Apichatpong Weerasethakul
- The Chinese Mayor — Zhou Hao
- The Classified File — Kwak Kyung-taek
- The Console — Mitsuo Toyama
- Dark Mixer — Hirotoshi Iwasaki
- Gonin Saga — Takashi Ishii
- Goodbye Utopia — Ding Shiwei
- Greed: Ghost Light — Kim Nakyung
- I Can't Breathe — Sayaka Kihata
- Kaili Blues — Bi Gan
- Kim — Shumpei Shimizu
- Li Wen at East Lake — Luo Li
- Love And... — Zhang Lü
- Master Blaster — Sawako Kabuki
- A Matter of Interpretation — Lee Kwang-kuk
- A Midsummer's Fantasia — Jang Kun-jae
- Morning (Asa) + News — Takeshi Beat
- Mountains May Depart — Jia Zhangke
- Mr. Zhang Believes — Qiu Jiongjiong
- Murmur of the Hearts — Sylvia Chang
- My Life with a King — Carlo Encisco Catu
- Octopus — Isamu Hirabayashi
- Omura Plant Specimens — Natsumi Sudo
- Perfect Conjugal Bliss — Zhong Su
- A Place to Name — Ataru Sakagami
- Port of Call — Philip Yung
- Reflection — Yoju Matsubayashi
- Rolling — Masanori Tominaga
- Siti — Eddie Cahyono
- Tandem — King Palisoc
- Thanatos, Drunk — Chang Tso-chi
- Tharlo — Pema Tseden
- Three Stories of Love — Ryōsuke Hashiguchi
- Veil — Yoriko Mizushiri
- What Happened in Past Dragon Year — Sun Xun
- Yanji — Park Ki-yong
- Zinnia Flower — Tom Lin Shu-yu

=== Altered States ===
- Aaaaaaaah! — Steve Oram
- Cop Car — Jon Watts
- Crumbs — Miguel Llansó
- Deathgasm — Jason Lei Howden
- The Demolisher — Gabriel Carrer
- Green Room — Jeremy Saulnier
- The Nightmare (Der Nachtmahr) — Achim Bornhak
- Nina Forever — Ben Blaine, Chris Blaine
- Observance — Joseph Sims-Dennett
- The Similars (Los Parecidos) — Isaac Ezban

=== Arts & Letters ===
- 808 — Alexander Dunn
- Argentina (Zonda, folclore argentino) — Carlos Saura
- A Ballerina's Tale — Nelson George
- Circus Without Borders: The Story of Artcirq and Kalabante — Susan Gray
- The Competition — Angel Borrego Cubero
- The Dream of Shahrazad — François Verster
- Erbarme dich: Matthäus Passion Stories — Ramon Gieling
- Hockney — Randall Wright
- Imperfect Harmony — Carmen Cobos
- Innocence of Memories — Grant Gee
- Invention — Mark Lewis
- Landfill Harmonic — Brad Allgood, Graham Townsley
- Love Is All — Kim Longinotto
- Magicarena — Andrea Prandstaller, Niccolo Bruna
- Mavis! — Jessica Edwards
- Monty Python: The Meaning of Live — Roger Graef, James Rogan
- No Land's Song — Ayat Najafi
- Original Copy — Florian Heinzen-Ziob
- Paco de Lucía: A Journey (Paco de Lucía: La búsqueda) — Francisco Sánchez Varela
- Peggy Guggenheim: Art Addict — Lisa Immordino Vreeland
- Sound of Redemption: The Frank Morgan Story — N. C. Heikin
- Tana Bana — Pat Murphy
- The Thoughts That Once We Had — Thom Andersen

=== Canadian Short Films ===
- 4 Quarters — Ashley McKenzie
- At the Beach — Jeremy Peter Allen
- Balmoral Hotel — Wayne Wapeemukwa
- Big Brother — Lucas Hrubizna
- Big O — Jenna Hambrook
- Blood Manifesto — Theodore Ushev
- Blue-Eyed Blonde — Pascal Plante
- Blue Thunder (Bleu tonnerre) — Philippe David Gagné, Jean-Marc E. Roy
- Boxing — Grayson Moore, Aidan Shipley
- Calendar Girls — Lisa Birke
- The Canoe — Alex Balkam
- Clouds of Autumn — Trevor Mack, Matthew Taylor Blais
- Crazy House — Aaron Mirkin
- Debris — John Bolton
- The Dollhouse — Chad Galloway, Heather Benning
- Dysmorphia — Katherine Grubb
- Golden Teachers — Harry Cepka
- If I Was God — Cordell Barker
- Interview with a Free Man (Entrevue avec un homme libre) — Nicolas Lévesque
- Kokom — Kevin Papatie
- Lewis — Fantavious Fritz
- Lifeguard — Devan Scott, Will Ross
- Maurice — François Jaros
- May We Sleep Soundly — Denis Côté
- Mia — Amanda Strong, Bracken Hanuse Corlett
- The Muses of Salomé — Mirek Hamet
- My Enemy, My Brother — Ann Shin
- My Favourite Season — Liz Cairns
- Nephew — David Findlay
- Never Steady, Never Still — Kathleen Hepburn
- Ocean Falls — Ryan Ermacora, Jessica Johnson
- The Orchard — Darcy Van Poelgeest
- Penny's for Tea — Sophie Jarvis, Kane Stewart
- Rebel (Bihttoš) — Elle-Máijá Tailfeathers
- Rock the Box — Katherine Monk
- She Stoops to Conquer — Zack Russell
- The Sleepwalker (Sonámbulo) — Theodore Ushev
- Star — Émilie Mannering
- Wave — Jasmin Mozaffari
- Wind Through a Tree — Seth Smith
- Winter Hymns — Dusty Mancinelli
- World Famous Gopher Hole Museum — Chelsea McMullan

=== International Short Films ===
- Adolescence — Javier Blanco
- Almost Not Beautiful — Sarah Jean Kruchowski
- The Aquarium — Jacobie Gray
- Atlantis — Ben Russell
- Behold — Mark Sargent, Maya Tsambrou
- Birthday — Chris King
- Cheerful Blues for the Dead Man — J. M. Quevedo Gonzalez
- Cherry Cake — Jane Green
- Coffee to Go — Patricia Font
- Deformity Prays for Radiation — Nathan Hertz
- Drift — Felipe Prado
- The Error — Brando de Sica
- The Exquisite Corpus — Peter Tscherkassky
- The Formula — Kathrin Frey
- Gloria — Luis Hernandez de la Peña
- Harvey's Dream — Alexander von Hofmann
- In My Shoes — Mat Govoni, Monique Schafter
- In the Night — Joshua Erkman
- In the Still of the Night — Erich Steiner
- Injury Time — Jack Sheridan
- Interior. Family — Gerard Quinto, Esteve Soler, David Torras
- Last Base — Aslak Danbolt
- Little Bear — Daire Glynn, Ger Duffy
- Looking Out — Tristan Artin
- The Man from the Council — Barnaby Southcombe
- Mine — Trilby Glover
- The Moor — George Kyrtsis
- Mystic Jungfraujoch — Markus Eichenberger
- Night Without Distance — Lois Patiño
- Operator — Caroline Bartleet
- Red Nuts — Jackson Mullane
- A Riot — Nathan Silver
- Scrabble — Cristian Sulser
- Setting them Straight — Kaleb McKenna
- Soap — Christopher Brown
- Solo Finale — Ingo Putze
- Stutterer — Benjamin Cleary
- Through the Breaking Glass — Ivan Mena-Tinoco
- The Train — Asher Grodman
- Treading Water — Liz Cardenas Franke
- Trench — Nathan Hunt
