= List of Native American actors =

This is a list of Native American actors in the United States, including Alaskan Natives.

While Native American identity can be complex, it is rooted in political sovereignty that predates the creation of colonial nation states like the United States, Canada, and Mexico and persists into the 21st century recognized under international law by treaty. The Bureau of Indian Affairs defines Native American as having American Indian or Alaska Native ancestry. Legally, being Native American is defined as being enrolled in a federally recognized tribe, including Alaskan villages. Ethnologically, factors such as culture, history, language, religion, and familial kinships can influence Native American identity. All individuals on this list should have confirmed Native American ancestry. Historical figures might predate tribal enrollment practices and would be included based on ethnological tribal membership, while any contemporary individuals should either be enrolled members of federally recognized tribes or have cited Native American ancestry and be recognized as being Native American by their respective tribes(s). Contemporary unenrolled individuals should only be listed as being of descent from a tribe if they have confirmed heritage.

== A ==
- Victor Aaron (1956–1996), Yaqui descent
- Apesanahkwat, Menominee Nation
- Nathan Apodaca (Northern Arapaho/Mexican-American), actor, TikTok star

== B ==
- Bob Barker, Sicangu Lakota
- Dewey Beard a.k.a. Iron Hail, Lakota, Miniconjou
- Irene Bedard, Inupiaq
- Chief John Big Tree, Seneca
- Moses Brings Plenty, Oglala Lakota
- Cole Brings Plenty, nephew of Moses

== C ==
- Tonantzin Carmelo, Tongva/Kumeyaay descent
- Casey Camp-Horinek (Ponca Tribe of Indians of Oklahoma), activist, speaker, actor
- Alaqua Cox, Menominee/Mohican

== D ==
- Cody Deal (born 1986), Osage Nation

== E ==
- Chris Eyre, Southern Cheyenne director and producer

== F ==
- Lane Factor (Caddo/Seminole/Muscogee), television actor
- Sydney Freeland (Diné), director, filmmaker, producer, writer

== G ==
- Lily Gladstone, Blackfeet/Nez Perce descent actress
- Dallas Goldtooth (Mdewakanton Dakota/Diné))
- Forrest Goodluck, Navajo
- Kiowa Gordon (Hualapai)
- Rodney A. Grant, Omaha
- Saginaw Grant, Sac and Fox Nation
- Elva Guerra (Ponca/Mexican-American), actor
- Kimberly Norris Guerrero, Colville (enrolled), Salish-Kootenai descent

== H ==
- Sterlin Harjo (Seminole/Muscogee) actor, comedian, director, writer
- Charlie Hill, Oneida Nation, Mohawk, Cree
- Nathan Lee Chasing His Horse, Rosebud Lakota
- Jack Hoxie, Nez Perce
- Miko Hughes, Chickasaw
- Blu Hunt - American actress, Oglala Lakota
- Derek Hinkey, Paiute-Shoshone

== I ==
- Iron Hail, a.k.a. Dewey Beard, Lakota, Miniconjou

== J ==
- Devery Jacobs (Kahnawà:ke Mohawk)
- Ben Johnson, Cherokee, grew up on an Osage reservation

== K ==
- Oscar Kawagley, Yup'ik
- Geraldine Keams (Diné), actor
- Stepfanie Kramer, Eastern Band Cherokee

== L ==
- Eddie Little Sky, Oglala Lakota
- Phil Lucas, Choctaw Nation of Oklahoma filmmaker, actor, writer, producer, director, and editor

== M ==
- Gavin MacLeod, Ojibwe descent through his father
- Randolph Mantooth, Seminole
- Trixie Mattel, Ojibwe descent
- Robin Maxkii, Stockbridge-Munsee, actress
- Zahn McClarnon, Hunkpapa Lakota, actor
- Russell Means, Oglala Lakota, activist, actor
- Tatanka Means, Navajo, Lakota
- Amber Midthunder (Fort Peck Sioux)
- Cara Jade Myers (Wichita/Kiowa), actor

== O ==
- Sierra Teller Ornelas (Diné), writer

== P ==
- Migizi Pensoneau (Ponca/Ojibwe)), actor, comedian, writer
- Jon Proudstar (Pascua Yaqui)

== R ==
- Arthur Redcloud, Navajo
- Ryan RedCorn (Osage Nation)
- Red Shirt (Oglala), Lakota
- Red Wing, (Lillian St. Cyr), Winnebago Tribe of Nebraska
- Steve Reevis, Blackfeet
- Branscombe Richmond, Aleut
- Will Rogers (1879–1935), Cherokee, film and vaudeville actor, movie producer
- Ned Romero, film and television actor, Chitimacha
- Lois Red Elk, enrolled member of the Ft. Peck Sioux in Montana.

== S ==
- Frank Salsedo, Wappo
- Jana Schmieding (Cheyenne River Lakota), actor
- Will Sampson, Muscogee (Creek) Nation
- Larry Sellers, Osage, Cherokee, Lakota
- Martin Sensmeier (Tlingit/Koyukon Athabascan),
- Jay Silverheels, Mohawk people
- Sitting Bull, Lakota, Hunkpapa
- John Sitting Bull, Lakota, Hunkpapa
- William Sitting Bull, Lakota, Hunkpapa
- Charles Soldani, Osage and Kaw actor
- Eddie Spears, Brulé
- Michael Spears, Brulé
- Abigail Spencer, Cherokee
- Chaske Spencer, Sioux/Nez Perce/Cherokee/Muscogee descent
- Luther Standing Bear, Oglala Lakota author and actor
- Wes Studi, Cherokee Nation

== T ==
- Jim Thorpe, Sac and Fox
- Chief Thunderbird, Cheyenne
- John Trudell, Santee Dakota, activist, actor
- Sheila Tousey, Menominee, Stockbridge-Munsee
- Erica Tremblay (Seneca-Cayuga), director, filmmaker
- Ernest David Tsosie III (Diné), actor)

== U ==
- Misty Upham, Blackfeet Tribe

== W ==
- Noah Watts, Crow/Blackfeet
- Floyd Red Crow Westerman, Sisseton Wahpeton Oyate
- Richard Ray Whitman (Muscogee/Yuchi), actor, activist, artist
- Bobby Wilson (aka Bobby Dues) (Sisseton Wahpeton Dakota), actor, comedian, writer
- Mato Wayuhi, musician, actor

== Y ==
- James Young Deer, Nanticoke, 1876–1946
- Chief Yowlachie, Yakama

== See also ==
- List of Native Americans of the United States
- List of Indigenous Canadian actors
- Indian Actors Association
