= A Skin So Soft =

- Film poster
- French: Ta peau si lisse
- Directed by: Denis Côté
- Written by: Denis Côté
- Produced by: Denis Côté; Joëlle Bertossa; Jeanne-Marie Poulain; Dounia Sichov
- Cinematography: François Messier-Rheault
- Edited by: Nicolas Roy
- Production companies: Art et essai Close Up Films
- Distributed by: Breaking Glass Pictures
- Release date: 4 August 2017 (Locarno)
- Running time: 93 minutes
- Countries: Canada; France; Switzerland
- Language: French
- Budget: $75,000

A Skin So Soft (French: Ta peau si lisse) is a 2017 documentary film, directed by Canadian director Denis Côté. A Canadian, French and Swiss coproduction, the film chronicles the daily monotonous routines of a select few men whose lives revolve around extreme bodybuilding.

The film premiered at the Locarno International Film Festival in August 2017, and is slated to have its Canadian premiere at the 2017 Toronto International Film Festival.

The movie was originally produced in French and some have noted that the title's translation to English has produced a linguistic chasm. The direct translation of the French title, Ta peau si lisse being "a skin so smooth", which upon initial examination flows more easily with the images that come to mind when one thinks of the over pumped and well-maintained muscles of the Canadian bodybuilders featured, than the delicate title A Skin So Soft.

== Summary ==
Jean-François, Ronald, Alexis, Cédric, Benoit and Maxim are strongmen of modern times. They all share one common and ultimate desire: to overcome the limitations of man. The movie captures the discipline required of these strongmen in their daily lives.

== Cast ==
- Jean-François Bouchard
- Cédric Doyon
- Benoit Lapierre
- Maxim Lemire
- Alexis Légaré
- Ronald Yang
- Alexandre Auger (uncredited)
- Robin Strand (uncredited)

== Production ==
Filming was done in August 2016 at Eastern Townships.

== Critical reception ==
Many critics praised director Côté's focus on portraying the humane and sensitive sentiments of the bodybuilders. While the movie does highlight the tenacity and grit required to maintain this lifestyle, the focus on the alternative beauty available in this lifestyle was well received. However, there was a general sentiment that the film lost itself with poorly guided humor.

Amongst the unique focus of the film, the Montreal Gazette applauded the breakaway from a traditional narrative. In their review they admitted that while this was labelled a documentary, Côté was able to unsurprisingly captivate his audience by scraping a crafted tumultuous script and focus on the mundanity of their lives. A focus that they regarded as successful due to Côté's uncanny ability to make watching paint dry exciting.

In the official write-up for the film on the New Horizons Film Festival's website, Piotr Mirski states that the director is "fascinated with the bodybuilders" and furtherly notices: "The protagonists lift incredibly heavy weights so they can proudly flex their muscles in front of a mirror, a camera or a crowd of people. These are rough, strong men who simply want to feel beautiful." A reviewer from the LGBT-focused website We'll Always Have the Movies believed that the movie lacked depth and Côté's minimalist approach was one of its weak points. He noted: "It could have been a fine documentary about male rivalry and physical strength-obsessed individuals but Côté never went that way—despite the fact that they had all the tools needed." Slant Magazine's Clayton Dillard opined that Côté "consistently seeks to challenge the stereotypical displays of masculinity and meat-headed belligerence that weightlifters are prone to".

François Messier-Rheault won the Prix Iris for Best Cinematography in a Documentary at the 20th Quebec Cinema Awards in 2018.

== Release ==
A Skin So Soft was released on video-on-demand on March 7, 2018. The DVD rights for the United States release were acquired by Breaking Glass Pictures who released it on June 19, 2018.
