= 22nd Quebec Cinema Awards =

2020 Canadian film awards ceremony

The 22nd Quebec Cinema Awards were presented on 10 June 2020, to recognize talent and achievement in the cinema of Quebec. The planned 7 June ceremony was cancelled due to the COVID-19 pandemic, but nominees were announced 23 April. Abenaki documentary filmmaker Alanis Obomsawin was also selected as the recipient of the Iris Tribute at the unanimous recommendation of Québec Cinéma's Comité de représentation professionnelle.

Following the ceremony's cancellation, Québec Cinéma announced that on 10 June, most winners would be announced by webcast by Radio-Canada and ARTV, with the webcast hosted by Élise Guilbault, Guillaume Lambert and Mani Soleymanlou; following this, Jean-Philippe Wauthier hosted his show Bonsoir Bonsoir! where the winners for Best Film, Best Actor, Best Actress and the Public Prize were announced.

And the Birds Rained Down (Il pleuvait des oiseaux) received thirteen nominations, the most of the ceremony, and became the fifth film to receive a nomination in all four acting categories (not including Revelation of the Year). It won three awards, including two acting awards: Andrée Lachapelle posthumously won Best Actress while Gilbert Sicotte became the fourth person to receive three acting award and the first actor to win Best Actor three times.

Antigone was the night's big winner, winning six awards from eight nominations, including Best Film, Best Director, Best Screenplay and Revelation of the Year for Nahéma Ricci.

Mafia Inc. received ten nominations and won Best Supporting Actor for Sergio Castellitto, while The Twentieth Century received nine nominations and won four awards. Other winners include Matthias & Maxime who took home three awards from seven nominations, including Best Supporting Actress for Micheline Bernard, and Sympathy for the Devil who won three awards from six nominations.

Robin Aubert became the sixth performer to receive two acting nominations during the same ceremony, for Best Actor and Best Supporting Actor, but he didn't win either award.

Although the awards were ordinated as the 22nd Quebec Cinema Awards at the time of presentation, due to their presentation as a livestream rather than a traditional award ceremony Québec Cinéma opted to also enumerate its 2021 ceremony as the 22nd Quebec Cinema Awards instead of the 23rd; however, the awards in 2022 were numbered as the 24th Quebec Cinema Awards instead of the 23rd, indicating that the 2021 awards are now considered the 23rd Quebec Cinema Awards.

== Nominees and winners ==
Nominees and winners are:

Best Film	Best Director
Antigone – Marc Daigle; And the Birds Rained Down (Il pleuvait des oiseaux) – Ginette Petit; A Brother's Love (La femme de mon frère) – Sylvain Corbeil, Nancy Grant; Fabulous (Fabuleuses) – Nicole Robert; Kuessipan – Félize Frappier; Mafia Inc. – Antonello Cozzolino, Valérie D’Auteuil, André Rouleau; Young Juliette (Jeune Juliette) – Sylvain Corbeil	Sophie Deraspe, Antigone; Monia Chokri, A Brother's Love (La femme de mon frère); Guillaume de Fontenay, Sympathy for the Devil (Sympathie pour le diable); Matthew Rankin, The Twentieth Century; Myriam Verreault, Kuessipan
Best Actor	Best Actress
Gilbert Sicotte, And the Birds Rained Down (Il pleuvait des oiseaux); Robin Aubert, Young Juliette (Jeune Juliette); Marc-André Grondin, Mafia Inc.; Patrick Hivon, A Brother's Love (La femme de mon frère); Niels Schneider, Sympathy for the Devil (Sympathie pour le diable)	Andrée Lachapelle, And the Birds Rained Down (Il pleuvait des oiseaux); Anne-Élisabeth Bossé, A Brother's Love (La femme de mon frère); Anne Dorval, 14 Days, 12 Nights (14 jours 12 nuits); Léane Labrèche-Dor, Laughter (Le rire); Noémie O'Farrell, Fabulous (Fabuleuses)
Best Supporting Actor	Best Supporting Actress
Sergio Castellitto, Mafia Inc.; Robin Aubert, Thanks for Everything (Merci pour tout); Pier-Luc Funk, Matthias & Maxime; Sasson Gabai, A Brother's Love (La femme de mon frère); Rémy Girard, And the Birds Rained Down (Il pleuvait des oiseaux)	Micheline Bernard, Matthias & Maxime; Juliette Gosselin, Fabulous (Fabuleuses); Micheline Lanctôt, Laughter (Le rire); Ève Landry, And the Birds Rained Down (Il pleuvait des oiseaux); Geneviève Schmidt, Compulsive Liar (Menteur)
Best Screenplay	Best Cinematography
Sophie Deraspe, Antigone; Louise Archambault, And the Birds Rained Down (Il pleuvait des oiseaux); Jean Barbe, Guillaume de Fontenay and Guillaume Vigneault, Sympathy for the Devil (Sympathie pour le diable); Anne Émond, Young Juliette (Jeune Juliette); Naomi Fontaine and Myriam Verreault, Kuessipan	Yves Bélanger, 14 Days, 12 Nights (14 jours 12 nuits); Nicolas Canniccioni, Kuessipan; Josée Deshaies, A Brother's Love (La femme de mon frère); Mathieu Laverdière, And the Birds Rained Down (Il pleuvait des oiseaux); André Turpin, Matthias & Maxime
Best Art Direction	Best Sound
Dany Boivin, The Twentieth Century; Éric Barbeau, A Brother's Love (La femme de mon frère); Marie-Claude Gosselin and Jean Lebourdais, And the Birds Rained Down (Il pleuvait des oiseaux); Sylvain Lemaitre, Young Juliette (Jeune Juliette); David Pelletier, Mafia Inc.	Sylvain Bellemare, Jo Caron, Dominique Lacour and Bernard Gariépy Strobl, Sympathy for the Devil (Sympathie pour le diable); Claude Beaugrand, Michel B. Bordeleau and Bernard Gariépy Strobl, Claude La Haye and Raymond Legault, The Song of Names; Serge Boivin, Olivier Calvert, Samuel Gagnon-Thibodeau and Roger Guérin, Ville Neuve; Luc Boudrias, Sylvain Brassard and Jean Camden, Mafia Inc.; Bernard Gariépy Strobl, Sacha Ratcliffe and Lynne Trépanier, The Twentieth Century
Best Editing	Best Original Music
Geoffrey Boulangé and Sophie Deraspe, Antigone; Monia Chokri and Justine Gauthier, A Brother's Love (La femme de mon frère); Xavier Dolan, Matthias & Maxime; Myriam Poirier, 14 Days, 12 Nights (14 jours 12 nuits); Matthew Rankin, The Twentieth Century	Jean-Michel Blais, Matthias & Maxime; Andréa Bélanger and David Ratté, And the Birds Rained Down (Il pleuvait des oiseaux); Jean Massicotte and Jad Orphée Chami, Antigone; Howard Shore, The Song of Names; Peter Venne, The Twentieth Century
Best Costume Design	Best Makeup
Patricia McNeil, The Twentieth Century; Valérie Lévesque, Mafia Inc.; Ginette Magny, Jouliks; Patricia McNeil, A Brother's Love (La femme de mon frère); Caroline Poirier, And the Birds Rained Down (Il pleuvait des oiseaux)	Adriana Verbert, The Twentieth Century; Erik Gosselin and Edwina Voda, Matthias & Maxime; Jeanne Lafond, Jouliks; Léonie Lévesque-Robert, Fabulous (Fabuleuses); Marlène Rouleau and Bruno Gatien, Mafia Inc.
Best Hairstyling	Best Visual Effects
Nermin Grbic, The Twentieth Century; Michelle Coté, The Song of Names; Stéphanie Deflandre, Mafia Inc.; Daniel Jacob, Fabulous (Fabuleuses); Martin Lapointe, And the Birds Rained Down (Il pleuvait des oiseaux)	Benoît Brière, Louis-Philippe Clavet, and Kinga Sabela, Sympathy for the Devil (Sympathie pour le diable); Véronique Dessard and Philippe Frère, The Hummingbird Project; Alain Lachance and Jean-Pierre Riverin, The Song of Names
Best Documentary	Best Cinematography in a Documentary
Xalko — Hind Benchekroun, Sami Mermer; Alexander Odyssey (Alexandre le fou) — Pedro Pires; Dark Suns (Soleils noirs) — Julien Élie; Mad Dog and the Butcher (Les derniers vilains) — Thomas Rinfret, Vito Balenzano, Valérie Bissonette, Bruno Rosato; Ziva Postec: The Editor Behind the Film Shoah (Ziva Postec: La monteuse derrière le film Shoah) — Catherine Hébert, Christine Falco	Pedro Pires, Alexander Odyssey (Alexandre le fou); Dominic Dorval, Vincent Masse, Thomas Rinfret and Richard Tremblay, Mad Dog and the Butcher (Les derniers vilains); Sami Mermer, Xalko; François Messier-Rheault and Ernesto Pardo, Dark Suns (Soleils noirs); Pedro Ruiz, Havana, from on High (Sur les toits Havane)
Best Editing in a Documentary	Best Sound in a Documentary
Annie Jean, Ziva Postec: The Editor Behind the Film Shoah (Ziva Postec: La monteuse derrière le film Shoah); Benoît Côté and Thomas Rinfret, Mad Dog and the Butcher (Les derniers vilains); Sylvia De Angelis, Sophie Leblond and Pedro Pires, Alexander Odyssey (Alexandre le fou); Aube Foglia, Dark Suns (Soleils noirs); Natalie Lamoureux, A Woman, My Mother (Une femme, ma mère)	Wolfgang Beck, Mustafa Bölükbasi, Kerem Çakir, Huseyin Can Erol, Sonat Hançer, Eric Lebœuf, Bruno Pucella, Ibrahim Tarhan, Yener Yalçin and Tolga Yelekçi, Istanbul Echoes (Échos d'Istanbul); Luc Boudrias and Patrice LeBlanc, A Woman, My Mother (Une femme, ma mère); Sylvain Brassard, Benoit Leduc and Gaël Poisson Lemay, Alexander Odyssey (Alexandre le fou); Shelley Craig, Marie-Pierre Grenier, Luc Léger and Geoffrey Mitchell, Where the Land Ends (La fin des terres); René Portillo, Havana, from on High (Sur les toits Havane)
Best Live Action Short Film	Best Animated Short Film
Just Me and You (Juste moi et toi) — Sandrine Brodeur-Desrosiers, Johannie Deschambault; BKS (SDR) — Alexa-Jeanne Dubé, Émilie Mercier; Heart Bomb (Une bombe au cœur) — Rémi St-Michel, Christian Larouche, Sébastien Létourneau; I'll End Up in Jail (Je finirai en prison) — Alexandre Dostie, Hany Ouichou; Jojo — Guillaume Laurin, Fanny Forest, Julie Groleau	The Physics of Sorrow (Physique de la tristesse) — Theodore Ushev; Clothing (Les vêtements) — Caroline Blais; The Great Malaise (Le mal du siècle) — Catherine Lepage; Organic — Steven Woloshen; The Procession (Le cortège) — Pascal Blanchet and Rodolphe Saint-Gelais
Revelation of the Year	Best Casting
Nahéma Ricci, Antigone; Catherine Chabot, Compulsive Liar (Menteur); Sharon Fontaine-Ishpatao, Kuessipan; Alexane Jamieson, Young Juliette (Jeune Juliette); Lilou Roy-Lanouette, Jouliks	Sophie Deraspe, Isabelle Couture, Pierre Pageau and Daniel Poisson, Antigone; Jacinthe Beaudet, Tobie Fraser, Geneviève Hébert and Myriam Verreault, Kuessipan; Nathalie Boutrie, Young Juliette (Jeune Juliette); Nathalie Boutrie, Francis Cantin and Bruno Rosato, Mafia Inc.; Karel Quinn and Lucie Robitaille, And the Birds Rained Down (Il pleuvait des oiseaux)
Most Successful Film Outside Quebec	Public Prize
Matthias & Maxime — Xavier Dolan; Antigone — Sophie Deraspe; A Brother's Love (La femme de mon frère) — Monia Chokri; Genesis (Genèse) — Philippe Lesage; Ghost Town Anthology (Répertoire des villes disparues) — Denis Côté; Kuessipan — Myriam Verreault	And the Birds Rained Down (Il pleuvait des oiseaux); A Brother's Love (La femme de mon frère); Compulsive Liar (Menteur); Mafia Inc.; Thanks for Everything (Merci pour tout)
Best First Film	Iris Tribute
Sympathy for the Devil (Sympathie pour le diable) — Guillaume de Fontenay; Mad Dog Labine — Jonathan Beaulieu-Cyr, Renaud Lessard; The Twentieth Century — Matthew Rankin	Alanis Obomsawin

== Multiple wins and nominations ==
=== Films with multiple nominations ===
Nominations	Film
13	And the Birds Rained Down (Il pleuvait des oiseaux)
11	A Brother's Love (La femme de mon frère)
10	Mafia Inc.
9	The Twentieth Century
8	Antigone
7	Kuessipan
7	Matthias & Maxime
6	Sympathy for the Devil (Sympathie pour le diable)
6	Young Juliette (Jeune Juliette)
5	Fabulous (Fabuleuses)
4	Alexander Odyssey (Alexandre le fou)
4	The Song of Names
3	14 Days, 12 Nights (14 jours 12 nuits)
3	Compulsive Liar (Menteur)
3	Dark Suns (Soleils noirs)
3	Jouliks
3	Mad Dog and the Butcher (Les derniers vilains)
2	Havana, from on High (Sur les toits Havane)
2	Laughter (Le rire)
2	Thanks for Everything (Merci pour tout)
2	A Woman, My Mother (Une femme, ma mère)
2	Xalko
2	Ziva Postec: The Editor Behind the Film Shoah (Ziva Postec: La monteuse derrière le film Shoah)

=== Films with multiple wins ===
Wins	Film
6	Antigone
4	The Twentieth Century
3	And the Birds Rained Down (Il pleuvait des oiseaux)
3	Matthias & Maxime
3	Sympathy for the Devil (Sympathie pour le diable)
