= The White Guard (film) =

- French: La Garde blanche
- Spanish: La Guardia blanca
- Directed by: Julien Élie
- Written by: Julien Élie
- Produced by: Audrey-Anne Dupuis Pierre
- Cinematography: Ernesto Pardo; François Messier-Rheault
- Production company: Metafilms
- Release date: September 30, 2023 (Hamburg)
- Running time: 109 minutes
- Country: Canada
- Language: Spanish

The White Guard (French: La Garde blanche, Spanish: La Guardia blanca) is a Canadian documentary film, directed by Julien Élie and released in 2023. A followup to his 2018 film Dark Suns, the film delves further into the issue of violence in Mexico, profiling the collusion between multinational industry, organized crime and the government of Mexico to expropriate land and exploit people and natural resources.

The film premiered in September 2023 at Filmfest Hamburg, and had its Canadian premiere in November at the 2023 Montreal International Documentary Festival.

== Awards ==
Award	Date of ceremony	Category	Recipient(s)	Result	Ref.
Montreal International Documentary Festival	November 27, 2023	Magnus Isacsson Award	Julien Élie	Won	
Montreal International Documentary Festival	November 27, 2023	Student Jury Award	Julien Élie	Won	
Canadian Screen Awards	May 2024	Best Cinematography in a Documentary	Ernesto Pardo	Nominated	
Canadian Screen Awards	May 2024	Best Sound Design in a Documentary	Hans Laitres, Sylvain Bellemare, Daniel Capeille	Nominated	
Prix Iris	December 8, 2024	Best Cinematography in a Documentary	Ernesto Pardo, François Messier-Rheault	Nominated	
Prix Iris	December 8, 2024	Best Original Music in a Documentary	Mimi Allard	Won	
Prix Iris	December 8, 2024	Best Sound in a Documentary	Sylvain Bellemare, Hans Laitres, Daniel Capeille	Won	
