= Kuessipan =

2019 Canadian drama film

- Film poster
- Directed by: Myriam Verreault
- Written by: Myriam Verreault; Naomi Fontaine
- Based on: Kuessipan by Naomi Fontaine
- Produced by: Félize Frappier
- Starring: Sharon Fontaine-Ishpatao; Yamie Grégoire; Étienne Galloy
- Cinematography: Nicolas Canniccioni
- Edited by: Amélie Labrèche; Sophie Leblond; Myriam Verreault
- Music by: Louis-Jean Cormier
- Production company: Max Films Media
- Distributed by: Filmoption
- Release date: September 8, 2019 (TIFF)
- Running time: 117 minutes
- Country: Canada
- Languages: French; Innu-aimun

Kuessipan is a Canadian drama film, directed by Myriam Verreault and released in 2019. An adaptation of Naomi Fontaine's eponymous novel, the script was co-written by Fontaine and Verreault. Its plot centres on Mikuan (Sharon Fontaine-Ishpatao) and Shaniss (Yamie Grégoire), two young Innu women in Uashat-Maliotenam, whose friendship is strained when Mikuan falls in love with a white man (Étienne Galloy) and plans to move away.

The film premiered at the 2019 Toronto International Film Festival and was a critical success, garnering praise for its cast and portrayal of Indigenous lives. Its theatrical release on October 4, 2019.

== Plot ==
The film centers on Mikuan and Shaniss, two childhood friends who grow up together in Uashat. Their lives diverge during high school, when Shaniss drops out and has a baby with her abusive boyfriend Greg while Mikuan plans to move away from the reservation and attend university in Quebec City so that she can follow her dream of becoming a writer.

When Mikuan begins dating Francis, a white boy from her writing workshop, her friendship with Shaniss becomes strained. Mikuan helps Shaniss move out from Greg, but they argue after Shaniss accuses Mikuan of rejecting her culture by entering a relationship with Francis and planning to move away.

Mikuan's life is disrupted by the sudden death of her brother, a promising hockey player, and her break up with Francis. She and Shaniss eventually revive their friendship but their lives diverge, as Mikuan becomes a successful author and writes a book about Shaniss.

== Cast ==
- Sharon Fontaine-Ishpatao as Mikuan
- Yamie Grégoire as Shaniss
- Étienne Galloy as Francis
- Douglas Grégoire as Greg
- Brigitte Poupart as Enseignante

== Production ==
=== Development ===
The title of the film and eponymous novel is an Innu-aimun word meaning "it's your turn", which Fontaine meant to mean "it’s my turn to talk, my turn for my people and I to talk about our community." Verreault approached Fontaine after reading her novel Kuessipan in 2012 and being "deeply affected" by it. Verreault had previously lived and worked with the Innu community and produced short films about the Innu communities on the North Shore. The two agreed to make a film adaptation together, and co-wrote the film's script together.

The original novel is a collection of stories based on Fontaine's experiences growing up in Uashat. Verreault described the book as "not at all adaptable" to film, so she and Fontaine went through a process of creating a singular narrative that captured the themes of the book. Several changes were made from the original novel to adapt it for the screen, including the creation of Mikuan and Shaniss, who are not present in the novel. Production and development of the film took seven years.

=== Casting ===
The cast mostly included non-professional actors, from the Uashat community. Over 400 Innu actors took part in the casting process, with Verreault personally meeting with 200 of them. Twenty actors auditioned for the role of Mikuan, with fifteen actors auditioning for the role of Shaniss. Verreault invited three potential candidates for the role of Shaniss and two for the role of Mikuan to take part in a two-week workshop, after which Fontaine-Ishpatao and Grégoire were cast. The film was Fontaine-Ishpatao's debut role.

=== Filming ===
Cinematographer Nicolas Canniccioni and Verreault shot the film in Innu Takuaikan Uashat Mak Mani-Utenam and Sept-Îles, Quebec. It was shot in the French and Innu-aimun languages.

== Release ==
The film premiered at the 2019 Toronto International Film Festival. Its theatrical release in Quebec was held on October 4, 2019.

== Reception ==
The film has a 100% fresh rating on Rotten Tomatoes, indicating universal critical acclaim. Sara Clements of Exclaim! gave the film an 8 out of 10, writing that the film focused on an Indigenous perspective to portray the culture and experiences of the Innu people.

Anne T. Donahue of The Globe and Mail gave the film 4 out of 4 stars, describing the performances of Fontaine-Ishpatao and Grégoire as "raw and unflinching". Erica Commanda of Muskrat Magazine also praised their performances, which she wrote were "down-to-earth and realistic".

== Awards and nominations ==
Award	Date of ceremony	Category	Recipient(s) and nominee(s)	Result	Ref(s)
Canadian Cinema Editors	2 October 2020	Best Editing in a Feature Film	Amélie Labrèche, Myriam Verreault, Sophie Leblond	Won	
Canadian Screen Awards	28 May 2020	Best Supporting Actor	Douglas Grégoire	Nominated	
Canadian Screen Awards	28 May 2020	Best Supporting Actress	Yamie Grégoire	Nominated	
Canadian Screen Awards	28 May 2020	Best Adapted Screenplay	Myriam Verreault, Naomi Fontaine	Nominated	
Prix collégial du cinéma québécois	2020	Best Film	Kuessipan	Nominated	
Prix Iris	10 June 2020	Best Film	Félize Frappier	Nominated	
Prix Iris	10 June 2020	Best Director	Myriam Verreault	Nominated	
Prix Iris	10 June 2020	Best Screenplay	Myriam Verreault, Naomi Fontaine	Nominated	
Prix Iris	10 June 2020	Best Cinematography	Nicolas Canniccioni	Nominated	
Prix Iris	10 June 2020	Revelation of the Year	Sharon Fontaine-Ishpatao	Nominated	
Prix Iris	10 June 2020	Best Casting	Jacinthe Beaudet, Tobie Fraser, Geneviève Hébert, Myriam Verreault	Nominated	
Prix Iris	10 June 2020	Most Successful Film Outside Quebec		Nominated	
Québec City Film Festival	12–21 September 2019	Grand Prix de la Compétition – Long métrage		Won	
Windsor International Film Festival	1–10 November 2019	Prize in Canadian Film		Won	
Trophées francophone du cinéma	2021	Prix du meilleur second rôle féminin	Yamie Grégoire	Won	
San Francisco Bay Area Film Critics Circle	2021	Special Citation in Independent Cinema	Kuessipan	Won	
Festival de cinéma québécois de Biscarosse	2021	Prix du public	Kuessipan	Won	
Festival International du film de femmes de Salé	2021	Grand Prix	Kuessipan	Won	
Yarha Festival	2021	Prix du Meilleur scénario	Myriam Verreault, Naomi Fontaine	Won	
Common Good International Film Festival	2021	Prix du Meilleur film	Kuessipan	Won	
National Indigenous Screen Awards	2020	Prix Meilleure actrice	Sharon Fontaine-Ishpatao	Won	
National Indigenous Screen Awards	2020	Meilleure actrice	Yamie Grégoire	Nominated	
Festival international du film d'éducation	2020	Prix du Meilleur long métrage de fiction	Kuessipan	Won	
Festival International du Film d'Amiens	2020	Grand Prix	Kuessipan	Won	
Minsk International Film Festival	2020	Prix du Meilleur film	Kuessipan	Won	
Festival Effervescence, Mâcon	2020	Prix du public	Kuessipan	Won	
Ohlalà Festival de cinema francòfon de Barcelona	2020	Mention spéciale du Jury des jeunes	Kuessipan	Won	
Nashville Film Festival	2020	Grand prix - Best narrative Feature	Kuessipan	Won	
Film by the Sea, Vlissingen	2020	Prix TV5 Monde - Meilleur film francophone	Kuessipan	Won	
Cinemagic Belfast	2020	Meilleur film de fiction	Kuessipan	Won	
Molodist Kyiv Film Festival	2020	Scythian Deer - Grand Prix (ex aequo)	Kuessipan	Won	
Molodist Kyiv Film Festival	2020	Mention spéciale du Jury œcuménique	Kuessipan	Won	
Zlin International Film Festival	2020	Grand Prix	Kuessipan	Won	
Festival du film canadien de Dieppe	2020	Prix du Public - TV5 Monde	Kuessipan	Won	
Festival du film canadien de Dieppe	2020	Prix Jean Malaurie	Kuessipan	Won	
Festival du film canadien de Dieppe	2020	Prix Révélation : Sharon Fontaine-Ishpatao	Kuessipan	Won	
Festival du film canadien de Dieppe	2020	Prix de la Ville de Dieppe	Kuessipan	Won	
Festival du film canadien de Dieppe	2020	Prix du Zonta Club	Kuessipan	Won	
Festival International du Film d’Aubagne	2020	Prix du Meilleur Long métrage	Kuessipan	Won	
Festival International du Film d’Aubagne	2020	Mention spéciale à Sharon Fontaine-Ishpatao	Kuessipan	Won	
Festival international du film sur les droits humains, Genève	2020	Mention spéciale Jury Fiction	Kuessipan	Won	
Festival international du film sur les droits humains, Genève	2020	Mention spéciale Jury des Jeunes	Kuessipan	Won	
Rendez-vous Québec Cinéma	2020	Prix Gilles-Carle du meilleur 1er ou 2e long métrage de fiction	Kuessipan	Won	
Rendez-vous Québec Cinéma	2020	Prix Jacques-Marcotte Meilleur scénario de long métrage de fiction	Myriam Verreault, Naomi Fontaine	Won	
Rendez-vous Québec Cinéma	2020	Prix du jury en herbe Meilleur long métrage de fiction	Kuessipan	Won	
Festival International du Premier Film d'Annonay	2020	Prix spécial du jury	Kuessipan	Won	
Göteborg Film Festival	2020	Mention spéciale, Ingmar Bergman International Debut Award	Kuessipan	Won	
Cinoche - Festival de film international de Baie-Comeau	2020	Prix du Meilleur film canadien	Kuessipan	Won	
Festival international du cinéma francophone en Acadie	2019	Prix du Meilleur film canadien	Kuessipan	Won	
Vancouver International Film Festival	2019	Special Mention, Best Canadian Emerging Director	Myriam Verreault	Won	
Festival international du film francophone de Namur	2019	Mention spéciale du jury	Kuessipan	Won	
