= The Sound of Trees (film) =

2015 Canadian film

- Film poster
- French: Le Bruit des arbres
- Directed by: François Péloquin
- Written by: Sarah Lévesque; François Péloquin
- Produced by: Ziad Touma
- Starring: Antoine L'Écuyer; Roy Dupuis
- Cinematography: François Messier-Rheault
- Edited by: Martin Bourgault; Aube Foglia; Simon Sauvé
- Music by: Mimi Allard
- Production company: Couzin Films
- Distributed by: Les Films K Amérique
- Release date: July 3, 2015
- Running time: 78 minutes
- Country: Canada
- Language: French
- Budget: C$1.25 million

The Sound of Trees (French: Le Bruit des arbres) is a 2015 Canadian coming-of-age drama film directed by François Péloquin and co-written by Péloquin and Sarah Lévesque. Starring Antoine L’Écuyer and Roy Dupuis, the film centres on a teenage trainee lumberjack in Quebec’s Bas-Saint-Laurent region. It won Péloquin the Emerging Canadian Director award at the Vancouver International Film Festival and screened in competition at Karlovy Vary.

== Synopsis ==
Jérémie, a 17-year-old trainee lumberjack living in the Bas-Saint-Laurent region of Quebec, dreams of leaving the family sawmill run by his father Régis. As his older brother prepares to marry and leave home, and the future of the business becomes uncertain, tensions grow between Jérémie and his father.

== Cast ==
The cast includes:

- Antoine L’Écuyer as Jérémie
- Roy Dupuis as Régis
- Willia Ferland-Tanguay as Maya
- Rémi Goulet as Francis
- Charles-Émile Lafleur as P.O.

== Production ==
The film was produced by Couzin Films. It was directed by François Péloquin and written by Péloquin and Sarah Lévesque. Filming took place from August 18 to September 15, 2014, in Saint-Ulric, Saint-Léandre, Baie-des-Sables, Sainte-Anne-des-Monts, Saint-Noël and Matane. The film had an approximate budget of C$1.25 million.

== Release ==
The film was released in theatres on July 3, 2015. It was selected for the official competition at the 50th Karlovy Vary International Film Festival, and later released on DVD in Quebec by K-Films Amérique on October 20, 2015.

== Reception ==
=== Critical response ===
Writing for Variety, Guy Lodge described the film as a familiar coming-of-age summer story, but wrote that François Péloquin’s "touching, accomplished debut succeeds in the details". Lodge also noted its "close, compassionate view" of Jérémie’s rural community and praised Antoine L’Écuyer’s performance.

Boyd van Hoeij of The Hollywood Reporter described the film as an "affecting and beautifully shot coming-of-age film", noted its strong regional atmosphere, and praised Antoine L’Écuyer’s "towering, apparently effortless performance".

Writing for Eye for Film, Richard Mowe called the film an "absorbing drama" and wrote that Péloquin’s anthropology background was evident in his attention to ordinary behaviour.

=== Awards ===
At the 2015 Vancouver International Film Festival, Péloquin received the Emerging Canadian Director award for the film.
