= Sympathy for the Devil (2019 film) =

2019 Canadian drama film

- Film poster
- French: Sympathie pour le diable
- Directed by: Guillaume de Fontenay
- Written by: Guillaume de Fontenay; Guillaume Vigneault; Jean Barbe
- Based on: Sympathie pour le diable by Paul Marchand
- Produced by: Pascal Bascaron; Nicole Robert; Jean-Yves Robin; Marc Stanimirovic
- Starring: Niels Schneider; Vincent Rottiers; Ella Rumpf
- Cinematography: Pierre Aim
- Edited by: Mathilde Van de Moortel
- Production companies: Monkey Pack Films; Go Films; Logical Pictures
- Distributed by: Les Films Séville (Canada); Rezo Films (France); Distri7 (Belgium)
- Release date: November 11, 2019 (Cinemania)
- Running time: 100 minutes
- Countries: Canada; France; Belgium
- Language: French

Sympathy for the Devil (French: Sympathie pour le diable) is a 2019 war drama film directed by Guillaume de Fontenay and released in 2019. Based on the book of the same name by French war correspondent Paul Marchand, the film stars Niels Schneider as Marchand covering the Bosnian War in the 1990s.

The cast also includes Vincent Rottiers and Ella Rumpf.

The film, a coproduction of companies from Canada, France and Belgium, had its Canadian theatrical premiere at the Cinemania film festival on November 11, 2019, before premiering commercially on November 29.

== Cast ==
- Niels Schneider as Paul Marchand
- Ella Rumpf as Boba
- Vincent Rottiers as Vincent
- Clément Métayer as Philippe
- Arieh Worthalter as Ken Doyle
- Elisa Lasowski as Louise Baker
- Diego Martín as Luis

== Accolades ==
Award	Date of ceremony	Category	Recipient(s)	Result	Ref(s)
Canadian Screen Awards	28 May 2020	Best Adapted Screenplay	Guillaume de Fontenay, Guillaume Vigneault, Jean Barbe	Nominated	
Canadian Screen Awards	28 May 2020	Best Visual Effects	Benoît Brière, Kinga Sabela	Nominated	
Canadian Screen Awards	28 May 2020	John Dunning Best First Feature Award	Guillaume de Fontenay	Nominated	
Prix collégial du cinéma québécois	2020	Best Film	Sympathy for the Devil	Nominated	
Prix Iris	10 June 2020	Best Director	Guillaume de Fontenay	Nominated	
Prix Iris	10 June 2020	Best Actor	Niels Schneider	Nominated	
Prix Iris	10 June 2020	Best Screenplay	Guillaume de Fontenay, Guillaume Vigneault, Jean Barbe	Nominated	
Prix Iris	10 June 2020	Best Sound	Sylvain Bellemare, Jo Caron, Bernard Gariépy Strobl	Won	
Prix Iris	10 June 2020	Best Visual Effects	Benoît Brière, Kinga Sabela	Won	
Prix Iris	10 June 2020	Best First Film	Guillaume de Fontenay	Won	
