= Naomi Fontaine =

Canadian Innu writer (born 1987)

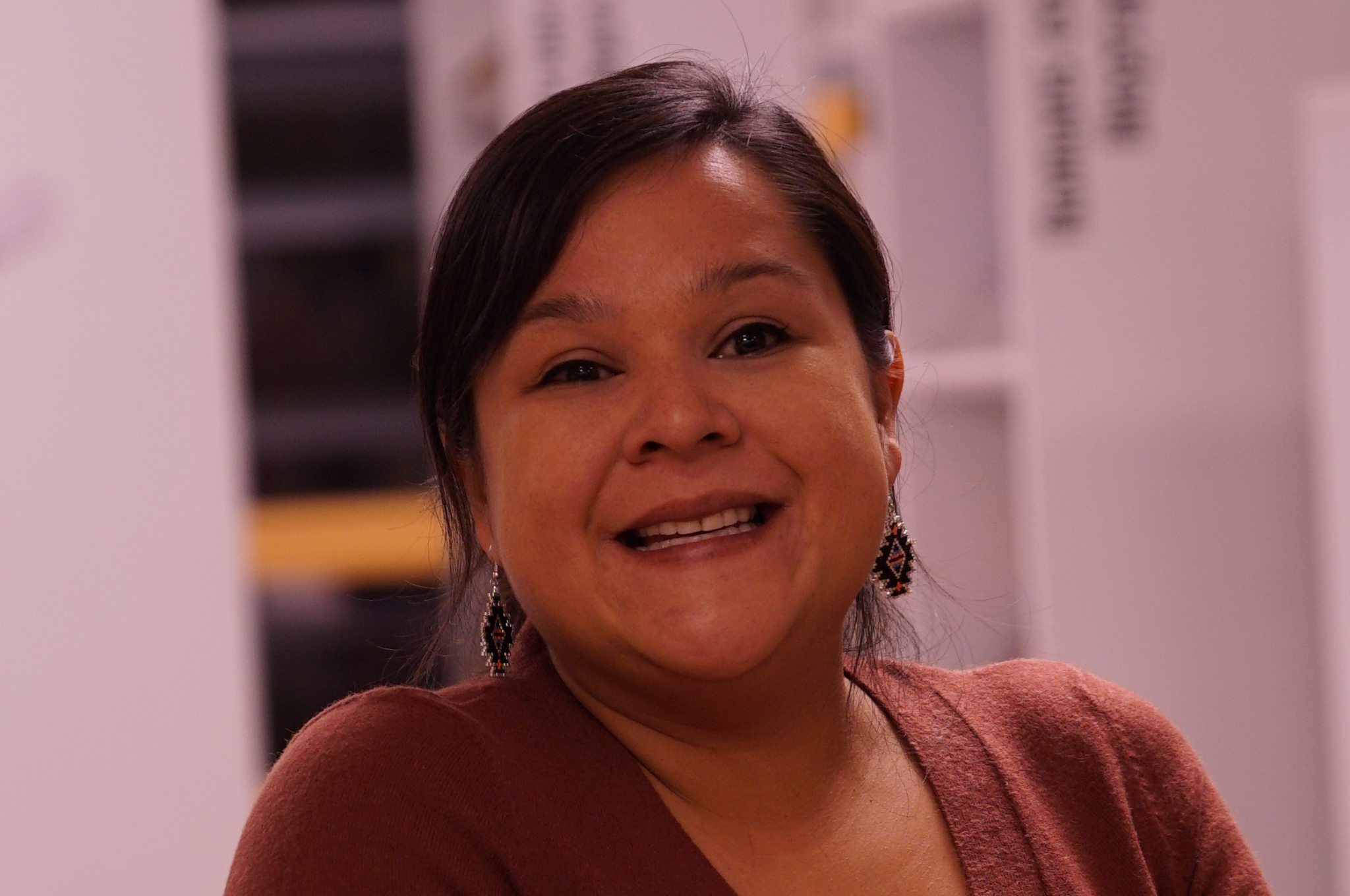
- Born: September 29, 1987 (age 39); Uashat, Canada
- Occupations: Novelist, Teacher
- Writing career
- Notable works: Kuessipan; Manikanetish
- Movement: CanLit

Naomi Fontaine is a Canadian writer from Quebec, noted as one of the most prominent First Nations writers in contemporary francophone Canadian literature. She is a member of the Innu nation.

== Biography ==
A member of the Innu nation from Uashat, Quebec, she moved to Quebec City at the age of 7. She studied education at the Université Laval.

Her 2011 debut novel Kuessipan received an honourable mention from the Prix des cinq continents de la francophonie in 2012. Kuessipan is an meditative novel about life in the wilds of northeastern Quebec. Fontaine wrote this novel in French at the age of twenty-three. She depicts a community of Innu, nomadic hunters and fishers, and of hard-working mothers and their children, enduring a harsh, sometimes cruel reality with quiet dignity. Pervading the book is a palpable sense of place and time played out as a series of moments. Elders who watch their kin grow up before their eyes; couples engaged in domestic crises, and young people undone by alcohol; caribou-skin drums that bring residents to their feet; and lives spent along a bay that reflects the beauty of the earth and the universal truth that life is a fleeting puzzle whose pieces must be put together before it can be fully lived.

Her second novel, Manikanetish, was published in 2017, and was a shortlisted finalist for the Governor General's Award for French-language fiction at the 2018 Governor General's Awards. Also in 2017, her short piece "Tshinanu" was selected for inclusion in Granta's Canadian issue.

Manikanetish was selected for the 2019 edition of Le Combat des livres, where it was defended by surgeon Stanley Vollant.

Her novel Kuessipan was adapted by Myriam Verreault into the 2019 theatrical feature film Kuessipan. Verreault and Fontaine received a Prix Iris nomination for Best Screenplay at the 22nd Quebec Cinema Awards for the film.

Fontaine has now settled back in Uashat and works at the Tshakapesh cultural institute. Her most recent novel, Eka ashate. Ne flanche pas (2025), is a series of portraits of Innu characters in Uashat and their life trajectories in a context of modern challenges.

== Works ==
- Kuessipan. Mémoire d'encrier, 2011
  - (in English) transl. David Homel: Kuessipan. Arsenal Pulp Press 2013
- Manikanetish. Mémoire d'encrier, 2013
- (in English) transl. David Homel: Tshinanu. Granta #141, special: Canada september 2017, pp. 279–285 (from the French)
  - (in German and French) transl. Sonja Finck: Tshinanu. In Jennifer Dummer ed.: Pareil, mais différent - Genauso, nur anders. Frankokanadische Erzählungen. Bilingue. dtv, Munich 2020, pp 92–109
- Avec Olivier Dezutter, Jean-François Létourneau éd.: Tracer un chemin: Meshkanatsheu. Hannenorak, 2017
- Shuni. Mémoire d'encrier, 2019 (winner of the "Prix littéraire des collégiens", 2020)
- Eka Ashate. Ne flanche pas, Memoire d'encrier, 2025 (ISBN 978-2-89872-036-9)
