= Shifting Baselines =

2025 Canadian documentary film

- Directed by: Julien Élie
- Written by: Julien Élie
- Produced by: Julien Élie; Andreas Mendritzki; Aonan Yang
- Cinematography: François Messier-Rheault; Glauco Bermudez
- Edited by: Xi Feng
- Production company: GreenGround Productions
- Distributed by: Les Films du 3 mars Filmotor
- Release date: April 5, 2025 (Visions du Réel)
- Running time: 100 minutes
- Country: Canada
- Languages: English; French; Spanish

Shifting Baselines is a Canadian documentary film, directed by Julien Élie and released in 2025. The film profiles the environmental and social impact of Elon Musk's SpaceX Starbase project on the region of Boca Chica, Texas.

The film premiered on April 5, 2025, at the Visions du Réel documentary film festival, and had its Canadian premiere at the 2025 Hot Docs Canadian International Documentary Festival.

== Critical response ==
Walter Neto of the International Cinephile Society wrote that the film "understands the power of the stories we tell ourselves, not just about the past, but about the future. And in doing so it never shies away from, for example, calling out Elon Musk’s Starlink project and its disastrous launches and its role in contributing to space pollution, a commendable quality of the film. In other words, Shifting Baselines suggests that the push to colonize Mars is, above all, a program to colonize our minds, to make it seem acceptable for governments to ignore the environmental catastrophes happening here and now. Because supposedly there’s a backup plan, a fresh start waiting elsewhere."

For Point of View, Pat Mullen wrote that the film "gives the endeavour credit as it illustrates how communities across the world benefit from SpaceX’s StarLink satellites and the internet they provide. The arresting cinematography by Glauco Bermudez and François Messier-Rheault builds a sense of unease as Elie takes audiences away from Boca Chica to observe different corners of the globe that thrive without really seeing the consequences with which SpaceX achieves progress."

Allan Hunter of Screen Daily wrote that "One of the most appealing aspects of the documentary is the striking black and white cinematography of Glauco Bermudez and Francois Messier-Rheault which captures ashen beaches, snowy landscapes and a feeling of Boca Chica as something otherworldly. Elie’s priority is always the human perspective on the sweeping changes around Boca Chica, where beaches are deserted and houses exist to service the needs of what has become a company village (with shades of Wes Anderson's Asteroid City). He gradually expands the focus to look at the space race through more critical, concerned eyes. Many of these interviewed are never identified, but one person remarks that few of the ordinary citizens of Boca Chica or nearby Mexico are ever likely to afford a ticket for space travel."

== Awards ==
The film won the Green Dox Award for best environmental documentary at the 2025 edition of Dokufest.

It was a shortlisted finalist for the 2026 Prix Luc-Perreault.
