= Dark Suns (film) =

2018 Canadian documentary film

- Film poster
- French: Soleils noirs
- Directed by: Julien Élie
- Written by: Julien Élie
- Produced by: Julien Élie
- Cinematography: François Messier-Rheault; Ernesto Pardo
- Edited by: Aube Foglia
- Music by: Mimi Allard
- Production company: Cineme Belmopan
- Distributed by: Funfilm Distribution
- Release date: November 8, 2018 (RIDM)
- Running time: 152 minutes
- Country: Canada
- Language: Spanish

Dark Suns (French: Soleils noirs) is a Canadian documentary film, directed by Julien Élie and released in 2018. The film examines the epidemic of murder as consequence of the illegal drug trade in Mexico. It centres on "the stories of disappeared women" and "the violence against journalists, union leaders, social rights activists, and priests", primarily through the personal testimonies of surviving friends, colleagues and family members of murder victims.

The film premiered at the Montreal International Documentary Festival in November 2018, and received a commercial run in 2019 alongside other film festival screenings.

In 2023 Élie followed up with The White Guard (La Garde blanche), which delved further into the issue of state-sponsored violence in Mexico.

== Critical response ==
In a review for Film Inquiry, the film was described as "remarkably constructed despite the non-linear storytelling." The reviewer added, "Dark Suns is utterly vital and haunting, chronicling a staggering history of crime and injustice that needs – and has long needed – urgent attention from any higher-up with a conscience. It's often difficult to stomach, but these stories need to be told."

For the Modern Times Review, "Julien Elie's Mexico is a nightmare where anyone can disappear, anybody can get killed, and everybody is in constant danger. Criminals produce mass graves while countless people look for the bones of loved ones."

== Awards ==
The film won the Sichtwechsel Film Award at Filmfest Hamburg in 2019. It received three Prix Iris nominations at the 22nd Quebec Cinema Awards in 2020, for Best Documentary Film, Best Cinematography in a Documentary (François Messier-Rheault and Ernesto Pardo) and Best Editing in a Documentary (Aube Foglia).
