= A Brother's Love =

2019 film by Monia Chokri

- Theatrical release poster
- French: La femme de mon frère
- Directed by: Monia Chokri
- Written by: Monia Chokri
- Produced by: Nancy Grant; Sylvain Corbeil
- Starring: Anne-Élisabeth Bossé; Patrick Hivon; Evelyne Brochu; Sasson Gabai; Micheline Bernard; Mani Soleymanlou; Magalie Lépine-Blondeau
- Cinematography: Josée Deshaies
- Edited by: Monia Chokri; Justine Gauthier
- Music by: Olivier Alary
- Production company: Metafilms
- Distributed by: Les Films Séville
- Release dates: 15 May 2019 (Cannes); 7 June 2019 (Canada)
- Running time: 117 minutes
- Country: Canada
- Language: French
- Box office: $1.7 million

A Brother's Love (French: La femme de mon frère, lit. 'My Brother's Wife') is a 2019 Canadian comedy-drama film written and directed by Monia Chokri. It had its world premiere in the Un Certain Regard section of the 2019 Cannes Film Festival. It was released theatrically in Canada on 7 June 2019 by Les Films Séville.

The film stars Anne-Élisabeth Bossé as Sophia, an immature university graduate student who is forced to reassess her life when her brother Karim (Patrick Hivon), with whom she has always had a very close and codependent relationship, falls in love with her gynecologist Éloise (Evelyne Brochu).

== Plot ==
Sophia earns her PhD for her thesis on Antonio Gramsci, but discovers a lack of teaching positions available in her field and is saddled with student debt. At age 35, she lives rent-free with her brother Karim and leads tours at a local art gallery. Pregnant, Sophia seeks an abortion and she and Karim meet Eloïse, a doctor. Eloïse recognizes Karim as a man she met and slept with when she first moved to Montreal several years ago. Although Karim does not remember Eloïse, they agree to see each other again. After the abortion, Sophia tells Karim he should date a woman like Eloïse, but is turned off when he replies he will see Eloïse herself. Sophia loses her job at the gallery and decides to write a novel. She returns to Karim's apartment and speaks loudly about how she imagined Karim's date with Eloïse went, speculating Eloïse is frigid and shallow. Sophia is embarrassed to see Eloïse is in the apartment. Envious and concerned about Karim entering into an increasingly serious relationship, Sophia watches Eloïse as she interacts with Karim.

Eloïse and Karim take Sophia to a dinner, and Eloïse also brings her best friend Jasmin, a male midwife. Concerned she has been lured into a double date, Sophia is offended when Jasmin says giving birth is the most important event of a woman's life; Sophia never wants to have children. Jasmin and Sophia share a taxi, and Jasmin asks to see her again, though Sophia is reluctant. Eloïse then joins Karim and Sophia in a dinner with their parents. There, Sophia engages in a heated argument over her family, saying the world is overpopulated (when Eloïse expresses a desire for children) and her eight years of education were for nothing. Sophia storms out and refuses to apologize. She leaves Karim's apartment for a room at Jasmin's apartment; she also accepts a job as a French-language tutor for immigrants in the suburbs. Jasmin and Sophia have sex; the next morning, Sophia rushes to her new job and struggles on where to begin.

Sophia visits Eloïse in her office and tearfully apologizes for her behaviour at their last dinner. She confesses she had never seen her brother so happy. Eloïse replies by comparing the sibling relationship to atomic theory; since people are made up of atoms, they inherit their atoms from their parents, and she understands Karim and Sophia share a connection.

== Cast ==
- Anne-Élisabeth Bossé as Sophia
- Patrick Hivon as Karim
- Evelyne Brochu as Eloïse
- Mani Soleymanlou as Jasmin
- Magalie Lépine-Blondeau as Anabelle Lajoie
- Sasson Gabai as Hichem
- Niels Schneider as Alex
- Mylène Mackay as Emilie
- Micheline Bernard as Lucie

== Accolades ==
Award	Date of ceremony	Category	Recipient(s)	Result	Ref(s)
Canadian Screen Awards	28 May 2020	Best Cinematography	Josée Deshaies	Nominated	
Canadian Screen Awards	28 May 2020	Best Costume Design	Patricia McNeil	Nominated	
Cannes Film Festival	14–25 May 2019	Jury Coup de Coeur	Monia Chokri	Won	
Prix collégial du cinéma québécois	2020	Best Film	A Brother's Love	Nominated	
Prix Iris	10 June 2020	Best Film	Sylvain Corbeil, Nancy Grant	Nominated	
Prix Iris	10 June 2020	Best Director	Monia Chokri	Nominated	
Prix Iris	10 June 2020	Best Actor	Patrick Hivon	Nominated	
Prix Iris	10 June 2020	Best Actress	Anne-Élisabeth Bossé	Nominated	
Prix Iris	10 June 2020	Best Supporting Actor	Sasson Gabai	Nominated	
Prix Iris	10 June 2020	Best Cinematography	Josée Deshaies	Nominated	
Prix Iris	10 June 2020	Best Art Direction	Éric Barbeau	Nominated	
Prix Iris	10 June 2020	Best Editing	Monia Chokri, Justine Gauthier	Nominated	
Prix Iris	10 June 2020	Best Costume Design	Patricia McNeil	Nominated	
Prix Iris	10 June 2020	Most Successful Film Outside Quebec		Nominated	
Prix Iris	10 June 2020	Public Prize		Nominated	
