= Micheline Bernard =

Canadian actress

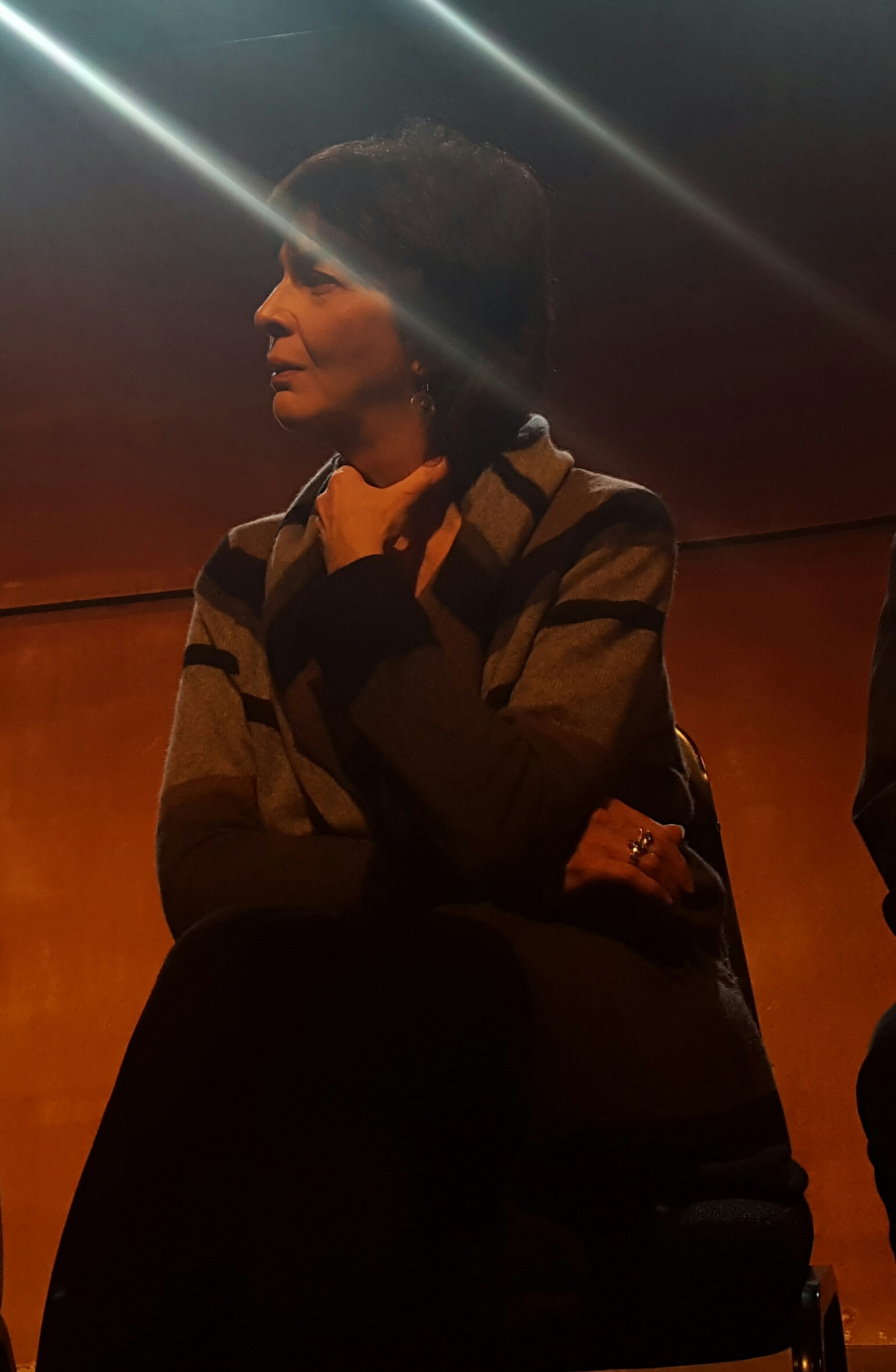
- Born: May 15, 1955 (age 69); Quebec City, Quebec, Canada
- Occupation: Actress
- Years active: 1980s-present

Micheline Bernard (born May 15, 1955) is a Canadian actress. She is most noted for her performances in the films Small Blind (La mise à l'aveugle), for which she received a Jutra Award nomination for Best Actress at the 15th Jutra Awards in 2013, and Matthias & Maxime, for which she won the Prix Iris for Best Supporting Actress at the 22nd Quebec Cinema Awards in 2020.

Born and raised in Quebec City, she is a 1977 graduate of the Conservatoire d'art dramatique de Québec.

Her other roles have included the films The Sphinx (Le Sphinx), Red Eyes (Les Yeux rouges), The Three Madeleines (Les fantômes des trois Madeleines), 8:17 p.m. Darling Street (20h17 rue Darling), It's Not Me, I Swear! (C'est pas moi, je le jure!), Crying Out (À l'origine d'un cri), King Dave, A Brother's Love (La Femme de mon frère), Richelieu and Humanist Vampire Seeking Consenting Suicidal Person (Vampire humaniste cherche suicidaire consentant), the television series Radio Enfer, Diva, Ramdam, Tactik, Unité 9 and Entre deux draps, and roles on stage.

She is the cousin of actor Denis Bernard.
