= The Thawing of Ice =

2024 Canadian drama film

- French: La Fonte des glaces
- Directed by: François Péloquin
- Written by: François Péloquin; Sarah Lévesque
- Produced by: Ziad Touma
- Starring: Christine Beaulieu; Lothaire Bluteau
- Cinematography: François Messier-Rheault
- Edited by: Carina Baccanale
- Music by: Mathieu Charbonneau
- Production company: Couzin Films
- Distributed by: Maison 4:3
- Release date: March 14, 2024
- Running time: 106 minutes
- Country: Canada
- Language: French

The Thawing of Ice (French: La Fonte des glaces) is a Canadian drama film, directed by François Péloquin and released in 2024. The film stars Christine Beaulieu as Louise Denoncourt, a parole officer who runs an experimental rehabilitation program for murder convicts who are nearing eligibility for parole, but who faces challenges when evidence emerges that Marc St-Germain (Lothaire Bluteau), one of the criminals in her program, may have committed the still-unsolved murder of her mother.

The cast also includes Marc Béland, Étienne Lou, Pierre-Paul Alain, Jean-Luc Kanapé, Abdelghafour Elaaziz and Ayana O'Shun.

The film premiered at the Cinéma du Musée in Montreal on March 14, 2024, before opening commercially on March 22.
