= Fractured Land =

- Directed by: Damien Gillis; Fiona Rayher
- Written by: Daniel Conrad; Fiona Rayher
- Produced by: Damien Gillis; Fiona Rayher
- Cinematography: Damien Gillis; Adam Myhill
- Edited by: Jocelyn Chaput
- Music by: Edo Van Breemen
- Production company: Two Island Films
- Release date: April 28, 2015 (Hot Docs)
- Running time: 75 minutes
- Country: Canada
- Language: English

Fractured Land is a 2015 Canadian feature documentary film directed by Fiona Rayher and Damien Gillis, profiling the Dené activist Caleb Behn as he goes through law school and builds a movement around greater awareness of hydraulic fracturing (fracking) on First Nations lands.

== Production ==
The film was in a crowd-source funding drive as of early 2013.

== Release ==
The film had its world premiere on 28 April 2015 at the Hot Docs Canadian International Documentary Festival.

== Awards ==
At the 2015 Hot Docs Canadian International Documentary Festival, the film finished 7th in the audience balloting.

At the 2015 Vancouver International Film Festival, the BC Spotlight jury awarded Fractured Land the award for Best BC Film, and the film won the VIFF Impact: Canadian Audience Award.

== See also ==
- Hydraulic fracturing in Canada
