= Mad Dog and the Butcher =

2019 Canadian documentary film

- French: Les Derniers vilains
- Directed by: Thomas Rinfret
- Written by: Annick Charlebois; Thomas Rinfret; Paul Rollins
- Produced by: Vito G. Balenzano; Valérie Bissonnette; Bruno Rosato
- Starring: Maurice "Mad Dog" Vachon; Paul "Butcher" Vachon
- Cinematography: Dominic Dorval; Vincent Masse; Thomas Rinfret; Richard Tremblay
- Edited by: Benoit Côté; Thomas Rinfret
- Music by: Joseph Marchand
- Production companies: Breakout Entertainment; Vélocité International
- Distributed by: Spira
- Release date: September 21, 2019 (FCVQ)
- Running time: 94 minutes
- Country: Canada

Mad Dog and the Butcher (French: Les Derniers vilains) is a Canadian documentary film, directed by Thomas Rinfret and released in 2019. The film is a portrait of the Vachon family of professional wrestlers, including Maurice "Mad Dog" Vachon and Paul "Butcher" Vachon.

The film premiered at the Quebec City Film Festival (FCVQ) in September 2019.

== Awards ==
At the FCVQ, the film won the Prix Jury cinéphile for best first film.

The film received three Prix Iris nominations at the 22nd Quebec Cinema Awards in 2020, for Best Documentary Film, Best Cinematography in a Documentary (Dominic Dorval, Vincent Masse, Thomas Rinfret, Richard Tremblay) and Best Editing in a Documentary (Benoit Côté, Thomas Rinfret).
