= Jean-Luc Kanapé =

Innu activist and actor from Canada

Jean-Luc Kanapé is an Innu activist and actor from Canada, most prominent as a caribou conservationist. A researcher for the Pessamit Innu Band council, he is involved in efforts to track and monitor the population of caribou in the Pipmuacan region near Pessamit and Baie-Comeau.

In 2021, he received an emerging leadership award from the First Nations Guardians Gathering, an organization of Indigenous environmentalists and conservationists.

He had his first acting role in the 2021 film Nouveau Québec, for which he received a Canadian Screen Award nomination for Best Supporting Performance in a Film at the 11th Canadian Screen Awards in 2023.

In 2024, he appeared in François Péloquin's film The Thawing of Ice (La fonte des glaces).

In fall 2024 he launched Sous les barrages (Under the Dams): Tshishe Manikuan, a seven-episode podcast about Innu history, through Ici Radio-Canada. He won the award for Best Narrative Audio production at the 2025 imagineNATIVE Film and Media Arts Festival.
