= Alexander Odyssey =

- French: Alexandre le fou
- Directed by: Pedro Pires
- Written by: Pedro Pires; Josiane Lapointe
- Produced by: Pedro Pires; Sylvia de Angelis
- Cinematography: Pedro Pires
- Edited by: Pedro Pires; Sophie Leblond; Sylvia de Angelis
- Music by: Sylvain Brassard; Gaël Poisson Lemay
- Production company: Pedro Pires Films
- Distributed by: Maison 4:3
- Release date: September 15, 2019 (FCVQ)
- Running time: 90 minutes
- Country: Canada
- Language: French

Alexander Odyssey (French: Alexandre le fou) is a Canadian documentary film, directed by Pedro Pires and released in 2019. The film premiered at the Quebec City Film Festival on September 15, 2019, before premiering commercially on September 20.

== Plot ==
The film centres on Alexandre Demard, a man who is at a new crossroads in his life 15 years after first experiencing a mental breakdown which led to his being diagnosed with schizophrenia.

== Awards ==
The film received three Canadian Screen Award nominations at the 8th Canadian Screen Awards in 2020, for Best Feature Length Documentary, Best Cinematography in a Documentary (Pires) and Best Editing in a Documentary (Pires, Sophie Leblond and Sylvia de Angelis). It also received four Prix Iris nominations at the 22nd Quebec Cinema Awards, for Best Documentary, Best Cinematography in a Documentary, Best Editing in a Documentary and Best Sound in a Documentary. It won the Canadian Screen Award for Best Editing.
