= Julien Élie =

Canadian film director

Julien Élie is a Canadian documentary filmmaker from Quebec, most noted for his films Dark Suns (Soleils noirs) and The White Guard (La Guardia blanca).

He began his career with a supporting role as Pierre in the 1984 film The Dog Who Stopped the War (La Guerre des tuques), but later worked as a boom operator on films rather than continuing an acting career.

He released his first documentary film, The One Who Knew (Celui qui savait), in 2001. The film centred on the investigation into the assassination of Rwandan politician Seth Sendashonga. He followed up with The Last Meal (Le Dernier repas), about prisoners on death row in Texas, in 2003.

Dark Suns and The White Guard both focused on the issue of violent crime in Mexico.

His newest film, Shifting Baselines, premiered at the 2025 edition of the Visions du Réel documentary film festival.

== Filmography ==
- The One Who Knew (Celui qui savait) - 2001
- The Last Meal (Le Dernier repas) - 2003
- Dark Suns (Soleils noirs) - 2018
- The White Guard (La Guardia blanca) - 2023
- Shifting Baselines - 2025

== Awards ==
Award	Date	Category	Recipient	Result	Ref.
DOXA Documentary Film Festival	2019	Colin Low Award	Dark Suns (Soleils noirs)	Honored	
Filmfest Hamburg	2019	Sichtwechsel Film Award	Dark Suns (Soleils noirs)	Won	
Montreal International Documentary Festival	2018	Grand Prize, National Feature	Dark Suns (Soleils noirs)	Won	
Montreal International Documentary Festival	2023	Magnus Isacsson Award	The White Guard (La Guardia blanca)	Won	
Montreal International Documentary Festival	2023	Student Jury Award	The White Guard (La Guardia blanca)	Won	
Prix Iris	2020	Best Documentary Film	Dark Suns (Soleils noirs)	Nominated	
