= Sarah Lévesque =

Canadian screenwriter

Sarah Lévesque is a Canadian screenwriter from Quebec. She is most noted as cowriter with her husband François Péloquin of the 2024 film The Thawing of Ice (La fonte des glaces), for which they received a Canadian Screen Award nomination for Best Original Screenplay at the 13th Canadian Screen Awards in 2025.

Her other credits have included the films The Sound of Trees (Le Bruit des arbres), Rodeo (Rodéo) and At the End of Nothing At All (Au boute du rien pantoute), and episodes of the television series Maman la mitraille and Alertes.
