= Guillaume Vigneault =

Canadian novelist

Guillaume Vigneault (born August 5, 1970 in Montreal, Quebec) is a Canadian novelist. He is the son of Gilles Vigneault.

== Education and career ==
When he was young, his favourite writers were Albert Camus, Ernest Hemingway and Fyodor Dostoyevsky. He is a musician and used to be a bartender in a pub next to his university campus near the Plateau Mont-Royal. After receiving a bachelor's degree in literary studies at the Université du Québec à Montréal and beginning a master's degree in the same subject, he decided to pursue a career as a novelist.

His novel Chercher le Vent was published in October 2001. In 2003 it was published in English by Douglas & McIntyre, under the title Necessary Betrayals.

In 2005 he participated in the Dictée des Amériques. He wrote the screenplay for the 2016 film Wild Run: The Legend (Chasse-Galerie: La Légende), the first feature film adaptation of the legend of Chasse-galerie.

In 2020, Vigneault, Guillaume de Fontenay and Jean Barbe received a Canadian Screen Award nomination for Best Adapted Screenplay at the 8th Canadian Screen Awards, and a Prix Iris nomination for Best Screenplay at the 22nd Quebec Cinema Awards, for the film Sympathy for the Devil (Sympathie pour le diable).

== Books ==
- Carnets de naufrage (Diary of a Shipwreck), Boréal, 2000
- Chercher le vent (Necessary Betrayals), Boréal, 2001
