= Mimi Allard =

Canadian sound editor and composer

Mimi Allard is a Canadian sound editor and composer from Quebec. She is most noted for her work on the documentary film The White Guard (La Garde blanche), for which she won the Prix Iris for Best Original Music in a Documentary at the 26th Quebec Cinema Awards in 2024.

As a sound editor, she was a Golden Reel Award nominee for Sound Effects and Foley for Feature Film in 2017 as part of the sound team for Arrival, and a Prix Iris nominee for Best Sound at the 21st Quebec Cinema Awards in 2019 for Allure.

She has also created work as a sound artist for Montreal's MUTEK art festival.

== Filmography ==
=== Composing ===
- The Sound of Trees (Le Bruit des arbres) - 2015
- Far Away Lands (Les Terres lointaines) - 2017
- Dark Suns (Soleils noirs) - 2018
- The White Guard (La Garde blanche) - 2023

=== Sound editing ===
- Turbo Kid - 2015
- My Internship in Canada (Guibord s'en va-t-en guerre) - 2015
- Endorphine - 2015
- Before the Streets (Avant les rues) - 2016
- Arrival - 2016
- Chuck - 2016
- Game Fever - 2016
- Abu: Father - 2017
- Allure - 2017
- Venus - 2017
- Anote's Ark - 2018
- Laila at the Bridge - 2018
- The Far Shore (Dérive) - 2018
- Dark Suns (Soleils noirs) - 2018
- Train Hopper - 2019
- Big Little Lies - 2019
- The Morning Show - 2019
