= Ernesto Pardo =

Ernesto Pardo is a Mexican cinematographer, most noted for his work on documentary films.

== Filmography ==
- Como un extraño - 1999
- La linea - 2000
- Miss Carrusel - 2004
- El lugar más pequeño - 2011
- El Cuarto desnudo - 2013
- Rosario - 2013
- The Empty Classroom (El aula vacía) - 2014
- Ausencias - 2015
- Alice Beyond the Abyss - 2015
- Tempestad - 2016
- Guerrero - 2017
- Agave: The Spirit of a Nation - 2018
- Pauline Julien, Intimate and Political (Pauline Julien: intime et politique) - 2018
- Why Kill Them? - 2018
- Dark Suns (Soleils noirs) - 2019
- La Vocera - 2020
- Vivos - 2020
- Gods of Mexico - 2022
- Trigal - 2022
- The White Guard (La Guardia blanca) - 2023
- The Echo (El Eco) - 2023
- Toshkua - 2023

== Awards ==
| Award | Year | Category | Work | Result | Ref(s) |
|---|---|---|---|---|---|
| American Society of Cinematographers | 2016 | Spotlight Award | Tempestad | Nominated | |
| Fénix Awards | 2016 | Best Documentary Cinematography | Tempestad | Won | |
| Ariel Awards | 2017 | Best Cinematography | Tempestad | Won | |
| Prix Iris | 2020 | Best Cinematography in a Documentary | Dark Suns (Soleils noirs) | Nominated | |
| Camerimage | 2023 | Golden Frog for Best Cinematography in a Documentary | The Echo (El Eco) | Won | |
| Canadian Screen Awards | 2024 | Best Cinematography in a Documentary | The White Guard (La Guardia blanca) | Nominated | |
