= Vivos (film) =

2020 documentary film

- Film poster
- Directed by: Ai Weiwei
- Produced by: Ai Weiwei
- Cinematography: Ernesto Pardo; Carlos F. Rossini; Bruno Santamaría Razo; Ai Weiwei; Ma Yan
- Edited by: Niels Pagh Andersen
- Music by: Jens Bjørnkjær
- Production company: AWW Germany GmbH
- Release date: January 24, 2020 (Sundance)
- Running time: 112 minutes
- Countries: Germany; Mexico
- Languages: English; Spanish

Vivos is a German-Mexican documentary film that premiered at the 2020 Sundance Film Festival on January 24, 2020. It was directed by Ai Weiwei. It is about the mass-kidnapping of students from the Ayotzinapa Rural Teachers' College in 2014. Using meditative photography and intimate interviews, artist and filmmaker Ai Wei Wei tells the stories of the Ayotzinapa victims. Focusing on the families directly affected by the deaths and disappearances, Ai Weiwei gives expression to an unsolved humanitarian crisis. The film is in English and Spanish with English subtitles and runs for 112 minutes. It is produced by AWW Germany GmbH and Cinephil is handling worldwide sales.

== Production ==
In an interview, Ai Weiwei stated his focus was not to create investigative journalism, or to figure out what happened in Iguala. He aimed to answer the question: When a family member doesn't return, what kind of trauma does the Mexican society and culture undergo? How does this hurt social justice and the nation? In an interview with NPR, Ai Weiwei described how this film came from a desire to understand more about Mexican culture and politics.

== Reception ==
Variety writes about how the film build from the sorrow into a focus on activism itself. Cassell described the most rewarding takeaway as how some of the parents become part of a growing movement for justice rather than information already covered by media. One of Ai Weiwei's 2 other films produced in 2020 (Cockroach) was listed as one of ARTnews's top 10 art documentaries of 2020.
