= Guillaume de Fontenay =

Canadian film director and screenwriter

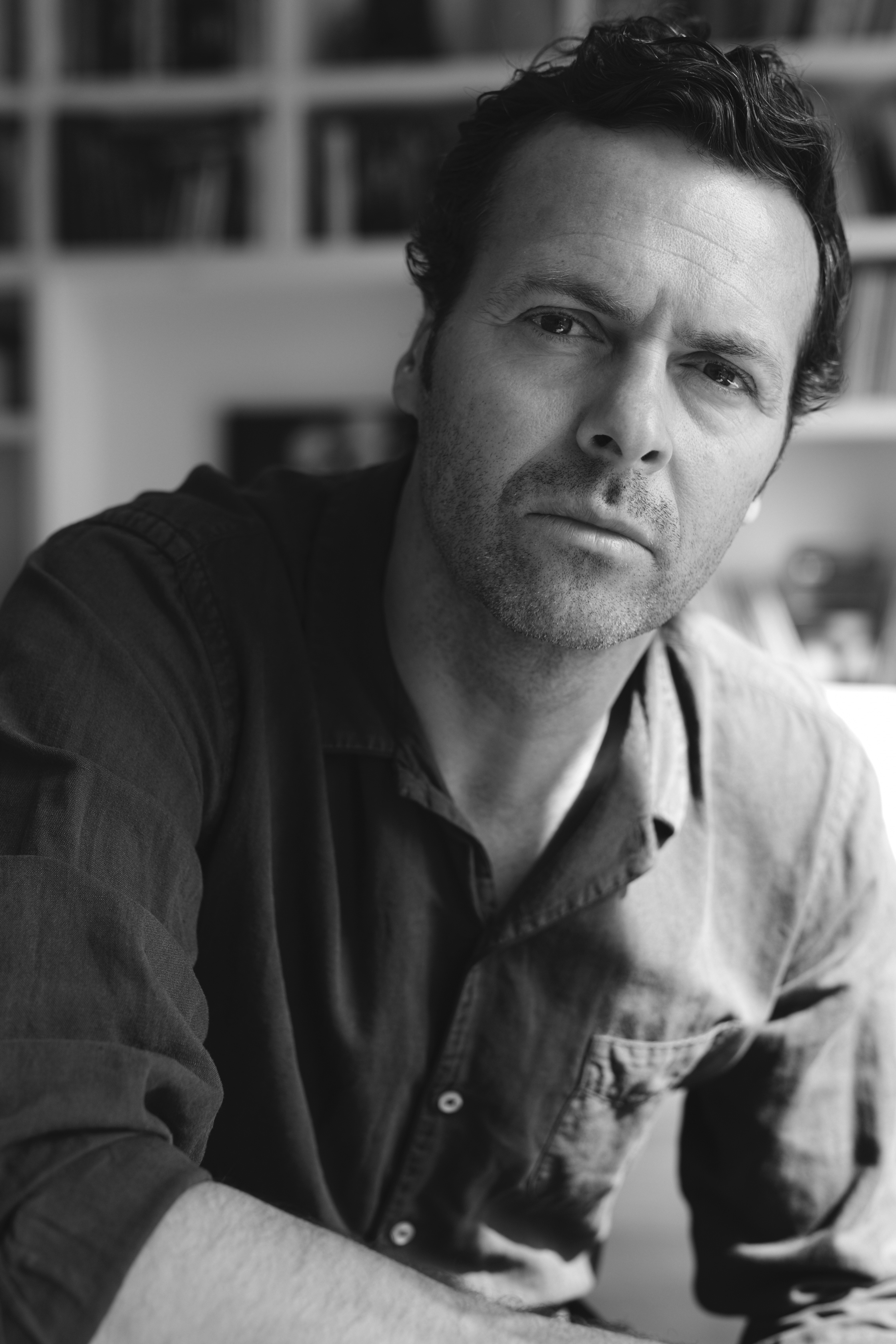
Guillaume de Fontenay

Guillaume de Fontenay (born March 6, 1969) is a Canadian film director and screenwriter from Montreal, Quebec. He is most noted for his feature film debut Sympathy for the Devil (Sympathie pour le diable), which received three Canadian Screen Award nominations at the 8th Canadian Screen Awards in 2020.

Prior to releasing Sympathy for the Devil, de Fontenay worked primarily in theatre and advertising, and directed the short film Le Retour triptyque in 2012. He first signed on to direct Sympathy for the Devil in the mid-2000s after reading war correspondent Paul Marchand's book, but the film was delayed by various production complications, including Marchand's death in 2009, and was not completed or released until 2019.

At the Canadian Screen Awards, de Fontenay was nominated alongside Guillaume Vigneault and Jean Barbe for Best Adapted Screenplay, and the film was also nominated for the John Dunning Best First Feature Award. Vigneault, Barbe and de Fontenay also received a Prix Iris nomination for Best Screenplay at the 22nd Quebec Cinema Awards, where de Fontenay was also a nominee for Best Director.
