= Douglas Grégoire =

Canadian actor

Douglas Grégoire (born August 27, 1996) is an Innu actor and filmmaker from Quebec. He is most noted for his performance in the film Kuessipan, for which he received a Canadian Screen Award nomination for Best Supporting Actor at the 8th Canadian Screen Awards.
