= Golden Kingdom =

- Golden Kingdom Movie Poster
- Directed by: Brian Perkins
- Written by: Brian Perkins
- Screenplay by: Brian Perkins
- Produced by: Brian Perkins; Jessica Ballard; Matt O'Connor
- Starring: U Zawtica; Shine Htet Zaw; Ko Yin Saw Ri; Ko Yin Than Maung; Ko Yin Maung Sein
- Cinematography: Bella Halben
- Edited by: Sebastian Bonde
- Music by: David C. Hughes
- Production companies: Bank & Shoal
- Distributed by: Kino Lorber
- Release date: October 13, 2015 (United States)
- Running time: 104 minutes
- Countries: United States; Myanmar
- Language: Burmese
- Box office: $8,077

Golden Kingdom is a 2015 Burmese-language drama film directed by Brian Perkins. The film tells the story of four young Buddhist monks and their life in a Buddhist monastery. The film is set and filmed entirely on location in Myanmar. Golden Kingdom is the first international feature film produced in Myanmar between its 2011-2015 reopening and the most recent military coup.

== Synopsis ==
Nestled in the mountains of Myanmar, sits a Buddhist monastery inhabited by Sayadaw, the abbot of the monastery, and four young monks; Koyin Witazara, Koyin Wezananda, Koyin Thiridema and Koyin Awadadema. One day, Sayadaw learns that he must travel away on personal matters and leave the monastery for a while and leave the four young monks alone to fend for themselves. Before he leaves, he puts Koyin Witazara, the eldest of the group, in charge. With Sayadaw gone, the four struggle to put food on the table while confronting their fears and internal demons.

== Characters ==
- Sayadaw (U Zawtica)
- Koyin Witazara (Shine Htet Zaw)
- Koyin Wezananda (Koyin Saw Ri)
- Koyin Thiridema (Koyin Than Maung)
- Koyin Awadadema (Koyin Maung Sein)

== Production ==
The film was filmed on location in Myanmar.

Three of the four young monks depicted in the film are real-life apprentice monks while U Zawtica who play Sayadaw is also himself a real-life Buddhist sayadaw.

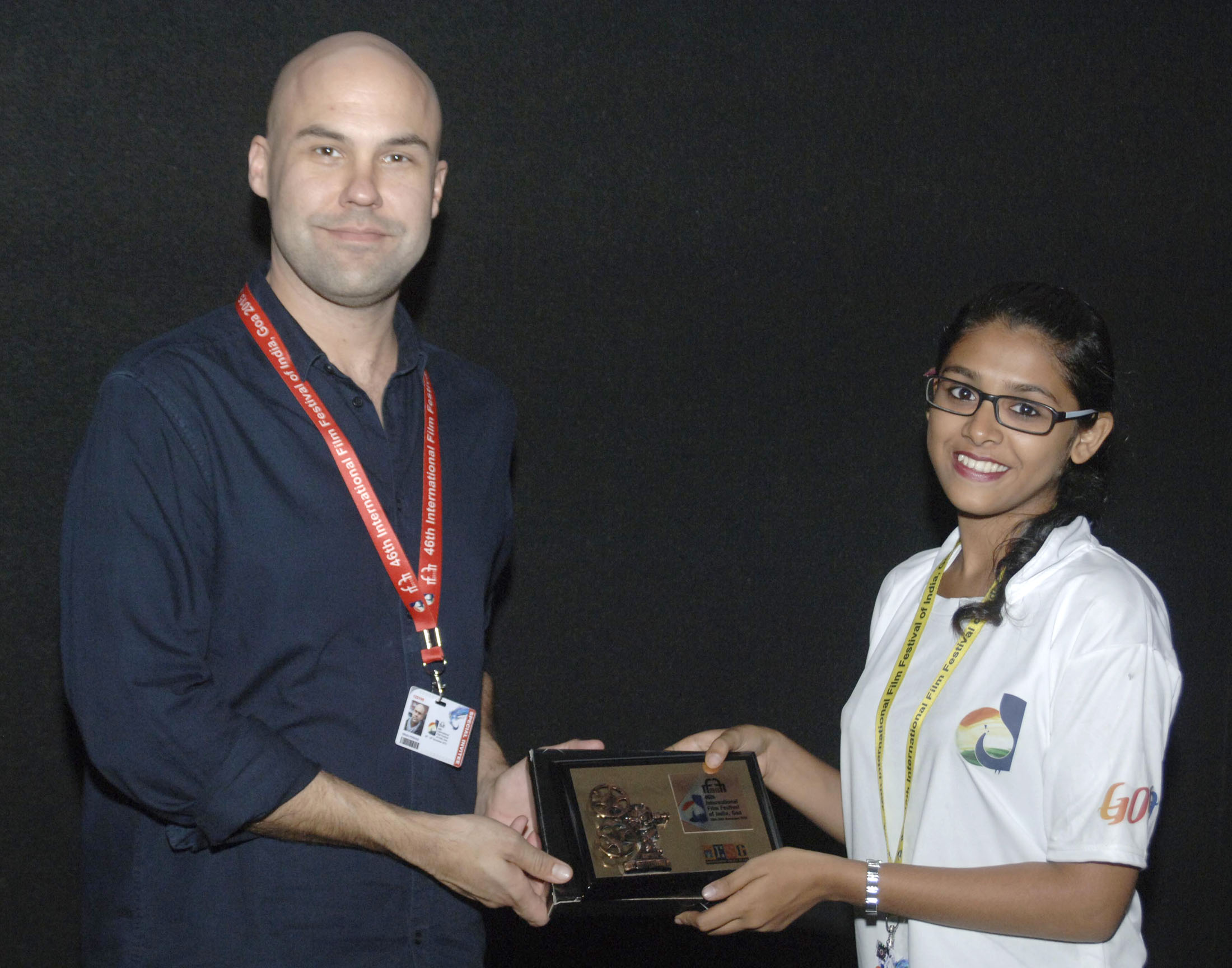
Director Brian Perkins, being felicitated at IFFI (2015)
