= Robin Maxkii =

Director and filmmaker

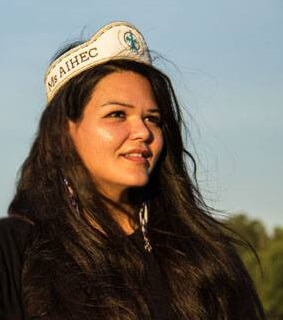
- Robin Maxkii in February 2016
- Born: November 8, 1990 (age 35)
- Occupations: writer; filmmaker; activist
- Years active: 2014–present

Robin Maxkii (born November 8, 1990) is a Native American technology activist, filmmaker, and writer. Maxkii is known primarily for her work on broadening the participation of Native Americans in education and technology. She co-starred in the Microsoft-funded PBS series "Code Trip" showcasing diversity within the technology industry. In 2016 Máxkii organized and directed the first national American Indian collegiate hackathon, focused on addressing the digital divide and access to technology in rural and under served communities. Two years later, Google launched a documentary about her journey in technology.

== Personal life ==
Robin Máxkii is of Stockbridge-Munsee, Navajo, Mohican and Spanish descent. Maxkii taught herself to code using public library computers from the age of eleven and began running various websites utilizing free Web hosting services. In 2014 Maxkii graduated from Diné College, a tribal college, and later Salish Kootenai College located on the Flathead Indian Reservation.

== Career ==
=== 2014–2018: Early work ===
In 2014, her blogging network "Blood Quantum Reform" was shortlisted to join the United Nations Global Partnership for Youth. Maxkii used her blog to raise awareness on issues within Indian country primarily related to blood quantum, education access, and tribal sovereignty.

Around 2014, while still a tribal college student, she co-produced and narrated a segment of the Navajo Oral History project which is now archived in the Smithsonian.

In 2015, she was invited to introduce Jill Biden at a national Conference. Biden praised Maxkii's writing, encouraging people to read her work.

Maxkii had participated in a number of hackathons before being cast in the Microsoft funded documentary series Code_Trip, which premiered nationally in 2016. She, along with two other people, traveled across the country interviewing people in the technology industry. Maxkii used this platform to gain support for events focused on American Indians in technology.

In November 2016, Maxkii successfully directed the first national American Indian Collegiate hackathon, focused on addressing the digital divide and access to the Internet by rural and underserved communities.

=== 2018–present ===
In 2018, Google produced and launched a documentary about her journey in technology for their 20th anniversary. Marking only the 2nd time a living Native American featured on the Google Homepage.

Highlighting diversity in technology and celebrating sisterhood, Maxkii appeared on the Girls Who Code "Sisterh>>d" album, which also featured tracks by Lizzo, Tiffany Gouché, and DJ Khalil. It launched on October 11, 2018.

=== The American Indian College Fund and work with Indigenous rights ===
Maxkii was named an ambassador to the American Indian College Fund (AICF) in 2016, and began work with the 'Think Indian' campaign. The AICF 'Think Indian' campaign seeks to "tell the story of how America’s 32 accredited tribal colleges and American Indian students are combining traditional Native solutions with modern knowledge to solve contemporary problems." She has spoken out on education disparity, including speaking before the United States Senate Committee on Indian Affairs, and has advocated for equal opportunity among students of color, Indigenous students in particular. She also appeared in a series of ads for the College Fund which included a billboard spot in New York's Times Square.

== Literary works ==
Contributor to Tribal College Journal, The Chronicle of Higher Education, Michelle Obama's Better Make Room campaign, and various online publications. She was a recipient of the Native American Journalists Association Award in 2018.

== Awards ==
Her work has also earned various awards including invitations to events at the White House under the Obama Administration. In 2016 she was nominated to attend the United State of Women Summit hosted by the White House as a changemaker.
