= Yamie Grégoire =

Canadian actress

Yamie Grégoire is an Innu actress from Quebec. She is most noted for her performance in the film Kuessipan (2019), for which she received a Canadian Screen Award nomination for Best Supporting Actress at the 8th Canadian Screen Awards.
