= François Messier-Rheault =

Canadian cinematographer

François Messier-Rheault is a Canadian cinematographer. He is most noted for his work on Denis Côté's 2017 film A Skin So Soft (Ta peau si lisse), for which he won the Prix Iris for Best Cinematography in a Documentary at the 20th Quebec Cinema Awards in 2018.

He was also a nominee in the same category at the 22nd Quebec Cinema Awards in 2020 for Dark Suns (Soleils noirs), and for Best Cinematography at the 21st Quebec Cinema Awards in 2019 for Ghost Town Anthology (Repertoire des villes disparues). He has also received a Canadian Screen Award nomination for Best Cinematography in a Documentary, for his work on the film Diary of a Father (Journal d'un père), at the 13th Canadian Screen Awards in 2025.

His other credits have included the films Land of Men (Terre des hommes), Little Brother (Petit frère), The Sound of Trees (Le Bruit des arbres), Wilcox, Heart Bomb (Une bombe au cœur), Social Hygiene (Hygiène social), That Kind of Summer (Un été comme ça), Making Babies (Faire un enfant), The Thawing of Ice (La Fonte des glaces), Vile & Miserable (Vil & Misérable), Shifting Baselines and Cardboard City (Ville Jacques-Carton).
