= Maxim Lemire =

Canadian strongman and professional wrestler

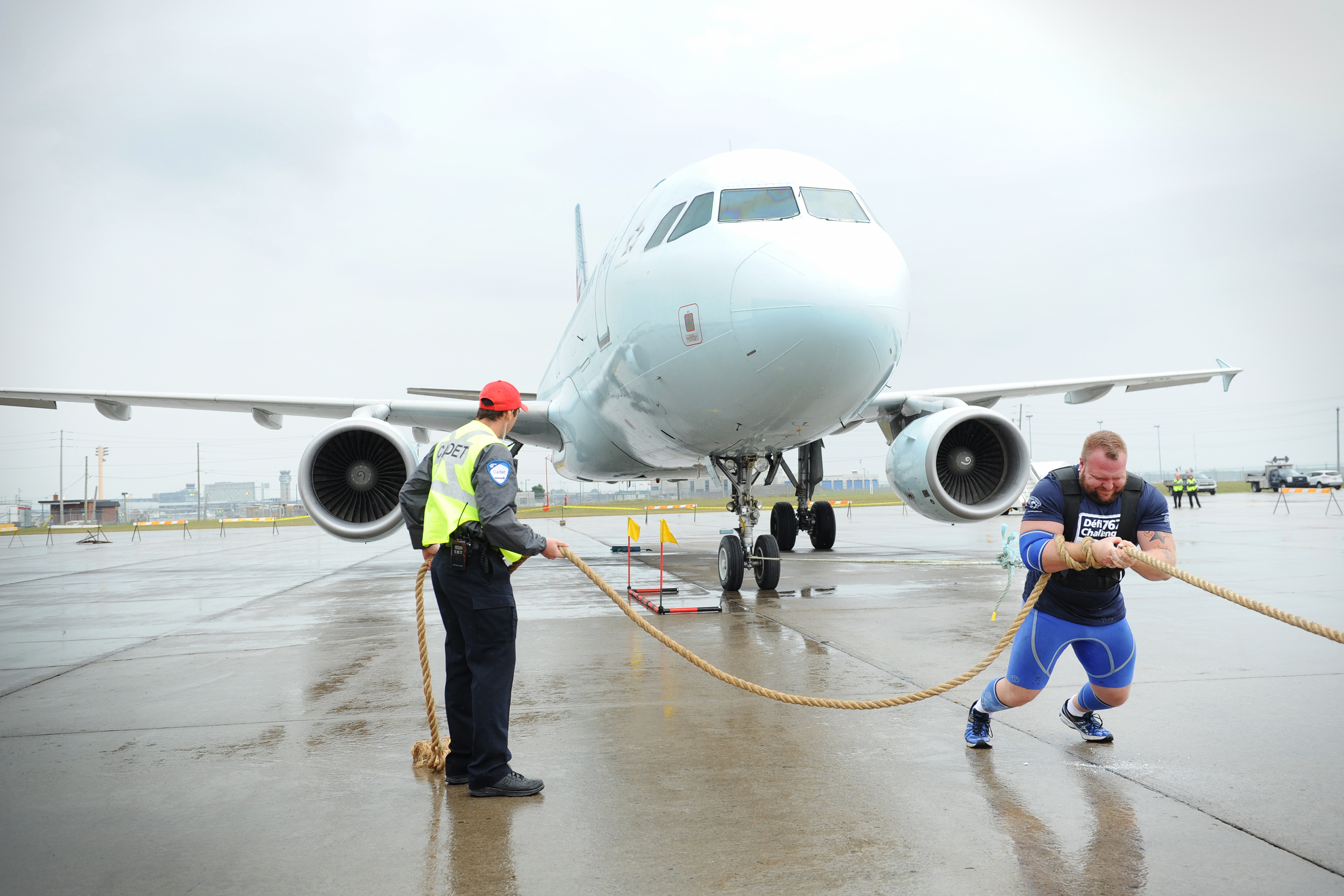
- Pulling an airplane in 2014 for the Special Olympics
- Born: March 30, 1981 (age 44); Notre-Dame-du-Mont-Carmel, Quebec, Canada
- Other names: MaxxxL; Maxxx Testosterone; Maxim "Hollywood" Lemire
- Occupations: Strongman, professional wrestling
- Height: 6 ft 2 in (188 cm)

Maxim Lemire (born March 30, 1982) is a Canadian strongman and professional wrestler.

== Early life ==
Lemire was born in Notre-Dame-du-Mont-Carmel on March 30, 1981. He lived there until his family moved to Trois-Rivières when he was in the third grade.

== Football and bodybuilding career ==
In 1996 and 1997, Lemire played defensive end for his high school football team, Lions de Chavigny. In 1996, he also played on the Benjamin Junior Team. In 1998, he made the collegiate AAA team Diablos, of Trois-rivieres, where he was on the reserve player roster. In 1999, he quit football in order to become a police officer.

In 2005, he finished 2nd in the heavyweight class of the Mr. Mauricie, an amateur bodybuilding contest. In 2007, he won the heavyweight class of the same contest. In 2008, he placed 5th in the heavyweight class of the Quebec de l'est bodybuilding show.

In 2009, while Lemire was in contest preparation for the bodybuilding division of the World Police and Fire Games, he was injured and required emergency surgery, after which he began training for strongman competitions.

== Strongman career ==
2009

St. Adelforce, 12th place

St. Albert, Festival sportif, 6th place

St. Celestin, Festival du blé d'inde, 7th place

Rimouski, Compétition en équipe, 3rd place

St. Raphael, Compétition de la relève, 2nd place

2010

St. Felicien, Expo agricole, Coupe du Quebec Semi. Pro, 10th place

St. Anselme, 8th place

St. Albert, Festival sportif, 4th place

Amos coupe du Quebec Semi. Pro, 9th place

Mont Tremblant, Championnat Provincial, 12th place

St. Celestin, Festival du blé d'inde, Blessé

2011

Montreal Strongest man, 7th place

Championnat Provincial de log press

Beauport, Semi-Pro, 4th place

Shannon, Coupe du Québec, Semi Pro, 5th place

Amos, Coupe du Québec, Semi Pro, 8th place

Warwick, Festival hommes forts Semi-Pro, 2nd place

Montreal, Championnat Provincial, 10th place

Dubreuilville, Ontario, Strongman Challenge PRO, 10th place

2012

Montreal Strongest Man, 6th place

Amqui, Hommes forts dans la vallé Semi-Pro, 2nd place

Quebec, Coupe Hard-Gym Semi-Pro, 3rd place

Warwick, Festival homes forts Semi-Pro, 4th place

Shannon, Championnat Provincial, 8th place

Kitchenner (ON), Bavarian Strongest man contest, 8th place

2013

Sherbrooke, Strongman champion league Canada, PRO, 10th place

Amqui, homes forts dans la vallé, Semi-Pro, 4th place

Warwick, festival hommes forts, Semi-Pro, 2nd place

Shannon, Championnat provincial, 9th place

Shipshaw, Coupe du Québec, Semi Pro, 3rd place

Dubreuilville (ON), Strongman challenge PRO, 12th place

2014 (Circuit Semi-Profesionnel)

Ste. Sophie, Coupe du Québec, Semi Pro, 6th place

Ste. Foy, Coupe du Québec, Semi Pro, 7th place

Nemisquau, Coupe du Québec, Semi Pro, 5th place

Shannon, Championnat Provincial, 7th place

2015 (Circuit Profesionnel)

St. Odilon, Championnat provincial, 8th place

Charlevoix, Rodéo Charlevoix, circuit PRO, 8th place

Ste. Julienne, Expo agricole, circuit PRO, 8th place

Upton, Toxico Gite, Circuit PRO, 11th place

Trois-Rivières, Expo agricole, circuit PRO, 12th place

Ste. Sophie de Levrard, 8th place

Quebec, ouverture du centre videotron, Inrury

In 2015, Fort Comme un Roc (English: Strong as a Rock), filmed during the 2013 season, aired on television. This was a show about 5 Canadian strongman, Jean-François Caron, Louis-Philippe Jean, Christian Savoie, Paul "Shorty" Vaillancourt, and Maxim Lemire. This show featured a look into their lives, including their jobs, training, and contests.

In 2016, Lemire retired from strongman competition following a complete quadriceps rupture. He still does occasional demonstrations for charity events.

== Professional wrestling career ==
When Lemire was 17 years old, he participated in his first wrestling show. He began training with Rejean Desaulnier, in Shawinigan, in the FCL (Federation Canadienne de lutte) training facility. He wrestled in this promotion under the name Samael and then Maxxx Testosterone. He also wrestled in a few local promotions before retiring from the ring. Later on, he wrestled 2 times for an agent in St-Basile. He had a comeback match in the FCL in 2009.

In 2015, Lemire had a return match during an XQW charity event, defeating Jack Dundee by submission with a move called the backbreaker rack. On October 3, he returned, after a 7-year layoff, to the Shawinigan-based FCL. During that match he suffered a complete quadriceps tendon and patella rupture. He was rushed to the nearby hospital for emergency surgery. On October 6, he was cleared from the hospital and was advised that his strongman and wrestling career might be over and that there was possibility of his never recovering more than 60% of the use of his leg.

On April 23, 2016, he made his return to the ring, in St-Basile Quebec, teaming with former WWE star Sylvain Grenier to take on Brody Steele and MG Animal. His team eventually won the match. On May 7, he wrestled in a 6-man match in the LPQ, in Drummondville. He got eliminated at the end of the match, by John Dundee and Jayson Reaper. On May 14, he returned to FCL to Face the Hellraisers, with Razor Revolution as his partner. They won the match with an F-5 finishing move. On June 4, he wrestled again with Razor Revolution in the FCL promotion against the tag team Genesis. Genesis won the match. On June 25, he make his GNW Great North wrestling debut in Pembroke, Ontario, in a no DQ match against Hannibal for the Canadian Heavyweight Championship. He lost the match to Hannibal by Pinfall. On July 9, he won a match against Alex North with the F-5 in Bécancour, Quebec, this was the main-event of the night. On July 16, he teamed with Kady James, in his hometown of Trois-Rivières, to defeat the team of Genesis after an F-5. The match was filmed for a movie by Denis Cote. On August 6, he defeated SOA Amin, after a Spear, in the main event of a show in St. Prosper de Beauce. On August 13, he defeated Thrax, in Drummondville Quebec, with a pin fall, after a Spear. On August 19, he made his CRW Montreal-based promotion debut, winning, after 40 seconds, in a match against Simon Easton. He later attacked Paul Rosenberg with a Spear and an F-5, allowing Velvet Jones to win the promotion Hardcore Title.

Since 2018, Lemire has been regularly wrestling for the International Wrestling Syndicate.

Lemire had a WWE tryout during SummerSlam (2019) weekend in Toronto.

== Filmography ==
Fort comme un Roc (2015 TV series, filmed 2013) Ta Peau Si lisse (release date March 2017, filmed 2016)

== Personal life ==
Lemire is now married and a father.

He gives motivational speeches in schools, and strength demonstrations for charity events such as the Special Olympics Canada.

Lemire has bipolar disorder and anxiety disorder.

== Records ==
=== Powerlifting records ===
Never performed in official powerlifting meet, only PR gym lift

- Squat – (710 lbs) Raw with band
- Bench press – (550lbs) raw
- Bench press – (650) Single-Ply suit
- Deadlift – (775 lbs)

=== Strongest man records ===
- Overhead Log Lift – (360 lbs) multiple contest
- Overhead Log Lift – (394 Lbs) Gym PR

=== Other feats ===
- Standing Overhead Press – (405 Lbs)
- Pulled an airbus of 172,000 lbs a few feet
