= Sophie Leblond =

Canadian film editor

Sophie Leblond is a Canadian film editor and director. She is most noted for her work on the films Soft Shell Man (Un crabe dans la tête), for which she won the Jutra Award for Best Editing at the 4th Jutra Awards in 2002, and Alexander Odyssey (Alexandre le fou), for which she won the Canadian Screen Award for Best Editing in a Documentary at the 8th Canadian Screen Awards in 2020.

She made her debut as a director with the forthcoming documentary film Lhasa, a profile of Canadian singer Lhasa de Sela.

== Awards and nominations ==
Year	Award	Work	Result	Ref(s)
1st Jutra Awards (1999)	Best Editing	August 32nd on Earth (Un 32 août sur terre)	Nominated	
3rd Jutra Awards (2001)	Best Editing	The Left-Hand Side of the Fridge (La moitié gauche du frigo)	Nominated	
4th Jutra Awards (2002)	Best Editing	Soft Shell Man (Un crabe dans la tête)	Won	
10th Jutra Awards (2008)	Best Editing	Continental, a Film Without Guns (Continental, un film sans fusil)	Nominated	
15th Jutra Awards (2013)	Best Editing	Inch'Allah	Nominated	
1st Canadian Screen Awards (2013)	Best Editing	Inch'Allah	Nominated	
8th Canadian Screen Awards (2020)	Best Editing in a Documentary	Alexander Odyssey (Alexandre le fou) — with Sylvia De Angelis and Pedro Pires	Won	
22nd Quebec Cinema Awards (2020)	Best Editing in a Documentary	Alexander Odyssey (Alexandre le fou) — with Sylvia De Angelis and Pedro Pires	Nominated	
24th Quebec Cinema Awards (2022)	Best Editing	Without Havana (Sin la Habana)	Pending	
