= Sharon Fontaine-Ishpatao =

Innu actress from Canada

Sharon Fontaine-Ishpatao is an Innu actress from Canada. She is most noted for her role in the film Kuessipan, for which she received a Prix Iris nomination for Revelation of the Year at the 22nd Quebec Cinema Awards in 2020.

She has also appeared in the television series Toute la vie and Les Perles, and on stage in Philippe Ducros's La cartomancie du territoire.
