= François Péloquin =

Canadian film director

François Péloquin is a Canadian film director from Quebec, who won the Emerging Canadian Director award at the 2015 Vancouver International Film Festival for his debut film The Sound of Trees (Le Bruit des arbres).

Originally from the Gaspésie region of Quebec, he studied political science at the Université du Québec à Montréal before turning to filmmaking. He was a competitor in the 1997–98 season of La Course destination monde, and subsequently directed music videos and television episodes before The Sound of Trees debuted in competition at the 50th Karlovy Vary International Film Festival.

His second film, The Thawing of Ice (La fonte des glaces), was released in 2024.

Both of his films were co-written with his wife, Sarah Lévesque. They received a Canadian Screen Award nomination for Best Original Screenplay at the 13th Canadian Screen Awards in 2025 for The Thawing of Ice.
