= Luo Li (director) =

Chinese-Canadian film director and screenwriter

Luo Li is an independent film director and screenwriter. He was born and grew up in China; he studied film and obtained his MFA in Canada.

== Career ==
Li's experimental short films Fly and Ornithology garnered recognition for their use of abstract imagery; they screened internationally in festivals/galleries including Cinematheque Ontario and Images Festival (both Toronto, Ontario, Canada), the Festival de Nouveau Cinema (Montreal, Quebec, Canada), and Reyes Hecoles Gallery (Mexico City, Mexico).

His first feature film, I went to the zoo the other day (2009), screened at the Buenos Aires International Festival of Independent Cinema in Argentina. His second feature film, Rivers and my father (2010) premiered at the 7th China Independent Film Festival (2010) and won the Jury Prize. It also won the Image Prize at Images Festival in 2011 and later screened at the Jeonju International Film Festival and the CPH:DOX (Denmark). His third feature film, Emperor Visits the Hell (2012) premiered at the Vancouver International Film Festival (2012) and won the Dragons and Tigers Award.

His fourth feature film, Li Wen at East Lake (2015), screened at the International Film Festival of Rotterdam and received critical acclaim; The Hollywood Reporter called it "A winning hybrid of documentary and drama, and of comedy and tragedy" and dubbed Li a "festival favorite." His work received a retrospective at the TIFF Bell Lightbox in Toronto in 2015.

== Influences and style ==
Cinemascope called him "one of the most interesting young Canadian directors on the international festival circuit, and one of the most promising Chinese independent directors to emerge in the last decade." They continued, saying: "Marked by narrative playfulness, implicitly subversive formal innovation, and elegant, beautifully crafted images, and pervaded by a remarkably gentle, unassuming confidence, his four features have already staked out something like a Luo Li universe."

=== filmography ===
name	year
Li Wen at East Lake	2015
Emperor Visits the Hell	2012
Rivers and My Father	2010
