= Pedro Pires (director) =

Canadian film director

Pedro Pires (born 1969 in Nantes, France) is a Canadian film director. His short film Danse Macabre won the award for Best Canadian Short Film at the 2009 Toronto International Film Festival and the Genie Award for Best Live Action Short Drama at the 30th Genie Awards, his short film Hope was a Genie Award nominee for Best Live Action Short Drama at the 32nd Genie Awards in 2012, and he was a Canadian Screen Award nominee for Best Director at the 2nd Canadian Screen Awards in 2014 for Triptych, which he co-directed with Robert Lepage.

His most recent film, the documentary Alexander Odyssey (Alexandre le fou), received three Canadian Screen Award nominations at the 8th Canadian Screen Awards in 2020, for Best Feature Length Documentary, Best Cinematography in a Documentary (Pires) and Best Editing in a Documentary (Pires, Sophie Leblond and Sylvia de Angelis).

He is also a visual effects technician and art director, whose credits have included several of Lepage's other films and the television series Charlie Jade.
