= Alice Cares =

2015 film directed by Sander Burger

Alice Cares is a 2015 Dutch documentary film directed by Sander Burger. It is a documentary film that explores how a new robot technology may be able to aid many senior citizens in the developing western world. The film premiered at the Vancouver International Film Festival in Vancouver, B.C., on 27 September 2015.
