= John Sitting Bull =

Stepson of Sitting Bull (c.1867–1955)

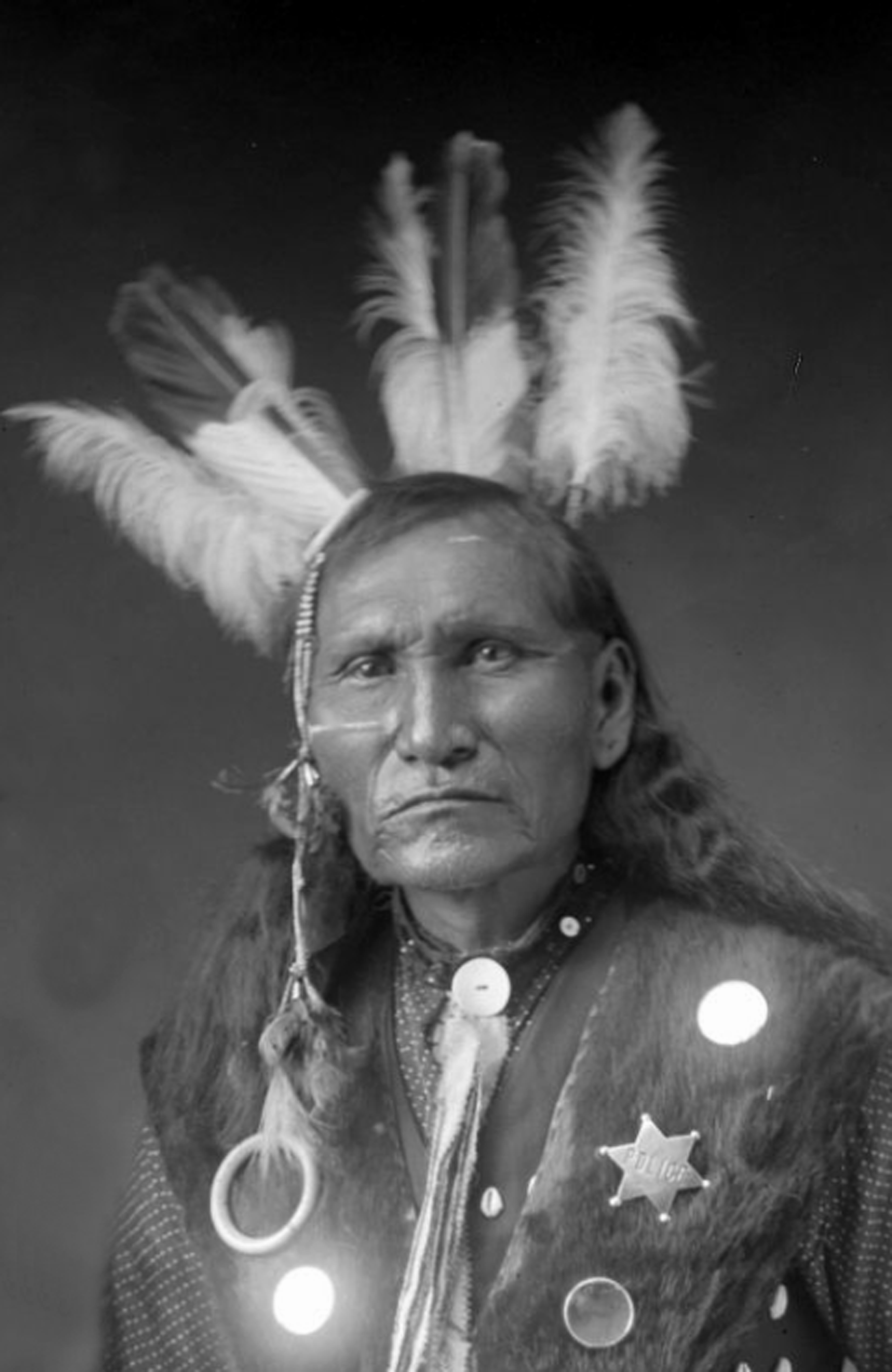
- John Sitting Bull in 1926 by David F. Barry
- Born: Refuses-them (Nurcan) ca. 1867; Northern Plains, US
- Died: June 10, 1955 (aged 88); Rapid City, South Dakota, US
- Occupations: Circus performer; actor; farmer
- Parents: Bear Louse (father); Seen-by-her-Nation-woman (mother)

John Sitting Bull (c. 1867 – June 10, 1955) was a Native American farmer, circus performer, and actor. Best known as the stepson of the Hunkpapa Lakota leader Sitting Bull, he lived a life that bridged traditional Lakota culture, the harsh realities of U.S. expansion, and the spectacle of Wild West entertainment.

== Early life ==
John Sitting Bull was born c. 1867 on the northern Great Plains region of the United States. His Lakota name was Nurcan, meaning “Refuses-them.” He was the son of Bear Louse and Seen-by-her-Nation-woman and was deaf and mute from birth. After his father’s death, his mother married the Hunkpapa chief Sitting Bull, who adopted John as his stepson.

== Years of conflict and relocation ==
In July 1881, Sitting Bull surrendered to the United States Army along with 186 family members and followers. John Sitting Bull was among those held as prisoners of war for two years at Fort Randall in Dakota Territory. In May 1883, the group was permitted to rejoin the Hunkpapa Lakota at the Standing Rock Sioux Reservation. The assassination of Sitting Bull on December 15, 1890, brought upheaval. Surviving members of his family, including John, relocated in early 1891 to the Pine Ridge Indian Reservation, settling in the White Clay district.

== Performer and actor ==
Like many Lakota contemporaries, John Sitting Bull entered the world of popular entertainment. He toured with Buffalo Bill’s Wild West Show for several years across the United States and Canada. Later in life, he transitioned into Hollywood, playing small roles in films such as "Tomahawk" (1951), "The Savage" (1952), and "Chief Crazy Horse" (1955).

== Final years and legacy ==
In the 1940s, John Sitting Bull was interviewed extensively by artist and historian David Humphreys Miller, who also painted several portraits of him. In his book Ghost Dance (1959), Miller controversially claimed that John Sitting Bull had accidentally discharged a rifle during the attempted disarmament of Lakota under Chief Spotted Elk (Big Foot), an incident he suggested helped spark the Wounded Knee Massacre. This claim, however, is rejected by most historians. When not touring or acting, John primarily lived with his niece, Angelina LaPointe, at Pine Ridge Reservation. He died in Rapid City, South Dakota, on June 10, 1955.
