= Reelworld Film Festival =

Canadian film festival

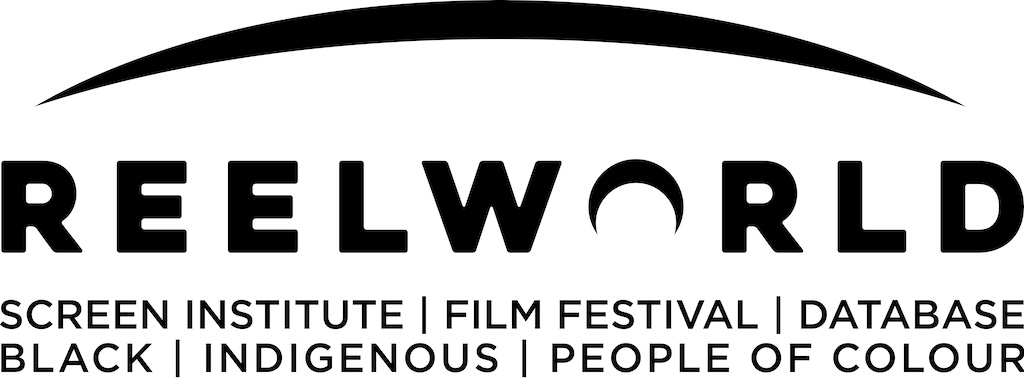
- Official festival logo
- Location: Toronto, Ontario, Canada
- Founded: 2001
- Website: www.reelworld.ca

The Reelworld Film Festival, founded in 2001 by Tonya Williams, is held annually in Toronto, Ontario, Canada. The festival screens film and provides professional development for Canadian racially diverse and indigenous filmmakers and media artists.

== History ==
Reelworld was founded by Tonya Williams, who noted the lack of opportunities for minorities to break into the film industry. The festival's mandate states that they showcase diverse work from Canada and abroad while bringing together assorted communities.

Reelworld has started a number of initiatives directed towards diverse artists. In 2020 Williams launched Access Reelworld, a casting database to help publicize and promote minority actors.

Due to the COVID-19 pandemic in Canada, the 2020 festival was presented entirely online.

In 2024, Williams was named the recipient of the Academy of Canadian Cinema and Television's Changemaker Award at the 12th Canadian Screen Awards, for her work with Reelworld.

=== 2021 ReelWorld Film Festival ===
The 21st annual ReelWorld Film Festival was held from October 20 to 27, 2021 in Toronto.

==== Award winners ====
Award	Winner	Ref
Outstanding Feature Film Award	In the Rumbling Belly of Motherland (Brishkay Ahmed)	
Outstanding Feature Film Director	Kaveh Nabatian, Without Havana (Sin la Habana)	
Outstanding Feature Film Writer	Kaveh Nabatian and Pablo D. Herrera Veitia, Without Havana (Sin la Habana)	
Outstanding Feature Film Producer	Brishkay Ahmed, In the Rumbling Belly of Motherland	
Outstanding Feature Film Actor	Yonah Acosta Gonzales, Without Havana (Sin la Habana)	
Outstanding Feature Film Actress	Aki Yaghoubi, Without Havana (Sin la Habana)	
Outstanding Feature Film Cinematographer	Juan Pablo Ramirez, Without Havana (Sin la Habana)	

=== 2022 ReelWorld Film Festival ===
The 22nd annual ReelWorld Film Festival was held from October 11 to 17, 2022 in Toronto.

==== Award winners ====
Award	Winner	Ref
Outstanding Feature Film Award	Golden Delicious (Jason Karman)	
Outstanding Feature Film Director	Jason Karman, Golden Delicious	
Outstanding Feature Film Writer	Gorrman Lee, Golden Delicious	
Outstanding Feature Film Producer	Ivan Madeira, Pattern	
Outstanding Feature Film Actor	Cardi Wong, Golden Delicious	
Outstanding Feature Film Actress	Jayne Kamara, Bite of a Mango	
Outstanding Feature Film Cinematographer	Kaveh Nabatian, Kite Zo A: Leave the Bones	
Audience Choice Award	Ron Dias and Joanne Jansen, Bite of a Mango	
Outstanding Short Film	Cazhhmere Downey, I Remember the Footprints in the Snow	
Outstanding Short Film Director	Alireza Kazemipour, Split Ends	
Outstanding Short Film Producer	Amir Zargara, More Than Hair	
Outstanding Short Film Actor	Gitz Crazyboy, Peace Pipeline	
Outstanding Short Film Actress	Nicole Nwokolo, I Remember the Footprints in the Snow	
Outstanding Short Film Cinematographer	Gabriela Osio Vanden, Saturday Fuego Diablo	
Outstanding Short Film Writer	Tesh Guttikonda, Mom vs Machine	

=== 2023 ReelWorld Film Festival ===
The 23rd annual ReelWorld Film Festival was held from November 1 to 7, 2023 in Toronto.

==== Award winners ====
Award	Winner	Ref
Outstanding Feature Film Award	Kim Albright, With Love and a Major Organ	
Outstanding Feature Film Director	Jamila Pomeroy, Union Street	
Outstanding Feature Film Writer	Lonzo Nzekwe, Orah	
Outstanding Feature Film Producer	Gavin Baird, A Storm Blows Over	
Outstanding Feature Film Actor	Hamza Haq, With Love and a Major Organ	
Outstanding Feature Film Actress	Oyin Oladejo, Orah	
Outstanding Feature Film Cinematographer	Leo Harim, With Love and a Major Organ	
Outstanding Short Film	Amir Honarmand, Silkworm	
Outstanding Short Film Director	Derek Kwan, 100 Days	
Outstanding Short Film Producer	Asa Kazerani, Desync	
Outstanding Short Film Actor	Mohammad Rashno, Silkworm	
Outstanding Short Film Actress	Briauna James, Oversight	
Outstanding Short Film Cinematographer	Ashley Iris Gill, The Future Above Us	

=== 2024 ReelWorld Film Festival ===
The 24th annual ReelWorld Film Festival was held from October 21 to November 3, 2024 in Toronto.

==== Award winners ====
Award	Winner	Ref
Outstanding Feature Film Award	Nadine Valcin, Simply Johanne (Tout simplement Johanne)	
Audience Choice Award	Bobby Singh Brown, Stealing Vows	
Outstanding Feature Film Director	Reza Dahya, Boxcutter	
Outstanding Feature Film Writer	Corey Payette, Les Filles du Roi	
Outstanding Feature Film Producer	Bobby Singh Brown, Stealing Vows	
Outstanding Feature Film Actor	Olivier Ross-Parent, The Madman	
Outstanding Feature Film Actress	Gia Sandhu, Stealing Vows	
Outstanding Feature Film Cinematographer	Hazem Berrabah and Omar Bouhoula, The Madman	
Outstanding Short Film	Amir Zargara, A Good Day Will Come	
Outstanding Short Film Director	Tara Aghdashloo, Empty Your Pockets	
Outstanding Short Film Writer	Ian Bawa, My Son Went Quiet	
Outstanding Short Film Producer	Amir Zargara, A Good Day Will Come	
Outstanding Short Film Actor	Kiarash Dadgar, Empty Your Pockets	
Outstanding Short Film Actress	Aixa Kay, Hatch	
Outstanding Short Film Cinematographer	Carine Zahner, Strangers	

=== 2025 ReelWorld Film Festival ===
The 25th annual ReelWorld Film Festival was held from October 16 to 19, 2025 in Toronto.

==== Award winners ====
Award	Winner	Ref
Outstanding Feature Film Award	Fitch Jean, It Comes in Waves	
Audience Choice Award	Mohamed Ahmed, A Tribe Called Love	
Outstanding Feature Film Director	Lamia Chraibi, Circo	
Outstanding Feature Film Writer	Sammy Mohammed, It Comes in Waves	
Outstanding Feature Film Producer	Amir Zargara, It Comes in Waves	
Outstanding Feature Film Actor	Adrian Walters, It Comes in Waves	
Outstanding Feature Film Actress	Joan Chen, Montreal, My Beautiful (Montréal, ma belle)	
Outstanding Feature Film Cinematographer	Jelan Maxwell, It Comes in Waves	
Outstanding Documentary	Lamia Chraibi, Circo	
Outstanding Short Film	Kevin Jin Kwan Kim, My Dad, the Rockstar	
Outstanding Short Film Director	Vanessa Magic, I Am Pleased	
Outstanding Short Film Writer	Jenny Lee-Gilmore, With Time	
Outstanding Short Film Producer	Grace Shutti and Momo Spaine, Lost Wax	
Outstanding Short Film Actor	Sangbum Kang, My Dad, the Rockstar	
Outstanding Short Film Actress	Rochelle Avis, Lichun	
Outstanding Short Film Cinematographer	Antonia Ramirez, Lost Wax	

=== 2026 ReelWorld Film Festival ===
The 26th annual ReelWorld Film Festival was held from October 22 to 25, 2026, in Toronto.

==== Award winners ====
Award	Winner	Ref
Outstanding Feature Film Award	Jorge Thielen Armand, Death Has No Master (La Muerte no tiene dueño)	
Audience Choice Award	Jaskaran Singh, Jersey Boy	
Outstanding Feature Film Director	Nadia Louis-Desmarchais, A Thousand Colours (Recomposée)	
Outstanding Feature Film Writer	Kevin Alves, Lucky Weekend	
Outstanding Feature Film Producer	Tim Riedel, Fawnda Neckoway and Edmon Rotea, Ancestral Beasts	
Outstanding Feature Film Actor	Praneet Akilla, Jersey Boy	
Outstanding Feature Film Actress	Muna Abdulahi, Lifeline	
Outstanding Feature Film Cinematographer	Luis Armando Arteaga, Death Has No Master (La Muerte no tiene dueño)	
Outstanding Short Film	Kimberly Ann Surin, The Last Wish	
Outstanding Short Film Director	Nada Cheddadi, Karima Zouhair and Romy Boutin St-Pierre, Sara & Fatima	
Outstanding Short Film Writer	Andrea Bang and Diana Bang, One Last Walk	
Outstanding Short Film Producer	Priyanka Shailendra and Emmanuel Teji, Shelf Life	
Outstanding Short Film Actor	Thomas Antony Olajide, Fine Black Frame	
Outstanding Short Film Actress	Marie-Aimée Cadet. The Last Wish	
Outstanding Short Film Cinematographer	Keenan Lynch, Purge	
