= Charles Onyeabor =

Italian-Nigerian musician

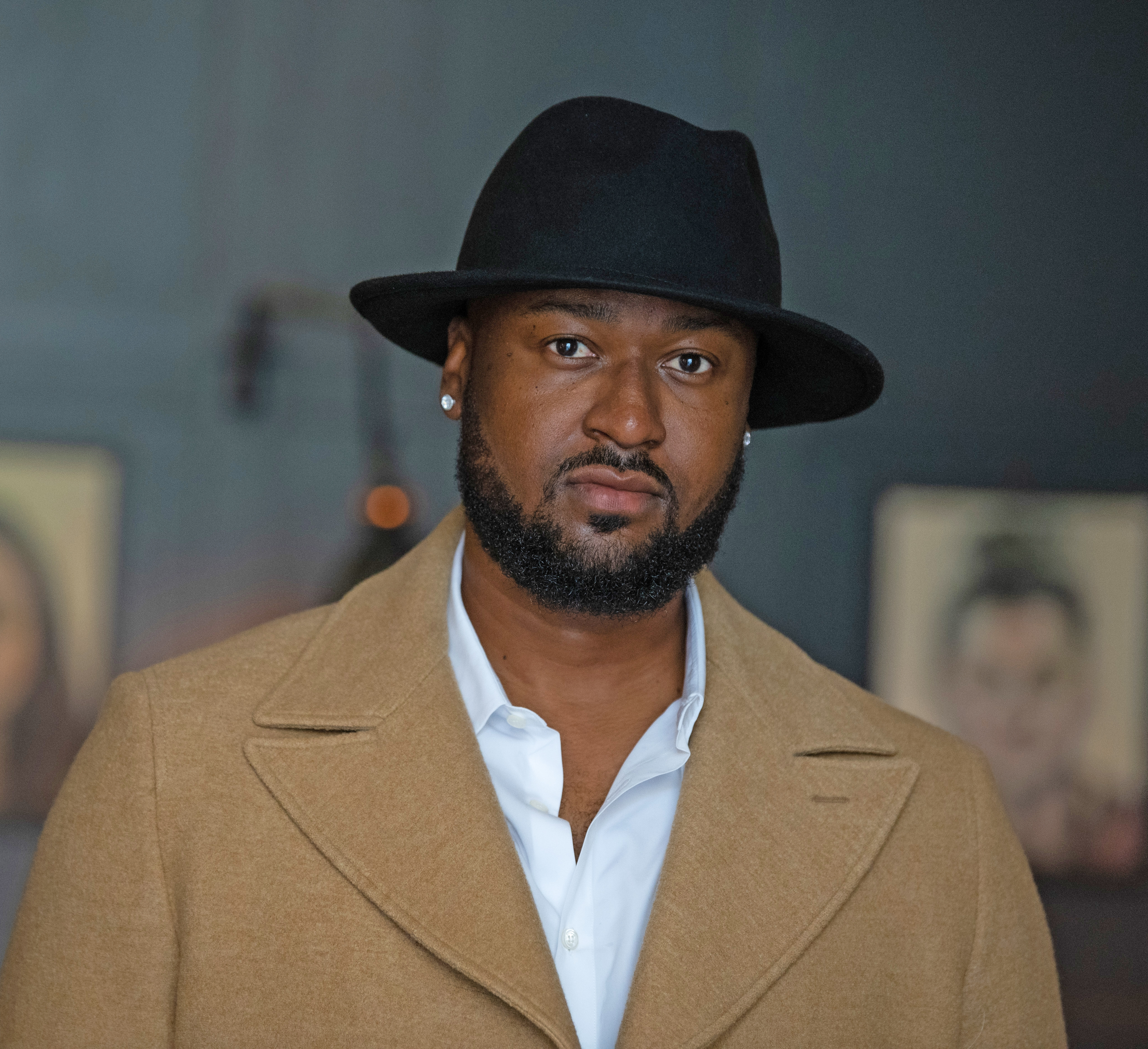
- Born: Charles Onyekachi Onyeabor; Enugu, Nigeria
- Citizenship: Nigerian; Italian
- Education: Enugu State University of Science and Technology
- Occupations: Singer; songwriter; businessman
- Years active: 2020-present
- Father: William Onyeabor
- Musical career
- Genres: Afrobeats; funk
- Instruments: Vocals
- Website: charlesonyeabor.com

Charles Onyekachi Onyeabor ( )is an Italian-Nigerian singer, songwriter and businessman. He is the eldest son of electro Afro-funk pioneer William Onyeabor. After debuting in 2020, his debut studio album, Like Father, Like Son was released in November 2023. As described by the Rolling Stone and BBC, Charles Onyeabor is the carrier of the flame of a generational torch and continues to keep his father's legacy alive in his music. His live event concert The Charles Onyeabor Show is held annually.

== Early life and education ==
I can't say I chose a particular style. I write songs the way I hear it in my head. Being around my father also inspired my taste of music. If you listen to my music, there is always a story around it. My father always had something to say within his music and it made me want to do the kind of music that I am doing. So, I would say my father inspired me to have my own style.

— The Guardian

Charles Onyeabor is the first son of William Onyeabor—a pioneer of electro-funk music genre. He is an alumnus of Enugu State University of Science and Technology. His grandparents were merchant traders who moved goods across Nigeria.

== Career ==
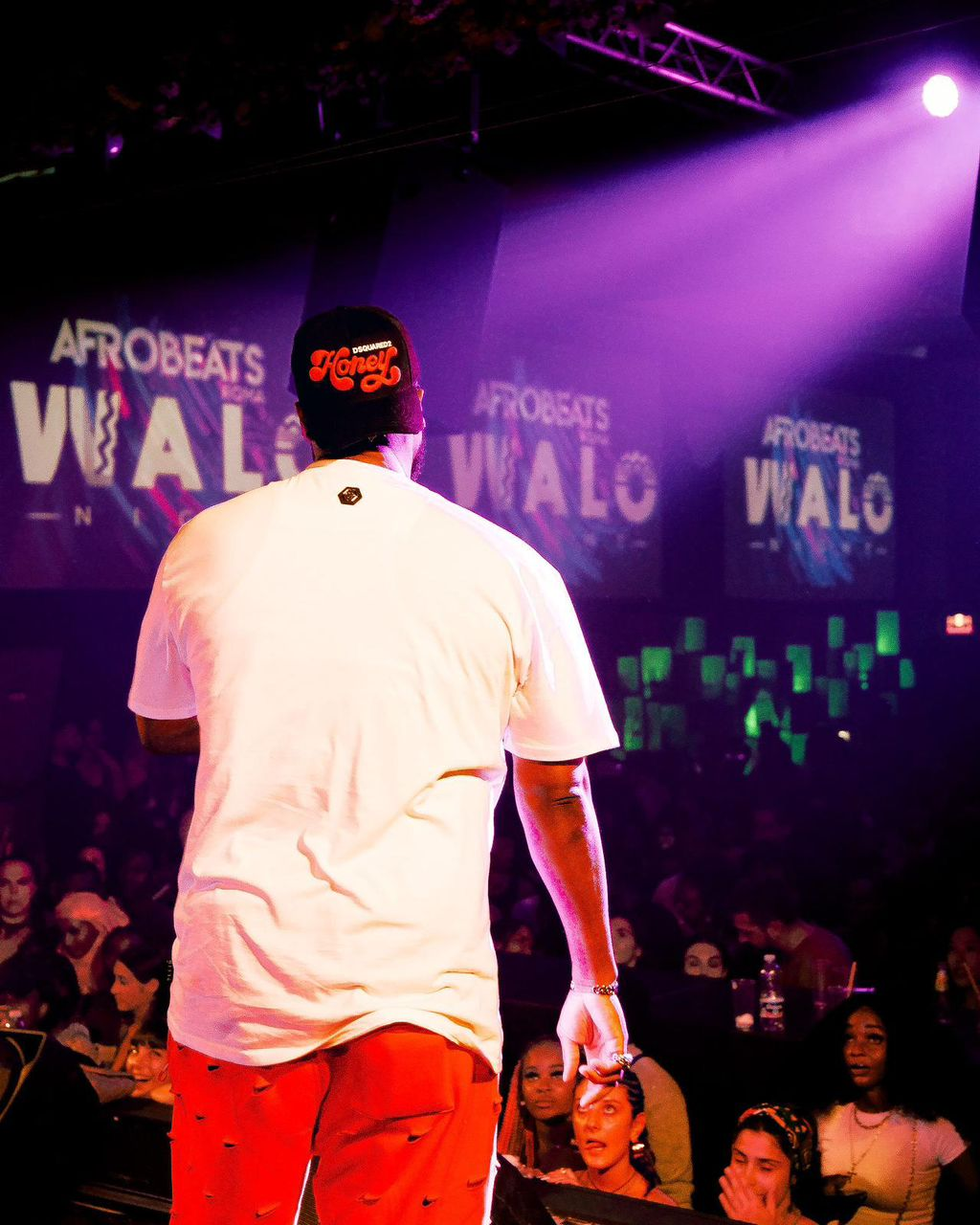
Onyeabor performing at Ruger's Europe Tour in Bologna (2024)

Onyeabor performing on stage

Onyeabor was influenced by the music of his father and followed his footsteps as a funk musician. Onyeabor, who left Nigeria for Italy in 2003, started his music career after the death of his father, having started a business there due to racial discrimination.

In 2020 Onyeabor released his first funk single, "They Can't Pull Us Down" featuring Miriam Taylor, and was followed by "Do It Your Way" featuring Enrico Matheis. The official video of his single "We All Need More Love" featuring Italian-Nigerian singer Evry, screened on MTV. According to Onyeabor, his creative process happens mostly in the car and when he's alone in the house.

In 2022, Onyeabor won Africa's Diaspora Artist at the 2022 Scream African Women Awards. In March 2023 he performed in Germany at Afrobeat Invasion alongside Psquare, Otile Brown, Abrantee and May7ven. In August the same year, he performed at the 36th Sanremo Rock Festival which is part of the RAI organized Sanremo Music Festival in Sanremo, Liguria. In November 2023, Onyeabor released his 20-track debut album, Like Father, Like Son, which met with positive reviews. Drawing from its title and cover art which symbolizes Charles and his father, The Nation described the album as Charles' way of expressing deep gratitude and admiration for his dad's influence.

Onyeabor was one of the contestants of Una voce per San Marino in 2022. His singles, "They Can't Pull Us Down" and "Ije Nwoke" were featured in Lonzo Nzekwe's 2023 crime thriller Orah, which screened at the Toronto International Film Festival in 2023.

In March 2024, Onyeabor released "Black or White" featuring Luna, the lead single for his sophomore album, described by Afrocritik as an anthem for unity and love. He followed "Black or White" with "Fine Girl" which expresses appreciation to women. He followed it with "Money Talks" where he tackled societal ills. In August 2024, Onyeabor performed at Kwaku Festival in Amsterdam, the same month he released "The Future of Africa, a track which comprises elements of soul and reggae that pays tribute to the unique characteristics of Africa. He followed it with "I'm Human" released later that same month.

The following month, he released his sophomore studio album, Onyekachi, a 10-track project that explores futuristic themes, personal stories, and cultural reflections. In September 21st of that same year, he performed at Ruger's Europe Tour in Bologna, Italy, where he was the only supporting and opening act.

In November 2024, Onyeabor released Ifenkili. In January 2025, Onyeabor released "Fall Like Rain" featuring Rex Ajc with singles "Victory", "Victory (Techno Version)" and "As e Dey Play e Dey Show" released the following month. "The Can't Quench My Fire", "Premium Enjoyment" featuring Justin Onyeabor and "Ifeoma" featuring Abolaji Collins were released in June. His 3rd studio album Ifenkili (The EP) was released in March 2025 under his own label, Rapid Groove Records the same year he was interviewed by BBC Igbo where he discussed his journey as an artiste and his father's legacy.

In July 2025, Charles Onyeabor made his sophomore appearance at the Sanremo Rock & Trend tour final in Hard Rock Cafe in Florence, Italy. In October 2025, Onyeabor first sold out show at the Hard Rock Cafe in Florence was hosted by Afrobeat podcaster, Adesope Shopsydoo. The following month he released “Akanchawa”, an Amapiano-charged optimistic bop as described by the Rolling Stone. In December of that same year, “Ya Body Go” featuring American R&B singer Joony was released. On 1st March 2026 he released “You Can’t Tell Me Nothing” described by Chinonso Ihekire of The Native Mag as the timelessness of a budding superstar eager to extend a generational legacy. In May 2026, he opened for Offset as the only opening and supporting artiste at the Central Club Firenze in Florence, Italy. The following month he opened for Odumodublvck in Düsseldorf, Germany. In July 2026, Onyeabor released his 4th studio album, Legacy Continua which features an art cover of his son. On 3rd October, the second edition of his sold-out live concert event, The Charles Onyeabor Show was held at the Hard Rock Cafe in Florence, Italy.

== Artistry ==
Onyeabor with fans at the 2nd edition of The Charles Onyeabor Show in Florence, Italy

Charles Onyeabor is genre-fluid and has described his father as his role model.

== Discography ==
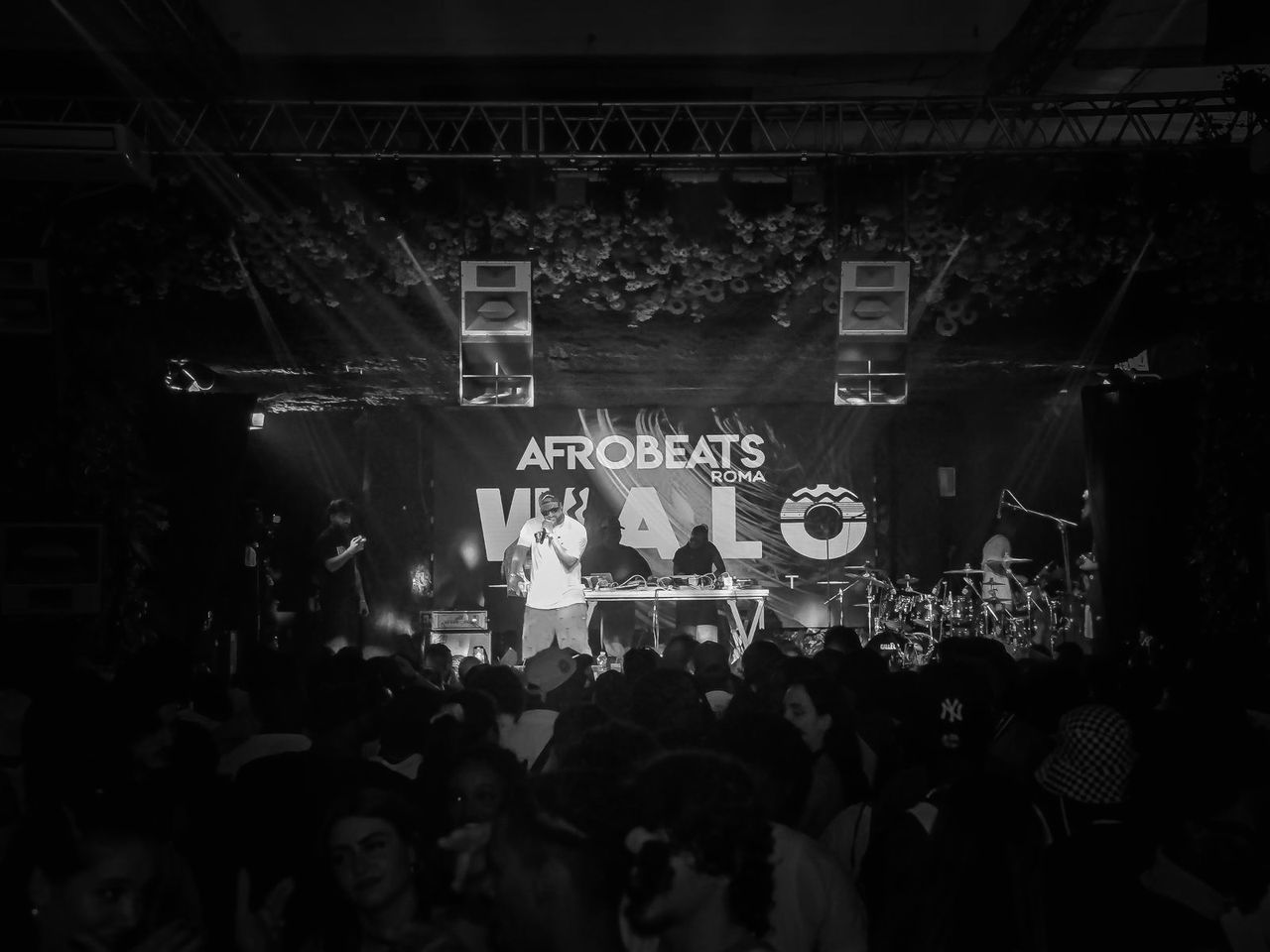
Onyeabor performing in Bologna

Singles

- "They Can't Pull Us Down" ft. Miriam Taylor
- "Do It Your Way" ft. Enrico Matheis
- "Bye Bye To My Ex Love"
- "We Fell In Love On Christmas"
- "Jolly"
- We All Need More Love"
- "Still Your Baby"
- "Ije Nwoke" ft Ejima042
- "Sawa"
- "Low" ft Emeka Onyeabor
- Come And Roll" ft Vic2kul
- "Sawa (Refix)"
- "Like Father Like Son" ft Magnito
- "Grateful"
- "Dance Your Troubles Away"
- "Anyi no o na-eme"
- "Black or White"
- "Fine Girl"
- "Money Talks"
- "The Future of Africa"
- "I'm Human"
- "They Can't Pull Us Down - Trap Version"
- "Ifenkili"
- "Fall Like Rain" ft Rex AJC
- "Victory"
- "Victory (Techno Version)"
- "As e Dey Play e Dey Show"
- "One More Time"
- "They Can't Quench My Fire"
- "Premium Enjoyment" ft Justin Onyeabor
- "Ifeoma" ft Abolaji Collins
- “Cho Cho Cho”
- “Sawa”
- “Akanchawa”
- “Ya Body Go” ft Joony
- “You Can’t Tell Me Nothing”

Albums

- Like Father, Like Son (2023)
- Onyekachi (2024)
- Ifenkili the EP (2025)
- Legacy Continua (2026)
