= 4th Jutra Awards =

2002 Canadian film awards ceremony

The 4th Jutra Awards were held on February 17, 2002, to honour films made with the participation of the Quebec film industry in 2001.

Soft Shell Man (Un crabe dans la tête) was the night's big winner, receiving nine nominations and winning seven awards, including Best Film and Best Supporting Actor for Emmanuel Bilodeau, with André Turpin taking home and Best Director, Best Screenplay and Best Cinematography.

February 15, 1839 (15 février 1839) also received nine nominations and won four awards, becoming the third film to receive two acting awards, and the first to win both Best Actor, for Luc Picard, and Best Supporting Actress, for Sylvie Drapeau. Picard went on to beat Rémy Girard, Patrick Huard and Marc Messier, who were all nominated for Les Boys III, and was also the first actor to be nominated for both Best Actor and Best Supporting Actor during the same ceremony.

Tar Angel (L'ange de goudron) received eight nominations, including the "Big Five": Best Film, Best Director, Best Actor for Zinedine Soualem, Best Actress for Catherine Trudeau and Best Screenplay.

The first tie in the history of the awards happened when Lost and Delirious and Maelström jointly won Most Successful Film Outside Quebec. With this award and the eight it won the previous year, Maelström tied the record set by The Red Violin (Le violon rouge) for the film with the most wins.

== Winners and nominees ==
Best Film	Best Director
Soft Shell Man (Un crabe dans la tête) — Luc Déry, Joseph Hillel; February 15, 1839 (15 février 1839) — Bernadette Payeur; Tar Angel (L'ange de goudron) — Roger Frappier, Luc Vandal; The Woman Who Drinks (La femme qui boit) — Bernadette Payeur	André Turpin, Soft Shell Man (Un crabe dans la tête); Denis Chouinard, Tar Angel (L'ange de goudron); Pierre Falardeau, February 15, 1839 (15 février 1839); Catherine Martin, Marriages (Mariages)
Best Actor	Best Actress
Luc Picard, February 15, 1839 (15 février 1839); Rémy Girard, Les Boys III; Patrick Huard, Les Boys III; David La Haye, Soft Shell Man (Un crabe dans la tête); Marc Messier, Les Boys III; Zinedine Soualem, Tar Angel (L'ange de goudron)	Élise Guilbault, The Woman Who Drinks (La femme qui boit); Fanny Mallette, A Girl at the Window (Une jeune fille à la fenêtre); Isabel Richer, The Pig's Law (La loi du cochon); Catherine Trudeau, Tar Angel (L'ange de goudron)
Best Supporting Actor	Best Supporting Actress
Emmanuel Bilodeau, Soft Shell Man (Un crabe dans la tête); Rabah Aït Ouyahia, Tar Angel (L'ange de goudron); Pierre Lebeau, Les Boys III; Luc Picard, The Woman Who Drinks (La femme qui boit)	Sylvie Drapeau, February 15, 1839 (15 février 1839); France Castel, Ice Cream, Chocolate and Other Consolations (Crème glacée, chocolat et autres consolations); Pascale Desrochers, Soft Shell Man (Un crabe dans la tête); Pierrette Robitaille, Wedding Night (Nuit de noces)
Best Screenplay	Best Cinematography
André Turpin, Soft Shell Man (Un crabe dans la tête); Denis Chouinard, Tar Angel (L'ange de goudron); Pierre Falardeau, February 15, 1839 (15 février 1839); Catherine Martin, Marriages (Mariages)	André Turpin, Soft Shell Man (Un crabe dans la tête); Alain Dostie, February 15, 1839 (15 février 1839); Guy Dufaux, Tar Angel (L'ange de goudron); Carlos Ferrand, Games of the Heart (Du pic au cœur)
Best Art Direction	Best Sound
Jean-Baptiste Tard, February 15, 1839 (15 février 1839); André-Line Beauparlant, The Woman Who Drinks (La femme qui boit); André-Line Beauparlant, Marriages (Mariages); Mario Hervieux, The Widow of Saint-Pierre (La veuve de Saint-Pierre)	Mathieu Beaudin, Serge Beauchemin, Hans Peter Strobl and Louis Gignac, February 15, 1839 (15 février 1839); Claude La Haye, Marie-Claude Gagné and Gavin Fernandes, Wedding Night (Nuit de noces); Gilles Corbeil, Sylvain Bellemare and Louis Gignac, Soft Shell Man (Un crabe dans la tête); Dominique Chartrand, Marcel Pothier and Luc Boudrias, A Girl at the Window (Une jeune fille à la fenêtre)
Best Editing	Best Original Music
Sophie Leblond, Soft Shell Man (Un crabe dans la tête); Louise Côté, The Woman Who Drinks (La femme qui boit); Gaétan Huot, Karmina 2; Aube Foglia, Between the Moon and Montevideo	Guy Pelletier and Ramachandra Borcar, Soft Shell Man (Un crabe dans la tête); Bertrand Chénier, Tar Angel (L'ange de goudron); Jean St-Jacques, February 15, 1839 (15 février 1839); Simon Wayland, Peter Xirogiannis and Phil York, Danny in the Sky
Best Live Short	Best Animated Short
Remembrance — Stephanie Morgenstern; Ismael — Rudy Barichello; Sunk — Yves Christian Fournier; Under a Leaden Sky — Guy Lampron	Black Soul (Âme noire) — Martine Chartrand; A Hunting Lesson (Une leçon de chasse) — Jacques Drouin; Glasses — Brian Duchscherer
Best Documentary	Special Awards
Blue Potatoes (Le Minot d'or) — Isabelle Raynauld; 4125 Parthenais (Le 4125, rue Parthenais) — Isabelle Lavigne; My Dinner with Weegee — Donigan Cumming; Three Princesses for Roland (Trois princesses pour Roland) — André-Line Beauparlant	Jutra Hommage: Anne-Claire Poirier; Most Successful Film Outside Quebec: Lost and Delirious and Maelström; Billet d'or: Les Boys III

== Multiple wins and nominations ==
=== Films with multiple nominations ===
Nominations	Film
9	February 15, 1839 (15 février 1839)
9	Soft Shell Man (Un crabe dans la tête)
8	Tar Angel (L'ange de goudron)
5	The Woman Who Drinks (La femme qui boit)
4	Les Boys III
3	A Girl at the Window (Une jeune fille à la fenêtre)
3	Marriages (Mariages)
2	Wedding Night (Nuit de noces)

=== Films with multiple wins ===
Wins	Film
7	Soft Shell Man (Un crabe dans la tête)
4	February 15, 1839 (15 février 1839)
