= Oladejo =

Oladejo may refer to:

- Nathaniel Oladejo Ogundipe, Nigerian Anglican bishop
- Oladejo Victor Akinlonu (born 1963), Nigerian artist and philosopher
- Oyin Oladejo (born c. 1985), Nigerian Canadian actress
- Oluwafemi Oladejo (born 2003), American football player
