= 20th Africa Movie Academy Awards =

2024 film awards ceremony

The 2024 African Movie Academy Awards ceremony was held on 2 November 2024 at the Balmoral Center in Ikeja, Lagos. The ceremony was hosted by hosted by Segun Arinze and Joselyn Dumas.

The nominees in 26 categories were announced in a ceremony held at the Sheraton Hotel in the Government Reserved Area (GRA) of Ikeja, on 3 October 2024 by the head of the jury, Dorothee Wenner.

== Efer Ozako award for best short film ==
The Last Shoe Maker (Uganda)- WINNER

Seben (Mali)

Dear Future Wife (South Africa)

Isolated (Nigeria)

Joia (Angola)

Strike A Blow And Die (Malawi)

Don't Call Me Beautiful (Ghana)

Sins Of A Father (Zimbabwe/USA)

== Jubril Malafia award for best animation ==
Heavy Crown (Libya)

Counter Punch (Kenya) – WINNER

Journey of the Legend (Cameroon)

Hadu (Nigeria)

Between Paya and Koulou (Senegal)

Oya (The goddess of gods) (Nigeria)

Set Pieces (Sudan)

== Best Documentary ==
A Quand L’Afrique (Congo Brazzaville)

The Night Still Smells of Gun Powder (Mozambique) – WINNER

The Return Train (Mali)

Gateway To Dreams (Cameroon)

Rainbow Nation (South Africa)

Dela- The Making of EL-Anatsui (Nigeria)

Donga (Libya)

Rising Up At Night (DRC)

== Best Diaspora Short Film ==
The Neighbourhood Alert (USA)- WINNER

Bottled Up (Jamaica)

The Golden Boy (USA)

== Best Diaspora Documentary ==
The Wu Tang Clan: Live at Red Rocks Amphitheatre (USA) – WINNER

A Rising Tide (USA)

Colour (USA)

== Best Diaspora Narrative Feature ==
Outlaw Posse (USA)- WINNER

Mickey Hardaway (USA)

Love After Holidays (USA)

== Michael Anyiam Osigwe Award For Best Film By An African Living Abroad ==
Out Of Breath (Nigeria/UK)

Orah (Nigeria/Canada)

Isolated (Nigeria/UK)

Under The Hanging Tree (Namibia/UK)- WINNER

Kipkemboi (Nigeria/ Canada)

== Ousmane Sembene Award For Best Film In An African Language ==
Makula (Uganda)

Jagun Jagun (Nigeria)

The Queenstown Kings (South Africa)- WINNER

Kaka (Nigeria)

Eskhalemi Sikantombella (South Africa)

Unheard (Uganda)

Out of Breath (Nigeria)

== Achievement In Costume Design ==
The Beads

The Weekend

White and Black

Jagun Jagun

The Queenstown Kings

Mai Martaba- WINNER

Out of Breath

== Achievement In Make-up ==
The Weekend

Nawi

Letters to Goddo

Out of Breath

Jagun Jagun – WINNER

Anjola

White and Black

== Achievement In Visual Effect ==
Kipkemboi

Jagun Jagun- WINNER

Under The Hanging Tree

The Weekend

Bokwagter

Out of Breath

== Achievement In Soundtrack ==
The Weekend

Under the Hanging Tree

The Queenstown Kings

Orah

Mojisola

Red Carpet

Boda Love – WINNER

== Achievement In Sound ==
A Smile, A Wink and a Tear

The Weekend

Under the Hanging Tree

The Queenstown Kings- WINNER

Boda Love

Kipkemboi

Boda Love

== Achievement In Production Design ==
Orah

The Queenstown Kings

The Weekend

Jagun Jagun

Kipkemboi

Makula

Out of Breath- WINNER

== Achievement In Cinematography ==
The Weekend- WINNER

Nawi

Kipkemboi

Letters to Goddo

This is Lagos

The Queenstown Kings

A Smile, A Wink and A Tear

== Achievement In Editing ==
Under The Hanging Tree- WINNER

The Weekend

This is Lagos

Nawi

Kipkemboi

The Beads

Anjola

== Achievement In Screenplay ==
Under The Hanging Tree

The Weekend- WINNER

Letter To Goddo

This is Lagos

Boda love

The Queenstown Kings

Out of Breath

== National Film And Video Censors Board (Nfvcb) Award For Best Nigerian Film ==
The Weekend- WINNER

This is Lagos

Afamefuna

Jagun Jagun

Mai Martaba

A Smile, A wink and a tear

Out of Breath

== Best Young / Promising Actor ==
Michell Lemuya (Nawi)- WINNER

Likhona Mgali (The Queenstown Kings)

Agape mngomezulu (Orah)

William Dias (Bokwagter)

Kofi Adu-Gyamfi (Tejiri)

Ruby Akubueze (She)

Fatima Muhammed (Mai Martaba)

== Best Actor In A Supporting Role ==
Sandile Mahlangu (The Queenstown Kings)

Ochungo Benson (Nawi)

Keppy Ekpeyong Bassey (The Weekend)

Ikechukwu Onunaku (This is Lagos)

Lucky Ejim (Orah)

Solomon Fixon Owoo (Letters to Goddo)

Femi Adebayo (Jagun Jagun)- WINNER

== Best Actress In A Supporting Role ==
Meg Otanwa (The Weekend)

Enhle Mbali Mlotshwa (The Queenstown Kings)

Elsie Chidera Abang (Kipkemboi)- WINNER

Tessa Twala (The Queenstown Kings)

Bukunmi Oluwashina (White and Black)

Somkele Iyamah-Idhalamah (Orah)

Chioma Akpotha (Mojisola)

== Best Actor In A Leading Role ==
Zolixa Xaluva (The Queenstown Kings)- WINNER

Gabriel Afolayan (This is Lagos)

Duncan Murunyu Mungai (Boda Love)

Nenesenor Abloso (Letters to Goddo)

Bucci Franklin (The Weekend)

Femi Jacobs (Anjola)

Chidi Mokeme (Out of Breath)

== Best Actress In A Leading Role ==
Girley Jazama (Under The Hanging Tree)

Oyin Oladejo (Orah)

Unati Faku (The Queenstown Kings)

Uzoamaka Aniunoh (The Weekend)

Laura Pepple (This is Lagos)

Jackie Appiah (Red Carpet)- WINNER

Efe Irele (A Smile, A Wink and A Tear)

== Best Debut Feature Film By A Director ==
LETTERS TO GODDO (Harry Bentil)- WINNER

RISING UP AT NIGHT (Nelson Makengo)

SHE (Seun Richards)

== Best Director ==
Daniel Emeka Oriahi (The Weekend)

Kenneth Gyang (This Is Lagos)

Jahmil X.T Qubeka (The Queenstown Kings)- WINNER

Perivi Katjavivi (Under The Hanging Tree)

Lonzo Nzekwe (Orah)

Harry Bentil ( Letters To Goddo)

Izu Ojukwu (A Smile, A Wink and A Tear)

== Best Film ==
Under The Hanging Tree

The Weekend- WINNER

This is Lagos

A Smile, A Wink and A Tear

Orah

Letters to Goddo

The Queenstown Kings

== Lifetime achievement award ==
Souleymane Cisse (Mali)

Nacer Khemir (Tunisia)

Haile Gerima (Ethiopia)

== Special Recognition ==
Alain Gomis (Senegal/Gabon)

Tsitsi Dangarembga (Zimbabwe)
