= The Charles Onyeabor Show =

Nigerian music concert

- Genre: Afrobeats, Funk
- Date: October
- Frequency: Annually
- Years active: 2025-present
- Founder: Charles Onyeabor
- Organiser: Adesope Olajide

The Charles Onyeabor Show is a Nigerian annual live concert event founded by son of Williams Onyeabor, Charles Onyeabor. The inaugural event hosted by Adesope Shopsydoo took place on 24 October 2025 at the Hard Rock Cafe in Florence, Italy and was a sold-out event. It has been profiled by The Guardian as one of the concerts defining Nigeria’s ever-evolving live music culture.

The 2nd edition of The Charles Onyeabor Show was held in the same location on 3rd October 2026.
