= Isabelle Lavigne =

Canadian documentary filmmaker

Isabelle Lavigne is a Canadian documentary filmmaker from Quebec, most noted as co-director with Stéphane Thibault of the 2011 film At Night, They Dance (La nuit, elles dansent).

Her first film, 4125 Parthenais (Le 4125, rue Parthenais), was released in 2001, and was a Jutra nominee for Best Documentary Film at the 4th Jutra Awards in 2002.

She and Thibault subsequently directed Junior in 2008, before spending several months in Egypt to film At Night, They Dance. The film won the Genie Award for Best Feature Length Documentary at the 32nd Genie Awards, and was a Jutra Award nominee for Best Documentary Film at the 14th Jutra Awards, in 2012.

In 2025 she received funding from the Société de développement des entreprises culturelles for the forthcoming documentary film La Vie imparfaite de Willy.
