= Junior (2008 film) =

- Directed by: Isabelle Lavigne; Stéphane Thibault
- Written by: Isabelle Lavigne; Stéphane Thibault
- Produced by: Johanne Bergeron; Yves Bisaillon
- Starring: Benjamin Breault; Christian Daigle; Michel Morissette; Éric Dubois; Éric Messier; Jean-Pierre Lareau; Ryan-James Hand; François Bouchard; Alexandre Picard-Hooper; Jonathan Duchesneau; Michel Laroque; Jacques Tremblay; Pierre Parent; Denis Leblanc; Marcel Marsolais; Patrick Lowe; Alex Lamontagne; Ryan Lehr; Gilles Côté; Brian St-Louis
- Edited by: René Roberge
- Production company: National Film Board of Canada
- Release dates: September 10, 2008 (RIDM); January 28, 2008 (Quebec)
- Running time: 96 minutes
- Country: Canada
- Languages: French, English

Junior is a 2008 documentary film chronicling a year in the life of Baie-Comeau Drakkar of the Quebec Major Junior Hockey League. Co-directed by Isabelle Lavigne and Stéphane Thibault and produced by the National Film Board of Canada, the film was named Best Documentary: Society at the Prix Gémeaux and Best Canadian Feature Documentary at the Hot Docs Canadian International Documentary Festival. It also won the Sheffield Doc/Fest Audience Award in 2009

The film was shot in Direct Cinema style and follows players, managers, trainers, shareholders, agents and recruiters over the course of an entire season.

== See also ==
- List of films about ice hockey
