= Omolade =

Ọmọladé
- Gender: Unisex
- Language: Yoruba

Origin
- Origin: Yorubaland
- Meaning: The child is the crown
- Region of origin: Yorubaland [Nigeria, Benin, Togo]

Ọmọladé audiois a Yoruba given name and a surname. It is a unisex name of Yoruba origin, which means "The child is the crown.". The name Ọmọladé is common among the royal families but now it is a general name. The diminutive forms are Moladé or Ladé.

== Notable individuals with the name ==
- Ajibade Omolade (born 1984), Nigerian footballer
- Akeem Omolade (born 1983), Nigerian footballer
- Omolade Akinremi (born 1974), Nigerian hurdler
- Abisola Omolade (born 1974), Nigerian art director, production designer, beauty queen and former accountant.

== See also ==
- Molade
