= Bloom (2022 film) =

Bloon
- French: Jouvencelles
- Directed by: Fanie Pelletier
- Written by: Fanie Pelletier
- Produced by: Audrey D. Laroche
- Cinematography: Matthew Wolkow
- Edited by: René Roberge
- Music by: Simon L'Espérance
- Distributed by: La Distributrice des Films
- Release date: November 18, 2022 (RIDM)
- Running time: 84 minutes
- Country: Canada
- Language: French

Bloom (French: Jouvencelles) is a Canadian documentary film, directed by Fanie Pelletier and released in 2022. The film is a portrait of contemporary teenage girls, centering in particular on how they navigate the unique social pressures of growing up in a hyperconnected online world dominated by social media.

The film premiered in November 2022 at the Montreal International Documentary Festival, before having a commercial release in February 2023.

René Roberge received a Canadian Screen Award nomination for Best Editing in a Documentary at the 11th Canadian Screen Awards in 2023.
