= Blue Potatoes =

2001 Canadian documentary film

- French: Le Minot d'or
- Directed by: Isabelle Raynauld
- Written by: Isabelle Raynauld
- Produced by: Claude Cartier; Peter Krieger
- Cinematography: Peter Krieger
- Edited by: Alain Baril
- Music by: Robert Marcel Lepage
- Production company: Les Productions Virage
- Distributed by: Cinéma Libre
- Release date: 2001
- Running time: 57 minutes
- Country: Canada
- Language: French

Blue Potatoes (French: Le Minot d'or) is a Canadian documentary film, directed by Isabelle Raynauld and released in 2001. The film centres on six people with intellectual disabilities who, after having lived in institutions for much of their lives, are now residing in an independent living home in Lotbinière, Quebec and exploring their new freedom to make their own choices and pursue their own goals.

The film was winner of the Jutra Award for Best Documentary Film at the 4th Jutra Awards in 2002.
