= Rabah Aït Ouyahia =

Canadian actor

- Citizenship: Algeria, Canada
- Occupation: Actor

Rabah Aït Ouyahia is an Algerian-Canadian actor. He is most noted as a two-time Jutra/Iris nominee for Best Supporting Actor, receiving nods at the 4th Jutra Awards in 2002 for Tar Angel (L'Ange de goudron) and at the 24th Quebec Cinema Awards in 2022 for A Revision (Une révision).

He moved to Canada in 1996 as a refugee from the Algerian Civil War. His other acting roles have included the films Montreal, White City (Montréal ville blanche) and Kinship, the television series L'Imposteur, and a 2017 stage production of Bashir Lazhar.
