= NAACP Image Award for Outstanding International Motion Picture =

American film award

The NAACP Image Award for Outstanding International Motion Picture was created in 2013 and discontinued a year later. The award returned during the 2021 ceremony.

== Winners and nominees ==
=== 2013 ===
- The Intouchables (France)
  - Chico and Rita (Spain, United Kingdom)
  - For Greater Glory: The True Story of Cristiada (Mexico)
  - Forces spéciales (France)
  - The Raid: Redemption (Indonesia, France, United States)

=== 2014 ===
- War Witch (Canada)
  - Call Me Kuchu (United States, Uganda)
  - High Tech, Low Life (China, United States)
  - La Playa DC (Colombia, Brazil, France)
  - Lion Ark (United States, United Kingdom, Bolivia)

=== 2021 ===
- Night of the Kings (France)
  - Ainu Mosir (Japan)
  - His House (United States)
  - The Last Tree (United Kingdom)
  - The Life Ahead (Italy)

=== 2022 ===
- 7 Prisoners (Brazil)
  - African America (South Africa, United States)
  - Eyimofe (This is My Desire) (Nigeria)
  - Flee (United States, United Kingdom, France, Sweden, Norway, Denmark)
  - The Gravedigger's Wife (France, Somalia, Germany, Finland)

=== 2023 ===
- Bantú Mama (Dominican Republic)
  - Athena (France)
  - Broker (South Korea)
  - Learn to Swim (Canada)
  - The Silent Twins (United Kingdom, Poland, United States)

=== 2024 ===
- Brother (Canada)
  - Anatomy of a Fall (France)
  - Mami Wata (Nigeria)
  - Society of the Snow (Spain)
  - Rye Lane (United Kingdom)

=== 2025 ===
- Emilia Pérez (France)
  - In Her Place (El lugar de la otra) (Chile)
  - Memoir of a Snail (Australia)
  - The Seed of the Sacred Fig (Germany, Iran, France)
  - The Wall Street Boy (Kipkemboi) (Kenya, Canada)

=== 2026 ===
- Souleymane's Story (France)
  - 40 Acres (Canada)
  - My Father's Shadow (United Kingdom)
  - The Fisherman (Nigeria)
  - The Secret Agent (Brazil)

== See also ==
- 2013 in film
- 2014 in film
- Academy Award for Best Foreign Language Film
