= Jamila Pomeroy =

Kenyan-Canadian writer and filmmaker

- Born: Toronto, Ontario
- Citizenship: Canadian
- Occupations: Writer, director, producer, Actor
- Awards: Outstanding Director for a Feature Film, Union Street Daytime Emmy Nomination, "How I Got Here"
- Website: jmpomeroy.com

Jamila Pomeroy is a Kenyan-Canadian writer, director, producer and on-screen personality. She is best known for her 2023 documentary film Union Street, her 2025 CBC Absolutely Canadian special Muzizi, the 2024 Daytime Emmy-nominated series How I Got Here, and her 2022 series A Happier Planet with Jamila Pomeroy on CBC.

== Career ==
She was the writer, director, host and producer of the series A Happier Planet with Jamila Pomeroy on CBC;

In 2022 she optioned and began development on a screen adaption of the novel Until I Smile At You; which showcases the life of Canadian musician Ruth Lowe, who wrote the song that "dynamited Frank Sinatra’s singing career into the stratosphere," "I’ll Never Smile Again" and “Put Your Dreams Away,” another Sinatra hit, along with nearly 50 other numbers for Hollywood and Broadway.

In 2023 she was the writer, director and executive producer of TELUS originals documentary Union Street, which won the Outstanding Feature Film Director award at the 2023 Toronto Reelworld Film Festival. Union Street was also an official selection of Vancouver International Film Festival (VIFF) in 2023, and was named #1 in Vancouver Magazine's top-10 Must-see films at VIFF, and #2 in The Tyee's "Ten documentary highlights to bookmark," and top-10 must-see film by Vancouver Sun.

She is the creator of drama-comedy series Sunflower Lemonade (unreleased) which Daily Hive coined as the "first African-Canadian dramedy in history"; and has worked as a writer and producer on other film and television projects.

=== Early career ===
She began her career as a freelance writer-journalist (writing for outlets like BBC, Red Bull Media, Hypebae more); and model, appearing in print and digital campaigns for brands like Lululemon, Kit and Ace, Arc'teryx, Laneige, Sephora, Paper Label and many more.

== Personal life ==
Pomeroy was born in Toronto, Ontario, grew up in New Westminster, BC, and as a teen moved to Vancouver, BC, where she still currently resides. Her father was born in Mombasa, Kenya, and her mother was born in St. John's, Newfoundland.

== Filmography ==
- A Happier Planet with Jamila Pomeroy (2022) – series
- Union Street (2023) – feature documentary
- How I Got Here (2024) – series
- Absolutely Canadian: Muzizi (2025) — CBC documentary special

== Awards ==
- 2023: Winner, Outstanding Feature Film Director award for Union Street, Reelworld Film Festival, Toronto
- 2023: Winner, Best Documentary award for Union Street, Milan Independent Film Festival (MIAFF)
- 2025: Nominated, Outstanding Travel and Adventure Program, Daytime Emmys
