= My Dinner with Weegee =

2001 Canadian documentary film

- Directed by: Donigan Cumming
- Written by: Donigan Cumming
- Produced by: Donigan Cumming
- Starring: Martin Corbin
- Edited by: Donigan Cumming
- Release date: 2001
- Running time: 36 minutes
- Country: Canada
- Language: English

My Dinner with Weegee is a Canadian documentary film, directed by Donigan Cumming and released in 2001. The film is a portrait of Marty Corbin, an elderly man isolated by poor health who recounts stories from his younger days as a labour organizer and peace activist, including his social interactions with notable figures including activists David Dellinger, Daniel Berrigan, Philip Berrigan and Bayard Rustin, photographer Weegee, and writer James Agee.

The film won the award for best short or medium-length film from the Association québécoise des critiques de cinéma in 2002, and was a Jutra Award nominee for Best Documentary Film at the 4th Jutra Awards in 2002.
