= Jersey Boy (film) =

2026 Canadian film

- Directed by: Jaskaran Singh
- Written by: Jaskaran Singh
- Produced by: Pulkit Datta; Jaskaran Singh; Eman Pathan
- Starring: Praneet Akilla; Rayaan Singh Sahni; Surjun Lail
- Cinematography: Allen Liu
- Edited by: Kyle Carrie-Mattimoe
- Music by: Raashi Kulkarni
- Production companies: Paradox Lost; Tyger Tyger Productions
- Release date: May 9, 2026 (CAAMFest)
- Running time: 108 minutes
- Country: Canada
- Languages: English; Punjabi

Jersey Boy is a Canadian drama film, written and directed by Jaskaran Singh and released in 2026. The film follows the life of Karandeep Singh, a Sikh American from New Jersey who must wrestle with concepts of family, identity and community following a family tragedy, amid the context of anti-Sikh sentiment in the United States in the wake of the September 11 attacks.

The film stars Rayaan Singh Sahni as Karandeep in childhood, Surjun Lail as Karandeep in his teenage years and Praneet Akila as Karandeep in adulthood, as well as Jon McLaren, Bea Santos, Sara Garcia, David MacInnis, Ryan Bannon, Isaac Kragten, William Desrosiers, Javier Montenegro, Rebecca Kwan, Sharon McFarlane, Noor Kaur Dhanda and Melanie Lachman in supporting roles.

== Production ==
Singh won the $36,000 Power Pitch competition at the 2020 Whistler Film Festival for the film's initial outline. In 2021 the screenplay was named to the Coalition of Asian Pacifics in Entertainment's annual CAPE List for unproduced screenplays about Asian and Pacific Islander characters.

It was shot in fall 2023, primarily in Hamilton, Mississauga and Sarnia, Ontario.

== Distribution ==
The film had its world premiere at CAAMFest in May 2026, followed by its Canadian premiere at the International South Asian Film Festival of Canada in September.

== Awards ==
The film was longlisted for the 2026 Jean-Marc Vallée DGC Discovery Award.

At the 2026 Reelworld Film Festival, Praneet Akila won the award for Outstanding Feature Film Actor.
