= If Only I =

2000 Canadian documentary film

- Directed by: Donigan Cumming
- Written by: Donigan Cumming
- Produced by: Donigan Cumming
- Edited by: Donigan Cumming
- Release date: 2000
- Running time: 35 minutes
- Country: Canada
- Language: English

If Only I is a Canadian documentary film, directed by Donigan Cumming and released in 2000. The film is a portrait of Colleen, a recovering heroin addict facing challenges after being left unable to walk following a suicide attempt.

The film premiered at the Festival du nouveau cinéma in 2000, and was screened at the 2001 Hot Docs Canadian International Documentary Festival.

The film was a Jutra Award nominee for Best Documentary Film at the 3rd Jutra Awards in 2001.
