= Union Street (film) =

2023 film

- Directed by: Jamila Pomeroy
- Written by: Jamila Pomeroy
- Produced by: Mack Stannard
- Cinematography: Liam Mitchell
- Edited by: Coline Debray
- Music by: Amine Bouzaher
- Distributed by: TELUS Originals
- Release date: October 2, 2023 (VIFF)
- Running time: 79 minutes
- Country: Canada
- Language: English

Union Street is a Canadian documentary film, directed by Jamila Pomeroy and released in 2023. The film centres on the history of the Hogan's Alley neighbourhood in Vancouver, British Columbia, a predominantly Black Canadian community which was demolished in the early 1970s in the name of urban renewal.

The film premiered at the 2023 Vancouver International Film Festival. It was subsequently screened at the Reelworld Film Festival, where Pomeroy won the award for best direction in a feature film.

In February 2024 it received a week-long run at the VIFF Centre, before being released to Telus's Optik streaming platform, TELUS originals, as part of Black History Month.
