= Orah (film) =

2023 Canadian drama film

- Directed by: Lonzo Nzekwe
- Written by: Lonzo Nzekwe
- Produced by: Amos Adetuyi; Floyd Kane; Lonzo Nzekwe
- Starring: Oyin Oladejo; Lucky Ejim
- Cinematography: Ricardo Diaz
- Edited by: Marc Roussel
- Music by: Felipe Téllez
- Production company: Circle Blue Entertainment
- Distributed by: Levelfilm
- Release date: September 23, 2023 (Cinéfest)
- Running time: 95 minutes
- Country: Canada
- Language: English

Orah is a Canadian crime thriller film, written and directed by Lonzo Nzekwe, and released in 2023. The film stars Oyin Oladejo as Orah Madukaku, a Nigerian woman who moved to Canada as a refugee after intentionally killing a man in her youth. Getting involved in a money laundering scheme in the hopes of finally being able to bring her son to Canada, she runs afoul of ringleader Bami Hazar (Lucky Ejim), who orders the murder of her son, sparking Orah to go on a revenge spree to settle the score.

The cast also includes Morgan Bedard, Agape Mngomezulu, Somkele Iyamah, Oris Erhuero, OC Ukeje, Christopher Seivright, Chris Farquhar, Emeka Nwagbaraocha, Femi Lawson, Jim Calarco, Tina Mba, Phil Popp, Ruby Akubueze, Angel Oduko, Eric Obinna, Novo Imonieroh, Moc Madu and Kelechi Udegbe. The film soundtracked two songs from Charles Onyeabor debut album, Like Father, Like Son, “They Can’t Pull Us Down” and “Ije Nwoke”.

== Production ==
The film was shot principally in Sudbury, Ontario, in 2022, with some later location shooting in Lagos, Nigeria where it was art directed by Nigerian production designer and art director, Abisola Omolade.

== Distribution ==
The film was selected and screened for industry professionals at the 2023 Toronto International Film Festival, in the Industry Selects program. The film had its official public premiere at the 2023 Cinéfest Sudbury International Film Festival. The film was selected as the opening film at the 2023 Africa International Film Festival (AFRIFF). The film screened at the 2023 ReelWorld Film Festival in Toronto and won two awards: Outstanding Feature Film Writer for Nzekwe, and Outstanding Feature Film Actress for Oladejo.
