= 4125 Parthenais =

2001 Canadian documentary film

- French: Le 4125, rue Parthenais
- Directed by: Isabelle Lavigne
- Written by: Isabelle Lavigne
- Produced by: Lucie Lambert
- Cinematography: Alex Margineanu
- Edited by: Mélanie Chicoine; René Roberge
- Music by: Pierre Desrochers
- Production company: Les Films du Tricycle
- Distributed by: Antenna Distribution
- Release date: 2001
- Running time: 50 minutes
- Country: Canada
- Language: French

4125 Parthenais (French: Le 4125, rue Parthenais) is a Canadian documentary film, directed by Isabelle Lavigne and released in 2001. The film centres on a small apartment building in the Plateau-Mont-Royal borough of Montreal, Quebec, which is one of the few buildings in the area that permits short-term rather than fixed-lease rental. It profiles both the Romanian immigrant landlady and several of her marginalized and impoverished tenants.

The film was a Jutra Award nominee for Best Documentary Film at the 4th Jutra Awards in 2002.
