= Golden Delicious (film) =

2022 Canadian film directed by Jason Karman

- Directed by: Jason Karman
- Written by: Gorrman Lee
- Produced by: Kristyn Stilling
- Starring: Cardi Wong; Chris Carson
- Cinematography: Alfonso Chin
- Edited by: Mike Jackson
- Music by: Mary Ancheta
- Production company: Golden Delicious Films
- Release date: October 5, 2022 (VIFF)
- Running time: 119 minutes
- Country: Canada
- Language: English

Golden Delicious is a Canadian coming-of-age drama film, directed by Jason Karman and released in 2022. The film stars Cardi Wong as Jake, a Chinese Canadian teenager who must confront the expectations of his family when he joins the school basketball team in a bid to get closer to his classmate Aleks (Chris Carson), with whom he has fallen in love.

The cast also includes Parmiss Sehat, Ryan Mah, Leeah Wong, Claudia Kai, Jesse Hyde, Hunter Dillon, Zavien Garrett, Jeff Joseph, Kameron Louangxay, Cole Howard and David Kaye.

The film premiered in the Northern Lights program at the 2022 Vancouver International Film Festival.

== Production ==
Gorrman Lee had originally written the screenplay as a heterosexual coming-of-age story, but after the first draft failed to attract production funding he and Karman rewrote it to introduce some elements of Karman's experiences as a gay man.

== Awards ==
The film was longlisted for the Directors Guild of Canada's 2022 Jean-Marc Vallée DGC Discovery Award. It won four awards at the 2022 Reelworld Film Festival, for Outstanding Feature Film, Outstanding Director of a Feature Film (Karman), Outstanding Actor in a Feature Film (Wong) and Outstanding Writer of a Feature Film (Gorrman Lee).

== See also ==
- List of basketball films
