= René Roberge =

Canadian film editor

René Roberge is a Canadian film editor. He is most noted for his work on the film Pauline Julien, Intimate and Political (Pauline Julien, intime et politique), for which he won the Prix Iris for Best Editing in a Documentary at the 21st Quebec Cinema Awards in 2019.

He was also a nominee in the same category at the 19th Quebec Cinema Awards in 2017 for Living With Giants (Chez les géants), and a Canadian Screen Award nominee for Best Editing in a Documentary at the 11th Canadian Screen Awards in 2023 for Bloom (Jouvencelles).

== Filmography ==
- The Story of A (Le Récit d'A) - 1990
- Les Printemps incertains - 1992
- The Measure of Your Passage (Le Singe bleu) - 1992
- My Life (Ma vie) - 1993
- Rosaire et la Petite-Nation - 1997
- Le Prix de la vie - 1998
- 4125 Parthenais (Le 4125, rue Parthenais) - 2001
- Roger Toupin, épicier variété - 2003
- 3 sœurs en 2 temps - 2003
- Opération Retour - 2005
- Voici l'homme - 2006
- Nestor et les oubliés - 2006
- The River Where We Live (Un fleuve humain) - 2006
- Northern Greetings (Des nouvelles du nord) - 2007
- Junior - 2008
- Back to the New World (Retour en Amérique) - 2008
- Home of the Buffalo (Au pays des esprits) - 2009
- Turtles Do Not Die of Old Age (Les tortues ne meurent pas de vieillesse) - 2010
- Godin - 2011
- At Night, They Dance (La nuit, elles dansent) - 2011
- Mom et moi - 2011
- Riptide (Ressac) - 2013
- Le Puits - 2013
- Miron: Un homme revenu d'en dehors du monde - 2014
- Bus Story (Histoires de bus) - 2014
- Self(less) Portrait (Autoportrait sans moi) - 2014
- L'Œuvre des jours - 2015
- Tracing Arthur (Sur les traces d'Arthur) - 2016
- BGL Fancy (BGL de fantaisie) - 2017
- Song of a Seer (Les flâneries du voyant) - 2018
- Pauline Julien, Intimate and Political (Pauline Julien, intime et politique) - 2018
- A House for the Syrians - 2018
- Xalko - 2018
- Daughter of the Crater (La fille du cratère) - 2019
- Chaakapesh - 2019
- White Noise (Le fond de l'air) - 2019
- Ce qu'on porte - 2021
- Le bien-être - 2022
- A Night Song (Le chant de la nuit) - 2022
- Bloom (Jouvencelles) - 2022
- Circo - 2024
- Like a Spiral (Comme une spirale) - 2024
- Waiting for Casimir (En attendant Casimir) - 2024
