= Jorge Camarotti =

Brazilian-Canadian film director and screenwriter

Jorge Camarotti is a Brazilian-Canadian film director and screenwriter. He is most noted for his 2019 short film Kinship, which was a Canadian Screen Award nominee for Best Live Action Short Drama at the 8th Canadian Screen Awards in 2020.

Originally from São Paulo, Brazil, Camarotti moved to Montreal, Quebec in 2003 to study film at the Université de Montréal. He released his first short film, 165 Days, in 2014, and appeared in Charlotte Cardin's music video for "Like It Doesn't Hurt" in 2016.

His third short film, Ousmane, premiered at the 2021 Toronto International Film Festival, and received a Canadian Screen Award nomination for Best Live Action Short Drama at the 10th Canadian Screen Awards in 2022.
