= Like a Spiral =

2024 Canadian documentary film

- French: Comme une spirale
- Directed by: Lamia Chraibi
- Written by: Lamia Chraibi
- Produced by: Patricia Bergeron; Ghassan Fayad
- Cinematography: Ariane Lorrain
- Edited by: René Roberge
- Music by: Radwan Ghazi Moumneh
- Production company: Productions Leitmotiv
- Distributed by: Les Films du 3 mars
- Release date: September 27, 2024 (VIFF)
- Running time: 28 minutes
- Country: Canada
- Languages: French; Arabic; Tagalog; Sinhala

Like a Spiral (French: Comme une spirale) is a Canadian short documentary film, directed by Lamia Chraibi and released in 2024. The film documents the anonymous testimonies of five women living under the Kafala system in Beirut.

The film premiered at the 2024 Vancouver International Film Festival.

== Awards ==
Award	Date of ceremony	Category	Recipient(s)	Result	Ref.
Prix Iris	December 2025	Best Short Documentary	Lamia Chraibi, Patricia Bergeron, Ghassan Fayad	Nominated	
