= Glasses (film) =

- Directed by: Brian Duchscherer
- Written by: Erna Buffie; Brian Duchscherer
- Produced by: Marcy Page
- Starring: Sonja Ball; Jamieson Boulanger
- Edited by: Hannele Halm; Phyllis Lewis
- Music by: Judith Gruber-Stitzer
- Animation by: Brian Duchscherer
- Production company: National Film Board of Canada
- Release date: August 23, 2001 (FFM)
- Running time: 25 minutes
- Country: Canada

Glasses is a Canadian animated short film, directed by Brian Duchscherer and released in 2001. The film centres on Milo, a young boy with poor vision who gets new glasses, and turns his back on his best friend Gwenny when he finally has the opportunity to play soccer with the popular boys in school, only to learn a lesson about the value of true friendship when he breaks his glasses in the game and is cast back out of the group.

The film was a Genie Award nominee for Best Animated Short Film at the 23rd Genie Awards, and a Jutra Award nominee for Best Animated Short Film at the 4th Jutra Awards.
