= Molade =

Mọladé
- Gender: Unisex
- Language: Yoruba

Origin
- Origin: Yorubaland
- Meaning: The child is crown.
- Region of origin: Yorubaland [Nigeria, Benin, Togo]

Mọladé is a Yoruba given name and a surname. It is a unisex name of Yoruba origin, which means "The child is crown.". The name Mọladé is common among the royal families but now, it is a general name. The diminutive forms are Ọmọladé or Ladé.

== Notable individuals with the name ==
- Augustus Molade Akiwumi (1891–1985), Ghanaian lawyer and politician
- Molade Okoya-Thomas (1935–2015), Nigerian businessman

== See also ==
- Omolade
