= Kinship (2019 film) =

Canadian short film

- Film poster
- Directed by: Jorge Camarotti
- Written by: Jorge Camarotti
- Produced by: Maxime Bernard; François Delisle
- Starring: Rabah Aït Ouyahia; Ryan Nikirad
- Cinematography: Nicolas Canniccioni
- Edited by: Sophie B. Sylvestre
- Music by: Simon Gervais
- Production company: Films 53/12
- Distributed by: Fragments Distribution
- Release date: March 13, 2019 (Regard)
- Running time: 16 minutes
- Country: Canada
- Language: French

Kinship is a Canadian short drama film, directed by Jorge Camarotti and released in 2019. The film stars Rabah Aït Ouyahia as Rabah and Ryan Nikirad as Cédrick, a father and son struggling with their grief after the death of their wife and mother.

The film premiered in March 2019 at the Saguenay International Short Film Festival.

The film received a Canadian Screen Award nomination for Best Live Action Short Drama at the 8th Canadian Screen Awards in 2020.
