= The Wall Street Boy =

- Kalenjin: Kipkemboi
- Directed by: Charles Uwagbai
- Written by: Joel Richardson
- Produced by: Jennifer Jonas; Leonard Farlinger
- Starring: Thamela Mpumlwana
- Cinematography: Rudolf Blahacek
- Edited by: Jeremiah Munce
- Music by: Amin Bhatia
- Production companies: New Real Films; Zamaradi Productions
- Distributed by: ArtMattan Productions
- Release date: November 8, 2023 (AFRIFF)
- Running time: 90 minutes
- Countries: Kenya; Canada
- Language: English

The Wall Street Boy (Kalenjin: Kipkemboi) is a Kenyan-Canadian thriller drama film, directed by Charles Uwagbai and released in 2023. The film stars Thamela Mpumlwana as Kipkemboi, a young mathematical genius from rural Kenya who is forced to give up a scholarship to study at the Massachusetts Institute of Technology to stay with his family after his father dies, and then develops a computer algorithm that allows him to play the stock market and enrich his family and community.

The cast also includes Elsie Abang, Vinessa Antoine, Millicent Boella, Kevin Hanchard, David Cubitt, Elijah Morrison and Idrissa Sanogo in supporting roles.

The film premiered at the Africa International Film Festival in November 2023, before going into wider commercial release in 2024.

== Awards ==
Award	Date of ceremony	Category	Recipient(s)	Result	Ref(s)
Africa Movie Academy Awards	2024	Best Actress in a Supporting Role	Elsie Abang	Won	
Africa Movie Academy Awards	2024	Best Film by an African Living Abroad		Nominated	
Africa Movie Academy Awards	2024	Best Cinematography	Rudolf Blahacek	Nominated	
Africa Movie Academy Awards	2024	Best Editing	J.L. Munce	Nominated	
Africa Movie Academy Awards	2024	Best Production Design	Joel Richardson	Nominated	
Africa Movie Academy Awards	2024	Best Sound		Nominated	
Africa Movie Academy Awards	2024	Best Visual Effects		Nominated	
Directors Guild of Canada	2024	Best Production Design, Limited-Budget Film	Joel Richardson	Won	
NAACP Image Awards	2025	Outstanding International Motion Picture		Nominated	
Canadian Screen Awards	2025	Best Original Score	Amin Bhatia	Nominated	
