= Adrian Walters =

Canadian actor

Adrian Walters is a Canadian actor from Toronto, Ontario. He is most noted for his leading performance in the 2025 film It Comes in Waves, for which he won both the award for Outstanding Lead Performance at the 2025 Reelworld Film Festival, and the ACTRA Toronto Award for Outstanding Performance, Male in 2026.

He has also appeared in the film Out Standing, and has had supporting or guest roles in the television series The Border, The Listener, Heroes Reborn, Lost & Found Music Studios, Private Eyes, Played, Schitt's Creek, The Handmaid's Tale, Pure, Dare Me, Nurses, Diggstown, The Porter, Star Trek: Discovery and Hudson & Rex.
