= Lamia Chraibi =

Franco–Moroccan film producer

Lamia Chraïbi
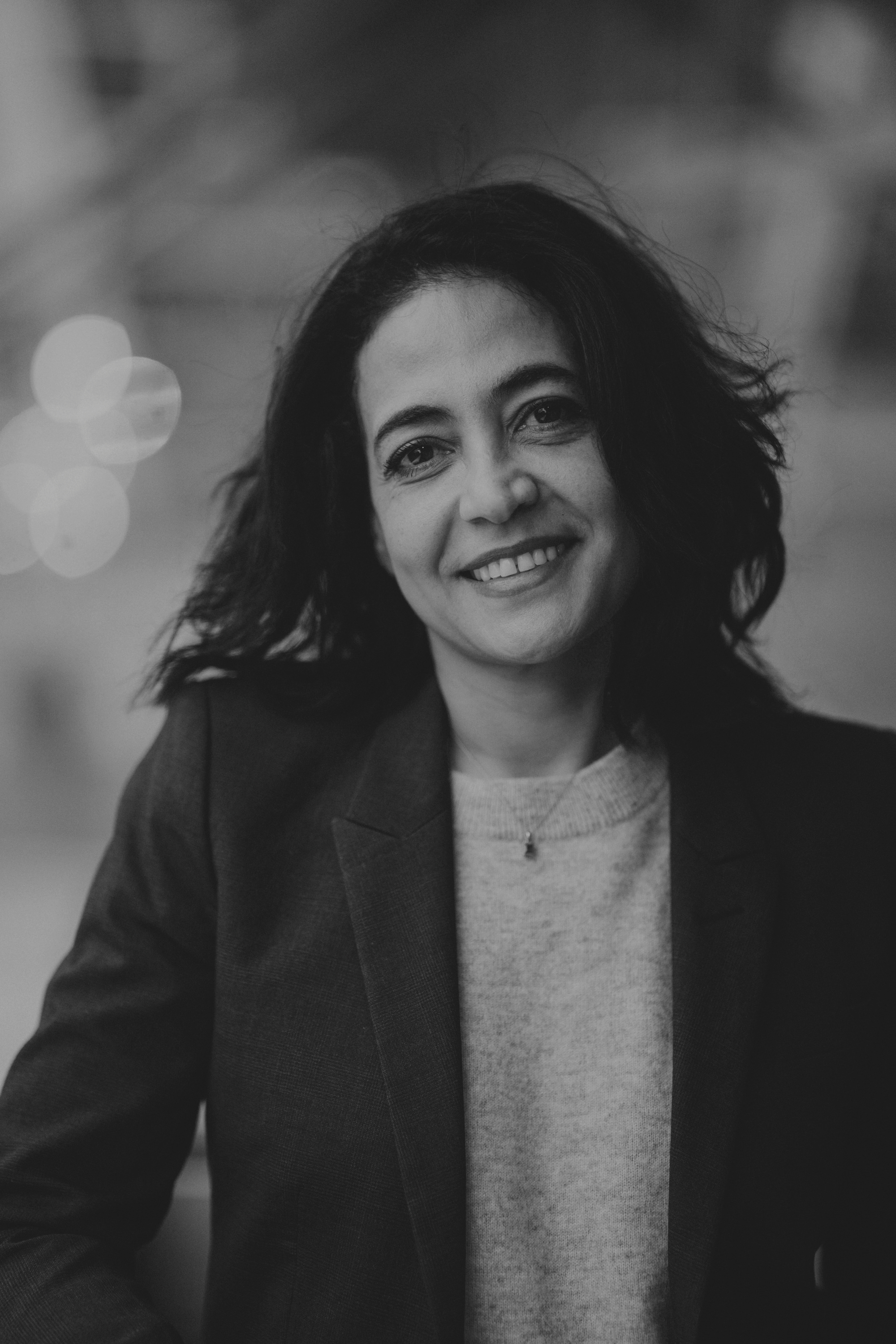
- Born: Lamia Chraïbi; Morocco
- Education: INSA Hauts-de-France
- Occupation: Film producer
- Years active: 1997–present
- Website: https://laprod.ma

Lamia Chraïbi, is a Franco–Moroccan film producer.

== Personal life ==
Chraïbi studied audiovisual communication management in France at Valenciennes.

== Career ==
In 2007, she founded 'La Prod' production company in Casablanca and in 2011, she founded the production company 'Moon a Deal Films' located in Paris.

In 2016, she co-produced the film Mimosas with Oliver Laxe. The film received critical acclaim and later won the Grand Prize of the Critics’ Week at the Cannes Film Festival in 2016. Then she produced the film Tegnap directed by Balint Kenyeres. The film was premiered at Locarno Film Festival. In 2018, she produced Achoura, a Moroccan fantasy film directed by Talal Selhami. The film became the Best Film Award at Hardline Festival as well as received Special Mention of the Jury at Sitges Fantastic Film Festival.

She has been based in Montreal, Quebec, since 2014.

== Filmography ==
Year	Film	Role	Genre	Ref.
2009	Terminus des anges	Producer	Feature Film	
2011	Un Film	Producer	Feature Film	
2011	L'amante du RIF	CoProducer and executive producer	Feature Film	
2011	The End	Producer	Feature Film	
2015	The Sea Is Behind	Producer	Feature Film	
2016	Mimosas	Coproducer	Feature Film	
2017	Hier	Coproducer	Feature Film	
2018	Jahilya	Producer	Feature Film	
2019	Apatride	Producer	Feature Film	
2020	Urgent	Producer	Feature Film	
2020	Achoura	Producer	Feature Film	
2021	Mica	Producer	Feature Film	
2021	School of Hope	Producer	Documentary	
2021	Ziyara	Producer	Documentary	
2021	Genet Notre Père Des Fleurs	Producer	Documentary	
2023	Sisterhood (HLM Pussy)	Coproducer	Feature Film	
2024	Circo	Director	Feature documentary	
2024	Like a Spiral (Comme une spirale)	Director	Short documentary	
2025	Thank You, Satan	Producer	Feature Film	
	All Inclusive (in Post-production)	Coproducer	Feature Film	
	Bella (In development)	Producer	Feature Film	
	Meskoun (In development)	Producer	Series	
	Noor (In development)	Producer	Series	
	Miara (In development)	Producer	Series	

== Awards ==
Award	Year	Category	Work	Result	Reference
Directors Guild of Canada	2025	Jean-Marc Vallée DGC Discovery Award	Circo	Longlisted	
Reelworld Film Festival	2025	Outstanding Feature Film Director	Circo	Won	
Reelworld Film Festival	2025	Outstanding Documentary	Circo	Won	
Prix Iris	December 2025	Best Short Documentary	Like a Spiral (Comme une spirale) with Patricia Bergeron, Ghassan Fayad	Nominated	

== See also ==
- Arts in Marrakech (AiM) International Biennale
