= Ousmane (film) =

2021 Canadian short drama film

- Directed by: Jorge Camarotti
- Written by: Jorge Camarotti
- Produced by: Jorge Camarotti
- Starring: Isaka Sawadogo; Marie-Ginette Guay
- Cinematography: Nicolas Canniccioni
- Edited by: Jorge Camarotti
- Distributed by: Spira
- Release date: September 11, 2021 (TIFF)
- Running time: 25 minutes
- Country: Canada
- Language: French

Ousmane is a Canadian short drama film, directed by Jorge Camarotti and released in 2021. The film stars Isaka Sawadogo as Ousmane, a Burkinabé immigrant newly resident in Montreal, who finds his neighbour Édith (Marie-Ginette Guay) disoriented in the hall when he is returning home from work.

The film was screened for distributors at the Cannes Film Market in July 2021, and had its official premiere at the 2021 Toronto International Film Festival.

The film was a Canadian Screen Award nominee for Best Live Action Short Drama at the 10th Canadian Screen Awards, and a Prix Iris nominee for Best Live Action Short Film at the 24th Quebec Cinema Awards.
