= Circo (film) =

2024 Canadian documentary film

- Directed by: Lamia Chraibi
- Written by: Lamia Chraibi; Yza Nouiga
- Produced by: Patricia Bergeron; Lamia Chraibi
- Cinematography: Marcel Mueller
- Edited by: René Roberge
- Production company: Productions Leitmotiv
- Distributed by: Les Films du 3 mars
- Release date: November 21, 2024 (RIDM)
- Running time: 87 minutes
- Country: Canada
- Language: Portuguese

Circo is a Canadian documentary film, directed by Lamia Chraibi and released in 2024. The film is a portrait of Richard, a queer Brazilian circus performer who turns to drag to support himself after his adoptive mother kicks him out of her home.

The film premiered in November 2024 at the Montreal International Documentary Festival, before going into wider commercial release in July 2025.

== Awards ==
Award	Year	Category	Recipient	Result	Reference
Directors Guild of Canada	2025	Jean-Marc Vallée DGC Discovery Award	Lamia Chraibi	Longlisted	
Reelworld Film Festival	2025	Outstanding Feature Film Director	Lamia Chraibi	Won	
Reelworld Film Festival	2025	Outstanding Documentary	Lamia Chraibi	Won	
