= It Comes in Waves (film) =

2025 Canadian drama film

- Directed by: Fitch Jean
- Written by: Sammy Mohamed; Fitch Jean
- Produced by: Amir Zargara
- Starring: Adrian Walters; Nendia Lewars; Oluniké Adeliyi
- Cinematography: Jelan Maxwell
- Edited by: Fitch Jean
- Music by: Caroline-Jayne Gleave
- Production companies: Zargara Productions; Lenz Films
- Distributed by: Mongrel Media
- Release date: June 14, 2025 (ABFF)
- Running time: 105 minutes
- Country: Canada
- Language: English

It Comes in Waves is a Canadian drama film, directed by Fitch Jean and released in 2025. The film centres on a family from Rwanda, who are reestablishing their lives after moving to Ottawa, Ontario as refugees, with Akai (Adrian Walters) being forced to step up and take care of his younger sister Zera (Nendia Lewars) after their mother's health takes an unexpected decline.

The cast also includes Oluniké Adeliyi, Marium Carvell, Tomas Chovanec, Katherine Stella Duncan, Chidubem Rafael Echendu, Tim Finnigan, Franckie Francois, Kaburere Ganda, Ron J. Hamelin, Emmanuel Kabongo, Stefan Keyes, Camille Ella Laborde, Brandon McKnight, Elijah Obasi, Mittal Patel and Ryan Rosery in supporting roles.

The film premiered at the American Black Film Festival in June 2025, and had its Canadian premiere at the 2025 Cinéfest Sudbury International Film Festival. It was also screened as the opening film of the 2025 Reelworld Film Festival.

== Awards ==
Award	Year	Category	Recipient	Result	Reference
Reelworld Film Festival	2025	Outstanding Feature Film	Fitch Jean	Won	
Reelworld Film Festival	2025	Outstanding Feature Film Writer	Sammy Mohammed	Won	
Reelworld Film Festival	2025	Outstanding Feature Film Producer	Amir Zargara	Won	
Reelworld Film Festival	2025	Outstanding Feature Film Actor	Adrian Walters	Won	
Reelworld Film Festival	2025	Outstanding Feature Film Cinematographer	Jelan Maxwell	Won	
ACTRA Toronto Awards	2026	Outstanding Performance, Male	Adrian Walters	Won	
