= Riptide (2013 film) =

- Film poster
- French: Ressac
- Directed by: Pascale Ferland
- Written by: Pascale Ferland
- Produced by: Pascale Ferland
- Starring: Nicole-Sylvie Lagarde; Muriel Dutil; Clémence Dufresne-Deslières
- Cinematography: Philippe Roy
- Edited by: René Roberge
- Music by: Luc Bouchard; Éric Morin
- Production company: Les Films de l'Autre
- Distributed by: K Films Amerique
- Release date: August 27, 2013 (FFM)
- Running time: 97 minutes
- Country: Canada
- Language: French

Riptide (French: Ressac) is a Canadian drama film, directed by Pascale Ferland and released in 2013. Set in the Gaspésie region of Quebec, the film begins with the death of Édouard (Bobby Beshro) in an industrial accident soon after leaving town to seek work in the city, and centres on the effects of his death on his mother-in-law Dorine (Muriel Dutil), wife Gemma (Nicole-Sylvie Lagarde) and daughter Chloé (Clémence Dufresne-Deslières).

The cast also includes Martin Dubreuil as Philippe, with whom Gemma was having an extramarital affair, and Pierre-Luc Lafontaine as Richard, a young man who becomes a love interest for Chloé.

The film premiered in August 2013 at the Montreal World Film Festival, before opening commercially in December.

Dutil received a Jutra Award nomination for Best Supporting Actress at the 16th Jutra Awards in 2014.

== Cast ==
- Martin Dubreuil as Philippe
- Clémence Dufresne-Deslières as Chloe
- Muriel Dutil as Dorine
- Pierre-Luc Lafontaine as Richard
- Nicole-Sylvie Lagarde as Gemma
- Anne Lapierre as Estelle
- Pierre Limoges as Antoine
