= Bite of a Mango =

2022 Canadian comedy-drama film

- Theatrical release poster
- Directed by: Ron Dias
- Written by: Joanne Jansen, Ron Dias
- Produced by: Joanne Jansen, Ron Dias
- Starring: Jayne Kamara; Ryan Rosery; Orville Cummings; Nathan Taylor; Shawna Stewart
- Cinematography: Ayodele Adeoye and Ron Dias
- Edited by: Ron Dias, Joanne Jansen
- Production company: Ron and Aussie Productions
- Distributed by: AMC Networks; AllBlk
- Release dates: June 28, 2022 (American Black Film Festival); October 15, 2022 (ReelWorld Film Festival)
- Running time: 97 minutes
- Country: Canada
- Languages: English, Patois

Bite of a Mango is a 2022 Canadian drama/comedy film written by Joanne Jansen and Ron Dias and directed by Dias in his directorial debut. The film stars Jayne Kamara, Ryan Rosery, Orville Cummings, Nathan Taylor, and Shawna Stewart.

The movie had its world premiere at the American Black Film Festival on June 18, 2022, and its Canadian premiere at the ReelWorld Film Festival.

Bite of a Mango was acquired by AllBlk, an AMC streaming platform set to release March 23, 2023.

== Plot ==
After a casual hook up between Jayne and Tray in the early stages of lockdown when Covid-19 was first introduced to the world, Jayne, a strikingly independent half-Nigerian half-Jamaican woman, is left feeling alone in dealing with an unplanned pregnancy. In Jayne’s absence, Tray seeks the friendship of an old flame only to realize how he truly feels about Jayne.

In addition to now having to divide their time between their friendships with Jayne and Tray, with the Black Lives Matter movement rising to new heights, Rowe and Chris find themselves on different ends of the spectrum of activism. As Chris becomes more of a leader in the space, Rowe starts dating someone white, and is left feeling like an outsider in his own community.

As the world changed with the murder of George Floyd, Chris decides to create a space for Black people to be safe and talk. Rowe was insensitive to this as he still invited his White girlfriend, causing friction between everyone.

Jayne soon learns how Tray really feels and decides to continue with the pregnancy without him until talking to her father to mend things for the child's sake. With new life, the foursome consider second chances and reconcile their differences to keep their group together.

== Production ==
Joanne Jansen and Ron Dias wrote the script in two days during the height of the COVID-19 pandemic in Canada, drawing inspiration with what was going in the world in 2020. It was filmed over five days during the pandemic. The team of four took all necessary precautions to ensure a safe environment while the rest of the industry was shut down. In order to keep the budget under $10,000, Dias and Jansen wore multiple hats including editing, colouring, sound composing, cinematography and set decorating.

== Cast ==
- Jayne Kamara as Jayne
- Ryan Rosery as Tray
- Orville Cummings as Rowe
- Nathan Taylor as Chris
- Shawna Stewart as Missy
- Yana Gold as Rebecca
- Bianca Nugara as Maya
- Dorren Lee as Dr. Leslie Taylor

== Awards ==
At the Reelworld Film Festival, the film won the Audience Choice Award and Jayne Kamara won Outstanding actress in a feature film.
