= Oladejo Victor Akinlonu =

Nigerian-born artist (1963–2023)

Oladejo Victor Akinlonu (15 November 1963 – 24 January 2023) (also known as The custodian of Art or Dejak Artistique) was a Nigerian-born artist, sculptor, philosopher and art marketer. He came into public prominence in the 1980s as the pioneer of rubble stone landscape features. He is also known for his sculptures which can be seen at public places all over Nigeria and his landmark intricate designs on waterfalls, fountains and tombstones. He is seen as an artist who blends sculpture with architecture. in 1998 he was awarded the title the custodian of art by the Nigerian society of journalists and he has been awarded several other titles due to his immense contribution to the art industry in Nigeria and Africa as a whole. He was the chairman and managing director of Dejak and Associates which consists of Bezalel Galleria and Dejak Artistique (an art gallery located in the capital of Lagos, in existence for 31 years).

Born the son of a notary, Gilbert Akinlonu, and a merchant, Grace Akinlonu in Ondo town, Ondo state, Dejo had his art gallery located in Lagos, Ikeja, on land awarded him by the Lagos state government.

Dejo is renowned primarily as a sculptor and landscape artist and also widely regarded to be an eccentric. Two of his works, the eyo masquerade and Oba Adeniji Adele statue are among the most famous of his work, their fame approached only by Ben Enwonwu's Sango in Nigeria.
