= Donigan Cumming =

American-born Canadian multimedia artist

- Born: July 5, 1947 (age 79); Danville, Virginia, U.S.
- Education: Florida State University; Concordia University
- Known for: Multimedia artist

Donigan Cumming (born 1947) is an American-born Canadian multimedia artist who uses photography, video, drawing, sound, and text in experimental documentary films, collages, installations, and books based in Montreal, Quebec. Since 1983, Cumming's work has contributed to Canadian and international festivals and exhibitions dealing with themes of the body, truth/fiction, taboos of representation, and social engagement.

== Education ==
Cumming obtained a B.Sc. from Florida State University (Tallahassee, Florida) in 1978 and completed an M.F.A. at Concordia University (Montreal, Quebec) in 1985.

== Career ==
Cumming's major solo exhibitions, beginning with photography and sound installations, include Reality and Motive in Documentary Photography (New York and Paris, 1986), The Mirror, the Hammer and the Stage (Chicago, 1990), Diverting the Image (Windsor, 1993), Pretty Ribbons (Arles, 1994), Harry's Diary (New York, 1994), Les Pleureurs (Paris, 1995), La Répétition (Lausanne, 1996), Barber's Music (Ottawa, 1999), Moving Stills (Montreal, 1999 and Rotterdam, 2000), and Gimlet Eye (Cardiff, 2001). In 2005, Moving Pictures, curated by Peggy Gale at the Museum of Contemporary Canadian Art (Toronto), presented a survey of Cumming's work in a variety of media, including video, photography, and mixed-media and featuring the large-scale encaustic collage Prologue and Epilogue, which went on to be featured in Donigan Cumming: La somme, le sommeil, le cauchemar, curated by Catherine Bédard for Le Mois de la Photo à Paris (Centre culturel, Paris, 2006). A residence undertaken at Centre VU (Quebec City) resulted in Kincora, a large suite of drawings printed in inkjet and exhibited at VU and La Galerie Éric Devlin in 2008.

A survey of Cumming's work in multimedia, photography, and video was presented in the 2008 exhibition Ex Votos at Mount Saint Vincent University Art Gallery (Halifax).

Cumming's video works have screened in Canada and internationally since he took up video in 1995. In 1998, the International Film Festival Rotterdam (IFFR) featured Cumming's work in the program The Cruel Machine. In 2000, his video installation Moving Stills was featured in the IFFR's Exploding Cinema, while his work Fountain premiered at the IFFR in 2005. Cumming's videos have screened at the New York Video Festival, the Whitney Museum of American Art, Anthology Film Archives, and the Museum of Modern Art, and have also shown regularly at the Festival du Nouveau Cinéma. Two retrospectives of his video work were organized in 2002, at the Pacific Film Archive (Berkeley, California) and at Visions du Réel, Nyon International Film Festival (Switzerland). The Cinémathèque québécoise, in collaboration with Vidéographe, presented a retrospective of Donigan Cumming's works in 2014. In 2015, Cumming's video Culture was included in the program L'œil du photographe : la photographie et le documentaire poétique / A Photographer's Eye: Photography and the Poetic Documentary at the Festival 2015 Rencontres internationales du documentaire de Montréal, complemented by a multimedia installation, A Life in Photography: Kerr's Suitcase.

Two anthologies published in 2015 included entries on Cumming's photographic work: Une Collection. Maison européenne de la photographie (Arles: Actes Sud, 2015); and The Thames & Hudson Dictionary of Photography, ed. Nathalie Herschdorfer (London: Thames & Hudson Ltd., 2015). His artist book, Kerr's Suitcase (Montreal: Maquam Press, 2016) marked a return to photographic themes of loss and recovery. A commissioned work for the Centre culturel canadien in Paris exhibition, Image… envoyée…/Image…sent (2020) combined motifs of grief and confinement ). These were extended in a series of still lifes, Even as the Falcon Plummets, begun in 2020, and first published as a portfolio with statement in Border Crossings in 2022. Even as the Falcon Plummets appeared in two forms: as a suite of large and immersive colour prints; as a boxed set of 12 inkjet prints, paradoxically referring to naturalist John James Audubon's Birds of America. In 2023, Cumming completed the third element in the cycle, Falcon's Guide, a folio-sized bookwork of details.

== Characters and themes ==
Cumming's first video, A Prayer for Nettie (1995, winner, Telefilm Canada Video Prize for Canadian Discoveries, 1996), was an elegiac work produced following the death of Cumming's long-time subject and collaborator, Nettie Harris, who also featured centrally in Pretty Ribbons. A Prayer for Nettie also marks Cumming's transition from photography to video, and features several of the individuals who had figured in Cumming's photographic work, including Albert Ross Smith, Raymond Beaudoin, Joyce Donnison, Nelson Coombs, Gerald Harvey, and Geoffrey Bates. An additional cast of characters is introduced in Cumming's 1996 video, Cut the Parrot, a video produced for the deceased Albert, and introducing Beatrice Johnson, Elizabeth Barclay, Susan Thomson, James Carter, and Gordon Alexander. These interwoven human connections are central to the work, as critic Mike Hoolboom has observed: Cumming is “part of the scene.”

In the 1997 After Brenda (winner, Barbara Aronofsky Latham Memorial Award, 11th Annual Dallas Video Festival, 1998), Cumming introduces Colin Kane and Pierre Lamarche, who figure centrally in subsequent video works Erratic Angel (1998, winner, Telefilm Canada Prize for the best Canadian Short or Medium-Length Film or Video, 1998) and Petit Jésus, respectively. Four Storeys (1999) focuses on Colleen Faber who, with Kane, is a lead character in the 2000 work If Only I. Martin Corbin, who makes a short appearance in If Only I, is the main focus of My Dinner with Weegee (2001, winner, Best Quebec Documentary, Quebec Cinema Critics Award, 2002). Harvey returns in Voice Off (2003), accompanied by Gordon Verge, who was featured in the short video Wrap (2000).

Cumming's subjects regularly make cameo appearances in the form of photographs and voice-overs in many of Cumming's other videos, reflecting what Marcy Goldberg has written about Cumming's work: "…it wouldn't be a classic Cumming work if it weren't also a commentary on the activity of capturing other people in still and moving images. The multiple meanings of the film's title—anthropological, aesthetic and scientific-biological—hint at the multifaceted nature of the impulse to document other people's lives."

Cumming's video works from 2005 to 2007, including Fountain (2005), and 3 (2007), draw systematically on his archives. Monument (2008), and Pencils, Ashes, Matches & Dust (2009) take on more abstract and conceptual forms, and mark a shift into animation. His 2010 Too Many Things returns to his long-time community of human subjects in a commentary on friendship and obsolescence. In the tragi-comedy Exit Interview (2014), this shrinking community's resident documentary filmmaker is being fired. Out of Kerr's Suitcase (2016) reunites Cumming with two characters who first appeared in his photographic cycle Reality and Motive in Documentary Photography (1986) as they reminisce about lives lived before the camera.

In 2018, the Rendez-vous du cinéma Québecois premiered Cumming's The Seven Wonders of the World (2018), a compilation of too-close observation, animation and stolen moments, in its Art and Experimentation program.

== Filmography ==
- A Prayer for Nettie (1995)
- Cut the Parrot (1996)
- After Brenda (1997)
- Karaoke (1998)
- Erratic Angel (1998)
- Shelter (1999)
- Petit Jésus (1999)
- Trip (1999)
- Four Storeys (1999)
- Continuity and Rupture (1999, VHS Box Set Compilation)
- A Short Lesson (2000)
- Docu-Duster (2000)
- Wrap (2000)
- If Only I (2000)
- My Dinner with Weegee (2001)
- Culture (2002)
- Locke's Way (2003)
- Cold Harbor (2003)
- Voice off (2003)
- Controlled Disturbance (2005, DVD Box Set Compilation)
- Fountain (2005)
- 3 (2007)
- Monument (2008)
- Pencils, Ashes, Matches & Dust (2009)
- Too Many Things (2010)
- Exit Interview (2014)
- Out of Kerr's Suitcase (2016)
- The Seven Wonders of the World (2018)

== Bibliography ==
- Langford, Martha (ed). Donigan Cumming: Reality and Motive in Documentary Photography. Essay by Robert Graham. Ottawa: Canadian Museum of Contemporary Photography, 1986.
- Cumming, Donigan. The Stage. Montreal: Maquam Press, 1991.
- Gingras, Nicole (ed). Donigan Cumming: Diverting the Image. Windsor: Art Gallery of Windsor, 1993.
- Herzog, Hans Michael (ed). Donigan Cumming: Pretty Ribbons. Zurich: Edition Stemmle AG, 1996.
- Forget, Claude (ed). Continuité et rupture : 5 bandes de Donigan Cumming / Continuity and Rupture: 5 Tapes by Donigan Cumming. Montreal: Cinéma Libre, 1999.
- Bédard, Catherine (ed). Donigan Cumming : Continuité et rupture. Centre Culturel Canadien / Ambassade du Canada à Paris, 2000.
- Cumming, Donigan. Gimlet Eye. Cardiff: Ffotogallery Wales and Chapter, 2001.
- Cumming, Donigan. Lying Quiet. Toronto: Museum of Contemporary Canadian Art, 2004.
- Cumming, Donigan. La somme, le sommeil, le cauchemar. Centre culturel Canadian / Ambassade du Canada à Paris, 2006.
- Langford, Martha. “A Forgotten Man,” Scissors, Paper, Stone: Expressions of Memory in Contemporary Photographic Art. Montreal: McGill-Queen's University Press, 2007, 57-74.
- Cumming, Donigan. Kincora. Montreal: Maquam Press, 2008.
- Cumming, Donigan. Pencil, Ashes, Matches & Dust. Quebec: Éditions J’ai VU, Collection Livres d’artistes, 2009.
- Birdwise, Scott (ed). Splitting the Choir: The Moving Images of Donigan Cumming. Ottawa: Canadian Film Institute, 2011.
- Cumming, Donigan and Brouillard, Matthieu. Coming Through the Fog. Alma and Montreal: SAGAMIE édition d’art, in collaboration with the FOFA Gallery, 2012.
- Choinière, France (ed). Donigan Cumming: Monographie. Montreal and Quebec: Dazibao and VU, 2012.
- Ladd, Jeffrey (ed). Donigan Cumming: The Stage. Books on Books No. 19. New York, NY: Errata Editions, 2014.
- Cumming, Donigan. Kerr's Suitcase. Montreal: Maquam Press, 2015.
- Tremble, Julie (ed). Body-to-Body: The Works of Donigan Cumming = Corps-à-corps : l’œuvre de Donigan Cumming. Essays by Zoë Tousignant and Fabrice Montal. Interview with Jean Perret. Montreal: Vidéographe, 2020. Web publication. In English In French
- Cumming, Donigan. Even as the Falcon Plummets. A limited edition of five boxed sets of twelve photographs published by Donigan Cumming, 2022.
- Cumming, Donigan. “Even as the Falcon Plummets,” Border Crossings 160 (2022): 136-145.
- Birdwise, Scott (ed). Splitting the Choir: The Moving Images of Donigan Cumming. A collection of nine essays, a script (Wrap) and interview by Scott Birdwise. Republished web edition, 2023.
- Cumming, Donigan. Falcon's Guide. A limited edition book of photographs published by Donigan Cumming, 2023
- Graham, Robert. ”Neighbourhood Watch: Health and Care in the Videography of Donigan Cumming (2017).” http://robertgraham.ca/neighbourhood-watch-health-and-care-in-the-videography-of-donigan-cumming/. Retrieved 24 August 24, 2023.
