= Tar Angel =

2001 film directed by Denis Chouinard

- French: L'Ange de goudron
- Directed by: Denis Chouinard
- Produced by: Roger Frappier; Luc Vandal
- Starring: Zinedine Soualem; Hiam Abbass; Rabah Aït Ouyahia
- Cinematography: Guy Dufaux
- Edited by: Richard Comeau
- Music by: Bertrand Chénier
- Production company: Max Films
- Distributed by: Epicentre Films; Vivafilm
- Release date: August 23, 2001 (MWFF)
- Running time: 100 minutes
- Country: Canada
- Language: French

Tar Angel (French: L'Ange de goudron) is a Canadian drama film, released in 2001.

Directed by Denis Chouinard, the film stars Zinedine Soualem as Ahmet Kasmi, the patriarch of a family of Algerian refugees in Montreal whose values are tested when his oldest son Hafid (Rabah Aït Ouyahia) joins an anti-globalization activist group, sparking Ahmet's fears that the family may be denied Canadian citizenship. The film's cast also includes Hiam Abbass, Catherine Trudeau, Kenza Abiabdillah, Marc Beaupré, Raymond Cloutier, François Papineau and Maude Guérin.

The film premiered at the Montreal World Film Festival in 2001 and won the award for Best Canadian Film.

The film garnered three Genie Award nominations at the 22nd Genie Awards in 2002, for Best Actor (Soualem), Best Director (Chouinard) and Best Original Score (Bertrand Chénier). The film also garnered eight Jutra Award nominations, including Best Picture and Best Director.
