= Like Father, Like Son (Charles Onyeabor album) =

Studio album by Charles Onyeabor
- Released: 17 November 2023
- Genre: Funk; RnB; Afrobeats; Hip-hop; Dancehall; Highlife

Singles from Like Father, Like Son
- 1. "They Can't Pull Us Down" Released: December 2020

Like Father, Like Son is the debut studio album by Nigerian singer Charles Onyeabor which was released on 17 November 2023. The album comprises twenty tracks and was recorded in English, Nigerian Pidgin, Igbo and Italian. Consisting of genres; rhythm and blues, funk, Afrobeats, hip hop, dance and highlife, Like Father, Like Son explores themes "such as gratefulness, solemnity, appraisal, encouragement, pride, life of the party, and regrets, love, heartbreaks, amongst others".

== Background ==
Like Father, Like Son is Charles Onyeabor's debut album which comprises twenty tracks and is a mixture of rhythm and blues, funk, Afrobeats, hip hop, dance and highlife. The album was recorded in English, Nigerian Pidgin, Igbo and Italian. It explores themes "such as gratefulness, solemnity, appraisal, encouragement, pride, life of the party, and regrets, love, heartbreaks, amongst others".

Onyeabor dedicated Like Father, Like Son to his father, William Onyeabor who died in 2017. On the cover art, Onyeabor noted: "There is a lion and a cub on the album cover. My father is represented by the lion, and I am represented by the cub."

== Music and lyrics ==
=== Track 1—10 ===
The album opens with "Feeling Good" which features "the play of gentle strings, and later accompanied by the keyboard and drums." This single is followed by "Ije Nwoke" featuring Ejima. It "alludes to the workaholism inherent in the gene of an Igbo man." This was followed by a 3 minutes titular single featuring Magnito, "Like Father Like Son" which acts as a tribute to Onyeabor's father, William Onyeabor. The single starts off with the play of violin, followed by a drum and piano. In "Sawa", Onyeabor praises the body of a woman and the effect she has on him.

In "Anyi No O Na-Eme" the Igbo language track employs Amapiano-beat to convey the "life of the party". The next track talks about the importance of humanity and love in "We All Need More Love" which transit to "Grateful" explores the theme of appreciation using fast tempo beat with help from choristers. In "Charlie", a heavy percussion Amapiano track, Onyeabor narrates stories of his life and challenges. The ninth single, "Do It Your Way" which features Évry is an Italian song. Mojisoluwa describes it a motivational song.

Featuring guitars, drums and pianos, "Still Your Baby" which features Creep Guliano is dedicated to Onyeabor's mother. The single features the use of Italian language. Mojisoluwa describes it as emotional.

=== Track 11—20 ===
The eleventh single, "Nwa" is composed of drums and piano and sung in Igbo language and English; Onyeabor expresses his love to his lover.

The twelfth track "They Can't Pull Us Down" featuring Miriam Taylor is a funky single which incorporates "mildly deepened drums, and sax". With an intro of piano and drums, "Loving Till The End" preaches love. Mojisoluwa praised the lyrics of the song. The fourteenth to sixteenth track, "Come and Roll" featuring Vic2Kul, "Jolly" and "Low" featuring Emeka Onyeabor are Amapiano-themed tracks. In "Bye Bye To My Ex Love", Onyeabor renders a farewell song and talks about Christmas love in "We Fell in Love in Christmas". In "Dance Your Troubles Away" Onyeabor tells his listeners to dance their sorrows away. The album was concluded with a refix of the fourth single, "Sawa".

== Reception ==
Affa Acho of Leadership praised the production of the album, Onyeabor's songwriting while calling it "impressive run of play". While Alao Abiodun of The Nation noted that: "Charles ingeniously blended the old and the new, preserving his father's legacy while also carving a new path in the music scene."

Michael Adeshina of P.M. News concluded that "[t]his album connotes the musical abilities that run from the artiste's father."
