= Abisola Omolade =

Nigerian art director

Abisola Abolaji Omolade is a Nigerian fashion critic, fashion journalist, art director, production designer, beauty queen, and former accountant.

== Early life and career ==
Abisola Abolaji Omolade was born into the family of Oluseyi Rasheed Omolade and Omonike Sabinah Omolade in Ado Ekiti in Ekiti State. She holds a degree in accounting from Olabisi Onabanjo University in 2010, a Screenwriting degree from Met Film School in 2012 and a degree in The Business and Art of Television from London Film School.

In 2008, Omolade contested the Sisi Oge beauty pageant and Miss Nigeria beauty pageant in 2011. She is the founder of Gabrielle Chase Media limited and Meraki Projects; a co-founder of The Sabinah Foundation and The Sabinah Preparatory School. Omolade began her career at Ark Resources Entertainment as an art assistant, a studio assistant, and a programs officer. She is the production designer of We Don't Live Here Anymore which earned her a nomination in the "Best Production Design" category in the 2018 Best of Nollywood Awards and King of Boys.

Omolade is the art director of Netflix's The Wait, Blood Sisters, Far From Home, HBO's Eyimofe and Amazon Prime's La Femme Anjola and was the host of a 104-episode series Living Luxury which aired on DSTV. In 2023, Omolade art directed Orah which screened at the 2023 Toronto International Film Festival.

She won the Best Art Direction at the 2024 Africa Magic Viewers' Choice Awards for the movie Over The Bridge.

== Personal life ==
Omolade is to married Olanrewaju Peter Effiong whom she has two children with.
