= Adesope Olajide =

Nigerian media personality

- Born: Adesope Olajide; March 4, 1977 (age 49); Ibadan, Nigeria
- Other names: Shopsydoo, Energy Gawd
- Education: Loyola College, Ibadan (Highschool)
- Alma mater: University of Ado Ekiti (BA Botany)
- Occupations: media personality, radio and television personality, talk show host, event host and podcaster
- Years active: 2003–present
- Known for: The Afrobeats Podcast
- Website: adesope.co.uk

Adesope Olajide (born 4 March) professionally known as Shopsydoo or Energy Gawd, is a Nigerian UK-based media personality, radio and television presenter, talk show host, event host and podcaster. He is the host of The Afrobeats Podcast, a show focused on afropop and Afrobeats culture.

== Early life and education ==
Adesope Olajide was born at Ibadan, Nigeria. He had his early education at Ibadan, and commenced his Secondary School at Loyola College, Ibadan. He studied at University of Ado Ekiti in Ado-Ekiti and earned a bachelor's degree in Botany. After his University Education, Adesope moved to the United Kingdom in 2002.

== Media career ==
=== Radio and television ===
Adesope began his media career in 2003 and first worked at N -N-Power FM London. He later joined Voice of Africa Radio London and served as an online host for Factory 78 TV Network in 2010. Early 2014, he joined Vox Africa TV UK (the first pan-African, bilingual, and independent television channel in the UK) as host of "Live at Battersea". He also served as host of Nolly Afrobeats on Nollywood Movies Sky 329. He served as anchor for Ben Television Sports Show "ABC Sports". In 2014 Adesocpe served as host of weekly music program " Afrohits on The Beat” at The Beat London 103.6FM, a position he held for a period of ten years.

=== Podcast ===
He started a weekly podcast show The Afrobeats Podcast, (an afro pop and afrobeats culture show) in September 2020 and has been a recurring guest such as: Stonebwoy, CKay, Rema, Fuse ODG, Brymo, Don Jazzy, Sarkodie, Camidoh, King Promise,Fireboy DML, Darkovibes, King Promise,Ruger, Timaya, Diamond Platnumz, Yemi Alade, Gyakie, Blaqbonez, among others.

== Awards and nominations ==
Year	Award ceremony	Prize	Result	Ref
2011	BEFFTA Awards	Best Presenter (TV)	Won	
2016	African Pride Awards	TV/Radio Personality of the year	Won	
2013	Nigerian Broadcasters Merit Awards	African TV Presenter of the Year-Male	Won	
2015	Nigerian Broadcasters Merit Awards	Sexiest On Air Personality-Male	Nominated	
