= Stéphane Thibault =

Attorney general of Monaco since 2023

Monaco Attorney General
- Incumbent
- Assumed office 1 September 2023

Stéphane Thibault is a French magistrate who has served as the attorney general of the Principality of Monaco since 1 September 2023.
