= Oyin Oladejo =

Nigerian actress (born 1985)

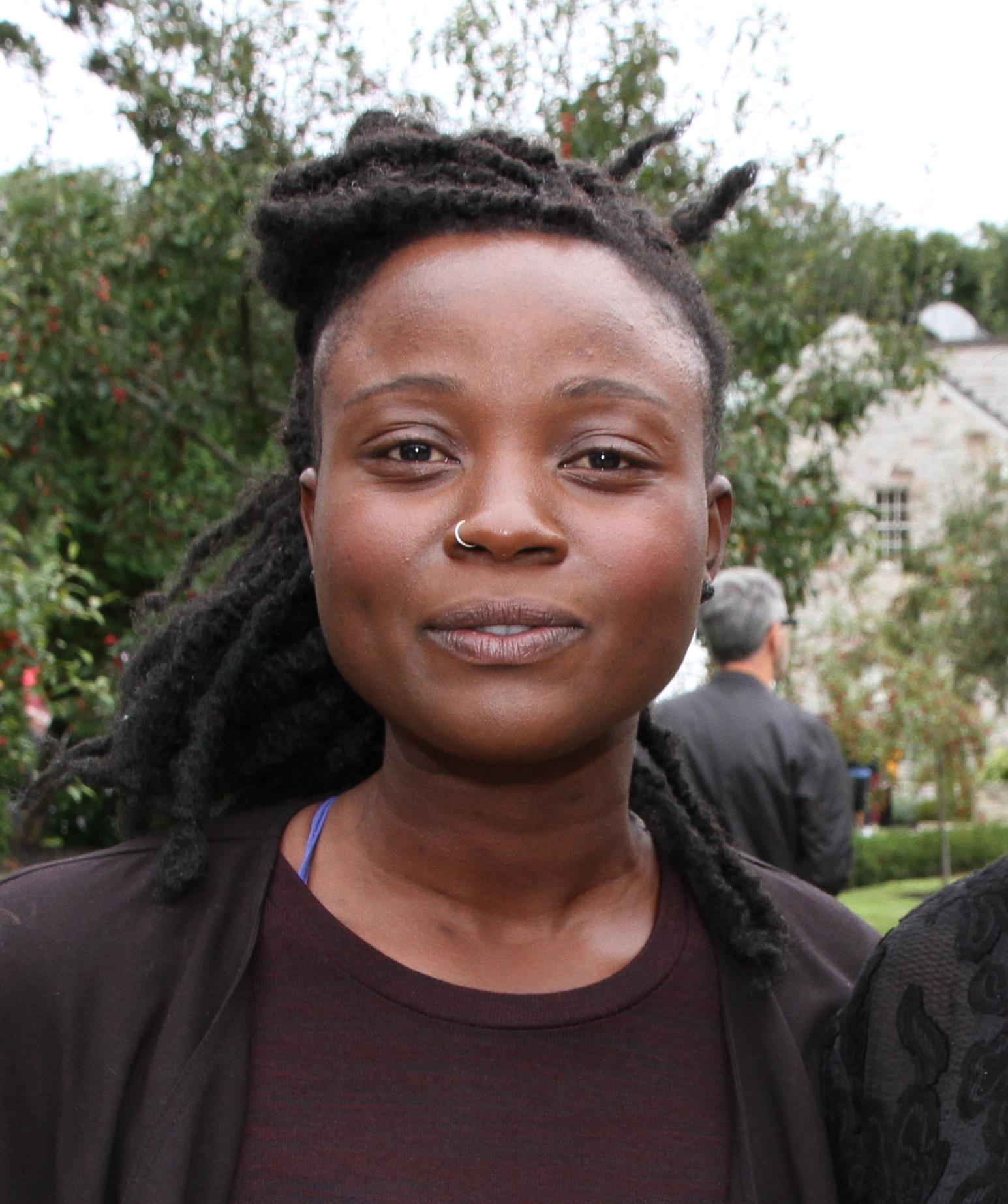
- Oladejo in 2015
- Born: c. 1985 (age 40–41); Ibadan, Nigeria
- Occupation: Actress
- Years active: 2013–present

Oyin Oladejo (born c. 1985) is a Nigerian actress, known for portraying Joann Owosekun on the television series Star Trek: Discovery.

== Life ==
Oladejo was born in Ibadan, Nigeria, and grew up in Lagos. She moved to Canada in 2001 at the age of 16. She originally planned to study law, rejected it, and got a job as a ticket seller for the Canadian Opera Company, where she discovered her interest in acting. She then completed a course of study in theatre arts at Humber College in Toronto, and the Soul Pepper Academy in Toronto. In addition to regular theater engagements in Toronto, she played a supporting role in a short film, but otherwise had no film offers; according to her own statement in an interview, she was about to give up the acting profession. Finally, she took on the advice of her agent with a self-made video of a casting part, without knowing what production it was for, and was shortly thereafter selected for the role of bridge officer Joann Owosekun on Star Trek: Discovery. Oladejo has since appeared in every season of the series.

In the following years, she was seen in the role of Ophelia in William Shakespeare's Hamlet, and in the male role of Lopakhin in Anton Chekhov's The Cherry Orchard.

She received a Canadian Screen Award nomination for Best Lead Performance in a Drama Film at the 12th Canadian Screen Awards in 2024, for the film Orah. She starred as Abiona Maina in the sci-fi children’s series Endlings and was aired on Hulu platform.

== Theater (selection) ==
- In This World Roseneath Theatre, Toronto 2013
- Happy Place, Soulpepper (Young Centre for the Performing Arts), Toronto 2015
- Marat/Sade, Soulpepper (Young Centre for the Performing Arts), Toronto 2015
- Noises Off, Soulpepper (Young Centre for the Performing Arts), Toronto 2016
- A Doll's House, Soul pepper (Young Centre for the Performing Arts), Toronto 2016
- TomorrowLove, Outside the March, Toronto 2016
- Hamlet, Shakespeare Theatre Company, Washington, D.C. 2018
- The Cherry Orchard, Crown's Theatre, Toronto 2019 (as Lopakhin)
- The Father (Florian Zeller), Coal Mine Theatre, Toronto 2019

== Filmography ==
- 2017: Pond (short film by Tochi Osuji)
- 2017–2024: Star Trek: Discovery (TV Series)
- 2020: Endlings (TV Series)
- 2021: Six Guns for Hire (Film)
- 2023: Orah
- 2024: Village Keeper

== Awards ==
- Edna Khubyar Acting Award (Humber College)
- Dora Mavor Moore Award for Outstanding Performance – Individual (for In This World)
