= Lonzo Nzekwe =

Nigerian filmmaker

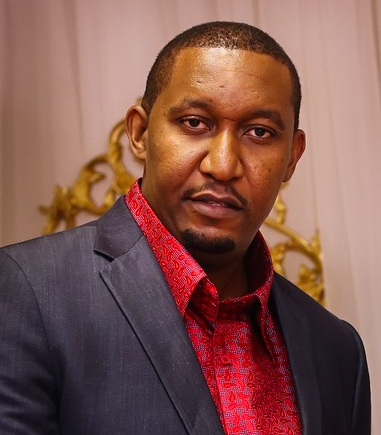
- Born: Lonzo Nzekwe; Nigeria
- Citizenship: Nigerian/Canadian
- Occupations: filmmaker; director; writer; producer
- Years active: 2010 - present
- Notable work: Anchor Baby (2010) Meet The Parents (2016) Orah (2023)
- Awards: Best Film at 2010 Harlem International Film Festival, Best Short Film at 2016 Africa Movie Academy Awards (AMAA)

Lonzo Nzekwe // is a Nigerian-Canadian filmmaker based in Toronto, Canada. He creates transnational Nigerian content, including Anchor Baby, his 2010 debut film which premiered at the 2010 Harlem International Film Festival and won the Best Film award. Anchor Baby was released on Netflix on May 20, 2020. His second film, Meet The Parents won the award for "Best Short Film" at the 2016 Africa Movies Academy Awards (AMAA).

Nzekwe is a self-taught filmmaker who writes, directs and produces most of his film projects. He co-founded the first black-owned 24-hour Canadian television network, FEVA TV, and served as the company's CEO from 2013 to 2015. He is also actively involved in the distribution of content as well as its creation through his film production/streaming company, Ironflix.

His second feature film, Orah, entered production in 2022, and is selected to screen for film buyers and industry professionals at the 2023 Toronto International Film Festival, in the Industry Selects program. The film will have its official public premiere at the 2023 Cinéfest Sudbury International Film Festival.

== Early life and education ==
Nzekwe left Nigeria in 1997, and currently lives in Ontario, Canada.

== See also ==
- List of Nigerian film producers
