= 28th Fantasia International Film Festival =

2024 edition of film festival

- Opening film: Bookworm
- Closing film: Ababooned (Ababouiné)
- Location: Montreal, Quebec, Canada
- Founded: 1996
- Festival date: 18 July to 4 August 2024
- Language: International
- Website: fantasiafest.com

Fantasia International Film Festival
- 29th 27th

The 28th Fantasia International Film Festival was held from 18 July to 4 August 2024 in Montreal, Quebec, Canada.

== Juries ==
=== Compétition Cheval Noir ===
- Matt Johnson, Canadian filmmaker – Jury President
- Steve Dollar, American film critic
- Rob Jabbaz, Canadian filmmaker
- Kristina Klebe, American actress and filmmaker
- Ariane Louis-Seize, French-Canadian filmmaker

=== New Flesh Competition for Best First Feature ===
- Rain Rannu, Estonian filmmaker – Jury President
- Sapna Moti Bhavnani, Indian filmmaker
- Éric S. Boisvert, Canadian filmmaker
- Amelia Moses, Canadian filmmaker

=== International Short Film Competition ===
- Heidi Honeycutt, American film critic – Jury President
- Jean Anne Lauer, American professor and festival programmer
- Emily Lerer, Canadian filmmaker
- Gary Pullin, American illustrator
- Alex Williams, American film acquisitions executive

=== Satoshi Kon Award for Excellence in Animation ===
- Johane Matte, Canadian story artist – Jury President
- Jonathan Alvarez, American film acquisitions executive
- Elizabeth E. Schuch, American filmmaker

=== DGC Audience Award for Best Canadian Film ===
- Philip Kalin-Hajdu, Canadian filmmaker – Jury President
- Caroline Labrèche, Canadian filmmaker
- Francesco Giannini, Canadian filmmaker
- Serena Whitney, Canadian film programmer and filmmaker
- Trevor Anderson, Canadian filmmaker

=== Poulain Noir ===
- Luca Jalbert, French-Canadian filmmaker – Jury President
- Livia Gilbert, French-Canadian comedian
- Vincent Feller, French-Canadian comedian

=== Jury AQCC – Camera Lucida ===
- Alexandre Fontaine Rousseau, French-Canadian film critic – Jury President
- Prune Paycha, French-Canadian film critic and photographer
- Guillaume Potvin, French-Canadian film critic

=== L'écran Fantastique Jury ===
- Yves Rivard, French-Canadian film critic

== Films ==
=== Selection 2024 ===
Title	Director(s)	Production country	Ref.
100 Yards	Haofeng Xu and Junfeng Xu	China	
The A-Frame	Calvin Reeder	United States	
Azrael	E. L. Katz	United States	
Baby Assassins Nice Days	Yugo Sakamoto	Japan	
The Beast Within	Alexander J. Farrell	United Kingdom	
Black Eyed Susan	Scooter McCrae	United States	
Brave Citizen	Park Jin-pyo	South Korea	
Brush of the God	Keizō Murase	Japan	
The Chapel	Carlota Pereda	Spain	
Cuckoo	Tilman Singer	Germany	
Dead Dead Full Dead	Pratul Gaikwad	India	
The Dead Thing	Elric Kane	United States	
Don't Call it Mystery	Hiroaki Matsuyama	Japan	
FAQ	Damin Kim	South Korea	
Fly Me to the Saitama: From Biwa Lake with Love	Hideki Takeuchi	Japan	
Hanu-Man	Prasanth Varma	India	
Haze	Matthew Fifer	United States	
Heavens: The Boy and His Robot	Rich Ho	Singapore	
Hell Hole	Toby Poser & John Adams	United States / Serbia	
House of Sayuri	Kōji Shiraishi	Japan	
The Killers	Kim Jong-kwan, Roh Deok, Chang Hang-jun, and Lee Myung-se	South Korea	
A Legend	Stanley Tong	China	
Meanwhile on Earth	Jérémy Clapin	France	
Not Friends	Atta Hemwadee	Thailand	
Oddity	Damian McCarthy	United Kingdom	
The Paragon	Michael Duignan	New Zealand	
Rats!	Maxwell Nalevansky and Carl Fry	United States	
The Roundup: Punishment	Heo Myeong Haeng	South Korea	
Shelby Oaks	Chris Stuckmann	United States	
The Soul Eater	Julien Maury and Alexandre Bustillo	France	
Swimming in a Sand Pool	Nobuhiro Yamashita	Japan	
Tatsumi	Hiroshi Shoji	Japan	
Teasing Master Takagi-san Movie	Rikiya Imaizumi	Japan	
The Tenants	Eunkyoung Yoon	South Korea	
This Man	Tomojiro Amano	Japan	
Timestalker	Alice Lowe	United Kingdom	
Twilight of the Warriors: Walled In	Soi Cheang	China	
Vulcanizadora	Joel Potrykus	United States	
Witchboard	Chuck Russell	Canada	
The Yin Yang Master Zero	Shimako Satō	Japan	

=== Compétition Cheval Noir ===
English title	Original title	Director(s)	Production country	Ref.
4PM	오후 네시	Jay Song	South Korea	
Ababooned	Ababouiné	André Forcier	Canada	
The Count of Monte Cristo	Le Comte de Monte-Cristo	Alexandre de la Patelière, Matthieu Delaporte	France	
Confession	告白 (Kokuhaku)	Nobuhiro Yamashita	Japan	
Electrophilia	Los Impactados	Lucía Puenzo	Argentina	
In Our Blood		Pedro Kos	United States	
Infinite Summer	Igavene suvi	Miguel Llansó	Estonia, Spain	
Mash Ville	매쉬빌	Hwang Wook	South Korea	
Out of the Shadow	臥底的退隱生活	Ricky Ko	Hong Kong	
Párvulos		Isaac Ezban	Mexico	
Penalty Loop	ペナルティループ	Shinji Araki	Japan	
Rita		Jayro Bustamante	Guatemala	
A Samurai in Time		Junichi Yasuda	Japan	
Steppenwolf		Adilkhan Yerzhanov	Kazakhstan	

=== New Flesh Competition ===
Title	Director(s)	Production country	Ref.
Brush of the God	Keizō Murase	Japan	
Chainsaws were Singing	Sander Maran	Estonia	
Dead Dead Full Dead	Pratul Gaikwad	India	
Heavens: The Boy and His Robot	Rich Ho	Singapore	
Hunting Daze (Jour de chasse)	Annick Blanc	Canada	
Kidnapping Inc.	Bruno Mourral	Canada / Haiti / France	
Kryptic	Kourtney Roy	Canada	
Me and My Victim	Maurane Dubois and Billy Pedlow	Canada	
Not Friends	Atta Hemwadee	Thailand	
The Paragon	Michael Duignan	New Zealand	
Rats!	Maxwell Nalevansky and Carl Fry	United States	
Self Driver	Michael Pierro	United States	
Shelby Oaks	Chris Stuckmann	United States	

=== Animation Plus ===
==== Feature films ====
English title	Original title	Director(s)	Production country	Ref.
Animalia Paradoxa		Niles Atallah	Chile	
Ghost Cat Anzu	化け猫あんずちゃん (Bakeneko Anzu-chan)	Yōko Kuno, Nobuhiro Yamashita	Japan	
KIZUMONOGATARI - Koyomi Vamp	傷物語 こよみヴァンプ	Tatsuya Oishi	Japan	
Mantra Warrior: The Legend of the Eight Moons	นักรบมนตรา: ตำนานแปดดวงจันทร์	Veerapatra Jinanavin	Thailand	
The Missing	Iti Mapukpukaw	Carl Joseph Papa	Philippines	
Mononoke the Movie: Phantom in the Rain	劇場版モノノ怪 唐傘 (Gekijōban Mononoke: Karakasa)	Kenji Nakamura	Japan	
Sunburnt Unicorn		Nick Johnson	Canada	
The Umbrella Fairy	伞少女	Jie Shen	China	

==== Short films ====
Title	Director(s)	Production country	Ref.
Amy and Frog	Paul Williams	United Kingdom, China	
Bottled Thunder	Leong Jo	China	
Bulusan and Agigngay: The Cry of Mampak	Gary George Clotario	Philippines	
The Exorcist, Kim Rina	Yeonhoo Kim, Sugyeon Shin, Sumin Lim	South Korea	
Game Show	Fei Chen	China	
I'm Not a Robot	Victoria Warmerdam	Belgium, Netherlands	
Lantern Blade Episode 1	Ziqi Zhu	China	
Lantern Blade Episode 2	Ziqi Zhu	China	
Lantern Blade Episode 3	Ziqi Zhu	China	
Macguffin	Jihye Yang	South Korea	
Maidens of the Ripples	Soma Michiko	Japan	
Mecha-Ude Episode 1	Sae Okamoto	Japan	

=== Documentaries From The Edge ===
English title	Original title	Director(s)	Production country	Ref.
Adrianne and the Castle		Shannon Walsh	Canada	
From My Cold Dead Hands		Javier Horcajada Fontecha	Spain	
VOÏVOD: We Are Connected		Felipe Belalcazar	Canada	

=== Fantasia Retro ===
The Fantasia Retro section honors feature works that shaped the history of genre filmmaking.

==== Feature films ====
English title	Original title	Director(s)	Production country	Ref.
The Avenging Eagle (1978)	冷血十三鷹 (Léngxuě Shísān Yīng)	Sun Chung	Hong Kong	
A Chinese Ghost Story II (1990)	倩女幽魂 II：人間道	Ching Siu-tung	Hong Kong	
Cockfighter (1974)		Monte Hellman	United States	
Cube (1997)		Vincenzo Natali	Canada	
Devil Times Five (1974)		Sean MacGregor	United States	
Hollywood 90028 (1973)		Christina Hornisher	United States	
Killer Constable (1980)	萬人斬 (Wàn Rén Zhǎn)	Chih-Hung Kwei	Hong Kong	
My Financial Career (1962)		Gerald Potterton	Canada	
Tiki Tiki (1971)		Gerald Potterton	Canada	

==== Short films ====
Title	Director(s)	Production country	Ref.
Jean Pierre Lefebvre (2013)	Simon Galiero	Quebec	
Hors-d'oeuvre (1960)	Gerald Potterton, Robert Verrall, Arthur Lipsett, Derek Lamb, Jeff Hale, Kaj Pindal	Canada	
My Financial Career (1962)	Gerald Potterton	Canada	

=== Genre Du Pays ===
English title	Original title	Director(s)	Production country	Ref.
The Carpenter (1988)		David Wellington	Canada	
Song for Julie (1976)	Chanson pour Julie	Jacques Vallée	Canada	
Snake Eater (1989)	L'Indomptable	George Erschbamer	Canada	
The Pig's Law (2001)	La Loi du cochon	Érik Canuel	Canada	
The Night with Hortense (1988)	Nuit avec Hortense, La	Jean Chabot	Canada	
Pigs Are Seldom Clean (1973)	On n'engraisse pas les cochons à l'eau claire	Jean Pierre Lefebvre	Canada	
The Rubber Gun (1977)		Allan Moyle	Canada	

=== Anime no bento 2024 ===
The Anime no bento program features highlights from new anime releases.

Title	Director(s)	Production country	Ref.
First Line	Tina	Japan	
Maidens of the Ripples	Soma Michiko	Japan	
The True Shape of a Daisy	Naoki Arata	Japan	
Kamigoroshi: Prologue	Tomoyuki Niho	Japan	
Okuninushi and Sukunabikona	Akitoshi Yokoyama	Japan	
String Dance from the film TAISU	Shuhei Morita	Japan	

=== Circo Animato 2024 ===
The Circo Animato section of the festival showcases new animated short films from around the world.

Title	Director(s)	Production country	Ref.
African American Express	Sydnie Baynes	Canada	
Anthropocene	Huang Yun-Sian, Raitow Low	Taiwan	
The Beasts	Michael Granberry	United States	
Extremely Short	Kōji Yamamura	United States, Japan	
Formes	Tsz-wing Ho	Hong Kong	
Haru-tsuge Fish and Fu-rai Boy	Takeshi Yashiro	Japan	
Itch	Maggie Zeng	Canada	
Mothership: The Awakening	Joseph Burrascano	United States	
A New Account of Tales of the World	Meiyi Che	China	
Number 32. Giant Fish	Seunghyun Si	South Korea	
Pantheon Bird	Eunyoung Choi, Asami Murakoshi	Japan	
The Parade	Ryan Benjamin Lee	United States, Singapore	
Trumpet Voice	David Monarte Serna, Pilar Smoje Gueico	Chile	
The Wedding Veil of the Proud Princes	Anna-Ester Volozh	United Kingdom	
Weiqi Fantasy	Yuanru Liu	China	
The Yearbook	Charlie Galea McClure	Canada	

=== Sepentrion Shadows ===
The Sepentrion Shadows program features works from the northern regions of Canada.

==== Feature films ====
Title	Director(s)	Production country	Ref.
Dark Match	Lowell Dean	Canada	
Darkest Miriam	Naomi Jaye	Canada	
Frankie Freako	Steven Kostanski	Canada	
The G	Karl R. Hearne	Canada	
Kryptic	Kourtney Roy	Canada	
Scared Shitless	Vivieno Caldinelli	Canada	
Self Driver	Michael Pierro	Canada	
The Silent Planet	Jeffrey St. Jules	Canada	
Sunburnt Unicorn	Nick Johnson	Canada	

==== Short films ====
Title	Director(s)	Production country	Ref.
Art Baby	Pony Nicole Herauf	Canada	
Bath Bomb	Colin G. Cooper	Canada	
Bladder Shy	Joel Goundry	Canada	
Can't Sleep	Liam O'Connor-Savaria	Canada	
Dealer	Alfio Foti	Canada	
Dirty Bad Wrong	Erica Orofino	Canada	
The Door	Alexander Seltzer	Canada	
For Rent	Michèle Kaye	Canada	
Hell Is a Teenage Girl	Stephen Sawchuk	Canada	
How To Stay Awake	Vanessa Magic	Canada	
My Son Went Quiet	Ian Bawa	Canada	
Ring Neck	Vasili Manikas	Canada	
The Second	Taylor Ramos and Tony Zhou	Canada	
The Shitty Ride	Cole Doran	Canada	
Shiva	Josh Saltzman	Canada	
Thank You	Summer Lynn Gillespie and Carlo Quicho	Canada	
What the Hell	Valerie Barnhart	Canada	
Wildmen of the Greater Toronto Area	Solmund MacPherson	Canada	
You Don't Read Enough	Noa Kozulin	Canada	
You Have Reached Your Destination	Ryan Couldrey	Canada	

=== Underground ===
The Underground program features works from international regions of the world.

Title	Director(s)	Production country	Ref.
Animalia Paradoxa	Niles Atallah	Chile	
Carnage for Christmas	Alice Maio Mackay	Australia	
Chainsaws Were Singing	Sander Maran	Estonia	
The Code	Eugene Kotlyarenko	United States	
Love & Pop	Hideaki Anno	Japan	
Me and My Victim	Maurane and Billy Pedlow	Canada	
The Old Man and the Demon Sword	Fábio Powers	Portugal	

== Awards ==
=== Special Prizes ===
- Prix Denis-Héroux Award — André Forcier
- Trailblazer Award — Vincenzo Natali
- Cheval Noir Award — Mike Flanagan

=== Cheval Noir competition ===
- Best Film — The Count of Monte Cristo — Alexandre de la Patelière, Matthieu Delaporte
  - Special Jury Mention — Electrophilia — Lucía Puenzo
- Best Director — Mash Ville — Hwang Wook
- Best Screenplay — Electrophilia — Lucía Puenzo, Lorena Ventimiglia
- Best Cinematography — Inti Briones, Rita (dir. Jayro Bustamante)
- Best Editing — Penalty Loop (dir. Shinji Araki)
- Best Motion Picture Score — Penalty Loop (dir. Shinji Araki)
- Outstanding Performance Award — Mariana di Girolamo, Electrophilia; Anna Starchenko, Steppenwolf; Berik Aitzhanov, Steppenwolf

=== New Flesh competition ===
- Best First Feature — Self Driver — Michael Pierro
- Special Jury Mentions — Chainsaws Were Singing — Sander Maran); Kidnapping Inc. — Bruno Mourral

=== International Short Film Competition ===
- Best Film — Empty Jars — Guillermo Ribbeck
- Best Director — Björn Schagerström, Headache
- Best Screenplay — Iván Maureira and Guillermo Ribbeck, Empty Jars (dir. Guillermo Ribbeck)
- Best Cinematography — Be Right Back (dirs. Gabe Ibañez and Lucas Paulino)
- Best Editing — Night Fishing (dir. Moon Byoung-gon)
- Best Score — Blitzmusik (dir. Martin Amiot)
- Outstanding Performance — Ana Burgos, Empty Jars; Amed Bozan, Jenny Gustavsson, and Torkel Petersson, Headache
- Special Jury Mention (Best Film) — The Streetlight — Sophia Parella

=== Satoshi Kon Award for Achievement in Animation ===
- Best Animated Feature — Mononoke the Movie: Phantom in the Rain — Kenji Nakamura
- Special Jury Mention (Best Animated Feature) — The Missing — Carl Joseph Papa
- Best Animated Short
  - Gold — Wild Animal — Tianyun Lyu
  - Silver – Itch — Maggie Zeng
  - Bronze — Trumpet Voice — David Monarte Serna. Pilar Smoje Gueico

=== Directors Guild of Canada Award for Best Director ===
- Best Director (Feature Film) — Naomi Jaye, Darkest Miriam
- Special Jury Mention — Karl R. Hearne, The G

=== Quebec Critics Choice Association Award ===
- Best Film – Me and My Victim — Maurane, Billy Pedlow
- Special Jury Mention – Vulcanizadora — Joel Potrykus

=== Poulain Noir - My First Fantasia Award ===
- Best Film
  - Gold – Eyes — Yoojae Choi, Hyokyoung Nam
  - Silver – Two One Two — Shira Avni
  - Bronze – The Girl with the Occupied Eyes — Andre Carrilho

=== L’Écran Fantastique Award ===
- The Beast Within — Alexander J. Farrell

=== Audience Awards ===
- Best International Feature
  - Gold: Bookworm — Ant Timpson
  - Silver: The Count of Monte Cristo — Alexandre de la Patelière, Matthieu Delaporte
  - Bronze: RATS! — Maxwell Nalevansky, Carl Fry
- Best International Short
  - Gold: Faces
  - Silver: Streetlight
  - Bronze: Les yeux d’Olga
- Best Asian Feature
  - Gold: A Samurai in Time — Junichi Yasuda
  - Silver: Twilight of the Warriors: Walled In — Soi Cheang
  - Bronze: Penalty Loop — Shinji Araki
- Best Asian Short
  - Gold: Memory
  - Silver: Wanna Die Wanna Kill
  - Bronze: Night Fishing
- Best Documentary Feature: Voïvod: We Are Connected — Felipe Belalcazar
- Best Animated Feature
  - Gold: Ghost Cat Anzu — Yōko Kuno, Nobuhiro Yamashita
  - Silver: The Missing — Carl Joseph Papa
  - Bronze: Mononoke the Movie: Phantom in the Rain — Kenji Nakamura
- Best Animated Short
  - Gold: Ruthless Blade
  - Silver: Lantern Blade, Episode Three
  - Bronze: Les Bêtes; Number 32. Giant Fish (tie)
- Best Canadian Feature
  - Gold: Self Driver — Michael Pierro
  - Silver: The Silent Planet — Jeffrey St. Jules
  - Bronze: Scared Shitless — Vivieno Caldinelli
- Best Canadian Short
  - Gold: The Shitty Ride — Cole Doran
  - Silver: Dirty Bad Wrong — Erica Orofino
  - Bronze: Bath Bomb — Colin G. Cooper
- Best Quebec Feature
  - Gold: Kidnapping Inc. — Bruno Mourral
  - Silver: Hunting Daze (Jour de chasse) — Annick Blanc
  - Bronze: Ababooned (Ababouiné) — André Forcier
- Best Quebec Short
  - Gold: The Image Seller
  - Silver: Mourir en silence
  - Bronze: Réinsertion; Bring Back Guillaume (tie)
