= Kryptic =

- Directed by: Kourtney Roy
- Written by: Paul Bromley
- Produced by: Josh Huculiak; Amber Ripley; Sophie Venner
- Starring: Chloe Pirrie; Jeff Gladstone; Jason Deline
- Cinematography: David Bird
- Edited by: Tommasso Gallone
- Music by: Cayne McKenzie
- Production companies: Garden Productions; Goodbye Productions; Z56film
- Release date: March 10, 2024 (SXSW)
- Running time: 96 minutes
- Country: Canada
- Language: English

Kryptic is a Canadian horror thriller film, directed by Kourtney Roy and released in 2024. The film stars Chloe Pirrie in a dual role as Barb Valentine, a cryptid hunter who has disappeared while hunting for the Sooka, a mysterious forest creature, and Kay, a woman who herself encounters the Sooka while searching for Barb, and abandons her life to embark on a new quest for meaning and identity after the encounter eliminates all her memories of who she used to be.

The cast also includes Jeff Gladstone, Jason Deline, Ali Rusu-Tahir, Kamantha Naidoo, Jenna Hill, Pam Kearns, Jane Stanton, Sara J. Southey, Jennifer Copping, Moses Wamukoya, Sarah Hayward, Patti Allan, Christina Lewall and Ardy Ramezani.

== Distribution ==
The film premiered at the 2024 SXSW festival, and had its Canadian premiere at the 28th Fantasia International Film Festival. It later screened in the Borsos Competition program at the 2024 Whistler Film Festival.

Following its premiere at SXSW, the film landed a number of distribution deals for European territories.

== Critical response ==
On the review aggregator website Rotten Tomatoes, 67% of 18 critics' reviews are positive.

Josh Korngut of Exclaim! rated the film 6 out of 10, writing that "Pirrie as Kay helps the film avoid stumbling under the pressure of its confusing plot. Her wide-eyed, hushed energy brings to mind Rebecca Hall in dark indies like Christine and Resurrection."

For the Austin Chronicle, Alejandra Martinez called the film a flawed but promising debut, writing that "Pirrie brings a roiling, internal force that keeps the movie’s momentum going, and keeps the audience on its toes." Mary Beth McAndrews of Dread Central wrote that "Kryptic becomes a road movie fairy tale about a woman searching for the truth but she doesn’t really know what that truth is, exactly."

== See also ==
- List of horror films of 2024
