= Mary Magdalene (2026 film) =

2026 drama film by Gessica Généus

- French: Marie Madeleine
- Directed by: Gessica Généus
- Written by: Gessica Généus
- Produced by: Jean-Marie Gigon; Gessica Généus
- Starring: Gessica Généus; Béonard Monteau; Melissa Mildort; Edouard Baptiste; Ginou Jules
- Cinematography: Nicolas Canniccioni
- Edited by: Martial Salomon
- Production companies: Ayizan Production; SaNoSi Productions; Stenola Productions; Bidibul; Metafilm
- Release date: 14 May 2026 (Cannes)
- Running time: 103 minutes
- Countries: Haiti; Belgium; Luxembourg; Canada
- Languages: French; Haitian Creole

Mary Magdalene (French: Marie Madeleine) is a 2026 drama film written, produced, directed and starring Gessica Généus. It follows Marie Madeleine, a prostitute in Jacmel who finds herself in love with a evangelical believer.

The film had its world premiere at the Cannes Premiere section of the 2026 Cannes Film Festival on 14 May, where it was nominated for the Queer Palm.

== Premise ==
In Jacmel, on Haiti’s southern coast, Marie Madeleine lives from prostitution.

== Cast ==
- Gessica Généus as Marie Madeleine
- Béonard Monteau as Joseph
- Melissa Mildort as Mélody
- Edouard Baptiste as Jacques
- Ginou Jules as Sexy
- Gaëlle Bien-Aimé as Natacha
- Luchue Mesidor as Kadou

== Production ==
It was produced by SaNoSi Productions (France), and co-produced by Ayizan Productions (Haiti), Stenola Productions (Belgium), Bidibul (Luxembourg) and Metafilm (Canada).

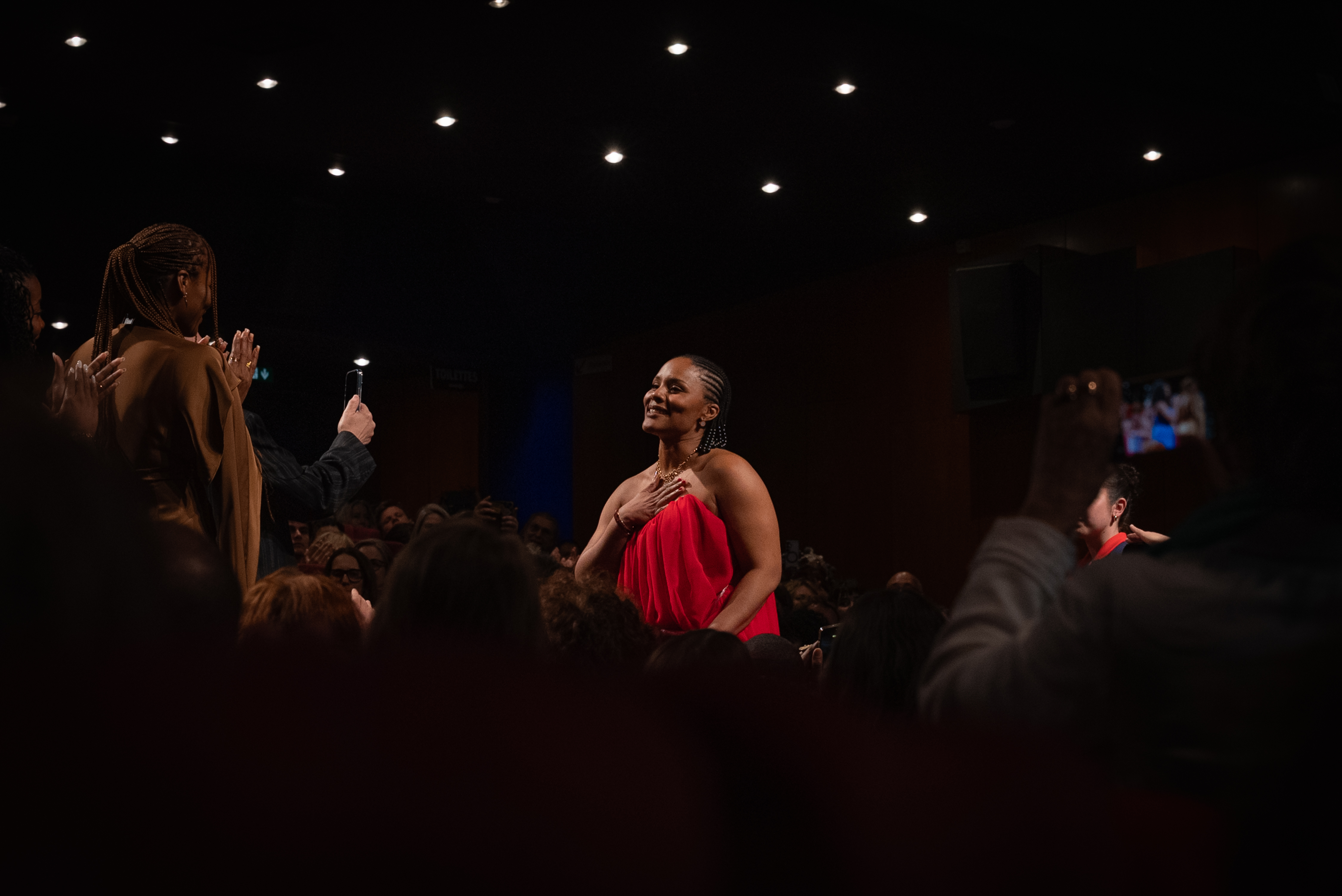
Généus during the world premiere at the 2026 Cannes Film Festival

== Release ==
The film had its world premiere at the Cannes Premiere section of the 2026 Cannes Film Festival on 14 May, where it was nominated for the Queer Palm.

It had its North American premiere in the Centrepiece program at the 2026 Toronto International Film Festival.

International sales are handled by Pyramide.

== Critical response ==
For That Shelf, Courtney Small wrote that "weaving the beautiful thread of culture, poetry, dance, sexuality, faith and more together in a mesmerizing fashion, Généus constructs an invigorating tapestry of emotion for the audience to behold. A confident work filled with wonderful performances by Généus and Monteau, Marie Madeleine is a captivating look at identity that ranks among the year’s best works."
