= Touched (2017 film) =

2017 film directed by Karl R. Hearne

- Directed by: Karl R. Hearne
- Written by: Karl R. Hearne
- Produced by: Karl R. Hearne
- Starring: Hugh Thompson; Lola Flanery
- Cinematography: Glauco Bermudez
- Edited by: Karl R. Hearne
- Music by: Olivier Alary
- Release date: September 15, 2017
- Running time: 78 minutes
- Country: Canada
- Language: English

Touched is a 2017 Canadian psychological thriller film, written, produced, edited, and directed by Karl R. Hearne.

The film stars Hugh Thompson as Gabriel, a man who works as a superintendent for an apartment building in Montreal. After one of his tenants goes missing, he finds a young girl (Lola Flanery) still living in her empty apartment. According to Hearne, part of the goal was to make a film "where the audience is not sure what kind of film they’re watching. Is this an abduction film? Is this a horror film? Is this an arthouse drama?"

The film debuted on the international film festival circuit in 2017, before making its Canadian theatrical debut in 2018.

The film was nominated for the John Dunning Best First Feature Award at the 7th Canadian Screen Awards in 2019.
