= The Rainbow Kid =

2015 film

- Film poster
- Directed by: Kire Paputts
- Written by: Kire Paputts
- Starring: Dylan Harman
- Cinematography: Maya Bankovic
- Production companies: Audiôs Amignes; Makeover Films; Whizbang Films; Train-Train Productions
- Distributed by: Phase 4 Films; Comedy Central Drama
- Release date: 1 June 2015
- Running time: 93 minutes
- Country: Canada
- Language: English

The Rainbow Kid is a 2015 Canadian drama film directed by Kire Paputts, telling the story of a traumatized adolescent runaway with Down syndrome in rural Northern Ontario. It was shown in the Discovery section of the 2015 Toronto International Film Festival.

The film, an expansion of Paputts' prior short film The Rainbow Connection, stars Dylan Harman as Eugene, a teenage boy with Down syndrome who sees a rainbow following a thunderstorm and, inspired by his favourite book, sets off on a journey to find the pot of gold at the end of it.

== Plot ==
Eugene's life as a young Torontonian man with Down Syndrome is very limited, and many of his peers are ableist and condescending to him. He goes to school by himself (to a special education room for disabled students), where he is bullied by other students and ignored by the girl he likes. He does yard work for neighbours to earn extra money, and spends the rest of his time at home with his terminally-ill mother. Eugene fantasizes about the whimsical story of a pot of gold at the end of a rainbow existing if only he can follow it, and he dreams of buying video games with the money. When he discovers that his mother will soon be evicted, Eugene runs away to rural Northern Ontario to attempt to track down some money to save the apartment. Unknown to him, his mother dies quickly after his departure.

Eugene meets a number of quirky characters along his journey through rural Ontario, an area with a high rate of unemployment. He lives briefly with an alcoholic dowser who steals Eugene's money, then a burnt-out transvestite former rockstar named Elvis (who now works as a handyman and fixes Eugene's bike while also teaching Eugene about sexual relationships). Elvis is abrasive and lewd and initially off-putting, but Eugene learns that the man is lonely and struggles with his gender identity as well as severe depression. Unable to reach his (dead) mother on Elvis's telephone, Eugene continues on his journey in the hopes of spotting a rainbow where he can find the legendary pot of gold on the other side. This leads him to befriend Anna, a cheerful girl with a sunny disposition; Anna also has Down syndrome and lives with her father, a hoarder with an affinity for photography and home videos. Eugene is invited to spend the night, in Anna's bed no less, which he finds strange. He becomes suspicious when he discovers a webcam hidden among the plushies and pillows directly parallel to Anna's bed, and Anna's casual approach to sex and nudity begins to worry him. Eugene deduces that Anna's father, who either adopted her illegally or keeps her away from her mother, is making child pornography and using Anna as an unwitting "model", having lied to her and told her that the webcam was a way for her absent "mother" to view her from afar. Eugene is disgusted by the abuse and flees with Anna into the forest after making her aware of the truth. Anna is terrified that her father will track them both down.

The next morning, Eugene and Anna come across a mass grave for wrecked cars in the forest. While playing in them, the brakes in one car fail, and the car strikes a tree, injuring them both. While Eugene is only mildly hurt, Anna gets a concussion and falls unconscious. Realizing that she needs medical help, Eugene ding-dong-ditches a nearby neighbour and leaves Anna at the doorstep, hoping that the neighbour will get Anna to a hospital. The film leaves Anna's fate ambiguous. Meanwhile Eugene stops to rest at the house of a charming and compassionate old lady who has an estranged adult son. The old lady harbours nostalgia for the past and adores her collection of sentimental trinkets, which she shares with Eugene. Eugene notices on the television set nearby an Alert Ready with his name and face on it, causing him to break down sobbing while the old lady comforts him. Suddenly, the house is broken into during a home invasion by burglars, who murder the old lady while failing to notice Eugene's presence at all. Angered by the old lady's death, Eugene goes after the burglars but they trap him into working for them instead, forcing him to grift on the street as a "retarded boy" begging for charity (money which the burglars will then take from him). Mounties finally intervene and realize that Eugene is innocent of the old lady's murder, but because his mother is dead and he has Down syndrome, Eugene falls through the cracks of the system as a mentally-disabled Canadian adult. He is placed in a group home rather than given gainful employment, but his life experience as a runaway on the street has hardened him into a quiet, brooding and bitter person. He fails to befriend other disabled adults and tells one of them, a known bully in the group home, to "fuck off" when he tries to steal a container of coveted lime Jell-O from a weaker peer. Eugene is shown to still believe in magic and miracles at the end of the rainbow, but he has since given up on the prospect of ever finding this himself.

== Cast ==
- Dylan Harman as Eugene
- Krystal Nausbaum as Anna
- Nicholas Campbell as Bill
- Julian Richings as Elvis Grimes
