= The Last Porno Show =

2019 Canadian drama film

- Film poster
- Directed by: Kire Paputts
- Written by: Kire Paputts
- Produced by: Ayah Hart; Kire Paputts
- Starring: Nathanael Chadwick; Amaan Morrell; James Murray; Frank D'Angelo; Victoria Dunsmore; Ellie Moon
- Cinematography: James Klopko
- Edited by: Michael Pierro
- Music by: Devon Goldberg
- Production company: Made By Other People
- Release date: September 10, 2019 (TIFF)
- Running time: 90 minutes
- Country: Canada
- Language: English

The Last Porno Show is a 2019 Canadian drama film, directed by Kire Paputts. The film stars Nathanael Chadwick as Wayne, a young aspiring actor who unexpectedly inherits an adult movie theatre in the Toronto neighbourhood of Leslieville after his father's death.

The film premiered at the 2019 Toronto International Film Festival.

Norman Wilner of Now gave the film a three-N rating, writing that "The Last Porno Show never really unifies its blend of tender drama, transgressive imagery and scabrous outsider comedy – Frank D'Angelo appears as Wayne’s Method acting coach, and he’s not bad! – but Paputts does find something meaningful in Wayne’s quest to overcome his traumatic childhood, folding a poignant sense of longing into all the dick shots."

The score was composed by Devon Goldberg and performed by Morricone Youth.

In 2020, it was reported that due to the sexually explicit aspects of the film, Paputts had experienced difficulty finding streaming platforms that were willing to carry it. The film is currently available only on the Vimeo on Demand platform.
