= Freda (film) =

2021 film

- International promotional poster
- Directed by: Gessica Généus
- Written by: Gessica Généus
- Produced by: Jean-Marie Gigon; Gessica Généus; Faissol Gnonlonfin
- Starring: Néhémie Bastien; Djanaïna François; Fabiola Rémy; Gaëlle Bien-Aimé; Cantave Kerven
- Cinematography: Karine Aulnette
- Edited by: Rodolphe Molla
- Production companies: Ayizan Production; Merveilles Production; SaNoSi Productions
- Distributed by: Nour Films (France)
- Release dates: 14 July 2021 (Cannes); 13 October 2021 (France)
- Running time: 93 minutes
- Countries: Haiti; Benin; France; Qatar
- Languages: French; Haitian Creole

Freda is a 2021 drama film written, produced and directed by Gessica Généus. Starring Néhémie Bastien as Freda, it follows her grappling between leaving Haiti for a better life with her boyfriend or remaining in the country to continue with her education and help support her family in Port-au-Prince.

The film had its world premiere at the Un Certain Regard section of the 2021 Cannes Film Festival on 14 July, where it was nominated for the Caméra d'Or. It was selected as the Haitian entry for the Best International Feature Film at the 94th Academy Awards, but was not nominated.

== Cast ==
- Néhémie Bastien as Freda
- Djanaïna François as Esther
- Fabiola Rémy as Jeannette
- Gaëlle Bien-Aimé as Géraldine
- Cantave Kerven as Moïse
- Juancito Jean as Yeshua
- Rolaphton Mercure as D-Fi

== Production ==
It was produced by Jean-Marie Gigon's SaNoSi Productions, Généus' Ayizan Production, and Faissol Gnonlonfin's Merveilles Production with the support of TV5Monde, Région Centre-Val de Loire (CICLIC), Hubert Bals Fund of International Film Festival Rotterdam, Aide aux Cinemas du Monde, Centre national du cinéma et de l'image animée (CNC), Institut Français, La Région Ile-de-France, Doha Film Institute, Fonds Images de la Francophonie, L'Ambassade de Suisse en République d'Haiti, and La Fondation Fokal.

After its premiere at Cannes Film Festival, Francis Ford Coppola joined the film's team as executive director.

Production took place during the Haitian crisis, between the pandemic lockdowns and the political and societal unrest in the country.

== Release ==
The film had its world premiere at the Un Certain Regard section of the 2021 Cannes Film Festival on 14 July, where it was nominated for the Caméra d'Or. It won the second place prize at the Pan-African Film and Television Festival.

International sales were handled by SaNoSi Productions.

It was theatrically released in France by Nour Films on 13 October 2021.

It was selected as the Haitian entry for the Best International Feature Film at the 94th Academy Awards, but was not nominated.

== See also ==
- List of submissions to the 94th Academy Awards for Best International Feature Film
- List of Haitian submissions for the Academy Award for Best International Feature Film
