= Chris Stuckmann =

American YouTuber and film critic (born 1988)

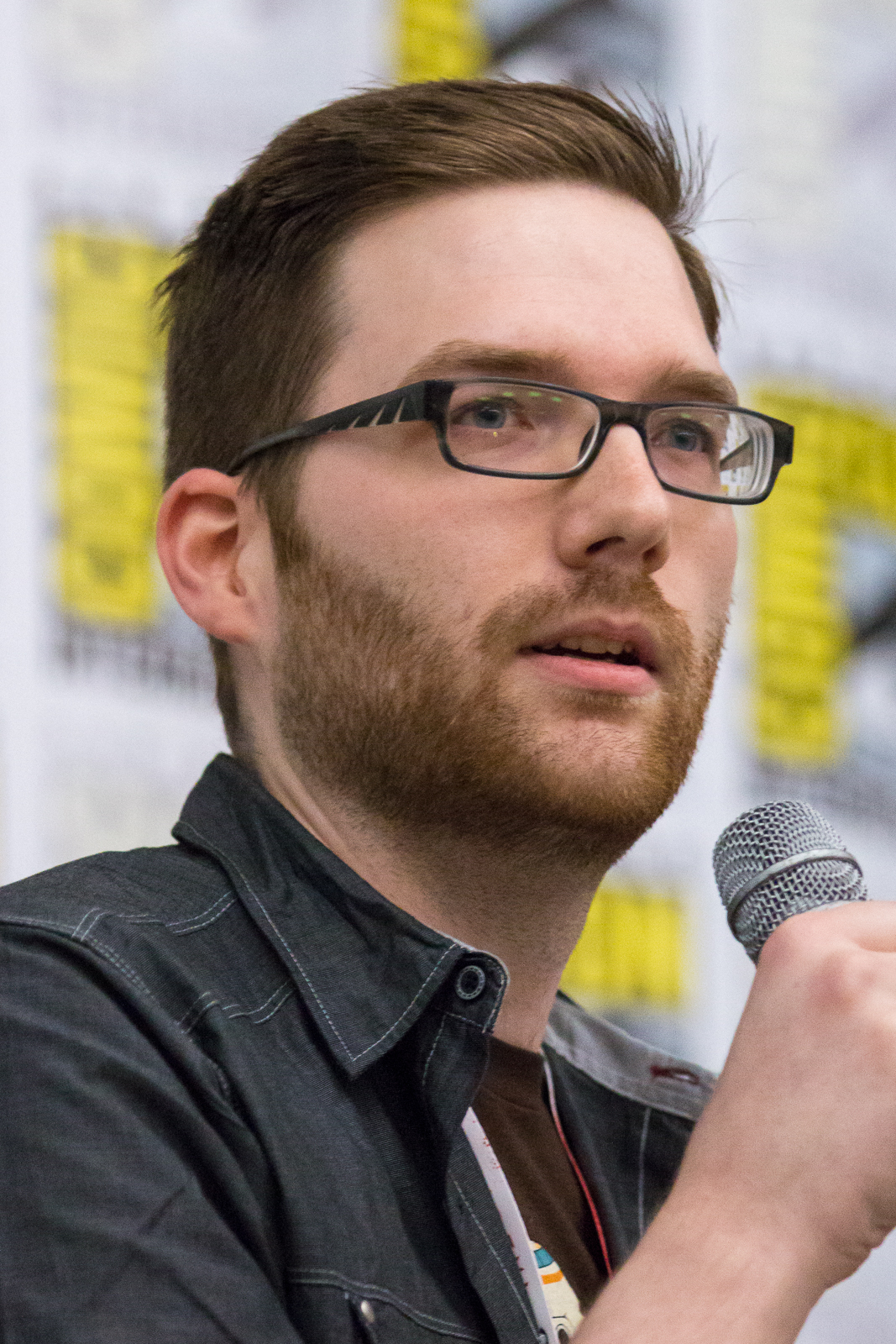
- Stuckmann at the 2015 San Diego Comic-Con
- Born: Christopher Michael Stuckmann; April 15, 1988 (age 38); Boston Heights, Ohio, U.S.
- Occupations: YouTuber; film critic; filmmaker; author
- Spouse: Sam Liz (m. 2014)
- Children: 2

YouTube information
- Channel: ChrisStuckmann
- Years active: 2009–present
- Genres: Film criticism; Filmmaking
- Subscribers: 2.02 million
- Views: 795.9 million
- Last updated: April 8, 2026

Christopher Michael Stuckmann (born April 15, 1988) is an American YouTuber, filmmaker, author, and film critic. Stuckmann has over 2 million subscribers and over 791 million views on the platform as of December 2025. On review aggregation website Rotten Tomatoes, he is an approved critic and a member of the Critics Choice Association. In mid-2021, it was announced that Stuckmann had signed to write and direct his full feature debut Shelby Oaks with Paper Street Pictures and producer Aaron B. Koontz.

== Early life ==
Stuckmann was born in Boston Heights, Ohio, growing up with two older sisters. Stuckmann is partly of German descent. He took an interest in film criticism from a young age, writing brief reviews of films as early as age fourteen. His primary inspiration among professional film critics was Roger Ebert, particularly the television-program Siskel & Ebert & the Movies which Ebert co-hosted with Gene Siskel. He writes that by watching these reviews, he "discovered the idea of a debate on a film, but a respectful one".

Stuckmann cites his experience watching Signs in theaters as a child as his primary inspiration for becoming a filmmaker. Filmmakers Stuckmann has cited as having heavily influenced him include George Lucas, Steven Spielberg, M. Night Shyamalan, and Christopher Nolan. Throughout high school, Stuckmann wrote and directed numerous homemade movies and short films with friends and family.

== Career ==
=== Beginnings and YouTube success ===
He began publishing YouTube reviews of current films in his twenties and published his first film review in 2009. His reviews initially began under a short-form series titled Quick Movie Reviews. When he started this series, there was only a small group of other video bloggers reviewing films on YouTube. He has also expanded into reviewing television shows, anime, and video games.

He published his first book, The Film Buff's Bucket List: The 50 Movies of the 2000s to See Before You Die, in 2016. A year later, he directed and wrote the short film Auditorium 6. In April 2018, Stuckmann published his second book titled Anime-Impact: The Movies and Shows that changed the World of Japanese Animation.

Stuckmann has become among the most popular film critics on the website, having a following of over 2.03 million subscribers as of December 2025. Stewart Fletcher of Moviepilot ranked Stuckmann's YouTube channel as the number one channel that movie fans should subscribe to, citing Stuckmann's passionate and coherently written reviews as the reason.

In a 2021 YouTube video titled "Moving Forward...", Stuckmann announced that he would be minimizing film reviews and would stop criticizing "bad" films. He would focus instead on analyzing, discussing, and guiding others on filmmaking. Stuckmann gave two reasons for this shift: first, he stated that he thought of himself as primarily a filmmaker, and wanted to shift focus to his film projects. Second, due to his popularity - which Stuckmann credits to being one of the first movie reviewers on YouTube in the early days of the platform - he was given the opportunity to be more involved in the production of films. He cited that seeing the effort and time that goes into the film production changed his perspective: "I no longer feel comfortable talking negatively about film. Meeting filmmakers, talking to them at festivals, going on to their sets, seeing how much work goes into even your average not-so-great movie; I just don't feel like doing that anymore. I don't want to talk negatively about filmmakers. I don't want to trash filmmakers. It would be strange for me to be making movies and also [trashing] filmmakers. Also, there's plenty of that on [YouTube] already."

=== Film projects ===
On July 6, 2021, it was announced that Stuckmann had recently signed with Gotham Group with multiple horror-scripts in the works. His full-length directorial debut, the horror-film Shelby Oaks, was planned to enter principal photography in late 2021 in Stuckmann's native Ohio. Stuckmann announced that filming was pushed back to 2022, due to insufficient funds and a potential strike between the International Alliance of Theatrical Stage Employees (IATSE) and the Alliance of Motion Picture and Television Producers (AMPTP). He also announced that they would be launching a Kickstarter fundraising project for the film so as to give him the creative leeway to better execute his vision.

The Kickstarter, which was launched in March 2022, quickly became the most-funded horror film on the site mere weeks after launch, while also surpassing the film's initial $250,000 goal. The final fundraising campaign ended on March 27, with $1,390,845 raised. In May 2024, Mike Flanagan, Trevor Macy, and Melinda Nishioka were revealed to be executive producers on the film, under their production company Intrepid Pictures. Shelby Oaks had its world premiere at the 28th Fantasia International Film Festival on July 20, 2024. In June 2024, Stuckmann signed with The Gersh Agency, for representation in film, including Shelby Oaks.

In July 2024, Neon acquired worldwide distribution rights to the film, later scheduling it for a theatrical release on October 24, 2025.

== Personal life ==
Stuckmann has been married to his wife Samantha Elizabeth since 2014. He is also a former Jehovah's Witness and in January 2021 he uploaded a video in which he detailed his negative experiences with the religion, and how he eventually left the faith in his early twenties to pursue filmmaking. In the same video, he also publicly came out as pansexual. On November 21, 2021, Stuckmann announced that Liz had given birth to twin boys on July 7, 2021.

== Filmography ==
=== Feature films ===
Year	Title	Director	Screenwriter	Producer	Film Editor	Notes
2003	Phenomenon Field	Yes	Yes	Yes	Yes	Home features
2005	The Woods	Yes	Yes	Yes	Yes	Home features
2024	Shelby Oaks	Yes	Yes	Yes	No	Directorial debut

=== Short films ===
Year	Title	Director	Screenwriter	Producer	Film Editor
2013	Julia	Yes	Yes	Yes	Yes
2017	Auditorium 6	Yes	Yes	Yes	Yes
2019	Notes from Melanie	Yes	Yes	Yes	Yes
TBA	Penance	Yes	Yes	Yes	Yes

=== YouTube ===
Year	Title	Role	Notes
2011–present	Chris Stuckmann's Movie Reviews	Presenter	Main role
2013–2020	Chris Stuckmann's Hilariocity Reviews	Presenter	Main role
2013	Stuckmann's 1st Annual Halloween Special	Co-presenter	Also director
2014	Movie Trivia Schmoedown	Participant	Three episodes
2014	Awesome Halloween Guilty Pleasures	Co-presenter	Also known as Stuckmann's 2nd Annual Halloween Special
2015	Nostalgia Critic	Guest	Three episodes
2015	Screen Junkies Movie Fights	Co-presenter	Seven episodes
2015	Scary Movie Binge!	Co-presenter	Also known as Stuckmann's 3rd Annual Halloween Special
2016	AMC Jedi Council	Guest	Episode: "Will There Be An Episode 8 Trailer Before Rogue One?"
2016	Stuckmann's 4th Annual Halloween Special	Co-presenter	Also director
2017	Anime Abandon	Guest	Episode: "Kite The Movie"
2017	I Hate Everything: The Search for the Worst	Guest	Episode: "The (NOT DREAMWORKS) Collection – 9 Movies!"
2017	Midnight Screenings	Guest	Episode: "A Christmas Story Live!"
2018	Sardonicast	Guest	Two episodes

== Bibliography ==
- The Film Buff's Bucket List: The 50 Movies of the 2000s to See Before You Die (2016)
- Anime Impact: The Movies and Shows That Changed the World of Japanese Animation (2018)
