= Ayiti Mon Amour =

2016 film

- Film poster
- Directed by: Guetty Felin
- Written by: Guetty Felin
- Produced by: Guetty Felin; Hervé Cohen; Jessica Anthony
- Starring: Joakim Cohen; Anisia Uzeyman
- Cinematography: Hervé Cohen
- Edited by: Stephane Vernet Augustin, Isabelle Devinck
- Music by: Leyla McCalla
- Distributed by: Europe: Orange Studio
- Release dates: 10 September 2016 (TIFF); 15 September 2017 (Haiti)
- Running time: 88 minutes
- Country: Haiti
- Languages: Creole; French; English; Japanese

Ayiti Mon Amour is a 2016 Haitian drama film directed by Guetty Felin. It was screened in the Contemporary World Cinema section at the 2016 Toronto International Film Festival. It was selected as the Haitian entry for the Best Foreign Language Film at the 90th Academy Awards, but it was not nominated. It was the first time Haiti had sent a film for consideration for the Best Foreign Language film.

== Plot ==
A tale of magical realism unfolds in Haiti, five years after a cataclysmic earthquake. A teenager discovers he has a superpower, an old fisherman seeks a cure at sea for his sick wife, and a character tries to escape a story penned by her author.

== Cast ==
- Joakim Cohen
- Anisia Uzeyman
- Jaures Andris

== Production ==
Much of the cast and crew were drawn from Felin's family and local community: her husband, Hervé Cohen, served as cinematographer; her oldest son Yeelen acted as her assistant (and his girlfriend performed second camera duties); and her youngest son Joakim made his debut appearance in the film's starring role. Felin sought to use natural light as much as possible, filming during the optimum hours of the day and harnessing the sun through reflectors, mirrors, and diffusers.

The film was the first narrative feature shot entirely in Haiti by a Haitian woman director. Felin's development of the film took place in the aftermath of the 2010 Haiti earthquake; intended to be a film about "lost souls" more than a film about grief and loss, Ayiti Mon Amour drew from Haitian Vodou beliefs.

The film was born out of grief and mourning. I wrote the first treatment on the heels of the devastating earthquake. At the same time I did not want it to be just about grief and loss. I think it is more about lost souls, alive and dead who are looking for the meaning of life and home.

The sea is a main character in the film because it represents the cycle of life. It also represents the original birthplace of mankind; that is if you believe that we are descendants of water mammals. There’s a Voudou belief that when a person dies their soul goes underwater and stay there for a year and a day. The family must perform a ritual that will help the soul to return on land. I often wondered about the souls that never made it to land, the ones that got trapped, so I wanted to create a sort of ritual through the film that allowed them to come home at least symbolically.

— Guetty Felin

== Reception ==
After a respectable showing at the Toronto International Film Festival, Ayiti Mon Amour was chosen as Haiti's selection for the Academy Awards and subsequently booked at other international film festivals. It was entered into competition at the 57th Cartagena International Film Festival in 2017. It was also among the films shown at the 24th New York African Film Festival in 2017 and the 11th Angoulême Francophone Film Festival in 2018.

Annette Ejiofor, writing for NBC News, called the film "a remembrance piece, a love story between a home, its land, and its people – young and old."

== See also ==
- List of submissions to the 90th Academy Awards for Best Foreign Language Film
- List of Haitian submissions for the Academy Award for Best Foreign Language Film
