= Gessica Généus =

Haitian actor, singer, documentary maker, film director, screen writer and author

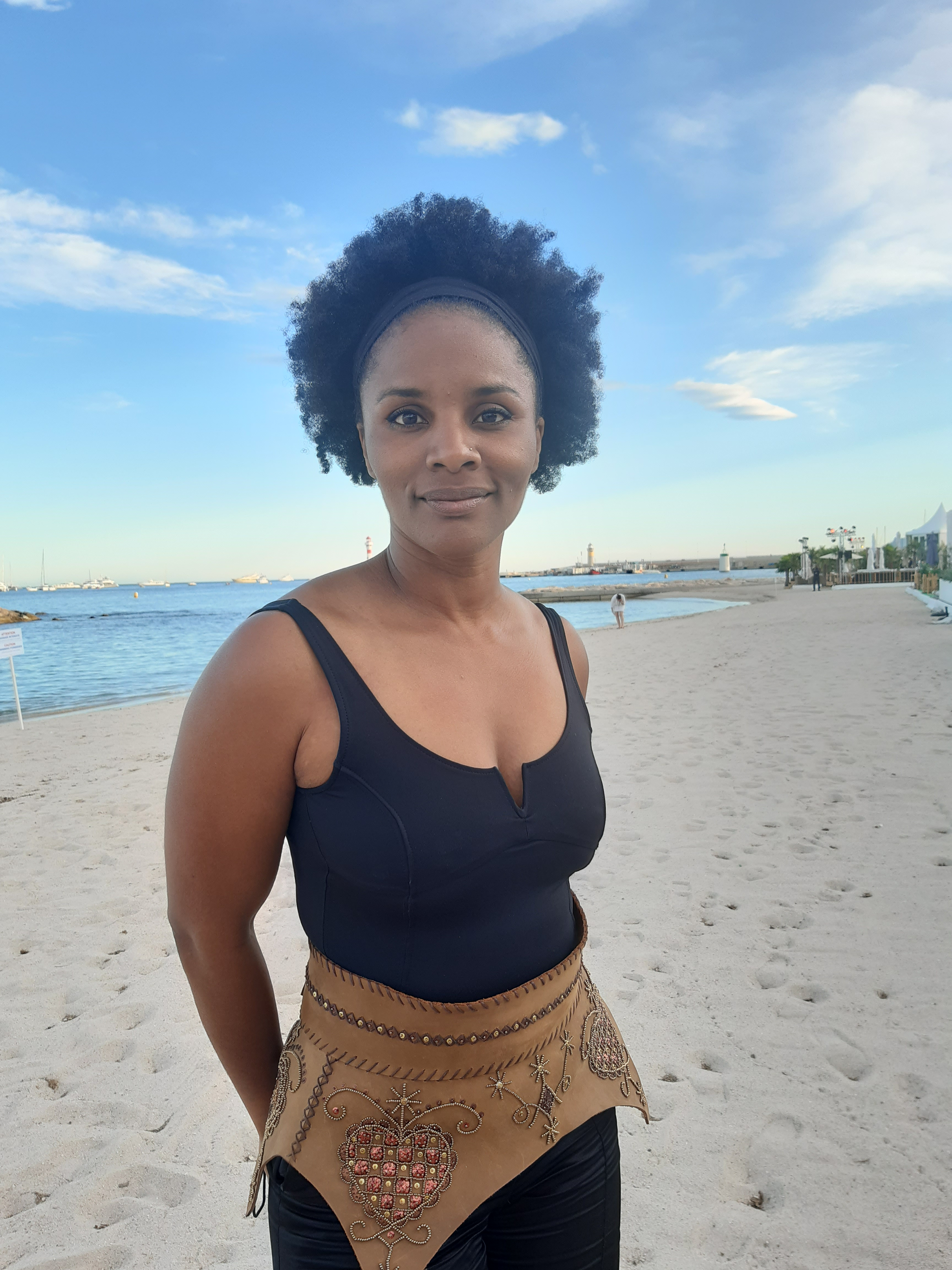
- Généus during the 2021 Cannes Film Festival
- Born: 23 December 1985 (age 40); Port-au-Prince, Haiti
- Occupations: Director; Actress
- Years active: 2002–present

Gessica Généus (born 23 December 1985) is a Haitian filmmaker, actress, singer and author. Most known for her drama film Freda (2021).

== Early life ==
Généus was born on 23 December 1985 in Port-au-Prince, the capital of Haiti, in a precarious neighbourhood, during the final months of dictatorial regime of Baby Doc Duvalier. Although she knew who her father was, he was not involved with her upbringing. She grew up with her mother and cousins. Her mother, an activist, was diagnosed as bi-polar and schizophrenic when Généus was fourteen. Généus is listed among the famous alumni of the College Saint-Louis de Bourdon.

== Career ==
=== Acting ===
In 2002, at the age of 17, Généus financially supported her final years at school by acting in Barikad (Barricade) a popular film directed by Richard Sénécal. For her role, she received the Ticket d'Or (Golden Ticket) for best actress at the Haitian Entertainment Awards. In 2006, she won the best female actress award at the Brooklyn International Film Festival in New York for her role in Cousine. (Cousin). In 2007, she won the Grand Prix de la Diaspora at FESPACO (Pan-African Cinema Festival of Ouagadougou).

After the earthquake in 2010, Généus worked for the United Nations before moving to Paris in 2011, on a scholarship to study acting from Acting International in Paris. In 2012, she played Vertueuse in a historical, French TV mini-series broadcast in two parts and titled Toussaint Louverture. It was produced by France 2.

=== Writing and music ===
In 2014, Généus published her first book: Yon ti koze ak se m (Conversations with my sister).

In March 2018, she released her first music album ASE.

=== Filmmaking career ===
After moving back to Haiti from Paris, Généus set up her own production company called Azizian Productions. From 2014-2016, she directed Vizaj Nou (Our faces), a series of fifteen-minute films, made in collaboration with Caribbean Television. They focused on leading figures in Haiti such as Viviane Gauthier, Frankétienne, Konpè Filo, and Odette Roy Fombrun.

In 2019, Généus made Douvan Jou Ka Leve (The Sun Will Rise) in collaboration with France TV. The film, about religion and mental health issues, won several awards.

In 2021, Généus made her feature film debut with Freda, which had its world premiere at the Un Certain Regard section of the 2021 Cannes Film Festival on 14 July. It was the first Haitian film to be screened at the Cannes Film Festival since 1993. Set in Port-au-Prince, it follows a single mother and her three children. Produced during the Haitian crisis, between the pandemic lockdowns and the political and societal unrest in the country. Francis Ford Coppola supported the film project by acting as executive producer. It won the second place prize at the Pan-African Film and Television Festival. It is also the second Haitian submission in history to be entered for the Academy Award for Best International Feature Film, at the 94th Academy Awards.

Her second feature film, Mary Magdalene, had its world premiere at the Cannes Premiere section of the 2026 Cannes Film Festival.

== Filmography ==
=== Feature films ===
Year	English Title	Original Title
2021	Freda	
2026	Mary Magdalene	Marie Madeleine

=== Documentaries ===
2017: The Sun Will Rise (Douvan Jou Ka Leve)

=== Short films ===
2012: Our Faces (Vizaj Nou)

=== Only actress ===
Year	English Title	Original Title
2002	Barricade	Barikad
2006	Cousin	Cousine
2006	Does the President have AIDS?	Le Président a-t-il le Sida?
2009	The Loves of a Zombie	Les amours d’un zombi
2012	Toussaint Louverture	
2016	The Empty Box	
2016	Everything But a Man	
2017	Cargo	
2024	Kidnapping Inc.	
