= Greenwood Farm (Richmond Heights, Ohio) =

Farm in Richmond Heights, Ohio

Coordinates: 41°34′23″N 81°29′45″W

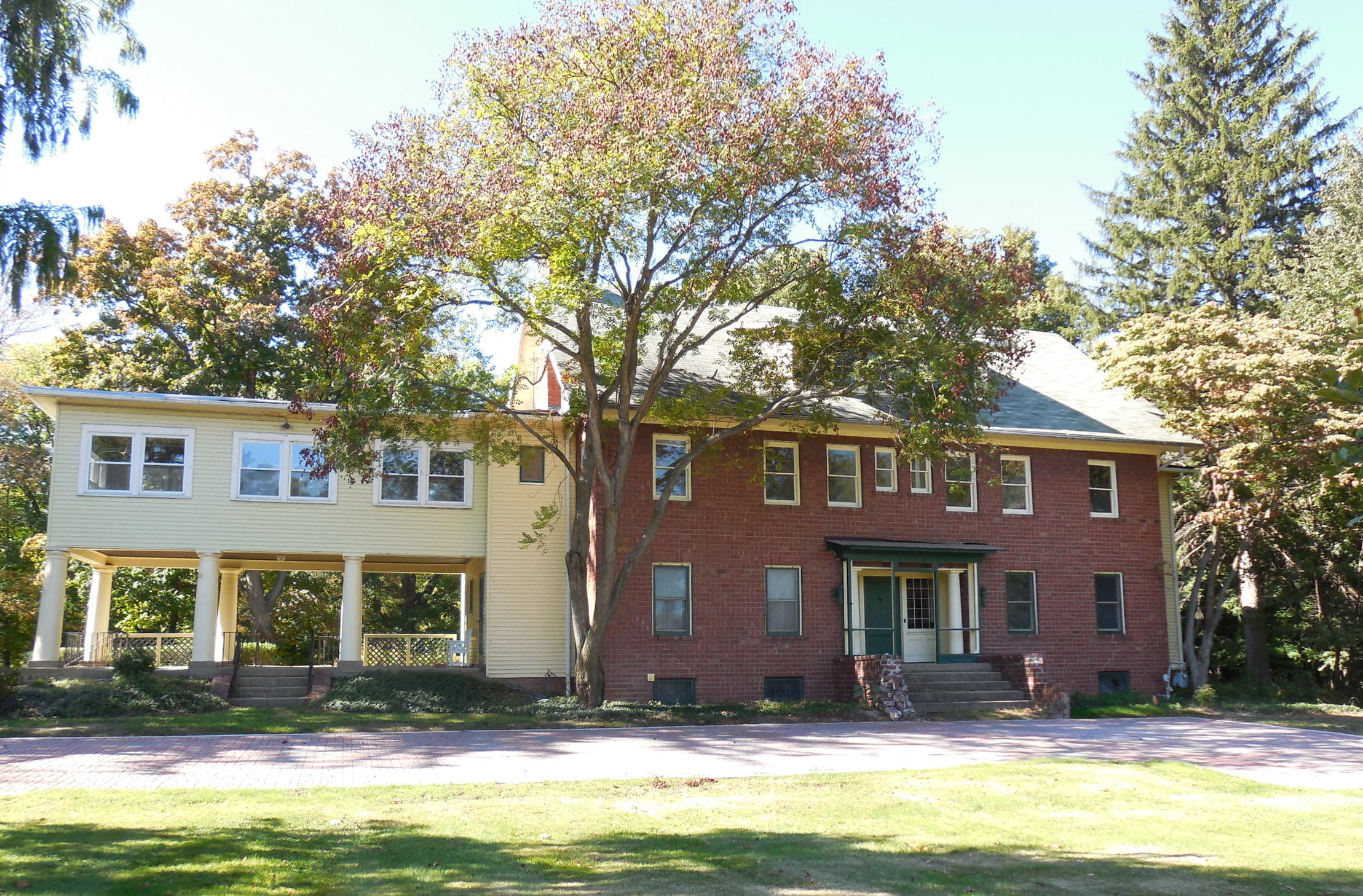
The main house at the farm

Greenwood Farm is a historic farm property at 264 Richmond Road in Richmond Heights, Ohio. It was the family estate of Maude and George W. Phypers. It is composed of 17 acres (6.9 ha) of green trees, open grass, a barn, and a three-story brick house built in 1917. A creek runs through the property, from which deer and raccoon frequently emerge. The city of Richmond Heights now owns the farm. It was listed on the National Register of Historic Places in 2016.

Maude Phypers' maternal grandfather was Thomas Smith Greenwood. Greenwood Farm is named after Maude's childhood home Greenwood Farm (Ipswich, Massachusetts) which consists of 100 acres (40 ha) and two houses. The 'new' house was built c. 1828 and the 'old' Paine House (c. 1694). The Trustees of Reservations now maintains Greenwood Farm (Ipswich).

George William Phypers was significant in local history, not only for his land holdings at Greenwood Farm, but also for his civic work and for his prominence in the development of Cleveland's insurance infrastructure.

George's father, George Sutcliffe Phypers, was born at St. Ives, Huntingdonshire, England. In 1850, when he was one year old, George S. Phypers came to America with his parents, John Phypers and Elizabeth Sutcliffe. As an adult, George S. Phypers worked in Cleveland as foreman at the White Sewing Machine Company.

George William Phypers was born on 8 April 1873, the first of his parents' five children. He attended school in the City of Cleveland until the age of fourteen, when he took a job as a messenger boy for the Lake Shore Railroad. His first involvement in the insurance business occurred in 1893, when he joined Olmstead Thomas and Company. After several years, he attended Western Reserve University for a short period, while working part-time. In September 1900, George W. married, Maude Pauline Maynard from Ipswich, Massachusetts.

Maude Pauline Maynard was the daughter of New England naturalist Charles Johnson Maynard and Pauline Thurlow Greenwood (later Pauline T. Farley). Maude's maternal ancestors had come to Massachusetts from England, in the first half of the 17th century. Maude attended the Boston Latin School and was later a school teacher. Maude met George through George's business contacts with her stepfather, Thomas Swasey Farley, who was also in the insurance business in Cleveland.

After their marriage, George and Maude lived in a home on Stanwood Road in East Cleveland. George's connection to East Cleveland would continue long after he moved the family "up the hill" to Greenwood Farm. George was one of the three men who formed the East Cleveland Baptist Church, which continues today as an anchor within the Baptist community.

In 1908, George and Maude purchased the Schmidt property in what was then defined as the Township of Euclid. George and Maude named their homestead "Greenwood Farm", in memory of Maude's maternal grandfather, Thomas Smith Greenwood, and the large farm he had owned in Ipswich, Massachusetts.

Maude and George transformed Greenwood Farm into a self-sufficient home, making use of the land and barn for growing crops. The Ohio Agricultural Extension Service in 1912, recommended a design that would provide the best yields and proper drainage for the farm.

For many years the farm had a variety of livestock, including cows, chickens and Tamworth boars. George loaned the boars out for a $2.00 stud fee or a choice of the resulting litter.

In 1909, George's desire to own his own insurance company became a reality: He and his brother Charles formed the Phypers Brothers Company. By 1910 the company was the fifth largest and was mentioned in a volume on the History of Cleveland. Charles later left the Phypers company, and George joined his company with that of Mr. Harold Neale. Today that company is still in existence in Independence, Ohio, and is known as the Neale-Phypers Corporation. Over the years, George would become well known in the insurance industry. He served as president of the Insurance Board of Cleveland (1947–48).

In 1925, George was elected to the Council of the Village of Richmond Heights. He served for thirty-two years, including several terms as Council President. As a leader, he guided Council into a contract for the Cleveland Electric Illuminating Company, to provide the community with electricity. Prior to that, George had run power lines from his Greenwood Farm dynamo to the local one-room school house located on Chardon Road, across the creek from the farm.

George and Maude had six children spanning 12 years: June, Paul, Fordham, Thurlow, Marian, and Ruth.

June became a second mother to the younger children, but this was not enough for such a large family and so, from time to time, domestic workers were hired. A room on the third floor was used for live-in help when needed.

The rest of the third floor was a single large room — a perfect play area. Here the youngsters practiced fencing, staged their own theatrical performances (complete with sliding curtains), and played billiards.

Education was stressed in the Phypers family, and play was not allowed to diminish the discipline and importance of the children's schoolwork. In addition, each child was expected to perform chores at Greenwood farm. At times the children, under Maud's direction, would set up a vegetable stand at the roadside of rural Richmond Road.

In 2015, The Bye Bye Man, a horror movie, was filmed at the farm. This was followed by Little Evil, a horror-comedy also released in 2017, and All the Bright Places, a drama, which came out in 2020. Also in Shelby Oaks (2024).
