= Kire Paputts =

Canadian film director and screenwriter

Kire Paputts is a Canadian film director and screenwriter. He is most noted for his feature films The Rainbow Kid, which premiered at the 2015 Toronto International Film Festival, and The Last Porno Show, which premiered at the 2019 Toronto International Film Festival.

He previously directed the short films Animal Control and Rainbow Connection, and the documentary films Only I Know, Paul the Dowser: Opening a Portal to the 5th Dimension, Coxwell & Gerrard and Gerrard Street East. He was also co-director with Colin Brunton of The Last Pogo Jumps Again, the 2013 feature expansion of Brunton's 1978 short film The Last Pogo, and producer of Michael Pierro's 2024 film Self Driver.

He is a graduate of the film studies program at Ryerson University.
