= Self Driver =

- Directed by: Michael Pierro
- Written by: Michael Pierro
- Produced by: Kire Paputts; Michael Pierro
- Starring: Nathanael Chadwick
- Cinematography: Michael Pierro
- Edited by: Michael Pierro
- Music by: Antonio Naranjo
- Production companies: Made by Other People; Summo Duo
- Release date: April 18, 2024 (Fantaspoa)
- Running time: 90 minutes
- Country: Canada
- Language: English

Self Driver is a Canadian thriller film, directed by Michael Pierro and released in 2024. Pierro's directorial debut, the film stars Nathanael Chadwick as a driver for a ridesharing app, who is invited to join a new startup competitor that promises much, much more money but draws him into grave danger with its increasingly extreme demands.

The cast also includes Reece Presley, Lauren Welchner, Catt Filippov, Christian Aldo, Harold Tausch, Melanie Lachman and Melissa Melottey in supporting roles.

The film premiered at the 2024 Fantaspoa International Fantastic Film Festival. It had its North American premiere at the 28th Fantasia International Film Festival, where it won the award for Best First Feature in the New Flesh competition and the Audience Award for Best Canadian Feature.

== Critical response ==
Nikki Baughan of Screen Daily positively reviewed the film, writing that "The everyday horrors of the modern gig economy prove fertile ground for Self Driver, the debut feature from Canadian writer/director Michael Pierro which effectively explores the toxic relationship between desperation and exploitation. Despite the practical limitations of its ultra-low budget, this story of a Toronto taxi driver whose need to earn a living leads him down a dark path makes the most of its simple premise, and serves as a strong calling card for both its maker and lead actor Nathanael Chadwick."
