= Yanick Létourneau =

Canadian film producer

Yanick Létourneau is a Canadian film producer, who is the co-founder and head of Peripheria Productions. He is most noted as a producer of the documentary film Gulîstan, Land of Roses, which was a Canadian Screen Award nominee for Best Feature Length Documentary at the 5th Canadian Screen Awards in 2017, and the narrative feature film Night of the Kings (Le Nuit des rois), which was a CSA nominee for Best Picture at the 10th Canadian Screen Awards in 2022.

His other credits have included the films X500, Dancing the Twist in Bamako and Kidnapping Inc..
