= Mantra Warrior: The Legend of the Eight Moons =

2023 Thai animation film based on the Ramayana

- Directed by: Veerapatra Jinanavin
- Screenplay by: Sornperes Subsermsri
- Story by: Chaichan Artwichai
- Based on: Ramakien
- Produced by: Juthathip Niramonpisan; Agung Bagus; Sornperes Subsermsri; Ruechid Kanjanapitak; Eddy Vorachart; Sanpech Satrawaha
- Starring: Ranee Campen; Tachaya Prathumwan; Manop Srijupao; Apinan Teeranantakul; Rainnie R Grada; Noppawan Haembutra; Juthathip Niramonpisan
- Cinematography: Vorrarit
- Edited by: Visit Ontanalai
- Music by: Agung Bagus; Vichaya Vatanaspt
- Production company: RiFF Animation Studio
- Distributed by: GDH 559
- Release date: 11 October 2023
- Running time: 1 hour 30 minutes
- Country: Thailand
- Language: Thai

Mantra Warrior: The Legend of the Eight Moons (Thai: นักรบมนตรา: ตำนานแปดดวงจันทร์) is a 2023 Thai animation film based on the Thai national Epic Ramakien (which is in turn based on Ramayana). The film was produced by RiFF Animation Studio, directed by Veerapatra Jinanavin, written by Sornperes Subsermsri and stars Ranee Campen as the voice of Sita. It was released in theaters on October 11, 2023.

== Release ==
The film was screened at the 28th Fantasia International Film Festival on July 21, 2024.
