= The G (film) =

2023 Canadian thriller film

- Film poster
- Directed by: Karl R. Hearne
- Screenplay by: Karl R. Hearne
- Produced by: Karl R. Hearne; José Lacelle
- Starring: Dale Dickey
- Cinematography: Vlad Horodinca
- Edited by: Arthur Tarnowski
- Music by: Philippe Brault
- Production company: 3Buck Productions
- Distributed by: levelFILM (Canada)
- Release dates: November 11, 2023 (Tallinn); November 29, 2024
- Running time: 100 minutes
- Country: Canada
- Language: English

The G is a 2023 Canadian crime thriller film written, directed, and produced by Karl R. Hearne, and starring Dale Dickey as a grandmother seeking revenge. It premiered at the Tallinn Black Nights Film Festival on November 11, 2023. The UK premiere took place at the 2024 Glasgow Film Festival. The G had its North American premiere at the 2024 Fantasia Film Festival, where Karl R. Hearne won a Special Jury Prize for Best Director.

== Premise ==
After a corrupt legal guardian puts Ann, a grandmother, in a care home in order to take her property, Ann looks for vengeance with the help of her granddaughter Emma, who calls her "The G". The film is set on the industrial edges of an unnamed city.

== Cast ==
- Dale Dickey as Ann Hunter
- Romane Denis as Emma
- Roc Lafortune as Joseph
- Bruce Ramsay as Rivera
- Jonathan Koensgen as Ralph

== Production ==
Hearne, who directed and produced the film, as well as writing it, said the main character Ann was inspired by his own grandmother, "a woman who regardless of her age or situation- refuses to accept that her life is over". The film is also based on well-documented real-world scams that prey on the elderly. The film is produced by 3Buck Productions, whilst levelFILM has acquired all rights for Canadian distribution.

== Release ==
The film premiered at the Tallinn Black Nights Film Festival on November 11, 2023. The UK premiere took place at the 2024 Glasgow Film Festival, and the film was released in theatres in the UK/Ireland on June 21, 2024. The G also premiered at the 2024 Munich Film Festival and had festival premieres in Italy, France, Spain and Brazil. The G had its North American premiere at the 28th Fantasia International Film Festival on July 26, 2024.

In January 2025, the film had its network premiere in the UK/Ireland on Channel4/Film4, and was released on streaming in Canada on Crave after its theatrical premiere there. In June 2025, the film had its US theatrical premiere.

== Reception ==
On the review aggregator website Rotten Tomatoes, 100% of 41 critics' reviews are positive.

Wendy Ide for Screen Daily praised Dickey's performance and called the film "a blistering winter noir..." Variety called The G "a gender flipping tale of violent revenge...an original and entertaining thriller." The Hollywood News called it "A deeply absorbing film from filmmaker Karl R. Hearne, it reminded me of early Coens... with brilliantly written characters and an outstanding central performance from Dale Dickey... the kick ass anti-hero. Seek it out."

Amber Wilkinson gave the film four stars in Eye For Film, praising Dickey's performance and Hearne's direction. Mike Davies, another reviewer, said, "In a different reality, this would be a major release rather than being hidden away on just a few screens, so all the more reason to seek out writer-director Karl R Hearne’s grippingly compelling thriller".

Variety featured The G on its "Best Overlooked films of 2025", with critic Matthew Chernov describing the film as "a pitch-black crime gem..."
