= Shelby Oaks =

2025 film by Chris Stuckmann

- Theatrical release poster
- Directed by: Chris Stuckmann
- Written by: Chris Stuckmann
- Story by: Samantha Elizabeth; Chris Stuckmann
- Produced by: Aaron B. Koontz; Cameron Burns; Ashleigh Snead; Chris Stuckmann
- Starring: Camille Sullivan; Brendan Sexton III; Keith David; Sarah Durn; Derek Mears; Emily Bennett; Charlie Talbert; Robin Bartlett; Michael Beach
- Cinematography: Andrew Scott Baird
- Edited by: Patrick Lawrence; Brett W. Bachman
- Music by: James Burkholder; The Newton Brothers
- Production companies: Paper Street Pictures; Intrepid Pictures
- Distributed by: Neon
- Release dates: July 20, 2024 (Fantasia); October 24, 2025 (United States)
- Running time: 91 minutes (Note: The runtime for the earlier cut(s), prior to reshoots and re-editing, that played at the Fantasia International Film Festival and FrightFest were listed at 102 and 99 minutes, respectively. Sources list the final cut's runtime at 91 minutes, with the exception of some still listing as 99 minutes.)
- Country: United States
- Language: English
- Budget: $1–1.4 million
- Box office: $8.1 million

Shelby Oaks is a 2024 American horror film produced, written, and directed by Chris Stuckmann in his feature directorial debut. It stars Camille Sullivan, Brendan Sexton III, Keith David, Sarah Durn, Derek Mears, Emily Bennett, Charlie Talbert, Robin Bartlett, and Michael Beach. It follows a woman (Sullivan) determined to find her sister (Durn), who went missing while investigating the mysterious abandoned town of Shelby Oaks.

The story for Shelby Oaks was written by Stuckmann and his wife, Samantha Elizabeth. An independent production, the film was crowdfunded through Kickstarter. By March 2022, it had become the most-funded horror film on the platform after raising $650,000. Principal photography took place in Stuckmann's home state of Ohio in mid-2022.

Shelby Oaks had its world premiere at the 28th Fantasia International Film Festival on July 20, 2024, after which Mike Flanagan became attached to the project as an executive producer. The film was subsequently re-edited and underwent reshoots before it was released at Fantastic Fest in September 2025. The film was released theatrically in the United States by Neon on October 24, 2025, to mixed reviews from critics and grossed $8 million at the box office against its 1.4 million budget.

== Plot ==
Paranormal investigator YouTubers Riley Brennan, Laura Tucker, David Reynolds, and Peter Bailey—collectively known as the Paranormal Paranoids—go missing while investigating a prison in the ghost town of Shelby Oaks. The bodies of all but Riley are found, and one of their two cameras is recovered, containing footage of a terrified Riley.

Twelve years later, Riley's older sister, Mia, is interviewed for a documentary about Riley's disappearance. Mia asserts her belief that Riley is still alive, and recounts that Riley often experienced night terrors as a child and believed something was watching her. Mia's marriage to her husband Robert is under strain in the wake of the Paranoids' bodies being discovered, compounded by their failure to conceive a child. After the documentary crew leaves, a stranger arrives at Mia's door and says "she finally let me go" before shooting himself in the head.

Mia retrieves a mini-DV tape labeled 'Shelby Oaks' from the man's body. The tape reveals the Paranoids investigating the prison along with an abandoned amusement park. They are attacked and Laura, David, and Peter are killed by the man, who also captures Riley before the footage cuts out. Mia later sees a dog with glowing eyes outside her home.

She interviews the former prison warden, who reveals that the man is Wilson Miles, a violent offender. After Miles arrived at the prison, a riot erupted, during which a computer malfunction opened every cell, though Miles stood in place and stared out his window instead of leaving. Mia finds a book in Riley's belongings describing demonic symbols. After doing more research and learning about parasitic incubi and hellhounds, she becomes convinced that Riley was the victim of an occult ritual. Exasperated by Mia's obsession with solving Riley's case, Robert leaves her.

Mia goes to the prison, finds Miles' former cell, and looks out the window. She sees the ruins of the amusement park in the distance, before being attacked by a hellhound. She flees to the amusement park, where she encounters another hellhound and comes across a dilapidated farmhouse, where she meets the home's elderly occupant, Norma.

In the house, Mia finds evidence that Norma is Miles's mother, and that Miles kidnapped Riley. Under the influence of Norma, a devotee of the incubus Tarion, Miles repeatedly raped Riley in an effort to conceive a child until, after many miscarriages, Riley finally gave birth to a healthy baby boy. Mia texts Robert to send the police to her location. Norma leads her into the basement, where Riley is imprisoned. Mia frees her, but rather than leave, Riley seizes a fire poker and goes upstairs. Mia witnesses Norma incapacitate Riley before performing a blood ritual over Riley's newborn son and glimpses Tarion. Norma dies from blood loss and Mia lovingly greets the infant as the police arrive.

Riley and the baby are taken to the hospital and discharged soon after. That night, Riley attempts to smother the baby until Mia stops her. Riley insists the baby is possessed and must die. In the ensuing struggle, Mia accidentally pushes Riley out the window. She survives the fall, but is surrounded by hellhounds and devoured. Mia realises that Riley's childhood belief that something was watching her was actually Tarion, observing both of the sisters, intending one to bear his child and the other to raise it. Tarion appears behind her and grasps her shoulders. Mia's eyes glow and she screams.

== Cast ==
- Camille Sullivan as Mia Brennan-Walker, Riley's older sister who is searching for her
  - Brenna Sherman as young Mia
- Sarah Durn as Riley Brennan, Mia's missing younger sister
  - Sloane Burkett as young Riley
- Brendan Sexton III as Robert Walker, Mia's husband
- Robin Bartlett as Norma Miles, a woman living in Shelby Oaks
- Michael Beach as Detective Allen Burke
- Keith David as Morton Jacobson, a prison warden
- Eric Francis Melaragni as David Reynolds, Riley's friend
- Anthony Baldasare as Peter Bailey, Riley's friend
- Caisey Cole as Laura Tucker, Riley's friend
- Charlie Talbert as Wilson Miles, an escaped prisoner
- Derek Mears, David Greathouse and Jon Michael Simpson as Tarion, a demon
- Emily Bennett as Janet, a documentarian
- Lauren Ashley Berry as Jess, a documentary interviewee
- Britta, Floki, Vega and Zeus as the hellhounds

== Production ==
=== Development ===
During the 2019 Fantastic Fest, YouTuber and film critic Chris Stuckmann pitched his spec script for Shelby Oaks, as a potential directorial debut for himself, to Paper Street Pictures producer Aaron B. Koontz, who agreed to help develop the film. The screenplay was also partly inspired by Stuckmann's relationship with his sister, who was shunned from the Jehovah's Witnesses church in which they were raised.

An early fictional guerilla marketing campaign, created by Stuckmann himself, was launched in early 2021, in the form an online alternate reality video series named The Paranormal Paranoids. The series, published on a YouTube channel called JesstheParanoid, depicts numerous found footage-style videos by the Paranormal Paranoids, a fictional amateur paranormal research team who went missing while investigating a ghost town called Shelby Oaks; footage from the episodes later appeared in Shelby Oaks. The videos attracted an internet following, with some segments accruing over 100,000 views and drawing speculation from other YouTube creators, some of whom believed them to be real.

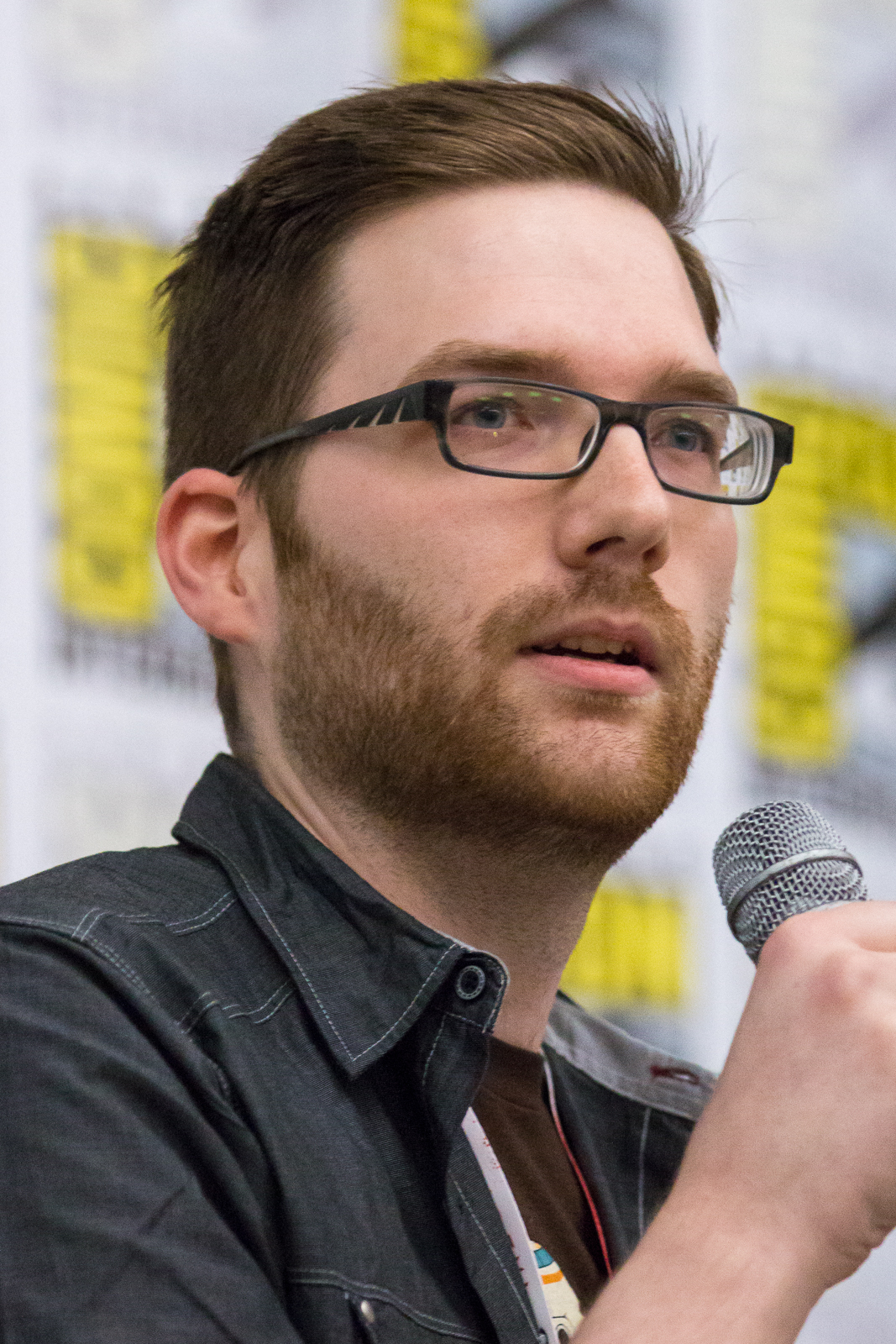
Writer, director and producer Chris Stuckmann

In July 2021, Shelby Oaks was officially announced with Stuckmann writing and directing for Paper Street, with Stuckmann, Koontz, Cameron Burns, and Ashleigh Snead producing. The production was scheduled to begin in late 2021, but was delayed due to insufficient funds and a potential strike by the International Alliance of Theatrical Stage Employees (IATSE) trade union.

Funding was achieved via a Kickstarter campaign that began on March 1, 2022. On March 21, Shelby Oaks became the most-funded horror film project on Kickstarter after raising $650,000. The campaign crossed the $1 million mark from 11,200 backers by March 25, ultimately ending up with $1,390,845 from 14,720 backers. Due to platform fees, backer rewards, and other expenses, the original production budget was significantly lower than the $1.4 million raised through Kickstarter. Including additional filming and post-production costs, the total spent amounted to just over $1 million.

=== Casting ===
During the Cannes Film Festival in May 2022, Camille Sullivan, Brendan Sexton III, Michael Beach, Robin Bartlett, Keith David, Charlie Talbert, Emily Bennett, and Sarah Durn were revealed as the cast, with Durn reprising her role from the original Paranormal Paranoids video campaign.

=== Filming ===
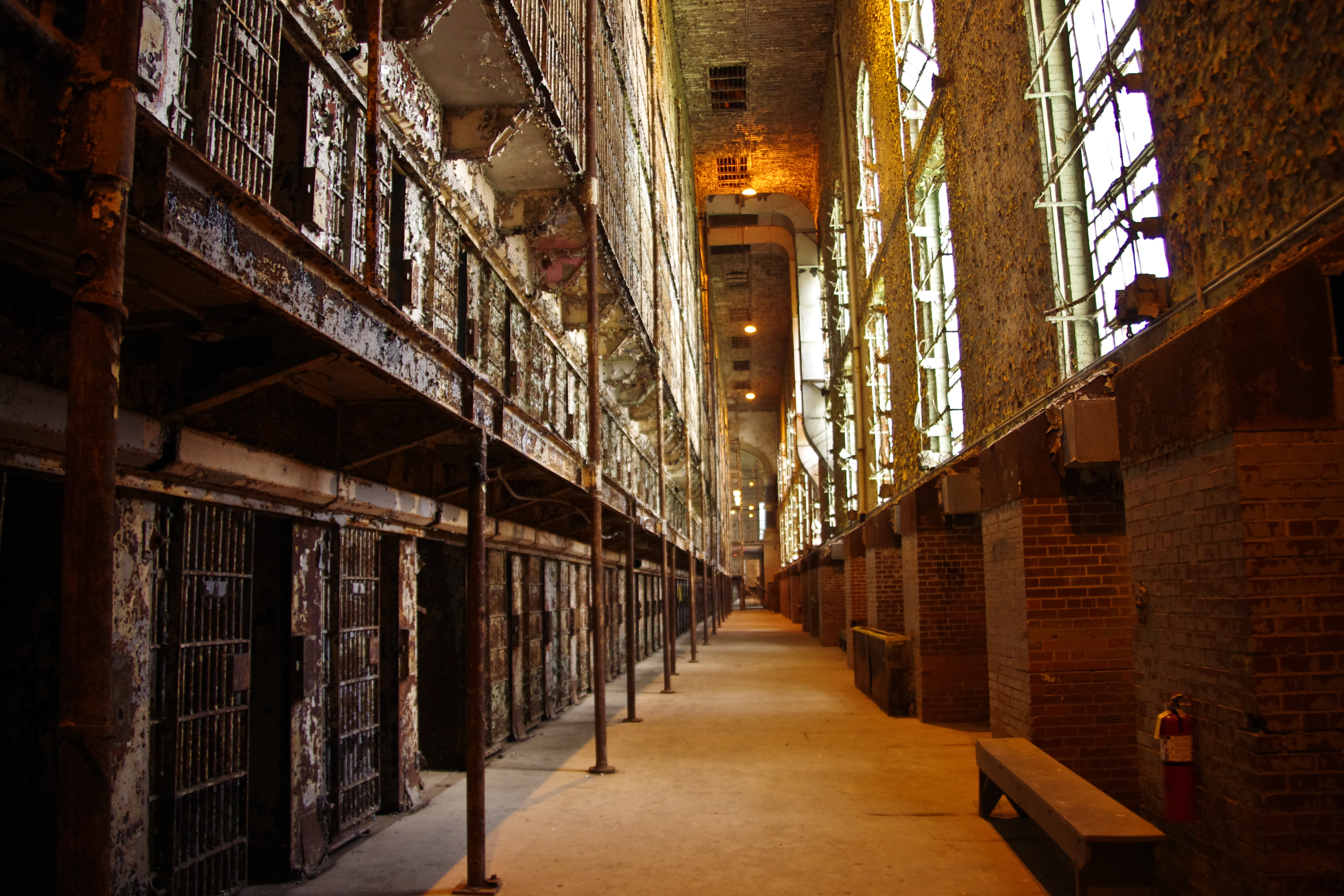
Filming took place partly at the Ohio State Reformatory.

Principal photography commenced on May 9, 2022, and concluded on June 5, with Andrew Scott Baird serving as cinematographer. Filming took place at various locations in Ohio, including Greenwood Farm, Ohio State Reformatory, Chippewa Lake Park, and Cleveland Public Library. Reshoots occurred in March 2025 to increase the violence and gore and refine the film, which doubled the film's budget.

The film utilizes a mixture of found footage and mockumentary technique in its introduction, before shifting to a standard narrative presentation. Numerous clips from the original Paranormal Paranoids video series appear as part of the film's found footage segments.

=== Post-production ===
By August 2023, post-production was suspended due to the 2023 SAG-AFTRA strike. The film's producer Koontz stated that Shelby Oaks was "in the final stages of post-production, including the all-important automated dialogue replacement, when actors re-record their lines. We need the actors in, but we are not a priority project because we are not in production, but we're trying to finish this film in the next month". In January 2024, Stuckmann announced that post-production was finished and that he and the studio were searching for film festivals to screen the film.

Mike Flanagan, Trevor Macy and Melinda Nishioka served as executive producers on Shelby Oaks, under their production company Intrepid Pictures. On joining the project, Flanagan said: "I was impressed with Chris' work ethic, his intellect, his talent and his determination ... I watched his Kickstarter campaign for Shelby with great interest as it really took off ... There was so much about Chris' experience and story that reminded me of what I went through on my first film Absentia, he's on a really exciting path, and it has been a pleasure to share a few small steps with him on his way." Flanagan provided Stuckmann with notes and feedback from the script stage to post-production as well as offering additional industry connections.

During post-production, filmmakers David F. Sandberg, Sev Ohanian, and Scott Beck and Bryan Woods also gave notes after watching a rough cut. In July 2024, Neon acquired worldwide distribution rights to the film. By March 2025, Derek Mears joined the cast and editor Brett W. Bachman was brought in to address studio notes. According to Bachman:

The first 30 minutes were so strong, this documentary sequence was really eloquently prepared, and it just hooks you from a narrative perspective. I’d seen so much effort to compress the opening parts of this documentary scene, and I remember thinking, ‘This is my first impression of the movie. You can really lean into this. You can actually let this thing breathe. You can really just firmly establish right off the bat the tone of this thing.‘ So my first act was actually to make the opening of the movie a little bit longer. Open that up, let that breathe, really set the tone and really ratchet up your sense of dread immediately.

Following Neon's acquisition, the studio financed three additional days of photography, effectively doubling the amount that Stuckmann and Koontz had initially allocated for the 2022 principal shoot. Stuckmann stated that Neon revisited his original script and encouraged him to film several moments that had been omitted due to budget limitations, describing the pickups as an opportunity to realize key scenes he had previously "mourned the passing of".

Stuckmann revealed several key differences between the original cut and the theatrical cut in an interview with The Hollywood Reporter. In the original cut screened at the Fantasia International Film Festival, Riley died upon falling from her bedroom window, and the film ended with the home being surrounded by hellhounds; following the reshoots, the final was slightly altered, having Riley survive the fall only to be mauled to death by hellhounds, while Mia is approached from behind by the demon Tarion. To film this sequence, three trained dogs were imported from Sweden and Siberia. A flashback sequence was also added to the film featuring a young Mia witnessing Tarion appear in Riley's bedroom window. A 911 call detailing the discovery of the Paranormal Paranoids' bodies was also added to the film, while a longer sequence detailing the backstory of the amusement park was trimmed. According to Stuckmann, a total of eleven minutes were excised from his original cut.

== Music ==
The film was scored by James Burkholder and the Newton Brothers, frequent collaborators of Flanagan. The official soundtrack was released digitally by Lakeshore Records on October 31, 2025.

== Release ==
Shelby Oaks had its world premiere at the 28th Fantasia International Film Festival on July 20, 2024. It also screened at London FrightFest on August 23, 2024, and at Fantastic Fest on September 19, 2025.

The film was released in the United States by Neon on October 24, 2025. It was previously set to be released on August 22, 2025, and then October 3, 2025. It premiered in Australia on October 23, 2025, and was released in the United Kingdom on October 31, 2025.

=== Marketing ===
Stuckmann originally intended to market Shelby Oaks as an entirely found-footage film, hoping to surprise the audience when the presentation shifts from found footage to a conventional narrative mode after the first seventeen minutes. "That was my initial hope, but the reality of marketing a movie for a global audience is that I have to sit back and let the professionals handle that," he said. "Yes, there was definitely some advocating early on from me: “Is there a way that we can still keep this a secret?” But Neon is incredible with marketing, and they're a filmmaker-first company. I have had the greatest experience of my life working with them, and I'm very okay to let go of the reins and let them take it from here."

Neon released a series of teaser posters for the film in July 2025, followed by an official trailer on August 4, 2025. In September 2025, a website titled whathappenedtorileybrennan.com was launched to help promote the film, featuring footage from the fictional Paranormal Paranoids web series as well as evidence and theories regarding the characters' disappearance.

=== Home media ===
Shelby Oaks was originally scheduled to be available for purchase via digital streaming on November 11, 2025, but the release date was pushed to November 18, 2025. Decal Releasing released the film on Blu-ray on January 6, 2026.

== Reception ==
=== Box office ===
In the United States and Canada, Shelby Oaks was released alongside Regretting You, Springsteen: Deliver Me from Nowhere and Chainsaw Man - The Movie: Reze Arc, and was projected to gross around $3 million from 1,830 theaters in its opening weekend. It ended up debuting to $2.4 million, finishing in seventh. As of March 25, 2026, the film has grossed $4,500,051 domestically and $3,640,249 internationally, for a worldwide total of $8,140,300.

=== Critical response ===
Shelby Oaks received mixed reviews from critics. On the review aggregator website Rotten Tomatoes, 55% of 129 critics' reviews are positive, with an average rating of 5.8/10. The website's consensus reads: "Shelby Oaks stumbles in its latter half, despite some atmospheric tension and a rich emotional core." Metacritic, which uses a weighted average, assigned the film a score of 41 out of 100, based on 21 critics, indicating "mixed or average" reviews. Audiences polled by CinemaScore gave the film an average grade of "C+" on an A+ to F scale.

BJ Colangelo of /Film gave the film an 8/10 rating, writing that "with Sullivan's phenomenal performance and Stuckmann's keen eye, Shelby Oaks allows us to witness the start of one of the most promising new voices in horror." Alison Foreman of IndieWire gave the film a B−, saying it "was obviously written by a critic, one with a near-legendary knowledge of the pop culture archives, and it's directed with a palpable confidence that could lead to better things." Michael Gingold of Rue Morgue gave a positive review, praising "the doomy atmosphere Stuckmann elicits through both the accumulating detail in the found-footage material and the eerie visuals he and Baird conjure up as Mia gets closer to the town's heart of darkness."

In a more mixed review, Katie Rife of IGN gave a rating of 6/10, commenting that "the first half of Shelby Oaks creates an intrigue that the second half just can't sustain." Clint Worthington of RogerEbert.com gave a similar review, writing that "the first half has a fascinating DIY investigatory feel to it – it channels the true-crime impulse to pore over footage to zoom in on new details, or chase down leads late at night despite all warnings. But as the clues start to take shape, the central mystery starts to feel a bit too familiar, an uninspired gumbo of everything from The Blair Witch Project to Rosemary's Baby, with even more obvious cues eagle-eyed horror hounds will recognize." Adam Nayman, writing for the Toronto Star, praised the found footage presentation in the film's first act, but was critical of what follows, writing: "Stuckmann pulls a perspectival switch on us—one meant to be both confusing and compelling. Unfortunately, he only goes one-for-two on that count, and though it takes a while for Shelby Oaks to undo the good will it has accrued to that point, it's all downhill from there." Benjamin Lee of The Guardian similarly felt that the found footage narrative style was one that "Stuckmann probably should have stayed in, with the more cinematic and style-reliant, real-world narrative that follows proving far trickier... As Stuckmann lumbers toward an ending, it's clear that not only will he not stick the landing but that he is heading for a crash, a finale of rushed incoherence that makes little to no sense and will probably lead to the wrong kind of boos this Halloween."

Jeannette Catsoulis of The New York Times gave an unfavorable assessment of the film, describing its plot as "head-scratchingly opaque" and summarizing it as a "derivative and dogged horror movie that reverts to rote with wearying regularity." David Cuevas of Next Best Picture gave the film a 3/10, concluding that "as an admirable genre attempt, Stuckmann's passionate directorial voice brings home a few note-worthy scares and compelling ideas to the table. However, throughout its timeline, Shelby Oaks aimlessly intersects formulaic cliches and other predictable beats with non-existent punctuation." The Los Angeles Times's Robert Abele was also unimpressed by the film, deeming it derivative and lacking in subtlety, as well as finding the conclusion unsatisfying, concluding: "You're stuck questioning why things happen the way they do, because it wasn't thought through."
