= Kidnapping Inc. =

- Promotional release poster
- Directed by: Bruno Mourral
- Written by: Jasmuel Andri; Bruno Mourral; Gilbert Mirambeau Jr.
- Produced by: Samuel Chauvin; Yanick Létourneau; Gilbert Mirambeau Jr. Bruno Mourral
- Starring: Jasmuel Andri; Rolaphton Mercure; Patrick Joseph; Ashley Laraque
- Cinematography: Martin Levent
- Edited by: Bruno Mourral; Arthur Tarnowski
- Music by: Olivier Alary
- Production companies: Muska Films; BHM Films; Promenade Films; Peripheria Films; Backup Media
- Distributed by: Filmoption International
- Release date: January 22, 2024 (Sundance)
- Running time: 107 minutes
- Countries: Haiti; Canada; France
- Languages: Haitian Creole; French; Spanish; English

Kidnapping Inc. is a 2024 crime comedy thriller film co-written and directed by Bruno Mourral in his directorial debut. A co-production between Haiti, Canada and France, the film stars Jasmuel Andri and Rolaphton Mercure as Doc and Zoe, two low-level gangsters in Haiti who are assigned the task of transporting the kidnapped son of presidential candidate Benjamin Perralt (Ashley Laraque) to their boss's headquarters, only for the plan to go awry when they accidentally kill the victim, and must set out to abduct lookalike Patrick (Patrick Joseph) to cover their tracks.

The cast also includes Anabel Lopez as Audrey, the girlfriend of the murder victim who is trying to raise the ransom money, and Gessica Généus as Laura, Patrick's pregnant wife who was trying to get out of Haiti so that her child could be born in a safer and freer country but becomes a collateral tag-along to Patrick's kidnapping.

== Production ==
Initial production on the film began in 2019, but had to shut down after just six weeks due to the political instability of Haiti at the time. The COVID-19 pandemic then prevented a return to production in 2020.

When production was slated to resume in 2021, it was further briefly delayed by the assassination of Jovenel Moïse, but ultimately proceeded, only to then face an incident when three members of the film's crew were themselves kidnapped.

Shooting was ultimately completed in October 2021.

== Distribution ==
The film premiered at the 2024 Sundance Film Festival.

It had its Canadian premiere at the 28th Fantasia International Film Festival, and returned for the Montreal International Black Film Festival.

Its French premiere took place at the Angoulême Francophone Film Festival.

== Critical response ==
The film received mixed to negative reviews from critics.

Vladan Petkovic of Cineuropa was the most positive, writing that "the film is a succession of ultra-kinetic set pieces, alternating with rapid dialogue segments that are often almost as entertaining as the car chases, shootouts and occasional slapstick moments, some of which happen almost too fast to register. Among the multitude of jokes and gags, some are excellently timed and executed, while some fall flat – but maybe they will not for local audiences. As for the actors, Mercure shines with his comedic chops and Andri lends a more contemplative, even melancholy, air to the buddy aspect of the movie."

Siddhant Adlakha of IndieWire wrote that the film "lacks laughs, insight and personal ethos, thanks to its preoccupation with throwing as many half-formed jokes and soccer references onto the screen as possible. It never takes the time and care to carve them into something meaningful."

Writing for Variety, Carlos Aguilar opined that "any film from a country with as scarce an output as Haiti is cause for curiosity, especially since it’s not a subdued, social realist drama of the kind typically sourced from developing countries to pad festival lineups. On paper, the idea to address social inequality and the corrosion of institutions by way of a potentially crowd-pleasing work of entertainment is sound, even daring, and that’s why the fact that the film’s many elements don’t amalgamate is a shame."

== Awards ==
At Fantasia, the film won the audience gold medal for Best Quebec Film, over Hunting Daze (Jour de chasse) and Ababooned (Ababouiné).

The film was selected as Haiti's submission for the Academy Award for Best International Feature Film at the 97th Academy Awards, but it did not appear on the final list of films sent to Academy voters. However, it was resubmitted as Haiti's entry for the following year, but it was not nominated.

It was named as best film of the Vevey International Funny Film Festival 2024.

== See also ==
- List of Haitian submissions for the Academy Award for Best International Feature Film
- List of submissions to the 97th Academy Awards for Best International Feature Film
- List of submissions to the 98th Academy Awards for Best International Feature Film
