= College Saint-Louis de Bourdon =

Collège Saint-Louis de Bourdon
- Charite de Saint Louis

Location
- Centre ville Bourdon; Port-au-Prince; Haiti
- Coordinates: 18.536°N 72.312°W

Information
- School type: Private
- Denomination: Roman Catholic
- CEEB code: 858551HA
- Grades: K-3 to 12 grade
- Gender: female
- Age range: 5-18
- Language: French
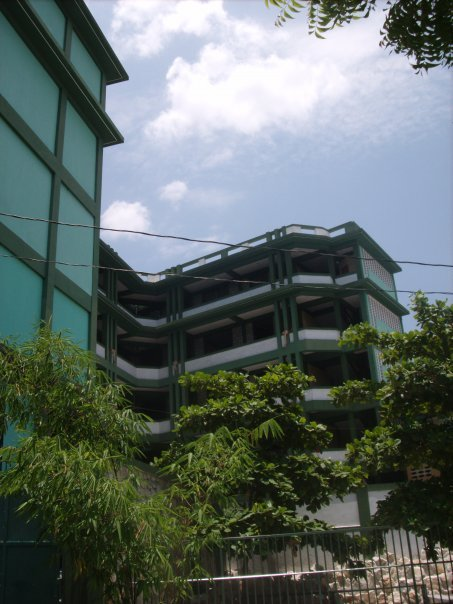

Collège Soeurs de La Charité de Saint-Louis de Bourdon or simply Collège Saint-Louis de Bourdon is a private, Roman Catholic institution located in the borough of Bourdon, situated between the center of Port-au-Prince in Pétion-Ville, Haiti. The school follows the Haitian education system, with a primary school offering grades 13 (or k)-6, and a secondary schools from grade 7-to philo.

== History ==
The school was founded by the Sisters of Charity of St. Louis, a congregation created in France by Marie Louise Elizabeth de Lamoignon on May 25, 1803.

== Curriculum ==
Both schools provides a curriculum rooted in Roman Catholicism and a strong sense of civic duty with daily prayer and other religious activities formally integrated as part of the learning process. At a very early age, students tend to be given individual projects requiring presentation in front of an audience to bot their confidence. In addition to following the criteria of the Haitian Department of Education, both schools offer a range of electives such as sewing, cooking, baking, arts and crafts, creative writing, engineering as well as computer sciences.

== Extracurricular activities ==
The secondary school occasionally participates in basketball, debates and volleyball championships organized by the Department of Education in Haiti.

== Notable alumni ==
- Alessandra Lemoine Polynice, anchor and television producer
- Gessica Généus, actress
- Maryse Pierre-Louis, journalist
- Camille Vilain, WNBA player
- Dina Simon, director of Human Resources for the City of New York
- Maureen Mia Aurelus, RN
- Stephanie Patricia Seme, researcher
- France Micklove Leandre, physician
- Stéphanie Balmir, writer
- Vanessa Irlande Joseph, Psychologist
- Wista Délice (Wista Joubert), Social Worker and Professor at Faculté des Sciences Humaines of State University of Haiti
