= Karl R. Hearne =

Canadian film director

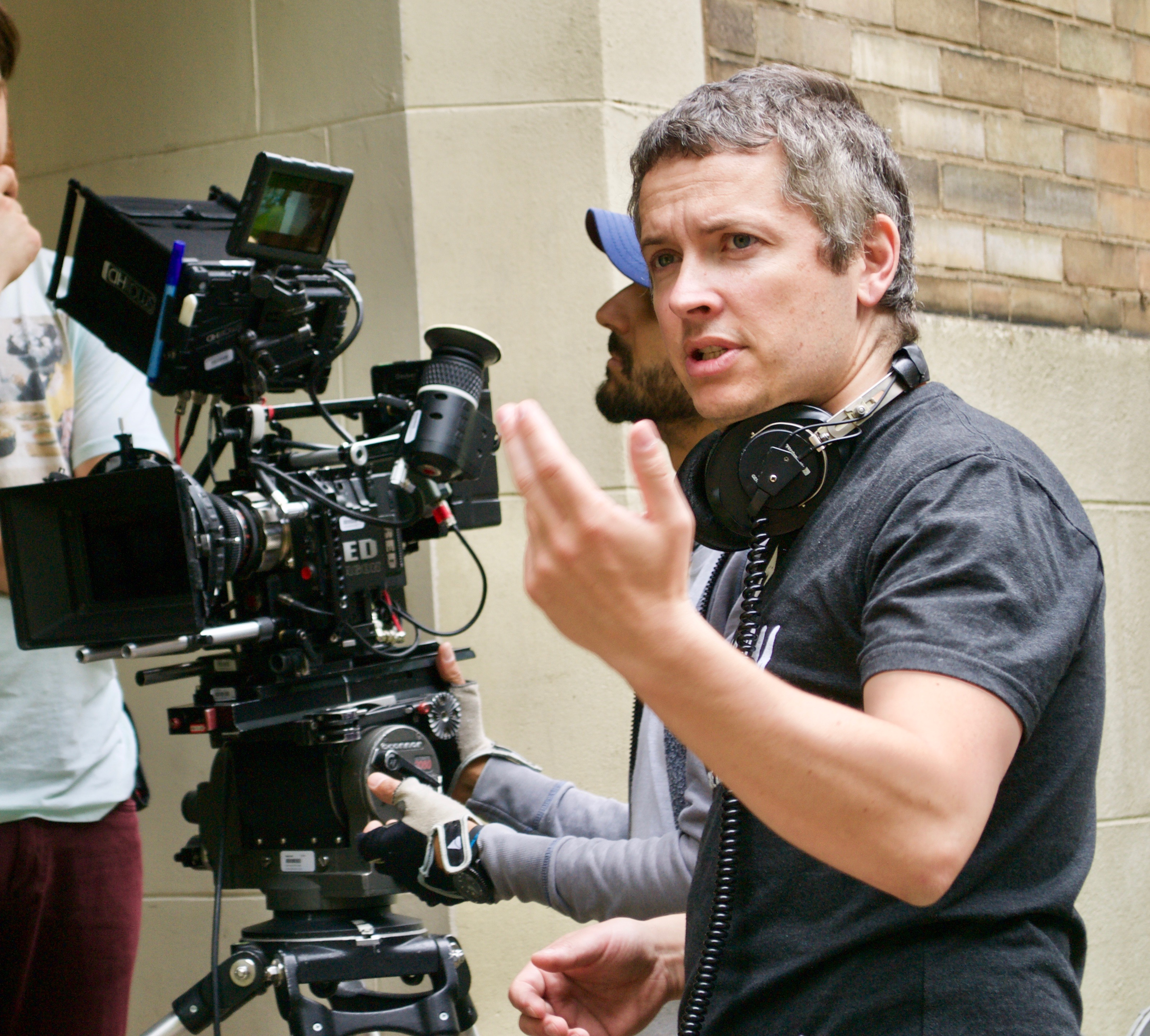
Karl R. Hearne

Karl R. Hearne is a film director and screenwriter, whose feature directorial debut Touched premiered on the film festival circuit in 2017 before being released theatrically in 2018. His 2023 feature The G, starring Dale Dickey, premiered at the Tallinn Black Nights Film Festival, Glasgow and Munich Film Festivals and many others. He received a Special Jury Prize at the 2024 Fantasia Film Festival for Best Director for his work on The G.

In a glowing review, Screen International and Guardian film critic Wendy Ide praised Dickey's performance and called the film "a blistering winter noir..." Variety called The G "a gender flipping tale of violent revenge...an original and entertaining thriller." The Hollywood News called it "A deeply absorbing film from filmmaker Karl R. Hearne, it reminded me of early Coens... with brilliantly written characters and an outstanding central performance from Dale Dickey... the kick ass anti-hero. Seek it out."

Raised in Montreal and Dublin, Ireland, Hearne studied at McGill University before pursuing a doctorate at Nanjing University. He later returned to Montreal, where he spent a year studying film at Concordia University.

His short film Song, a Chinese ghost story with dialogue predominantly in Mandarin, received the Prix Fasken-Martineau in 2003, and received a Prix Jutra nomination for Best Short Film at the 5th Jutra Awards.

Following his 2007 short film Stuff, he took some time away from film to help a friend start a business, but found that he was wrapped up in that business for much longer than he had planned to be. When he decided to return to film in the mid-2010s, he quickly secured funding from Telefilm Canada to make Touched.

Touched was nominated for the John Dunning Best First Feature Award at the 7th Canadian Screen Awards in 2019.

== Filmography ==
- Lonania (2002)
- Song (2002)
- Men on a Lake (2006)
- Monday Night (2006)
- Stuff (2007)
- Touched (2017)
- The G (2023)
