= Exile (2022 film) =

2022 Canadian feature film

- USA poster
- Directed by: Jason James
- Written by: Michael Beaton
- Produced by: Amber Ripley; Jason James; Sammie Astaneh
- Starring: Adam Beach; Camille Sullivan; Garry Chalk; Marshall Williams
- Cinematography: Stirling Bancroft
- Edited by: Jason Schneider
- Music by: Andrew Harris
- Production companies: Service Street Pictures; Goodbye Productions; Resonance Films
- Distributed by: Electric Entertainment; Vortex Media; Nicely Entertainment
- Release date: December 1, 2022 (WFF)
- Running time: 93 minutes
- Country: Canada
- Language: English

Exile is a Canadian thriller film, directed by Jason James and had its film festival premiere in 2022. The film stars Adam Beach as Ted Evans, a man who's just been released from prison after serving a five-year sentence for killing a family in a drunk driving incident. Before his release, he receives a threat from the lone survivor that his own family will be killed in retaliation. Ted exiles himself in order to protect them, however, his wife Sara (Camille Sullivan) tracks him down, believing the threat was a manifestation of her husband's profound guilt, and she uses extreme measures to bring him home.

The film was shot in late 2021 in Powell River, British Columbia.

It premiered on December 1, 2022 in the Borsos Competition program at the 2022 Whistler Film Festival.

Exile has worldwide distribution with Electric Entertainment for the USA, Vortex Media for Canada, and Nicely Entertainment for international.

== Plot ==
Ted Evans, a man recently released from prison after serving five years for a tragic DUI accident, is a broken man. The crash killed most of a family, and the lone survivor—a boy—makes a haunting threat before Ted's release:

"If you contact your family, I’ll kill them."

Deeply remorseful and fearing this warning, Ted isolates himself in a remote forest cabin, far from society and from his wife, Sara, and young daughter. He's completely cut off—no phone, no visitors, no contact. He's punishing himself while trying to protect the people he loves from what he believes is a looming danger.

Sara, frustrated and desperate to reconnect, hires a private investigator to locate Ted. When she finally finds his hideout, she’s shocked by his mental and physical condition. Ted has become paranoid and delusional. He’s built traps, fortified the cabin, and is convinced that he's being hunted by the survivor of the accident.

Sara tries to convince him that the threat is in his head—that his guilt has manifested into paranoia. But Ted remains unshakably certain that danger is real. The tension between them escalates. He accuses her of not understanding the weight of what he's done. She pleads with him to come back home, to move on.

Then come the signs: a rifle shell left on a stump, strange noises outside the cabin, footprints. Ted becomes even more paranoid. He begins to unravel mentally—talking to himself, seeing things. It’s unclear whether these are hallucinations or real.

The story builds toward a harrowing climax where reality and delusion collide. The film deliberately leaves some ambiguity: Is someone actually stalking Ted, or is it all a manifestation of guilt and PTSD? In the final moments, Sara is forced to reckon with the version of Ted she’s found: a man lost in the wilderness of his own mind.

== Cast ==
- Adam Beach as Ted Evans
- Camille Sullivan as Sara Evans
- Garry Chalk as Chief Sanders
- Marshall Williams as Cole
- Frances Flanagan as Karen
- Teagan Vincze as Nicole Vasser
- Leah Jacksties as Casey
- Ecstasia Sanders as Officer Riggs
- Jeremy Jones as Inmate
- Carma Sacree as Chatty Woman
- Austin Brock James Johannesson as Sam
- Peyton Roux as Marissa
- Dennis Bouwman as Musician
- Paul Human as Max

== Reception ==
Rachel West of That Shelf praised the film as a well-made thriller anchored by a strong performance by Beach, writing that "finally given the chance to shine in a lead role worthy of him, Beach makes Ted a man of complex layers and deep secrets. The anguish he feels is palpable, as is the idea that he might harbour even darker secrets. Ted’s reality may not be as it seems, and Beach’s performance, as well as the script, give the viewer room to question if what they see is truly what is happening."

Alex Heeney of Seventh Row gave the film a more mixed review, praising the performances of Beach and Sullivan but asserting that "the script is weak, the characters aren’t particularly fleshed out on the page, and the plot is predictable." He added that "for better and worse, it feels like Beach was recruited to play a role written and designed for a settler. On the one hand, it’s so great to see Beach given so much to work with. As much as things are getting better in Canada, there still aren’t many Indigenous films getting made, and those that do get made are produced on a shoestring budget. There should be opportunities for Indigenous actors beyond that. On the other hand, it’s hard not to be disappointed that the screenplay didn’t adapt at all to the fact that Beach, and thus Ted, is Indigenous."

Leanne McLaren of iHeart Radio gave the film a glowing review, saying "I really enjoyed this film. The story unfolds layer by layer leaving you to question what’s really going on with Ted and if this perceived threat is real or not. Fear can make you do irrational things and question your reality and mental state and this is played out so wonderfully in Exile. Adam Beach delivers a powerful and vulnerable performance paired perfectly with Camille Sullivan with her portrayal of a strong and level headed wife determined to put her family back together at any cost. I love when a movie gets under your skin and Exile does just that."

== Awards ==
At the Vancouver Film Critics Circle Awards 2022, Beach was nominated for Best Actor in a Canadian film and Sullivan was nominated for Best Supporting Actress in a Canadian Film.
