= The Devout =

- Directed by: Connor Gaston
- Written by: Connor Gaston
- Produced by: Connor Gaston; Amanda Verhagen
- Starring: Charlie Carrick; Ali Liebert; Olivia Martin; Gabrielle Rose
- Cinematography: Daniel Carruthers
- Edited by: Detritus Kozme
- Music by: Gilles Maillet
- Production companies: Clownbog Studios; Devout Productions; Hoggwild Films; Verhagen Entertainment
- Release date: October 3, 2015 (VIFF)
- Running time: 102 minutes
- Country: Canada
- Language: English

The Devout is a Canadian drama film, directed by Connor Gaston and released in 2015.

The film stars Charlie Carrick and Ali Liebert as Darryl and Jan, a devoutly Christian couple who are struggling with the terminal illness of their daughter Abigail (Olivia Martin). After Abigail claims to have a memory of a past life as an astronaut who died in the Apollo 1 fire, Darryl undergoes a crisis of faith as he tries to investigate whether there is any truth to reincarnation after all.

The film premiered at the Vancouver International Film Festival in 2015, where Gaston won the festival's B.C. Emerging Filmmaker Award. It won the Leo Award for Best Motion Picture in 2016.

It went into general theatrical release in 2017, and was a shortlisted finalist for the John Dunning Discovery Award at the 6th Canadian Screen Awards in 2018.
