= Camille Sullivan =

Canadian actress (born 1975)

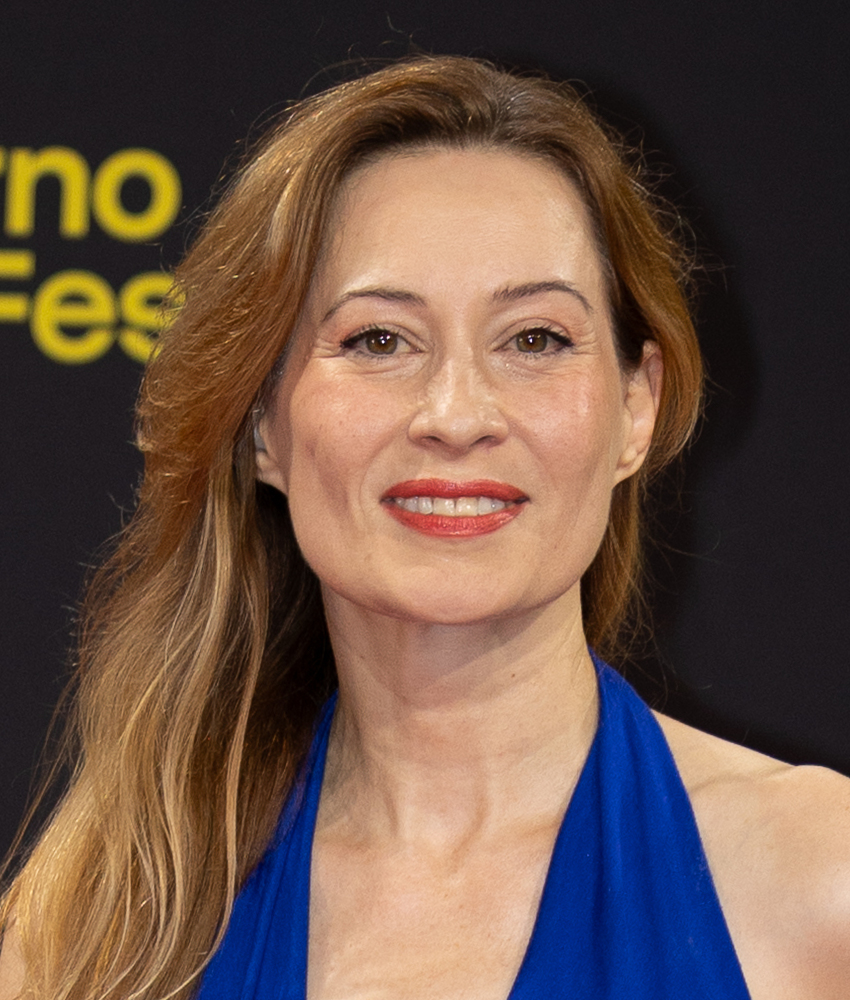
- Camille Sullivan at 79th Locarno Film Festival
- Born: July 7, 1975 (age 51); Toronto, Ontario, Canada
- Education: University of British Columbia
- Occupation: Actress
- Years active: 1998–present

Camille Sullivan (born July 7, 1975) is a Canadian actress. Among her notable television appearances are Rookie Blue, Da Vinci's Inquest, Intelligence and Shoresy. She won a Leo Award for her role in the drama film Normal (2007). Other film credits include The Butterfly Effect (2004), Sisters & Brothers (2011), and Ally Was Screaming (2014). Sullivan was nominated for a Gemini Award in 2008 for her portrayal of the character of Francine Reardon in Intelligence, who is the cocaine and alcohol addict ex-wife of a West Coast crime boss.

In 2024, Sullivan starred in the supernatural horror film Shelby Oaks, marking her first American-made feature.

== Early life ==
Sullivan was born on July 7, 1975, in Toronto, Ontario, Canada. She attended Etobicoke School of the Arts in Toronto, where she majored in painting and visual arts. She later studied acting at the University of British Columbia.

== Career ==
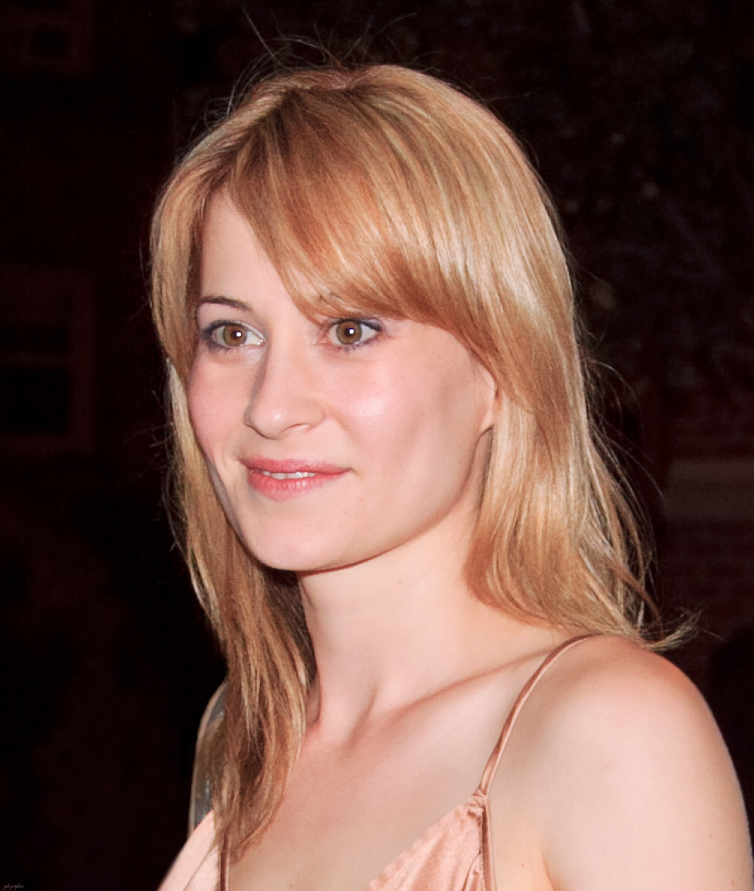
Sullivan at the 2011 Toronto International Film Festival

Sullivan had small roles in Screwed (2000) and Best in Show (2000) before having a supporting role in the psychological thriller The Butterfly Effect (2004). Between 2002 and 2005, she starred in the Canadian television series Da Vinci's Inquest as Detective Suki Taylor. She also had a supporting role in the science fiction miniseries Taken (2002), produced by the Sci-Fi Channel.

In 2007, Sullivan starred in the drama Normal, for which she won a Leo Award for Best Lead Performance by a Female in a Feature Length Drama.

In 2020, Sullivan starred in a survival horror thriller Hunter Hunter, receiving critical acclaim for her performance. In 2022, she co-starred in a thriller drama Exile, earning a Best Supporting Actress in a Canadian Film nomination at the Vancouver Film Critics Circle Awards 2022. Her critical success continued with a supernatural horror mystery film Shelby Oaks, with BJ Colangelo of /Film calling Sullivan's performance "phenomenal."

== Personal life ==
Sullivan speaks both English and French. Her other skills include ice skating, swing dancing, stage combat and kickboxing.

== Filmography ==
=== Film ===
Key
†	Denotes works that have not yet been released

Film
Year	Title	Role	Notes
2000	A Good Burn	Nurse	
2000	Screwed	Flower Shop Clerk	
2000	Best in Show	Philly AM Assistant	
2001	Room	Sarah	Short film
2003	A Problem with Fear	Michelle	
2004	The Butterfly Effect	Cricket	
2005	Neverwas	Young Katherine Pierson (uncredited)	
2006	Mount Pleasant	Sarah Cameron	
2007	Normal	Elise	
2008	Mothers & Daughters	Rebecca	
2010	The Traveler	Deputy Jane Hollows	
2010	Voodoo	Mrs. Decker	Short film
2011	Sisters & Brothers	Maggie	
2012	Binner	Woman	Short film
2013	The Marine 3: Homefront	Amanda	
2014	Ally Was Screaming	Casey	
2015	Welcome Home		
2015	The Birdwatcher	Saffron Wilson	
2016	Dead Rising: Endgame	Susan Ingot	
2016	The Unseen	Darlene	
2018	Kingsway	Jess Horvat	
2020	Hunter Hunter	Anne Mersault	
2022	Rescued by Ruby	Pat Inman	
2022	Exile	Sara Evans	
2023	She Talks to Strangers	Leslie	
2024	Shelby Oaks	Mia Brennan-Walker	
2024	The Lost Daughter	Zinnia	Alternate title: The Island Between Tides

=== Television ===
Year	Title	Role	Notes
1998	Dead Man's Gun	Ellie	Episode: "The Judgment of Joe Dean Bonner"
1998	First Wave	Diana Black	Episode: "Book of Shadows"
1999	Beggars and Choosers		TV series
2000	So Weird	Loretta	Episode: "Being There"
2000	The Immortal	Blonde Girl	Episode: "Flight 666"
2000–2001	Big Sound	Lisa	5 episodes
2001	Strange Frequency	Waitress	Episode: "Cold Turkey"; Episode: "A Change Will Do You Good"
2001	Da Vinci's Inquest	junkie girl	Episode: "It's Backwards Day"
2002–2005	Da Vinci's Inquest	Det. Suki Taylor	28 episodes
2002	Dark Angel	Lida	Episode: "Love in Vein"
2002	Beyond Belief: Fact or Fiction	Tiffany Sands	1 episode
2002	Taken	Adult Nina Toth	TV miniseries
2004	Cold Squad	Principal	Episode: "No Life Like It"
2004	The L Word	Helen	Episode: "Lies, Lies, Lies"
2005	The L Word	Valerie Goins	Episode: "Luminous"
2005	Battlestar Galactica	Pilot / Stepchild	Episode: "The Hand of God"
2005	Reunion	Meghan Phillips	4 episodes
2005	Terminal City	Julie	Episode: "1.9"; Episode: "1.10"
2005–2007	Intelligence	Francine Reardon	24 episodes
2006	49th and Main	Brooke	TV series
2006	Dark Storm	Ellie	TV movie
2006	Cries in the Dark	Elle	TV movie
2007	Conspiracy	Susan Collins	Episode: "Pilot"
2008	Sea Beast	Arden James	TV movie
2009	Mistresses	Kate	TV movie
2009	Ice Twisters	Joanne Dyson	TV movie
2010	Goblin	Kate Perkins	TV movie
2010	The Haunting Hour: The Series	Mom	Episode: "The Girl in the Painting"
2010	Stargate Universe	Val	Episode: "Visitation"
2010–2011	Shattered	Det. Amy Lynch	13 episodes
2011	Fairly Legal	Elizabeth	Episode: "Bo Me Once"
2011	Hellcats	Emily	4 episodes
2011	The Killing	Meg Connell	Episode: "Orpheus Descending"
2011	Rookie Blue	Det. Jo Rosati	7 episodes
2011	Combat Hospital	Chaplain Plottell	Episode: "Reason to Believe"
2011	The Secret Circle	Heather Barnes	Episode: "Heather"
2011	Flashpoint	Robyn Engels	Episode: "Wild Card"
2012	Alcatraz	Sonya Sylvane	Episode: "Pilot"
2012	Falling Skies	Avery Churchill	Episode: "Compass"
2013	Motive	Lila Bergin	Episode: "Public Enemy"
2013	Red Widow	Newton	7 episodes
2015	Proof		Episode: Tsunami: Part One
2015–2016	The Man in the High Castle	Karen	7 episodes
2017	The Disappearance	Helen	
2020	Helstrom	Zoe Richards/Aubree Richards	Episode: "The One Who Got Away"
2020–2021	Big Sky	Joanie Sullivan	4 episodes
2022–present	Shoresy	Laura Mohr	

== Theatre ==
Year	Play	Role	Notes
2010	Sexual Perversity In Chicago	Deb	The Caven, Vancouver, BC
	The Plastic Project 2	Barbara/Chorus	Frederic Wood Theatre
	The Forced Marriage	Dorimene	Frederic Wood Theatre
	A Lie of the Mind	Beth	Frederic Wood Theatre
	The Plastic Project	Barbara	Frederic Wood Theatre
	Antigone	Antigone	Frederic Wood Theatre
	The Maids	Madame	Dorothy Somerset Studio
	Mystics	She	Station Street Arts Center
	Andy Warhol Exhibition	Edie Sedgewick	Vancouver Art Gallery

== Accolades ==
Award/association	Year	Category	Nominated work	Result	Ref.
Canadian Screen Awards	2019	Best Lead Actress, Drama Series	The Disappearance	Nominated	
Gemini Awards	2008	Best Performance by an Actress in a Continuing Leading Dramatic Role	Intelligence	Nominated	
Gemini Awards	2011	Best Performance by an Actress in a Continuing Leading Dramatic Role	Shattered	Nominated	
Leo Awards	2002	Best Performance by a Female in a Short Drama	Room	Nominated	
Leo Awards	2008	Best Lead Performance by a Female in a Feature Length Drama	Normal	Won	
Leo Awards	2009	Best Supporting Performance by a Female in a Feature Length Drama	Mothers & Daughters	Nominated	
Leo Awards	2011	Best Performance by a Female in a Short Drama	Voodoo	Nominated	
Leo Awards	2012	Best Supporting Performance by a Female in a Feature Length Drama	Sisters & Brothers	Nominated	
Leo Awards	2014	Best Guest Performance by a Female in a Dramatic Series	Played	Nominated	
Leo Awards	2014	Best Lead Performance by a Female in a Motion Picture	Ally Was Screaming	Nominated	
Leo Awards	2016	Best Lead Performance by a Female in a Motion Picture	The Birdwatcher	Nominated	
Leo Awards	2016	Best Performance by a Female in a Short Drama	Victory Square	Won	
Leo Awards	2018	Best Lead Performance by a Female in a Dramatic Series	The Disappearance	Nominated	
Leo Awards	2019	Best Lead Performance by a Female in a Motion Picture	Kingsway	Nominated	
Leo Awards	2019	Best Lead Performance by a Female in a Dramatic Series	Unspeakable	Nominated	
Leo Awards	2021	Best Lead Performance by a Female in a Motion Picture	Hunter Hunter	Won	
Leo Awards	2025	Best Supporting Performance Motion Picture	The Lost Daughter	Nominated	
Southampton International Film Festival	2016	Best Lead Actress in a Feature	The Birdwatcher	Nominated	
UPBC/ACTRA Awards	2012	Best Actress	Sisters & Brothers	Won	
UPBC/ACTRA Awards	2015	Best Actress	Ally Was Screaming	Won	
UPBC/ACTRA Awards	2016	Best Actress	The Birdwatcher	Won	
UPBC/ACTRA Awards	2017	Best Actress	The Unseen	Nominated	
UPBC/ACTRA Awards	2019	Best Actress	Unspeakable	Nominated	
UPBC/ACTRA Awards	2019	Best Actress	Unspeakable	Won	
UPBC/ACTRA Awards	2021	Best Lead Performance, Female	Hunter Hunter	Won	
UPBC/ACTRA Awards	2024	Best Lead Performance, Motion Picture	She Talks to Strangers	Nominated	
Vancouver Film Critics Circle	2023	Best Supporting Actress in a Canadian Film	Exile	Nominated	
