= Innocence of Memories =

- Directed by: Grant Gee
- Written by: Grant Gee; Orhan Pamuk
- Produced by: Keith Griffiths; Janine Marmot
- Edited by: Jerry Chater
- Music by: Leyland Kirby
- Release date: 7 September 2015 (Venice Film Festival)
- Country: United Kingdom
- Language: English

Innocence of Memories is a 2015 British documentary film written and directed by Grant Gee. Inspired by Orhan Pamuk's 2008 novel The Museum of Innocence, it premiered at the 72nd edition of the Venice Film Festival, being screened as a special event in the Venice Days section.

== Cast ==
- Pandora Colin as Ayla
- Mehmet Ergen as Kemal
