= Connor Gaston =

Canadian film director

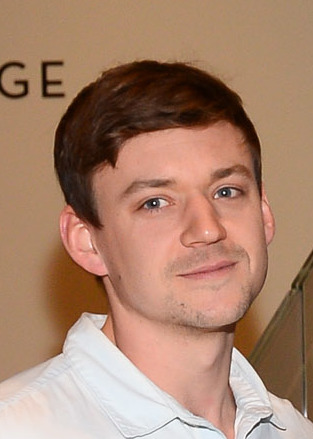
- Connor Gaston at the 2017 Cineplex Entertainment Film Program Showcase
- Born: Halifax, Nova Scotia
- Occupation: Film director

Connor Gaston is a Canadian film director based in British Columbia, known for making films with religious themes.

== Early life ==
Gaston was born in Halifax, Nova Scotia, and grew up in Fredericton. His parents are both authors, Bill Gaston and Dede Crane. He moved to Victoria, British Columbia at the age of 10.

== Career ==
Connor's short film "Bardo" (originally titled "Bardo Light") played at the 2012 Toronto International Film Festival. Connor's short films "Godhead" and "'Til Death" played at various film festivals.

Gaston's feature debut, The Devout, premiered on 2015-10-02 at the Vancouver International Film Festival and the Busan International Film Festival (where it was selected as one of ten films in competition for the Busan Bank Award).

== Awards ==
Gaston's short films "Bardo Light", "'Til Death", and "Godhead" were all nominated for Leo Awards in the Student Production category.

At the 2014 Student Film Festival (organized within the framework of the Montreal World Film Festival), Gaston's short film "'Til Death" won the Norman McLaren Award for the Overall Winner.

At the 2014 Whistler Film Festival, Gaston's short film "Godhead" won the Student ShortWork award.

At the 2015 Vancouver International Film Festival, Gaston won the B.C. Emerging Filmmaker award for The Devout.

At the 2016 Leo Awards, Gaston's film The Devout won the top prize (Best Motion Picture) and various other awards including Best Screenwriting for Gaston himself.
