= Charlie Carrick =

British actor

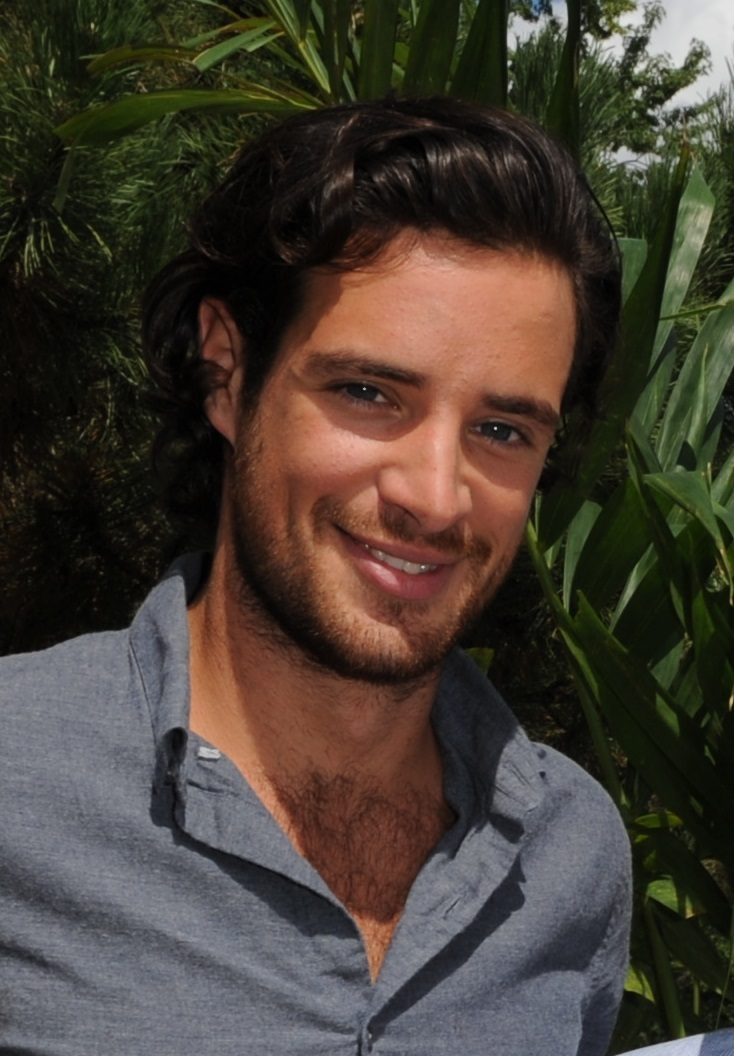
- Carrick in 2012
- Born: Newcastle upon Tyne, England
- Education: Vancouver Film School
- Years active: 2008–present

Charles Ben D. Carrick is an English actor. He made his feature film debut in Molly Maxwell (2013). In 2016, he won a Leo Award for his performance in the film The Devout (2015).

== Early life ==
Carrick was born in Newcastle upon Tyne, and grew up in the suburb of Jesmond. He attended the Royal Grammar School. He was 13 when he discovered acting through a school production of A Midsummer Night's Dream. After completing his A Levels, Carrick worked at a local bar for six months to save up for his studies at the Vancouver Film School, graduating in 2006. He was inspired by his grandfather, who temporarily worked in Canada; Carrick's mother had been born in Montreal before the family returned to Tyneside.

== Personal life ==
As of 2017, Carrick and his wife Nina live in London and Guelph.

Outside of his acting career, Carrick is an avid football player and fan, possessing an encyclopedic knowledge of 1990s English football. He has noted that he frequently plays recreationally to stay in shape.

== Filmography ==
=== Film ===
Year	Title	Role	Notes
2012	Seconds	Narrator (voice)	Short film
2013	Molly Maxwell	Ben Carter	
2014	Ally Was Screaming	Nole	
2015	Eadweard	Harry Larkyns	
2015	The Devout	Darryl	
2017	She Came Knocking	Unknown	Short film
2017	Trench 11	Dr. Priest	
2017	Salty	Darcy	Short film
2017	Purl	Adam	Short film
2018	Angelique's Isle	Charlie Mott	
2019	Held for Ransom	Michael Foley	
2021	The Power	Franklyn	
2021	The Wolf and the Lion	Eli	
2022	Alice, Darling	Simon	
2024	The Apprentice	Fred Trump Jr.	
2025	The Royal We	Crown Prince Desmond	

=== Television ===
Year	Title	Role	Notes
2008	The L Word	Waiter	1 episode
2010	Supernatural	Robert	1 episode
2010	Tower Prep	Fenton Capwell	4 episodes
2011	V	Rafael Mendoza	2 episodes
2011	Psych	Colin Hennessey	1 episode
2011	Sanctuary	Tyler	1 episode
2012	Flashpoint	David	1 episode
2013	The Borgias	Pascal	4 episodes
2013	Holidaze	Derek	TV movie
2014	Motive	Steve	1 episode
2013–2014	Cedar Cove	John Bowman	9 episodes
2015–2016	Reign	Robert Dudley	17 episodes
2017	Incorporated	Unknown	1 episode
2017	Woman of the House	Kent	TV movie
2018	Frankie Drake Mysteries	John Smith	1 episode
2018	Genius	Manuel Pallarès	2 episodes
2019	Deep Water	Winston Hill/Winstone Toovey	6 episodes
2020	COBRA	Scott Minett	2 episodes
2021	Departure	Richard Bright	6 episodes
2022	Hudson & Rex	Dr. Alan Vane	1 episode
2021–2023	Hidden Assets	James Melnick	11 episodes
2025	We Were Liars	Sam Eastman	Supporting role
2025	The Copenhagen Test	Oliver	1 episode
2026	The Testaments	Commander Judd	5 episodes
