= The End (2007 Canadian film) =

- Film poster
- Directed by: Jeremy Thomas
- Written by: Jeremy Thomas
- Produced by: Charlie Ross (executive producer); Colin Sheldon (uncredited)
- Starring: Jeremy Thomas; Ella B. May; Katie Webber; Darren MacDonald
- Cinematography: Dan Dumouchel; Colin Sheldon
- Music by: Christiaan Venter; Nova Pon
- Production companies: Gravemarker Films; Perfect Pictures
- Distributed by: Angerman Distribution
- Release date: 24 September 2007 (Calgary)
- Running time: 108 minutes
- Country: Canada
- Language: English

The End is a 2007 Canadian dark comedy thriller horror film written and directed by Jeremy Thomas, who also stars in the film. Thomas himself called his first feature a "lighthearted existential horror film", while four festival reviewers described it in neo-noir terms. Having won over critics, and an award from the Eugene International Film Festival, Thomas was able to attract investors for his next project, Ally Was Screaming.

== Synopsis ==
Sixteen years ago, a teenage Joseph Rickman (Jeremy Thomas) found a missing girl on sheer intuition, seeing something that others could not. Rickman, now a charismatic schoolteacher, has since come to the conclusion that everything in life has been predetermined, including his own life, and can point to many signs which appear to suggest, if not confirm, it. He tries to explain himself to those close to him, who treat him as though he may be developing paranoid schizophrenia, as his father did many years ago. An exception to this response is an adoring student, Katie (Katie Webber), who seems to share some of his psychic abilities. Even so, sometimes he, too, thinks he is losing his mind. As his mental state deteriorates, he has a growing sense of dread.

Feeling compelled to walk into the woods one night, he sees a robed, limping man in a tragedy mask and images of people being kidnapped and buried alive as strange little beings look on. A stranger in strange clothing has, in fact, been seen lurking in the dark streets of town at about the times when people have been inexplicably disappearing. Confiding in his longtime friend, Detective Clara Wilkie (Ella B. May), the pair becomes convinced that what he has seen are visionary premonitions, and they work on the case together, which involves not only multiple kidnappings but also serial murder. Tensions increase between them as they spend more time together, and as her feelings for Rickman grow, she is increasingly concerned about his mounting obsession as the case edges delicately towards a bizarre and shocking conclusion.

== Cast ==
- Jeremy Thomas as Joseph Rickman
- Ella B. May as Clara Wilkie
- Katie Webber as Katie
- Darren MacDonald as The Figure • Lobotomized Man • Activator Scientist

== Production ==
=== Background and filming ===
Before shooting his first feature film, Jeremy Thomas had made short films as a student at the University of Calgary, where he joined the campus station NUTV to use the equipment, just as director Michael Dowse was leaving. The End was shot on video.

=== Financing ===
A low-budget film, The End was largely self-financed, though it did receive support from the National Film Board's Filmmaker Assistance Program. At the 2008 Fantasia International Film Festival, Thomas was apparently apologetic about the film, offering what seemed like "excuses or explanations – they had less money than the short film that precedes it, but it is long for a zero-budget indie," among other details.

== Release ==
The End had its premiere at the Calgary International Film Festival on 24 September 2007. Its American premiere was at the 2008 Cinequest Film Festival, an official selection. The film was also screened at Fantasia, the Edmonton International Film Festival, the Eugene International Film Festival (where it won an award), and the International Film Festival of England.

=== Home media and streaming ===
The End is available on DVD and for streaming from IndiePlaya.

== Reception ==
By coming at the tropes of the film noir from an entirely unexpected angle, Jeremy Thomas fashions an audacious debut feature shot through with bitter laughter, pulling the strings of myriad contradictory emotions with a blend of uncanny hallucinatory visions, gripping and tightly executed action scenes, and side-splitting moments of absurdist comedy. ... Thomas leads us into a realm of the delirious where the standard rules of film narrative are shattered (and surprises us by handing the lead role to himself, a bravura turn both nuanced and highly theatrical, a magnificent reflection of his character's renegade psyche).

— Simon Laperrière

=== Critical response ===
The End generally received "great" reviews at film festivals and led to Thomas attracting producers for his next film, Ally Was Screaming. Appreciative critics were "tying themselves in knots not to reveal its mid-plot twist."

Simon Laperrière calls the film a "stunning appearance on the landscape of DIY cinema", a "gobsmacking cross" between Charlie Kaufman and William Shakespeare, and "unquestionably the most original Canadian film of the year." Pam Kelly, writing for the Edmonton Sun, agreed, suggesting that if Woody Allen, David Lynch and M. Night Shyamalan ever had a "forbidden love child," it may "look something like The End, a wolf in sheep's clothing that looks and feels like a modern noir, but ... which burns in flames any conventional relationship an audience has with fictional cinema."

Thomas has created a notably insightful and thought-provoking piece of work that is intricate and employs numerous twists and surprises, serving up continuous adventure using equal parts horror, drama, thriller, and mystery. This clever and refreshing film will have you utterly compelled right up to its artfully unexpected conclusion.

Praising the acting and the film's originality, Mike Phalin said it "is a prime example of how ingenuity prevails in the face of obvious budgetary restraints"; a "pleasant surprise" and "an inspiration ... to the low budget/do-it-yourself filmmaking community." The first half of the film has "charm", and then "turns the screws on the viewers in a highly unexpected way."

For the first half hour or so you will be wondering why you're bothering to persist with the film; it's far from terrible but far from great either, but then it plays its trump card and from that moment on every scene is played out in such a way as to make it consistent, top-notch entertainment.

— Kevin Matthews

Kevin Matthews avers The End "cannot be explained... It must be shown." It is difficult "to discuss any of the storyline's developments or the main plus points", because to do so would be "to ruin a sublime, surreal, cinematic joy." The film is "intelligent, often humorous", and "manages to both touch on themes that have been used effectively elsewhere and to provide something completely new to film fans."

Jay Seaver finds the opening of the film "kind of clunky", but notes that it has "one of the rare mid-thriller twists that makes the movie funnier rather than more grim." Thomas cleverly lays out some of the ideas he's going to be playing with early, and seems to have fun elaborating on his plot twist, "finding new ways to push things just a bit further as the movie goes on." As for the acting:

Thomas isn't bad at all. At times, he seems a little artificial, but at others he seems real in an "I'd probably be a bit awkward in this situation, too" manner. Ella May is much the same, and the two of them are fun to watch together. It's a bit of a step down to the supporting characters, but it's a lot less painful than it is in other low-budget independents, because Thomas has done a good job of working around his limitations. It would be nice if the very end of the movie worked a bit better. It's clever, but somewhat underwhelming considering the build-up to it. Still, Jeremy Thomas has managed to make something nifty out of not very much in the way of resources.

=== Accolade ===
- Best Horror/Sci-Fi Feature, Eugene International Film Festival (Eugene, Oregon, 2018)
