= Grant Gee =

English film director (born 1964)

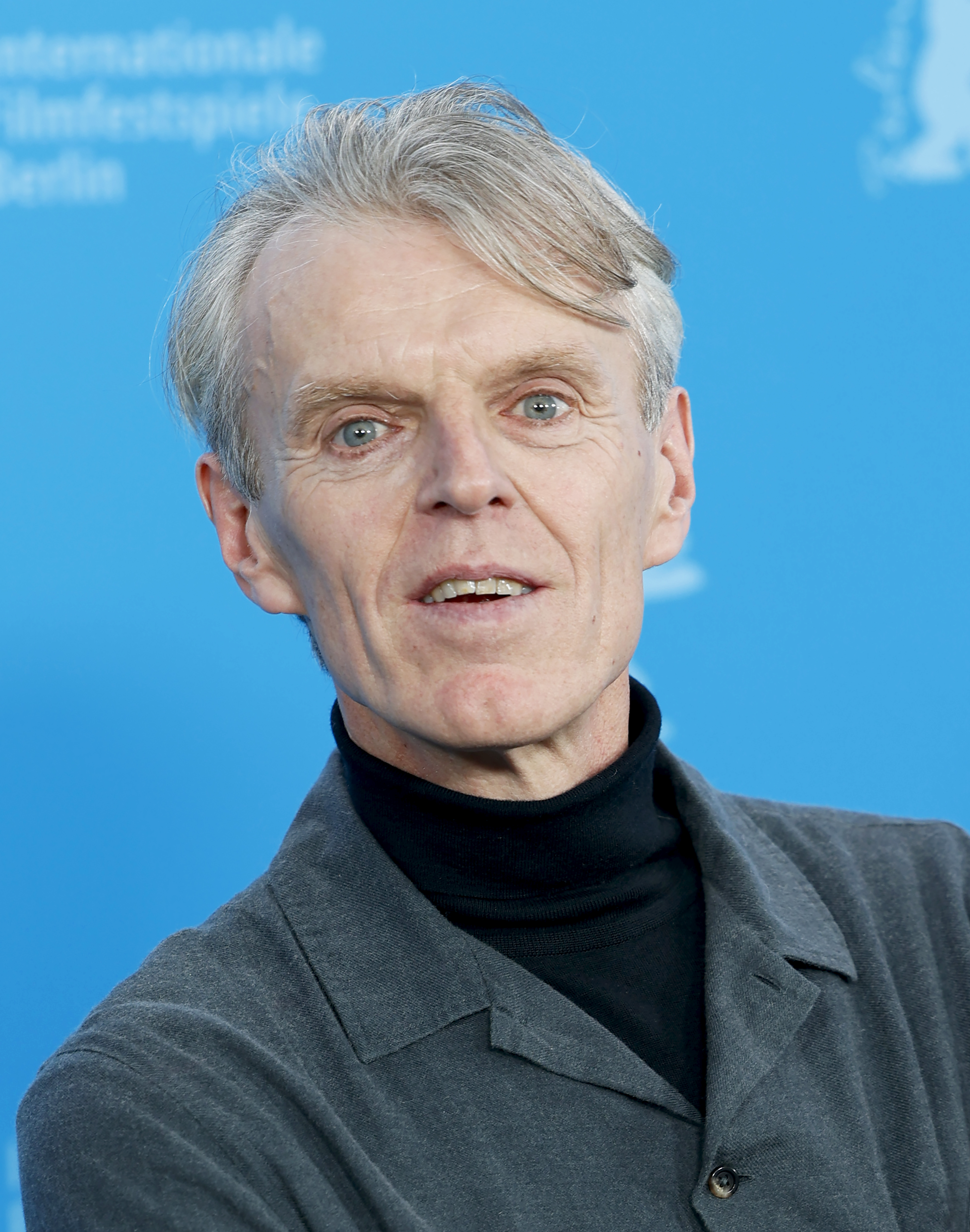
- Gee in 2026
- Born: Grant Robert Gee; 1 November 1964 (age 61); Plymouth, Devon, England
- Education: St Catherine's College, Oxford; University of Illinois at Urbana–Champaign
- Occupations: Film director Cinematographer
- Years active: 1989–present

Grant Robert Gee (born 1 November 1964) is an English film director, photographer and cinematographer. He is most noted for his 1998 documentary Meeting People Is Easy about the British alternative rock group Radiohead.

== Early life ==
Grant Robert Gee was born on 1 November 1964 in Plymouth, Devon, and studied Geography at St Catherine's College, Oxford. He did postgraduate study at University of Illinois at Urbana–Champaign.

== Career ==
In the early 1990s, Gee worked on U2's Zoo TV and Zoo Radio, and collaborated with Mark Neale on several projects (many through London production company Kudos Productions), including "The Memory Palace", an experimental multi-media project combining film and live performance for the Expo '92.

In 1996, he directed a 27-minute short film commissioned by progressive house band Spooky for parts of their album Found Sound (namely the tracks "Central Heating", "Bamboo", "Aphonia", "Lowest Common Denominator", "Hypo-Allergenic"/"Interim"). The film was displayed on a continuous loop outside the Centre Georges Pompidou as part of its re-opening.

Gee followed the band Radiohead while they were on tour for their highly acclaimed 1997 album OK Computer. Gee's 1998 documentary of the tour, Meeting People Is Easy, was nominated for a Grammy award for Best Long Form Music Video.

His short films – including Tel Aviv City Symphony (commissioned by onedotzero), the documentary JC-03 (about John Cale at work) and the dance film Torsion (choreographed by Russell Maliphant) – have been shown internationally as part of touring packages by the British Council, onedotzero and Film and Video Umbrella. Gee has also made music videos for British bands including Radiohead and Blur.

In April 2006 the Creative Commons-licensed film project A Swarm of Angels announced that Gee has joined the project team as Director of Photography. In 2007, he made Western Lands, a 10-minute film about climbing the Old Man of Hoy. In November 2010, Grant received funding from the UK Film Council to develop the project New Career in a New Town: David Bowie in Berlin, a music documentary on David Bowie's Berlin period.

Gee's 2007 documentary, Joy Division, told the story of the eponymous Manchester band and was made in collaboration with writer Jon Savage. The film received generally positive reviews from critics. In Variety, Robert Koehler wrote that the documentary was "emotionally deeper" than the biopic directed by Anton Corbijn, Control.

In January 2011, Gee completed his film Patience: After Sebald based on W. G. Sebald's book The Rings of Saturn, which was accepted by the Vancouver International Film Festival and the New York Film Festival. In The Observer, critic Philip French called it a "modest, immensely enjoyable documentary".

In 2015, Gee's documentary film Innocence of Memories, made in collaboration with Turkish novelist Orhan Pamuk and based on his novel The Museum of Innocence, was screened as a special event in the Venice Days section at the 72nd Venice International Film Festival.

In 2026, Gee’s biographical drama film Everybody Digs Bill Evans, based on Owen Martell’s novel Intermission and centred on jazz pianist Bill Evans (played by Anders Danielsen Lie), premiered in the main competition of the Berlin International Film Festival, where it won the Silver Bear for Best Director.

== Filmography ==
=== Feature films ===
Year	Title	Role	Notes
1998	Meeting People Is Easy	Director	
2007	Joy Division	Director	
2012	Patience: After Sebald	Director	
2015	Innocence of Memories	Director	Also served as cinematographer
2020	Judith	Director	
2022	The Gold Machine	Director	
2026	Everybody Digs Bill Evans	Director	Narrative feature

=== Short films and television ===
Year	Title	Role	Notes
2003	Tel Aviv City Symphony	Director	Short film
2003	Jc-03	Director	Short film; also cinematographer and editor
2009	Bang Goes the Theory Live Trailer	Director	Television short
2009	Haikus of the Heart	Director	Short film
2012	Making First Steps	Director	Television short
2012	Patience	Director	Short film; also cinematographer and editor
