= Joy Division (2007 film) =

- British release poster
- Directed by: Grant Gee
- Written by: Jon Savage
- Produced by: Tom Astor; Tom Atencio; Jacqui Edenbrow
- Starring: Bernard Sumner; Peter Hook; Stephen Morris; Peter Saville; Tony Wilson
- Cinematography: Grant Gee
- Edited by: Jerry Chater
- Music by: Joy Division
- Distributed by: Universal Pictures
- Release date: 2007
- Running time: 93 minutes
- Country: United Kingdom
- Language: English

Joy Division is a 2007 British documentary film about the British post-punk band Joy Division, directed by Grant Gee. It was written by Jon Savage.

== Premise ==
The film assembles TV clips, newsreel, pictures of late 1970s and modern Manchester, and interviews. The interviewees include the three surviving members of the band, as well as Tony Wilson, Peter Saville, Pete Shelley (of Buzzcocks), Genesis Breyer P-Orridge (of Throbbing Gristle), Alan Hempsall (of Crispy Ambulance), Paul Morley, Terry Mason, Richard Boon, Anton Corbijn, and Belgian journalist Annik Honoré, with whom Ian Curtis was having an affair.

== Reception ==
Film critic Philip French wrote in The Guardian: "Someone, Wilson I think, says in the film that the revolutionary step they made was to progress from the usual punk group's angry statement: 'Fuck you.' Joy Division were the first to say: 'We're fucked.' ... There is a particularly impressive sequence in which dark, despairing tracks of urban alienation and angst from the 1979 album Unknown Pleasures are accompanied by a speeded-up nocturnal journey around Manchester. It has the hallucinatory sci-fi feeling of Jean-Luc Godard's Alphaville."

Also in The Guardian, Dave Simpson wrote: "This is a very powerful and moving film that perhaps goes deeper than Control in exploring the full reasons for Curtis's suicide – much more is made of the effects of the medication he was on for epilepsy, and resulting mental state, than Control's simpler, more cinema-friendly emphasis on a difficult love triangle. That's not to say it's better than Control. There are one or two bits of sluggish editing and a tiny mistake ... But it's different. There are no actors or recreations. There are no twists for dramatic effect. It's all vividly real."

In Uncut Stephen Trousse gave the film 2/5 stars, writing: "Gee’s direction is always toying with continuity – messing with the flow of film the way producer Martin Hannett did with the band’s sound. Time speeds up and slows down; the TV career of Tony Wilson or the road tales of Hooky’n’Barney are cut-up into bad-dream blasts. ... Savage’s assiduous historical scholarship has brought some fantastic old footage to light. ... The film also buys in a little too much to the Wilsonian myth of the civic revival of Manchester being inspired by Joy Division – an idea that looks increasingly flimsy as those loft-style city centre apartments are repossessed and the credit goes bad. But these are quibbles. For the most part, Joy Division is a resounding, absorbing success."

Anna Smith in Empire wrote: "The success of Control created the perfect climate for this documentary – but then again, Joy Division fans would have leapt on it any time. Charting the rise of the band from its humble beginnings in urban Manchester, it hinges around vintage footage and entertaining anecdotes from Bernard Sumner, Peter Hook and Stephen Morris within a slick, visually inventive format. Other contributors include the late Tony Wilson, Control director Anton Corbijn and Annik Honoré, who’s relatively guarded in her first filmed interview about lover Ian Curtis. The New Order boys are more frank, Sumner recalling how he sat down and finished his Sunday lunch after he got the call about Curtis’ suicide. Newfound audio recordings help make this more revealing, if less affecting, than the drama that preceded it."

On review aggregator website Rotten Tomatoes, the film holds an approval rating of 100% based on 5 reviews, with an average rating of 8.5/10.
