= Christy Morrissey =

Canadian ecotoxicologist

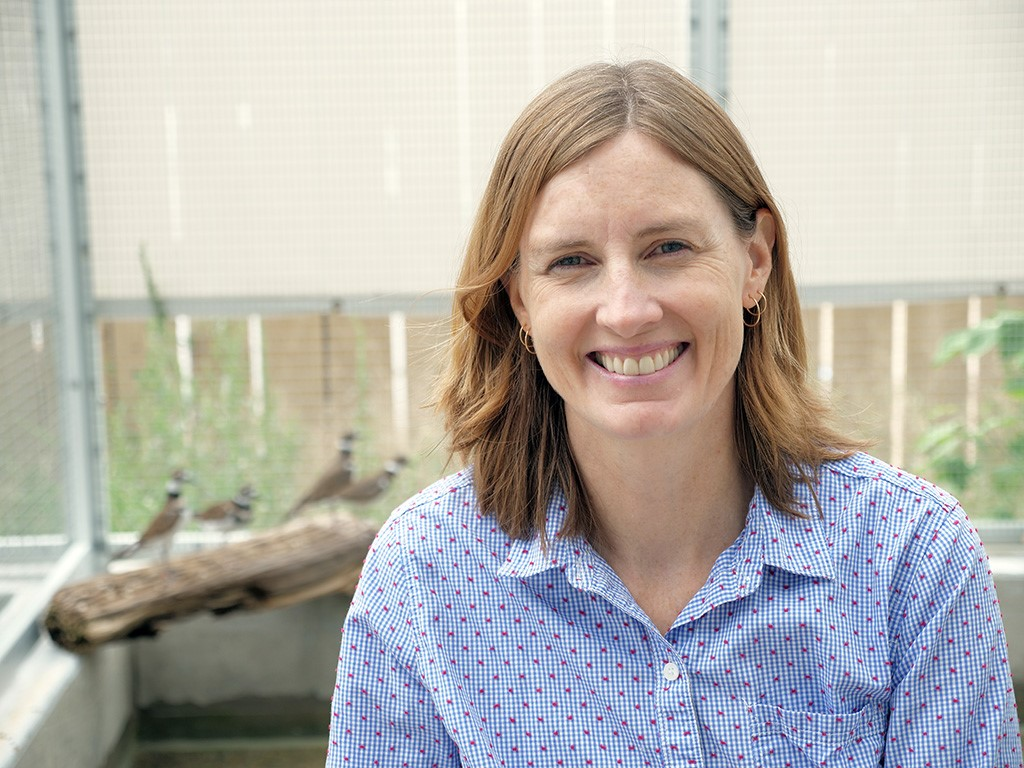
- Morrissey in 2020
- Born: Vancouver, British Columbia, Canada

Academic background
- Education: BA, zoology, 1997, University of British Columbia; PhD, biological sciences, 2003, Simon Fraser University
- Thesis: The ecological and toxicological significance of altitudinal migration by the American dipper (Cinclus mexicanus) (2003)

Academic work
- Institutions: University of Saskatchewan
- Main interests: Avian and aquatic ecotoxicology
- Website: christymorrissey.wixsite.com/morrisseylab/bio

Christy Ann Morrissey FRSC is a Canadian ecotoxicologist. She is a Professor of biology at the University of Saskatchewan and was elected to the Royal Society of Canada's College of New Scholars, Artists and Scientists.

== Early life and education ==
Morrissey was born and raised in Vancouver, British Columbia, where she envisioned becoming a veterinarian. While attending the University of British Columbia, she was inspired by ornithologist Jamie Smith to pursue a career in wildlife. Following graduation, she volunteered for the Canadian Wildlife Service to study raptors and carbamates, which was the basis of her PhD at Simon Fraser University.

== Career ==
Morrissey joined the faculty at the University of Saskatchewan (U of S) in 2010 as a professor of biology in their College of Arts and Science and the School of Environment and Sustainability. During her early years at U of S, she began to study neonicotinoids, a type of insecticide, upon the advice of research scientist Pierre Mineau. Morrissey subsequently found that neonicotinoids were being increasingly used on crops in Western Canada, which then had detrimental effects on insects and birds. Her research was also featured in the 2015 documentary The Messenger which focused on the protection of multiple types of songbirds throughout the world. However, Mark Hanson of the University of Manitoba said her research was theoretical and lacked science to prove her hypothesis and Ray McAllister of CropLife America said "the levels are well below those of concern established by EPA." In response, Morrissey argued that the EPA guidelines were too high and out of date.

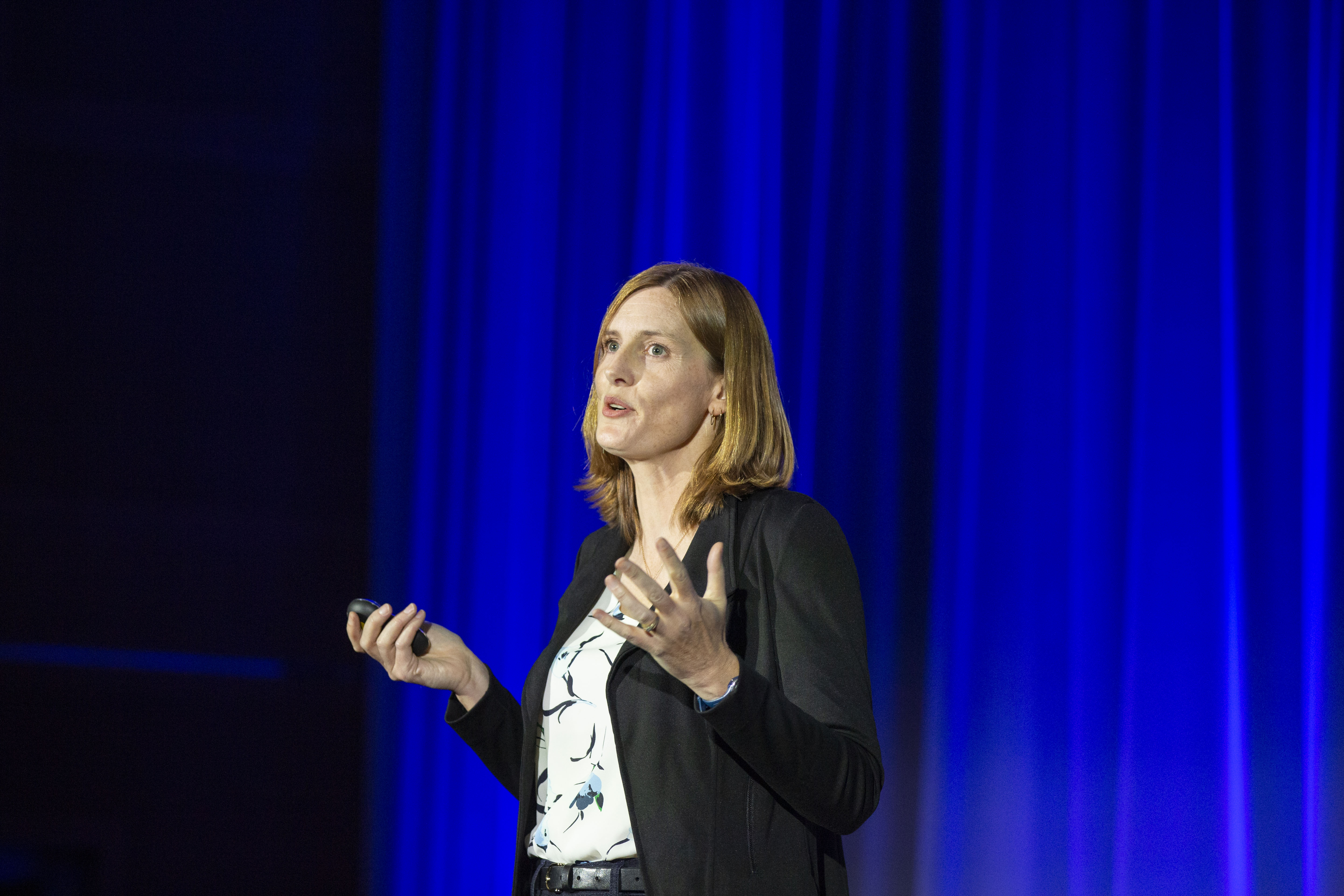
Morrissey speaking at TEDxUSask in 2019

While simultaneously studying neonicotinoids, Morrissey also conducted research at Chaplin Lake studying the migratory shorebirds there. With funding from the U of S, she began recruiting and training locals of Chaplin, Saskatchewan, to gather data on the birds. Alongside a graduate student, she studied how heavy industrial pollutants affected how shorebirds migrated from South America to the Arctic. By 2016, Morrissey was the principal applicant for U of S' Facility for Applied Avian Research, one of two such facilities in Canada capable of advanced research on birds.

In 2019, Morrissey published data that one type of neonicotinoid causes sparrows to lose weight and delay migration. In the first study to combine field and lab work, she captured white-crowned sparrows in the spring and tried to mimic the amount of the pesticide the birds might naturally encounter. While the birds did not originally seem sick, they ended up losing six per cent of their body weight over six hours and ate up to 70 per cent less. As a result, she openly criticized the EPAs approval of sulfoxaflor as an alternative pesticide by saying it "lingers a long time in water bodies, exposing aquatic insects to low but long-term doses of the chemical." Overall, Morrissey's research showed that 500 million boreal forest birds have been lost since 1970, a 33 per cent decline in populations. In an effort to combat neonicotinoids, she formed the Canadian Prairie Agroecosystem Resilience Network with 30 university researchers, nine international organizations, and more than 30 partners from government, non-government agencies, agriculture industry groups and First Nations.

In 2020, Morrissey was elected to the Royal Society of Canada's College of New Scholars, Artists and Scientists.
