= Ally Was Screaming =

2014 Canadian dark comedy-thriller film

- Directed by: Jeremy Thomas
- Written by: Jeremy Thomas
- Produced by: Colin Sheldon; Robert Cuffley (executive producer); Dan Dumouchel (co-producer)
- Starring: Camille Sullivan; Charlie Carrick; Giacomo Baessato; Arielle Rombough; Niall Matter
- Cinematography: Dan Dumouchel
- Edited by: Jeremy Thomas; Neshe Delici
- Production company: Perfect Pictures Inc.
- Distributed by: Pacific Northwest Pictures
- Release dates: 28 September 2014 (CIFF); 6 November 2015 (Canada)
- Running time: 88 minutes
- Country: Canada
- Language: English

Ally was Screaming is a 2014 Canadian dark comedy-thriller film written and directed by Jeremy Thomas, as well as his second feature film. The film explores the psychological and moral ramifications of "doing a bad thing in order to achieve a good result". Two men (Charlie Carrick and Giacomo Baessato) grieving for their best friend (Arielle Rombough) discover her winning lottery ticket. The men try to figure out how they can keep it, at first fantasizing, then actually debating, and finally plotting to murder the executrix of Ally's estate, her sister (Camille Sullivan), who otherwise would allow the winnings to go to their dead friend's abusive husband.

Shot in Calgary, where it also had its premiere as the closing gala film at the Calgary International Film Festival, the film features music performed by the Calgary Civic Symphony. It has received favourable reviews from critics.

== Plot ==
Seth and Nole have just lost their best friend Ally in a house fire. She was in the process of breaking up with her abusive husband, who is serving time in prison. Her estate is being looked after by her older sister Casey, who will follow Ally's will exactly as written, which means everything goes to the estranged husband. Among Ally's effects, Seth and Nole find a lottery ticket worth $30 million. If they tell Casey about the ticket, the money will go to a wife-beater whom Ally was about to abandon rather than those more deserving - themselves, but also Ally's charity. They cannot pass it off as their own ticket, as it is covered in Ally's characteristic doodles. The solution is obvious: sacrifice one life, Casey's, to save thousands: "If we give a third of the money to an African charity, it'll be like we're saving 40,000 lives just for sacrificing one." Both agree that they cannot possibly commit murder, but find it amusing to consider the possibility, and how it could be done perfectly.

Seth and Nole start to scheme, jokingly at first, but eventually they "get real," concluding that murdering Casey is, paradoxically, the "right thing". Seeking unwitting permission from Casey herself, they ask her if she would give up her life if it meant saving thousands of other lives; she answers: "In a heartbeat." Accepting that they will live with the burden of guilt for sacrificing an innocent person, even for good reasons, for the rest of their lives, they come up with a plan so that Casey dies with little or no suffering, one of them distracting her with a story about Ally while the other moves in for the kill. As part of the plan, they invite her over regularly, entertaining and getting to know her as they did Ally. They practice and make a few aborted attempts, but each time the one who must do the deed fails to go through with it, unable to find it in himself to commit the murder. The longer it goes on, the more they get to know her, and the more difficult the task becomes.

From time to time, the pair also have to put up with Andrew, their overbearing boss, who owns a factory farm. He graphically describes the killing of terrified pigs, which upsets them, partly because they both eat meat. Later, when his farm has been the target of animal rights activists, he shares video of pigs in the slaughterhouse which horrifies them even more.

One day, Casey reveals that she is dying of ovarian cancer, so the pair think do not need to go through with the plan. But in fact, there is a time limit on turning in the lottery ticket, so it leaves them no better off. Moreover, it provides another justification as it turns the murder into a form of mercy killing: they can spare her a slow, agonizing death, killing her quickly, listening to her favourite piece of music, in the company of people who love her, her two new best friends. On the chosen night, everything having gone according to plan, at the last moment they try to give Casey (and themselves) a way out, telling her about the lottery ticket, pleading with her not to let it go to Ally's charity: "Is it possible that what is right isn't what you thought it was?" She considers, but seems unlikely to concede, her two friends and would-be murderers visibly conflicted and in emotional turmoil.

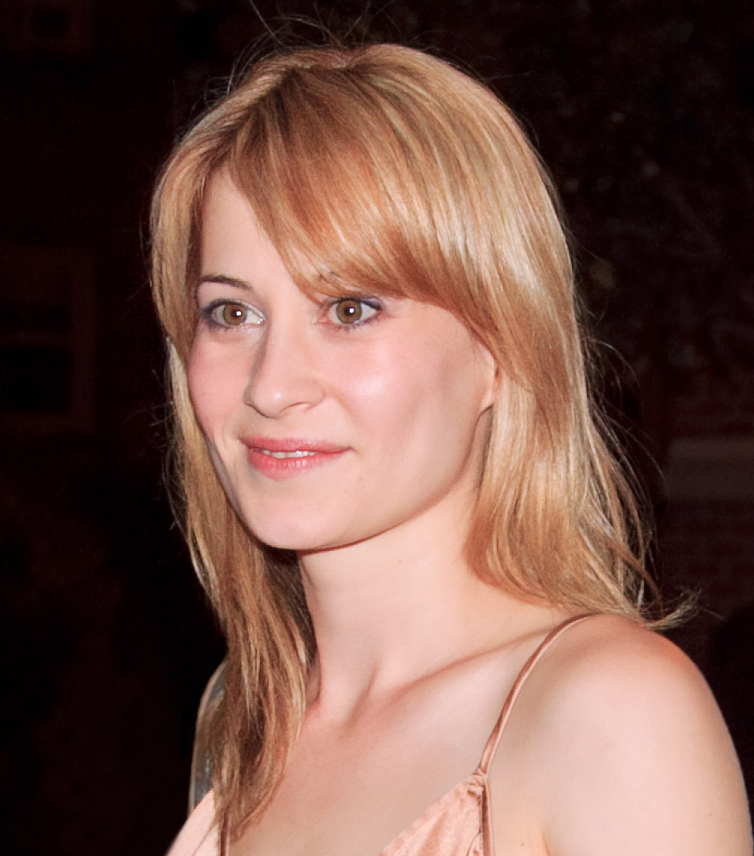
Camille Sullivan at TIFF, September 2011

After a fade to black, it is revealed that Seth and Nole did not commit the murder, but the lottery winnings did go to Ally's charity. But as the pair mull things over in a restaurant, the vegan meal having been paid for by Andrew, they do not celebrate the turn of events as some kind of triumph of their own morality or ethics; rather: "We didn't do the right thing; the right thing happened to us."

== Cast ==
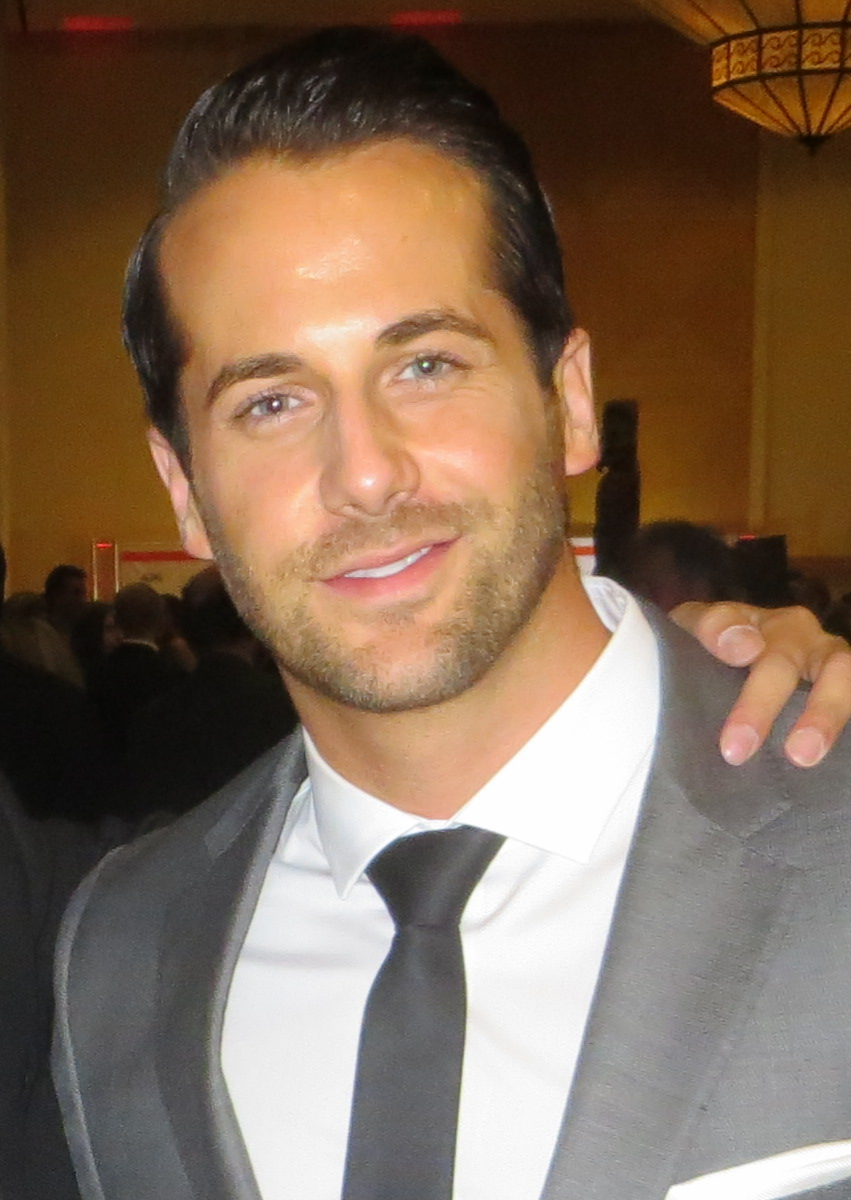
Niall Matter at the Leo Awards in July 2013

- Camille Sullivan as Casey
- Charlie Carrick as Nole
- Giacomo Baessato as Seth
- Arielle Rombough as Ally
- Niall Matter as Andrew

== Themes and influences ==
Jeremy Thomas has remarked that a lot of films are about "how if you do good and you do right you will be rewarded with happiness", while those who do wrong, the "bad guys, will somehow get some sort of karmic punishment."

If I can boil Ally Was Screaming down to a concept that I found compelling enough to make a movie, it's that goodness is not rewarded by happiness. Some people might interpret that as saying "Well, why be good?" But goodness is still worth it. That's why, for me, it's also an optimistic movie.

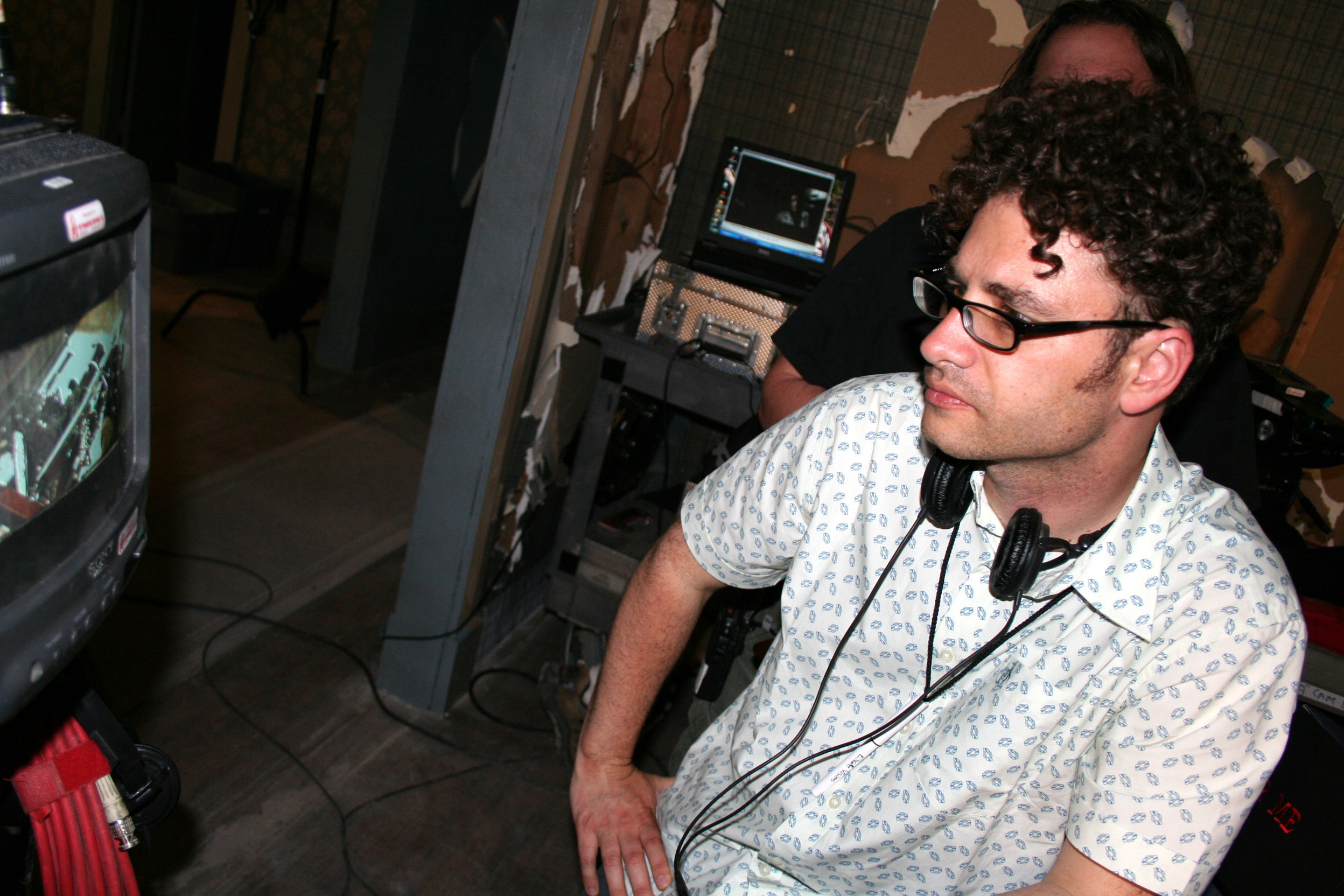
Executive producer Robert Cuffley was a major inspiration for Jeremy Thomas.

In an interview on the Calgary-based Why We See Movies podcast, Thomas contrasts his film with John Houston's Treasure of the Sierra Madre: whereas that film is about how far greed may drive someone, Ally Was Screaming is different in that Seth and Nole's rationalizations of their actions are so good that "they might be right"; they make "a very compelling argument", one of them even says he will give away his entire share to charity, showing his own motivation is ultimately not selfish. When asked if this is like Robin Hood taking from the rich to give to the poor, Thomas answered: "In a way, yes," and asserted that the film "asks very difficult moral questions." Thomas went on to discuss his theory that audiences "read" movies on a meta level: they are interested in whether the film asserts something culturally, and the most interesting films ask about questions about where the culture is going.

Thomas cites Frank Capra's It's a Wonderful Life as one of his favourite movies and claims to be the biggest collector of the film's memorabilia in Western Canada. He thinks about films such as this and Treasure of the Sierra Madre, films with a lot of character, when writing. His older contemporary, Robert Cuffley, the executive producer of Ally Was Screaming, was a major inspiration for Thomas when he saw Cuffley's debut feature, Walk All Over Me, at the Calgary International Film Festival.

== Production ==
=== Financing ===
The End, the last largely self-financed film made by Thomas and his first feature film, did well at film festivals and got "great" reviews, thereby earning the trust of producers for his next film. Ally Was Screaming was produced with the assistance of the Government of Alberta, Alberta Media Fund, and the participation of Telefilm Canada. Additional support was provided through the Government of Canada film and video tax credit, and by the ACTRA membership. Finally, the filmmakers raised an additional US$6,080 through crowdfunding website Indiegogo.

=== Writing and development ===
Working from a small budget, Thomas had to produce something "feasible", so he wrote a script that was purposefully introspective with a small number of characters. "What you don't have in spectacle, you have to have in sensibility, and you have to have in interesting ideas." Unlike most writers, Thomas does not send a script out to be read; instead, he does a "test telling", sitting down with a potential producer, actor, or other interested party, and he reads it aloud, acting out the various parts, even playing music appropriate to the scene, as Walt Disney used to do when his films were in development. Thomas thinks screenplays are actually a poor blueprint for movies. By performing the scene, he is better able to get across his ideas than if he "cluttered up" the script with stage directions.

Some fifty or more titles were suggested before Ally Was Screaming was finally accepted as the most compelling, despite how the title could make it "sound like an exploitative horror flick." One of the titles Jeremy Thomas suggested was Why Saints Look Sad and Devils Look Happy, from a line of dialogue between Nole and Seth.

=== Casting and crew ===
First day auditions for Ally Was Screaming were held in Vancouver on 19 September 2013 and in Calgary on 27 September 2013. Thomas later said it was "unfortunate" that the actors chosen were all so "good-looking"; he had wanted "normal guys".

As this was his first externally budgeted film, it was important to Telefilm Canada that the project had a "very strong" crew. To ensure this, Tom Benz was brought in as the production manager; he had been production manager for Brokeback Mountain. The result was "extremely intimidating" for Thomas, who felt that while he was "in charge" as the director, he was also the least experienced person on the set: "You can't bluff your way out of an experience like that, where the second camera assistant ... has been on more sets than the director. They were just patient with me." On the first day of filming, Thomas was so overwhelmed by the number of crew and the amount of equipment that when someone said "rollling", he looked around at the silent room and did not realize at first that he had to say "action" before anything else happened.

=== Filming ===
Ally Was Screaming was shot mainly over two weeks in November 2013, using various locations in Calgary, including Arbour Lake, Mayland Heights and Crescent Heights. Principal photography took place between 1 and 17 November, but due to exceessive snow in Calgary, some shots with Charlie Carrick and Giacomo Baessato had to be filmed in Vancouver on 29 November. The pig factory farm footage was provided by PETA according to the film credits.

A director has the option of watching the action as it unfolds before his eyes or from a monitor. In the Why We See Movies interview, Thomas said he is very "pro-monitor" (as opposed to Quentin Tarantino, who is against using the monitor), because "that is what the audience sees". Emulating Alfred Hitchcock, Thomas is also very strongly in favour of planning and storyboarding "to the frame", as opposed to "making it up" on the set. Of course, sometimes filming does not go exactly as planned and Thomas took advice from the "wise" Dan Dumouchel on matters of cinematography, and sometimes the actors would bring things up, as when Charlie Carrick decided his character should be sitting on a table rather than a couch in one scene, "because I want to be that intimate" with one of the performers, and Thomas could see that he was right. Other times, Thomas would have the scene shot two different ways and decide on it later.

== Release ==
Ally Was Screaming had its premiere as the closing gala film at the Calgary International Film Festival, at the Theatre Junction Grand. According to Camille Sullivan, who was in attendance as a guest of the Festival, it was a "packed house and the movie got a great reception." Not long after, it was screened of at the Whistler Film Festival at Village 8 Cinema on 5 December 2014. The film was selected as one of eight Canadian films for the fifth Beijing International Film Festival, which ran from 16 to 23 April 2015.

=== Distribution ===
In 2015, Pacific Northwest Pictures acquired the Canadian distribution rights to Ally Was Screaming, which was released in theatres on 6 November 2015 at Toronto's Carlton Theatre. Limited engagements followed at the Metro Film Society in Edmonton on 13 November and the Globe Cinema in Calgary on 16 November. It played in Vancouver at the Rio Theatre on 7 February 2016.

==== Streaming ====
Ally Was Screaming is available for streaming on Netflix and iTunes.

== Reception ==
=== Critical response ===
Overall, reviews have been "very strong". Eric Volmers calls Ally Was Screaming an "intriguing, expertly constructed morality tale," while Adrian Mack says it "toys pretty expertly with your expectations right until its last shot." Pia Chamberlain describes the film as by turns "hilariously funny and darkly suspenseful", a "sly, intelligent drama" that "sneaks up on you and won't let you go."

Writing for The Globe and Mail, Brad Wheeler gives the film 3.5 stars out of 4. While the film is not a true thriller or dark comedy as billed, "it does raise important issues about human behaviour, in a subtly operatic way", finding the film's major flaw is that "the horrific solution Nole and Seth conceive of never seems honest to their characters. But the question they ask – "Is it possible that what's right isn't what you thought it was?" – is just the provocative ticket." Chris Knight, writing for The National Post, assigns the film 3 stars out of 4, praising the actors "all around", and the "smart, talky screenplay ... we're never sure until the final scenes what the characters are going to do; clearly, neither are they. The suspense makes the 88-minute running time seem at least 20 minutes longer (in a good way), as laughs and horror balance on a knife edge."

Norman Wilner also calls the film "talky," but suggests the film has "more circular conversations than might be strictly necessary, and a late plot twist that feels like Thomas just wants to complicate his thought experiment", but praises Sullivan, Carrick, and Baessato equally: "all three actors are solid and even if Ally Was Screaming occasionally feels like a short film that doesn't know when to stop, I was always curious to see what happened next." Writing for Exclaim!, Robert Bell assigns the film 3 stars, calling it an "above-average Canadian feature". Aesthetically, it looks like an episode of Corner Gas as directed by Vincenzo Natali; less a noir than a psychological character drama about rationalizing abject behaviour, "adding a very shrewdly considered layer of dialogue about the motivations behind philanthropy."

What's crucial here, and reiterated throughout the many long discussions about how to handle the situation, is the way people rationalize and justify their self-serving behaviour. How these discussions and topics are addressed and analyzed is Ally Was Screaming's saving grace. The film's depiction of how its characters choose between the wishes of a dead friend and servicing their own short-and-long-term needs suggests that this low-key Canadian art film understands human nature well.

The film struggles, however, in servicing the "basic demands of a story": Seth and Nole are interchangeable, while their abrasive, "borderline psychotic" boss is "such an over-the-top caricature that it's actually uncomfortable to watch." With a little more balance between the emotional and the intellectual, the film "could have been the incisive and ideologically challenging gem it wants to be. As it stands, it still inspires thought and discussion without alienating or patronizing, even if it's hard to feel invested otherwise."

=== Audience response ===
At test screenings, audiences enjoyed the fact that the two conspirators, Seth and Nole, seem like "nice guys". There had been a debate among the crew as to whether such a pair of "nice guys" would actually do something criminal. Thomas, who took the view that they certainly could, takes the audience feedback and refers to his theory about "meta" reading by the audience: if the film had been about nice guys doing nice things, it would not get made because it would not be interesting; if, on the other hand, they had been "creeps" from the start, it would also be less interesting. Since they are established as nice guys from the start, the audience is left wondering if they will carry out their plan to the very end.

=== Accolade ===
- UBCP/ACTRA Award • Best Actress (Camille Sullivan), Union of British Columbia Performers/Alliance of Canadian Cinema, Television and Radio Artists (2015)
