= The Messenger (2015 Canadian film) =

- Directed by: Su Rynard
- Written by: Su Rynard
- Produced by: Joanne Jackson; Sally Blake; Diane Woods; Martin de la Fouchardiere
- Cinematography: Daniel Grant; Amar Arhab
- Production companies: SongbirdSOS Productions; Film à Cinq
- Release date: April 28, 2015 (Hot Docs)
- Running time: 84 minutes
- Country: Canada
- Language: English

The Messenger is a 2015 documentary film written and directed by Su Rynard, focusing on the protection of multiple types of songbirds throughout the world. The film's world premiere took place at the Hot Docs Canadian International Documentary Festival on April 28, 2015.

== Cast ==
The film features German composer and DJ Dominik Eulberg, expert Dr. Bridget Stutchbury, Michael Mesure, Dr. Christy Morrissey, Turkish ecologist Çağan Şekercioğlu, and ornithologist Alejandra Martinez-Salinas.

== Accolades ==
At the Hot Docs festival, The Messenger finished third in the audience balloting.

Daniel Grant and Amar Arhab received a Canadian Screen Award nomination for Best Cinematography in a Documentary at the 4th Canadian Screen Awards.

== Release ==
US Rights for the film were acquired by Kino Lorber, which started a limited theatrical run beginning in December 2015.
