= 2nd Jutra Awards =

2000 Canadian film awards ceremony

The 2nd Jutra Awards were held on March 5, 2000 to honour films made with the participation of the Quebec film industry in 1999. The hosts of the ceremony were Yves Jacques and Élise Guilbault.

Set Me Free (Emporte-moi) lead the ceremony with seven nominations. It won three competitive award and the award for Most Successful Film Outside Quebec. It also became the second film to win two acting awards: Best Actress for Karine Vanasse and Best Supporting Actress for Pascale Bussières.

Matroni and Me (Matroni et moi) also received seven nominations and became the first film to receive at least one acting nomination in all four categories. Its director, Jean-Philippe Duval, also received a nomination for Best Documentary for Lumière des oiseaux.

Post Mortem was the night's big winner with five awards from six nominations, including Best Film, Best Director, Best Screenplay and Best Actor for Gabriel Arcand.

For the second year in a row, the host of the ceremony received a Best Supporting Actor nomination, with Yves Jacques receiving a nod for his performance in Memories Unlocked (Souvenirs intimes).

== Winners and nominees ==
Best Film	Best Director
Post Mortem; The Last Breath (Le dernier souffle); Memories Unlocked (Souvenirs intimes); Set Me Free (Emporte-moi)	Louis Bélanger, Post Mortem; François Bouvier, Winter Stories (Histoires d'hiver); Jean-Philippe Duval, Matroni and Me (Matroni et moi); Léa Pool, Set Me Free (Emporte-moi)
Best Actor	Best Actress
Gabriel Arcand, Post Mortem; Sébastien Huberdeau, Sable Island (L'île de sable); Pierre Lebeau, Matroni and Me (Matroni et moi); Luc Picard, The Last Breath (Le dernier souffle)	Karine Vanasse, Set Me Free (Emporte-moi); Ginette Reno, Laura Cadieux II (Laura Cadieux...la suite); Pierrette Robitaille, Laura Cadieux II (Laura Cadieux...la suite); Guylaine Tremblay, Matroni and Me (Matroni et moi)
Best Supporting Actor	Best Supporting Actress
Julien Poulin, The Last Breath (Le Dernier Souffle); Jean-Pierre Bergeron, The Big Snake of the World (Le grand serpent du monde); Gary Boudreault, Matroni and Me (Matroni et moi); Yves Jacques, Memories Unlocked (Souvenirs intimes)	Pascale Bussières, Set Me Free (Emporte-moi); Maude Guérin, Matroni and Me (Matroni et moi); Louise Portal, The Big Snake of the World (Le grand serpent du monde); Linda Singer, The Last Breath (Le dernier souffle)
Best Screenplay	Best Cinematography
Louis Bélanger, Post Mortem; François Bouvier and Marc Robitaille, Winter Stories (Histoires d'hiver); Jean-Philippe Duval and Alexis Martin, Matroni and Me (Matroni et moi); Léa Pool, Set Me Free (Emporte-moi)	Pierre Gill, Memories Unlocked (Souvenirs intimes); Éric Cayla, Babel; Guy Dufaux, The Eleventh Child (Nguol thùa); André Turpin, Matroni and Me (Matroni et moi)
Best Art Direction	Best Sound
Serge Bureau and Michèle Hamel, Set Me Free (Emporte-moi); Claude Paré and Renée April, Grey Owl; Raymond Dupuis and Suzanne Harel, Laura Cadieux II (Laura Cadieux...la suite); Michel Marsolais and Hélène Schneider, Pin-Pon: The Film (Pin-Pon, le film)	Louis Hone, Normand Mercier, Claude Beaugrand and Hans Peter Strobl, Winter Stories (Histoires d'hiver); Bobby O'Malley, Dominique Delguste and Réjean Juteau, Four Days; Michel Charron, Jo Caron, Bruno Ruffolo, Louis Dupire, Michel Descombes and Gavin Fernandes, The Last Breath (Le dernier souffle); Serge Beauchemin, Louis Dupire, Hans Peter Strobl and Jo Caron, Memories Unlocked (Souvenirs intimes)
Best Editing	Best Original Music
Lorraine Dufour, Post Mortem; Michel Arcand, Set Me Free (Emporte-moi); André Corriveau, Winter Stories (Histoires d'hiver); José Heppell, Pin-Pon: The Film (Pin-Pon, le film)	Benoît Jutras, Alegría; Guy Bélanger and Steve Hill, Post Mortem; Gaëtan Gravel and Serge LaForest, The Big Snake of the World (Le grand serpent du monde); Richard Grégoire, Memories Unlocked (Souvenirs intimes)
Best Live Short Film	Best Animated Short Film
Louise Archambault, Atomic Saké; Stéphane Morissette, 2000 pieds carrés; Jean-François Asselin, The Little Story of a Man Without a Story (La petite histoire d'un homme sans histoire); Guy Bonneau and Martine Fortin, Mommie, There's a Monster in My Bed (Maman, y'a un monstre dans mon lit)	Aleksandr Petrov, The Old Man and the Sea; Pierre M. Trudeau, Cuckoo, Mr. Edgar! (Coucou, Monsieur Edgar!); Torill Kove, My Grandmother Ironed the King's Shirts; Wendy Tilby and Amanda Forbis, When the Day Breaks
Best Documentary	Special Awards
Patricio Henríquez, Images of a Dictatorship (Images d'une dictature); Jean-Philippe Duval, Light of the Snow Geese (Lumière des oiseaux); Serge Giguère, The Megaphone Reel (Le réel du mégaphone); Magnus Isacsson, The Choir Boys (Enfants de chœurs !); Lucie Lambert, Before Daybreak (Avant le jour)	Jutra Hommage: Frédéric Back; Most Successful Film Outside Quebec: Set Me Free (Emporte-moi); Billet d'or: Les Boys II

== Multiple wins and nominations ==
=== Films with multiple nominations ===
Nominations	Film
7	Matroni and Me (Matroni et moi)
7	Set Me Free (Emporte-moi)
6	Post Mortem
5	The Last Breath (Le dernier souffle)
5	Memories Unlocked (Souvenirs intimes)
4	Winter Stories (Histoires d'hiver)
3	The Big Snake of the World (Le grand serpent du monde)
3	Laura Cadieux II (Laura Cadieux...la suite)
2	Pin-Pon, le film

=== Films with multiple wins ===
Wins	Film
5	Post Mortem
4	Set Me Free (Emporte-moi)
