= Canadian Screen Award for Best Screenplay =

Screenwriting award for film

Canadian Screen Award for Best Original Screenplay
- Country: Canada
- Presented by: Academy of Canadian Cinema & Television
- First award: 1968
- Currently held by: R. T. Thorne & Glenn Taylor for 40 Acres (2025)
- Website: academy.ca/awards

Canadian Screen Award for Best Adapted Screenplay
- Country: Canada
- Presented by: Academy of Canadian Cinema & Television
- First award: 1968
- Currently held by: Mélanie Charbonneau & Martine Pagé for Out Standing (2025)
- Website: academy.ca/awards

The Academy of Canadian Cinema & Television presents one or more annual awards for the Best Screenplay for a Canadian film. Originally presented in 1968 as part of the Canadian Film Awards, from 1980 until 2012 the award continued as part of the Genie Awards ceremony. As of 2013, it is presented as part of the Canadian Screen Awards.

In their present form, two awards are presented for Best Original Screenplay and Best Adapted Screenplay, although historically this division was not always observed. In the Canadian Film Awards era, two awards were usually presented in Feature and Non-Feature (television films, short films, etc.) categories, although on two occasions the feature category was further divided into separate categories for Original and Adapted Screenplay, resulting in the presentation of three screenplay awards overall, and on two occasions only one award for Non-Feature Screenplay was presented. Under current Academy rules, the categories are collapsed into one if either category has fewer than five eligible submissions within the qualifying period; however, if both categories receive five or more eligible submissions, then separate awards are presented even if one category or the other ends up with fewer than five final nominees.

== 1960s ==
Year	Nominee	Film	Ref
1968; 20th Canadian Film Awards
1968; 20th Canadian Film Awards	Screenplay (Non-Feature)		
1968; 20th Canadian Film Awards	Phillip Hersch	Wojeck: "Swing Low Sweet Chariot"	
1969; 21st Canadian Film Awards
1969; 21st Canadian Film Awards	Screenplay (Non-Feature)		
1969; 21st Canadian Film Awards	Joan Finnigan	The Best Damn Fiddler from Calabogie to Kaladar	

== 1970s ==
Year	Nominee	Film	Ref
1970; 22nd Canadian Film Awards
1970; 22nd Canadian Film Awards	Screenplay (Feature)		
1970; 22nd Canadian Film Awards	William Fruet	Goin' Down the Road	
1970; 22nd Canadian Film Awards	Screenplay (Non-Feature)		
1970; 22nd Canadian Film Awards	Ian McNeill	Freud: The Hidden Nature of Man	
1971; 23rd Canadian Film Awards
1971; 23rd Canadian Film Awards	Screenplay (Feature)		
1971; 23rd Canadian Film Awards	Clément Perron	Mon oncle Antoine	
1971; 23rd Canadian Film Awards	Screenplay (Non-Feature)		
1971; 23rd Canadian Film Awards	Don Arioli	Propaganda Message and Hot Stuff	
1972; 24th Canadian Film Awards
1972; 24th Canadian Film Awards	Screenplay (Feature)		
1972; 24th Canadian Film Awards	Gilles Carle	The True Nature of Bernadette (La Vraie Nature de Bernadette)	
1972; 24th Canadian Film Awards	Screenplay (Non-Feature)		
1972; 24th Canadian Film Awards	Michel Tremblay	Françoise Durocher, Waitress	
1973; 25th Canadian Film Awards
1973; 25th Canadian Film Awards	Screenplay (Feature)		
1973; 25th Canadian Film Awards	Jacques Benoît, Denys Arcand	Réjeanne Padovani	
1973; 25th Canadian Film Awards	Screenplay (Non-Feature)		
1973; 25th Canadian Film Awards	Alvin Goldman, Douglas Jackson	The Sloane Affair	
1974
1974	No awards presented this year		
1975; 26th Canadian Film Awards
1975; 26th Canadian Film Awards	Original Screenplay (Feature)		
1975; 26th Canadian Film Awards	Michel Brault	Orders (Les Ordres)	
1975; 26th Canadian Film Awards	Adapted Screenplay (Feature)		
1975; 26th Canadian Film Awards	William Weintraub	Why Rock the Boat?	
1975; 26th Canadian Film Awards	Screenplay (Non-Feature)		
1975; 26th Canadian Film Awards	Patricia Watson	A Bird in the House	
1976; 27th Canadian Film Awards
1976; 27th Canadian Film Awards	Screenplay (Feature)		
1976; 27th Canadian Film Awards	Ted Allan	Lies My Father Told Me	
1976; 27th Canadian Film Awards	Screenplay (Non-Feature)		
1976; 27th Canadian Film Awards	David King	For Gentlemen Only	
1977; 28th Canadian Film Awards
1977; 28th Canadian Film Awards	Original Screenplay (Feature)		
1977; 28th Canadian Film Awards	Robin Spry, Peter Pearson, Peter Madden	One Man	
1977; 28th Canadian Film Awards	Zale Dalen	Skip Tracer	
1977; 28th Canadian Film Awards	Marcel Sabourin	J.A. Martin Photographer (J.A. Martin photographe)	
1977; 28th Canadian Film Awards	Ratch Wallace	Ragtime Summer	
1977; 28th Canadian Film Awards	Adapted Screenplay (Feature)		
1977; 28th Canadian Film Awards	James DeFelice	Why Shoot the Teacher?	
1977; 28th Canadian Film Awards	Richard Benner	Outrageous!	
1977; 28th Canadian Film Awards	Patricia Watson	Who Has Seen the Wind	
1977; 28th Canadian Film Awards	Stephen Zoller	Metal Messiah	
1977; 28th Canadian Film Awards	Screenplay (Non-Feature)		
1977; 28th Canadian Film Awards	Cam Hubert	Dreamspeaker	
1978; 29th Canadian Film Awards
1978; 29th Canadian Film Awards	Screenplay (Feature)		
1978; 29th Canadian Film Awards	Martyn Burke	Power Play	
1978; 29th Canadian Film Awards	Richard Gabourie	Three Card Monte	
1978; 29th Canadian Film Awards	William Gray, John Hunter	Blood and Guts	
1978; 29th Canadian Film Awards	Screenplay (Non-Feature)		
1978; 29th Canadian Film Awards	Gilles Carle	The Machine Age (L'Âge de la machine)	

== 1980s ==
Year	Nominees	Film	Ref
1980; 1st Genie Awards
1980; 1st Genie Awards	Original screenplay		
1980; 1st Genie Awards	Janis Allen, Dan Goldberg, Len Blum	Meatballs	
1980; 1st Genie Awards	Mireille Dansereau	Heartbreak (L'Arrache-cœur)	
1980; 1st Genie Awards	Allan Moyle, John Laing, Stephen Lack	The Rubber Gun	
1980; 1st Genie Awards	Jim Osborne	Summer's Children	
1980; 1st Genie Awards	Anne Claire Poirier, Marthe Blackburn	A Scream from Silence (Mourir à tue-tête)	
1980; 1st Genie Awards	Steven Hilliard Stern	Running	
1980; 1st Genie Awards	Adapted screenplay		
1980; 1st Genie Awards	Diana Maddox, William Gray	The Changeling	
1980; 1st Genie Awards	Ted Allan	It Rained All Night the Day I Left	
1980; 1st Genie Awards	Jean Beaudin, Marcel Sabourin	Cordélia	
1980; 1st Genie Awards	R. J. Dryer, Martin Lager	Jack London's Klondike Fever	
1980; 1st Genie Awards	Jean-Claude Lord, Jean Salvy	Chocolate Eclair (Éclair au chocolat)	
1981; 2nd Genie Awards
1981; 2nd Genie Awards	Original screenplay		
1981; 2nd Genie Awards	Réjean Ducharme	Good Riddance (Les Bons débarras)	
1981; 2nd Genie Awards	Marc Rosen	Final Assignment	
1981; 2nd Genie Awards	Jean-Claude Labrecque, Jacques Benoit	The Coffin Affair (L'Affaire Coffin)	
1981; 2nd Genie Awards	Micheline Lanctôt	The Handyman (L'Homme à tout faire)	
1981; 2nd Genie Awards	Ken Mitchell	The Hounds of Notre Dame	
1981; 2nd Genie Awards	Adapted screenplay		
1981; 2nd Genie Awards	Max Fischer	The Lucky Star	
1981; 2nd Genie Awards	Bernard Slade	Tribute	
1981; 2nd Genie Awards	Ronald Sutherland, Robin Spry	Suzanne	
1982; 3rd Genie Awards
1982; 3rd Genie Awards	Original screenplay		
1982; 3rd Genie Awards	Terence Heffernan	Heartaches	
1982; 3rd Genie Awards	Clay Borris	Alligator Shoes	
1982; 3rd Genie Awards	Paul Illidge, James Sanderson	Head On	
1982; 3rd Genie Awards	Adam Arkin, Ian Sutherland, Morrie Ruvinsky	Improper Channels	
1982; 3rd Genie Awards	Réjean Ducharme	Happy Memories (Les Beaux souvenirs)	
1982; 3rd Genie Awards	David Cronenberg	Scanners	
1982; 3rd Genie Awards	Adapted screenplay		
1982; 3rd Genie Awards	Roger Lemelin, Gilles Carle	The Plouffe Family (Les Plouffe)	
1982; 3rd Genie Awards	Anne Cameron, Ralph L. Thomas	Ticket to Heaven	
1982; 3rd Genie Awards	Diana Maddox	The Amateur	
1983; 4th Genie Awards
1983; 4th Genie Awards	Original screenplay		
1983; 4th Genie Awards	John Hunter	The Grey Fox	
1983; 4th Genie Awards	Phil Savath, Laurence Keane, Chris Windsor	Big Meat Eater	
1983; 4th Genie Awards	David Lee Henry	Harry Tracy, Desperado	
1983; 4th Genie Awards	John Juliani, Sharon Riis	Latitude 55°	
1983; 4th Genie Awards	Roger Fournier	A Day in a Taxi (Une journée en taxi)	
1983; 4th Genie Awards	Adapted screenplay		
1983; 4th Genie Awards	Richard Paluck, Robert Guza, Jr.	Melanie; Award later rescinded, due to late discovery that it did not meet the qualifications	
1983; 4th Genie Awards	Peter Dion	The Hot Touch	
1984; 5th Genie Awards
1984; 5th Genie Awards	Screenplay		
1984; 5th Genie Awards	Bob Clark	A Christmas Story	
1984; 5th Genie Awards	David Cronenberg	Videodrome	
1984; 5th Genie Awards	Jack Darcus	Deserters	
1984; 5th Genie Awards	Timothy Findley	The Wars	
1985; 6th Genie Awards
1985; 6th Genie Awards	Screenplay		
1985; 6th Genie Awards	Daniel Petrie	The Bay Boy	
1985; 6th Genie Awards	Micheline Lanctôt	Sonatine	
1985; 6th Genie Awards	Michel Langlois, Léa Pool	A Woman in Transit (La Femme de l'hôtel)	
1985; 6th Genie Awards	Don Owen	Unfinished Business	
1986; 7th Genie Awards
1986; 7th Genie Awards	Screenplay		
1986; 7th Genie Awards	Sandy Wilson	My American Cousin	
1986; 7th Genie Awards	Lise Lemay-Rousseau	The Alley Cat (Le Matou)	
1986; 7th Genie Awards	Mordecai Richler	Joshua Then and Now	
1986; 7th Genie Awards	Louise Rinfret, Claude Jutra	The Dame in Colour (La Dame en couleurs)	
1987; 8th Genie Awards
1987; 8th Genie Awards	Original screenplay		
1987; 8th Genie Awards	Denys Arcand	The Decline of the American Empire (Le Déclin de l'empire américain)	
1987; 8th Genie Awards	Sharon Riis	Loyalties	
1987; 8th Genie Awards	Yves Simoneau, Pierre Curzi	Intimate Power (Pouvoir intime)	
1987; 8th Genie Awards	Richard Nichol	Sitting in Limbo	
1987; 8th Genie Awards	Michael Jones, Andy Jones	The Adventure of Faustus Bidgood	
1987; 8th Genie Awards	Adapted screenplay		
1987; 8th Genie Awards	Leon Marr	Dancing in the Dark	
1987; 8th Genie Awards	Gordon Pinsent	John and the Missus	
1987; 8th Genie Awards	Peter Rowe	Lost!	
1988; 9th Genie Awards
1988; 9th Genie Awards	Screenplay		
1988; 9th Genie Awards	Jean-Claude Lauzon	Night Zoo (Un zoo la nuit)	
1988; 9th Genie Awards	Sally Bochner, John N. Smith, Sam Grana	Train of Dreams	
1988; 9th Genie Awards	Atom Egoyan	Family Viewing	
1988; 9th Genie Awards	William D. MacGillivray	Life Classes	
1988; 9th Genie Awards	Patricia Rozema	I've Heard the Mermaids Singing	
1989; 10th Genie Awards
1989; 10th Genie Awards	Original screenplay		
1989; 10th Genie Awards	Trevor Rhone, Glen Salzman	Milk and Honey	
1989; 10th Genie Awards	André Melançon, Jacques Bobet	The Tadpole and the Whale (La Grenouille et la baleine)	
1989; 10th Genie Awards	Marie-José Raymond, Claude Fournier, Michel Cournot	The Mills of Power (Les Tisserands du pouvoir)	
1989; 10th Genie Awards	Guy Maddin	Tales from the Gimli Hospital	
1989; 10th Genie Awards	Michael Rubbo	Tommy Tricker and the Stamp Traveller	
1989; 10th Genie Awards	Adapted screenplay		
1989; 10th Genie Awards	Norman Snider, David Cronenberg	Dead Ringers	
1989; 10th Genie Awards	Jackie Burroughs	A Winter Tan	
1989; 10th Genie Awards	Francis Mankiewicz, Jacques Savoie	The Revolving Doors (Les Portes tournantes)	
1989; 10th Genie Awards	Robin Spry, Douglas Bowie	Obsessed	
1989; 10th Genie Awards	Phil Savath	The Outside Chance of Maximilian Glick	

== 1990s ==
Year	Nominees	Film	Ref
1990; 11th Genie Awards
1990; 11th Genie Awards	Original screenplay		
1990; 11th Genie Awards	Denys Arcand	Jesus of Montreal (Jésus de Montréal)	
1990; 11th Genie Awards	Anne Wheeler	Bye Bye Blues	
1990; 11th Genie Awards	Don McKellar	Roadkill	
1990; 11th Genie Awards	Atom Egoyan	Speaking Parts	
1990; 11th Genie Awards	Colleen Murphy	Termini Station	
1990; 11th Genie Awards	Peter Mettler	The Top of His Head	
1990; 11th Genie Awards	Adapted screenplay		
1990; 11th Genie Awards	Richard Beattie, Elliot L. Sims	Cold Comfort	
1990; 11th Genie Awards	Dany Laferrière, Richard Sadler	How to Make Love to a Negro Without Getting Tired (Comment faire l'amour avec un nègre sans se fatiguer)	
1990; 11th Genie Awards	John Varley	Millennium	
1991; 12th Genie Awards
1991; 12th Genie Awards	Original screenplay		
1991; 12th Genie Awards	Paul Quarrington, Eugene Lipinski	Perfectly Normal	
1991; 12th Genie Awards	Claire Wojas	Love Crazy (Amoureux fou)	
1991; 12th Genie Awards	Darrell Wasyk	H	
1991; 12th Genie Awards	Pierre Falardeau	The Party (Le Party)	
1991; 12th Genie Awards	André Forcier, Jacques Marcotte	An Imaginary Tale (Une Histoire inventée)	
1991; 12th Genie Awards	Adapted screenplay		
1991; 12th Genie Awards	Brian Moore	Black Robe	
1991; 12th Genie Awards	James DeFelice, Anne Wheeler	Angel Square	
1991; 12th Genie Awards	Léa Pool, Laurent Gagliardi, Michel Langlois	The Savage Woman (La Demoiselle sauvage)	
1992; 13th Genie Awards
1992; 13th Genie Awards	Original screenplay		
1992; 13th Genie Awards	Jean-Claude Lauzon	Léolo	
1992; 13th Genie Awards	Paul Donovan, Bill Fleming	Buried on Sunday	
1992; 13th Genie Awards	Paul Tana, Bruno Ramirez	The Saracen Woman (La Sarrasine)	
1992; 13th Genie Awards	Jeff Schultz	North of Pittsburgh	
1992; 13th Genie Awards	Francis Damberger	Solitaire	
1992; 13th Genie Awards	Adapted screenplay		
1992; 13th Genie Awards	David Cronenberg	Naked Lunch	
1992; 13th Genie Awards	Kelly Rebar	Bordertown Café	
1992; 13th Genie Awards	Yvon Rivard, Jacques Leduc	Phantom Life (La Vie fantôme)	
1992; 13th Genie Awards	David Brandes	The Quarrel	
1992; 13th Genie Awards	Gail Singer	True Confections	
1993; 14th Genie Awards
1993; 14th Genie Awards	Screenplay		
1993; 14th Genie Awards	Peggy Thompson	The Lotus Eaters	
1993; 14th Genie Awards	Suzette Couture, Pierre Sarrazin	La Florida	
1993; 14th Genie Awards	Atom Egoyan	Calendar	
1993; 14th Genie Awards	François Girard, Don McKellar	Thirty-Two Short Films About Glenn Gould	
1993; 14th Genie Awards	David King	Harmony Cats	
1994; 15th Genie Awards
1994; 15th Genie Awards	Original screenplay		
1994; 15th Genie Awards	Atom Egoyan	Exotica	
1994; 15th Genie Awards	Mina Shum	Double Happiness	
1994; 15th Genie Awards	Gilles Desjardins	Les Pots cassés	
1994; 15th Genie Awards	Roger Cantin	Matusalem	
1994; 15th Genie Awards	Léa Pool	Desire in Motion (Mouvements du désir)	
1994; 15th Genie Awards	Adapted screenplay		
1994; 15th Genie Awards	Brad Fraser	Love and Human Remains	
1994; 15th Genie Awards	Jefferson Lewis	Ordinary Magic	
1994; 15th Genie Awards	Paul Quarrington, Richard J. Lewis	Whale Music	
1995; 16th Genie Awards
1995; 16th Genie Awards	Screenplay		
1995; 16th Genie Awards	Gerald Wexler, Mort Ransen	Margaret's Museum	
1995; 16th Genie Awards	Sylvain Guy	Black List (Liste noire)	
1995; 16th Genie Awards	Clément Virgo	Rude	
1995; 16th Genie Awards	Stephen Williams	Soul Survivor	
1996; 17th Genie Awards
1996; 17th Genie Awards	Original screenplay		
1996; 17th Genie Awards	Pierre Gang	Not Me! (Sous-sol)	
1996; 17th Genie Awards	Andrew Rai Berzins	Blood and Donuts	
1996; 17th Genie Awards	Gilles Carle	Poor Man's Pudding (Pudding chômeur)	
1996; 17th Genie Awards	Donald Martin	Never Too Late	
1996; 17th Genie Awards	Peter Wellington, Doug Smith	The Boys Club	
1996; 17th Genie Awards	Adapted screenplay		
1996; 17th Genie Awards	David Cronenberg	Crash	
1996; 17th Genie Awards	Noel S. Baker	Hard Core Logo	
1996; 17th Genie Awards	Michel Marc Bouchard, Linda Gaboriau	Lilies	
1996; 17th Genie Awards	John L'Ecuyer	Curtis's Charm	
1996; 17th Genie Awards	Robert Lepage, Marie Brassard	Polygraph (Le Polygraphe)	
1997; 18th Genie Awards
1997; 18th Genie Awards	Screenplay		
1997; 18th Genie Awards	Thom Fitzgerald	The Hanging Garden	
1997; 18th Genie Awards	Atom Egoyan	The Sweet Hereafter	
1997; 18th Genie Awards	André Forcier	The Countess of Baton Rouge (La Comtesse de Bâton Rouge)	
1997; 18th Genie Awards	Gabriel Pelletier, Yves Pelletier, Andrée Pelletier, Ann Burke	Karmina	
1997; 18th Genie Awards	Lynne Stopkewich, Angus Fraser	Kissed	
1998; 19th Genie Awards
1998; 19th Genie Awards	Screenplay		
1998; 19th Genie Awards	François Girard, Don McKellar	The Red Violin	
1998; 19th Genie Awards	Don McKellar	Last Night	
1998; 19th Genie Awards	André Morency, Robert Lepage	Nô	
1998; 19th Genie Awards	Allan Scott	Regeneration	
1998; 19th Genie Awards	Sooni Taraporevala	Such a Long Journey	
1999; 20th Genie Awards
1999; 20th Genie Awards	Original screenplay		
1999; 20th Genie Awards	Louis Bélanger	Post Mortem	
1999; 20th Genie Awards	Bruce McCulloch	Dog Park	
1999; 20th Genie Awards	Jeremy Podeswa	The Five Senses	
1999; 20th Genie Awards	Léa Pool	Set Me Free (Emporte-moi)	
1999; 20th Genie Awards	Monique Proulx	The Big Snake of the World (Le Grand Serpent du monde)	
1999; 20th Genie Awards	Adapted screenplay		
1999; 20th Genie Awards	Atom Egoyan	Felicia's Journey	
1999; 20th Genie Awards	François Bouvier, Marc Robitaille	Winter Stories (Histoires d'hiver)	
1999; 20th Genie Awards	Jean-Philippe Duval, Alexis Martin	Matroni and Me (Matroni et moi)	
1999; 20th Genie Awards	Kim Hogan	Heart of the Sun	
1999; 20th Genie Awards	Wayne Johnston	The Divine Ryans	
1999; 20th Genie Awards	Monique Proulx, Jean Beaudin	Memories Unlocked (Souvenirs intimes)	

== 2000s ==
Year	Nominees	Film	Ref
2000; 21st Genie Awards
2000; 21st Genie Awards	Screenplay		
2000; 21st Genie Awards	Denis Villeneuve	Maelström	
2000; 21st Genie Awards	Denys Arcand, Jacob Potashnik	Stardom	
2000; 21st Genie Awards	Frank Borg	My Father's Angel	
2000; 21st Genie Awards	Michel Marc Bouchard, Gilles Desjardins	The Orphan Muses (Les Muses orphelines)	
2000; 21st Genie Awards	Clement Virgo	Love Come Down	
2001; 22nd Genie Awards
2001; 22nd Genie Awards	Screenplay		
2001; 22nd Genie Awards	Paul Apak Angilirq	Atanarjuat: The Fast Runner	
2001; 22nd Genie Awards	Renny Bartlett	Eisenstein	
2001; 22nd Genie Awards	Catherine Martin	Marriages (Mariages)	
2001; 22nd Genie Awards	Judith Thompson	Lost and Delirious	
2001; 22nd Genie Awards	André Turpin	Soft Shell Man (Un crabe dans la tête)	
2002; 23rd Genie Awards
2002; 23rd Genie Awards	Original screenplay		
2002; 23rd Genie Awards	Deepa Mehta	Bollywood/Hollywood	
2002; 23rd Genie Awards	Atom Egoyan	Ararat	
2002; 23rd Genie Awards	Paul Gross, John Krizanc	Men with Brooms	
2002; 23rd Genie Awards	Robert Morin	The Negro (Le nèg')	
2002; 23rd Genie Awards	Jean-Phillipe Pearson, Patrice Robitaille, Ricardo Trogi	Québec-Montréal	
2002; 23rd Genie Awards	Adapted screenplay		
2002; 23rd Genie Awards	Sharon Riis	Savage Messiah	
2002; 23rd Genie Awards	Dominique Demers	The Mysterious Miss C. (La Mystérieuse mademoiselle C.)	
2002; 23rd Genie Awards	Patrick McGrath	Spider	
2002; 23rd Genie Awards	Edward Riche	Rare Birds	
2002; 23rd Genie Awards	Judith Thompson	Perfect Pie	
2003; 24th Genie Awards
2003; 24th Genie Awards	Original screenplay		
2003; 24th Genie Awards	Denys Arcand	The Barbarian Invasions (Les Invasions barbares)	
2003; 24th Genie Awards	Louis Bélanger	Gaz Bar Blues	
2003; 24th Genie Awards	Sébastien Rose	How My Mother Gave Birth to Me During Menopause (Comment ma mère accoucha de moi durant sa ménopause)	
2003; 24th Genie Awards	Ken Scott	Seducing Doctor Lewis (La Grande séduction)	
2003; 24th Genie Awards	Peter Wellington	Luck	
2003; 24th Genie Awards	Adapted screenplay		
2003; 24th Genie Awards	Robert Lepage	Far Side of the Moon (La Face cachée de la lune)	
2003; 24th Genie Awards	Maurice Chauvet	Owning Mahowny	
2003; 24th Genie Awards	Daniel MacIvor	Marion Bridge	
2003; 24th Genie Awards	Charles Martin Smith	The Snow Walker	
2003; 24th Genie Awards	Esta Spalding	Falling Angels	
2004; 25th Genie Awards
2004; 25th Genie Awards	Original screenplay		
2004; 25th Genie Awards	Francis Leclerc, Marcel Beaulieu	Looking for Alexander (Mémoires affectives)	
2004; 25th Genie Awards	Denise Filiatrault	Bittersweet Memories (Ma vie en cinémascope)	
2004; 25th Genie Awards	Federico Hidalgo, Paulina Robles	A Silent Love	
2004; 25th Genie Awards	Don McKellar, Michael Goldbach	Childstar	
2004; 25th Genie Awards	David "Sudz" Sutherland	Love, Sex and Eating the Bones	
2004; 25th Genie Awards	Adapted screenplay		
2004; 25th Genie Awards	Luc Dionne, Sylvain Guy	Machine Gun Molly (Monica la mitraille)	
2004; 25th Genie Awards	Joël Champetier, Daniel Roby	White Skin (La Peau blanche)	
2004; 25th Genie Awards	Jerry Ciccoritti	Blood	
2004; 25th Genie Awards	Todd Klinck, Jaie Laplante, John Palmer	Sugar	
2004; 25th Genie Awards	Jacob Tierney	Twist	
2005; 26th Genie Awards
2005; 26th Genie Awards	Original screenplay		
2005; 26th Genie Awards	Jean-Marc Vallée, François Boulay	C.R.A.Z.Y.	
2005; 26th Genie Awards	Louise Archambault	Familia	
2005; 26th Genie Awards	Michael Dowse	It's All Gone Pete Tong	
2005; 26th Genie Awards	Deepa Mehta	Water	
2005; 26th Genie Awards	Luc Picard	Audition (L'Audition)	
2005; 26th Genie Awards	Adapted screenplay		
2005; 26th Genie Awards	Atom Egoyan	Where the Truth Lies	
2005; 26th Genie Awards	Diane Cailhier	The Outlander (Le Survenant)	
2005; 26th Genie Awards	David Christensen	Six Figures	
2005; 26th Genie Awards	Luc Dionne	Aurore	
2005; 26th Genie Awards	Nathalie Petrowski	Maman Last Call	
2006; 27th Genie Awards
2006; 27th Genie Awards	Original screenplay		
2006; 27th Genie Awards	Philippe Falardeau	Congorama	
2006; 27th Genie Awards	Martin Girard, Ghyslaine Côté	A Family Secret (Le secret de ma mère)	
2006; 27th Genie Awards	Stéphane Lapointe	The Secret Life of Happy People (La Vie secrète des gens heureux)	
2006; 27th Genie Awards	Ken Scott	The Little Book of Revenge (Guide de la petite vengeance)	
2006; 27th Genie Awards	Ken Scott	The Rocket (Maurice Richard)	
2006; 27th Genie Awards	Adapted screenplay		
2006; 27th Genie Awards	Robert Favreau, Gil Courtemanche	A Sunday in Kigali (Un dimanche à Kigali)	
2006; 27th Genie Awards	Mike Clattenburg, Robb Wells	Trailer Park Boys: The Movie	
2006; 27th Genie Awards	François Létourneau	Cheech	
2007; 28th Genie Awards
2007; 28th Genie Awards	Original screenplay		
2007; 28th Genie Awards	Steven Knight	Eastern Promises	
2007; 28th Genie Awards	Denys Arcand	Days of Darkness (L'Âge des ténèbres)	
2007; 28th Genie Awards	Douglas Coupland	Everything's Gone Green	
2007; 28th Genie Awards	Pierre Lamothe, Claude Lalonde	The 3 L'il Pigs (Les 3 p'tits cochons)	
2007; 28th Genie Awards	Marc-André Lavoie, Simon Olivier Fecteau and David Gauthier	Bluff	
2007; 28th Genie Awards	Adapted screenplay		
2007; 28th Genie Awards	Sarah Polley	Away From Her	
2007; 28th Genie Awards	Michael Donovan	Shake Hands With the Devil	
2007; 28th Genie Awards	Maureen Medved	The Tracey Fragments	
2008; 29th Genie Awards
2008; 29th Genie Awards	Original screenplay		
2008; 29th Genie Awards	Bernard Émond	The Necessities of Life (Ce qu'il faut pour vivre)	
2008; 29th Genie Awards	Randall Cole	Real Time	
2008; 29th Genie Awards	Travis McDonald	Normal	
2008; 29th Genie Awards	Deepa Mehta	Heaven on Earth	
2008; 29th Genie Awards	Guillaume Vigneault	Everything Is Fine (Tout est parfait)	
2008; 29th Genie Awards	Adapted screenplay		
2008; 29th Genie Awards	Marie-Sissi Labrèche, Lyne Charlebois	Borderline	
2008; 29th Genie Awards	Richie Mehta, Shaun Mehta	Amal	
2008; 29th Genie Awards	Jeremy Podeswa	Fugitive Pieces	
2009; 30th Genie Awards
2009; 30th Genie Awards	Original screenplay		
2009; 30th Genie Awards	Jacques Davidts	Polytechnique	
2009; 30th Genie Awards	David Bezmozgis	Victoria Day	
2009; 30th Genie Awards	Atom Egoyan	Adoration	
2009; 30th Genie Awards	Émile Gaudreault, Ian Lauzon	Father and Guns (De père en flic)	
2009; 30th Genie Awards	Charles Officer, Ingrid Veninger	Nurse.Fighter.Boy	
2009; 30th Genie Awards	Adapted screenplay		
2009; 30th Genie Awards	Kari Skogland	Fifty Dead Men Walking	
2009; 30th Genie Awards	Tony Burgess	Pontypool	
2009; 30th Genie Awards	Marie-Hélène Cousineau, Susan Avingaq, Madeline Ivalu	Before Tomorrow (Le jour avant le lendemain)	

== 2010s ==
Year	Nominees	Films	Ref
2010; 31st Genie Awards
2010; 31st Genie Awards	Original screenplay		
2010; 31st Genie Awards	Jacob Tierney	The Trotsky	
2010; 31st Genie Awards	Peter Stebbings	Defendor	
2010; 31st Genie Awards	Adriana Maggs	Grown Up Movie Star	
2010; 31st Genie Awards	Louis Bélanger, Alexis Martin	Route 132	
2010; 31st Genie Awards	Claude Lalonde	10½	
2010; 31st Genie Awards	Adapted screenplay		
2010; 31st Genie Awards	Denis Villeneuve	Incendies	
2010; 31st Genie Awards	Michael Konyves	Barney's Version	
2010; 31st Genie Awards	Lee MacDougall	High Life	
2010; 31st Genie Awards	Vic Sarin, Dennis Foon, Catherine Spear	A Shine of Rainbows	
2010; 31st Genie Awards	Patrick Senécal	7 Days (Les 7 jours du Talion)	
2011; 32nd Genie Awards
2011; 32nd Genie Awards	Original screenplay		
2011; 32nd Genie Awards	Ken Scott, Martin Petit	Starbuck	
2011; 32nd Genie Awards	Anne Émond	Nuit #1	
2011; 32nd Genie Awards	Eilis Kirwan, Larysa Kondracki	The Whistleblower	
2011; 32nd Genie Awards	Jean-Marc Vallée	Café de Flore	
2011; 32nd Genie Awards	Ryan Ward, Matthew Heiti	Son of the Sunshine	
2011; 32nd Genie Awards	Adapted screenplay		
2011; 32nd Genie Awards	Philippe Falardeau	Monsieur Lazhar	
2011; 32nd Genie Awards	Ryan Redford	Oliver Sherman	
2011; 32nd Genie Awards	Steven Silver	The Bang Bang Club	
2011; 32nd Genie Awards	David F. Shamoon	In Darkness	
2012; 1st Canadian Screen Awards
2012; 1st Canadian Screen Awards	Original screenplay		
2012; 1st Canadian Screen Awards	Kim Nguyen	War Witch (Rebelle)	
2012; 1st Canadian Screen Awards	Jason Buxton	Blackbird	
2012; 1st Canadian Screen Awards	Xavier Dolan	Laurence Anyways	
2012; 1st Canadian Screen Awards	Bernard Émond	All That You Possess (Tout ce que tu possèdes)	
2012; 1st Canadian Screen Awards	Michael McGowan	Still Mine	
2012; 1st Canadian Screen Awards	Adapted screenplay		
2012; 1st Canadian Screen Awards	Salman Rushdie	Midnight's Children	
2012; 1st Canadian Screen Awards	Jay Baruchel, Evan Goldberg	Goon	
2012; 1st Canadian Screen Awards	David Cronenberg	Cosmopolis	
2012; 1st Canadian Screen Awards	Anita Doron	The Lesser Blessed	
2012; 1st Canadian Screen Awards	Martin Villeneuve	Mars and April (Mars et Avril)	
2013; 2nd Canadian Screen Awards
2013; 2nd Canadian Screen Awards	Original screenplay		
2013; 2nd Canadian Screen Awards	Shannon Masters	Empire of Dirt	
2013; 2nd Canadian Screen Awards	Emanuel Hoss-Desmarais, Marc Tulin	Whitewash	
2013; 2nd Canadian Screen Awards	Richie Mehta	Siddharth	
2013; 2nd Canadian Screen Awards	Sébastien Pilote	The Dismantling (Le Démantèlement)	
2013; 2nd Canadian Screen Awards	Jonathan Sobol	The Art of the Steal	
2013; 2nd Canadian Screen Awards	Adapted screenplay		
2013; 2nd Canadian Screen Awards	Elan Mastai	The F Word	
2013; 2nd Canadian Screen Awards	Michel Marc Bouchard, Xavier Dolan	Tom at the Farm (Tom à la ferme)	
2013; 2nd Canadian Screen Awards	Javier Gullón	Enemy	
2013; 2nd Canadian Screen Awards	Robert Lepage	Triptyque	
2013; 2nd Canadian Screen Awards	Ken Scott, Michael Dowse	The Grand Seduction	
2014; 3rd Canadian Screen Awards
2014; 3rd Canadian Screen Awards	Original screenplay		
2014; 3rd Canadian Screen Awards	Xavier Dolan	Mommy	
2014; 3rd Canadian Screen Awards	Pearl Ball-Harding, Albert Shin	In Her Place	
2014; 3rd Canadian Screen Awards	Atom Egoyan, David Fraser	The Captive	
2014; 3rd Canadian Screen Awards	Stéphane Lafleur	You're Sleeping Nicole (Tu dors Nicole)	
2014; 3rd Canadian Screen Awards	Bruce Wagner	Maps to the Stars	
2014; 3rd Canadian Screen Awards	Adapted screenplay		
2014; 3rd Canadian Screen Awards	Nicolas Billon	Elephant Song	
2014; 3rd Canadian Screen Awards	Scott Abramovitch	The Calling	
2014; 3rd Canadian Screen Awards	Joel Thomas Hynes	Cast No Shadow	
2015; 4th Canadian Screen Awards
2015; 4th Canadian Screen Awards	Original screenplay		
2015; 4th Canadian Screen Awards	Benjamin August	Remember	
2015; 4th Canadian Screen Awards	Anne Émond	Our Loved Ones (Les Êtres chers)	
2015; 4th Canadian Screen Awards	Philippe Falardeau	My Internship in Canada (Guibord s'en va-t'en-guerre)	
2015; 4th Canadian Screen Awards	Matthew Hansen	Zoom	
2015; 4th Canadian Screen Awards	André Turpin	Endorphine	
2015; 4th Canadian Screen Awards	Adapted screenplay		
2015; 4th Canadian Screen Awards	Emma Donoghue	Room	
2015; 4th Canadian Screen Awards	Josh Epstein, Kyle Rideout	Eadweard	
2015; 4th Canadian Screen Awards	Wiebke von Carolsfeld	The Saver	
2016; 5th Canadian Screen Awards
2016; 5th Canadian Screen Awards	Original screenplay		
2016; 5th Canadian Screen Awards	Daniel MacIvor	Weirdos	
2016; 5th Canadian Screen Awards	Kevan Funk	Hello Destroyer	
2016; 5th Canadian Screen Awards	Zacharias Kunuk	Searchers (Maliglutit)	
2016; 5th Canadian Screen Awards	Johnny Ma	Old Stone	
2016; 5th Canadian Screen Awards	Stella Meghie	Jean of the Joneses	
2016; 5th Canadian Screen Awards	Adapted screenplay		
2016; 5th Canadian Screen Awards	Xavier Dolan	It's Only the End of the World (Juste la fin du monde)	
2016; 5th Canadian Screen Awards	Bachir Bensaddek	Montreal, White City (Montréal la blanche)	
2016; 5th Canadian Screen Awards	David Bezmozgis	Natasha	
2017; 6th Canadian Screen Awards
2017; 6th Canadian Screen Awards	Original screenplay		
2017; 6th Canadian Screen Awards	Sherry White	Maudie	
2017; 6th Canadian Screen Awards	Josh Epstein, Kyle Rideout	Adventures in Public School	
2017; 6th Canadian Screen Awards	Sadaf Foroughi	Ava	
2017; 6th Canadian Screen Awards	Kathleen Hepburn	Never Steady, Never Still	
2017; 6th Canadian Screen Awards	Sarah Kolasky, Adam Garnet Jones	Great Great Great	
2017; 6th Canadian Screen Awards	Adapted screenplay		
2017; 6th Canadian Screen Awards	Anita Doron	The Breadwinner	
2017; 6th Canadian Screen Awards	Nicole Bélanger	Cross My Heart (Les Rois mongols)	
2017; 6th Canadian Screen Awards	Susan Coyne	The Man Who Invented Christmas	
2017; 6th Canadian Screen Awards	Simon Lavoie	The Little Girl Who Was Too Fond of Matches (La petite fille qui aimait trop les allumettes)	
2017; 6th Canadian Screen Awards	Gabriel Sabourin	It's the Heart That Dies Last (C'est le cœur qui meurt en dernier)	
2018; 7th Canadian Screen Awards
2018; 7th Canadian Screen Awards	Original screenplay		
2018; 7th Canadian Screen Awards	Catherine Léger	Slut in a Good Way (Charlotte a du fun)	
2018; 7th Canadian Screen Awards	Renée Beaulieu	Les Salopes, or the Naturally Wanton Pleasure of Skin (Les salopes ou le sucre naturel de la peau)	
2018; 7th Canadian Screen Awards	Marc Bisaillon	With Love (L'Amour)	
2018; 7th Canadian Screen Awards	Philippe Lesage	Genesis (Genèse)	
2018; 7th Canadian Screen Awards	Guillaume Lemans	Just a Breath Away (Dans la brume)	
2018; 7th Canadian Screen Awards	Adapted screenplay		
2018; 7th Canadian Screen Awards	Robert Budreau	Stockholm	
2018; 7th Canadian Screen Awards	Sharon Lewis	Brown Girl Begins	
2018; 7th Canadian Screen Awards	Nathan Parker	Our House	
2018; 7th Canadian Screen Awards	Arturo Pérez Torres	The Drawer Boy	
2018; 7th Canadian Screen Awards	Paul Risacher, Claude Landry, Maxime Landry	Racetime (La Course des tuques)	
2019; 8th Canadian Screen Awards
2019; 8th Canadian Screen Awards	Original screenplay		
2019; 8th Canadian Screen Awards	Kathleen Hepburn, Elle-Máijá Tailfeathers	The Body Remembers When the World Broke Open	
2019; 8th Canadian Screen Awards	Jonas Chernick, Jeremy Lalonde	James vs. His Future Self	
2019; 8th Canadian Screen Awards	Anne Émond	Young Juliette (Jeune Juliette)	
2019; 8th Canadian Screen Awards	Matthew Rankin	The Twentieth Century	
2019; 8th Canadian Screen Awards	Calvin Thomas, Yonah Lewis	White Lie	
2019; 8th Canadian Screen Awards	Adapted screenplay		
2019; 8th Canadian Screen Awards	Sophie Deraspe	Antigone	
2019; 8th Canadian Screen Awards	Louise Archambault	And the Birds Rained Down (Il pleuvait des oiseaux)	
2019; 8th Canadian Screen Awards	Denis Côté	Ghost Town Anthology (Répertoire des villes disparus)	
2019; 8th Canadian Screen Awards	Guillaume de Fontenay, Guillaume Vigneault, Jean Barbe	Sympathy for the Devil (Sympathie pour le diable)	
2019; 8th Canadian Screen Awards	Myriam Verreault, Naomi Fontaine	Kuessipan	

== 2020s ==
Year	Nominees	Films	Ref
2020; 9th Canadian Screen Awards
2020; 9th Canadian Screen Awards	Original screenplay		
2020; 9th Canadian Screen Awards	Charles Officer, Wendy Motion Brathwaite	Akilla's Escape	
2020; 9th Canadian Screen Awards	Jeff Barnaby	Blood Quantum	
2020; 9th Canadian Screen Awards	Sean Durkin	The Nest	
2020; 9th Canadian Screen Awards	Sophie Dupuis	Underground (Souterrain)	
2020; 9th Canadian Screen Awards	Evan Morgan	The Kid Detective	
2020; 9th Canadian Screen Awards	Adapted screenplay		
2020; 9th Canadian Screen Awards	Shyam Selvadurai, Deepa Mehta	Funny Boy	
2020; 9th Canadian Screen Awards	Johnny Darrell, Andrew Duncan, Loretta Todd	Monkey Beach	
2020; 9th Canadian Screen Awards	Patrick deWitt	French Exit	
2020; 9th Canadian Screen Awards	Catherine Léger	Goddess of the Fireflies (La déesse des mouches à feu)	
2020; 9th Canadian Screen Awards	Taylor Olson	Bone Cage	
2021; 10th Canadian Screen Awards
2021; 10th Canadian Screen Awards	Original screenplay		
2021; 10th Canadian Screen Awards	Danis Goulet	Night Raiders	
2021; 10th Canadian Screen Awards	Igor Drljaca	The White Fortress (Tabija)	
2021; 10th Canadian Screen Awards	Bretten Hannam	Wildhood	
2021; 10th Canadian Screen Awards	Kaveh Nabatian	Without Havana (Sin la Habana)	
2021; 10th Canadian Screen Awards	Mark O'Brien	The Righteous	
2021; 10th Canadian Screen Awards	Adapted screenplay		
2021; 10th Canadian Screen Awards	Catherine Hernandez	Scarborough	
2021; 10th Canadian Screen Awards	David Bezmozgis, Erik Rutherford	Charlotte	
2021; 10th Canadian Screen Awards	Sylvain Guy	Confessions of a Hitman (Confessions)	
2021; 10th Canadian Screen Awards	Fred Pellerin	The Time Thief (L'Arracheuse de temps)	
2021; 10th Canadian Screen Awards	Éric Tessier	You Will Remember Me (Tu te souviendras de moi)	
2022; 11th Canadian Screen Awards
2022; 11th Canadian Screen Awards	Original screenplay		
2022; 11th Canadian Screen Awards	Anthony Shim	Riceboy Sleeps	
2022; 11th Canadian Screen Awards	Marie Clements	Bones of Crows	
2022; 11th Canadian Screen Awards	Sadaf Foroughi	Summer with Hope	
2022; 11th Canadian Screen Awards	Sophie Jarvis	Until Branches Bend	
2022; 11th Canadian Screen Awards	Stéphane Lafleur, Eric K. Boulianne	Viking	
2022; 11th Canadian Screen Awards	Adapted screenplay		
2022; 11th Canadian Screen Awards	Clement Virgo	Brother	
2022; 11th Canadian Screen Awards	Charlotte Le Bon	Falcon Lake	
2022; 11th Canadian Screen Awards	Catherine Léger	Babysitter	
2023; 12th Canadian Screen Awards
2023; 12th Canadian Screen Awards	Original screenplay		
2023; 12th Canadian Screen Awards	Ariane Louis-Seize, Christine Doyon	Humanist Vampire Seeking Consenting Suicidal Person (Vampire humaniste cherche suicidaire consentant)	
2023; 12th Canadian Screen Awards	Monia Chokri	The Nature of Love (Simple comme Sylvain)	
2023; 12th Canadian Screen Awards	Brandon Cronenberg	Infinity Pool	
2023; 12th Canadian Screen Awards	Delphine Girard	Through the Night (Quitter la nuit)	
2023; 12th Canadian Screen Awards	Cody Lightning, Samuel Miller	Hey, Viktor!	
2023; 12th Canadian Screen Awards	Pascal Plante	Red Rooms (Les Chambres rouges)	
2023; 12th Canadian Screen Awards	Adapted screenplay		
2023; 12th Canadian Screen Awards	Matt Johnson, Matthew Miller	BlackBerry	
2023; 12th Canadian Screen Awards	Sarah-Maude Beauchesne	Billie Blue (Cœur de slush)	
2023; 12th Canadian Screen Awards	Eric K. Boulianne, Francis Leclerc	The Dishwasher (Le Plongeur)	
2023; 12th Canadian Screen Awards	Jacques Davidts	Ru	
2023; 12th Canadian Screen Awards	Fawzia Mirza	The Queen of My Dreams	
2023; 12th Canadian Screen Awards	Alexandra Weir	North of Normal	
2024; 13th Canadian Screen Awards
2024; 13th Canadian Screen Awards	Original screenplay		
2024; 13th Canadian Screen Awards	Matthew Rankin, Pirouz Nemati, Ila Firouzabadi	Universal Language (Une langue universelle)	
2024; 13th Canadian Screen Awards	Henry Bernadet, Isabelle Brouillette, Nicolas Krief	Gamma Rays (Les Rayons gammma)	
2024; 13th Canadian Screen Awards	Karen Chapman	Village Keeper	
2024; 13th Canadian Screen Awards	Kaniehtiio Horn	Seeds	
2024; 13th Canadian Screen Awards	Sarah Lévesque, François Péloquin	The Thawing of Ice (La fonte des glaces)	
2024; 13th Canadian Screen Awards	Jerome Yoo	Mongrels	
2024; 13th Canadian Screen Awards	Adapted screenplay		
2024; 13th Canadian Screen Awards	Sook-Yin Lee, Joanne Sarazen	Paying for It	
2024; 13th Canadian Screen Awards	Jason Buxton	Sharp Corner	
2024; 13th Canadian Screen Awards	Sophie Deraspe, Mathyas Lefebure	Shepherds (Bergers)	
2024; 13th Canadian Screen Awards	Atom Egoyan	Seven Veils	
2024; 13th Canadian Screen Awards	Sébastien Girard	Blue Sky Jo (La petite et le vieux)	
2024; 13th Canadian Screen Awards	Naomi Jaye	Darkest Miriam	
2025; 14th Canadian Screen Awards
2025; 14th Canadian Screen Awards	Original screenplay		
2025; 14th Canadian Screen Awards	R. T. Thorne, Glenn Taylor	40 Acres	
2025; 14th Canadian Screen Awards	Alexandre Auger, Éric K. Boulianne	Follies (Folichonneries)	
2025; 14th Canadian Screen Awards	Alexandre Auger, Mathieu Denis	The Cost of Heaven (Gagne ton ciel)	
2025; 14th Canadian Screen Awards	Alireza Khatami	The Things You Kill	
2025; 14th Canadian Screen Awards	Chandler Levack	Mile End Kicks	
2025; 14th Canadian Screen Awards	Sophy Romvari	Blue Heron	
2025; 14th Canadian Screen Awards	Adapted screenplay		
2025; 14th Canadian Screen Awards	Mélanie Charbonneau, Martine Pagé	Out Standing	
2025; 14th Canadian Screen Awards	Philippe Falardeau	Lovely Day (Mille secrets mille dangers)	
2025; 14th Canadian Screen Awards	Catherine Léger	Two Women (Deux femmes en or)	

== See also ==
- Prix Iris for Best Screenplay
