= List of Canadian submissions for the Academy Award for Best International Feature Film =

Best International Feature Film submissions from Canada

Highlights
- Debut: 1971
- Submissions: 52
- Nominations: 7
- Oscar winners: 1

Canada has submitted films for the Academy Award for Best International Feature Film (Note: The category was previously named the Academy Award for Best Foreign Language Film, but this was changed to the Academy Award for Best International Feature Film in April 2019, after the Academy deemed the word "Foreign" to be outdated.) since 1971. The award is handed out annually by the United States Academy of Motion Picture Arts and Sciences to a feature-length motion picture produced outside the United States that contains primarily non-English dialogue. It was not created until the 1956 Academy Awards, in which a competitive Academy Award of Merit, known as the Best Foreign Language Film Award, was created for non-English speaking films, and has been given annually since.

As of 2026, Canada has been nominated seven times, winning once for The Barbarian Invasions (2003).

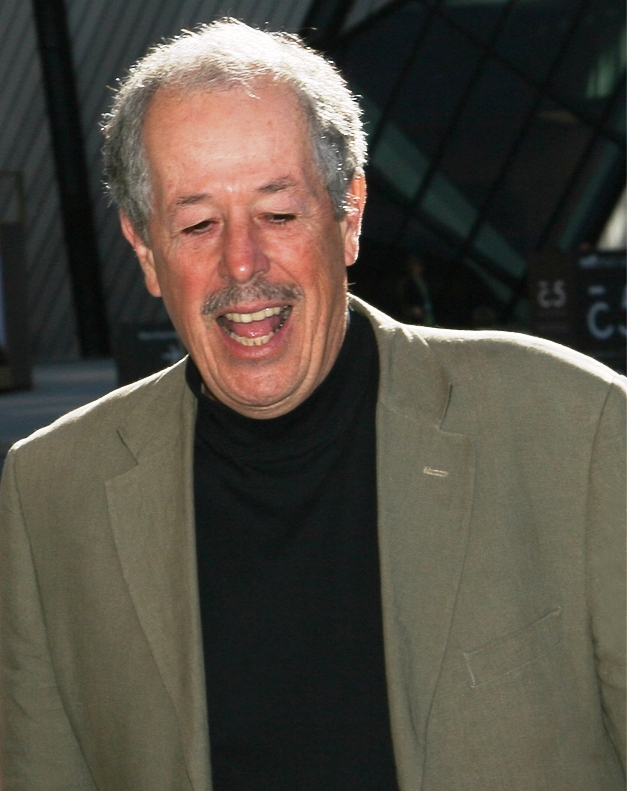
Denys Arcand, director of The Barbarian Invasions (2003), the only Canadian film to receive the Academy Award for Best Foreign Language Film.

Of the 51 films selected to date as Canada's submission to the Academy Awards, 18 of them have also won the Canadian Screen Award for Best Motion Picture.

== Submissions ==
The Academy of Motion Picture Arts and Sciences has invited the film industries of various countries to submit their best film for the Academy Award for Best International Feature Film since 1956. The International Feature Film Committee oversees the process and reviews all the submitted films. Following this, they vote via secret ballot to determine the five nominees for the award.

The process of choosing the submission is administered by Telefilm Canada.

Between the seven Canadian nominations, three have been directed by Denys Arcand: Jesus of Montreal, (1989); The Decline of the American Empire (1986); and its sequel, The Barbarian Invasions (2003). While Days of Darkness (2007) was shortlisted, but was not nominated.

The other four Canadian filmmakers to have their films nominated are Deepa Mehta for Water (2005), Denis Villeneuve for Incendies (2010), Philippe Falardeau for Monsieur Lazhar (2011), and Kim Nguyen for War Witch (2012).

Days of Darkness (2007), The Necessities of Life (2008), It's Only the End of the World (2016), and Universal Language (2024), all advanced to the December shortlists, but were not nominated.

Most of the submissions were Québécois films shot in French, with seven exceptions: A Bullet in the Head's fictional language (1991), Atanarjuat in Inuktitut (2001), Water in Hindi (2005), Eternal Spring in Mandarin (2022), Rojek in Kurdish (2023), Universal Language in Persian (2024) and The Things You Kill in Turkish (2025). Other French-language submissions have also featured a substantial amount of Inuktitut (The Necessities of Life), Lingala (War Witch), Yiddish (Felix and Meira), and Mohawk and Algonquin (Hochelaga, Land of Souls).

For the 93rd Academy Awards, Deepa Mehta's Funny Boy (2020) was disqualified for containing morer than 50% of English dialogue.

Below is a list of the films that have been submitted by Canada for review by the academy for the award by year and the respective Academy Awards ceremony.

Year (Ceremony)	Film title used in nomination	Original title	Language(s)	Director	Result
1971 (44th)	Mon oncle Antoine		French	Claude Jutra	Not nominated
1972 (45th)	The True Nature of Bernadette	La Vraie Nature de Bernadette	French	Gilles Carle	Not nominated
1975 (48th)	Orders	Les Ordres	French	Michel Brault	Not nominated
1977 (50th)	J.A. Martin Photographer	J.A. Martin photographe	French	Jean Beaudin	Not nominated
1979 (52nd)	A Scream from Silence	Mourir à tue-tête	French	Anne Claire Poirier	Not nominated
1980 (53rd)	Good Riddance	Les Bons débarras	French	Francis Mankiewicz	Not nominated
1981 (54th)	The Plouffe Family	Les Plouffe	French, English	Gilles Carle	Not nominated
1982 (55th)	Wild Flowers	Les fleurs sauvages	French	Jean Pierre Lefebvre	Not nominated
1983 (56th)	The Tin Flute	Bonheur d'occasion	French	Claude Fournier	Not nominated
1984 (57th)	Sonatine		French	Micheline Lanctôt	Not nominated
1985 (58th)	Jacques and November	Jacques et novembre	French	François Bouvier and Jean Beaudry	Not nominated
1986 (59th)	The Decline of the American Empire	Le Déclin de l'empire américain	French, English	Denys Arcand	Nominated
1987 (60th)	Night Zoo	Un zoo la nuit	French	Jean-Claude Lauzon	Not nominated
1988 (61st)	The Revolving Doors	Les portes tournantes	French	Francis Mankiewicz	Not nominated
1989 (62nd)	Jesus of Montreal	Jésus de Montréal	French, English	Denys Arcand	Nominated
1990 (63rd)	An Imaginary Tale	Une histoire inventée	French	André Forcier	Not nominated
1991 (64th)	A Bullet in the Head		Fictional language	Attila Bertalan	Not nominated
1992 (65th)	Léolo		French	Jean-Claude Lauzon	Not nominated
1993 (66th)	The Sex of the Stars	Le sexe des étoiles	French	Paule Baillargeon	Not nominated
1994 (67th)	My Friend Max	Mon Amie Max	French	Michel Brault	Not nominated
1995 (68th)	The Confessional	Le Confessional	French	Robert Lepage	Not nominated
1996 (69th)	Not Me!	Sous-Sol	French	Pierre Gang	Not nominated
1997 (70th)	Cosmos		French	Jennifer Alleyn, Manon Briand, Marie-Julie Dallaire, Arto Paragamian, André Turpin, Denis Villeneuve	Not nominated
1998 (71st)	August 32nd on Earth	Un 32 Août sur Terre	French, English	Denis Villeneuve	Not nominated
1999 (72nd)	Set Me Free	Emporte-moi	French	Léa Pool	Not nominated
2000 (73rd)	Maelström		French	Denis Villeneuve	Not nominated
2001 (74th)	Atanarjuat: The Fast Runner	Atanarjuat	Inuktitut	Zacharias Kunuk	Not nominated
2002 (75th)	Un crabe dans la tête	Un crabe dans la tête	French	André Turpin	Not nominated
2003 (76th)	The Barbarian Invasions	Les Invasions barbares	French, English	Denys Arcand	Won Academy Award
2004 (77th)	Far Side of the Moon	La face cachée de la lune	French	Robert Lepage	Not nominated
2005 (78th)	C.R.A.Z.Y.		French	Jean-Marc Vallée	Not nominated
2006 (79th)	Water		Hindi, English	Deepa Mehta	Nominated
2007 (80th)	Days of Darkness	L'Âge des ténèbres	French	Denys Arcand	Made shortlist
2008 (81st)	The Necessities of Life	Ce qu'il faut pour vivre, Inuujjutiksaq	French, Inuktitut	Benoît Pilon	Made shortlist
2009 (82nd)	I Killed My Mother	J'ai tué ma mère	French	Xavier Dolan	Not nominated
2010 (83rd)	Incendies		French, Arabic	Denis Villeneuve	Nominated
2011 (84th)	Monsieur Lazhar		French, Arabic	Philippe Falardeau	Nominated
2012 (85th)	War Witch	Rebelle	French, Lingala	Kim Nguyen	Nominated
2013 (86th)	Gabrielle		French	Louise Archambault	Not nominated
2014 (87th)	Mommy		French	Xavier Dolan	Not nominated
2015 (88th)	Felix and Meira	Félix et Meira	French, Yiddish, English	Maxime Giroux	Not nominated
2016 (89th)	It's Only the End of the World	Juste la fin du monde	French	Xavier Dolan	Made shortlist
2017 (90th)	Hochelaga, Land of Souls	Hochelaga terre des âmes	French, English, Mohawk, Algonquin	François Girard	Not nominated
2018 (91st)	Family First	Chien de garde	French	Sophie Dupuis	Not nominated
2019 (92nd)	Antigone		French, English, Arabic	Sophie Deraspe	Not nominated
2020 (93rd)	14 Days, 12 Nights	14 jours, 12 nuits	French	Jean-Philippe Duval	Not nominated
2021 (94th)	Drunken Birds	Les Oiseaux ivres	French, Spanish	Ivan Grbovic	Not nominated
2022 (95th)	Eternal Spring	長春	Mandarin, English	Jason Loftus	Not nominated
2023 (96th)	Rojek		Kurdish, English, Arabic, French, German	Zaynê Akyol	Not nominated
2024 (97th)	Universal Language	Une langue universelle / آواز بوقلمون	French, Persian	Matthew Rankin	Made shortlist
2025 (98th)	The Things You Kill	Öldürdüğün Şeyler	Turkish	Alireza Khatami	Not nominated
2026 (99th)	Nina Roza		Bulgarian, French	Geneviève Dulude-De Celles	Pending

== See also ==
- List of Academy Award winners and nominees for Best International Feature Film
- List of Academy Award-winning foreign language films
- Top 10 Canadian Films of All Time
- Cinema of Canada
- Cinema of Quebec
