= Paul à Québec =

- Film poster
- Directed by: François Bouvier
- Written by: François Bouvier; Michel Rabagliati
- Based on: Paul à Québec by Michel Rabagliati
- Produced by: Nathalie Brigitte Bustos; Valérie d'Auteuil; André Rouleau; Karine Vanasse
- Starring: François Létourneau; Julie Le Breton; Gilbert Sicotte; Louise Portal
- Cinematography: Steve Asselin
- Edited by: Michel Arcand
- Music by: Benoît Charest
- Production company: Caramel Film
- Distributed by: Remstar
- Release date: September 18, 2015
- Running time: 98 minutes
- Country: Canada
- Language: French

Paul à Québec (lit. "Paul in Quebec City") is a Canadian drama film from Quebec, directed by François Bouvier and released in 2015.

Based on Michel Rabagliati's graphic novel of the same title, the film stars François Létourneau and Julie Le Breton as Paul and Lucie, a happy couple struggling to cope with Lucie's father Roland's (Gilbert Sicotte) diagnosis with terminal pancreatic cancer. The cast also includes Louise Portal, Bobby Beshro, David Menegon, Brigitte Lafleur, Myriam LeBlanc, Julien Poulin, Mathieu Quesnel, Patrice Robitaille, Geneviève Schmidt, Nathaly Thibault, Jasmine Lemée and Karine Vanasse.

Rabagliati originally approached Bouvier about adapting either Paul à Québec or Paul a un travail d'été for film, because he was a fan of Bouvier's earlier film Winter Stories (Histoires d'hiver). Around the same time as that personal contact, Karine Vanasse and Nathalie Brigitte Bustos, two of the film's producers, approached La Pastèque, Rabagliati's publisher, to inquire about optioning film rights to Paul à Quebec. Sicotte won the Québec Cinéma award for Best Actor at the 18th Quebec Cinema Awards.

== Plot ==
En 1999, Paul (François Létourneau), auteur-illustrateur travaillant dans une imprimerie, vit à Montréal avec sa conjointe Lucie (Julie Le Breton) et leur fille Rose. Lors des rassemblements familiaux estivaux à Saint-Nikola, près de Québec, la famille Beaulieu découvre que le père de Lucie, Roland (Gilbert Sicotte), est atteint d'un cancer incurable.

À mesure que l'état de santé de Roland se détériore, il est admis en maison de soins palliatifs. La famille se serre les coudes autour de lui pour l'accompagner jusqu'au bout dans la dignité, l'amour et la sérénité. En parallèle, cette épreuve intime inspire Paul et Romana dans son travail créatif et nourrit son parcours artistique.

== Cast ==
François Létourneau

Julie Le Breton

Gilbert Sicotte

Louise Portal

Nikola Hering

== See also ==
- List of French films of 2015
