= Billie Blue =

2023 Canadian comedy-drama film

- French: Cœur de slush
- Directed by: Mariloup Wolfe
- Written by: Sarah-Maude Beauchesne
- Based on: Cœur de slush by Sarah-Maude Beauchesne
- Produced by: Christian Larouche
- Starring: Liliane Skelly; Joseph Delorey; Camille Felton
- Cinematography: Simon-Pierre Gingras
- Edited by: Cédric Coussy
- Music by: Jean-Philippe Goncalves
- Production company: Christal Films
- Distributed by: Les Films Opale
- Release date: June 1, 2023 (Zlín)
- Running time: 116 minutes
- Country: Canada
- Language: French

Billie Blue (French: Cœur de slush) is a Canadian romantic comedy-drama film, directed by Mariloup Wolfe and released in 2023. The film stars Liliane Skelly as Billie, a teenager who is working in a summer job as a lifeguard at a water park; she develops a crush on Pierre (Joseph Delorey), a handsome cyclist, but finds herself in competition for Pierre's affections with her older sister Annette (Camille Felton).

The cast also includes François Létourneau, Salma Serraji, Vivi-Anne Riel, Jacob Whiteduck-Lavoie, Gabriell Audet, Zakary Belharbi, Anthony Belsile, Lucson-Yves Claude, Elya Corbeil, Charles Fournier, Charles Kardos, Audrey Lamonde, Magalie Langrais, Alexis Lefebvre and Renaud Lefebvre in supporting roles.

The screenplay was written by Sarah-Maude Beauchesne, as an adaptation of her own 2014 young adult novel.

== Distribution ==
The film premiered on June 1, 2023, at the Zlín Film Festival in the Czech Republic, before opening commercially in Quebec on June 15.

== Awards ==
Beauchesne received a Canadian Screen Award nomination for Best Adapted Screenplay at the 12th Canadian Screen Awards in 2024.
