= Heaven (2000 film) =

2000 Canadian film directed by Jean-Sébastien Lord

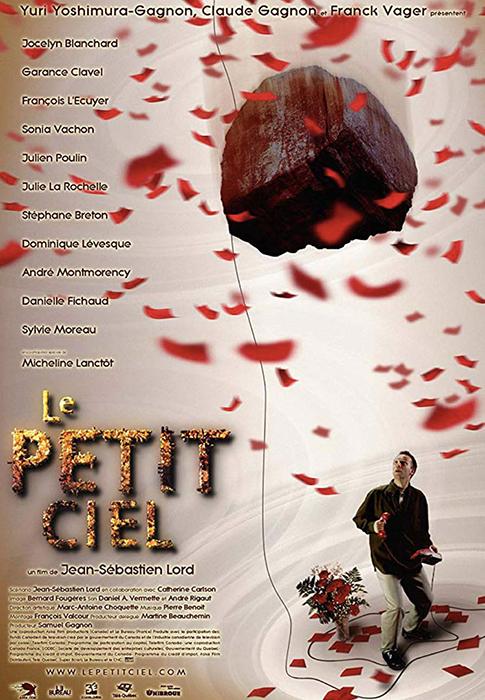
- Film poster
- French: Le Petit Ciel
- Directed by: Jean-Sébastien Lord
- Written by: Catherine Carlson; Jean-Sébastien Lord
- Produced by: Claude Gagnon; Samuel Gagnon
- Starring: Jocelyn Blanchard; Garance Clavel; Julien Poulin
- Cinematography: Bernard Fougères
- Edited by: François Valcourt
- Music by: Pierre Benoît
- Production company: Astral Films
- Distributed by: Aska Films
- Release date: March 17, 2000 (RVCQ)
- Running time: 92 minutes
- Country: Canada
- Language: French

Heaven (French: Le Petit Ciel) is a Canadian comedy-drama film, directed by Jean-Sébastien Lord and released in 2000. The film stars Jocelyn Blanchard as Jacques Sauvé, the owner of a failing bar in Montreal whose relationship with his girlfriend Sophie (Garance Clavel) is also under strain as he is dying of cancer; meanwhile, in heaven, guardian angels are trying to help out under the supervision of Nebuchadnezzar (André Montmorency) and Ivan the Terrible (Dominique Lévesque) while Jesus Christ (Julien Poulin), who has been the boss ever since God took retirement, is too busy trying to find his new girlfriend's g-spot to pay much attention to the actual operations of the workplace.

The film premiered on March 17, 2000 as the closing night gala of the Rendez-vous du cinéma québécois.

Poulin received a Jutra Award nomination for Best Supporting Actor at the 3rd Jutra Awards in 2001.
