= Leanna Chea =

French actress

Leanna Chea is a French actress of Vietnamese and Cambodian descent. She is most noted for her performance in the 2019 Canadian film 14 Days, 12 Nights (14 jours 12 nuits), for which she received a Canadian Screen Award nomination for Best Supporting Actress at the 8th Canadian Screen Awards.
