= Jean-Pierre Bergeron =

Canadian actor and filmmaker

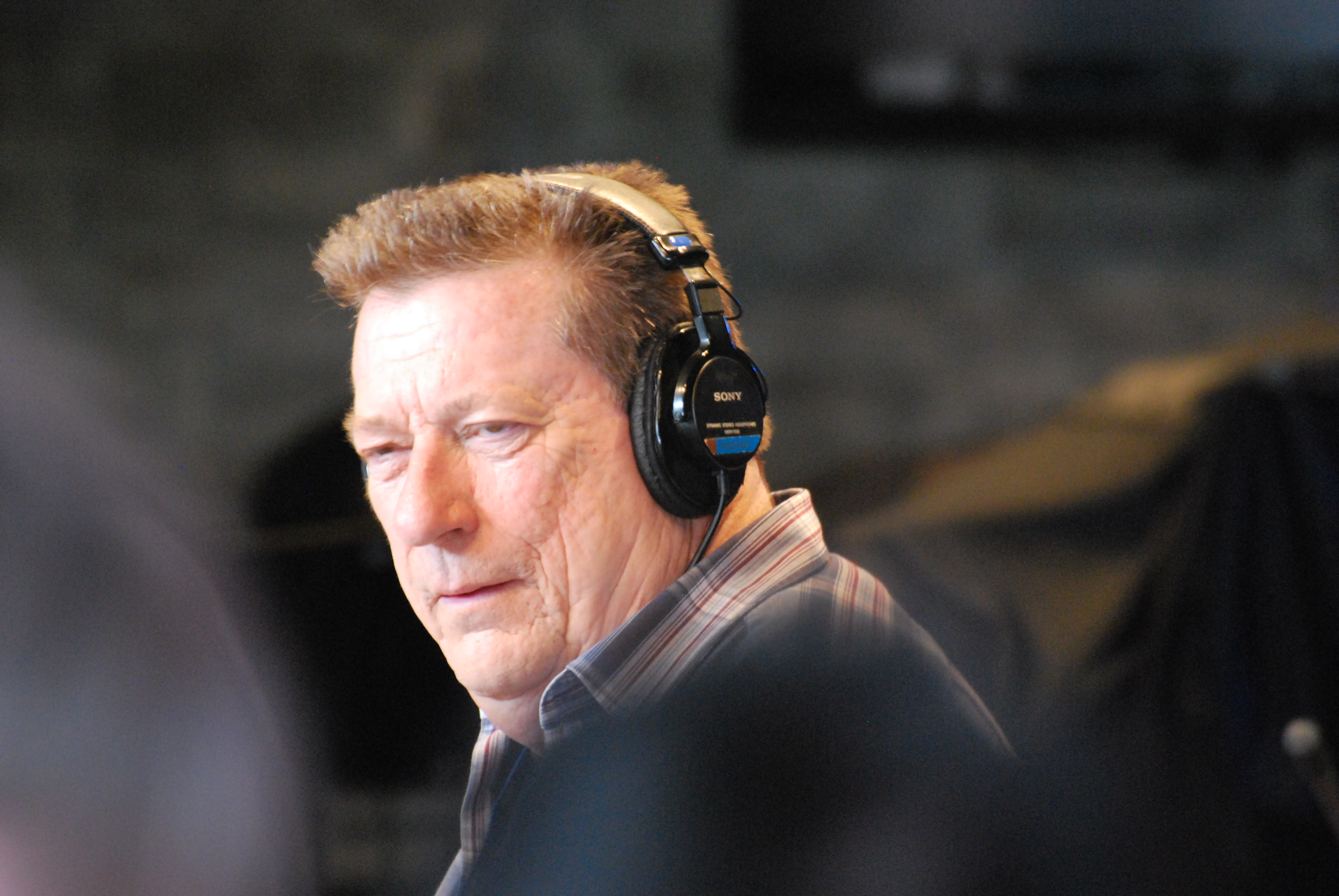
- Jean-Pierre Bergeron in 2012
- Born: 1952 (age 73–74); Jonquière, Quebec, Canada
- Occupations: Actor, filmmaker
- Years active: 1960s–present

Jean-Pierre Bergeron (born 1952) is a Canadian actor and film director from Quebec.

He is most noted for his performances in the film The Big Snake of the World (Le Grand serpent du monde), for which he received a Jutra Award nomination for Best Supporting Actor at the 2nd Jutra Awards in 2000, and the television film Prom Queen: The Marc Hall Story, for which he received a Gemini Award nomination for Best Supporting Actor in a Television Film or Miniseries at the 20th Gemini Awards in 2005.

== Background ==
Born in Jonquière, Quebec, he graduated from the National Theatre School of Canada in 1971.

== Career ==
He had early acting roles in the television series Rue des Pignons, Quelle famille ! and La Petite Patrie, and made his film debut with a small supporting role in Once Upon a Time in the East (Il était une fois dans l'est) in 1974.

Throughout his career he has regularly acted in both English-language and French-language films, television series and stage plays, as well as working as a theatre director.

In 2011 he made his filmmaking debut with Alone with Mr. Carter, a short film which starred Robert Naylor as a young boy coping with an unrequited crush on the older man next door. Around the same time, he came out as gay for the first time in his career, later telling the press that he had struggled to be open about his sexual orientation for many years because as an actor who had been associated principally with masculine "tough guy" roles such as police officers and criminals, he feared the possible effects on his career of coming out. He subsequently became more active and outspoken as an advocate for LGBTQ mental health and suicide prevention programs.

In 2023, expressing a desire to tell the often overlooked and underrepresented stories of older gay men, he began production on his first full-length feature film, Old Guys in Bed. The film premiered at the 29th Fantasia International Film Festival in 2025.

== Filmography ==
=== Film ===
Year	Title	Role	Notes
1974	Once Upon a Time in the East (Il était une fois dans l'est)	Cleaner	
1975	Dear Theo (Cher Théo)		
1975	Normande (La Tête de Normande St-Onge)		
1976	A Pacemaker and a Sidecar (L'Eau chaude, l'eau frette)	Julien	
1977	Claude Gauvreau	Lontil Deparey	
1977	One Man	Union man	
1980	Good Riddance (Les Bons débarras)	Fernand	
1987	Night Zoo (Un zoo la nuit)	Prison guard	
1987	Brother André (Le Frère André)		
1989	Cruising Bar	Nosel	
1989	Speed Zone	French Flight Passenger	
1990	Ding et Dong, le film	Jerôme	
1991	Four Stiffs and a Trombone (L'Assassin jouait du trombone)	Claude Champignac	
1993	Matusalem	Officer Letendre	
1997	Matusalem II (Matusalem II: le dernier des Beauchesne)	Officer Letendre	
1998	Winter Lily	Grant	
1998	Free Money	Lauter	
1999	The Big Snake of the World (Le Grand serpent du monde)	Jean Le Maigre	
2001	Druids (Vercingétorix : La Légende du druide roi)	Diviciac	
2003	Evil Words (Sur le seuil)	Fr. Boudreault	
2004	See This Movie	Professor	
2009	Sticky Fingers (Les doigts croches)	Isidore	
2010	File 13 (Filière 13)	Fecteau	
2011	Alone with Mr. Carter		Director
2013	The Four Soldiers (Les 4 soldats)	Cmdr. Lacoste	
2014	1987	Premier of Quebec	
2014	Henri Henri	Neighbour	
2016	Votez Bougon	Mr. Gagnon	
2021	Brain Freeze	Minister of public security	
2022	The Cheaters (Les Tricheurs)	Snack bar employee	
2023	Hurricane Boy Fuck You Tabarnak! (L'Ouragan F.Y.T.)	Hot dog man	
2023	Purgatory (Le Purgatoire des intimes)	Bernard Landriault	
2025	Old Guys in Bed		Director

=== Television ===
Year	Title	Role	Notes
1966	Rue des Pignons		
1972	Quelle famille !		
1974	La Petite Patrie		
1974	Avec le temps	Baron Dietrich	
1985	L'Or du temps	Bob Leclerc	
1988	La Maison Deschênes		
1990]	Les Filles de Caleb		
1990	Haute tension - Pour cent millions	Lanthier	
1991	Prince Lazure	Vallier	
1991	Lance et compte : Tous pour un	Maurice Pinard	
1992	Montréal P.Q.	Gérard Godin	
1992	Armen and Bullik	Auric	
1994	Les grands procès	Brother Fortin	
1995	Vents contraires	Diego	
1996	Innocence		
1997	Omerta II: La loi du silence	Marc-André Théoret	
1999	Bonanno: A Godfather's Story		
1999	Rue l'Espérance	Antoine Bourbonnais	
2002	The Last Chapter	Philip Gabriel	
2003	The Last Chapter II: The War Continues	Philip Gabriel	
2003	Alias	Gils Nacor	
2004	Just Desserts	Emile Fragonard	
2004	Prom Queen: The Marc Hall Story	Andy Hall	
2004	A Boyfriend for Christmas	Michael Rhodes	
2011	Comment survivre aux week-ends	Franco	
2016	Les Pêcheurs		
2016	Complexe G	Alex	
2017-2020	Faits divers	Yvan-Gilles Savard	
2020	Escouade 99	Journalist	
2021	Way Over Me (Sortez-moi de moi)	Shopkeeper	
2024	La Dernière Communion	Fr. Pierre	
