= Cuckoo, Mr. Edgar! =

- French: Coucou, Monsieur Edgar!
- Directed by: Pierre M. Trudeau
- Written by: Pierre M. Trudeau; Pierre-Michel Tremblay; Denis Saint-Denis
- Produced by: Marc Bertrand; Thérèse Descary
- Edited by: José Heppell
- Music by: Louis Gagné
- Production company: National Film Board of Canada
- Release date: 1999
- Running time: 13 minutes
- Country: Canada

Cuckoo, Mr. Edgar! (French: Coucou, Monsieur Edgar!) is a Canadian animated short film, directed by Pierre M. Trudeau and released in 1999. The film centres on Mr. Edgar, a mechanical bird in a cuckoo clock left inside an abandoned house, who is forced to adapt to the demands of fatherhood when a storm causes three eggs to tumble into the house's living room which soon hatch into baby birds.

The film received a Genie Award nomination for Best Animated Short Film at the 21st Genie Awards, and a Jutra Award nomination for Best Animated Short Film at the 2nd Jutra Awards.
