= Memories Unlocked =

- French: Souvenirs intimes
- Directed by: Jean Beaudin
- Written by: Jean Beaudin; Monique Proulx
- Based on: Homme invisible à la fenêtre by Monique Proulx
- Produced by: Jean-Roch Marcotte
- Starring: James Hyndman; Pascale Bussières
- Cinematography: Pierre Gill
- Edited by: Gaétan Huot
- Music by: Richard Grégoire
- Distributed by: Lionsgate Films
- Release date: 28 August 1999 (MWFF)
- Running time: 118 minutes
- Country: Canada
- Language: French

Memories Unlocked (French: Souvenirs intimes) is a Canadian drama film, directed by Jean Beaudin and released in 1999. Based on the novel Homme invisible à la fenêtre by Monique Proulx, the film stars James Hyndman as Max, a paraplegic artist whose ex-girlfriend Lucie (Pascale Bussières) returns several years after their breakup to accuse him of rape.

The film's cast also includes Pierre-Luc Brillant, Yves Jacques, Louise Portal, Michel Charette, Marcel Sabourin and Sébastien Huberdeau.

The film received four Genie Award nominations at the 20th Genie Awards: Best Adapted Screenplay (Beaudin, Proulx), Best Cinematography (Pierre Gill), Best Art Direction/Production Design (François Séguin) and Best Overall Sound (Serge Beauchemin, Bernard Gariépy Strobl and Hans Peter Strobl). It received five Prix Jutra nominations at the 2nd Jutra Awards, for Best Picture, Best Supporting Actor (Jacques), Best Cinematography (Gill), Best Sound (Serge Beauchemin, Louis Dupire, Hans Peter Strobl and Jo Caron) and Best Original Music (Richard Grégoire). Gill won the Jutra for cinematography.
