= The Sex of the Stars =

- Directed by: Paule Baillargeon
- Written by: Monique Proulx
- Produced by: Pierre Gendron; Jean-Roch Marcotte
- Starring: Marianne Coquelicot Mercier; Denis Mercier
- Cinematography: Éric Cayla
- Edited by: Hélène Girard
- Music by: Yves Laferrière
- Distributed by: First Run Features (USA)
- Release date: 1993
- Running time: 104 minutes
- Country: Canada
- Language: French

The Sex of the Stars (French: Le Sexe des étoiles) is a 1993 Canadian drama film directed by Paule Baillargeon and written by Monique Proulx. The film was selected as the Canadian entry for the Best Foreign Language Film at the 66th Academy Awards, but was not accepted as a nominee.

== Plot ==
Thirteen-year-old Camille (Mercier) is reunited with her long-lost father and has to come to terms with the fact that he is now a woman.

== Cast ==
- Marianne Coquelicot Mercier as Camille
- Denis Mercier as Marie-Pierre
- Tobie Pelletier as Lucky
- Sylvie Drapeau as Michele
- Luc Picard as J. Boulet
- Gilles Renaud as Jacob
- Jean-René Ouellet as Le dragueur

== See also ==
- List of submissions to the 66th Academy Awards for Best Foreign Language Film
- List of Canadian submissions for the Academy Award for Best Foreign Language Film
- List of LGBT films directed by women
