= The Orphan Muses =

- French: Les Muses orphelines
- Directed by: Robert Favreau
- Written by: Gilles Desjardins; Michel Marc Bouchard (play)
- Based on: Les Muses orphelines by Michel Marc Bouchard
- Produced by: Lyse Lafontaine; Pierre Latour
- Starring: Marina Orsini; Céline Bonnier; Stéphane Demers; Fanny Mallette; Louise Portal
- Cinematography: Pierre Mignot
- Edited by: Hélène Girard
- Music by: Michel Donato; James Gelfand
- Production company: Lyla Films
- Distributed by: Film Tonic
- Release date: November 3, 2000
- Running time: 107 minutes
- Country: Canada
- Language: French

The Orphan Muses (French: Les Muses orphelines) is a Canadian drama film, directed by Robert Favreau and released in 2000. An adaptation of the play by Michel Marc Bouchard, the film stars Marina Orsini, Céline Bonnier, Stéphane Demers and Fanny Mallette as a group of adult siblings dealing with the revelation of a longtime family secret.

The Tanguay siblings grew up as orphans, after their father died and their mother (Louise Portal) ran off with her new lover. Although older siblings Catherine (Orsini), Martine (Bonnier) and Luc (Demers) knew the truth, they conspired to protect their emotionally fragile youngest sister Isabelle (Mallette) by telling her that their mother was dead as well. The film's plot centres on the fallout within the family of the now adult but still emotionally immature Isabelle finally learning the truth that their mother is still alive and simply abandoned them.

== Cast ==
- Marina Orsini as Catherine Tanguay
- Céline Bonnier as Martine Tanguay
- Fanny Mallette as Isabelle Tanguay
- Stéphane Demers as Luc Tanguay
- Louise Portal as Jacqueline Tanguay
- Patrick Labbé as Rémi
- Eric Hoziel
- Paul Dion
- Raymond Legault
- Louise Proulx
- Gilles Cloutier
- Nathalie Claude

== Reception ==
The film received four Genie Award nominations at the 21st Genie Awards in 2000: Best Supporting Actress (Bonnier), Best Director (Favreau), Best Screenplay (Bouchard and Gilles Desjardins) and Best Editing (Hélène Girard). At the 3rd Jutra Awards in 2001, the film was nominated for Best Picture, Best Actress (Mallette), Best Director (Favreau), Best Sound, Best Editing and Best Original Music. It won the Jutra for Best Original Music.
