= Old Guys in Bed =

2025 Canadian comedy-drama film directed by Jean-Pierre Bergeron

- Directed by: Jean-Pierre Bergeron
- Written by: Jean-Pierre Bergeron
- Produced by: Jean-Pierre Bergeron; Danny Rossner
- Starring: Duff MacDonald; Paul James Saunders
- Release date: August 3, 2025 (Fantasia)
- Country: Canada
- Language: English

Old Guys in Bed is a Canadian romantic comedy-drama film, directed by Jean-Pierre Bergeron and released in 2025. The film stars Duff MacDonald as Paul, a historian who has just turned 60 years old and connects with the older Bill (Paul James Saunders) through online dating, and must figure out how to deal with the situation when Bill unexpectedly ghosts him.

The cast also includes Domenic Di Rosa, Joan Hart, Vlasta Vrana, Michael Mast, Al Hamameh and Kevin Raymond in supporting roles.

The film, Bergeron's full-length directorial debut following a long career as an actor, was inspired by his own experiences navigating online dating as an older gay man, as well as a desire to share the often underrepresented stories of older gay men. He made the film on a limited budget in 2023, before launching a crowdfunding campaign for financial assistance to complete post-production work on the film.

The film premiered at the 29th Fantasia International Film Festival.
