= Sarah-Maude Beauchesne =

Canadian writer (born 1990)

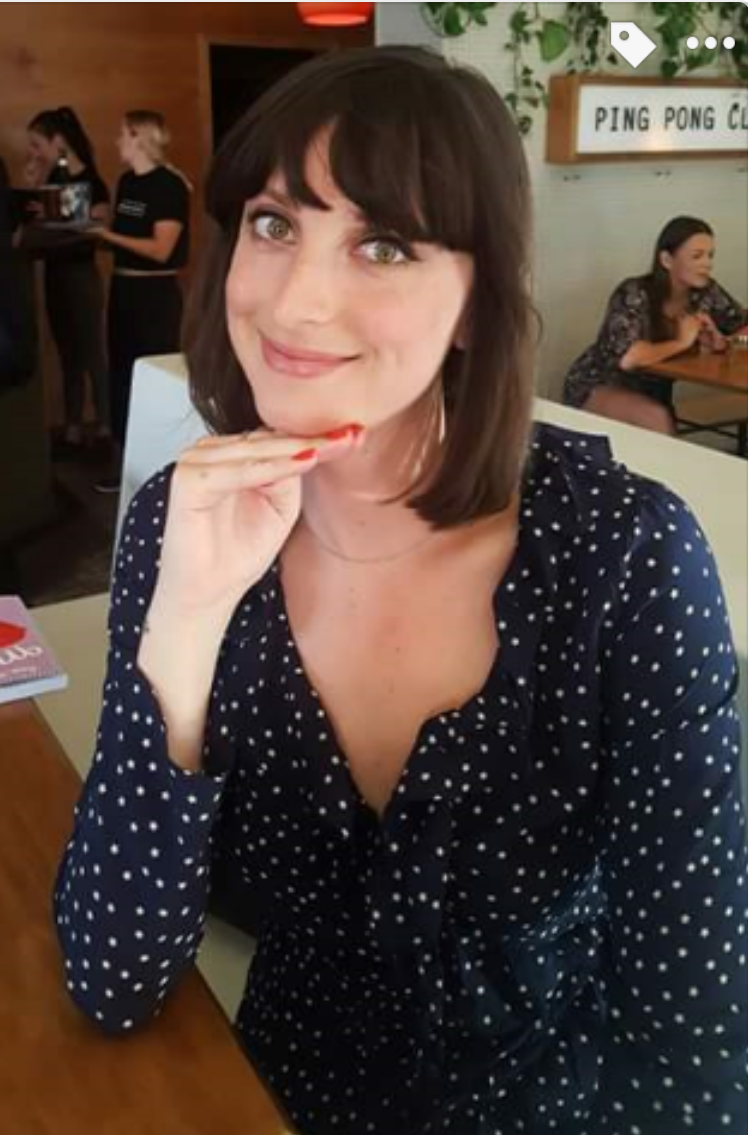
- Born: March 26, 1990 (age 36); Granby, Quebec, Canada
- Years active: 2010s–present

Sarah-Maude Beauchesne (born March 26, 1990) is a Canadian writer from Quebec, most noted as a writer of film and television productions. She was a Canadian Screen Award nominee for Best Adapted Screenplay at the 12th Canadian Screen Awards in 2024 for Billie Blue (Cœur de slush), a film adaptation of her own 2014 young adult novel.

Her television work has included the series Le Chalet, L'Académie, Bellefleur and Danse!,

Cœur de slush was selected for the 2021 edition of Le Combat des livres jeunesse.

== Books ==
- Les Je-sais-pas - 2011
- Je pleurais souvent - 2012
- Summer Forks: L'intégrale des Je-Sais-Pas - 2013
- Cœur de slush - 2014
- Billie-Lou - 2015
- Lèche-Vitrines - 2016
- Maxime - 2017
- L'été d'avant - 2018
- L'été d'après - 2020
- Les Fourchettes - 2020
- La Madrague - 2020
- Au lac d'amour - 2021
- Faire la romance - 2023
