= Le Temps des bouffons =

Le temps des bouffons
- Directed by: Pierre Falardeau
- Narrated by: Pierre Falardeau
- Release date: 1985
- Running time: 15 minutes
- Country: Canada
- Language: French

Le Temps des bouffons (French for Time of the Buffoons) is a short film created (and narrated) in 1985 by Québécois director Pierre Falardeau.

It compares English rule in Ghana with Canadian dominance in Quebec by showing the 200th anniversary celebration of the Beaver Club of Montreal. Falardeau speaks slowly and angrily during scenes of the Canadian élite laughing and toasting each other, some in pseudo-Colonial costume.

The film was shot in 1985 but never shown until 1993.
