= Monique Proulx =

Canadian writer

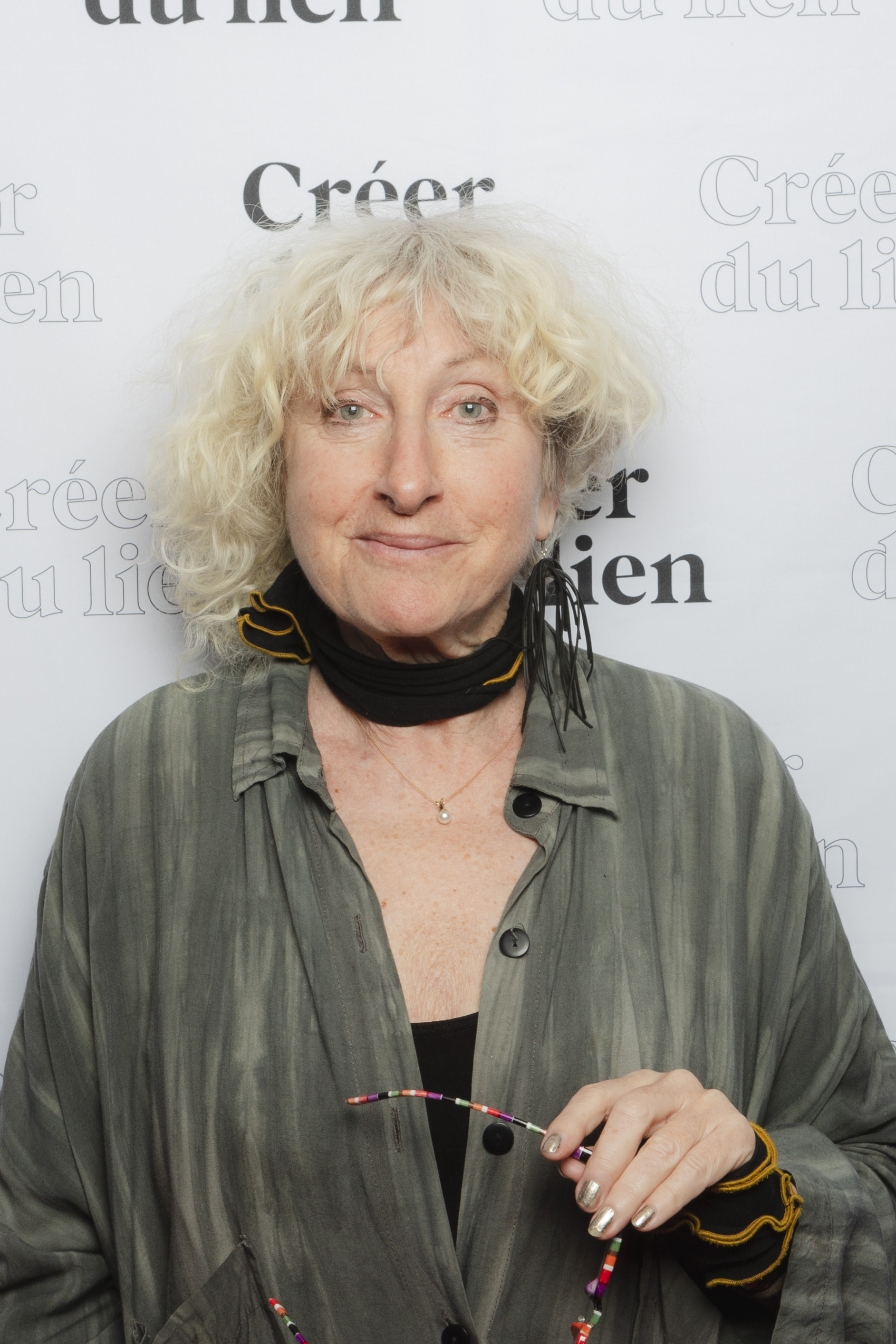
Image of Monique Proulx

Monique Proulx (born January 17, 1952, in Quebec City, Quebec) is a Canadian novelist, short story writer and screenwriter.

She obtained a bachelor's degree in literature and theater from Laval University. She was a theater facilitator, French teacher and information officer at the head office of the University of Quebec.

In the summer of 1980, she left her job to devote herself to writing her first book, Sans cœur et sans reproche (Without Heart and Without Reproach). In 1984, she came to settle in Montreal.

In 1993, Paule Baillargeon directed the film Sex of the Stars based on the screenplay by Monique Proulx adapted from her eponymous novel.

In January 2023, she was named the 2022 winner of the Prix des cinq continents de la francophonie for the novel published in 2022, Enlève la nuit.

She is a two-time nominee for the Governor General's Award for French language fiction for Le Cœur est un muscle involontaire at the 2002 Governor General's Awards and Champagne at the 2008 Governor General's Awards, and won the Prix Québec-Paris in 1993 for Homme invisible à la fenêtre.

As a screenwriter, her credits have included the films The Big Snake of the World (Le Grand Serpent du monde), The Sex of the Stars (Le Sexe des étoiles), Streetheart (Le cœur au poing), Memories Unlocked (Souvenirs intimes) and Deliver Me (Délivrez-moi). She received two Genie Award nominations for Best Screenplay at the 20th Genie Awards in 2000, in both the Original Screenplay category for The Big Snake of the World and the Adapted Screenplay category for Memories Unlocked.

== Works ==
- Sans cœur et sans reproche, (1983)
- Le sexe des étoiles (1987)
  - The Sex of the Stars (1996)
- Homme invisible à la fenêtre (1993)
  - Invisible Man at the Window (1994)
- Les Aurores montréales (1996)
  - Aurora Montrealis (1997)
- Le Cœur est un muscle involontaire (2002)
  - The Heart is an Involuntary Muscle (2003)
- Champagne (2008)
