= The Party (1990 film) =

- French: Le Party
- Directed by: Pierre Falardeau
- Written by: Pierre Falardeau
- Produced by: Bernadette Payeur
- Starring: Charlotte Laurier; Julien Poulin; Gildor Roy
- Cinematography: Alain Dostie
- Edited by: Michel Arcand
- Music by: Richard Desjardins; Gaston Gagnon
- Production company: ACPAV
- Distributed by: Cinexus/Famous Players
- Release date: 2 February 1990
- Running time: 103 minutes
- Country: Canada
- Language: French
- Budget: $3.2 million
- Box office: C$525,000 (Canada)

The Party (French: Le Party) is a Canadian drama film, written and directed by Pierre Falardeau. The film stars Charlotte Laurier, Julien Poulin, Gildor Roy and was released in 1990.

== Plot summary ==
Loosely based on the prison experiences of convicted Front de libération du Québec terrorist Francis Simard, the film centres on the annual party at the St. Vincent de Paul penitentiary in Laval, Quebec, where a group of prison inmates get to enjoy outside entertainment.

== Cast ==
- Charlotte Laurier as Alexandra
- Benoît Dagenais as Becique
- Julien Poulin as Boyer
- Lou Babin as Chanteuse western
- Roger Léger as Francis
- André Doucet as Ginette
- Gildor Roy as Jacques
- Louise Laprade as Journaliste
- Luc Proulx as Julien
- Alexis Martin.

== Production ==
Producer Bernadette Payeur said the striptease scene was filmed at the old Saint-Vincent-de-Paul penitentiary. In the scene Charlotte Laurier strips completely naked in front of dozens of extras, many of whom were ex-convicts. "It wasn't always easy to keep them quiet!" - Payeur said. Falardeau said none of the action seen in the film was "invented, every scene is true", and that Silmard was a witness to it all. He noted that not all of it happened "on the same night." He went on to say that if they had actually included "everything that really happened, nobody could have watched it." Simard and a former prisoner guard served as consultants on the film; advising the director on things like how prisoners could manage to kill themselves and how a strip search was really conducted.

== Reception ==
Lynn Saxberg wrote in The Ottawa Citizen that the film "has the disturbing scenes and language you might expect in a maximum-security penitentiary, but Falardeau also shows a dry sense of humor and a surprising amount of tenderness." Saxberg also observed that the main focus of the movie is "the show, but what's happening backstage is the meat of the film."

Elizabeth Aird of The Vancouver Sun said that "Falardeau wears his politics on his sleeve; he clearly despises the Quebec prison system and the bureaucrats and guards who run it." She goes on to note that Falardeau would like for viewers have empathy for the prisoners, and goes out of his way not to "tell us why any of them is behind bars; Falardeau's great triumph is that he doesn't separate politics and passion: This is a message movie, yes, but one that goes straight for the heart."

Canadian film critic Jay Scott wrote the movie "is certainly an assault on 'good taste' but it is deeply understanding of, and compassionate toward, human behavior." He also opined that "it escapes the oppressive symbolism and camp leering of most prison pictures, straight or otherwise; like the cons it is about, Le Party comes right out and says what it has to say, no holds barred ... even behind bars."

== Awards ==
The film received four Genie Award nominations at the 12th Genie Awards in 1991, for Best Supporting Actor (Poulin), Best Screenplay (Falardeau), Best Costume Design (Andrée Morin) and Best Editing (Michel Arcand).
