= Not Me! =

- Sous-sol
- Directed by: Pierre Gang
- Written by: Pierre Gang
- Produced by: Roger Frappier
- Starring: Richard Moffatt; Louise Portal; Isabelle Pasco
- Cinematography: Pierre Mignot
- Music by: Anne Bourne; Ken Myhr
- Release date: May 1996 (Cannes)
- Running time: 96 minutes
- Country: Canada
- Language: French

Not Me! (French: Sous-sol) is a Canadian drama film, released in 1996. The full-length directorial debut of Pierre Gang, the screenplay had been written by Gang a full 10 years before he was able to make the film. The film was selected as the Canadian entry for the Best Foreign Language Film at the 69th Academy Awards, but was not accepted as a nominee.

== Plot ==
It stars Richard Moffatt as René, an 11-year-old boy coming of age in 1967. When his father dies shortly after he accidentally witnesses his parents having sex, he becomes overly protective of his widowed mother Reine (Louise Portal) when she enters a new relationship with Roch (Patrice Godin), while simultaneously having his own sexual awakening when the attractive Françoise (Isabelle Pasco) moves into a neighbouring apartment.

== Release ==
The film premiered at the Cannes Film Festival in 1996, before opening commercially in Quebec on May 31.

== Awards and nominations ==
The film garnered two Genie Award nominations at the 17th Genie Awards in 1996, in the categories of Best Original Screenplay (Gang) and Best Actress (Portal). It won the award for Best Original Screenplay. Portal won the 1996 Prix Guy-L'Écuyer for Not Me!.

The film was Canada's submission for the Academy Award for Best Foreign Language Film at the 69th Academy Awards in 1997, but did not make the final shortlist.

== See also ==
- List of submissions to the 69th Academy Awards for Best Foreign Language Film
- List of Canadian submissions for the Academy Award for Best Foreign Language Film
