= The Big Snake of the World =

- French: Le Grand Serpent du monde
- Directed by: Yves Dion
- Written by: Monique Proulx
- Produced by: Monique Létourneau
- Starring: Murray Head; Gabriel Arcand; Louise Portal
- Cinematography: Paul Van der Linden
- Edited by: Yves Dion; Monique Fortier
- Music by: Gaëtan Gravel; Serge LaForest
- Production company: National Film Board of Canada
- Release date: September 17, 1999
- Running time: 99 minutes
- Country: Canada
- Language: French

The Big Snake of the World (French: Le Grand Serpent du monde) is a Canadian drama film, directed by Yves Dion and released in 1999. The film stars Murray Head as Tom Paradise, a night shift Société de transport de Montréal bus driver interacting with various people both on and off the job.

Supporting characters include Monsieur (Gabriel Arcand), a lonely man with schizophrenia; the Dog Lady (France Labonté), a woman who carries her dog with her everywhere she goes; the Teenager (Tobie Pelletier), a young man who rides the bus every night to get off at the Notre Dame des Neiges Cemetery; Anaïs (Zoe Latraverse), a young woman with a secret who tries to seduce Tom; and Carmen (Louise Portal), a former lover of Tom's with whom he is reunited.

The film received two Genie Award nominations at the 20th Genie Awards in 2000, for Best Supporting Actor (Arcand) and Best Original Screenplay (Monique Proulx). At the 2nd Jutra Awards, the film received nominations for Best Supporting Actor (Jean-Pierre Bergeron), Best Supporting Actress (Portal) and Best Original Music (Gaëtan Gravel and Serge LaForest).

== Plot ==
Tom Paradise (Murray Head) is a Montreal Transit Corporation bus driver who works nights and interacts with various people at work and outside of work.

The supporting characters include Mr. Paradise (Gabriel Arcand), a lonely man who suffers from schizophrenia; the lady with the dog (France Labonté), a woman who takes her dog everywhere she goes; the teenager (Tobie Pelletier), a young man who takes the bus every night to get off at Notre-Dame-des-Neiges Cemetery; Anaïs (Zoé Latraverse), a young woman who has a secret and tries to seduce Tom; and Carmen (Louise Portal), an old flame of Tom's whom he meets again.
