= Karine Vanasse =

Canadian actress (born 1983)

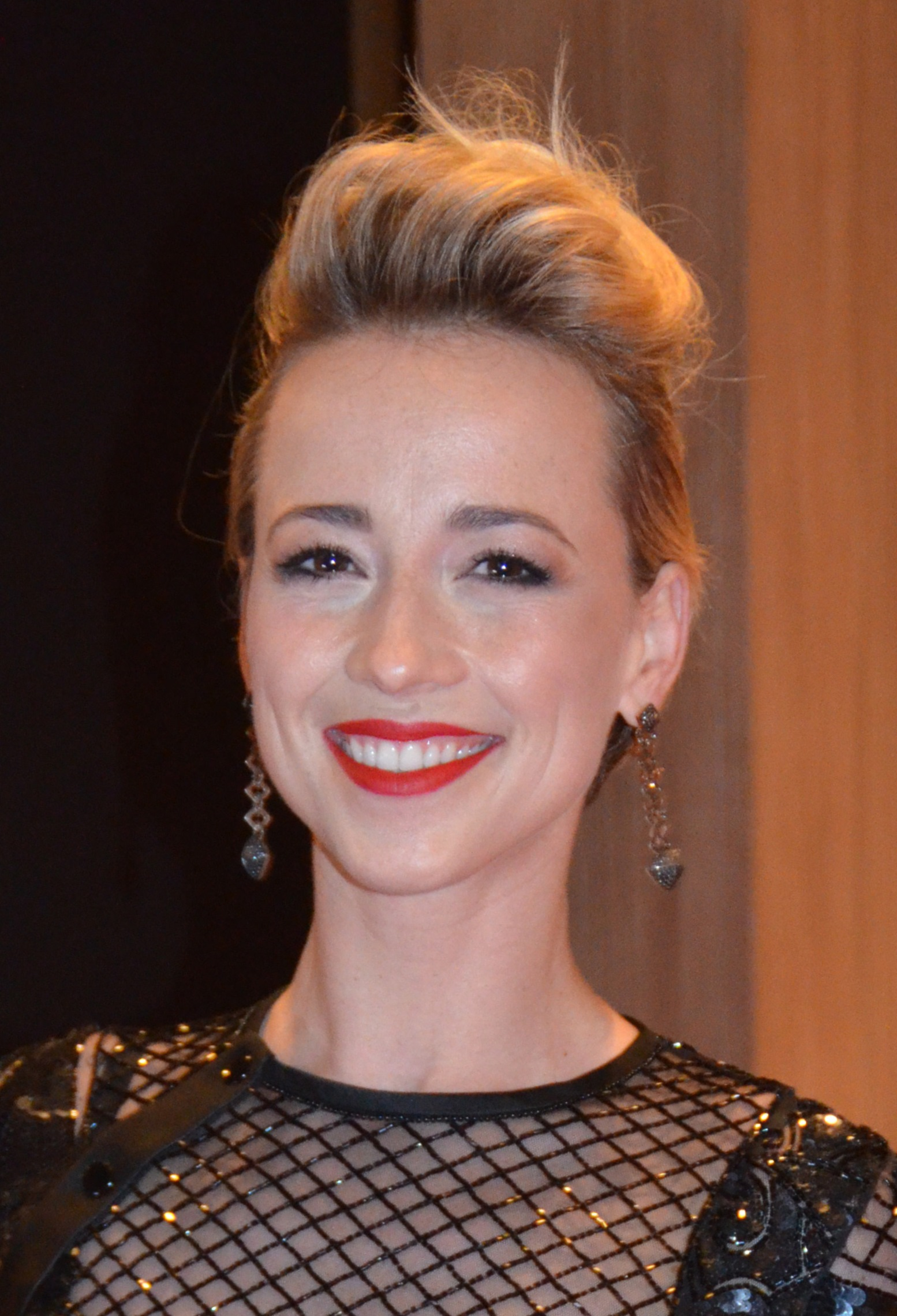
- Vanasse in December 2014
- Born: 24 November 1983 (age 42); Drummondville, Quebec, Canada
- Occupations: Actress; television personality
- Years active: 1999–present
- Known for: Set Me Free; Cardinal; Revenge; Pan Am; Polytechnique; The Traitors Canada; Bones of Crows
- Children: 1
- Awards: Prix Iris for Best Actress; Canadian Screen Award for Best Actress

Karine Vanasse (/kərin vənæs/, French: [kaʁin vanas]; born 24 November 1983) is a Canadian actress, who had roles in the films Polytechnique, Séraphin: Heart of Stone (Séraphin: un homme et son péché), Switch and Set Me Free (Emporte-moi). Internationally she is best known for her roles as Colette Valois in Pan Am, Margaux LeMarchal in Revenge and Lise Delorme in Cardinal. She is also the host of the Canadian reality television series, The Traitors Canada, as well as its French counterpart, Les Traîtres.

== Life and career ==
Vanasse was born in Drummondville, Quebec, the daughter of Conrad Vanasse, a council worker, and Renée (née Gamache), who was her manager at the beginning of her career. At the age of nine, Vanasse expressed her desire to sing or to act and she fulfilled that wish when she appeared in the teen show Club des 100 watts after winning a "lip sync" competition. It was then, with the help of her mother, that Vanasse began to audition for, and take part in, TV commercials and to play minor and supporting roles in various French Canadian TV movies.

In 1998, the production company now known as Motion International asked Vanasse to co-host a Québec-based children's science show, Les Débrouillards. Producer Lorraine Richard and director Léa Pool spotted her there, and offered Vanasse her first big break in the role of Hanna in Set Me Free (Emporte-moi) (1999), a story of a teenager trying to find her identity in a tormented family environment. The film was presented at forty festivals, and shown in twenty countries. Her performance was highly acclaimed both nationally and internationally and earned her the 2000 Best Actress Jutra Award.

Vanasse then played Lucie (the teenage love interest of Benoit Langlais's main character, Zac) in the controversial Québec TV series Deux frères (fr) (1999). Her character became very prominent in 2000–2001, and the debate stirred by the violent realism led her to become, together with Langlais, a spokesperson for the government-funded TV program Parler, c'est grandir, a broadcast aimed at youngsters from unstable backgrounds. In 2001, she applied for the ITHAKA program and took a six-month break in Greece to devote herself to travel and academics, after which she played Donalda in Charles Binamé's epic, Séraphin: Heart of Stone (Séraphin: un homme et son péché) (2002). She was cast as an FLQ terrorist in the 2006 miniseries October 1970 on CBC's English network. Vanasse appeared in such Canadian productions as Sans Elle, Ma fille, mon ange, and the Canadian/American/British mini-series Killer Wave.

In 2009, Vanasse was a producer and a cast member of the film Polytechnique, directed by Denis Villeneuve, which portrays the 1989 École Polytechnique massacre in Montréal. She won the Genie Award for Best Actress for her performance.

In 2011, Vanasse was cast as the French stewardess, Colette Valois, in the American-produced television series Pan Am, which was later cancelled after one season.

From January to April 2013, Vanasse was cast on the Quebec television series 30 Vies. In July 2013, Deadline Hollywood announced that Vanasse had joined the cast of ABC's Revenge as French businesswoman Margaux LeMarchal in the third season of the popular drama. During 2012 and 2013, Vanasse filmed the movies All the Wrong Reasons, Buddha's Little Finger and En solitaire.

From 2017 to 2020, Vanasse starred in the television series Cardinal, as detective Lise Delorme. It was the first time she had played a Québécoise character on English-language TV, rather than a character from France. At the 7th Canadian Screen Awards she won the award for Best Lead Actress in a Drama Program or Limited Series.

In 2023, Vanasse became the host of the Canadian reality series, The Traitors Canada. On June 6, 2023, it was announced that Bell Media has commissioned both English and French versions of the show. The French adaptation is called Les Traitres and is also hosted by Vanasse.

== Personal life ==
She was in a relationship with Remstar CEO Maxime Rémillard from 2006 to 2014.

On 21 April 2018, Vanasse announced via Instagram that she had given birth to her first child, a boy, with her now ex-boyfriend Hugues Harvey.

== Filmography ==
=== Film ===
Year	Title	Role	Notes
1999	Set Me Free (Emporte-moi)	Hanna	
2001	Games of the Heart	Alice	
2002	Séraphin: Heart of Stone (Séraphin: un homme et son péché)	Donalda Laloge	
2004	Head in the Clouds	Lisette	
2006	Without Her (Sans elle)	Camille	
2007	My Daughter, My Angel (Ma fille, mon ange)	Nathalie Dagenais	
2009	Polytechnique	Valérie	
2010	The Child Prodigy (L'Enfant prodige)	Camillette Mathieu	
2010	Rhonda's Party	Amy	Short film
2011	Blind Spot (Angle mort)	Stephanie	
2011	Midnight in Paris	Belle Époque Couple	
2011	Switch	Sophie Malaterre	
2011	I'm Yours	Daphne	
2011	French Immersion	Julie Tremblay	
2013	Scarlet	Narrator	Short film
2013	Turning Tide	Mag Embling	
2013	All the Wrong Reasons	Kate Ascher	
2014	X-Men: Days of Future Past	French Emergency Nurse	
2015	Buddha's Little Finger	Anna	
2015	The Forbidden Room	Florence Labadie	
2015	Paul à Québec	Nathalie Rouleau	Also producer
2017	Father and Guns 2 (De père en flic 2)	Alice	
2017	Worst Case, We Get Married (Et au pire, on se mariera)	Isabelle Saint-Pierre	
2017	Trench 11	Veronique	
2021	Felix and the Treasure of Morgäa (Félix et le trésor de Morgäa)	Morgäa	English and French versions
2022	Family Game (Arsenault et fils)	Émilie	
2022	Bones of Crows	Sister Ruth	
2023	Ru	Lisette Girard	

=== Television ===
Year	Title	Role	Notes
1999	2 frères	Lucie Chaput	TV series
2001	Mon meilleur ennemi	Franny Anderson	TV series
2006	Un homme mort	Kim Blanchard	TV series
2006	October 1970	Christine	TV miniseries
2006	Marie-Antoinette	Marie Antoinette	TV film
2008	Fred's Head	Fabienne Lajoie (voice)	French version
2011	Trauma	Fannie Comtois	Episode: "Plaisir et douleur"
2011	Killer Wave	Sophie Marleau	TV miniseries
2011–2012	Pan Am	Colette Valois	Main role (14 episodes)
2012	Scruples	Valentine O'Neill	TV film
2013–2015	Revenge	Margaux LeMarchal	Recurring role (season 3); Series regular (season 4)
2016–2018	Blue Moon	Justine Laurier	Main role
2017–2020	Cardinal	Lise Delorme	Main role
2019	God Friended Me	Audrey Grenelle	Recurring, season 2
2023	Hidden Assets	Frances Swann	Main role, season 2
2023	Plan B	Evelyn Landry	
2023-	The Traitors Canada	Herself	Host, English Canadian version of The Traitors reality show.
2024	Les Traîtres	Herself	Host, French Canadian version of The Traitors reality show.

== Awards and nominations ==
Year	Award	Category	Nominated work	Result
1999	1999 Toronto International Film Festival	Best Canadian First Feature Film - Special Jury Congratulation	Set Me Free	Won
2000	2nd Jutra Awards	Best Actress	Set Me Free	Won
2003	5th Jutra Awards	Best Actress	Seraphin: Heart of Stone	Won
2004	24th Genie Awards	Best Performance by an Actress in a Leading Role	Seraphin: Heart of Stone	Nominated
2008	10th Jutra Awards	Best Actress	My Daughter, My Angel	Nominated
2010	30th Genie Awards	Best Performance by an Actress in a Leading Role	Polytechnique	Won
2018	6th Canadian Screen Awards	Best Lead Actress, Drama Program or Limited Series	Cardinal	Nominated
2019	7th Canadian Screen Awards	Best Lead Actress, Drama Program or Limited Series	Cardinal	Won
2020	8th Canadian Screen Awards	Best Lead Actress, Drama Series	Cardinal	Won
2021	9th Canadian Screen Awards	Best Lead Actress, Drama Series	Cardinal	Nominated
