= 14 Days, 12 Nights =

2019 film

- French: 14 jours 12 nuits
- Directed by: Jean-Philippe Duval
- Written by: Marie Vien
- Produced by: Antonello Cozzolino
- Starring: Anne Dorval; Leanna Chea; François Papineau
- Cinematography: Yves Bélanger
- Edited by: Myriam Poirier
- Music by: Bertrand Chénier
- Production company: Attraction Images
- Distributed by: Les Films Séville
- Release date: October 30, 2019 (FCIAT)
- Running time: 99 minutes
- Country: Canada
- Languages: French; Vietnamese
- Box office: $122,806

14 Days, 12 Nights (French: 14 jours 12 nuits) is a 2019 Canadian drama film directed by Jean-Philippe Duval and written by Marie Vien. It stars Anne Dorval as Isabelle Brodeur, a Canadian woman whose grief over the accidental death of her adopted Vietnamese-born teenage daughter leads her to undertake a trip to Vietnam to meet Thuy Nguyen (Leanna Chea), the girl's birth mother.

== Release ==
The film premiered at the Abitibi-Témiscamingue International Film Festival in October 2019 and had its commercial premiere in February 2020.

== Accolades ==
Award	Date of ceremony	Category	Recipient(s)	Result	Ref(s)
Canadian Screen Awards	May 28, 2020	Best Supporting Actress	Leanna Chea	Nominated	
Minneapolis–Saint Paul International Film Festival	May 13–23, 2021	Audience Award – World Cinema		Won	
Prix Iris	June 10, 2020	Best Actress	Anne Dorval	Nominated	
Prix Iris	June 10, 2020	Best Cinematography	Yves Bélanger	Won	
Prix Iris	June 10, 2020	Best Editing	Myriam Poirier	Nominated	

== See also ==
- List of submissions to the 93rd Academy Awards for Best International Feature Film
- List of Canadian submissions for the Academy Award for Best International Feature Film
