= Pierre Falardeau =

Québécois director, pamphleteer and activist for Quebec independence

- Born: December 28, 1946; Montreal, Quebec, Canada
- Died: September 25, 2009 (aged 62); Montreal, Quebec, Canada
- Resting place: Notre Dame des Neiges Cemetery
- Education: Université de Montréal
- Occupations: Film director, screenwriter, writer, actor
- Years active: 1971–2009

Pierre Falardeau (French pronunciation: [pjɛʁ falaʁdo]; December 28, 1946 – September 25, 2009) was a Canadian film and documentary director, pamphleteer and noted activist for Quebec independence.

Falardeau wrote at least one book, Rien n'est plus précieux que la liberté et l'indépendance. He died on September 25, 2009, following a long battle with cancer. He was entombed at the Notre Dame des Neiges Cemetery in Montreal.

Following his death, he was the subject of the 2010 documentary film Falardeau.

== Political views ==
With regard to minorities, Falardeau stated he did not care whether someone was white, black, yellow or green with orange polka dots; those who supported independence he considered brothers and sisters, and those who did not were "the enemy".

Falardeau created some controversy during his career. For example, in 2006, a photograph surfaced of him at an August 2006 Montreal pro-Palestinian rally about the Israel-Lebanon conflict. The picture shows Falardeau with some young men and his friend and filmmaking partner Julien Poulin holding a Hezbollah flag. When asked to comment, Falardeau responded that he approached the men to understand why they supported Hezbollah, and that the flag belonged to the young men.

== Filmography ==
- Continuons le combat - 1971
- À mort - 1972
- Les canadiens sont là - 1973
- Le magra - 1975
- À force de courage - 1977
- Pea Soup - 1979
- Speak White - 1980
- Elvis Gratton - 1981
- Les vacances d'Elvis Gratton - 1983
- Pas encore Elvis Gratton! - 1985
- Elvis Gratton: Le king des kings - 1985
- The Party (Le Party) - 1990
- The Steak (Le Steak) - 1992
- Le temps des bouffons - 1993
- Octobre - 1994
- Elvis Gratton II: Miracle à Memphis - 1999
- February 15, 1839 (15 février 1839) - 2001
- Elvis Gratton 3: Le retour d'Elvis Wong - 2004
- Bob Gratton : Ma Vie, My Life - 2007-2009

== Awards ==
- Luc Perreault Award

== See also ==
- Cinema of Quebec
- Quebec sovereignty movement
