= Louise Portal =

Canadian actress, film director, singer and writer

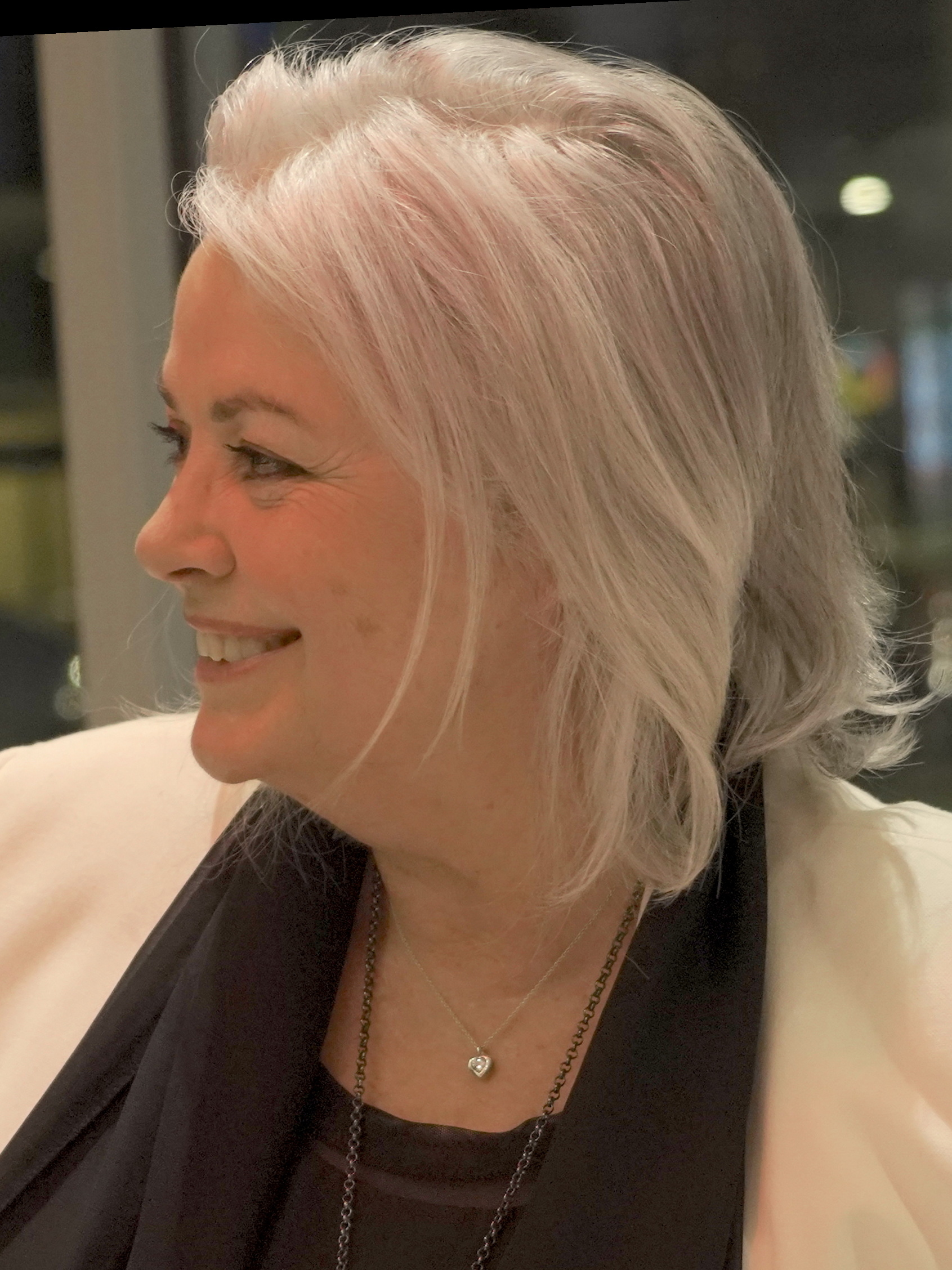
- Louise Portal in 2019
- Born: May 12, 1950 (age 76); Canada
- Occupations: Actress, film director singer, writer

Louise Portal (born May 12, 1950) is a Canadian actress, film director, singer and writer. She won the Genie Award for Best Supporting Actress for her role in the film The Decline of the American Empire, and was a nominee for Best Actress for Sous-sol (Not Me!).

== Career ==
Her other film roles have included Full Blast, Séraphin: Heart of Stone (Séraphin: un homme et son péché), The Barbarian Invasions (Les Invasions barbares), The Five of Us (Elles étaient cinq), The Happiness of Others (Le Bonheur des autres), Adrien (Le Garagiste), Paul à Québec, The Orphan Muses (Les Muses orphelines), Les Salopes, or the Naturally Wanton Pleasure of Skin and Cordélia.

She won the 1996 Prix Guy-L'Écuyer for Sous-sol.

== Personal life ==
Portal was born in Chicoutimi, Quebec. Her twin sister Pauline Lapointe (died 2010) was also an actress.

== Filmography ==
=== Film ===
Year	Title	Role	Notes
1972	Dream Life (La vie rêvée)	Andrée	
1973	Taureau	Gigi Gilbert	
1974	Lovely Sundays (Les beaux dimanches)	Dominique	
1974	The Klutz (Les deux pieds dans la même bottine)	Martine	
1979	A Scream from Silence (Mourir à tue-tête)	La comédienne	
1980	Cordélia	Cordelia Viau	
1982	Larose, Pierrot and Luce (Larose, Pierrot et la Luce)	Luce	
1984	Les fauves	Dany	
1986	The Decline of the American Empire (Le Déclin de l'empire américain)	Diane Leonard	
1986	Exit	Jeanne	
1987	Tinamer	Mère	
1989	My Best Pals (Mes meilleurs copains)	Bernadette Legranbois	
1993	Les amoureuses	Lea	
1996	Not Me! (Sous-sol)	Reine	
1999	The Long Winter (Quand je serai parti... vous vivrez encore)	Madame Duquet	
1999	The Big Snake of the World (Le Grand Serpent du monde)	Carmen	
1999	Memories Unlocked (Souvenirs intimes)	Pauline	
1999	Full Blast	Rose	
2000	Saint Jude	Georgie's Mother	
2000	The Orphan Muses (Les Muses orphelines)	Jacqueline Tanguay	
2000	Romain et Juliette		
2002	Alice's Odyssey (L'Odyssée d'Alice Tremblay)	Blanche-Neige	
2002	Séraphin: Heart of Stone (Séraphin: un homme et son péché)	Delphine Lacoste	
2002	Dangerous People	Johanne	
2003	The Barbarian Invasions (Les Invasions barbares)	Diane Leonard	
2004	The Five of Us (Elles étaient cinq)	Claire	
2005	Heading South (Vers le sud)	Sue	
2006	From My Window, Without a Home… (De ma fenêtre, sans maison...)	Sana	
2009	A Happy Man (Le Bonheur de Pierre)	Louise Dolbec	
2009	Angel at Sea (Un ange à la mer)	Jaqueline	
2010	He Shoots, He Scores (Lance et compte)	Mireille Bellavance	
2011	The Happiness of Others (Le bonheur des autres)	Louise	
2014	The Wolves (Les loups)	Maria	
2015	The Kind Words	Isabelle Moretti	
2015	Adrien (Le Garagiste)	Marie	
2015	Paul à Québec	Lisette	
2018	Les Salopes, or the Naturally Wanton Pleasure of Skin (Les salopes ou le sucre naturel de la peau)	Margot	
2018	Everything Outside	Louise	
2019	And the Birds Rained Down (Il pleuvait des oiseaux)	Geneviève	
2020	The Mother Eagle (Le Sang du pélican)	Mère Jouve	
2021	Confessions of a Hitman (Confessions)	Jacinthe Gallant	
2024	A Christmas Storm (Le Cyclone de Noël)		

=== Television ===
Year	Title	Role	Notes
1974	La p'tite semaine	Nicole Lajoie	1 episode
1975	Y'a pas de problème	Jocelyne	1 episode
1976	Du tac au tac	Suzy	Episode: "Une descente réussie"
1978	Terre humaine	Isabelle Dantin	6 episodes
1980	L'Ingénieux Don Quichotte	Isabella	1 episode
1987	Bonjour docteur	Julie	1 episode
1994	Miséricorde	Soeur Thérèse	1 episode
1995	Les grands procès	Madame Caron	Episode: "L'affaire Nogaret"
1996	L'histoire du samedi	Julie Roussel	Episode: "Mayday"
1997	Lobby	Geena Shrier	5 episodes
1997	Le volcan tranquille	Françoise Dessables	1 episode
1997	Diva	Doris Tremblay	1 episode
2001	Emma	Madeleine Miro	1 episode
2001	Rivière-des-Jérémie	Ginette Lalande	1 episode
2001	Fortier	Esther Charest	2 episodes
2002	Tabou	Manon	1 episode
2004	H_{2}O	Marie Lavigne	2 episodes
2007–2008	Nos étés	Laure-Lou Meunier	4 episodes
2010	Prozac, La Maladie Du Bonheur	Mireille	9 episodes
2011	30 vies	Louise Labelle	3 episodes
2011–2015	19-2	Marie-Louise	22 episodes
2012	He Shoots, He Scores	Mireille Bellavance	6 episodes
2012–2014	Toute la vérité	Marie-Louise Régimbald	16 episodes
2015	Lance et Compte	Mireille Bellavance	10 episodes
2016	Les beaux malaises	Élyse	Episode: "Les bonnes vibrations"
2017	Cheval Serpent	Odile Gauthier	4 episodes
2017–2019	Trop	Carole	6 episodes
