= Michel Arcand =

Canadian film editor

- Born: 1949; Quebec, Canada

Michel Arcand (born 1949) is a Canadian film editor from Val-d'Or, Quebec. He is a three-time Genie Award winner for Best Editing.

== Awards ==
Award	Date of ceremony	Category	Work	Result	Ref(s)
Genie Awards	1988	Best Editing	Night Zoo (Un Zoo la nuit)	Won	
Genie Awards	1989	Best Editing	Straight for the Heart (À corps perdu)	Nominated	
Genie Awards	1991	Best Editing	The Party (Le Party)	Nominated	
Genie Awards	1992	Best Editing	Léolo	Won	
Genie Awards	1994	Best Editing	Desire in Motion (Mouvements du désir)	Nominated	
Genie Awards	1995	Best Editing	Eldorado	Nominated	
Genie Awards	2000	Best Editing	The Art of War	Nominated	
Genie Awards	2006	Best Editing	The Rocket	Won	
Quebec Cinema (Jutra/Iris) Awards	2000	Best Editing	Set Me Free (Emporte-moi)	Nominated	
Quebec Cinema (Jutra/Iris) Awards	2006	Best Editing	The Rocket (Maurice Richard)	Nominated	
Quebec Cinema (Jutra/Iris) Awards	2008	Best Editing	Shake Hands with the Devil	Nominated	
Quebec Cinema (Jutra/Iris) Awards	2010	Best Editing	Love and Savagery	Nominated	
Quebec Cinema (Jutra/Iris) Awards	2011	Best Editing	The Last Escape (La Dernière Fugue)	Nominated	
Quebec Cinema (Jutra/Iris) Awards	2019	Best Editing	La Bolduc	Nominated	
