= Julien Poulin =

Canadian actor (1946–2025)

- Born: April 20, 1946; Montreal, Quebec, Canada
- Died: January 4, 2025 (aged 78)
- Occupations: Film director, film producer, actor
- Years active: 1973–2025

Julien Poulin (French pronunciation: [ʒyljɛ̃ pulɛ̃]; April 20, 1946 – January 4, 2025) was a Canadian actor, film director, screenwriter and film producer. He portrayed numerous roles in several popular Quebec films and series.

== Elvis Gratton films ==
His most memorable role was Elvis Gratton, in which his character impersonates rock and roll icon Elvis Presley. This series of films appeared between 1981 and 2004. The most recent of these films were Elvis Gratton II: Miracle à Memphis, filmed in 1999, in which Elvis was resuscitated from the first film of the series, and Elvis Gratton 3: Le retour d'Elvis Wong, which was filmed in 2004.

He also co-directed some of the films along with Pierre Falardeau.

== Other roles ==
In addition to the Elvis Gratton films, Poulin also played several main and supporting roles in other films and television series including The Crime of Ovide Plouffe (Le Crime d'Ovide Plouffe) in 1984, Lance et Compte in 1986, The Party (Le Party) in 1990, Virginie in 1996, Jasmine and Omertà 2, la loi du silence in 1997, Les orphelins de Duplessis and Le Dernier souffle in 1999, February 15, 1839 (15 février 1839) and Fortier in 2001, Séraphin: Heart of Stone (Séraphin: un homme et son péché) in 2002 and Le Négociateur 1 and Le Négociateur 2 in 2005–2006.

Poulin portrays Gaétan Langlois in the award-winning show Minuit, le soir.

In 2007–2009, Poulin took the title role of Bob Gratton in the new TQS series Bob Gratton: Ma Vie, My Life.

Poulin also played in Fred Pellerin's Babine.

Poulin played a role in episode 20 as Jessica's father in Radio-Canada's Unité 9 (2016).

== Off-screen ==
Poulin was the spokesperson for Opération Nez rouge in 1996, a campaign against drinking and driving during the holidays.

== Selected filmography ==
- You Are Warm, You Are Warm (Tu brûles... tu brûles...) - 1973
- Réjeanne Padovani - 1973: Mike Delvecchio
- The Mob (La gammick) - 1975: Angelo
- Bernie and the Gang (Ti-mine, Bernie pis la gang...) - 1977
- M'en revenant par les épinettes - 1977: Pierre
- Elvis Gratton - 1981: Bob 'Elvis' Gratton
- The Years of Dreams and Revolt (Les années de rêves) - 1984: Photographe du mariage
- The Alley Cat (Le Matou) - 1985: Rosaro Gladu
- Elvis Gratton: Le king des kings - 1985: Bob Gratton
- Pas encore Elvis Gratton! - 1985: Bob Gratton
- Henri - 1987: Begin
- Gaspard et fil$ - 1988: Charles
- Unfaithful Mornings (Les matins infidèles) - 1989: Le patron du snack-bar
- In the Belly of the Dragon (Dans le ventre du dragon) - 1989: Gardien guerite
- How to Make Love to a Negro Without Getting Tired Comment faire l'amour avec un nègre sans se fatiguer) - 1989: Pusher #1
- The Gunrunner - 1989: First intruder
- The Party (Le Party) - 1990: Boyer
- Solo - 1991: Fernand
- Ma soeur, mon amour - 1992: L'épicier
- Doublures - 1993
- The Ear of a Deaf Man (L'oreille d'un sourd) - 1993: Vic Joyal
- The Last Breath (Le dernier souffle) - 1999: Norman Vaillancourt
- Elvis Gratton II: Miracle à Memphis - 1999: Bob 'Elvis' Gratton / Himself
- Pin-Pon: Le film - 1999: Oncle Mimile
- Heaven (Le petit ciel) - 2000: Jesus Christ
- Nuremberg - 2000: Dr. Robert Ley
- February 15, 1839 (Nouvelle-France) - 2001: Curé Marier
- Karmina 2 - 2001: Vincent Proulx
- Séraphin: Heart of Stone (Séraphin: un homme et son péché) - 2001: Père Ovide
- Taking Lives - 2004: Québec City Inspector
- Machine Gun Molly (Monica la mitraille) - 2004: Loignon enquêteur
- Elvis Gratton 3: Le retour d'Elvis Wong - 2004: Bob 'Elvis' Gratton
- Missing Victor Pellerin (Rechercher Victor Pellerin) - 2006
- Bob Gratton: Ma Vie, My Life - 2007-2009: Bob Gratton
- Babine - 2008: Le Vieux Curé
- The Girl in the White Coat - 2011: Elise's Father
- Camion - 2012: Germain
- Small Blind (La mise à l'aveugle) - 2012: Michel
- Redemption - 2013: Gilles Mercier
- Miraculum - 2014: Raymond
- The Bunker - 2014: Guerard
- Paul à Québec - 2015: Paul's father
- Kiss Me Like a Lover (Embrasse-moi comme tu m'aimes) - 2016: Sergent Boileau
- Les Pays d'en haut - 2016-2019: Père Laloge
- Mad Dog Labine - 2018 (voice)
- Family Game (Arsenault et fils) - 2022: Armand Arsenault
