= Jean-Philippe Duval =

Jean-Philipe Duval
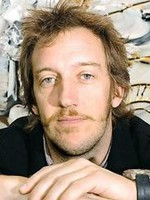
- Born: 1968 (age 57–58); Quebec City, Quebec
- Occupations: film and television director
- Years active: 1990s-present
- Notable work: Matroni and Me, Through the Mist, 14 Days, 12 Nights

Jean-Philippe Duval (born 1968) is a Canadian film and television director from Quebec City, Quebec. He is most noted for his 1999 films Matroni and Me (Matroni et moi), for which he received Jutra Award nominations for Best Director and Best Screenplay at the 2nd Jutra Awards, and a Genie Award nomination for Best Adapted Screenplay at the 20th Genie Awards, and his 2009 film Through the Mist (Dédé, à travers les brumes), which received Jutra nominations for both Best Director and Best Screenplay at the 12th Jutra Awards.

At the 2nd Jutra Awards, his documentary film Light of the Snow Geese (Lumière des oiseaux) was also a nominee for Best Documentary Film.

His 2019 film 14 Days, 12 Nights (14 jours 12 nuits) was selected as the Canadian entry for the Best International Feature Film at the 93rd Academy Awards.

== Filmography ==
=== Films ===
- La nuit tous les chats sont gris - 1990
- Soho - 1994
- Matroni and Me (Matroni et moi) - 1999
- Through the Mist (Dédé, à travers les brumes) - 2009
- Wild Run: The Legend (Chasse-Galerie: La Légende) - 2016
- 9 (9, le film) - 2016
- 14 Days, 12 Nights (14 jours 12 nuits) - 2019

=== Documentary ===
- La Vie a du charme - 1993
- L'Odyssée baroque - 1994
- Light of the Snow Geese (Lumière des oiseaux) - 1999
- Marie, mère des apparitions - 2001
- WOW II - 2001
- Les Réfugiés de la planète bleue - 2006
- Au Québec avec Tintin - 2015

=== Television ===
- L'École de danse - 2002
- Marché Jean-Talon - 2003
- États-humains - 2004-07
- Martin sur la route - 2007
- Unité 9 - 2012
