= The Last Breath (1999 film) =

Canadian drama film

- Le Dernier souffle
- Directed by: Richard Ciupka
- Screenplay by: Joanne Arseneau
- Produced by: Jacques Bonin; Claude Veillet; Lucie Veillet; Sylvie Roy
- Starring: Luc Picard; Julien Poulin; Serge Houde
- Cinematography: Steve Danyluk
- Edited by: Glenn Berman
- Music by: Gaëtan Gravel; Serge LaForest
- Distributed by: Lions Gate
- Release date: March 26, 1999
- Country: Canada
- Language: French
- Budget: $3.8 million
- Box office: $0.4 million (Canada)

The Last Breath (French: Le Dernier souffle) is a Canadian drama film, released in 1999. Written by Joanne Arseneau and directed by Richard Ciupka, the film stars Luc Picard as Laurent Vaillancourt, a police officer from Montreal who travels to Arkansas to solve the murder of his brother Martin (Michel Goyette).

The film's cast also includes Julien Poulin, Serge Houde, Anik Matern and Paul Ahmarani.

== Awards ==
The film garnered three Genie Award nominations at the 20th Genie Awards in 2000, including Best Overall Sound (Michel Descombes, Jo Caron, Gavin Fernandes and Michel Charron), Best Sound Editing (Louis Dupire, Diane Boucher, Jérôme Décarie, Christian Rivest and Alice Wright) and Best Original Song (Daniel Bélanger).

Poulin won the Prix Jutra for Best Supporting Actor. The film was also nominated for Best Film, Best Actor (Picard), Best Sound and Best Supporting Actress (Linda Singer).
