= Pierre Gang =

Canadian film and television director

Pierre Gang is a Canadian film and television director, best known for his 1996 feature film Not Me! (Sous-sol) and the television miniseries More Tales of the City and Further Tales of the City.

His other credits have included a 1999 telefilm adaptation of The Legend of Sleepy Hollow, the miniseries Samuel et la mer and En thérapie, the television film Selling Innocence and the feature film Black Eyed Dog.

He won a Genie Award for Best Original Screenplay at the 17th Genie Awards in 1996 for Sous-sol.

Since 2008, he has been programming director for TV5 Québec Canada.
