= Gavin Fernandes =

Gavin Fernandes, CAS, is a re-recording mixer based in Montreal, Quebec. He is a member of the Academy of Canadian Cinema and Television, the American Academy of Television and the Cinema Audio Society (CAS).

== Recognition ==
- 2023 Cinema Eye Award Best Achievement in Overall Sound - Fire of Love - Nominated (Shared with Patrice Leblanc)
- 2022 Can. Screen Award Best Achievement in Overall Sound - Brain Freeze - Nominated (Shared with Pierre Bertrand, Jocelyn Caron, Giuseppe Petrella)
- 2020 Can. Screen Award Best Achievement in Overall Sound - Jouliks - Nominated (Shared with Normand Lapierre)
- 2017 Emmy Award Best Achievement in Overall Sound - Big Little Lies - Nominated (Shared with Louis Gignac, Brendan Beebe)
- 2017 CAS Award Best Achievement in Sound Mixing - Big Little Lies - Nominated (Shared with Louis Gignac, Brendan Beebe)
- 2016 Iris Award Best Achievement in Overall Sound - Bon Cop, Bad Cop - Nominated (Shared with Louis Gignac)
- 2009 Jutra Award for Best Achievement in Overall Sound - Babine - Won (Shared with Olivier Calvert, Louis Gignac, Dominique Chartrand)
- 2008 Genie Award for Best Achievement in Overall Sound - Shake Hands with the Devil - Nominee (shared with Eric Fitz, Jocelyn Caron, Benoit Leduc)
- 2007 Genie Award for Best Achievement in Overall Sound - Bon Cop, Bad Cop - Won (shared Dominique Chartrand, Nathalie Morin, Pierre Paquet)
- 2007 Jutra Award for Best Sound (Meilleur Son) - Bon Cop, Bad Cop - Nominated (shared with Dominique Chartrand, Christian Rivest, Pierre Paquet)
- 2005 Genie Award for Best Achievement in Overall Sound - The Last Tunnel (Le Dernier tunnel) - Won (shared with Dominique Chartrand, Pierre Paquet)
- 2005 Genie Award for Best Achievement in Overall Sound - Head in the Clouds - Nominated (shared with Pierre Blain, Jocelyn Caron, Michel Descombes)
- 2004 Genie Award for Best Achievement in Overall Sound - The Barbarian Invasions - Nominated (shared with Michel Descombes, Patrick Rousseau)
- 2003 Genie Award Best Achievement in Overall Sound - Inside (Histoire de pen) - Nominated (shared with Bobby O'Malley, Philippe Pelletier)
- 2003 Jutra Award for Best Sound (Meilleur Son) - Inside (Histoire de pen) - Nominated (shared with Bobby O'Malley, Denis Saindon, Philippe Pelletier)
- 2003 Jutra Award for Best Sound (Meilleur Son) - Alice's Odyssey (L'Odyssée d'Alice Tremblay) - Nominated (shared with Yvon Benoît, Marie-Claude Gagné)
- 2002 Jutra Award for Best Sound (Meilleur Son) - Wedding Night (Nuit de noces) - Nominated (shared with Claude Lahaie, Marie-Claude Gagné)
- 2000 Genie Award for Best Overall Sound - The Last Breath (Le Dernier souffle) - Nominated (shared with Michel Descombes, Jocelyn Caron, Michel Charron)
- 2000 Jutra Award for Best Sound (Meilleur Son) - The Last Breath (Le Dernier souffle) - Nominated (shared with Michel Charron, Jocelyn Caron, Bruno Ruffolo, Louis Dupire, Michel Descombes)
- 1996 Genie Award for Best Achievement in Overall Sound - Black List (Liste noire) - Nominated (shared with Luc Boudrias, Daniel Masse, Michel Descombes)
