= Matroni and Me =

- French: Matroni et moi
- Directed by: Jean-Philippe Duval
- Written by: Jean-Philippe Duval; Alexis Martin (play)
- Produced by: Roger Frappier; Luc Vandal
- Starring: Alexis Martin; Pierre Lebeau; Guylaine Tremblay; Gary Boudreault
- Cinematography: André Turpin
- Edited by: Alai Baril
- Music by: Benoît Charest; Maxime Morin
- Production company: Max Films
- Distributed by: Alliance Atlantis
- Release date: October 8, 1999
- Running time: 101 minutes
- Country: Canada
- Language: French

Matroni and Me (French: Matroni et moi) is a Canadian comedy film, directed by Jean-Philippe Duval and released in 1999.

Based on a theatrical play by Alexis Martin, the film stars Martin as Gilles, an academic who meets Guylaine (Guylaine Tremblay) while on vacation in Ogunquit. However, when he tries to connect with her after they return home to Montreal, her brother Bob (Gary Boudreault) draws him into the orbit of Matroni (Pierre Lebeau), a local Mafia boss. The film's cast also includes Maude Guérin, Pierre Curzi, Alex Ivanovici, Pierre Harel and Tony Conte.

== Awards ==
The film received two Genie Award nominations at the 20th Genie Awards, for Best Adapted Screenplay (Duval, Martin) and Best Editing (Alain Baril), and seven Jutra Award nominations at the 2nd Jutra Awards, for Best Director (Duval), Best Actor (Lebeau), Best Actress (Tremblay), Best Supporting Actor (Boudreault), Best Supporting Actress (Guérin), Best Screenplay (Duval, Martin) and Best Cinematography (André Turpin).
