= Set Me Free (1999 film) =

1999 film by Léa Pool

- Theatrical release poster
- French: Emporte-moi
- Directed by: Léa Pool
- Written by: Léa Pool; Nancy Huston; Isabelle Raynauld
- Produced by: Louis Laverdière
- Starring: Karine Vanasse; Miki Manojlovic; Pascale Bussières; Alexandre Mérineau; Nancy Huston
- Cinematography: Jeanne Lapoirie
- Edited by: Michel Arcand
- Music by: Robyn Schulkowsky
- Production companies: Cité-Amérique; Catpics; Haut et Court
- Distributed by: Equinoxe Films (Canada); Haut et Court (France); Columbus Film (Switzerland)
- Release dates: 12 February 1999 (Canada); 9 April 1999 (Switzerland); 28 July 1999 (France)
- Running time: 94 minutes
- Countries: Canada; France; Switzerland
- Language: French

Set Me Free (French: Emporte-moi) is a 1999 Canadian coming-of-age drama film by Léa Pool and starring Karine Vanasse. It tells the story of Hanna, a girl struggling with her sexuality and the depression of both her parents as she goes through puberty in Quebec in 1963. The film heavily references the French new-wave film Vivre sa vie by Jean-Luc Godard.

The film won critical acclaim and several awards, both for Pool and Vanasse, including being named the year's best Canadian feature by the Toronto Film Critics Association. Set Me Free was announced as Canada's submission for the Academy Award for Best International Feature Film at the 72nd Academy Awards, but it was not nominated.

== Plot ==
In 1963, 13-year old girl Hanna is living on a farm in rural Quebec with her grandparents and uncle (who apparently has a developmental disability such as Down Syndrome) when she gets her first period. She then interrupts family dinner when her father calls her, much to her grandmother's annoyance. The onset of puberty (and her grandmother's relatively non-supportive explanation of it), as well as hearing from her father, trigger her decision to return to her parents in Montreal.

Hanna is welcomed back by her brother, Paul, to the small family apartment, where the rent is often overdue, sometimes paid with cash raised from pawning household items. Hanna's father is an aspiring poet, a Polish Jew who survived the Holocaust in France. Although overbearing and abusive to his wife and children, he can show love and tenderness as well. Hoping to connect with Hanna, he encourages her to read The Diary of Anne Frank and speaks about his former wife who was killed by the Nazis. Hanna's mother is depressive, working overtime in a sewing factory to make ends meet but also spending hours at home typing her husband's poems. Though often angry with him, Hanna's mother also confesses that she needs him.

While wrestling with her changing body and emotions, Hanna sneaks into a movie theater showing Jean-Luc Godard's Vivre Sa Vie (My Life to Live) and is entranced by Nana, the character played by Anna Karina, and her philosophy of personal responsibility. On her first day at a new school, Hanna sets herself apart from other students by admitting that her parents are not married and that she does not consider herself either Jewish, after her father, or Catholic, after her mother. Her teacher later comes to her defense when a classmate taunts Hanna on the playground with anti-Semitic slurs. The teacher physically resembles Karina, and Hanna is smitten with her. The teacher admires Hanna's independence but advises her to develop her own view of life and not to rely on a role model.

Hanna adopts poses and clothing choices from Karina in Godard's film, while continuing to explore her feelings and sexuality. She attends a dance with a school friend, Laura, and the two wind up kissing. Later, she introduces Laura to Paul and the three spend time together while attempting to come to terms with their feelings. Hanna herself seems increasingly isolated.

After a quarrel with her husband, Hanna's mother attempts suicide. Visiting her in the hospital, Hanna is distraught when the sedated woman is unresponsive to her pleas for connection. When her father sends Hanna to a baker to get some bread, the baker takes her to his back kitchen, gropes her, and then gives her both the bread and some money.

Following a dispute between Hanna and her father, she and Paul leave home, but she does not return to the apartment. Wandering into the city's red-light district, she befriends a lost dog but also adopts the pose and attitudes of a prostitute like Karina's character. When a man picks Hanna up and takes her to a cheap hotel room, she changes her mind as he tries to force himself on her and flees.

Driven almost to despair, Hanna collapses on her teacher's doorstep, where she and the dog are discovered in the morning. Returning to the family apartment, Hanna's father welcomes her back with a dinner prepared. Having returned to school, Hanna at the season's end is loaned a small movie camera by her teacher, who assures her that she will soon learn how to use it. The film ends with shots from the camera of Hanna's mother as they head to the grandparents' house for the summer.

== Cast ==
- Karine Vanasse as Hanna
- Pascale Bussières as Hanna's mother
- Miki Manojlovic as Hanna's father
- Alexandre Mérineau as Paul, Hanna's brother
- Charlotte Christeler as Laura
- Nancy Huston as Teacher
- Monique Mercure as Hanna's grandmother
- Jacques Galipeau as Hanna's grandfather
- Carl Hennebert-Faulkner as Martin
- Michel Albert as security guard

== Reception ==
=== Box office ===
Emporte-Moi, released in the United States on a single screen, grossed $74,052 at the box-office.

=== Critical response ===
Emporte-Moi was well received by critics. Set Me Free has an approval rating of 83% on review aggregator website Rotten Tomatoes, based on 18 reviews, and an average rating of 7.3/10. Metacritic assigned the film a weighted average score of 80 out of 100, based on 16 critics, indicating "generally favorable reviews". Critics generally praised the film's bittersweet tone and the performances, particularly that of Vanasse. Still, some, such as Roger Ebert, criticised the film's ending for seeming somewhat forced.

On Autostraddle’s list of the 200 Best Lesbian, Bisexual & Queer Movies of All Time, Set Me Free was ranked at number 34.

=== Awards and nominations ===
Emporte-Moi received various awards. Pool earned Genie nominations for Best Director and Best Screenplay, and the film was awarded the Toronto Film Critics Association Award for Best Canadian Film of 1999. At the Toronto International Film Festival, Emporte-moi was awarded the Special Jury Citation for Best Canadian Feature Film, and Vanasse earned the Special Jury Congratulation for her work on the film. It also received four Jutra awards, for Best Actress (Vanasse), Supporting Actress (Bussières), Art Direction and Most Successful Film Outside Quebec, and was nominated in four other categories.

Internationally, the film received the Swiss Film Prize and was nominated for the Golden Bear at the 49th Berlin International Film Festival. It was also honoured at international film festivals in the United States, Italy, Belgium, Bosnia, and Spain.

== See also ==
- List of submissions to the 72nd Academy Awards for Best Foreign Language Film
- List of Canadian submissions for the Academy Award for Best Foreign Language Film
- List of LGBT films directed by women
