= List of Canadian films of 2010 =

This is a list of Canadian films which were released in 2010:

Title	Director	Cast	Genre	Notes
2 Frogs in the West (2 frogs dans l'ouest)	Dany Papineau	Mirianne Brulé	Comedy drama	
7 Days (Les 7 jours du Talion)	Podz	Rémy Girard, Claude Legault, Fanny Mallette	Thriller	
10½	Podz	Claude Legault, Robert Naylor	Drama	Prix Jutra – Actor (Legault)
Above the Knee	Greg Atkins	Stephen Bogaert, Allen Altman, Naomi Snieckus	Short comedy	
Act of Dishonour	Nelofer Pazira	Marina Golbahari	Drama	Set in Afghanistan
Altitude	Kaare Andrews	Mike Dopud, Jessica Lowndes, Julianna Guill	Horror	Direct to DVD
Amazon Falls	Katrin Bowen	April Telek, William B. Davis, Anna Mae Routledge, Zak Santiago	Drama	
Arctic Blast	Brian Trenchard-Smith	Michael Shanks	Disaster film	Canada-Australia co-production
Aurelie Laflamme's Diary (Le Journal d'Aurélie Laflamme)	Christian Laurence	Marianne Verville, Geneviève Chartrand, Aliocha Schneider	Comedy drama	
The Bad Idea Reunion	Daniel Cockburn	Minna Haller; London Angelis (voice)	Experimental short	Made for the TIFF Talent Lab
The Bait (L'Appât)	Yves Simoneau	Guy A. Lepage, Rachid Badouri, Serge Dupire	Crime comedy	
The Bang Bang Club	Steven Silver	Ryan Phillippe, Taylor Kitsch, Malin Akerman	Drama	Canada-South Africa co-production
Barney's Version	Richard J. Lewis	Paul Giamatti, Dustin Hoffman, Rosamund Pike, Minnie Driver, Rachelle Lefevre, Scott Speedman, Bruce Greenwood	Comedy drama adaptation of the Mordecai Richler novel	Canada-Italy co-production
A Beginner's Guide to Endings	Jonathan Sobol	Harvey Keitel, Jason Jones, Paulo Costanzo, Scott Caan, J.K. Simmons, Wendy Crewson	Black comedy	
Beyond the Black Rainbow	Panos Cosmatos	Michael Rogers, Eva Allan, Scott Hylands, Marilyn Norry	Sci-fi fantasy	
Casino Jack	George Hickenlooper	Kevin Spacey, Kelly Preston, Barry Pepper, Jon Lovitz, Rachelle Lefevre, Graham Greene	Biodrama	A Canadian film about Jack Abramoff
Cave of Forgotten Dreams	Werner Herzog		Documentary about the Chauvet Cave in southern France that contains the oldest human-painted images yet discovered.	A Canada-France-U.K.-German co-production made with U.S. financing shot in 3D.
Cell 213	Stephen T. Kay	Bruce Greenwood, Eric Balfour, Michael Rooker	Drama	
The Child Prodigy (L'Enfant prodige)	Luc Dionne	Guillaume Lebon, Patrick Drolet, Marc Labrèche, Macha Grenon, Karine Vanasse	Drama	
City of Shadows (La Cité)	Kim Nguyen	Jean-Marc Barr, Claude Legault, Pierre Lebeau	Drama	
The Comeback (Cabotins)	Alain DesRochers	Rémy Girard, Dorothée Berryman, Yves Jacques	Comedy	Prix Jutra – Supporting Actress (Berryman)
Crying Out (À l'origine d'un cri)	Robin Aubert	Jean Lapointe, Michel Barrette, Patrick Hivon	Road movie	Prix Jutra – Supporting Actor (Lapointe)
Curling	Denis Côté	Emmanuel Bilodeau, Philomène Bilodeau	Drama	
Daydream Nation	Michael Goldbach	Kat Dennings, Reece Thompson, Josh Lucas	Drama	
Dead Lines	Louis Bélanger	Jeri Ryan, Anthony Lemke, Tiera Skovbye	Thriller	Made for television
Diary of an Aid Worker (Journal d'un coopérant)	Robert Morin	Robert Morin	Drama	
Die	Dominic James	Elias Koteas, Emily Hampshire, John Pyper-Ferguson, Caterina Murino, Katie Boland	Thriller	
Dog Pound	Kim Chapiron	Adam Butcher, Shane Kippel	Drama, thriller	Direct to DVD
The Enemy Lines (Les lignes ennemies)	Denis Côté		Drama	
Exit 67 (Sortie 67)	Jephté Bastien	Henri Pardo, Natacha Noël, Benz Antoine	Crime drama	Winner of the Claude Jutra Award
Face Time (Le Baiser du barbu)	Yves Pelletier	David Savard, Isabelle Blais, Ricardo Trogi	Romantic comedy	
Faith, Fraud & Minimum Wage	George Mihalka	Callum Keith Rennie, Martha MacIsaac	Drama	
Falardeau	Carmen Garcia, German Gutierrez	Pierre Falardeau	Documentary	
Fathers & Sons	Carl Bessai	Jay Brazeau, Vincent Gale, Tyler Labine	Comedy	
File Under Miscellaneous	Jeff Barnaby	Glen Gould, Arthur Holden	Science fiction	
File 13 (Filière 13)	Patrick Huard	Claude Legault, Paul Doucet	Buddy comedy	
Flawed	Andrea Dorfman		National Film Board Animated short	Premiered at Hot Docs
Foodland	Adam Smoluk	James Clayton, Ross McMillan, Kim Poirier	Comedy	Developed with the National Screen Institute's "Features First" program
Force of Nature: The David Suzuki Movie	Sturla Gunnarsson	David Suzuki	Documentary	TIFF – People’s Choice Award for Best Documentary
Frankie and Alice	Geoffrey Sax	Halle Berry, Stellan Skarsgård, Matt Frewer	Drama	
Fubar II	Michael Dowse	Dave Lawrence, Paul Spence, Andy Sparacino, Terra Hazelton	Mockumentary/Comedy	A sequel to the 2002 film
Good Neighbours	Jacob Tierney	Jay Baruchel, Scott Speedman, Emily Hampshire	Drama	Based on a novel by novel Chyrstine Broulliet
The Gospel According to the Blues	Thom Fitzgerald	Jackie Richardson, Richard Chevolleau, Karen Robinson	Drama	
GravyTrain	April Mullen	Jennifer Dale	Comedy	
Grown Up Movie Star	Adriana Maggs	Shawn Doyle, Tatiana Maslany, Jonny Harris	Drama	Sundance Film Festival – Special Jury Prize for Breakout Performance (Maslany)
Gunless	William Phillips	Paul Gross, Sienna Guillory, Dustin Milligan, Callum Keith Rennie, Graham Greene	Western, comedy	
The Hair of the Beast (Le Poil de la bête)	Philippe Gagnon	Guillaume Lemay-Thivierge, Gilles Renaud, Patrice Robitaille, Antoine Bertrand	Comedy horror	
Hard Core Logo 2	Bruce McDonald	Bruce McDonald, Care Failure, Julian Richings, Adrian Dorval	Punk, faux documentary	A sequel to the 1996 film.
The Heart that Beats (Ce cœur qui bat)	Philippe Lesage		Documentary	
Heartbeats (Les Amours imaginaires)	Xavier Dolan	Xavier Dolan, Anne Dorval, Monia Chokri, Niels Schneider, Anne Dorval	Drama	Cannes Film Festival – Regards Jeunes Prix
Higglety Pigglety Pop!	Chris Lavis & Maciek Szczerbowski	Meryl Streep (voice)	Stop-motion animation produced with the National Film Board and Warner Home Video	Based on the book by Maurice Sendak
The High Cost of Living	Deborah Chow	Zach Braff, Isabelle Blais	Drama	TIFF – Best Canadian First Feature
The High Level Bridge	Trevor Anderson		Short documentary	
High Life	Gary Yates	Timothy Olyphant, Joe Anderson, Rossif Sutherland	Black comedy	
I Was a Child of Holocaust Survivors	Ann Marie Fleming		National Film Board animated short	Based on the graphic novel by Bernice Eisenstein
In the Name of the Family	Shelley Saywell		Documentary	
Incendies	Denis Villeneuve	Lubna Azabal, Mélissa Désormeaux-Poulin, Maxim Gaudette, Rémy Girard, Allen Altman	Drama adapted from Wajdi Mouawad's play of the same name	Canada-France co-production; TIFF – Best Canadian Feature.
Jo for Jonathan (Jo pour Jonathan)	Maxime Giroux	Raphaël Lacaille, Jean-Sébastien Courchesne		
Journey's End (La Belle Visite)	Jean-François Caissy		Documentary	
The Kate Logan Affair	Noël Mitrani	Alexis Bledel, Laurent Lucas	Drama	
The Last Escape (La Derniere fugue)	Léa Pool	Yves Jacques, Jacques Godin	Drama	Canada-Luxemburg co-production
The Legacy (La Donation)	Bernard Émond	Elise Guilbault, Jacques Godin	Drama	
The Legend of Beaver Dam	Jerome Sable	L. J. Benet, Seán Cullen, Rick Miller	Short musical horror comedy	
A Life Begins	Michel Monty	Julie Le Breton	Drama	
Life with Murder	John Kastner	Brian Jenkins, Leslie Jenkins	Documentary	
Lipsett Diaries	Theodore Ushev	Arthur Lipsett	National Film Board Animated documentary	Genie Award – Animated Short; Prix Jutra – Animated Film; see also 2006 film Remembering Arthur
Little Flowers (Les Fleurs de l'âge)	Vincent Biron		Short drama	
Marius Borodine	Emanuel Hoss-Desmarais	Wilson Henley, Vincent Hoss-Desmarais	Short comedy drama	
Mighty Jerome	Charles Officer	Harry Jerome	National Film Board Documentary	
Modra	Ingrid Veninger	Hallie Switzer	Drama	Canada-Slovakia co-production
Mokhtar	Halima Ouardiri		Short drama	
A Montreal Girl (La Fille de Montréal)	Jeanne Crépeau	Amélie Grenier, Réal Bossé, Marie-Hélène Montpetit, Jean Turcotte	Drama	
Mourning for Anna (Trois temps après la mort d'Anna)	Catherine Martin	Guylaine Tremblay, Denis Bernard, Paule Baillargeon	Drama	
Oliver Sherman	Ryan Redford	Garret Dillahunt, Molly Parker, Donal Logue	Drama	
On the Way to the Sea	Tao Gu		Short documentary	
Peepers	Seth W. Owen	Joe Cobden, Janine Theriault, Paul Spence, Dan Beirne	Comedy	
Piché: The Landing of a Man (Piché, entre ciel et terre)	Sylvain Archambault	Michel Côté, Maxime Le Flaguais, Normand D'Amour, Sophie Prégent, Isabelle Guérard	Drama	
Powder (Poudre)	Ky Nam Le Duc		Short drama	
Repeaters	Carl Bessai	Dustin Milligan, Amanda Crew, Richard de Klerk, Gabrielle Rose	Drama	
Resident Evil: Afterlife	Paul W. S. Anderson	Milla Jovovich, Ali Larter, Kim Coates, Shawn Roberts, Wentworth Miller	Action, Horror in 3D.	Golden Reel Award. A Canada-France-German co-production made with U.S. financing; with a worldwide box office gross in excess of $296 million, this is the highest-grossing Canadian film.
Rhonda's Party	Ashley McKenzie	Marguerite McNeil, Karine Vanasse	Short drama	
Route 132	Louis Bélanger	François Papineau, Alexis Martin	Crime drama	
Score: A Hockey Musical	Michael McGowan	Noah Reid, Allie MacDonald, Olivia Newton-John, Stephen McHattie, Marc Jordan	Musical	
A Shine of Rainbows	Vic Sarin	Aidan Quinn, Connie Nielsen, John Bell-Thomas, Jack Gleason	Drama	Canada-Ireland co-production
Silence Lies (Tromper le silence)	Julie Hivon	Suzanne Clément, Maxime Dumontier, Sébastien Huberdeau	Drama	
Slow Torture Puke Chamber	Lucifer Valentine	Shari Caruso, Ameara Lavey, Hope Likens	Horror	
Small Town Murder Songs	Ed Gass-Donnelly	Peter Stormare, Martha Plimpton, Jill Hennessy	Crime drama	
Snow and Ashes	Charles-Olivier Michaud	Rhys Coiro	Drama	
Sounds Like a Revolution	Summer "Love" Preney, Jane Michener	Michael Franti, Fat Mike, Paris, Jello Biafra	Documentary	
Splice	Vincenzo Natali	Adrien Brody, Sarah Polley, Delphine Chanéac, David Hewlett	Science fiction, horror	Canada-France co-production made with U.S. financing
Stay with Me (Reste avec moi)	Robert Ménard	Gérard Poirier, Danielle Proulx, Vincent Bilodeau, Maxim Roy	Drama	
Suspicions (Jaloux)	Patrick Demers	Sophie Cadieux, Maxime Denommée, Benoît Gouin	Drama/Thriller	
This Movie Is Broken	Bruce McDonald	Greg Calderone, Georgina Reilly	Romantic comedy/concert film	Featuring the Broken Social Scene
The Trenches (La Tranchée)	Claude Cloutier		Animated short	
Trigger	Bruce McDonald	Molly Parker, Tracy Wright, Don McKellar, Sarah Polley	Comedy drama	
Turtles Do Not Die of Old Age (Les tortues ne meurent pas de vieillesse)	Hind Benchekroun, Sami Mermer		Documentary	
Twice a Woman (Deux fois une femme)	François Delisle	Évelyne Rompré	Drama	
Unrivaled	Warren P. Sonoda	Hector Echevarria	Action drama	
Vapor	Kaveh Nabatian	Marco Ledezma, Evergon	Short drama	
We're the Weakerthans, We're from Winnipeg	Caelum Vatnsdal	The Weakerthans	Documentary, concert film	
The Whistleblower	Larysa Kondracki	Rachel Weisz, Vanessa Redgrave, David Strathairn, Monica Bellucci, Roxana Condurache	Drama	Canada-German co-production made with U.S. financing
Wrecked	Michael J. Greenspan	Adrien Brody, Caroline Dhavernas	Drama	Made with U.S. financing
Year of the Carnivore	Sook-Yin Lee	Cristin Milioti, Mark Rendell, Kevin McDonald, Sheila McCarthy	Drama	
You Are Here	Daniel Cockburn	Tracy Wright, R. D. Reid, Nadia Litz	Drama	
You Don't Like the Truth: Four Days Inside Guantanamo	Luc Côté & Patricio Henríquez		Documentary	Made for TV; Gémeaux Award winner
Zooey and Adam	Sean Garrity	Tom Keenan, Daria Puttaert, Omar Khan	Drama	Shot with a digital camcorder by a one-man crew on a minuscule budget.

== See also ==
- 2010 in Canada
- 2010 in Canadian television
