= Prix Iris for Best Supporting Actor =

Annual Canadian film award

Québec Cinéma presents an annual award for Best Supporting Actor (French: Prix Iris de la meilleure interprétation masculin dans un rôle de soutien) to recognize the best in the Cinema of Quebec.

Until 2016, it was known as the Jutra Award for Best Supporting Actor in memory of influential Quebec film director Claude Jutra. Following the withdrawal of Jutra's name from the award, the 2016 award was presented under the name Québec Cinéma. The Prix Iris name was announced in October 2016.

Rémy Girard received the most nominations in this category, five, but didn't win any. Jean Lapointe and Luc Picard are the only actors to win this award twice. Two non-Canadian actors won the award: Serge Kanyinda for War Witch (Rebelle) and Sergio Castellitto for Mafia Inc., the former becoming the first black actor to win the award. At the 2024 ceremony, Steve Laplante became the first actor to receive two acting nominations in the same category.

Six actors received nominations for Best Actor and Best Supporting Actor in the same year:

- In 2002, Luc Picard won Best Actor for February 15, 1839 (15 février 1839) and was nominated for Best Supporting Actor for The Woman Who Drinks (La femme qui boit).
- In 2008, Guillaume Lemay-Thivierge was nominated for Best Actor for Nitro and Best Supporting Actor for The 3 L'il Pigs (Les 3 p'tits cochons).
- In 2012, Mario Saint-Amand was nominated for Best Actor for Gerry and Best Supporting Actor for Coteau rouge.
- In 2020, Robin Aubert was nominated for Best Actor for Young Juliette (Jeune Juliette) and Best Supporting Actor for Thanks for Everything (Merci pour tout).
- In 2023, Steve Laplante won Best Actor for Viking and was nominated for Best Supporting Actor for Babysitter.
- In 2024, Marc-André Grondin was nominated for Best Actor for The Successor (Le successeur) and won Best Supporting Actor for Richelieu.

== 1990s ==
Year	Actor	Film	Ref
1999; 1st Jutra Awards
1999; 1st Jutra Awards	Colm Feore	The Red Violin (Le violon rouge)	
1999; 1st Jutra Awards	Claude Blanchard	Now or Never (Aujourd'hui ou jamais)	
1999; 1st Jutra Awards	Denis Bouchard	It's Your Turn, Laura Cadieux (C't'à ton tour, Laura Cadieux)	
1999; 1st Jutra Awards	Rémy Girard	Les Boys II	

== 2000s ==
Year	Actor	Film	Ref
2000; 2nd Jutra Awards
2000; 2nd Jutra Awards	Julien Poulin	The Last Breath (Le dernier souffle)	
2000; 2nd Jutra Awards	Jean-Pierre Bergeron	The Big Snake of the World (Le grand serpent du monde)	
2000; 2nd Jutra Awards	Gary Boudreault	Matroni and Me (Matroni et moi)	
2000; 2nd Jutra Awards	Yves Jacques	Memories Unlocked (Souvenirs intimes)	
2001; 3rd Jutra Awards
2001; 3rd Jutra Awards	David Boutin	Hochelaga	
2001; 3rd Jutra Awards	Patrick Huard	Life After Love (La vie après l'amour)	
2001; 3rd Jutra Awards	Julien Poulin	Heaven (Le petit ciel)	
2001; 3rd Jutra Awards	Donald Sutherland	The Art of War	
2002; 4th Jutra Awards
2002; 4th Jutra Awards	Emmanuel Bilodeau	Soft Shell Man (Un crabe dans la tête)	
2002; 4th Jutra Awards	Rabah Aït Ouyahia	Tar Angel (L'ange de goudron)	
2002; 4th Jutra Awards	Pierre Lebeau	Les Boys III	
2002; 4th Jutra Awards	Luc Picard	The Woman Who Drinks (La femme qui boit)	
2003; 5th Jutra Awards
2003; 5th Jutra Awards	Luc Picard	The Collector (Le collectionneur)	
2003; 5th Jutra Awards	Rémy Girard	Séraphin: Heart of Stone (Séraphin: Un homme et son péché)	
2003; 5th Jutra Awards	Dominic Darceuil	Inside (Histoire de pen)	
2003; 5th Jutra Awards	Benoît Gouin	Québec-Montréal	
2004; 6th Jutra Awards
2004; 6th Jutra Awards	Pierre Collin	Seducing Doctor Lewis (La grande Séduction)	
2004; 6th Jutra Awards	Benoît Brière	Seducing Doctor Lewis (La grande Séduction)	
2004; 6th Jutra Awards	Pierre Curzi	The Barbarian Invasions (Les invasions barbares)	
2004; 6th Jutra Awards	Sébastien Delorme	Gaz Bar Blues	
2005; 7th Jutra Awards
2005; 7th Jutra Awards	Jean Lapointe	The Last Tunnel (Le dernier tunnel)	
2005; 7th Jutra Awards	Emmanuel Bilodeau	Love and Magnets (Les aimants)	
2005; 7th Jutra Awards	Stéphane Crête	Dans une galaxie près de chez vous	
2005; 7th Jutra Awards	Serge Postigo	Bittersweet Memories (Ma vie en cinémascope)	
2006; 8th Jutra Awards
2006; 8th Jutra Awards	Michel Côté	C.R.A.Z.Y.	
2006; 8th Jutra Awards	Denis Bernard	Audition (L'audition)	
2006; 8th Jutra Awards	Pierre-Luc Brillant	C.R.A.Z.Y.	
2006; 8th Jutra Awards	Alexis Martin	Audition (L'audition)	
2007; 9th Jutra Awards
2007; 9th Jutra Awards	Gabriel Arcand	Congorama	
2007; 9th Jutra Awards	Gabriel Gascon	The Little Book of Revenge (Guide de la petite vengeance)	
2007; 9th Jutra Awards	Pierre Lebeau	Bon Cop, Bad Cop	
2007; 9th Jutra Awards	Gilles Renaud	The Secret Life of Happy People (La vie secrète des gens heureux)	
2008; 10th Jutra Awards
2008; 10th Jutra Awards	Réal Bossé	Continental, a Film Without Guns (Continental, un film sans fusil)	
2008; 10th Jutra Awards	Emmanuel Bilodeau	Bluff	
2008; 10th Jutra Awards	Paul Doucet	The 3 L'il Pigs (Les 3 p'tits cochons)	
2008; 10th Jutra Awards	Guillaume Lemay-Thivierge	The 3 L'il Pigs (Les 3 p'tits cochons)	
2009; 11th Jutra Awards
2009; 11th Jutra Awards	Normand D'Amour	Everything Is Fine (Tout est parfait)	
2009; 11th Jutra Awards	Gabriel Arcand	Mommy Is at the Hairdresser's (Maman est chez le coiffeur)	
2009; 11th Jutra Awards	Daniel Brière	It's Not Me, I Swear! (C'est pas moi, je le jure !)	
2009; 11th Jutra Awards	Luc Picard	Babine	

== 2010s ==
Year	Actor	Film	Ref
2010; 12th Jutra Awards
2010; 12th Jutra Awards	Maxim Gaudette	Polytechnique	
2010; 12th Jutra Awards	Normand Daneau	Suzie	
2010; 12th Jutra Awards	Rémy Girard	Father and Guns (De père en flic)	
2010; 12th Jutra Awards	Stephen McHattie	The Timekeeper	
2010; 12th Jutra Awards	Dimitri Storoge	Through the Mist (Dédé, à travers les brumes)	
2011; 13th Jutra Awards
2011; 13th Jutra Awards	Jean Lapointe	Crying Out (À l'origine d'un cri)	
2011; 13th Jutra Awards	Martin Dubreuil	7 Days (Les sept jours du talion)	
2011; 13th Jutra Awards	Yves Jacques	The Last Escape (La dernière fugue)	
2011; 13th Jutra Awards	Alexis Martin	Route 132	
2011; 13th Jutra Awards	Gérard Poirier	Stay with Me (Reste avec moi)	
2012; 14th Jutra Awards
2012; 14th Jutra Awards	Émilien Néron	Monsieur Lazhar	
2012; 14th Jutra Awards	Antoine Bertrand	Thrill of the Hills (Frisson des collines)	
2012; 14th Jutra Awards	Nicolas Canuel	La Run	
2012; 14th Jutra Awards	François Papineau	A Life Begins (Une vie qui commence)	
2012; 14th Jutra Awards	Mario Saint-Amand	Coteau rouge	
2013; 15th Jutra Awards
2013; 15th Jutra Awards	Serge Kanyinda	War Witch (Rebelle)	
2013; 15th Jutra Awards	Joey Klein	The Girl in the White Coat	
2013; 15th Jutra Awards	Guy Nadon	The Pee-Wee 3D: The Winter That Changed My Life (Les Pee-Wee 3D: L'hiver qui a changé ma vie)	
2013; 15th Jutra Awards	Sébastien Ricard	Before My Heart Falls (Avant que mon cœur bascule)	
2013; 15th Jutra Awards	Gildor Roy	Ésimésac	
2014; 16th Jutra Awards
2014; 16th Jutra Awards	Guillaume Cyr	Louis Cyr (Louis Cyr: L'homme le plus fort du monde)	
2014; 16th Jutra Awards	Normand Daoust	Fair Sex (Les manèges humains)	
2014; 16th Jutra Awards	Benoît Gouin	Gabrielle	
2014; 16th Jutra Awards	Vincent-Guillaume Otis	Gabrielle	
2014; 16th Jutra Awards	Gilles Renaud	The Dismantling (Le démantèlement)	
2015; 17th Jutra Awards
2015; 17th Jutra Awards	Pierre-Yves Cardinal	Tom at the Farm (Tom à la ferme)	
2015; 17th Jutra Awards	Robin Aubert	Miraculum	
2015; 17th Jutra Awards	Patrick Hivon	Guardian Angel (L'ange gardien)	
2015; 17th Jutra Awards	Francis La Haye	You're Sleeping Nicole (Tu dors Nicole)	
2015; 17th Jutra Awards	Stephen McHattie	Meetings with a Young Poet	
2016; 18th Quebec Cinema Awards
2016; 18th Quebec Cinema Awards	Irdens Exantus	My Internship in Canada (Guibord s'en va-t-en guerre)	
2016; 18th Quebec Cinema Awards	Salim Kechiouche	Noir	
2016; 18th Quebec Cinema Awards	Jean-Simon Leduc	Love in the Time of Civil War (L'amour au temps de la guerre civile)	
2016; 18th Quebec Cinema Awards	Tony Nardi	Corbo	
2016; 18th Quebec Cinema Awards	Luzer Twersky	Felix and Meira (Félix et Meira)	
2017; 19th Quebec Cinema Awards
2017; 19th Quebec Cinema Awards	Luc Picard	Bad Seeds (Les mauvaises herbes)	
2017; 19th Quebec Cinema Awards	Guillaume Cyr	The New Life of Paul Sneijder (La nouvelle vie de Paul Sneijder)	
2017; 19th Quebec Cinema Awards	Martin Dubreuil	Shambles (Maudite poutine)	
2017; 19th Quebec Cinema Awards	Tony Nardi	Kiss Me Like a Lover (Embrasse-moi comme tu m'aimes)	
2017; 19th Quebec Cinema Awards	Simon Pigeon	Prank	
2018; 20th Quebec Cinema Awards
2018; 20th Quebec Cinema Awards	Emmanuel Schwartz	Hochelaga, Land of Souls (Hochelaga, terre des âmes)	
2018; 20th Quebec Cinema Awards	Jahmil French	Boost	
2018; 20th Quebec Cinema Awards	Robert Morin	Tuktuq	
2018; 20th Quebec Cinema Awards	Guy Thauvette	Infiltration (Le problème d'infiltration)	
2018; 20th Quebec Cinema Awards	Anthony Therrien	Slut in a Good Way (Charlotte a du fun)	
2019; 21st Quebec Cinema Awards
2019; 21st Quebec Cinema Awards	Robin Aubert	A Colony (Une colonie)	
2019; 21st Quebec Cinema Awards	Pier-Luc Funk	Genesis (Genèse)	
2019; 21st Quebec Cinema Awards	Vincent Leclerc	The Fall of the American Empire (La chute de l'empire américain)	
2019; 21st Quebec Cinema Awards	Alexandre Nachi	1991	
2019; 21st Quebec Cinema Awards	Henri Picard	For Those Who Don't Read Me (À tous ceux qui ne me lisent pas)	

== 2020s ==
Year	Actor	Film	Ref
2020; 22nd Quebec Cinema Awards
2020; 22nd Quebec Cinema Awards	Sergio Castellitto	Mafia Inc.	
2020; 22nd Quebec Cinema Awards	Robin Aubert	Thanks for Everything (Merci pour tout)	
2020; 22nd Quebec Cinema Awards	Pier-Luc Funk	Matthias & Maxime	
2020; 22nd Quebec Cinema Awards	Sasson Gabai	A Brother's Love (La femme de mon frère)	
2020; 22nd Quebec Cinema Awards	Rémy Girard	And the Birds Rained Down (Il pleuvait des oiseaux)	
2021; 23rd Quebec Cinema Awards
2021; 23rd Quebec Cinema Awards	Théodore Pellerin	Underground (Souterrain)	
2021; 23rd Quebec Cinema Awards	Normand D'Amour	Goddess of the Fireflies (La déesse des mouches à feu)	
2021; 23rd Quebec Cinema Awards	Rémy Girard	The Vinland Club (Le club Vinland)	
2021; 23rd Quebec Cinema Awards	James Hyndman	Underground (Souterrain)	
2021; 23rd Quebec Cinema Awards	Robin L'Houmeau	Goddess of the Fireflies (La déesse des mouches à feu)	
2022; 24th Quebec Cinema Awards
2022; 24th Quebec Cinema Awards	Claude Legault	Drunken Birds (Les oiseaux ivres)	
2022; 24th Quebec Cinema Awards	Guillaume Cyr	The Time Thief (L’arracheuse de temps)	
2022; 24th Quebec Cinema Awards	Martin Dubreuil	Maria Chapdelaine	
2022; 24th Quebec Cinema Awards	Rabah Aït Ouyahia	A Revision (Une révision)	
2022; 24th Quebec Cinema Awards	Émile Schneider	Maria Chapdelaine	
2023; 25th Quebec Cinema Awards
2023; 25th Quebec Cinema Awards	Charles-Aubey Houde	The Dishwasher (Le plongeur)	
2023; 25th Quebec Cinema Awards	Maxime de Cotret	The Dishwasher (Le plongeur)	
2023; 25th Quebec Cinema Awards	Denis Houle	Viking	
2023; 25th Quebec Cinema Awards	Steve Laplante	Babysitter	
2023; 25th Quebec Cinema Awards	Guy Nadon	One Summer (Le temps d'un été)	
2024; 26th Quebec Cinema Awards
2024; 26th Quebec Cinema Awards	Marc-André Grondin	Richelieu	
2024; 26th Quebec Cinema Awards	Martin Dubreuil	Kanaval	
2024; 26th Quebec Cinema Awards	Steve Laplante	Humanist Vampire Seeking Consenting Suicidal Person (Vampire humaniste cherche suicidaire consentant)	
2024; 26th Quebec Cinema Awards	Steve Laplante	The Nature of Love (Simple comme Sylvain)	
2024; 26th Quebec Cinema Awards	Francis-William Rhéaume	The Nature of Love (Simple comme Sylvain)	
2025; 27th Quebec Cinema Awards
2025; 27th Quebec Cinema Awards	Mani Soleymanlou	Universal Language (Une langue universelle)	
2025; 27th Quebec Cinema Awards	Alexis Martin	Vile & Miserable (Vil & Misérable)	
2025; 27th Quebec Cinema Awards	Vincent-Guillaume Otis	Blue Sky Jo (La petite et le vieux)	
2025; 27th Quebec Cinema Awards	François Papineau	You Are Not Alone (Vous n'êtes pas seuls)	
2025; 27th Quebec Cinema Awards	Gilles Renaud	Peak Everything (Amour apocalypse)	

== Multiple wins and nominations ==
=== Multiple wins ===
Wins	Actor
2	Jean Lapointe
2	Luc Picard

=== Three or more nominations ===
Nominations	Actor
5	Rémy Girard
4	Martin Dubreuil
4	Luc Picard
3	Robin Aubert
3	Emmanuel Bilodeau
3	Guillaume Cyr
3	Alexis Martin
3	Gilles Renaud

== Combined totals for Best Actor, Best Supporting Actor and Revelation of the Year ==
=== Multiple wins ===
Wins	Actor
3	Gabriel Arcand
3	Théodore Pellerin
3	Luc Picard
3	Gilbert Sicotte
2	Paul Ahmarani
2	Roy Dupuis
2	Marc-André Grondin
2	Jean Lapointe
2	Claude Legault
2	Julien Poulin
2	Sébastien Ricard

=== Three or more nominations ===
Nominations	Actor
10	Luc Picard
7	Rémy Girard
6	Gabriel Arcand
6	Patrick Hivon
5	Michel Côté
5	Martin Dubreuil
5	Marc-André Grondin
5	Patrick Huard
5	Alexis Martin
4	Paul Ahmarani
4	Robin Aubert
4	Emmanuel Bilodeau
4	Jean-Carl Boucher
4	Guillaume Cyr
4	Roy Dupuis
4	Steve Laplante
4	Pierre Lebeau
4	Vincent-Guillaume Otis
4	François Papineau
4	Théodore Pellerin
3	Antoine Bertrand
3	Normand D'Amour
3	David La Haye
3	Claude Legault
3	Antoine Olivier Pilon
3	Julien Poulin
3	Gilles Renaud
3	Sébastien Ricard
3	Patrice Robitaille
3	Gilbert Sicotte

== See also ==
- Canadian Screen Award for Best Supporting Actor
