= 13th Jutra Awards =

2011 Canadian film awards ceremony

The 13th Jutra Awards were held on March 13, 2011 to honour films made with the participation of the Quebec film industry in 2010. Nominations were announced on February 9.

The ceremony was dominated by Denis Villeneuve's Incendies which received eleven nominations in ten categories. It swept the awards by winning nine trophies, including Best Film, Best Director, Best Screenplay and Best Actress for Lubna Azabal. The only award it lost was Most Successful Film Outside Quebec, which was won by Xavier Dolan's Heartbeats (Les amours imaginaires).

Barney's Version was the only other film to take home multiple awards, winning Best Makeup and Best Hair.

Daniel Grou directed two films that received multiple nominations: 7 Days (Les sept jours du talion) was nominated for six awards, including Best Supporting Actor for Martin Dubreuil, while 10½ received four nominations including Best Film, Best Director and Best Actor for Claude Legault who eventually won the award.

Actor Jean Lapointe received the Tribute Award for his lifetime achievements. He also won the award for Best Supporting Actor for Crying Out (À l'origine d'un cri), his second win in this category after The Last Tunnel (Le dernier tunnel).

== Winners and nominees ==
Best Film	Best Director
Incendies — Luc Déry, Kim McCraw; 10½ — Pierre Gendron; Curling — Stéphanie Morissette, Denis Côté; Heartbeats (Les amours imaginaires) — Xavier Dolan, Daniel Morin, Carole Mondello; Vital Signs (Les signes vitaux) — Nicolas Fonseca	Denis Villeneuve, Incendies; Denis Côté, Curling; Xavier Dolan, Heartbeats (Les amours imaginaires); Daniel Grou, 10½; Kim Nguyen, City of Shadows (La cité)
Best Actor	Best Actress
Claude Legault, 10½; Jay Baruchel, The Trotsky; Emmanuel Bilodeau, Curling; Jacques Godin, The Last Escape (La dernière fugue); François Papineau, Route 132	Lubna Azabal, Incendies; Suzanne Clément, Silence Lies (Tromper le silence); Mélissa Désormeaux-Poulin, Incendies; Évelyne Rompré, Twice a Woman (Deux fois une femme); Guylaine Tremblay, Mourning for Anna (Trois temps après la mort d'Anna)
Best Supporting Actor	Best Supporting Actress
Jean Lapointe, Crying Out (À l'origine d'un cri); Martin Dubreuil, 7 Days (Les sept jours du talion); Yves Jacques, The Last Escape (La dernière fugue); Alexis Martin, Route 132; Gérard Poirier, Stay with Me (Reste avec moi)	Dorothée Berryman, The Comeback (Cabotins); Marie Brassard, Vital Signs (Les signes vitaux); Geneviève Chartrand, Aurelie Laflamme's Diary (Le journal d'Aurélie Laflamme); Isabelle Miquelon, The Last Escape (La dernière fugue); Danielle Proulx, Stay with Me (Reste avec moi)
Best Screenplay	Best Documentary
Denis Villeneuve and Valérie Beaugrand-Champagne, Incendies; Robin Aubert, Crying Out (À l'origine d'un cri); Michael Konyves, Barney's Version; Claude Lalonde, 10½; Ian Lauzon, Piché: The Landing of a Man (Piché, entre ciel et terre)	Falardeau — Carmen Garcia, German Gutierrez; Heart of Auschwitz (Le cœur d'Auschwitz) — Carl Leblanc; Hope Builders (Les porteurs d'espoir) — Fernand Dansereau; Journey's End (La belle visite) — Jean-François Caissy; You Don't Like the Truth: Four Days Inside Guantanamo — Luc Côté, Patricio Henríquez
Best Live Short	Best Animated Short
Opening Up (M'ouvrir) — Albéric Aurtenèche; Félix et Malou — Sophie Dupuis; Mokhtar — Halima Ouardiri; Sophie Lavoie — Anne Émond; Vapor — Kaveh Nabatian	Lipsett Diaries — Theodore Ushev; Higglety Pigglety Pop! or There Must Be More to Life — Chris Lavis, Maciek Szczerbowski; The Festival (La fête) — Malcolm Sutherland; Mamori — Karl Lemieux; Un vortex dans face — Joël Vaudreuil
Best Art Direction	Best Cinematography
André-Line Beauparlant, Incendies; Dominique Desrochers, The Comeback (Cabotins); Claude Paré, Barney's Version; Michel Proulx, The Child Prodigy (L'enfant prodige); Patrice Vermette, City of Shadows (La cité)	André Turpin, Incendies; Nicolas Bolduc, City of Shadows (La cité); Bernard Couture, 7 Days (Les sept jours du talion); Michel La Veaux, Mourning for Anna (Trois temps après la mort d'Anna); Claudine Sauvé, Silence Lies (Tromper le silence)
Best Costume Design	Best Editing
Sophie Lefebvre, Incendies; Carmen Alie, The Comeback (Cabotins); Mariane Carter, City of Shadows (La cité); Francesca Chamberland, The Child Prodigy (L'enfant prodige); Julie-Anne Tremblay, Aurelie Laflamme's Diary (Le journal d'Aurélie Laflamme)	Monique Dartonne, Incendies; Michel Arcand, The Last Escape (La dernière fugue); Carina Baccanale, Crying Out (À l'origine d'un cri); Xavier Dolan, Heartbeats (Les amours imaginaires); Valérie Héroux, 7 Days (Les sept jours du talion)
Best Hair	Best Makeup
Réjean Goderre, Barney's Version; André Duval, The Hair of the Beast (Le poil de la bête); Réjean Goderre, Oscar and the Lady in Pink (Oscar et la dame rose); Sabin Paradis, The Comeback (Cabotins); Philippe Sarfati, Heartbeats (Les amours imaginaires)	Adrien Morot, Barney's Version; Marlène Rouleau and C. J. Goldman, 7 Days (Les sept jours du talion); Joan-Patricia Parris, Vital Signs (Les signes vitaux); Micheline Trépanier, Oscar and the Lady in Pink (Oscar et la dame rose); Mélanie Turcotte and Mario Soucy, Twice a Woman (Deux fois une femme)
Best Original Music	Best Sound
Guy Bélanger and Benoît Charest, Route 132; Michel Cusson, Stay with Me (Reste avec moi); Julien Knafo, Blind Spot (Lucidité passagère); Philippe Héritier, City of Shadows (La cité); Martin Léon, Aurelie Laflamme's Diary (Le journal d'Aurélie Laflamme)	Sylvain Bellemare, Jean Umansky and Jean-Pierre Laforce, Incendies; Martin Desmarais, Dominique Delguste and Luc Mandeville, The Comeback (Cabotins); Marie-Claude Gagné, Louis Gignac and Patrick Rousseau, Oscar and the Lady in Pink (Oscar et la dame rose); Michel Lecoufle, Pierre-Jules Audet and Luc Boudrias, 7 Days (Les sept jours du talion); Simon Poudrette, Christian Rivest, Isabelle Lussier and Stéphane Bergeron, File 13 (Filière 13)
Most Successful Film Outside Quebec	Special Awards
Heartbeats (Les amours imaginaires) — Xavier Dolan; 7 Days (Les sept jours du talion) — Daniel Grou; Curling — Denis Côté; Incendies — Denis Villeneuve; The Trotsky — Jacob Tierney	Jutra Hommage: Jean Lapointe; Billet d'or: Piché: The Landing of a Man (Piché, entre ciel et terre)

== Multiple wins and nominations ==
=== Films with multiple nominations ===
Nominations	Film
11	Incendies
6	7 Days (Les sept jours du talion)
5	City of Shadows (La cité)
5	The Comeback (Cabotins)
5	Heartbeats (Les amours imaginaires)
4	10½
4	Barney's Version
4	Curling
4	The Last Escape (La dernière fugue)
3	Aurelie Laflamme's Diary (Le journal d'Aurélie Laflamme)
3	Crying Out (À l'origine d'un cri)
3	Oscar and the Lady in Pink (Oscar et la dame rose)
3	Route 132
3	Stay with Me (Reste avec moi)
3	Vital Signs (Les signes vitaux)
2	The Child Prodigy (L'enfant prodige)
2	Mourning for Anna (Trois temps après la mort d'Anna)
2	Silence Lies (Tromper le silence)
2	The Trotsky
2	Twice a Woman (Deux fois une femme)

=== Films with multiple wins ===
Wins	Film
9	Incendies
2	Barney's Version
