= Prix Iris Tribute Award =

Lifetime Achievement Award by Québec Cinéma

The Iris Tribute Award (French: Prix Iris Hommage) is an annual award presented by Québec Cinéma, as part of its Prix Iris program, as a lifetime achievement award for distinguished accomplishments in the Cinema of Quebec.

Until 2016, it was known as the Jutra Hommage, presented as part of the Jutra Awards. It was renamed from Jutra to Iris, alongside the entire Prix Iris program, when Québec Cinéma stripped the name of film director Claude Jutra from its awards program in 2016. The Prix Iris name was announced in October 2016.

== Recipients ==
Year	Recipient	Ref
1999 (1st Jutra Awards)	Marcel Sabourin	
2000 (2nd Jutra Awards)	Frédéric Back	
2001 (3rd Jutra Awards)	Gilles Carle	
2002 (4th Jutra Awards)	Anne Claire Poirier	
2003 (5th Jutra Awards)	Rock Demers	
2004 (6th Jutra Awards)	Richard Grégoire	
2005 (7th Jutra Awards)	Michel Brault	
2006 (8th Jutra Awards)	Denise Filiatrault	
2007 (9th Jutra Awards)	Pierre Curzi	
2008 (10th Jutra Awards)	Jean-Claude Labrecque	
2009 (11th Jutra Awards)	Fernand Dansereau	
2010 (12th Jutra Awards)	René Malo	
2011 (13th Jutra Awards)	Jean Lapointe	
2012 (14th Jutra Awards)	Paule Baillargeon	
2013 (15th Jutra Awards)	Michel Côté	
2014 (16th Jutra Awards)	Micheline Lanctôt	
2015 (17th Jutra Awards)	André Melançon	
2016 (18th Quebec Cinema Awards)	François Dompierre	
2017 (19th Quebec Cinema Awards)	Lyse Lafontaine	
2018 (20th Quebec Cinema Awards)	André Forcier	
2019 (21st Quebec Cinema Awards)	Pierre Mignot	
2020 (22nd Quebec Cinema Awards)	Alanis Obomsawin	
2021 (23rd Quebec Cinema Awards)	Association coopérative de productions audio-visuelles (ACPAV)	
2022 (24th Quebec Cinema Awards)	Louise Portal	
2023 (25th Quebec Cinema Awards)	Rémy Girard	
2024 (26th Quebec Cinema Awards)	Denis Villeneuve	
2025 (27th Quebec Cinema Awards)	Léa Pool	
