= The Last Escape =

The Last Escape may refer to:

- The Last Escape (1963 film), working title of the American World War II film The Great Escape
- The Last Escape (1970 film), an American-German World War II feature
- The Last Escape (2010 film), a French-language Canadian family drama
