= Jack and Jacques =

2006 Canadian short film

- French: Jack et Jacques
- Directed by: Marie-Hélène Copti
- Written by: Marie-Hélène Copti
- Produced by: Marie-Hélène Copti
- Starring: Pierre Lebeau; François Bernier; Guillermina Kerwin
- Cinematography: Michel La Veaux
- Edited by: Sylvain Lebel
- Music by: Steve Faulkner
- Production company: Coptik Films
- Distributed by: Christal Films
- Release date: August 26, 2006 (FFM)
- Running time: 14 minutes
- Country: Canada
- Language: French

Jack and Jacques (French: Jack et Jacques) is a Canadian short drama film, directed by Marie-Hélène Copti and released in 2006. The film stars Pierre Lebeau as Jacques Jobin, a mediocre actor from Quebec who has been cast in a small part as a Native American in a Western film starring Jack Nicholson, and is being interviewed by student filmmakers Pat Beauséjour (François Bernier) and Annie St-Gelais (Guillermina Kerwin) about his experiences on set and his hopes that the role will provide the career breakthrough that's always eluded him.

The film premiered at the 2006 Montreal World Film Festival, where it won the award for Most Popular Canadian Short Film. It received a Genie Award nomination for Best Live Action Short Drama at the 27th Genie Awards in 2007.

In 2011, Copti and Lebeau collaborated on the nine-episode web series Jack Jobin TV, which revisted the character pontificating on other topics.
