= Twice a Woman =

Twice a Woman may refer to:

- Twice a Woman (1979 film), also known as Il sogno di Laura and Twee Vrouwen, a 1979 Dutch film directed by George Sluizer,
- Twice a Woman (2010 film), also known as Deux fois une femme, a 2010 Canadian film directed by François Delisle.
