= Camille Felton =

Canadian actress (born 1999)

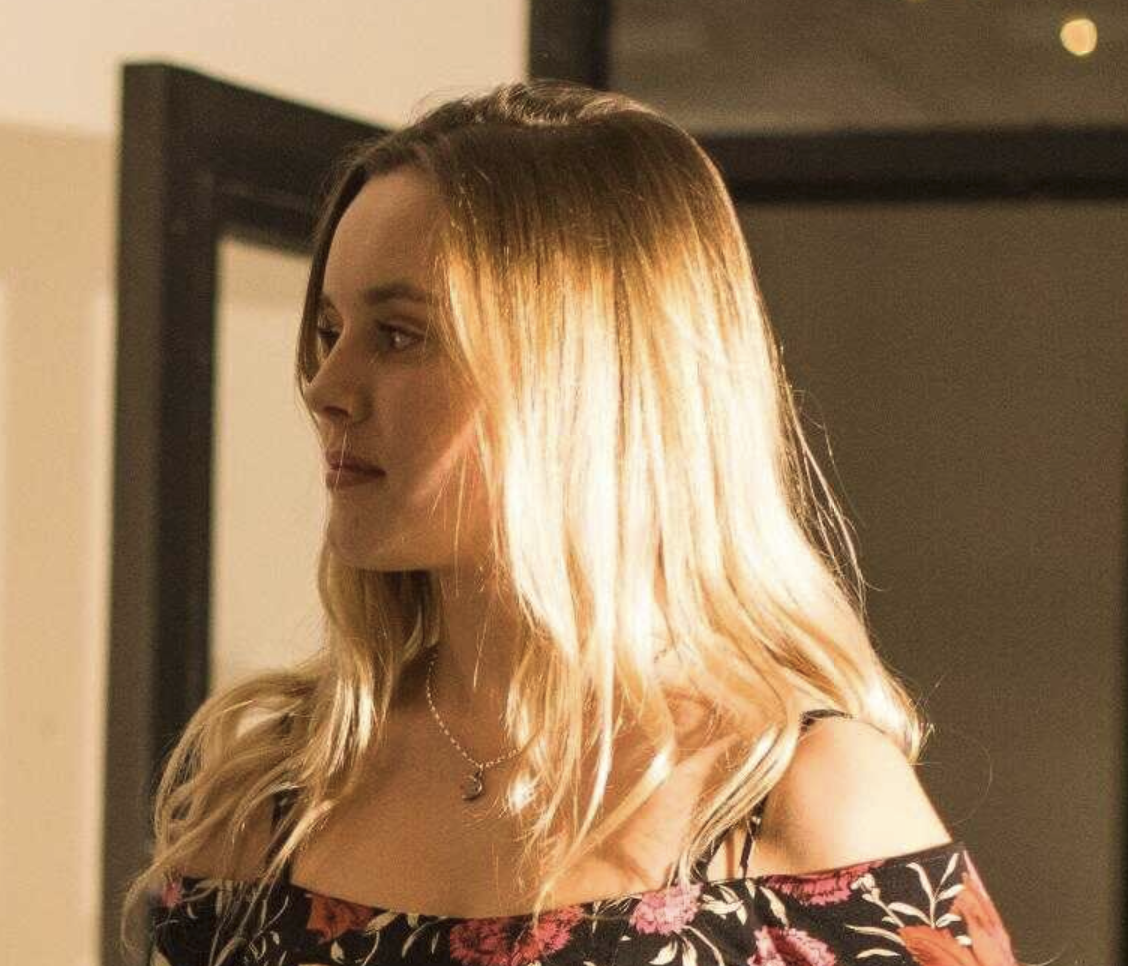
- Born: October 21, 1999 (age 26)
- Other names: la canisse
- Occupation: Actress
- Known for: la blonde à vilz
- Notable work: Noémie in Noémie: Le Secret

Camille Felton (born October 21, 1999, in Laval, Quebec) is a Canadian actress. She is known for her role as Noémie in Noémie: Le Secret, with Rita Lafontaine and Nicolas Laliberté, and for her role in Aurelie Laflamme's Diary (Le Journal d'Aurélie Laflamme). In 2010, for her role as Noémie, Felton won the DIAMOND Award for Best Young Actress at the SCHLINGEL International Film Festival in Chemnitz, Germany.

== Biography ==
Camille Felton was born 21 October 1999 in Canada. Young, as an actress, made her beginnings on big screen where she had the role of Noémie in the movie Noémie: Le Secret beside Rita Lafontaine and Nicolas Laliberté.

In the following years, she appeared in Les chroniques d'une mère indigne, Le Journal d'Aurélie Laflamme, La Dernière Fugue, Les Invincibles, Bienvenue aux dames, Toute la vérité, 30 vies and in the web project Juliette en Direct, which has been rewarded with a Gémeaux award, a Numix award and of the grand excellence price of l'Alliance Médias Jeunesse 2012.

In autumn 2012, Camille embodied the character Émilie in Trauma and is part of the Un sur deux distribution, a dramatic comedy of TVA (Canada), where she is the character Léa. She is also a member of the Fan Club show team as a columnist for the sandwich challenges. She participates in the youth series Subito texto since January 6, 2014, where she plays Jennifer Blais.

In 2021 she was a competitor in the Quebec edition of Big Brother Célébrités.

== Filmography ==
- 2008 : The Last Escape (La Dernière Fugue)
- 2008 : Les Invincibles : young Lyne
- 2009 - 2010 : Bienvenue aux dames : Sabrina
- 2009 : Chronique d'une mère indigne
- 2009 : Les Gags juste pour rire : silent role
- 2009 : Aurelie Laflamme's Diary (Le Journal d'Aurélie Laflamme) : Aurélie (9 years old)
- 2009 : Les Hauts et les Bas de Sophie Paquin : Séréna
- 2010 : Noémie : Le Secret : Noémie
- 2010 : Toute la vérité : Noémie
- 2010 - 2012 : Juliette en direct : Juliette
- 2011 : Fan Club : sandwich columnist
- 2012 : 30 vies : Zoé Poulin
- 2012 - 2015 : Un sur 2 : Léa Belmont-Gascon
- 2012 : Trauma : Émilie Roche
- 2013 : Subito texto : Jennifer Blais
- 2019: Matthias & Maxime: Ericka
- 2021 : Big Brother Célébrités : Herself (Contestant)
- 2021 : Portrait-Robot | Adèle
- 2023 - Billie Blue (Cœur de slush): Annette

== Advertisements ==
- 2007 :Belle band
- 2007 : Education minister
- 2007 : IGA
- 2007 : McCain (Smoothies)
- 2008 : Canadian Tire (voix)
- 2009 : Forget group
- 2010 : Bécel
