= Soft Shell Man =

2001 film by André Turpin

- French: Un crabe dans la tête
- Directed by: André Turpin
- Screenplay by: André Turpin
- Produced by: Luc Déry; Nicole Hilaréguy; Joseph Hillel
- Starring: David La Haye; Isabelle Blais; Emmanuel Bilodeau
- Cinematography: André Turpin
- Edited by: Sophie Leblond
- Music by: Ramachandra Borcar; Guy Pelletier
- Production company: Qu4tre par Quatre
- Distributed by: Film Tonic
- Release date: September 7, 2001 (TIFF)
- Running time: 102 minutes
- Country: Canada
- Language: French

Soft Shell Man (French: Un crabe dans la tête) is a Québécois film, directed by André Turpin released in 2001.

The film was shot September to October 2000 in Aylmer, Quebec and Montreal. The film was selected as the Canadian entry for the Best Foreign Language Film at the 75th Academy Awards, but was not accepted as a nominee.

== Synopsis ==
Alex, a young photographer, continually seduces. He pleases everyone, without ever having any of his own ideas, passions, or conflicts. His existence is completely empty, dependent on the need to please others. While in Montreal, he has an adventure with a journalist, Marie, who is in the company of his best friend. This friend, Sara, is deaf.

== Cast ==
- David La Haye : Alex
- Isabelle Blais : Marie
- Emmanuel Bilodeau : Samuel
- Chantal Giroux : Sara
- Pascale Desrochers : Audrey
- Vincent Bilodeau : Directeur de galerie
- Charles Turpin : Armando
- Thai-Hoa Le : Jules
- Sophie Prégent : Simone

== Reception ==
=== Critical response ===
Soft Shell Man has an approval rating of 100% on review aggregator website Rotten Tomatoes, based on 7 reviews, and an average rating of 7/10.

=== Accolades ===
Soft Shell Man was Canada's submission for the Academy Award for Best Foreign Language Film, but was not nominated.

Award	Date of ceremony	Category	Recipient(s)	Result	Ref(s)
Genie Awards	February 7, 2002	Best Motion Picture	Joseph Hillel and Luc Déry	Nominated	
Genie Awards	February 7, 2002	Best Screenplay	André Turpin	Nominated	
Genie Awards	February 7, 2002	Best Actor	David La Haye	Nominated	
Genie Awards	February 7, 2002	Best Cinematography	André Turpin	Nominated	
Jutra Awards	February 17, 2002	Best Film	Luc Déry and Joseph Hillel	Won	
Jutra Awards	February 17, 2002	Best Director	André Turpin	Won	
Jutra Awards	February 17, 2002	Best Screenplay	André Turpin	Won	
Jutra Awards	February 17, 2002	Best Actor	David La Haye	Nominated	
Jutra Awards	February 17, 2002	Best Supporting Actor	Emmanuel Bilodeau	Won	
Jutra Awards	February 17, 2002	Best Supporting Actress	Pascale Desrochers	Nominated	
Jutra Awards	February 17, 2002	Best Cinematography	André Turpin	Won	
Jutra Awards	February 17, 2002	Best Editing	Sophie Leblond	Won	
Jutra Awards	February 17, 2002	Best Sound	Gilles Corbeil, Sylvain Bellemare and Louis Gignac	Nominated	
Jutra Awards	February 17, 2002	Best Original Music	Guy Pelletier and Ramachandra Borcar	Won	
Toronto Film Critics Association	December 18, 2002	Best Canadian Film		Runner-up	

== See also ==
- List of submissions to the 75th Academy Awards for Best Foreign Language Film
- List of Canadian submissions for the Academy Award for Best Foreign Language Film
