= Andrée Lachapelle =

French Canadian actress (1931–2019)

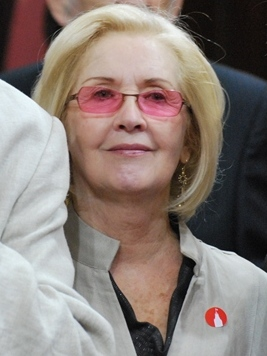
- Andrée Lachapelle in 2013
- Born: November 13, 1931; Montreal, Quebec, Canada
- Died: November 21, 2019 (aged 88)
- Years active: 1963–2019
- Spouse: André Melançon

Andrée Lachapelle, OC CQ (November 13, 1931 – November 21, 2019) was a French Canadian actress. Born in Montreal, she trained at age 14 at the Studio XV theatre school under Gerard Vleminckx, later attended teacher's college and taught elementary school for a few years. In 1952 she met actor Robert Gadouas, performed with him, and had three children before his death in 1969. She later appeared in plays by Michel Tremblay, Samuel Beckett and Tennessee Williams and in the films Rope Around the Neck (La corde au cou), YUL 871, Laura Laur, Léolo, Cap Tourmente, Route 132, The Last Escape and Don't Let the Angels Fall.

In 1985, Andrée Lachapelle was made an Officer of the Order of Canada. In 1990, she won the Prix Guy-L'Écuyer for ...comme un voleur. In 1997, she was made a Knight of the National Order of Quebec.

On November 21, 2019, Lachapelle died via assisted suicide at the age of 88 following a battle with cancer. She posthumously won the Prix Iris for Best Actress at the 22nd Quebec Cinema Awards, for her final performance in the film And the Birds Rained Down (Il pleuvait des oiseaux).

== Bibliography ==
- Marcel Dubé, Andrée Lachapelle : entre ciel et terre, collection Portraits d'artistes, Mnémosyne, Montréal, 1995, 117 p., ISBN 978-2-9217-8600-3 (in French)
