= Carina Baccanale =

Canadian film editor

Carina Baccanale is a Canadian film editor.

She has been a two-time Genie and Canadian Screen Award nominee for Canadian Screen Award for Best Editing, receiving nods at the 29th Genie Awards in 2009 for Le Banquet and at the 2nd Canadian Screen Awards in 2014 for Amsterdam, and a two-time Jutra Award nominee for Best Editing, with nods at the 11th Jutra Awards in 2009 for Le Banquet and at the 13th Jutra Awards in 2011 for Crying Out (À l'origine d'un cri).
