= Crying Out (film) =

- Film poster
- French: À l'origine d'un cri
- Directed by: Robin Aubert
- Written by: Robin Aubert
- Produced by: Roger Frappier; Luc Vandal
- Starring: Michel Barrette; Patrick Hivon; Jean Lapointe
- Cinematography: Steve Asselin
- Edited by: Carina Baccanale
- Production company: Max Films Productions
- Release date: September 10, 2010 (TIFF)
- Running time: 115 minutes
- Country: Canada
- Language: French

Crying Out (French: À l'origine d'un cri) is a Canadian drama film, directed by Robin Aubert and released in 2010. The film centres on a grief-stricken widower (Michel Barrette) who unexpectedly digs up his dead wife's corpse and runs off with it, forcing his father (Jean Lapointe) and son (Patrick Hivon) to set off in an attempt to find him before he gets arrested or commits suicide.

The film's cast also includes Alexis Martin, Johanne-Marie Tremblay, Charlotte Laurier, Micheline Bernard and Bénédicte Décary.

The film was shot in the spring and summer of 2009, in Vaudreuil and the Côte-Nord region of Quebec.

The film premiered on September 10, 2010, at the 2010 Toronto International Film Festival, before going into commercial release on September 24.

== Critical response ==
Brendan Kelly of the Montreal Gazette wrote that "Aubert delivers some striking images along the way, including many of the province's seedier roadside motels. But a lot of this doesn't work, most notably the device of continually showing a gang of ghostlike figures that appear to be following Barrette's character around. There's more dysfunction here than you can shake a stick at, but for those of us who've seen more than our fair share of angst-ridden Canadian flicks, there's a sense of deja-vu all over again to this. The best thing here is the three actors. Barrette, best-known for light comic roles, is totally convincing as this heartbroken man, and Hivon is also good as a guy bent on self-destruction. But the standout is Lapointe, who is just wonderful as the grizzled old codger who has no patience with his neurotic son and grandson."

== Awards ==
Lapointe won the Jutra Award for Best Supporting Actor at the 13th Jutra Awards, and the film was nominated for Best Screenplay (Aubert) and Best Editing (Carina Baccanale). Although Aubert did not receive a nomination for Best Director, winner Denis Villeneuve asserted in his acceptance speech that Aubert should have been the winner.
