= Martin Léon =

Canadian musician (born 1966)

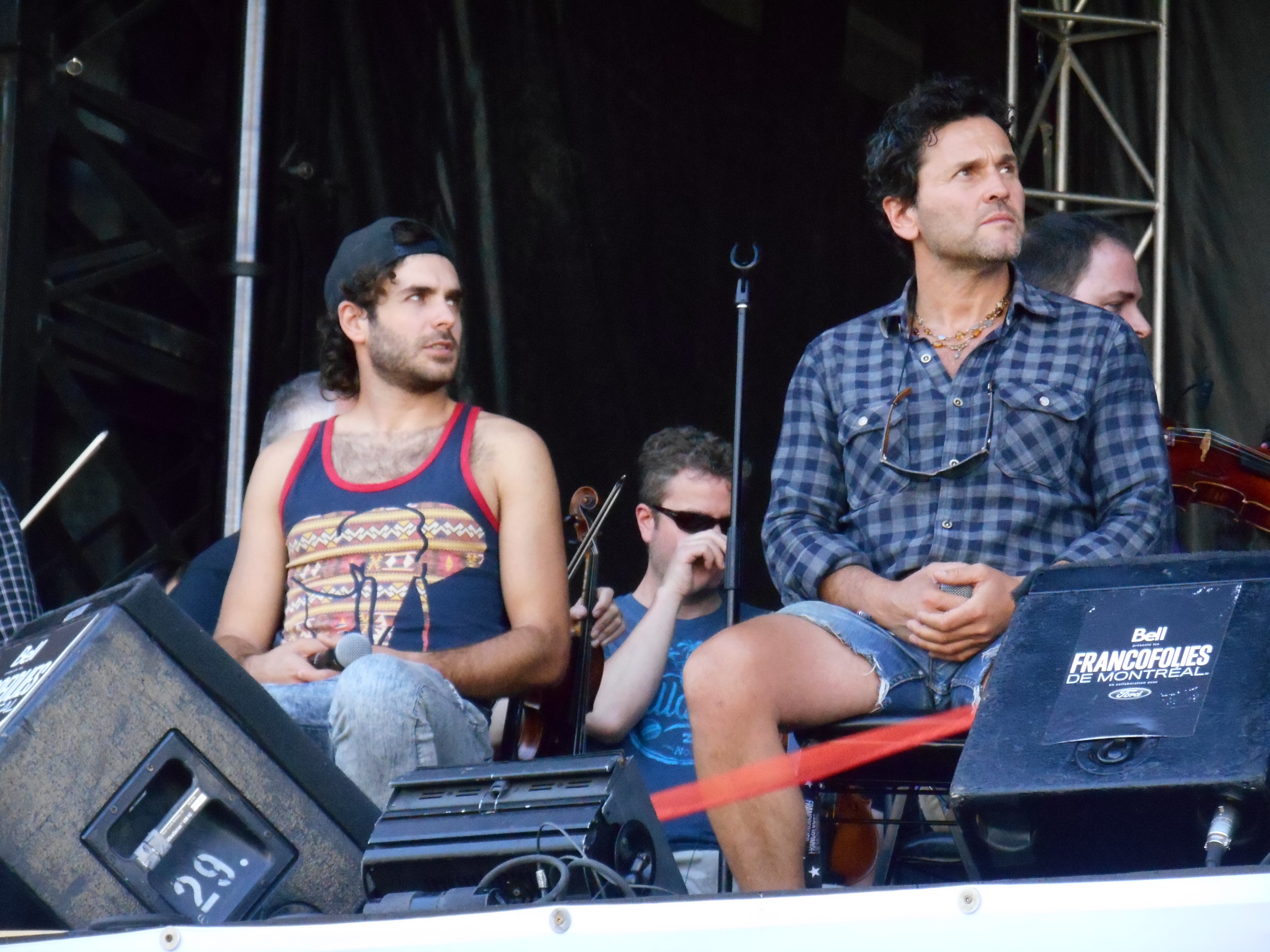
- Martin Léon (R) with Alex Nevsky in 2014

Background information
- Born: April 26, 1966 (age 60); Saint-Roch, Quebec, Canada
- Genres: jazz, pop, electronic, film music
- Occupations: singer-songwriter, composer
- Years active: 1990s-present
- Formerly of: Ann Victor

Martin Léon (born April 26, 1966) is a Canadian singer-songwriter and composer from Quebec, most noted as a three-time winner of the Prix Jutra/Iris for Best Original Music.

== Background ==
Originally from the Saint-Roch quarter of Quebec City, he studied contemporary music at the Université de Montréal, and subsequently had a seven-week apprenticeship under Ennio Morricone in 1995.

With Geneviève Bilodeau he formed the jazz-pop duo Ann Victor, who won CKOI-FM's L’empire des futures stars competition in 1997 and were nominated in several categories at the 21st Félix Awards in 1999 for their album Ciné-parc.

Following the band's breakup, he then released four albums as a solo artist between 2002 and 2010, as well as composing music for a number of documentary projects, before turning actively to film composition with Aurelie Laflamme's Diary (Le Journal d'Aurélie Laflamme).

== Discography ==
- Ciné-parc - 1998, with Ann Victor
- Kiki BBQ - 2002
- Le facteur vent - 2007
- Moon Grill - 2009
- Les Atomes - 2010

== Filmography ==
- Le Compteur d'oiseaux - 2004
- Voici l'homme - 2006
- Planète prise - 2007-2009
- Aurelie Laflamme's Diary (Le Journal d'Aurélie Laflamme) - 2010
- Monsieur Lazhar - 2011
- Rapailler l'homme - 2012
- 1000 Days for the Planet: The Human Adventure - 2013
- The Good Lie - 2014
- Our Loved Ones (Les êtres chers) - 2015
- My Internship in Canada (Guibord s'en va-t-en guerre) - 2015
- The 3 L'il Pigs 2 (Les 3 p'tits cochons 2) - 2016
- Kiss Me Like a Lover (Embrasse-moi comme tu m'aimes) - 2016
- Testament - 2016
- Thanks for Everything (Merci pour tout) - 2019
- My Salinger Year - 2020
- High Wire (Sur la corde raide) - 2020
- You Will Remember Me (Tu te souviendras de moi) - 2020
- Le Temps des framboises - 2022
- Harvey - 2023
- Lucy Grizzli Sophie - 2024
- Lovely Day (Mille secrets mille dangers) - 2025
- The Parking Spot (La Place) - 2026

== Awards ==
Award	Year	Category	Work	Result	Ref(s)
Genie Awards	2012	Best Original Score	Monsieur Lazhar	Nominated	
Canadian Screen Awards	2016	Best Original Song	"Red and Yellow" from Our Loved Ones (Les Êtres chers)	Nominated	
Jutra/Iris Awards	2011	Best Original Music	Aurelie Laflamme's Diary (Le Journal d'Aurélie Laflamme)	Nominated	
Jutra/Iris Awards	2012	Best Original Music	Monsieur Lazhar	Won	
Jutra/Iris Awards	2016	Best Original Music	My Internship in Canada (Guibord s'en va-t-en guerre)	Won	
Jutra/Iris Awards	2017	Best Original Music	Kiss Me Like a Lover (Embrasse-moi comme tu m'aimes)	Nominated	
Jutra/Iris Awards	2021	Best Original Music	My Salinger Year (Mon année Salinger)	Won	
Jutra/Iris Awards	2023	Best Original Music	You Will Remember Me (Tu te souviendras de moi)	Nominated	
