= Dorothée Berryman =

Canadian actress

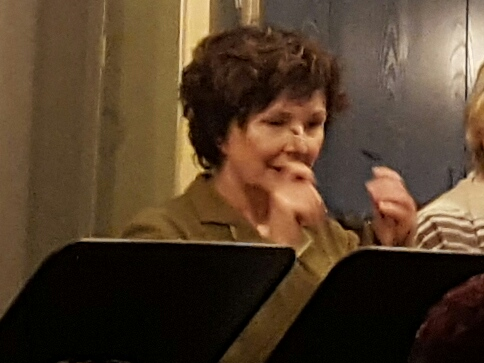

Background information
- Born: April 28, 1948 (age 78); Quebec City, Quebec, Canada
- Genre: Vocal jazz
- Occupations: Actress, Singer
- Instrument: Vocals

Dorothée Berryman (born April 28, 1948) is a Canadian actress and singer from Quebec.

== Career ==
Berryman appeared on stage while she was still a student at Laval University. Active since 1971, she pursued a career in musical theatre and television as a character actress and singer. She began to appear in films in the mid-1970s, her first significant role being the wife of the philandering husband played by Rémy Girard in The Decline of the American Empire (Le Déclin de l'empire américain), for which she received a Genie Award nomination. She appeared in The Red Violin, and reprised her character from Le Déclin in The Barbarian Invasions (Les Invasions barbares).

She has also appeared in The Mob (La Gammick), Scanners II: The New Order, The Caretaker's Lodge (La Conciergerie), Zigrail, Ice Cream, Chocolate and Other Consolations (Crème glacée, chocolat et autres consolations), The Comeback (Cabotins), French Immersion, Ciao Bella, Jack Paradise: Montreal by Night (Jack Paradise : Les nuits de Montréal) and Night Song.

She won the Jutra Award for Best Supporting Actress at the 13th Jutra Awards for The Comeback.

Fluently bilingual in French and English, Berryman has appeared in American productions, including the role of Mary Todd Lincoln in the 2000 television movie, Jackie Bouvier Kennedy Onassis. Berryman is also a jazz singer who has released two albums on La Tribu and hosted jazz programming on the Espace musique radio network.
