= Amsterdam (2013 film) =

- Film poster
- Directed by: Stefan Miljevic
- Written by: Louis Champagne; Stefan Miljevic; Gabriel Sabourin
- Produced by: Antonello Cozzolino; Josée Vallée
- Starring: Gabriel Sabourin; Louis Champagne; Robin Aubert; Suzanne Clément
- Cinematography: Jérôme Sabourin
- Edited by: Carina Baccanale
- Music by: Ramachandra Borcar
- Production company: Attraction Images
- Release date: September 28, 2013
- Running time: 107 minutes
- Country: Canada
- Language: French

Amsterdam is a 2013 Canadian comedy-drama film directed by Stefan Miljevic. The film centres on Jeff (Gabriel Sabourin), Marc (Louis Champagne) and Sam (Robin Aubert), three friends from Quebec who plan a weekend fishing trip that unexpectedly turns into an impromptu flight to Amsterdam, where Sam reveals that his wife Madeleine (Suzanne Clément) is pregnant and he does not want to return home.

The film received two Canadian Screen Award nominations at the 2nd Canadian Screen Awards, for Best Editing (Carina Baccanale) and Best Overall Sound (Arnaud Derimay, Benoît Leduc and Stéphane Bergeron).
