= Pompei (2019 film) =

2019 drama film

- Directed by: Anna Falguères; John Shank
- Written by: Anna Falguères; John Shank
- Produced by: Joseph Rouschop; Valérie Bournonville; Clément Duboin; Kim McCraw; Jasmyrh Lemoine; Luc Déry
- Starring: Aliocha Schneider; Garance Marillier; Vincent Rottiers; Auguste Wilhelm
- Cinematography: Florian Berutti
- Edited by: Julie Brenta
- Music by: Frannie Holder; Charles Lavoie
- Production companies: Tarantula; Good Fortune Films micro_scope
- Distributed by: Mongrel Media
- Release date: September 6, 2019 (TIFF)
- Running time: 95 minutes
- Countries: Belgium; Canada; France
- Language: French

Pompei is a drama film, directed by Anna Falguères and John Shank and released in 2019. A coproduction of companies from Belgium, Canada and France, the film centres on a small group of aimless young people engaging in petty crime.

The film stars Aliocha Schneider, Garance Marillier, Vincent Rottiers and Auguste Wilhelm.

The film premiered in the Discovery stream at the 2019 Toronto International Film Festival.
