= And the Birds Rained Down =

2019 Canadian film directed by Louise Archambault

- Film poster
- French: Il pleuvait des oiseaux
- Directed by: Louise Archambault
- Written by: Louise Archambault
- Based on: Il pleuvait des oiseaux by Jocelyne Saucier
- Produced by: Ginette Petit
- Starring: Rémy Girard; Gilbert Sicotte; Andrée Lachapelle; Ève Landry
- Cinematography: Mathieu Laverdière
- Edited by: Richard Comeau
- Production company: Les Films Outsiders
- Distributed by: MK2 Mile End; Indie Sales
- Release date: September 7, 2019 (TIFF)
- Running time: 127 minutes
- Country: Canada
- Language: French

And the Birds Rained Down (French: Il pleuvait des oiseaux) is a 2019 Canadian drama film, directed by Louise Archambault. An adaptation of the novel by Jocelyne Saucier, the film centres on a group of senior citizens living off-the-grid in a wilderness setting, whose orderly and quiet lives are threatened by changes in their personal group dynamics after the death of the group leader and the arrival of a new outsider.

The film's cast includes Rémy Girard, Gilbert Sicotte, Andrée Lachapelle, Ève Landry, Louise Portal, Éric Robidoux, Marie-Ginette Guay and Kenneth Welsh. It was Lachapelle's final film role before her death, and one of the last film roles for Welsh before his.

== Premise ==
Ted (Welsh), Charlie (Sicotte) and Tom (Girard) are three elderly men who have withdrawn from society, and are living off-the-grid at a wilderness cabin. Their only connection to the outside world is Steve (Éric Robidoux), the manager of a hotel in the nearby town who visits weekly to bring them food and supplies in exchange for a share of the marijuana that they illegally grow onsite.

One morning, however, Ted dies in his sleep; as he was effectively the group leader, this leaves Charlie and Tom a bit out of sorts. Soon afterward, their lives are further disrupted when Steve brings his aunt Gertrude (Lachapelle), who does not want to return to the assisted living facility where she has been living for many years, to live with them; she further decides to break from her past by dropping the name Gertrude and going by Marie-Desneige. At the same time Raf (Landry), a local photographer who is trying to document the relatively few remaining survivors of a forest fire that devastated the region decades earlier, arrives in search of Ted. Meanwhile, there is the threat of another forest fire nearby that may further disrupt their lives.

== Release ==
The film premiered at the 2019 Toronto International Film Festival, and was commercially released to theatres in September 2019.

== Critical response ==
Jonathan Holland of The Hollywood Reporter wrote that "The stage is thus set for an On Golden Pond-style, comfortable third-age drama with a light comic edge, but Birds ends up going much deeper and darker than that as the script, driven along by beautifully nuanced performances from its central trio, leads us into some quite unexpected areas. The first, wonderful exchange of glances between Gertrude and Charlie (on arrival, she symbolically casts away her troubled institutionalized past by renaming herself “Marie-Desneige”) indeed develops into a tremulous octogenarian love affair as Charlie takes her under his wing and shows her a whole new life, not just of stolen, old-folk kisses but of full-blown sensuality. Their nighttime conversations across a darkened room — like those of kids in summer camp, except they're 80 — are among the pic's most memorable scenes as their inevitably painful back stories start to emerge."

Norman Wilner of Now rated the film four N's, writing that "It’s muted and moving, patiently assembling its characters and gliding alongside them, offering us a sense of individual stories coming together. The narrative balances its familiarity with texture and feeling there aren’t too many surprises, but Archambault offers a specificity – a sense of people and place – that grows richer and more moving as her film unfolds." He particularly praised the performances of Sicotte, Girard and Lachapelle, writing that "Sicotte and Girard are enthralling as the aging heroes, who treasure their shared solitude but are willing to welcome people in need, and Lachapelle – who died last fall – delivers an exquisitely felt valedictory performance as a woman experiencing life for the first time."

Janet Smith of The Georgia Straight wrote that "what stands out most is the fully fleshed old folks here—figuratively as well as literally. With few words, Sicotte and Lachapelle show stirrings rarely portrayed in the elderly, and not just the erotic kind. The octagenarians’ subtle lessons about living in the moment should translate easily to anyone decades younger."

== Accolades ==
In December 2019, the film was named to TIFF's annual year-end Canada's Top Ten list.

The film was nominated for five Canadian Screen Awards, with Girard winning for Best Supporting Actor.

Award	Date of ceremony	Category	Recipient(s)	Result	Ref(s)
Canadian Screen Awards	May 28, 2020	Best Adapted Screenplay	Louise Archambault	Nominated	
Canadian Screen Awards	May 28, 2020	Best Actor	Gilbert Sicotte	Nominated	
Canadian Screen Awards	May 28, 2020	Best Supporting Actor	Rémy Girard	Won	
Canadian Screen Awards	May 28, 2020	Best Costume Design	Caroline Poirier	Nominated	
Canadian Screen Awards	May 28, 2020	Best Overall Sound	Jean Camden, Sylvain Bellemare, Bernard Gariépy Strobl, Stéphane Larivière	Nominated	
Gothenburg Film Festival	January 24–February 3, 2020	Dragon Award		Won	
Prix Iris	June 10, 2020	Best Film	Ginette Petit	Nominated	
Prix Iris	June 10, 2020	Best Actor	Gilbert Sicotte	Won	
Prix Iris	June 10, 2020	Best Actress	Andrée Lachapelle	Won	
Prix Iris	June 10, 2020	Best Supporting Actor	Rémy Girard	Nominated	
Prix Iris	June 10, 2020	Best Supporting Actress	Ève Landry	Nominated	
Prix Iris	June 10, 2020	Best Screenplay	Louise Archambault	Nominated	
Prix Iris	June 10, 2020	Best Cinematography	Mathieu Laverdière	Nominated	
Prix Iris	June 10, 2020	Best Art Direction	Marie-Claude Gosselin, Jean Lebourdais	Nominated	
Prix Iris	June 10, 2020	Best Original Music	Andréa Bélanger, David Ratté	Nominated	
Prix Iris	June 10, 2020	Best Costume Design	Caroline Poirier	Nominated	
Prix Iris	June 10, 2020	Best Hairstyling	Martin Lapointe	Nominated	
Prix Iris	June 10, 2020	Best Casting	Karel Quinn, Lucie Robitaille	Nominated	
Prix Iris	June 10, 2020	Public Prize		Won	
San Sebastián International Film Festival	September 20–28, 2019	Guipuzcoan Blood-Donors' Association Corresponding to the Solidarity Award		Won	
Toronto Film Critics Association	March 9, 2021	Rogers Best Canadian Film Award	Louise Archambault	Runner-up	
