= Vincent Bilodeau =

Canadian actor

Vincent Bilodeau (born August 11, 1951) is a French Canadian actor and comedian from Quebec.

== Career ==
Vincent Bilodeau appeared in many feature films including A Sunday in Kigali in 2006.

== Private life ==
He is the brother of Yvon Bilodeau and the uncle of Guillaume Bilodeau.

== Filmography ==
- 1974: La Petite Patrie (TV series): Clément Germain
- 1985: Manon (TV series): Dr. Stéphane Joly
- 1991: Lance et compte: Tous pour un (TV): Jean-Marie Monette
- 1992: Dominique (TV series): Pierre-Luc
- 1993: Au nom du père et du fils (TV series): Honoré Villeneuve
- 1999: Radio (TV series)
- 2001: Soft Shell Man (Un crabe dans la tête): Gallery director
- 2002: Chaos and Desire (La Turbulence des fluides): Simon Deslandes
- 2002: The Negro (Le nèg'): Garry Racine
- 2003: L'Auberge du chien noir (TV series): Richard St-Maurice
- 2003: 20h17 rue Darling: Lt. Geoffrion
- 2003: Gaz Bar Blues: Mononc' Boivin
- 2004: Les Bougon (TV series): Chabot
- 2004: Temps dur (TV series): Donald Sigouin
- 2004: Les Ménés: Michel Mouky
- 2005: René Lévesque: Georges-Émile Lapalme
- 2006: A Sunday in Kigali (Un dimanche à Kigali)
- 2007: Bob Gratton : Ma Vie, My Life (TV series): Rodger Gratton
- 2009: A Happy Man (Le Bonheur de Pierre)
- 2010: Stay with Me (Reste avec moi): Florian
- 2018: Discussions avec mes parents (TV series): Jean-Pierre Morency
- 2019: We Are Gold (Nous sommes Gold)
