= City of Shadows (2010 film) =

- Film poster
- French: La Cité
- Directed by: Kim Nguyen
- Written by: Kim Nguyen
- Produced by: Yves Fortin; André Martin
- Starring: Jean-Marc Barr; Claude Legault; Pierre Lebeau
- Cinematography: Nicolas Bolduc
- Edited by: Richard Comeau; Louis-Philippe Rathé
- Music by: Philippe Héritier
- Production companies: Bohemian Films; Productions Thalie
- Release date: February 8, 2010 (SBIFF)
- Running time: 82 minutes
- Country: Canada
- Language: French

City of Shadows (French: La Cité) is a 2010 Canadian drama film, written and directed by Kim Nguyen. Partially inspired by but not a direct adaptation of Albert Camus's novel The Plague, the film stars Jean-Marc Barr as Maxime Vincent, a war doctor serving in North Africa who comes across a city dealing with an outbreak of bubonic plague.

The cast also includes Claude Legault, Pierre Lebeau, Sabine Karsenti, Lotfi Abdelli and Lotfi Dziri.

The film was shot in Tunisia in 2008, but commercial release was delayed until 2010 by financial problems at original distributor Christal Films.

It received five Jutra Award nominations at the 13th Jutra Awards, for Best Director (Nguyen), Best Cinematography (Nicolas Bolduc), Best Art Direction (Patrice Vermette), Best Costume Design (Mariane Carter) and Best Original Music (Philippe Héritier).
