= The Child Prodigy =

2010 Canadian film directed by Luc Dionne

- French: L'Enfant prodige
- Directed by: Luc Dionne
- Written by: Luc Dionne
- Produced by: Denise Robert; Daniel Louis
- Starring: Guillaume Lebon; Patrick Drolet; Marc Labrèche; Macha Grenon; Karine Vanasse
- Cinematography: Bruce Chun; Daniel Jobin
- Edited by: Jean-François Bergeron
- Production company: Cinémaginaire
- Distributed by: Alliance Vivafilm
- Release date: May 28, 2010
- Running time: 101 minutes
- Country: Canada
- Language: French

The Child Prodigy (French: L'Enfant prodige) is a 2010 French-language Canadian drama film, directed by Luc Dionne and released in 2010. A biographical drama about classical pianist André Mathieu, the film stars Guillaume Lebon as Mathieu in childhood and Patrick Drolet as Mathieu in adulthood.

Its cast also includes Marc Labrèche as his father Rodolphe Mathieu, Macha Grenon as his mother Mimi Gagnon Mathieu and Karine Vanasse as his sister Camillette, as well as Lothaire Bluteau, François Papineau, Isabel Richer, Catherine Trudeau, Albert Millaire, Benoît Brière and Mitsou Gélinas in supporting roles.

The film received two Jutra Award nominations at the 13th Jutra Awards in 2011, for Best Art Direction (Michel Proulx) and Best Costume Design (Francesca Chamberland).
