= Michel La Veaux =

Canadian cinematographer and documentary filmmaker

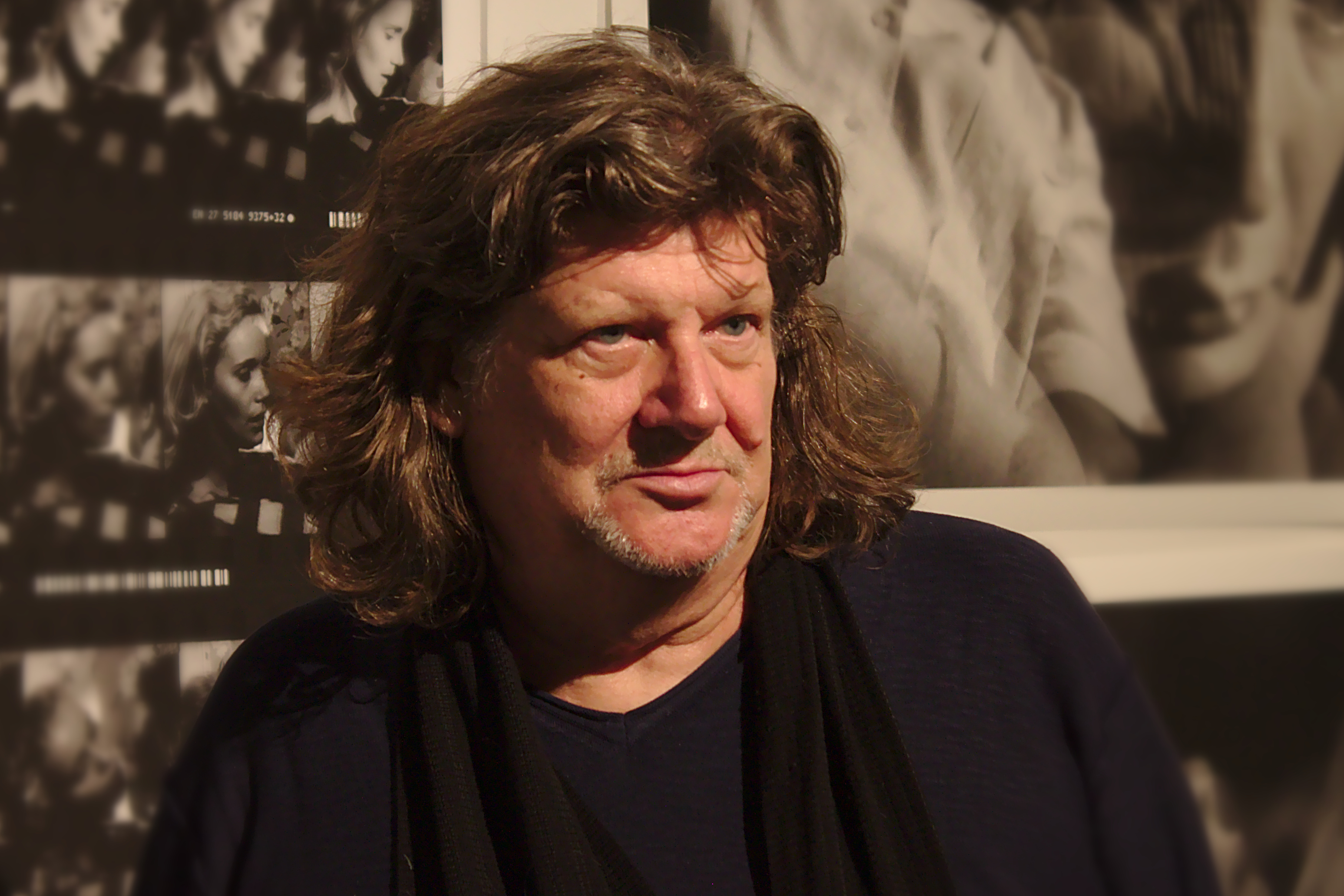
Michel La Veaux in 2019

Michel La Veaux (born January 21, 1955, in Montreal, Quebec) is a Canadian cinematographer and documentary filmmaker. He is most noted for his work on the films The Dismantling (Le Démantèlement), for which he won the Jutra Award for Best Cinematography at the 16th Jutra Awards, and The Fireflies Are Gone (La disparition des lucioles), for which he won the Borsos Competition award for best cinematography in a Canadian film at the 2018 Whistler Film Festival.

La Veaux has also been a Jutra/Iris nominee at the 13th Jutra Awards in 2011 for Mourning for Anna (Trois temps après la mort d'Anna), at the 14th Jutra Awards in 2012 for For the Love of God (Pour l'amour de Dieu) and at the 20th Quebec Cinema Awards in 2018 for Iqaluit, and a Canadian Screen Award nominee for Canadian Screen Award for Best Cinematography at the 3rd Canadian Screen Awards in 2014 for Meetings with a Young Poet.

La Veaux has also directed a number of documentary films, including Hôtel La Louisiane (2015) and Labrecque, une caméra pour la mémoire (2016).
