= Pierre Lebeau =

Canadian film, television, and theater actor

- Born: 22 July 1954 (age 70); Montreal, Quebec, Canada
- Occupation: Actor
- Years active: 1978–present

Pierre Lebeau (born 22 July 1954) is a Canadian actor. He is best known for major roles in Quebec big-box movies such as Séraphin: Heart of Stone and the four-part Les Boys series.

== Life and career ==
His acting career started on the theatrical scene in 1975, after being graduated from the National Theatre School. He played in various plays until the 1990s and one television series in 1978. However it was in 1997 that his career became more prominent with his first major role in Les Boys, playing the role of Meo, who is a friend of Stan (played by Rémy Girard) and businessman in which threaten to take Stan's bar if his garage league hockey team did not defeat this own squad made consisting of several tough players, albeit the Boys had defeated Meo's team. From the second movie, Meo plays in Stan's team after substituting a player. Lebeau played in all four chapters of Les Boys and will also play in the 2007 television mini-series along with most of the same actors that participated for part or all of the tetralogy including Marc Messier, Serge Thériault, Patrick Huard, Girard, Yvan Ponton and Patrick Labbé.

Lebeau's second major role was the main protagonist in Séraphin: Heart of Stone (Séraphin: un homme et son péché), in which he plays the role of Séraphin, the mayor of a fictional village and a mean-spirited miser. Lebeau, for his role in the 2002 movie produced by Charles Binamé, earned himself a Jutra Award for best actor.

Lebeau also played in various movies and television series including Nouvelle-France, L'Incomparable mademoiselle C, Bon Cop, Bad Cop, Fortier, Matroni et Moi, Les Dangereux, L'Odyssée, Urgence and Un gars, une fille. He had three other award nominations, including a Gémeaux Award for Best supporting actor in the Quebec television series Fortier in 2001. Lebeau also had Jutra Award nominations for best supporting actor for Les Boys III in 2001 and Best actor for Matroni et Moi in 2000.

== Filmography ==
=== Television ===
- Journal en images froides (1977)
- Urgence (1996)
- Un gars, une fille (1997)
- Le volcan tranquille (1997)
- Reseaux (1998)
- Tag (2000)
- Fortier (2001–2004)
- La chambre no 13 (2006)
- Les Boys (TV series) (2007)

=== Cinema ===
- Les Boys (I through IV) - 1997–2006)
- The Seat of the Soul (Le siège de l'âme) - 1997
- Mr. Aiello (La Déroute) - 1998
- Matroni and Me (Matroni et moi) - 1999
- The Long Winter (Quand tu serai parti... vous vivrez encore) - 1999
- Maelström - 2000
- Ice Cream, Chocolate and Other Consolations (Crème glacée, chocolat et autres consolations) - 2001
- Alice's Odyssey (L'Odyssée d'Alice Tremblay) - 2002
- Séraphin: Heart of Stone (Séraphin: Un homme et son péché) - 2002
- Chaos and Desire (La turbulence des fluides) - 2002
- Les Dangereux - 2002
- Father and Sons (Père et fils) - 2003
- Red Nose (Nez rouge) - 2003
- Dans l'oeil du chat - 2004
- The Incomparable Miss C. (L'Incomparable mademoiselle C.) - 2004
- Battle of the Brave (Nouvelle-France) - 2004
- 300 secondes - 2005
- The Journals of Knud Rasmussen - 2006
- Bon Cop, Bad Cop - 2006
- Jack and Jacques (Jack et Jacques) - 2006
- L'homme qui attendait - 2006
- Nos voisins Dhantsu - 2006
- Truffles (Truffe) - 2008
- City of Shadows (La Cité) - 2010
- Un cargo pour l'affrique - 2009
- Rabid Dogs - 2015
- The Mother Eagle (Le Sang du pélican) - 2020

=== Théâtre ===
- Cyrano de Bergerac, Théâtre du Nouveau Monde (1996)
- Odyssée de Homère, Théâtre du Nouveau Monde (Février 2000)
