= Mokhtar (film) =

2010 Canadian film

- Film poster
- Directed by: Halima Ouardiri
- Written by: Halima Ouardiri
- Produced by: Halima Ouardiri; Mila Aung-Thwin
- Starring: Omar Belarbi; Abdellah Ichiki; S'Fia Moussa
- Cinematography: Duraid Munajim
- Edited by: Hélène Girard
- Production company: EyeSteelFilm
- Release date: September 14, 2010 (TIFF)
- Running time: 16 minutes
- Country: Canada
- Language: Tashelhit

Mokhtar is a Canadian short drama film, directed by Halima Ouardiri and released in 2010. Shot in Morocco, the film centres on a young boy from a family of goatherds, who brings home an injured owl but must confront his superstitious father's belief that the bird is an omen of bad luck. The film was based on a true story, told to Ouardiri by the handyman who worked for a family she was staying with on a trip to Morocco, about his own childhood experience.

The film premiered at the 2010 Toronto International Film Festival. It was subsequently screened at the 2010 Vancouver International Film Festival, where Ouardiri won the award for Most Promising Director of a Canadian Short Film.

The film was named to TIFF's year-end Canada's Top Ten list for 2010, and was a shortlisted Jutra Award nominee for Best Live Action Short Film at the 13th Jutra Awards in 2011. It was subsequently screened at the 2011 Quebec City Film Festival, where it won the People's Choice award for short films.
