= Curling (film) =

- Film poster
- Directed by: Denis Côté
- Written by: Denis Côté
- Produced by: Denis Côté; Stéphanie Morissette
- Starring: Emmanuel Bilodeau; Philomène Bilodeau; Roc Lafortune; Sophie Desmarais
- Cinematography: Josée Deshaies
- Edited by: Nicolas Roy
- Production company: Nihilproductions
- Distributed by: Métropole Films
- Release date: August 9, 2010; (Locarno)
- Running time: 92 minutes
- Country: Canada
- Language: French
- Budget: C$1.1 million

Curling is a 2010 Canadian drama film written and directed by Denis Côté. The film stars Emmanuel Bilodeau and Philomène Bilodeau as an isolated father and daughter living in rural Quebec. It premiered at the Locarno Film Festival, where it received awards for Best Director and Best Actor, and was later named to the Toronto International Film Festival's Canada's Top Ten list for 2010.

== Synopsis ==
Jean-François is a single father living with his twelve-year-old daughter, Julyvonne, in rural Quebec. Overprotective and isolated, he keeps her largely apart from the outside world while working at a bowling alley and a motel. Their closed-off life is disrupted by a series of unusual events.

== Cast ==
The cast includes:

- Emmanuel Bilodeau as Jean-François Sauvageau
- Philomène Bilodeau as Julyvonne Sauvageau
- Roc Lafortune as Kennedy
- Sophie Desmarais as Isabelle
- Muriel Dutil as Odile
- Yves Trudel as Yvan
- Anie Pascale Robitaille as Mireille
- Johanne Haberlin as Rosie

== Production ==
The film was produced by Nihilproductions. It was written and directed by Denis Côté, who produced it with Stéphanie Morissette. The film was shot in Verdun from January 9 to February 6, 2010. It had a budget of C$1.1 million.

== Reception ==
=== Awards and nominations ===
The film premiered at the Locarno Film Festival, where Côté won Best Director and Emmanuel Bilodeau won Best Actor. It was later named to the Toronto International Film Festival's annual Canada's Top Ten list for 2010. Curling also won the Prix AQCC-SODEC for Best Quebec Feature Film.

At the 13th Jutra Awards, the film received three nominations: Best Film, Best Director for Côté and Best Actor for Bilodeau. It was also nominated for Best French-Language Film at the 17th Lumière Awards in 2012.

=== Critical response ===
Jean-François Rauger of Le Monde described the film as "unusually beautiful". He wrote that its austere realism slowly gives way to elements of horror. He also said that the film stayed mysterious and offered no reassuring explanations, calling it "a brilliant reworking of Psycho".

Andrew Schenker of Slant Magazine described it as a psychological study with careful detail and a strong sense of mystery. He wrote that Côté presents the film’s world as “a series of glimpses that have to be fitted together in the viewer’s mind”.

Filmdienst described the film as a compelling drama in which both the father and daughter encounter unusual events, and said that its visual language is experimental and mysterious.
