= The Comeback (2010 film) =

- Film poster
- French: Cabotins
- Directed by: Alain DesRochers
- Written by: Ian Lauzon
- Produced by: Jacques Bonin
- Starring: Rémy Girard; Dorothée Berryman
- Cinematography: Yves Bélanger
- Edited by: Éric Drouin
- Music by: FM Le Sieur
- Production company: Novem Communications
- Distributed by: Équinoxe
- Release date: July 23, 2010
- Running time: 110 minutes
- Country: Canada
- Language: French

The Comeback (French: Cabotins) is a Canadian comedy film, directed by Alain DesRochers and released in 2010. Set in 1985, the film stars Rémy Girard as Marcel Lajoie, a failing producer of theatrical variety shows who decides to bring his old troupe together for a reunion show.

The cast includes Pierre-François Legendre, Gaston Lepage, Gilles Renaud, Dorothée Berryman, Yves Jacques, Louis Morissette and Guy Nadon.

The film opened in theatres in July 2010.

Berryman won the Jutra Award for Best Supporting Actress at the 13th Jutra Awards. The film was also nominated for Best Art Direction, Best Costume Design, Best Hair and Best Sound.
