= Mourning for Anna =

- Film poster
- French: Trois temps après la mort d'Anna
- Directed by: Catherine Martin
- Written by: Catherine Martin
- Produced by: Claude Cartier
- Starring: Guylaine Tremblay; Denis Bernard; Paule Baillargeon; François Papineau; Gilles Renaud
- Cinematography: Michel La Veaux
- Edited by: Natalie Lamoureux
- Music by: Robert Marcel Lepage
- Production companies: Coop Vidéo de Montréal; ACPAV
- Distributed by: K Films Amérique
- Release date: July 5, 2010 (Karlovy Vary)
- Running time: 87 minutes
- Country: Canada
- Language: French

Mourning for Anna (French: Trois temps après la mort d'Anna, lit. 'Three times after Anna's death') is a Canadian drama film, directed by Catherine Martin and released in 2010. The film stars Guylaine Tremblay as Françoise, a woman struggling to recover emotionally after the murder of her daughter Anna.

The film's cast also includes Denis Bernard, Paule Baillargeon, François Papineau and Gilles Renaud.

== Critical response ==
The film was named to the Toronto International Film Festival's year-end Canada's Top Ten list for 2010. The film received two Prix Jutra nominations at the 13th Jutra Awards, for Best Actress (Tremblay) and Best Cinematography (Michel La Veaux).
