= Stay with Me (2010 film) =

- Film poster
- French: Reste avec moi
- Directed by: Robert Ménard
- Written by: Claire Wojas
- Produced by: Claude Bonin; Robert Ménard
- Starring: Vincent Bilodeau; Danielle Proulx; Maxim Roy; Louis Morissette
- Cinematography: Daniel Jobin
- Edited by: Michel Arcand
- Music by: Michel Cusson
- Production company: Les Productions Vidéofilms
- Distributed by: Les Films Séville
- Release date: October 30, 2010 (Abitibi-Témiscamingue)
- Running time: 98 minutes
- Country: Canada
- Language: French

Stay with Me (French: Reste avec moi) is a 2010 Canadian drama film, directed by Robert Ménard. An ensemble cast drama described by its director as a "choral" film, it tells five interrelated stories about various residents of Montreal who are struggling with their interpersonal relationships.

Florian (Vincent Bilodeau) and Maggie (Danielle Proulx), are a couple whose relationship is tested by Maggie's struggle with alcoholism. Simon (Louis Morissette) and Sophie (Maxim Roy) are a young couple whose joy at Sophie's first pregnancy turns to conflict when medical testing reveals that the baby has Down syndrome. Laurie (Julie Perreault) is the single mother of Ariane (Alexandra Sicard), who is drawn into a fight with the girl's father after she turns out to be allergic to the new kitten he bought her as a gift. Wilfrid Martin (Gérard Poirier) is a lonely older man struggling to cope with the recent death of his wife. Youssef (Joseph Antaki) and Fatima (Fariba Bonakdar) are an immigrant couple coping with the difficulties of adjusting to a new country.

The film premiered on October 30, 2010 at the Abitibi-Témiscamingue International Film Festival before opening commercially on November 5.

The film received three Jutra Award nominations at the 13th Jutra Awards in 2011, for Best Supporting Actor (Poirier), Best Supporting Actress (Proulx) and Best Original Music (Michel Cusson).
