= Emmanuel Bilodeau =

Canadian actor and comedian

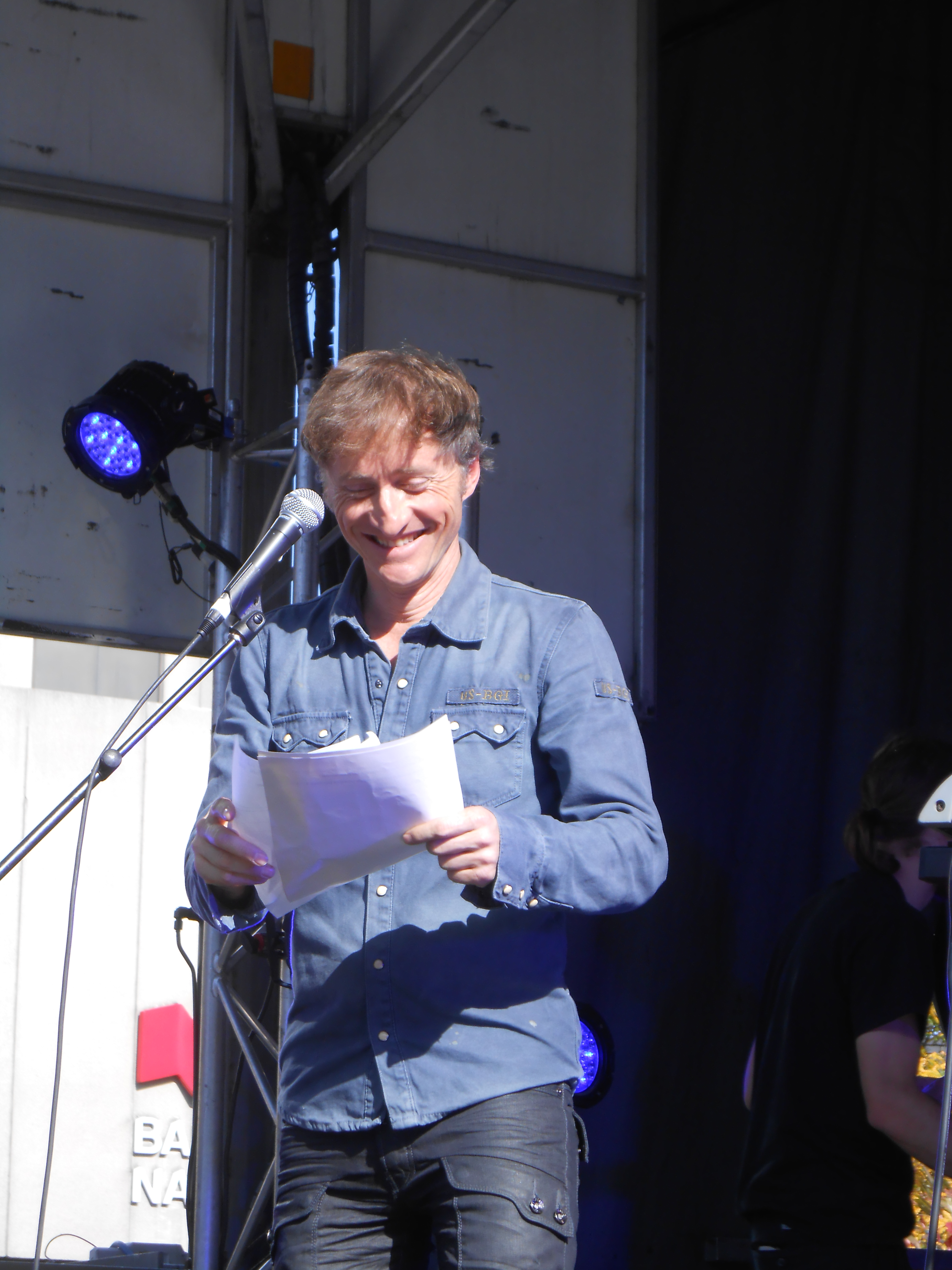
- Born: August 29, 1964 (age 61); Hull, Quebec, Canada
- Occupation: actor
- Years active: 1990s–present
- Notable work: Soft Shell Man, Curling, René Lévesque

Emmanuel Bilodeau (born August 29, 1964) is a Canadian actor from Quebec. He is most noted for his performances in the 2000 film Soft Shell Man (Un crabe dans la tête), for which he won the Jutra Award for Best Supporting Actor at the 4th Jutra Awards in 2002, and the 2006 television miniseries René Lévesque, for which he won the Gémeaux Award for Best Lead Actor in a Drama Series in 2007.

He was also a Jutra nominee for Best Supporting Actor at the 7th Jutra Awards in 2005 for Love and Magnets (Les Aimants) and at the 10th Jutra Awards in 2008 for Bluff, and a nominee for Best Actor at the 13th Jutra Awards in 2011 for Curling.

In addition to his film and television performances, he has also toured two one-man comedy stage shows, One Manu Show in 2014 and Manu Bilodeux dans le pétrin in 2021.

== Personal life ==
He is married to actress Édith Cochrane. In 2021 they starred in the television documentary series C'est plus qu'un jardin, which centred on their process of expanding the gardens at their home to move toward an agricultural lifestyle to become more self-sufficient and reduce their ecological footprint.

He was previously married to actress Monique Spaziani. Their daughter Philomène is an actress, who appeared alongside her father in Curling and starred in the television series Toute la vie.

== Filmography ==
=== Film ===
Year	Title	Role	Notes
1994	Ruth	Jean-Paul	
1994	Chili's Blues (C'était le 12 du 12 et Chili avait les blues)	CN employee	
1996	Poverty and Other Delights (Joyeux Calvaire)		
1997	The Seat of the Soul (Le Siège de l'âme)	Jules	
1998	The Sleep Room	Dandain	
1998	August 32nd on Earth (Un 32 août sur terre)	Friend of Philippe	
1999	The Long Winter (Quand je serai parti... vous vivrez encore)		
2000	Family Pack (Que faisaient les femmes pendant que l'homme marchait sur la Lune ?)	Antoine	
2001	Soft Shell Man (Un crabe dans la tête)	Samuel	
2002	The Negro (Le Nèg')	Canard Plourde	
2003	Gaz Bar Blues	Jocelyn	
2004	Bonzaïon		
2004	Le Golem de Montréal	François	
2004	Taking Lives	Dr. Finn	
2004	TV Dinner...Burp!		
2004	CQ2 (Seek You Too)	Gabriel	
2004	Happy Camper (Camping sauvage)	Ti-Caille	
2004	Love and Magnets (Les Aimants)	Manu	
2004	So the Moon Rises (La Lune viendra d'elle-même)	Lionel	
2005	Maman Last Call	Fernand	
2005	Les Moutons de Jacob		
2006	On the Trail of Igor Rizzi (Sur la trace d'Igor Rizzi)	Gilbert McCoy	
2007	Bluff	Nico	
2010	Curling	Jean-François Sauvageau	
2010	Tough Luck (Y'en aura pas de facile)	René	
2011	Le Colis	Michel Beaulieu	
2015	The Revenant	French interpreter	
2017	Innocent	Francis	
2018	Silence		
2018	Mad Dog Labine	Roch Labine	
2021	Cerceuil, tabarnak!	Raymond Tremblay	
2023	Gaby's Hills (Gaby les collines)	Jasmin	
2026	Tight Lettuce (Tissé serré)	Bodo	

=== Television ===
Year	Title	Role	Notes
1992	Scoop	Journalist	
1993	Blanche	Comedian	
1993	La princesse astronaute	Vladimir	
1995	L'Instit	Patrick Lafontaine	Season 3, episode 5
1997	Le Volcan tranquille	Louis-Joseph Dessables	
1997	Les Bâtisseurs d'eau		
2000	Gypsies	Le Mur	
2001	Si la tendance se maintient	Benoît Drapeau	
2003	Grande Ourse	Armand Laflamme	
2004	Le Sketch Show	Emmanuel	
2006	René Lévesque	René Lévesque	
2008	René Lévesque: Le destin d'un chef	René Lévesque	
2008	Blaise le blasé	Gaétan-Gilbert Pyrowski	
2008	La Cache	Host	
2010	Ni plus ni moi	Marc-Antoine Lecours	
2010	Belle-Baie	Charles Paulin	
2010	Tranches de vies		
2015	Pour Sarah	Gilles Simoneau	
2021	C'est plus qu'un jardin	Himself	
