= Aliocha Schneider =

Canadian actor and musician (born 1993)

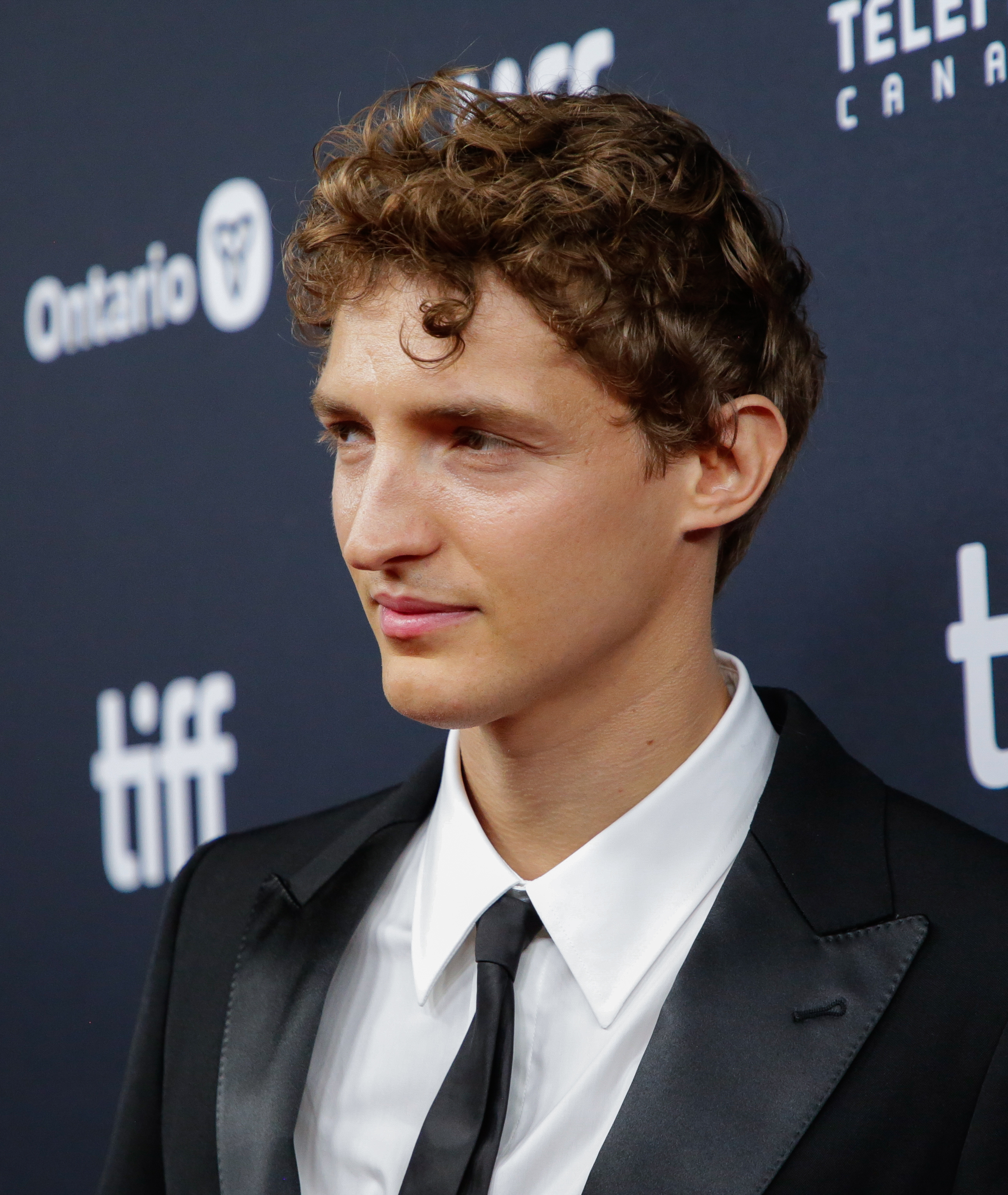
- Schneider in 2024
- Born: 21 September 1993 (age 32); Paris, France
- Occupations: Actor; singer
- Years active: 2008–present
- Partner: Charlotte Cardin (2016–present)
- Relatives: Niels Schneider (brother)

Aliocha Schneider (French pronunciation: [aljɔʃa ʃnɛdɛʁ]; born 21 September 1993) is a French-Canadian actor and musician who was born in Paris, France, but grew up in Quebec, Canada. He is most noted for his roles in the films Aurelie Laflamme's Diary (Le Journal d'Aurélie Laflamme), Closet Monster and Pompei.

He acted in several plays including the role of Momo in the stage adaptation of The Life Before Us with the Théâtre du Rideau Vert.

As a musician, he released his debut album, Eleven Songs, in 2017. His second album, Naked, followed in 2020.

== Personal life ==
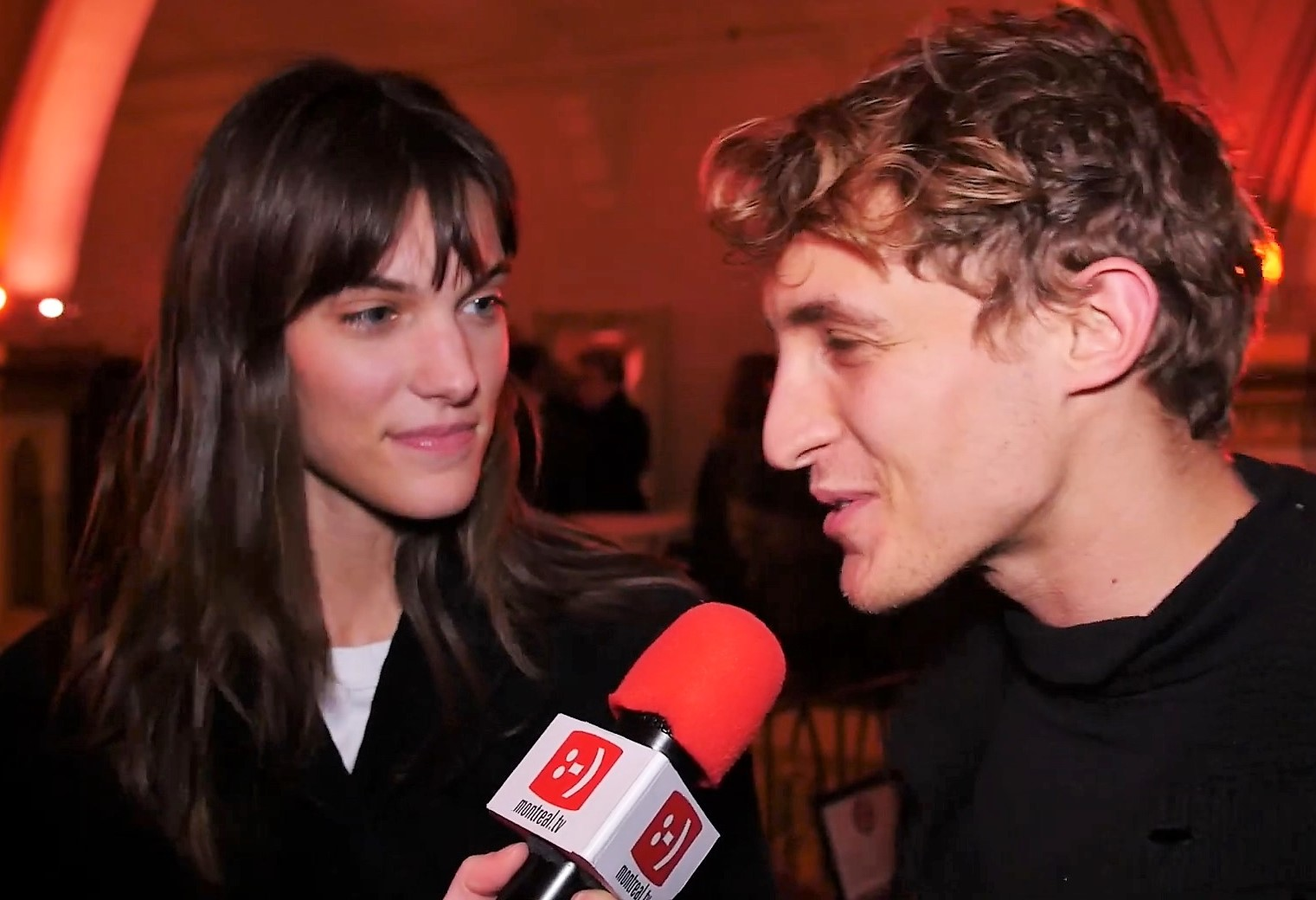
Charlotte Cardin and Schneider interviewed by Montreal.TV in 2018

He was born as one of five sons in an acting family. Their father, Jean-Claude Schneider, was an actor, and mother Isabella was a model. His younger brother, Vassili Schneider, and three older brothers, Vadim, Volodia (also a drummer), and Niels Schneider, are also actors.His paternal grandmother was a Russian Jewish immigrant to France, who came with her family as a child when they fled the Russian Revolution in 1920.

In September 2003, his eldest brother, actor Vadim Schneider, died alongside his co-star Jaclyn Linetsky in a road accident while driving to the filming of an episode of 15/Love. Their minivan lost control and collided with oncoming traffic. Both were 17 years old.

== Selected filmography ==
Year	Title	Role	Notes
2009	Snow Hides the Shade of Fig Trees (La neige cache l'ombre des figuiers)	Sacha	
2010	The Last Escape (La dernière fugue)	Sam	
2010	Aurelie Laflamme's Diary (Le Journal d'Aurélie Laflamme)	Nicolas Dubuc	
2013	The Four Soldiers (Les 4 soldats)	Kevin	
2015	The Tournament	Anthony	
2015	Aurelie Laflamme: Somewhat Grounded (Aurélie Laflamme: Les pieds sur terre)	Nicolas Dubuc	
2015	Ville-Marie	Thomas	
2015	Closet Monster	Wilder	
2016	The New Life of Paul Sneijder (La Nouvelle Vie de Paul Sneijder)	Hugo	
2019	Pompei	Victor	
2019	Thanks for Everything (Merci pour tout)	Bruno	
2020	Vampires (Netflix series)	Ladislas Nemeth	
2023	Music		
2023	Greek Salad (Amazon Prime Video series)	Tom	
2024	Family Therapy	Julien	

== Music ==
=== Discography ===
- Eleven Songs (2017)
- Naked (2020)
- Aliocha Schneider (2023)

=== Awards and achievements ===
- EP Sorry Eyes nominated for the best Folk EP at GAMIQ, 2017
- Sorry Eyes nominated for the best Folk/Singer-songwriter song at The IMAs
