= Halima Ouardiri =

Swiss-Canadian film director

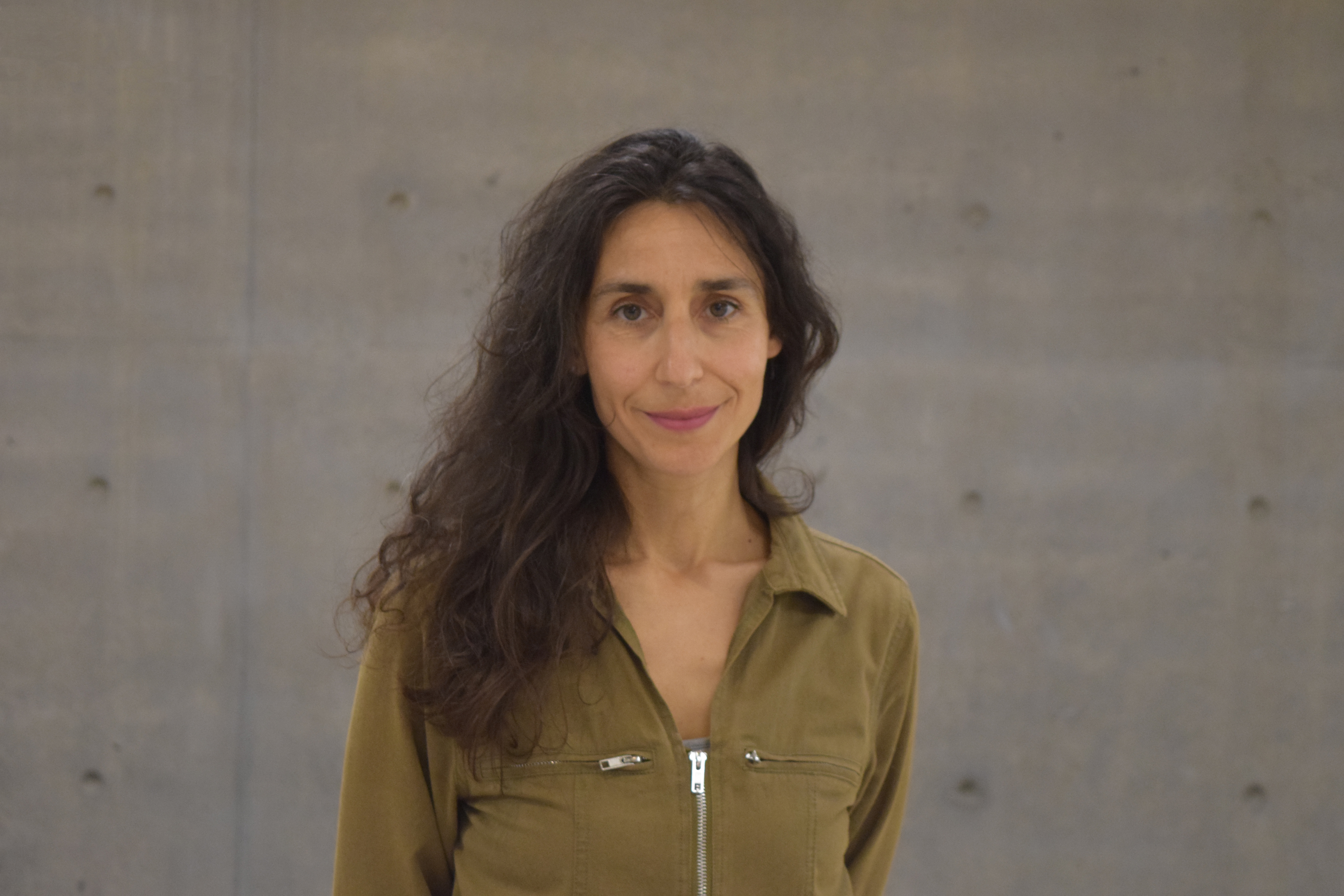
- Ouardiri in 2023
- Born: Halima Ouardiri; Geneva, Switzerland
- Occupations: Film director, screenwriter, producer
- Years active: 2000s–present

Halima Ouardiri is a Swiss-Canadian film director, screenwriter, and producer.

== Career ==
Ouardiri began pursuing a career in the arts, specifically in film, in the 2000s. She first garnered acclaim for her 2010 short film Mokhtar, which was a shortlisted Jutra Award nominee for Best Live Action Short Film at the 13th Jutra Awards in 2011, and her 2019 short film Mutts (Clebs), which won a Crystal Bear for best short film in the Generation 14Plus program at the 70th Berlin International Film Festival in 2020.

Born in Geneva to a Swiss mother and a Moroccan father, Ouardiri moved to Montreal to study film at the Mel Hoppenheim School of Cinema.

In addition to her own films, she was credited as a producer on Kalina Bertin's 2017 documentary film Manic.

In 2018, she was one of eight women filmmakers selected for the Academy of Canadian Cinema and Television's Apprenticeship for Women Directors program, alongside Kathleen Hepburn, Kirsten Carthew, Alicia K. Harris, Allison White, Asia Youngman, Tiffany Hsiung, and Kristina Wagenbauer.

Ouardiri's first narrative feature film, The Camel Driving School, is in development. The project won the Atlas development prize at the 2023’s edition of the Atlas Workshops.

Her latest short film The Skates (Les Patins) is slated to screen in the Short Cuts program at the 2023 Toronto International Film Festival.
