= Évelyne Rompré =

Canadian actress from Quebec (born 1975)

Évelyne Rompré (born March 4, 1975) is a Canadian actress from Quebec. She is most noted for her performance in the 2010 film Twice a Woman (Deux fois une femme), for which she received a Jutra Award nomination for Best Actress at the 13th Jutra Awards in 2011.

She has also appeared in the films August 32nd on Earth (Un 32 août sur terre), Inséparables, A Girl at the Window (Une jeune fille à la fenêtre), Family History (Histoire de famille), It's Not Me, I Swear! (C'est pas moi, je le jure!), Laughter (Le Rire) and Social Hygiene (Hygiène sociale), and the television series Au nom de la loi, La Job and L'Auberge du chien noir, and has acted on stage in theatrical productions.

She is a 1997 graduate of the Conservatoire de musique et d'art dramatique du Québec.
