= Aurelie Laflamme's Diary =

- Film poster
- French: Le Journal d'Aurélie Laflamme
- Directed by: Christian Laurence
- Written by: India Desjardins; Christian Laurence
- Based on: Le Journal d'Aurélie Laflamme by India Desjardins
- Produced by: Claude Veillet
- Starring: Marianne Verville; Geneviève Chartrand; Édith Cochrane; Aliocha Schneider
- Cinematography: Geneviève Perron
- Edited by: Hubert Hayaud
- Music by: Martin Léon
- Production company: Les Films Vision 4
- Distributed by: TVA Films
- Release date: 23 April 2010
- Running time: 108 minutes
- Country: Canada
- Language: French

Aurelie Laflamme's Diary (French: Le Journal d'Aurélie Laflamme) is a Canadian comedy-drama film, directed by Christian Laurence and released in 2010. Based on the Aurélie Laflamme series of young adult novels by India Desjardins, the film stars Marianne Verville as the titular Aurélie Laflamme, a 14-year-old girl who feels like an outsider and is trying to figure out her place in the world.

The film's cast includes Geneviève Chartrand as Aurélie's best friend Kat, Édith Cochrane as her mother, and Aliocha Schneider as her love interest Nicolas.

The film opened in theatres in April 2010.

The film received three Jutra Award nominations at the 13th Jutra Awards in 2011, for Best Supporting Actress (Chartrand), Best Costume Design (Julie-Anne Tremblay) and Best Original Music (Martin Léon).

A sequel film, Aurelie Laflamme: Somewhat Grounded (Aurélie Laflamme: Les pieds sur terre), was released in 2015.
