= Twice a Woman (2010 film) =

2010 Canadian drama film

- Directed by: François Delisle
- Written by: François Delisle
- Produced by: François Delisle
- Starring: Évelyne Rompré
- Cinematography: Mathieu Laverdière
- Edited by: Pascale Paroissien
- Music by: François Delisle
- Production company: Films 53/12
- Distributed by: Funfilm Distribution
- Release date: October 25, 2010
- Running time: 94 minutes
- Country: Canada
- Language: French

Twice a Woman (French: Deux fois une femme) is a Canadian drama film, directed by François Delisle and released in 2010. The film stars Évelyne Rompré as Catherine, a woman fleeing an abusive marriage to start a new life.

The cast also includes Marc Béland, Marie Brassard, Brigitte Pogonat, Catherine De Léan, Michelle Rossignol and Martin Dubreuil.

The film received two Jutra Award nominations at the 13th Jutra Awards in 2011, for Best Actress (Rompré) and Best Makeup (Mélanie Turcotte, Mario Soucy).
