= 7 Days (2010 film) =

- Official teaser poster
- Directed by: Daniel Grou
- Written by: Patrick Senécal
- Produced by: Nicole Robert
- Starring: Rémy Girard; Claude Legault; Fanny Mallette
- Cinematography: Bernard Couture
- Edited by: Valérie Héroux
- Production company: Go Films
- Distributed by: Alliance Vivafilm; Seville Pictures
- Release date: January 22, 2010
- Running time: 111 minutes
- Country: Canada
- Language: French

7 Days (French: Les Sept Jours du talion, lit. 'The Seven Days of Retaliation') is a 2010 Canadian psychological horror tragedy film directed by Daniel Grou and starring Claude Legault. The screenplay was written by Patrick Senécal and based on his novel Les sept jours du talion.

== Plot ==
The ordinary life of surgeon Bruno Hamel (Claude Legault) is destroyed when his daughter Jasmine (Rose-Marie Coallier) is raped and murdered in a park. Upon learning that the police apprehended the prime suspect, laborer Anthony Lemaire (Martin Dubreuil), Hamel plans to take revenge. He abducts Lemaire while he is being brought to his trial by drugging the officer driving the transport vehicle and brings him to a secluded cabin. Using a remote-controlled computer to conceal his location, Hamel calls the police to inform them that he plans to murder Lemaire in seven days, the seventh day being Jasmine's birthday. After killing him, Hamel will give himself up to the police.

Police detective Mercure (Rémy Girard) leads the investigation to discover Hamel's whereabouts. Mercure himself suffered a personal tragedy when his wife was killed during a grocery store robbery. Though Mercure acknowledges that the imprisonment of his wife's killer has not made his life more bearable, he becomes determined to stop Hamel before he commits murder.

Over the course of the seven days, Hamel brutally tortures Lemaire. Initially frightened and in incredible pain, Lemaire starts to accept his fate and mocks Hamel for not enjoying himself as he inflicts painful injuries on him. Lemaire eventually admits to raping and murdering Jasmine, along with three other girls. Hamel contacts a news station to have the families of Lemaire's victims informed about his captive's confession. When the mother of one of Lemaire's victims disapproves of his actions, Hamel kidnaps her and forces her to see Lemaire.

By the seventh day, the police locate Hamel's cabin. Hamel gives himself up and lets Lemaire live. As the police lead him away, a reporter asks him if he still believes vengeance is right. Hamel responds with a "No." However, when asked if he regrets what he has done, he gives the same answer.

== Cast ==
- Claude Legault as Bruno Hamel
- Rémy Girard as Hervé Mercure
- Martin Dubreuil as Anthony Lemaire
- Fanny Mallette as Sylvie Hamel
- Rose-Marie Coallier as Jasmine Hamel
- Alexandre Goyette as Michel Boisevert
- Dominique Quesnel as Maryse Pleau
- Pascale Delhaes as Diane Masson
- Pascal Contamine as Gaétan Morin
- Daniel Desputeau as Gilles, Médecin

== Release and reception ==
The film premiered on 22 January 2010 at Sundance Film Festival, as World Premiere.

Upon release, critics reacted favorably towards the film. On Rotten Tomatoes, the film has an approval rating of 80%, based on 15 reviews.
