= Rémy Girard =

Canadian actor and television host (born 1950)

Rémy Girard OC
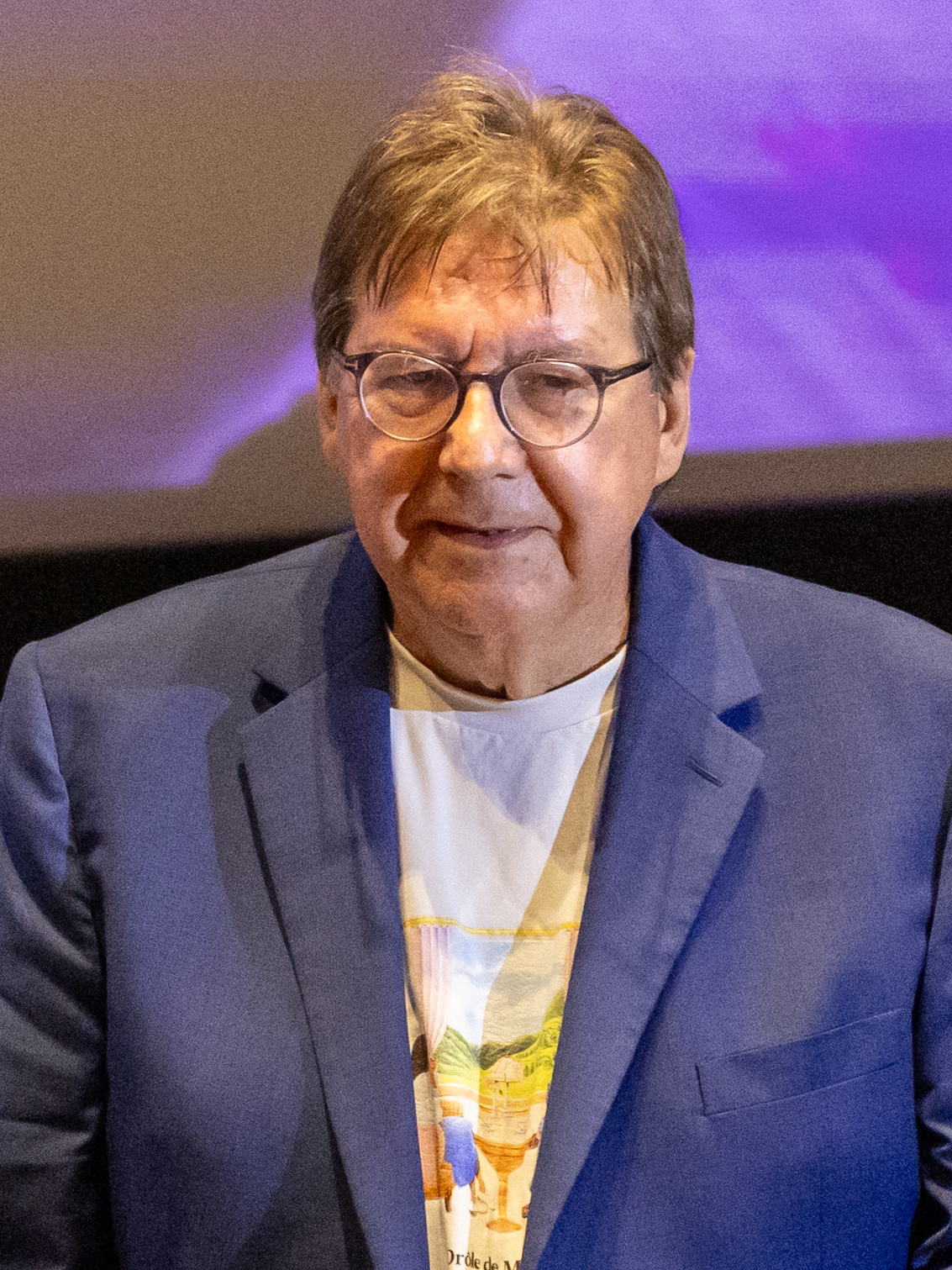
- Rémy Girard (2024)
- Born: August 10, 1950 (age 76); Jonquière, Quebec, Canada

Rémy Girard OC (born August 10, 1950) is a Canadian actor and former television host from Quebec.

== Early life ==
Born in Jonquière, he is the son of politician Fernand Girard.

He attended Université Laval, initially to study law but switching to acting after joining the university's theatre troupe. He transferred to the Conservatoire de théàtre du Québec, where he graduated in 1974.

== Acting career ==
Girard has acted in film, television and stage productions throughout his career. He first became famous for playing the role of Rémy in Denys Arcand's 1986 film The Decline of the American Empire (Le Déclin de l'empire américain), later reprising the character in The Barbarian Invasions (Les Invasions barbares). Girard also appeared in Arcand's films Jesus of Montreal (Jésus de Montréal) and Testament.

He was Paul Bougon in the TV series Les Bougon, which ran for three seasons on TV in Canada from 2003 to 2005. He hosted a game show called La Chasse aux Trésors that aired on Quebec television network TVA during the late 1990s, and starred in the 2011 Canadian action comedy InSecurity on CBC Television.

In 2006 he was a member of the jury at the 28th Moscow International Film Festival.

Girard played notorious criminal Lucien Rivard in The American Trap (Le piege americain). Girard starred as Hervé Mercure in the thriller 7 Days (Les 7 Jours du Talion), directed by Daniel Grou.

== Filmography ==
Year	Title	Role	Notes
1973	The Conquest (La Conquête)	Customer in restaurant	
1982	Red Eyes (Les Yeux rouges)	Henri-Paul	
1984	The Crime of Ovide Plouffe (Le Crime d'Ovide Plouffe)	Radio announcer	
1986	The Decline of the American Empire (Le Déclin de l'empire américain)	Rémy, Louise's husband	
1988	The Revolving Doors (Les Portes tournantes)	Monsieur Litwin	
1988	Kalamazoo	Félix Cotnoir	
1988	The Mills of Power (Les Tisserands du pouvoir)		
1989	Jesus of Montreal (Jésus de Montréal)	Martin	
1991	Montreal Stories (Montréal vu par...)	Consul	
1993	La Florida	Léo Lespérance	
1994	Million Dollar Babies	Martin Poulin	
1994	Jerome's Secret (Le Secret de Jérôme)	Cyrille Marquis	
1996	Lilies (Les Feluettes)	the inmate playing the baroness	
1996	The Ideal Man (L'Homme idéal)	Bob	
1997	Les Boys	Stan	
1997	The Seat of the Soul (Le siège de l'âme)	The Detective	
1998	The Red Violin (Le Violon rouge)	the customs officer	
1998	Free Money	Louis	
2001	Varian's War	Colonel Joubert	
2002	Séraphin: Heart of Stone	Father Laloge	
2003	The Barbarian Invasions (Les Invasions barbares)	Rémy	
2004	Machine Gun Molly (Monica la mitraille)	Maurice Morissette	
2005	Aurore	Oreus Mailhot	
2005	The Rocket (Maurice Richard)	Tony Bergeron	
2005	Human Trafficking	Viktor Taganov	
2006	Le Lièvre de Vatanen	Richard Growe	
2007	Blades of Glory	Father St. Pierre	
2007	Bluff	Georges	
2008	The American Trap (Le piège américain)	Lucien Rivard	
2008	Honey, I'm in Love (Le Grand départ)	Henri Leduc	
2009	A Happy Man (Le Bonheur de Pierre)	Michel Dolbec	
2009	Father and Guns (De père en flic)	Charles Bérubé	
2009	Je me souviens	Monseigneur Madore	
2010	Incendies	Jean Lebel, the barrister	
2010	The Comeback (Cabotins)	Marcel Lajoie	
2016	Boundaries (Pays)	Paul Rivest	
2016	Votez Bougon	Paul Bougon	
2016	Murdoch Mysteries	Joseph-Elzéar Bernier	episode 10 of season 9: The Big Chill
2018	The Fall of the American Empire (La Chute de l'empire américain)	Sylvain 'The Brain' Bigras	
2019	And the Birds Rained Down (Il pleuvait des oiseaux)		
2020	The Vinland Club (Le Club Vinland)		
2020	You Will Remember Me (Tu te souviendras de moi)	Édouard	
2021	Portrait-Robot or The Sketch Artist	Bernard Dupin	
2022	Bones of Crows	Father Jacobs	
2023	Testament	Jean-Michel	
2024	Ababooned (Ababouiné)	Cardinal Madore	
2025	Compulsive Liar 2 (Menteuse)	Serge Gauthier	
2026	125, rue des Malaises	Laurent Perrier	

== Awards ==
In June 2019 Girard was appointed an Officer of the Order of Canada.

In 2023 he was the recipient of the Prix Iris Tribute Award, the lifetime achievement award of Québec Cinéma, at the 25th Quebec Cinema Awards. He had previously received two Best Actor and five Best Supporting Actor nominations, but had never won a competitive award, making him the actor with the most nominations without a win.

In 2024 he was named the winner of the Prix Denise-Pelletier for his body of work.

Award	Date of ceremony	Category	Film	Result	Ref(s)
Genie Awards	1987	Best Actor	The Decline of the American Empire (Le Déclin de l'empire américain)	Nominated	
Genie Awards	1991	Best Actor	Love Crazy (Amoureux fou)	Won	
Genie Awards	1993	Best Actor	La Florida	Nominated	
Genie Awards	1998	Best Actor	Les Boys	Nominated	
Genie Awards	2003	Best Actor	The Barbarian Invasions (Les Invasions barbares)	Won	
Genie Awards	1989	Best Supporting Actor	The Revolving Doors (Les Portes tournantes)	Won	
Genie Awards	1990	Best Supporting Actor	Jesus of Montreal (Jésus de Montréal)	Won	
Genie Awards	2005	Best Supporting Actor	Aurore	Nominated	
Genie Awards	2009	Best Supporting Actor	Father and Guns (De père en flic)	Nominated	
Canadian Screen Awards	2020	Best Supporting Actor	And the Birds Rained Down (Il pleuvait des oiseaux)	Won	
Prix Jutra/Iris	2002	Best Actor	Les Boys III	Nominated	
Prix Jutra/Iris	2004	Best Actor	The Barbarian Invasions (Les invasions barbares)	Nominated	
Prix Jutra/Iris	1999	Best Supporting Actor	Les Boys II	Nominated	
Prix Jutra/Iris	2003	Best Supporting Actor	Séraphin: Heart of Stone (Séraphin: Un homme et son péché)	Nominated	
Prix Jutra/Iris	2010	Best Supporting Actor	Father and Guns (De père en flic)	Nominated	
Prix Jutra/Iris	2020	Best Supporting Actor	And the Birds Rained Down (Il pleuvait des oiseaux)	Nominated	
Prix Jutra/Iris	2021	Best Supporting Actor	The Vinland Club (Le club Vinland)	Nominated	
Prix Jutra/Iris	2023	Tribute Award		Won	
