= Route 132 (film) =

- Directed by: Louis Bélanger
- Written by: Louis Bélanger; Alexis Martin
- Produced by: Fabienne Larouche; Daniel Louis; Denise Robert; Michel Trudeau
- Starring: François Papineau; Alexis Martin; Sophie Bourgeois; Andrée Lachapelle; Alice Morel-Michaud
- Cinematography: Pierre Mignot
- Edited by: Claude Palardy
- Music by: Benoît Charest
- Production company: Cinémaginaire
- Distributed by: Alliance Vivafilm
- Release date: 2010
- Running time: 113 minutes
- Country: Canada
- Language: French

Route 132 is a 2010 Canadian drama film from Quebec. Directed by Louis Bélanger and written by Bélanger and Alexis Martin, the film stars Martin and François Papineau as Bob and Gilles, two men who embark on a road trip and crime spree along Quebec Route 132 following the death of Gilles' son.

The film garnered three Genie Award nominations at the 31st Genie Awards, including Best Actor for Papineau, Best Supporting Actor for Martin and Best Original Screenplay for Bélanger and Martin.
