= Gérard Poirier =

Canadian actor and director (1930–2021)

- Born: 4 February 1930; Montreal, Quebec, Canada
- Died: 19 December 2021 (aged 91); Montreal, Quebec, Canada
- Occupations: Actor; Director

Gérard Poirier OC OQ (4 February 1930 – 19 December 2021) was a Canadian actor and director.

== Life and career ==
Born in Montreal in 1930, Poirier began acting in the theatre at the age of 12. He graduated from the Collège André-Grasset in 1952 and subsequently became a teacher at the Conservatoire d'art dramatique de Montréal, the Collège Lionel-Groulx, and the Collège Antoine-Girouard. His early acting career was in the theatre, particularly at the Théâtre du Rideau Vert and the Théâtre du Nouveau Monde. His archives are kept in the Bibliothèque et Archives nationales du Québec.

Poirier died in Montreal on 19 December 2021, at the age of 91.

== Filmography ==
=== Film ===
- The Rebels (Quelques arpents de neige) - 1972
- Les Beaux Dimanches - 1974
- Panic (Panique) - 1977
- The Plouffe Family (Les Plouffe) - 1981
- Catherine Courage - 1993
- Matusalem - 1993
- Meanwhile (Pendant ce temps...) - 1998
- Wedding Night (Nuit de noces) - 2001
- Stay with Me (Reste avec moi) - 2010
- Henry - 2011

=== Television ===
- Dateline (1955–1956)
- Beau temps, mauvais temps (1955–1958)
- Radisson (1957–1959)
- D'Iberville (1967–1968)
- Nic and Pic (1973)
- He Shoots, He Scores (1989)
- Un gars, une fille (1997)

== Awards ==
- Prix Gémeaux for Best Male Lead in a Drama or Comedy (1988)
- Officer of the Order of Canada (1996)
- Prix Gascon-Roux (1997)
- Prix Gémeaux for best Male Supporting Role in a Soap Opera (2002)
- Knight of the Order of La Pléiade (2006)
- Officer of the National Order of Quebec (2007)
