= The Last Escape (2010 film) =

- Film Poster
- French: La Dernière Fugue
- Directed by: Léa Pool
- Written by: Gil Courtemanche; Léa Pool
- Produced by: Lyse Lafontaine; Nicolas Stei
- Starring: Yves Jacques; Jacques Godin; Andrée Lachapelle; Aliocha Schneider; Marie-France Lambert
- Cinematography: Pierre Mignot
- Edited by: Michel Arcand
- Music by: André Dziezuk; Marc Mergen
- Production companies: Equinoxe Productions; Iris Productions
- Distributed by: Filmcoopi Zürich (Switzerland); Seville Pictures (Canada)
- Release date: 26 February 2010 (Canada)
- Running time: 92 minutes
- Countries: Luxembourg; Canada
- Language: French

The Last Escape (French: La dernière fugue) is a 2010 French-language Canadian drama film, directed by Léa Pool and written by Pool and Gil Courtemanche based on the novel A Beautiful Death (2005). This film stars Yves Jacques, Jacques Godin, Andrée Lachapelle and Aliocha Schneider and was theatrical released at Canada on February 2, 2010.

== Plot ==
During a family Christmas dinner, the Lévesque family meets in order to spend quality time together. However, a major topic of conversation spoils the festive atmosphere: the health of the father of this family (Jacques Godin), who is diagnosed with Parkinson's disease. In addition, the quality of life is more than anything but fair at that time, as the family often quarrels. His eldest son André (Yves Jacques) and André's son Sam (Aliocha Schneider) want to end his suffering by making him live his last moments in happiness. However, the rest of the family does not agree to this, believing that their father should live as long as possible. One thing is certain, is that this father and his wife (Andrée Lachapelle) will not separate under any circumstances.

== Cast ==
- Yves Jacques as André
- Jacques Godin as Le Père
- Andrée Lachapelle as La Mère
- Aliocha Schneider as Sam
- Nicole Max as Isabelle
- Marie-France Lambert as Géraldine
- Martine Francke as Julie
- Benoît Gouin as Bernard
- Isabelle Miquelon as Mireille
- Patrick Hastert as Jean-Maurice
- Joël Delsaut as Pierre
- Noa Kate as Amandine
- Camille Felton as Emma
- Mathias Urbain as Jules
- Félicien Schiltz as Xavier Jr
- Alex Kate as Louis
- Léa Rollauer as Béatrice
- Alexandre Goyette as Le Père (1968)
- Marie-Christine Labelle as La Mère (1968)
- Jules St-Jean as André (1968)
- Simone-Élise Girard as Physiotherapist
- Éliana Chrétien as Julie (1968)
- Thomas Trudel as Bernard (1968)
- Charlotte Comeau as Mireille (1968)
- Jade Charbonneau as Géraldine

== Reception ==
=== Critical response ===
Boyd van Hoeij from Variety magazine wrote: "Though pic’s first half covers a Christmas dinner that introduces the extended, ennui-inducing Levesque clan, the unfocused narrative pivots around a single moment in the childhood of Andre (Jules St-Jean as a child, Denys Arcand regular Yves Jacques as an adult) that explains the hatred toward his now-ailing, septuagenarian dad, Anatole (Godin). But numerous flashbacks — in shaky, overexposed Super 8 — reduce a potentially complex father-son relationship to a simplistic tit-for-tat. Like Godin, Andree Lachapelle, as Anatole’s wife, is outstanding, though her character’s final actions reek more of screenplay convenience than character conviction. Violin- and piano-driven score doesn’t dare wander off the beaten path; other craft contributions also march in line."

=== Awards and nominations ===
Shanghai International Film Festival
- Golden Goblet Award for Best Feature Film – Léa Pool (nominated)

Jutra Award

- Best Actor (Meilleur Acteur) – Jacques Godin (nominated)
- Best Editing (Meilleur Montage Image) – Michel Arcand (nominated)
- Best Supporting Actor (Meilleur Acteur de Soutien) – Yves Jacques (nominated)
- Best Supporting Actress (Meilleure Actrice de Soutien) – Isabelle Miquelon (nominated)
