= Jean Lapointe =

Canadian politician (1935–2022)

The Honourable Jean Lapointe OC OQ

Senator from Quebec (Sorel)
- In office June 13, 2001 – December 6, 2010
- Preceded by: Fernand Roberge
- Succeeded by: Larry Smith

Personal details
- Born: December 6, 1935 Price, Quebec, Canada
- Died: November 18, 2022 (aged 86) Montreal, Quebec, Canada
- Party: Liberal
- Profession: Actor, comedian, singer

Jean Lapointe, OC OQ (December 6, 1935 – November 18, 2022) was a Canadian actor, comedian and singer, as well as a Canadian Senator.

Lapointe began his stage career as part of the duo Les Jérolas with Jérôme Lemay, performing in such venues as The Ed Sullivan Show and at the Olympia in Paris.

He launched his solo career in 1974 and performed on stage, albums and in two feature films. Most of his albums were produced by Yves Lapierre.

He was also a social activist who campaigned against alcoholism and drug abuse through his Jean Lapointe Foundation. Named an Officer of the Order of Canada in 1984, he was appointed to the Senate by Jean Chrétien in 2001, where he served as a Liberal until reaching the mandatory retirement age of 75 on December 6, 2010. In 2006, he was appointed an Officer of the National Order of Quebec.

Lapointe was also a life member of the Royal Philatelic Society of Canada and a member of the Stamp Advisory Committee of Canada Post.

In 2005, Lapointe was the recipient of the Lifetime Achievement Award at the Francophone SOCAN Awards held in Montreal.

Lapointe died on November 18, 2022, at the age of 86.

== Thoroughbred racing ==
Jean Lapointe owned the sprinter Diapason whose wins included the 1984 Nearctic Stakes and who was voted the Sovereign Award as that year's Canadian Champion Sprint Horse.

== Filmography ==
Year	Title	Role	Notes
1970	Two Women in Gold (Deux femmes en or)	Det. Poivrot	
1971	The Master Cats (Les Chats bottés)		
1973	O.K. ... Laliberté	Louis	
1974	Once Upon a Time in the East (Il était une fois dans l'est)		
1974	The Apple, the Stem and the Seeds (La pomme, la queue et les pépins)		
1974	Orders (Les Ordres)	Clermont Boudreau	
1975	A Woman Inflamed (Tout feu, tout femme)	François Chartrand	
1975	The Winner		
1976	A Pacemaker and a Sidecar (L'Eau chaud, l'eau frette)	Polo	
1977	Bernie and the Gang (Ti-Mine, Bernie pis la gang)	Bernie	
1977	J.A. Martin Photographer (J.A. Martin photographe)	Adhémar	
1977	One Man	Ben Legault	Winner for Best Supporting Actor at the 28th Canadian Film Awards
1977	Angela	M. Lebrecque	
1978	Duplessis	Maurice Duplessis	TV miniseries, 7 episodes
1980	Hot Dogs (Les chiens chauds)	Lawyer	
1990	Ding et Dong	Euclide	
1990	An Imaginary Tale (Une histoire inventée)	Gaston	
1992	The Saracen Woman (La Sarrasine)	Alphonse Lamoureux	
1992	Montréal ville ouverte	Judge Caron	TV miniseries, 13 episodes
1994	René Lévesque	Clochard	TV series
1996	Never Too Late	Woody	
1998	Bouscotte	Magloire St-Jean	TV series
2000	The Bottle (La bouteille)	Antoine	
2001	A Girl at the Window (Une jeune fille à la fenêtre)	Taxi driver	
2003	Un gars, une fille	Jean, uncle of Sylvie	TV series, 2 episodes
2003	Les Immortels	Adélard Major	
2003	Clearing Skies (Une éclaircie sur le fleuve)	The Father	Short film
2004	Looking for Alexander (Mémoires affectives)	Wilbrod Gadouas	
2004	Lance et compte: La reconquête	Himself	TV series, 1 episode
2004	The Last Tunnel (Le dernier tunnel)	Fred Giguère	Winner for Best Supporting Actor at the 25th Genie Awards
2008	Truffles (Truffe)		
2009	The Canadiens, Forever (Pour toujours, les Canadiens!)	Gerry Thibodeau	
2010	Crying Out (À l'origine d'un cri)	Grandfather	
2010	Snow & Ashes	Thomas	
2014	Les beaux malaises	Marcel Coiteau	TV series, 2 episodes
2020	My Very Own Circus (Mon cirque à moi)	Guédille	
