= Alexis Martin (actor) =

Canadian actor and writer (born 1964)

Alexis Martin (born June 9, 1964) is a Canadian actor and writer. A 1986 graduate of the Conservatoire d'art dramatique de Montréal, he has acted in film, television and stage productions, and has written both theatrical plays and film screenplays.

He was a Genie Award nominee for Best Supporting Actor at the 31st Genie Awards in 2010 for Route 132, and for Best Adapted Screenplay at the 20th Genie Awards in 1999 for Matroni et moi. His play Bureaux was shortlisted for the Governor General's Award for French-language drama at the 2004 Governor General's Awards.

He is the uncle of Béatrice Martin, a singer-songwriter known by the stage name Cœur de pirate.

== Filmography ==
=== Film ===
- Cordélia - 1980
- The Party (Le Party) - 1990
- Cosmos - 1996
- Karmina - 1996
- The Revenge of the Woman in Black (La vengeance de la femme en noir) - 1997
- Nô - 1998
- August 32nd on Earth (Un 32 août sur terre) - 1998
- Matroni and Me (Matroni et moi) - 1999
- Les Boys III - 2001
- The Collector (Le Collectionneur) - 2002
- CQ2 (Seek You Too) - 2004
- Audition (L'Audition) - 2005
- Saint Martyrs of the Damned (Saints-Martyrs-des-Damnés) - 2005
- A Sunday in Kigali (Un dimanche à Kigali) - 2006
- Bluff - 2007
- Le Banquet - 2008
- Babine - 2008
- Route 132 - 2010
- Before My Heart Falls (Avant que mon cœur bascule) - 2012
- My Internship in Canada (Guibord s'en va-t-en guerre) - 2015
- Bad Seeds (Les mauvaises herbes) - 2016
- 9 (9, le film) - 2016
- Hochelaga, Land of Souls (Hochelaga, Terre des âmes) - 2017
- We Are Gold (Nous sommes Gold) - 2019
- There Are No False Undertakings (Il n'y a pas de faux métier) - 2020
- Vile & Miserable (Vil & Misérable) - 2024

=== Television ===
- L'Amour avec un Grand A
- Radio Enfer
- Sous le signe du lion
- Fortier
- Trauma
- Les Parent

== Plays ==
- Oreille, tigre et bruit
- Matroni et moi
- L'An de Grâce
- Bureaux
- L'Apprentissage des marais
- Révolutions
