= 1st Jutra Awards =

1999 Canadian film awards ceremony

The 1st Jutra Awards were held on March 7, 1999 to honour films made with the participation of the Quebec film industry in 1998. The host of the ceremony was Rémy Girard.

The Red Violin (Le violon rouge) garnered the most nominations with eleven, and the most wins with nine including Best Film, Best Director, Best Screenplay and Best Supporting Actor for Colm Feore.

August 32nd on Earth (Un 32 août sur terre) received seven nominations and won Best Actor for Alexis Martin. 2 Seconds (2 secondes) also received seven nominations, including the "Big Five": Best Film, Best Director for Manon Briand, who became the first woman nominated in that category, Best Actor for Dino Tavarone, Best Actress for Charlotte Laurier and Best Screenplay.

Streetheart (Le cœur au poing) became the first film to receive two acting awards, namely Best Actress for Pascale Montpetit and Best Supporting Actress for Anne-Marie Cadieux.

== Winners and nominees ==
Best Film	Best Director
The Red Violin (Le violon rouge) — Niv Fichman; 2 Seconds (2 secondes) — Roger Frappier; August 32nd on Earth (Un 32 août sur terre) - Roger Frappier; Nô — Bruno Jobin	François Girard, The Red Violin (Le violon rouge); Manon Briand, 2 Seconds (2 secondes); Robert Lepage, Nô; Denis Villeneuve, August 32nd on Earth (Un 32 août sur terre)
Best Actor	Best Actress
Alexis Martin, August 32nd on Earth (Un 32 août sur terre); Marc Messier, Les Boys II; Marcel Sabourin, Now or Never (Aujourd'hui ou jamais); Dino Tavarone, 2 Seconds (2 secondes)	Pascale Montpetit, Streetheart (Le cœur au poing); Sylvia Chang, The Red Violin (Le violon rouge); Charlotte Laurier, 2 Seconds (2 secondes); Ginette Reno, It's Your Turn, Laura Cadieux (C't'à ton tour, Laura Cadieux)
Best Supporting Actor	Best Supporting Actress
Colm Feore, The Red Violin (Le violon rouge); Claude Blanchard, Now or Never (Aujourd'hui ou jamais); Denis Bouchard, It's Your Turn, Laura Cadieux (C't'à ton tour, Laura Cadieux); Rémy Girard, Les Boys II	Anne-Marie Cadieux, Streetheart (Le cœur au poing); Micheline Lanctôt, Now or Never (Aujourd'hui ou jamais); Monique Mercure, The Red Violin (Le violon rouge); Sonia Vachon, It's Your Turn, Laura Cadieux (C't'à ton tour, Laura Cadieux)
Best Screenplay	Best Cinematography
François Girard and Don McKellar, The Red Violin (Le violon rouge); Manon Briand, 2 Seconds (2 secondes); Robert Lepage and André Morency, Nô; Denis Villeneuve, August 32nd on Earth (Un 32 août sur terre)	Alain Dostie, The Red Violin (Le violon rouge); Pierre Letarte, When I Will Be Gone (L'âge de braise); Pierre Mignot, Nô; André Turpin, August 32nd on Earth (Un 32 août sur terre)
Best Art Direction	Best Sound
François Séguin and Renée April, The Red Violin (Le violon rouge); Stéphane Roy, Daniel Hamelin and Helen Rainbird, It's Your Turn, Laura Cadieux (C't'à ton tour, Laura Cadieux); Stéphane Roy and Nicoletta Massone, Kayla; Monique Dion, C. Jacques and Jean Le Bourdais, Nô	Claude La Haye, Marcel Pothier, Hans Peter Strobl and Guy Pelletier, The Red Violin (Le violon rouge); Yvon Benoît, Martin Pinsonnault, Hans Peter Strobl and Louis Hone, 2 Seconds (2 secondes); Serge Beauchemin, Viateur Paiement and Louis Gignac, It's Your Turn, Laura Cadieux (C't'à ton tour, Laura Cadieux); Michel Charron, Claude Beaugrand and Hans Peter Strobl, Streetheart (Le cœur au poing)
Best Editing	Best Original Music
Gaétan Huot, The Red Violin (Le violon rouge); Richard Comeau, 2 Seconds (2 secondes); Aube Foglia, Nô; Sophie Leblond, August 32nd on Earth (Un 32 août sur terre)	John Corigliano, The Red Violin (Le violon rouge); Pierre Desrochers and Nathalie Boileau, August 32nd on Earth (Un 32 août sur terre); François Dompierre, It's Your Turn, Laura Cadieux (C't'à ton tour, Laura Cadieux); Richard Grégoire and Y. Desrosiers, Streetheart (Le cœur au poing)
Best Documentary	Best Short Film
Richard Desjardins and Robert Monderie, Forest Alert (L'erreur boréale); Richard Lavoie, Charles Daudelin (Charles Daudelin, des mains et des mots); Lucie Ouimet and Catherine Larivain, Dans la gueule du crocodile; Georges Dufaux, Voyage illusoire	Jean-Marc Vallée, Magical Words (Les mots magiques); Gaëlle d'Ynglemare, Pas de deux sur chanson triste; Ghyslaine Côté, Meanwhile (Pendant ce temps...); Carole Ducharme, Straight from the Suburbs
Special Awards
Jutra Hommage: Marcel Sabourin; Billet d'or: Les Boys

== Multiple wins and nominations ==
=== Films with multiple nominations ===
Nominations	Film
11	The Red Violin (Le violon rouge)
7	2 Seconds (2 secondes)
7	August 32nd on Earth (Un 32 août sur terre)
6	It's Your Turn, Laura Cadieux (C't'à ton tour, Laura Cadieux)
6	Nô
4	Streetheart (Le cœur au poing)
3	Now or Never (Aujourd'hui ou jamais)
2	Les Boys II

=== Films with multiple wins ===
Wins	Film
9	The Red Violin (Le violon rouge)
2	Streetheart (Le cœur au poing)
