= Anne-Marie Gélinas =

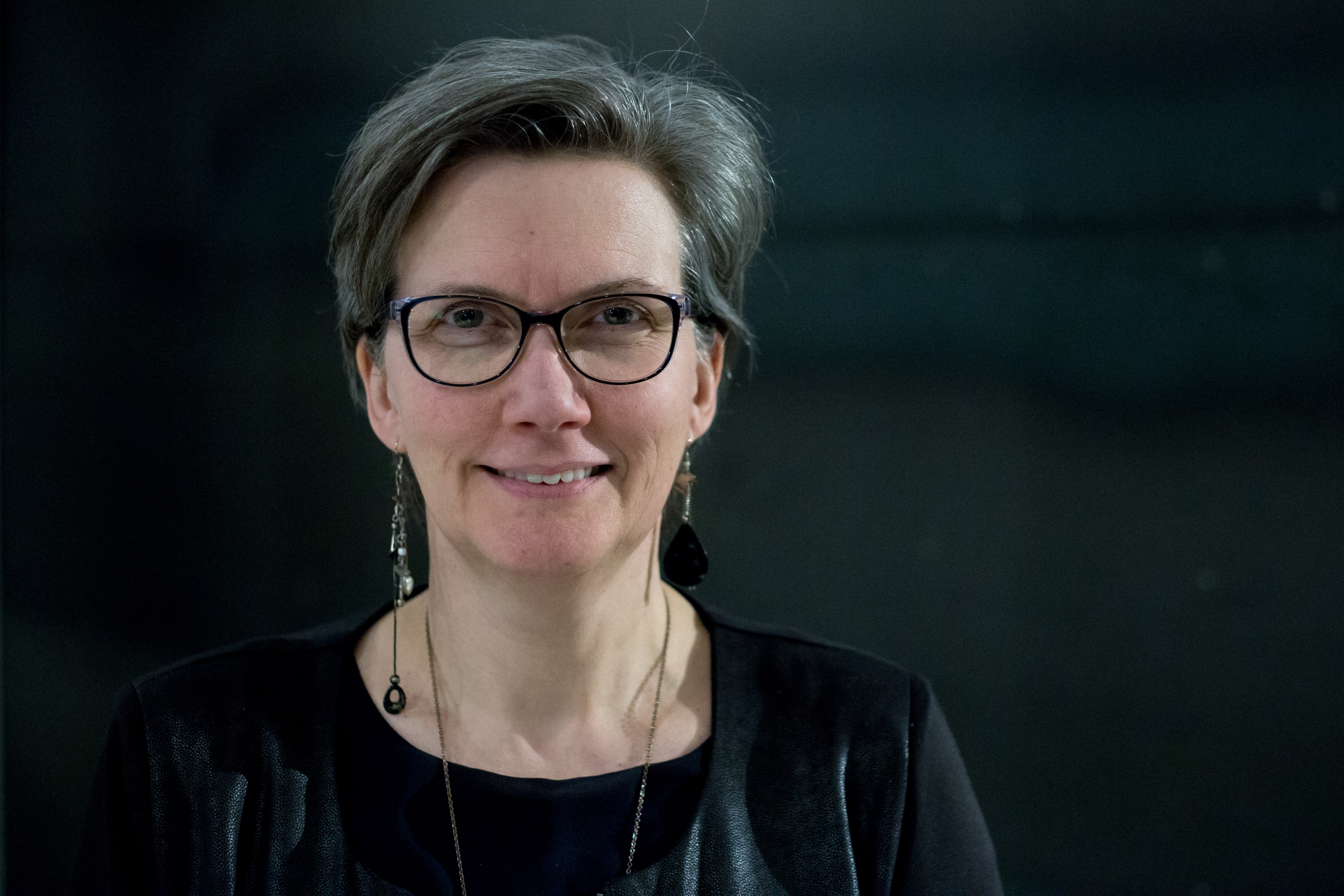
- Gélinas in 2019
- Born: 18 June 1964 (age 61); Montreal, Quebec, Canada
- Occupation: Producer

Anne-Marie Gélinas (born June 18, 1964) is a Montreal-based film, documentary and television producer. She is the president and CEO of EMAfilms, a production company that she founded in 2008.

== Life and career ==
After obtaining her B.A. in Communication Studies from Concordia University, Gélinas co-founded Productions Jeux d'Ombres in 1990 along with her husband Andrew Noble, and went on to produce critically acclaimed features such as André Turpin's Zigrail; Eugene Garcia's Burnt Eden, which won 'Best Canadian Independent Film' at the Montreal International Festival of New Cinema and New Media in 1997; and Méchant Party, starring Roc LaFortune and David La Haye.

Gélinas' other features include Simon Lacombe's Ne dis rien; John l'Écuyer's Le Goût des jeunes filles (based on the novel by Dany Laferrière), starring Luck Mervil and Dan Bigras; John Hazlett's These Girls, starring David Boreanaz and Caroline Dhavernas; and Hassan Benjelloun's Où vas-tu Moshé ?. She was executive producer on The Bend and the short films Big Money and Avant-goût de printemps.

Anne-Marie Gélinas also produced the documentaries Oh Mother!, Change From Within and Le doigt dans l'œil, which won the Best Film and Public Choice awards at the Festival de Films de Portneuf sur l'environnement. Her television work includes the series Hakuna Matata and De Dakar à Bandiagara for Quebec's specialty television channel, Évasion.

More recently, she worked as line producer on Kim Nguyen's War Witch (Rebelle), which received the Silver Bear Award for Best Actress at Berlinale 2012, Best Film and Best Actress awards at Tribeca 2012 and a 2013 Oscar nomination for Best Foreign Language Film.

Anne-Marie co-produced the film A Bottle in the Gaza Sea and produced Martin Villeneuve's Mars et Avril, starring Jacques Languirand, Caroline Dhavernas, Paul Ahmarani and Robert Lepage.

In 2015, she produced Turbo Kid, a co-production between Canada and New Zealand that had its world premiere at the Sundance Film Festival. Turbo Kid is directed by François Simard, Anouk Whissell and Yoann-Karl Whissell.

Three of her productions were released in 2017. Radius, a science-fiction thriller directed by Caroline Labrèche and Steeve Léonard and starring Diego Klattenhoff, which premiered during the Fantasia Film Festival; FISK - Untitled Portrait, a short documentary about artist William Fisk directed by Alejandro Alvarez Cadilla that premiered as part of the Palm Springs International Shortfest and Like a Pebble in the Boot, a documentary by Hélène Choquette that premiered at the Vancouver International Film Festival.

She has completed an Advanced Graduate Diploma in Management of Cultural Organizations from HEC Montréal. She is a member of the Association des producteurs de film et de télévision du Québec (APFTQ) and she holds a seat on the Board of Directors of Women in Film and Television – Montreal (WIFTM). Anne-Marie has been a member of Montreal's Cinéma Parallèle since 1996, and in 1997 and 2007 she headed the organization of the events surrounding the institution's 30th and 40th anniversaries.

== Selected filmography ==
- Zigrail (1995)
- Burnt Eden (1997)
- Oh Mother! (1998, documentary)
- Méchant Party (2000)
- Ne dis rien (2001)
- Des enfants de trop… (2001, short)
- Change From Within (2003, documentary)
- On the Verge of a Fever (Le Goût des jeunes filles) - 2004
- Big Money (2005, short)
- These Girls (2005)
- Où vas-tu Moshé ? (2007)
- Hakuna Matata (2007, TV Series)
- Le doigt dans l'œil (2007, documentary)
- Avant-goût de printemps (2008, short)
- The Bend (2009)
- A Flesh Offering (2010)
- De Dakar à Bandiagara (2010, TV Series)
- A Bottle in the Gaza Sea (2011)
- War Witch (2012)
- Mars et Avril (2012)
- Turbo Kid (2015)
- A Dog's Life (2015, documentary)
- Night Song (2016)
- Sun at Midnight (2016)
- Radius (2017)
- Like a Pebble in the Boot (2017, documentary)
- FISK (2017, documentary short)
- Third Wedding (Troisièmes noces) - 2018
- Paradise (2026)
