= Yves Jacques =

Canadian film, television and stage actor

Yves Jacques OC
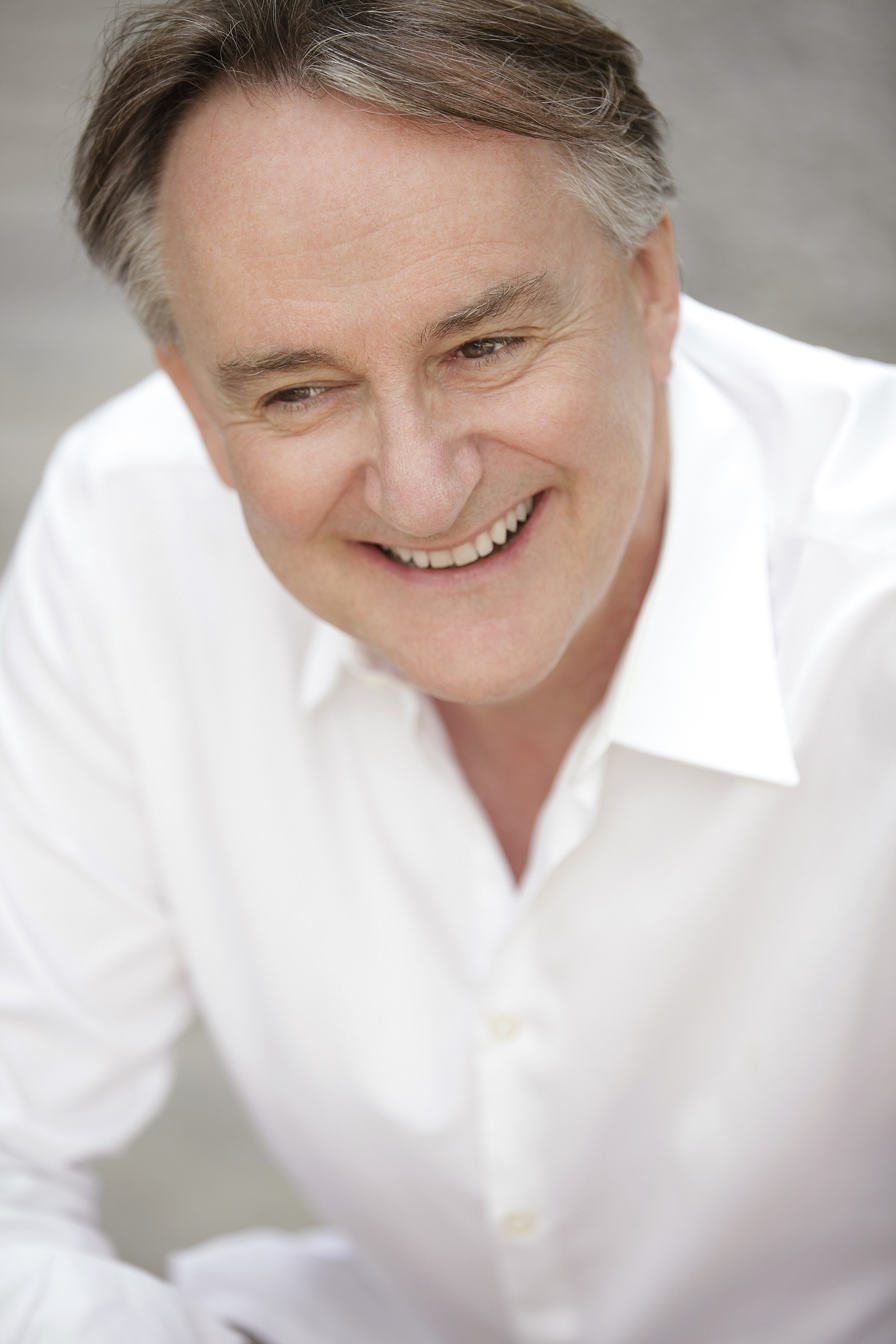
- Born: 10 May 1956 (age 70); Quebec City, Quebec, Canada
- Occupation: Actor
- Years active: 1980–present

Yves Jacques OC (born 10 May 1956) is a Canadian film, television and stage actor.

== Life and career ==
Jacques was born in Quebec City in 1956. He studied theatre at the Cégep de Saint-Hyacinthe, and began acting on stage in both Quebec City and Montreal. He became more widely known to film and television audiences beginning in 1981 as a sketch performer in Télévision de Radio-Canada's annual Bye Bye New Year's Eve variety special, and soon began appearing more widely in film and television roles. To international audiences, he is best known as Claude, the gay academic in Denys Arcand's The Decline of the American Empire and The Barbarian Invasions. On stage, he is noted for originating the role of Lydie-Anne in the premiere of Michel Marc Bouchard's play Lilies.

He has been in several movies by French filmmaker Claude Miller, including Of Woman and Magic and Little Lili. His fame has continued to grow with films and theatrical productions in both France and Quebec. Since 2001, he has toured the world in two shows by Robert Lepage, Far Side of the Moon (La Face cachée de la lune) and Le Projet Andersen, where he played all the roles. Since 2018, he has appeared regularly in Mathieu Quesnel's theatrical creations. More recently, he played in Aline by Valérie Lemercier, in Maria by Alec Pronovost, and in Chloé Robichaud's Les jours heureux. In 2022, Yves Jacques played in Martin Villeneuve's The 12 Tasks of Imelda (Les 12 travaux d'Imelda), co-starring playwright Robert Lepage and actress-singer Ginette Reno.

He was named Chevalier de l'Ordre des Arts et des Lettres by the Ministère de la Culture et de la Communication de France in February 2001, and was appointed an Officer of the Order of Canada in 2009, for his performances in theatre, television and film, in Canada and abroad.

He is openly gay.

== Filmography ==
Cinema

- 1982 : Red Eyes (Les Yeux rouges)
- 1983 : Sonatine: Subway Station Janitor
- 1984 : The Crime of Ovide Plouffe (Le Crime d'Ovide Plouffe): Bob
- 1985 : Hold-Up: Otage 400 S
- 1986 : The Decline of the American Empire (Le Déclin de l'empire américain): Claude
- 1989 : Jesus of Montreal (Jésus de Montréal): Richard Cardinal
- 1990 : Ding et Dong (Ding et Dong: le film): Jigi
- 1990 : Milena: Max Brod
- 1991 : Montreal Stories (Montréal vu par...)
- 1993 : Trois femmes un amour
- 1994 : Meurtre en musique: Simon Claveau
- 1994 : Louis 19, King of the Airwaves (Louis 19, le roi des ondes): Michel Gobeil
- 1995 : Alfred: Georges Fehrenbach
- 1998 : Michael Kael contre la World News Company: Charles Robert
- 1998 : Class Trip: The Visitor
- 1999 : Memories Unlocked (Souvenirs intimes): Mortimer
- 1999 : The Widow of Saint-Pierre (La Veuve de Saint-Pierre): Le contre-amiral
- 2000 : Life After Love (La Vie après l'amour): Docteur Bilodeau
- 2001 : Wedding Night (Nuit de noces): Bernard
- 2001 : Alias Betty (Betty Fisher et autres histoires): René the Canadian
- 2002 : The Collector (Le Collectionneur): François Berger / Babette Brown
- 2002 : Séraphin: Heart of Stone (Séraphin: un homme et son péché): Notaire Le Potiron
- 2003 : The Barbarian Invasions (Les Invasions barbares): Claude
- 2003 : Little Lili (La Petite Lili): Serge
- 2004 : Ordo : Richard Féraud
- 2004 : The Aviator: Un serveur
- 2005 : The Girl from the Chartreuse (La Petite Chartreuse) : Baldi
- 2005 : Let's Be Friends (Je préfère qu'on reste amis...): Germain
- 2005 : Aurore: Curé Leduc
- 2005 : Twice Upon a Time (Désaccord parfait): Le docteur Trudeau
- 2006 : A Secret (Un secret): Georges
- 2007 : 48 Hours a Day (48 heures par jour): Arnaud
- 2009 : You'll Miss Me (Je vais te manquer)
- 2010 : The Comeback (Cabotins): Lady Moon
- 2010 : The Last Escape (La dernière fugue): André
- 2011 : French Immersion
- 2011 : See How They Dance (Voyez comme ils dansent)
- 2012 : Laurence Anyways
- 2013 : Me, Myself and Mum (Les Garçons et Guillaume, à table !)
- 2015 : Families (Belles Familles)
- 2017 : Father and Guns 2 (De père en flic 2)
- 2019 : Forgotten Flowers (Les fleurs oubliées) : Marie-Victorin Kirouac
- 2020 : Villa Caprice
- 2021 : Maria
- 2021 : Aline
- 2022 : The 12 Tasks of Imelda (Les 12 travaux d'Imelda) : Veterinarian
- 2023 : Testament
- 2023 : Days of Happiness (Les Jours heureux)
- 2023 : Katak: The Brave Beluga (Katak, le brave béluga)
- 2023 : The Successor (Le Successeur)
- 2024 : Sisters and Neighbors! (Nos belles-sœurs)

Short films

- 2001 : Via Crucis
- 2001 : Requiem contre un plafond
- 2007 : Silence ! on voudrait bien s'aimer
- 2015 : Maurice

Television

- 1980 : Boogie-woogie 47: Denis St-Cyr
- 1983 : Poivre et sel: Pierrot Séguin
- 1993 : La Voyageuse du soir: Arthur
- 1994 : Jalna
- 1994 : Baldipata
- 1995 : V'la l'cinéma ou le roman de Charles Pathé: René Lampin
- 1995 : Belle Époque: Augustin
- 1997 : Ces enfants d'ailleurs: Jan Pawlowski / Jean Aucoin
- 1997 : Bob Million: Bob Million
- 1998 : Changement de cap: Cariou
- 1999 : Three Seasons: Henry
- 1999 : La Chambre des magiciennes: D. Fish
- 1999 : La Soirée des Jutras: EmCee
- 2000 : La Soirée des Jutras: Host
- 2001 : Thérèse et Léon: Marcel Bouchard
- 2001 : L'Aîné des Ferchaux: Me Jacquin
- 2002 : Napoléon: Lucien
- 2004 : H_{2}O: Québec Premier Marcel Coté
- 2005 : L'État de Grace: Bertrand Saint-Amor
- 2006 : Mafiosa: Zamponi

== Distinctions ==
=== Nominations ===
- Nominated for the prix Jutra for best actor in 2000 for Souvenirs intimes

== Music ==
In 1981, he was singer-songwriter of the song On ne peut pas tous être pauvres (music by composer Pierre Gagnon). Jacques also produced and directed the music video, considered the first Québécois music video.
