= Mars & Avril =

2012 film by Martin Villeneuve

- Film poster (French)
- French: Mars et Avril
- Directed by: Martin Villeneuve
- Written by: Martin Villeneuve
- Produced by: Martin Villeneuve; Robert Lepage; Anne-Marie Gélinas; Benoît Beaulieu
- Starring: Jacques Languirand; Caroline Dhavernas; Paul Ahmarani; Robert Lepage
- Cinematography: Benoît Beaulieu
- Edited by: Mathieu Demers
- Music by: Benoît Charest
- Production companies: Mars et Avril Inc.; EMAFilms; Les Productions du 8e Art; Item 7
- Distributed by: Alliance Vivafilm (Canada); Gaiam (U.S.)
- Release dates: 2 July 2012 (KVFF); 15 September 2012 (AFF, Canada)
- Running time: 91 minutes
- Country: Canada
- Language: French
- Budget: $2.3 million

Mars & Avril (French: Mars et Avril) is a 2012 Canadian science fiction film starring Jacques Languirand, Caroline Dhavernas, Paul Ahmarani and Robert Lepage. The movie, based on the photo-novels of the same name published by Sid Lee & la Pastèque, is written, produced and directed by Martin Villeneuve.

The film was shot on a budget of C$2.3 million and featured numerous green screen effects. Belgian comic book artist François Schuiten is the production designer, former ILM Senior Compositor Carlos Monzon worked as VFX supervisor, and Benoît Charest composed the original score. The film was financed by Telefilm Canada, SODEC, Les Productions du 8e Art and the Harold Greenberg Fund, and is distributed in Canada by Alliance Vivafilm (now owned by eOne) and in the United States by Gaiam. The official trailer was released in Quebec theatres and on Alliance Vivafilm's YouTube channel on 21 December 2011.

The world premiere took place on 2 July 2012 at the 47th Karlovy Vary International Film Festival, Czech Republic (the film was selected in the section "Another View" for its unique artistic approach in both form and content). Since then, the film has been screened in twenty other major cinema events around the globe and has received 10 nominations. Martin Villeneuve was nominated for "Best Adapted Screenplay" at the 2013 Canadian Screen Awards, and he also won an "Imaging the Future Award" at the Neuchâtel International Fantasy Film Festival in Switzerland. In addition, Villeneuve gave a TED Talk about his film at TED2013 in Long Beach, California.

== Plot ==
In Montréal, in the near future, humanity is about to set foot on Mars. Jacob Obus (Jacques Languirand), a charismatic musician, takes pride in slowing down time by playing instruments inspired by women's bodies, designed by his friend, Arthur (Paul Ahmarani). A love triangle develops when Jacob and Arthur both fall in love with Avril (Caroline Dhavernas), a young photographer. Enter Eugène Spaak (Robert Lepage), inventor, cosmologist and Arthur's father, who unveils a new theory about man's desire to reach Mars and helps Jacob find the true meaning of life and love.

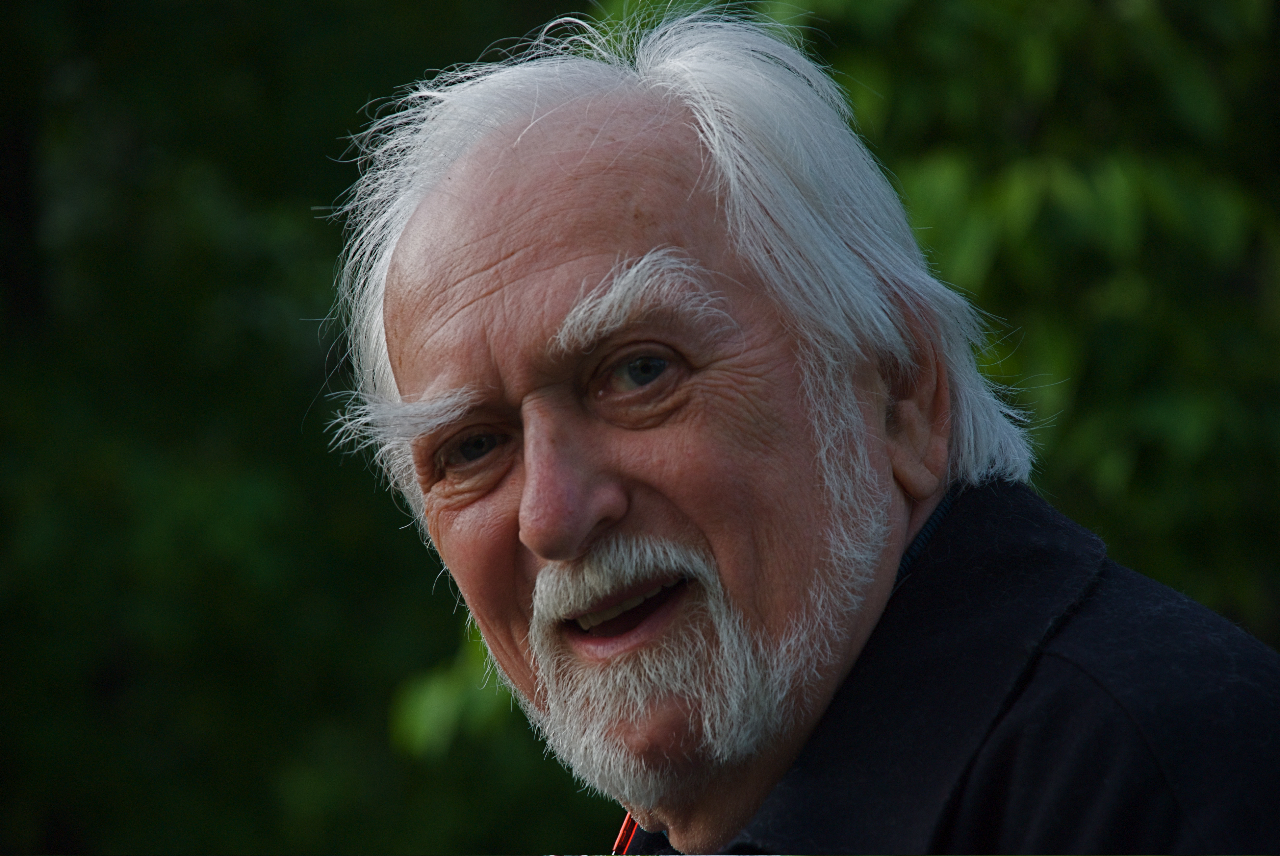
Jacques Languirand

== Cast ==
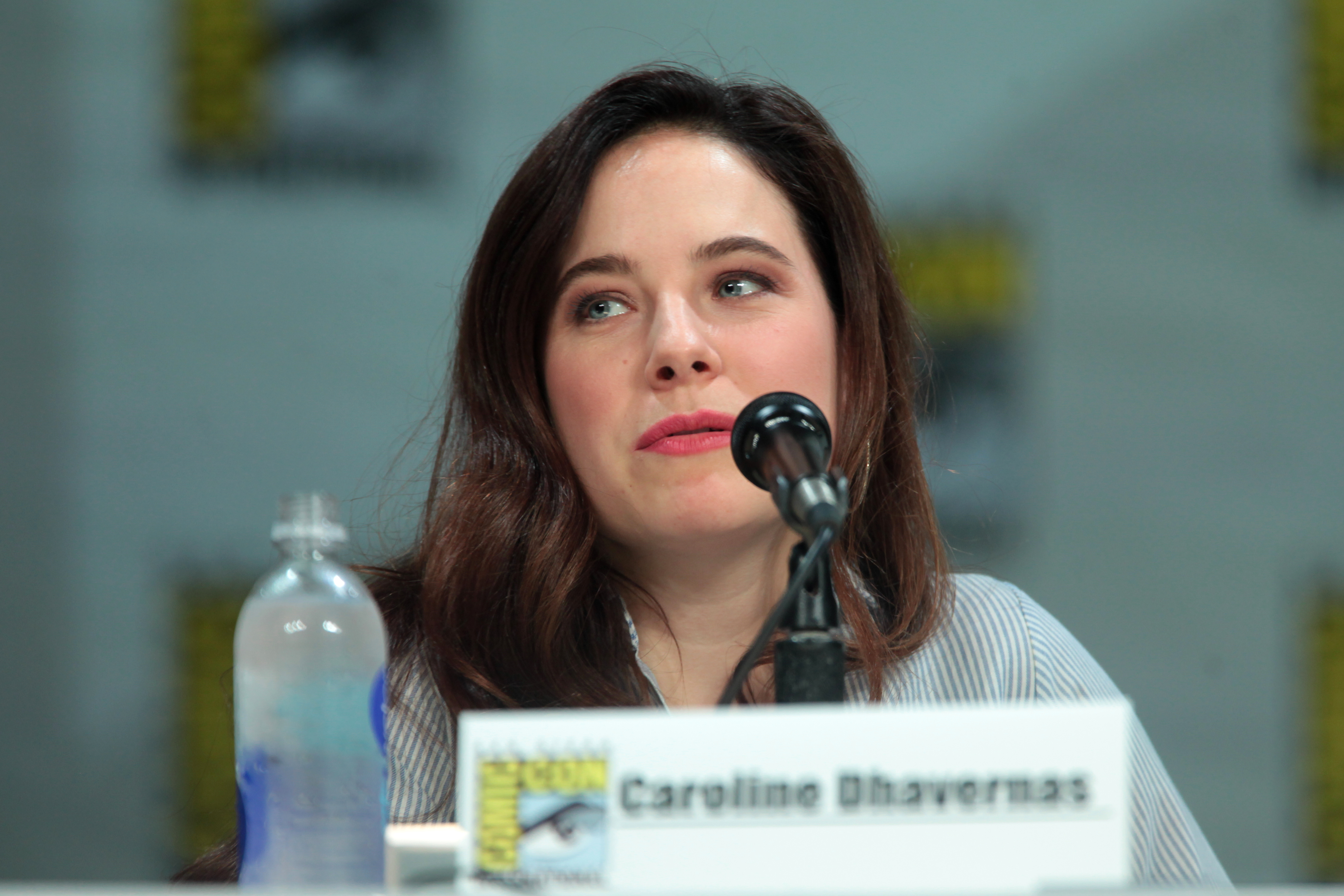
Caroline Dhavernas

- Jacques Languirand as Jacob Obus
- Caroline Dhavernas as Avril
- Paul Ahmarani as Arthur
- Robert Lepage as Eugène Spaak (head)
- Jean Asselin as Eugène Spaak (body) / Serveur automate
- Stéphane Demers as Bernard Brel
- Jean Marchand as the Pneumatologist
- Kathleen Fortin as Modèle d'Arthur
- Marcel Sabourin as Capucin
- André Montmorency as Pierrot
- Gabriel Gascon as Arlequin
- Emanuel Hoss-Desmarais as Marsonaute #1
- Pierre Leblanc as Marsonaute #2
- Richard Robitaille as Marsonaute #3
- Khanh Hua as Robot Bartender
- Michèle Deslauriers as Operator (voice)
- Denis Gravereaux as Cosmologist #1
- Charles Papasoff as Cosmologist #2
- Émilie Blake as the Pneumatologist's Secretary

== Production ==
=== Development ===
In 2005, Robert Lepage optioned the rights to Martin Villeneuve's Mars et Avril photo novels through his Quebec city-based motion picture company, Films Ex æquo (who had already produced The Far Side of the Moon in 2003), with the intent of adapting them into a science fiction feature film. While Villeneuve was to write the script, Lepage was attached to the project as producer and as an actor. A year later, Lepage shut down Films Ex æquo. Nevertheless, he strongly encouraged Villeneuve to produce and direct the film himself. Villeneuve took over the project, while Lepage remained involved as an actor and creative producer.

In 2008, SODEC, Telefilm Canada, The Harold Greenberg Fund and Alliance Vivafilm decided to finance the production.

Due to the film's significant amount of visual effects, an extensive year of pre-production was necessary. In pre-production, Schuiten made some sketches of the sets and, in post-production, he oversaw the visual coherence of the whole film while acting as art direction consultant. Since the film was to be shot almost entirely on green screen, in only 25 days and on a very tight budget of C$2.3 million, preparation was key to making it work. The 1200 shots were hand-drawn as storyboards and then edited with the dialogues in a detailed, two-hour-long animatic that mapped out every detail before shooting. Villeneuve went to Brussels in May 2008 to work with Schuiten, then Schuiten came to Montreal twice to follow up: in September 2008 and December 2011. Throughout filming and post-production, the two men touched base as often as they could through Skype. A brainstorming session between Villeneuve and Schuiten is available as the audio commentary on the DVD.

=== Design ===
In 2007, Villeneuve contacted famed Belgian comic book artist François Schuiten, who accepted the position of production designer. Schuiten had already worked on such films as Toto le Héros, The Golden Compass and Mr. Nobody. The filmmaker wanted the source of his inspiration to play a direct role in the creation of the film rather than try to mimic his style. For a scene taking place inside the Temple of Cosmologists, Schuiten agreed to have a 3D model made of the futuristic auditorium from Fever in Urbicand, a volume in his Les Cités Obscures series. Villeneuve had this image in mind when writing the photo novel. For the shooting of this scene, extras were chosen who looked like the characters from Schuiten's graphic novel.

Villeneuve could not afford to have the imaginary musical instruments used in the film built, so he went to Cirque du Soleil CEO Guy Laliberté and convinced him to buy them before they were even made. When Laliberté saw Villeneuve's TED Talk on 7 June 2013, he offered the filmmaker the "Gravophone" which is seen in the talk. Laliberté has thereby financed the creation of the instruments sculpted by artist Dominique Engel.

=== Casting ===
Most of the actors who appeared in the photo novels (most notably Jacques Languirand, Robert Lepage, Paul Ahmarani and Stéphane Demers) reprised their roles in the film, with the exception of Marie-Josée Croze (who portrayed the lead female character in the books), due to a schedule conflict. Caroline Dhavernas, who along with Croze was a roommate of Villeneuve during his college years, was then hired to play the part of Avril. Her mother Michèle Deslauriers, provided the Montreal Teleportation Service's voice in the film (she is also the voice of the real life metro service).

=== Filming ===
==== Principal photography ====
The film was almost entirely shot on green screen, in 25 days, using the RED digital camera.

Since Robert Lepage only had a few days available for filming, Villeneuve turned his character into a hologram and had another actor wearing a green hood stand in for his scenes during principal photography. An avant-garde 3D capturing technique was used to integrate him virtually into his scenes as a hologram. Six cameras were trained on Lepage's head while a mime, Jean Asselin, portrayed the body. The character became a cosmologist whose research into virtual technologies has extended to bold experiments on himself. His head is actually a hologram, with all of his ideas, memories and thoughts stored electronically. Additionally, in order to work around Lepage's extremely tight schedule, principal photography took place in Montreal in two segments; the first was in September 2008, and the second in April 2009.

This was radio host Jacques Languirand's first leading role in a feature film. Nearly 80 years old at the time, and being hard of hearing, he wore an ear-piece so that his wife, Nicole Dumais, could feed him his lines off set. When performing on the stage of the Liquid Pub with the band of old musicians played by Marcel Sabourin, André Montmorency and Gabriel Gascon, all cultural icons of Quebec like himself, they received a standing ovation from the 50 extras present during the shooting that lasted several minutes. The first assistant director had to stop the applause so as not fall behind schedule.

The Martian backgrounds were taken by photographer Denis McCready in the Mojave Desert using a panoramic film camera. The exact location is near Trona Pinnacles where several sci-fi movies and TV series were filmed including Battlestar Galactica, Star Trek V: The Final Frontier, The Gate II, Lost in Space and Planet of the Apes.

The scene where Jacob and Arthur are leaving for Mars is inspired by one of Villeneuve's childhood memories: when he was 4 or 5 years old, his older brothers (including Denis Villeneuve) put him in a box and made him believe that he made a space travel on his way to Mars.

==== Editing ====
By the end of 2009, the editing of a first cut was assembled. In 2010, Martin Villeneuve searched for new investments in order to complete the 550 VFX shots involved in the film. In early 2011, Anne-Marie Gélinas and Benoît Beaulieu joined Villeneuve as producers. Telefilm Canada and Alliance Vivafilm both accepted to raise their initial investment, and so did Robert Lepage and Lynda Beaulieu though their new Quebec city-based motion picture company, Les Productions du 8e Art. At this point, Pierre Even and Marie-Claude Poulin from Item 7 also joined the team as executive producers.

==== Re-shoot ====
In March 2011, exactly two years after principal photography was completed, a re-shoot took place at Lepage's request. The scene in which Jacob and Avril make love was shot in Languirand's actual bedroom. The final cut of the film was completed during the summer of the same year. Montreal-based post-production company Vision Globale (under the supervision of former ILM Senior Compositor Carlos Monzon) then started the visual effects and sound design.

== Music ==
Benoît Charest was tasked with scoring the music. Charest's score was composed according to Johannes Kepler's cosmological theory, Harmonices Mundi, in which the harmony of the universe is determined by the motion of celestial bodies, referenced in the film's opening voiced by Robert Lepage.

== Marketing and related works ==
The official trailer was released in Quebec theatres and on Alliance Vivafilm's YouTube channel on 21 December 2011. The official poster, designed by François Schuiten, was revealed online on 11 March 2012, once the film was entirely completed.

The first in a series of production videos unveiling the film's creation was released online 16 August 2012. A 22-minute "Making of" was aired on ARTV in October 2012 in order to promote the release of the film, and is now available with English subtitles on Vimeo.

=== TED Talk ===
On 27 February 2013, Martin Villeneuve gave a TED Talk about Mars et Avril at TED2013, thereby becoming the very first French Canadian speaker invited to this prestigious event that took place in Long Beach, California. Prior to his talk, the opening sequence of the film was shown, as well as a three minute overview of the steps leading from the green screen to the final images. Martin Villeneuve's talk, "How I made an impossible film," was released on TED.com on 7 June 2013, and a month later was added to TED's movie magic list, featuring famed directors such as James Cameron and J. J. Abrams. The talk has been viewed more than a million times across all platforms and subtitled in 30 languages. Since then, Mars et Avril has been referred to as the "Impossible Film".

== Release ==
The world premiere took place on 2 July 2012 at the 47th Karlovy Vary International Film Festival in the Czech Republic (the film was selected in the section "Another View" for its "unique" artistic approach in both form and content). In Canada, the film was first shown at the Atlantic Film Festival in Halifax, Nova Scotia on 15 September 2012. Mars et Avril was given a theatrical release in Quebec on 12 October 2012.

=== Festivals ===
- 27 September 2014: Festival du Film Canadien, Dieppe (closing gala)
- 22 March 2014: FICG Festival Internacional de Cine, Guadalajara, Mexico
- 29 September 2013: Lund Fantastisk Film Festival, Lund, Sweden
- 22 September 2013: UTOPIA — Tel-Aviv International Festival of Fantastic Film, Tel-Aviv
- 22 September 2013: Festival de Cinéma de la Ville de Québec & Vitesse Lumière
- 9 July 2013: Neuchâtel International Fantastic Film Festival
- 5 May 2013: Sci-Fi London Film Festival, London
- 14 April 2013: Imagine Film Festival, Amsterdam
- 3 April 2013: Brussels International Fantastic Film Festival, ("7th Orbit" 2013 international competition)
- 23 February 2013: Rendez-vous du cinéma québécois, Montreal, Quebec, Canada
- 11 February 2013: Boston Sci-Fi Film Festival, Boston (opening film)
- 6 December 2012: Monsters and Martians International Film Festival, Toronto (opening film)
- 1 December 2012: Whistler Film Festival (Section / Film Type: "Discoveries")
- 21 October 2012: Mumbai Film Festival, India
- 11 October 2012: Festival du Nouveau Cinéma, Montreal (opening film of the FOCUS section)
- 5 October 2012: Mill Valley Film Festival, California (U.S. premiere)
- 29 September 2012: Calgary International Film Festival (closing gala)
- 17 September 2012: Cinéfest Sudbury International Film Festival
- 15 September 2012: Atlantic Film Festival in Halifax (Canadian premiere)
- 2 July 2012: Karlovy Vary International Film Festival, (World premiere; section "Another View")

=== Distribution ===
==== Domestic home media, streaming, and soundtrack ====
The DVD of the film as well as the digital version on iTunes were released in Canada through Alliance Vivafilm on 19 March 2013, along with Benoît Charest's original soundtrack and the trailer music composed by Ramachandra Borcar. Following Charest's Félix win of Album of the Year on 22 October 2013 at the ADISQ Gala, a limited edition of 300 vinyl records were released by Simone Records as a nod to the retro-futuristic look of the film.

==== International distribution ====
In September 2013, Mars et Avril was sold to the U.S. and is now available on Amazon, on iTunes, on Google Play and on GaiamTV. The film is also available on iTunes in the UK, and all across Francophone Europe, among other digital platforms.

== Reception ==
=== Critical response ===
A trippy science fiction fable about the musicality of the universe that's set in Montreal and on the Red Planet, the sumptuously designed Mars et Avril is certainly one of a kind. (…) Sans rousing battle or action sequences, the film is that rare sci-fi spectacle that foregrounds elements other than Manichean ideas of good and evil — in this case romance, music and philosophizing about the universe. (…) Shot on a tight budget and with abundant use of green screen, the world Villeneuve puts onscreen nonetheless feels whole and, in the sci-fi context, credible.

— Boyd van Hoeij, in his review for Variety

Mars et Avril received generally positive reviews after its release in Quebec. The film also received mostly positive reviews upon its release in the international festival circuit, starting with a world premiere in Karlovy Vary. Brendan Kelly from The Gazette gave it 4.5 stars out of 5 and called it "light-hearted and inspired!" He wrote: "There's a sly wit at work here — that's one of the reasons I so liked Mars et Avril. It doesn't take itself too seriously while tackling some pretty weighty themes, like the nature of inspiration, the relationship between love and sensuality and the notion of how music can set you free. (…) An extraordinary universe that's remarkably inventive and impossible to forget." Mark Adams from Screen Daily was also quite enthusiastic, and described the settings as a "stunning futuristic Montreal, lovingly produced via the special effects, creating an unworldly and dreamy future city that fits perfectly with the graphic novel style." But Adams also noted that "the audience for the film will be relatively niche. This type of esoteric sci-fi — such as Enki Bilal's 2004 film Immortal (Ad Vitam) — works well in France and with fans of comics anthology Metal Hurlant and similar graphic novels, but rarely breaks out into the mainstream."

Online reviews also praised the film. Writing for Twitch Film, Shelagh M. Rowan-Legg claimed that it "deserves greater attention", adding: "Oh, what a wonderful, rich, glorious treat of a film Mars et Avril is. A sci-fi steam-punk romance with a terrific score, it is a delight to the senses. Visually stunning, melodramatic in its storytelling, and unafraid to delve into deep philosophical musings." Esther Inglis-Arkell from sci-fi authority io9 gave it her two thumbs up: "Mars et Avril is a movie that will surprise you. It has to, as every time it seems to go one way, it will twist off in a new direction. It will also give your eyes a good time (…) It looks beautiful and it looks different. This movie took seven years to make and inspired a TED talk about how to make an 'impossible' film. It's also one of the most beautiful, and immersive, science fiction worlds on film." Jay Seaver from efilmcritic.com called it a "thoroughly funky French-Canadian sci-fi!", and wrote: "All of this put together is a small, colorful delight – the funny bits come and go quickly enough to get their chuckles and not wear out their welcome, the whole thing is pretty, and the story that eventually gets told has some heft to it without ever losing sight of the film's goal of being entertaining."

== Accolades ==
Awards

- 11 February 2013: Boston Sci-Fi Film Festival, United States – Honorable mention for "incredible post-production work".
- 9 July 2013: Neuchâtel International Fantastic Film Festival, Switzerland (international competition) – Imaging the Future Award.
- 22 October 2013: Benoît Charest won the Félix in the category "Album of the year – original soundtrack" at the ADISQ Gala.

Nominations

- Canadian Screen Awards, 2013:
  - Achievement in Music – Original Score (Benoît Charest)
  - Achievement in Overall Sound (Pascal Beaudin, Daniel Bisson, Luc Boudrias, Olivier Calvert)
  - Achievement in Visual Effects (Vision Globale)
  - Best Adapted Screenplay (Martin Villeneuve)
- Jutra Awards 2013:
  - Best Art Direction (François Schuiten, Élisabeth Williams, Martin Tessier, Patrick Sioui)
  - Best Sound (Pascal Beaudin, Luc Boudrias, Olivier Calvert)
  - Best Costume Design (Mariane Carter)
  - Best Hairstyling (Richard Hansen)
  - Best Score (Benoît Charest)
- 23 February 2013: Rendez-vous du cinéma québécois, Montreal, Quebec, Canada – In competition for the Gilles-Carle Award.
- 9 July 2013: Neuchâtel International Fantastic Film Festival, Switzerland (international competition) – Narcisse Award for Best Feature Film.
