= Radius (film) =

- Directed by: Caroline Labrèche; Steeve Léonard
- Written by: Caroline Labrèche; Steeve Léonard
- Produced by: Anne-Marie Gélinas; Benoit Beaulieu; Jean Du Toit
- Starring: Diego Klattenhoff; Charlotte Sullivan
- Cinematography: Simon Villeneuve
- Edited by: Steeve Léonard
- Music by: Benoît Charest
- Production companies: EMA Films; Peripatetic Pictures; Title Media
- Distributed by: Filmoption International
- Release date: 17 July 2017
- Running time: 93 minutes
- Country: Canada
- Language: English

Radius is a 2017 Canadian science fiction thriller film directed and written by Caroline Labrèche and Steeve Léonard. It stars Diego Klattenhoff, Charlotte Sullivan, and Brett Donahue. Klattenhoff and Sullivan play two survivors of a car accident who discover that one causes the death of anyone who comes within a certain radius of him, and the other has the ability to nullify this effect.

== Plot ==
A man wakes from a car crash suffering with amnesia. He flags down a passing car, but the driver dies while swerving off the road. The man realizes he does not know where or who he is. Checking his wallet, he learns that his name is Liam Hartwell. While walking towards a town, Liam stops at a roadside diner where everyone is dead. Assuming the air to be poisonous, he uses a piece of his shirt to cover his nose and mouth and continues walking.

With a map from the diner and the address on his driver's licence, Liam finds his house. Inside, he hears news reports speculate about biological warfare. In response, he begins sealing a window with tape. Looking out, he sees a farmer, and tries to warn him to leave the area. The farmer approaches and suddenly drops dead. When Liam notices that animals also die in his proximity, he realises he is the cause of the unexplained deaths, not a virus.

A woman also suffering with amnesia comes to Liam's house, revealing that she was with him during the car accident. He is surprised that she can approach him without dying. Neither knows why they were travelling together or what caused the crash. The woman, Jane Doe, and Liam investigate the crash site, where they find a charred circle. Liam explains his theory about the deaths. Jane reacts fearfully, insisting that he stay away from her. A passing police officer sees their altercation and questions Liam. She drops dead when Jane walks off.

Using a goat, Liam shows Jane that living creatures near him will die unless she is within 15 metres. Jane was CT scanned after the crash, and she and Liam decide he should be tested too. They drive to a hospital. By now, Liam knows he has been linked to the human deaths and is wanted by police. Officers arrive at the hospital as a doctor informs Liam he is healthy. Worried that the police may separate them, he and Jane flee. Jane pauses, vaguely recalling a missing person poster. When she refocuses, Liam has entered an elevator without her. She races to follow it. Liam urges the occupants to leave as soon as the doors open, and he tries to isolate himself until Jane can rejoin him. They finally leave the hospital together, relieved that nobody has died.

A news report reveals Jane's name to be Rose Daerwood. Her husband, Sam, appeals for her to come home. Rose persuades Liam that they should ask him for help. Sam does not believe their story at first, but Liam again demonstrates the deaths of animals who get too close. Sam explains that Rose disappeared while searching for her missing twin sister, Lily. Rose recalls being suicidal and Liam saving her life. As Liam and Rose grow closer, Sam becomes jealous. This dynamic worsens when Liam and Rose plan on fleeing to Liam's remote cabin without Sam. Sam calls the police but then regrets doing so, warning the fugitives too late. Several police officers and many onlookers die while Liam and Rose are being separated, forcing Sam to agree to their plan.

On the way to Liam's cabin, he and Rose learn that an unexplained cosmic anomaly struck Earth in the spot where they had their accident. While exploring the cabin, Rose finds evidence that Liam is a serial killer who abducted and killed her sister, Lily. Separately, Liam remembers attempting to abduct and kill Rose at the time of the cosmic anomaly. As Rose confronts Liam, a man and his two adult sons take them hostage. The man instructs his sons to kill Liam. Rose lets them separate her from Liam, causing the father and one son to die. The remaining son shoots Rose. Liam's aura kills the remaining son, and Liam drives Rose to the hospital. There, as Rose is taken away for treatment, Liam shoots himself in the head.

== Cast ==
- Diego Klattenhoff as Liam Hartwell
- Charlotte Sullivan as Jane / Rose Grayson Daerwood / Lily Grayson
- Brett Donahue as Sam Daerwood

== Production ==
The initial idea came from two sources. The first one was the climactic reveal from Oldboy, where two characters were revealed to have a secret connection. The second was an old comic book storyline in which Superman was helpless to save people because they would die if they came into contact with him. Shooting took place in Manitoba, starting in June 2016.

== Release ==
Radius premiered at the Fantasia International Film Festival on 17 July 2017.

== Critical response ==
On review aggregator website Rotten Tomatoes, the film has an approval rating of 93% based on 15 reviews and an average rating of 7.30/10.
