= Little Jesus =

2023 Canadian-French comedy film

- French: Petit Jésus
- Directed by: Julien Rigoulot
- Written by: Benjamin Charbit; Sophie Glaas; Julien Rigoulot
- Produced by: Pierre Even; Laetitia Galitzine
- Starring: Antoine Bertrand; Esteban Azuara Eymard; Gérard Darmon
- Cinematography: Emmanuel Soyer
- Edited by: Olivier Gajan
- Music by: Mathieu Lafontaine
- Production companies: Chapka Films; Item 7 Wild Bunch
- Distributed by: Wild Bunch; Sphere Distribution
- Release date: July 12, 2023
- Running time: 95 minutes
- Countries: Canada; France
- Language: French

Little Jesus (French: Petit Jésus) is a 2023 Canadian-French co-produced comedy film, directed by Julien Rigoulot. The film stars Antoine Bertrand as Jean, a recently divorced father who becomes convinced that his son Louis (Esteban Azuara Eymard) is the Second Coming of Jesus.

== Cast ==
Loulou, a ten-year-old boy • Esteban Azuara Eymard
Jean, Loulou's father • Antoine Bertrand
Alice, Loulou's mother • Caroline Anglade
Bernard, Jean's father • Gérard Darmon
Rémy, a priest • Bruno Sanches
Hakim, a lawyer and Jean's friend • Youssef Hajdi
Judge • Ludivine de Chastenet
Dr. Essaïdi • Lisa Brebion

== Production ==
Shooting took place from 30 May through 7 July 2002 in the area of Perpignan, France.

== Release ==
The film opened in French theatres in July 2023. It had its Canadian premiere at the 2023 Cinéfest Sudbury International Film Festival.

== Reception ==
David Brejon found the film funny, poetic, and moving, awarding it 3 stars.

Writing for Première, Thierry Chèze gave the film 2 stars for not really delivering enough on the film's interesting premise.

Writing for Bulles de culture, Antoine Corte praised the scenic backdrop and the direction of a child actor in his first role in the director's first film, but faulted what he considered lazy characterization (Gérard Darmon's character is a carbon-copy of his role in La Flamme) and a comic religious story that makes little impact.

Writing foe Télérama, Frédéric Strauss criticized the film's pacing, its treatment of Loulou as a circus animal surrounded by childish characters, and what he called its mockery of the Catholic Church.
