= Tectonic Plates (film) =

1992 Canadian film by Peter Mettler

- Directed by: Peter Mettler
- Screenplay by: Peter Mettler
- Based on: Tectonic Plates by Robert Lepage and Théâtre Repère
- Produced by: Debra Hauer; Niv Fichman
- Starring: Marie Gignac; Robert Lepage; Céline Bonnier
- Cinematography: Miroslaw Baszak; Peter Mettler
- Edited by: Mike Munn
- Music by: Michel Gosselin; Frédéric Chopin; Yuval Fichman
- Production companies: Rhombus Media; Hauer-Rawlence Productions
- Release date: 1992
- Running time: 104 minutes
- Country: Canada
- Language: English

Tectonic Plates is a 1992 Canadian film directed by Peter Mettler, with a screenplay by Mettler based on a stage play by Robert Lepage and Théâtre Repère. It stars Marie Gignac, Robert Lepage and Céline Bonnier. The film won awards including the Catholic Jury Prize for Best Film of the Festival at Mannheim, and was screened at festivals in Rotterdam, Jerusalem and San Sebastián.

== Synopsis ==
Madeleine is an art student in Montreal who falls in love with her lecturer, Jacques. Antoine, a deaf-mute librarian, is also in love with Jacques. After Jacques disappears, Madeleine travels to Venice, where she hopes to die romantically, but instead becomes involved with Constance, a Scottish woman who uses heroin. After Constance drowns, Madeleine continues her life. Years later, she meets Antoine again and learns that Jacques now lives as Jennifer. Antoine then travels to New York in search of Jacques/Jennifer.

== Cast ==
The cast includes:

- Marie Gignac as Madeleine
- Robert Lepage as Jacques/Jennifer
- Céline Bonnier as Constance
- Richard Fréchette as Antoine
- Boyd Clack as Rhys
- Michael Benson as the waiter
- Normand Bissonnette as Kevin/Chopin

== Production ==
The film was adapted from Robert Lepage’s stage play Tectonic Plates, which he developed with Théâtre Repère in Quebec between 1987 and 1991. Mettler became interested in the form developed by Lepage and the company, collaborated with them for a year, and wrote the screenplay for a film version.

== Festival screenings ==
The film screened at festivals including the 22nd Rotterdam Film Festival, the Jerusalem Film Festival, the Festival Internacional de Cinema da Figueira da Foz, the 41st San Sebastián International Film Festival and the 42nd International Film Festival Mannheim-Heidelberg in 1993. It later screened at the 51st Festival dei Popoli in Florence in 2010.

== Reception ==
=== Critical response ===
Filmdienst described Tectonic Plates as an original and sensuous adaptation of a complex stage work by Théâtre Repère. The review highlighted the film’s use of the continental-drift motif, writing that it develops into a reflection on human and cultural evolution. It also noted the film’s blending of theatrical and cinematic forms.

=== Awards ===
In 1993, the film won awards including the Catholic Jury Prize for Best Film of the Festival at the International Film Festival of Mannheim, the Grand Prize for Most Creative or Innovative Film of the Festival at the Columbus International Film & Video Festival, and the Grand Prize for Most Innovative Film of the Festival at the Festival International de Cinema de Figueira da Foz.
