= Benoît Charest =

Canadian guitarist and film score composer

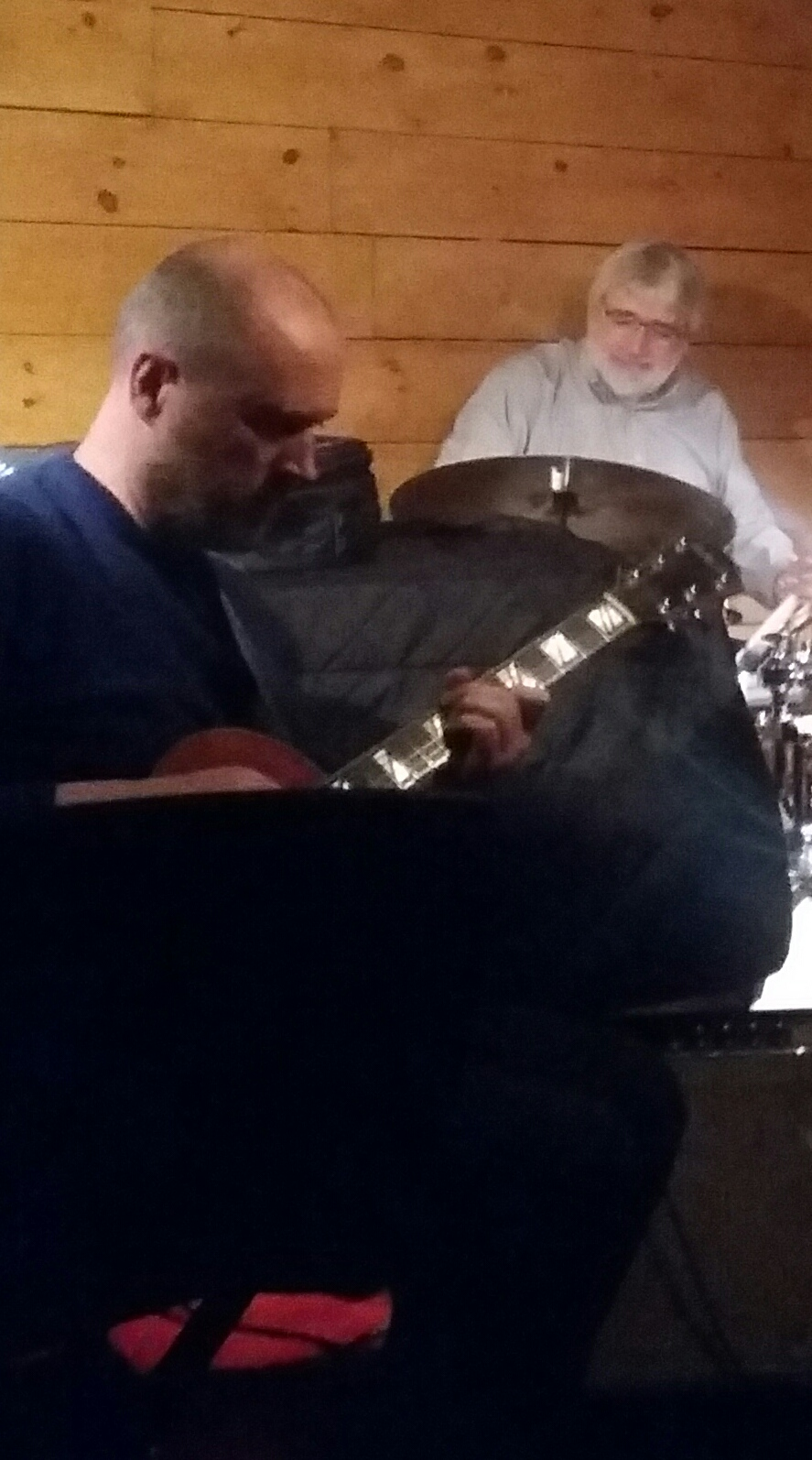
- Benoît Charest photographed in Montréal, Québec, Canada at Diese Onze.

Background information
- Born: 1964 (age 61–62); Montreal, Quebec
- Occupations: Guitarist, film score composer
- Instrument: Guitar

Benoît Charest (French pronunciation: [bənwa ʃaʁɛ]; born in 1964) is a Canadian guitarist and film score composer from Quebec. He is best known for the soundtrack of the animated film The Triplets of Belleville (Les Triplettes de Belleville) (2003), for which he won a César Award for Best Music Written for a Film as well as a Los Angeles Film Critics Association Award for Best Music. The song "Belleville Rendez-vous", in particular, earned him an Academy Award nomination as well as a Grammy Award nomination.

== Biography ==
Benoît Charest was born in Montreal in 1964. At the age of 13 he started playing guitar and learned to play the songs of The Beatles and Led Zeppelin by ear. He later discovered jazz and decided at 17 to undertake private lessons with Neil Smolar, a graduate from the Berklee School of Music in Boston. During his college studies, Charest earned a living playing with established jazz musicians in Montreal.

In 1991, Charest produced his first score for Montréal rétro, a documentary produced by the National Film Board of Canada; he composed, arranged and conducted the music for the film. In the late 1990s, Charest co-founded Ben & Max Studios with musician Maxime Morin (better known as DJ Champion) — a company specializing in jingles and soundtracks. In 2001 Morin sold his share in the company back to Charest in order to continue his own personal musical career.

Charest has written music for such films as Polytechnique, Route 132, A Bottle in the Gaza Sea and Upside Down. Charest composed the score for the 2009 National Film Board of Canada animated short Runaway, written and directed by Cordell Barker. He wrote the soundtrack for Martin Villeneuve's sci-fi film Mars et Avril, nominated at the 2013 Canadian Screen Awards and at the 2013 Jutra Awards for Achievement in music - Original score.

Charest composed the soundtrack for the 2003 animated film The Triplets of Belleville (Les Triplettes de Belleville). The film's score garnered him a César Award for Best Music Written for a Film and the song "Belleville Rendez-vous" earned him an Academy Award nomination for Best Original Song in 2004. Charest, along with his then wife, vocalist Béatrice Bonifassi, performed "Belleville Rendez-vous" at the 76th Academy Awards ceremony — Maxime Morin played percussion on a bicycle during the live performance.

Charest has also composed music for television, theatre, and more than sixty commercials.

On October 22, 2013, Benoît Charest won the Félix in the category "Album of the year – original soundtrack" at the ADISQ Gala for his work on Mars et Avril. For the occasion, a limited edition of 300 vinyl records of the soundtrack was released, as a nod to the retro-futuristic look of the film.

== Selected filmography ==
- 1992: Montréal rétro
- 1999: Matroni and Me (Matroni et moi)
- 2000: Life After Love (La Vie après l'amour)
- 2000: The Secret Adventures of Jules Verne (TV series, 1 episode)
- 2003: The Triplets of Belleville (Les Triplettes de Belleville)
- 2006: Maxed Out: Hard Times, Easy Credit and the Era of Predatory Lenders (documentary)
- 2007: My Aunt Aline (Ma tante Aline)
- 2008: Adam's Wall
- 2009: Runaway (short)
- 2009: Polytechnique
- 2010: Route 132
- 2011: A Bottle in the Gaza Sea
- 2012: Upside Down
- 2012: Mars et Avril
- 2013: The Boy Who Smells Like Fish
- 2014: The Wanted 18
- 2015: Jonathan Strange & Mr Norrell (TV series, composed with Benoît Groulx)
- 2015: Paul à Québec
- 2017: Radius
- 2020: Imelda Trilogy
- 2022: The 12 Tasks of Imelda (Les 12 travaux d'Imelda)
- 2023: Victoire (La Cordonnière)

== Awards and nominations ==
Awards

- 2013: Félix in the category Album of the year – original soundtrack at the ADISQ Gala, Mars et Avril.
- 2004: César Award for Best Music Written for a Film, The Triplets of Belleville (Les Triplettes de Belleville).
- 2004: Los Angeles Film Critics Association Award for Best Music, The Triplets of Belleville (Les Triplettes de Belleville).
- 2004: Golden Star of the French Cinema Press for Achievement in music, The Triplets of Belleville (Les Triplettes de Belleville).
- 2004: Félix Award for Achievement in music, The Triplets of Belleville (Les Triplettes de Belleville).

Nominations

- 2013: Canadian Screen Awards and Jutra Awards for Achievement in music - Original score, Mars et Avril.
- 2013: Jutra Awards for Achievement in music - Original score, A Bottle in the Gaza Sea.
- 2005: Grammy Award nomination, The Triplets of Belleville (Les Triplettes de Belleville).
- 2004: Academy Award nomination, The Triplets of Belleville (Les Triplettes de Belleville).
