= Michel Barrette =

Canadian actor

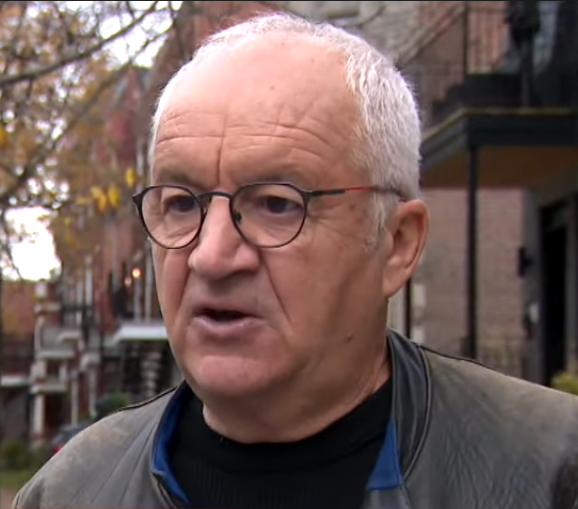
- Michel Barrette during an interview
- Born: 26 April 1957 (age 69); Chicoutimi, Quebec, Canada
- Occupations: Actor, comedian, humorist
- Years active: 1982–present

Michel Barrette (born April 26, 1957) is a Canadian television and movie actor, television and radio host, and stand-up comedian. He has played various roles in Quebec movies and television shows since 1982.

== Life ==
Barrette was born in Chicoutimi, Quebec. After serving in the Canadian Armed Forces, he started his movie acting career in 1982 and appeared in nearly a dozen movies, including Les Boys in the first part of the series in 1997 (as Roger, a defenceman for a garage league team), Aurore, and The Rocket (Maurice Richard), a tribute to life of the former Montreal Canadiens superstar Maurice "Rocket" Richard. He also appeared in several popular television series, including La Petite Vie in 1995, Scoop and Paparazzi. His most important role in television and arguably in his entire acting career was in KM/H, a TVA TV series in which he played the main character for nearly eight years. His second main role was as a detective in the series Un homme mort in 2006.

Barrette has also been one of the most notable stand-up comedians in Quebec since 1983 and performed several one-man comedy shows province-wide, including En spectacle avec Michel Barrette in 1989, 100% Barrette in 1997, Quelques exces in 2000, 20 ans deja, je me souviens in 2004 and Michel Barrette, 100% neuf in 2006. He was also part of a major show to aid victims of the 1996 Saguenay Flood. He was a regular guest on Normand Brathwaite's satirical television show Piment Fort in the 1990s. His first famous role was his stand-up character named Roland "Hi-Ha" Tremblay, which became a hit around 1988. It was the basis for Serge Gaboury's comic strip of the same name and also started the career of comic/actor Vincent Bolduc, who became famous by playing the same routine at age 9 or 10.

He previously hosted, with Jean-Marc Parent, Casse-Tête, a Télé-Metropole show for the 1987 and 1988 seasons while he also hosted the TVA show Planete en folie in 1998.

He hosted several radio shows, including morning shows on Montreal radio stations CKOI, CKMF and more recently CHMP-FM.

In 2005, he traded one snowmobile to Kyle MacDonald of the book One Red Paperclip for a "party in a keg" invention (a beer keg and a neon sign). The trade was a part of multiple consecutive bartering deals that allowed MacDonald to trade in a red paperclip for a house.

In 2022, Barrette played in Martin Villeneuve's The 12 Tasks of Imelda (Les 12 travaux d'Imelda), co-starring playwright Robert Lepage and actress-singer Ginette Reno, in which he plays Martin and Denis Villeneuve's uncle André.

== Filmography ==
=== Cinema ===
- The Emperor of Peru - 1982
- Angel Square - 1990
- Montreal Stories (Montréal vu par...) - 1991
- Coyote - 1992
- The Postmistress - 1992
- Les Boys - 1997
- Alice's Odyssey (L'odyssée d'Alice Tremblay) - 2002
- Father and Sons (Père et fils) - 2003
- Bittersweet Memories (Ma vie en cinémascope) - 2004
- How to Conquer America in One Night (Comment conquérir l'Amérique en une nuit) - 2004
- The Rocket (Maurice Richard) - 2005
- Je me souviens - 2009
- The Hair of the Beast (Le poil de la bête) - 2010
- Crying Out (À l'origine d'un cri) - 2010
- The Happiness of Others (Le Bonheur des autres) - 2011
- The 12 Tasks of Imelda (Les 12 travaux d'Imelda) - 2022
- Two Days Before Christmas (23 décembre) - 2022

=== Television ===
- Bye Bye (1990, 1996)
- La Petite Vie (1995)
- Scoop (1992–1995)
- 10-07: L'affaire Zeus (1995)
- 10-07: L'affaire Kalka (1996)
- Paparazzi (1997)
- KM/H (1998–2006)
- Un homme mort (2006)
- Le Gentleman (2009)
- Rock et Rolland (2010)
