= The 12 Tasks of Imelda =

2022 Canadian film directed by Martin Villeneuve

- French: Les 12 travaux d'Imelda
- Directed by: Martin Villeneuve
- Written by: Martin Villeneuve
- Produced by: Benoit Beaulieu; Martin Villeneuve
- Starring: Martin Villeneuve; Robert Lepage; Ginette Reno; Michel Barrette; Anne-Marie Cadieux; Antoine Bertrand; Yves Jacques; Lynda Beaulieu; Marc-François Blondin
- Cinematography: Benoit Beaulieu; Richard Duquette; Marianne Ploska
- Edited by: Arthur Tarnowski
- Music by: Benoît Charest
- Production company: Imelda Films
- Distributed by: Maison 4:3
- Release date: September 9, 2022 (FCVQ)
- Running time: 93 minutes
- Country: Canada
- Language: French

The 12 Tasks of Imelda (French: Les 12 travaux d'Imelda) is a Canadian comedy-drama feature film, written, produced and directed by Martin Villeneuve, and released in 2022. Based on the last twelve years of Villeneuve's paternal grandmother Mélenda "Imelda" Turcotte-Villeneuve's life, the film stars the filmmaker as Imelda, an elderly widow on a quest to settle unresolved scores as she approaches age 100.

The film expands on a series of short films Villeneuve previously made starring the character. Three chapters in the series — Imelda (2014), Imelda 2: le notaire (2020) and Imelda 3: Simone (2020) — were released as standalone short films, constituting the "Imelda Trilogy"; several further short films featuring the character have been made and were integrated to the feature film.

The cast includes Robert Lepage, Ginette Reno, Michel Barrette, Anne-Marie Cadieux, Antoine Bertrand, Yves Jacques, Lynda Beaulieu and Marc-François Blondin. Since the Canadian funding agencies SODEC and Telefilm Canada declined to finance this feature film, all of the cast and crew, who had already taken part in the short films, agreed to work on it as unpaid volunteers.

The film premiered on September 9, 2022, at the Quebec City Film Festival, before going into commercial release in 29 theaters across Quebec on October 28 of the same year.

It was also screened at the 2022 Whistler Film Festival, where Arthur Tarnowski won the award for Best Editing in a Borsos Competition film. In 2023, Martin Villeneuve won the Best Actor award at the Festival du Film Canadien de Dieppe in France in March for his role of Imelda, and won the Best Director award at the Canada China International Film Festival in August.

In 2023, The 12 Tasks of Imelda was released on DVD as well as on several online platforms.

A sequel film, Imelda Strikes Back (Imelda contre-attaque), was released in 2026.
