= Montreal Stories =

- French: Montréal vu par...
- Directed by: Denys Arcand; Michel Brault; Atom Egoyan; Jacques Leduc; Léa Pool; Patricia Rozema
- Written by: Paule Baillargeon; Denys Arcand; Michel Brault; Atom Egoyan; Jacques Leduc; Léa Pool; Patricia Rozema
- Produced by: Doris Girard; Michel Houle; Yves Rivard; Denise Robert; Peter Sussman
- Cinematography: François Aubry; Éric Cayla; Paul Sarossy
- Edited by: Susan Shipton; Dominique Fortin
- Music by: Jean Corriveau; Michel F. Côté; Mychael Danna; Diane Labrosse; Yves Laferrière; Osvaldo Montes
- Production companies: Atlantis Films; Cinémaginaire; National Film Board of Canada
- Release date: 1991
- Running time: 125 minutes
- Country: Canada

Montreal Stories (French: Montréal vu par...), also titled Montreal Sextet in some releases, is a Canadian drama film, released in 1991 as a homage to the city of Montreal, Quebec on the occasion of its 350th anniversary. Written and directed by Denys Arcand, Michel Brault, Atom Egoyan, Jacques Leduc, Léa Pool and Patricia Rozema, the film is an anthology of six short films, one by each of the credited directors.

== Cast ==
Actors appearing in the films include Denys Arcand, Philippe Ayoub, Paule Baillargeon, Michel Barrette, Claude Blanchard, Domini Blythe, Geneviève Brouillette, Maury Chaykin, Anne Dorval, Rémy Girard, Élise Guilbault, Yves Jacques, Arsinée Khanjian, Alexandrine Latendresse, Charlotte Laurier, Véronique Le Flaguais, Robert Lepage, Maria del Mar, Sheila McCarthy, Monique Mercure, Jean-Louis Millette, Guylaine St-Onge, Raoul Trujillo, Suzanne Champagne, John Gilbert and Guillermo Verdecchia.

== Segments ==
- "Desperanto" (Rozema) — A young housewife from Toronto (Sheila McCarthy) explores Montreal's nightlife.
- "La Toile du temps" (Leduc) — The history of a painting of former Montreal mayor Jacques Viger.
- "La Dernière partie" (Brault) — Madeleine (Hélène Loiselle) tries to tell Roger (Jean Mathieu) she wants a divorce after forty years of marriage.
- "En passant" (Egoyan) — A visitor to a conference arrives at the airport.
- "Rispondetemi" (Pool) — En route to the hospital in an ambulance after a car accident, Sarah (Anne Dorval) recalls her life.
- "Vue d'ailleurs" (Arcand) — At a diplomatic reception, an older woman (Domini Blythe) reminisces about a love affair in Montreal in 1967.

== See also ==
- The Memories of Angels, a collage film about Montreal
- Cosmos, a 1996 film which assigned the same premise to six young emerging directors
