= Aube Foglia =

Canadian film editor

- Occupation: Film editor

Aube Foglia is a Canadian film editor. She is most noted as a four-time Jutra/Iris Award nominee for Best Editing, receiving nominations at the 1st Jutra Awards in 1999 for Nô, the 4th Jutra Awards in 2002 for Between the Moon and Montevideo, the 20th Quebec Cinema Awards in 2018 for The Little Girl Who Was Too Fond of Matches (La petite fille qui aimait trop les allumettes), and the 23rd Quebec Cinema Awards in 2021 for Night of the Kings (La nuit des rois).

In addition, she received a nomination for Best Editing in a Documentary at the 22nd Quebec Cinema Awards in 2020 for Dark Suns (Soleils noirs), and a Canadian Screen Award nomination for Best Editing at the 10th Canadian Screen Awards in 2022 for Night of the Kings.

Her other credits have included the films An Imaginary Tale (Une histoire inventée), Poor Man's Pudding (Pudding chômeur), The Three Madeleines (Les Fantômes des 3 Madeleine), On the Verge of a Fever (Le Goût des jeunes filles), Suzie, Black Eyed Dog, For the Love of God (Pour l'amour de Dieu), Triptych (Triptyque), Absences, The Handout (Autrui), The Sound of Trees (Le Bruit des arbres), Our Own (Les Nôtres), North of Albany (Au nord d'Albany) and Bootlegger.
