= Canada China International Film Festival =

Film festival in Montreal, Quebec

Canada China International Film Festival (CCIFF)
- Location: Montreal, Quebec, Canada
- Founded: 2016
- Awards: Best Director, Best Feature Film, Best Documentary Film, Best Short Film, Best Actor, Best Actress, etc.
- Hosted by: Canada China Art-Tech and mDreams Pictures
- No. of films: 85
- Language: English, French, Chinese
- Website: www.cciff.ca

The Canada China International Film Festival (CCIFF) (French: Festival international du film Canada Chine, Chinese: 中加国际电影节) is an annual film festival held primarily in Montreal, Quebec, Canada. The film festival is hosted by Canada China Art-Tech (CCAT), a non-profit organization, and is coordinated by mDreams Pictures Inc. CCIFF promotes the exchange between the Chinese and Canadian film culture, fosters cooperation, and encourages communication between artists and filmmakers. The festival is a platform for innovation and creation by showcasing the latest entertainment technology.

CCIFF is officially acknowledged and supported by the following authorities: China Film Administration (previously as State Administration of Press, Publication, Radio, Film and Television of The People's Republic of China); Telefilm Canada; China Film Producers’ Association; China Film Group Corporation; China Film Archive; Embassy of the People's Republic of China in Canada; Consulate General of the People's Republic of China in Montreal; City Hall of Montreal; National Film Board of Canada; SODEC (Société de Développement des Entreprises Culturelles); QFTC (The Quebec Film and Television Council); Concordia University, Shanghai International Film Festival Committee; Beijing International Film Festival Committee; Beijing Normal University Documentary Center; Chinese Culture Translation and Studies Support, and others.

== Organizer ==
The festival is run by Canada China Art-Tech (CCAT), a non-profit organization dedicated to promoting and understanding cultural differences in the film industry between Canada and China. CCAT stimulates cultural dialogue between the two nations by connecting stakeholders in the fields of art, technology and digital interactive media to provide them with opportunities for collaboration abroad. CCAT works in film, television, virtual reality, augmented reality, digital content and new media entertainment.

== Events ==
Seven sections are included in the festival every year: the Opening Ceremony, Film Screening and Competition, Women's Voice in Film and Television, Entertainment Technology Summit & B2B, Master Class, Academic Seminar, and the Gala and Awards Ceremony.

=== Opening ceremony ===
The opening ceremony of the Canada China International Film festival is held in Montreal, Toronto and Ottawa. Around 100 audiences and guests, including government officials, celebrities, directors and filmmakers from both Canada and China, attend the opening ceremony annually.

=== Film screenings ===
In-person film screening are held for 3 consecutive days during the film festival in locations around Montreal including Cineplex, BanQ, Cinémathèque québécoise, Cinema Moderne, Cinema du Parc and Musee du Beaux Arts. Online film screenings are held for one month on the Smart Cinema platform. The festival screens 40 remarkable films with various genres of films and television shows including features, documentaries, short films and animated films.

=== Competition ===
The film competition section is one of the core programs of CCIFF. The Jury selects around 40 films in the Screening section from more than 100 submissions. About 30 films are selected to enter the final round of competition. The jury then determines 26 award winners at the final round as well as 4 TV awards.

=== Entertainment technology summit and B2B ===
The Entertainment Technology Forum is an important platform for technology exchanges and academic discussion in the film festival. The guests include executives and leaders from Cirque du Soleil, Disney, IBM, and Google. Like, Nasim Sedaghat (IBM Product Manager), Jacques Méthé (Chairman of Cirque du Soleil), Rajesh Sharma (Technical Director of Disney Animation Studios), and Paul Debevec (Senior Researcher from Google), etc.

== History ==
In 2016, Prime Minister Justin Trudeau visited China on September 2. He wanted to make a stronger and more stable long-term relationship with China. Bardish Chagger announced new tourism initiatives. In 2016, CCIFF held several events in the special section to celebrate the China-Canada year of People-To-People and Culture Exchanges, including a summit forum on audiovisual exchanges and communication, a master class, and an industry tour.

In 2017, CCIFF added TV Drama section to the Film Screening section. This year CCIFF celebrates Canada's 150th anniversary, Montreal's 375th anniversary, and the 70th anniversary of People's Liberation Army of China. A script competition is also included in the Canada China Co-production Project Pitch.

From September 22–26, 2018, the 3rd CCIFF was held by Canada China Art-Tech and mDreams Pictures in Montreal, Quebec. The festival attracted more people thanks to the year of Canada-China tourism in 2018. The aim of the international film festival is to promote the cultural exchanges between China and Canada, cooperation and communication are also want to be developed and encouraged by both countries. In addition, the newest innovations in entertainment technology will be shown by forum and technology exhibition.

The year 2019 was the 70th anniversary of the founding of the People's Republic of China. On this occasion, the Canada China International Film Festival kicked off its 4th edition with the opening film "Enter the Forbidden City", directed by Mei Hu as well as other excellent Chinese world premieres during its screening program.

In 2020, the 5th CCIFF was adjusted due to the COVID-19 pandemic and was divided into two parts: The Entertainment Technology Summit and the Online Film Screening. From September 18 to December 18, 2020, three forum activities were successfully held online. The screening component was held from April 1 to 30, 2021 where a total of 10 films from China, Canada and the United States were screened.

In 2021, the opening cocktail reception for the 6th edition of the CCIFF kicked off at McCord Museum. CCIFF has been adjusted to a hybrid format consisting of offline and online events due to health and safety-related mandates brought on by the COVID-19 pandemic. As a result, events were held offline and online throughout the festival, from October 2, 2021, to November 30, 2021. In addition, the screening month was held from October 22 to November 30, 2021, where a total of 23 films from China, Canada and the United States were shown.

== Awards ==
=== 2025 ===
Awards	Recipients
Best Director	Muze Tian (Meng Tian) (Love Island)
Best Feature Film	Mei Hu (The Dream of The Red Chamber)
Best Female-Directed Film	Jiaxi Li (In Expecting for the First Time)
Best Short Film	Yuhong Lu, Zhuqing Li, Xilai Li (Revert)
Best Short Musical	Crystal Leger (Meatball)
Best Art Direction	Jinqi Pi (Yingning)
Best Cinematography	Gabriela Pua (Caged Culture)
Best Actor	Réal Bossé (fr:Crise d'ado)
Best Actress	Myriam Lopez (Facade)
Best Emerging Actress	Vanel Lavoie (fr:Crise d'ado)
Best Script	Jiaxi Li (Wen Rou)
Best Biopic	Baosheng Hong (The Admirable Educator)
Best Documentary Film	Bibo Liang (My Teacher and Me)
People's Choice	Jimmy Chan (Journey of Dragon Boat Racers)
Best AIGC Creation	Pang Shuo (The Code of Nine Dragon Wall)

=== 2024 ===
Awards	Recipients
Best Director	Qiao Liang (Off the Stage)
Best Feature Film	Fight for Tomorrow
Best Actor	David La Haye (STAT)
Best Actress	He Saifei (Off the Stage)
Best TV Documentary	P’o Yan Hospital: A Legacy of Universal Benevolence Since 1886
Best Documentary Film	Only Xie Jin
Best Producer	Luo Dajun, Huang Dong (Tibet - Suolangrangbu)
Best Producer	Jialu Niu (The Sun Shines on Tashkurgan)
Best Creativity	White Snake
Best Cinematography	A Family Portrait
Best Short Film	Winter Is No More Lonely Than Other Seasons
Best First Feature	FRAME

=== 2023 ===
Awards	Recipients
Best Short Film	Wok Hei
People's Choice	My Father's Journey
Best New Director	Michael Cutler (La passion de Paul-Émile Borduas)
Best Original Score	Deep Sea
Best Drama	Almost Lost
Best Producer	Anuli Ajagu (Praise Party)
Best Animation Film	Katak: The Brave Beluga
Best Creativity	Answer
Best Script	Katherine Jerkovic (Coyote)
Best TV Documentary	Wuyi Mountains
Best Actor	Patrick Caux (La passion de Paul-Émile Borduas)
Best Actress	Rim Turki (Memory Box)
Best Documentary Film	Big Fight in Little Chinatown
Best Director	Martin Villeneuve (The 12 Tasks of Imelda)
Best Feature Film	HACHIKO

=== 2022 ===
Awards	Recipients
Best Short Film	RESURGO
Best Documentary Film	Jimmy Chan (Saving Chinatown - Our Heritage, Our Legend)
Best First Feature	Le bruit des moteurs
Best Script	Albéric Aurtenèche (La Contemplation du mystère)
Best Actor	Ayham Abou Ammar (Peace by Chocolate)
Best Director	Craig Thompson (Norman Bethune)
Best Feature Film	Mo Yan
Best Supporting Actor	Tzi Ma (A Father's Son)
Best Actress & Life Achievement Award	Lisa Lu (Pursuit of Light)

=== 2021 ===
Awards	Recipients
Best Director	Tracey Deer (Beans (2020 film))
Best Feature Film	A Hustle Bustle New Year
Best Actress	Nahéma Ricci (Antigone)
Best Actor	Jiang Wu (Break Through the Darkness)
Best Supporting Actress	Soinam Wangmo (Wind)
Best Supporting Actor	Jinheng Yang (Aksa)
Best Cinematography	Anima
Best Script	Portraits from a Fire
People's Choice	En panne
Best New Director	Ming Liang (Wisdom Tooth)
Best Creativity	Open Season
Best Short Film	Climate Rebellion Halifax Canada
Best Experimental Film	A Feeling Called Collapse
Best TV Series	Faith Makes Great
Best TV Series	Children of the Great Bay Area

=== 2020 ===
Awards	Recipients
Best Feature Film	The Farewell
Best TV Series	Realize Our Dream
Best Cinematography	Back to Youth
Best Special Effects	Yue Xiao (A Tower on the Mountain)
Best Animation	The Stone and the Sea
Best Documentary Film	Tribe Over the Cloud
Best TV Documentary	Hi China (TV series)
Best Script	The Melody of Silence
Best Short Film	Through the Seasons
Best New Actor/Actress	QiuQiu (Xi'An Blues)
Best Producer	Clifton Ko (Dearest Anita)
People's Choice	The Front Line
Best Actress	Yan Liu (My Dear Liar)
Best Actor	Guillaume Tremblay (Wilcox)
Best Director	Tongdao Zhang (Born in 2000)

=== 2019 ===
Awards	Recipients
Best TV Series	Jinghong Xiao (My Story for You)
Best TV Series	Chen Yang (Ever Night)
Best Cinematography	Pengfei Shen (Beauty Valley)
Best Special Effects	Yue Xiao (Assassin on the String)
Best Animation	Li Luo (The King's Avatar: For the Glory)
Best Documentary Film	Qianya Xu (Her Offerings)
Best Script	Liu Yi (If Thoughts Can Kill)
Best Short Film	Jorge Camarotti (Kinship)
Best New Talent	Kyle Hu (Love in the Air)
Best Producer	Li Li (Enter the Forbidden City)
People's Choice	Apprenticeship
Best Actress	Amber Goldfarb (Appiness)
Best Actor	Jinghan Ma (Enter the Forbidden City)
Best Director	Mei Hu (Enter the Forbidden City)
Best Film	The Hummingbird Project

=== 2018 ===
Awards	Recipients
Best TV Series	He Xiaofeng (Scissor Seven)
Best Cinematography	Yuezi Ouyang (Feeling You)
Best Special Effects	Yang Lu (Sticks and Straw)
Best Technology	Wei He (Do Not Miss It 70 Years of National Film in Inner Mongolia)
Best Documentary Film	Thi Be Nguyen, Marie-Hélène Panisset (Moonless Night)
Best Script	Yongjian Sun (Fake Tattoos)
Best Short Film	Mrs. Wang
Best Supporting Actress	Xinyu Wang (The Master of Lion Dance)
Best Supporting Actor	Mingyi Yang (Lost in Apocalypse)
Best Producer	Wenshuang Xu (How Far Is Tomorrow)
People's Choice	The Master of Lion Dance
Best Actress	Dorothée Berryman (Background Check)
Best Actor	Mathew Knowles (Poppies)
Best Director	Marc-André Lavoie (Background Check)
Best Film	Zhang Yimou (Shadow)

=== 2017 ===
Awards	Recipients
Best Director	Teng Junjie
Best Feature Film	Seventy-seven Days
Best Documentary Film	fr:Un Américain au Québec
Best Short Film	Le plateau
Best Actress	Jiang Yiyan
Best Actor	Aubert Pallascio
Best Cinematography	Final Battle in Town
Best Script	Trusting Love
Best Special Effects	Secrets of the Flowers
People's Choice	Broken Badges
Best Technology	The Plume
Best Supporting Actor	Guorong Zhang
Best Supporting Actress	Funglin Yao
Best TV Documentary	The Century Silk Road
Best TV Series	The First Half of My Life
Best Script Competition	Jiangling Li

=== 2016 ===
Awards	Recipients
Best Actress	Ding Liuyuan
Best Actor	Sasha Samar
Best Supporting Actress	Yan Zhang
Best Supporting Actor	Yixiang Li
Best Director	Zhen Ding, Yinann Ding
Best Film	Best the Streets
Best Short Film	Pain in Silence
Best Documentary Film	Once Upon a Time in Bussière's Garden
People's Choice	The Promised One
Best Special Effects	Brothers
Best Technology	Lighting Up
Best Script	Last Shot (film)
Best Cinematography	Transmigration (film)

== Media coverage ==
The Canada China International Film Festival (CCIFF) has been featured in many national and international news outlets such as MTL Blog, The Montreal Times Newswire, The Hollywood Reporter, Global News,Timeout Market, CBC Radio, Radio Canada, and Cult MTL.
