= Jacques Languirand =

Canadian radio host, writer, actor and director (1931–2018)

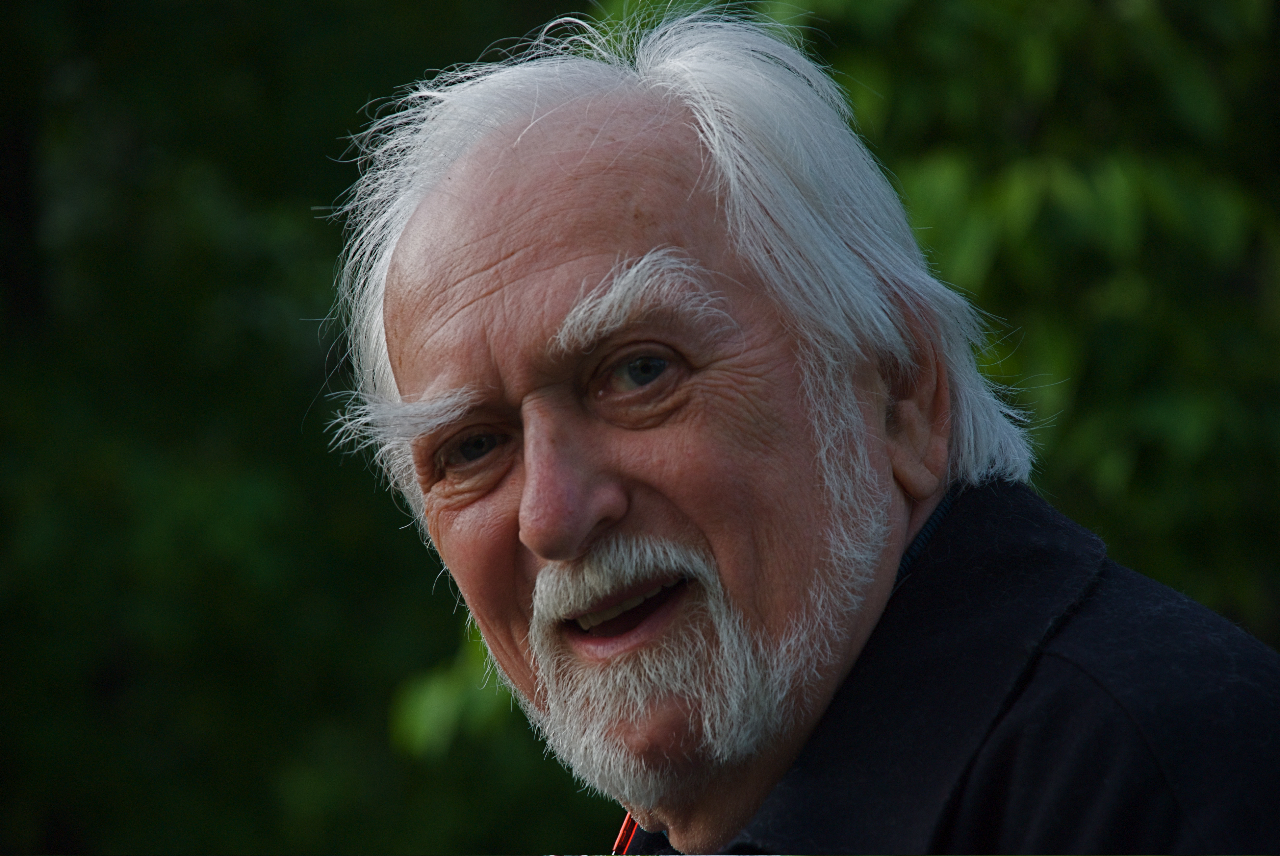
- Jacques Languirand in 2009
- Born: May 1, 1931; Montreal, Quebec, Canada
- Died: January 26, 2018 (aged 86); Montreal, Quebec, Canada
- Occupation: Communicator
- Years active: 1949–2018

Jacques Languirand, OC (May 1, 1931 – January 26, 2018) was a Canadian radio host, writer, actor and director.

He hosted the same radio show, Par 4 chemins on Radio-Canada, for 42 years. He was awarded the C.M. (Member of the Order of Canada) on December 21, 1987, and the O.C. (Officer of the Order of Canada) on May 8, 2003, for his services to communications in Canada.

In 2012, audiences saw him as the lead actor of Martin Villeneuve's Mars et Avril, a science fiction film based on the graphic novels of the same name.

He was the father of Pascal Languirand, best known as the leader and founder of synthpop band Trans-X.

== Awards ==
- 1956: Sir Barry Jackson Award for Les Insolites
- 1956: Laflèche Award for Le Dictionnaire insolite
- 1962: Governor General's Award for Les Insolites and Les Violons de l’automne
- 1968: Commonwealth Arts Festival Award for Klondyke
- 1978: The Librarian Award for La Voie initiatique
- 1987: Member of the Order of Canada
- 1998: Award from Quebec's Philosophers Company
- 1998: Year's best communicator from The International Association of Communication Professionals
- 2001: Special Jury's Award of the Onassis Foundation for Faust et les radicaux libres.
- 2002: Honoris Causa Doctorate from McGill University
- 2003: Officer of the Order of Canada
- 2004: Knight of National Order of Quebec
- 2004: Georges-Émile-Lapalme Award for exceptional use of the French language
- 2006: 31st member of the Phoenix Circle for the environnement
- 2006: Governor General's Performing Arts Award, Canada's highest honour in the performing arts
- 2008: Knight of the Pléiade Order, Francophonie Order and Dialogue of cultures
- 2009: Member of the Monique-Fitz-back Circle

== Bibliography ==
=== Theatre plays ===
- 1956: Les Insolites
- 1956: Le Roi ivre
- 1957: Les Grands Départs
- 1957: Le Gibet
- 1958: Diogène
- 1960: Les Violons de l'automne
- 1962: Les Cloisons
- 1963: Klondyke
- 1966-1970: Man Inc.
- 2001: Faust et les radicaux libres
- 2012: Feedback

=== Opera ===
- 1966: Louis Riel

=== Essays ===
- 1960: J'ai découvert Tahiti et les îles du bonheur
- 1962: Le Dictionnaire insolite
- 1972: De McLuhan à Pythagore
- 1978: La Voie initiatique : le sens caché de la vie
- 1979: Vivre sa vie (adapted from the TV series)
- 1980: Mater materia
- 1981: Vivre ici maintenant (adapted from the TV series)
- 1984: Réincarnation et karma (in collaboration with Placide Gaboury)
- 1987: Prévenir le burn-out (also published under the title Vaincre le mal-être by Albin Michel)
- 1989: A comme Aubergine : 108 recettes sans viande (in collaboration with Yolande Languirand)
- 1989-1991: Par 4 chemins (adapted from the radio show)
- 1998: Les Voyages de Languirand ou le journal de Prospéro
- 2001: Presque tout Languirand – Théâtre
- 2008: Le Dieu cosmique : À la recherche du Dieu d'Einstein (in collaboration with Jean Proulx)
- 2009: L’héritage spirituel amérindien. Le grand mystère (in collaboration with Jean Proulx)

=== Novel ===
- 1963: Tout compte fait

== Filmography ==
- 1968: Kid Sentiment
- 1994: A Hero's Life (La Vie d'un héros) ... Monsieur le juge
- 1997: J'en suis! ... Igor de Lonsdale
- 1998: Le Lépidoptère (short film) ... Voice On The Radio (voice)
- 1999: The Big Snake of the World (Le Grand serpent du monde)
- 2002: Alice's Odyssey ... Père Noël
- 2007: La chambre bleue (short film) ... Narrator (voice)
- 2012: Mars and April (Mars et Avril) ... Jacob Obus

== Television ==
- 1957: Le Colombier (TV series) ... Le mari de Grandmont
- 1997-2000: La Boîte à Lunch ... Grand-papa
- 2004-2007: Le Rebut Global ... Le philosophe
- 2011-2012: "Les Repères de Languirand" ... Host
