= The Far Side of the Moon (play) =

Play by Robert Lepage

- Original language: French
- Written by: Robert Lepage
- Music by: Laurie Anderson

Premiere
- Date: 29 February 2000
- Place: Théâtre du Trident; Quebec City, Canada

The Far Side of the Moon (French: La Face cachée de la Lune) is a 2000 play by Quebec playwright Robert Lepage. Written in collaboration with Adam Nashman and Peder Bjurman, it features an original score by Laurie Anderson and marionettes by Pierre Robitaille and Sylvie Courbron. It was staged in many cities around the world to wide acclaim, and won several awards. Lepage wrote, directed and starred in a 2003 film adaptation.

== Awards ==
- Paul Hébert Award for Best Actor (2001)
- Time Out Award for Best Play (2001)
- Evening Standard Theatre Awards for Best Play (2001)
- Barclays Theatre Awards for Best Touring Production (2001)
- Critics' Circle Theatre Award for Best Director (2001)
- Golden Mask Festival award for Best Foreign Production (2007)
