= Appiness =

Canadian Film

- Directed by: Eli Batalion
- Written by: Eli Batalion
- Produced by: Eli Batalion
- Starring: Eli Batalion; Varun Saranga; Amber Goldfarb; Jayne Heitmeyer; Larry Day
- Cinematography: Benoit Beaulieu
- Edited by: Mark Bendit
- Music by: Joe Barrucco, Eli Batalion
- Distributed by: Gravitas Ventures
- Release dates: September 10, 2018 (Festival); January 28, 2020 (Public)
- Running time: 82 minutes
- Country: Canada
- Language: English

Appiness is a Canadian comedy film written, directed and produced by Eli Batalion. The film stars Eli Batalion as Eric Newman, who, upon being laid off from his stuffy corporate job, starts to pursue tech entrepreneurial start-up dreams with long-lost high school friend Raj Patel (Varun Saranga). The film premiered on the festival circuit in 2018, with its domestic premiere at the Rendez-vous Québec Cinéma in 2019.

Appiness was released by distributor Gravitas Ventures in early 2020.

== Cast ==
- Eli Batalion as Eric
- Varun Saranga as Raj
- Amber Goldfarb as Jeanine
- Kathleen Stavert as Nila
- Derek Johns as Jack
- Jayne Heitmeyer as Sierra
- Mike Paterson as Schlein
- Larry Day as Jeffrey
- Daniel Brochu as Chet

== Awards ==
| Year | Award | Category | Recipient(s) and nominee(s) | Result |
|---|---|---|---|---|
| 2018 | Calcutta International Cult Film Festival | Debut Filmmaker | Eli Batalion | Won |
| 2019 | Canada China International Film Festival | Best Actress | Amber Goldfarb | Won |
