= August 32nd on Earth =

1998 film

- Theatrical release poster
- Directed by: Denis Villeneuve
- Written by: Denis Villeneuve
- Produced by: Roger Frappier
- Starring: Pascale Bussières; Alexis Martin
- Cinematography: André Turpin
- Edited by: Sophie Leblond
- Release date: 17 September 1998
- Running time: 88 minutes
- Country: Canada
- Languages: French; English

August 32nd on Earth (French: Un 32 août sur terre, and also known as 32nd Day of August on Earth) is a 1998 Canadian drama film directed and written by Denis Villeneuve, in his feature film directorial debut, and produced by Roger Frappier. It was screened in the Un Certain Regard section at the 1998 Cannes Film Festival. Alexis Martin won the Prix Jutra for Best Actor. The film was selected as the Canadian entry for the Best Foreign Language Film at the 71st Academy Awards, but was not nominated.

== Premise ==
In the aftermath of a highway mishap, photo model Simone (Pascale Bussières) decides that conceiving a baby with her best friend Philippe (Alexis Martin) is the only way to give her vacant life some meaning. Philippe reluctantly agrees with the proviso that they conceive in a desert.

== Cast ==
- Paule Baillargeon as Doctor in hospital
- Emmanuel Bilodeau as Philippe's best friend
- Pascale Bussières as Simone Prévost
- R. Craig Costin as Hired car clerk
- Joanne Côté as Monica
- Frédéric Desager as Stéphane
- Estelle Esse as Leather shop clerk
- Lee C. Fobert as Car driver – Salt Lake City
- Venelina Ghiaourov as Nurse
- Richard S. Hamilton as Taxi driver
- Marc Jeanty as Janvier
- Alexis Martin as Philippe
- Évelyne Rompré as Juliette
- Ivan Smith as Doctor
- Serge Thériault as Car driver
- Jim Levesque as Customer in café
- Raoul Trujillo as Thom (uncredited)

== Reception ==
Metacritic assigned the film a weighted average score of 61 out of 100, based on 5 critics, indicating "generally favorable reviews".

Brendan Kelly of Variety praised the film's visuals, the lead performances, the "sparing but effective" use of musical tracks by Quebec icons Robert Charlebois and Jean Leloup, but Kelly criticized the "thin" storyline, saying it "simply doesn't have the goods to keep audiences interested over the long-haul." Time Out equally praised the striking visuals, but called the film "an intriguing but only partly successful oddity [...] never really adding up to very much at all." Reelfilm.com gave the film two out of four stars, saying it was "a sporadically intriguing yet mostly self-indulgent first film from a director who would go onto much better things."

== See also ==
- List of submissions to the 71st Academy Awards for Best Foreign Language Film
- List of Canadian submissions for the Academy Award for Best Foreign Language Film
