= Far Side of the Moon (film) =

2003 film

- DVD cover
- Directed by: Robert Lepage
- Written by: Robert Lepage
- Produced by: Bob Krupinski; Mario St-Laurent
- Starring: Robert Lepage; Anne-Marie Cadieux; Marco Poulin; Céline Bonnier; Lorraine Côté
- Cinematography: Ronald Plante
- Edited by: Philippe Gagnon
- Music by: Benoît Jutras
- Distributed by: Alliance Atlantis
- Release date: 2003
- Running time: 105 minutes
- Country: Canada
- Language: French

Far Side of the Moon (French: La Face cachée de la lune) is a 2003 Canadian drama film, directed by Robert Lepage. It is based on Lepage's eponymous play, which premiered in 2000.

Set in the context of the USSR-United States Space Race of the 1960s, the film centres on two brothers, both played by Lepage, who are struggling to cope with the recent death by suicide of their mother (Anne-Marie Cadieux). Philippe, the older brother, is a doctoral student in astronomy who buries his feelings in his academic pursuits, while André, the younger brother, is a gay television weatherman who has always had a happier and easier path through life but finds himself struggling.

The film received four Genie Award nominations at the 24th Genie Awards in 2004: Best Picture (Bob Krupinski and Mario St-Laurent), Best Director (Lepage), Best Actor (Lepage) and Best Adapted Screenplay (Lepage). Lepage won the award for Best Adapted Screenplay.

The film was Canada's official submission for the Academy Award for Best Foreign Language Film for the 77th Academy Awards, but was not nominated.

== Cast ==
- Robert Lepage – Philippe / André
- Anne-Marie Cadieux – La mère
- Marco Poulin – Carl
- Céline Bonnier – Nathalie
- Fabrice Mongeau – Philippe at age 15
- Raphaël Dury – Philippe at age 7
- Étienne Bouchard-Dauphin – André at age 8
- Gregory Hlady – Interpreter
- Yves Amyot – Bartender
- Richard Fréchette – Doctor
- Érika Gagnon – Philippe's Supervisor
- Sergei Priselkov – Alexei Leonov (as Sergei Prisselkov)
- Sophie Faucher – Presenter
- Lorraine Côté – Marie-Madeleine Bonsecours
- Oleg Belkin – Bodyguard
- Sylvain Massé – Security Guard
- Myriam LeBlanc – Hotel receptionist
- Olivier Bolvin St-Jean – Nathalie as a child
- Véronique Aubut – Nurse
- Alexandre Sadeisky – Concierge
- Agnieszka Baran – Stewardess
- Brigitte Bilodeau – Cosmetician

== Reception ==
Far Side of the Moon has an approval rating of 81% on review aggregator website Rotten Tomatoes, based on 21 reviews, and an average rating of 7/10. Metacritic assigned the film a weighted average score of 76 out of 100, based on 9 critics, indicating "generally favorable reviews".

== See also ==
- List of submissions to the 77th Academy Awards for Best Foreign Language Film
- List of Canadian submissions for the Academy Award for Best Foreign Language Film
