= Anne-Marie Cadieux =

Canadian actress and director

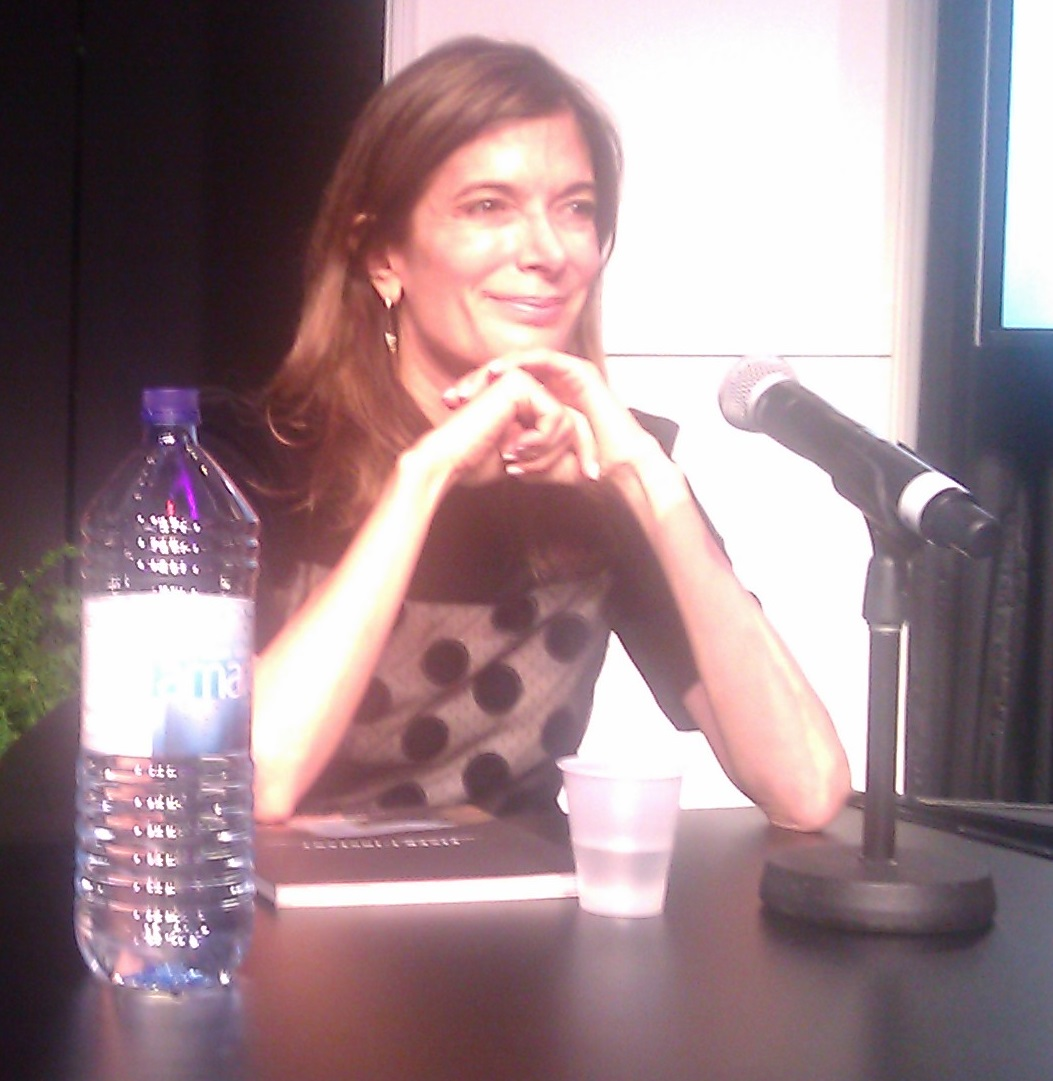
- Born: September 23, 1963 (age 62); Montreal, Quebec
- Occupation: actress
- Years active: 1982–present
- Awards: Jutra Award for Best Supporting Actress (1999)

Anne-Marie Cadieux (born September 23, 1963) is a Canadian actress, film director and screenwriter. She has won a Jutra Award for Best Supporting Actress for her role in Streetheart (Le Cœur au poing) and in 2008 was nominated for a Genie Award for Best Performance by an Actress in a Leading Role for her role in You (Toi).

== Early life ==
Cadieux received her Bachelor of Arts in theatre from the University of Ottawa. She first appeared on stage in 1983 in Les Belles-Sœurs directed by Andre Brassard. Brassard would direct Cadieux again in L'Année de la grosse tempête in 1984 and Genet's Les Bonnes in 1985.

== Career ==
Anne-Marie Cadieux has stood out in Quebec and internationally for several years thanks to an active career in theatre, film and television. Onstage, she has worked with some of our most important directors, including Robert Lepage, Brigitte Haentjens, Denis Marleau, Serge Denoncourt, Dominic Champagne, Lorraine Pintal, and André Brassard, in addition to having held some of the greatest roles in the classical and contemporary repertoire. A popular actress with audiences and critics alike, Anne-Marie is known for her audacity, versatility and intensity, gracefully transitioning from drama to comedy. The prestigious honors she has received over the years illustrate her talent and commitment to the Quebec art scene.

In 2022, Cadieux played in Martin Villeneuve's The 12 Tasks of Imelda (Les 12 travaux d'Imelda), co-starring playwright Robert Lepage and actress-signer Ginette Reno, in which she plays Martin and Denis Villeneuve's aunt Diane.

== Accomplishments ==
- Nominated for Best Supporting Actress Genie for "Le Confessionnal" (1995)
- Won Best Supporting Actress Jutra for her role as a carping sister in "Le coeur au poing" (1998)
- Nominated for Best Actress Genie as a thespian caught in terrorist activities in "Nô" (1998)

== Selected filmography ==
Year	Title	Role	Notes
1995	The Confessional (Le Confessionnal)	Manon	
1998	Nô	Sophie Maltais	
1998	Streetheart (Le cœur au poing)	Paulette	
1999	Four Days	Feather	
2004	TV Dinner...Burp!		
2005	Maman Last Call		
2006	The Genius of Crime (Le Génie du crime)	Shirley	
2006	Black Eyed Dog	Roxanne	
2007	You (Toi)		
2010	Good Neighbours	Valérie	
2013	An Extraordinary Person (Quelqu'un d'extraordinaire)		
2015	Endorphine	hypnotherapist	
2015	Buddha's Little Finger	Timurovna	
2016	9 (9, le film)	Annabelle	Segment "Abus"
2020	La Maison-Bleue	Mirelle	Series regular
2022	The 12 Tasks of Imelda (Les 12 travaux d'Imelda)	Diane	
2023	Solo	Claire	
2023	My Mother's Men (Les Hommes de ma mère)	Anne	
