= Nô (film) =

- Directed by: Robert Lepage
- Written by: Robert Lepage; André Morency
- Produced by: Bruno Jobin
- Starring: Anne-Marie Cadieux; Marie Gignac; Richard Fréchette; Marie Brassard; Alexis Martin; Jean Leloup
- Cinematography: Pierre Mignot
- Edited by: Aube Foglia
- Music by: Michel F. Côté; Bernard Falaise
- Distributed by: Alliance Atlantis; New Yorker Films
- Release date: 25 September 1998
- Running time: 85 min.
- Country: Canada
- Language: French

Nô is a 1998 Canadian film by director Robert Lepage. It was based on one segment in Lepage's play Seven Streams of the River Ota.

The title is a pun which reflects the film's dramatic structure, linking the 1980 Quebec referendum (in which the "no" won) to Japanese Nō theatre.

== Plot ==
The film is set in 1970 at the height of the FLQ bombings in Montreal, known as the October Crisis. During the Crisis, Prime Minister Pierre Elliot Trudeau instituted the War Measures Act, which resulted in martial law on the streets of Montreal. The central character, Sophie (Anne-Marie Cadieux), is an actress working in Osaka (Japan) at Expo '70, while her boyfriend, Michel (Alexis Martin), is an FLQ sympathizer. Sophie discovers that she is pregnant and phones Michel, but before she can tell him, two FLQ friends suddenly turn up at his apartment looking for a place to hide, and Michel has to hang up. Sophie, who is unaware of the crises happening in Montreal, is upset by Michel apparently not wanting to talk to her, and isn't even sure if he is the father. She has to decide whether to stay and get an abortion in Japan, where abortion is legal, or keep the baby and return to Montreal the next day as planned. Meanwhile, she has to avoid the advances of fellow actor François-Xavier (Éric Bernier) and survive a dinner with Canadian ambassador Walter (Richard Fréchette) and his difficult wife Patricia (Marie Gignac). Sophie's interpreter friend Hanako (Marie Brassard), a Japanese woman blinded by the atomic bomb in Hiroshima, is preparing to move to Vancouver (British Columbia) with her Canadian interpreter boyfriend. In the meantime, in Montreal, Michel's two friends are plotting to set off a bomb, but they end up blowing up Michel's apartment by mistake.
