= Streetheart (film) =

- French: Le cœur au poing
- Directed by: Charles Binamé
- Written by: Charles Binamé; Monique Proulx
- Produced by: Lorraine Richard
- Starring: Pascale Montpetit; Anne-Marie Cadieux
- Cinematography: Pierre Gill
- Edited by: Claude Palardy
- Music by: Yves Desrosiers; Richard Grégoire
- Production company: Canadian Government
- Distributed by: France Film
- Release date: September 14, 1998 (Toronto Film Festival)
- Running time: 101 min.
- Country: Canada
- Language: French

Streetheart (French: Le cœur au poing) is a 1998 film that was awarded the Crystal Globe at the Karlovy Vary International Film Festival in 1998. It was directed by French Canadian director Charles Binamé.

== Cast ==
- Pascale Montpetit as Louise
- Guy Nadon as Julien
- Anne-Marie Cadieux as Paulette
- Guylaine Tremblay as Marlene
- Rita Lafontaine as Rita
- Luc Proulx as Ben Miracle
- Venelina Ghiaourov
- Hubert Loiselle as Le sans-abri
- Jean-Rene Ouellet
- Raymond Belisle
- Marc Gélinas
- Georges Brossard
- Linda Sorgini
- Normand Levesque
- Marc Labreche as Le camionneur
- Micheline Lanctôt
- Dominique Levesque as Frédéric
- Stéphane Breton as Max
- Luc Picard as Lézard
- Pascale Bussières as Marianne

== Awards ==
- 1998 Pascale Montpetit won Best Actress at the Jutra Awards
- 1998 Pascale Montpetit won Best Actress at the Mons International Festival of Love Films
- 1998 Anne-Marie Cadieux won Best Supporting Actress at the Jutra Awards
- 1998 Charles Binamé won Best Director at the 33rd Karlovy Vary International Film Festival
- 1998 The film won the Crystal Globe at the 33rd Karlovy Vary International Film Festival
- 1998 Charles Binamé and Monique Proulx won Best Canadian Screenplay at the Vancouver International Film Festival
