= Martin Villeneuve =

Canadian film director, producer and screenwriter

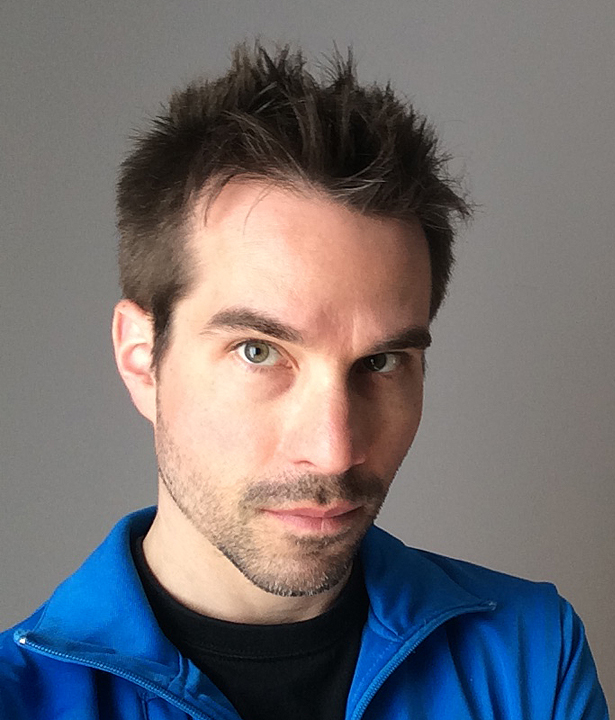
- Filmmaker Martin Villeneuve in April 2015
- Born: Bécancour, Quebec, Canada
- Education: Université du Québec à Montréal
- Occupations: Screenwriter; film producer; film director; actor; art director; writer
- Years active: 2001–present
- Relatives: Denis Villeneuve (brother)
- Awards: Best Actor at Dieppe's Canadian Film Festival (France); Best Director at the Canada China International Film Festival; Nominated for Best Adapted Screenplay at the Canadian Screen Awards; Imaging the Future Award at Neuchâtel International Film Festival; Honorable Mention at the Boston Sci-Fi Film Festival
- Website: www.bulbapp.com/MartinVilleneuve

Martin Villeneuve (French: [maʁtɛ̃ vilnœv]) is a Canadian screenwriter, producer, director, actor, and art director. He was nominated at the Canadian Screen Award (formerly Genie Award) in 2013 for Best Adapted Screenplay, for Mars et Avril, his feature film debut. He is also known for The 12 Tasks of Imelda, his second feature film released in 2022, in which he portrays his own grandmother, and for his animated series Red Ketchup which premiered in 2023. Villeneuve previously worked for Cirque du Soleil as an artistic director for commercials and films.

== Early life ==
He studied Film Production at Concordia University and Graphic Design at Université du Québec à Montréal. In 2002, he received an award from the commercial creativity agency Sid Lee for the quality of his portfolio. In the years that followed, he worked as an artistic director with this agency and created advertising campaigns for several Cirque du Soleil shows, including Zumanity, KÀ and Corteo. He found the name for these three shows, as well as for Guy Laliberté's One Drop Foundation. When the agency (formerly known as Diesel) changed its name in 2006, Villeneuve had the idea for the anagram Sid Lee. He also directed TV commercials for Cirque du Soleil, in addition to music videos and documentary shorts.

== Career ==
Villeneuve began his career as a writer and graphic artist in 2002. He has created the comic book La voix du tonnerre (Les 400 coups, 2004), as well as the two graphic novels Mars et Avril (Sid Lee & la Pastèque, 2002-2006). In 2012, the feature film adaptation of Mars et Avril which Villeneuve wrote, directed and produced, was brought to the silver screen and released in Canada in Fall 2012. Mars et Avril toured in over 20 international festivals, starting with a world premiere at the 47th Karlovy Vary International Film Festival, Czech Republic, and received 10 nominations. Martin Villeneuve was nominated for Best Adapted Screenplay at the 2013 Canadian Screen Awards, and he also won an Imaging the Future Award at the Neuchâtel International Fantasy Film Festival in Switzerland.

On February 27, 2013, Villeneuve gave a TED Talk about Mars et Avril. This event took place in Long Beach, California. Prior to his talk, the opening sequence of the movie was shown, as well as a three minutes overview of the steps leading from the green screen to the final images. Villeneuve's talk, "How I made an impossible film," was released on TED.com on June 7, 2013, and a month later was added to TED's movie magic list, notably featuring directors James Cameron and J. J. Abrams. His talk has been subtitled in 33 languages and viewed more than a million times. Since then, Mars et Avril has been sold to the U.S. and is available online.

In 2014, Villeneuve made his acting debut in his short comedy film Imelda, in the role of his paternal grandmother, for which he won three awards, including the Union des Artistes' Best Actor Award at the 12th Prends ça court ! Gala (2015).

In 2016–2017, he directed the first episodes of the second season of Real Detective for Investigation Discovery Channel and Netflix.

On August 3, 2020, a 14-minute documentary about Martin Villeneuve was released online. Directed by Jean Benoit, it features interviews with stage director Robert Lepage, illustrator François Schuiten, and filmmaker Denis Villeneuve.

Martin Villeneuve shot two sequels to his short film Imelda, both released in fall 2020. Imelda 2: The Notary had its world premiere and opened the Quebec City Film Festival on September 16, 2020, and won the Cinémental Award for Best Canadian Short Film 2020. Imelda 3: Simone had its world premiere and opened the Festival du cinéma international en Abitibi-Témiscamingue on October 31, 2020, in front of a real audience despite the Covid crisis.

He gave a one-hour storytelling masterclass for Goalcast, which went live on January 7, 2021.

Villeneuve's second feature film, The 12 Tasks of Imelda, which he wrote, directed, produced and starred in, had its world premiere at the Quebec City Film Festival on September 9, 2022, before going into commercial release in 29 theaters across Quebec on October 28, 2022. It was also screened at the 2022 Whistler Film Festival, where it won the award for Best Editing in a Borsos Competition film. On March 26, 2023, Villeneuve won the Best Actor award at Dieppe's Canadian Film Festival, France, for his role of Imelda, and on August 31, 2023, he won the Best Director award at the Canada China International Film Festival.

In 2023, Martin Villeneuve directed Red Ketchup, based on Quebec's cult graphic novels. Produced by Sphere Animation, this 20-episode animated series aired on Adult Swim in English and on Télétoon la nuit in French. Villeneuve also lent his voice to the character of Bill Bélisle in the French version of the show, which held the top spot on Télétoon la nuit and was part of Bubbleblabber's "Top 10 Adult Animated TV Series For 2023".

In March 2024, he was President of the Jury at Dieppe's Canadian Film Festival, in France.

On May 31, 2024, he paid tribute to his brother Denis Villeneuve, recipient of the Icon Award at the 12th Canadian Screen Awards.

On June 15, 2024, he wrote a manifesto in La Presse regarding the reform of Quebec's public financing system in cinema.

In 2026, he releases Old Crow, a "docu-sical" about Quebec trailblazer Louise Forestier, premiering at the Rhode Island International Film Festival, and at Montreal's CINEMANIA. The film has won the Gran Ganador for Best Professional Film at CINEPHONE in Barcelona, as well as a Highly Commended Award at SF3 – Smartphone Film Festival in Sydney, two festivals dedicated to movies shot with an iPhone.

Martin Villeneuve's most recent feature film is Imelda Strikes Back, a sequel to The 12 Tasks of Imelda starring Benoît Brière, Robert Lepage, Michel Barrette, Anne-Marie Cadieux, Martin Dubreuil, Roberto Zorfini and Louise Forestier, with Villeneuve reprising the title role. The movie had its world premiere in official competition at the Festival du cinéma international en Abitibi-Témiscamingue on October 31, 2026, and opened the CINÉFRANCO film festival in Toronto on November 6, 2026. It is scheduled to have its U.S. premiere at the LA Comedy Film Festival on December 5, 2026, ahead of its theatrical release in Quebec on March 26, 2027.

== Personal life ==
Martin Villeneuve is the youngest of four siblings, and the brother of filmmaker Denis Villeneuve.

== Selected bibliography ==
- Mars et Avril, tome 2 : À la poursuite du fantasme, photo-novel, photography by Yanick Macdonald, Éd. Diesel & la Pastèque, 2006
- La voix du tonnerre, comic book, illustrations by Daniel Svatek, Éd. Les 400 coups, 2004
- Mars et Avril, tome 1, photo-novel, photography by Yanick Macdonald, Éd. Les 400 coups, 2002 (revised version published by Diesel & la Pastèque in 2006)

== Selected filmography ==
- 2026: Old Crow (documentary)
- 2023: Red Ketchup (animated TV series, 20 episodes)
- 2022: The 12 Tasks of Imelda (Les 12 travaux d'Imelda) (feature)
- 2021: The Crab: Prelude to Aquarica (short)
- 2020: Imelda 3: Simone (short)
- 2020: Imelda 2: The Notary (short)
- 2020: Once Upon A Time Martin Villeneuve (documentary short directed by Jean Benoit, featuring interviews with stage director Robert Lepage, illustrator François Schuiten and filmmaker Denis Villeneuve)
- 2020: More of the World (music video)
- 2019: It's Alive! (short)
- 2016–2017: Real Detective, Season 2 (TV series, 2 episodes)
- 2014: Imelda (short)
- 2013: Martin Villeneuve: How I made an impossible film (TED Talks)
- 2013: The Mars & Avril Experience (Making of)
- 2012: Mars et Avril / Mars and April (feature)
- 2011: Two Immortals: Prelude to Mars and April (short)
- 2003–2013: Cirque du Soleil – Advertising & documentary shorts
- 2002: Jouisseland by Jean Leloup (music video)
- 2000: Chrysanthème (short)

== Awards and mentions ==
- 2026: Old Crow wins the Gran Ganador for Best Professional Film at CINEPHONE in Barcelona, as well as a Highly Commended Award at SF3 – Smartphone Film Festival in Sydney, two festivals dedicated to movies shot with an iPhone.
- 2024: Nominated for Best Animated Series at the Gémeaux Awards and nominated for Best Editing at the 12th Canadian Screen Awards for Red Ketchup.
- 2023: Red Ketchup is listed in Bubbleblabber's "Top 10" of the world's best adult animated series.
- 2023: Martin Villeneuve won the Best Director award at the Canada China International Film Festival for The 12 Tasks of Imelda.
- 2023: Martin Villeneuve won the Best Actor award at the Festival du Film Canadien de Dieppe, France, for his role of Imelda in The 12 Tasks of Imelda.
- 2022: The 12 Tasks of Imelda won the award for Best Editing in a Borsos Competition film at the 2022 Whistler Film Festival.
- 2020: Martin Villeneuve won the Cinémental Award for Best Canadian Short Film 2020 for Imelda 2: The Notary, ex æquo with Scars by Alex Anna.
- 2015: Martin Villeneuve won the Union des Artistes' Best Actor Award at the 12th Prends ça court ! Gala for his role in Imelda, in which he plays his own grandmother.
- 2014: Imelda won Quebec's Best Short Film Award at Festival Images en vues, as well as a Special Mention from the jury in the category Best Canadian Short Film at the FICFA.
- 2013: Martin Villeneuve gave a TED Talk about Mars et Avril – Quebec's first science fiction film – at TED2013, thereby becoming the first (and so far the only) French Canadian speaker invited to this prestigious event that took place in Long Beach, California.
- 2013: Mars et Avril received nine nominations in Canada (four at the Canadian Screen Awards and five at the Jutra), including one for best adapted screenplay. The film's music, composed by Benoît Charest, won the Felix in the category "Album of the year – original soundtrack" at the ADISQ Gala.
- 2012–2013: Mars et Avril was screened in more than twenty international film festivals among the most prestigious (Karlovy Vary, Mill Valley, FNC Montreal, Mumbai, Whistler, Brussels International Fantastic Film Festival, Sci-Fi London, etc.), and won an Imaging the Future Award at the Neuchâtel International Fantasy Film Festival in Switzerland as well as an honorable mention at the Boston Science Fiction Film Festival for "incredible post-production work."
- 2011: Applied Arts Award, category "Advertising Photography – Series" for the exhibition "Dieu(X) Modes d'emploi," at the Musée de la civilisation de Québec.
- 2011: Grafika Award, category "Affiche culturelle – série" for the exhibition "Dieu(X) Modes d'emploi," at the Musée de la civilisation de Québec.
- 2008: We Love Books: A World Tour | The Best in Independent Publishing and Graphic Design: Mars et Avril volumes 1 & 2.
- 2008: Gutenberg Award, category "Books": Mars et Avril volume 2.
- 2007: Nominee, Lux Award, category "Books": Mars et Avril volume 2.
- 2006: Alcuin Society Book Design Awards, category "Prose Illustrated": Mars et Avril volume 2.
- 2004: Nominee, Bédélys Award: La voix du tonnerre.
- 2003: Nominee, Grafika Award, category "Books": Mars et Avril volume 1.
- 2002: Honorable mention, Alcuin Society Book Design Awards, category "Pictorial": Mars et Avril volume 1.
- 2002: UQAM-Diesel Award for the quality of the portfolio.
- 2002: He designed film posters, most notoriously the one for Québec-Montréal showing the pictograph of a moose screwing a car, which earned him the Travelling Laurentides Award for best launching campaign.
- 2001: Nominee, Création Vidéo Award, Clermont-Ferrand Vidéo Formes Festival (France): Chrysanthème (short).
