= Robert Lepage =

Canadian writer, actor, director

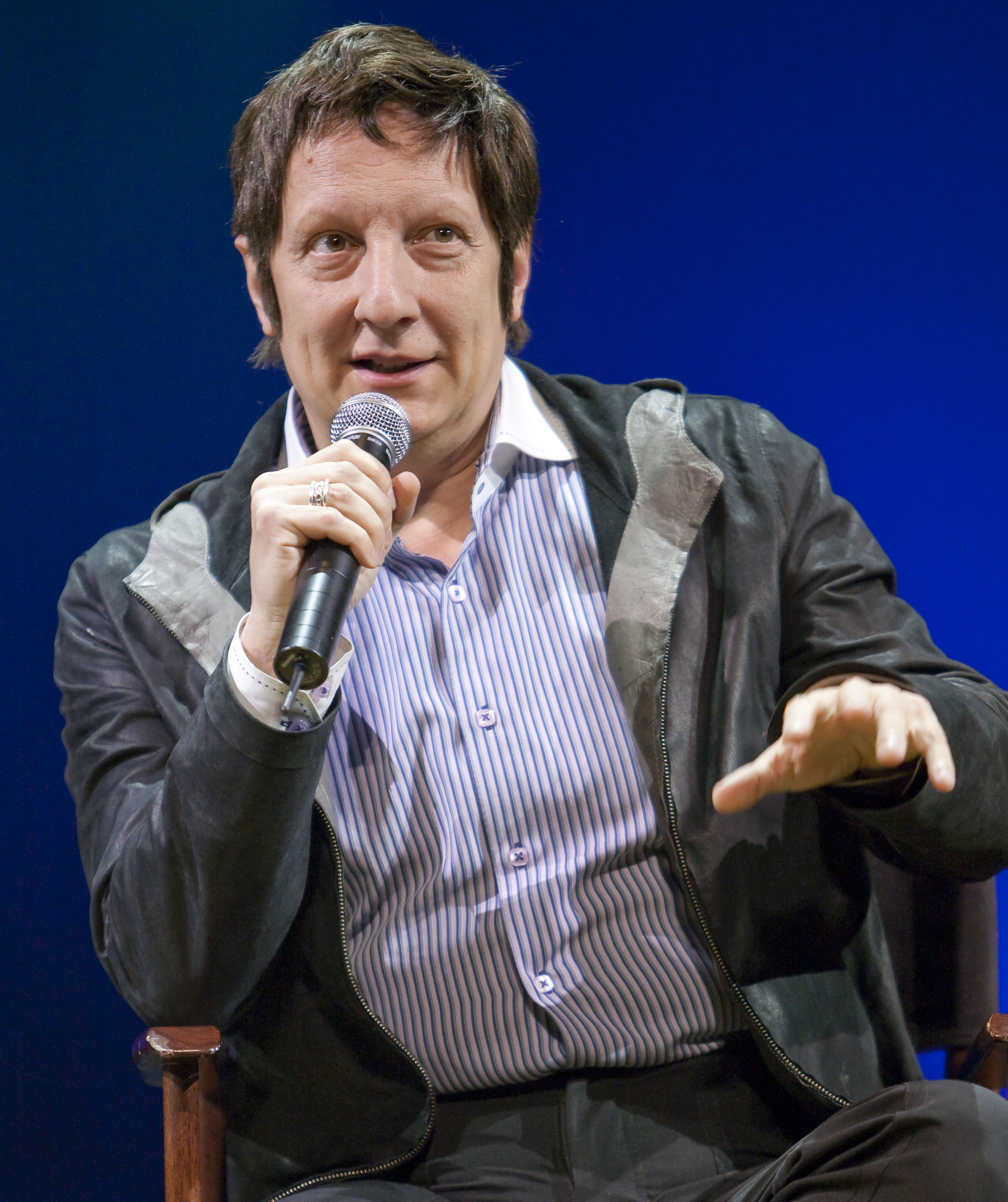
- Lepage at the European première of Cirque du Soleil's Totem in Amsterdam, October 2010
- Born: December 12, 1957 (age 68)
- Occupations: Film director Actor; Screenwriter
- Years active: 1982–present
- Awards: Glenn Gould Prize

Robert Lepage CC OQ (born December 12, 1957) is a Canadian playwright, actor, film director, and stage director. He is known for his multidisciplinary performance and production company called Ex Machina, which he founded in 1994 in Quebec City.

== Early life ==
Lepage was raised modestly in the Montcalm neighbourhood of Quebec City. At age five, he was diagnosed with a rare form of alopecia, which caused complete hair loss over his whole body. He also struggled with clinical depression in his teens as he came to terms with being gay.

Between 1975 and 1977, he studied acting at Quebec City's Conservatoire de Quebec. He subsequently participated in workshops at Alain Knapp's theatre school in Paris, France in 1998.

== Theatrical career ==
After coming back to Quebec City, Lepage wrote, directed and played in a few independent productions and joined Théâtre Repère in 1980. With that company, he created Circulations (1984), which was presented across Canada and won an award as best Canadian production during La Quinzaine Internationale de Théâtre de Québec. The following year, he created The Dragons' Trilogy and immediately received international recognition. Vinci (1986), Polygraphe (1987–1990) and Tectonic Plates (1988–1990) followed and were also toured around the world.

Lepage was the artistic director of the National Arts Centre's Théâtre français in Ottawa from 1989 to 1993, and continued to stage plays. His productions of Needles and Opium, Coriolanus, Macbeth, The Tempest and A Midsummer Night's Dream were all created in that period.

Donald Winkler's 1992 documentary film Breaking a Leg: Robert Lepage and the Echo Project profiled the creative process behind Lepage's work on Echo, a 1989 production which was Lepage's first significant popular and critical failure as a director.

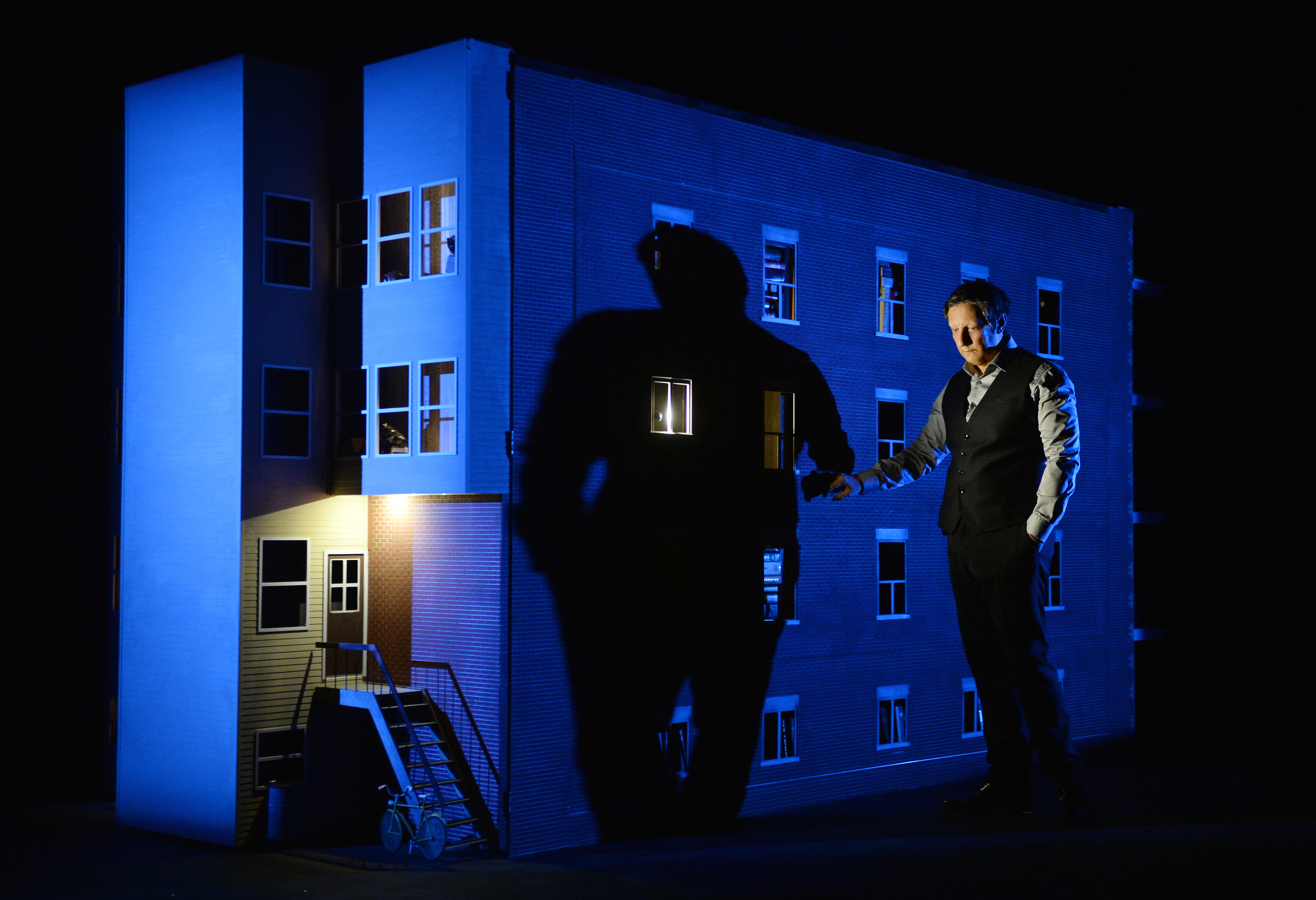
Robert Lepage's 887 (Photo courtesy of Ex Machina)

In 1994, Lepage founded Ex Machina, a multidisciplinary production company, for which he is artistic director. Lepage and Ex Machina have toured a number of productions internationally to critical and popular acclaim, including The Seven Streams of the River Ota (1994) and Elsinore (1995). Lepage was invited in 1994 to direct August Strindberg's A Dream Play at Royal Dramatic Theatre in Stockholm, Sweden. It premiered in the fall of 1994 and guest played in the spring of 1995 in Glasgow Scotland. Geometry of Miracles (1998) and The Far Side of the Moon (French: La Face cachée de la lune, 2000), a solo show in which he juxtaposed the Cold War competition of the Americans and the Soviets in the Space Race with the story of two Québécois brothers—one straight, one gay—and their competitive relationship after their mother's death. It won four trophies at le Gala des Masques, a Time Out Award and the Evening Standard Award. In 2003, The Far Side of the Moon was adapted by Lepage—who plays both brothers—into a film of the same name.

Lepage has directed five other feature films: The Confessional (Le Confessionnal) (1995), Polygraph (Le Polygraphe) (1996), Nô (1998), Possible Worlds (2000) and Triptych (Triptyque) (2013) (the latter co-directed by Pedro Pires), and has acted in films by other directors, including Jesus of Montreal (Jésus de Montréal) (1989) and Stardom (2001) by Denys Arcand. He has also been involved in music productions, being the stage director for the Secret World Tour by Peter Gabriel in 1993/1994, and the subsequent Growing Up tour in 2003/2004. He directed a number of operas, including Bluebeard's Castle and Erwartung at the Canadian Opera Company, The Damnation of Faust in Japan and Paris, and Lorin Maazel's 1984 at the Royal Opera House in London in 2005. Finally, Cirque du Soleil asked him to create the permanent Las Vegas show named Kà at the MGM Grand in 2005.

The Andersen Project is a solo play, based on the life and works of Danish writer Hans Christian Andersen, and his tale "The Dryad"; it was presented by Lepage himself in ten countries, and later starred Yves Jacques.

Lipsynch, his large-canvas work, premiered in its first version in Newcastle upon Tyne's Northern Stage in February 2007 in its five-hour version; it has since been lengthened to nine hours. Three scenes of Lipsynch were later adapted to create the installation FRAGMENTATION (2011) by Richard Castelli and Volker Kuchelmeister for the stereoscopic system ReACTOR, designed by Sarah Kenderdine and Jeffrey Shaw. Walking around the hexagonal base of the device, the viewer can see the same scenes filmed from different angles.

He also staged Igor Stravinsky's The Rake's Progress, which was presented in Brussels' Opéra de la Monnaie in April 2007 and San Francisco War Memorial Opera House in November 2007.

In 2008, Lepage and Ex Machina created The Image Mill, celebrating the 400th anniversary of Quebec City. For forty nights, a forty-minute show was displayed by the banks of Bassin Louise, using the huge surface of the Bunge grain elevators as a giant screen. It was at the time the biggest outdoor architectural projection in the world.

In November 2008, Lepage directed a staged version of Hector Berlioz' The Damnation of Faust at the Metropolitan Opera in New York. In February, 2009, Lepage premiered a new work entitled Eonnagata at Sadler's Wells Theatre, London, UK. For this project he collaborated with the dancers Sylvie Guillem and Russell Maliphant, fashion designer Alexander McQueen, lighting designer Michael Hulls and sound designer Jean-Sébastien Côté.

His production of Stravinsky's The Rake's Progress, conducted by Christopher Hogwood, was re-released at the Teatro Real, Madrid, in January 2009.

In the spring of 2009, Lepage presented The Blue Dragon (Le Dragon Bleu), a sequel to his Dragons' Trilogy, in which he reprised (more than twenty years later) the role of Pierre Lamontagne, a Québécois artist who lives in China.

In the fall of 2009, Lepage directed The Nightingale and Other Short Fables, an operatic staging of short works by Stravinsky blending hand shadow puppetry, kabuki theatre, Chinese opera and Vietnamese water puppetry. The Canadian Opera Company in Toronto premiered the work.

Lepage then wrote and directed Totem, Cirque du Soleil's next touring show, and began work on a new production of Der Ring des Nibelungen by Richard Wagner for the Metropolitan Opera of New York. The series was presented in installments during the 2010/2011 and 2011/2012 seasons – Das Rheingold and Die Walküre were premiered during the 2010/2011 season, Siegfried premiered on October 27, 2011, and Götterdämmerung premiered on January 27, 2012. Lepage's complete Ring cycle premiered in April 2012. The Metropolitan Opera had to install steel reinforcements under the stage in order to support LePage's roughly 45 tonne set. Lepage was featured in a 2012 documentary about the Met Ring production, Wagner's Dream.

In 2012, Lepage appeared as a hologram in Martin Villeneuve's Mars et Avril, a science fiction film based on the graphic novels of the same name.

Lepage's autobiographical "memory play" 887 played in New York City (as "New York Critics Pick") and Toronto in 2017 and 2019. In an associated interview, he calls himself a "lukewarm separatist".

In 2018, Lepage launched SLĀV at the Montreal Jazz Festival; Betty Bonifassi's creation was so controversial that it was cancelled due to public protest - with the charge that white people singing the songs of black 19th-century slaves constituted cultural appropriation. The show caused public protest on the basis of this accusation. Lepage's next production, Kanata, planned for Paris in December 2018, presenting Europeans' first settlement of Canada, was cancelled in July 2018, after complaints from members of the Indigenous community led to his financial backers' withdrawal. Although the show was initially canceled, it was finally presented in December 2018 and received support from Indigenous communities.

Lepage's production of Mozart's The Magic Flute was presented in Quebec in July and August 2018 and there are plans to bring it to the Metropolitan Opera.

At the International Shakespeare Festival 2022 in Craiova, praising him for his innovative spirit and unique creativity, theatre scholar Octavian Saiu described Lepage as one of the true masters of contemporary theatre.

In 2022, Robert Lepage came back to the big screen in Martin Villeneuve's The 12 Tasks of Imelda, co-starring Ginette Reno and Michel Barrette, in which he plays Martin and Denis Villeneuve's father Jean, a notary.

The same year, Lepage announced the creation of a new play based on the work of painter Jean-Paul Riopelle. The show is set to be presented in 2023 on the occasion of the 100th anniversary of the artist.

== Plays ==
- Le Dragon bleu (The Blue Dragon)
- Lipsynch
- Le Projet Andersen (The Andersen Project)
- Busker's Opera
- La Face cachée de la lune (The Far Side of the Moon)
- La Casa Azul
- Zulu Time
- La Tempête (The Tempest)
- La Géométrie des miracles (Geometry of Miracles)
- Les Sept Branches de la Rivière Ota (The Seven Streams of the River Ota)
- Elseneur (Elsinor)
- Les Aiguilles et l'Opium (Needles and Opium)
- Les Plaques tectoniques (Tectonic Plates)
- La Trilogie des Dragons (The Dragons' Trilogy)
- Le Polygraphe (Polygraph)
- Vinci
- Circulations
- Eonnagatta
- 887
- SLĀV
- Frame by Frame
- Glaube, Geld, Krieg und Liebe with the Schaubühne Ensemble in Berlin (2024)

== Filmography ==
Year	Title	Director	Writer
1992	Tectonic Plates	No	Yes
1995	The Confessional (Le Confessionnal)	Yes	Yes
1996	Polygraph (Le Polygraphe)	Yes	Yes
1998	Nô	Yes	Yes
2000	Possible Worlds	Yes	Yes
2003	The Far Side of the Moon (La Face cachée de la lune)	Yes	Yes
2013	Triptych (Triptyque)	Yes	Yes

Acting roles

- 1989: Jesus of Montreal (Jésus de Montréal)
- 1990: Ding et Dong, le film
- 1991: Montreal Stories (Montréal vu par...) - segment "Desperanto"
- 1992: Tectonic Plates
- 1994: Bad Blood (aka Viper)
- 2000: Stardom
- 2003: Far Side of the Moon (La Face cachée de la lune)
- 2004: Audition (L'Audition)
- 2006: No-Vacancy
- 2006: Dans les villes
- 2007: La belle empoisonneuse
- 2012: Mars and April (Mars et Avril)
- 2017: Barefoot at Dawn (Pieds nus dans l'aube)
- 2022: The 12 Tasks of Imelda (Les 12 travaux d'Imelda)
- 2023: Testament

== Honours ==
In 1994, Lepage was made an Officer of the Order of Canada "for his particularly imaginative and innovative work". In 1999, he was made an Officer of the National Order of Quebec. In 2001, he was inducted into Canada's Walk of Fame. He was promoted to Companion of the Order of Canada in 2009 "for his international contributions to the performing arts, particularly in film, theatre and opera, as an actor, producer and director".

In 1994, he also received the National Arts Centre Award, a companion award to the Governor General's Performing Arts Awards. In 2009, Lepage received the Governor General's Performing Arts Award for Lifetime Artistic Achievement. He could not attend the ceremony but accepted the award via a pre-recorded speech.

On April 29, 2007, Lepage was awarded the European Commission's Europe Theatre Prize for 2007. The honours were to be shared between Lepage and German stage director Peter Zadek.

He has been nominated for the Genie Award for Best Achievement in Direction for his films Polygraph (Le Polygraphe), Possible Worlds, and Far Side of the Moon. He won the award for his film The Confessional (Le Confessionnal).

He was nominated for the Jutra Award for Best Direction for his film Nô. He won the Special Jutra Award for his film Possible Worlds.

In 2013, Lepage won the tenth Glenn Gould Prize.

== Europe Theatre Prize ==
In 2007, he was awarded the XI Europe Theatre Prize, in Thessaloniki. The prize organization stated:

The Quebec director Robert Lepage, although not from Europe, continues to exert a considerable influence on the theatre of the Old World, renewing its means of expression and working very often with European actors and with a repertoire, sensibilities and viewpoint which can be seen as European. The choice of Lepage, like that of America's Robert Wilson in his time, has to be seen primarily in the context of a cultural policy which, as provided for in the rules of the Prize laid down in 1986 in agreement with the European Commission, has as its objective the presentation of prizes to "a theatre personality or institution that has contributed by the creation of cultural events of significance to mutual understanding and knowledge among nations".
