= Sexual abuse by UN peacekeepers =

Various personnel of the United Nations (UN) peacekeeping force are accused of committing large-scale sexual abuse, frequently of children, and related crimes while on duty. An Associated Press (AP) investigation revealed in 2017 that "at least 134 Sri Lankan peacekeepers" from the UN were involved in a child sex ring in Haiti over a 10-year period and that although 114 of them were sent home, none were charged for the crimes.

The AP further found that over the 12 years before 2017, there had been almost 2,000 allegations of sexual abuse and exploitation by peacekeepers and other UN personnel around the world. These crimes occurred among personnel from and in many countries. After the report, U.S. Ambassador to the UN, Nikki Haley, urged all countries to hold their UN peacekeepers accountable for any sexual abuse or exploitation. The responsibility for such charges falls upon the perpetrators' home countries as the UN has no direct jurisdiction over peacekeepers; the only punitive measures available to the organization directly are repatriation and banning from future missions. Few of the accusees in mass-scale events are ever charged with any crime, in significant part due to the large number of accused peacekeepers from countries lacking advanced legal systems or robust sexual abuse legislation.

As early as 2004, Amnesty International reported that underage girls were being kidnapped, tortured, and forced into prostitution in Kosovo with UN and NATO personnel driving demand. The UN's department of peacekeeping in New York acknowledged at that time that "peacekeepers have come to be seen as part of the problem in trafficking rather than the solution". Until the 2000s, the UN did not keep detailed statistics concerning such incidents. In 2015, the UN started disclosing more figures about thousands of allegations of forced sex with UN soldiers in exchange for material aid, of which hundreds involved minors.

The scope of the problem is worldwide. A UN report in 2016 cited 21 countries that had 69 credible reports of incidents from the previous year alone, though the Canadian press has indicated that such numbers are vast undercounts due to the lack of obvious figures of authority over such foreign national troops and lopsided power dynamics within war-stricken countries. This article focuses on locations of large clusters involving many specific or egregious cases for which there exists confirmed documentation, including Haiti, Sudan, Central African Republic, Cambodia, Mozambique, Democratic Republic of the Congo, Bosnia, and Kosovo.

== Sexual abuse by UN personnel ==
UN troops in Sudan, the Democratic Republic of the Congo (DRC), and the Central African Republic have been accused of sexual abuse of women, men, and often children.

After a process concluding in 2005, UN employees were accused of sexual abuse of a "significant number" of women and girls, many under 18 and some as young as 13, in the DRC. There were over 70 allegations against seven men, "all but one of them peacekeepers". Unusually, one of the accused men faced charges upon repatriation as he came from France where the legal system follows up on such offences.

In the Central African Republic (formerly known as Ubangi-Shari), at least 98 girls said they had been sexually abused by UN peacekeepers from Burundi and Gabon in 2014 and 2015. The UN successfully identified 41 troops accused of involvement in the incidents, which included forced acts of bestiality. The personnel identified were returned to their homelands but have not faced charges.

== Forced prostitution and exploitation by UN personnel ==
In addition to those countries mentioned in the previous section, reporters and internal observers witnessed a rapid increase in prostitution in Cambodia, Mozambique, Haiti, Bosnia, and Kosovo after UN peacekeeping forces moved in.

Instances of abuse during the United Nations Transitional Authority in Cambodia (UNTAC) mission caused widespread outrage after many of the abused women and girls ended up contracting HIV/AIDS and other sexually-transmitted infections (STIs) that were uncommon among the local population at the time. In an attempt to quell the outbreak of HIV/AIDS and other STIs, the UN shipped over 800,000 condoms to the country over the course of the mission. Meanwhile, the number of prostitutes in Cambodia rose by at least 300% from an estimated 6000 to more than 25,000 in just two years. The legacy of UNTAC is still experienced within Cambodian society by many of the children born to abuse victims who feel like outsiders in their own country due to their frequently darker skin tone and obvious mixed-race parentage. During UNTAC (1992-93), the UN did not keep thorough records of abuse allegations against peacekeepers, so the numbers involved from these earlier missions have necessarily been reconstructed through academic work and are less precise than in, for example, Haiti during the 2000s.

In Haiti, between 2004 and 2007, at least 134 Sri Lankan peacekeepers operated a child sex ring involving at least 9 confirmed children. According to incident reports, they wanted both girls and boys as young as 12 for sex. "I did not even have breasts", one anonymous girl claimed in her statement. She relayed to UN investigators that from the ages of 12 to 15, she been raped by over 40 peacekeepers, including a man known as "Commandant", who paid her 75 cents. She stated that she spent that time sleeping in UN trucks on the UN base itself. According to the Associated Press article that made the events public, they lured children with offers of candy and cash. After an internal UN report incriminated the peacekeepers, some remained in the country while 114 were sent back to Sri Lanka, but none served any jail time, as it would've been the responsibility of their local judicial system to bring forth and prosecute any charges. Despite the responsibility falling upon the peacekeepers' native countries to try those involved in sex abuse and exploitation, few of the accusees in these mass-scale cases have ever been charged, in part due to the large number of peacekeepers from countries lacking either advanced judiciaries or robust sexual abuse legislation.

A Kosovo victims support group reported that of the prostitutes in their local area, a third were under 14 and 80% were under 18. Amnesty International said that some victims of forced prostitution were routinely raped "as a means of control and coercion" and kept in terrible conditions as slaves by their "owners", sometimes in darkened rooms from which they were unable to leave. In Bosnia, there was a highly publicised case concerning the direct involvement of UN peacekeeping personnel in the procurement of sex slaves for a local brothel. Some NATO troops and private contractors of the firm DynCorp have been linked to prostitution and forced prostitution in Bosnia and Kosovo, though the extent of the involvement of particularly NATO in comparison to the private firms and UN itself has been debated.

In 1996, it was determined that fully half of peacekeeping missions are correlated with a "rapid rise in child prostitution" in their respective countries.

== 1996 UN study ==
In the 1996 UN study The Impact of Armed Conflict on Children, former first lady of Mozambique Graça Machel concluded: "In 6 out of 12 country studies on sexual exploitation of children in situations of armed conflict prepared for the present report, the arrival of peacekeeping troops has been associated with a rapid rise in child prostitution."

Eight years later, Indian-born feminist Gita Sahgal again raised the issue of the relationship between supposed humanitarian intervention and the prostitution and sex abuse that frequently follows. She observed that "the issue with the UN is that peacekeeping operations unfortunately seem to be doing the same thing that other militaries do." She concluded that "even the guardians have to be guarded", recalling the philosophical issue and rhetorical question of quis custodiet ipsos custodes? ("who watches the watchers?").

== Canadian government analysis ==
Internal Canadian government documents from 2016 suggest that the UN has "glaring gaps" in its procedures for tracking and prosecuting peacekeepers accused of exploitation and sexual abuse, and that only a small fraction of cases are likely to be reported. The Toronto Star obtained the memo, which contains the claim that "Events in [the Central African Republic] and the data coming out of the [Secretary General's 2016] annual report point to a system that is lacking in efficiency, transparency and coherency." The memo goes on to say:

"Part of the answer to these deficiencies lies in establishing enduring, system-wide structures but the nature of UN governance makes this a challenging endeavor. In addition, as we continue to unpack how member states themselves can better approach this issue from pre-deployment training to punishing perpetrators to victims’ assistance, there must also be a greater willingness by individual countries to examine and address internal shortfalls."

In 2016, a UN report named 21 countries that had 69 credible reports of incidents in 2015. One briefing note obtained by the Star claimed that "unique, structural factors within the UN system" made harder their goals of greater transparency and enforcement. "Although military personnel are covered by military codes of conduct and justice systems, UN police and civilian staff accused of [sexual exploitation and abuse] in the field may face only minor disciplinary measures, such as repatriation and being barred from future deployments," the unclassified document reads.

== "Actions of a few" ==
In the early 2000s, proponents of peacekeeping argued that the actions of a minority of the peacekeeping force should not be allowed to tarnish what they perceived as necessary work by the majority of participants in such UN missions. Others have criticized the UN over its apparent failure to take the issue seriously enough. As many more incidents came to light in the decade following the first reports, commentators and organizations such as Human Rights Watch (HRW) suggested that the problem had extended beyond the "actions of a few", with HRW highlighting that other major supranational organizations involved in these missions had the same problems, including the African Union.

== In popular culture ==
In 2010, a film, The Whistleblower, directed by Larysa Kondracki, aired on the affair, based on Nebraskan police officer Kathryn Bolkovac, who served as a peacekeeper in post-war Bosnia and outed the U.N. for covering up the sex scandal. The film featured Rachel Weisz, Monica Bellucci, Vanessa Redgrave, and many others.
