= 32nd Genie Awards =

2012 Canadian film awards ceremony

- Date: March 8, 2012
- Site: Westin Harbour Castle Hotel, Toronto, Ontario
- Hosted by: George Stroumboulopoulos

Highlights
- Best Picture: Monsieur Lazhar
- Most awards: Monsieur Lazhar (6)
- Most nominations: Café de Flore (13)

Television coverage
- Network: CBC Television

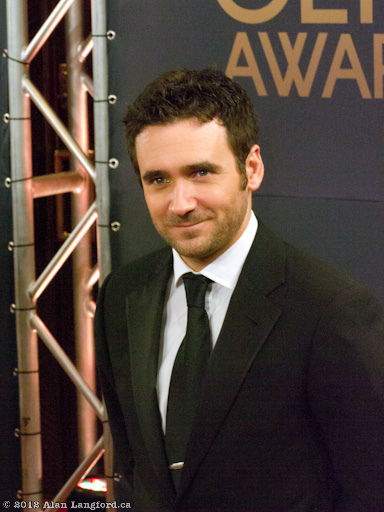
Allan Hawco, Genie Awards 2012.

The 32nd Genie Awards ceremony was held on March 8, 2012 to honour films released in 2011. Nominations were announced on January 17, 2012.

The ceremony was originally scheduled to be hosted by Andrea Martin and George Stroumboulopoulos, but Martin was forced to cancel at the last minute due to a rescheduled acting commitment. Stroumboulopoulos consequently hosted the ceremony alone, although he and Martin pretaped an introductory comedy segment in which they scrambled to find a replacement for Martin, including cameos by Martin Short, Chris Hyndman and Steven Sabados.

This was the last Genie Awards ceremony to be held before the Academy of Canadian Cinema and Television announced the merger of the Genies with the Gemini Awards into the contemporary Canadian Screen Awards.

== Performers ==
The nominees for Best Original Song were presented accompanied by choreographed figure skating routines by Jamie Salé, David Pelletier and Joannie Rochette.

Johnny Reid, The Sheepdogs and K'naan also performed during the ceremony.

== Nominations ==
Motion Picture	Direction
Monsieur Lazhar — Luc Déry, Kim McCraw; Café de Flore — Jean-Marc Vallée, Marie-Claude Poulin, Pierre Even; A Dangerous Method — Jeremy Thomas, Marco Mehlitz, Martin Katz; Starbuck — André Rouleau; The Whistleblower — Celine Rattray, Christina Piovesan	Philippe Falardeau, Monsieur Lazhar; David Cronenberg, A Dangerous Method; Larysa Kondracki, The Whistleblower; Steven Silver, The Bang Bang Club; Jean-Marc Vallée, Café de Flore
Actor in a leading role	Actress in a leading role
Mohamed Fellag, Monsieur Lazhar; Garret Dillahunt, Oliver Sherman; Michael Fassbender, A Dangerous Method; Patrick Huard, Starbuck; Scott Speedman, Citizen Gangster	Vanessa Paradis, Café de Flore; Catherine De Léan, Nuit #1; Pascale Montpetit, The Girl in the White Coat; Rachel Weisz, The Whistleblower; Michelle Williams, Take This Waltz
Actor in a supporting role	Actress in a supporting role
Viggo Mortensen, A Dangerous Method; Antoine Bertrand, Starbuck; Kevin Durand, Citizen Gangster; Marin Gerrier, Café de Flore; Taylor Kitsch, The Bang Bang Club	Sophie Nélisse, Monsieur Lazhar; Roxana Condurache, The Whistleblower; Hélène Florent, Café de Flore; Julie Le Breton, Starbuck; Charlotte Sullivan, Citizen Gangster
Original Screenplay	Adapted Screenplay
Ken Scott and Martin Petit, Starbuck; Anne Émond, Nuit #1; Eilis Kirwan and Larysa Kondracki, The Whistleblower; Jean-Marc Vallée, Café de Flore; Ryan Ward and Matthew Heiti, Son of the Sunshine	Philippe Falardeau, Monsieur Lazhar; Ryan Redford, Oliver Sherman; David F. Shamoon, In Darkness; Steven Silver, The Bang Bang Club
Feature Length Documentary	Short Documentary
At Night, They Dance (La nuit, elles dansent) — Isabelle Lavigne, Stéphane Thibault; Beauty Day — Jay Cheel; Family Portrait in Black and White — Julia Ivanova, Boris Ivanov; The Guantanamo Trap — Thomas Wallner; Wiebo's War — David York, Bryn Hughes, Nick Hector	Sirmilik — Zacharias Kunuk, Joel McConvey, Kristina McLaughlin, Kevin McMahon, Michael McMahon, Geoff Morrison, Ryan J. Noth; 75 Watts — John Cullen; Derailments — Chelsea McMullan
Best Live Action Short Drama	Best Animated Short
Doubles with Slight Pepper — Ian Harnarine; Hope — Pedro Pires, Phoebe Greenberg, Penny Mancuso; Ora — René Chénier, Philippe Baylaucq; La Ronde — Élaine Hébert, Sophie Goyette	Romance — Georges Schwizgebel, René Chénier, Marc Bertrand; Choke — Michelle Latimer; Inner City (La Cité entre les murs) — Alain Fournier; Muybridge's Strings — Kōji Yamamura, Michael Fukushima, Shuzo John Shiota and Keisuke Tsuchihashi; Wild Life — Amanda Forbis, Wendy Tilby, Marcy Page, Bonnie Thompson
Art Direction/Production Design	Cinematography
James McAteer, A Dangerous Method; Jean Bécotte, Funkytown; Aidan Leroux and Rob Hepburn, Citizen Gangster; Patrice Vermette, Café de Flore; Emelia Weavind, The Bang Bang Club	Jean-François Lord, Snow & Ashes; Miroslaw Baszak, The Bang Bang Club; Pierre Cottereau, Café de Flore; Jon Joffin, Daydream Nation; Ronald Plante, Monsieur Lazhar
Costume Design	Editing
Marie-Chantale Vaillancourt, Funkytown; Denise Cronenberg, A Dangerous Method; Farnaz Khaki-Sadigh, Afghan Luke; Ginette Magny and Emmanuelle Youchnovski, Café de Flore; Heather Neale, Keyhole	Stéphane Lafleur, Monsieur Lazhar; Jean-François Bergeron, The Year Dolly Parton Was My Mom; Michael Czarnecki, In Darkness; Patrick Demers, Suspicions (Jaloux); Ronald Sanders, A Dangerous Method
Overall Sound	Sound Editing
Orest Sushko and Christian Cooke, A Dangerous Method; Stéphane Bergeron, Yann Cleary and Lise Wedlock, Wetlands (Marécages); Pierre Bertrand, Shaun Nicholas Gallagher and Bernard Gariépy Strobl, Monsieur Lazhar; Jean Minondo, Jo Caron, Gavin Fernandes and Louis Gignac, Café de Flore; Lou Solakofski, Stephan Carrier and Kirk Lynds, The Bang Bang Club	Wayne Griffin, Rob Bertola, Tony Currie, Andy Malcolm and Michael O'Farrell, A Dangerous Method; Fred Brennan, James Bastable, Gabe Knox and John Sievert, You Are Here; Claude Beaugrand, Olivier Calvert, Natalie Fleurant and Francine Poirier, Wetlands (Marécages); Martin Pinsonnault, Blaise Blanchier, Simon Meilleur, Mireille Morin and Luc Raymond, Café de Flore; Jeremy MacLaverty, Daniel Pellerin, Geoff Raffan, Jan Rudy, John Sievert and James Mark Stewart, In Darkness
Achievement in Music: Original Score	Achievement in Music: Original Song
Howard Shore, A Dangerous Method; Ramachandra Borcar, Suspicions (Jaloux); Mychael Danna, The Whistleblower; Martin Léon, Monsieur Lazhar; Philip Miller, The Bang Bang Club	Carole Facal, "Quelque part" — Starbuck; Jay Brannan, "My Love My Love" — Cloudburst; Malajube, "Œil pour œil" — Good Neighbours; Steven Page, "A Different Sort of Solitude" — French Immersion; Jean Robitaille and Steve Galluccio, "Waiting for Your Touch" — Funkytown
Make-Up	Visual Effects
Christiane Fattori and Frédéric Marin, Café de Flore; Amber Makar, Amazon Falls; Virginie Paré, BumRush; Tammy Lou Pate, Snow & Ashes; Leslie Sebert and David R. Beecroft, Take This Waltz	Vincent Dudouet, Cynthia Mourou, Éric Normandin, Martin Pensa, Marc Cote, Stephanie Broussaud, Sylvain Theroux, Luc Sansfacon, Nathalie Tremblay and Garry Chuntz, Café de Flore; Robert Crowther, Tony Cybulski, Ian Britton and Tom Turnbull, Citizen Gangster; Ovidiu Cinazan, Mike Borrett, Milan Schere, Oliver Hearsey, Dennis Berardi, Mathew Borrett, Wilson Cameron, Jim Price, Wojciech Zielinski and Jason Edwardh, A Dangerous Method; Geoffroy Lauzon, BumRush; Jacques Levesque, Eve Brunet, Philippe Roberge, Snow & Ashes
Special Awards
Claude Jutra Award: Nuit #1, Anne Émond; Golden Reel Award: Starbuck
