= In Darkness (2011 film) =

2011 film

- Polish theatrical release poster
- Directed by: Agnieszka Holland
- Written by: David F. Shamoon
- Based on: In the Sewers of Lvov by Robert Marshall
- Produced by: Andrzej Besztak; Steffen Reuter; Patrick Knippel; Marc-Daniel Dichant; Leander Carell; Juliusz Machulski; Paul Stephens; Eric Jordan
- Starring: Robert Więckiewicz; Benno Fürmann; Agnieszka Grochowska; Maria Schrader; Herbert Knaup; Kinga Preis; Krzysztof Skonieczny
- Cinematography: Jolanta Dylewska
- Edited by: Mike Czarnecki
- Music by: Antoni Komasa-Łazarkiewicz
- Production companies: Zebra Films, Schmidtz Katze Filmkollektiv, the Film Works
- Distributed by: Kino Świat (Poland); NFP Marketing & Distribution (Germany); Mongrel Media (Canada)
- Release dates: 2 September 2011 (Telluride (USA)); 15 September 2011 (Poland)
- Running time: 144 minutes
- Countries: Poland; Germany; Canada
- Languages: Polish; German; Yiddish; Ukrainian

In Darkness (Polish: W ciemności) is a dual-perspective 2011 Polish drama film written by David F. Shamoon and directed by Agnieszka Holland. It was nominated for Best Foreign Language Film at the 84th Academy Awards.

Based on true events during German occupation of Poland, the film tells about Leopold Socha, a sewer worker in the Polish city of Lwów. He used his knowledge of the city's sewer system to shelter a group of Jews who had escaped from the Lwów Ghetto during the Holocaust in former Poland.

== Plot ==
During the Nazi occupation of Poland, two Lvov sewer workers, Leopold Socha and Szczepek Wróblewski, become looters. They witness Nazis executing Jewish women in the woods before returning home. In the Lvov ghetto, Jews face persecution and humiliation by German SS men and collaborating Ukrainian police. Illegal trade and prostitution flourish under the ghetto walls, involving smugglers like Mundek Margulies.

While working in the sewers, Socha and Szczepek encounter Jews attempting to escape to greater Lvov, beyond the ghetto. Ignacy Chiger gives Socha a watch, seeking their assistance. Socha hesitantly agrees to hide the Chiger family for payment, despite Szczepek's concerns. The Jews accept the offer. Later, at a tavern, they meet with Bortnik from the Ukrainian Auxiliary Police, who praises the Nazis. As they resume work, gunshots signal the start of the Lvov ghetto's liquidation. Paulina Chiger and others flee into the sewers. Socha, Szczepek, Mundek, and Janek Grossman organize an evacuation, with Janek leaving his family for his mistress, Chaja.

Socha is captured by Ukrainian shooters but released by Bortnik. He hides his involvement with Jews from his wife, Wanda, discussing the persecution of Jews with her. Wanda mentions Jesus was Jewish, leading Socha to reflect. Socha discovers his shopkeeper knows about his actions. He descends into the sewers, learning Mania is missing. Negotiating with the Jews, Socha considers accommodating them all underground.

Shortly after, Bortnik confronts Socha about the shopkeeper's tip-off and pressures him to reveal the Jews' location. Socha initially complies but later reveals his secret to his wife during dinner, causing panic. Bortnik grows suspicious of Socha's honesty. the hidden Jews argue amongst themselves, distrusting Socha. Socha decides not to accept more money from them but contemplates betraying them after Janek escapes. He argues with Szczepek and ends their cooperation.

One winter morning, Socha sees an SS man aiming at Mundek and cleverly kills him with a Jewish smuggler's help. He later discovers that ten Poles, including Szczepek, were hanged for the SS man's death. Socha's new accomplice spots the hiding Jews and plans to inform, prompting Socha to move them to safety under a church. Chaja, pregnant with Janek's child, joins them and gives birth but suffocates the baby to avoid detection. Mundek and Socha find Janek and his companions dead. Socha agrees to smuggle Mundek to find Mania, but they are shot by guards. Mundek returns to the hideout.

One spring night, heavy rain floods the sewers during Socha's daughter's first Holy Communion. Socha rushes to rescue the hidden Jews, followed by the suspicious Bortnik. Socha escapes but loses consciousness in the rising water. He wakes to find Bortnik dead and emerges to the surface. As the Soviets enter Lvov, the surviving Jews emerge from the sewers.

The film concludes with the final caption:

Leopold Socha died on May 12, 1946, saving his daughter from the wheels of a speeding truck of the Red Army. At his funeral, someone said 'It is God's punishment for helping Jews.' As if we needed God to punish each other.

== Cast ==
- Robert Więckiewicz as Leopold Socha
- Benno Fürmann as Mundek Margulies
- Agnieszka Grochowska as Klara Keller
- Maria Schrader as Paulina Chiger
- Herbert Knaup as Ignacy Chiger
- Kinga Preis as Wanda Socha
- Krzysztof Skonieczny as Szczepek Wróblewski
- Julia Kijowska as Chaja
- Marcin Bosak as Janek Weiss
- Jerzy Walczak as Jakob Berestycki
- Michał Żurawski as Bortnik
- Piotr Głowacki as Jacek Frenkiel
- Zofia Pieczyńska as Stefcia Socha
- Etel Szyc as Szona Grossman
- Andrzej Mastalerz as Sawicki
- Ida Łozińska as Rachela Grossman
- Laura Lo Zito as Irena
- Alexander Levit as Kovalev
- Frank Köbe as Gustav Wilhaus

== Production and release ==
Dedicated to Marek Edelman, the film is a Polish-German-Canadian coproduction, with a screenplay by Canadian writer David F. Shamoon. In Darkness is based on the book In the Sewers of Lvov (1990) by Robert Marshall. The last survivor of the group, Krystyna Chiger, published a memoir of her experience, The Girl in the Green Sweater: A Life in Holocaust's Shadow (2008). It was not a source for the film, as Holland was unaware of the book prior to the film's release This was the first full-length film shown at the 23rd Polish Film Festival in America in Chicago on the Opening Night Gala.

== Context ==
In Darkness is part of a larger shift in Polish cinema that emerged in the late 20th and early 21st centuries following the publication of Jan Blonski’s “The Poor Poles Look at the Ghetto.” The piece suggested Poles carry with them a “feeling of guilt which we do not want to admit” concerning the Holocaust because of their inaction. Blonski sparked a nationwide debate on postwar discussion of the Holocaust, particularly that of collective responsibility. Between 1987 and 2009, nearly one hundred films were made in Poland, a number testifying to the eruption of repressed memory and response to the intensifying debate. Each film carried with it a different interpretation of Polish involvement in the Holocaust. For instance, Felik Falk’s Joanna (2010) conflates Polish and Jewish suffering, while Wladyslaw Pasikowski’s Aftermath (2012) attempts to acknowledge Polish participation in Nazi atrocities and challenge the shared suffering perspective. Holland’s In Darkness, neither uses Polish antisemitism as a central theme nor conflates the groups’ suffering. The film also does little to address the broader implications of Polish indifference and Nazi collaboration. Although Holland is self-critical for her initial depictions of Polish indifference and cliche antisemitism, it is wildly limited, particularly in the fact that by the end of the film, the Polish man is seen as the hero, and his starting beliefs did not have any long-lasting impact on the group of Jews he harboured.

== Reception ==
As of October 2020, a majority of film critics have given the film a positive review. In Darkness has an approval rating of 88% on review aggregator website Rotten Tomatoes, based on 114 reviews, and an average rating of 7.60/10. It also has a score of 74 out of 100 on Metacritic, based on 36 critics, indicating "generally favorable reviews".

A review by Lisa Schwarzbaum of Entertainment Weekly called it "a harrowing nail-biter of a movie". Ella Taylor of NPR wrote In Darkness "satisfies for the intensity of the performances and for the artful contrasting of life on the teeming streets of L'viv with life and death in the dim, rat-infested sewers", adding that it "is often a thrilling adventure picture — as if Anne Frank had found an Inglourious Basterd to help her make The Great Escape". Ty Burr of The Boston Globe called the film "a harrowing Holocaust tale, but one that speaks to humankind's capacity to endure, to fight on in the face of terrible cruelty", adding that Holland "elicits taut performances from a strong cast". David Denby of The New Yorker called it "the most volatile that Holland has directed. With a distinguished, hardworking cast of German and Polish actors", noting that "honesty is the movie's greatest strength". Todd McCarthy of The Hollywood Reporter said this "harrowing, engrossing, claustrophobic and sometimes literally hard to watch […] robust, arduous drama is more ironic and multi-faceted than most such tales and should be well received by the considerable art house audience worldwide partial to the subject matter". Joe Morgenstern of The Wall Street Journal said this "brave epic" film's "suspense, derived from a true story, is excruciating and inspiring in equal measure". A. O. Scott of The New York Times called In Darkness "suspenseful, horrifying and at times intensely moving […] touching, warm and dramatically satisfying". On the other hand, Roger Ebert of the Chicago Sun-Times dismissed the film as redundant and inferior to Schindler's List which was "more entertaining" in his view. Michael Atkinson of the Village Voice claimed that "Holland does skirt the ethical entrapment of Schindler's List (over-lionizing the Aryan rescuer)", adding: "It's not fair, but there it is: We've been here before." The German authorities in occupied Poland referred to non-Jews, including Poles, as Aryans; colloquially, documents proving one's non-Jewish identity were called "Aryan papers", and the areas prohibited to Jews were known collectively as "the Aryan side". the Polish districts of citi David Edelstein of New York Magazine wrote: "In outline, In Darkness is a standard conversion melodrama, but little within those parameters is easy. The darkness lingers into the light." Mick LaSalle of San Francisco Chronicle called it "an extraordinary movie, and somehow good art […] a gripping piece of history and also an exploration into the mysteries of the human soul", and gave it "the highest recommendation".

=== Awards ===
In Darkness was nominated for the Best Foreign Language Film at the 84th Academy Awards. Nominated alongside the official Canadian nominee Monsieur Lazhar, it attracted attention in the country for marking the first time in the history of Cinema of Canada that had its two films nominated for the best foreign language film Oscar in the same year. At the International Valladolid Film Festival (SEMINCI), Agnieszka Holland won the award for Best Director. The film garnered several award nominations at the 32nd Genie Awards, including Best Adapted Screenplay for Shamoon. It also received the Grand Prix at the 7th Batumi International Art-house Film Festival. The film also received "Golden Camera 300" at ICFF "Manaki Brothers" for best motion pictures.

== See also ==
- Europa Europa, Agnieszka Holland's 1990 film about Solomon Perel
- Rescue of Jews by Poles during the Shoah
- Polish Righteous among the Nations
- List of submissions to the 84th Academy Awards for best foreign language film
- List of Polish submissions for the Academy Award for best foreign language film
- The Girl in the Green Sweater: A Life in Holocaust's Shadow, a memoir by one of those Mr. Socha saved
