= Oliver Sherman =

- Directed by: Ryan Redford
- Written by: Ryan Redford
- Based on: "Veterans" by Rachel Ingalls
- Produced by: Eric Jordan; Paul Stephens
- Starring: Garret Dillahunt; Donal Logue; Molly Parker
- Cinematography: Antonio Calvache
- Edited by: Matthew Hannam
- Music by: Benoît Charest
- Production company: The Film Works
- Distributed by: Mongrel Media
- Release date: September 13, 2010 (TIFF)
- Running time: 82 minutes
- Country: Canada
- Language: English

Oliver Sherman is a Canadian drama film, directed by Ryan Redford and released in 2010.

Based on the short story "Veterans" by Rachel Ingalls, the film stars Garret Dillahunt as Sherman Oliver, a war veteran seeking to reconnect with Franklin Page (Donal Logue), a fellow soldier who saved his life during the war. He is gradually revealed to be jealous and unstable, causing significant problems for Page and his wife Irene (Molly Parker).

It premiered at the 2010 Toronto International Film Festival, before going into general release in 2011.

== Awards ==
The film won the National Film Board Award for Best Canadian First Feature at Cinéfest in Sudbury and Best Canadian Feature Film at the Festival du Nouveau Cinéma in Montreal.

The film garnered two nominations at the 2012 Genie Awards, including Best Actor (Dillahunt) and Best Adapted Screenplay.
