= Lwów Ghetto =

World War II Jewish ghetto

Coordinates: 49°50′22″N 24°1′58″E

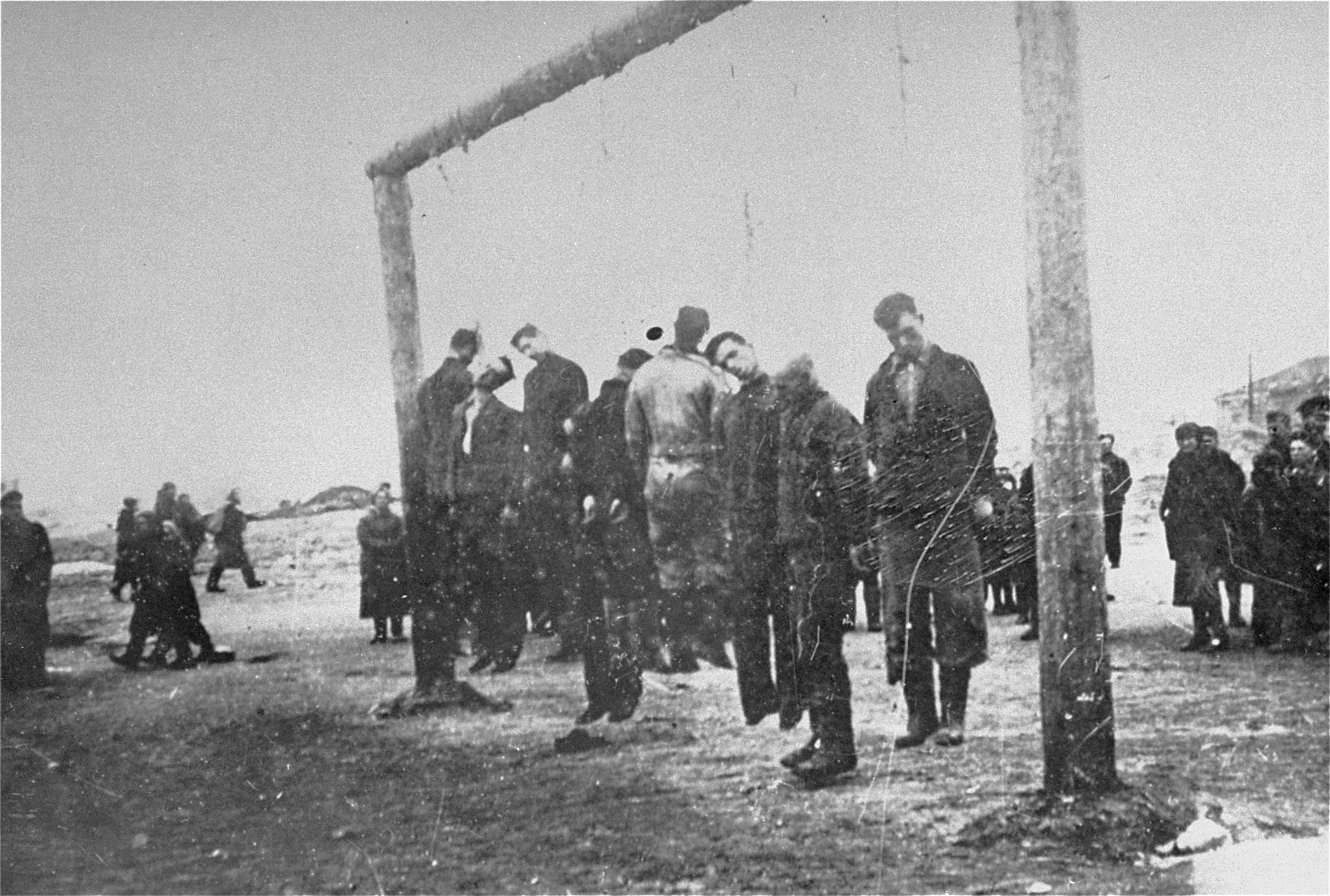
- Hanging of the Lwów Ghetto Judenrat, 1942
- Also known as: German: Ghetto Lemberg
- Location: Lwów, Zamarstynów (German-occupied Poland)
- Date: 8 November 1941 to 20 June 1943
- Incident type: Imprisonment, mass shootings, forced labor, starvation, forced abortions and sterilization
- Organizations: SS, Ukrainian People's Militia
- Camp: Belzec extermination camp Janowska concentration camp
- Victims: 120,000 Polish Jews
- Survivors: 823

The Lwów Ghetto (German: Ghetto Lemberg; Polish: getto we Lwowie) was a Nazi ghetto in the city of Lwów (now Lviv, Ukraine) in the territory of Nazi-administered General Government in German-occupied Poland.

The ghetto, set up in the second half of 1941, was liquidated in June 1943; all its inhabitants who survived prior killings were deported to the Bełżec extermination camp and the Janowska concentration camp.

== Background ==
Lviv (Polish: Lwów) was a multicultural city just before World War II, with a population of 312,231. The city's 157,490 ethnic Poles constituted just over 50 percent of the population, with Jews at 32 percent (99,595) and Ukrainians at 16 percent (49,747). On 28 September 1939, after the joint Soviet-German invasion, the USSR and Germany signed the German–Soviet Frontier Treaty, which assigned about 200,000 km^{2} (77,000 sq mi) of Polish territory inhabited by 13.5 million people of all nationalities to the Soviet Union. Lviv was then annexed to the Soviet Union.

At the time of the German attack on the Soviet Union on 22 June 1941, about 160,000 Jews lived in the city; the number had swelled by tens of thousands due to the arrival of Jewish refugees from German-occupied Poland in late 1939. All along the German-Soviet front, the Soviet secret police (the NKVD) engaged in mass murder of prisoners, in what later became known as the NKVD prisoner massacres. According to estimates by contemporary historians, the number of victims in Western Ukraine was probably between 10,000 and 40,000, with at least two-thirds of them ethnic Ukrainians.

== German invasion and pogroms ==
Lviv was occupied by the German Wehrmacht in the early hours of 30 June 1941. That day, Jews were press-ganged by the Germans to remove bodies of the NKVD's victims from the three local jails. During the morning of 30 June, an ad hoc Ukrainian People's Militia was formed in the city. It included OUN activists who had moved in from Kraków with the Germans, OUN members who lived in Lviv, and former Soviet policemen—who had either decided to switch sides or who were OUN members that had infiltrated the Soviet police. A full-blown pogrom began on the next day, 1 July. Jews were taken from their apartments, made to clean streets on their hands and knees, or perform rituals that identified them with Communism. Jews continued to be brought to the three prisons, first to exhume the bodies and then to be killed. Sub-units of Einsatzgruppe C arrived on 2 July, at which point violence escalated further. The SS death squad conducted a series of mass-murder operations which continued for the next few days.

A second pogrom took place in the last days of July 1941 and was named the "Petlura Days" after the assassinated Ukrainian leader and pogromist Symon Petliura. This pogrom was organized by the Nazis, but carried out by the Ukrainians, as a prologue to the total annihilation of the Jewish population of Lwów. Somewhere in the neighborhood of between 5,000–7,000 Jews were brutally beaten and more than 2,000 murdered in this massacre. In addition, some 3,000 persons, mostly Jews, were executed in the municipal stadium by the German military.

== The ghetto ==
Following the Nazi takeover, SS-Brigadeführer Fritz Katzmann became the SS and Police Leader (SSPF) of Lwów. On his orders the ghetto called Jüdischer Wohnbezirk was established on 8 November 1941 in the northern part of the city. Some 80,000 Jews were ordered to move there by 15 December 1941 and all Poles and Ukrainians to move out. Zamarstynów (now Zamarstyniv) neighborhood was designated to form the Jewish quarter. Before the beginning of World War II it was one of the poorest suburbs of Lwów. German police also began a series of "selections" in an operation called "Action under the bridge" - 5,000 elderly and sick Jews were shot as they crossed under the rail bridge on Pełtewna Street (called bridge of death by the Jews) moving slowly toward the gate. Eventually, between 110,000 and 120,000 Jews were forced into the new ghetto. The living conditions there were extremely poor, coupled with severe overcrowding. For example, food rations allocated to the Jews were estimated to equal only 10% of the German and 50% of the Ukrainian or Polish rations.

The Germans established a Jewish police force called the Jüdischer Ordnungsdienst Lemberg wearing dark blue Polish police uniforms from before World War II, but with the Polish insignia replaced by a Magen David and the new letters J.O.L. in various positions on their uniform. They were given rubber truncheons. Their ranks numbered from 500 to 750 policemen. The Jewish police force answered to the Jewish National city council known as the Judenrat, which in turn answered to the Gestapo.

In 1942, a resistance group was formed in the ghetto with the goal of acquiring arms and escaping into the surrounding forests to fight as partisans. Some members succeeded in this goal. It published an underground periodical. After the deportation of March 1942, leaflets were distributed calling on the population to build bunkers and collect weapons.

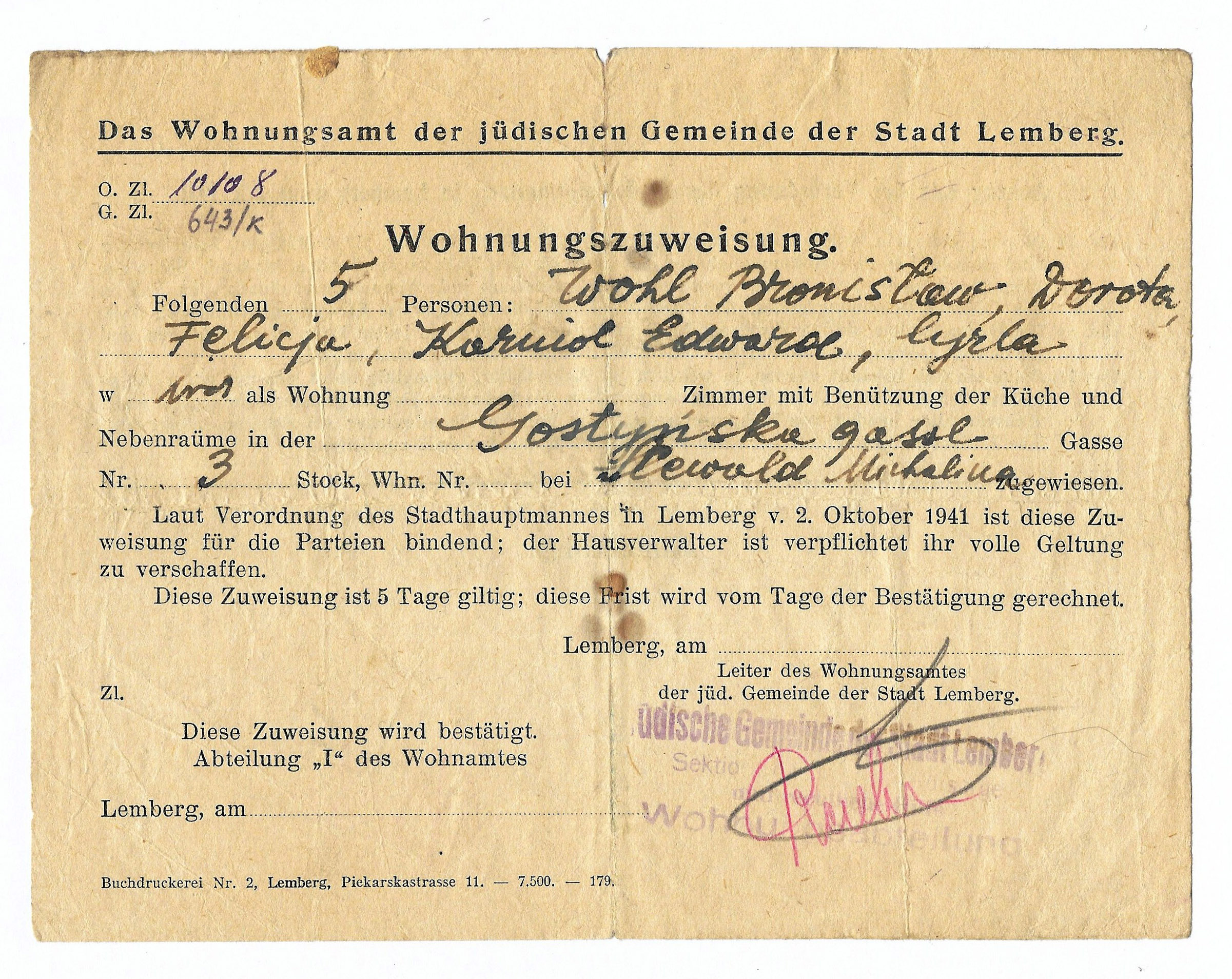
1941 Lwów Ghetto residence permit.

=== Deportations ===
Locations of the Lwów ghetto and the Belzec extermination camp (lower right)

The Lemberg Ghetto was one of the first to have Jews transported to the death camps as part of Aktion Reinhard. Between 16 March and 1 April 1942, approximately 15,000 Jews were taken to the Kleparów railway station and deported to the Belzec extermination camp. Following these initial deportations, and death by disease and random shootings, around 86,000 Jews officially remained in the ghetto, though there were many more not recorded. During this period, many Jews were also forced to work for the Wehrmacht and the ghetto's German administration, especially in the nearby Janowska labor camp. On 24–25 June 1942, 2,000 Jews were taken to the labor camp; only 120 were used for forced labor, and all of the others were shot.

Between 10 and 31 August 1942, the "Great Aktion" was carried out, where between 40,000 and 50,000 Jews were rounded up, gathered at transit point placed in Janowska camp and then deported to Belzec. Many who were not deported, including local orphans and hospital inpatients, were shot. On 1 September 1942 the Gestapo hanged the head of Lwów’s Judenrat and members of the ghetto's Jewish police force on balconies of Judenrat's building at Łokietka street and Hermana street corner. Around 65,000 Jews remained while winter approached with no heating or sanitation, leading to an outbreak of typhus.

Between 5 and 7 January 1943, another 15,000-20,000 Jews, including the last members of the Judenrat, were shot outside of the town on the orders of Fritz Katzmann. After this aktion in January 1943 Judenrat was dissolved, that what remained of the ghetto was renamed Judenlager Lemberg (Jewish Camp Lwów), thus formally redesigned as labor camp with about 12,000 legal Jews, able to work in the German war industry and several thousands illegal Jews (mainly women, children and elderly) hiding in it.

At the beginning of June 1943 Germans decided to end the existence of the Jewish quarter and its inhabitants. On 1 June, Nazi soldiers and police entered the ghetto in the final aktion. This time, the ghetto resistance decided to take up arms and fight while most of the Jews tried to hide themselves in earlier prepared hideouts (so called bunkers). The Nazi forces found themselves facing gunfire, grenades, and Molotov cocktails. The Germans and their Ukrainian collaborators lost 9 killed and 20 wounded. The Nazi forces fought their way through the ghetto, blowing up or burning buildings to kill or flush out the Jews inside. The aktion continued until 20 June, during which about 3,000 Jews were killed and 7,000 were captured and sent to the Janowska concentration camp. Additional manhunts in search of Jews who were hiding continued until July. Some Jews managed to escape or to conceal themselves in the sewer system.

By the time that the Red Army entered Lwów on 26 July 1944, only a few hundred Jews remained in the city. The number varies from 200 to 900 (823 according to data of Jewish Provisional Committee in Lwów, Polish: Tymczasowy Komitet Żydowski we Lwowie from 1945).

Among its notable inhabitants was Chaim Widawski, who disseminated news about the war picked up with an illegal radio. Polish Olympic football player Leon Sperling was shot to death by the Nazis in the ghetto in December 1941. Nazi-hunter Simon Wiesenthal was one of the best-known Jewish inhabitants of Lemberg Ghetto to survive the war (as his memoirs The Murderers Among Us indicate, he was saved from execution by a Ukrainian policeman), though he was later transported to a concentration camp, rather than remaining in the ghetto.

A local Christian, Kazimiera Nazarewicz, a Polish nanny hired by a Jewish family, sheltered their daughter throughout the war, and delivered aid to her parents who were imprisoned in the ghetto. After the war, Nazarewicz was named one of the Righteous Among the Nations. Leopold Socha and Stefan Wróblewski, laborers maintaining the municipal sewage system, organized in their shelters for 21 one Jews who survived the ghetto's liquidation; 10 of them survived the war. Socha, Wróblewski and their wives received the Righteous titles after the war. Another Righteous, Miroslav Kravchuk, with the help of some acquaintances, sheltered his Jewish ex-wife, and some of their other family members and acquaintances. Kravchuk survived a 6-month imprisonment term under the Gestapo after his arrest on suspicion of helping Jews.

== See also ==
- In Darkness 2011 historical drama by David F. Shamoon and Agnieszka Holland
- Jewish ghettos in German-occupied Poland
- The Holocaust in Poland
- World War II casualties of Poland
