= Condurache =

Condurache is a Romanian surname. Notable people with the surname include:

- Dan Condurache (born 1952), Romanian actor
- Roxana Condurache (born 1987), Romanian actress
