= The Girl in the Green Sweater =

2008 book by Krystyna Chiger and Daniel Paisner

- First edition
- Authors: Krystyna Chiger & Daniel Paisner
- Language: English
- Genre: Nonfiction
- Publisher: St. Martin's Press
- Publication date: 30 September 2008
- Publication place: United States
- Media type: Hardcover
- Pages: 288 pp
- ISBN: 978-0-312-37656-7

The Girl in the Green Sweater: A Life in Holocaust’s Shadow, written by coauthors Krystyna Chiger and Daniel Paisner, was published by St. Martin’s Press in 2008.

== Synopsis ==
To avoid Nazi concentration camps during the Holocaust in Ukraine, Krystyna Chiger and her family hid in the sewers of Lviv. To keep warm, she wears a green sweater that is special to her. A sweater that her grandmother had knit her, which is now in the United States Holocaust Memorial Museum.

== Plot ==
The Girl in the Green Sweater is a memoir co-written by Krystyna Chiger and Daniel Paisner following Chiger's early life as she escapes Nazi concentration camps with her family. Living in Lviv, Poland, which is now part of Ukraine, Chiger and her family members are forced into the sewers of her city to escape German forces who threaten the lives of their entire community.

Their escape begins in September 1939, when Germans first begin invading the city of Lviv and Chiger is just starting kindergarten. Once German troops successfully conquer Lviv, Chiger’s family and the rest of the city's Jewish population are forced to a district nicknamed “the ghetto". Once placed into a new home, Chiger's father constructs a multitude of secret hiding places for her and her brother. They hide there for hours, with a small amount of food and a bedpan. In addition, they have to remain perfectly silent, risking capture with the slightest noise.

In May 1943, just before the final “liquidation” of Chiger's community, a small group moves into the sewers through a secret hole her father had been digging for weeks using spoons, forks, and other small tools. While there, Chiger's grandmother knit her a green woolen sweater to keep her warm, inspiring the title of her book.

When describing her experience in the sewers, Chiger mentions a Polish Catholic sewer worker named Leopold Socha. At first, he would bring the group food in exchange for money, but even when the family could no longer compensate him, he continued. She accounts that Socha would also take their clothes to be cleaned, despite the risk of being caught. The Chigers nicknamed him “the angel” because he would go above and beyond to help them.

Chiger mentions a time when she lost her voice due to shock, and Socha helped her get it back. He brought her to a manhole cover and lifted her up to show her the world outside the sewers, filling her with hope and inspiring the return of her voice.

The group endured several life threatening events inside the sewers, including serious flooding and a large fire. Chiger writes about her experience, “We could somehow always come up with something that would make us burst out laughing. I think that this saved us too. It saved our minds.” Of the 150,000 Jews living in Lviv, only three families survived, among them the Chiger family.

== About the Author ==
After escaping from the sewers of Lviv, Chiger and her family moved to Israel. There, she studied to become a dentist and married another Holocaust survivor, named Marian.

Chiger and her husband emigrated to the United States. They now live in Long Island, New York, and Krystyna Chiger is retired. Chiger and Marian have two children and two grandchildren.

Chiger's brother, Pawel, was killed in a car accident when he was 39 years old. He had two children and four grandchildren who now live in Israel. Chiger and Pawel's father died in 1975, and their mother in 2000, aged 91.

Chiger is now the only known living eyewitness to what happened in the sewers of Lviv. Her green sweater was displayed at the United States Holocaust Memorial Museum and has been recreated by knitters around the world.

== Film ==
In Darkness (Polish: W ciemności), a 2011 Polish drama film written by David F. Shamoon and directed by Agnieszka Holland, and nominated for Best Foreign Language Film at the 84th Academy Awards, is based on true events during German occupation of Poland, from the perspective Leopold Socha, a sewer worker in Lviv. He used his knowledge of the city's sewer system to shelter a group of Jews who had escaped from the Lviv Ghetto during the Holocaust in Poland. Chiger was not consulted during the filming, as the director, Agnieszka Holland, did not know that there were any survivors.
