= Daughter of the Sun (2023 film) =

2023 Canadian drama film

- Directed by: Ryan Ward
- Written by: Ryan Ward
- Produced by: Mackenzie Leigh; Ryan Ward
- Starring: Ryan Ward; Nyah Perkin
- Cinematography: Craig Range; Mandeep Sodhi
- Edited by: Mackenzie Leigh; Ryan Ward
- Music by: David Bertok
- Production companies: Memory Pill; Heart Shaped Movies
- Distributed by: Indiecan Entertainment; Buffalo 8
- Release date: July 29, 2023 (Fantasia)
- Running time: 108 minutes
- Country: Canada
- Language: English

Daughter of the Sun is a Canadian drama film, directed by Ryan Ward and released in 2023. A sequel to his 2009 film Son of the Sunshine, the film revisits the story of Sonny (Ward), who is still dealing with Tourette syndrome and living on the run from the events of the first film with his teenage daughter Hildie (Nyah Perkin).

The film premiered at the 2023 Fantasia Film Festival, where it received the bronze medal as second runner-up in audience voting on the Best Canadian Feature Film lineup. It was subsequently screened at film festivals including the 2023 Cinéfest Sudbury International Film Festival, and the 2024 Canadian Film Festival.

The film has been acquired for distribution in the United States by Buffalo 8.
