= Pierre Cottereau =

French cinematographer

Pierre Cottereau is a French cinematographer. He is most noted for his work on the 2011 film Café de Flore, for which he won the Jutra Award for Best Cinematography at the 14th Jutra Awards, and was a Genie Award nominee for Best Cinematography at the 32nd Genie Awards.

== Filmography ==
- 2000: To the Extreme (In extremis)
- 2000: Regarde-moi (en face)
- 2004: A Common Thread (Brodeuses)
- 2004: Clara et Moi
- 2005: Journal IV
- 2006: Fragments of Antonin (Les Fragments d'Antonin)
- 2007: La Part animale
- 2007: Les Yeux bandés
- 2007: Surviving with Wolves (Survivre avec les loups)
- 2007: Teen Spirit (Tel père telle fille)
- 2008: Mascarades
- 2009: Sisters (Gamines)
- 2010: In Their Sleep (Dans ton sommeil)
- 2010: Stranded (Djinns)
- 2010: Beyond Suspicion (Insoupçonnable)
- 2011: Café de Flore
- 2011: Nobody Else but You (Poupoupidou)
- 2012: Granny's Funeral (Adieu Berthe)
- 2012: Bad Seeds (Comme un homme)
- 2012: Welcome to Argentina (Mariage à Mendoza)
- 2013: Eyjafjallajökull
- 2014: Young Tiger (Bébé tigre)
- 2014: The Man from Oran (L'Oranais)
- 2014: Le Père Noël
- 2015: Come What May (En mai, fais ce qu'il te plaît)
- 2015: Rosalie Blum
- 2016: Fanny's Journey (Le Voyage de Fanny)
- 2017: Gauguin: Voyage to Tahiti (Gauguin : Voyage de Tahiti)
- 2017: Just to Be Sure (Ôtez-moi d'un doute)
- 2018: Conviction (Une intime conviction)
- 2018: Best Intentions (Les Bonnes Intentions)
- 2019: The Wolf's Call (Le Chant du loup)
- 2019: Man Up! (Un vrai bonhomme)
- 2019: Of Love and Lies (Fourmi)
- 2021: Black Box (Boîte noire)
- 2021: Third Grace (CE2)
- 2022: Driving Madeleine (Une belle course)
