= Marin Gerrier =

French child actor

Marin Gerrier is a French child actor. He is best known for his performance in the Canadian film Café de Flore, for which he garnered a Genie Award nomination for Best Supporting Actor at the 2012 Genie Awards.

Gerrier, who has Down syndrome, plays a character with Down syndrome in the film.
