= Matthew Heiti =

Canadian actor, screenwriter, novelist and playwright

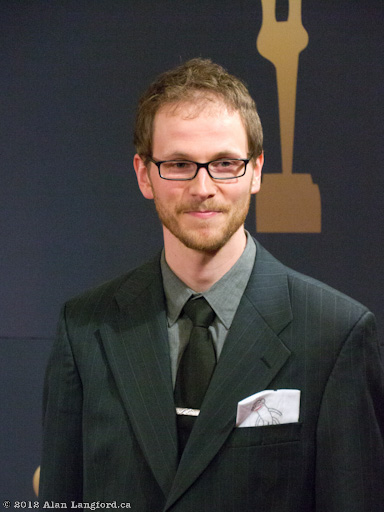
- Born: Sudbury, Ontario
- Occupations: novelist, screenwriter, playwright
- Writing career
- Period: 2000s-present
- Notable works: Son of the Sunshine, The City Still Breathing

Matthew Heiti is a Canadian actor, screenwriter, novelist and playwright. As cowriter with Ryan Ward of the film Son of the Sunshine, he was a Genie Award nominee for Best Original Screenplay at the 32nd Genie Awards in 2012.

Born and raised in Sudbury, Ontario, Heiti was educated at Ryerson University and the University of New Brunswick before returning to Sudbury. His plays include Black Dog: 4 vs the World, Mucking in the Drift, Aviatrix: An Unreal Story of Amelia Earhart, Affidavit, Scar, Place to Be: The Nick Drake Project, Just Beyond the Trees and Plague.

Heiti served as the playwright-in-residence for the Sudbury Theatre Centre for the 2011/2012 season. As playwright-in-residence at STC, Heiti ran the Playwrights’ Junction, a workshop for developing writers.

He published his debut novel, The City Still Breathing, with Coach House Press in 2013.
