= Leopold Socha =

Polish sewage inspector, Righteous among the Nations (1909–1946)

- Born: 28 August 1909; Lwów, Kingdom of Galicia and Lodomeria, Austria-Hungary
- Died: May 12, 1946 (aged 36); Gliwice, Poland
- Other name: Poldek Socha
- Occupation: Sewer inspector
- Spouse: Magdalena Socha
- Honours: Righteous Among the Nations

Leopold "Poldek" Socha (28 August 1909 – 12 May 1946) was a Polish sewage inspector in the city of Lwów (now Lviv, Ukraine). During World War II, Socha used his knowledge of the city's sewage system to shelter a group of Jews from Nazi persecution and their supporters of different nationalities. In 1978 he was recognized by the State of Israel as Righteous Among the Nations.

== Biography ==
Socha lived in a poor neighborhood of Lwów, Poland and worked for the municipal sanitation department and secretly as a burglar and thief. In 1943, he began hiding twenty one Jewish refugees in sewage canals in German-occupied Lwów. The Jews had fled through their floorboards to evade German capture.

Initially the Jews paid their benefactors a fairly expensive price, but eventually ran out of money. Socha, his wife Magdalena, and a co-worker named Stefan Wróblewski continued feeding and sheltering the refugees with their own resources. They aided the group for fourteen months of the German occupation of Lwów. Ten of the twenty one Jewish refugees survived.

In 1946 Socha and his daughter were riding their bicycles when a Soviet military truck came careening toward them. He steered his bicycle in her direction to knock her out of the way, saving her but dying in the process. After his death the Jewish people Socha had sheltered returned to pay their respects.

== Legacy ==
On 23 May 1978 Yad Vashem of Israel recognized Leopold and Magdalena Socha as Righteous Among the Nations. In 1981 Stefan Wróblewski and his wife Anna received the same honor.

Socha was portrayed by Robert Więckiewicz in the 2011 Agnieszka Holland film In Darkness, which was nominated for Best Foreign Language Film at the 84th Academy Awards.

Survivor Krystyna Chiger recounted her time as a child in the sewers being aided by Socha to the USC Shoah Foundation Institute for Visual History and Education, as well as in her 2008 memoir, The Girl in the Green Sweater: A Life in Holocaust's Shadow.

== See also ==
- List of Poles
- Polish Righteous among the Nations
- The Girl in the Green Sweater: A Life in Holocaust's Shadow, a memoir by one of those Mr. Socha saved
