= Madeleine Rees =

British lawyer

Madeleine Rees OBE
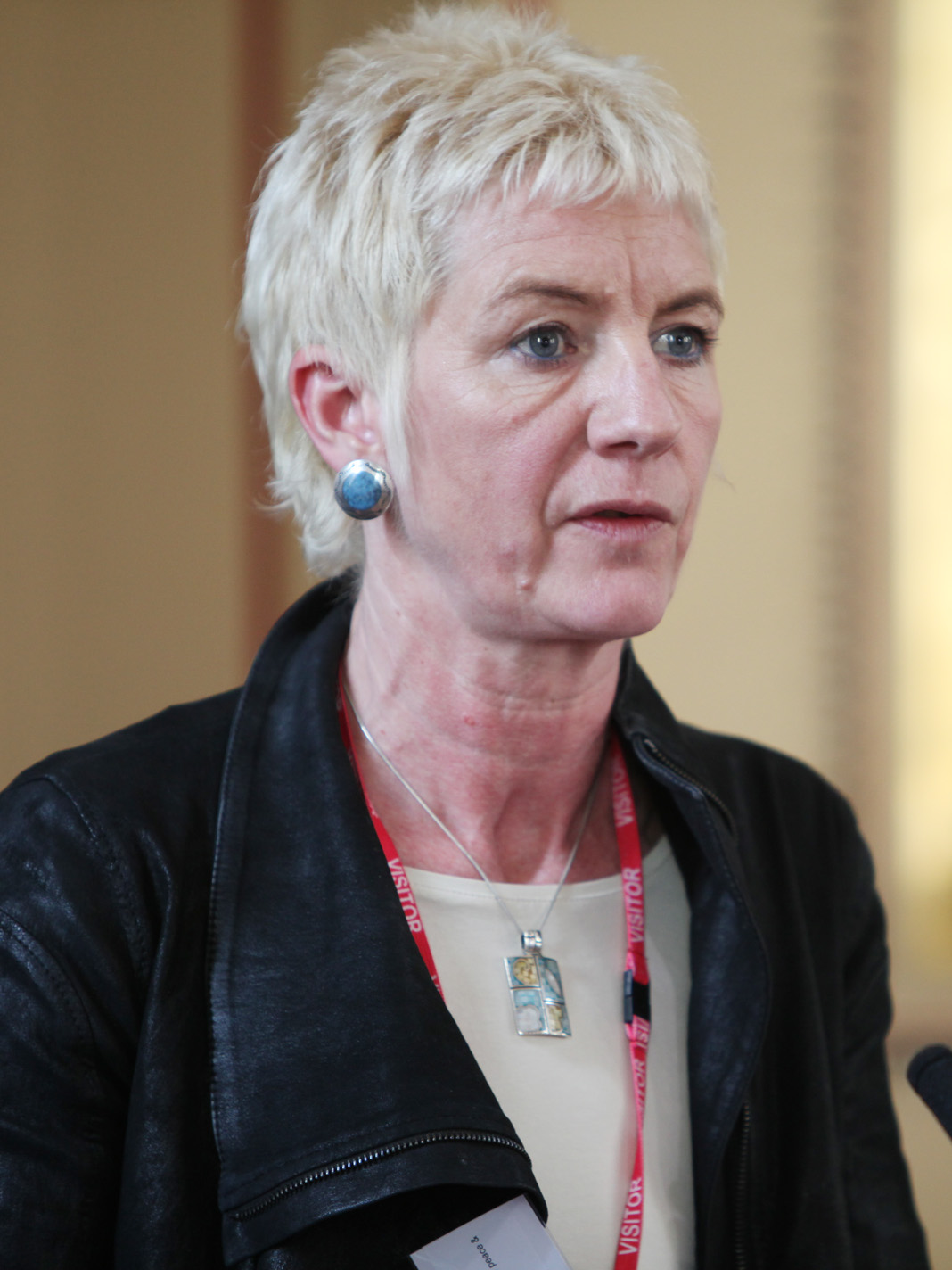
- Rees at the London launch of Human Rights and Democracy: The 2012 Foreign & Commonwealth Office Report, 15 April 2013
- Occupation: Human rights advocate
- Employer: Women's International League for Peace and Freedom

Madeleine Selina Rees, OBE is a British lawyer and former Secretary General of the Women's International League for Peace and Freedom. She has spoken out against human rights abuses in Bosnia by peacekeepers and others working for the United Nations.

== Career ==
Rees became a lawyer in 1990. She worked for a major British law firm, becoming a partner in 1994. There, she specialized in discrimination law, being particularly involved in the area of employment, and also specialized in public and administrative law. Rees worked on behalf of the Commission for Racial Equality and the Equal Opportunities Commission where she helped to establish rights for individuals under domestic law. Discrimination cases brought by Rees have been heard at both the European Court of Human Rights and European Court of Justice in Luxembourg.

In 1998, Rees started working as Head of Office in Bosnia and Herzegovina and as gender expert for the Office of the High Commissioner for Human Rights. She helped to expose human rights abuses related to the sex trade in Bosnia by testifying in support of Kathryn Bolkovac, a United Nations International Police Force monitor who was hired to help end sexual abuse and forced prostitution in Bosnia. Bolkovac revealed use of prostitutes and participation in sex trafficking by members of the United Nations Mission in Bosnia and Herzegovina.

== Wrongful dismissal case ==
In 2009, Rees was demoted from her position, and then in March 2010 she was fired. A United Nations' administrative disputes tribunal ruled it as a wrongful dismissal. The office of the High Commissioner denied the charges, stating that Rees had at first been reassigned to a new position due to complaints by senior managers about her job performance, and that she then did not accept the new position she had been offered. However, dispute tribunal justice Judge Coral Shaw ruled that reassigning Rees to a new post was unlawful.

She was portrayed by Vanessa Redgrave in the 2010 feature film The Whistleblower.

== Awards ==
Rees was appointed Officer of the Order of the British Empire (OBE) in the 2014 Birthday Honours for services to human rights, particularly women's rights, and international peace and security.

== See also ==
- List of peace activists
