= Mrs. Caliban =

Book by Rachel Ingalls

Mrs Caliban
- Cover of the Harvard Common Press 2009 printing of Mrs. Caliban
- Author: Rachel Ingalls
- Language: English
- Genre: Fantasy novel
- Publisher: Harvard Common Press
- Publication date: 1982
- Publication place: America
- Pages: 125 pages
- ISBN: 9780876451120
- OCLC: 802904945
- Dewey Decimal: 813.54
- LC Class: PS3559.N38 M7 1983

Mrs. Caliban (1982) is a novella by Rachel Ingalls. The plot concerns a lonely housewife who finds companionship with an amphibious sea monster named Larry. The book was reissued in 2017.

== Reception ==
The novella saw little critical or commercial success upon release until 1986, when it was named by the British Book Marketing Council as one of the top 20 American novels of the post-World War II period.

The novella has received praise from notable authors Ursula K. Le Guin, Joyce Carol Oates, Daniel Handler, and Eleanor Catton. The author John Updike praises the book for being "So deft and austere in its prose, so drolly casual in its fantasy. . . . An impeccable parable, beautifully written from first paragraph to last."
