= Café de Flore (film) =

- Film poster
- Directed by: Jean-Marc Vallée
- Written by: Jean-Marc Vallée
- Screenplay by: Jean-Marc Vallée
- Produced by: Nicolas Coppermann; Pierre Even; Marie-Claude Poulin
- Starring: Vanessa Paradis; Kevin Parent; Hélène Florent; Evelyne Brochu
- Cinematography: Pierre Cottereau
- Edited by: Jean-Marc Vallée
- Distributed by: Alliance Films (Canada) TF1 Séries Films (France)
- Release dates: 2 September 2011 (Venice Film Festival); 12 September 2011 (TIFF)
- Running time: 120 minutes
- Country: Canada
- Language: French
- Budget: CAD$10 million

Café de Flore (French pronunciation: [kafe d(ə) flɔʁ]) is a Canadian drama film, released in 2011. Directed, written, and edited by Jean-Marc Vallée, the film garnered 13 nominations for the 2012 Genie Awards. The film's title refers not to the café on Boulevard Saint-Germain in Paris, but to a Matthew Herbert song of the same name which the film uses to represent its musical current.

== Plot ==
The film cuts between two seemingly unrelated stories. One, set in present-day Montreal, focuses on Antoine, a successful club DJ torn between his new girlfriend Rose and his still-complicated relationship with his childhood friend and ex-wife Carole; the other, set in 1960s Paris, features Jacqueline, the fiercely protective single mother of Laurent, a child with Down syndrome who has a crush on Véronique, a friend and companion who also has Down syndrome.

The film builds toward the revelation of how the two stories are linked: after Jacqueline, Laurent, and Véronique are killed in a car accident, Carole, Antoine, and Rose are their subsequent reincarnations.

== Cast ==
- Vanessa Paradis as Jacqueline
- Kevin Parent as Antoine
  - Émile Vallée as fourteen-year-old Antoine
- Evelyne Brochu as Rose
- Hélène Florent as Carole
  - Chanel Fontaine as fourteen-year-old Carole
- Marin Gerrier as Laurent
- Alice Dubois as Véronique
- Nicolas Marié as Véronique's Father
- Évelyne de la Chenelière as Amélie
- Pascal Elso as Paul
- Jérôme Kircher as Louis
- Joanny Corbeil-Picher as Juliette
- Rosalie Fortier as Angéline
- Michel Dumont as Julien Godin
- Linda Smith as Louise Godin

A small (last credit on screen) but important role is "la médium", played by Emmanuelle Beaugrand-Champagne. She helps Carole understand that her recurring dreams of a young mongoloid (word used in the dialogue) boy, and of a horrendous car crash, are the memories from when she was Jacqueline, going through her own emotional trauma that her love for Laurent (Carole for Antoine) was being displaced by his love for Véronique (Rose).

== Production ==
=== Filming ===
Café de Flore was shot in Montréal and Paris, from 16 August 2010 until 19 November 2010. In Paris, a scene was filmed on the Boulevard Saint-Germain in front of the actual Café de Flore.

=== Soundtrack ===
Café de Flore's multi-genre soundtrack includes songs from the Cure, Sigur Ros, Creedence Clearwater Revival and Pink Floyd. By fusing modern electronic and avant-garde elements with old world orchestral sounds, the music connects the two major time periods of the film.

The film borrows its title from the electronic-tinged "Café de Flore", a song written and performed by British musician Matthew Herbert in 2000. The song is used throughout the film to represent and reinforce its central themes.

Café de Flore features two a capella performances: an a capella rendition of the Cure's "Just Like Heaven" performed by Florent and Parent, and a cover of Herbert's "Café de Flore" performed by Paradis, Brochu and Les Petits Chanteurs du Mont Royal.

Vallée had originally planned to put Led Zeppelin's "Stairway to Heaven" on the soundtrack, but lead singer Robert Plant turned down its use.

== Reception ==
=== Critical response ===
Rotten Tomatoes gives the film a score of 64% based on reviews from 55 critics, with an average rating of 6.4/10.

In Canada, Café de Flore was generally well received by critics. CineAction critic Alsegul Koc describes Valleé's film as "the aftershocks of an amorous earthquake"; a story which "amplifies the horrors and joys of letting go and starting anew". He admires the film's ability to delve into deeper, more emotionally vulnerable areas of the human psyche than conventional love stories. The Globe and Mail critic Guy Dixon gives the film 3.5 out of 4 stars, describing it as "beautiful" and "intricate", and applauds the performance of Florent, who, in his view, played a large role in weaving the two story lines together. Mary Corliss, writing for Time magazine, echoes praise for Florent's as well as Paradis' performance, calling them "luminous". She also acclaims Vallée's offbeat cinematic style, nothing that although "the viewer will have to leap with Vallée, his film is so sure-footed, emotionally and cinematically, that that risky step seems like walking on air in a beautiful dream". Jay Stone from Postmedia News gives the film four out of five stars, noting Vallée's ability to use music to craft a story of unfailing love. He calls the Montréal filmmaker a "visual storyteller" who "creates montages linked by their emotional colours".

While Café de Flore was generally well recognized by the Canadian film community, the film obtained mediocre reviews and low turnouts in France. The film, which attracted a promising 45 critics upon its initial theatrical début, ultimately grossed fewer than 85,000 total viewings. In a Téléjournal broadcast, Claude Fugère sums up the general opinion of Télérama critics, who called the film a "vaguely esoteric melodrama chock-full of clichés on life, love and death ... a disappointment from the director of the excellent C.R.A.Z.Y.. In a similar tone, Hubert Lizé, writing for Le Parisien, gives the film one out of five stars, calling Vallée's work "overly ambitious" and his character development "tiresome" and "frustrating". Danielle Attali, writing for Le Journal du Dimanche, gives the film the same rating, calling the plot "convoluted" and "frustrating". In a mixed review, Le Monde critic praises Paradis' performance but notes that "for her [Paradis'] sake, we should be irritated by the film's far-fetched concoction of a dual story line ... a far cry from being 'mysterious' or 'mystical'." In contrast to other Parisian reviewers, Mathieu Carratier from Première gives the film 3.75/4 stars, praising Vallée music selection by comparing him to a "DJ who mixes different paths together to better grasp the stories which they tell".

Critic Ginette Vincendeau gives Café de Flore a mixed review, noting that within the film, "there are convincing and emotionally potent moments ... the film is at its best on this register of intimate realism" but that "it is less good when grandstanding on cliché concepts such as the 'perfect soulmate', or the more excessive manifestations of love, maternal or romantic". The Sight & Sound critic concludes her review by stating that though the film attempts to connect two stories in different time periods, the "convoluted leaps in time and space often make the film difficult to follow, and in danger of appearing pretentious rather than sophisticated". The Guardian's Mike McCahill rates the film one out of five stars, calling Vallée's film a "narcissistic", "fundamentally unpersuasive", "head-in-the-clouds" drama with a revelation that may "prove to be the most stupid love twist of the decade".

American reviews were also mixed. Charles Cassady, a reviewer from Video Librarian, gives the film three out of three stars, uplifting its "bittersweet mise-en-scène, which thankfully never tips into horror/suspense or becomes carried away with f/x, instead offering a mature and wise (if a little male wish-fulfillment-tinged) take on themes of 'soulmates' and the limitations of love". Variety's Boyd van Hoeij salutes the film's casting, but deems Café de Flore unoriginal, noting that "Vallée has taken what made C.R.A.Z.Y so successful, and simply tried to replicate it on a slightly larger scale. [Occasionally] similarities between the films ... are so striking it almost feels like Vallée's ripping himself off".

=== Accolades ===
Award	Date	Category	Recipient	Result	Ref(s)
Genie Awards	2012	Best Motion Picture	Jean-Marc Vallée, Marie-Claude Poulin, Pierre Even	Nominated	
Genie Awards	2012	Best Director	Jean-Marc Vallée	Nominated	
Genie Awards	2012	Best Actress	Vanessa Paradis	Won	
Genie Awards	2012	Best Supporting Actor	Marin Gerrier	Nominated	
Genie Awards	2012	Best Supporting Actress	Hélène Florent	Nominated	
Genie Awards	2012	Best Original Screenplay	Jean-Marc Vallée	Nominated	
Genie Awards	2012	Best Art Direction/Production Design	Patrice Vermette	Nominated	
Genie Awards	2012	Best Cinematography	Pierre Cottereau	Nominated	
Genie Awards	2012	Best Costume Design	Ginette Magny, Emmanuelle Youchnovski	Nominated	
Genie Awards	2012	Best Overall Sound	Jean Minondo, Jo Caron, Gavin Fernandes, Louis Gignac	Nominated	
Genie Awards	2012	Best Sound Editing	Martin Pinsonnault, Blaise Blanchier, Simon Meilleur, Mireille Morin, Luc Raymond	Nominated	
Genie Awards	2012	Best Makeup	Christiane Fattori, Frédéric Marin	Won	
Genie Awards	2012	Best Visual Effects	Vincent Dudouet, Cynthia Mourou, Éric Normandin, Martin Pensa, Marc Cote, Stephanie Broussaud, Sylvain Theroux, Luc Sansfacon, Nathalie Tremblay, Garry Chuntz	Won	
Jutra Awards	2012	Best Director	Jean-Marc Vallée	Nominated	
Jutra Awards	2012	Best Actress	Vanessa Paradis	Won	
Jutra Awards	2012	Best Art Direction	Patrice Vermette	Won	
Jutra Awards	2012	Best Cinematography	Pierre Cottereau	Won	
Jutra Awards	2012	Best Hairstyling	Ghislaine Sant, Frédéric Brault	Nominated	
Jutra Awards	2012	Best Makeup	Christiane Fattori, Frédéric Marin	Nominated	
Jutra Awards	2012	Most Successful Film Outside Quebec	Jean-Marc Vallée	Nominated	
Vancouver Film Critics Circle	2011	Best Canadian Film	Jean-Marc Vallée	Won	
Vancouver Film Critics Circle	2011	Best Director of a Canadian Film	Jean-Marc Vallée	Nominated	
Vancouver Film Critics Circle	2011	Best Actress in a Canadian Film	Vanessa Paradis	Nominated	
Vancouver Film Critics Circle	2011	Best Supporting Actress in a Canadian Film	Hélène Florent	Nominated	
