= Daniel Paisner =

American journalist and author (born 1959)

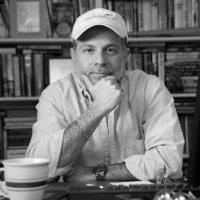
- Born: December 12, 1959 (age 66)
- Education: Tufts University; Boston University
- Occupations: Author, ghostwriter
- Website: http://www.danielpaisner.com/

Daniel Paisner (born December 12, 1959) is an American journalist, author, and podcaster. He is best known for his work as a ghostwriter and collaborator. He has published more than eighty books, including seventeen New York Times best-sellers. He is also the author of four novels, and several works of non-fiction. His novel Balloon Dog was published by Koehler Books in 2022; his previous novel A Single Happened Thing was published by Relegation Books in 2016. His non-fiction books include Show: The Making and Unmaking of a Network Television Pilot - "a devastating chronicle of an aborted television series," according the Publishers Weekly. The book was reissued in a new edition, with a new foreword, by Cutting Edge Books, in 2023. He is also the author of The Ball: Mark McGwire's 70th Home Run Ball and the Marketing of the American Dream, which was published by Viking in 1999 and hailed by ESPN.com as "one of the great quirky masterpieces of baseball journalism." His best-selling collaborations include The Girl in the Green Sweater: A Life in Holocaust's Shadow (2008), The Power of Broke (2016), and Last Man Down (2002).

Paisner hosts the podcast As Told To, in which he interviews other authors about their experiences ghostwriting and collaborating with notable figures. The podcast, currently in its fifth season, has featured long-form interviews with journalists, novelists, songwriters, speechwriters and other artists and creatives who often work in service of someone else's voice or vision.

== Early life ==
Paisner graduated from Tufts University with a B.A. in English in 1982, before receiving an M.A. in Journalism from Boston University.

== Career ==
In 2006, Paisner collaborated with Holly Robinson Peete on the book Get Your Own Damn Beer, I'm Watching the Game!: A Woman's Guide to Loving Pro Football, which won that year's Quill Award in the Sports category. He co-wrote Ivanka Trump's first self-help book, The Trump Card: Playing to Win in Work and Life, published in October 2009.

In 2011, Paisner collaborated with baseball umpire Jim Joyce and pitcher Armando Galarraga on a book about Galarraga's near perfect game. On June 2, 2010, Joyce called a play incorrectly, preventing Galarraga from pitching a perfect game. Following the release of the book, Nobody's Perfect: Two Men, One Call, and a Game for Baseball History, MLB did not allow Joyce to work any games in which Galarraga would be playing, to avoid any appearance of impropriety due to their business relationship.

In 2016, with Daymond John, the founder and CEO of FUBU, Paisner released The Power of Broke, a motivational business book that features stories from 15 entrepreneurs, including Steve Aoki, Rob Dyrdek, Kevin Plank, and Loren Ridinger. It appeared on The Wall Street Journal and The New York Times bestseller lists, and received an NAACP Image Award for Outstanding Instructional Literary Work.
