= Eilis Kirwan =

Irish film director and screenwriter (born 1972)

Eilis Kirwan is an Irish film director and screenwriter who was nominated for the Genie Award for Best Original Screenplay for the 2010 film The Whistleblower along with Larysa Kondracki. Born in Dublin, in 1972, Kirwan also won an Ardmore Studios Award at the 2004 Kerry Film Festival and won the 2004 Galway Film Fleadh Short Film Award for Best First Short both for 2004's Nostradamus and Me. She studied English and History at University College Dublin then co-founded Doubletake Theatre Company where she wrote and produced original plays.
