= Ryan Redford =

Canadian film director and screenwriter

Ryan Redford is a Canadian film director and screenwriter, best known for his debut feature film Oliver Sherman. He was a Genie Award nominee for Best Adapted Screenplay at the 32nd Genie Awards.

Born in Vancouver, British Columbia, Redford studied film at York University. He wrote and directed several short films, including Murmur, The Unstrung Ear, Song of Wreckage and Lake, before working on Oliver Sherman.
