= Ryan Ward (actor) =

Canadian actor, film director and screenwriter

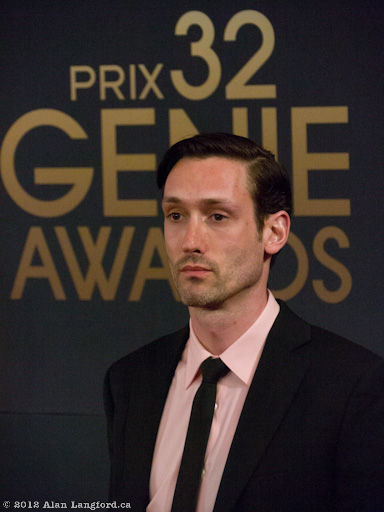
Ward in 2012

Ryan Ward (born January 2, 1979) is a Canadian actor, film director and screenwriter. He is best known for his debut feature film as a director, Son of the Sunshine, for which Ward and Matthew Heiti were shortlisted Genie Award nominees for Best Original Screenplay at the 32nd Genie Awards in 2012.

Originally from Winnipeg, Manitoba, he now splits his time between Winnipeg and Los Angeles. As an actor, he had primarily supporting roles in films, including Nostradamus, We Ate the Children Last and Sidekick, prior to Son of the Sunshine, as well as a long-running stage role in the original Off-Broadway and Toronto productions of Evil Dead The Musical for which he was nominated for a Dora Mavor Moore Award.

He has also directed the short films In the Beginning was Water and Sky (PBS, National Film Board of Canada), Amerika, Time Traveling Through Time, and Our Secret.

In 2023, Ward released Daughter of the Sun, a sequel to Son of the Sunshine.
