= 75 Watts =

- Directed by: John Cullen
- Produced by: John Cullen
- Starring: Matt Giordano
- Cinematography: John Cullen
- Edited by: Paul Proulx
- Production company: Buck Productions
- Release date: April 29, 2011 (Hot Docs)
- Running time: 13 minutes
- Country: Canada

75 Watts is a Canadian short documentary film, directed by John Cullen and released in 2011. The film centres on Matt Giordano, a drummer from Denver, Colorado who has Tourette syndrome, which he describes as being like "a 75-watt lightbulb that's been plugged into a thousand-watt outlet", and profiles his efforts to cope with the challenges of the condition through music.

The film premiered at the 2011 Hot Docs Canadian International Documentary Festival. It was screened at the Palm Springs International Festival of Short Films in June, where it won the award for Best Documentary Short.

The film was a Genie Award nominee for Best Short Documentary Film at the 32nd Genie Awards.
