= Son of the Sunshine =

- Directed by: Ryan Ward
- Written by: Ryan Ward; Matthew Heiti
- Produced by: Paul Fler
- Starring: Ryan Ward; Shantelle Canzanese; Rebecca McMahon; JoAnn Nordstrom
- Production companies: Heart Shaped Movies; Pangaea Pictures; Last Call Productions
- Release dates: January 18, 2009 (Slamdance Film Festival); October 14, 2011 (Canada)
- Running time: 88 minutes
- Country: Canada
- Language: English

Son of the Sunshine is a Canadian supernatural drama film. Directed by Ryan Ward and written by Ward and Matthew Heiti, the film stars Ward as Sonny Johnns, a young man with Tourette syndrome who undergoes an experimental surgical procedure to cure the condition, only to discover that he also loses his supernatural ability to heal others.

The film premiered at Slamdance Film Festival and other film festivals in 2009, and had a general release in 2011.

In 2023 Ward released Daughter of the Sun, a film which has been billed as a continuation of Son of the Sunshine.

== Critical response ==
The film received 3.5 out of 4 stars from both the Toronto Star and the National Post.

== Awards and nominations ==
Ward and Heiti received a Genie Award nomination for Best Original Screenplay at the 32nd Genie Awards in 2012. Ward won the Best Actor Rising Star Award at the 2009 Edmonton International Film Festival, and the film won the Audience Award for Best Feature at the 2009 Malibu Film Festival.
