= Rachel Ingalls =

American writer (1940–2019)

- Born: Rachel Holmes Ingalls; 13 May 1940; Boston, Massachusetts, U.S.
- Died: 6 March 2019 (aged 78); London, England
- Education: Radcliffe College (BA)
- Occupation: Novelist
- Writing career
- Period: 1970–2019
- Notable work: Mrs. Caliban

Rachel Holmes Ingalls (13 May 1940 – 6 March 2019) was an American-born author who had lived in the United Kingdom from 1965 onwards. She won the 1970 Authors' Club First Novel Award for Theft. Her novella Mrs. Caliban was published in 1982, and her final book of stories Days Like Today in 2000.

Ingalls's short story "Last Act: The Madhouse" inspired the story of the character Jean in the 1997 film Chinese Box by Wayne Wang.

== Biography ==
Ingalls was born on 13 May 1940, in Boston and grew up in Cambridge, Massachusetts where her father was a professor at Harvard. She received her B. A. degree from Radcliffe College in 1964, and emigrated to England.

She was the daughter of Phyllis (née Day) and the late Sanskritist Daniel Henry Holmes Ingalls, Sr., and the sister of the computer scientist Dan Ingalls.

Ingalls died from multiple myeloma under hospice care in London on 6 March 2019, at age 78.

== Literary reputation ==
Ingalls' reputation is characterised by deep admiration and acclaim but also a certain degree of obscurity. She referred to her limited commercial success as being due to the ''very odd, unsaleable length" of her books, which tend to be story collections or novellas. She was awarded the Authors' Club First Novel Award for her book Theft. In 1986 the British Book Marketing Council named the hitherto little-known Mrs Caliban (1982) as one of the 20 greatest American novels since World War II, sparking wider interest in both book and writer. Earlier praise for Mrs Caliban came from John Updike. The writer Daniel Handler is an advocate of Ingalls' work. In an overview of her work for Book Post, Joy Williams wrote, "[Ingalls] had a keen sense of the unrealness of people and event, the questionableness at the heart of the world."

== Bibliography ==
=== Books and story collections (first editions) ===
- Theft (1970). London: Faber & Faber. ISBN 0571094775.
- Theft and The Man Who Was Left Behind (1970). Boston: Gambit. No ISBN.
- Mediterranean Cruise (1973). Boston: Gambit. ISBN 9780876450819.
- Mrs Caliban (1982). London: Faber & Faber. ISBN 0571118267.
- Mrs Caliban (1983). Boston: Gambit. ISBN 9780876451120.
- Binstead’s Safari (1983). London: Faber & Faber. ISBN 057113016X.
- Three of a Kind (1985). London: Faber & Faber. ISBN 0571136060.
- I See a Long Journey (1985). New York: Simon & Schuster. ISBN 9780671627829.
- The Pearlkillers (1986). London: Faber & Faber. ISBN 0571137954.
- The Pearlkillers (1986). New York: Simon & Schuster. ISBN 9780671633400.
- The End of Tragedy (1987). London: Faber & Faber. ISBN 0571148409.
- Binstead’s Safari (1988). New York: Simon & Schuster. ISBN 9780671659530.
- Black Diamond (1992). London: Faber & Faber. ISBN 0571162789.
- Days Like Today (2000). London: Faber & Faber. ISBN 0571201105.

=== Lifetime selected and compiled editions ===
- The Man Who Was Left Behind and Other Stories (1974). London: Faber & Faber. ISBN 0571104800. (Compilation. Comprises one story from Theft and The Man Who Was Left Behind and two stories from Mediterranean Cruise.)
- Four Stories (1987). London: Faber & Faber. ISBN 0571145469. (Compilation. Comprises two stories from Three of a Kind and two from The Pearlkillers.)
- Something To Write Home About (1988). Boston: Harvard Common Press. ISBN 9780916782986. (Omnibus edition. Comprises Theft and The Man Who Was Left Behind and Mediterranean Cruise.)
- Be My Guest (1992). New York: Random House. ISBN 9780679413004. (Comprises two stories from Black Diamond.)
- Mrs Caliban and Other Stories (1993). London: Faber & Faber. ISBN 0571164145. (Omnibus edition. Comprises Mrs Caliban, Three of a Kind and The End of Tragedy.)
- Times Like These (2005). Saint Paul, Minn.: Graywolf Press. ISBN 9781555974312. (Compilation. Comprises two stories from Black Diamond and one from Days Like Today.)
- Three Masquerades: Novellas (2017). Berkeley: Counterpoint Press. ISBN 9781940436449. (Compilation introduced by Daniel Handler. Comprises two stories from Three of a Kind and one from The End of Tragedy.)

=== Posthumous editions and compilations ===
- In the Act (2023). New York: New Directions Publishing. ISBN 9780811232043.
- No Love Lost: Selected Novellas (2023). London: Faber & Faber. ISBN 9780571376582. (Compilation introduced by Patricia Lockwood. Comprises Theft, one story from Mediterranean Cruise, two from Three of a Kind, one from The Pearlkillers, two from The End of Tragedy and one from Days Like Today.)
