= Chaim Widawski =

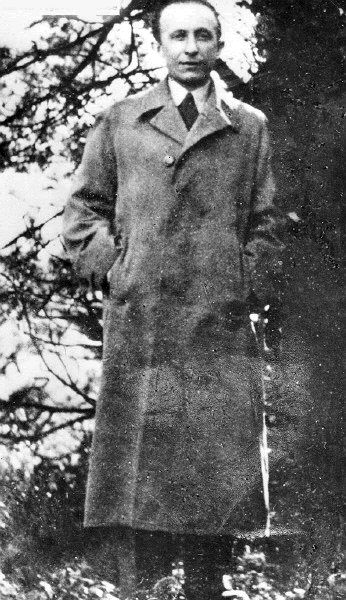
Chaim Natan Widawski

Chaim Widawski (c. 1906—June 1944) was a popular Zionist activist in the Łódź Ghetto during World War II.

After the German takeover of Poland, the Nazis confiscated personal radios from Jews and Poles, and their possession was made punishable by death. Widawski and the group he led managed to hide several radio sets, which were then used for monitoring and dissemination of news coverage about the developments of the war to the ghetto. The ghetto inhabitants were told of the Warsaw Ghetto Uprising in the spring of 1943 and a year later, while the Łódź Ghetto still existed, commemorated its anniversary. Two months before the liquidations of the ghetto, the ghetto learned of the Normandy landings by the Allies, thanks in part to Widawski. The joyous atmosphere which resulted however, led the Germans to realize that the only way that Łódź's Jews could know about this event was via illegal radios.

In June 1944 the Gestapo was tipped off by an informant and this led to the arrest of most of the members of the group, including Widawski. Widawski actually managed to escape from Gestapo prison, but expecting that he would be caught again, committed suicide via cyanide poisoning for fear that he would divulge—under torture—the names of his co-conspirators.

The Łódź Ghetto was "liquidated" by the Germans in August 1944.

Chaim Widawski served as inspiration for the protagonist of the novel Jacob the Liar.
