= Roxana Condurache =

Romanian actress

Roxana Condurache (born August 28, 1987 in Iași) is a Romanian actress. She garnered a Genie Award nomination for Best Supporting Actress at the 32nd Genie Awards, for her performance in the Canadian film The Whistleblower.
