= Kathryn Bolkovac =

American human rights advocate and former police investigator

- Born: 1960 or 1961 (age 64–65); Ohio, United States
- Years active: 1999–present
- Movement: Human trafficking
- Website: bolkovac.org

Kathryn Bolkovac (born 1960 or 1961) is an American human rights advocate, consultant, former police investigator with the Lincoln Police Department, and former monitor with United Nations International Police Task Force in Bosnia and Herzegovina. She came to prominence when she sued her employers for unfair dismissal after she lost her job following her attempts to expose sex trafficking in Bosnia. Her story was shown in the film The Whistleblower and told in the nonfiction book, The Whistleblower.

== Bosnia ==
Bolkovac, who is of Croatian heritage, left the Lincoln Police Department in 1999 and signed a contract with DynCorp Aerospace, a British subsidiary of US based DynCorp International. DynCorp had a $15 million UN-related contract to hire and train police officers for duty in Bosnia. After a week at the company's training facility in Fort Worth, Texas, Bolkovac was sent to Sarajevo, Bosnia where she worked as a human rights investigator for three months. She was then moved to Zenica, 70 km (43 mi) north of Sarajevo to work on a specialist case aimed at fighting violence against women.

In July 2001, Bolkovac filed a lawsuit in Great Britain against DynCorp for unfair dismissal after a protected disclosure (whistleblowing). They had claimed she was fired for falsifying time sheets. On August 2, 2002, the tribunal unanimously ruled in her favour. She reported that fellow DynCorp officers were paying for prostitutes, raping underage girls and participating in sex trafficking. While locals were prosecuted, any UN contractors involved had immunity from prosecution in Bosnia, although a number of these officers were forced to resign and leave the country, under suspicion of illegal activity. Madeleine Rees, Head of Office in the region for the Office of the United Nations High Commissioner for Human Rights, testified in her support. In November 2002, an employment tribunal ordered DynCorp to pay Bolkovac £110,221 in damages. She stated that the case settlement “didn't really even cover expenses”. The US Government continued their contract with DynCorp.

== Later career and activism ==
In 2015, Bolkovac graduated with a degree in political science from University of Nebraska–Lincoln. Also in that year, she was nominated for a Nobel Peace Prize.

She has continued to work against human trafficking and violence against women, and is a public speaker addressing trafficking, ethics and anti-corruption issues. Bolkovac has stated that she doesn't consider herself an activist but “more of an advocate for change“. She designed and taught a masters level course at the University for Peace. In 2020 she began working on launching a human rights curriculum for middle and high school students.

== Personal life ==
Bolkovac has three children from her first marriage, two daughters and a son. In 1999 she met Jan, a police officer for the Dutch Government, with whom she worked in Bosnia, and the two had a 12-year relationship.

== Popular media ==
Bolkovac's story was made into a film, The Whistleblower, starring Rachel Weisz as Bolkovac. It was released in 2010. Following a screening of the film, UN Secretary-General Ban Ki-moon opened a panel discussion on sexual exploitation and abuse in conflict and post-conflict situations. The filmmaker and senior UN officials addressed issues raised in the film, including human trafficking and forced prostitution as well as the organisation's effort to combat sexual exploitation of women and children.

Bolkovac has also co-authored a 2011 book with Cari Lynn, The Whistleblower: Sex Trafficking, Military Contractors and One Woman's Fight for Justice.

== See also ==
- Child sexual abuse by UN peacekeepers
