= Larysa Kondracki =

Canadian film director and screenwriter

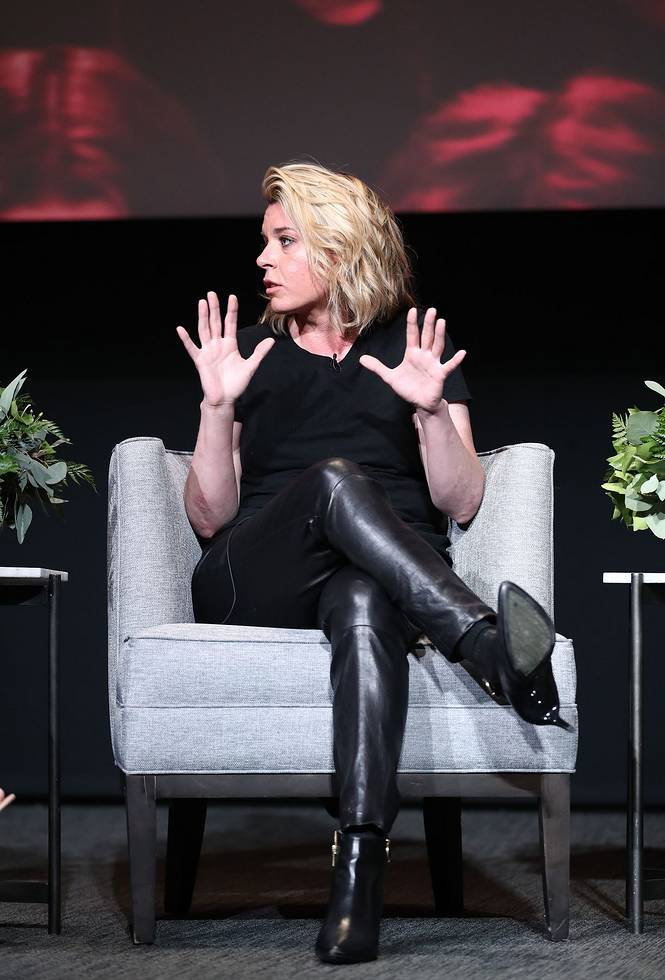
- Born: Toronto, Ontario, Canada
- Education: McGill University; Columbia University
- Occupations: producer, director, screenwriter

Larysa Kondracki is a Canadian producer, director and screenwriter. Her debut feature film, The Whistleblower, was released in 2011 and received nominations for six Genies at the 32nd Genie Awards, including Best Picture and Best Director. She has received international accolades for reporting on the stories of victims of trafficking in the former Yugoslavia.

== Life ==
Kondracki is originally from Toronto, born into a Ukrainian-Canadian family; she studied English literature and theatre at McGill University, graduating in 1999. She later completed a second BA in film directing at Columbia University, graduating in 2001. She also studied at the MFA in film program at Columbia University School of the Arts until 2006.

Based in Los Angeles, Kondracki has written projects for Focus Features, HBO Films, Participant Media, and Showtime Entertainment, among others.

== Work ==
Kondracki's career kicked off with her breakout short film, "Viko," about a seventeen-year-old boy in Yugoslavia, who, struggling to earn money for a new life with his girlfriend, finds himself tangled in a web of sex trafficking. "Viko"'s success in the film festival circuit brought Kondracki long success as a director and storyteller.

Kondracki's debut feature film, The Whistleblower, is a based-on-truth crime drama about Kathryn Bolkovac, "who, while working in Bosnia with a private US military contractor under UN jurisdiction, uncovered sex-slavery rings, implicating local police, a number of her colleagues and other foreign nationals.” Kondracki said to Indie Wire, about the crime thriller storytelling style she chose: "When you put together the words Bosnia, peacekeepers and sex-trafficking, people assume it’s going to be either 'educational' or 'important,' in other words: medicinal. But the truth is, Kathy’s story was incredible. It brought to mind my favorite political thrillers, and I felt it lent itself to that kind of telling.”

Kondracki spoke about her effort to portray the "exhaustion" of inflicting violence in an interview with FF2 Media's Jan Lisa Huttner. "In some of the reviews we've gotten, they say that The Whistleblower is too black and white, and it's just evil, and this and that. But I don't see it as a black and white thing: there are good women and bad men, and good men and bad women, and we did that on purpose because it isn't so black and white.”

The Whistleblower was nominated for six Genie Awards, and nominated for major awards at the Seattle International Film Festival and the Palm Springs International Film Festival. It signaled Kondracki's role as an activist and advocate for women. "I think the movie has a relevance beyond just making one think," said Kondracki to The Coast Halifax. "I plan to be a large pest.”

Kondracki has since directed and produced episodes of many television shows, among them The Walking Dead, Better Call Saul, Rogue, The Americans, and Graceland.

In 2015, Nimbus publishing announced that the film rights for the book Haunted Girl: Esther Cox and the Great Amherst Mystery by Laurie Glenn Norris had been sold to a project led by Kondracki.

In 2018, Kondracki signed a First Look television deal with Amazon. Kondracki directed episodes of the TV series Picnic at Hanging Rock, which involved her in an Australian nationalist debate about direction for the iconic Australian story.

== Filmography ==
Film

Year	Title	Director	Writer	Notes
2009	Viko	Yes	Yes	Short film
2010	The Whistleblower	Yes	Yes	

Television

Year	Title	Notes
2015	The Americans	Season 3, Episode 10: "Stingers"
2015	Better Call Saul	2 episodes
2015	The Walking Dead	Season 5, Episode 11: "The Distance"
2015	Reign	Season 2, Episode 12: "Banished"
2014–2015	Halt and Catch Fire	2 episodes
2014	The Divide	Season 1, Episode 8: "To Whom Evil Is Done"
2014	Graceland	Season 2, Episode 10: "The Head of the Pig"
2013–2014	Covert Affairs	3 episodes
2013–2014	Rogue	6 episodes
2013	Copper	7 episode Also executive producer (13 episodes)
2016	Gotham	Season 2, Episode 19: "Azrael"
2017	Legion	Season 1, Episode 4: "Chapter 4"
2018	Picnic at Hanging Rock	3 episodes, showrunner
2019	The Fix	Season 1, Episode 1: "Pilot"
2022	Power Book IV: Force	Season 1, Episode 1: "A Short Fuse and a Long Term Memory"
2025	Devil in Disguise: John Wayne Gacy	2 episodes
