= David F. Shamoon =

Canadian screenwriter

David F. Shamoon is a Canadian screenwriter, best known for his screenplay for the film In Darkness (2011). Directed by Agnieszka Holland, the film was nominated for the Academy Award for Best Foreign Language Film in 2012.

== Life and career ==
Shamoon was born and raised in India, the son of Iraqi-Jewish refugees of the 1941 Farhud in Baghdad. He attended Cathedral School in Mumbai (now the Cathedral & John Connon School). His family moved to Iran, where he attended Community School, Tehran). He moved to the United States for college, graduating from Boston University in 1970. That year he moved to Canada.

Shamoon successfully worked in advertising for many years before trying screenwriting, first as a hobby, but eventually as a career. He studied the craft under veteran story editor Nika Rylski and wrote several scripts, some of which were optioned. In Darkness, based on Robert Marshall's book In the Sewers of Lvov (1991), marked his first attempt to adapt a book for film. Shamoon garnered a Genie Award nomination for Best Adapted Screenplay at the 32nd Genie Awards.

Shamoon has since tackled several new projects which are in various stages of development.
