= The Whistleblower =

2010 Canadian-German thriller film directed by Larysa Kondracki

- Promotional poster
- Directed by: Larysa Kondracki
- Written by: Larysa Kondracki; Eilis Kirwan
- Produced by: Christina Piovesan; Amy Kaufman; Celine Rattray; Benito Mueller; Wolfgang Mueller
- Starring: Rachel Weisz; David Strathairn; Nikolaj Lie Kaas; Anna Anissimova; Monica Bellucci; Vanessa Redgrave
- Cinematography: Kieran McGuigan
- Edited by: Julian Clarke
- Music by: Mychael Danna
- Production company: Voltage Pictures
- Distributed by: Entertainment One (Canada); SquareOne Entertainment (Germany); Samuel Goldwyn Films (United States)
- Release dates: 13 September 2010 (TIFF); 12 August 2011 (Canada); 27 October 2011 (Germany)
- Running time: 112 minutes
- Countries: Canada; Germany
- Language: English
- Box office: $2.2 million

The Whistleblower is a 2010 Canadian biographical drama film directed by Larysa Kondracki and starring Rachel Weisz. Kondracki and Eilis Kirwan wrote the screenplay, which was inspired by the story of Kathryn Bolkovac, a Nebraska police officer who was recruited as a United Nations peacekeeper for DynCorp International in post-war Bosnia and Herzegovina in 1999. While there, she discovered a Bosnian sex trafficking ring serving and facilitated by DynCorp employees, with international peacekeepers looking the other way. Bolkovac was fired and forced out of the country after attempting to shut down the ring. She took the story to BBC News in the UK and won a wrongful dismissal lawsuit against DynCorp.

Kondracki wanted her debut film to concern human trafficking, and she encountered Bolkovac's story in college. She and Kirwan struggled to obtain financial support for the project. Eight years after Kondracki decided to produce the film, she secured funding and cast Weisz in the lead role. The Whistleblower— a co-production of Canada, Germany, and the United States— was filmed in Romania from October to December 2009.

The Whistleblower premiered on 13 September 2010 at the Toronto International Film Festival, and Samuel Goldwyn Films distributed the film in theaters in the United States. The film was advertised as a fictionalization of events occurring during the late 1990s. Kondracki said that the facts are broadly accurate, but some details were omitted for the film; for example, a three-week "breaking-in" period for trafficking victims was not shown.

The film received mixed reviews. The performances by Weisz and her co-stars were praised, but the intense violence depicted in several scenes was debated by critics, with some calling it exploitative. Kondracki and Weisz responded that what happened in Bosnia had been toned down for the film. The Whistleblower received several awards and nominations, including three nominations at the 2012 Genie Awards. UN Secretary-General Ban Ki-moon hosted a screening of the film and promised action would be taken to prevent further instances of human trafficking. The Guardian reported that other UN officials attempted to downplay the events depicted and that initiatives against trafficking in Bosnia were aborted.

== Plot ==
Kathryn Bolkovac is a police officer from Lincoln, Nebraska, who accepts an offer to work with the UNPOL in post-war Bosnia and Herzegovina for a private contractor called Democra Security (a thinly veiled allusion to DynCorp International). After successfully advocating for a Muslim woman who experienced domestic abuse, Kathryn is appointed head of the department of gender affairs.

Raya, a young Ukrainian woman, and her friend Luba are sold to a Bosnian sex-trafficking ring by a relative. Raya escapes with Irka, another girl forced into prostitution, and they are sent to a women's shelter for victims of human trafficking. While investigating their case, Kathryn uncovers a large-scale sexual slavery ring utilized by international personnel (including Americans).

Kathryn persuades Raya and Irka to testify against their traffickers in court, guaranteeing their safety; however, an indifferent UN official drops Irka at the border between Bosnia and Serbia when she cannot produce a passport. Although Kathryn rescued Irka from the woods, Irka is too afraid to proceed with the trial. Meanwhile, Raya is recaptured by the traffickers after a corrupt peacekeeper tips them off. To deter other girls from running away and talking to the authorities, the traffickers make an example out of Raya by brutally raping her with a metal pipe in front of them.

When she brings the scandal to the attention of the UN, Kathryn discovers that it has been covered up to protect lucrative defense and security contracts. However, she finds allies in her investigation: Madeleine Rees, head of the Human Rights Commission, and internal-affairs specialist Peter Ward. As her investigation continues, Kathryn is met with threats on her answering machine and dead ends when higher-ups override and close all the Internal Affairs cases. Still, she continues to try to find Raya and finally locates her on a raid, but Raya refuses to come with her. A few days later, Raya is found dead, having been shot in the head by one of the traffickers, Ivan.

Kathryn sends an email to fifty senior mission personnel detailing her findings; she is then fired from her job. One night, Kathryn enters Democra Security to gather evidence of the sex trafficking, but is cornered by Ward and another employee. She is forced to hand the evidence to Ward, but it turns out to be a distraction planned by both him and Kathryn. They succeed in escaping before Kathryn is deported from the country where she brings her evidence to BBC News in the UK.

The final credits note that after Kathryn's departure, a number of peacekeepers were sent home (though none faced criminal charges due to immunity laws), and that the U.S. continues doing business with private contractors like Democra Security (including billion-dollar contracts in Iraq and Afghanistan).

== Cast ==
- Rachel Weisz as Kathryn Bolkovac
- David Strathairn as Peter Ward
- Nikolaj Lie Kaas as Jan van der Velde
- Anna Anissimova as Zoe
- Roxana Condurache as Raya
- Monica Bellucci as Laura Leviani
- Vanessa Redgrave as Madeleine Rees
- Paula Schramm as Luba
- Alexandru Potocean as Viko
- William Hope as Blakely
- Rayisa Kondracki as Irka
- Jeanette Hain as Halyna
- Benedict Cumberbatch as Nick Kaufman
- David Hewlett as Fred Murray
- Coca Bloos as Milena
- Luke Treadaway as Jim Higgins
- Liam Cunningham as Bill Hynes
- Pilou Asbæk as Bas

== Production ==
=== Writing ===
There were so many people in the same situation as her. They saw what was going on, and they didn't respond in the way that she did.

— Rachel Weisz on Kathryn Bolkovac

The Whistleblower is based on the experiences of Kathryn Bolkovac, an American police officer who in 1999 was assigned to serve as a peacekeeper with the United Nations in post-war Bosnia. While there, she reportedly discovered a sex-trafficking ring which served and was facilitated by other peacekeepers. Bolkovac was fired after trying to investigate the ring, but later won a wrongful dismissal lawsuit.

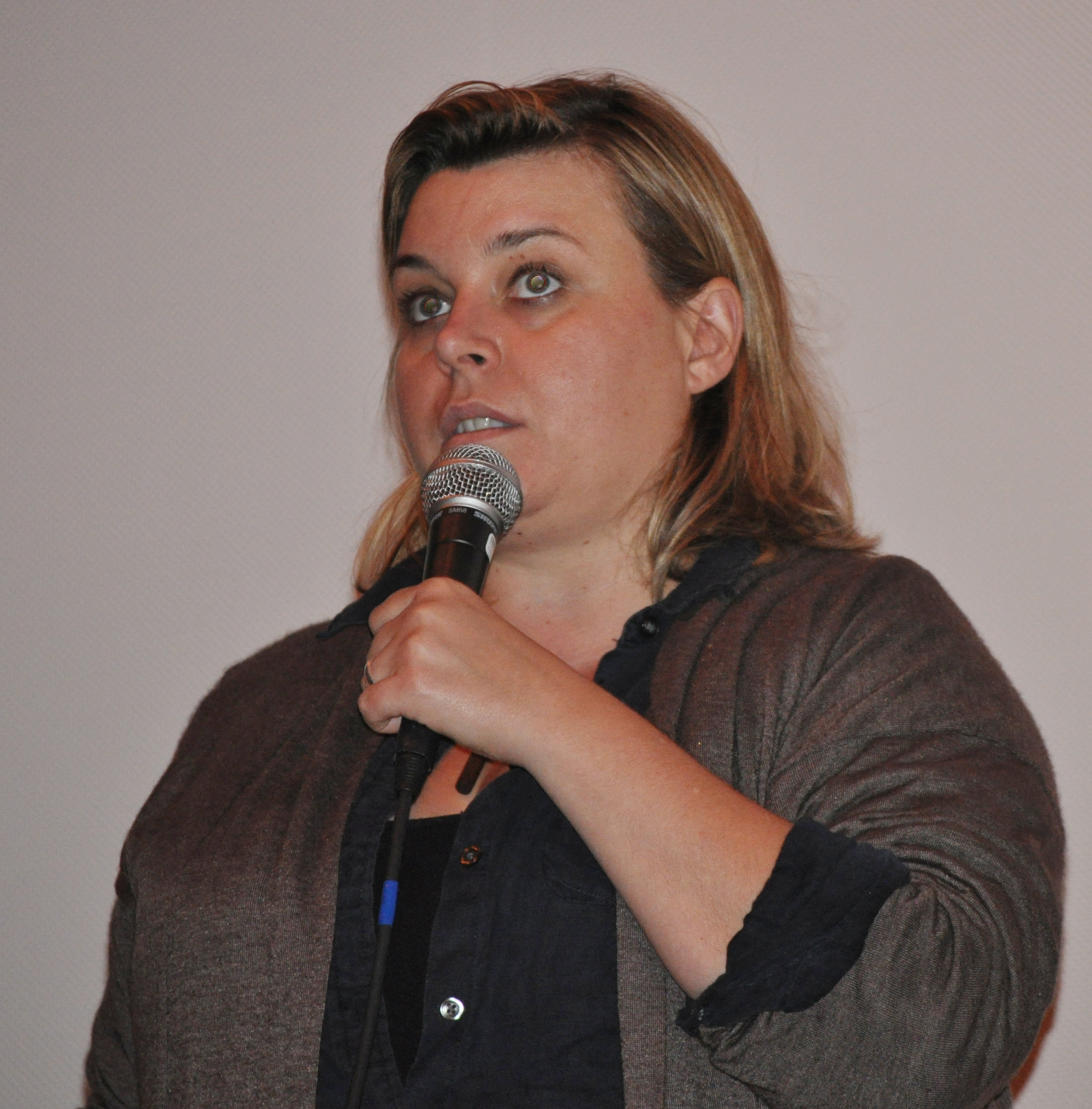
Larysa Kondracki decided to make The Whistleblower after hearing Bolkovac's account of sex trafficking in Bosnia-Herzegovina.

Director Larysa Kondracki and co-screenwriter Eilis Kirwan learned of Bolkovac's story while attending Columbia University, eight years before the film's production. Kondracki subsequently devoted significant time to research human trafficking and the sex trade. After Bolkovac sold her the film rights for $100, she resolved to adapt the story for the screen. Financing for the project was initially difficult to secure, although the situation improved after Rachel Weisz was cast as Bolkovac. "I was young and naïve," Kondracki said of her initial attempts to secure funding. "I thought: 'Of course they're going to make my film. It's brilliant!'"

The Whistleblower was described as a "fictionalized dramatic presentation" of a late-1990s scandal. The producers based it on Bolkovac's experiences, rather than on her memoir. Vanessa Redgrave played Madeleine Rees, a UN human-rights official ("one of the film's few heroic characters") who helps Bolkovac uncover the sex trade. Raya (Roxana Condurache) and Luba (Paula Schramm), two Ukrainian young women who are trafficked into Bosnia, are the primary representations of the trafficking victims encountered by Bolkovac. Neither is based on a particular person; they are composites of young women forced to work in Bosnian brothels. Kondracki's younger sister, Rayisa, also played a trafficking victim. For legal reasons the pseudonym "Democra Security" was used for DynCorp International, the organization whose employees reportedly sexually enslaved the women.

Although the producers kept the film factual, they debated how much to include. Details on the bureaucracy were removed. Kondracki said, "It was too much information and, frankly, people were bored." Another concern was how much violence against the sex-trafficking victims should be depicted in the film. Kondracki chose to bluntly portray the inhumane treatment of the young women, which she described as accurate representations of what happened. This included a graphic scene in which Raya is raped with a metal pipe after her escape and recapture. Weisz thought the reality had been toned down, "In real life there were girls doing this as young as 8 years old." Kondracki agreed, saying that she had lightened the events depicted out of fear that viewers would "tune it out":

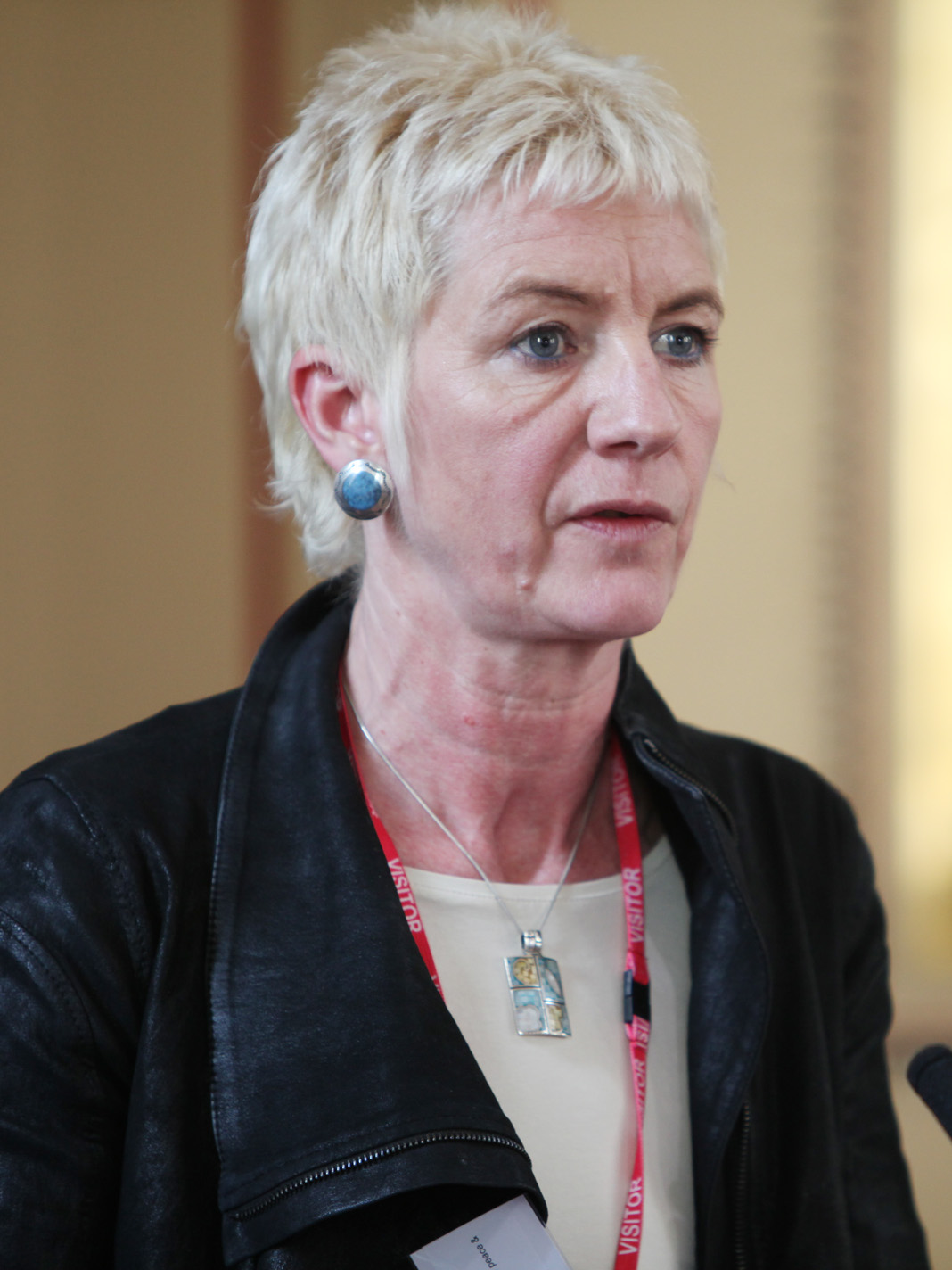
Madeleine Rees (pictured) and Kathryn Bolkovac testified that DynCorp (Democra Security in the film) employees had participated in the sex trafficking of women in Bosnia.

We show what is just about permissible to show. We couldn't possibly include the three-week desensitisation period, when they burn the girls in particular places. We couldn't really capture the hopelessness of life these women are subjected to.

Kondracki said that her goal for The Whistleblower was "information and exposure" on human trafficking. She said, "No one is putting pressure on governments to stop it, and there is no accountability. It's laziness."

=== Filming ===
The Whistleblower is a Canadian–German co-production. Weisz received the script from producer Amy Kaufman in 2007. Since she was pregnant with her son at the time, she initially turned down the offer. She said the story haunted her, and she later contacted Kaufman to ask if the project was still available. She signed on in August 2009, and shooting began in October 2009.

Bolkovac visited the set in Bucharest, Romania, where most of the movie was filmed. Weisz said that she made a point to spend "every waking moment" with her to accurately portray her. Weisz and Bolkovac are dissimilar in appearance: the former is dark-haired and slight, and the latter is "blond and much more voluptuous" and "much taller". As a result, the actress focused on emulating Bolkovac's accent and determination. Bolkovac later said she commended the choice to portray her and appreciated Weisz's efforts to be accurate.

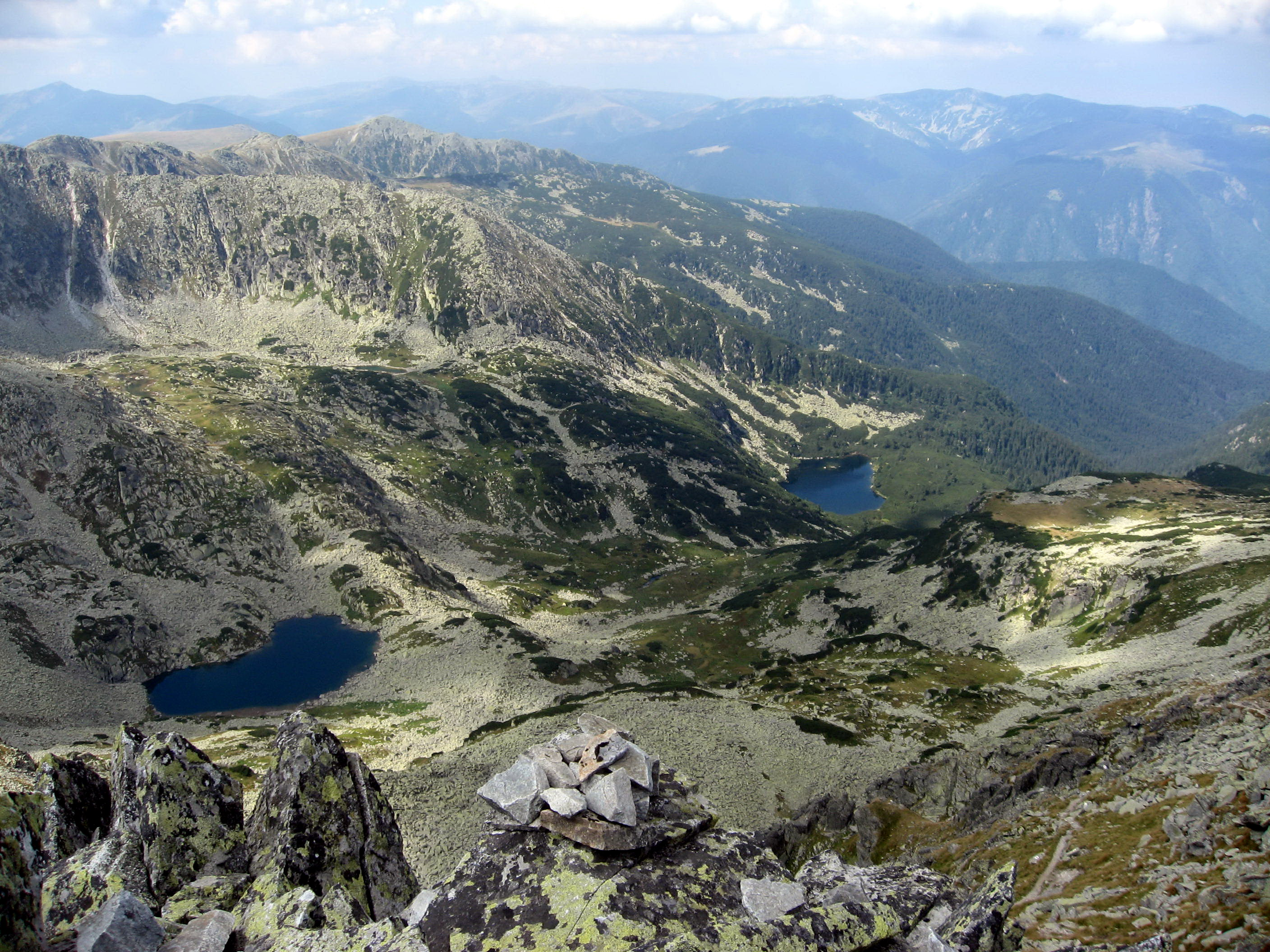
The Carpathian Mountains in Romania were used to depict much of the Bosnian landscape.

Filming took around six weeks, relatively short for a thriller; Weisz said most take about three months to complete. Producers used hand-held cameras and had a lower budget than usual for the genre. Location filming took place in Eastern Europe, predominantly Romania. Scenes set in UN buildings were filmed in Toronto. Most outdoor scenes are set at night; daytime shots often appear bleak, gray and overcast. This, coupled with a grainy texture, helped create a documentary feel.

She was so interested in who I was as a person. Not, obviously, to look like me or to behave like me, but to make sure that my character came out and to make sure that she was saying and doing things perhaps the way that I would've wanted them done. And I know that there had to be a lot of liberties taken to make the movie. But I think in general she does do a great job of bringing my character to the film.

— Kathryn Bolkovac on Weisz's portrayal

Weisz had to separate herself emotionally from the atrocities depicted in the film. "It's something you learn," she said. "It's true between 'action' and 'cut,' and after 'cut' it's just not true anymore." Bolkovac echoed Weisz's sentiments, adding that distancing oneself emotionally is a necessity when working on a police force. However, the producers wanted the audience to be affected by scenes depicting brutal treatment of the women forced into prostitution, and the character of Raya was created to give a human face to the victims. Much of the rape scene was cut after its brutality caused a viewer to faint during the film's first screening in Toronto. Weisz responded:

I completely understand. It would be just too harrowing for people to watch. What actually happened was so much worse. I mean the stories I could tell you from the first person who encountered these young women. That was the "light" version if you can believe that. But it isn't a documentary, you don't want to destroy people. You just want to illuminate something that actually happened that was a hundred times worse.

== Themes ==
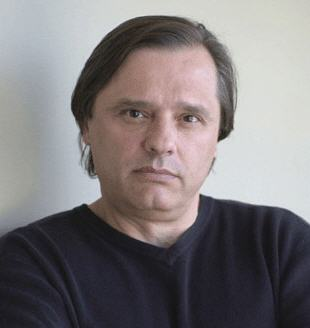
Victor Malarek's book The Natashas inspired Kondracki to produce a film on sex trafficking

The Whistleblower focuses on sexual slavery, human trafficking, and corruption. Kondracki wanted her first project to concern sex trafficking but was unsure how to create a moving, original plot. Her mother was born in Ukraine, and she was aware of what she described as the country's "epidemic" of trafficking. Victor Malarek's book The Natashas inspired her to produce a film on the subject. She said of her initiative being a challenge, "No one wants to watch a film of an enslaved girl being raped for two hours." Bolkovac's experiences gave Kondracki a framework for the film and added the themes of corruption and wide-scale cover-ups. Film critic Rex Reed said that the abuse of power featured prominently in The Whistleblower; a number of government officials participate in the sex trade or turn a blind eye to it (including peacekeepers, UN members and mercenaries). Wallace Baine of the Santa Cruz Sentinel wrote that these aspects' portrayal made the movie "slippery and true-to-life". She said, "There are clear and vivid monsters in this film, but there are also those existing in the shades-of-gray middle, nice-enough guys tolerating crimes of unspeakable barbarity." Justice, another prominent theme, does not materialize by the end. The sex trafficking victim Raya is killed, and none of the peacekeepers who participated in the trafficking are prosecuted (although several are sent home). According to Baine, viewers are left with the impression that "the worst violence in Bolkovac's story was the violence done to justice".

Bolkovac is portrayed as imperfect—a "noble but screwed up" individual. In the film (which roughly mirrors her real life), her personal life is in disarray. She has lost custody of her children to her ex-husband and goes to Bosnia to earn money to move closer to them. While there, she has an affair with a fellow peacekeeper. Kondracki wanted to promote the idea of an average protagonist who acted against injustice while her peers looked the other way. Her flaws are offset by her determination to fight the sex trade, and reviewers found these aspects instrumental in making her a three-dimensional character.

Weisz compared Bolkovac's story of "one lone woman fighting injustice" to that of David and Goliath, her favorite film genre. In the film, as in real life, Bolkovac begins by investigating a case of a kidnapped girl. As the story unfolds, she discovers a wide-ranging web of corruption and faces growing obstacles. The sex trade is facilitated by a large, influential organization. When she tries to report her findings to the UN and local officials, she receives threats and is "shunned by coworkers and thwarted by higher-ups". Weisz explained that she liked the idea of an ordinary person doing something extraordinary. She said, "I love that kind of thriller, the ordinary person who, because of their character, it's their character that leads them."

== Release ==
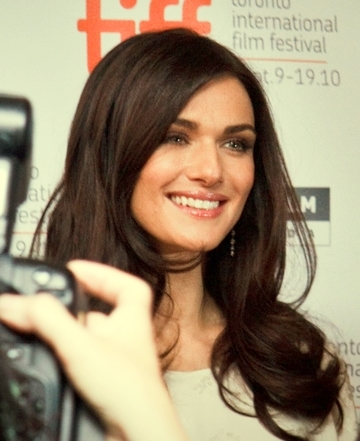
Rachel Weisz at the film's 2010 Toronto Film Festival premiere

The Whistleblower premiered on 13 September 2010, at the 2010 Toronto Film Festival. Screenings were also held at film festivals in North America, including the 2011 Human Rights Watch Film Festival in New York.

A screening was held for The Whistleblower in Bosnia-Herzegovina for the first time in March 2014. The film was shown in Sarajevo and Mostar, with Kathryn Bolkovac being invited to speak to the Bosnian audience.

=== Box office ===
Samuel Goldwyn Films purchased rights to distribute the film in the United States. The film had a limited release starting on 5 August 2011. It initially screened in seven theaters and expanded to a maximum of 70 theaters before drawing down. Its theatrical run lasted 12 weeks, during which it grossed $1.1 million.

=== Critical response ===
At the time of its theatrical release, The Whistleblower received mixed reviews. On review aggregator Rotten Tomatoes, the film holds an approval rating of 75% based on 120 reviews, with an average rating of 6.5/10; the website's critics consensus reads: "Rachel Weisz puts on a compelling smoldering act though the film suffers from a literal-minded approach to the material." Another aggregator, Metacritic, surveyed 31 critics and assessed 17 reviews as positive, 10 as mixed, and four as negative. Based on the reviews, it gave the film a score of 59 out of 100, which it said indicated "mixed or average reviews".

The Guardian's Ed Vulliamy called The Whistleblower "the most searing drama-documentary of recent years", and The Huffington Post's Marshall Fine said the story was "dark, grim, and harrowing". Doris Toumarkine of Film Journal International called the movie a "well-told but troubling story impressively wrapped for audiences who show up in theatres for do-good cinema of a high order". Leigh Paatsch of News.com.au said, "it is Bolkovac's ferocious will to right so many wrongs (expertly channelled by Weisz) that keeps you glued to the screen". Stephenie Foster of The Huffington Post gave the film a highly-favorable review:

It's a compelling and maddening story, and reflects the complexity of how international institutions function and interact and the difficulty of accountability in a situation where people have immunity for their actions. But, it's also a story of gutsy people in tough and compromising situations making decisions that aren't in their personal best interest.

An equally positive review appeared in The Balkan Chronicle:

Kondracki shows great promise with her direction. Pacing is tight for the most part, and the film feels well polished...The film is unsatisfying only in its conclusion. This is not the fault of the filmmakers who choose to stay true to Bolkovac's story. No one was ever brought to justice. A few of men were fired and sent home, but everyone had diplomatic immunity so no one ever faced criminal charges. Two million people worldwide are still being trafficked.

Allison Willmore of The A.V. Club gave The Whistleblower a negative review, criticizing the producers for making its antagonists one-dimensional: "There's no hint of the erosion of morality that led to this point." Peter Rainer of The Christian Science Monitor called the film's pace "frustratingly uneven", but commended the actors' performances: Condurache "makes Raya's fears tremblingly palpable". Stephen Holden of The New York Times wrote that the film "tells a story so repellent that it is almost beyond belief. Its conclusion—that in the moral quagmire of war and its aftermath, human trafficking and corruption are collateral damage—is unutterably depressing." He praised Weisz's performance as "the strongest element" of the production.

The actors' performances received overall praise from reviewers. Camerin Courtney of Christianity Today was dismayed that the main character engaged in a sexual relationship with a married man, but Weisz "is wonderful as Bolkovac, a no-nonsense civil servant who is stunned at what she walks into" while "Vanessa Redgrave is a needed touch of strength and warmth as her mentor Madeleine, and David Strathairn is at his government thriller best as Peter Ward, an Internal Affairs agent. Raya is heart-breaking as the young victim." Steve Rea of The Post and Courier praised Redgrave's acting in the supporting role of Madeleine Rees as "forceful, elegant, precise". Mick LaSalle of the San Francisco Chronicle said, "Weisz gives a psychologically astute performance as a woman who can't leave things alone." Rex Reed of Observer called her "superb" in the lead role.

Kondracki's graphic depiction of violence was controversial. Bob Mondello of NPR called it "sobering", but felt the scenes detracted from the film and should have been more subtle. Ryan Rojas of Tonight at the Movies described the film as "gritty and merciless", and cautioned that certain scenes might offend some viewers: "While the scenes do work as reinforcing the horror of the events, it really just made it obvious that the way that the director was going to win over fans was to simply shock them into numbness, as scenes showing rape, mutilation, and murder are shown in very disturbing fashion." Christian Hamaker of Crosswalk.com wrote:

The film is almost unremittingly grim, which may seem appropriate for such a horrifying subject, but the effect on the viewer is that of being struck repeatedly with a sledgehammer. Sex trafficking is bad. Really bad! Did you get that, or do you need to watch a few more scenes of physical and sexual brutality? Don't worry: The Whistleblower has those aplenty. It takes brutality into the realm of gratuitousness, all in the name of showing the horrors of the issue it's addressing.

A review in The Balkan Chronicle, an Internet-based newspaper reporting from the Balkans, disagreed with the opinion that the violence was unnecessarily explicit or sensationalized: "Sugarcoating it would do no one any good. Grisly authenticity is one of the film's greatest aspects." Later, when Bolkovac spoke at a screening of the film in Bosnia, it was reported that her message was well-received and discussion about the events that occurred in the late 1990s "did not fail to engage and provoke".

=== Home media ===
20th Century Fox Home Entertainment released the film on DVD on 15 January 2012. The movie was reportedly more successful on Blu-ray Disc than in theatres, and film critic Lynette Porter said that the subject's serious nature made it better suited for television.

=== Accolades ===
| Year | Award | Category | Recipients and nominees | Result | Ref. |
|---|---|---|---|---|---|
| 2010 | Whistler Film Festival | Audience Award – Best Narrative Feature | The Whistleblower | Won | |
| 2010 | Whistler Film Festival | Phillip Borsos Award – Best Film | The Whistleblower | Won | |
| 2011 | Palm Springs International Film Festival | Audience Award – Best Narrative Feature | The Whistleblower | Won | |
| 2011 | Cinema for Peace Awards | Cinema for Peace Award – Justice & Human Rights | Larysa Kondracki | Nominated | |
| 2011 | Seattle International Film Festival | Golden Space Needle Award – Best Director | Larysa Kondracki | Won | |
| 2011 | Seattle International Film Festival | Golden Space Needle Award – Best Film | The Whistleblower | Nominated | |
| 2012 | Genie Awards | Best Motion Picture | The Whistleblower | Nominated | |
| 2012 | Genie Awards | Best Actress | Rachel Weisz | Nominated | |
| 2012 | Genie Awards | Best Supporting Actress | Roxana Condurache | Nominated | |
| 2012 | Vancouver Film Critics Circle | Vancouver Film Critics Circle Award for Best Actress in a Canadian Film | Rachel Weisz | Nominated | |

== Aftermath ==
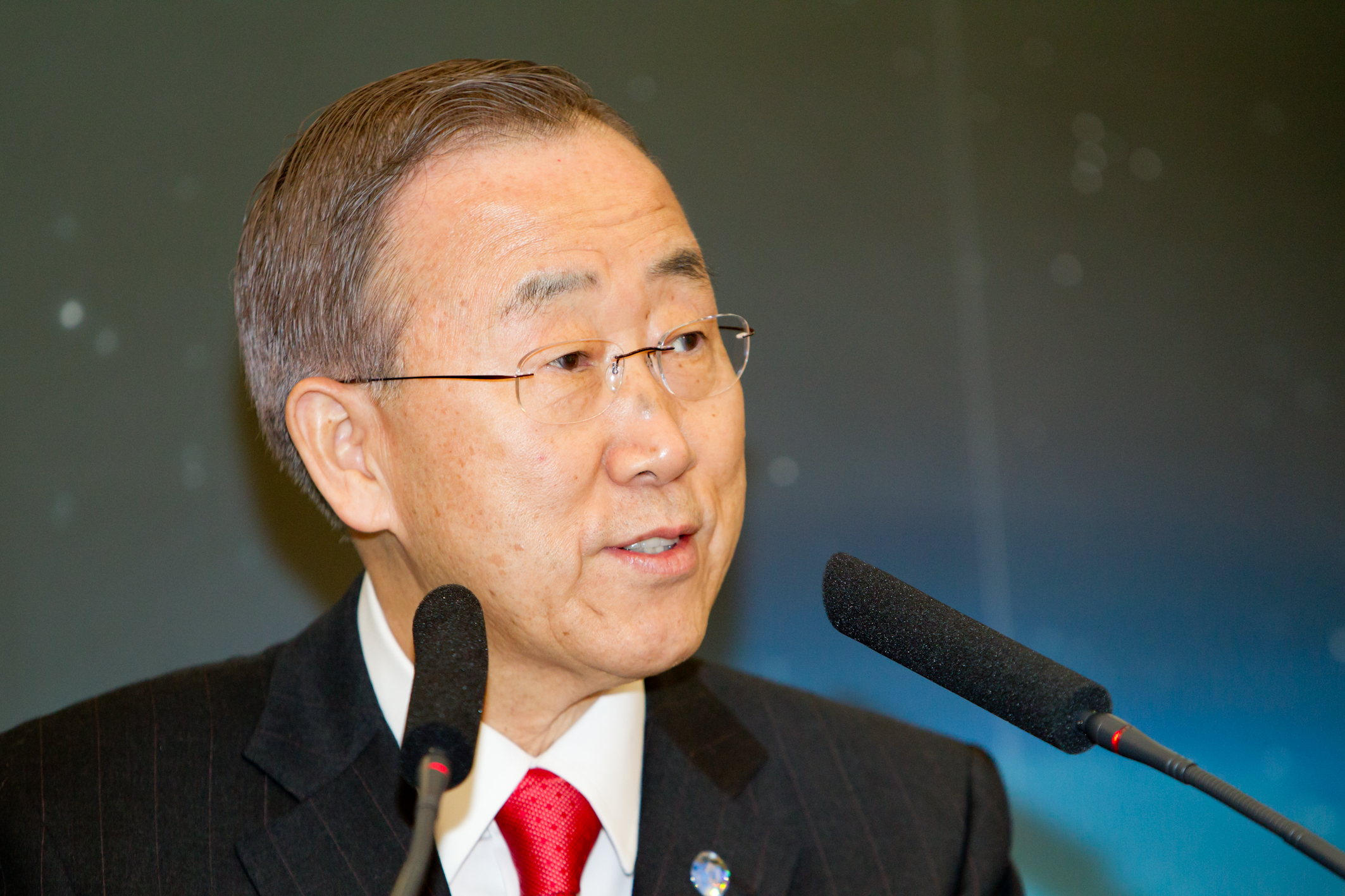
In response to controversy caused by the film, UN Secretary-General Ban Ki-moon promised action to prevent sex trafficking by UN workers.

Consistent with Bolkovac's account, The Whistleblower portrays DynCorp International employees as participants in the postwar Bosnian sex trade with the UN turning a blind eye. UN Secretary-General Ban Ki-moon hosted a screening of the film and promised action would be taken to prevent further instances of human trafficking. Bolkovac responded, "Unfortunately, the widespread horror is already there. This is not going to be simple or a quick fix." Kondracki added that while she wanted to be optimistic and hoped that the screening would "lead to genuine discussion and thought about the UN's involvement in sex trafficking and other crimes", she worried that it might not have the desired lasting impact: "I know we are going to hear a lot about what has been done since the time depicted in this film, but rhetoric only goes so far. The situation has escalated." Following the theatrical release of The Whistleblower, The Guardian reported that other UN officials attempted to downplay the events depicted and that initiatives against trafficking in Bosnia were aborted.

DynCorp International spokesperson Ashley Burke said:

I haven't seen the movie so I can't comment on its content, but I can tell you that, when we contacted the film's distributor to learn more about the movie, we were informed that the film 'is a fictionalized dramatic presentation' that while inspired by Ms. Bolkovac's experiences, is not based on her book. There was no threatened legal action taken to ensure they did not use the company's name in the film.
