= List of Canadian films of 2009 =

This is a list of Canadian films which were released in 2009:

Title	Director	Cast	Genre	Notes
1981	Ricardo Trogi	Jean-Carl Boucher, Claudio Colangelo, Sandrine Bisson	Drama	Prix Jutra – Supporting Actress (Bisson)
3 Seasons (3 saisons)	Jim Donovan		Drama	
5150 Elm's Way (5150, rue des Ormes)	Éric Tessier	René-Daniel Dubois, Marc-André Grondin	Drama, Thriller	Based on the novel 5150, rue des Ormes
Act of God	Jennifer Baichwal	Paul Auster, Dannion Brinkley	Documentary	Vancouver International Film Festival premiere
Amreeka	Cherien Dabis	Nisreen Faour, Melkar Muallem, Hiam Abbass, Alia Shawkat	Immigrant family drama	Cannes Film Festival – International Critics Prize; Canada-Kuwait co-production
The Armoire	Jamie Travis	William Cuddy, Ricardo Hoyos, Penelope Corrin	Short drama	
At Home by Myself...With You	Kris Booth	Kristin Booth, Aaron Abrams, Shauna MacDonald	Comedy drama	
Blind Spot (Lucidité passagère)	Fabrice Barrilliet, Nicolas Bolduc, Julien Knafo, Marie-Hélène Panisset	Daniel Parent, Hélène Florent, Erik Duhamel, Maxim Roy, Mario Saint-Amand	Drama	
Broke	Rosvita Dransfeld	David Woolfson, Chris Hoard	Documentary	
Cadavres	Érik Canuel	Patrick Huard, Julie Le Breton, Sylvie Boucher, Christopher Heyerdahl	Black comedy	Prix Jutra – Makeup
Cairo Time	Ruba Nadda	Patricia Clarkson, Alexander Siddig, Elena Anaya, Amina Annabi, Tom McCamus	Romance	TIFF – Best Canadian Feature; Canada-Ireland-Egypt co-production
The Canadiens, Forever (Pour toujours, les Canadiens!)	Sylvain Archambault	Dhanaé Audet-Beaulieu, Antoine L'Écuyer, Céline Bonnier, Christian Bégin	Drama	
Carcasses	Denis Côté	Jean-Paul Colmor	Docufiction	
A Cargo to Africa (Un cargo pour l'Afrique)	Roger Cantin		Drama	
The Cave (?E?anx)	Helen Haig-Brown	Edmund Lulua, Kelly William	Short science fiction	
Chloe	Atom Egoyan	Liam Neeson, Julianne Moore, Amanda Seyfried, Max Thieriot	Sexual drama	A Canada-France co-production made with U.S. financing; screenplay by Erin Cressida Wilson (based on the screenplay of the 2003 film Nathalie by Anne Fontaine).
Clouds Over the City (Nuages sur la ville)	Simon Galiero		Drama	
Cole	Carl Bessai	Richard de Klerk, Kandyse McClure, Rebecca Jenkins, Sonja Bennett	Drama	
Cooking with Stella	Richie Mehta	Don McKellar, Lisa Ray, Seema Biswas, Vanesh Bhardwaj, Shriya Saran	Drama	Canada-India co-production
Defendor	Peter Stebbings	Woody Harrelson, Elias Koteas, Kat Dennings, Sandra Oh, Clark Johnson, Lisa Ray	Drama	Genie Award – Honourable Mention
The Delian Mode	Kara Blake	Delia Derbyshire	Documentary	
Detour (Détour)	Sylvain Guy	Luc Picard, Isabelle Guérard, Guillaume Lemay-Thivierge	Thriller	
District 9	Neill Blomkamp	Sharlto Copley, Jason Cope, David James, Vanessa Haywood, Mandla Gaduka, Kenneth Nkosi, Eugene Khumbanyiwa, Louis Minnaar, William Allen Young	Science fiction action	
Excited	Bruce Sweeney	Gabrielle Rose, Agam Darshi	Comedy	
Father and Guns (De père en flic)	Émile Gaudreault	Michel Côté, Louis-José Houde, Caroline Dhavernas, Rémy Girard	Comedy	Golden Reel Award
Fig Trees	John Greyson		Documentary on AIDS in Africa	Berlin Film Festival- Teddy Award
Finding Farley	Leanne Allison		Documentary	Cross-Canada trek to meet Farley Mowat
Five Hole: Tales of Hockey Erotica	Cam Christiansen		Animated short	
Free Fall (Les pieds dans le vide)	Mariloup Wolfe	Guillaume Lemay-Thivierge, Laurence Leboeuf, Éric Bruneau	Drama	
Genius Within: The Inner Life of Glenn Gould	Peter Raymont, Michèle Hozer		Documentary	
A Happy Man (Le Bonheur de Pierre)	Robert Ménard	Pierre Richard, Rémy Girard	Comedy-drama	
A Hard Name	Alan Zweig		Documentary	Best feature-length documentary, Genie Awards
Heat Wave (Les grandes chaleurs)	Sophie Lorain	Marie-Thérèse Fortin, François Arnaud, Marie Brassard	Drama	
How to Be Alone	Andrea Dorfman	Tanya Davis	Animated short	
Hugh Hefner: Playboy, Activist and Rebel	Brigitte Berman	Hugh Hefner	Documentary	
I Killed My Mother (J'ai tué ma mère)	Xavier Dolan	Xavier Dolan, Anne Dorval, François Arnaud, Suzanne Clément	Drama	Xavier Dolan's first feature
The Imaginarium of Doctor Parnassus	Terry Gilliam	Christopher Plummer, Tom Waits, Lily Cole, Heath Ledger, Jude Law, Colin Farrell, Johnny Depp	Fantasy drama	Academy Award nominations for costumes and art direction; Canada-U.K.-France co-production
Inside Hana's Suitcase	Larry Weinstein		Documentary	
Invisible City	Hubert Davis		Documentary	Best Canadian Feature, Hot Docs
Jajo's Secret	James Motluk		Documentary	
Kissed by Lightning	Shelley Niro		Drama	
Ladies in Blue (Les dames en bleu)	Claude Demers		Documentary	
Land of Men (Terre des hommes)	Ky Nam Le Duc	Jorge Martinez Colorado, Rosa Zacharie, Hugues Saint-Louis	Short drama	
Last Train Home	Lixin Fan		Documentary	Genie Award – Documentary; Prix Jutra – Documentary
Leslie, My Name Is Evil	Reginald Harkema	Kristen Hager, Gregory Smith, Ryan Robbins, Tracy Wright, Don McKellar	drama	
Life Begins (La Vie commence)	Émile Proulx-Cloutier	Jacques Girard, Maxime Dumontier, Vincent Proulx-Hébert, Anfée Tremblay-Proulx	Short drama	
The Little White Cloud That Cried	Guy Maddin	Breanna Rose Taylor, Marcia Ferreira, Eric Wood, Lexi Tronic, Teresa Braun, Zsa Zsa LaBitche, Sex Party Marty	Experimental short	
Lost Song	Rodrigue Jean	Suzie LeBlanc	Drama	TIFF – Best Canadian Feature
Love and Savagery	John N. Smith	Allan Hawco, Sarah Greene, Martha Burns	Romantic drama	Genie Award – Supporting Actress (Burns); screenplay by Des Walsh; Canada-Ireland co-production
Mark	Mike Hoolboom	Mark Karbusicky, Mirha-Soleil Ross, Kristyn Dunnion	Documentary	
The Master Key (Grande Ourse: La Clé des possibles)	Patrice Sauvé	Marc Messier, Normand Daneau, Fanny Mallette	Science fiction/fantasy	
New Denmark	Rafaël Ouellet		Drama	
Night Mayor	Guy Maddin	Nihad Ademi	Short	Best Experimental Short, South by Southwest
Mr. Nobody	Jaco Van Dormael	Sarah Polley, Jared Leto, Diane Kruger, Rhys Ifans	Science fiction film	Belgium-Canada-France-Germany co-production; most expensive Belgian film to date
One Night	Shelagh Carter	Jonathan Ralston, Jennifer Dale	Short	
Out in That Deep Blue Sea	Kazik Radwanski		Short drama	
Passenger Side	Matt Bissonnette	Adam Scott, Joel Bissonnette, Gale Harold	Drama	
Petropolis: Aerial Perspectives on the Alberta Tar Sands	Peter Mettler		Documentary	
Polytechnique	Denis Villeneuve	Maxim Gaudette, Sebastien Huberdeau, Karine Vanasse	Drama	Based on a true story on the École Polytechnique massacre
Prom Night in Mississippi	Paul Saltzman		Documentary	
Reel Injun	Neil Diamond	Adam Beach, Sacheen Littlefeather, Russell Means	Documentary	History of American Indians in cinema; Peabody Award winner
Robes of War (Robe de guerre)	Michèle Cournoyer		National Film Board animated short	Prix Jutra – Animated Short
Runaway	Cordell Barker		National Film Board animated short	Genie Award – Animated Short
Savage	Lisa Jackson		Short film	Genie Award – Live action short drama
Snow Hides the Shade of Fig Trees (La neige cache l'ombre des figuiers)	Samer Najari		Short film	
The Spine	Chris Landreth	Gordon Pinsent, Alberta Watson (voices)	Computer animation	Follow-up to Landreth's Oscar-winning Ryan
Survival of the Dead	George A. Romero	Alan Van Sprang, Kenneth Welsh, Devon Bostick, Richard Fitzpatrick	Zombie horror	Made with U.S. financing
Suzie	Micheline Lanctôt	Micheline Lanctôt, Pascale Bussières, Normand Daneau	Drama	
Taking the Plunge 2 (À vos marques... party! 2)	Frédéric D'Amours		Comedy	
Through the Mist (Dédé, à travers les brumes)	Jean-Philippe Duval	Sébastien Ricard, Joseph Mesiano, Dimitri Storoge, Benedicte Decary	Biodrama	About the life of Dédé Fortin, the front man for the band Les Colocs; Prix Jutra – Actor (Ricard), Art Direction, Costumes, Musical Score
The Timekeeper (L'Heure de vérité)	Louis Bélanger	Craig Olejnik, Roy Dupuis, Stephen McHattie, Gary Farmer	Drama	
Trailer Park Boys: Countdown to Liquor Day	Mike Clattenburg	Robb Wells, John Paul Tremblay, Mike Smith	Comedy	
Train to Nowhere (À quelle heure le train pour nulle part)	Robin Aubert			
The Trotsky	Jacob Tierney	Jay Baruchel, Emily Hampshire		Genie Awards – Screenplay, Song
The Uninvited	The Guard Brothers	Elizabeth Banks, Emily Browning, Arielle Kebbel, David Strathairn	Psychological horror	
Vital Signs (Les Signes vitaux)	Sophie Deraspe		Drama	
A Wake	Penelope Buitenhuis	Tara Nicodemo, Graham Abbey, Krista Sutton, Raoul Bhaneja, Martha Burns, Kristopher Turner, Nicholas Campbell	Drama	
Walled In	Gilles Paquet-Brenner	Mischa Barton, Cameron Bright, Deborah Kara Unger	Horror, Thriller	Canada-France co-production made with U.S. financing
Waterlife	Kevin McMahon	narrated by Gordon Downie	Documentary produced with the National Film Board	
The Wild Hunt	Alexandre Franchi	Mark Krupa, Ricky Mabe, Kaniehtiio Horn	Drama	TIFF – Best Canadian First Feature; Sundance Film Festival – Audience Award
You Might As Well Live	Simon Ennis	Joshua Peace, Michael Madsen, Stephen McHattie	Comedy	

== See also ==
- 2009 in Canada
- 2009 in Canadian television
