= Patuelli =

Patuelli is a surname. Notable people with the surname include:

- Alessia Patuelli (born 2002), Italian racing cyclist
- Luca Patuelli (born 1984), Canadian b-boy
