= A Wake =

A Wake may refer to:

- A Wake (film), a 2009 drama film directed by Penelope Buitenhuis
- "A Wake", a song by Macklemore from the album The Heist
