= Mario Saint-Amand =

Canadian actor (born 1968)

- Born: January 23, 1968 (age 58); Sept-îles, Quebec, Canada
- Occupation: Actor
- Years active: 1987–present

Mario Saint-Amand (born January 23, 1968) is a Canadian actor from Quebec.

== Biography ==
Mario Saint-Amand began his career in 1987 at the Denise-Pelletier Theater in Le Mariage de Figaro (The Marriage of Figaro) alongside Guy Nadon. Saint-Amand made the transition from opera to theatre by taking the role of Harlequin in Marivaux's play Le Jeu de l'Amour et du Hasard (The Game of Love and chance). Throughout the early 1990s, he appeared in a plays directed by André Brassard, Dominique Champagne, and André Montmorency.

Saint-Amand began his film career in the late 1980s. His first starring role was in the 1991 movie Love Me (Love-Moi) directed by Marcel Simard. He starred in several TV series including Scoop, Networks and more recently, in Grande Ourse, directed by Patrice Sauvé.

At the 1994 Gémeaux Awards, Saint-Amand won the "Best Performance by an Actor in a Featured Supporting Role" award for his notable portrayal of a man with AIDS in a guest appearance on the TV series L'Amour avec un grand A (Love with a Capital L).

In 2004, he founded a company named Les Films de la Dune (The Movies of the Dune) with the aim of producing his own projects. He also founded the Ciné Cabarouette to introduce elementary school students to the art of film making. He continued to appear in movies throughout the 2000s, notably as Gérald "Gerry" Boulet in Gerry, a biopic about the lead singer of the French Canadian blues band Offenbach.

Saint-Amand began working as a screenwriter with the encouragement of André Forcier. He started with the movie Coteau rouge, in which he also played the character Henri Blanchard. Afterwards, he played forL'enfer, c'est moi (Hell, it's me), the biographical story of Actress Néfertarie Bélizaire's childhood sexual abuse at the hands of her uncle in Haiti. He also played in "Pas de Mal À Une Mouche" (No Harm to a Fly) inspired by the Maryse Latandresse novel of the same name.

In 2012, he started his own band "Le Saint-Amand Blues" and released five mini-albums. He produced two more albums in 2013 and 2014. In these albums, he paid homage to the songwriters of Offenbach and Gerry Boulet. These albums included 11 songs and 11 short stories that are part of the show he gave throughout Quebec during spring of 2013.

In 2019, Mario Saint-Amand was a student at Laval University and an assistant researcher at the Quebec Addiction Rehabilitation Center and has been a spokesperson for Maisons Péladeau since 2014.

== Filmography ==
- 1988: animateur Émission AZ, au Canal Famille, dans le rôle d'Antoine Zénon.
- 1990: Watatatow : Simon Laurin
- 1991: Love Me (Love-Moi) : Jacques
- 1992: L'Automne sauvage : Antoine
- 1995: Radio Enfer : Guylain Ti-Guy Tremblay
- 1995: Scoop: Robert Johnson
- 1995: Les grands procès (Affaire Cordélia Viau) : Sam Parslow
- 1996: Karmina : Pierre Boutin
- 1998: La Part des anges : Philippe Bernard
- 1998: Escape : Prisoner
- 1998: Réseaux: Michel Valois
- 1999: Opération Tango : Sergent Davila
- 2000: Family Pack (Que faisaient les femmes pendant que l'homme marchait sur la Lune ?) : Bob
- 2003: Grande Ourse : Pierre Lamy
- 2005: L'Héritière de Grande Ourse: Pierre Lamy
- 2005: Emilio : The Cat & Emilio grown-up
- 2007: Le Symptôme : Capitaine Colorado
- 2007: Truffles (Truffe) : Mineur
- 2008: Blind Spot (Lucidité passagère) : Mathieu
- 2009: Je me souviens: Rock
- 2010: Coteau rouge : Henri
- 2011: Gerry : Gerry Boulet
- 2016: District 31: Michel David
- 2023: Katak: The Brave Beluga (Katak, le brave béluga)

== Awards and nominations ==
=== Awards ===
He won a Gemini Award in 1994 in the category "Best Performance in a Supporting Role" in all dramatic categories for his character Jean Pierre in "Missionary AIDS" written and directed by Janette Bertrand.

=== Nominations ===
His first nomination took place at the presentation of Prix Gémeaux in 1992 following the interpretation of his character, Alain, suffering from schizophrenia in L’amour c’est pas assez (Love is not enough). It was still under the direction of Janette Bertrand at the time, which is when he won the award for "Best Male Performance in a Supporting Role" for his memorable composition of the character of Jean-Pierre suffering from AIDS in the Dramatic "Missionary AIDS". In 1994, his character Simon Laurin in the popular series Watatatow lead him to a third nomination in the category Best performance drama show or drama series. While still under the direction of Janette Bertrand, he gets re-nominated again in 1996 when he gets offered the role of Louis Côté in Un Peu, Beaucoup, À la Folie (A Little, Much, To the Folly) that he will play alongside Marcel Leboeuf and Macha Limonchik.

First nominated for the 2012 Prix Jutra for Henri's character from André Forcier's film Coteau rouge and his interpretation of the legendary singer of the band Offenbach, Gérald Gerry Boulet, in the movie Gerry.
