= Duncan McKenzie (disambiguation) =

Duncan McKenzie (born 1950) is an English footballer.

Duncan McKenzie may also refer to:

- Duncan McKenzie (footballer, born 1912) (1912–1987), Scottish international footballer (Albion Rovers, Brentford and Middlesbrough)
- Duncan McKenzie (murderer) (1951–1995), American murderer executed by lethal injection in Montana
- Duncan McKenzie (writer) (born 1960), English-born Canadian television writer

== See also ==
- Duncan Mackenzie (1861–1934), Scottish archaeologist
