= Life with My Father =

- French: La Vie avec mon père
- Directed by: Sébastien Rose
- Written by: Sébastien Rose; Stéfanie Lasnier
- Produced by: Roger Frappier; Luc Vandal
- Starring: Raymond Bouchard; Paul Ahmarani; David La Haye
- Cinematography: Nicolas Bolduc
- Edited by: Dominique Fortin
- Music by: Nathalie Boileau; Pierre Desrochers
- Production company: Max Films Productions
- Distributed by: Christal Films
- Release date: March 25, 2005
- Running time: 105 minutes
- Country: Canada
- Language: French

Life with My Father (French: La Vie avec mon père) is a Canadian drama film, directed by Sébastien Rose and released in 2005. The film stars Raymond Bouchard as François Agira, a successful novelist returning home to Quebec after spending several years living in France to announce that he is terminally ill, forcing his estranged sons Paul (Paul Ahmarani) and Patrick (David La Haye) to make peace with him and each other.

The cast also includes Hélène Florent, Julie du Page, Pierre-Antoine Lasnier, Nicolas Canuel, Benoît McGinnis and Christine Beaulieu.

The film premiered theatrically in March 2005.

The film won the Audience Award at the Karlovy Vary International Film Festival.
