= Gerry (2011 film) =

- Directed by: Alain DesRochers
- Screenplay by: Nathalie Petrowski
- Produced by: Christian Larouche
- Starring: Mario Saint-Amand
- Cinematography: Yves Bélanger
- Music by: FM Le Sieur
- Release date: 15 June 2011
- Country: Canada
- Language: French
- Budget: $6 million

Gerry is a 2011 biographical film shot in Quebec about rock singer Gerry Boulet (1946-1990) from Saint-Jean-sur-Richelieu, Quebec written by Nathalie Petrowski and directed by Alain DesRochers. The lead role of Boulet was played by Mario Saint-Amand and Jassen Charron played Gerry Boulet in his early days.

Gerry was filmed in Montréal and other places in Québec starting 19 April 2010. The live concert scene where Boulet and his band Offenbach perform in Montreal Forum required the presence of 3000 spectators.

The film was premiered in Boulet's home town Saint-Jean-sur-Richelieu on 30 May 2011 and launched on Quebec movie theatres on 15 June 2011.

== Synopsis ==
Gérald Boulet was in music from an early age. In the end of the 1960s, he founded the rock band Offenbach with his brother Denis. The group saw great success and peaked in the 1970s with the joining of Pierre Harel. After many years, Offenbach disbanded and Boulet started a solo career with great success in Québec. After many years of drug and alcohol abuse, he was diagnosed with colon cancer and died in 1990, at the age of 44.

== Cast ==
- Mario Saint-Amand as Gerry Boulet
- Jassen Charron as Gerry Boulet at 13 years old
- Capucine Delaby as Françoise Faraldo
- Marc-François Blondin as Johnny Gravel
- Éric Bruneau as Pierre Harel
- Jonas Tomalty as John McGale
- Louis-David Morasse as Denis Boulet
- Eugene Brotto as Breen Leboeuf
- Mathieu Lepage as Willie Lamothe
- Madeleine Péloquin as Denise Boulet
- Roberto Mei as Wezo
- Stéphane Archambault as Alain Simard
- Nathalie Cavezzali as director
- Hugo Dubé as Doctor Jolivet
- Normand Daneau as Béranger Dufour
