= Nathalie Petrowski =

Canadian journalist (born 1954)

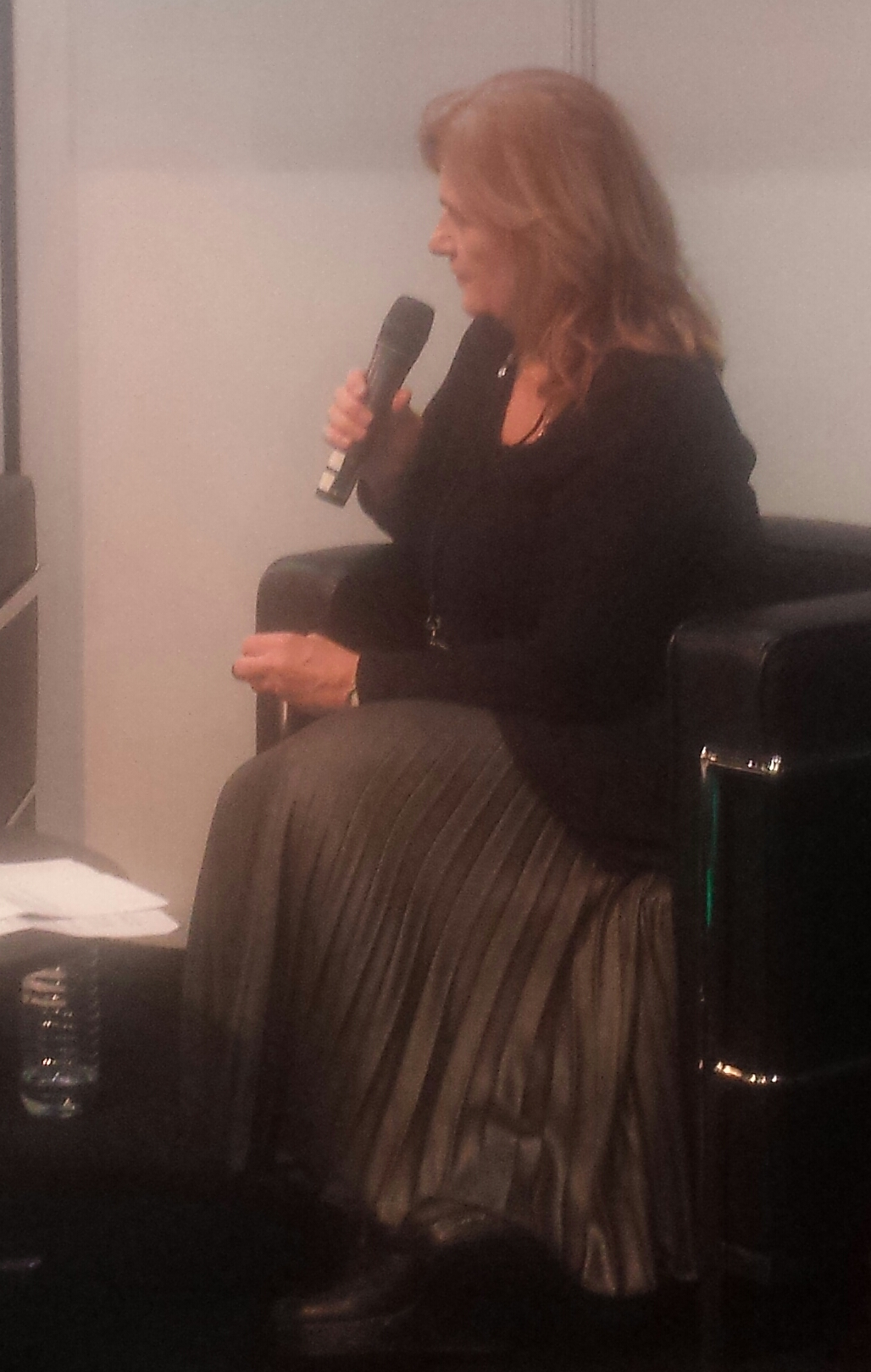
- Born: 1954 (age 71–72); Paris, France
- Writing career
- Genres: novel, critic, screenplay

Nathalie Petrowski (born 1954) is a French-born Canadian journalist and writer living in Quebec.

She was born in Paris, lived in the Lorraine region and came to Canada at the age of five. She attended the Collège International Marie de France and went on to receive a bachelor's degree in Communications from Concordia University in 1975. She began working for Le Journal de Montréal, joining Le Devoir in 1976, where her work appeared in the culture section. She also worked on television and radio. She joined La Presse in 1992.

In 1981, Petrowski received the Prix Jules Fournier for her contributions to the French language and the Prix Jules Fournier for her work in print journalism.

Her 1995 novel Maman last call was adapted by Petrowski for a 2005 film of the same name directed by François Bouvier. The film was nominated for a Genie Award in 2006 for best adapted screenplay.

She has written scripts for the television series Miss Météo and wrote the screenplay for the 2011 film Gerry.

Her spouse is the radio host Michel Lacombe.

== Selected works ==
- Il restera toujours le Nebraska, novel (1990)
- Jean-Claude Lauzon, le poète (2006)
