= Nicolas Bolduc =

Canadian cinematographer

- Born: March 5, 1973 (age 53); Montreal, Quebec, Canada
- Occupation: Cinematographer
- Awards: Canadian Screen Award for Best Cinematography

Nicolas Bolduc (born 5 March 1973) is a Canadian cinematographer from Montreal, Quebec. He won the Canadian Screen Award for Best Cinematography two years in a row, in the 1st Canadian Screen Awards and 2nd Canadian Screen Awards, for War Witch (2012) and Enemy (2013). He also won the Jutra Award for War Witch, and was nominated the next year for Louis Cyr. Bolduc was nominated for Best Cinematography at the Prix Iris in 2017 for Two Lovers and a Bear.

With Hochelaga, Land of Souls (2017), he competed at Camerimage, and won Best Cinematography at the 6th Canadian Screen Awards. He also won Best Cinematography at the 20th Quebec Cinema Awards for Hochelaga, Land of Souls.

He was one of four directors, alongside Fabrice Barrilliet, Julien Knafo and Marie-Hélène Panisset, of the 2009 collective film Blind Spot.

== Filmography ==
=== Film ===
Year	Title	Director	Notes
2000	The Invention of Love (L'invention de l'amour)	Claude Demers	
2003	How My Mother Gave Birth to Me During Menopause (Comment ma mère accoucha de moi durant sa ménopause)	Sébastien Rose	
2003	Juniper Tree (Le piège d'Issoudun)	Micheline Lanctôt	
2005	Life with My Father (La Vie avec mon père)	Sébastien Rose	
2005	Eve and the Fire Horse	Julia Kwan	
2008	Truffles (Truffe)	Kim Nguyen	
2008	Le Banquet	Sébastien Rose	
2009	Blind Spot (Lucidité passagère)	Himself; Fabrice Barrilliet; Julien Knafo; Marie-Hélène Panisset	
2010	City of Shadows (La Cité)	Kim Nguyen	With Giulio Pietromarchi
2010	Fatal	Michaël Youn	
2010	Die	Dominic James	
2011	Fear of Water (La Peur de l'eau)	Gabriel Pelletier	
2012	War Witch (Rebelle)	Kim Nguyen	
2012	Before My Heart Falls (Avant que mon cœur bascule)	Sébastien Rose	
2013	Louis Cyr (Louis Cyr, l'homme le plus fort du monde)	Daniel Roby	
2013	Enemy	Denis Villeneuve	
2014	Aloft (No Llores Vuela)	Claudia Llosa	
2016	Two Lovers and a Bear	Kim Nguyen	
2016	Chuck	Philippe Falardeau	
2017	Mr. & Mrs. Adelman	Nicolas Bedos	
2017	Hochelaga, Land of Souls (Hochelaga, terre des âmes)	François Girard	
2018	The Hummingbird Project	Kim Nguyen	
2019	La Belle Époque	Nicolas Bedos	
2021	Crisis	Nicholas Jarecki	
2022	American Dreamer	Paul Dektor	
2023	The Three Musketeers: D'Artagnan	Martin Bourboulon	Shot back-to-back
2023	The Three Musketeers: Milady	Martin Bourboulon	Shot back-to-back
2024	The Count of Monte Cristo	Alexandre de La Patellière; Matthieu Delaporte	
2025	13 Days, 13 Nights	Martin Bourboulon	
2026	Phantom of the Opera	Alexandre Castagnetti	

Short film

Year	Title	Director	Notes
2001	Des enfants de trop...	Myreille Bédard	
2004	Le bonheur est dans les prés mais parfois c'est au fond d'un océan de souffrance qu'on finit par le trouver	Marie-Hélène Panisset	
2007	Et si... l'espace d'un instant	Fabrice Barrilliet	
2007	Une femme de bien bonne humeur	Marie-Hélène Panisset	
2007	Can You Wave Bye-Bye?	Sarah Galea-Davis	
2007	My Name Is Victor Gazon (Mon nom est Victor Gazon)	Patrick Gazé	
2008	Next Floor	Denis Villeneuve	
2009	King Chicken	Himself	Also credited as writer and co-producer
2012	Denis Marleau	Kim Nguyen	
2018	Paseo	Matthew Hannam	

Documentary film

Year	Title	Director	Notes
2016	What Lies Below	Emanuel Hoss-Desmarais	With Nicolas Fransolet and Emanuel Hoss-Desmarais

=== Television ===
Year	Title	Director	Notes
2008	Collection Fred Vargas	Josée Dayan	Episode "Sous les vents de Neptune"
2021	The North Water	Andrew Haigh	Miniseries
2023	Lac-Mégantic: This Is Not an Accident	Philippe Falardeau	With Tobie Marier Robitaille, Sara Mishara, Van Royko, Alexia Toman and André Turpin
2024	Ourika	Marcela Said; Julien Despaux	3 episodes

== Awards and nominations ==
Award	Date of ceremony	Category	Film	Result	Ref.
Camerimage	2012	Golden Frog	War Witch (Rebelle)	Won	
Canadian Screen Awards/Genie Awards	2009	Best Cinematography	Le Banquet	Nominated	
Canadian Screen Awards/Genie Awards	2013	Best Cinematography	War Witch (Rebelle)	Won	
Canadian Screen Awards/Genie Awards	2014	Best Cinematography	Enemy	Won	
Canadian Screen Awards/Genie Awards	2018	Best Cinematography	Hochelaga, Land of Souls (Hochelaga, terre des âmes)	Won	
Canadian Society of Cinematographers	2009	Best Cinematography in a Dramatic Short	Next Floor	Won	
Canadian Society of Cinematographers	2011	Best Cinematography in a Theatrical Feature	City of Shadows (La Cité)	Won	
Canadian Society of Cinematographers	2014	Best Cinematography in a Theatrical Feature	Enemy	Won	
Canadian Society of Cinematographers	2018	Best Cinematography in a Theatrical Feature	Hochelaga, Land of Souls (Hochelaga, terre des âmes)	Won	
Canadian Society of Cinematographers	2020	Best Cinematography in a Theatrical Feature	La Belle Époque	Nominated	
Canadian Society of Cinematographers	2022	Best Cinematography in a Television Drama	The North Water	Nominated	
Canadian Society of Cinematographers	2024	Best Cinematography in a Theatrical Feature	The Three Musketeers: D'Artagnan	Won	
César Awards	2020	Best Cinematography	La Belle Époque	Nominated	
César Awards	2024	Best Cinematography	The Three Musketeers: D'Artagnan and The Three Musketeers: Milady	Nominated	
Gémeaux Awards	2024	Best Photography in a Documentary or Public Affairs Program	Lac-Mégantic: This Is Not an Accident (Lac-Mégantic : ceci n’est pas un accident) (with Erik Ljung, Tobie Marier Robitaille, Sara Mishara, Alexia Toman, Van Royko, André Turpin)	Won	
Prix Iris	2011	Best Cinematography	City of Shadows (La Cité)	Nominated	
Prix Iris	2013	Best Cinematography	War Witch (Rebelle)	Won	
Prix Iris	2014	Best Cinematography	Louis Cyr (Louis Cyr: L'homme le plus fort du monde)	Nominated	
Prix Iris	2015	Best Cinematography	Enemy	Nominated	
Prix Iris	2017	Best Cinematography	Two Lovers and a Bear	Nominated	
Prix Iris	2018	Best Cinematography	Hochelaga, Land of Souls (Hochelaga, terre des âmes)	Won	
