= Gerry Boulet =

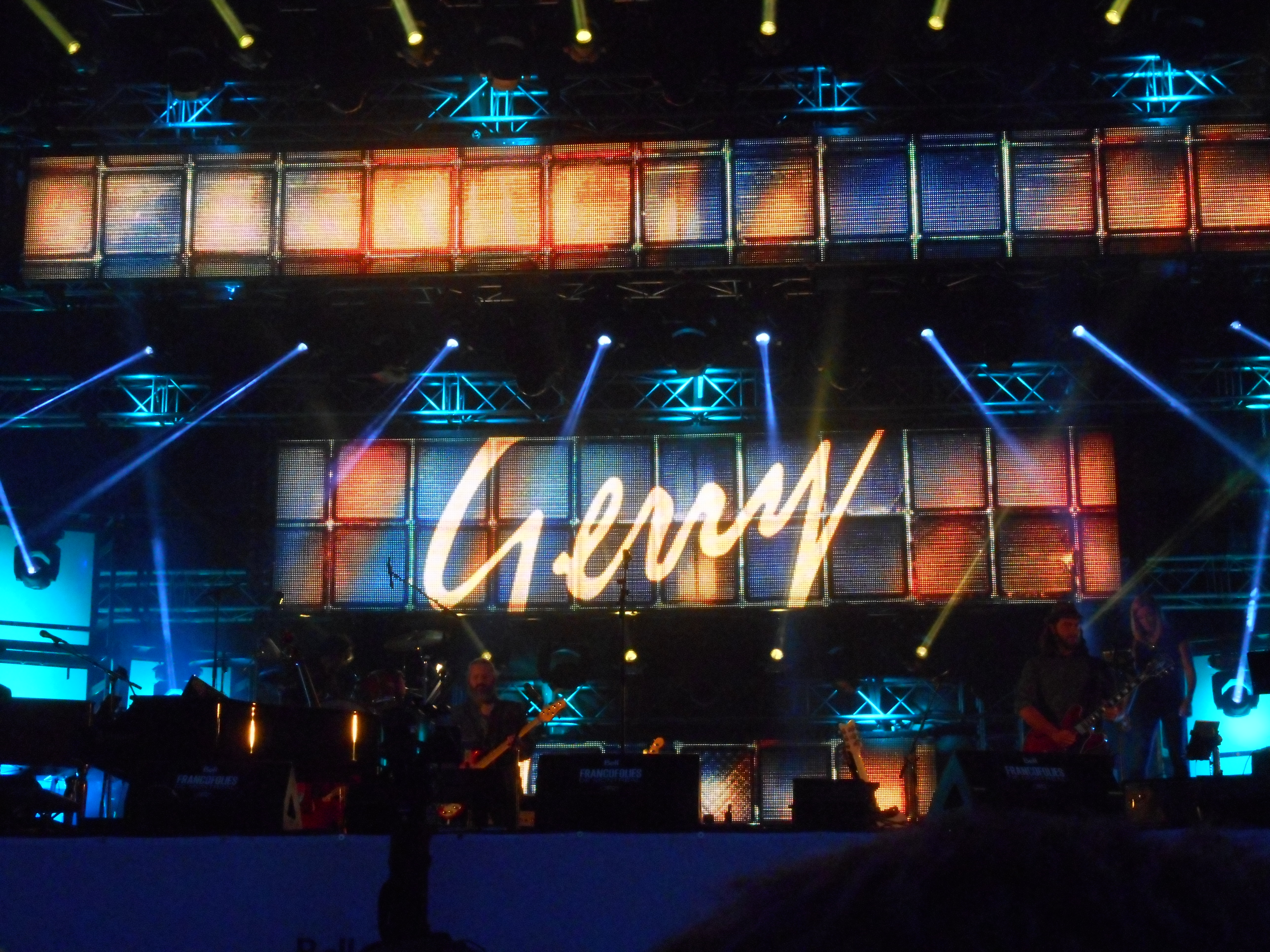
- Gerry À Grand Coups d'Amour

Background information
- Born: Joseph Gaétan Robert Gérald Boulet; March 1, 1946; Saint-Jean-sur-Richelieu, Quebec, Canada
- Origin: Saint-Jean-sur-Richelieu, Quebec
- Died: July 18, 1990 (aged 44) Longueuil, Quebec, Canada
- Genres: Rock
- Occupations: Singer, musician
- Instruments: Vocals, organ, piano, guitar, trumpet
- Years active: 1966–1990

Joseph Gaétan Robert Gérald (Gerry) Boulet (March 1, 1946 – July 18, 1990) was a French Canadian rock singer. He was most well known as the vocalist for the Quebec rock band Offenbach, he also released two solo albums. He was considered one of the innovators of rock music in French Quebec.

== Career ==
Born and raised in Saint-Jean-sur-Richelieu, he started in music with the band Les Gants Blancs (literally "The White Gloves"), which evolved into Offenbach, in 1969.

In 1985, Boulet recorded his first solo album, Presque 40 ans de blues. The following year, the band performed a farewell concert at the Montreal Forum.

In 1987, he was diagnosed with colon cancer. Boulet released his second solo album, Rendez-vous doux, in 1989. Some songs in this album clearly talk about his fight to stay alive. The album won him three Félix Awards in 1989 for Best Rock Album, Best Rock Concert, and Best Television Special.

On July 18, 1990, Boulet died in Montreal of cancer. Later that year, he won two more posthumous Félix Awards, including Song of the Year for "Un beau grand bateau" and a special tribute award.

Rendez-vous doux held the title of the best-selling album of all time by a Québécois artist through the early 1990s, until it was surpassed in 1996 by Céline Dion's D'eux.

== Legacy ==
In 1991, his solo debut was reissued under the new title Gerry, while in 1994 Dan Bigras produced a recording of Boulet's previously unreleased rock opera Jézabel.

Offenbach reunited in 1996, with Martin Deschamps on vocals. In 1998, the live album Gerry Boulet...en rappel was released.

Gerry, a biographical film about his life, was launched in theatres on June 15, 2011. The film was directed by Alain DesRochers, and stars Mario Saint-Amand as Boulet.

== Discography ==
- Presque 40 ans de blues (1984)
- Rendez-vous doux (1988)
- Gerry (1991)
- Jézabel (1994)
- Gerry Boulet...en rappel (1998)
