= Dominique Fortin =

Canadian film editor

Dominique Fortin (born 1961) is a Canadian film editor from Quebec, who has been a Genie Award and Jutra/Iris Award winner for her work.

== Filmography ==
- Le message de Cornipoli - 1989
- Quand l'accent devient grave - 1989
- Entre l'effort et l'oubli - 1990
- Uranium - 1990
- City of Champions - 1991
- Rispondetemi - 1991
- André Mathieu, musicien - 1993
- A Childhood in Natashquan (Une enfance à Natashquan) - 1993
- Women in Love (Les Amoureuses) - 1993
- Les seins dans la tête - 1994
- L'autre côté de la lune - 1994
- Hiroshima - 1995
- In My Own Time: Diary of a Cancer Patient - 1995
- Women: A True Story - 1995
- Les compagnons de Saint-Laurent - 1996
- Mistaken Identity (Erreur sur la personne) - 1996
- Murder Live! - 1997
- Prince Street - 1997
- Tomorrow Never Dies - 1997
- Ladies Room - 1999
- Sunshine - 1999
- The 6th Day - 2000
- The Matthew Shepard Story - 2002
- Seducing Doctor Lewis (La Grande séduction) - 2003
- How My Mother Gave Birth to Me During Menopause (Comment ma mère accoucha de moi durant sa ménopause) - 2003
- Ice Bound: A Woman's Survival at the South Pole - 2003
- Comment devenir un trou de cul et enfin plaire aux femmes - 2004
- Doux rendez-vous - 2004
- Head in the Clouds - 2004
- Hunt for Justice - 2005
- Gilles Carle: The Untamable Mind (Gilles Carle ou l'indomptable imaginaire) - 2005
- Life with My Father (La Vie avec mon père) - 2005
- Answered by Fire - 2006
- The Chinese Botanist's Daughters - 2006
- The Little Book of Revenge (Guide de la petite vengeance) - 2006
- Transparence - 2006
- Super Phoenix - 2007
- The American Trap (Le Piège américain) - 2008
- Le Banquet - 2008
- The Children of Huang Shi - 2008
- Mommy Is at the Hairdresser's (Maman est chez le coiffeur) - 2008
- Pag - 2008
- Patiences - 2008
- The Trojan Horse - 2008
- Face Time (Le baiser du barbu) - 2010
- A Life Begins (Une vie qui commence) - 2010
- Mirador - 2010
- Erased - 2012
- Upside Down (Un monde à l'envers) - 2012
- Meetings with a Young Poet - 2013
- Dr. Cabbie - 2014
- Elephant Song - 2014
- This Life - 2015-17
- Double Sentence - 2016
- iFeel - 2016
- Of Ink and Blood (D'Encre et de sang) - 2016
- The Other Side of November (L'autre côté de novembre) - 2016
- Family First (Chien de garde) - 2018
- The Beach House - 2018
- The Sticky Side of Baklava (La face cachée du baklava) - 2020
- Solo - 2023

== Awards ==
Award	Year	Category	Work	Result	Ref(s)
American Cinema Editors Awards	1995	Best Edited Miniseries or Motion Picture for Television	Hiroshima (with Denis Papillon, John Soh, Mark Conte)	Won	
Genie Awards	2004	Best Editing	Seducing Doctor Lewis (La Grande séduction)	Nominated	
Genie Awards	2005	Best Editing	Head in the Clouds	Won	
Genie Awards	2009	Best Editing	Mommy Is at the Hairdresser's (Maman est chez le coiffeur)	Nominated	
Genie Awards	2009	Best Editing	Le Banquet (with Carina Baccanale)	Nominated	
Jutra Awards	2004	Best Editing	Seducing Doctor Lewis (La Grande séduction)	Won	
Jutra Awards	2009	Best Editing	Le Banquet (with Carina Baccanale)	Nominated	
Jutra Awards	2014	Best Editing	Erased	Nominated	
Prix Iris	2016	Best Editing	Elephant Song	Nominated	
Prix Iris	2018	Best Editing	Family First (Chien de garde)	Won	
Prix Iris	2024	Best Editing	Solo with Marie-Pier Dupuis, Maxim Rheault	Nominated	
Primetime Emmy Awards	1996	Outstanding Picture Editing for a Limited or Anthology Series or Movie	Hiroshima (with Denis Papillon, John Soh)	Nominated	
