= Love Me (1991 film) =

1991 Canadian drama film

- French: Love-moi
- Directed by: Marcel Simard
- Written by: Marcel Simard; Lise Lemay-Rousseau
- Produced by: François Bouvier; Doris Girard; Marcel Simard
- Starring: Germain Houde; Paule Baillargeon; Lucie Laurier
- Cinematography: Pierre Letarte
- Edited by: Michel Arcand
- Music by: Robert Léger; Frédéric Weber
- Production companies: National Film Board of Canada; Les Productions du Lundi Matin; Les Productions Virage
- Distributed by: Aska Film
- Release date: 15 February 1991
- Running time: 95 minutes
- Country: Canada
- Language: French

Love Me (French: Love-moi) is a Canadian drama film, directed by Marcel Simard and released in 1991. The film stars Germain Houde as Charles, a theatre director who enlists a troubled group of street youths to write and perform in a theatre show about their lives after one of their gang is murdered.

The cast includes Paule Baillargeon, Mario Saint-Amand, Yvon Roy, Lucie Laurier, Sonia Laplante, Éric Brisebois, Dominique Leduc, Lyne Durocher, Hugolin Chevrette, Stéphane Demers, Denis Bouchard, Claire Pimparé, Marc Désourdy, Ducarmel Cyrius, Léa-Marie Cantin and Lénie Scoffié.

The film premiered in theatres in February 1991.

Jo Caron, Yvon Benoît and Michel Descombes received a Genie Award nomination for Best Overall Sound at the 12th Genie Awards.
