= The Dark Hours =

- Official poster
- Directed by: Paul Fox
- Written by: Wil Zmak
- Produced by: Brent Barclay
- Starring: Kate Greenhouse; Aidan Devine; Gordon Currie; Iris Graham; Dov Tiefenbach
- Cinematography: Steve Cosens
- Edited by: Marlo Miazga
- Music by: E.C. Woodley
- Production companies: Calder Road Films; The Feature Film Project
- Distributed by: Capri Releasing
- Release dates: March 11, 2005 (Kingston Canadian Film Festival); November 11, 2005 (Canada)
- Running time: 80 minutes
- Country: Canada
- Language: English
- Budget: $500,000

The Dark Hours is a 2005 Canadian horror film directed by Paul Fox and written by Wil Zmak.

== Synopsis ==
A woman's mistakes come back to haunt her in a terrifying and very literal manner in this mind-bending thriller. Dr. Samantha Goodman (Kate Greenhouse) is a clinical psychiatrist who works with patients at an institution for the criminally insane. Things have not been rosy for Sam lately—she's been violently attacked by one of her patients, her marriage to husband David (Gordon Currie) is in bad shape, and she has an inoperable brain tumor that's growing at an alarming rate.

Sam needs a weekend away from the city, but what David has set up isn't especially relaxing for her—a short holiday at a remote cabin, where David will be editing his latest book with the help of Sam's younger, attractive sister Melody (Iris Graham). As Sam watches sparks begin to fly between her sister and her husband, Harlan Pyne (Aidan Devine) and his friend Adrian (Dov Tiefenbach) break into the cabin and announce their presence by shooting Sam's pet dog.

Harlan is a convicted sex offender and murderer who was placed under Sam's care in the institution and wasn't happy with the experimental treatment he received; having escaped, he and Adrian have tracked her down and decide to take revenge by forcing Sam, Melody, and David to participate in a series of strange and humiliating games.

== Cast ==
- Kate Greenhouse as Dr. Samantha Goodman
- Aidan Devine as Harlan Pyne
- Gordon Currie as David Goodman
- Iris Graham as Melody
- Dov Tiefenbach as Adrian
- Bruce McFee as Donald Wegman
- Kathryn Haggis as Waitress
- David Calderisi as Dr. Lew Lanigan
- Jeff Seymour as Radiologist
- Trevor Hayes as Doctor

== Release ==
The Dark Hours debuted at the Kingston Canadian Film Festival on March 11, 2005. The film received a theatrical release on November 11, 2005, through Capri Releasing.

== Reception ==
On review aggregator Rotten Tomatoes, The Dark Hours received an approval rating of 62% based on thirteen reviews, with an average rating of 5.9/10. On Metacritic, the film holds a rating of 63 out of 100 from five reviews, indicating "generally favorable reviews".

== Awards and Festivals ==
The Dark Hours garnered recognition and awards from numerous international festivals, including Montreal's Fantasia Film Festival, Scotland's Dead By Dawn Film Festival, Austin's Fantastic Fest and the Sitges-Catelonian International Film Festival in Spain.

Despite winning several international awards, The Dark Hours (like many Canadian films) received no U.S. distribution beyond a one-week run at the indie-friendly Pioneer cinema in New York City. In his book The Long Tail, Wired editor Chris Anderson states that the film suffered more than any other film released that year from the inefficiencies of theatrical distribution. A further review on his blog confirmed his judgement that the film did not lack for quality at all, only for marketing and distribution.

- 2005 Best Film – New York City Horror Film Festival
- 2005 Best Film – Austin Fantastic Fest
- 2005 Best Film – Puchon International Film Festival (Korea)
- 2005 Best Film – Dead By Dawn Film Festival (Scotland)
- 2005 Best Film – Eerie Horror Film Festival
- 2005 Jury Award – Sitges-Catelonian International Film Festival
- 2005 Best Horror Feature and Best Director – Phoenix International Horror & Sci-Fi Festival

Invited to the Chicago International Film Festival, Amsterdam Fantastic Film Festival, Fantasia International Film Festival (Montreal), Macabro Film Festival (Mexico City), German Fantasy Film Festival, Malaga Film Festival (Spain), and the Cardiff Film Festival

== See also ==
- List of films featuring home invasions
