= How My Mother Gave Birth to Me During Menopause =

- French: Comment ma mère accoucha de moi durant sa ménopause
- Directed by: Sébastien Rose
- Written by: Sébastien Rose
- Produced by: Roger Frappier; Luc Vandal
- Starring: Micheline Lanctôt; Paul Ahmarani; Sylvie Moreau; Patrick Huard; Anne-Marie Cadieux
- Cinematography: Nicolas Bolduc
- Edited by: Dominique Fortin
- Release date: 2003
- Running time: 99 minutes
- Country: Canada
- Language: French

How My Mother Gave Birth to Me During Menopause (French: Comment ma mère accoucha de moi durant sa ménopause) is a film by directed by Sébastien Rose, released in 2003. The film won that year's Claude Jutra Award for the best Canadian feature film by a first-time director.

The film's cast includes Micheline Lanctôt, Paul Ahmarani, Lucie Laurier, Sylvie Moreau, Patrick Huard and Anne-Marie Cadieux.

== Synopsis ==
How My Mother Gave Birth to Me During Her Menopause is about Jean-Charles (Paul Ahmarani), a 30-year-old working on his thesis about men's role in a post-feminist world, who lives with his domineering mother (Micheline Lanctôt) and sister (Sylvie Moreau), both of whom are sleeping with the gardener (Patrick Huard). To further complicate matters, Jean-Charles is having an affair with his shrink (Anne-Marie Cadieux) who reports back to his mother.
