= 2010 Winter Paralympics opening ceremony =

- Part of 2010 Winter Paralympics
- Date: March 12, 2010
- Venue: BC Place
- Location: Vancouver, British Columbia, Canada
- Theme: One Inspires Many
- Filmed by: Olympic Broadcasting Services (OBS)
- Footage: Full opening ceremony on the official PRP YouTube channel on YouTube

The opening ceremony of the 2010 Winter Paralympics, or the X Paralympic Winter Games were held on March 12, 2010 beginning at 6:00 pm PST (02:00 UTC, March 13) at the BC Place Stadium in Vancouver, British Columbia, Canada. The opening ceremony's theme was "One Inspires Many", and featured over 5000 local performers. The 2 hour long ceremony was produced by Vancouver-based Patrick Roberge Productions Inc

The event was officially opened by Governor General Michaëlle Jean, representative of Elizabeth II, Queen of Canada.

== Programme ==
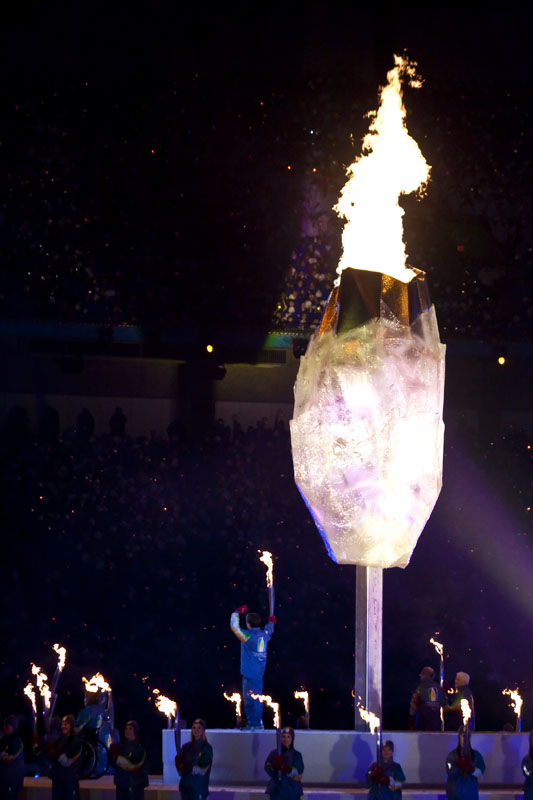
The 2010 Paralympic cauldron, lit by Zachary Beaumont, 15, from Delta

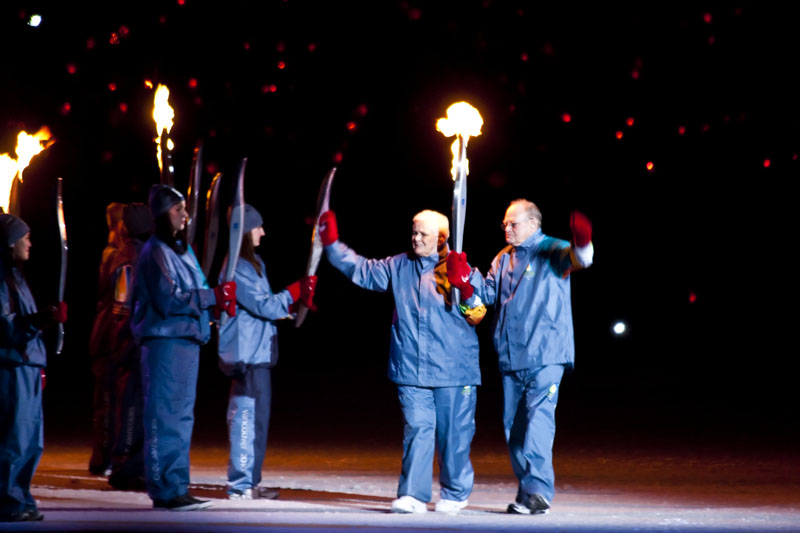
Betty and Rolly Fox, the parents of Terry Fox, carried the Paralympic torch into the stadium

=== National anthem ===
Canada's national anthem, "O Canada", was performed by singer Terry Kelly, a blind former Paralympian. Mari Klassen signed the anthem in American Sign Language (ASL). Hundreds of children stood in the shape of a maple leaf in a formation.

=== Parade of the Nations ===
The participating countries entered in alphabetical order of their country names in English, except for host nation, Canada, entering last. Canada has the greatest number of athletes with 55.

=== Artistic section ===
- Luca Patuelli
- Dal Richards and his orchestra, and Michael Kaeshammer Joined by trumpet player Bria Skonberg and saxophonist Evan Arntzen.
- Martin Deschamps
- Fefe Dobson performed the songs "I Want You" and "Watch Me Move". Aaron "Wheelz" Fotheringham, Nikki Yanofsky and others performed.

=== Entry of the Paralympic Flag ===
The flag was carried into the stadium. It was then transferred to members of the Canadian Forces' Soldier On program: Sgt. Karen McCoy, and Master Cpl. Mike Trauner, who then raised the flag.

=== Paralympic Oaths ===
Canadian ice sledge hockey player Herve Lord took the athlete's oath as a representative of each of the participating Paralympic competitors. Canadian curling official Linda Kirton took the official's oath on behalf of each officiating Paralympic referee or other official.

=== Lighting of the Cauldron ===
The final torch bearer was 15-year-old snowboarder Zachary Beaumont, who is an amputee. He died in 2025.

== Dignitaries and other officials in attendance ==
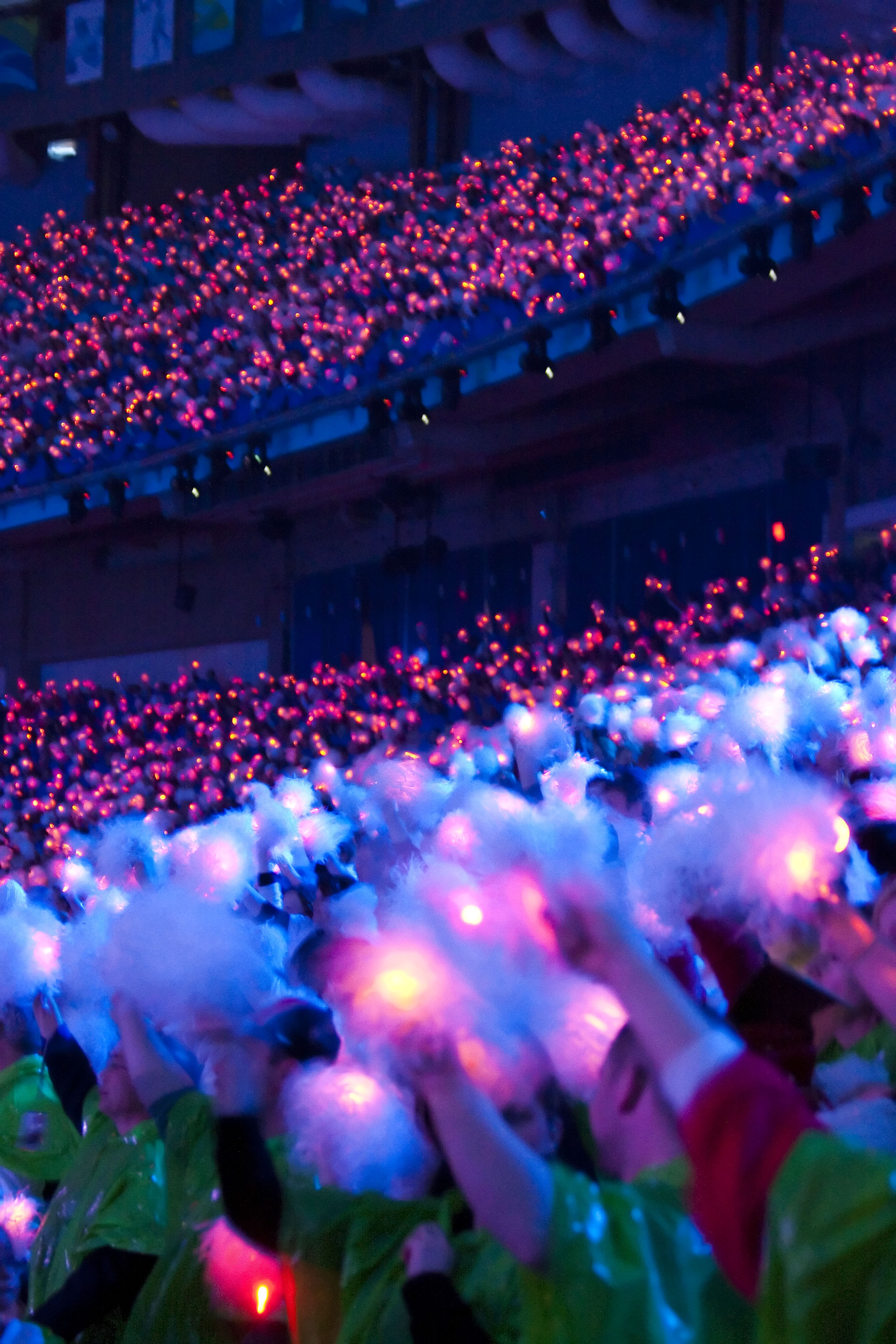
60,000 spectators in blue, white and green plastic ponchos, waved lighted pom-poms

- Michaëlle Jean, Governor General of Canada
- Jean-Daniel Lafond, Viceregal consort of Canada
- Stephen Harper, Prime Minister of Canada
- Gordon Campbell, Premier of British Columbia, and his wife Nancy Campbell
- Sam Sullivan, Canada's Paralympic Ambassador, former Mayor of Vancouver
- Sir Philip Craven, President of the International Paralympic Committee
- Jacques Rogge, President of the International Olympic Committee

== Media coverage ==
Live broadcast:

- Canada: CTV Vancouver
- South Korea: SBS
- Spain: TVE
- France: France 2
- New Zealand: Sky Sport
- Sweden: SVT

The ceremony was aired live on ParalympicSport.TV, and approximately two hours after it ended, it became available as Video on Demand (VOD).

Delayed coverage:

- Russia: RTR
- Norway: NRK
- Ukraine: NTU
- Canada: CTV (full coverage)
- United States: NBC
- Australia: ABC

Originally, the host nation's TV broadcaster, CTV, did not plan to air the opening ceremony live. After receiving criticism on the decision, CTV changed its mind and decided to air the ceremony live in Vancouver region. But regions outside of Vancouver continued to air the ceremony tape delayed.

== See also ==
- 2010 Winter Olympics opening ceremony
