= 2009 in Canadian television =

The following is a list of events affecting Canadian television in 2009. Events listed include television show debuts, finales, cancellations, and channel launches, closures and rebrandings.

== Events ==
Date	Event
March 29	2009 Juno Awards
April 4	29th Genie Awards
May 31	Sébastien Tremblay, runner up of the fourth season of Loft Story wins the sixth and final season of Loft Story, under the title of Loft Story : La revanche.
June 30	Channel Zero announces they have purchased CHCH and CJNT, and saved both stations from closure. The deal is awaiting approval from the Canadian Radio-television and Telecommunications Commission (CRTC).
August 31	The last scheduled day of broadcast for E! and its affiliate CHCA in Red Deer, along with A station CKNX-TV in Wingham, Ontario as CTVglobemedia converted it to a rebroadcaster of CFPL-TV in London, Ontario. The demise of the E! system also caused co-owned CHBC-TV in Kelowna, British Columbia to switch to the Global Television Network. Also, Channel Zero closes in on acquiring CHCH Hamilton & CJNT Montreal. In addition, French language Quebec TV network TQS is renamed as V.
September 4	Canwest announces they have sold CHEK-TV to local investors, 4 days after the station's scheduled last day of broadcast.
October 2	CKX-TV goes off the air after 54 years of broadcasting.
October 19	A Canadian version of DIY Network launches in Canada, replacing Fine Living under a new license.
October 21	The CBC announced that CBC Newsworld would be re-branded as CBC News Network. The rebranding took place on October 26.
November 2	Discovery Kids Canada was replaced by a Canadian version of Nickelodeon, also under a new license.
November 14	2009 Gemini Awards

== Television programs ==
=== Programs debuting in 2009 ===
Show	Station	Premiere Date
Being Erica	CBC	January 5
Wild Roses	CBC	January 6
Howie Do It	Global	January 9
Total Drama Action	Teletoon	January 11
ZOS: Zone of Separation	The Movie Network/Movie Central	January 19
Jimmy Two-Shoes	Teletoon	February 21
The Listener	CTV	March 1
In Real Life	YTV	March 4
Pretty Cure	YTV	March 6
League of Super Evil	YTV	March 7
The Line	The Movie Network/Movie Central	March 16
CP24 Breakfast	CP24	March 26
Bob & Doug	Global	April 19
Producing Parker	TVtropolis	May 4
Stoked!	Teletoon	June 25
Conviction Kitchen	Citytv	September 13
The Foundation	Showcase	September 13
Make the Politician Work	CBC	September 13
The Ron James Show	CBC Television	September 25
Battle of the Blades	CBC Television	October 4
My Rona Home	Citytv	October 4
TV with TV's Jonathan Torrens	TVTropolis	October 9
Connect with Mark Kelley	CBC News Network	October 26
The Lang and O'Leary Exchange	CBC News Network	October 26
Power & Politics	CBC News Network	October 26
Cra$h & Burn	Showcase	November 18

=== Programs ending in 2009 ===
Show	Station	Cancelled
Sophie	CBC	March 23
Life with Derek	Family	March 25
Storm Hawks	YTV	April 6
Corner Gas	CTV	April 13
Kim's Rude Awakenings	W Network	May 4
Ricky Sprocket: Showbiz Boy	Teletoon	May 4
The Best Years	Global	May 15
CBC News: Sunday Night	CBC	May 31
Grossology	YTV	October 24

=== Films and miniseries ===
- Booky's Crush - CBC
- Soul - VisionTV
- The Summit - CBC

== Deaths ==
Date	Name	Age	Notability
July 21	Les Lye	84	Canadian TV actor and broadcaster (You Can't Do That On Television)
August 23	Ryan Jenkins	32	Canadian businessman and reality television participant; Alleged killer of American-born ex-wife Jasmine Fiore (Megan Wants a Millionaire)
October 23	Lou Jacobi	95	Canadian-born American television and film actor (The Dean Martin Show, The Man From U.N.C.L.E., That Girl)

== Television stations ==
=== Network affiliation changes ===
Date	Market	Station	Channel	Old affiliation	New affiliation	References
July 14	Kamloops, British Columbia	CFJC-TV	4 (analogue)	Independent; CH/E!	Citytv	
July 14	Prince George, British Columbia	CKPG-TV	2 (analogue)	Independent; CH/E!	Citytv	
August 31	Kelowna, British Columbia	CHBC-TV	2 (analogue)	Independent; CH/E!	Global	

=== Closures ===
Date	Market	Station	Channel	Affiliation	Notes
August 31	Red Deer, Alberta	CHCA-TV	6	E!	
October 2	Brandon, Manitoba	CKX-TV	5 (analogue)	CBC	

== See also ==
- 2009 in Canada
- List of Canadian films of 2009
