= Joanne Boland =

Canadian actress

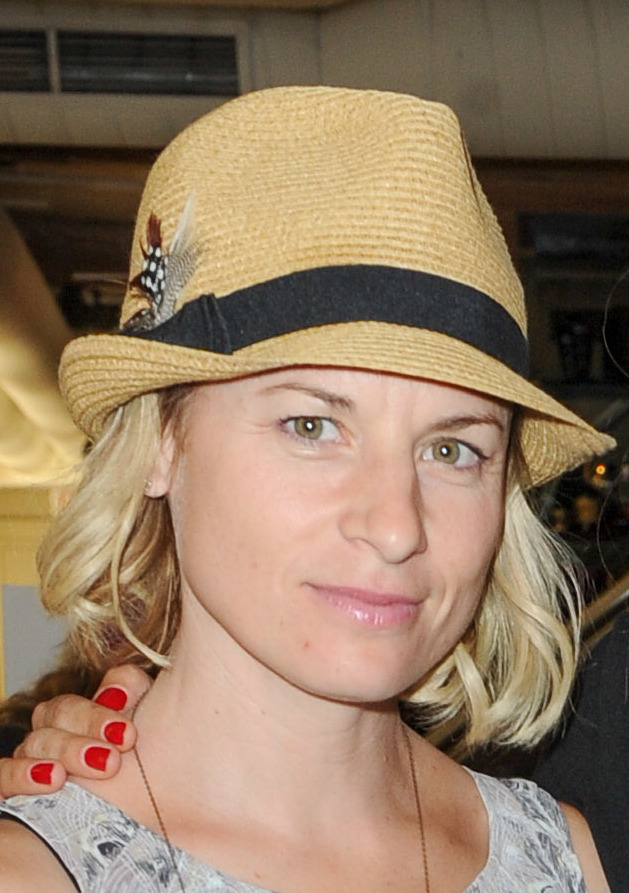
Boland in 2015

Joanne Boland (born November 27, 1975) is a Canadian actress, best known for her regular role as Dana in the television series Train 48.

Originally from Brampton, Ontario, she began her acting career in the late 1990s with stage roles, before beginning to appear in film and television in the early 2000s. At the time she was also performing in the Toronto area as a singer-songwriter, although after she was cast in Train 48 her musical career took a back seat due to the demands of filming a regular leading role in a daily television series, although her character in the show was also written as a musician. She first came to the attention of the Train 48 producers after a three-episode story arc in Blue Murder.

Following the end of Train 48 she had a recurring role as Margaret in Slings & Arrows. Her later television roles have included recurring roles in ZOS: Zone of Separation, Being Erica, Copper, Gangland Undercover, Strange Empire. and Chapelwaite.

In film her roles have included former prime minister Kim Campbell in the 2011 satirical film Mulroney: The Opera, and Elisha Devine in The Well.

She married actor Dylan Trowbridge in 2003.
