= Le Banquet =

- Directed by: Sébastien Rose
- Written by: Sébastien Rose; Hubert-Yves Rose
- Produced by: Pierre Even
- Starring: Alexis Martin; Raymond Bouchard; Benoît McGinnis; Catherine De Léan
- Cinematography: Nicolas Bolduc
- Edited by: Carina Baccanale; Dominique Fortin
- Production company: Cirrus Communications
- Distributed by: Alliance Atlantis
- Release date: August 26, 2008; (MWFF)
- Running time: 95 minutes
- Country: Canada
- Language: French

Le Banquet is a Canadian drama film from Quebec, directed by Sébastien Rose and released in 2008. The film's original working title was Comme une flamme.

Set at an unnamed university in Montreal amidst the backdrop of a student strike over rising tuition fees, the film centres on Bertrand (Alexis Martin), an idealistic young professor who battles the university administration after it refuses to expel a problem student (Benoît McGinnis) who is being disruptive in Bertrand's class.

== Cast ==
- Larissa Corriveau as Karine
- Benoît McGinnis as Gilbert
- Frédéric Pierre as Louis-Ferdinand
- Raymond Bouchard as Jean-Marc - Recteur
- Alexis Martin as Bertrand
- Catherine De Léan as Natasha
- Émile Proulx-Cloutier as Stéphane
- Maxime Le Flaguais s Marcel
- Yves Jacques as Rivard
- Paul Ahmarani as Réalisateur

== Award nominations ==
The film garnered five Genie Award nominations at the 29th Genie Awards in 2009:

- Best Supporting Actor: McGinnis
- Best Cinematography: Nicolas Bolduc
- Best Overall Sound: Mario Auclair, Luc Boudrias and François Senneville
- Best Editing: Dominique Fortin and Carina Baccanale
- Best Sound Editing: François Senneville, Antoine Morin and Carole Gagnon

It did not win any of the awards.

It received three Jutra Award nominations at the 11th Jutra Awards, for Best Actor (Martin), Best Editing (Fortin, Baccanale) and Best Costume Design (Ginette Magny).
