= Raymond Bouchard =

Canadian actor (1945–2026)

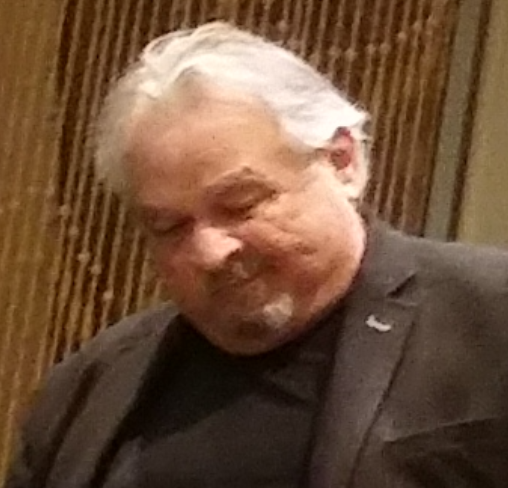
- Born: 7 March 1945; Lévis, Quebec, Canada
- Died: 21 February 2026 (aged 80); Verdun, Quebec, Canada
- Occupation: Actor

Raymond Bouchard (7 March 1945 – 21 February 2026) was a Canadian film, television, and stage actor. He was most noted for his performances in the film Seducing Doctor Lewis (La Grande séduction), for which he received Genie Award and Prix Jutra nominations for Best Actor in 2004, and the television series L'Or et le Papier, for which he won the Prix Gémeaux for Best Actor in a Drama Series in 1990.

== Life and career ==
Bouchard was born in Lévis, Quebec on 7 March 1945. His other performances included the television series Scoop, Virginie, Chartrand et Simonne and Trudeau (in which he played Jean Marchand), and the films Stop, The Conquest (La Conquête), Cordélia, Red Eyes (Les Yeux rouges), Ding et Dong, La Florida, Nitro, Le Banquet, Life with My Father (La Vie avec mon père), Bluff, Funkytown, and Death Dive (Le Scaphandrier).

Bouchard died in Verdun, Quebec on 21 February 2026, at the age of 80.
