= Truffles (film) =

2008 Canadian satirical science fiction film

- French: Truffe
- Directed by: Kim Nguyen
- Written by: Kim Nguyen
- Produced by: Kim Nguyen; Michel Martin; Renée Gosselin
- Starring: Roy Dupuis; Céline Bonnier; Pierre Lebeau
- Cinematography: Nicolas Bolduc
- Edited by: Richard Comeau
- Music by: Julien Knafo; DJ Champion
- Production company: Christal Films
- Release date: July 3, 2008 (Fantasia)
- Running time: 75 minutes
- Country: Canada
- Language: French

Truffles (French: Truffe) is a Canadian satirical science fiction film, written and directed by Kim Nguyen and released in 2008. Centred in a world in which global warming has turned the Hochelaga-Maisonneuve neighbourhood in Montreal into a mecca of wild truffles, the film stars Roy Dupuis and Céline Bonnier as Charles and Alice, the owners of a diner in the neighbourhood who are hired by a large corporation to find and harvest the delicacies, only to become embroiled in a nefarious body snatching plot.

The cast also includes Pierre Lebeau, Danielle Proulx, Jean-Nicolas Verreault, Michèle Richard, Paul Ahmarani and Danny Gilmore in supporting roles.

== Production ==
The film was shot in spring 2007. Its theme music was a cover of "I Put a Spell on You", recorded by DJ Champion with vocals by Béatrice Bonifassi.

== Distribution ==
It premiered in July 2008 at 2008 Fantasia Film Festival, before going into commercial release in August.

== Critical response ==
Dennis Harvey of Variety wrote that the film "is striking enough visually to overcome the sly script’s slightly undernourished aftertaste, with ace contributions from production designer Mario Hervieux and lenser Nicolas Bolduc. Coldly minimalist corporate HQ, atmospheric underground truffle mines and 1950s-flavored diner/apartment settings all testify to the pic’s imagination within modest production means."

For Exclaim!, Robert Bell wrote that "Acting as a low budget and slightly less pretentious The Matrix — at least from a philosophical perspective — with a distinctively French-Canadian quirkiness, Truffe proves to be one of the more entertaining indictments of corporate psychosis and blind conformity out there. Much of this comes from its distinguishable aesthetic sense, as the film is shot entirely in black and white and is framed with comic book precision, along with its tendency to show rather than tell, which is refreshing given the loads of pedagogy being served."
