= Public Domain (film) =

- Directed by: Kris Lefcoe
- Produced by: Jeff Rogers; Kris Lefcoe; Walter Gasparovic
- Starring: Nicole de Boer; Mike Beaver; Lindy Booth; Dov Tiefenbach
- Cinematography: John Choi
- Edited by: Charlotte Disher
- Release date: October 2003
- Running time: 90 minutes
- Country: Canada
- Language: English

Public Domain is a 2003 Canadian film about reality TV. It was directed by Kris Lefcoe and stars Nicole de Boer, Mike Beaver, Lindy Booth and Dov Tiefenbach. The film is openly critical of reality TV and portrays the hosts and producers as cruel and heartless people.

== Plot synopsis ==
Public Domain is a reality TV game show in which the producers infiltrate the contestants' homes without their knowledge and place them under surveillance for the world to see. In a Big Brother-style twist, viewers vote for who they think is the funniest and most dysfunctional contestant, and the top three based on these votes are chosen as the finalists.

== Cast ==
- Nicole de Boer as Bonnie
- Don McKellar as Host
- Nadia Litz as Terry
- Mike Beaver as Peter
- Lindy Booth as Monica
- Dov Tiefenbach as Tommy
- Salvatore Antonio as Don
- Jamie Johnston as Ian
- Krista Sutton as Anchor

== Critical reception ==
Public Domain received mostly positive reviews, although many critics did not choose to review the movie. For example, the movie scored 57% at Rotten Tomatoes but only received seven reviews. Dennis Harvey from Variety did not give the movie a score, however the text of the review was borderline positive.

However, Stephen Cole from The Globe and Mail gave Public Domain a negative review, saying that all characters but Don McKellar seem trapped in a mean, deadening satire and Ed Gonzalez from Slant Magazine gave it 1.5 stars out of 5 - comparing it to Big Brother and saying its muddled intent and miscalculated presentation gets at nothing.

Public Domain premiered at Resfest Toronto in October 2003, before touring the film festivals of the United States. The film won the Best Feature award at the Beverly Hills Film Festival 2004.
