= Dov Tiefenbach =

Canadian actor and musician (born 1981)

- Born: Dov Yosef Tiefenbach; December 8, 1981 (age 44); Toronto, Ontario, Canada
- Occupation: Actor
- Years active: 1994–present

Dov Yosef Tiefenbach (born December 8, 1981) is a Canadian actor and musician.

== Life and career ==
Tiefenbach was born on December 8, 1981, in Toronto, Ontario. He is Jewish. He began his acting career at age 12, starting in commercials, before playing the role of Josh Avery in the television series RoboCop (1994). Tiefenbach landed his first starring role as Murray Murray in the short film Love Child (1995) alongside actress Neve Campbell.

After those pivotal first projects, Tiefenbach was cast as the lead role Nick Burns in the 1996 Broadway production A Thousand Clowns alongside actor Judd Hirsch. After returning to Toronto, his name began circulating as Tiefenbach worked his way further into the film industry, starring in the lead roles of both Little Men and Cheaters. In 2003, Tiefenbach won a Leo Award for Best Supporting Male Performance in Flower & Garnet (2002).

Tiefenbach's most recent roles include the reclusive writer Lucky Carroway in the television series This Space for Rent (2006), the troubled young Adrian in the psychological thriller The Dark Hours (2005), and the hippie drug dealer Bradley Thomas in the comedy Harold & Kumar Go to White Castle (2004).

Before moving to Los Angeles, Tiefenbach was the frontman for the Toronto-based "dirty indie pop" band Theresa's Sound-World (named after a Sonic Youth song).

== Filmography ==
=== Film ===
Year	Title	Role	Notes
1994	You Love Me I Hate You	Eric	
1995	Tommy Boy	Kid at Lake	
1995	It Takes Two	Harry Butkis Jr.	
1996	Harriet the Spy	Boy with Purple Socks	
1996	Love Child	Murray Murray	Short film
1998	The Mighty	Doghouse Boy #1	
2000	Cheaters	Irwin Flickas	
2001	Get Over It	Little Steve	
2001	One of Them	Reggie	Short film
2001	Knockaround Guys	Teeze	
2001	On the Line	High School Kid	
2001	Jason X	Azreal	
2002	Flower & Garnet	Ronnie	
2002	Between Strangers	Matt	
2003	Detention	Willy Lopez	
2003	The Delicate Art of Parking	Lonny Goosen	
2003	Public Domain	Tommy	
2004	Against the Ropes	Organic Clerk	
2004	Harold & Kumar Go to White Castle	Hippie Student	
2005	The Dark Hours	Adrian	
2005	The Archer	Tony	Short film
2005	Fallen	Greg P.	Short film
2006	Snow Cake	Jack the Optician	
2007	The Day the Dead Weren't Dead	Stewart 'The Sauce' Jackson	Short film
2008	Happiending	Mr. Chicken	Short film
2008	Parasomnia	Billy Dornboss	
2008	Conversation with the Supplicant	Main Character	Short film
2009	You Might as Well Live	Hershey Hersenfield	
2010	Sympathy for Delicious	Oogie	
2010	Polish Bar	Moises	
2011	Boy Toy	Ronnie	
2011	The FP	Triple Decka 1K	
2011	A Holiday Heist	Bert	
2011	The Napkin	Robin	Short film
2012	Literally, Right Before Aaron	Best Man	Short film
2012	What Happens When Robert Leaves the Room.	Mel	Short film
2014	Asthma	Logan Backer	
2014	Pretend We're Kissing	Benny	
2017	We Forgot to Break Up	Will Sacco	
2017	Molly's Game	Club Customer	
2025	It Feeds	Larry	

=== Television ===
Year	Title	Role	Notes
1994	RoboCop	Josh Avery	2 episodes
1994	Squawk Box	Various	Main cast member
1995	The NeverEnding Story	Meeka (voice)	Episode: "Spook City"
1996	Radiant City	Joel	TV movie
1996	The Magic School Bus	Caller (voice)	2 episodes
1996	Beyond the Call	Mark's Friend	TV movie
1996	Goosebumps	Tim Swanson	Episode: "Bad Hare Day"
1998	Eerie, Indiana: The Other Dimension	Specialist	Episode: "Last Laugh"
1998	Goosebumps	Fred	2 episodes
1998	Little Men	Jack Ford	4 episodes
1999	Dear America: Dreams in the Golden Country	Yitzy Silver	TV short
1999	Animorphs	Erek	2 episodes
1999	Relic Hunter	Marty Billings	Episode: "Flag Day"
2000	Trapped in a Purple Haze	Kyle McCusker	TV movie
2000	Cheaters	Irwin Flickas	TV movie
2001	Wolf Girl	Ryan Klein	TV movie
2002	Witchblade	Jagger	3 episodes
2002	I Love Mummy	Trevor	3 episodes
2004	Doc	Larry	Episode: "Nip, Tuck and Die"
2004	Wonderfalls	Rufus	Episode: "Safety Canary"
2005	Tilt	Crackle	6 episodes
2006	This Space for Rent	Lucky Carroway	Episode: "Stain'd"
2006	Billable Hours	Stu Berger	8 episodes
2006	CSI: Crime Scene Investigation	Anthony Himmer	Episode: "Fannysmackin'"
2009	10 Items or Less	Barry	Episode: "Star Trok"
2010, 2011	Detroit 1-8-7	JJ Zagorski	2 episodes
2012	CSI: NY	Walter Danzig	Episode: "Kill Screen"
2012	Perception	Andre Lustig	Episode: "Kilimanjaro"
2017	Save Me	Photographer	Episode: "Possible Anaphylaxis"
2018–2019	Law & Order: Special Victims Unit	Fitz	5 episodes
2020	Umbrella Academy	Keechie	6 episodes
2021	Titans	Gizmo	Episode: "Barbara Gordon"
2023	Transplant	Percy Campbell	3 episodes:
