= Paul Ahmarani =

Canadian actor

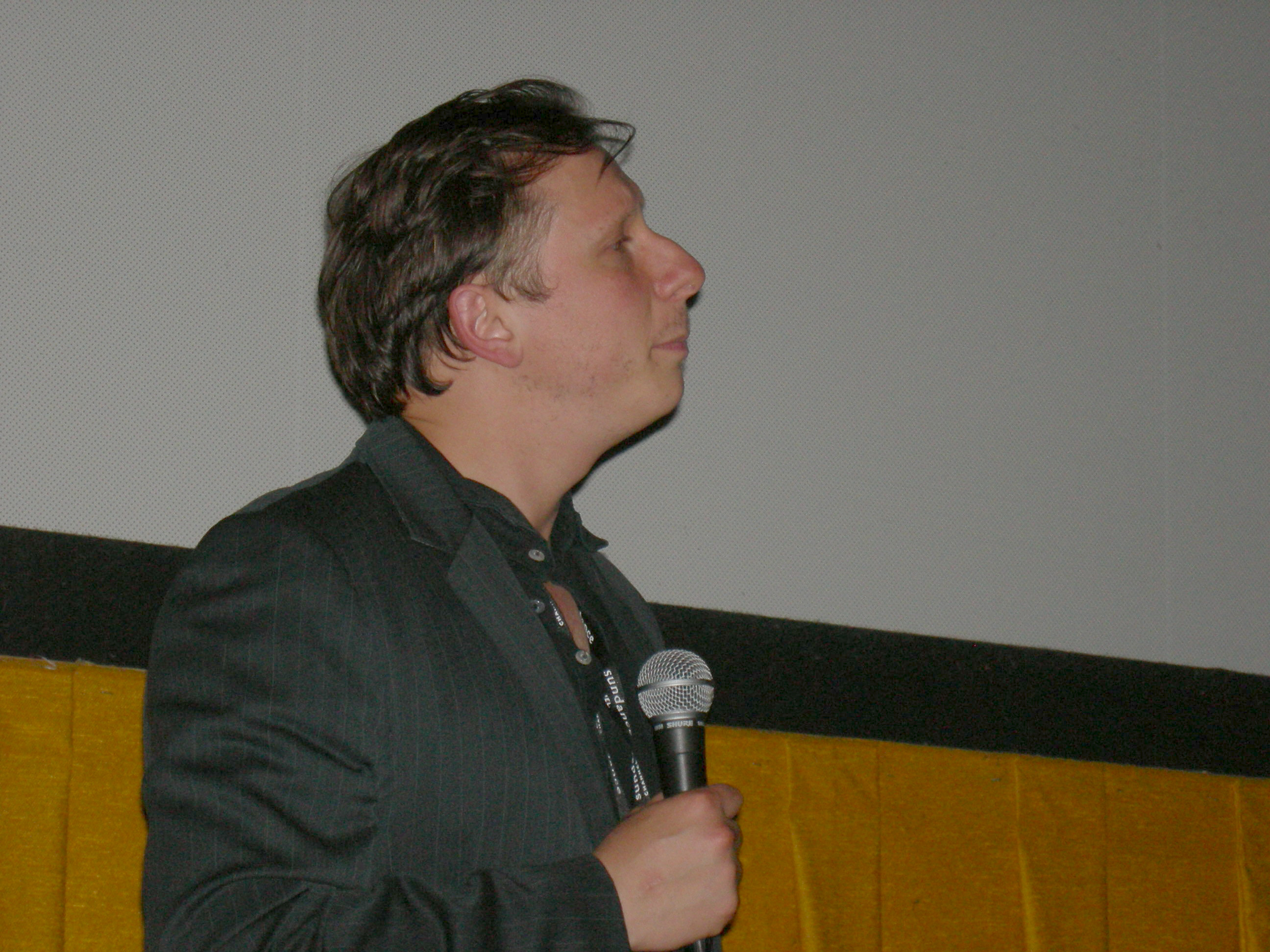
- Ahmarani (2007)
- Born: Paul-Alexandre Ahmarani; 1972 (age 53–54); Quebec, Canada
- Occupation: Actor

Paul Ahmarani (born 1972) is a Canadian actor. Ahmarani is known for his roles in the movies The Left-Hand Side of the Fridge (La Moitié gauche du frigo) and How My Mother Gave Birth to Me During Menopause (Comment ma mère accoucha de moi durant sa ménopause). He has also appeared in the first season of the television Star Trek parody Dans une galaxie près de chez vous. In 2005 he released a musical album called "Portrait vivant" under the name "Paul Ahmarani et les nouveaux mariés" ("Paul Ahmarani and the Newlyweds", see the External links section to listen).

In 2012, audiences saw him in Martin Villeneuve's Mars et Avril, a science fiction film based on the graphic novels of the same name.

== Personal life ==
Outside his acting and singing career, Paul Ahmarani has also been a supporter of Quebec's left-wing party, Québec solidaire. On 25 February 2010, Paul Ahmarani, together with 500 artists, joined the call to support the international campaign for Boycott, Divestment, and Sanctions against the Israeli Apartheid.

== Filmography ==
=== Cinema ===
- The Last Breath (Le Dernier souffle), 1999 — Max
- Rats and Rabbits (2000) — Petru
- The List (2000) — Vinnie Gomez
- The Left-Hand Side of the Fridge (La Moitié gauche du frigo), 2000 — Christophe
- Waterfront Dreams (Au fil de l'eau), 2002 — Michel
- The Marsh (Le Marais), 2002 — Ulysse
- Guys, Girls and a Jerk (Des gars, des filles et un salaud), 2003 — Eric
- How My Mother Gave Birth to Me During Menopause (Comment ma mère accoucha de moi durant sa ménopause), 2003 — Jean-Charles
- Life with My Father (La Vie avec mon père), 2005 — Paul Agira
- Congorama, 2006 — Louis Legros
- Adam's Wall, 2008 — Najeeb Gibran
- A Sentimental Capitalism (Un capitalisme sentimental), 2008 — Max
- Le Banquet, 2008 — director
- Truffles (Truffe), 2008
- Vampires, 2010 — Adelard
- The Future Is Now!, 2011 — The Man of Today
- Mars and April (Mars et Avril), 2012 — Arthur
- The Cyclotron (Le Cyclotron), 2016 — König
- Family First (Chien de garde), 2018
- Les Salopes, or the Naturally Wanton Pleasure of Skin, 2018
- Genesis (Genèse), 2018
- Ville Neuve, 2018
- Arlette, 2022
- Who by Fire (Comme le feu), 2024
- Hotel Silence (Hôtel Silence), 2024
- We'll Find Happiness (On sera heureux), 2025
- Lovely Day (Mille secrets mille dangers), 2025

=== Television ===
- Dans une galaxie près de chez vous (1999) .... Falbo Gotta
- Quadra (2000) .... Roch
- Tag (2000) .... Wiper
- Bunker, le cirque (2002) .... Patrick Sénécal
- Fortier (2003) .... Jacynthe / Raoul
- Marie-Antoinette (TV movie, 2006) .... Léonard
- La Job (2006) .... Sam Bisaillon
- Trauma (2011) .... Steve McGinnis
- Unité 9 2015-16 ... Francois Beaudry
- Classé secret (2022-) ...Jacques Thomassin

== Discography ==
- Portrait vivant (2005)

== See also ==
- List of Quebec actors
- List of Quebec musicians
- Cinema of Quebec
- Culture of Quebec
