= The Ring Within =

2002 Canadian documentary film

- French: Le Ring intérieur
- Directed by: Dan Bigras
- Written by: Dan Bigras
- Produced by: Éric Michel
- Narrated by: Dan Bigras
- Cinematography: Michel La Veaux
- Edited by: Hélène Girard
- Music by: Dan Bigras
- Production company: National Film Board of Canada
- Release date: 2002
- Running time: 75 minutes
- Country: Canada
- Language: French

The Ring Within (French: Le Ring intérieur) is a Canadian documentary film, directed by Dan Bigras and released in 2002. The film centres on the then-emerging sport of mixed martial arts.

The film was a Genie Award nominee for Best Feature Length Documentary at the 23rd Genie Awards in 2003.
