= Martin Deschamps =

Canadian rock singer (born 1970)

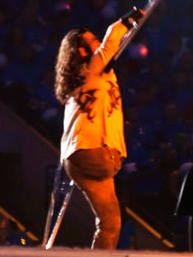
- Deschamps performing in 2010

Background information
- Born: 23 June 1970 (age 56); Montreal, Quebec, Canada
- Genres: Rock
- Instruments: Vocals; bass; drums
- Years active: 1996–present
- Website: martindeschamps.com

Martin Deschamps (born 23 June 1970) is a Canadian rock singer from Quebec. He records and performs both as a solo artist and as the lead vocalist for the reunited Offenbach.

== Young age ==
Deschamps was born with congenital deformities of all four limbs; he is missing both his left arm and right leg, and has only two fingers on his right hand.

At the age of nine, his family moved to Rawdon, Quebec. During his youth, his handicap was not mocked in school. He entertained his student friends in class and maintained good enough grades to be the first of his class.

He started playing the drums when he reached 11 years of age, and by the age of 15, he was playing bass guitar and started singing. From 1989 to 1995 he was a graphic designer for Bell company. The first band he played in was called Any Way, as their drummer. Knowing he wanted to become a band leader, he formed his own group called Deep Freeze.

== Career ==
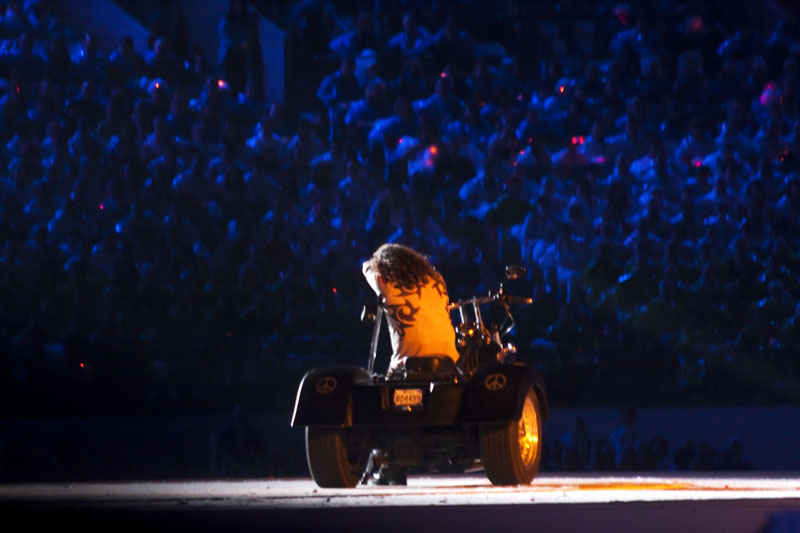
Martin Deschamps performing at the Opening ceremony for the 2010 Paralympics.

His musical career began in 1996, with that group. He was named best vocalist in the L'Empire des futures stars competition. He was subsequently invited to join rock band Offenbach on a reunion tour as the replacement for the late Gerry Boulet, and immediately departed on a 50-show tour. Then he released his own solo debut, Comme je suis, in 2000. Selling 60,000 copies in Quebec, the album spawned three hit singles and was nominated for three Félix Awards, for best new artist, best rock album and best single ("Quand").

For his second album, 2001's Différent, he donated a portion of the profits to Montreal's Centre hospitalier universitaire Sainte-Justine, and subsequently became a spokesperson for the province's Semaine des personnes handicapées.

He subsequently recorded two songs for the soundtrack to Denise Filiatrault's film Alice's Odyssey (L'Odyssée d'Alice Tremblay) and a duet with Lynda Lemay, and mounted a successful concert tour in France.

His third album, Le Désert, was released in 2003. That album's single "Vérité" spent five weeks at #1 on Quebec's pop charts.

Offenbach subsequently released the album Nature in 2005, and Deschamps toured with the band that year.

He performed during the 2010 Winter Paralympics opening ceremony.

He performed at the state funeral for Jack Layton, deceased leader of the New Democratic Party, on 27 August 2011.

He released a Christmas CD in December 2012. It features his daughter.

In an interview with fellow disabled person Elizabeth, he cites Metallica, AC/DC and PATOFFE as his greatest musical inspirations.

Martin Deschamps performed in 2004 for the anti-smoking group Commando Oxygene at la TOHU. He sang a cover of "I feel good" by James Brown. He began the performance by discussing his history of smoking, and after declaring that he was now a non-smoker he said "Boy, do I feel good" and danced on stage.

He owns a custom made Harley Davidson, which has been built so that he can ride it without arms and legs.
