= Krista Sutton =

Canadian actress

- Born: March 29, 1970 (age 55); Pointe-Claire, Quebec

Krista Sutton (born March 29, 1970) is a Canadian actress, best known for her leading role in the improvisational drama series Train 48.

== Early life and education ==
Born in Pointe-Claire, Quebec, she grew up in Toronto, Ontario, and was educated at Havergal College and the University of Toronto.

== Career ==
She was co-founder and Artistic Director of the Georgian Theatre Festival in Meaford, Ontario, where Krista has also been an actor and director.

She had her first prominent role in the 2000 film American Psycho as Sabrina, a sex worker who was at the centre of the scene that controversially led to the film getting an NC-17 rating. In 2003, she received a Dora Mavor Moore Award nomination for Outstanding Actress, Independent Theatre, for her performance in This Could Be Love.

Since then she has appeared in many film, TV and film roles including roles in West Wing, The Associates, The Newsroom, Coast to Coast, The Vagina Monologues (original Canadian Cast) and in a recurring role on The Pradeeps of Pittsburgh.

She was cowriter with Penelope Buitenhuis of the 2009 film A Wake, in which she also played one of the main roles.

== Brief filmography ==
- American Psycho (2000) - Sabrina
- The Associates (2001) - Shauna Bellman
- Life with Judy Garland: Me and My Shadows (2001) - Lorna Luft
- Train 48 (2003-2005) - Liz Irwin-Gallo
- Public Domain (2003) - Anchor
- Welcome to Mooseport (2004) - Live Newscaster
- 6teen (2004) - Courtney Masterson
- Stir of Echoes: The Homecoming (2007) - Tessa
- Jack and Jill vs. the World (2008) - Emily
- A Wake (2009) - Maya
