= A Wake (film) =

2009 Canadian drama film

- Film poster
- Directed by: Penelope Buitenhuis
- Written by: Penelope Buitenhuis; Krista Sutton
- Produced by: Paul Scherzer
- Starring: Tara Nicodemo; Graham Abbey; Krista Sutton
- Cinematography: François Dagenais
- Edited by: James Bredin
- Music by: Aaron Davis
- Production companies: Breakthrough Entertainment; Penelope Films; Six Island Productions
- Distributed by: Domino Film and Television
- Release date: September 20, 2009 (AIFF)
- Running time: 94 minutes
- Country: Canada
- Language: English

A Wake is a Canadian drama film, directed by Penelope Buitenhuis and released in 2009.

The film centres on a group of actors who are convening for a wake following the death of Gabor Zazlov (Nicholas Campbell), who had been their director in a production of Hamlet that collapsed several years earlier; the gathering, requested by Gabor shortly before his death, is in fact a ploy to restore his damaged reputation by forcing the cast to stage a filmed reading of the play, in the hopes that their petty dramas and recriminations will ultimately reveal the real reasons why the production failed.

== Cast ==
- Nicholas Campbell as Gabor Zazlov
- Tara Nicodemo as Hanna Zazlov, Gabor's Widow.
- Graham Abbey as Tyler, who had been cast as Prince Hamlet in the original production and has since gone on to become a character actor in Hollywood.
- Krista Sutton as Maya, who was the Ophelia and has since left acting to become a mother and teacher.
- Sarain Boylan as Danielle, a provocatively dressed and cocaine-addicted actress who claims that Gabor raped her.
- Raoul Bhaneja as Raj, a closeted gay actor whose jealousy at being passed over for the role of Hamlet led him to approach the press with the allegations that derailed the production.
- Martha Burns as Sabina, the philanthropist who had funded the production.
- Kristopher Turner as Chad, Gabor and Hanna's son who arrives home from a trip to Europe during the event without knowing that his father has died.
- Paul Braunstein as The Neighbour
- Florence Walker as The Nurse

== Production ==
The film was written by Sutton and Buitenhuis, inspired in part by the death of Sutton's father. The introduction of Hamlet as a defining motif was introduced later. They wrote a broad story outline, but allowed the actors to improvise much of their dialogue after working with them to establish the characters' backstories.

The film was shot in Cambridge, Ontario, in early 2009.

== Distribution ==
The film premiered at the 2009 Atlantic International Film Festival, before going into commercial release in 2011.

== Critical response ==
Linda Barnard of the Toronto Star called the film uneven, but wrote that "Buitenhuis deserves praise for a brave and unconventional approach to making A Wake. Its experimental feel is tempered by solid camerawork — the stark winter landscape adds the right note of melancholy. And the story contains a satisfying twist that goes a long way to redeem some of the rough edges and to remind us that dead men do indeed tell tales. Whether or not we should believe them is the tricky part."

Jennie Punter of The Globe and Mail wrote that the cast "stay on topic and offer some nice moments of character revelation, but something is missing: an understanding, on an emotional level, of why Gabor still has such a hold on them. We are told many things, but it's not the same as feeling them. And Hanna's awkward insistence on videotaping the gathering is not only a distracting, useless device but also telegraphs too clearly where the story is headed."

Susan G. Cole of Now negatively reviewed the film, writing that "the situation and the dialogue – invented by the cast itself – are so ludicrous that they make even the brilliant Graham Abbey, as the only actor among them who made it to L.A., a bore. And what’s with Raj (Raoul Bhaneja), the closeted actor? Afraid to be gay? In the theatre world? You can’t be serious. Unfortunately, A Wake is."

== Awards ==
The film won the award for best film at the 2010 Carmel Film Festival, and at the 2010 Female Eye Film Festival.

It was shortlisted for the DGC Award for Best Direction in a Feature Film at the 2010 Directors Guild of Canada awards.
