= Raoul Bhaneja =

Canadian actor and musician

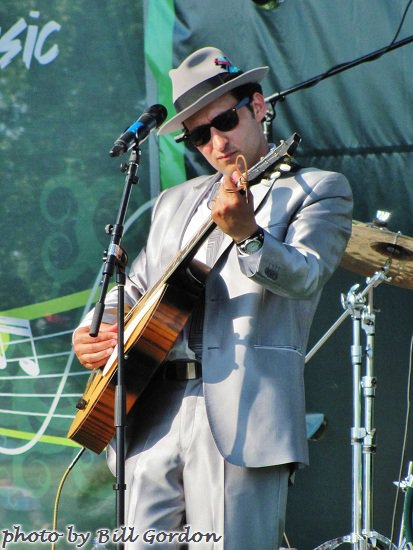
- Bhaneja in 2011
- Born: Manchester, England
- Education: Canterbury High School (Ottawa); National Theatre School of Canada; British American Drama Academy
- Occupations: Actor; musician; producer; broadcaster
- Years active: 1996–present
- Website: www.raoulbhaneja.com

Raoul Bhaneja is an English-Canadian actor, musician, writer and producer.

== Early life and studies ==
Bhaneja was born in Manchester. His father is an Indian Sindhi, and his mother is Irish. He is a graduate of The National Theatre School of Canada and Ottawa's Canterbury High School's Arts Canterbury programme for drama.

== Career ==
Raoul Bhaneja has appeared in more than a hundred and fifty film and television projects in addition to a long list of theatre productions and is also a four time Canadian Screen Award nominee.

His first job in television was in the first season of the 1996 cutting edge comedy The Newsroom, directed by Ken Finkleman for CBC. He was one of the stars of the television series Train 48, which produced over 300 episodes in two years and was broadcast on Global.

Bhaneja's first starring role in a feature film was with Andy Jones and Mary Walsh in Extraordinary Visitor in 1998. Directed by John Doyle, it debuted at The Toronto International Film Festival. Other features include Atom Egoyan's Ararat, The Sentinel opposite Michael Douglas, Godsend with Rebecca Romijn, Touch of Pink with Jimi Mistry and Kyle MacLachlan, Weirdsville with Wes Bentley, the romantic comedy The Right Kind of Wrong, the U.S. independent film As Good As You, Portrait of a Serial Monogamist, Ice Soldiers, Miss Sloane, opposite Jessica Chastain, HBO Films Fahrenheit 451 and the 2020 Sundance breakout Possessor opposite Christopher Abbot.

His television roles include series regular Medhi on The Trades (TV series) and recurring roles such as the crooked Southern lawyer Richard Shirley on Blindspot (NBC), Titans (Netflix), Departure (Peacock/GlobalTV), The Dresden Files (SyFy), Pure (WGN), Rogue (Direct), The Best Laid Plans, Crawford, Sunshine Sketches, At The Hotel (CBC) with guest-star appearances on Grey's Anatomy (ABC), Hudson and Rex (CITY), V-Wars (Syfy), Rookie Blue (Global & ABC), Remedy (Global), Motive (CTV), Beauty and The Beast, Nikita (The CW), Bitten, Alphas (Syfy), Warehouse 13 (Syfy), Frankie Drake, The Ron James Show, The Republic of Doyle, Murdoch Mysteries (CBC), Private Eyes, Saving Hope (CTV), The Listener (CTV), Flashpoint (CTV), The Art of More (Sony Crackle), Suits (USA) and many others.

Bhaneja narrated the 2020 novel, Afterlife Crisis, by Randal Graham.

In January 2006 Bhaneja debuted in Hamlet (solo), a one-man version of Shakespeare's Hamlet directed by Robert Ross Parker, which has been performed across Canada including an engagement at The National Arts Centre in the fall of 2013, in the United Kingdom at The Assembly Rooms as part of the Edinburgh Festival Fringe and The Royal Academy of Dramatic Art as well as in New York City on a number of occasions, including Off Broadway. The production is the subject of a documentary, directed by Jeff Stephenson, that was later nominated for the 2008 Gemini Award.

His stage musical Life, Death and The Blues, produced in association with Theatre Passe Muraille in Toronto, toured across Canada for more than a hundred performances and played to more than 20,000 patrons. Described as a "theatre/concert hybrid," the Dora Mavor Moore Award and Betty Mitchell Award production featured a live band on stage and Raoul Bhaneja's co-star, Juno-Award-winner Divine Brown. That successful production was followed by the hit play Disgraced by Ayad Akhtar, co-produced with Mirvish Productions, which smashed box-office records in two separate runs in Toronto at the Panasonic Theatre as well as at the Citadel Theatre in Edmonton. Bhaneja was joined on stage by his wife Birgitte Solem. He later produced the Canadian premiere of Vietgone by Qui Nguyen at the Royal Manitoba Theatre Centre in Winnipeg.

Since 2026, Bhaneja has had a recurring role in Star Trek: Star Fleet Academy as Chancellor Kelrec, head of the Star Fleet's War College.

== Music ==
Bhaneja is also the front man of the Maple Blues Award-winning blues band Raoul and The Big Time, formed in 1998. They have released Big Time Blues (2000), Cold Outside (2004), You My People (2009), Blue Midnight: A Live Tribute Little Walter (2010) through Big Time Records and Maple Blues Award nominated Hollywood Blvd (2014) recorded with members of Canned Heat and The Mavis Staples Band among others. In late 2019 he released "A Good Thing" the debut album from Blue Standard, a jazz duo formed with pianist Jesse Whiteley. Bhaneja is also a member of the band The Legendary Miles Johnson with Edmonton-based musician Graham Guest and has appeared as a guest artist on a number of recordings. In 2020 he began hosting "Raoul's Blues" a two-hour blues music and interview broadcast on Jazzcast a 24-hour streaming station.

== Filmography ==
- Twitch City (1998; TV series) as Fred (recurring)
- Extraordinary Visitor (1999)
- Violet (2000)
- Braceface (2001; TV series; voice) as Mark "Dion" Jones (recurring)
- The Endless Grind (2001)
- Medabots (2001; TV series; voice) as Baton
- Ararat (2002)
- Beyblade (2002–05; TV series; voice)
- Cold Creek Manor (2003)
- Train 48 (2003–05; TV series) as Peter (Pete) Subramani (main cast)
- Weirdsville (2006)
- The Sentinel (2006)
- The Dresden Files (2007)
- A Wake (2009)
- The Right Kind of Wrong (2013)
- The Best Laid Plans (2014)
- Portrait of a Serial Monogamist (2015)
- Miss Sloane (2016)
- Possessor (2020)
- Elinor Wonders Why (2020–; TV series; voice) as Mr. Bat
- Clarice (2021)
- Langdon (2021)
- Lamya's Poem (2021)
- Paw Patrol: The Movie (2021)
- Open Season: Call of Nature (2023–24; TV series; voice) as RJ
- The Trades (2024, TV series) as Medhi (main cast)
- Star Trek: Starfleet Academy (2026–; TV series) as Chancellor Kelrec (recurring)
- Signal One (2026) as Agent Sparrow
