= Blind Spot (2009 film) =

2009 Canadian film

- Film poster
- French: Lucidité passagère
- Directed by: Fabrice Barrilliet; Nicolas Bolduc; Julien Knafo; Marie-Hélène Panisset
- Written by: Martin Thibaudeau; George Spiridakis
- Produced by: Fabrice Barrilliet; Marie-Hélène Panisset
- Starring: Daniel Parent; Hélène Florent; Erik Duhamel
- Cinematography: Nicolas Bolduc
- Edited by: Carina Baccanale
- Music by: Julien Knafo
- Production company: Verbomatrices
- Distributed by: Axia Films
- Release date: October 12, 2009 (FIFF)
- Running time: 82 minutes
- Country: Canada
- Language: French

Blind Spot (French: Lucidité passagère) is a 2009 Canadian drama film. A collective film directed by Fabrice Barrilliet, Nicolas Bolduc, Julien Knafo and Marie-Hélène Panisset, it centres on a group of friends who are undergoing personal crises as they enter their 30s.

The film's cast includes Daniel Parent, Hélène Florent, Erik Duhamel, Mario Saint-Amand, Maxim Roy, Sylvain Bissonnette, Judith Baribeau, Pierre-Olivier Fortier, Jean-René Ouellet, Karolyne Barrilliet, Vassili Schneider, Leanne Hebert-Nguyen, Vanessa Brown, Dominique Desrochers, Marianne Farley, Dominic Leblanc and Brigitte Paquette.

The film premiered at the Festival International du Film Francophone de Namur in October 2009, before going into theatrical release in 2010.

Knafo received a Jutra Award nomination for Best Original Music at the 13th Jutra Awards in 2011.

== Cast ==
- Daniel Parent as Rémi
- Hélène Florent as Véronique
- Erik Duhamel as Fred
- Mario Saint-Amand as Mathieu
- Maxim Roy as Maggie
- Sylvain G. Bissonnette as Antoine(as Sylvain Bissonnette)
- Judith Baribeau as Émilie
