= Sébastien Rose =

Canadian film director and screenwriter (born 1969)

Sébastien Rose (born June 30, 1969, in Montreal, Quebec) is a Canadian film director and screenwriter. His debut film, How My Mother Gave Birth to Me During Menopause (Comment ma mère accoucha de moi durant sa ménopause), won the Claude Jutra Award for the best Canadian film by a first-time director in 2003.

== Filmography ==
- How My Mother Gave Birth to Me During Menopause (Comment ma mère accoucha de moi durant sa ménopause) — 2003
- Life with My Father (La Vie avec mon père) — 2005
- Le Banquet — 2008
- Before My Heart Falls (Avant que mon cœur bascule) — 2012
