= Alessia Patuelli =

Italian cyclist

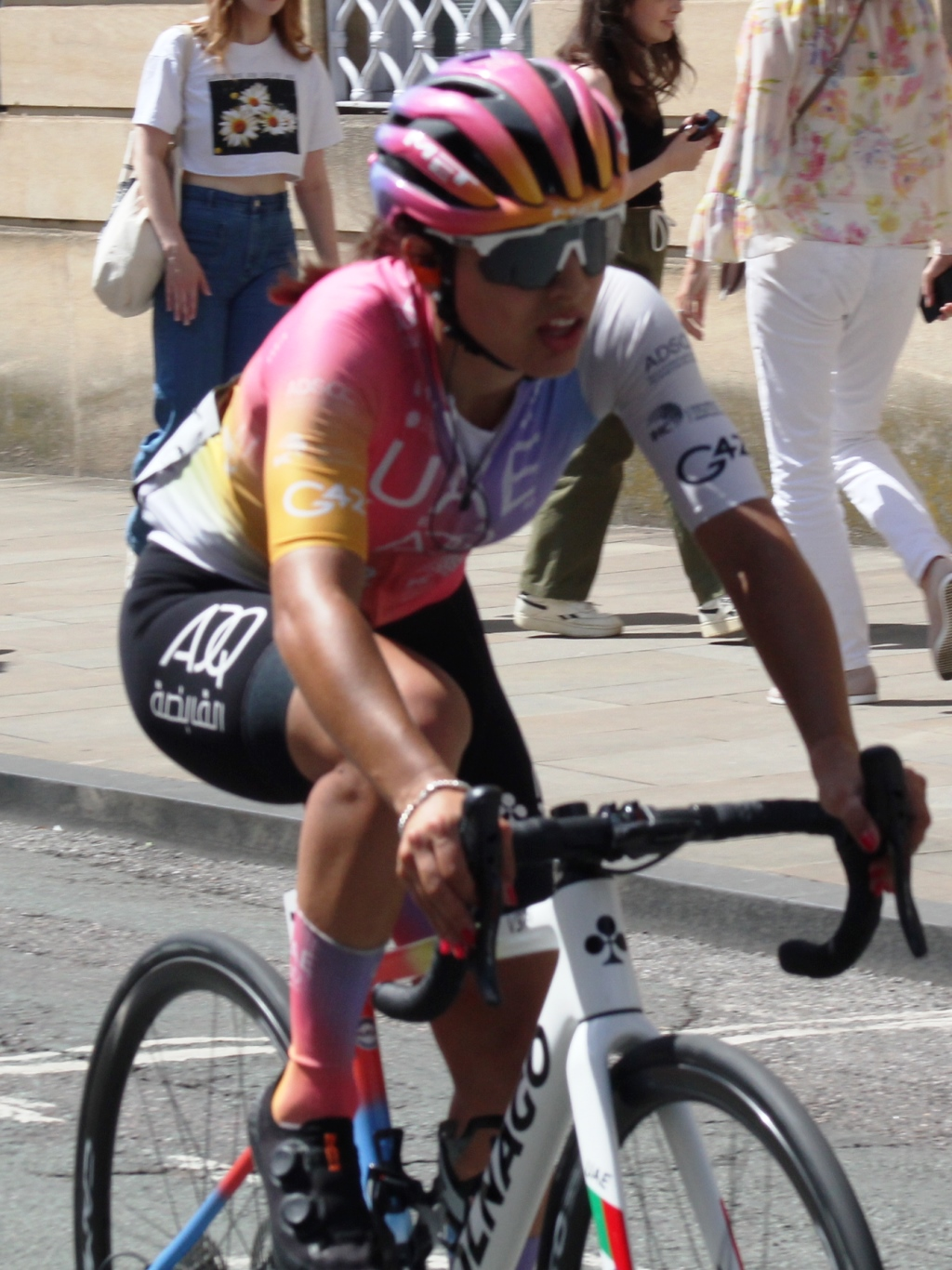
- Alessia Patuelli in 2022

Personal information
- Born: 22 December 2002 (age 23)

Cycling career
- Sport: Cycling
- Current team: BTC City Ljubljana Zhiraf Ambedo
- Discipline: Road
- Role: Rider

Professional teams
- 2021–2021: Alé BTC Ljubljana
- 2022–2022: UAE Team Emirates
- 2023–2023: Bepink
- 2024–: BTC City Ljubljana Zhiraf Ambedo

Alessia Patuelli (born 22 December 2002) is an Italian professional racing cyclist, who currently rides for UCI Women's WorldTeam BTC City Ljubljana Zhiraf Ambedo.
