= Offenbach (band) =

Canadian blues rock band

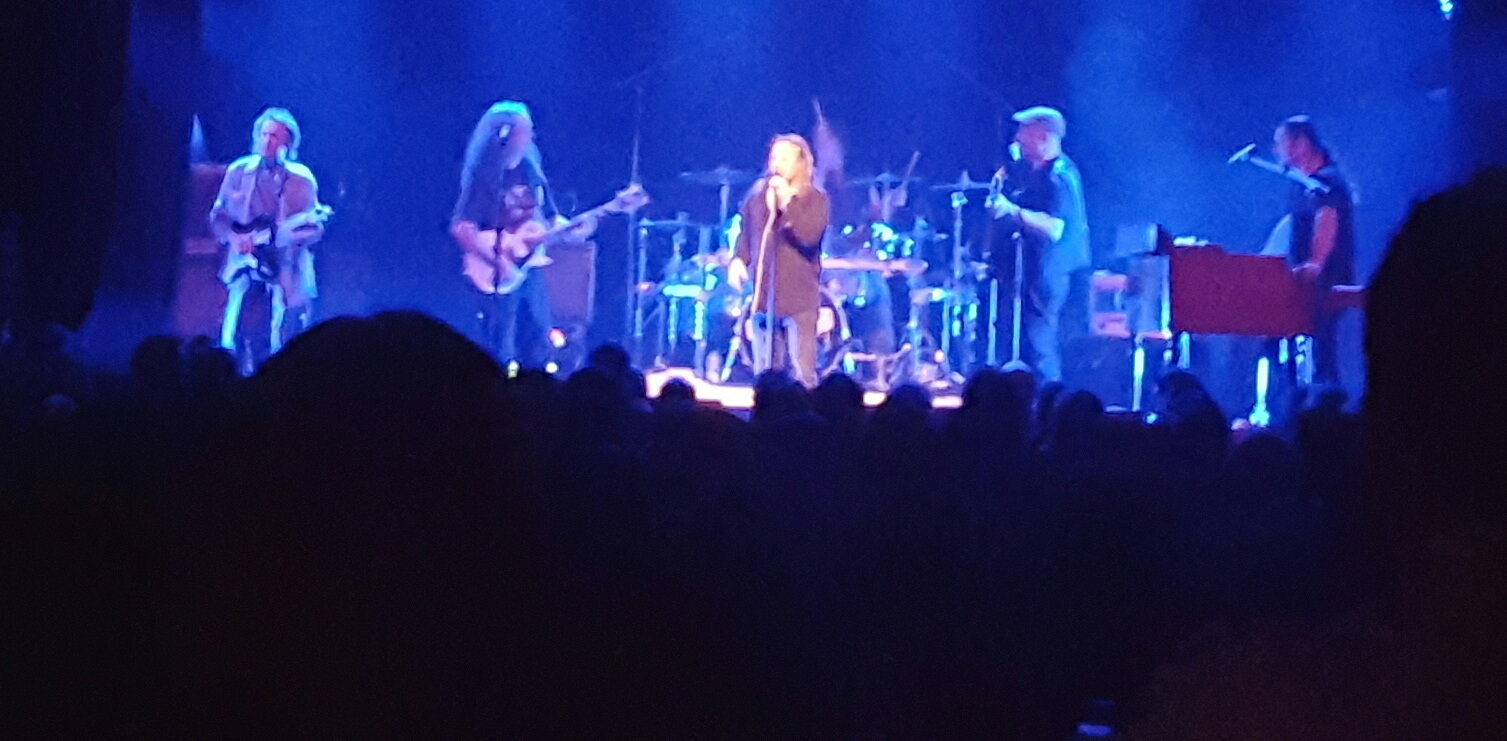
- Offenbach concert in 2017

Background information
- Also known as: Les Gants blancs
- Origin: Montreal, Quebec, Canada
- Genres: Blues rock, Progressive rock
- Years active: 1966–1985; 1996–present
- Members: Johnny Gravel; Ghyslain Robidas; Michel Landry; Domenic Romanelli; Eric Sauvé
- Past members: John McGale (died 2022); Pierre Harel; Gerry Boulet (died 1990); Michel Lamothe; Denis Boulet; Roger Belval; Breen LeBoeuf; Pat Martel; Robert Harrisson; Dan Bigras; George Papafilys
- Website: https://offenbachrocks.com/

Offenbach is a Canadian progressive rock and blues rock band, initially active from 1969 to 1985. Following a successful reunion tour in 1996, the band released a new album in 2005.

== History ==
Formed in Montreal in the mid 1960s as Les Gants blancs, the band went through a variety of names (including "7e Invention", "Grandpa & Company", "Offenbach Pop Opera", and "Offenbach Soap Opéra") before settling on Offenbach in 1969. The band initially consisted of vocalist and lyricist Pierre Harel, guitarist Johnny Gravel, organist and singer Gerry Boulet, bassist Michel Lamothe (son of country singer Willie Lamothe), and drummer Denis Boulet (Gerry's brother).

Offenbach Soap Opera released their debut self-titled album, Offenbach Soap Opéra, in 1971. Although the band's material was primarily in French, that album also included two English songs, "No Money No Candy" and "High But Low".

Denis Boulet left the band in 1972, and was replaced by Roger (Wezo) Belval. In November of that year, the band performed a "Mass for the Dead" at Saint Joseph's Oratory, which was released on album as Saint-Chrone de néant.

In 1973, Pierre Harel left the band to pursue a career as a filmmaker and the band toured France. They were based there for the next two years as they toured Europe extensively. Several performances from this era were documented in the concert film Tabarnak, directed by Claude Faraldo. In 1975, the band returned to Montreal.

Lamothe and Belval left in 1977 and were replaced by Norman Kerr on bass and Pierre Lavoie on drums; Jean Millaire also joined the band that year as a second guitarist, but left within the year and was replaced briefly by Doug McCaskill, then permanently by John McGale. Kerr and Lavoie departed in 1978, and were replaced by Breen Leboeuf on bass and Robert Harrisson on drums.

In 1976, the band recorded its first of two English albums, Never Too Tender, and toured across Canada to promote it. They subsequently released three more French albums, Offenbach, Traversion and "En Fusion", before their second English language album, Rock Bottom, was released in 1980. Traversion won the band its first Félix Award for rock album of the year in 1979.

In 1979, Offenbach toured Quebec with the Vic Vogel Big Band. A recording of their concert at the St. Denis Theatre was issued in 1980 as Offenbach en fusion, which won the Félix Award for rock album of the year in 1980. The band also received Félix Awards in 1980 as group of the year and for show of the year, the latter honoring a concert on April 3 in which Offenbach became the first Québécois band ever to headline at the Montreal Forum.

In 1982, Harrison left the band and was replaced by Pat Martel. The band released three more albums of new material, as well as the live album À fond d'train (documenting a successful tour with Plume Latraverse), Gerry Boulet recorded his first solo album in 1985 and started planning a solo career. The band performed final shows at the Colisée de Québec and the Montreal Forum that year; the Montreal concert was released on album as Le Dernier show and as a concert film.

== Post-breakup ==
The musicians involved in Offenbach each pursued solo projects through the next decade. Boulet released two solo albums before his death in 1990. Leboeuf and McGale released a project together as Buzz Band; Leboeuf subsequently released several albums as a solo artist, after taking part in the successful promotional tournée of Céline Dion's Incognito album (1987–1988). McGale released one solo album, entitled Bridges, as well as collaborations with Dan Bigras, Julie Masse, Isabelle Boulay, and Toyo. Harel, Lamothe and Belval formed the new band Corbach to capitalize on the history and popularity of both Offenbach and Corbeau. Gravel formed the band Patriotes, and Martel played with pop singer Carole Ann King.

In 1992, the band's back catalogue began to be remastered and rereleased on compact disc, and several of their albums once again hit Quebec's pop charts in the new format.

== Reunion ==
In 1996, McGale, Gravel and Leboeuf reunited as Offenbach Inc. for a reunion tour. Due to Boulet's death, they selected Martin Deschamps, who had recently won Quebec's L'Empire des futures stars competition, as the band's new vocalist. They toured extensively for two years, and released a greatest hits compilation in 1999. A second volume of hits followed in 2002.

In 2005, the band released Nature, which consisted of acoustic versions of their classic hits. It also includes one new song "L'amour est cruel" (Love is cruel). The music was written by Gravel in the 1980s and the words were later added by Deschamps. A concert at Montreal's Bell Center on April 1, 2005, marked the 25th anniversary of Offenbach's first Forum show.

In January 2007, Leboeuf was announced as the new bassist for April Wine, replacing the departed Jim Clench.

As of 2012, the band is still touring and performing shows all over Quebec as well as in Ontario, New Brunswick and France.

The band's current line up consists of:

- ~~John McGale: Vocals, Guitar, Saxophone and Flute~~ McGale died in a car crash near the Quebec-New York border early on the morning of Sunday, October 31, 2022—his 66th birthday.
- Johnny Gravel: Guitar
- Ghyslain Robidas: Lead Vocals
- Michel Landry: Vocals and Drums
- Domenic Romanelli: Bass
- Eric Sauvé: Hammond B3 Organ and Piano

In 2018, Offenbach released Renaissance the first disc of new material in 33 years.

== Discography ==
- Offenbach Soap Opéra (1972)
- St-Chrone de néant (1973)
- Bulldozer (Original Motion Picture Soundtrack) (1973)
- Tabarnac (1975, live)
- Never Too Tender (1976)
- Offenbach (1977)
- Traversion (1979)
- Rock Bottom (1980)
- Offenbach en fusion (1980, live)
- Coup de foudre (1981)
- Tonnedebrick (1983)
- Live à fond d'train (1984, live)
- Rockorama (1985)
- Le Dernier Show (1986)
- Offenbach 1990 (re-issue)
- Offenbach 2-4-6 Box Set (1992)
- Offenbach 1-3-5 Box Set (1992)
- Les 20 plus grands succès (1999)
- Les 20 plus grands succès, volume 2 (2002)
- Nature (2005)
- l'Ultime (2007)
- Montreux (2014, live)
- Bacon (2016, live)
- Renaissance (2018)
