= Hélène Florent =

Canadian actress

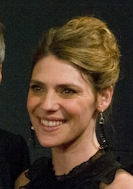
- Florent at the 2012 Genie Awards
- Citizenship: Canadian
- Occupation: Actress

Hélène Florent is a Canadian film and television actress. Her roles have included the television series Les Invincibles, Toute la vérité, La galère, and the 2000s revival of Lance et compte, as well as the films Yellowknife, Familia, Life with My Father (La Vie avec mon père) and Café de Flore. She garnered a Genie Award nomination for Best Supporting Actress at the 32nd Genie Awards for her performance in Café de Flore. That film also got her nominated for a Satellite Award for Best Supporting Actress in 2012.

At the 24th Quebec Cinema Awards in 2022 she won both Best Actress for Drunken Birds (Les Oiseaux ivres) and Best Supporting Actress for Maria Chapdelaine, becoming the first actress in the history of the awards to win both categories in the same year.

At the 25th Quebec Cinema Awards in 2023, she received a Best Actress nomination for A Respectable Woman (Une femme respectable).

== Selected filmography ==
- Blind Spot (Lucidité passagère) - 2009
- Sarah Prefers to Run (Sarah préfère la course) - 2013
- Maria Chapdelaine - 2021
- Drunken Birds (Les Oiseaux ivres) - 2021
- A Respectable Woman (Une femme respectable) - 2023
