= Paul Braunstein =

Canadian actor

Paul Braunstein is a Canadian actor who starred in the popular Canadian television series Train 48 in 2003 as Johnny McLaughlin, a comical character. He was considered one of the most popular cast members of the series and has also made a few other appearances on television and film. He appeared as Griggs in the 2011 horror film The Thing as well as the 2017 horror film Jigsaw. Braunstein also acted in theatre productions.

He co-starred in the 2023 workplace comedy series Shelved on CTV.

== Filmography ==
=== Film ===
Year	Title	Role	Notes
2002	Rub & Tug	Eastern European client	
2002	The Tuxedo	Sewer CSA Op	
2003	The Gospel of John	Man in Temple Crowd #4	
2009	A Wake	Neighbor	
2011	Jesus Henry Christ	Dr. Gunther Flowers	
2011	The Thing	Griggs	
2012	Eddie: The Sleepwalking Cannibal	Verner	
2012	A Man's World	Dave	
2017	Undercover Grandpa	General Komenkho	
2017	Jigsaw	Ryan	
2019	American Hangman	Ron	
2019	Shazam!	Officer	
2019	Heavy	Detective	
2020	Toys of Terror	Toy	
2021	The Exchange	Glenn	
2021	Paw Patrol: The Movie	Additional voices	
2024	Fight Another Day	Colt	

=== Television ===
Year	Title	Role	Notes
1999	Earth: Final Conflict	Tech	Episode: "Déjà Vu"
1999	What Katy Did	Telegraph Operator	Television film
2001	Exhibit A: Secrets of Forensic Science	Ronald Dalton	Episode: "Away"
2002	The 5th Quadrant	Henry Beamish	Episode: "Dream Soda/Time Traveller's Checks"
2003–2005	Train 48	Johnny McLaughlin	273 episodes
2007–2008	History Bites	Various roles	4 episodes
2008	Air Crash Investigation	Various roles	2 episodes
2010	Rookie Blue	John Doe	Episode: "Big Nickel"
2011	Wingin' It	Count Salazar	Episode: "Hands Solo"
2011	Nikita	Anton Kochenko	Episode: "Knightfall"
2012	Less Than Kind	Coach	3 episode
2012	King	Geoffrey Carson	Episode: "Alicia Pratta"
2012	The L.A. Complex	Director	Episode: "Stay"
2012	Flashpoint	Andy	Episode: "We Take Care of Our Own"
2012	Heartland	Robert	Episode: "Do the Right Thing"
2012, 2015	Saving Hope	Bill Helperin / John Doe	2 episodes
2012–2020	Murdoch Mysteries	Raymond Huckabee / Arlen Pike	4 episodes
2013	Suits	Security Guard	2 episodes
2013	The Listener	Armoured Van Guard	Episode: "The Blue Line"
2014	Working the Engels	Mitchell	Episode: "Jenna's Presentation"
2014	Reign	Scottish Footman	Episode: "No Exit"
2014	Fargo	Lenny	Episode: "The Rooster Prince"
2014	Haven	Mitchell	3 episodes
2015	Rick Mercer Report	Rogers Tech	Episode #12.14
2015	The Lizzie Borden Chronicles	Stepfather	Episode: "The Sister's Grimke"
2016	Mayday	First Officer Keele	Episode: "Southern Storm"
2016–2021	Baroness von Sketch Show	Various roles	11 episodes
2017	Save Me	Bystander	Episode: "Hypovolemia"
2017	Inspector Gadget	MAD Henchman	Episode: "MAD Money/Baking Bad"
2017	Black Mirror	Anthony	Episode: "Arkangel"
2017–2019	Hotel Transylvania: The Series	Additional voices	14 episodes
2018	Frankie Drake Mysteries	Detective Bradley	Episode: "Ties That Bind"
2018	Luna's Christmas Around the World	Senor Fabuloso	Television film
2018–2020	Burden of Truth	Sam Mercer	17 episodes
2018–2022	Let's Go Luna!	Various roles	15 episodes
2019	Bit Playas	Zebulan Zabbal	Episode: "Final Flight"
2019–present	Agent Binky: Pets of the Universe	Gordon	Main role
2020	October Faction	Chester Weiss	3 episodes
2021	Private Eyes	Jack	Episode: "The Perfect Storm"
2021	Pretty Hard Cases	Paul O'Farrell	Episode: "Dealz"
2021	Coroner	Detective West	Episode: "No Justice, No Peace"
2021	In the Dark	Officer Brandt	2 episodes
2022	Reacher	Dog Owner	3 episodes
2022	Ruby and the Well	Dennis Brogden	Episode: "I Wish I Could Walk With Her"
2022	Go, Dog. Go!	Paul Whiskerton	Season 3; 2 episodes
2023	Shelved	Bryce de Laurel	Main role
2025	Motorheads	Mr. Ruby	6 episodes
2026	Air Crash Investigation	Captain Robert Frisbie	Episode: “Deadly Charter”
