= Train 48 =

Canadian improvised soap opera

- Created by: Eric Lunsky; Duncan McKenzie
- Starring: Raoul Bhaneja; Joanne Boland; Paul Braunstein; Joe Dinicol; Krista Sutton; Ingrid Hart; Paul Sun-Hyung Lee; Andrew Kenneth Martin; Lisa Merchant; Jack Mosshammer; Amy Price-Francis
- Country of origin: Canada
- No. of episodes: 318

Production
- Executive producers: Paul Bronfman; Steve Levitan
- Running time: 25 minutes
- Budget: $40,000 (per episode)

Original release
- Network: Global Television Network
- Release: June 2, 2003 – July 1, 2005

Related
- Going Home

Train 48 was a Canadian improvised soap opera, broadcast on Global Television Network and CH from 2003 until 2005. The series was based on the format of an Australian television program called Going Home.

== Characters ==
- Liz Irwin-Gallo (Krista Sutton) (seasons 1–2, guest season 3) is a marketing expert and a senior executive at TWC, a large pharmaceutical company. After two divorces and a series of unsuccessful relationships, including with fellow passenger Randy, Liz has decided to have a child through in vitro fertilization. The character was shot in the finale of the second season and was in a coma for much of season 3, with Sutton not listed on the main cast, but was a recurring character late in the season with the character recovering from a brain injury induced by the shooting.
- Johnny McLaughlin (Paul Braunstein) is a "hoser". A handyman and construction foreman, he is often between jobs. He attempted to start his own business making sheds, "Sheds for Brains", before returning to construction and later, employment as a heavy-duty industrial cleaner in a downtown building. A loyal family man, he's been married for 18 years to Charity and has three daughters. He loves hockey, fishing, beer, and his family.
- Randy Ko (Paul Sun-Hyung Lee) is a mild-mannered engineer and scifi geek. After being dumped by his fiancée, Agnes, he enters a relationship with Liz but they broke up when she decided to have a baby through artificial insemination.
- Peter (Pete) Subramani (Raoul Bhaneja) is an ambitious stockbroker with questionable ethics and a succession of questionable get rich quick schemes.
- Lucas West (Andrew Kenneth Martin) works as a producer for a small advertising agency but has ambitions to be a film maker. He comes from a wealthy family that made its money in the oil business in Alberta but is estranged from them. He's had a string of girlfriends, some of whom are married to other men.
- Brenda Murphy (Lisa Merchant) comes from a small town out west and works as a clerical worker in downtown Toronto at Dubbin & Wallace, an insurance company. She's "forty-something", and has worked in the same department for 16 years. Her husband, Doug, died in a bicycle accident in August 2003. She has three children. A church-goer, Brenda means well but has traditional views which often get her into trouble with the other passengers, as does her love of gossip.
- Dana Davin (Joanne Boland) is an aspiring songwriter, music store employee, and activist who is returning to university and has come out as a lesbian.
- Zach Eisler (Joe Dinicol) is a junior graphic designer on an entertainment newspaper.
- Shannon Lamarche (Ingrid Hart) has worked her way up from hair salon student to expert aesthetician and co-owner of a "man spa", a chic salon in Yorkville. After Darnell in New York, Gavin, her mother's nurse, a brief dalliance with Lucas West, and, a brief affair with Anwar the weatherman, she has found true love. Dies late in season 3 from necrotizing fasciitis due to an infection after going in for a nose job.
- Nicole Svendsen (Amy Price-Francis) (season 1)
- Seymour Shackleton (Jack Mosshammer) (season 2–3) is a used car salesman, and later a tour guide, who has an extensive network of friends, which gets him in trouble when a friend whom he connects with Pete gets angry when he loses money due to Pete's business advice and puts Pete in the hospital, prompting Pete to seek revenge against Seymour.
- Dr. David Garneau (Jason Cadieux) (season 2–3) is a doctor at the Hospital for Sick Children and in a same-sex relationship with Andy. Charged with murder in season 3 after being accused of medically assisted suicide.

=== Guests ===
Regular guests included:

- Julia (Victoria Adilman)
- Naomi Reisman (Lindsay Ames)
- Mel (Kathryn Zenna)
- Ana (Monica Correa)
- Jesse (Kristin Fairlie)
- Allision (Holly Lewis)
- Bridget (Liz's mom) (Jayne Eastwood)
- Granny McLaughlin (Anne Anglin)
- Mag (Allana Harkin) has an affair with Pete in season 3 while he's engaged to Ritu.

Other guest stars on Train 48 included Rae Dawn Chong, politician Sheila Copps, Sean Cullen, Robin Duke, comedian Rick Green, Sue Johanson, Global weatherman Anwar Knight, Carolyn Parrish, Carole Pope, actor Scott Thompson, Emmy Award-winning actress Joanne Vannicola, and former MuchMusic personality Amanda Walsh. Joe Dinicol's grandfather John Neville played Zach's grandfather.

== Production and broadcast ==
The show was broadcast daily, and recorded the same day. It took place in a railway car of a GO Train on Lakeshore West line returning from Toronto to the suburb of Burlington, Ontario, and followed the lives of 12 daily commuters through their interactions. Although major plot lines were written in advance, much of the dialogue was improvised by the actors. The entire series was shot on a 64-foot replica of a GO Train Bombardier BiLevel Coach, which kept production costs to a minimum.

The train setting allowed a basic construct where characters would share and act upon their opinions and views. The same-day recording allowed for comments on topical news stories to be introduced. The filming production was completed by 1:30 p.m. and edited by 5:00 p.m., later broadcast into regular time slots in different regions of Canada throughout the day (7:00 p.m. weeknights on Global in Toronto). It is estimated that each 30 minute episode cost $40,000 (Canadian) and had a typical audience of 200,000 to 300,000 viewers a night.

The method of improvisation, developed by show runners Duncan McKenzie and Eric Lunsky, was a hybrid of techniques used by Mike Leigh and Keith Johnstone. Actors worked from outline scripts of just a few lines per scene, and an extensive character bio which provided each actor with a background of events and attitudes which might affect the scene.

The improvised format and quick turnaround enabled the inclusion of references to extremely current events, giving a heightened sense of realism and currency. For example, the 2003 North America blackout was mentioned the next day. The show typically dealt with fictional relationships, humour and the non-fictional topics mentioned were the cases of Scott Peterson, Karla Homolka, the SARS outbreak and different views about US President George W. Bush.

During the production of the series between 2003 and 2004, four episodes were aired on Global Television Network during the week. However, in 2005, this was reduced to three. The series dealt with such controversial issues as the adoption of babies by gay couples, in vitro fertilization, single parent families, and euthanasia. A number of events occurred which would be unusual on a real commuter train, including the death of a passenger, a beating, a shooting, an escaped snake, a party, and sex in the train washroom.

CanWest Global in partnership with Global had promoted the series with stories and columns in the National Post and other CanWest News newspapers.

=== Theme song ===
The series theme song was titled "Train goes" by Adam Crossley and 9 Point Landing.

== Dilemmas and criticism ==
When Train 48 debuted, product placement was an important aspect of the show for the Global Television Network. Characters were seen using Fido cell phones, and if someone was seen reading the newspaper, it was the National Post, a newspaper owned by CanWest, the parent company of Global Television. The show's producers argued that product placement was there to make the show seem more real. Later in the series, the use of product placement diminished, and the range of reading materials and products on the show became more diverse.

== Cancellation ==
The cancellation of the show was announced publicly on June 2, 2005, by series producer Cindy Wrong. She stated that the final episode would be shown on July 1. After the finale, re-runs of the last few episodes aired until the finale was shown again on September 2. The show was cancelled in order to make way for the launch of Entertainment Tonight Canada.

The producers received word of the show's cancellation ahead of time, allowing them to bring the stories to a conclusion. Throughout the series, viewers had frequently commented that the train seemed to be on a journey to nowhere. In response to this criticism, the final episode showed the train stopped, and showed, through the windows, the characters emerging from the train onto the platform at Burlington. This was the only time in the series that characters were ever seen outside the train.

== Home media ==
The producers of Train 48 have uploaded the entire series to YouTube for Canadian viewers. In the United States and Canada, episodes can be viewed on Amazon Prime Video's on demand platform.

== Legacy ==
During a 2019 reunion, four actors who appeared on Train 48 described the series as "progressive and innovative". "It was one of the first shows on Canadian TV that had a transgendered actor in a leading role. It dealt with plot lines around gay marriage, gay relationships, interracial marriage, interracial relationships", said Raoul Bhaneja. "The show was very progressive and as an ethnic actor on a Canadian television series, it was nice to see a plotline that puts people first."
