= Luca Patuelli =

Canadian breakdancer

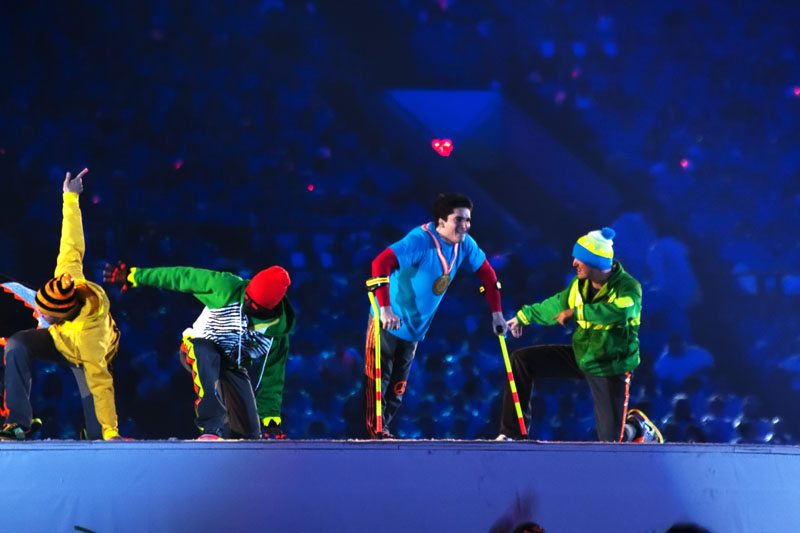
- Patuelli in 2010
- Born: July 28, 1984 (age 42); Montreal, Quebec, Canada
- Career
- Current group: ILL-Abilities
- Former groups: Illmatic Styles

Luca Patuelli (born July 28, 1984, in Montreal, Quebec), nicknamed Lazylegz, is a Canadian b-boy.

== Biography ==
He was born with Arthrogryposis multiplex congenita, a muscle disorder that affects his legs. In 2009, He graduated from Concordia University in Montreal with a BComm. Patuelli performed at the opening ceremony of the 2010 Winter Paralympics in Vancouver.

In 2015, he was awarded a Meritous Service Decoration for his work making dance more accessible to those with physical disabilities.
