= Dan Bigras =

Musical artist (born 1957)

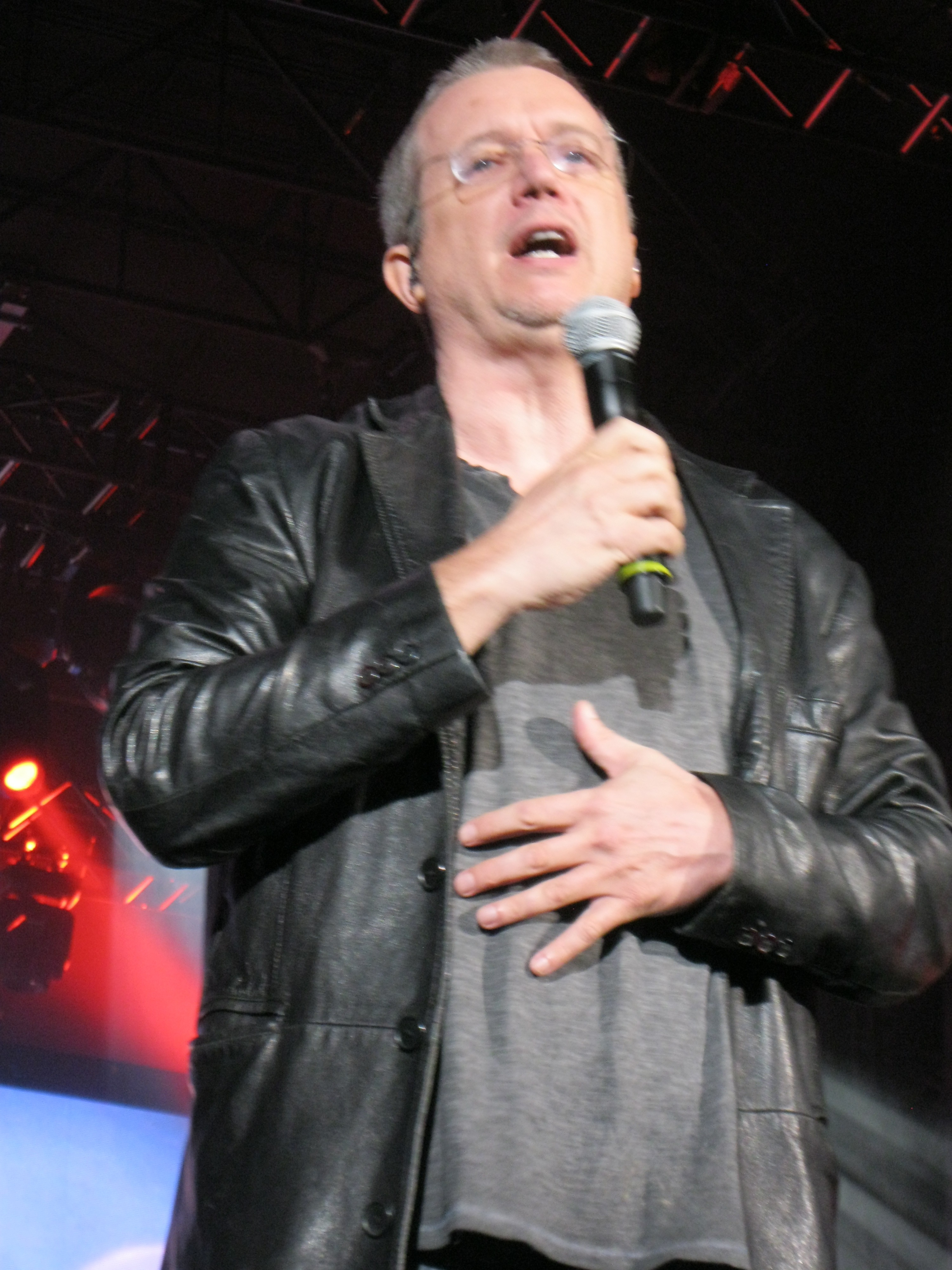
- Dan Bigras, Les FrancoFolies de Montréal; 17 June 2013

Background information
- Born: 23 December 1957 (age 68); Montreal, Quebec, Canada
- Occupations: musician, actor
- Years active: 1983–present
- Website: www.danbigras.com

Dan Bigras (born 23 December 1957) is a francophone rock singer and actor from Canada. He has released a number of albums of rock music, beginning with Ange Animal in 1990.

He is the spokesman of Refuge des Jeunes de Montréal (meaning Refuge of Montreal's youth), an agency to help homeless and at-risk youth. The organisation produces le show du Refuge each year.

== Early life ==
Bigras was born in Montreal, Quebec. He left home at age 16 and began playing rock music in bars.

== Career ==
Bigras was discovered by rock singer Gerry Boulet in 1983. In 1990 he released his first album, Ange Animal. A year later, his song "Un bateau dans une bouteille" was performed as part of the city of Montreal's 350th anniversary celebration. His second album, Tue-Moi, was nominated for a Félix Award.

Bigras worked as an actor in the 30 Vies television series. He was seen nationally in a pair of CBC miniseries dramas about Canadian biker gangs called The Last Chapter (2002), and The Last Chapter II: The War Continues (2002), as Roots Racine, the impetuous leader of the Montreal chapter of the Triple Sixers, a fictional group loosely based on the Hells Angels. These series were produced in English and French. He was nominated for a Genie Award for Best Achievement in Music - Original Song, "L'Astronaute", for the movie Angel's Rage (La Rage de l'ange).

Bigras was also the director of The Ring Within (Le Ring intérieur), a 2002 documentary film about mixed martial arts. The film was a Genie Award nominee for Best Feature Length Documentary at the 23rd Genie Awards in 2003.

His controversial 2014 album, Le sans visage, received mixed reviews. Bigras toured in Quebec that year in support of the album.

== Discography ==
- Ange Animal (1991)
- Tue-moi (1992)
- Les Immortels (1993)
- Le Fou du diable (1995)
- Le Chien (1998)
- 2000 et un enfant (1999)
- Bigras 1992/2002 Tout (2003)
- Fou (2005)
- Fan (2009)

== Filmography ==
- J'en suis! (1997)
- Rivière-des-Jérémie (2001) - TV series
- Le ring intérieur (2002)
- Tag - Épilogue (2002) - TV series
- The Last Chapter (2002) - TV miniseries
- The Last Chapter II: The War Continues (2003) - TV miniseries
- Les guerriers (TV-2004)
- Idole instantanée (2005)
- La Rage de l'ange (2006)
- 3 saisons (2008)
- 30 vies (2010)
- District 31 (2021)

== See also ==
- List of Quebec musicians
