= Penelope Buitenhuis =

Canadian film director

Penelope Buitenhuis (born 1963) is a Canadian film and television director and screenwriter. She is most noted as a two-time Directors Guild of Canada award nominee, receiving nods for the DGC Allan King Award for Best Documentary Film in 2002 for Tokyo Girls, and the DGC Award for Best Direction in a Feature Film in 2010 for A Wake.

Originally from Toronto, Ontario, she moved to Vancouver, British Columbia, in the late 1970s to study at Simon Fraser University. She subsequently moved to Berlin, Germany, for a number of years, making a number of short films with a radical artists' collective before releasing her debut feature film, Trouble, in 1993.

She subsequently returned to Canada, where she directed the films Boulevard (1994) and Giant Mine (1996).

Her other credits have included episodes of the television series Lonesome Dove, Kung Fu: The Legend Continues, Wind at My Back, Cold Squad, Power Play, Train 48, Bliss, Paradise Falls, Metropia and Pretty Hard Cases.
