= Duncan McKenzie (writer) =

Canadian TV writer and producer (born 1960)

Duncan McKenzie (born 8 November 1960 in Plymouth, England) is a Canadian TV writer and producer. He attended the University of Toronto in the late 1970s and Sheridan College in Oakville for Media Arts from 1982–1983. From 1998 to 2003, he was the writer and story editor on 108 episodes of the satirical comedy series History Bites.

From 2003 to 2005, he was the executive producer and writer for 318 episodes of the soap opera Train 48. In 2008, he was the writer and consulting producer on That's So Weird, a youth sketch comedy show.

In 2009, he started the satirical comedy website The Daily Week.
