= Benoît McGinnis =

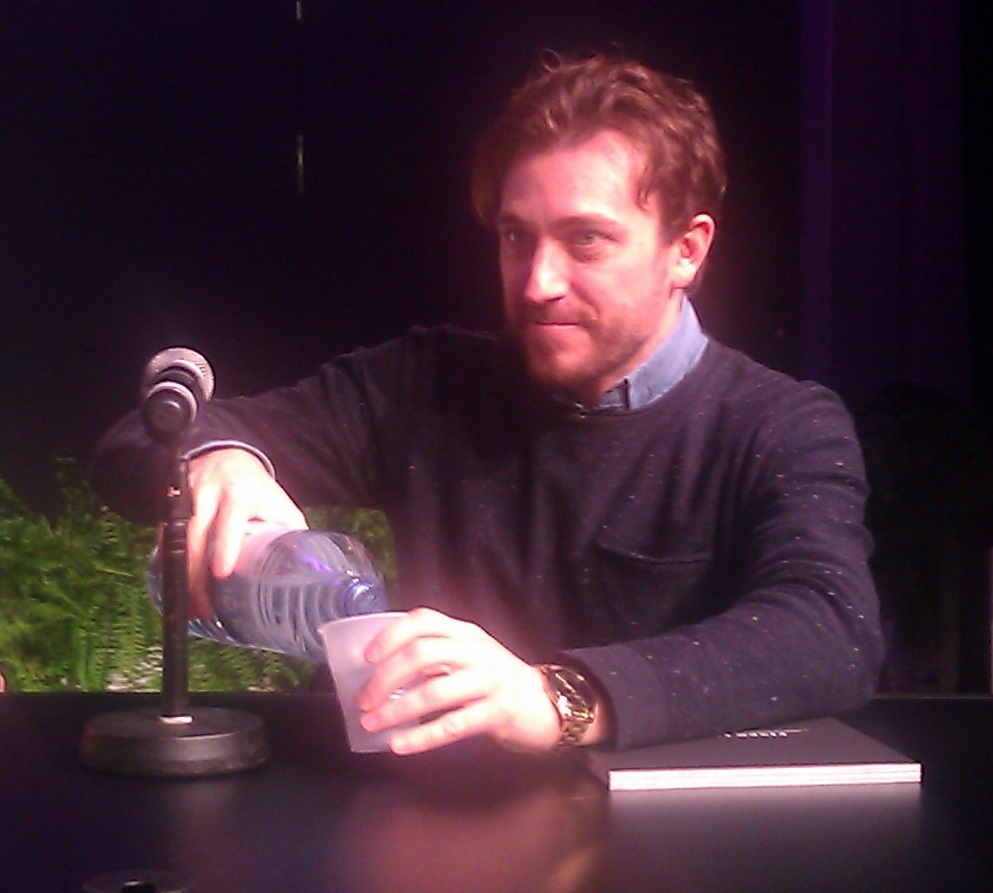
- Occupation: actor
- Years active: 2001-present

Benoît McGinnis is a Canadian theatre, film and television actor who was nominated for a Genie Award for Best Performance by an Actor in a Supporting Role for his role in Le Banquet. McGinnis has also appeared in other works including the hit TV series Les hauts et les bas de Sophie Paquin and the Canadian movies Heartbeats (Les Amours imaginaires) and Love Project (Love Projet). He graduated from the National Theatre School of Canada in 2001.
