= Julien Knafo =

Canadian composer and film director

Julien Knafo is a Canadian composer and film director from Quebec. He is most noted for the 2009 film Blind Spot (Lucidité passagère), for which he was a Jutra Award nominee for Best Original Music at the 13th Jutra Awards in 2011; he was also one of the collective film's four directors, alongside Fabrice Barrilliet, Nicolas Bolduc and Marie-Hélène Panisset.

His other credits as a composer have included The Marsh (Le Marais) and Marguerite. His solo feature debut as a director, Brain Freeze, was released in 2021.
