= It's the Heart That Dies Last =

- French: C'est le cœur qui meurt en dernier
- Directed by: Alexis Durand-Brault
- Written by: Gabriel Sabourin
- Based on: C'est le cœur qui meurt en dernier by Robert Lalonde
- Produced by: Richard Lalonde
- Starring: Gabriel Sabourin; Denise Filiatrault
- Cinematography: Jérôme Sabourin
- Edited by: Louis-Philippe Rathé
- Music by: Cœur de pirate
- Production company: Forum Films
- Distributed by: Christal Films
- Release date: April 14, 2017
- Running time: 103 minutes
- Country: Canada
- Language: French

It's the Heart That Dies Last (French: C'est le cœur qui meurt en dernier) is a Canadian drama film, directed by Alexis Durand-Brault and released in 2017.

Based on the 2013 novel by Robert Lalonde, the film stars Gabriel Sabourin as Julian, a writer who has broken through to popular success with a memoir of his dysfunctional family. He reunites with his estranged mother (Denise Filiatrault), only to learn that she is suffering from Alzheimer's disease and wants Julian's help in ending her life. Sabourin has also written the screenplay.

== Cast ==
- Denise Filiatrault - Madame Lapierre at 82
- Gabriel Sabourin - Julien
- Sophie Lorain - Madame Lapierre at 48
- Paul Doucet - Henri
- Geneviève Rioux - Marie-Ève
- Céline Bonnier - Catherine
- Isabelle Blais - Martine
- Robert Lalonde - Le Barman
- Monique Mercure - Tante Pierrette
- Guy Sprung : Gouverneur général
- Karelle Tremblay - young Marie-Ève jeune

== Accolades ==
The film received six nominations at the 6th Canadian Screen Awards in 2018, including Best Motion Picture.

Award	Date of ceremony	Category	Recipient(s)	Result	Ref(s)
Canadian Screen Awards	11 March 2018	Best Motion Picture	Richard Lalonde	Nominated	
Canadian Screen Awards	11 March 2018	Best Director	Alexis Durand-Brault	Nominated	
Canadian Screen Awards	11 March 2018	Best Actress	Denise Filiatrault	Nominated	
Canadian Screen Awards	11 March 2018	Best Actor	Gabriel Sabourin	Nominated	
Canadian Screen Awards	11 March 2018	Best Adapted Screenplay	Gabriel Sabourin	Nominated	
Canadian Screen Awards	11 March 2018	Best Editing	Louis-Philippe Rathé	Nominated	
Prix Iris	3 June 2018	Best Actress	Denise Filiatrault	Nominated	
Prix Iris	3 June 2018	Best Screenplay	Gabriel Sabourin	Nominated	
