= It's Your Turn, Laura Cadieux =

- French: C't'à ton tour, Laura Cadieux
- Directed by: Denise Filiatrault
- Written by: Denise Filiatrault
- Based on: C't'à ton tour, Laura Cadieux by Michel Tremblay
- Produced by: Denise Robert
- Starring: Ginette Reno; Pierrette Robitaille; Sophie Lorain
- Cinematography: Daniel Jobin
- Edited by: Richard Comeau
- Music by: François Dompierre
- Production companies: Cinémaginaire; Viacom Canada; Telefilm Canada
- Distributed by: Alliance Atlantis
- Release date: 1998
- Running time: 91 minutes
- Country: Canada
- Language: French

It's Your Turn, Laura Cadieux (French: C't'à ton tour, Laura Cadieux) is a Canadian comedy film, directed by Denise Filiatrault and released in 1998. The film was based on the comedic novel by Michel Tremblay.

The film centers on a group of women in Montreal who meet once a week at a weight loss clinic. Led by the titular Laura Cadieux (Ginette Reno), the women exchange stories and jokes and gossip in the waiting room. The women include Mme Bolduc (Adèle Reinhardt), who also suffers from eczema; the clinically depressed Mme Gladu (Mireille Thibault); the pregnant Mme Tardif (Sophie Lorain); and Mme Brouillette (Denise Dubois), a comic book fanatic. Meanwhile Laura's best friend, Mme Therrien (Pierrette Robitaille), spends the entire film running around the city on a wild goose chase after Laura's son briefly got separated from them in the Montreal Metro en route to the appointment, and she immediately rushed off to find him entirely unaware that he turned up safe just moments later; and Vovonne (Danièle Lorain), another woman normally part of the group, has won a large sum of money at the casino and goes to her husband's workplace to tell him the news, but is getting stalled by his assistant Albert (Martin Drainville) because her husband is having sex with her friend Alice (Sonia Vachon) in the back room.

At the 19th Genie Awards, both Reno and Robitaille were nominated for Best Actress, and Tremblay and François Dompierre were nominated for Best Original Song for "Laura la belle". A sequel film, Laura Cadieux II (Laura Cadieux...la suite), was released in 1999.
