= Home Team =

Home Team can refer to:

- Home team, a sports team playing at Home (sports), which has the home advantage
- Home Team (1998 film), a 1998 film by Allan A. Goldstein
- Home Team (2022 film), a film by Charles and Daniel Kinnane
- The Home Team, a Seattle-based pop punk band
