= 21st Genie Awards =

2001 Canadian film awards ceremony

- Date: 2001
- Hosted by: Brian Linehan

Highlights
- Best Picture: Maelström
- Most nominations: Maelström

The 21st Genie Awards were held in 2001 to honour films released in 2000. The ceremony was hosted by Brian Linehan.

== Nominees and winners ==
The Genie Award winner in each category is shown in bold along with nominees.

| Motion Picture | Direction |
|---|---|
| **Maelström — Roger Frappier and Luc Vandal**; Love Come Down — Eric Jordan, Clement Virgo and Damon D'Oliveira; New Waterford Girl — Julia Sereny and Jennifer Kawaja; Possible Worlds — Bruno Jobin and Sandra Cunningham; Stardom — Denise Robert and Robert Lantos; To Walk with Lions — Julie Allen and Pieter Kroonenberg | **Denis Villeneuve, Maelström**; Alain DesRochers, The Bottle (La Bouteille); Robert Favreau, The Orphan Muses (Les Muses orphelines); Robert Lepage, Possible Worlds; Gary Burns, waydowntown |
| Actor in a leading role | Actress in a leading role |
| **Tony Nardi, My Father's Angel**; James Whitmore, Here's to Life!; Timothy Webber, My Father's Angel; Colm Feore, The Perfect Son; David Cubitt, The Perfect Son | **Marie-Josée Croze, Maelström**; Kim Hunter, Here's to Life!; Ginette Reno, Laura Cadieux II (Laura Cadieux...la suite); Pierrette Robitaille, Laura Cadieux II (Laura Cadieux...la suite); Tilda Swinton, Possible Worlds |
| Actor in a supporting role | Actress in a supporting role |
| **Martin Cummins, Love Come Down**; Patrick Huard, Life After Love (La Vie après l'amour); Jean-Nicolas Verreault, Maelström; Nicholas Campbell, New Waterford Girl; Ian Bannen, To Walk with Lions | **Helen Shaver, We All Fall Down**; Annick Bergeron, Pandora's Beauty (La Beauté de Pandore); Céline Bonnier, The Orphan Muses (Les Muses orphelines); Barbara Williams, Love Come Down; Mary Walsh, New Waterford Girl; Stacy Smith, New Waterford Girl |
| Screenplay | Documentary |
| **Denis Villeneuve, Maelström**; Clement Virgo, Love Come Down; Gilles Desjardins and Michel Marc Bouchard, The Orphan Muses (Les Muses orphelines); Frank Borg, My Father's Angel; Denys Arcand and Jacob Potashnik, Stardom | **Grass — Ron Mann**; Rocks at Whiskey Trench — Alanis Obomsawin; Spirits of Havana — Bay Weyman, Peter Starr and Luis O. Garcia; Cinéma Vérité: Defining the Moment — Éric Michel, Adam Symansky and Peter Wintonick; The Fairy Faith — John Walker and Kent Martin |
| Best Live Action Short Drama | Best Animated Short |
| **The Little Varius (Le P'tit Varius) — André Théberge and Alain Jacques**; Clean Rite Cowboy — Joel Awerbuck and Michael Downing; Below the Belt — Kate Gillen, Dominique Cardona and Laurie Colbert; Foxy Lady, Wild Cherry — Marlene Rodgers and Inez Buchli; Soul Cages — Simone Urdl and Phillip Barker | **Village of Idiots — Michael J. F. Scott, Eugene Fedorenko, Rose Newlove, David Verrall and John Spotton**; Cuckoo, Mr. Edgar! (Coucou, Monsieur Edgar!) — Thérèse Descary and Pierre M. Trudeau; From the Big Bang to Tuesday Morning — Thérèse Descary, Claude Cloutier, Marcel Jean and Jean-Jacques Leduc |
| Art Direction/Production Design | Cinematography |
| **François Séguin and Danièle Rouleau, Possible Worlds**; Anne Pritchard and Ginette Robitaille, The Art of War; Sylvain Gingras, Maelström; Emanuel Jannasch and Norma Jean Sanders, New Waterford Girl; Zoe Sakellaropoulo and Jean Morin, Stardom | **André Turpin, Maelström**; Pierre Gill, The Art of War; Jonathan Freeman, Possible Worlds; Guy Dufaux, Stardom; Jean Lépine, To Walk with Lions |
| Costume Design | Editing |
| **Michel Robidas, Stardom**; Patricia Hargreaves, Here's to Life!; Suzanne Harel, Laura Cadieux II (Laura Cadieux...la suite); Debra Hanson, New Waterford Girl; Denis Sperdouklis, Life After Love (La Vie après l'amour) | **Susan Shipton, Possible Worlds**; Michel Arcand, The Art of War; Richard Comeau, Maelström; Hélène Girard, The Orphan Muses (Les Muses orphelines); Susan Maggi, New Waterford Girl |
| Overall Sound | Sound Editing |
| **Daniel Pellerin, Paul Adlaf, Peter Kelly, Brad Thornton and Brad Zoern, Love Come Down**; Hans Peter Strobl, Jo Caron, Don Cohen and Bernard Gariépy Strobl, The Art of War; Bill Sheppard, Mark Berger and Ruth Huddleston, Here's to Life!; Gilles Corbeil, Luc Boudrias and Louis Gignac, Maelström; Tom Ronan, Daniel Pellerin, Brad Thornton and Brad Zoern, Violet | **David McCallum, Fred Brennan, Sue Conley, Steve Hammond, Garrett Kerr, Jane Tattersall and Robert Warchol, Love Come Down**; Michel B. Bordeleau, Pierre-Jules Audet, Jérôme Décarie, Natalie Fleurant and Marc Gagnon, The Art of War; Dean Giammarco, Maija Burnett, Kris Fenske, John Ludgate and Brendan Ostrander, Here's to Life!; Mathieu Beaudin, Jérôme Décarie, Carole Gagnon, Antoine Morin and François B. Senneville, Maelström; Glenn Tussman, Richard Betanzos, Michael Gurman, Steven Gurman, Paul Hubert and Vicent Regaudie, To Walk with Lions |
| Achievement in Music: Original Score | Achievement in Music: Original Song |
| **Patric Caird, Here's to Life!**; Normand Corbeil, The Art of War; François Dompierre, Laura Cadieux II (Laura Cadieux...la suite); Aaron Davis and John Lang, Love Come Down; Alan Reeves, To Walk with Lions | **François Dompierre, "Fortuna" — Laura Cadieux II (Laura Cadieux...la suite)**; Michael Bublé, "Dumb Ol' Heart" — Here's to Life!; Michael Bublé, "I've Never Been in Love Before" — Here's to Life!; Deborah Cox, Keith Andes and Lascelles Stephens, "29" — Love Come Down; Deborah Cox, Keith Andes and Lascelles Stephens, "Our Love" — Love Come Down |
| Special awards | |
| Claude Jutra Award: Philippe Falardeau, The Left-Hand Side of the Fridge (La Moitié gauche du frigo); Golden Reel Award: The Art of War | |
