= The Mills of Power =

- French: Les Tisserands du pouvoir
- Written by: Claude Fournier; Michel Cournot; Marie-José Raymond
- Directed by: Claude Fournier
- Music by: Martin Fournier; Normand Corbeil
- Country of origin: Canada
- Original languages: French; English

Production
- Producers: René Malo; Marie-José Raymond
- Cinematography: John Berrie
- Editors: Claude Fournier; Yurij Luhovy
- Production companies: Ciné les Tisserands; Groupe Malofilm

Original release
- Network: Télévision de Radio-Canada
- Release: 1989 – 1989

The Mills of Power (French: Les Tisserands du pouvoir) is a Canadian television miniseries, directed by Claude Fournier. A historical drama, the film centres on the historical phenomenon of French Canadians who emigrated to New England for work opportunities, tracing their gradual loss of socioeconomic status, political power and cultural identity through the story of a community of French Canadian Americans in Woonsocket, Rhode Island. The story is centred mainly on three families: the working class Lamberts, who worked in the dying textile mills and clung strongly to their Québécois heritage; the more middle-class Fontaines, who integrated more successfully into mainstream American life; and the wealthy Roussels, an industrialist family from France who owned the mills and exploited the Québécois immigrants.

The cast included many of the most noted Quebec actors, including Gratien Gélinas, Rémy Girard, Dominique Michel, Denise Filiatrault, Juliette Huot, Donald Pilon, Anne Létourneau, Andrée Pelletier, Michel Forget, Gabrielle Lazure, Olivette Thibault, Jocelyn Bérubé, Charlotte Laurier, Paul Almond and André Melançon, as well as English Canadian actors John Wildman, Vlasta Vrána and John Boylan as anglophone characters.

The series premiered theatrically in 1988 as two films, Les Tisserands du pouvoir and Les Tisserands du pouvoir 2: La révolte, before airing as a six-part miniseries on Télévision de Radio-Canada in 1989, and on CBC Television in 1990. Fournier also published a novelization of the miniseries concurrently with the theatrical debut.

The series received two Genie Award nominations at the 10th Genie Awards in 1989, for Best Original Screenplay (Fournier, Michel Cournot and Marie-José Raymond) and Best Costume Design (Christine Cost, Michèle Hamel). The series won four Prix Gémeaux in 1990, for Best Miniseries, Best Direction in a Drama Series (Fournier), Best Writing in a Drama Series (Raymond, Fournier, Cournot) and Best Actor in a Drama Series (Forget).
