= Alice's Odyssey =

2002 Canadian film

- French: L'Odyssée d'Alice Tremblay
- Directed by: Denise Filiatrault
- Written by: Sylvie Lussier; Pierre Poirier
- Produced by: Daniel Louis; Denise Robert
- Starring: Sophie Lorain; Martin Drainville; Pierrette Robitaille; Marc Labrèche
- Cinematography: Pierre Gill
- Edited by: Yvann Thibaudeau
- Music by: François Dompierre
- Production companies: Cinémaginaire; Film Fabuleux
- Distributed by: Alliance Atlantis Vivafilm
- Release date: June 28, 2002
- Running time: 102 minutes
- Country: Canada
- Language: French

Alice's Odyssey (French: L'Odyssée d'Alice Tremblay) is a Canadian family comedy fantasy film, directed by Denise Filiatrault and released in 2002. The film stars Sophie Lorain as Alice Tremblay, a single mother who becomes drawn into the fairy tale that she is reading to her young daughter as a bedtime story.

The cast also includes Martin Drainville, Pierrette Robitaille, Marc Labrèche, Mitsou Gélinas, Danielle Ouimet, Marc Béland, Pascale Desrochers, Myriam Poirier, Gordon Masten, Louise Portal, Jacques Languirand, Liliana Komorowska, France D'Amour, Pierre Lebeau, Denise Bombardier and Michel Barrette.

The film received two Jutra Award nominations at the 5th Jutra Awards in 2003, for Best Art Direction (Michel Proulx, François Barbeau) and Best Sound (Yvon Benoît, Marie-Claude Gagné, Gavin Fernandes).
