= The Tin Flute (film) =

1983 film

- French: Bonheur d'occasion
- Directed by: Claude Fournier
- Written by: Marie-José Raymond; Claude Fournier; Gabrielle Roy (book)
- Produced by: Robert Verrall; Marie-José Raymond
- Starring: Mireille Deyglun
- Cinematography: Savas Kalogeras
- Edited by: Yves Langlois
- Music by: François Dompierre
- Release dates: July 1983 (Moscow); 28 August 1983 (Canada)
- Running time: 123 minutes
- Country: Canada
- Languages: English, French

The Tin Flute (French: Bonheur d'occasion) is a 1983 Canadian drama film directed by Claude Fournier and based on the Gabrielle Roy novel of the same name.

The film was co-produced by the National Film Board of Canada's French-language branch, Ciné St-Henri Inc., and Société Radio-Canada, the French-language branch of the Canadian Broadcasting Corporation.

It was entered into the 13th Moscow International Film Festival. The film was selected as the Canadian entry for the Best Foreign Language Film at the 56th Academy Awards, but it was not accepted as a nominee.

== Cast ==
- Mireille Deyglun as Florentine Lacasse
- Pierre Chagnon as Jean
- Michel Forget as Azarius Lacasse
- Marilyn Lightstone as Rose-Anna Lacasse
- Charlotte Laurier as Yvonne
- Thuryn Pranke as Philippe
- Thomas Hellman as Daniel
- Martin Neufeld as Emmanuel
- Linda Sorgini as Marguerite
- Dennis O'Connor as Phil Morin
- Howard Ryshpan as Docteur Katz

== See also ==
- List of submissions to the 56th Academy Awards for Best Foreign Language Film
- List of Canadian submissions for the Academy Award for Best Foreign Language Film
