= Gabriel Sabourin =

Canadian actor and screenwriter

- Occupations: Actor, screenwriter
- Known for: It's the Heart That Dies Last (C'est le cœur qui meurt en dernier)
- Awards: Nominated for Canadian Screen Award for Best Actor and Canadian Screen Award for Best Adapted Screenplay

Gabriel Sabourin is a Canadian actor and screenwriter from Quebec. He is most noted for the 2017 film It's the Heart That Dies Last (C'est le cœur qui meurt en dernier), for which he received Canadian Screen Award nominations for Best Actor and Best Adapted Screenplay at the 6th Canadian Screen Awards.

He is the son of actor Marcel Sabourin, and a graduate of the National Theatre School of Canada.
