= Far from You Sweetheart =

- French: Je suis loin de toi mignonnne
- Directed by: Claude Fournier
- Screenplay by: Dominique Michel; Denise Filiatrault; Claude Fournier
- Produced by: Gerald Potterton; Claude Fournier; Pierre David; Tony Roman; Marie-José Raymond
- Starring: Dominique Michel; Denise Filiatrault
- Cinematography: Bernard Gosselin; Claude Fournier
- Edited by: Claude Fournier
- Music by: Tony Roman; Ti-Blanc Richard
- Production companies: Rose Films; Les Productions Mutuelles
- Distributed by: Les Films Mutuelles
- Release date: November 4, 1976
- Running time: 109 minutes
- Country: Canada
- Language: French

Far from You Sweetheart (French: Je suis loin de toi mignonne) is a 1976 Canadian comedy-drama film, directed by Claude Fournier. The film stars Dominique Michel and Denise Filiatrault as Rita and Florence, two sisters who are working in a munitions factory during World War II, while still dreaming of finding husbands and getting married.

The cast also includes René Caron, Carole Dagenais, Denis Drouin, Bernard Gosselin, Juliette Huot, Marc Legault, Marcel Pothier, Gilles Renaud, Jean-Pierre Masson and Gilbert Sicotte.

Maurice Élia of the film magazine Séquences compared the film negatively to the 1975 wartime drama Bound for Glory (Partis pour la gloire), calling it a vulgar farce that wasn't actually funny enough to call it a comedy. Writing for Le Devoir, André Leroux opined that Fournier had no idea how to construct a screenplay, a compelling plot or believable characters. Despite its negative critical reception, however, the film was moderately successful at the Quebec box office, and Michel later named it as one of the films she was most proud of in her career, in part because she had been directly involved in writing it.

It was included in a retrospective of Michel's career at the Cinémathèque québécoise in 2017.
