= Maelström (film) =

- Theatrical release poster
- Directed by: Denis Villeneuve
- Written by: Denis Villeneuve
- Produced by: Roger Frappier; Luc Vandal
- Starring: Marie-Josée Croze; Jean-Nicolas Verreault
- Narrated by: Pierre Lebeau
- Cinematography: André Turpin
- Edited by: Richard Comeau
- Music by: Pierre Desrochers
- Distributed by: Alliance Atlantis
- Release dates: 29 August 2000 (MWFF); 15 September 2000 (Canada)
- Running time: 88 minutes
- Country: Canada
- Language: French
- Budget: $3.4 million
- Box office: $254,380

Maelström is a 2000 Canadian absurdist psychological drama film written and directed by Denis Villeneuve. It stars Marie-Josée Croze as a depressed young businesswoman who becomes romantically involved with the son of a man she killed in a hit-and-run accident. Employing fantasy and comedic elements, Maelström is narrated by a talking fish.

Villeneuve conceived of the story, basing it on his interest in car accidents and modelling the protagonist after various women he knew. He cast Croze, then a novice actress, in the lead role. Filming took place in Montreal in 1999, with animatronics to depict the fish narrator.

The film premiered at the Montréal World Film Festival in August 2000 and received positive reviews, with some detractors. It won five Genie Awards, including Best Motion Picture, and the FIPRESCI Prize at the 51st Berlin International Film Festival. Maelström was announced as Canada's submission for the Academy Award for Best International Feature Film at the 73rd Academy Awards, but it was not nominated.

== Plot ==
While being gutted alive by a fishmonger, a dying fish chooses to share a story that took place in Quebec during the autumn of 1999. A 25-year-old businesswoman named Bibiane Champagne, head of three clothing boutiques, has an abortion. She is interviewed by a journalist about her success and being the daughter of a famous person named Flo Fabert. Bibiane claims business is good, but her partner and brother, Philippe, accosts her for numerous failures. She is supported by her friend, Claire, but struggles with drugs and alcohol.

One night, while driving, Bibiane accidentally hits a 53-year-old Norwegian Canadian fishmonger, Annstein Karson, and subsequently flees the scene. Injured, Annstein stumbles back to his apartment, where he dies at the kitchen table. While at a restaurant, Claire and Bibiane order octopus but discover it is stale. The restaurant investigates the poor quality of octopus and realize the usual octopus trapper, Annstein, is missing, and the police find him dead. Bibiane reads confirmation of the death in a newspaper, and considers turning herself in; she confides in a stranger on a subway and consults him about turning herself in, but he tells her this will not bring the victim back. She eventually decides to dispose of the evidence, driving her car into a river. She survives, and interprets her survival as a sign that she deserves to recover her life.

The fishmonger's son Evian, a diver who was recently inspecting the Manicouagan River, learns Annstein was cremated. This went against his plans for burial at sea. He encounters Bibiane by chance, and she poses as his late father's neighbour, helping Evian sort through Annstein's possessions. Evian falls in love with her, and she takes him away from a planned flight to have sex at her apartment. He later learns the plane crashed in Baie-Comeau with no survivors, and Bibiane tells him that she killed his father. Conflicted about his love for his father's killer, a stranger in a bar (the same man from the subway) tells him to marry her and never tell anyone.

Bibiane accompanies Evian to Lofoten to dispose of the ashes. Finally, the fish narrator decides to conclude his story by revealing the meaning of life, but is killed mid-sentence.

== Production ==
=== Development ===
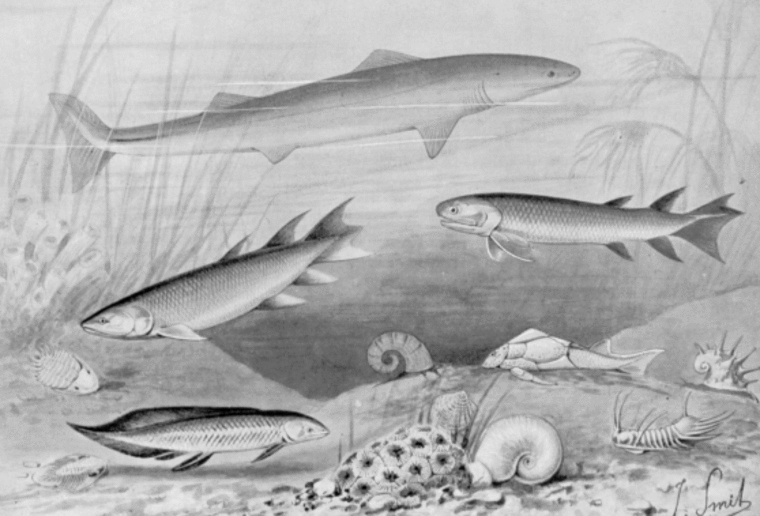
Villeneuve conceived of a fantastic element for his story, with a talking fish narrator; he modeled the character on prehistoric fish.

Director Denis Villeneuve conceived of a story, that would revolve around a car accident:

It's more a film about responsibility and [clarity]. Car crashes are the most dramatic events common and closest to us. That's why I'm very interested in them ... The film is a dark tale. One of its subjects is mythology. There's a strange narrator telling the story from a fantasy world. It's a hyper-realistic film, but it goes very close to fantasy at some points.

For Bibiane, Villeneuve modeled the character after numerous women he knew, one of whom he described as a "mythomaniac", like Bibiane. He began making notes on the story in spring 1998, while finishing his film August 32nd on Earth, but set it aside as "too difficult", given its detached heroine. He began working on the Maelström screenplay again later that year, due to his persistent visions of the story. He began pitching the screenplay, and later said some readers told him it gave them nightmares, and that it was "too dark and heavy", though Villeneuve regarded it as nearly comedic. Downplaying the dark subject matter, he described the story as "a playful call to be responsible and to be careful". In his efforts for "balance" in respect to the abortion scene, Villeneuve said he was pro-choice but the operation "should never be taken lightly".

The inspiration for the narration was a trout he had for dinner, which gave him food poisoning. This led him to choose a fish as the storyteller, which he also liked because it would add "a purely fictional element" to an otherwise realistic story. He had also contemplated the alternative of a talking dog, based on a puppy his family had recently adopted, but preferred the metaphor of "a fish out of water". In his story, the fish is being gutted and repeatedly dies only to resurrect and resume narration. Villeneuve explained this, saying, "For me it was the kind of image which was like all the storytellers from the beginning of humanity trying to tell a story, the same story over and over again. I think it's an image that is like my relationship with cinema. And then I think there's a link between storytelling and death".

=== Casting ===
Actor	Role
Marie-Josée Croze	Bibiane Champagne
Jean-Nicolas Verreault	Evian
Stephanie Morgenstern	Claire
Pierre Lebeau	voice of the Fish

In summer 1999, casting began. Villeneuve sought "someone with a very specific energy" for the lead, and during casting met novice actress Marie-Josée Croze for the first time. He chose her with no pressure from the financiers to choose a better-known star. Jean-Nicholas Verrault was cast with experience in television, while Stephanie Morgenstern was known for appearing in the 1997 The Sweet Hereafter.

=== Filming ===
Principal photography started in Montreal in September 1999, lasting until November. The fish narrator was portrayed via animatronics; while inspired by a trout, the model was designed to resemble a prehistoric species "with big black eyes and a sad, gaping mouth".

== Release ==
Maelström premiered at the Montreal World Film Festival on 29 August 2000, before opening the Perspective Canada section in the Toronto International Film Festival in September 2000. The film had its U.S. debut at the Sundance Film Festival in January 2001, where it received a positive audience response.

In early 1999, Alliance Atlantis chose to distribute the film in Quebec and internationally, while Odeon Films would release the film in the rest of Canada. It went to Canadian theatres on 15 September 2000. In July 2001, it opened on three screens in Paris and 11 total in France, to a small audience of 300 people on its first day.

== Reception ==
=== Critical response ===
The review aggregator website Rotten Tomatoes reported that 79% of critics have given the film a positive review based on 38 reviews, with an average rating of 6.7/10. The website's critical consensus states: "A peculiar breach of morality that leads with pretension: Denis Villeneuve guides Maelstrom through teetering absurdity without malicious intent". On Metacritic, the film has a weighted average score of 66 out of 100 based on 18 critics, indicating "generally favorable reviews".

Voir critic Éric Fourlanty positively reviewed the photography and direction, comparing it to a dream, but found the writing lacking in places. The Ottawa Citizen's Jay Stone gave it three and a half stars, and wrote it "aches with allegory" but had humour. For Variety, Dennis Harvey called the first two-thirds " enjoyably idiosyncratic", with a "slightly supernatural, fate-ridden atmosphere". Vincent Ostria wrote in Les Inrockuptibles that the production initially disappointed, but it featured whimsy and an ironic use of music, and Villeneuve was among the better Canadian directors behind Atom Egoyan. Stephen Holden assessed it as "a meditation on the disconnection between the glossy surfaces of high-end urban existence and the life-and-death realities they camouflage", with Dadaist elements. In The Los Angeles Times, Kevin Thomas hailed it as a "stylish, breathless film, very much the dynamic work of a young man [Villeneuve] of talent, passion and brashness". Slant Magazine's Ed Gonzalez dismissed it as "instantly forgettable". The Washington Post critic Ann Hornaday called it "beautifully composed" in parts but ultimately disappointing.

In 2001, an industry poll conducted by Playback named it the ninth best Canadian film of the preceding 15 years.

In 2017, IndieWire ranked Maelström as Villeneuve's worst film, though not so much "a bad film so much as it is a half-baked one". The Canadian Press recalled it that year as an "off-beat parable" that "showcases Villeneuve's more avant-garde sensibilities".

=== Accolades ===
Maelström received 10 nominations, more than any other film at the 21st Genie Awards. It won five, including Best Motion Picture. Canada submitted it for the Academy Award for Best Foreign Language Film, but it did not receive a nomination. Producer Roger Frappier and Croze, hoping to secure an Academy Award nomination, also unsuccessfully campaigned for a Golden Globe Award for Best Foreign Language Film nomination, screening the film for 60 members of the Hollywood Foreign Press Association in Los Angeles in winter 2000.

Award	Date of ceremony	Category	Recipient(s)	Result	Ref.
Berlin International Film Festival	7–18 February 2001	FIPRESCI Prize	Denis Villeneuve	Won	
Genie Awards	29 January 2001	Best Motion Picture	Roger Frappier, Luc Vandal	Won	
Genie Awards	29 January 2001	Best Direction	Denis Villeneuve	Won	
Genie Awards	29 January 2001	Best Screenplay	Denis Villeneuve	Won	
Genie Awards	29 January 2001	Best Actress	Marie-Josée Croze	Won	
Genie Awards	29 January 2001	Best Supporting Actor	Jean-Nicolas Verreault	Nominated	
Genie Awards	29 January 2001	Best Cinematography	André Turpin	Won	
Genie Awards	29 January 2001	Best Editing	Richard Comeau	Nominated	
Genie Awards	29 January 2001	Art Direction / Production Design	Sylvain Gingras	Nominated	
Genie Awards	29 January 2001	Best Overall Sound	Luc Boudrias, Gilles Corbeil, Louis Gignac	Nominated	
Genie Awards	29 January 2001	Best Sound Editing	Mathieu Beaudin, Jérôme Décarie, Carole Gagnon, Antoine Morin, François B. Senneville	Nominated	
Jutra Awards	25 February 2001	Best Film	Roger Frappier, Luc Vandal	Won	
Jutra Awards	25 February 2001	Best Director	Denis Villeneuve	Won	
Jutra Awards	25 February 2001	Best Screenplay	Denis Villeneuve	Won	
Jutra Awards	25 February 2001	Best Actress	Marie-Josée Croze	Won	
Jutra Awards	25 February 2001	Best Art Direction	Sylvain Gingras, Denis Sperdouklis	Won	
Jutra Awards	25 February 2001	Best Cinematography	André Turpin	Won	
Jutra Awards	25 February 2001	Best Editing	Richard Comeau	Won	
Jutra Awards	25 February 2001	Best Sound	Mathieu Beaudin, Gilles Corbeil, Louis Gignac	Won	
Montréal World Film Festival	25 August–4 September 2000	Best Canadian Film	Denis Villeneuve	Won	
Montréal World Film Festival	25 August–4 September 2000	Best Artistic Contribution	André Turpin	Won	
Toronto Film Critics Association	17 December 2000	Best Canadian Film	Denis Villeneuve	Runner-up	
Toronto International Film Festival	7–16 September 2000	Best Canadian Film Special Mention	Denis Villeneuve	Won	
Vancouver Film Critics Circle	February 2001	Best Canadian Film	Denis Villeneuve	Won	
Vancouver Film Critics Circle	February 2001	Best Canadian Director	Denis Villeneuve	Won	
Vancouver Film Critics Circle	February 2001	Best Canadian Actress	Marie-Josée Croze	Won	

== See also ==
- List of submissions to the 73rd Academy Awards for Best Foreign Language Film
- List of Canadian submissions for the Academy Award for Best Foreign Language Film
