= Marie-Josée Croze =

Canadian actress (born 1970)

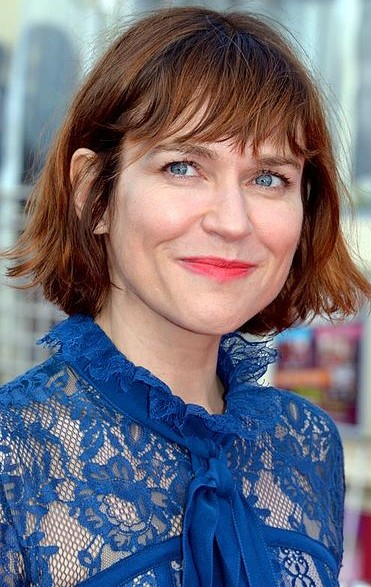
- Marie-Josée Croze, 2016
- Born: February 23, 1970 (age 56); Montreal, Quebec, Canada
- Occupation: Actress
- Years active: 1989–present

Marie-Josée Croze (French: [maʁi ʒoze kʁɔz]) is a Canadian actress. She also holds French nationality, which she obtained in December 2012.

== Early life ==
Croze was born February 23, 1970, in Montreal, Quebec, was adopted, and grew up in Longueuil, Quebec, with four other children. She studied fine arts in a two-year program at the Cégep du Vieux Montréal, during 1986–1987.

== Career ==
Her film debut came in 1993 with the movie La Florida. She gained widespread recognition with the lead role in Maelström (2000), directed by Denis Villeneuve. That role brought her major Canadian acting awards.

Her international breakthrough came with the 2003 film The Barbarian Invasions (Denys Arcand), for which she was awarded Best Actress at the Cannes Film Festival.

After Cannes, she began working more in European and international cinema. Her credits include high-profile and diverse films such as:

- Munich (2005) - by Steven Spielberg, marking one of her early major English-language roles.
- The Diving Bell and the Butterfly (2007) - a ctitically acclaimed film by director Julian Schnabel.
- A range of French-language films and collaborations with respected European directors through subsequent years.

== Recognition and awards ==
She received the award for Best Performance by an Actress in a Leading Role at the 21st Genie Awards for her role in Denis Villeneuve's Maelström (2000).

She won the Best Actress award at the 2003 Cannes Film Festival for her performance in The Barbarian Invasions. She was cast by director Steven Spielberg in his film Munich, released in December 2005. She also appeared as a speech therapist in Julian Schnabel's 2007 film adaptation of Jean-Dominique Bauby's memoir The Diving Bell and the Butterfly.

In November 2012, she was selected as a member of the main competition jury at the 2012 International Film Festival of Marrakech.

== Selected filmography ==
=== Film ===
- La postière (1992): Fille du bordel
- La Florida (1993): Carmen
- HLA identique (1998): Marie
- Maelström (2000): Bibiane Champagne
- Ascension (2002): Pregnant Woman (lead)
- Ararat (2002): Celia
- Des chiens dans la neige (2002): Lucie
- Battlefield Earth: A Saga of the Year 3000 (2002): Mara
- Nothing (2003): Sara
- The Barbarian Invasions (2003): Nathalie
- Mensonges et trahisons et plus si affinités... (2004): Muriel
- Ordo (2004): Louise Sandoli
- Taking Lives (2004): Medical Examiner
- Munich (2005): Jeanette the Dutch Assassin
- The Girl from the Chartreuse (original title: La petite chartreuse) (2005): Pascale Blanchot
- Ne le dis à personne (Tell No One) (2006): Margot Beck
- La mémoire des autres (2006): Constance
- Les oiseaux du ciel (2006): Tango
- Le scaphandre et le papillon (The Diving Bell and the Butterfly) (2007): Henriette Roi
- Jacquou le Croquant (2007): La mère de Jacquou
- Deux jours à tuer (2008): Cécile
- Le nouveau protocole (2008): (post-production)
- Vivre! (2009)
- Je l'aimais (2009): Mathilde
- Un balcon sur la mer (2009)
- Hidden Diary (2009): Louise
- Liberté (2009): Mlle Lundi
- Murder on the Orient Express TV (2010): Greta Ohlsson
- Another Silence (2011)
- La Certosa di Parma (2012)
- Collision (2013)
- Calvary (2014)
- An Eye for Beauty (2014)
- Every Thing Will Be Fine (2015)
- 2 Nights Till Morning (2015): Caroline
- Au nom de ma fille (2016)
- The Confessions (2016)
- Iqaluit (2016)
- MILF (2018): Sonia
- Disappearance at Clifton Hill (2019): Mrs. Moulin
- The Forgiven (2021): Isabelle
- Breaking Point (2023): Juliette
- Neverman (2026)

=== Television ===
- Chambres en ville (1989): Noémie Vanasse
- Le choix (1991, TV Movie)
- Montréal P.Q. (1992)
- Zelda (1993, TV Movie): Nanny
- The Hunger (1997): Woman / Mimi
- Le masque (1997): Nadine Mallette
- Captive (1998, TV Movie): Juliette Laurier
- Murder Most Likely (1999): Marie Cartier
- Largo Winch (2003)
- Birdsong (2012): Jeanne
- Jack Ryan (2018): Sandrine Arnaud
