= Woman in Car =

2021 Canadian film

- Directed by: Vanya Rose
- Written by: Vanya Rose
- Produced by: Vanya Rose
- Starring: Hélène Joy; Anthony Lemke; Liane Balaban
- Cinematography: Glauco Bermudez
- Edited by: Jacquelyn Mills; Lucas Villegas
- Music by: Simon Angell; Erika Angell
- Production company: Time's Thievish Progress to Eternity Films
- Distributed by: Indiecan Entertainment
- Release date: March 20, 2021 (Cinequest)
- Running time: 109 minutes
- Country: Canada
- Language: English

Woman in Car is a 2021 Canadian psychological thriller film, written, produced, and directed by Vanya Rose. The film stars Hélène Joy as Anne, a former archer and the fiancée / trophy wife to be of wealthy businessman, David (Anthony Lemke), this to be her second marriage. Her first husband died under vague circumstances, an alleged hit-and-run. Anne feels threatened and lapses into obsession when her stepson Owen (Aidan Ritchie) brings home his new girlfriend Safiye (Liane Balaban) for the first time.

The film entered production in 2019.

The film premiered in March 2021 at the Cinequest Film & Creativity Festival, and had its Canadian premiere as part of the 2021 Canadian Film Festival.

== Awards ==
Simon and Erika Angell of the indie pop band Thus Owls received a Canadian Screen Award nomination for Best Original Song at the 10th Canadian Screen Awards in 2022, for their song "Lovers Are Falling".
