= Here's to Life! =

- Directed by: Arne Olsen
- Written by: Arne Olsen
- Produced by: William Vince
- Starring: Eric McCormack; James Whitmore; Kim Hunter; Ossie Davis
- Cinematography: David Geddes
- Edited by: Lisa Binkley
- Music by: Patric Caird
- Release date: 18 September 2000 (VIFF)
- Running time: 94 minutes
- Country: Canada
- Language: English

Here's to Life! is a 2000 Canadian comedy-drama film written and directed by Arne Olsen. It was the last theatrical feature for Academy Award winning actress Kim Hunter.

== Plot ==
The film stars Eric McCormack as Owen Rinard, an uptight retirement home administrator in Spokane, who is caught cheating on the company's taxes by a resident, and is blackmailed into taking Gus (James Whitmore), Nelly (Kim Hunter), and Duncan (Ossie Davis) on a trip to Victoria, British Columbia, so that each can experience a long-held dream: Gus wants to go salmon fishing in the Pacific Ocean; Nelly, a former music teacher, wants to attend the symphony; and Duncan, a retired boxer, wants to attend a highly anticipated prize fight in Vancouver. Owen himself, in turn, meets and connects romantically with Carley (Marya Delver), an employee in the hotel casino.

== Production ==
The film's original working title was Old Hats. It was filmed in Victoria in the summer of 1999.

The film's score was composed by Patric Caird. It also included several original songs by Michael Bublé, several years before he rose to international fame.

== Reception ==
=== Critical response ===
In The Globe and Mail, Ray Conlogue wrote that Whitmore, Hunter, and Davis kept the movie watchable, but concluded that "Here's to Life starts briskly, develops shakily and finishes preposterously. Only those who have been really rotten to their aged parents should see this movie, and then only by way of expiation." Ken Eisner of Variety called it a "by-the-numbers heartwarmer" which had the potential to be modestly successful among older audiences, but was likely to play better on television than in a theatre.

=== Awards ===
The film garnered eight Genie Award nominations at the 21st Genie Awards in 2001:

- Best Actor: James Whitmore
- Best Actress: Kim Hunter
- Best Costume Design: Patricia Hargreaves
- Best Sound: Bill Sheppard, Mark Berger and Ruth Huddleston
- Best Sound Editing: Dean Giammarco, Maija Burnett, Kris Fenske, John Ludgate and Brendan Ostrander
- Best Original Song: Michael Bublé, "Dumb Ol' Heart" and "I've Never Been in Love Before"
- Best Original Score: Patric Caird

Out of the eight nominations, the film won one Genie Award, for best score.
