= Jean-Nicolas Verreault =

Jean-Nicolas Verreault (born August 28, 1967) is a Canadian actor from Quebec. He is most noted for his starring role as Evian in the 2000 film Maelström, for which he was a Genie Award nominee for Best Supporting Actor at the 21st Genie Awards in 2001.

He was also a Prix Gémeaux winner for Best Actor in a Dramatic Series or Program for his performance as Steve in the television series Je voudrais qu'on m'efface. Verreault starred in TV series Aller Simple (2022–2023).
