= Sophie Lorain =

Canadian actress

- Born: Sophie-Hélène Lorain; 20 November 1957 (age 68); Montreal, Quebec, Canada
- Occupations: Actress, director, producer
- Years active: 1974-present
- Spouse: Alexis Durand-Brault
- Parent(s): Jacques Lorain; Denise Filiatrault

Sophie Lorain (born Sophie-Hélène Lorain; 20 November 1957) is a French-Canadian actress, director and producer. She is known for having played Anne Fortier in the highly rated television series Fortier that first aired in Quebec, Canada. She is the daughter of actors Jacques Lorain and Denise Filiatrault. Her sister is French-Canadian actress Danièle Lorain.

In addition to her work as an actress, she has directed the films Heat Wave (Les grandes chaleurs) and Slut in a Good Way (Charlotte a du fun), as well as episodes of the television series La galère and Nouvelle adresse.

She is married to director and cinematographer Alexis Durand-Brault.

== Awards ==
- Gémeaux Award—Best Actress in a Dramatic Series (2000 - Fortier)
- Gémeaux Award—Best Supporting Actress (1996 - Omertà: The Code of Silence)

== Filmography ==
=== Film ===
Year	Title	Role	Notes
1974	Once Upon a Time in the East (Il était une fois dans l'est)	Francine	
1982	Scandale	Lucille	
1993	Women in Love (Les Amoureuses)	Hélène	
1998	It's Your Turn, Laura Cadieux (C't'à ton tour, Laura Cadieux)	Madame Tardif	
1998	In Her Defense	Debra Turner	
1998	Home Team	Karen	
1999	Who Gets the House?	Rebecca Reece	
2000	Stardom	Italasia Reporter	
2002	Alice's Odyssey (L'Odysée d'Alice Tremblay)	Alice Tremblay	
2003	Mambo Italiano	Pina Lunetti	
2003	The Barbarian Invasions (Les Invasions barbares)	First Lover	
2005	Maman Last Call	Alice Malenfant	
2012	Before My Heart Falls (Avant que mon cœur bascule)	Françoise	
2020	My Very Own Circus (Mon cirque à moi)	Patricia	
2023	Testament	Suzanne	

=== Television ===
Year	Title	Role	Notes
1979	Chez Denise	Michèle Dussault	
1984	Le 101, ouest, avenue des Pins	Michèle	
1991	Lance et Compte: Le crime de Lulu	Françoise Déry	
1991	Urban Angel	Sylvie Belanger	
1992	Scoop	Manon Berthiaume	
1996	Urgence	Hélène Cote	
1996–97	Omertà: The Code of Silence	Denise Deslongchamps	
1997	Loss of Faith	Beth Barker	
1998	Un hiver de tourmente	Claire/Adoption	
1998	Quai nº 1		
2000	Stardom		
2001	The Sign of Four	Mary Morstan	
2000–04	Fortier	Anne Fortier	(actress, associate producer)
2003	Le petit monde de Laura Cadieux		miniseries (co-producer)
2005	Sous les jaquettes		
2005	Miss Météo		
to appear 2006	Un homme mort		(director)
2006	La galère		(director of seven episodes)
2016	Au secours de Beatrice	Beatrice	
2021	Portrait-Robot	Maryse Ferron	also series creator
2021	Sortez-moi de moi	Clara St-Amand	also series creator
