= Thus Owls =

Swedish-Canadian experimental indie rock band

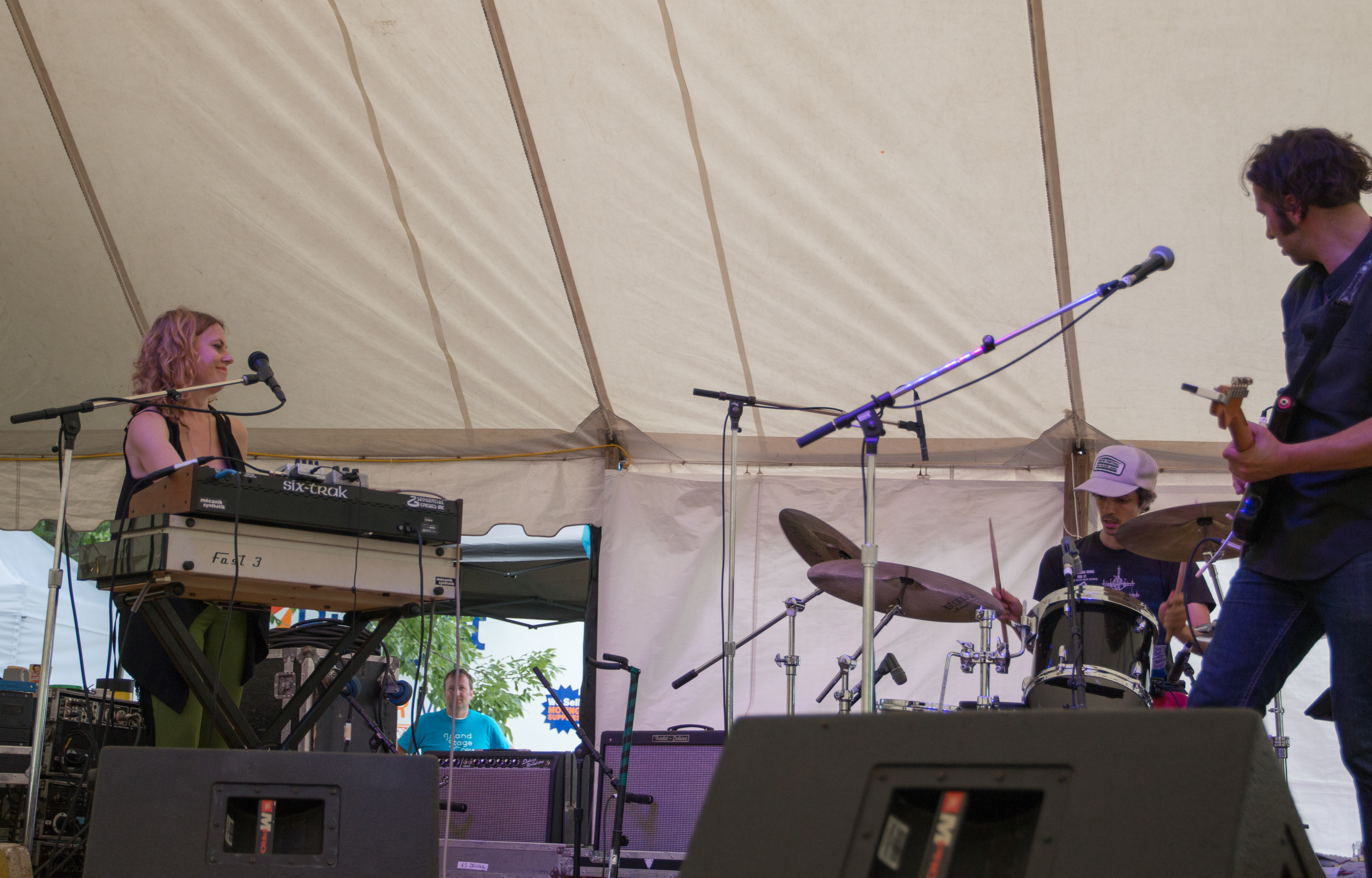
- Thus Owls performing at the 2015 Hillside Festival

Background information
- Origin: Montreal, Quebec, Canada
- Genre: Indie pop
- Years active: 2000s–present
- Label: Secret City Records
- Members: Simon Angell; Erika Angell
- Website: thusowls.com

Thus Owls is a Swedish-Canadian experimental indie rock band based in Montreal, Quebec, consisting of husband and wife duo Simon and Erika Angell, who are backed up at times by guest musicians.

== History ==
Prior to forming the duo, Simon Angell was a guitarist in Patrick Watson's band, while Erika Angell was based in Sweden, where she led bands Josef & Erika and The Moth and was backup vocalist for Loney, Dear.

Thus Owls formed as a four piece in 2007 when Erika Angell began collaborating with drummer Ola Hultgren, bassist Martin Höper, and pianist Cecilia Persson. She met Montrealer Simon Angell while they were both on tour in Amsterdam the same year and he joined the group.

The band released Cardiac Malformations in 2009. Cardiac Malformations was recorded by Oskar Lindberg during five days in the Svenska Grammofonstudion in Gothenburg, Sweden. The band toured frequently over the next two years in support of the album, mainly in Europe and parts of North America, playing with such bands as Patrick Watson, Karkwa, and Little Dragon. Simon Angell was also a contributor on Piano mal, the 2012 debut album by Julien Sagot.

The following album, Harbours, was released on January 23, 2013. Harbours was recorded at the La Frette studio in Paris, France.

Erika and Simon Angell subsequently moved to Montreal, and enlisted local drummer Stef Schneider and keyboard player Parker Shper to round out the permanent lineup alongside bassist Morgan Moore. Their third album, Turning Rocks, was released in 2014 on Secret City Records, and was a longlisted nominee for the 2014 Polaris Music Prize.

In 2017, the band performed in a Leonard Cohen tribute concert in Montreal. In 2018, they released their fourth album, The Mountain That We Live Upon. The Angells were accompanied on the album by guest musicians Laurel Sprengelmeyer, Nicolas Basque, Michael Feuerstack, Marc-André Landry, and Jason Sharp.

In 2022, Simon and Erika Angell received a Canadian Screen Award nomination for Best Original Song for "Lovers Are Falling", a song they contributed to the film Woman in Car.

== Discography ==
- Cardiac Malformations (2009)
- Harbours (2011)
- Turning Rocks (2014)
- Black Matter (EP) (2015)
- The Mountain That We Live Upon (2018)
- Who Would Hold You If the Sky Betrayed Us? (2022)
