= Alexis Durand-Brault =

Canadian cinematographer and film director

Alexis Durand-Brault is a Canadian cinematographer and film director. He is most noted for his 2017 film It's the Heart That Dies Last (C'est le cœur qui meurt en dernier), for which he received a Canadian Screen Award nomination for Best Director at the 6th Canadian Screen Awards.

He previously directed the films My Daughter, My Angel (Ma fille mon ange) and The Little Queen (La petite reine), and episodes of the television series La galère and Au secours de Béatrice. His credits as a cinematographer include the films Heat Wave (Les grandes chaleurs), Personal Distortion (Déformation personnelle), The Five of Us (Elles étaient cinq) and Slut in a Good Way (Charlotte a du fun).

He is married to actress and filmmaker Sophie Lorain, with whom he co-created the 2021 drama series Portrait-Robot and Sortez-moi de moi.

He directed the 2023 television series Mégantic.
