= Dominique Michel =

Canadian comedian, actress and singer (born 1932)

Dominique Michel OC, CQ
- Born: Aimée Sylvestre; September 24, 1932 (age 94); Sorel-Tracy, Quebec, Canada
- Occupations: Comedian, actress, singer
- Television: Moi et l'autre
- Spouse: Camille Henry (m. 1958; div. 1960)
- Awards: Governor General's Performing Arts Award (1992); Prix Gémeaux (1995)

Dominique Michel, OC, CQ (born Aimée Sylvestre; September 24, 1932 in Sorel-Tracy, Quebec) is a Quebec comedian, actress, singer and artist.

== Biography ==
She began her career in cabarets. In 1954, she met songwriter Raymond Lévesque who wrote Une petite Canadienne and La famille for her, the latter becoming her first hit recording. After returning to Quebec, she joined the "Beu qui rit" troupe and formed a comedy duo with actress Denise Filiatrault.

She began her television career at Radio-Canada in 1952 on Mes jeunes années and later co-hosted the popular variety program Le p'tit café from 1956 to 1962. Her first sitcom was Moi et l'autre, in which she co-starred with Denise Filiatrault. The show was an enormous success during its run from 1966 to 1972 and made Michel a household name in Quebec.

From 1977 to 1982, she had numerous leading roles in television programs such as Dominique, Chère Isabelle and Métro-boulot-dodo.

Michel's first film role was in Hold on to Daddy's Ears (Tiens-toi bien après les oreilles à papa) with Yvon Deschamps in 1971. She played for cineast Denys Arcand in two movies well known outside of Quebec: The Decline of the American Empire (Le Déclin de l'empire américain) and its sequel The Barbarian Invasions (Les Invasions barbares).

She notably co-starred with Daniel Lemire and has hosted the Festival Juste pour rire multiple times. Michel also showed her multiple comedic talents in the year-end review show Bye Bye from Radio-Canada in which she would do multiple impressions on top of hosting the 90 minutes special.

In 1992, Michel received the Governor General's Performing Arts Award for Lifetime Artistic Achievement in broadcasting. In 1994, she was made an Officer of the Order of Canada "for her encouragement of humour and her contribution to the cultural life of the country." In 2002, she was made a Knight of the National Order of Quebec. In 1995, she received, jointly with Denise Filiatrault, the Grand Prix Gémeau from l'Académie canadienne du cinéma et de la télévision for lifetime achievements.

== Personal life ==
She has been married only once in 1958 to New York Rangers all star Camille Henry but later divorced in 1960.

In June 2010, at age 77, Michel was diagnosed with colon cancer and underwent surgery at Hôpital Maisonneuve-Rosemont. She subsequently underwent chemotherapy and was later reported to be in remission.

== Selected filmography ==
=== Movies ===
- Hold on to Daddy's Ears (Tiens-toi bien après les oreilles à papa) - 1971
- Enuff Is Enuff (J'ai mon voyage!) - 1973
- There's Always a Way to Find a Way (Y'a toujours moyen de moyenner!) - 1973
- Les aventures d'une jeune veuve - 1974
- Far from You Sweetheart (Je suis loin de toi mignonne) - 1976
- The Crime of Ovide Plouffe (Le Crime d'Ovide Plouffe) - 1984
- The Decline of the American Empire (Le Déclin de l'empire américain) - 1986
- Night Zoo (Un zoo la nuit) - 1987
- Louis 19, King of the Airwaves (Louis 19, le roi des ondes) - 1994
- Laura Cadieux II (Laura Cadieux...la suite) - 1999
- The Barbarian Invasions (Les Invasions barbares) - 2003

=== Television ===
- Moi et l'autre (from 1966 to 1972)
- Dominique (from 1977 to 1979)
- Chère Isabelle (1976)
- Métro-boulot-dodo (1982)
- The Mills of Power (Les Tisserands du pouvoir) - 1988
- Montréal, ville ouverte (1992)
- Catherine (from 1999 to 2003)
- Virginie (from 2004 to 2005)
