= Hold on to Daddy's Ears =

1971 Canadian film

- French: Tiens-toi bien après les oreilles à papa
- Directed by: Jean Bissonnette
- Written by: Gilles Richer
- Produced by: Richard Hellman
- Starring: Dominique Michel; Yvon Deschamps; Dave Broadfoot
- Cinematography: René Verzier
- Edited by: Pierre Savard
- Music by: François Dompierre
- Production companies: Mojack Films; Briston Creative Films
- Distributed by: Ciné-Art
- Release date: December 25, 1971
- Running time: 103 minutes
- Country: Canada
- Language: French

Hold on to Daddy's Ears (French: Tiens-toi bien après les oreilles à papa), also known as What the Hell Are They Complaining About?, is a Canadian comedy film, directed by Jean Bissonnette and released in 1971. A satirical allegory for Quebec nationalism, the film stars Dominique Michel as Suzanne David and Yvon Deschamps as Jacques Martin, two French Canadians working for the Montreal office of a large English Canadian insurance company from Toronto.

The cast also includes Dave Broadfoot as the company president Mr. Thompson, as well as Paule Bayard, Gilles Latulippe, Jean Leclerc, Hélène Loiselle, Suzanne Lévesque, Alpha Boucher and Claude Michaud in supporting roles.

== Release ==
The film premiered in limited release in Montreal on December 25, 1971. It was an immediate popular success, grossing over $600,000 in eight weeks across just five theatres; it received broader theatrical release across Quebec in 1972, ultimately grossing over $2 million across its entire theatrical run.

== Legacy ==
Screenwriter Gilles Richer's next film, 1973's Enuff Is Enuff (J'ai mon voyage!) addressed similar themes and again starred Michel, but was not a sequel to Daddy's Ears.

In contemporary times, the film has also been analyzed as a precursor of the MeToo movement for its depiction of the sexist behaviour that Suzanne was forced to endure in the workplace.

A key scene in the film, in which Suzanne and Jacques are forced to pray the rosary in both English and French simultaneously, is considered one of the classic scenes in the cinema of Quebec.

The song "Mommy Daddy", written by Richer and songwriter Marc Gélinas and performed by Michel and Gélinas for the film's soundtrack, was a hit, which became one of Michel's enduring signature songs and was inducted into the Canadian Songwriters Hall of Fame in 2014.
