= Escape from Atlantis (film) =

- Genre: Fantasy; Adventure; Comedy
- Written by: Arne Olsen
- Directed by: Strathford Hamilton
- Starring: Jeff Speakman; Tim Thomerson; Justin Burnette; Mercedes McNab; Breck Wilson
- Music by: Stephen Graziano
- Country of origin: United States
- Original language: English

Production
- Executive producers: Robert Harris; Jim Korris
- Producer: Jim Michaels
- Production location: Honolulu
- Cinematography: David Lewis
- Editor: Kert VanderMeulen
- Running time: 97 min.
- Production companies: D Vision; Harris Entertainment Inc. Starz! Pictures; Universal Television

Original release
- Network: Starz
- Release: March 29, 1997

Escape from Atlantis is a 1997 American made-for-TV adventure fantasy film, starring Jeff Speakman. It originally aired on Starz and was written by Arne Olsen and directed by Strathford Hamilton.

== Plot ==
A family falls into a time warp where they get into Atlantis, a place full of strange and magic creatures.

== Cast ==
- Jeff Speakman as Matt Spencer
- Tim Thomerson as Liam Gallagher
- Justin Burnette as Adam Spencer
- Mercedes McNab as Claudia Spencer
- Breck Wilson as Chris Spencer

== Reception ==
At-a-Glance Film Reviews gave the film a very bad review, stating: "I find myself at a loss for a compliment to pay this movie. If I had to muster one, I'd say that the photography of the island is often (but not always) quite beautiful. It's a nice thing to boast about, but as the movie's sole asset, it stinks."
