= Canadian Screen Award for Best Original Song =

- Country: Canada
- Presented by: Academy of Canadian Cinema & Television
- First award: 1982
- Currently held by: Jay McCarrol & Matt Johnson for "The Alphabet Song" from Nirvanna the Band the Show the Movie (2025)
- Website: academy.ca/awards

The Academy of Canadian Cinema and Television presents an annual award for Best Achievement in Music: Original Song to the best original song in a Canadian motion picture.

First presented at the 3rd Genie Awards in 1982, the award was presented as part of the Genie Awards until 2011. Since 2012, it has been presented as part of the Canadian Screen Awards.

== 1980s ==
Year	Nominees	Song	Film	Ref
1980; 1st Genie Awards
1980; 1st Genie Awards	No award presented			
1981; 2nd Genie Awards
1981; 2nd Genie Awards	No award presented			
1982; 3rd Genie Awards
1982; 3rd Genie Awards	Stéphane Venne	"Il était une fois des gens heureux"	The Plouffe Family (Les Plouffe)	
1982; 3rd Genie Awards	Ann Mortifee	"Gypsy Born"	Surfacing	
1982; 3rd Genie Awards	Neil Young	"Comes a Time"	Silence of the North	
1983; 4th Genie Awards
1983; 4th Genie Awards	Burton Cummings	"You Saved My Soul"	Melanie	
1983; 4th Genie Awards	Claude Fonfrède, Raoul Duguay	"Le quéteux d'amour"	Wild Flowers (Les fleurs sauvages)	
1983; 4th Genie Awards	Réjean Marois, Fernand Dansereau	"Doux aveux"	Sweet Lies and Loving Oaths (Doux aveux)	
1983; 4th Genie Awards	Fred Mollin	"Just One Chance to Be Free"	Spring Fever	
1983; 4th Genie Awards	Luc Plamondon, Germain Gauthier	"Call Girl"	Scandale	
1983; 4th Genie Awards	Leslie Pouliot	"My Love for You"	Harry Tracy, Desperado	
1984; 5th Genie Awards
1984; 5th Genie Awards	Bo Harwood, Bobby Pollard	"Ups & Downs"	Ups and Downs	
1984; 5th Genie Awards	Jimmy Bond	"Feel It"	Just a Game (Rien qu'un jeu)	
1984; 5th Genie Awards	André Vincelli	"Talk About It"	A 20th Century Chocolate Cake	
1985; 6th Genie Awards
1985; 6th Genie Awards	Yves Laferrière, Marjolène Morin, Paule Baillargeon	"Touch Me"	A Woman in Transit (La Femme de l'hôtel)	
1985; 6th Genie Awards	Germain Gauthier, Robert Léger, Daniele Faubert	"L'Amour a pris son temps"	The Dog Who Stopped the War (La Guerre des tuques)	
1985; 6th Genie Awards	Betty Lazebnik, Charles Dennis	"A Little Piece of Forever"	Reno and the Doc	
1986; 7th Genie Awards
1986; 7th Genie Awards	Lewis Furey, Leonard Cohen	"Angel Eyes"	Night Magic	
1986; 7th Genie Awards	Lewis Furey, Leonard Cohen	"Fire"	Night Magic	
1986; 7th Genie Awards	Lewis Furey, Eddy Marney, Howard Foreman, Judy Richard	"Michael's Song"	The Peanut Butter Solution (Opération beurre de pinottes)	
1986; 7th Genie Awards	Michel Rivard	"Le temps nous dépasse"	Jacques and November (Jacques et novembre)	
1986; 7th Genie Awards	John Sebastian	"Nobody Cares Like a Bear"	The Care Bears Movie	
1987; 8th Genie Awards
1987; 8th Genie Awards	Gilles Vigneault	"Les îles de l'enfance"	Equinox (Équinoxe)	
1987; 8th Genie Awards	Danielle Messia	"De la main gauche"	Anne Trister	
1987; 8th Genie Awards	Note: Messia's "De la main gauche" had been named the original winner, but its award was later rescinded when the Academy belatedly discovered that the song had not been written for the film. Vigneault's song was named the new winner in June.			
1987; 8th Genie Awards	Robert Joy, Andy Jones	"Show Goin' On"	The Adventure of Faustus Bidgood	
1987; 8th Genie Awards	Peter Pringle, Kevin Hunter	"Cold As Ice"	Toby McTeague	
1987; 8th Genie Awards	Peter R. Simpson, Paul Zaza	"Out of the Fire"	Bullies	
1988; 9th Genie Awards
1988; 9th Genie Awards	Jean-Pierre Bonin, Daniel De Shaimes, Jean Corriveau, Robert Stanley	"Lost in a Hurricane"	Night Zoo (Un zoo la nuit)	
1988; 9th Genie Awards	William D. MacGillivray	"Mary's Lament"	Life Classes	
1988; 9th Genie Awards	Maribeth Solomon	"Rise and Shine"	The Care Bears Adventure in Wonderland	
1988; 9th Genie Awards	Guy Trépanier	"The Great Land of Small"	The Great Land of Small (C'est pas parce qu'on est petit qu'on peut pas être grand!)	
1988; 9th Genie Awards	Howard Forman, Krzesimir Dębski	"When We're Together"	The Young Magician (Le jeune magicien)	
1989; 10th Genie Awards
1989; 10th Genie Awards	Louis Natale, Anne Wheeler	"Cowboys Don't Cry"	Cowboys Don't Cry	
1989; 10th Genie Awards	Normand Dubé, Guy Trépanier, Nathalie Carson	"We Are the One"	The Tadpole and the Whale (La Grenouille et la baleine)	
1989; 10th Genie Awards	Louise Bennett	"You're Going Home"	Milk and Honey	
1989; 10th Genie Awards	Jay Gruska, Marc Jordan	"Shadow Dance"	Shadow Dancing	
1989; 10th Genie Awards	Rufus Wainwright	"I'm Running"	Tommy Tricker and the Stamp Traveller	

== 1990s ==
Year	Nominees	Song	Film	Ref
1990; 11th Genie Awards
1990; 11th Genie Awards	Bill Henderson	"When I Sing"	Bye Bye Blues	
1990; 11th Genie Awards	Claude Dubois, Dany Laferrière	"On vit de femmes"	How to Make Love to a Negro Without Getting Tired (Comment faire l'amour avec un nègre sans se fatiguer)	
1990; 11th Genie Awards	Colin Nairne, Barney Bentall, Gary Fraser	"Restless Dreamer"	American Boyfriends	
1990; 11th Genie Awards	Jane Siberry	"This Old Earth"	The Top of His Head	
1990; 11th Genie Awards	Maribeth Solomon	"The Best We Both Can Be"	Babar: The Movie	
1990; 11th Genie Awards	Maribeth Solomon	"Elephant March"	Babar: The Movie	
1991; 12th Genie Awards
1991; 12th Genie Awards	George Blondheim, Anne Wheeler	"Such Magic"	Angel Square	
1991; 12th Genie Awards	Rémy Girard, Claire Wojas	"C'est plus fort que nous"	Love Crazy (Amoureux fou)	
1991; 12th Genie Awards	Daniel Lavoie, Jean Pierre Lefebvre	"Quand tu partiras"	The Fabulous Voyage of the Angel (Le fabuleux voyage de l'ange)	
1991; 12th Genie Awards	Patricia Rozema, Mark Korven	"A Certain Slant of Light"	White Room	
1991; 12th Genie Awards	Patricia Rozema, Mark Korven	"Hello I'm Nobody"	White Room	
1992; 13th Genie Awards
1992; 13th Genie Awards	Ron Hynes	"The Final Breath"	Secret Nation	
1992; 13th Genie Awards	Cam Wagner	"Midnight Ride"	North of Pittsburgh	
1992; 13th Genie Awards	Gord Norris, Larry Harvey	"Oh What a Fool You Made of Me"	The Shower	
1993; 14th Genie Awards
1993; 14th Genie Awards	No award presented			
1994; 15th Genie Awards
1994; 15th Genie Awards	Rheostatics	"Claire"	Whale Music	
1994; 15th Genie Awards	Penny Anne Baker, Michael Conway Baker	"Far Away"	Savage Land	
1994; 15th Genie Awards	Brad Hayes, Ray Bonneville	"Say Those Things"	The Myth of the Male Orgasm	
1994; 15th Genie Awards	Rheostatics	"Song of Courtship"	Whale Music	
1994; 15th Genie Awards	Glenn Schellenberg, John Greyson	"Just Like Scheherazade"	Zero Patience	
1994; 15th Genie Awards	Shari Ulrich, Graeme Coleman, David Graff	"Every Road"	Max	
1995; 16th Genie Awards
1995; 16th Genie Awards	No award presented			
1996; 17th Genie Awards
1996; 17th Genie Awards	Michael Turner, Swamp Baby, Peter J. Moore	"Who the Hell Do You Think You Are?"	Hard Core Logo	
1996; 17th Genie Awards	Steven Drake, Bruce McCulloch, Craig Northey	"Some Days It's Dark"	Kids in the Hall: Brain Candy	
1996; 17th Genie Awards	Michael Timmins	"House on the Horizon"	House	
1997; 18th Genie Awards
1997; 18th Genie Awards	Luc Plamondon, François Dompierre	"L'Homme idéal"	The Ideal Man (L'Homme idéal)	
1997; 18th Genie Awards	Mychael Danna, Sarah Polley	"The Sweet Hereafter"	The Sweet Hereafter	
1997; 18th Genie Awards	Kristy Thirsk	"Bounds of Love"	Kissed	
1998; 19th Genie Awards
1998; 19th Genie Awards	Suzie Ungerleider	"River Blue"	The Fishing Trip	
1998; 19th Genie Awards	Daniel Lavoie, Claude Gauthier	"Est-ce si loin Québec"	Now or Never (Aujourd'hui ou jamais)	
1998; 19th Genie Awards	Michel Tremblay, François Dompierre	"Laura la Belle"	It's Your Turn, Laura Cadieux (C't'à ton tour, Laura Cadieux)	
1999; 20th Genie Awards
1999; 20th Genie Awards	Peter Luciano, Glenn Coulson, Joe Heslip, Marty Beecroft	"One Thing to Say"	Jacob Two Two Meets the Hooded Fang	
1999; 20th Genie Awards	Daniel Bélanger	"Le Dernier souffle"	The Last Breath (Le Dernier souffle)	
1999; 20th Genie Awards	Tim Burns	"It's a Treat to be a Creep"	Jacob Two Two Meets the Hooded Fang	
1999; 20th Genie Awards	John Wesley Chisholm	"Beefcake"	Beefcake	
1999; 20th Genie Awards	Benoit Jutras, René Dupéré	"Alegría"	Alegría	

== 2000s ==
Year	Nominees	Song	Film	Ref
2000; 21st Genie Awards
2000; 21st Genie Awards	François Dompierre	"Fortuna"	Laura Cadieux II (Laura Cadieux...la suite)	
2000; 21st Genie Awards	Michael Bublé	"Dumb Ol' Heart"	Here's to Life!	
2000; 21st Genie Awards	Michael Bublé	"I've Never Been in Love Before"	Here's to Life!	
2000; 21st Genie Awards	Lascelles Stephens, Keith Andes, Deborah Cox	"29"	Love Come Down	
2000; 21st Genie Awards	Lascelles Stephens, Keith Andes, Deborah Cox	"Our Love"	Love Come Down	
2001; 22nd Genie Awards
2001; 22nd Genie Awards	Ron Sexsmith	"Love Is Free"	The Art of Woo	
2001; 22nd Genie Awards	Simon Kendall, Tom Landa, Geoffrey Kelly	"Parting Glass"	Lunch with Charles	
2001; 22nd Genie Awards	Chantal Kreviazuk, Raine Maida	"Can't Make It Good"	Century Hotel	
2001; 22nd Genie Awards	James McGrath, Joel Feeney	"Falling Forward"	Treed Murray	
2001; 22nd Genie Awards	Osvaldo Montes	"La niebla del tiempo"	On Your Head (Le Ciel sur la tête)	
2002; 23rd Genie Awards
2002; 23rd Genie Awards	Carlos Lopes	"Com Estas Asas"	Saint Monica	
2002; 23rd Genie Awards	Laura Doyle	"Let You Go"	Suddenly Naked	
2002; 23rd Genie Awards	Laura Doyle	"Your Love"	Suddenly Naked	
2002; 23rd Genie Awards	Mel M'Rabet	"Ab (Father)"	Khaled	
2002; 23rd Genie Awards	Michael Shields	"Just Say Goodbye"	Turning Paige	
2003; 24th Genie Awards
2003; 24th Genie Awards	Ken Whiteley	"Tell Me"	Falling Angels	
2003; 24th Genie Awards	Adam James Broughton, Jeanne Dompierre, Steve Galluccio, FM Le Sieur	"Montréal Italiano"	Mambo Italiano	
2003; 24th Genie Awards	Pamela Phillips-Oland, David Martin, LeVar Burton	"Center of My Heart"	Blizzard	
2003; 24th Genie Awards	Luc Plamondon, Michel Cusson	"Depuis le premier jour"	Séraphin: Heart of Stone (Séraphin: un homme et son péché)	
2003; 24th Genie Awards	Brian C. Warren, Mark Anthony	"La Vie"	Saved by the Belles	
2004; 25th Genie Awards
2004; 25th Genie Awards	Jacob Tierney, Ron Proulx	"Pantaloon in Black"	Twist	
2004; 25th Genie Awards	Pierre Houle, Lorraine Richard, Michel Cusson	"Le Blues de Monica"	Machine Gun Molly (Monica la mitraille)	
2004; 25th Genie Awards	Rebecca Jenkins	"Something's Coming"	Wilby Wonderful	
2004; 25th Genie Awards	Kyprios	"Ignorance Is Beautiful (Help Me)"	Childstar	
2004; 25th Genie Awards	Luc Plamondon, Patrick Doyle	"Ma Nouvelle France"	Battle of the Brave (Nouvelle-France)	
2005; 26th Genie Awards
2005; 26th Genie Awards	Glenn Buhr, Margaret Sweatman	"When Wintertime"	Seven Times Lucky	
2005; 26th Genie Awards	Daniel Bélanger	"Tourner"	Audition (L'Audition)	
2005; 26th Genie Awards	Sylvain Cossette, Robert Marchand, Michel Corriveau	"Comme un plume au vent"	The Outlander (Le Survenant)	
2005; 26th Genie Awards	Matt Murphy, Michael Mabbott	"Just a Show"	The Life and Hard Times of Guy Terrifico	
2005; 26th Genie Awards	Matt Murphy, Michael Mabbott	"Make Believe"	The Life and Hard Times of Guy Terrifico	
2006; 27th Genie Awards
2006; 27th Genie Awards	Jennifer Kreisberg	"Have Hope"	Unnatural & Accidental	
2006; 27th Genie Awards	Dan Bigras	"L'Astronaute"	Angel's Rage (La Rage de l'ange)	
2006; 27th Genie Awards	Eric Lapointe, Stéphane Dufour, Jamil	"Tattoo"	Bon Cop, Bad Cop	
2006; 27th Genie Awards	Bramwell Tovey, Richard Bell	"In a Heartbeat"	Eighteen	
2006; 27th Genie Awards	Patrick Watson, Caroline Dhavernas	"Trace-moi"	The Beautiful Beast (La belle bête)	
2007; 28th Genie Awards
2007; 28th Genie Awards	Valanga Khoza, David Hirschfelder	"Kaya"	Shake Hands with the Devil	
2007; 28th Genie Awards	Alan Doyle	"Young Triffie's Been Made Away With"	Young Triffie	
2007; 28th Genie Awards	Byron Wong, Luke Nicholson	"Breathe"	Poor Boy's Game	
2008; 29th Genie Awards
2008; 29th Genie Awards	Dr. Shiva	"Rahi Nagufta"	Amal	
2008; 29th Genie Awards	Loco Locass	"M'Accrocher?"	Everything Is Fine (Tout est parfait)	
2008; 29th Genie Awards	Bry Webb	"Big Smoke"	This Beautiful City	
2009; 30th Genie Awards
2009; 30th Genie Awards	John Welsman, Cherie Camp	"Oh Love"	Nurse.Fighter.Boy	
2009; 30th Genie Awards	Susan Avingaq	"Pamani"	Before Tomorrow (Le jour avant le lendemain)	
2009; 30th Genie Awards	Sari Dajani, Iohann Martin, Rudy Toussaint, John Von Aichlinger	"Bon Swa"	Heat Wave (Les grandes chaleurs)	

== 2010s ==
Year	Nominees	Song	Films	Ref
2010; 31st Genie Awards
2010; 31st Genie Awards	Mary Milne	"Already Gone"	The Trotsky	
2010; 31st Genie Awards	Buck 65	"What's Wrong with That?"	Year of the Carnivore	
2010; 31st Genie Awards	Cherie Pyne, Matthew J. Thomson	"Tender Steps"	Crackie	
2010; 31st Genie Awards	Mark Sasso, Casey Laforet, Stephen Pitkin	"West End Sky"	Grown Up Movie Star	
2010; 31st Genie Awards	Paul Spence	"There's No Place Like Christmas"	FUBAR 2	
2011; 32nd Genie Awards
2011; 32nd Genie Awards	Carole Facal	"Quelque part"	Starbuck	
2011; 32nd Genie Awards	Jay Brannan	"My Love My Love"	Cloudburst	
2011; 32nd Genie Awards	Malajube	"Œil pour œil"	Good Neighbours	
2011; 32nd Genie Awards	Steven Page	"A Different Sort of Solitude"	French Immersion	
2011; 32nd Genie Awards	Jean Robitaille, Steve Galluccio	"Waiting for Your Touch"	Funkytown	
2012; 1st Canadian Screen Awards
2012; 1st Canadian Screen Awards	Emily Haines, James Shaw, Howard Shore	"Long to Live"	Cosmopolis	
2012; 1st Canadian Screen Awards	Erland and the Carnival	"Out of Sight"	Rufus	
2012; 1st Canadian Screen Awards	Erland and the Carnival	"Wanting"	Rufus	
2013; 2nd Canadian Screen Awards
2013; 2nd Canadian Screen Awards	Jimmy Harry, Serena Ryder	"It's No Mistake"	The Right Kind of Wrong	
2013; 2nd Canadian Screen Awards	Michel Cusson	"À la claire fontaine"	The Storm Within (Rouge sang)	
2013; 2nd Canadian Screen Awards	Maerin Hunting	"Iva/Moses"	Stay	
2013; 2nd Canadian Screen Awards	Elisapie Isaac	"Far Away"	The Legend of Sarila	
2013; 2nd Canadian Screen Awards	Colleen Rennison	"Molly"	Down River	
2014; 3rd Canadian Screen Awards
2014; 3rd Canadian Screen Awards	Manjeet Ral	"Dal Makhani"	Dr. Cabbie	
2014; 3rd Canadian Screen Awards	Patric Caird, Sonya Côté	"Danse Elegant"	Tru Love	
2014; 3rd Canadian Screen Awards	Lewis Furey	"Road to Rainbow's End"	Love Project	
2014; 3rd Canadian Screen Awards	Ian LeFeuvre	"The Whisper in Me"	Dirty Singles	
2014; 3rd Canadian Screen Awards	Dan Mangan	"Wants"	The Valley Below	
2015; 4th Canadian Screen Awards
2015; 4th Canadian Screen Awards	Jenny Salgado	"C'est aujourd'hui que je sors"	Scratch	
2015; 4th Canadian Screen Awards	Kris Elgstrand	"Asshole Dave"	Songs She Wrote About People She Knows	
2015; 4th Canadian Screen Awards	Peter Katz and Karen Kowsowski	"Where the Light Used to Be"	88	
2015; 4th Canadian Screen Awards	Martin Léon	"Red and Yellow"	Our Loved Ones (Les Êtres chers)	
2015; 4th Canadian Screen Awards	Noah Reid	"People Hold On"	People Hold On	
2016; 5th Canadian Screen Awards
2016; 5th Canadian Screen Awards	David Braid	"Could Have Been"	Born to Be Blue	
2016; 5th Canadian Screen Awards	Nikan Boivin	"Sokecimyekw"	Before the Streets (Avant les rues)	
2016; 5th Canadian Screen Awards	Camille Poliquin and Laurence Lafond-Beaulne	"Natalie"	King Dave	
2016; 5th Canadian Screen Awards	Matthew Schellenberg	"Draw Blood"	Lovesick	
2016; 5th Canadian Screen Awards	Daniel Stimac	"Almost Had It All"	A Date with Miss Fortune	
2017; 6th Canadian Screen Awards
2017; 6th Canadian Screen Awards	Qais Essar, Joshua Hill	"The Crown Sleeps"	The Breadwinner	
2017; 6th Canadian Screen Awards	Dani Bailey	"Rid the Dark"	Hunting Pignut	
2017; 6th Canadian Screen Awards	Joey Sherrett, Chris Gordon, Nathaniel Huskinson	"CTS Thief"	Boost	
2018; 7th Canadian Screen Awards
2018; 7th Canadian Screen Awards	Dan General, Thomas Lambe, Adam Tanuyak	"Trials"	The Grizzlies	
2018; 7th Canadian Screen Awards	Sook-Yin Lee, Adam Litovitz, Alia O'Brien	"Ghost of Love (Onakabazien Remix)"	Octavio Is Dead!	
2018; 7th Canadian Screen Awards	Jean-Sébastien Williams	"Help Is on the Way"	Sashinka	
2019; 8th Canadian Screen Awards
2019; 8th Canadian Screen Awards	Howard Shore	"The Song of Names (Cantor Prayer)"	The Song of Names	
2019; 8th Canadian Screen Awards	Peter Chapman, Leslie Seaforth	"We Run the World"	Riot Girls	
2019; 8th Canadian Screen Awards	Ian LeFeuvre	"Travel Through"	James vs. His Future Self	
2019; 8th Canadian Screen Awards	Bramwell Tovey, Richard Bell	"I've Got a Big One"	Brotherhood	

== 2020s ==
Year	Nominees	Song	Films	Ref
2020; 9th Canadian Screen Awards
2020; 9th Canadian Screen Awards	Marie-Hélène L. Delorme	"Timid Joyous Atrocious"	Sugar Daddy	
2020; 9th Canadian Screen Awards	Lowell Boland, Evan Bogart, Justin Gray	"Grey Singing in Auditorium"	Bloodthirsty	
2020; 9th Canadian Screen Awards	Hilario Durán	"El Milagro"	The Cuban	
2020; 9th Canadian Screen Awards	Hilario Durán	"Mambo in Dominante"	The Cuban	
2020; 9th Canadian Screen Awards	Ariane Moffatt	"Merci pour tout"	Thanks for Everything (Merci pour tout)	
2021; 10th Canadian Screen Awards
2021; 10th Canadian Screen Awards	Tika Simone, Casey Manierka-Quaile	"And Then We Don't"	Learn to Swim	
2021; 10th Canadian Screen Awards	Erika Angell, Simon Angell	"Lovers Are Falling"	Woman in Car	
2021; 10th Canadian Screen Awards	David Braid	"Ring Them Fantasy"	Delia's Gone	
2021; 10th Canadian Screen Awards	Nicolas Errèra, Craig Walker	"Drop the Rock"	Goodbye Happiness (Au revoir le bonheur)	
2021; 10th Canadian Screen Awards	Jean Martin, Tanya Tagaq	"Surface Nord"	Bootlegger	
2022; 11th Canadian Screen Awards
2022; 11th Canadian Screen Awards	Kate Hewlett	"The Swearing Song"	The Swearing Jar	
2022; 11th Canadian Screen Awards	Chuck Baker, Tony Burgess	"The Ascension Song"	Cult Hero	
2022; 11th Canadian Screen Awards	Marie Clements, Wayne Lavallee, Jesse Zubot	"You Are My Bones"	Bones of Crows	
2022; 11th Canadian Screen Awards	Rose Cousins, Breagh Isabel	"Get Home"	Dawn, Her Dad and the Tractor	
2022; 11th Canadian Screen Awards	Ian LeFeuvre	"The Weight"	Ashgrove	
2023; 12th Canadian Screen Awards
2023; 12th Canadian Screen Awards	Qurram Hussain	"Ishq Ki Na Koi Bhi Hud Hai"	The Queen of My Dreams	
2023; 12th Canadian Screen Awards	Kamel Bushnaq, Ashley Jane, Suad Bushnaq	"I Won't Break"	Queen Tut	
2023; 12th Canadian Screen Awards	Suad Bushnaq, Omar El-Deeb	"Chez Habibi (Kul illi Batmannah)"	Queen Tut	
2023; 12th Canadian Screen Awards	Melissa D'Agostino, David Brock, Rebecca Everett	"Mothers and Daughters, Daughters and Moms"	Mother of All Shows	
2023; 12th Canadian Screen Awards	Lawrence Gowan	"Zombie Hideout"	Zombie Town	
2024; 13th Canadian Screen Awards
2024; 13th Canadian Screen Awards	Torquil Campbell	"Revolutionary Heart"	We Forgot to Break Up	
2024; 13th Canadian Screen Awards	Mark Clennon	"I Don't Know Who You Are"	I Don't Know Who You Are	
2024; 13th Canadian Screen Awards	Paul Spence, Michael Phillip Heppner, Ian Kerr Wilson, Guillaume Marc Antoine Tremblay, Stan Pietrusik	"The Power of the Tribe"	Deaner '89	
2025; 14th Canadian Screen Awards
2025; 14th Canadian Screen Awards	Jay McCarrol, Matt Johnson	"The Alphabet Song"	Nirvanna the Band the Show the Movie	
2025; 14th Canadian Screen Awards	Brent Bodrug, Julian Stirpe, Siobhan Bodrug	"Wildflower"	Dream Eater	
2025; 14th Canadian Screen Awards	David Carriere, Jane Penny	"A/S/L"	Mile End Kicks	

== See also ==
- Prix Iris for Best Original Music
