= Love Come Down (film) =

- Directed by: Clement Virgo
- Written by: Clement Virgo
- Produced by: Damon D'Oliveira; Eric Jordan; Clement Virgo
- Starring: Larenz Tate; Martin Cummins; Deborah Cox; Jennifer Dale; Kenneth Welsh; Sarah Polley; Clark Johnson; Peter Williams
- Cinematography: Dylan Macleod
- Music by: Aaron Davis John Lang
- Release date: 2000
- Running time: 99 minutes
- Country: Canada
- Language: English

Love Come Down is a 2000 Canadian drama film. Written and directed by Clement Virgo, the film stars Larenz Tate as Neville Carter, an aspiring comedian trying to rebuild his life after a stint in a drug rehabilitation centre.

The film was created in part as an expansion of Virgo's early short film Save My Lost Nigga Soul.

Neville's only family is his white half-brother Matthew (Martin Cummins), a professional boxer who has trouble communicating his feelings; their mother Olive (Barbara Williams) is in prison for murdering Neville's father Dean (played by Peter Williams in flashbacks) ten years earlier.

Deborah Cox also stars as Niko, a nightclub singer who is herself the adopted daughter of white parents (Jennifer Dale and Kenneth Welsh), with whom Neville enters a romantic relationship, and Sarah Polley appears as Sarah, a streetwise nun who works at the drug counselling centre. The cast also includes Kenny Robinson, Travis Kyle Davis and Charles Officer.

The film garnered eight Genie Award nominations at the 21st Genie Awards, including Best Motion Picture, Best Supporting Actor (Cummins), Best Supporting Actress (Williams), Best Screenplay, Best Overall Sound, Best Sound Editing, Best Original Song ("29" and "Our Love", by Cox, Keith Andes and Lascelles Stephens) and Best Original Score (Aaron Davis and John Lang). It won the awards for sound, sound editing and supporting actor.
