= Moi et l'autre =

Television series

- Also known as: Moi... et l'autre
- Genre: Sitcom
- Created by: Roger Garand; Gilles Richer
- Written by: Gilles Richer; Gil Courtemanche; Gilles Gougeon; Roger Garand; Gérald Tassé
- Directed by: Jean Bissonnette; Roger Fournier
- Starring: Denise Filiatrault; Dominique Michel
- Theme music composer: Roger Joubert
- Country of origin: Canada
- Original language: French
- No. of seasons: 5
- No. of episodes: 187

Production
- Running time: 30 minutes each
- Production companies: Radio-Canada (original); Avanti Ciné-Vidéo Inc. (revival)

Original release
- Network: Radio-Canada
- Release: 1966 – 1971

Moi et l'autre (also rendered as Moi... et l'autre) is a Quebec French sitcom broadcast on Radio-Canada between 1966 and 1971. The series starred Denise Filiatrault and Dominique Michel as best friends who were roommates at a Montreal apartment. The series tells of the ladies' numerous, often absurd, adventures, often with Denise as the perpetrator.

Moi et l'autre was Radio-Canada's first program to be broadcast in colour, after colourcasting began in Canada in 1966; however, some episodes of this series exist today only as black and white recordings.

From 1995 to 1997, a revival series was broadcast on Radio-Canada; the new series was written by Filiatrault and featured the same cast as the original series, except for Jean-Paul Dugas (who did not participate) and Réal Béland (who died in 1983; his role was played by Martin Drainville as Gustave Jr.).

== Cast ==
- Denise Filiatrault -- Denise Létourneau
- Dominique Michel -- Dominique André
- Roger Joubert -- M. Jean-Paul Lavigueur, building manager
- Réal Béland -- Gustave Landreville, doorman
- Jean-Paul Dugas -- François Dupuis, Dominique's boyfriend (1969-1971)
