= Martin Drainville =

Canadian actor/comedian

Martin Drainville (born August 21, 1964) is a Canadian film and television actor and comedian from Quebec. He is best known for his role in the film Louis 19, le roi des ondes, for which he received a Genie Award nomination for Best Actor at the 15th Genie Awards in 1994.

== Career ==
Drainville appeared in the films Nelligan, The Ideal Man (L'Homme idéal), It's Your Turn, Laura Cadieux (C't'à ton tour, Laura Cadieux), The Score and Alice's Odyssey (L'Odyssée d'Alice Tremblay), and the television series Million Dollar Babies, Scoop, Caméra Café, Lol:-), Moi et l'autre, Série noire, Piment Fort and Entre deux draps.

From 1995 to 1998, he also hosted the French-Canadian version of the then-popular children's television game show Where in the World is Carmen Sandiego?, playing the role of "ACME Special/Senior Agent in Charge of Training New Recruits" (played by Greg Lee in the American version).

== Filmography ==
=== Film ===
Year	Title	Role	Notes
1989	Lessons on Life (Trois pommes à côté du sommeil)	Autostoppeur	
1990	Ding et Dong (Ding et Dong, le film)	Livreur Dong	
1991	Nelligan	Albert Ferland	
1991	Montreal Stories (Montréal vu par...)	Desfossés	
1993	La Florida	Rheaume Lariviere	
1994	Louis 19, King of the Airwaves (Louis 19, le roi des ondes)	Louis Jobin	
1996	Angelo, Frédo et Roméo	Frédo / Wonton	
1996	L'Homme idéal	Gabor	
1998	It's Your Turn, Laura Cadieux (C't'à ton tour, Laura Cadieux)	Albert	
1999	Laura Cadieux II (Laura Cadieux...la suite)	Albert	
2001	The Score	Jean-Claude	
2002	Alice's Odyssey (L'Odyssée d'Alice Tremblay)	Ludovic / Louis	
2023	Katak: The Brave Beluga (Katak, le brave béluga)	Scoop	French version
2025	Compulsive Liar 2 (Menteuse)	Paul	

=== Television ===
Year	Title	Role	Notes
1992	Scoop	Richard Fortin	13 episodes
1993	Scoop II	Richard Fortin	13 episodes
1994	Scoop III	Richard Fortin	13 episodes
1994	Million Dollar Babies	Clovis Dionne	2 episodes
1995	Scoop IV	Richard Fortin	13 episodes
1995, 1996	La Petite Vie	Un astrophysicien / Gérard-Marie	2 episodes
2006–2008	Caméra Café	Guy Bérard	15 episodes
2007	Dieu merci!	Employeur dans une quincaillerie	Episode #1.1
2008	Les Boys	Jack the Bat	Episode #1.14
2011	Lol:-)	Various	12 episodes
2014–2016	Série noire	Bruno / Yvan	9 episodes
2019	Fragile	Patrick Provencher / Bazou	10 episodes
