= Voices in Public =

Voices in Public VIP
- Origin: Barrie, Ontario, Canada
- Genres: Pop
- Years active: 1996–2004
- Past members: Marty Beecroft; Glenn Coulson; Joe Heslip; Peter Luciano

Voices in Public (VIP for short) was a Canadian a capella boy band from Barrie, Ontario, consisting of Marty Beecroft, Glenn Coulson, Joe Heslip, and Peter Luciano.

== History ==
Voices in Public was formed in the late 1990s by Beecroft, Coulson and Heslip, three friends who attended high school in Barrie. They practised, wrote and arranged songs, and performed occasionally while completing their undergraduate degrees, and added Luciano to form a quartet.

V.I.P. were featured heavily in Disney's The Music Man (2002), alongside Matthew Broderick.

The four recorded their first album Do You Think You're Ready?, which led to a hit single, "It's Just My Luck", and two cross-Canada tours.

The band won the Best New Group Award at the 1999 Canadian Radio Music Awards, and a Genie Award for Best Original Song in 2000 for "One Thing to Say", their contribution to the film Jacob Two Two Meets the Hooded Fang. The band released several music videos in the late 1990s, and sang "O Canada" for various major league sporting events.

V.I.P. released a Christmas album entitled Let it Snow in 2004.

== After break-up ==
After Voices in Public disbanded, Coulson, Beecroft and Heslip went on to release a country album entitled After Tuesday in 2006. Heslip and Beecroft composed the original score for Universal Vivendi feature film Dark Rising in 2007. Heslip worked as a music teacher, counsellor, District Principal in British Columbia. Luciano became a lawyer in Toronto. Coulson co-hosted Rogers Local TV's Daytime in Barrie until 2012. Beecroft and Coulson continue to work on music / film projects. Beecroft worked at Microsoft for a number of years. Coulson is a Financial Advisor and man about town. Luciano is a member of 4Skor, a Toronto based vocal group.
