= Enuff Is Enuff =

1973 Canadian film

- French: J'ai mon voyage!
- Directed by: Denis Héroux
- Written by: Gilles Richer; Jacques Lanzmann; Jean Salvy
- Produced by: Claude Héroux
- Starring: Jean Lefebvre; Dominique Michel
- Cinematography: Jean-Marie Buquet; Bernard Chentrier
- Edited by: Étiennette Muse
- Music by: Claude Bolling
- Production company: Les Productions Mutuelles
- Distributed by: Les Films Mutuelles
- Release date: February 24, 1973
- Running time: 89 minutes
- Country: Canada
- Language: French

Enuff Is Enuff (French: J'ai mon voyage!) is a Canadian comedy film, directed by Denis Héroux and released in 1973. The film stars Jean Lefebvre as Jean-Louis Cartier, an insurance company employee from Quebec who is undertaking a road trip across Canada with his family after receiving a promotion to the company's head office in Vancouver, only to run into various complications that are giving him second thoughts about whether he wants to take the job.

The cast also includes Dominique Michel as his wife Danielle, and René Simard and Régis Simard as their sons Luc and François, as well as Francis Blanche, Mylène Demongeot, Denise Proulx, Germaine Gloutnez, Len Watt, Barry Baldaro, Dave Broadfoot, Yoland Guérard, Patsy Gallant, Dave Nichols and Yvan Ducharme in supporting roles.

The film addresses similar themes to Hold on to Daddy's Ears (Tiens-toi bien après les oreilles à papa), a 1971 film also written by screenwriter Gilles Richer, but is not a sequel. It also received release in France under the title Quand c'est parti, c'est parti !.
