= Black Ice (1992 film) =

- Directed by: Neill Fearnley
- Written by: Arne Olsen; John Alan Schwartz
- Produced by: Robert Vince; Vonnie von Helmolt
- Cinematography: David Geddes
- Edited by: Allan Lee
- Music by: Amin Bhatia
- Production companies: Saban Entertainment; Prism Pictures; Entertainment Securities
- Distributed by: Turner Home Entertainment (U.S.)
- Release date: December 2, 1992 (U.S.)
- Running time: 95 minutes
- Countries: Canada; United States
- Language: English

Black Ice (UK title A Passion for Murder) is a 1992 Canadian–American thriller film directed by Neill Fearnley and starring Joanna Pacuła, Michael Ironside, Michael Nouri, Mickey Jones, Brent Neale, Harry Nelken, Arne Olsen, Gene Pyrz, Thom Schioler and Rick Skene. The film was shot on location in Winnipeg.

== Plot ==
Vanessa, a beautiful young lady has been having an affair with Eric, a married, high-ranking politician. She finds herself in deep trouble when Eric suddenly dies after an argument erupts between them and she is forced to go on the run, which means that her affair with Eric was part of her work for a Government agency. Trouble really begins when her boss deserts her, and her only ally is the taxi driver taking her to safety.

== Cast ==
- Joanna Pacula as Vanessa
- Michael Ironside as Quinn
- Michael Nouri as Ben Shorr
- Mickey Jones as Lloyd Carter
- Brent Neale as David Yorkin
- Rick Skene as Denny

== Production ==
The film's was shot in Winnipeg, Manitoba, Canada, under the working title of The Fare. Principal photography began on November 22, 1991, and concluded on December 12. During production, the budget was estimated at around CAD$1.2 million.

== Release ==
The film was released on home video in the U.S. on December 2, 1992, by Prism Entertainment through Turner Home Entertainment.
