= Arne Olsen =

Canadian screenwriter (1961/1962–2026)

- Born: 1961 or 1962; Vancouver, British Columbia, Canada
- Died: April 4, 2026 (aged 64); Vancouver, British Columbia, Canada
- Education: American Film Institute
- Occupation: Screenwriter

Arne Olsen (1961 or 1962 – April 4, 2026) was a Canadian screenwriter. Among his contributions are the scripts for Cop and a Half and Mighty Morphin Power Rangers: The Movie. Olsen died from complications of cancer on April 4, 2026, at the age of 64.

== Filmography ==
He's credited as a writer on all films.

Year	Title	Notes
1988	Red Scorpion	
1992	Black Ice	Direct-to-video; also actor
1993	Cop and a Half	
1994	Final Round	Direct-to-video; also actor
1995	Mighty Morphin Power Rangers: The Movie	
1996	All Dogs Go to Heaven 2	
1997	Escape from Atlantis	TV film
2000	Here's to Life!	Also director and actor
2007	Grizzly Rage	TV film
2007	Hybrid	TV film
2010	Repeaters	
2018	Distorted	
