= Jim Michaels =

American television producer (born 1965)

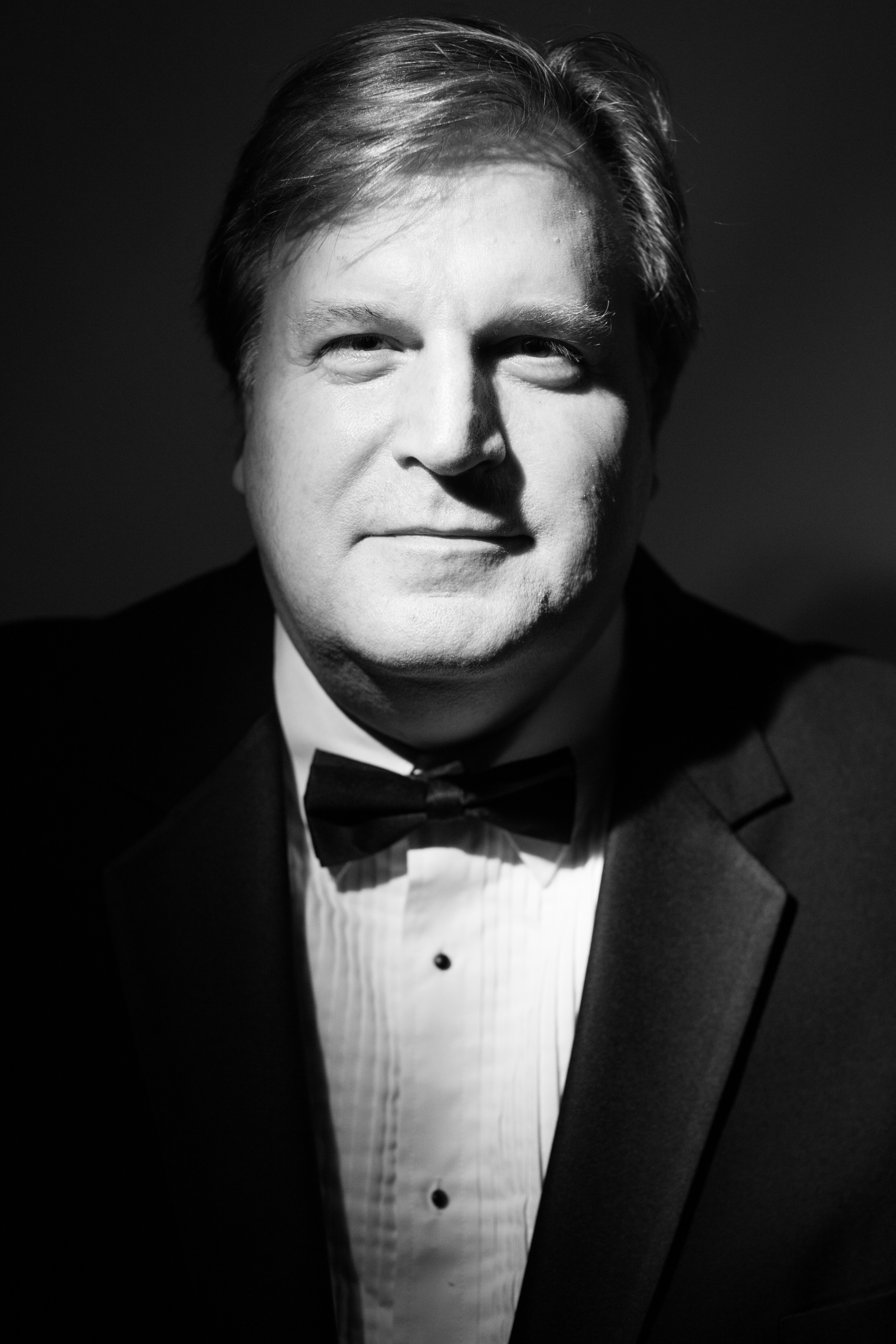
- Born: September 12, 1965 (age 61); Arlington Heights, Chicago, Illinois, U.S.
- Occupations: Television producer, director

Jim Michaels (born September 12, 1965) is an American television producer. While working in computer graphics, Michaels worked on television series such as Whiz Kids, Airwolf, Knight Rider, Amazing Stories, Street Hawk, Otherworld, Misfits of Science, A Year in the Life, Miami Vice, Magnum P.I., Simon & Simon, The Twilight Zone, Murder, She Wrote, The Return of Marcus Welby, Blacke's Magic and The Return of the Six Million Dollar Man and the Bionic Woman. He also worked on feature films such as Weird Science, Stick, Brewster's Millions and Back to the Future Part II.

Michaels was a post-production supervisor for Studio 5-B and Pee-Wee's Playhouse before moving into television production, producing the NBC series Midnight Caller and Reasonable Doubts. His other series included Charlie Grace for ABC; Turks, The Guardian and Dr. Vegas for CBS; Odyssey 5 for Showtime, and Lois & Clark: The New Adventures of Superman. Michaels is a member of the Producers Guild of America, Directors Guild of America, Screen Actors Guild, the Academy of Television Arts & Sciences, American Film Institute and has lectured at the Academy of Art, UCLA and NYU. He worked with Ali LeRoi and Chris Rock to produce the television series Everybody Hates Chris for four seasons.

== Early life ==
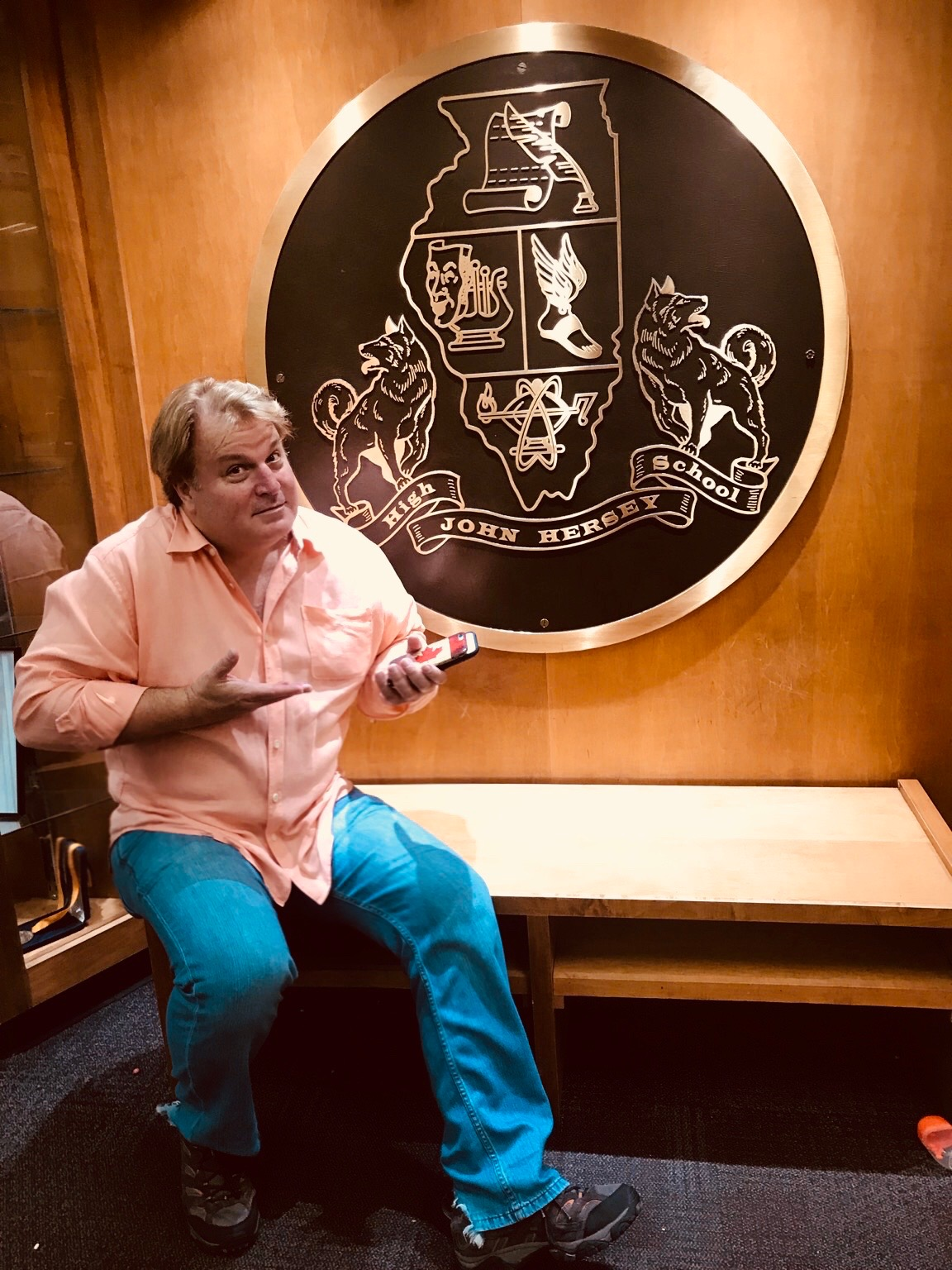
Michaels at Hersey High School in 2018

Michaels, the son of Anna Mae and Robert Michaels, was raised in the Chicago suburbs of Des Plaines and Arlington Heights, Illinois. He graduated from John Hersey High School in Arlington Heights and received a degree in business from the University of Evansville. Michaels established and oversaw the computer-graphics department at MCA/Universal Studios.

== Career ==
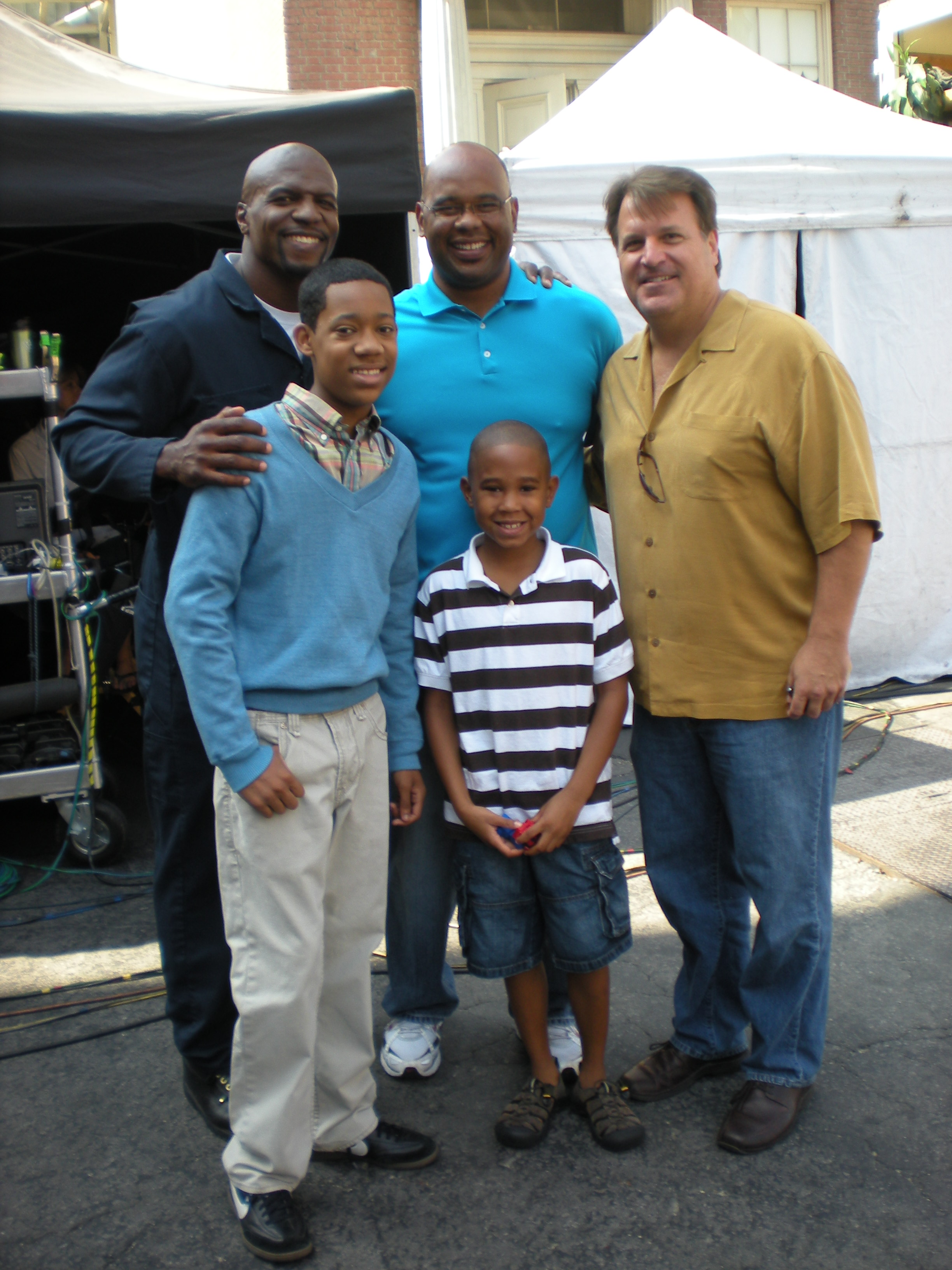
With Terry Crews and Tyler James Williams

Michaels produced the NBC series Midnight Caller and co-produced the NBC series Reasonable Doubts, a one-hour drama starring Mark Harmon and Marlee Matlin. For three seasons beginning in 1993, Michaels co-produced Lois & Clark: The New Adventures of Superman. That year, he had an off-screen role as the aquatic theater's announcer in the film Free Willy. Other productions include Charlie Grace (a one-hour ABC detective drama starring Mark Harmon as a private detective raising a 12-year-old) and Escape from Atlantis, a two-hour cable movie for Starz/Encore.

Michaels' next project was the CBS series Turks, followed by Cover Me: Based on the True Life of an FBI Family for the USA Network. He then produced the pilot for The Guardian pilot for CBS, the Odyssey 5 series for Showtime, and Dr. Vegas for CBS.

Michaels produced the Golden Globe-nominated, Chris Rock-inspired series Everybody Hates Chris. When that series was canceled after 88 episodes, he joined the production team of Supernatural at the beginning of season five. In 2017, Supernatural received the People's Choice Award for Favorite Network Sci-Fi/Fantasy TV Show. Michaels and Sean Astin produced a 2018 documentary, Remember the Sultana, about the sinking of the Sultana in the Mississippi River near Memphis, Tennessee, at the end of the Civil War. Her explosion and sinking remain the worst maritime disaster in American history.
