= Way Over Me =

- Genre: Thriller drama
- Created by: Sophie Lorain; Alexis Durand-Brault
- Directed by: Alexis Durand-Brault
- Starring: Pascale Bussières; Vincent Leclerc; Sophie Lorain; Bruno Marcil
- Country of origin: Canada
- Original language: French
- No. of seasons: 1
- No. of episodes: 6

Production
- Running time: 40 minutes

Original release
- Network: Super Écran; Crave
- Release: May 7, 2021 – present

Way Over Me (French: Sortez-moi de moi) is a Canadian television drama series, which premiered May 7, 2021 on Crave and Super Écran. Created by Sophie Lorain and Alexis Durand-Brault, it is the first French-language series ever to be marketed as a Crave original production.

A psychological thriller, the series stars Pascale Bussières as Dr. Justine Mathieu, an emergency room psychiatrist who becomes strongly attracted to, and initiates a relationship with, David Ducharme (Vincent Leclerc) after he is brought into the hospital while suffering a bipolar episode. The show also focuses on Clara St-Amand (Lorain), Myriam Melançon (Sandra Dumaresq) and Gabriel Beauregard (Bruno Marcil), the three emergency first responders she works with. The cast also includes Émile Proulx-Cloutier, Valérie Blais, Danielle Proulx and Émile Schneider in supporting roles.

The series airs in its original French-language form on Super Écran, while both subtitled and dubbed versions are available on Crave for anglophone audiences.

The series uses a cover of Daniel Bélanger's song "Sortez-moi de moi", from his 1996 album Quatre saisons dans le désordre, as its theme music.
