= Fortier (TV series) =

French-Canadian crime drama and mystery thriller television series (2000–2004)

- Genre: Crime drama Mystery thriller
- Created by: Fabienne Larouche
- Written by: Fabienne Larouche
- Directed by: François Gingras (all seasons); Érik Canuel (season 1); Sophie Lorain (season 5)
- Starring: See cast below
- Composers: DAZMO Musique (seasons 1-2); Miklos Simpson (seasons 3-5)
- Country of origin: Canada
- Original language: French
- No. of seasons: 5
- No. of episodes: 42

Production
- Executive producers: François Reid (seasons 1-2); Lucie Bouliane (season 3); Louis-Philippe Rochon (seasons 4-5)
- Producers: Fabienne Larouche (all seasons); Michel Trudeau (seasons 3-5)
- Production locations: Montreal, Quebec, Canada
- Cinematography: Georges Archambault
- Editors: André Corriveau (all seasons); Yves Chaput (season 1)
- Running time: 45 minutes
- Production company: Aetios Productions

Original release
- Network: TVA; CBC Television; TV5 Monde; AMI-tv
- Release: February 3, 2000 – April 1, 2004

Fortier is a French-language Canadian television series that debuted on the TVA network in Quebec from February 3, 2000, and ended on April 1, 2004. A subtitled version later aired on the English-language CBC Television network, as part of its now-defunct late-night Best of French Canada anthology series, then followed by broadcast internationally on TV5 Monde, and later re-showing again for the disability network AMI-tv on July 18, 2017.

It was made by Aetios Productions, and the show's creator, writer and producer Fabienne Larouche.

== Synopsis ==
Anne Fortier (Lorain) is a criminal psychologist from Montréal, who works with the [investigators of SAS (Anti-Sociopathic Service), a fictional police division specialising in crimes involving abnormal psychology. Although their sordid crimes include those of a shoe thief and a pyromaniac, most of the cases given a lot of time on the series are ruthless murders, often serial killings.

While solving these cases Fortier and her colleagues must wrestle with her own murky past and several psychological issues.

== Cast ==
=== Main characters ===
Actor	Character
Sophie Lorain	Anne Fortier
Gilbert Sicotte	Gabriel Johnson
Pierre Lebeau	Jean-Marie Dufour
Jean-François Pichette	Claude Mayrand
François Chénier	Étienne Parent

=== Recurring characters ===
Actor	Character
Carl Marotte	Jacques Savaria
Sylvie Drapeau	Louise Dusseault
Valérie Blais	Kathleen Giroux
Louise Marleau	Jeannine Ross
Alexis Martin	Thomas Sévigny (seasons 1–2)
Réjean Lefrançois	Armand Durivage
Louise Deslières	Suzanne Landreville
Benoît Dagenais	Fontaine
Paul Savoie	Roger Lefebvre
Danièle Lorain	Louise Garnier
Sophie Léger	Christine Forest
Jack	Fernand (le chien)

=== Notable guest stars ===
Actor	Character	Appearance
Roch Aubert	Alain Charest	"Dans le cœur d'une mère"
Annick Bergeron	Caroline Landry	"Trois petits chats"
Henri Chassé	Pierre Lemire	"Trois petits chats"
Stéphane Demers	Pierre Gagnon	"Soupçons et paranoia"
Michèle-Barbara Pelletier	Magali Simon	"Elles ne sont qu'une..."
Sara Leblanc	Johannie Desmarais	"Un petit lapin qui dit tout"
François Papineau	Claude Lizotte	"L'homme froid"
Steve Banner	Pierre-Paul Tétrault	Seasons 3–5
Anne-Marie Cadieux	Louise Marcotte	"Star académie" "Esprit de famille"
Patrick Labbé	Jacques Marcotte	"Star académie" "Esprit de famille"
Maude Tremblay-Harvey	Valérie Marcotte	"Star académie" "Esprit de famille"

== Episode list ==
Season	No.	Title	Original air date
1	1	"Dans le cœur d'une mère"	February 3, 2000
1	2	"Dans le cœur d'une mère"	February 10, 2000
1	3	"Trois petits chats"	February 17, 2000
1	4	"Trois petits chats"	February 24, 2000
1	5	"Trois petits chats"	March 2, 2000
1	6	"Apparences trompeuses"	March 9, 2000
1	7	"Apparences trompeuses"	March 16, 2000
1	8	"Apparences trompeuses"	March 23, 2000
1	9	"Soupçons et paranoïa"	March 30, 2000
1	10	"Soupçons et paranoïa"	April 6, 2000
2	11	"Elles ne sont qu'une..."	February 8, 2001
2	12	"Elles ne sont qu'une..."	February 15, 2001
2	13	"Elles ne sont qu'une..."	February 22, 2001
2	14	"Un petit lapin qui dit tout"	March 1, 2001
2	15	"Un petit lapin qui dit tout"	March 8, 2001
2	16	"Un petit lapin qui dit tout"	March 15, 2001
2	17	"L'homme froid"	March 22, 2001
2	18	"L'homme froid"	March 29, 2001
3	19	"Du cœur au ventre"	February 7, 2002
3	20	"Du cœur au ventre"	February 14, 2002
3	21	"Du cœur au ventre"	February 21, 2002
3	22	"Tout sera parfait"	February 28, 2002
3	23	"Tout sera parfait"	March 7, 2002
3	24	"Un passé si présent"	March 14, 2002
3	25	"Un passé si présent"	March 21, 2002
3	26	"Un passé si présent"	March 28, 2002
4	27	"Peines d'amour"	February 6, 2003
4	28	"Peines d'amour"	February 13, 2003
4	29	"Peines d'amour"	February 20, 2003
4	30	"24 heures"	February 27, 2003
4	31	"24 heures"	March 6, 2003
4	32	"Que veut une femme?"	March 13, 2003
4	33	"Que veut une femme?"	March 20, 2003
4	34	"Que veut une femme?"	March 27, 2003
5	35	"La rue anonyme"	February 5, 2004
5	36	"L'homme qui mangeait ses mots"	February 12, 2004
5	37	"L'horreur du double"	February 19, 2004
5	38	"Star académie"	March 4, 2004
5	39	"Esprit de famille"	March 11, 2004
5	40	"Windigo"	March 18, 2004
5	41	"La forêt meurtrière"	March 25, 2004
5	42	"Mauvais rêve"	April 1, 2004

== Awards and recognition ==
The series earned Michèle-Barbara Pelletier as the role of Magali Simon a Prix Gémeaux took place on September 30, 2001, for Best Supporting Actress - Series or Dramatic Program from her appearance in episodes two and three ("Elles ne sont qu'une...") of the second season.

Four other Prix Gémeaux nominations were given in the category Best Supporting Actor - Series or Dramatic Program, such as François Papineau for the role of Claude Lizotte in two episodes ("L'homme froid") of the second season.

== See also ==
- Television in Québec
