= Home Team (1998 film) =

1998 Canadian film by Allan A. Goldstein

- Directed by: Allan A. Goldstein
- Written by: Pierce O'Donnell; Jeff Lewis
- Screenplay by: Jeff Lewis; Pierce O'Donnell
- Produced by: Anthony Esposito; Christine Kavanagh; Claude Léger; Luciano Lisi
- Starring: Steve Guttenberg; Sophie Lorain; Ryan Slater
- Edited by: Richard Comeau
- Release date: November 30, 1998 (Canada)
- Running time: 91 minutes
- Country: Canada
- Language: English
- Budget: $4 million

Home Team is a 1998 comedy film starring Steve Guttenberg.

== Plot summary ==
Mr. Butler is a former pro soccer player whose reputation for partying and gambling has caught up with him. He is sentenced to a year of probation, which includes working as a handyman in a dilapidated boys' home. Karen runs the home for a group of eleven boys whose parents could not raise them for some reason. Karen wants the boys to do something meaningful so she persuades them to start a soccer team known simply as "Home Team". They are terrible, but Mr. Butler, who has concealed his skills so far, is persuaded to coach the team, which eventually improves. A fire damages the home to the point that it must be torn down, and the boys will be separated, but efforts are made to keep the boys together. In a rematch, Home Team ends up defeating the first team they played on the way to a possible championship. The boys' cook Cookie, who likes to bet on horse races, made a bet with a Las Vegas bookie that Home Team would win; his winnings will be enough to get them a new house.

== Cast ==
- Steve Guttenberg as Henry Butler
- Sophie Lorain as Karen
- Ryan Slater as Julian
- Michel Perron as Cookie
- Carl Alacchi as Larkin
- Johnny Morina as Alex
- Tyler Hynes as Chip
- David Deveau as Pineapple
- Frank Schorpion as Vince
- Richard Jutras as Semary
- Ashton Laine Jersey as Meghan
- Kathleen Fee as Social Service Woman
- Willy Lavendel as Charlie
- Chad Connell as Eric
- Anthony Etesonne-Bedard as Four Eyes
- Eric Lightbourne as Goodbye
- Brian Paul Imperial as Gregory

== Production ==
Home Team was filmed in Montreal, Quebec, Canada. 15-year old Ryan Slater in the film is also the half-brother of actor Christian Slater.

Screenwriter (and attorney) Pierce O'Donnell, who wrote the script in 1994, filed suit against the Canadian producer group in 2000, regarding allegedly unfair accounting practices in the film's development costs.

The French title of the movie is "Une combinaison gagnante" (A winning combination) and the German name is Home Team – Ein treffsicheres Team (An unerring team).

== Reception ==
The Wallflower critical guide to contemporary North American directors (2000) notes that Home Team was "little known" at that time. VideoHound's Golden Movie Retriever (2004) writes that the movie has a "familiar plot but that's not necessarily bad." The Radio Times Guide To Film (2007) opined that "Hollywood still hasn't got the hang of football (or soccer, as they insist on calling it) and this family-oriented frolic is decidedly minor league."

Efilmcritic.com's 2001 review of the film was especially biting, calling it "an affront to film making".

== See also ==
- List of association football films
