= Richard Comeau =

Canadian film editor

- Born: 1960 (age 65–66)
- Occupation: Film editor

Richard Comeau (born 1960) is a Canadian film editor.

He won the Genie Award for Best Editing two years in a row, for The Necessities of Life in 2008 and Polytechnique in 2009. He also won the Jutra Award for Gabrielle (2013) and was nominated for My Internship in Canada in 2016.

== Filmography ==
His films include:

- Justine's Film (Le film de Justine) - 1989
- Letters of Transit (Les Sauf-conduits) - 1991
- The Countess of Baton Rouge (La Comtesse de Bâton Rouge) - 1997
- The Revenge of the Woman in Black (La Vengeance de la femme en noir) - 1997
- The Seat of the Soul (Le siège de l'âme) - 1997
- 2 Seconds (2 secondes) - 1998
- It's Your Turn, Laura Cadieux (C't'à ton tour, Laura Cadieux) - 1998
- Maelström - 2000
- Tar Angel (L'Ange de goudron) - 2001
- Wedding Night (Nuit de noces) - 2001
- The Marsh (Le Marais) - 2002
- Mambo Italiano - 2003
- Stormy Night (Nuit d'orage) - 2003
- An American Haunting - 2006
- The Necessities of Life (Ce qu'il faut pour vivre) - 2008
- Polytechnique - 2009
- City of Shadows (La Cité) - 2010
- The Bait (L'Appât) - 2010
- Trash (Décharge) - 2011
- War Witch (Rebelle) - 2012
- Gabrielle - 2013
- The Good Lie - 2014
- My Internship in Canada (Guibord s'en va-t-en guerre) - 2015
- Two Lovers and a Bear - 2016
- Eye on Juliet - 2017
- And the Birds Rained Down (Il pleuvait des oiseaux) - 2019
- The Vinland Club (Le Club Vinland) - 2020
- Maria Chapdelaine - 2021
- Like a House on Fire - 2021
- White Dog (Chien blanc) - 2022
- Frontiers (Frontières) - 2023
- Lucy Grizzli Sophie - 2024
- You Will Be Free (Ma fille tu seras libre) - 2026

== Awards and nominations ==
Film	Year	Award	Result	Ref(s)
Maelström	2000	Genie Award for Best Editing	Nominated	
Maelström	2000	Jutra Award for Best Editing	Won	
Heart: The Marilyn Bell Story	2001	Gemini Award for Best Picture Editing in a Dramatic Program or Series	Won	
The Five of Us	2005	Genie Award for Best Editing	Nominated	
The Necessities of Life	2008	Genie Award for Best Editing	Won	
Polytechnique	2009	Genie Award for Best Editing	Won	
Polytechnique	2009	Jutra Award for Editing	Won	
War Witch	2012	Canadian Screen Award for Best Editing	Won	
Gabrielle	2013	Jutra Award for Editing	Won	
My Internship in Canada	2015	Jutra Award for Editing	Nominated	
Two Lovers and a Bear	2016	Canadian Screen Award for Best Editing	Won	
Two Lovers and a Bear	2016	Prix Iris for Editing	Won	
Stockholm	2018	Canadian Screen Award for Best Editing	Nominated	
