= Michel Forget =

Canadian actor

Michel Forget (born February 27, 1942, in Montreal, Quebec) is a Quebec actor.

== Background ==
Forget had a long acting career in which he participated in several films and television series which were popular among French Canadians.

In 1986, Michel Forget drove a boat from Paris to Montreal. It took him more than 72 hours.

His first role was in 1973 in Des armes et les hommes and he has played in a total of 57 movies or television series in his career. Among his most notable roles was the long-lived series Lance et Compte in which he played the role of Gilles Guilbault, the general manager of the Quebec National, a fictional NHL team inspired by the Quebec Nordiques (now Colorado Avalanche).

He also played in several popular television series such as Duplessis (1977), The Mills of Power (Les Tisserands du pouvoir, 1988), Super Sans Plomb (1989), Les Machos (1995) and Maurice Richard: Histoire d'un Canadien (1999).

Forget played supporting roles in a few films including Aurore in which he played the role of Nérée Caron, Aurore Gagnon's maternal grandfather.
