= Claude Fournier (filmmaker) =

Canadian film director (1931–2023)

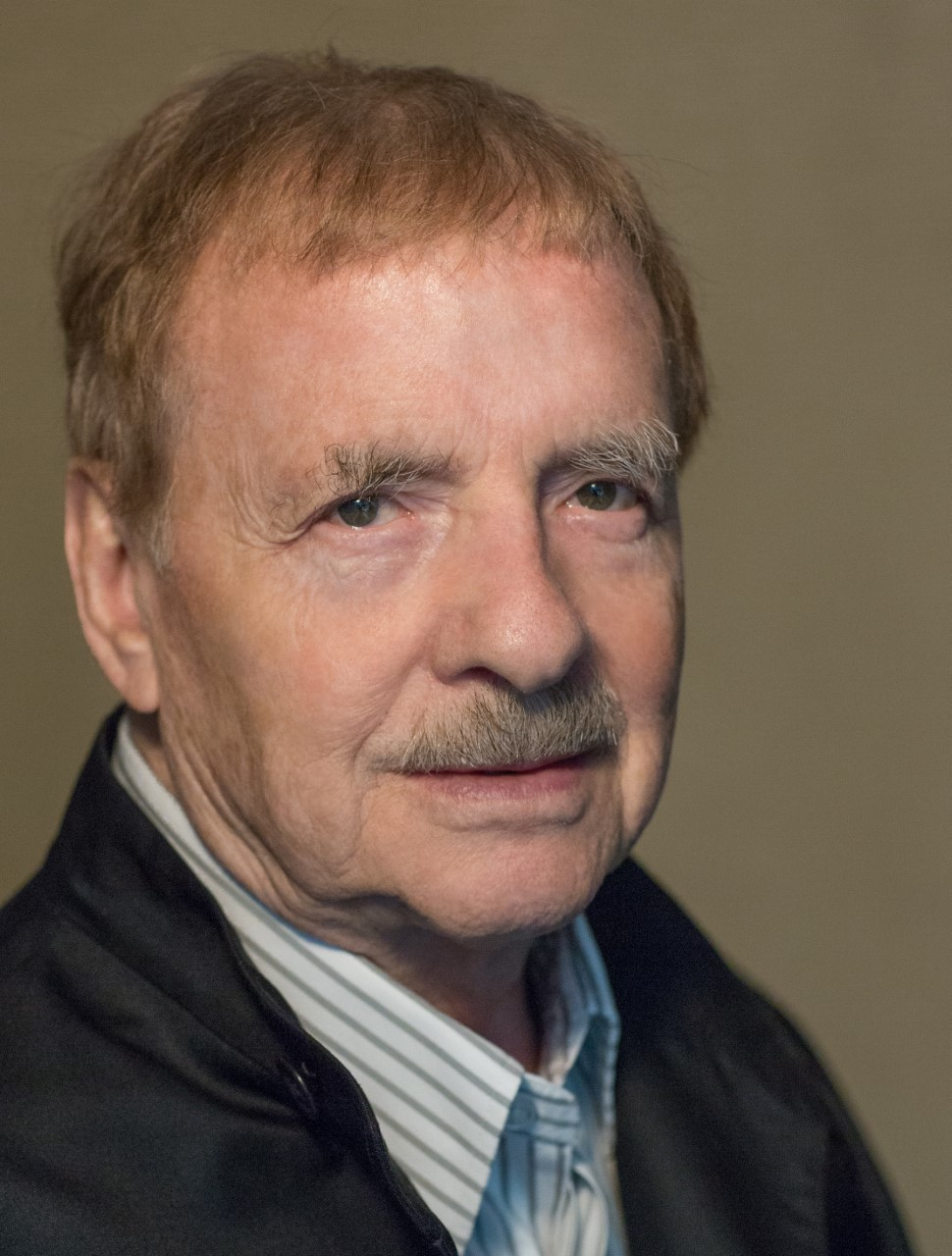
- Fournier in 2015
- Born: July 23, 1931; Waterloo, Quebec, Canada
- Died: March 16, 2023 (aged 91); Montreal, Quebec, Canada
- Occupations: Film director Cinematographer; Screenwriter
- Years active: 1958–2005

Claude Fournier (French pronunciation: [klod fuʁnje]; July 23, 1931 – March 16, 2023) was a Canadian film director, screenwriter, editor and cinematographer. He is one of the forerunners of the Cinema of Quebec. He was the twin brother of Guy Fournier.

== Career ==
Claude Fournier began his career in journalism then moved to the Radio-Canada as a news cameraman. He joined the National Film Board of Canada in 1957 as a writer and director, and he worked on early cinéma-vérité films such as À Saint-Henri le cinq septembre and La lutte. He left the Board to work in the United States with famed documentary filmmakers Richard Leacock and D.A. Pennebaker, then returned to Montreal in 1963 to set up his own production company, Rose Films.

In 1970, he directed Two Women in Gold (Deux femmes en or), one of the most successful Quebec films of its time. In the private sector, Fournier produced over 100 short films, co-wrote the Sophia Loren film A Special Day, a Canada-Italy co-production that was nominated for an Oscar, and directed The Tin Flute with Marilyn Lightstone and The Book of Eve with Claire Bloom. The Tin Flute was entered into the 13th Moscow International Film Festival. His 1988 TV series The Mills of Power (Les Tisserands du pouvoir) won him a Gémeaux Award for best direction of a television drama and a Genie Award for Best Screenplay.

Donald Sutherland described him as "one of the truly wretched directors of the world."

Also a published poet, novelist and essayist, Claude Fournier is an influential figure in Quebec cinema.

== Death ==
Claude Fournier died at the Montreal University Hospital Centre on 16 March 2023, at the age of 91. He had been hospitalised after suffering a heart attack during a trip to Martinique.

== Filmography ==
=== Features ===
- Two Women in Gold (Deux femmes en or) — 1970
- The Master Cats (Les chats bottés) — 1971
- Alien Thunder — 1974
- The Apple, the Stem and the Seeds (La pomme, la queue et les pépins) — 1974
- Far from You Sweetheart (Je suis loin de toi mignonne) — 1976
- Hot Dogs (Les chiens chauds) — 1980
- The Tin Flute (Bonheur d'occasion) — 1983
- Page trois: un ordinateur au coeur — 1985
- Heads or Tails (J'en suis!) — 1997
- The Book of Eve (Histoires d'Ève) — 2003
- My Only Love (Je n'aime que toi) — 2004

=== Documentaries ===
- Télésphore Légaré, garde-pêche (Short film, 1959)
- Alfred Desrochers, poète (Short film, 1960)
- La France sur un caillou (Short film Co-Directed with Gilles Groulx, 1961)
- La lutte (Short film Co-Directed with Michel Brault, Marcel Carrière and Claude Jutra, 1961)
- Midwestern Floods (Short film, 1962)
- Nehru (Short film, 1962)
- Vingt ans express (Series of 7 shorts, 1963–1964)
- Nomades de l'ouest (Short film, 1963)
- Calgary Stampede (Short film, 1965)
- Deux femmes (Short film, 1965)
- Columbium (Short film, 1966)
- Londres (Short film, 1966)
- On sait où entrer Tony, mais c'est les notes (Short film, 1966)
- Québec an 2000 (Short film co-directed with Aimée Danis, 1966)
- Sebring, La cinquième heure (Short film, 1966)
- Ti-Jean (Short film, 1966)
- Tony Roman (Short film, 1966)
- Du général au particulier (Short film, 1967)
- Canada Today (Short film of Expo 67, 1967)
- La greffe cardiaque (Short film, 1969)
- La greffe cardiaque, symposium de Montréal (Short film, 1969)
- Coeurs neufs (Short film a.k.a. Hearts, 1969)
- Le dossier Nelligan (1969)
- ...Et Dieu créa l'été (Short film Co-Directed with Marie-José Raymond, 1974)
- Aliments, gentils aliments (Short film Co-Directed with Marie-José Raymond, 1975)

=== Television ===
- The Newcomers — TV miniseries, 1977)
- The New Avengers — TV series, 1977
- Tales of the Klondike — TV miniseries a.k.a. The Scorn of Women, 1981
- The Mills of Power (Les tisserands du pouvoir) — TV miniseries, 1987
- Golden Fiddles — TV miniseries, 1990
- Juliette Pomerleau — TV miniseries, 1999
- Félix Leclerc: Les esprits du fleuve — TV miniseries, 2005
