= Denise Filiatrault =

Canadian actress and director (born 1931)

Denise Filiatrault CC OQ
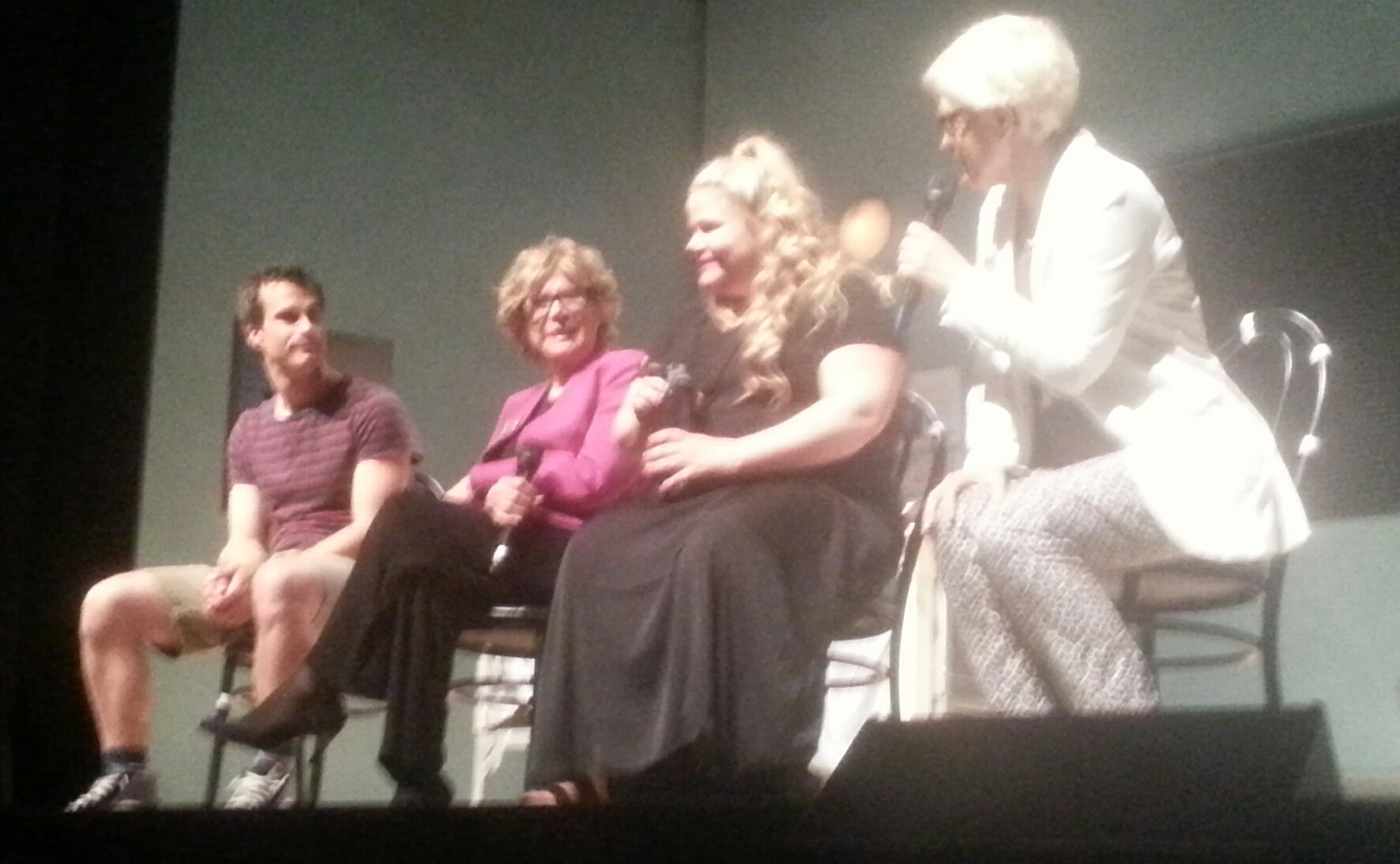
- Patrick Hivon, Denise Filiatrault and Geneviève Schmidt
- Born: May 16, 1931 (age 95); Montreal, Quebec, Canada
- Occupations: Actress, director

Denise Filiatrault CC OQ (born May 16, 1931) is a Canadian actress and director. After acting through the 1960s to 1980s, Filiatrault began writing and directing. Her first movie, It's Your Turn, Laura Cadieux, came out in 1998. Filiatrault received Quebec's lifetime achievement award, the Prix Iris Tribute Award, in 2006.

== Biography ==
Filiatrault attained star status on TV in the 1960s, co-starring with Dominique Michel in the Radio-Canada television series Moi et l'autre (1967–71) and in many editions of Radio-Canada's annual New Year's special, Bye Bye. She had further success in Chez Denise (1978–1982), Le 101, avenue des Pins (1984–85) and Denise... aujourd'hui (1990–91).

In addition to her television career, Filiatrault also performed in films and on stage, notably in works by Michel Tremblay. She was known to perform both comic and dramatic roles, such as Gilles Carle's The Death of a Lumberjack (La Mort d'un bûcheron) in 1973, André Brassard's film version of Tremblay's Once Upon a Time in the East (Il était une fois dans l'Est) in 1974, Denys Arcand's Gina in 1975, Claude Fournier's Far from You Sweetheart (Je suis loin de toi mignonne) in 1976, Fantastica in 1980 and Carle's The Plouffe Family (Les Plouffe) in 1981, playing the tormented Cécile.

Following Les Plouffe, Filiatrault took a break from film, concentrating more in writing and directing for theatre and summer comedy. Filiatrault then decided to take the leap to directing cinema by adapting Tremblay's novel C't'à ton tour, Laura Cadieux into the 1998 film It's Your Turn, Laura Cadieux, presenting the world of overweight women yearning for love and affection. Filiatrault opted for a simple yet effective style that showcased the talents of the film's strong female leads. This dramatic comedy scored such success that Filiatrault wrote and directed the 1999 sequel Laura Cadieux II (Laura Cadieux... la suite), in which she further developed the characters and their world.

In 2002, she produced a new comedy fantasy, Alice's Odyssey (L'Odyssée d'Alice Tremblay), which received a lukewarm response from critics and moviegoers. In 2003, taking advantage of the success of her motion picture characters, Filiatrault produced a television miniseries for TVA, Le Petit monde de Laura Cadieux (2003), before tackling a new film Bittersweet Memories (Ma vie en cinémascope) (2004), a dramatic biography of 1930s-1950s singer Alys Robi (played by Pascale Bussières).

As artistic director of the Théâtre du Rideau Vert, she and the theatre were criticized in January 2015 by a coalition of Montreal arts groups for a year-end production in which a Caucasian actor portrayed hockey player P.K. Subban in blackface. Filiatrault responded that she was "shocked, outraged, and humiliated" by the reaction, saying that she had been in show business for 60 years and was the first person to hire a black Quebecer on television.

== Awards and honours ==
At the 3rd Genie Awards in 1982, she won a "Best Performance by an Actress in a Supporting Role" Genie Award for her performance in The Plouffe Family (Les Plouffe). Filiatrault received a Governor General's Performing Arts Award for her work in television in 1999. In 1994, she was made an Officer of the Order of Canada, and was elevated to Companion of the Order in 2020. In 2000, she was made an Officer of the National Order of Quebec. At the 26th Genie Awards in 2004, she was nominated for an "Achievement in Direction" and "Original Screenplay" Genie Award for Bittersweet Memories (Ma vie en cinémascope). In 2006 Filiatrault received the Jutra Award (now called the Prix Iris Tribute Award) for her overall career.
