= François Dompierre =

Canadian musician, songwriter and composer

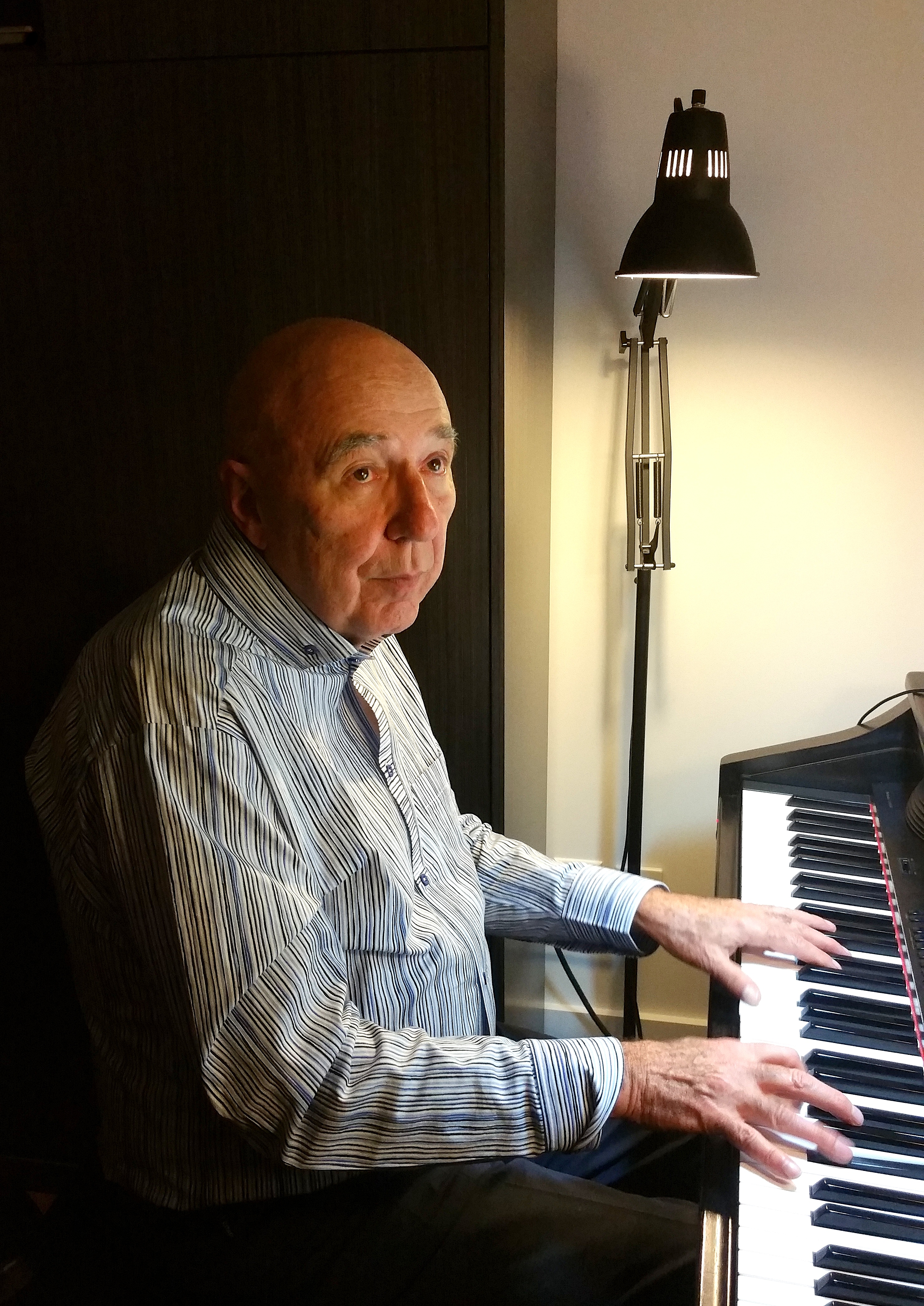
François Dompierre in 2018

François Dompierre C.M. (born July 1, 1943) is a Canadian musician, songwriter and composer, best known as a composer of film scores.

== Early life and education ==
Dompierre was born in Ottawa, Ontario, and grew up in Hull, Quebec (now Gatineau, Quebec). His mother played piano and his father was a choir director. He studied music at the Conservatoire de musique du Québec à Montréal.

== Career ==
Dompierre first became known as a performer of jazz-inspired chansonnier pop. He soon abandoned this to pursue classical composition and conducting, working with orchestras such as the Montreal Symphony Orchestra, the Quebec Symphony Orchestra and the Vancouver Symphony Orchestra.

Dompierre composed scores for many films; he is a two-time Genie Award winner for Best Original Score, winning at the 6th Genie Awards for Mario and at the 7th Genie Awards for The Alley Cat, and a two-time winner for Best Original Song, winning at the 18th Genie Awards as cowriter with Luc Plamondon of "L'Homme idéal" and at the 21st Genie Awards for "Fortuna".

Other films for which he has composed scores have included Deliver Us from Evil (Délivrez-nous du mal), Hold on to Daddy's Ears (Tiens-toi bien après les oreilles à papa), The Decline of the American Empire, Jesus of Montreal, The Tin Flute and The Passion of Augustine.

In 2008, Dompierre was the recipient of the Lifetime Achievement Award at the Francophone SOCAN Awards held in Montreal. He was appointed a Member of the Order of Canada in 2014.

Dompierre composed 24 Preludes, in remembrance of Bob Alain, a jazz pianist who influenced his early career.

In 2015, the film La passion d’Augustine, scored by Dompierre, was released. That year the Prix Jutra announced that Dompierre would be given a lifetime achievement award at the 2016 awards.

In 2018 the Sutton Museum mounted an exhibition of Dompierre's work, including a presentation of his composition, "Petit Concerto de Saint-Irénée".

In 2019 Dompierre published a biography of his longtime friend and collaborator Monique Leyrac.
