= 23rd Genie Awards =

2003 Canadian film awards ceremony

- Date: 13 February 2003

Highlights
- Best Picture: Ararat
- Most nominations: Ararat (9)

The 23rd Genie Awards were held in 2003 to honour films released in 2002. The ceremony was hosted by Arsinée Khanjian and Peter Keleghan.

== Nominees and winners ==
The Genie Award winner in each category is shown in bold text.

Motion Picture	Direction
**Ararat — Atom Egoyan, Robert Lantos**; Bollywood/Hollywood — David Hamilton, Bob Wertheimer; Québec-Montréal — Nicole Robert, Zofia Tujaka; Rare Birds — Paul Pope, Janet York; Suddenly Naked — Gavin Wilding	**David Cronenberg, Spider**; Jean Beaudin, The Collector (Le Collectionneur); Sturla Gunnarsson, Rare Birds; Ricardo Trogi, Québec-Montréal; Anne Wheeler, Suddenly Naked
Actor in a leading role	Actress in a leading role
**Luc Picard, Savage Messiah**; David Alpay, Ararat; Philip DeWilde, Turning Paige; Christopher Plummer, Ararat; Colin Roberts, Flower & Garnet	**Arsinée Khanjian, Ararat**; Isabelle Blais, Savage Messiah; Molly Parker, Men With Brooms; Deborah Kara Unger, Between Strangers; Polly Walker, Savage Messiah
Actor in a supporting role	Actress in a supporting role
**Elias Koteas, Ararat**; Ranjit Chowdhry, Bollywood/Hollywood; Dominic Darceuil, Inside (Histoire de pen); Brendan Fletcher, Turning Paige; Gabriel Gascon, The Marsh (Le Marais)	**Pascale Montpetit, Savage Messiah**; Brigitte Bako, Saint Monica; Moushmi Chatterji, Bollywood/Hollywood; Rachel McAdams, Perfect Pie; Dina Pathak, Bollywood/Hollywood
Original Screenplay	Adapted Screenplay
**Deepa Mehta, Bollywood/Hollywood**; Atom Egoyan, Ararat; Paul Gross and John Krizanc, Men with Brooms; Robert Morin, The Negro (Le nèg'); Jean-Phillipe Pearson, Patrice Robitaille and Ricardo Trogi, Québec-Montréal	**Sharon Riis, Savage Messiah**; Dominique Demers, The Mysterious Miss C. (La Mystérieuse mademoiselle C.); Patrick McGrath, Spider; Edward Riche, Rare Birds; Judith Thompson, Perfect Pie
Best Live Action Short Drama	Best Animated Short
**Meredith Caplan, Sarah Polley and Jennifer Weiss, I Shout Love**; Dawn Rubin and Ann Marie Fleming, Blue Skies; Raymond Gravelle and Mario Bonenfant, In Store (En magasin); Ginette Petit, Eric Beauséjour, Eric Couture, Richard Jutras and Christian Larouche, Hit and Run; Paula Fleck and Stephanie Morgenstern, Remembrance; Barbara Shrier and Rosa Zacharie, Clearing Skies (Une éclaircie sur le fleuve)	**John Weldon, The Hungry Squid**; Marcy Page and Brian Duchscherer, Glasses; Pierre Hébert, Marcel Jean and Tali Prévost, Pirouette
Art Direction/Production Design	Cinematography
**François Séguin, Almost America**; Phillip Barker, Ararat; André-Line Beauparlant, The Negro (Le nèg'); Andrew Sanders and Arvinder Grewal, Spider; Paryse Normandeau, Turning Paige	**Paul Sarossy, Perfect Pie**; Gregory Middleton, Between Strangers; Larry Lynn, Inside (Histoire de pen); Jan Kiesser, Rare Birds; Serge Ladouceur, Savage Messiah
Costume Design	Editing
**Beth Pasternak, Ararat**; Wendy Partridge, Almost America; Sophie Lefebvre, The Negro (Le nèg'); Mario Davignon, Savage Messiah; Denise Cronenberg, Spider	**Lara Mazur, Suddenly Naked**; Roberto Silvi, Between Strangers; Michael Dowse, FUBAR; Lorraine Dufour, The Negro (Le nèg'); Yvann Thibaudeau, Québec-Montréal
Overall Sound	Sound Editing
**Thomas Hidderley, Todd Beckett, Keith Elliott and Mark Zsifkovits, Between Strangers**; Serge Beauchemin, Bruno Ruffolo, Bernard Gariépy Strobl and Hans Peter Strobl, Les Boys III; Serge Beauchemin, Bernard Gariépy Strobl and Hans Peter Strobl, The Collector (Le Collectionneur); Gavin Fernandes, Bobby O'Malley and Philippe Pelletier, Inside (Histoire de pen); Lou Solakofski and Steph Carrier, Max; Glen Gauthier, Christian T. Cooke, Orest Sushko and Don White, Spider	**Fred Brennan, Roderick Deogrades, Barry Gilmore, Andy Malcolm, David McCallum and Jane Tattersall, Max**; Louis Dupire, Diane Boucher, Tchae Measroch, Christian Rivest and Alice Wright, The Collector (Le Collectionneur); Louis Collin, Natalie Fleurant and Denis Saindon, Inside (Histoire de pen); David Evans, Harvey Hyslop, Donna Powell and Paul Steffler, Rare Birds; Wayne Griffin, Tony Currie, David Evans, Goro Koyama and Andy Malcolm, Spider
Achievement in Music: Original Score	Achievement in Music: Original Song
**Mychael Danna, Ararat**; Zbigniew Preisner, Between Strangers; Michel Cusson, The Collector (Le Collectionneur); Glenn Morley, Duct Tape Forever; Chris Ainscough, Suddenly Naked	**Carlos Lopes, "Com estas asas" — Saint Monica**; Mel M'Rabet, "Ab (Father)" — Khaled; Laura Doyle, "Let You Go" — Suddenly Naked; Laura Doyle, "Your Love" — Suddenly Naked; Michael Shields, "Just Say Goodbye" — Turning Paige
Documentary	Special awards
**Gambling, Gods and LSD, Ingrid Veninger, Peter Mettler, Alexandra Gill and Cornelia Seitler**; Is the Crown at War with Us?, Alanis Obomsawin; The Ring Within (Le ring intérieur), Éric Michel and Dan Bigras	Claude Jutra Award: Keith Behrman, Flower & Garnet; Golden Reel Award: Les Boys III; Special Award: Robert Daudelin, Sheila Copps
