= 3rd Jutra Awards =

2001 Canadian film awards ceremony

The 3rd Jutra Awards were held on February 25, 2001 to honour films made with the participation of the Quebec film industry in 2000. The hosts of the ceremony were Yves Jacques and Élise Guilbault.

Denis Villeneuve's Maelström received eight awards from eight nominations, including Best Film, Best Director, Best Screenplay and Best Actress for Marie-Josée Croze, becoming the first film to sweep the awards and to win every category it was nominated for.

== Winners and nominees ==
Best Film	Best Director
Maelström — Roger Frappier, Luc Vandal; Hochelaga — Michel Jetté, Louise Sabourin; Life After Love (La vie après l'amour) — Roger Frappier, Luc Vandal; The Orphan Muses (Les muses orphelines) — Lyse Lafontaine, Pierre Latour	Denis Villeneuve, Maelström; Philippe Falardeau, The Left-Hand Side of the Fridge (La moitié gauche du frigo); Robert Favreau, The Orphan Muses (Les muses orphelines); Michel Jetté, Hochelaga
Best Actor	Best Actress
Paul Ahmarani, The Left-Hand Side of the Fridge (La Mmitié gauche du frigo); Michel Côté, Life After Love (La vie après l'amour); David La Haye, Full Blast; François Papineau, The Bottle (La bouteille)	Marie-Josée Croze, Maelström; Hélène Loiselle, The Bottle (La bouteille); Fanny Mallette, The Orphan Muses (Les muses orphelines); Louise Portal, Full Blast
Best Supporting Actor	Best Supporting Actress
David Boutin, Hochelaga; Patrick Huard, Life After Love (La vie après l'amour); Julien Poulin, Heaven (Le petit ciel); Donald Sutherland, The Art of War	Marie-Jo Thério, Full Blast; Maude Guérin, Pandora's Beauty (La beauté de Pandore); Sylvie Moreau, The Bottle (La bouteille); Guylaine Tremblay, Life After Love (La vie après l'amour)
Best Screenplay	Best Cinematography
Denis Villeneuve, Maelström; Philippe Falardeau, The Left-Hand Side of the Fridge (La moitié gauche du frigo); Michel Jetté, Hochelaga; Ken Scott, Life After Love (La vie après l'amour)	André Turpin, Maelström; Jonathan Freeman, Possible Worlds; Pierre Gill, The Art of War; Nathalie Moliavko-Visotzky, The Three Madeleines (Les fantômes des 3 Madeleine)
Best Art Direction	Best Sound
Sylvain Gingras and Denis Sperdouklis, Maelström; Jean Morin, Stardom; Jean Morin and Pierre Perrault, The Art of War; Collin Niemi, Possible Worlds	Gilles Corbeil, Mathieu Beaudin, Louis Gignac, Jérôme Décarie, Jo Caron, Daniel Bisson and Carole Gagnon, Maelström; Dominique Delguste, Hochelaga; Dominik Pagacz, The Orphan Muses (Les muses orphelines); Claude La Haye and Michel Pothier, Stardom
Best Editing	Best Original Music
Richard Comeau, Maelström; Hélène Girard, The Orphan Muses (Les muses orphelines); Michel Jetté and Louise Sabourin, Hochelaga; Sophie Leblond, The Left-Hand Side of the Fridge (La moitié gauche du frigo)	Michel Donato and James Gelfand, The Orphan Muses (Les muses orphelines); Ned Bouhalassa, François Bruneau and Jean-Marc Pisapia, Pandora's Beauty (La beauté de Pandore); Gilles Grégoire, Hochelaga; Robert Marcel Lepage, Full Blast
Best Live Short	Best Animated Short
Inséparables — Normand Bergeron; Lila — Robin Aubert; Romain et Juliette — Frédéric Lapierre; Take-out — Jean-François Monette	The Hat (Le chapeau) — Michèle Cournoyer; The Boy Who Saw the Iceberg (Le garçon qui a vu l'iceberg) — Paul Driessen; Deadpan — Rick Raxlen; From the Big Bang to Tuesday Morning (Du big bang à mardi matin) — Claude Cloutier
Best Documentary	Special Awards
Searching for Louis Archambault (À la recherche de Louis Archambault) — Werner Volkmer; Guantanamera Boxe — Richard Jean-Baptiste, Yann Langevin; If Only I — Donigan Cumming; Man of Grease — Ezra Soiferman	Jutra Hommage: Gilles Carle; Most Successful Film Outside Quebec: Possible Worlds; Billet d'or: Life After Love (La vie après l'amour)

== Multiple wins and nominations ==
=== Films with multiple nominations ===
Nominations	Film
8	Maelström
7	Hochelaga
6	The Orphan Muses (Les muses orphelines)
5	Life After Love (La vie après l'amour)
4	Full Blast
4	The Left-Hand Side of the Fridge (La moitié gauche du frigo)
3	The Art of War
3	The Bottle (La bouteille)
3	Possible Worlds
2	Pandora's Beauty (La beauté de Pandore)
2	Stardom

=== Film with multiple wins ===
Wins	Film
8	Maelström
