= Prix Iris for Best Cinematography =

Annual Canadian film award

The Prix Iris for Best Cinematography (French: Prix Iris de la meilleure direction de la photographie) is an annual film award presented by Québec Cinéma as part of the Prix Iris awards program, to honour the year's best cinematography in the Cinema of Quebec.

Until 2016, it was known as the Jutra Award for Best Cinematography in memory of influential Quebec film director Claude Jutra. Following the withdrawal of Jutra's name from the award, the 2016 award was presented under the name Québec Cinéma. The Prix Iris name was announced in October 2016.

Cinematographer André Turpin received the most nominations and wins for this category, with thirteen nominations and seven awards. Cinematographer Pierre Mignot receive three consecutive awards in 2005, 2006 and 2007. Robert Morin received a nomination in 2009 for Daddy Goes Ptarmigan Hunting (Papa à la chasse aux lagopèdes), becoming the second cinematographer, after Turpin, to be nominated for a film he also directed.

== 1990s ==
Year	Cinematographer	Film	Ref
1999; 1st Jutra Awards
1999; 1st Jutra Awards	Alain Dostie	The Red Violin (Le violon rouge)	
1999; 1st Jutra Awards	Pierre Letarte	When I Will Be Gone (L'âge de braise)	
1999; 1st Jutra Awards	Pierre Mignot	Nô	
1999; 1st Jutra Awards	André Turpin	August 32nd on Earth (Un 32 août sur terre)	

== 2000s ==
Year	Cinematographer	Film	Ref
2000; 2nd Jutra Awards
2000; 2nd Jutra Awards	Pierre Gill	Memories Unlocked (Souvenirs intimes)	
2000; 2nd Jutra Awards	Éric Cayla	Babel	
2000; 2nd Jutra Awards	Guy Dufaux	The Eleventh Child (Nguol thùa)	
2000; 2nd Jutra Awards	André Turpin	Matroni and Me (Matroni et moi)	
2001; 3rd Jutra Awards
2001; 3rd Jutra Awards	André Turpin	Maelström	
2001; 3rd Jutra Awards	Jonathan Freeman	Possible Worlds	
2001; 3rd Jutra Awards	Pierre Gill	The Art of War	
2001; 3rd Jutra Awards	Nathalie Moliavko-Visotzky	The Three Madeleines (Les fantômes des 3 Madeleine)	
2002; 4th Jutra Awards
2002; 4th Jutra Awards	André Turpin	Soft Shell Man (Un crabe dans la tête)	
2002; 4th Jutra Awards	Alain Dostie	February 15, 1839 (15 février 1839)	
2002; 4th Jutra Awards	Guy Dufaux	Tar Angel (L'ange de goudron)	
2002; 4th Jutra Awards	Carlos Ferrand	Games of the Heart (Du pic au cœur)	
2003; 5th Jutra Awards
2003; 5th Jutra Awards	Jean Lépine	Séraphin: Heart of Stone (Séraphin: un homme et son péché)	
2003; 5th Jutra Awards	Éric Cayla	The Baroness and the Pig	
2003; 5th Jutra Awards	David Franco	Chaos and Desire (La turbulence des fluides)	
2003; 5th Jutra Awards	Daniel Vincelette	The Marsh (Le marais)	
2004; 6th Jutra Awards
2004; 6th Jutra Awards	Allen Smith	Seducing Doctor Lewis (La grande séduction)	
2004; 6th Jutra Awards	Guy Dufaux	The Barbarian Invasions (Les invasions barbares)	
2004; 6th Jutra Awards	Nathalie Moliavko-Visotzky	Ma voisine danse le ska	
2004; 6th Jutra Awards	Jean-Pierre St-Louis	Gaz Bar Blues	
2005; 7th Jutra Awards
2005; 7th Jutra Awards	Pierre Mignot	The Blue Butterfly	
2005; 7th Jutra Awards	Serge Desrosiers	Dans une galaxie près de chez vous	
2005; 7th Jutra Awards	Alexis Durand-Brault	The Five of Us (Elles étaient cinq)	
2005; 7th Jutra Awards	Louis de Ernsted	Battle of the Brave (Nouvelle-France)	
2006; 8th Jutra Awards
2006; 8th Jutra Awards	Pierre Mignot	C.R.A.Z.Y.	
2006; 8th Jutra Awards	Steve Asselin	Saint Martyrs of the Damned (Saints-Martyrs-des-Damnés)	
2006; 8th Jutra Awards	Pierre Gill	The Rocket (Maurice Richard)	
2006; 8th Jutra Awards	Jean-Claude Labrecque	The Novena (La neuvaine)	
2007; 9th Jutra Awards
2007; 9th Jutra Awards	Pierre Mignot	A Sunday in Kigali (Un dimanche à Kigali)	
2007; 9th Jutra Awards	Yves Bélanger	Cheech	
2007; 9th Jutra Awards	Allen Smith	The Little Book of Revenge (Guide de la petite vengeance)	
2007; 9th Jutra Awards	André Turpin	Congorama	
2008; 10th Jutra Awards
2008; 10th Jutra Awards	Alain Dostie	Silk	
2008; 10th Jutra Awards	Bruce Chun	Nitro	
2008; 10th Jutra Awards	Bernard Couture	The 3 L'il Pigs (Les 3 p'tits cochons)	
2008; 10th Jutra Awards	Sara Mishara	Continental, a Film Without Guns (Continental, un film sans fusil)	
2009; 11th Jutra Awards
2009; 11th Jutra Awards	André Turpin	It's Not Me, I Swear! (C'est pas moi, je le jure!)	
2009; 11th Jutra Awards	Daniel Jobin	Mommy Is at the Hairdresser's (Maman est chez le coiffeur)	
2009; 11th Jutra Awards	Robert Morin	Daddy Goes Ptarmigan Hunting (Papa à la chasse aux lagopèdes)	
2009; 11th Jutra Awards	Ronald Plante	The Broken Line (La ligne brisée)	

== 2010s ==
Year	Cinematographer	Film	Ref
2010; 12th Jutra Awards
2010; 12th Jutra Awards	Pierre Gill	Polytechnique	
2010; 12th Jutra Awards	Bernard Couture	Cadavres	
2010; 12th Jutra Awards	Daniel Jobin	Je me souviens	
2010; 12th Jutra Awards	Sara Mishara	The Legacy (La donation)	
2010; 12th Jutra Awards	Ronald Plante	The Master Key (Grande Ourse, la clé des possibles)	
2011; 13th Jutra Awards
2011; 13th Jutra Awards	André Turpin	Incendies	
2011; 13th Jutra Awards	Nicolas Bolduc	City of Shadows (La cité)	
2011; 13th Jutra Awards	Bernard Couture	7 Days (Les sept jours du talion)	
2011; 13th Jutra Awards	Michel La Veaux	Mourning for Anna (Trois temps après la mort d'Anna)	
2011; 13th Jutra Awards	Claudine Sauvé	Silence Lies (Tromper le silence)	
2012; 14th Jutra Awards
2012; 14th Jutra Awards	Pierre Cottereau	Café de Flore	
2012; 14th Jutra Awards	Bernard Couture	A Sense of Humour (Le sens de l'humour)	
2012; 14th Jutra Awards	Daniel Jobin	Coteau rouge	
2012; 14th Jutra Awards	Michel La Veaux	For the Love of God (Pour l'amour de Dieu)	
2012; 14th Jutra Awards	Jean-François Lord	Snow and Ashes	
2013; 15th Jutra Awards
2013; 15th Jutra Awards	Nicolas Bolduc	War Witch (Rebelle)	
2013; 15th Jutra Awards	Yves Bélanger	Laurence Anyways	
2013; 15th Jutra Awards	Mathieu Laverdière	The Torrent (Le torrent)	
2013; 15th Jutra Awards	Sara Mishara	All That You Possess (Tout ce que tu possèdes)	
2013; 15th Jutra Awards	Geneviève Perron	Camion	
2014; 16th Jutra Awards
2014; 16th Jutra Awards	Michel La Veaux	The Dismantling (Le démantèlement)	
2014; 16th Jutra Awards	Steve Asselin	Another House (L'Autre Maison)	
2014; 16th Jutra Awards	Nicolas Bolduc	Louis Cyr (Louis Cyr: L'homme le plus fort du monde)	
2014; 16th Jutra Awards	Nathalie Moliavko-Visotzky	Catimini	
2014; 16th Jutra Awards	André Turpin	Whitewash	
2015; 17th Jutra Awards
2015; 17th Jutra Awards	André Turpin	Mommy	
2015; 17th Jutra Awards	Nicolas Bolduc	Enemy	
2015; 17th Jutra Awards	Mathieu Laverdière	Henri Henri	
2015; 17th Jutra Awards	Sara Mishara	You're Sleeping Nicole (Tu dors Nicole)	
2015; 17th Jutra Awards	André Turpin	Tom at the Farm (Tom à la ferme)	
2016; 18th Quebec Cinema Awards
2016; 18th Quebec Cinema Awards	Yves Bélanger	Brooklyn	
2016; 18th Quebec Cinema Awards	Steve Asselin	Corbo	
2016; 18th Quebec Cinema Awards	Serge Desrosiers	Ville-Marie	
2016; 18th Quebec Cinema Awards	Pierre Gill	Elephant Song	
2016; 18th Quebec Cinema Awards	Daniel Jobin	The Passion of Augustine (La passion d'Augustine)	
2017; 19th Quebec Cinema Awards
2017; 19th Quebec Cinema Awards	André Turpin	It's Only the End of the World (Juste la fin du monde)	
2017; 19th Quebec Cinema Awards	Glauco Bermudez	Before the Streets (Avant les rues)	
2017; 19th Quebec Cinema Awards	Nicolas Bolduc	Two Lovers and a Bear	
2017; 19th Quebec Cinema Awards	Josée Deshaies	Nelly	
2017; 19th Quebec Cinema Awards	Tobie Marier Robitaille	Nitro Rush	
2018; 20th Quebec Cinema Awards
2018; 20th Quebec Cinema Awards	Nicolas Bolduc	Hochelaga, Land of Souls (Hochelaga, terre des âmes)	
2018; 20th Quebec Cinema Awards	Steve Asselin	Barefoot at Dawn (Pieds nus dans l'aube)	
2018; 20th Quebec Cinema Awards	Nicolas Canniccioni	The Little Girl Who Was Too Fond of Matches (La petite fille qui aimait trop les allumettes)	
2018; 20th Quebec Cinema Awards	François Dutil	Cross My Heart (Les rois mongols)	
2018; 20th Quebec Cinema Awards	Michel La Veaux	Iqaluit	
2019; 21st Quebec Cinema Awards
2019; 21st Quebec Cinema Awards	Sara Mishara	The Great Darkened Days (La grande noirceur)	
2019; 21st Quebec Cinema Awards	Steve Asselin	1991	
2019; 21st Quebec Cinema Awards	Ian Lagarde	For Those Who Don't Read Me (À tous ceux qui ne me lisent pas)	
2019; 21st Quebec Cinema Awards	François Messier-Rheault	Ghost Town Anthology (Répertoire des villes disparues)	
2019; 21st Quebec Cinema Awards	Ronald Plante	La Bolduc	

== 2020s ==
Year	Cinematographer	Film	Ref
2020; 22nd Quebec Cinema Awards
2020; 22nd Quebec Cinema Awards	Yves Bélanger	14 Days, 12 Nights (14 jours 12 nuits)	
2020; 22nd Quebec Cinema Awards	Nicolas Canniccioni	Kuessipan	
2020; 22nd Quebec Cinema Awards	Josée Deshaies	A Brother's Love (La femme de mon frère)	
2020; 22nd Quebec Cinema Awards	Mathieu Laverdière	And the Birds Rained Down (Il pleuvait des oiseaux)	
2020; 22nd Quebec Cinema Awards	André Turpin	Matthias & Maxime	
2021; 23rd Quebec Cinema Awards
2021; 23rd Quebec Cinema Awards	Mathieu Laverdière	Underground (Souterrain)	
2021; 23rd Quebec Cinema Awards	Jonathan Decoste	Goddess of the Fireflies (La déesse des mouches à feu)	
2021; 23rd Quebec Cinema Awards	François Gamache	The Vinland Club (Le club Vinland)	
2021; 23rd Quebec Cinema Awards	Sara Mishara	My Salinger Year (Mon année Salinger)	
2021; 23rd Quebec Cinema Awards	Tobie Marier Robitaille	Night of the Kings (La nuit des rois)	
2022; 24th Quebec Cinema Awards
2022; 24th Quebec Cinema Awards	Sara Mishara	Drunken Birds (Les oiseaux ivres)	
2022; 24th Quebec Cinema Awards	Steve Asselin	The Time Thief (L'arracheuse de temps)	
2022; 24th Quebec Cinema Awards	Simran Dewan	No Trace (Nulle trace)	
2022; 24th Quebec Cinema Awards	Michel La Veaux	Maria Chapdelaine	
2022; 24th Quebec Cinema Awards	Sara Mishara	Norbourg	
2023; 25th Quebec Cinema Awards
2023; 25th Quebec Cinema Awards	Sara Mishara	Viking	
2023; 25th Quebec Cinema Awards	Steve Asselin	The Dishwasher (Le Plongeur)	
2023; 25th Quebec Cinema Awards	Vincent Biron	Red Rooms (Les Chambres rouges)	
2023; 25th Quebec Cinema Awards	Kristof Brandl	Falcon Lake	
2023; 25th Quebec Cinema Awards	Josée Deshaies	Babysitter	
2024; 26th Quebec Cinema Awards
2024; 26th Quebec Cinema Awards	André Turpin	The Nature of Love (Simple comme Sylvain)	
2024; 26th Quebec Cinema Awards	Steve Asselin	1995	
2024; 26th Quebec Cinema Awards	André Dufour	Tell Me Why These Things Are So Beautiful (Dis-moi pourquoi ces choses sont si belles)	
2024; 26th Quebec Cinema Awards	Vincent Gonneville	Hunting Daze (Jour de chasse)	
2024; 26th Quebec Cinema Awards	Mathieu Laverdière	Solo	
2024; 26th Quebec Cinema Awards	Jean-François Lord	Ru	
2024; 26th Quebec Cinema Awards	Shawn Pavlin	Humanist Vampire Seeking Consenting Suicidal Person (Vampire humaniste cherche suicidaire consentant)	
2025; 27th Quebec Cinema Awards
2025; 27th Quebec Cinema Awards	Vincent Gonneville	Shepherds (Bergers)	
2025; 27th Quebec Cinema Awards	Olivier Gossot	Peak Everything (Amour apocalypse)	
2025; 27th Quebec Cinema Awards	Mathieu Laverdière	The Last Meal (Le Dernier repas)	
2025; 27th Quebec Cinema Awards	Sara Mishara	Two Women (Deux femmes en or)	
2025; 27th Quebec Cinema Awards	Isabelle Stachtchenko	Universal Language (Une langue universelle)	

== Multiple wins and nominations ==
=== Multiple wins ===
Wins	Cinematographer
7	André Turpin
3	Pierre Mignot
3	Sara Mishara
2	Yves Bélanger
2	Nicolas Bolduc
2	Alain Dostie
2	Pierre Gill

=== Three or more nominations ===
Nominations	Cinematographer
13	André Turpin
10	Sara Mishara
8	Steve Asselin
6	Nicolas Bolduc
6	Mathieu Laverdière
5	Pierre Gill
5	Michel La Veaux
4	Yves Bélanger
4	Bernard Couture
4	Daniel Jobin
4	Pierre Mignot
3	Josée Deshaies
3	Alain Dostie
3	Guy Dufaux
3	Nathalie Moliavko-Visotzky
3	Ronald Plante

== Combined totals for Best Cinematography and Best Cinematography in a Documentary ==
=== Multiple wins ===
Wins	Cinematographer
7	André Turpin
3	Pierre Mignot
3	Sara Mishara
2	Yves Bélanger
2	Nicolas Bolduc
2	Alain Dostie
2	Pierre Gill
2	Mathieu Laverdière

=== Three or more nominations ===
Nominations	Cinematographer
13	André Turpin
10	Sara Mishara
8	Steve Asselin
6	Nicolas Bolduc
6	Mathieu Laverdière
5	Pierre Gill
5	Michel La Veaux
4	Yves Bélanger
4	Bernard Couture
4	Josée Deshaies
4	Daniel Jobin
4	François Messier-Rheault
4	Pierre Mignot
4	Étienne Roussy
3	Nicolas Canniccioni
3	Alain Dostie
3	Guy Dufaux
3	Nathalie Moliavko-Visotzky
3	Ronald Plante
3	Tobie Marier Robitaille

== See also ==
- Canadian Screen Award for Best Cinematography
