= 5th Jutra Awards =

2003 Canadian film awards ceremony

The 5th Jutra Awards were held on February 23, 2003 to honour films made with the participation of the Quebec film industry in 2002.

Séraphin: Heart of Stone (Séraphin: un homme et son péché) received ten nominations and became the first film to receive five acting nominations and the second to receive at least one in every acting category. It also became the fourth film to receive two acting awards and the first to win both Best Actor, for Pierre Lebeau, and Best Actress, for Karine Vanasse. In total, the film won six competitive awards and the Billet d'or award.

With seven nominations, Ricardo Trogi's comedy Québec-Montréal was the night's big winner, receiving four awards in major categories: Best Film, Best Director, Best Screenplay and Best Supporting Actress for Isabelle Blais.

Luc Picard and Karine Vanasse became the first actors to win two acting awards. Picard previously won Best Actor for February 15, 1839 (15 février 1839) while Vanasse previously won Best Actress for Set Me Free (Emporte-moi).

== Winners and nominees ==
Best Film	Best Director
Québec-Montréal — Nicole Robert; The Collector (Le collectionneur) — Christian Larouche, Ginette Petit; The Marsh (Le marais) — Yves Fortin; Séraphin: Heart of Stone (Séraphin: un homme et son péché) — Lorraine Richard	Ricardo Trogi, Québec-Montréal; Michael MacKenzie, The Baroness and the Pig; Robert Morin, The Negro (Le nèg'); Kim Nguyen, The Marsh (Le marais)
Best Actor	Best Actress
Pierre Lebeau, Séraphin: Heart of Stone (Séraphin : Un homme et son péché); Paul Ahmarani, The Marsh (Le marais); Roy Dupuis, Séraphin: Heart of Stone (Séraphin : Un homme et son péché); Patrice Robitaille, Québec-Montréal	Karine Vanasse, Séraphin: Heart of Stone (Séraphin : Un homme et son péché); Pascale Bussières, Chaos and Desire (La turbulence des fluides); Maude Guérin, The Collector (Le collectionneur); Marie-Chantal Perron, The Mysterious Miss C. (La mystérieuse Mademoiselle C.)
Best Supporting Actor	Best Supporting Actress
Luc Picard, The Collector (Le collectionneur); Dominic Darceuil, Inside (Histoire de pen); Rémy Girard, Séraphin: Heart of Stone (Séraphin : Un homme et son péché); Benoît Gouin, Québec-Montréal	Isabelle Blais, Québec-Montréal; Céline Bonnier, Séraphin: Heart of Stone (Séraphin : Un homme et son péché); Geneviève Bujold, Chaos and Desire (La turbulence des fluides); Patsy Gallant, Yellowknife
Best Screenplay	Best Cinematography
Jean-Philippe Pearson, Patrice Robitaille and Ricardo Trogi, Québec-Montréal; Manon Briand, Chaos and Desire (La turbulence des fluides); Robert Morin, The Negro (Le nèg'); Kim Nguyen, The Marsh (Le marais)	Jean Lépine, Séraphin: Heart of Stone (Séraphin: un homme et son péché); Éric Cayla, The Baroness and the Pig; David Franco, Chaos and Desire (La turbulence des fluides); Daniel Vincelette, The Marsh (Le marais)
Best Art Direction	Best Sound
Ronald Fauteux, Jean Becotte and Michèle Hamel, Séraphin: Heart of Stone (Séraphin: un homme et son péché); Monique Dion and Francesca Chamberland, The Marsh (Le marais); Michel Marsolais and Lyse Bédard, North Station (Station Nord); Michel Proulx and François Barbeau, Alice's Odyssey (L'odyssée d'Alice Tremblay)	Patrick Rousseau, Claude Beaugrand, Hans Peter Strobl and Bernard Gariépy Strobl, Séraphin: Heart of Stone (Séraphin: un homme et son péché); Serge Beauchemin, Louis Dupire, Hans Peter Strobl and Bernard Gariépy Strobl, The Collector (Le collectionneur); Yvon Benoît, Marie-Claude Gagné and Gavin Fernandes, Alice's Odyssey (L'odyssée d'Alice Tremblay); Bobby O'Malley, Denis Saindon, Gavin Fernandes and Philippe Pelletier, Inside (Histoire de pen)
Best Editing	Best Original Music
Lorraine Dufour, The Negro (Le nèg'); Jean-François Bergeron, The Mysterious Miss C. (La mystérieuse Mademoiselle C.); Hélène Girard, Karmen Geï; Denis Papillon, The Baroness and the Pig	Michel Cusson, Séraphin: Heart of Stone (Séraphin: un homme et son péché); Pierre Desrochers and Nathalie Boileau, Québec-Montréal; Gilles Grégoire, Inside (Histoire de pen); Robert Marcel Lepage, Yellowknife
Best Live Short	Best Animated Short
Hit and Run – Richard Jutras; Aspiration — Constant Mentzas; The City Without Windows — Julien Fonfrede and Karim Hussain; Song — Karl R. Hearne	The Brainwashers (Les ramoneurs cérébraux) – Patrick Bouchard; Antagonia — Nicolas Brault; Flux - Christopher Hinton; The Hungry Squid — John Weldon
Best Documentary	Special Awards
A Falconer's Chronicle (Rien sans pennes) — Marc Girard; Les derniers chasseurs du petit havre — Dominique Morissette and Catherine Pappas; The Library: Between a Rock and a Hard Place (La bibliothèque entre deux feux) — Serge Cardinal; My Eye for a Camera (Mon œil pour une caméra) — Denys Desjardins	Jutra Hommage: Rock Demers; Most Successful Film Outside Quebec: Chaos and Desire (La turbulences des fluides); Billet d'or: Séraphin: Heart of Stone (Séraphin: un homme et son péché)

== Multiple wins and nominations ==
=== Films with multiple nominations ===
Nominations	Film
10	Séraphin: Heart of Stone (Séraphin: un homme et son péché)
7	Québec-Montréal
6	The Marsh (Le marais)
4	Chaos and Desire (La turbulence des fluides)
4	The Collector (Le collectionneur)
3	The Baroness and the Pig
3	Inside (Histoire de pen)
3	The Negro (Le nèg')
2	Alice's Odyssey (L'odyssée d'Alice Tremblay)
2	The Mysterious Miss C. (La mystérieuse Mademoiselle C.)
2	Yellowknife

=== Films with multiple wins ===
Wins	Film
7	Séraphin: Heart of Stone (Séraphin: un homme et son péché)
4	Québec-Montréal
