= Inseparables =

Inseparables may refer to:

- The Inseparables, a 1929 British film directed by Adelqui Migliar and John Stafford
- Inséparables (1999 film), a French film directed by Michel Couvelard
- Inséparables (2000 film), a Canadian film directed by Normand Bergeron
- Inseparables (2016 film), an Argentine film directed by Marcos Carnevale
