= L'Album du peuple – Tome 3 =

L'Album du peuple - Tome 3

Studio album by François Pérusse
- Released: 1994
- Genre: Comedy
- Label: Zéro Musique
- Producer: François Pérusse

François Pérusse chronology
L'Album du peuple - Tome 2	L'Album du peuple - Tome 3	L'Album du peuple - Tome 4

L'Album du peuple – Tome 3 is the third comedy album from François Pérusse.

== Track listing ==
1. "Intro"
2. "Carrières et professions"
3. "Sagouine'N Roses"
4. "Dans le derrière du micro"
5. "Les Gypsys cognent"
6. "Soyons diplomates"
7. "Centre d'achats 1"
8. "Pauvre père Noël"
9. "Centre d'achats 2"
10. "Kick en stock"
11. "Caroline"
