= Louis Archambault =

Canadian sculptor (1915-2003)

- Born: April 4, 1915; Montreal, Quebec
- Died: January 27, 2003 (aged 87)
- Resting place: Notre Dame des Neiges Cemetery
- Education: BA, University of Montreal in 1936 and a diploma in ceramics from the École des Beaux Arts, Montreal in 1939
- Known for: Sculptor

Louis Archambault (French pronunciation: [lwi aʁʃɑ̃bo]; April 4, 1915 – January 27, 2003) was a Quebec sculptor and ceramicist, who was one of the members of the "new sculpture" movement in Canada that moved away from traditional methods towards abstraction.

== Career ==
Born in Montreal, Quebec, he received his BA from the University of Montreal in 1936 and a diploma in ceramics from the École des Beaux Arts, Montreal in 1939, becoming an instructor in sculpture at the École in 1949. In 1952, he exhibited his work at the then Art Gallery of Toronto with Alfred Pellan. In 1953, he won a Canadian Government Fellowship to study in Paris and Venice. In 1956, works by Archambault along with those of Jack Shadbolt and Harold Town represented Canada at the Venice Biennale. He was commissioned in 1957 to make a ceramic wall for the Canadian pavilion at the Brussels International and Universal Exposition in 1958. In 1958, he won the Royal Architectural Institute of Canada's Allied Arts Medal.

His work is in such public collections in Canada as the National Gallery of Canada, the Art Gallery of Ontario and the Robert McLaughlin Gallery in Oshawa. His completed commissions include sculptures for the Pearson International Airport, Malton, Ontario; the Ottawa airport; Expo ’67, Montreal and Queen`s Park, Toronto. He was a member of the Royal Canadian Academy of Arts. In 1968, he was made an Officer of the Order of Canada.

He was the subject of Searching for Louis Archambault (À la recherche de Louis Archambault), a 2000 documentary film by Werner Volkmer.

After his death in 2003, he was entombed at the Notre Dame des Neiges Cemetery in Montreal.
