= Life After Love (disambiguation) =

"Life after love" is a lyric in Cher's 1998 song "Believe".

Life After Love may also refer to:

- Life After Love (film), a 2000 romantic comedy
- Life After Love, a pair of extended plays by Victoria Monét

== See also ==
- "Is There Life After Love?", a song from Shania Twain's album The Woman in Me
