= L'Album du peuple – Tome 1 =

L'Album du peuple - Tome 1

Studio album by François Pérusse
- Released: 1991
- Genre: Comedy
- Length: 1:03:29
- Label: Zéro Musique
- Producer: François Pérusse

François Pérusse chronology
L'Album du peuple - Tome 1	L'Album du peuple - Tome 2

L'Album du peuple – Tome 1 is the first comedy album from François Pérusse. He received a Félix award for his work.

== Track listing ==
The first release of the album contained two tracks that were removed in later reissues for copyright issues: Fadeli Fadela, and Les Simpsons passent au Bart, which parodied Gypsy Woman (She's Homeless) and Do the Bartman respectively.

1. "Bonjour la terre" - 2:56
2. "Les médias" - 10:56
3. "Le rap du mille-pattes" - 2:31
4. "Dites-le avec une chanson" - 8:14
5. "La Bolduc du jour" - 2:24
6. "Le royaume des animaux" - 7:58
7. "Cette chère culture" - 12:30
8. "Hymne au printemps II" - 2:34
9. "Le peuple et la consommation" - 9:49
10. "Le reggae du pourri" - 2:29
11. "Bye bye le peuple" - 1:08
