= Les Invincibles =

- Les Invincibles 1st ssn. DVD Cover
- Created by: François Létourneau (Writer); Jean-François Rivard (Director and writer)
- Starring: Pierre-François Legendre; François Létourneau; Rémi-Pierre Paquin; Patrice Robitaille; Catherine Trudeau
- Country of origin: Canada
- No. of episodes: 12 (season 1); 12 (season 2); 11 (season 3); 35 (total)

Production
- Running time: 43 minutes approximate

Original release
- Network: Radio-Canada
- Release: September 14, 2005 – March 25, 2009

Les Invincibles is a comedy/drama television series from Radio-Canada produced by Casablanca Productions and Alliance Atlantis Vivafilm.

The story is about four men in their early thirties signing a pact ordaining the simultaneous break-up of their current relationships, and the subsequent adoption of a common responsibility-free life.

In 2006, the show won an "Olivier" for best drama series.

The third and last season ended on March 25, 2009.

A remake of the series was made in France. Filming began in Strasbourg in August 2008 and the show was broadcast on the Franco-German Arte network in Fall 2009.

== Cast ==
- Pierre-François Legendre : Carlos Fréchette
- François Létourneau : Pierre-Antoine « P-A » Robitaille
- Patrice Robitaille : Steve Chouinard
- Rémi-Pierre Paquin : Rémi Durocher
- Catherine Trudeau : Lyne Boisvert
- Geneviève Néron : Kathleen Samson
- Lucie Laurier : Jolène
- Amélie Bernard : Vicky
- Germain Houde : Alain Robitaille
- Louise Bombardier : Gysèle
- Isabel Richer : Jeanne Langlois
- Donald Pilon : M. Boisvert
- Marie-Laurence Moreau : Manon
- Patrick Drolet : Richard
- Sylvain Marcel : Bernard
- Robin Aubert : Damien
- Kathleen Fortin : Cynthia
- Marilyse Bourke : Marie-Ange
- Mylène Saint-Sauveur : Mélanie

== DVD releases ==
Alliance Home Entertainment has released all three seasons on DVD in Canada.

DVD name	Ep#	Region 1 (CAN)
Season 1	12	October 10, 2006
Season 2	12	October 16, 2007
Season 3	11	July 28, 2009
