= Marie-Jo Thério =

Canadian actress and musician (born 1965)

Marie-Jo Thério (born July 3, 1965, in Shediac, New Brunswick) is a Canadian actress and musician. She is most noted for her performance in the 1999 film Full Blast, for which she won the Jutra Award for Best Supporting Actress at the 3rd Jutra Awards in 2001.

Raised in Shediac and Moncton, she moved to Montreal at age 17 to pursue work as a musician and actress. She appeared in Michel Tremblay's musical play Nelligan in 1990, in the television series Chambres en ville in 1991 and in the film Forbidden Love: The Unashamed Stories of Lesbian Lives in 1992 before releasing her debut album Comme de la musique in 1995.

In 2006 she won the Félix Award for Folk Album of the Year for her album Les matins habitables.

== Filmography ==
=== Film ===
Year	Title	Role	Notes
1992	Forbidden Love: The Unashamed Stories of Lesbian Lives	Beth	Documentary
1999	Full Blast	Marie-Lou	
2002	The Book of Eve	Jeanne LeBlanc	
2014	The Outlaw League	Marie-Jeanne	

=== Television ===
Year	Title	Role	Notes
1991–1995	Chambres en ville	Laura Cyr	40 episodes
2018	In Decline	Yolande Leblanc	7 episodes

== Discography ==
- 1995: Comme de la musique
- 2000: La Maline
- 2004: Les Matins habitables
- 2011: Chasing Lydie
- 2014: Trois petits tours d'automne
