= Guillaume Lambert =

Canadian actor and filmmaker

- Born: January 31, 1984 (age 42)
- Occupations: actor, writer, filmmaker
- Years active: 2000s-present
- Known for: L'Âge adulte, Niagara

Guillaume Lambert (born January 31, 1984) is a Canadian actor and filmmaker from Sorel-Tracy, Quebec, most noted as a writer, producer and star of the web television series Adulthood (L'Âge adulte) and director of the film Niagara.

He has also appeared in the films Gerontophilia, Life's a Bitch (Toutes des connes), Testament and So Long Pluto (Au revoir Pluton), and the television series Nouvelle adresse, Ruptures, Like-moi!, Échappées and La Confrérie.

In 2015 he published the novel Satyriasis : mes années romantiques, an autofiction about navigating contemporary dating culture as a gay man. He published his second novel, Eschatologie, in 2022.

His first feature film as a director, My Intelligent Comedy (Les scènes fortuites), was released in 2018. In 2021 he co-created and co-wrote the limited dramatic series Audrey est revenue for Club Illico. Niagara, his second feature film, was released in 2022.

He won two Gémeaux Awards in 2022, for Best Supporting Actor in a Comedy for La Confrérie and Best Writing for Audrey est revenue.
