= The Marsh (2002 film) =

- French: Le Marais
- Directed by: Kim Nguyen
- Written by: Kim Nguyen
- Produced by: Yves Fortin
- Starring: Gregory Hlady; Paul Ahmarani; Gabriel Gascon
- Cinematography: Éric Cayla; Daniel Vincelette
- Edited by: Richard Comeau
- Music by: Julien Knafo; Stéphane Richer
- Production companies: Film Tonic; Productions Thalie
- Distributed by: Film Tonic
- Release date: September 9, 2002 (TIFF)
- Running time: 85 minutes
- Country: Canada
- Language: French

The Marsh (French: Le Marais) is a 2002 Canadian drama film, written and directed by Kim Nguyen. Set in Eastern Europe during the 19th century, the film stars Gregory Hlady and Paul Ahmarani as Alexandre and Ulysse, two social outcasts who settle on a haunted marsh on the outskirts of a village, but become wrongly suspected of criminal wrongdoing after a woman from the village disappears.

The film's cast also includes Gabriel Gascon, Karina Aktouf, James Hyndman, Réal Bossé and Alex Ivanovici.

The film premiered at the 2002 Toronto International Film Festival.

Gascon received a Genie Award nomination for Best Supporting Actor at the 23rd Genie Awards. The film received six Prix Jutra nominations at the 5th Jutra Awards, for Best Film, Best Director (Nguyen), Best Actor (Ahmarani), Best Screenplay (Nguyen), Best Cinematography (Éric Cayla and Daniel Vincelette), and Best Art Direction (Monique Dion).
