= Olivette Thibault =

Canadian actress

Olivette Thibault (November 13, 1914 – December 17, 1995) was a Canadian stage, film and television actress from Quebec. She is most noted for her role as Tante Cécile in Mon oncle Antoine, for which she won the Canadian Film Award for Best Supporting Actress in 1971.

Her other roles included the films Deliver Us from Evil (Délivrez-nous du mal), Kamouraska and Cordélia, and the television series Quelle famille!, La p'tite semaine, Peau de banane and The Mills of Power (Les Tisserands du pouvoir).
