= Lionel Villeneuve =

Lionel Villeneuve (April 9, 1925 - November 30, 2000) was a Canadian actor from Quebec.

Born in Roberval, Quebec, he began his career as a member of the stage troupe Compagnons de Saint-Laurent, and studied acting under François Rozet. He was best known for his performances as Jos Poulin in Mon oncle Antoine, and Léopold in the theatrical premiere of Michel Tremblay's À toi, pour toujours, ta Marie-Lou.

He was married to actress Hélène Loiselle. His final film role, the short drama film Romain et Juliette, premiered just a few weeks before his death.
