= Life's a Bitch (2013 film) =

2013 Canadian film directed by François Jaros

- Film poster
- French: Toutes des connes
- Directed by: François Jaros
- Written by: Guillaume Lambert
- Produced by: Fanny-Laure Malo; François Jaros
- Starring: Guillaume Lambert
- Cinematography: Olivier Gossot
- Edited by: François Jaros
- Production company: La Boîte à Fanny
- Release date: October 2013
- Running time: 5 minutes
- Country: Canada
- Language: French

Life's a Bitch (French: Toutes des connes) is a Canadian short comedy-drama film, directed by François Jaros and released in 2013. The film stars Guillaume Lambert as Philippe, a man struggling through a painful breakup.

The film premiered in October 2013 at the Festival Tous Écrans in Geneva, Switzerland, and had its North American premiere at the 2014 Sundance Film Festival. It was distributed commercially as the opening film to screenings of Stéphane Lapointe's feature film The Masters of Suspense (Les Maîtres du suspense).

The film won the Jutra Award for Best Live Action Short Film at the 17th Jutra Awards in 2015.
