= The Bottle (2000 film) =

- French: La bouteille
- Directed by: Alain DesRochers
- Written by: Alain DesRochers; Benoît Guichard
- Produced by: Christian Larouche; François Pouliot
- Starring: Réal Bossé; François Papineau; Jean Lapointe
- Cinematography: Yves Bélanger
- Edited by: Éric Drouin
- Music by: FM Le Sieur
- Production companies: Cinepix; YUL Films
- Distributed by: Lions Gate Films
- Release date: October 13, 2000
- Running time: 107 min.
- Country: Canada
- Language: French

The Bottle (French: La bouteille) is a Canadian comedy-drama film, directed by Alain DesRochers and released in 2000. The film stars Réal Bossé and François Papineau as Réal and François, two longtime friends who decide to recover a beer bottle, containing a paper on which they wrote down their hopes and dreams for the future, which they buried 15 years earlier in the back yard of Antoine (Jean Lapointe), a grumpy old man.

The film's cast also includes Hélène Loiselle, Pascale Bussières, Louis Champagne, Sylvie Moreau, Isabelle Brouillette and Jean-Pierre Ferland.

DesRochers received a Genie Award nomination for Best Director at the 21st Genie Awards. At the 3rd Jutra Awards, Papineau was nominated for Best Actor, Loiselle was nominated for Best Actress, and Moreau was nominated for Best Supporting Actress.
