= Two Lovers and a Bear =

- Film poster
- Directed by: Kim Nguyen
- Written by: Kim Nguyen
- Based on: an original idea by Louis Grenier
- Produced by: Roger Frappier
- Starring: Dane DeHaan; Tatiana Maslany; John Ralston; Kakki Peter
- Cinematography: Nicolas Bolduc
- Edited by: Richard Comeau
- Music by: Jesse Zubot
- Production companies: Les Films Séville; Entertainment One; TF1 International; TAJJ Media; Max Films; JoBro Productions; North Creative Films
- Distributed by: Entertainment One
- Release dates: May 18, 2016 (Cannes); October 7, 2016 (Canada)
- Running time: 96 minutes
- Country: Canada
- Language: English
- Budget: $8.2 million

Two Lovers and a Bear is a 2016 Canadian drama film written and directed by Kim Nguyen and starring Tatiana Maslany and Dane DeHaan. It was screened in the Directors' Fortnight section at the 2016 Cannes Film Festival. The film was released on 7 October 2016, by Entertainment One. It is Gordon Pinsent's final feature film.

== Plot ==
The film follows the lives of Roman and Lucy, two people living difficult lives in a small, frozen town of Apex, Nunavut, Canada. They are in love, but Lucy tells Roman that she must leave as a stalker has followed her. Roman tells her that he cannot leave and go south again, because of dark things in his own past. He tries to get her to go without him, and is even pushed to the brink of suicide. Eventually, he knows that he must go with her.

Roman can talk to bears which only he, it seems, can hear talking back, and a polar bear who talks to him about life makes several appearances in the story. On their snowmobile journey south, they are warned of a blizzard, but seek shelter in an abandoned military base instead of going back. Lucy comes to believe that her stalker has followed them there. It is then revealed that the stalker is in her mind, her dead abusive father. Roman burns the military base in order to prove that her father is now dead forever and can no longer follow her.

Seeking shelter in a snow cave, Roman and Lucy talk about a herd of caribou that they had found frozen in a lake earlier in their journey. They compare their lives to these animals, being led on a path and unable to get off, with all of them drowning. As the lovers begin to succumb to the intense temperature, the bear appears again, revealing that he is God and promising to Roman that he and Lucy will see each other again. The final scene shows the lovers' now dead, frozen bodies being cut out of the snow and lifted away by a helicopter.

== Cast ==
- Dane DeHaan as Roman
- Tatiana Maslany as Lucy
- Gordon Pinsent as Bear (voice)
- John Ralston as Lucy's Father
- Johnny Issaluk as Charlie
- Kakki Peter as John Tovok

== Development ==
The film was first announced on 18 March 2015. TF1 International have acquired the worldwide distribution rights.

=== Filming ===
Filming began on 17 March 2015. Images were released from the set on 25 May 2015. The film's budget is $8.2 million. The filmmakers asked Iqaluit City Council to turn off street lights whilst they were filming because they did not want the orange hue that they gave off, instead wanting their own brighter, whiter lights. This involved manually disconnecting each lamppost. Scenes with the bear were filmed in Porcupine, Ontario (northern Ontario near Timmins).

== Release ==
The film had its world premiere at the 2016 Cannes Film Festival on 18 May 2016. The film went onto screen at the Toronto International Film Festival on 9 September 2016. Shortly after, 20th Century Fox and Netflix acquired U.S distribution rights to the film, making it the first Canadian film to be released in the United States by a major film studio since Splice. The film was released in Canada on 7 October 2016. Executive producer Jeff Sackman told Playback Daily that Fox is targeting a Valentine’s Day 2017 release, though he offered no further details on when the film would be made available on Netflix. The U.S release date was changed to 16 December 2016 in order to qualify for the Oscars.

== Reception ==
=== Critical response ===
The film received critical acclaim. On review aggregator website Rotten Tomatoes, it has an approval rating of 87% based on 23 reviews, with an average rating of 6.6/10. The website's critical consensus reads, "Two Lovers and a Bear's absurdly philosophical story is brought to life by the magnetic chemistry between Tatiana Maslany and Dane DeHaan." Metacritic gives the film a weighted average score of 61 out of 100, based on 12 critics, indicating "generally favorable reviews".

Sheri Linden in the Los Angeles Times calls the film "thrillingly cinematic", however, notes that not all of the plot lines work equally, and the conversations between Roman and Lucy may be more important than the plot lines.

Christy Lemire from RogerEbert.com said the film was "Beautiful and thoroughly unpredictable; you never know where Nguyen is going with this story, including the chilling, sci-fi/horror direction he heads in toward the film's climax."

Glenn Kenny of The New York Times was quoted as saying the film has "beauty", but noted that it had an "overheated romanticism".

Liz Braun of the Toronto Sun said "There's a surreal quality to Two Lovers and a Bear that gets underlined by the appearance of the Ursus maritimus of the title; DeHaan has called the movie an adult fairy tale, and that's an apt description."

Simon Houpt from The Globe and Mail wrote "Viewers have two choices: Give yourself over to the experience, and you'll be transported; stand back, and you'll feel nothing but chill."

=== Accolades ===
Award	Date of ceremony	Category	Recipient(s)	Result	Ref.
Canadian Screen Awards	12 March 2017	Best Art Direction / Production Design	Emmanuel Fréchette	Won	
Canadian Screen Awards	12 March 2017	Best Editing	Richard Comeau	Won	
Canadian Screen Awards	12 March 2017	Best Make-Up	Kathryn Casault	Nominated	
Canadian Screen Awards	12 March 2017	Best Score	Jesse Zubot	Nominated	
Directors Guild of Canada	28 October 2017	Outstanding Directorial Achievement in Feature Film	Kim Nguyen	Nominated	
Prix Iris	4 June 2017	Best Film	Roger Frappier	Nominated	
Prix Iris	4 June 2017	Best Director	Kim Nguyen	Nominated	
Prix Iris	4 June 2017	Best Screenplay	Kim Nguyen	Nominated	
Prix Iris	4 June 2017	Best Actress	Tatiana Maslany	Nominated	
Prix Iris	4 June 2017	Best Actor	Dane DeHaan	Nominated	
Prix Iris	4 June 2017	Revelation of the Year	Kakki Peter	Nominated	
Prix Iris	4 June 2017	Best Casting	Lucie Robitaille and Heidi Levitt	Nominated	
Prix Iris	4 June 2017	Best Cinematography	Nicolas Bolduc	Nominated	
Prix Iris	4 June 2017	Best Sound	Claude Beaugrand, Bernard Gariépy Strobl, and Claude La Haye	Won	
Prix Iris	4 June 2017	Best Editing	Richard Comeau	Won	
Prix Iris	4 June 2017	Best Visual Effects	Daniel Lavoie and André Montambeault	Nominated	
Prix Iris	4 June 2017	Most Successful Film Outside Quebec	Kim Nguyen	Nominated	
Writers Guild of Canada	24 April 2017	WGC Award	Kim Nguyen	Nominated	
