= Gabriel Gascon =

Canadian stage and film actor (1927–2018)

- Occupation: Actor

Gabriel Gascon (8 January 1927 – 30 May 2018) was a Canadian stage and film actor.

Born in Montreal, Quebec to parents Charles-Auguste Gascon and Marie-Rose Dubuc, Gascon began his acting career after joining the Compagnons de Saint-Laurent with the help of his elder brother Jean. Gascon established his career in France, where he met Andrée Lachapelle. He died on 30 May 2018, aged 91.

He was also the brother of filmmaker Gilles Gascon.

== Partial filmography ==
- Étienne Brûlé gibier de potence (1952) - Janedo
- Les Belles Histoires des pays d'en haut (1956–1963, TV Series) - Alexis Labranche
- If I Were a Spy (1967)
- The Aeronauts (1967, TV Series) - Louis Gagnon
- The Return of Monte Cristo (1968) - Louis - le père de Linda
- The Sergeant (1968) - Paul - Solange's Brother-in-Law (uncredited)
- Les camisards (1972) - Capitaine Alexandre Poul
- La Menace (1977) - Pannequin
- The Suspended Vocation (1978) - Le père-confesseur
- The Hypothesis of the Stolen Painting (1978) - Personnage des Tableaux
- Lucien Brouillard (1983)
- The Tin Flute (1983) - Cure
- Sous les draps, les étoiles (1989)
- Phantom Life (La vie fantôme) (1992) - Lautier
- Cap Tourmente (1993) - Monsieur Simon
- Matusalem (1993) - Captain Monbars
- Mrs. Parker and the Vicious Circle (1994) - Georges Attends
- Le silence des fusils (1996) - Pere Philbert
- Cosmos (1996) - Crépuscule
- Les mille merveilles de l'univers (1997) - Marshal Vega
- Sucre amer (1998) - Le président
- Nuremberg (2000, TV Mini-Series) - Großadmiral Erich Raeder
- Possible Worlds (2000) - Kleber / Doctor
- Romain et Juliette (2000) - Paul
- Marriages (2001) - Chanteur
- Looking for Leonard (2002) - Martin
- The Marsh (Le Marais) (2002)
- Au fil de l'eau (2002) - Bernard
- The Little Book of Revenge (2006) - Vendôme
- The Dead Water (Les eaux mortes) (2006)
- Black Eyed Dog (2006)
- Adam's Wall (2008) - Rabbi Levy
- Mars and April (2012) - Arlequin (final film role)
