= David Boutin (actor) =

Canadian actor

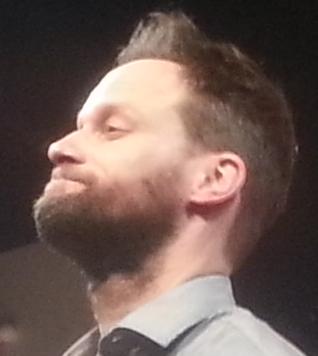
- Boutin in 2017
- Born: November 12, 1969 (age 56); Montreal, Quebec, Canada
- Occupation: Actor
- Years active: 1990s-present
- Known for: The Long Winter, Hochelaga

David Boutin (born November 12, 1969) is a Canadian actor from Quebec. He is most noted for his performance in the 2000 film Hochelaga, for which he won the Jutra Award for Best Supporting Actor at the 3rd Jutra Awards in 2001.

His other credits have included the films The Countess of Baton Rouge (La Comtesse de Bâton Rouge), The Long Winter (Quand je serai parti... vous vivrez encore), Marriages (Mariages), On Your Head (Le Ciel sur la tête), Inside (Histoire de pen), Seducing Doctor Lewis (La Grande séduction), Tideline (Littoral), Black Eyed Dog, A Family Secret (Le Secret de ma mère), The Broken Line (La Ligne brisée), Je me souviens, Trash (Décharge) and 1:54, and the television series Diva, Tag, Temps dur, H_{2}O, Human Trafficking, Rumeurs, Tout sur moi, Nouvelle adresse, District 31 and Les Pays d'en haut.
