= The Baroness and the Pig =

- Directed by: Michael Mackenzie
- Written by: Michael Mackenzie
- Produced by: Daniel Langlois
- Starring: Patricia Clarkson; Colm Feore; Caroline Dhavernas; Louise Marleau
- Cinematography: Éric Cayla
- Edited by: Denis Papillon
- Music by: Philip Glass
- Production companies: Film Tonic; Media Principia; Wide Angle Pictures
- Release date: September 8, 2002 (TIFF)
- Running time: 95 minutes
- Country: Canada
- Languages: English; French

The Baroness and the Pig is a Canadian drama film, directed by Michael Mackenzie and released in 2002. Based on Mackenzie's own stage play, the film stars Patricia Clarkson as The Baroness, a Quaker woman from Philadelphia who moves to Paris with her husband, The Baron (Colm Feore) in the 1880s; however, her egalitarian ideals conflict with the elitism of Parisian society, particularly when she launches a plan to rehabilitate and bring into society a wild girl (Caroline Dhavernas) who was raised in a pig sty, leading The Duchess (Louise Marleau) to attempt to engineer The Baroness's downfall.

The film premiered on September 8, 2002 at the 2002 Toronto International Film Festival. It was screened under an experimental model, by which instead of a traditional film print being projected in a standard manner, the film was digitally transmitted via satellite from its producers' offices in Montreal to the theatre.

== Critical response ==
Liam Lacey of The Globe and Mail rated the film two stars, writing that "Handsome to look at, hard to digest, The Baroness and the Pig is an allegorical costume drama that feels something like Pygmalion (Pigmalion?) as adapted by Peter Greenaway. The film shares Greenaway's production designer, Ben Van Os, and his penchant for titled chapters, technology and dialogue about culture. With apparent narrative influences from Henry James to François Truffaut's The Wild Child to Jean Genet's The Maids, the film is fairly dry chewing. More fun might have been expected in a story about a young woman who grows up in a pig sty to serve in a fancy French kitchen."

Ken Eisner of The Georgia Straight heavily criticized the film, writing that "This stunningly undernourished drama, shot in Quebec City and Budapest but set in 1880s Paris, is the kind of international hash-up that gives coproduction treaties a bad name. Even the ubiquitous Patricia Clarkson, who normally elevates anything she's in, comes out looking bad, as she appears to have been directed to play as a comedy what everyone else had been told is a tawdry melodrama."

== Awards ==
The film received three Jutra Award nominations at the 5th Jutra Awards in 2002, for Best Director (Mackenzie), Best Cinematography (Éric Cayla) and Best Editing (Denis Papillon).
