= Glauco Bermudez =

Mexican-Canadian cinematographer

Glauco Bermudez is a Mexican Canadian cinematographer. He is most noted for his work on the 2016 film Before the Streets (Avant les rues), for which he was nominated for both the Canadian Screen Award for Best Cinematography and the Prix Iris for Best Cinematography, and the 2020 film Influence, for which he was nominated for the Canadian Screen Award for Best Cinematography in a Documentary.

Originally from Mexico City, Bermudez moved to Montreal, Quebec to study cinematography at the Mel Hoppenheim School of Cinema. He remains based in Montreal, but has continued to work in both Canadian and Mexican cinema.

His other credits have included the films Woman in Car, Twice Colonized, So Surreal: Behind the Masks, Ghosts of the Sea (Les Enfants du large), Kanaval, Shifting Baselines and Saigon Story: Two Shootings in the Forest Kingdom.
