= Dominic Darceuil =

Canadian actor and artist from Quebec

Dominic Darceuil (born March 20, 1972) is a Canadian actor and artist from Quebec. He is most noted for his role as Lucia in Inside (Histoire de pen), for which he received a Genie Award nomination for Best Supporting Actor at the 23rd Genie Awards and a Prix Jutra nomination for Best Supporting Actor at the 5th Jutra Awards.

He also appeared in the films Love Me, Love Me Not (J'aime, j'aime pas), Hochelaga and The Barbarian Invasions (Les Invasions barbares), and the television series Radio Enfer and Rivière-des-Jérémie.
