= Full Blast (film) =

- Theatrical release poster
- Directed by: Rodrigue Jean
- Written by: Nathalie Loubeyre
- Based on: L'Ennemi que je connais by Martin Pitre
- Produced by: Ian Boyd
- Starring: David La Haye; Martin Desgagné; Louise Portal; Marie-Jo Thério; Patrice Godin
- Cinematography: Stefan Ivanov
- Edited by: Mathieu Bouchard-Malo
- Music by: Robert Marcel Lepage
- Distributed by: K-Films Amérique
- Release date: September 13, 1999 (TIFF)
- Running time: 95 minutes
- Country: Canada
- Language: French

Full Blast is a 1999 film by Canadian director Rodrigue Jean, his first long feature. Filmed in Bathurst, New Brunswick, the film was written by Nathalie Loubeyre as an adaptation of Martin Pitre's novel L'Ennemi que je connais. It was the first French-language feature film funded by Film New Brunswick, the provincial film development agency.

The film had its theatrical premiere at the 1999 Toronto International Film Festival, before going into general theatrical release in early 2000.

== Plot ==
A strike at a sawmill in a small fictional community in New Brunswick puts Steph (David La Haye) and Piston (Martin Desgagné) out of work. They want to resurrect their band Lost Tribe, but Marie-Lou (Marie-Jo Thério), Piston's ex-wife and the band's former lead singer, is not enthusiastic about the idea.

Meanwhile, the bisexual Steph is having relationship trouble with Rose (Louise Portal), an older woman that he's been seeing and drifts first to Marie-Lou and then to Charles (Patrice Godin), who once left town but is now back.

== Cast ==
- David La Haye as Steph
- Martin Desgagné as Piston
- Louise Portal as Rose
- Marie-Jo Thério as Marie-Lou
- Patrice Godin as Charles
- Daniel Desjardins as Chico
- Luc Proulx as Steph's Father
- Danica Arsenault as Juliette
- Channon Roe 'Razor'

== Awards ==
At the Toronto International Film Festival, the film received an honorable mention from the Best Canadian First Feature Film jury.

The film received four Prix Jutra nominations at the 3rd Jutra Awards in 2001, for Best Actor (La Haye), Best Actress (Portal), Best Supporting Actress (Thério) and Best Original Music (Robert Marcel Lepage). Thério won the award for Best Supporting Actress.
