= In Store =

2002 Canadian film

- French: En magasin
- Directed by: Mario Bonenfant
- Written by: Mario Bonenfant
- Produced by: Raymond Gravelle
- Starring: Jacques L'Heureux; Johanne-Marie Tremblay; Julie Deslauriers
- Cinematography: Denis-Noël Mostert
- Edited by: Claudette Duff
- Music by: Mathieu Vanasse
- Production company: Les Productions La Gauchet
- Release date: October 2002 (FNC)
- Running time: 11 minutes
- Country: Canada
- Language: French

In Store (French: En magasin) is a Canadian short drama film, directed by Mario Bonenfant and released in 2002. The film centres on a family of sentient department store mannequins, whose world is disrupted when the daughter expresses a desire to leave the store and see the real world.

The film stars Jacques L'Heureux as the father, Johanne-Marie Tremblay as the mother, and Julie Deslauriers as the daughter.

The film premiered at the 2002 Festival du nouveau cinéma.

The film was a Genie Award nominee for Best Live Action Short Drama at the 23rd Genie Awards.
