= Hochelaga (film) =

- Directed by: Michel Jetté
- Written by: Michel Jetté
- Produced by: Michel Jetté; Louise Sabourin
- Starring: Dominic Darceuil; David Boutin; Ronald Houle; Michel Charette
- Cinematography: Larry Lynn
- Music by: Gilles Grégoire
- Distributed by: Cinéma Libre
- Release date: September 1, 2000
- Running time: 130 min.
- Country: Canada
- Language: French
- Budget: $1 million

Hochelaga is a French language Canadian crime drama written and directed by Michel Jetté. Produced in the year 2000, it stars Dominic Darceuil as a young would-be criminal and his deepening involvement with an outlaw motorcycle club during the Quebec Biker war.

== Cast ==
- Dominic Darceuil ... Marc
- David Boutin ... Finger
- Ronald Houle ... Massif
- Jean-Nicolas Verreault ... Eric 'Nose' Beaupré
- Michel Charette ... Bof
- Deano Clavet ... Tatou
- Claudia Hurtubise ... Coco
- Patrick Peuvion ... Frais-Chié
- Paul Dion ... Popeye
- Michèle Péloquin ... Mère de Marc
- André Lacoste ... Stash
- Michael D'Amico ... Motton
- Catherine Trudeau ... Louise

== Awards ==
David Boutin won the Jutra Award for Best Supporting Actor at the 3rd Jutra Awards in 2001. The film was also nominated for Best Film, Best Director (Jetté), Best Screenplay (Jetté), Best Sound (Dominique Delguste), Best Editing (Jetté, Louise Sabourin) and Best Original Music (Gilles Grégoire).
