= The Left-Hand Side of the Fridge =

- French: La moitié gauche du frigo
- Directed by: Philippe Falardeau
- Written by: Philippe Falardeau
- Produced by: Luc Déry; Joseph Hillel; Josée Roberge
- Starring: Paul Ahmarani; Stéphane Demers; Geneviève Néron; Jules Philippe; Alexandrine Agostini; Marie-Andrée Corneille
- Cinematography: Josée Deshaies
- Edited by: Sophie Leblond
- Release date: 2000 (Canada)
- Running time: 90 minutes
- Country: Canada
- Language: French

The Left-Hand Side of the Fridge (French: La Moitié gauche du frigo) was the first full-length feature film by Canadian film director Philippe Falardeau, released in 2000.

== Synopsis ==
Shot in mockumentary style, the film stars Paul Ahmarani as Christophe and Stéphane Demers as Stéphane, two roommates sharing an apartment in Montreal. Christophe is an unemployed engineer, while Stéphane is a documentary filmmaker who begins filming Christophe's search for work. Christophe increasingly becomes disillusioned with the corporate world and fed up with the relentlessly intrusive nature of Stéphane and his omnipresent camera. Eventually he flees to Vancouver.

== Awards ==
The film won the award for Best Canadian First Feature Film at the 2000 Toronto International Film Festival, as well as the Claude Jutra Award for the best Canadian film by a first-time director at the 21st Genie Awards.

Ahmarani won the Jutra Award for Best Actor at the 3rd Jutra Awards in 2001. Falardeau was also nominated for Best Director and Best Screenplay, and Sophie Leblond was nominated for Best Editing.
