= François Pérusse =

- Born: François Pérusse; October 8, 1960 (age 66)
- Origin: Quebec City, Quebec, Canada
- Genres: Humour; Comedy music
- Occupations: Humorist; Singer; Songwriter; Multi-Instrumentalist
- Instruments: Vocals; Piano/keyboard; Synthesizer; Bass guitar
- Label: Zéro Musique
- Website: http://www.francoisperusse.ca/

François Pérusse (born October 8, 1960) is a Canadian comedian and musician famous for his radio sketches featuring puns and absurd humour. His best-known sketches are from the series Les 2 minutes du peuple (The Peoples' 2 Minutes).

== Biography ==
Pérusse was born to Charlotte and Adélard Pérusse. At 12 he made his debut in local radio, and by age 17 he was playing as a bassist in bands with his older brother Marc.

Les 2 minutes du peuple first aired in August 1990 on CKOI-FM as part of the program Y'é trop d'bonne heure (It's Too Early). After a little over a year, a compilation of his best sketches and songs was released, L'Album du peuple – Tome 1 (The Album of the People – Volume 1), which has sold more than 80,000 copies. Pérusse released nine more "Albums du peuple" in the main series, plus two albums in France and a spinoff titled L'Album pirate (The Pirated Album). His fourth album, which he expected to be his last and which he called L'Album du peuple final – Tome 4 (The Final Album of the People – Volume 4), sold well, prompting him to continue making albums.

Les 2 minutes du peuple made its debut in France in autumn 1995 on Europe 2 radio, with Pérusse changing his accent and vocabulary to imitate European French. His work has been broadcast in Belgium since 1998 and in Switzerland since 2002. He moved into television on February 8, 1999 with Le JourNul de François Pérusse (The LameNews by François Pérusse), a satirical news program. Animated versions of his sketches "Le Spécial du peuple" ("The Special of the People") and "La Série du peuple" ("The Series of the People") aired on the TVA network. He has released a DVD, Le DVD du peuple (The DVD of the People), containing highlights of La Série du peuple and Le JourNul de François Pérusse.

New sketches in the Les 2 minutes du peuple series air on the FM network Énergie as part of C't'encore drôle (It's Still Funny, alternatively It Could Surprise You) broadcast across Quebec. In 2006, his JourNul characters returned in a talk show style segment called On s'écoute parler (Listening to Ourselves Talking). A great Beatles fan, he was hired by the Cirque du Soleil to work on the show The Beatles: LOVE in Las Vegas.

He received three Ruban d'or from the Canadian Association of Broadcasters in the humour category.

In 2022, he had his first significant film role in his entire career, playing Alain Lamothe in the film Niagara.

== Discography ==
- 1991 : L'Album du peuple – Tome 1 (Quebec)
- 1992 : L'Album du peuple – Tome 2 (Quebec)
- 1994 : L'Album du peuple – Tome 3 (Quebec)
- 1995 : L'Album du peuple final – Tome 4 (Quebec)
- 1996 : L'Album du peuple – Tome 5 – La poursuite (Quebec)
- 1997 : L'Album du peuple – Volume 1 (Made for France) (France and Quebec)
- 2002 : L'Album du peuple – Volume 2 (Made for France) (France and Quebec)
- 2002 : L'Album pirate (Quebec) – (Platinum)
- 2003 : L'Album du peuple – Tome 6 (Quebec)
- 2004 : Le DVD du peuple (Quebec and France)
- 2007 : L'Album du peuple – Tome 7 (Quebec)
- 2011 : L'Album du peuple – Tome 8 (Quebec)
- 2013 : L'Album du peuple – Tome 9 (Quebec)
- 2015 : L'Album du peuple – Tome 10 (Quebec)
- 2017 : Best Ove! (Quebec)
- 2020 : L'Album du peuple – Tome 11 (Quebec)
- 2022 : Le EP du peuple – Numéro 1 (Quebec)

== See also ==
- Culture of Quebec
- List of Quebec comedians
