= Kim Nguyen =

Canadian film director and screenwriter (born 1974)

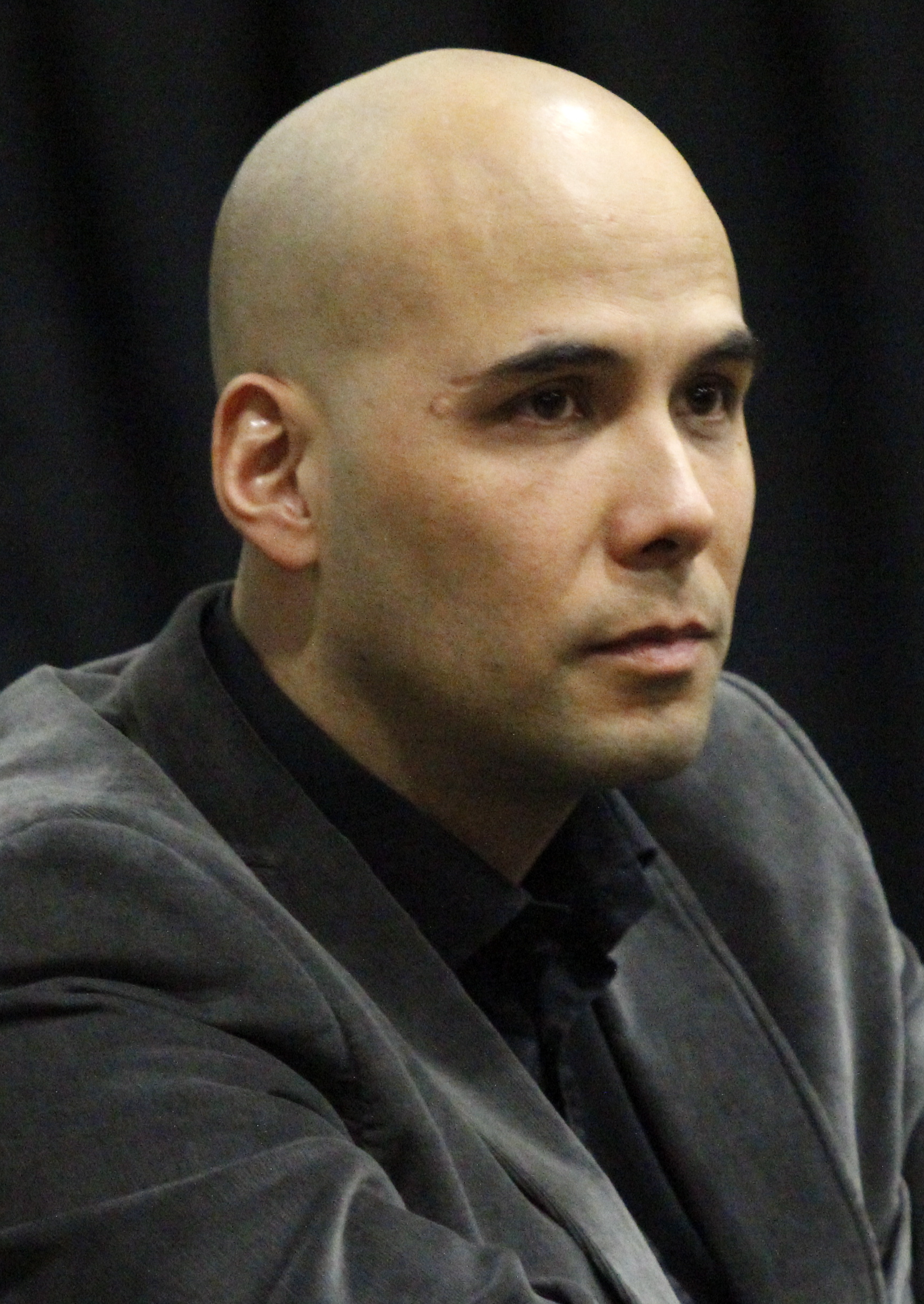
- Kim Nguyen in 2013
- Born: 1974 (age 51–52); Montreal, Quebec, Canada
- Education: Concordia University (BFA, 1997)
- Occupations: Film director, Screenwriter

Kim Nguyen (born 1974) is a Canadian film director and screenwriter, best known for his 2012 film War Witch (Rebelle) which received numerous honours including an Academy Awards nomination for Best Foreign Language Film.

== Early life ==
Born and raised in Montreal, Quebec to a Vietnamese father and a French-Canadian mother, he is a 1997 graduate of Concordia University in Montreal, having earned a BFA. His knowledge of computer-assisted image manipulation was deepened while he taught cinematographic language and screenwriting at the Institut de création artistique et de recherche en infographie (ICARI) and Collège Jean-de-Brébeuf in Montréal.

== Career ==
Nguyen has directed a number of feature films including War Witch (2012) (also known by the French title Rebelle), Eye on Juliet (2017) and The Hummingbird Project (2018). For War Witch, the film was the top winner at the 1st Canadian Screen Awards, in addition to being named Best Picture and winning acting awards for two of its stars, Nguyen himself won the awards for Best Director and Best Original Screenplay, which also earned him an Academy Awards nomination for Best Foreign Language Film. Following War Witch, Nguyen was one of 276 new members invited by the Academy of Motion Picture Arts and Sciences. In 2019 he was the patron and curator of the Festival Vues dans la tête de... film festival in Rivière-du-Loup.

In 2025 he was announced as entering production on The Hourglass (Le Sablier), an adaptation of Édith Blais's non-fiction book about her experience being captured and held hostage by Islamist terrorists while travelling in Burkina Faso. Shooting on the film commenced in April 2026.

His 2026 documentary film Saigon Story: Two Shootings in the Forest Kingdom (Une photo à Saigon : coups de feu sur deux vies) premiered at the Hot Docs Canadian International Documentary Festival, where it was the winner of the Best Canadian Feature Documentary award.

== Filmography ==
=== Films ===
==== Feature film ====
Year	Film	Original Title	Ref.
2002	The Marsh	Le Marais	
2008	Truffles	Truffe	
2010	City of Shadows	La Cité	
2012	War Witch	Rebelle	
2016	Two Lovers and a Bear	Two Lovers and a Bear	
2017	Eye on Juliet	Eye on Juliet	
2018	The Hummingbird Project	The Hummingbird Project	

==== Short film ====
Year	Film	Original Title	Ref.
2000	Soleil glacé	Soleil glacé	
2004	The Glove	Le Gant	
2012	Denis Marleau	Denis Marleau	

==== Documentary films ====
Year	Film	Original Title	Ref.
2007	Happiness Bound	Happiness Bound	
2012	Blush Of Fruit	Blush Of Fruit	
2014	The Empire Of The Scents	Le Nez	
2026	Saigon Story: Two Shootings in the Forest Kingdom	Une photo à Saigon : coups de feu sur deux vies	

=== Television ===
Year	Title	Notes	Ref.
2006	La chambre no. 13	S1, E9: Le rat	
2017	Bellevue	S1, E5: How Do I Remember? S1, E6: The Problem with the Truth	
2019	Anne with an E	S3, E2: There Is Something at Work in My Soul Which I Do Not Understand	
2022	Transplant	S2, E9: Between & E10: Shadows; S3, Episode 5: Nadir	

== Accolades ==
Awards and nominations received by Kim Nguyen
Organizations (Note: Awards, festivals, honors and other miscellaneous organizations are listed in alphabetical order.)	Year (Note: Indicates the year of ceremony. Each year is linked to the article about the awards held that year, wherever possible.)	Category	Work	Result	Ref.
Academy Awards	2013	Best Foreign Language Film	War Witch	Nominated	
Berlin International Film Festival	2012	Golden Bear	War Witch	Nominated	
Berlin International Film Festival	2012	Prize of the Ecumenical Jury – Special Mention	War Witch	Won	
Cambridge Film Festival	2012	Audience Award for Best Fiction Feature	War Witch	Won	
Canadian Screen Awards	2013	Best Director	War Witch	Won	
Canadian Screen Awards	2013	Best Screenplay	War Witch	Won	
Cinema for Peace awards	2013	Most Valuable Film of the Year	War Witch	Nominated	
Directors Guild of Canada	2017	Outstanding Directorial Achievement in Feature Film	Two Lovers and a Bear	Nominated	
Fantastic Fest	2009	Best Fantastic Director	Truffle	Won	
Film Critics Circle of Australia	2014	Best Feature Documentary	Blush of Fruit	Nominated	
Fresh Film Festival	2009	Fresh Generation	Truffle	Won	
Gala Québec Cinéma	2003	Best Director	The Marsh	Nominated	
Gala Québec Cinéma	2003	Best Screenplay	The Marsh	Nominated	
Gala Québec Cinéma	2011	Best Director	City of Shadows	Nominated	
Gala Québec Cinéma	2013	Best Director	War Witch	Won	
Gala Québec Cinéma	2013	Best Screenplay	War Witch	Won	
Gala Québec Cinéma	2013	Most Successful Film Outside Quebec	War Witch	Nominated	
Gala Québec Cinéma	2017	Best Director	Two Lovers and a Bear	Nominated	
Gala Québec Cinéma	2017	Best Screenplay	Two Lovers and a Bear	Nominated	
Gala Québec Cinéma	2017	Most Successful Film Outside Quebec	Two Lovers and a Bear	Nominated	
Independent Spirit Awards	2013	Best International Film	War Witch	Nominated	
Milwaukee Film Festival	2013	Herzfeld Competition Award	War Witch	Won	
Montreal International Black Film Festival	2013	Vanguard Award	—	Honored	
Sitges Film Festival	2012	Noves Visions Award	War Witch	Won	
Tribeca Film Festival	2012	Best Narrative Feature	War Witch	Won	
Vancouver International Film Festival	2012	Best Canadian Feature Film	War Witch	Nominated	
Venice Film Festival	2017	Venice Days – Fedeora Awards for Best Film	Eye on Juliet	Won	
Vietnamese International Film Festival	2013	Grand-Jury Trống Đồng Award for Best Feature	War Witch	Won	
World Cinema Amsterdam	2012	Audience Award	War Witch	Won	
Writers Guild of Canada	2017	Feature Film	Two Lovers and a Bear	Nominated	

== See also ==
- Asian Americans in arts and entertainment
- List of Academy Award winners and nominees of Asian descent
