= Guy Jodoin =

Canadian comedian

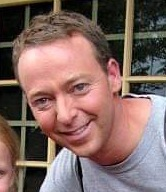
Jodoin in 2023

Guy Jodoin (born 1966 in Sherbrooke, Quebec) is a Quebec comedian. He is best known as Capitaine Charles Patenaude in Dans une galaxie près de chez vous and Sucré Salé as well as the host of TVA's game show Le Tricheur.

In 2020 he appeared in Escouade 99, the Quebec television adaptation of Brooklyn Nine-Nine. In 2022 he played the role of Victor-Hugo Lamothe in the film Niagara. His other film roles have included Mon ami Walid and Tight Lettuce (Tissé serré).
