= Guantanamera Boxe =

2000 Canadian documentary film

- Directed by: Richard Jean-Baptiste; Yann Langevin
- Written by: Yann Langevin
- Produced by: Orlando Arriagada
- Cinematography: Alex Margineanu
- Edited by: Simon Sauvé
- Music by: Gaëtan Gravel; Serge Laforest
- Production company: Productions Al Dente
- Distributed by: Antenna Films
- Release date: August 30, 2000 (FFM)
- Running time: 52 minutes
- Country: Canada
- Language: Spanish

Guantanamera Boxe is a Canadian documentary film, directed by Richard Jean-Baptiste and Yann Langevin and released in 2000. The film is a portrait of amateur boxers training in the boxing academies of Cuba.

The film premiered on August 30, 2000, at the Montreal World Film Festival, ahead of a television broadcast on Télévision de Radio-Canada on September 13.

The film was a Jutra Award nominee for Best Documentary Film at the 3rd Jutra Awards in 2001.
