= Laura Doyle =

Canadian singer

Laura Doyle is a singer-songwriter based in Vancouver, British Columbia, Canada. She has recorded two albums as an independent artist; No Easy Answers (2002) and Dark Horse (2007). The album cover of "Dark Horse" is of her own horse, Orion. Her music has been heard in the television series Dawson's Creek, Strong Medicine, Beautiful People, Cold Squad, and Missing. She can also be heard in the soundtracks of the feature films Suddenly Naked, Dead Heat, and Desolation Sound.

Doyle was nominated for Genie Awards in 2003, for two of her songs that were used in the film Suddenly Naked, including her best-known title; "Let You Go".
