= Searching for Louis Archambault =

2000 Canadian documentary film

- French: À la recherche de Louis Archambault
- Directed by: Werner Volkmer
- Written by: Werner Volkmer; Ariane Émond
- Produced by: Werner Volkmer
- Starring: Louis Archambault
- Production company: Aquilon Films
- Release date: March 2000 (IFFA)
- Running time: 50 minutes
- Country: Canada
- Language: French

Searching for Louis Archambault (French: À la recherche de Louis Archambault) is a Canadian documentary film, directed by Werner Volkmer and released in 2000. The film is a portrait of Louis Archambault, the Quebec sculptor who was one of the pioneers of abstract sculpture in Canada.

The film premiered in March 2000 at the International Festival of Films on Art in Montreal, where it was the winner of the Telefilm Canada award for Best Canadian Film. It was subsequently screened at the 2000 Hot Docs Canadian International Documentary Festival, where it won the award for Best Arts Documentary.

The film won the Jutra Award for Best Documentary Film at the 3rd Jutra Awards in 2001.
