= Normand Bergeron =

Canadian film director

Normand Bergeron (born July 31, 1963) is a Canadian filmmaker, screenwriter and academic from Quebec. He is most noted for his short film Inséparables, which was the winner of the Prix Jutra for Best Live Action Short Film at the 3rd Jutra Awards in 2001, and as one of the writers of The Vinland Club (Le Club Vinland), for which he was a Prix Iris nominee for Best Screenplay at the 23rd Quebec Cinema Awards in 2021.

He began his career in film, making the short films La Mémoire infidèle (1995), L'Hypothèse rivale (1997) and Inséparables (2000), before leaving the film industry to pursue scientific work as a biologist and professor at the Institut national de la recherche scientifique. After conceiving the idea for The Vinland Club, a film about a scientific project undertaken by a professor and his students, Bergeron approached director Benoît Pilon and screenwriter Marc Robitaille to collaborate on the film, which was released in 2020.
