= Saigon Story: Two Shootings in the Forest Kingdom =

2026 Canadian documentary film

- French: Une photo à Saigon : coups de feu sur deux vies
- Directed by: Kim Nguyen
- Produced by: Ariel Nasr; Nabil Mehchi; Robert Vroom
- Cinematography: Glauco Bermudez; Van Royko
- Edited by: Andrea Henriquez
- Music by: Mathieu Charbonneau
- Production companies: Noble Films; National Film Board of Canada
- Release date: April 29, 2026 (Hot Docs)
- Running time: 90 minutes
- Country: Canada
- Languages: English; French; Vietnamese

Saigon Story: Two Shootings in the Forest Kingdom (French: Une photo à Saigon : coups de feu sur deux vies) is a Canadian documentary film, directed by Kim Nguyen and released in 2026. The film profiles the two Vietnamese families whose lives and histories have been indelibly intertwined by Saigon Execution, the infamous photograph of a Vietnamese man being executed by a police officer during the Vietnam War.

In a personal essay for the Cutaways column on CBC Arts, Nguyen described the film's genesis in a long-dormant idea about a man whose job was to recover dead bodies and figure out who they belonged to, and how it ultimately turned into Saigon Story after he was approached about a man living in Montreal who had a personal family connection to Saigon Execution.

The film premiered at the Hot Docs Canadian International Documentary Festival, where it was the winner of the Best Canadian Feature Documentary award. It was subsequently screened at the DOXA Documentary Film Festival on May 1, where it was the winner of the Colin Low Award.
