= A Falconer's Chronicle =

2002 Canadian documentary film

- French: Rien sans pennes
- Directed by: Marc Girard
- Written by: Marc Girard
- Produced by: Marc Girard
- Cinematography: Jean-Philippe Dupuis; Marc Girard; Michel Lamothe
- Edited by: Chantal Lussier
- Production company: Les productions de la crécelle
- Distributed by: 7e art distribution
- Release date: 2002
- Running time: 65 minutes
- Country: Canada
- Language: French

A Falconer's Chronicle (French: Rien sans pennes, lit. "Nothing Without Quills") is a Canadian documentary film, directed by Marc Girard and released in 2002. The film centres on Girard's own entry into the pastime of falconry, profiling his efforts to learn how to tame and train a falcon.

The film premiered at the 2002 Abitibi-Témiscamingue International Film Festival.

The film was the winner of the Jutra Award for Best Documentary Film at the 5th Jutra Awards in 2003.
