= The Long Winter (1999 film) =

- Theatrical release poster
- French: Quand je serai parti… vous vivrez encore
- Directed by: Michel Brault
- Written by: Michel Brault
- Produced by: Anouk Brault; Claudio Luca
- Starring: Francis Reddy; David Boutin; Micheline Lanctôt; Claude Gauthier
- Cinematography: Sylvain Brault
- Edited by: Daniel Arié
- Music by: François Dompierre
- Release date: March 13, 1999
- Running time: 126 minutes
- Country: Canada
- Language: French

The Long Winter (French: Quand je serai parti… vous vivrez encore, lit. 'When I'm gone… you'll still live') is a 1999 Quebec historical drama film. Directed by Michel Brault, it is a partly fictionalized account of the Lower Canada Rebellion of 1837 and 1838 which sought to make Lower Canada, now Quebec, a republic independent from the British Empire.

== Description ==
It features the fictional character of François-Xavier Bouchard and the factual character of François-Marie-Thomas Chevalier de Lorimier. The music was composed by François Dompierre. Film director Pierre Falardeau says that Telefilm Canada initially used the approval of Brault's film as an excuse to deny funds for the film February 15, 1839. This incited him to write a second Elvis Gratton film instead.

The main protagonist is Patriote François-Xavier Bouchard. The latter comes back to Lower Canada in the autumn of 1838 after having escaped to the United States (as a number of Patriotes did indeed), after the first uprising, in that year. As soon as he returns, despite the exhortations of his family, he joins François-Marie-Thomas Chevalier de Lorimier for another attempt. Following a hasty trial, Bouchard, Chevalier de Lorimier and others are sentenced to death.

== Cast ==
- Francis Reddy as François-Xavier Bouchard
- David Boutin as François-Marie-Thomas Chevalier de Lorimier
- Micheline Lanctôt
- Claude Gauthier
- Emmanuel Bilodeau
- Pierre Lebeau
- Suzanne Clément as Angèle Bouchard
- Rosalier Dumontier
- Sylvain Landry
- Philippe Lambert
- Stéphane Simard
- Robert Bouvier
- Roc LaFortune
- Julian Casey
- James Bradford

Comedian Bruno Blanchet shot scenes for the film, but they were cut.

== See also ==
- List of Quebec movies
- Cinema of Quebec
- Culture of Quebec
- Patriote movement
- Quebec nationalism
- Quebec independence movement
- History of Quebec
- Timeline of Quebec history
