= Léo Lévesque =

Léo Lévesque is a French Canadian poet, essayist, and writer born in Montreal, Quebec. He was a finalist for the 1982 Governor General's Award for Literary Merit, and won $10,000 funding in 1997–98 from the Canada Council for the Arts.

He spent 25 years in prison, and has written five collections of prison stories based on his experience, of which Contes en coups de poing was the basis of the 2002 movie Inside (Histoire de pen).
