= Geneviève Néron =

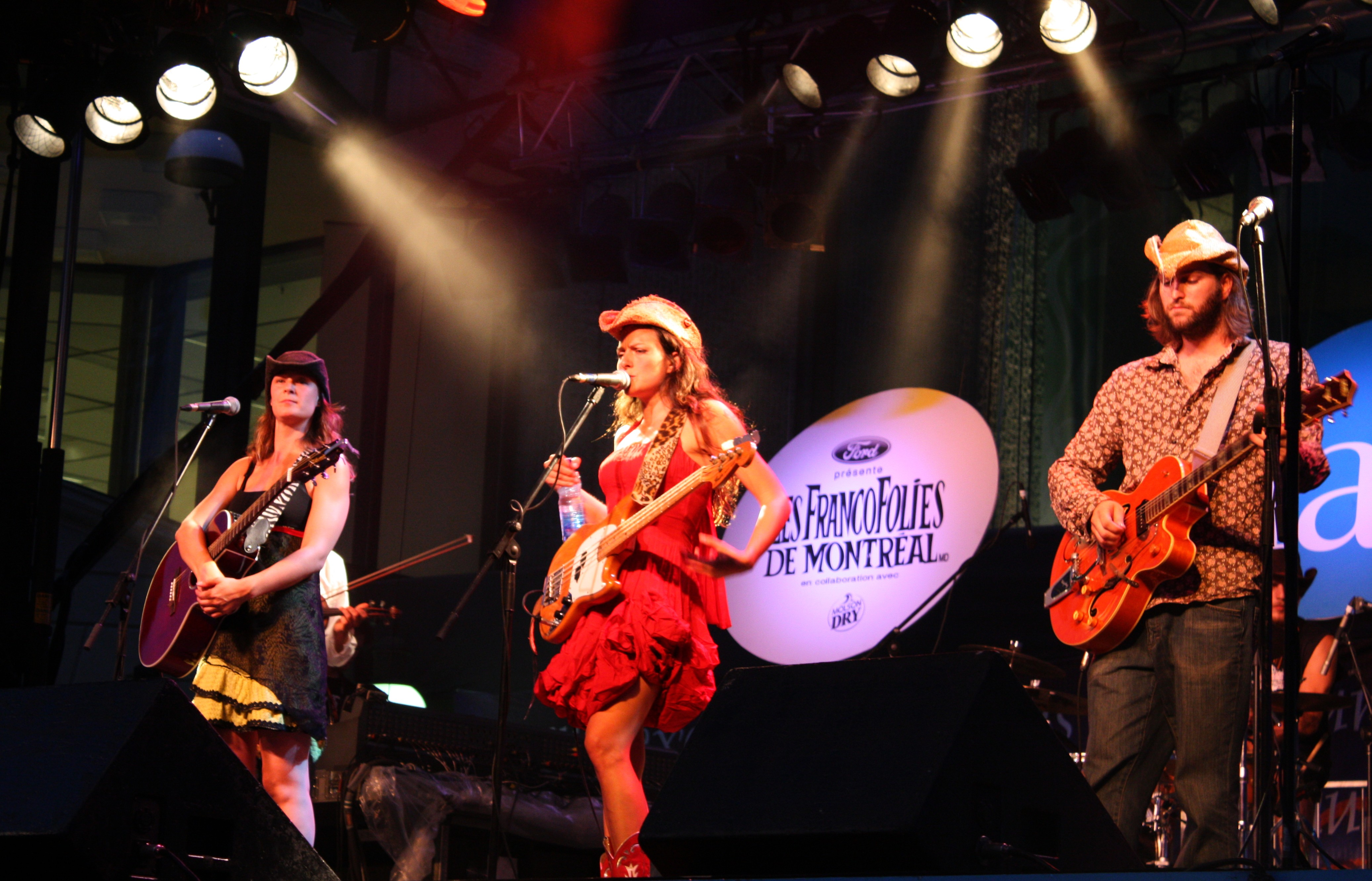
- Geneviève Néron (centre) with Madame Moustache at FrancoFolies de Montréal
- Born: 24 July 1974 (age 51); Montreal, Quebec, Canada
- Occupations: Actress, musician, singer-songwriter
- Television: Virginie; Les Invincibles; Réal-IT and Réal-TV
- Awards: Prix Gémeaux

Geneviève Néron (French pronunciation: [ʒənvjɛv neʁɔ̃]; born 24 July 1974) is a Québécoise actress and musician.

== Biography ==
=== Career ===
After studying film and theatre at Cégep de Saint-Jérôme, Néron acted in low-profile stage plays and began to appear on television. She found a broader audience with appearances in the television series Virginie, Tribu.com and Les Invincibles. She made her breakthrough with programmes for youth, Réal-IT and Réal-TV, receiving a Prix Gémeaux in 2004.

Between television appearances, Néron appeared in several films including Les Boys 3, Soowitch and La Moitié gauche du frigo. She was also in the cast of the mini-series Jean Duceppe.

Since 2005 Néron has been touring with her country-rock group, Madame Moustache, of which she is the lead vocalist and bass guitarist. Their first album, Au nom du countr(i), was released in 2008. She wrote most of the songs for their second album, Génération Passe-Partout, in support of which they toured France.

Néron was part of the environmental project and documentary Vu du large II (transl. Seen From the Sea) which examined the health of the St Lawrence River. From 15 September 2007 she co-hosted with Christophe Rapin the travel-journalism competition series Rallye Müvmedia on Télé-Québec.

Néron was set to star in the film Hank est en ville which looked at two western singers trying to bring Hank Williams to Quebec in the 1950s.

=== Private life ===
Néron has a daughter named Marianne. Her younger sister, Gabrielle, is also an actress. Gabrielle appeared with Néron in Les Invincibles and managed Madame Moustache's first album tour.

== Filmography ==
- Virginie (1996 TV series) – Agathe Sirois
- Karaoke (1999) – Genevieve
- La Moitié gauche du frigo (2000) – Odile
- Soowitch (2001) – Karine
- Les Boys 3 (2001) – Chantal
- Jean Duceppe (2002 TV miniseries) – Louise Duceppe
- Réal-IT (2002 TV series) – Manu
- Rumeurs (2004) – Chloe
- Les Invincibles (2005 TV series) – Kathleen Samson
- Les 7 (2006 musical-comedy) – Jolie Julie
- Et Dieu créa... Laflaque (2006) – Voice of Laurence
- Niagara (2022) - Lucie

== Discography with Madame Moustache ==
- On behalf of the countr(i) (2008)
- Génération Passe-Partout (2009, various artists)
- Maison mobile (2012)

== Tribute ==
A song called "Geneviève Néron" was written and performed by Granby, Quebec-based pop punk rock band Le volume était au maximum, which recorded two versions for their album Filles de l'espace and a single in 2004.
