= Babel (1999 film) =

- Directed by: Gérard Pullicino
- Written by: Vincent Lambert; Gérard Pullicino; Serge Richez
- Produced by: Georges Benayoun
- Starring: Mitchell David Rothpan; Maria de Medeiros; Michel Jonasz; Tchéky Karyo
- Cinematography: Éric Cayla
- Edited by: Laurent Rouan
- Music by: Gérard Pullicino; Ken Worth
- Production companies: Allegro Films; IMA Productions
- Distributed by: AFMD; Motion International
- Release date: April 7, 1999
- Running time: 95 minutes
- Countries: Canada; France
- Language: French

Babel is a fantasy adventure film, directed by Gérard Pullicino and released in 1999.

The film centres on the Babels, a strange race of trolls who once lived alongside human beings but have been secretly living underground since the Tower of Babel; one day, their map to the secret location of the tower is stolen by a dog who takes it to his human master Patrick Carat (Michel Jonasz), forcing the Babels to team up with Patrick's son David (Mitchell David Rothpan) and David's schoolteacher Alice (Maria de Medeiros) to recover the map before the evil Nemrod (Tchéky Karyo) can steal it to control the world.

The cast also includes Bronwen Booth, Sheena Larkin, Garry Robbins, Maxim Roy, Mark Camacho, Nagui Fam, Maggie Castle, Dino Tosques, Frank Fontaine, Hassan Hamdani, Bruno Ledez, Claude Giroux, Christopher Heyerdahl, Al Vandecruys, Daniel Emilfork and Maurice Chevit in supporting roles.

== Awards ==
Éric Cayla received a Jutra Award nomination for Best Cinematography at the 2nd Jutra Awards in 2000.
