= Romain et Juliette =

2000 Canadian film directed by Frédéric Lapierre

- Directed by: Frédéric Lapierre
- Produced by: Erik Daniel
- Starring: Lionel Villeneuve; Hélène Loiselle; Gabriel Gascon; Louise Portal
- Cinematography: Sylvaine Dufaux
- Production company: Les Films du désert blanc
- Release date: October 2000 (FCIAT)
- Running time: 26 minutes
- Country: Canada
- Language: French

Romain et Juliette is a Canadian short drama film, directed by Frédéric Lapierre and released in 2000. The film stars Lionel Villeneuve and Hélène Loiselle as Romain and Juliette, an elderly couple whose 50-year-marriage is tested when Paul (Gabriel Gascon), an old flame of Juliette's, returns into her life.

The cast also includes Louise Portal as Romain and Juliette's adult daughter.

The film was Villeneuve's final performance before his death.

The film premiered at the Abitibi-Témiscamingue International Film Festival in October 2000, and was later screened at the 2001 Toronto International Film Festival. It was a Jutra Award nominee for Best Live Action Short Film at the 3rd Jutra Awards in 2001.
