= Adulthood (web series) =

Canadian comedy-drama web series

Adulthood (French: L'Âge adulte) is a Canadian comedy-drama web series, which premiered in 2017 on Ici TOU.TV. The series focuses on Alex, Tom and Lucille-Maude Noël, three young adult siblings whose lives undergo significant changes that send shock waves through their family dynamics, with each season centring on a personal crisis in one of their lives.

The first season centres on the aftermath of Alex (Mickaël Gouin) coming out as gay and breaking up with his fiancée Amélie (Mylène Mackay) after waking up from a brief coma following a football injury; the second season focuses on the aftermath of the accidental death of his fraternal twin brother Tom's (Guillaume Lambert) husband Bastien (Marc Beaupré); the third season unfolds with their younger sister Lucille-Maude (Sarah-Anne Parent) in a coma following an accident. Throughout the series, an ongoing storyline also focuses on the revelation that the Noëls also have a Black Canadian half sister named Shonda Diallo (Sharon James) whom they never knew, from a relationship their father Léonard (Richard Fréchette) had before marrying their mother.

The first season of the series was directed by François Jaros, while the second and third seasons were directed by Guillaume Lonergan.

== Awards ==
The series won two Olivier Awards for Best Web Series, in 2017 and 2018.

In 2017, the series won the Jury Prize at the Are You Webfest in Belgium. It won two Prix Gémeaux at the 32nd Prix Gémeaux in 2017, for Best Web Series, Fiction and Best Actress in a Web Series (Mackay).

In 2018, the series won the award for Best Dramedy Series at the Vancouver Web Series Festival. It received eight nominations at the Los Angeles Web Series Festival, including for Best Comedy Series, Best Writing, Best Direction and acting nods for Lambert and Geneviève Boivin-Roussy, and a nomination for Best Short Form Series at the International Digital Emmy Awards.

In 2019, the series won an award for Best Digital Short-Form Drama Series at the C21 International Drama Awards.
