= Mon oncle Antoine =

1971 film by Claude Jutra

- Theatrical release poster
- Directed by: Claude Jutra
- Written by: Clément Perron
- Produced by: Marc Beaudet
- Starring: Jacques Gagnon; Jean Duceppe; Olivette Thibault; Lionel Villeneuve; Claude Jutra
- Cinematography: Michel Brault
- Edited by: Claire Boyer; Claude Jutra
- Music by: Jean Cousineau
- Production company: National Film Board of Canada
- Distributed by: National Film Board of Canada
- Release dates: July 1971 (Moscow); 12 November 1971 (Canada)
- Running time: 104 minutes
- Country: Canada
- Language: French
- Box office: $750,000

Mon oncle Antoine (My Uncle Antoine) is a 1971 French-language Canadian drama film directed by Claude Jutra for the National Film Board of Canada.

The film depicts life in the Maurice Duplessis-era Asbestos Region of rural Québec before the Asbestos Strike of 1949. Set at Christmas time, the story is told from the point of view of 15-year-old boy Benoît (Jacques Gagnon) who is coming of age in a mining town. The Asbestos Strike is regarded by Québec historians as a seminal event in the years before the Quiet Revolution (c. 1959–1970).

The film is an examination of the social conditions in Québec's old, agrarian, conservative and cleric-dominated society on the eve of the social and political changes that transformed the province a decade later.

The film was selected as the Canadian entry for the Best Foreign Language Film at the 44th Academy Awards, but was not accepted as a nominee.

== Plot ==
Benoît is a young teenage boy living in rural Quebec. He works at the town general store belonging to his aunt Cécile and his uncle Antoine, who is also the town undertaker. On 24 December, he begins work, setting up the store display much to the delight of the town and flirting with Carmen, the young girl whom his uncle and aunt employ, and treat as an adopted child.

Madame Jos Poulin's eldest son, Marcel, dies that day, and she places a call to the store asking if Antoine can come to take care of the body. For the first time, Benoît is allowed to go with him. After they load the body into a coffin, they prepare to take it home. However, on the way home, Benoît encourages the horse to run as quickly as possible causing the coffin to fall off the sleigh. He tries to get Antoine to help put the coffin back on the sleigh; however, Antoine who has been steadily drinking throughout the day is unable to lift the coffin. He confesses to Benoît that he hates dealing with the dead bodies and that he is miserable in his life, wishing that he had achieved his dream of owning a hotel in the United States as he had wanted. He confesses that, although he treats Benoît and Carmen like his own, he regrets that his wife was unable to give him children.

Angry with Antoine, Benoît manages to get him back in the sleigh and returns home. He runs up the stairs to get help from his aunt and discovers her embracing Fernand, the help, in her nightgown. Realizing what has happened, Fernand takes Benoît out in the sleigh to look for the body. Traumatized by seeing his aunt and Fernand together, Benoît is no help in remembering where the coffin fell off the sleigh. Eventually they make it back to the Poulin household where they find the entire Poulin family, including Jos, the father, who had been away working, around the coffin mourning the loss of Marcel. Jos looks at Benoît and the film ends.

== Cast ==
- Jacques Gagnon as Benoît
- Lyne Champagne as Carmen
- Jean Duceppe as Uncle Antoine
- Olivette Thibault as Aunt Cécile
- Claude Jutra as Fernand, Clerk
- Lionel Villeneuve as Jos Poulin
- Hélène Loiselle as Madame Poulin
- Mario Dubuc as Poulin's son
- Lise Brunelle as Poulin's daughter
- Alain Legendre as Poulin's son
- Robin Marcoux as Poulin's son
- Serge Evers as Poulin's son
- Monique Mercure as Alexandrine
- Georges Alexander as The Big Boss
- Rene Salvatore Catta as The Vicar

== Production ==
Filming was done in Thetford Mines. Sydney Newman viewed the unfinished film in 1970, and told Jutra that he should delay its release so he could do additional filming. The new shooting was done in February 1971, and added $40,000 onto the film's budget. The NFB provided $237,214 (equivalent to $1,863,662 in 2025) to the film's budget.

The film was originally titled Silent Night, with the text being English even in the French-language version. Jutra renamed the film to Mon oncle Antoine to give the "phenomenon of spectator identification".

== Release ==
Mon oncle Antoine was initially scheduled to be released near Christmas 1970, but reshoots delayed its release. It was released in Montreal on 19 November 1971. The film debuted in July 1971 at the 7th Moscow International Film Festival, where Claude Jutra was nominated for the Golden Prize.

== Reception ==
=== Box office ===
It was then released in theatres, grossing $700,000 (equivalent to $4,387,023 in 2025) by 1974. The viewership of the film rose to 2.5 million due to broadcasts by the Canadian Broadcasting Corporation in October 1973 and August 1974, the second-highest in the CBC's history.

=== Critical response ===
A poll of film critics by Séquences in 1980, voted Mon oncle Antoine was the best film made in Quebec. It was selected as the best Canadian film by polls conducted by the Toronto International Film Festival in 1984 and 1993. Mon oncle Antoine has twice been voted the greatest Canadian film in the Sight & Sound poll, conducted once each decade.

On 23 December 2008, Roger Ebert included Mon oncle Antoine on his "Great Movies" list. Mon oncle Antoine has been designated and preserved as a masterwork by the Audio-Visual Preservation Trust of Canada, a charitable non-profit organisation dedicated to promoting the preservation of Canada's audio-visual heritage.

=== Awards and nominations ===
The film was selected as the Canadian entry for the Best Foreign Language Film at the 44th Academy Awards, but was not chosen as a nominee. It was entered into the 7th Moscow International Film Festival.

- Chicago International Film Festival: November 5 to 20, 1971

Gold Hugo for Best Feature Film
Silver Hugo for Best Screenplay, to Clément Perron

- 23rd Canadian Film Awards, Toronto: October 1, 1971

Best Picture, to Marc Beaudet and Claude Jutra
Best Performance by a Lead Actor, to Jean Duceppe
Best Supporting Actress, to Olivette Thibault
Best Achievement in Cinematography, to Michel Brault
Best Achievement in Direction, to Claude Jutra
Best Music Score, to Jean Cousineau
Best Original Screenplay, to Clément Perron
Best Overall Sound, to Roger Lamoureux

- National Society of Film Critics Awards, New York 1972

Richard and Hinda Rosenthal Foundation Award

- Valladolid International Film Festival, 1971

San Gregorio Prize, to Claude Jutra

- HEMISFILM, San Antonio TX:, February 9 to 11, 1976

Best Direction, to Claude Jutra
Best Actress, to Lyne Champagne
Best Performance by a Teen-Ager, to Jacques Gagnon

- Toronto International Film Festival: September 6 to 15, 1984

Best Canadian Film

== See also ==
- List of Christmas films
- List of submissions to the 44th Academy Awards for Best Foreign Language Film
- List of Canadian submissions for the Academy Award for Best Foreign Language Film
- Roman du terroir, rural novels in Quebec literature

== Works cited ==
- Evans, Gary (1991). In the National Interest: A Chronicle of the National Film Board of Canada from 1949 to 1989. University of Toronto Press. ISBN 0802027849.
- Walz, Eugene, ed. (2002). Canada’s Best Features: Critical essays on 15 Canadian films. Brill Publishers. ISBN 978-94-012-0014-1.
