= 2 minutes du peuple =

Radio sketches

2 minutes du peuple is a series of two-minute radio sketches, created in 1990 and recorded by Quebec Canadian comedian François Pérusse.

These approximately 2 minute sketches were initially broadcast in Quebec on the show Yé trop d'bonneheure on CKOI-FM before airing on CHOE-FM, CPIC-FM or Énergie. From 1996 to 2012 they were also regularly broadcast on French-speaking radio stations: in Belgium on Joker FM, in France in particular on Europe 2 and Rire et Chansons and in Switzerland on Couleur 3.

In total, more than 3000 episodes were made between 1990 and 1996. In 2016 François Pérusse announced the end of 2 Minutes of People and instead launched Pérusse Express, a similar concept but more focused on current events. However, after this date episodes of 2 Minutes have been released occasionally, as during the COVID-19 pandemic in 2020. The sketches of 2 Minutes of People - called 'capsules' by their author - are recognisable by the acceleration that Pérusse applies to his voice to interpret the different characters, which gives a lively and comic effect without time outs. The absurd humour of the capsules is mainly based on a huge amount of puns, nonsense, and trick or treating. The vast majority of episodes are almost independent of each other, but have recurrent characters. They feature scenes from everyday life, songs or parodies of television shows such as The X-Files, ER, Columbo, and Ça se discute and films etc.

Over the years, the series attained cult status in Quebec and Europe. It has won several awards (seven Félix, six Olivier, a Juno and several Golden Ribbons), has been adapted into a TV series ("La serie du peuple") and the albums made from it have sold over 2 million copies.

== Subjects discussed ==
The 'capsules' of 2 minutes of people form a succession of independent sketches that deal with various subjects (everyday life, news, animals, telephone canvassers or advertising) but which can also form a mini-series on a specific theme (for example historical figures such as Jacques Cartier, Ludwig van Beethoven, Louis XIV, Thomas Edison or the series on musical instruments) and even parodies of games, radio and TV programmes (especially debates and talk shows or variety shows as well as television series such as the X-Files, ER and Columbo) and finally humorous songs.

The capsules are either in a Quebec version (Quebec French) or in a French version (French from France), with several series being unpublished in Quebec or France.

There are a few recurring characters like Doctor Malcolm, Inspector Bocolon (a parody of Inspector Columbo), Krikett the super cop (capsule "Action Movie" and "Police Investigations"), "the guy who shops by telephone", Jean-Charles, or even duos: Roger and Caroline, Fux Molder and Dana Scully (X Files of the People), the apprentice and the boss, the couple of the "Slangster House" or a couple who is at home or going out on the town.

Other characters make a unique (but noticeable) appearance during capsules, like the Human of the Year 2000 (as imagined from the 1960s).

There are also recurring elements, such as mockery of politicians, businessmen and companies, sportsmen, actors, singers and music groups etc.

== Regional differences ==
The series was originally from Quebec, but in the transmission to Europe, capsules containing several references to Quebec were modified, for example the gags around Quebec personalities (Michael Louvain, Pier Béland, Fernand Gignac and the Montreal Canadians). They were modified with stars of the French entertainment industry - animator Arthur, pianist Richard Clayderman, musical group 2be3, and French singers Francis Lalanne and Patrick Bruel are among the changes. But, given the popularity of Patrick Bruel outside France, the latter is parodied a few times in the original Quebec version.

The characters sounding 'too Quebec' also see their names modified, for example in the capsule "Emotion and reason" the lover is called Gaston Rinflet in Quebec, but Guy Bainville in France.

The TV show parodies are also different:

During the first Quebec capsules, there were not many series parodying Quebec programmes in particular, but many parodies of television genres. Since returning to Quebec in 2002, the news bulletins (newspaper) have been parodied in Les Nouvelles à une cenne, which parodies the Quebec channel LCN. In France, the series Ça se dispute parodies the French debate programme Ça se discute and the series Tout le monde s’en fout parodies Tout le monde en parle. However, the Quebec adaptation of Tout le Monde en parle has not been parodied in Quebec.

When the series was on hiatus in Quebec, between 1996 and 2002, several capsules also went from French from France to Quebec French: for example, capsules parodying detective series with the character of Krikett, which adopted new characters in Quebec.

Both versions also use the same gags when it comes to a pun that works just as well in Quebec French as it does in French from France: for example, on a situation of everyday life, even with the presidents of the United States like Bill Clinton after the Monica Lewinsky affair. Gags about French politicians are present in both versions, but the Quebec version often features meetings between politicians on both sides of the Atlantic.

They are broadcast daily on these radio stations:

- NRJ (Quebec, Canada)
- Couleur 3 (Switzerland)
- Rire et Chansons, previously Europe 2 (France)
