= The Broken Line =

2008 Canadian film directed by Louis Choquette

- French: La ligne brisée
- Directed by: Louis Choquette
- Written by: Michelle Allen
- Produced by: André Dupuy
- Starring: David Boutin; Guillaume Lemay-Thivierge
- Cinematography: Ronald Plante
- Edited by: Claude Palardy
- Music by: FM Le Sieur
- Production company: Pixcom
- Distributed by: Alliance Vivafilm
- Release date: March 7, 2008
- Running time: 101 minutes
- Country: Canada
- Language: French

The Broken Line (French: La ligne brisée) is a Canadian sports drama film, directed by Louis Choquette and released in 2008. The film stars David Boutin and Guillaume Lemay-Thivierge as Sébastien Messier and Danny Demers, lifelong friends and competitive boxers whose relationship and career is tested when they accidentally hit a bicyclist with their car after a night of excess partying.

The cast also includes Fanny Mallette, Jacynthe René, Benoît Gouin, Steve Laplante and Germain Houde.

The film received a Genie Award nomination for Best Sound Editing (Robert LaBrosse, France Lévesque, Guy Francoeur, Lucie Fortier, Lori Paquet) at the 29th Genie Awards, and a Jutra Award nomination for Best Cinematography (Ronald Plante) at the 11th Jutra Awards.
