= Catherine Trudeau =

Canadian actress (born 1975)

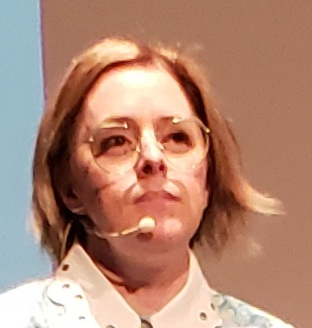
Catherine Trudeau in 2022

Catherine Trudeau (born May 4, 1975) is a Canadian actress. She was born in L'Assomption, Quebec, Canada.

== Filmography ==
- 1995 : 4 et demi... (TV) : Nancy Fugère (2000)
- 2000 : Hochelaga : Louise
- 2001 : Tar Angel (L'Ange de goudron) : Huguette
- 2001 : The Pig's Law (La Loi du cochon) : Bettie Brousseau
- 2002 : Tabou (TV) : Sarah
- 2002 : Séraphin: Heart of Stone (Séraphin: un homme et son péché) : Simone
- 2002 : Réal-TV (série TV) : Patricia (2002)
- 2005 : The Outlander (Le Survenant) : Alphonsine Beauchemin (Phonsine)
- 2005 : Instant Idol (Idole instantanée) : Sophie
- 2005 : Aurore : Sœur Anna
- 2005 : Les Invincibles (TV) : Lyne Boisvert
- 2006 : François en série (TV) : Maude
- 2006 : Family History (Histoire de famille) : Manon
- 2007 : Les Invincibles II (TV) : Lyne Boisvert
- 2009 : Les Invincibles III (TV) : Lyne Boisvert
- 2010: The Child Prodigy (L'Enfant prodige)
- 2015: Snowtime! (La Guerre des tuques 3D) - Jacques
- 2020: Underground (Souterrain)

== Awards and nominations ==
=== Nominations ===
- 2002 : Jutra Award for best actress in L'Ange de goudron
- Nomination for best supporting actress in 2006 for Le Survenant
