= Larry Lynn =

Larry Lynn is a former Canadian cinematographer and filmmaker, most noted as a Genie Award nominee for Best Cinematography at the 23rd Genie Awards in 2003 for his work on the film Inside (Histoire de pen).

His other cinematography credits included the films Hochelaga, See Grace Fly, Amnesia: The James Brighton Enigma, Dear Mr. Gacy and Down River. In 2013, he directed the documentary film Kids in Jail.

He was married to actress Babz Chula. A number of years after her death, he left the film business and was ordained as a Roman Catholic priest.
