= Niagara (2022 film) =

2022 Canadian comedy-drama film

- Directed by: Guillaume Lambert
- Written by: Guillaume Lambert
- Produced by: Laurent Allaire; Tim Ringuette
- Starring: François Pérusse; Guy Jodoin; Éric Bernier
- Cinematography: Marie Davignon
- Edited by: Yvann Thibaudeau
- Music by: Laurence Nerbonne
- Production company: Entract Studios
- Release date: September 11, 2022 (FCVQ)
- Running time: 106 minutes
- Country: Canada
- Language: French

Niagara is a Canadian comedy-drama film, directed by Guillaume Lambert and released in 2022. The film centres on three estranged brothers in their 50s — Victor-Hugo (Guy Jodoin), Alain (François Pérusse) and Léo-Louis (Éric Bernier) Lamothe — who must reunite to undertake a road trip to Niagara Falls after their father Léopold (Marcel Sabourin) unexpectedly dies of a heart attack while trying to participate in an ice bucket challenge.

It was the first film role for Pérusse, who is principally known as a stand-up comedian. The film's cast also includes Véronic DiCaire, Katherine Levac, Muriel Dutil, Élisabeth Chouvalidzé, Marie Eykel, Geneviève Néron, Émi Chicoine, Ariel Charest, Louis Sincennes and Josée Deschênes, as well as Lambert in a small supporting role.

The film premiered at the Quebec City Film Festival on September 8, 2022, before going into commercial release on September 16. It was made available for home viewing on the Club Illico platform on November 3. It also screened in the Borsos Competition at the 2022 Whistler Film Festival, where Lambert won the award for Best Screenplay in a Borsos Competition Film.

== Cast ==
- François Pérusse as Alain Lamothe
- Eric Bernier as Léo-Louis Lamothe
- Guy Jodoin as Victor-Hugo Lamothe
- Guillaume Lambert as Tommy Lamothe
- Muriel Dutil as Céline
- Marcel Sabourin as Léopold Lamothe
- Marie Eykel as Sveta Amaliev
- Geneviève Néron as Lucie
- Katherine Levac as Penelope P.
- Émi Chicoine as Shanie
- Marie-France Marcotte as Danielle
- Ariel Charest as Caissière du service au volant
