= Marriages (2001 film) =

2001 film by Catherine Martin

- French: Mariages
- Directed by: Catherine Martin
- Written by: Catherine Martin
- Produced by: Lorraine Dufour
- Starring: Marie-Ève Bertrand; Guylaine Tremblay; Hélène Loiselle
- Cinematography: Jean-Claude Labrecque
- Edited by: Lorraine Dufour
- Music by: Robert Marcel Lepage
- Production companies: Coop Vidéo de Montréal; Productions 23
- Distributed by: Film Tonic
- Release date: August 27, 2001 (MWFF)
- Running time: 95 minutes
- Country: Canada
- Language: French

Marriages (French: Mariages) is a Canadian drama film, directed by Catherine Martin and released in 2001. The film centres on Yvonne (Marie-Ève Bertrand), a young girl in 19th-century Quebec whose life is turned upside down by both her own sexual awakening and the apparent return of her mother, who died giving birth to her.

The film's cast also includes Guylaine Tremblay, Hélène Loiselle, David Boutin, Mirianne Brûlé and Raymond Cloutier.

== Critical response ==
The film was named to the Toronto International Film Festival's annual Canada's Top Ten list for 2001, and Martin received a Genie Award nomination for Best Screenplay at the 22nd Genie Awards.
