= Hélène Loiselle =

Canadian actress

- Born: March 17, 1928; Montreal, Quebec
- Died: August 7, 2013 (aged 85)
- Occupation: Actress
- Spouse: Lionel Villeneuve
- Relatives: Hubert Loiselle

Hélène Loiselle (March 17, 1928 – August 7, 2013) was a Canadian actress living and working in Quebec.

== Life ==
She was born in Montreal and studied acting with Charlotte Boisjoli, François Rozet, Jean Valcourt and Lucie de Vienne during the 1940s. Loiselle joined the theatre troupe Compagnons de Saint-Laurent and performed works by Jean Giraudoux, Racine, Edmond Rostand and Shakespeare. She spent two years in the early 1950s in Paris developing her technique. On her return, she performed in plays that included Chekhov's Three Sisters and Uncle Vanya, Antigone and Victor ou les Enfants au pouvoir.

In 1995, Loiselle received a Prix Gémeaux for her role in the television drama Sous un ciel variable. She also played several witches in the popular Radio Canada television show for children Fanfreluche.

Loiselle married the actor Lionel Villeneuve; he died in 2000, just a few weeks after the premiere of Romain et Juliette, a short film in which they played an elderly married couple.

In 2006, she received the Prix Denise-Pelletier.

She died at the age of 85 after suffering from Alzheimer's disease for a number of years.

Her brother Hubert Loiselle was also a well-known Quebec actor.

== Selected performances ==
=== Film ===
- Mon oncle Antoine - 1971
- Françoise Durocher, Waitress - 1972
- Hold on to Daddy's Ears (Tiens-toi bien après les oreilles à papa) - 1972
- Orders (Les Ordres) - 1974
- Post Mortem - 1999
- Romain et Juliette - 2000
- The Bottle (La bouteille) - 2000
- Marriages (Mariages) - 2001
- The White Chapel (Une chapelle blanche) - 2005
- Gilles - 2008

=== Theatre ===
- Les Belles-sœurs by Michel Tremblay at Théâtre du Rideau Vert (1968)
- En Pièces Détachées by Michel Tremblay at Théâtre de Quat'Sous (1969)
- À toi, pour toujours, ta Marie-Lou by Michel Tremblay at Théâtre de Quat'Sous (1971)
- A Streetcar Named Desire by Tennessee Williams with the company Compagnie Jean-Duceppe (1974)
- Les Voisins by Claude Meunier and Louis Saia (1980)
- Les Chaises by Eugene Ionesco at Théâtre de Quat'Sous (1991)
- La Leçon d'anatomie by Larry Tremblay at Théâtre de Quat'Sous (1992)
- Yerma by Federico García Lorca at Théâtre du Rideau Vert (1993)
- La Cantatrice chauve by Eugene Ionesco at Théâtre du Rideau Vert (1996)
