= Werner Volkmer =

Werner Volkmer (May 16, 1944 - June 12, 2020) was a German-Canadian documentary filmmaker. He was most noted for his 2000 film Searching for Louis Archambault (À la recherche de Louis Archambault), which was the winner of the Jutra Award for Best Documentary Film at the 3rd Jutra Awards in 2001.

Born in Haan, Germany, in 1944, he studied communications, advertising and design at the Kunsthochschule Kassel in Kassel before emigrating to Canada in 1970, where he was a cofounder of the Aquilon Films studio.

He received a Gemini Award nomination for Best Documentary Program at the 5th Gemini Awards in 1990 for Batiya Bak!, a documentary about Turkish immigrants to Canada.

In addition to its Jutra Award win, Searching for Louis Archambault was also the winner of the award for Best Canadian Film at the 2000 International Festival of Films on Art, and the award for Best Arts Documentary at the 2000 Hot Docs Canadian International Documentary Festival.

Volkmer died in 2000 in Montreal, aged 76.

== Filmography ==
- Power Behind the Wings (Moteur) - 1979
- In Good Company (En bonne compagnie) - 1982
- Cole Palen's Flying Circus - 1987
- Batiya Bak! - 1990
- The Astronomer King (Le Roi astronome) - 1992
- The Bomb Under the World (Le compte à rebours sa poursuite) - 1994
- Mexico: Escaping from History (Mexique: Rompre avec le passé) - 1994
- South Africa: The Tribal Mind (Afrique du sud: L'esprit tribal) - 1994
- Searching for Louis Archambault (À la recherche de Louis Archambault) - 2000
- Roussil, or The Curious Destiny of an Impenitent Anarchist (Roussil, ou Le curieux destin d'un anarchiste impénitent) - 2003
