= Inséparables (2000 film) =

2000 Canadian film directed by Normand Bergeron

- Directed by: Normand Bergeron
- Written by: Normand Bergeron
- Produced by: Normand Bergeron
- Starring: Stéphane Crête; Évelyne Rompré
- Cinematography: Jeremy Peter Allen
- Edited by: Jeremy Peter Allen
- Music by: O.S. Arun; Sylvain Gagnon
- Release date: 2000
- Running time: 10 minutes
- Country: Canada
- Language: French

Inséparables is a Canadian short drama film, directed by Normand Bergeron and released in 2000.

Adapted from Alberto Moravia's short story "Don't Delve Too Deeply (Non approfondire)", the film stars Stéphane Crête as Alexandre, a man who is processing his feelings about his wife having left him, and Évelyne Rompré as a waitress who is serving and listening to him.

The film won the Jutra Award for Best Live Action Short Film at the 3rd Jutra Awards in 2001.
