= Éric Cayla =

Canadian cinemotographer

Éric Cayla is a Canadian cinematographer. He is most noted as a two-time Genie Award nominee for Best Cinematography, receiving nods at the 17th Genie Awards in 1996 for A Cry in the Night (Le Cri de la nuit) and at the 18th Genie Awards in 1997 for Karmina, and a two-time Jutra Award nominee for Best Cinematography, receiving nods at the 2nd Jutra Awards in 2000 for Babel and at the 5th Jutra Awards in 2003 for The Baroness and the Pig.

He has also been a four-time Gemini Award and Canadian Screen Award nominee for Best Photography in a Dramatic Program or Series, receiving nominations at the 18th Gemini Awards in 2003 for Silent Night, at the 1st Canadian Screen Awards in 2013 for Bomb Girls, at the 2nd Canadian Screen Awards in 2014 for Bomb Girls, and dual nominations at the 3rd Canadian Screen Awards in 2015 for Bomb Girls: Facing the Enemy and Haven, and a nominee for Best Photography in a Comedy Program or Series at the 9th Canadian Screen Awards in 2021 for Private Eyes.

He received the Canadian Society of Cinematographers' Kodak New Century lifetime achievement award in 2014.

His other credits have included the films The Night of the Visitor (La nuit du visiteur), The Sex of the Stars (Le Sexe des étoiles), Cap Tourmente, Jerome's Secret (Le Secret de Jérôme), Life After Love (La vie après l'amour), The Bay of Love and Sorrows, White Skin (La peau blanche), Young Triffie, My Aunt Aline (Ma tante Aline), The Corruption of Divine Providence and Single All the Way.
