= Michel Jetté =

Canadian filmmaker

Michel Jetté is a Québécois director, screenwriter, producer and editor. He produced three full-length movies, several short films, and over a hundred television reports. His most recent upcoming release is BumRush on 1 April 2011.

He studied communication and cinema and interned under the filmmaker Jean Lefebvre between 1989 and 1984, during which time he released three short films: L'Ombre de la lumière (1979), Pixil, and Jan de Table (1984). He then produced L'univers d'Audrée (1986) and La Tarentule (1998).

== Awards and nominations ==
- Jetté won the Gémeaux Award for Best Current Affairs Series three times for his subsequent directing of the television series Le Match de la Vie between 1990 and 1994.
- In 2000, he won "Grand Prix des Amériques" for Hochelaga at the Montreal World Film Festival
- In 2001, he was nominated for three Jutra Awards for Hochelaga, namely for Best Direction, Best Editing and Best Screenplay.

== Filmography ==
Movies

- 1994: Le lac de la lune
- 2000: Hochelaga
- 2002: Inside (Histoire de pen)
- 2011: BumRush

Short films

- 1979: L'Ombre de la lumière
- ????: Pixil
- 1984: Jan de Table
- 1986: L'univers d'Audrée
- 1988 La Tarentule
