= Inside (2002 film) =

- A poster with the film's international title: Inside
- French: Histoire de pen
- Directed by: Michel Jetté
- Written by: Michel Jetté; Léo Lévesque
- Produced by: Michel Jetté; Louise Sabourin
- Starring: Emmanuel Auger; Karyne Lemieux; David Boutin
- Cinematography: Larry Lynn
- Edited by: Yvann Thibaudeau
- Music by: Gilles Grégoire
- Production company: Baliverna Films
- Distributed by: Christal Films
- Release date: 2002
- Running time: 112 minutes
- Country: Canada
- Language: French

Inside (French: Histoire de pen, also released in the United Kingdom as Banged Up) is a Québécois film directed by Michel Jetté and released in 2002, about a young man's time in a penitentiary. It is based on Léo Lévesque's collection of prison stories Contes en coup de poing. The film was classified 13+ in Québec and 18+ in the United Kingdom, and features Emmanuel Auger, Karyne Lemieux and David Boutin.

== Plot summary ==
19-year-old Claude begins a 10-year sentence at a penitentiary. Rousseau, a member of Tarzan's gang, attempts to rape him soon after his entry, but Claude is not a novice at fighting and dissuades him from further attempts. Tarzan puts out a contract to assassinate him.

The leader of a rival gang, Zizi Grenier, reveals the contract to Claude and offers his protection if Claude will fight for him. The two gangs hold public boxing events to avoid all-out war, with disputed territories put on the line. Claude accepts, but over the course of these duels learns of the power games playing out in the background.

Claude becomes friends with Lucia (a transvestite) and Jacques (a schizophrenic). He tells them about his love for a girl named Karine and their misadventures which led to his imprisonment, including petty theft, car theft, drug use, an attempted armed robbery gone wrong, and finally involuntary manslaughter during their escape. Lucia is later found dead in her cell.

Claude quits the fights, and befriends a man known as "the Phantom". After Claude is raped with the secret backing of the prison administration, the Phantom helps him escape by illicitly getting him into the prison workshop, and hiding him in a locker shipped out of the prison.

Claude rejoins Karine in her drug business, but on a delivery comes across one of the gang members who aided in his rape, arranges a meeting, and murders him. He is arrested and returned to the penitentiary, to learn of Jacques' suicide. Soon after he is subdued when he learns that he has AIDS, and at the Phantom's request is transferred to a minimum-security prison. The movie ends with a letter from the Phantom to Karine informing her of his transfer.

== Cast ==
- Emmanuel Auger as Claude
- Karyne Lemieux as Karine
- David Boutin as Jacques le Schizo
- Paul Dion as L'Fantôme
- Dominic Darceuil as Lucia
- Sylvain Beauchamps as Tarzan
- Louis-David Morasse as Rousseau
- Jean-Robert Bourdage as Voix du trou (voice)
- Gabriel Bélanger as La Comete Blonde
- Deano Clavet as Piston
- Christopher Dyson as Claude (voice)
- Stéphane Ouellet as Boxeur
- Jean-Sébastien Poirier as Zizi Grenier
- Michèle Péloquin as Agente Correctionnel - CO

== Reception ==
Inside has received mixed reviews from critics and audiences.

Scott Foundas of Variety on 16 October 2002 stated a "by-the-numbers prison drama", with a "litany of prison-movie cliches" and it "won’t travel far outside its native borders". efilmcritic.com said a "gritty, uncompromising prison drama", "it's hard to watch, but it rings so true that it can't be dismissed" and "not a feel-good picture, but it is extremely well made". Charles-Henri Ramond from filmsquebec.com stated it was a "dark and violent social drama".

== Accolades ==
It won an award at the Nickel Independent Film Festival in St. John's, Newfoundland.

The film received four Genie Award nominations at the 23rd Genie Awards in 2003, for Best Supporting Actor (Darceuil), Best Cinematography (Larry Lynn), Best Overall Sound (Gavin Fernandes, Bobby O'Malley and Philippe Pelletier) and Best Sound Editing (Louis Collin, Natalie Fleurant and Denis Saindon).
