= Life After Love (film) =

- French: La vie après l'amour
- Directed by: Gabriel Pelletier
- Written by: Ken Scott
- Produced by: Roger Frappier; Luc Vandal
- Starring: Michel Côté; Sylvie Léonard; Patrick Huard; Guylaine Tremblay
- Cinematography: Éric Cayla
- Edited by: Alain Baril
- Music by: Benoît Charest
- Production company: Max Films
- Distributed by: Alliance Atlantis Vivafilm
- Release date: July 7, 2000
- Running time: 104 minutes
- Country: Canada
- Language: French

Life After Love (French: La vie après l'amour) is a 2000 Canadian romantic comedy film, directed by Gabriel Pelletier. The film stars Michel Côté as Gilles, a man who is desperately trying to win back the love of his ex-wife Sophie (Sylvie Léonard) after she leaves him for another man.

The film received two Genie Award nominations at the 21st Genie Awards, for Best Supporting Actor (Patrick Huard) and Best Costume Design (Denis Sperdouklis). It received five Prix Jutra nominations at the 3rd Jutra Awards, for Best Film, Best Actor (Côté), Best Supporting Actor (Huard), Best Supporting Actress (Guylaine Tremblay) and Best Screenplay (Ken Scott), as well as winning the Billet d'or as the year's top-grossing Quebec film.

== Release ==
Alliance Atlantis Vivafilm released Life After Love in North America on DVD and video-on-demand on February 26, 2002.
