= Suddenly Naked =

2001 film by Anne Wheeler

- Directed by: Anne Wheeler
- Written by: Elyse Friedman
- Produced by: Gavin Wilding
- Starring: Wendy Crewson; Peter Coyote
- Cinematography: David Frazee
- Edited by: Lara Mazur
- Music by: Chris Ainscough
- Production company: Creative Differences
- Distributed by: Remstar Distribution
- Release date: 8 September 2001 (Canada)
- Running time: 105 mn.
- Country: Canada
- Language: English

Suddenly Naked is a 2001 drama film directed by Anne Wheeler, written by Elyse Friedman, and starring Wendy Crewson and Peter Coyote.

== Plot ==
Jackie York (Wendy Crewson) is a famous novelist with a secret: she is suffering from writer’s block and is unable to write her much-anticipated novel. After being used and then dumped by a wannabe movie director, Jackie can't get back to work. So Jackie concocts a mess of lies to cover up her loneliness and to protect her secret. Jackie then meets a man named Patrick McKeating (Joe Cobden), a writer who opens her up to new possibilities. However, Patrick is nearly 20 years younger than Jackie. Jackie gets a lesson in true love and must decide what really matters in life.

== Cast ==
- Wendy Crewson as Jackie York
- Peter Coyote as Lionel
- Emmanuelle Vaugier as Lupe Martinez
- Joe Cobden as Patrick McKeating
- Jud Tylor as Crystal
- Jennifer Carmichael as "Rainbow"
- Eliza Murbach as Kelly
- Dan Joffre as Fan
- Camille Mitchell as Sasha
- Michael Shanks as Danny Blair
- Ron Selmour as Security Guard

== Awards and nominations ==
- 2002 Anne Wheeler and Gavin Wilding won Best Feature Length Drama at the Leo Awards
- 2002 Lara Mazur won Best Picture Editing in a Feature Length Drama at the Leo Awards
- 2002 Anne Wheeler won Feature Length Drama: Best Director at the Leo Awards
- 2002 Chris Ainscough won Feature Length Drama: Best Musical Score at the Leo Awards
- 2003 Lara Mazur won Best Achievement in Editing at the Genie Awards
- 2003 Gavin Wilding was nominated for "Best Motion Picture" at the Genie Awards
- 2003 Anne Wheeler was nominated for "Best Achievement in Directing" at the Genie Awards
- 2003 Chris Ainscough was nominated for "Best Achievement in Music – Original Score" at the Genie Awards
- 2003 Laura Doyle was nominated for "Best Achievement in Music – Original Song" for the song "Your Love" at the Genie Awards
