= Zéro musique =

- Founded: 1993
- Founder: François Pérusse; Luc de Larochellière; Pierre Dumont; Marc Perusse
- Distributor(s): MCA Records Canada (1993-1997); Universal Music Canada (1997-present)
- Genre: Rock, Pop, Comedy
- Location: Montreal, Quebec, Canada
- Official website: zeromusic.com

Zéro Musique (or Zero Music in English) is a Canadian record label founded in 1993, by four equal partners: musician Luc De Larochellière; two brothers, comedic musician François Pérusse, and audio producer Marc Pérusse; and their manager Pierre Dumont. Headquartered in Montreal, Quebec, Zéro Musique was formed following Luc De Larochellière and François Pérusse's split from Les Disques Trafic when the major record label was having financial and corporate instability (Trafic eventually shut down later in 1993). Instead of looking for a new record label, they opted to start their own independent imprint and immediately secured a financing and distribution deal through MCA Records Canada. Zéro Musique was legally filled as a subsidiary of Pierre Dumont's music publishing company, Del Monte Musique Inc., and became associated with Marc Pérusse's recording studio, Studio Le Divan Vert.

In September 1995, the partners formed the sub-label Sub-Zero Records, intended to release Anglophone bands, the first of which was Likwid. Also in 1995, Zéro Musique started signing other Francophone artists through its main company, including Annette Campagne (whom François Pérusse was dating) and Martine Mai. Albums were also planned for TSPC (in 1998 with an album that was never finished) and Coral Egan (in 1999 which yielded an album produced by Marc Pérusse that never released). In mid-1997, MCA Records Canada was renamed Universal Music Canada and Zéro Musique signed a new partnership contract. To this day, Zéro Musique continues to distribute its releases through Universal Music Canada. Luc De Larochellière and Marc Pérusse left the partnership in 1999 and the record label was restructured in 2000; all of the bands were dropped and the company exclusively released François Pérusse's music from 2000 to 2012. Because of this, people often perceive Zéro Musique as François Pérusse's personal record label, not knowing the first seven years of the company's history.

In the summer of 2012 Zéro Musique expanded to managing other comedian artists and signed Alexandre Barrette (2012–present), Pierre-Luc Gosselin and Nicholas Savard-L'Herbier (as Les Satiriques) (2012–2018), Korine Côté (2012–present), Etienne Dano (2012), Simon Delisle (2012–2015), François Boulianne (2013–2015), Marie-Lyne Joncas (2015), Joe Guérin (2015–2017), Philippe-Audrey Larrue-St-Jacques (2015–present) and Alexandre Bouchard (2015–2017).

== Signed artists ==
- François Pérusse (1993–present)
- Luc De Larochellière (1993–1999)
- Likwid (1995–1998)
- Annette Campagne (1996–1999)
- Martine Mai (1998–1999)
- TSPC (1998–1999)
- Coral Egan (1999)
- Alexandre Barrette (2012–present)
- Pierre-Luc Gosselin and Nicholas Savard-L'Herbier (as Les Satiriques) (2012–2018)
- Korine Côté (2012–present)
- Etienne Dano (2012)
- Simon Delisle (2012–2015)
- François Boulianne (2013–2015)
- Marie-Lyne Joncas (2015)
- Joe Guérin (2015–2017)
- Philippe-Audrey Larrue-St-Jacques (2015–2019)
- Alexandre Bouchard (2015–2017)

== See also ==
- List of Quebec record labels
- List of Quebec musicians
- Music of Quebec
- Culture of Quebec
