= April 4 =

April 4 this year in various calendars
- Saturday, 4 April 2026
Akan	Monomemene
Armenian	18 Ahekani 1475
Aztec	Tlaxochimaco 4, 7 Malīnalli
Babylonian	15 Adaru, 2336 SE
Balinese pawukon	Menga, Kajeng, Menala, Umanis, Maulu, Saniscara of Watugunung, Uma, Dadi, Sri
Bengali	21 Chaitro, BS 1432
Chinese	Yang Earth Monkey・Root Mansion; Fire Horse Year, Month 2, Day 17 (Chunfen, 1 day until Qingming)
Common Era	4 April 2026 CE
Coptic	26 Paremhat, AM 1742
Egyptian	23 Mesori, 2774 NE
Ethiopian	26 Magābit, 2018 Amätä Məhrät
French Republican	Décade II, Quintidi de Germinal de l'Année 234 de la République
Gregorian	4 April, AD 2026
Hebrew	17 Nisan, AM 5786; Omer 2
Hindu	Svātī・Harṣaṇa; Solar: 22 Caitra, 1947 SE; Lunisolar: Dvitīyā, Kṛishna pakṣa of Caitra, 2083 VE; Rāudra・5126 KY・1,872,669
Icelandic	Laugardagur, 12 Einmánuður 2025
Islamic	16 Shawwal, AH 1447 (using tabular method)
ISO week date	2026-W14-6
Japanese	17 Kisaragi, Reiwa 8 (Shunbun, 1 day until Seimei)
Julian	22 March, AD 2026 (AM 7534)
Julian day	2461135
Korean	17 Tokkidal, 4359 DE
Maya	13.0.13.8.12; 5 Pop, 7 Eb
Roman	ante diem XI Kalendas Apriles, MMDCCLXXIX AUC
Solar Hijri	15 Farvardin, SH 1405
Tibetan	17 lhag dbo, me pho rta 2153 or 1772 or 1000

<<	April					>>
Su	Mo	Tu	We	Th	Fr	Sa
			1	2	3	4
5	6	7	8	9	10	11
12	13	14	15	16	17	18
19	20	21	22	23	24	25
26	27	28	29	30
2026

April 4 in recent years
2026 (Saturday)
2025 (Friday)
2024 (Thursday)
2023 (Tuesday)
2022 (Monday)
2021 (Sunday)
2020 (Saturday)
2019 (Thursday)
2018 (Wednesday)
2017 (Tuesday)

April 4 is the 94th day of the year (95th in leap years) in the Gregorian calendar; 271 days remain until the end of the year.

== Events ==
=== Pre-1600 ===
- 503 BC – Roman consul Agrippa Menenius Lanatus celebrates a triumph for a military victory over the Sabines.
- 190 – Dong Zhuo has his troops evacuate the capital Luoyang and burn it to the ground.
- 611 – Maya king Uneh Chan of Calakmul sacks rival city-state Palenque in southern Mexico.
- 619 – The Bijapur-Mumbai inscription is issued by Pulakeshin II, describing the Battle of Narmada.
- 801 – King Louis the Pious captures Barcelona from the Moors after a siege of several months.
- 1268 – A five-year Byzantine–Venetian peace treaty is concluded between Venetian envoys and Emperor Michael VIII Palaiologos.
- 1423 – Death of the Venetian Doge Tommaso Mocenigo, under whose rule victories were achieved against the Kingdom of Hungary and against the Ottoman Empire at the Battle of Gallipoli (1416).
- 1581 – Francis Drake is knighted by Queen Elizabeth I for completing a circumnavigation of the world.

=== 1601–1900 ===
- 1609 – Moriscos are expelled from the Kingdom of Valencia.
- 1660 – Declaration of Breda by King Charles II of Great Britain promises, among other things, a general pardon to all royalists and opponents of the monarchy for crimes committed during the English Civil War and the Interregnum.
- 1796 – Georges Cuvier delivers the first paleontological lecture.
- 1814 – Napoleon abdicates (conditionally) for the first time and names his son Napoleon II as Emperor of the French, followed by unconditional abdication two days later.
- 1818 – The United States Congress, affirming the Second Continental Congress, adopts the flag of the United States with 13 red and white stripes and one star for each state (20 at that time).
- 1841 – William Henry Harrison dies of pneumonia, becoming the first President of the United States to die in office, and setting the record for the briefest administration. Vice President John Tyler succeeds Harrison as President.
- 1860 – The declaration on the introduction of the Finnish markka as an official currency is read in different parts of the Grand Duchy of Finland.
- 1865 – American Civil War: A day after Union forces capture Richmond, Virginia, U.S. President Abraham Lincoln visits the Confederate capital.
- 1866 – Alexander II of Russia narrowly escapes an assassination attempt by Dmitry Karakozov in the city of Saint Petersburg.
- 1887 – Argonia, Kansas elects Susanna M. Salter as the first female mayor in the United States.
- 1894 – Foyot bombing by the Russian or French state during the Ère des attentats.

=== 1901–present ===
- 1904 – Two M_{s} ~7.1 earthquakes, among the largest in Europe, strike Bulgaria, killing over 200 people and causing destruction.
- 1905 – In India, an earthquake hits the Kangra Valley, killing 20,000, and destroying most buildings in Kangra, McLeod Ganj and Dharamshala.
- 1913 – First Balkan War: Greek aviator Emmanouil Argyropoulos becomes the first pilot to die in the Hellenic Air Force when his plane crashes.
- 1920 – The four-day Nebi Musa riots commence.
- 1925 – The Schutzstaffel (SS) is founded under Adolf Hitler's Nazi Party in Germany.
- 1933 – U.S. Navy airship USS Akron is wrecked off the New Jersey coast due to severe weather.
- 1944 – World War II: First bombardment of oil refineries in Bucharest by Anglo-American forces kills 3,000 civilians.
- 1945 – World War II: United States Army troops liberate Ohrdruf forced labor camp in Germany.
- 1945 – World War II: United States Army troops capture Kassel.
- 1945 – World War II: Soviet Red Army troops liberate Hungary from German occupation.
- 1946 – Greek judge and archeologist Panagiotis Poulitsas is appointed Prime Minister of Greece in the midst of the Greek Civil War.
- 1949 – Cold War: Twelve nations sign the North Atlantic Treaty creating the North Atlantic Treaty Organization.
- 1958 – The CND peace symbol is displayed in public for the first time in London.
- 1960 – France agrees to grant independence to the Mali Federation, a union of Senegal and French Sudan.
- 1963 – Bye Bye Birdie, a musical romantic comedy film directed by George Sidney, was released.
- 1964 – The Beatles occupy the top five positions on the Billboard Hot 100 pop chart.
- 1967 – Martin Luther King Jr. delivers his "Beyond Vietnam: A Time to Break Silence" speech in New York City's Riverside Church.
- 1968 – Martin Luther King Jr. is assassinated by James Earl Ray at a motel in Memphis, Tennessee.
- 1968 – Apollo program: NASA launches Apollo 6.
- 1969 – Dr. Denton Cooley implants the first temporary artificial heart.
- 1973 – The Twin Towers of the World Trade Center in New York City are officially dedicated.
- 1973 – A Lockheed C-141 Starlifter, dubbed the Hanoi Taxi, makes the last flight of Operation Homecoming.
- 1975 – Microsoft is founded as a partnership between Bill Gates and Paul Allen in Albuquerque, New Mexico.
- 1975 – Vietnam War: A United States Air Force Lockheed C-5A Galaxy transporting orphans, crashes near Saigon, South Vietnam shortly after takeoff, killing 172 people.
- 1977 – Southern Airways Flight 242 crashes in New Hope, Paulding County, Georgia, killing 72.
- 1979 – Prime Minister Zulfikar Ali Bhutto of Pakistan is executed.
- 1981 – Iran–Iraq War: The Islamic Republic of Iran Air Force mounts an attack on H-3 Airbase and destroys about 50 Iraqi aircraft.
- 1983 – Space Shuttle program: Space Shuttle Challenger makes its maiden voyage into space on STS-6.
- 1984 – President Ronald Reagan calls for an international ban on chemical weapons.
- 1987 – Garuda Indonesia Flight 032 crashes at Medan Airport, killing 23.
- 1988 – Governor Evan Mecham of Arizona is convicted in his impeachment trial and removed from office.
- 1990 – The current flag of Hong Kong is adopted for post-colonial Hong Kong during the Third Session of the Seventh National People's Congress.
- 1991 – Senator John Heinz of Pennsylvania and six others are killed when a helicopter collides with their airplane over an elementary school in Merion, Pennsylvania.
- 1991 – Forty-one people are taken hostage inside a Good Guys! Electronics store in Sacramento, California. Three of the hostage takers and three hostages are killed.
- 1994 – Three people are killed when KLM Cityhopper Flight 433 crashes at Amsterdam Airport Schiphol.
- 1996 – Comet Hyakutake is imaged by the USA Asteroid Orbiter Near Earth Asteroid Rendezvous.
- 1997 – Space Shuttle program: Space Shuttle Columbia is launched on STS-83. However, the mission is later cut short due to a fuel cell problem.
- 2002 – The MPLA government of Angola and UNITA rebels sign a peace treaty ending the Angolan Civil War.
- 2009 – France announces its return to full participation of its military forces within NATO.
- 2010 – A magnitude 7.2 earthquake hits south of the Mexico-USA border, killing at least two and damaging buildings across the two countries.
- 2011 – Georgian Airways Flight 834 crashes at N'djili Airport in Kinshasa, killing 32.
- 2013 – Seventy-four people are killed in a building collapse in Thane, India.
- 2017 – Syria conducts an air strike on Khan Shaykhun using chemical weapons, killing 89 civilians.
- 2020 – China holds a national day of mourning for martyrs who died in the fight against the novel coronavirus disease outbreak.
- 2023 – Finland becomes a member of NATO after Turkey accepts its membership request.
- 2024 – Russo-Ukrainian war: The Battle of Chasiv Yar begins.
- 2025 – The impeachment of President Yoon Suk Yeol of South Korea in response to his declaration of martial law is unanimously upheld by the country's Constitutional Court, ending his presidency.

== Births ==
=== Pre-1600 ===
- 188 – Caracalla, Roman emperor (died 217)
- 1436 – Amalia of Saxony, Duchess of Bavaria-Landshut (died 1501)
- 1490 – Vojtěch I of Pernstein, Bohemian nobleman (died 1534)
- 1492 – Ambrosius Blarer, German-Swiss theologian and reformer (died 1564)
- 1572 – William Strachey, English author (died 1621)
- 1586 – Richard Saltonstall, English diplomat (died 1661)
- 1593 – Edward Nicholas, English soldier and politician, Secretary of State for the Southern Department (died 1669)

=== 1601–1900 ===
- 1640 – Gaspar Sanz, Spanish guitarist, composer, and priest (died 1710)
- 1646 – Antoine Galland, French orientalist and archaeologist (died 1715)
- 1648 – Grinling Gibbons, Dutch-English sculptor (died 1721)
- 1676 – Giuseppe Maria Orlandini, Italian composer (died 1760)
- 1688 – Joseph-Nicolas Delisle, French astronomer and cartographer (died 1768)
- 1718 – Benjamin Kennicott, English theologian and scholar (died 1783)
- 1752 – Niccolò Antonio Zingarelli, Italian composer (died 1837)
- 1760 – Juan Manuel Olivares, Venezuelan organist and composer (died 1797)
- 1762 – Stephen Storace, English actor and composer (died 1796)
- 1772 – Nachman of Breslov, Ukrainian founder of the Breslov Hasidic movement (died 1810)
- 1780 – Edward Hicks, American minister and painter (died 1849)
- 1785 – Bettina von Arnim, German author, illustrator, and composer (died 1859)
- 1792 – Thaddeus Stevens, American lawyer and politician (died 1868)
- 1802 – Dorothea Dix, American nurse and activist (died 1887)
- 1818 – Thomas Mayne Reid, Irish-American author and poet (died 1883)
- 1819 – Maria II of Portugal (died 1853)
- 1821 – Linus Yale Jr., American engineer and businessman (died 1868)
- 1826 – Zénobe Gramme, Belgian engineer, invented the Gramme machine (died 1901)
- 1829 – Owen Suffolk, Australian bushranger, poet, confidence-man and author (died ?)
- 1835 – John Hughlings Jackson, English physician and neurologist (died 1911)
- 1842 – Édouard Lucas, French mathematician and theorist (died 1891)
- 1843 – William Henry Jackson, American painter and photographer (died 1942)
- 1846 – Comte de Lautréamont, Uruguayan-French poet and educator (died 1870)
- 1851 – James Campbell, 1st Baron Glenavy, Irish lawyer and politician (died 1931)
- 1853 – Remy de Gourmont, French poet, novelist, and critic (died 1915)
- 1868 – Philippa Fawcett, English mathematician and educator (died 1948)
- 1869 – Mary Colter, American architect, designed the Desert View Watchtower (died 1958)
- 1875 – Pierre Monteux, Sephardic Jewish French-American viola player and conductor (died 1964)
- 1876 – Maurice de Vlaminck, French painter and poet (died 1958)
- 1878 – Walter Conrad Arensberg, American art collector, critic and poet (died 1954)
- 1878 – Stylianos Lykoudis, Greek admiral and historian (died 1958)
- 1879 – Gustav Goßler, German rower (died 1940)
- 1884 – James Alberione, Italian priest, founded the Society of St. Paul (died 1971)
- 1884 – Isoroku Yamamoto, Japanese admiral (died 1943)
- 1886 – Frank Luther Mott, American historian and journalist (died 1964)
- 1888 – Tris Speaker, American baseball player and manager (died 1958)
- 1888 – Zdzisław Żygulski, Sr., Polish historian and academic (died 1975)
- 1889 – Makhanlal Chaturvedi, Indian journalist, poet, and playwright (died 1968)
- 1892 – Italo Mus, Italian painter (died 1967)
- 1892 – Edith Södergran, Swedish-Finnish poet (died 1923)
- 1895 – Arthur Murray, American dancer and educator (died 1991)
- 1896 – Robert E. Sherwood, American playwright and screenwriter (died 1955)
- 1897 – Pierre Fresnay, French actor and screenwriter (died 1975)
- 1898 – Agnes Ayres, American actress (died 1940)
- 1899 – Hillel Oppenheimer, German-Israeli botanist and academic (died 1971)

=== 1901–present ===
- 1902 – Louise Lévêque de Vilmorin, French journalist and author (died 1969)
- 1902 – Stanley G. Weinbaum, American author and poet (died 1935)
- 1905 – Eugène Bozza, French composer and conductor (died 1991)
- 1905 – Erika Nõva, Estonian architect and engineer (died 1987)
- 1906 – Bea Benaderet, Turkish-Irish-American television, radio, and voice actress (died 1968)
- 1906 – John Cameron Swayze, American journalist (died 1995)
- 1907 – Robert Askin, Australian sergeant and politician, 32nd Premier of New South Wales (died 1981)
- 1910 – Đặng Văn Ngữ, Vietnamese physician and academic (died 1967)
- 1913 – Dave Brown, Australian rugby league player (died 1974)
- 1913 – Rosemary Lane, American actress and singer (died 1974)
- 1913 – Frances Langford, American actress and singer (died 2005)
- 1913 – Jules Léger, Canadian lawyer and politician, 21st Governor General of Canada (died 1980)
- 1913 – Muddy Waters, American singer-songwriter and guitarist (died 1983)
- 1914 – Richard Coogan, American actor (died 2014)
- 1914 – Marguerite Duras, French novelist, screenwriter, and director (died 1996)
- 1914 – David W. Goodall, Australian ecologist and botanist (died 2018)
- 1915 – Louis Archambault, Canadian sculptor (died 2003)
- 1916 – Nikola Ljubičić, Serbian general and politician, 10th President of Serbia (died 2005)
- 1916 – Mickey Owen, American baseball player and coach (died 2005)
- 1916 – David White, American actor (died 1990)
- 1918 – George Jellicoe, 2nd Earl Jellicoe, English soldier and politician, Leader of the House of Lords (died 2007)
- 1920 – Ignatius IV of Antioch, Greek patriarch (died 2012)
- 1921 – Orunamamu, American-Canadian author and educator (died 2014)
- 1921 – Elizabeth Wilson, American actress (died 2015)
- 1922 – Elmer Bernstein, American composer and conductor (died 2004)
- 1923 – Peter Vaughan, English actor (died 2016)
- 1923 – Gene Reynolds, American actor, director, producer and screenwriter (died 2020)
- 1924 – Bob Christie, American race car driver (died 2009)
- 1924 – Gil Hodges, American baseball player and manager (died 1972)
- 1925 – Dettmar Cramer, German footballer and manager (died 2015)
- 1925 – Frank Truitt, American basketball player and coach (died 2014)
- 1925 – Claude Wagner, Canadian lawyer, judge, and politician (died 1979)
- 1925 – Emmett Williams, American poet and author (died 2007)
- 1926 – Ronnie Masterson, Irish actress (died 2014)
- 1927 – Joe Orlando, Italian-American author and illustrator (died 1998)
- 1928 – Maya Angelou, American memoirist and poet (died 2014)
- 1928 – Jimmy Logan, Scottish actor, director, and producer (died 2001)
- 1928 – Monty Norman, English singer-songwriter and producer (died 2022)
- 1929 – Humbert Allen Astredo, American actor (died 2016)
- 1930 – Netty Herawaty, Indonesian actress (died 1989)
- 1931 – James Dickens, English politician (died 2013)
- 1931 – Bobby Ray Inman, American admiral and intelligence officer
- 1931 – Catherine Tizard, New Zealand politician, 16th Governor-General of New Zealand (died 2021)
- 1932 – Clive Davis, American record producer, founded Arista Records and J Records (died 2026)
- 1932 – Richard Lugar, American lieutenant and politician, 44th Mayor of Indianapolis (died 2019)
- 1932 – Anthony Perkins, American actor (died 1992)
- 1932 – Johanna Reiss, Dutch-American author
- 1932 – Andrei Tarkovsky, Russian director and producer (died 1986)
- 1933 – Bill France Jr., American businessman (died 2007)
- 1933 – Brian Hewson, English runner (died 2022)
- 1933 – Bapu Nadkarni, Indian cricketer (died 2020)
- 1934 – Helen Hanft, American actress (died 2013)
- 1934 – Kronid Lyubarsky, Russian journalist and activist (died 1996)
- 1935 – Geoff Braybrooke, English-New Zealand soldier and politician (died 2013)
- 1935 – Kenneth Mars, American actor and comedian (died 2011)
- 1935 – Trevor Griffiths, English playwright and educator (died 2024)
- 1938 – A. Bartlett Giamatti, American businessman and academic (died 1989)
- 1939 – JoAnne Carner, American golfer
- 1939 – Darlene Hooley, American educator and politician
- 1939 – Hugh Masekela, South African trumpeter, flugelhornist, cornetist, composer, and singer (died 2018)
- 1940 – Richard Attwood, English race car driver
- 1940 – Sharon Sheeley, American singer-songwriter (died 2002)
- 1941 – Zia Uddin, Bangladeshi Islamic scholar and politician
- 1942 – Jim Fregosi, American baseball player and manager (died 2014)
- 1942 – Kitty Kelley, American journalist and biographer
- 1942 – Elizabeth Levy, American author
- 1943 – Paulette Jiles, American writer (died 2025)
- 1944 – Magda Aelvoet, Belgian politician
- 1944 – Mary Kenny, Irish journalist, author, and playwright
- 1944 – Bob McDill, American country music songwriter
- 1944 – Craig T. Nelson, American actor, director, producer, and screenwriter
- 1944 – Nelson Prudêncio, Brazilian triple jumper and educator (died 2012)
- 1944 – Toktamış Ateş, Turkish academician, political commentator, columnist and writer (died 2013)
- 1945 – Daniel Cohn-Bendit, French-German educator and politician
- 1945 – Caroline McWilliams, American actress (died 2010)
- 1946 – Colin Coates, Australian speed skater
- 1946 – Dave Hill, English guitarist
- 1946 – Katsuaki Satō, Japanese martial artist and coach
- 1946 – György Spiró, Hungarian author and playwright
- 1946 – Bubba Wyche, American football player and coach
- 1947 – Wiranto, Indonesian general and politician
- 1947 – Ray Fosse, American baseball player and sportscaster (died 2021)
- 1947 – Eliseo Soriano, Filipino minister and television host (died 2021)
- 1948 – Abdullah Öcalan, Turkish activist
- 1948 – Berry Oakley, American bass player (died 1972)
- 1948 – Richard Parsons, American lawyer and businessman (died 2024)
- 1948 – Dan Simmons, American author (died 2026)
- 1948 – Derek Thompson, Northern Irish actor
- 1948 – Pick Withers, English drummer
- 1949 – Junior Braithwaite, Jamaican-American singer (died 1999)
- 1949 – Litsa Diamanti, Greek singer
- 1949 – Shing-Tung Yau, Chinese-American mathematician and academic
- 1950 – Christine Lahti, American actress and director
- 1951 – John Hannah, American football player and coach
- 1952 – Rosemarie Ackermann, German high jumper
- 1952 – Pat Burns, Canadian ice hockey player and coach (died 2010)
- 1952 – Gregg Hansford, Australian race car driver and motorcycle racer (died 1995)
- 1952 – Cherie Lunghi, English actress and dancer
- 1952 – Karen Magnussen, Canadian figure skater and coach
- 1952 – Gary Moore, Northern Irish singer-songwriter, guitarist, and producer (died 2011)
- 1952 – Villy Søvndal, Danish educator and politician, Danish Minister of Foreign Affairs
- 1953 – Robert Bertrand, Canadian politician (died 2022)
- 1953 – Henry Fotheringham, South African cricketer
- 1953 – Simcha Jacobovici, Canadian director, producer, journalist, and author
- 1953 – Sammy Wilson, Northern Irish politician, 31st Lord Mayor of Belfast
- 1953 – Chen Yi, Chinese violinist and composer
- 1956 – Evelyn Hart, Canadian ballerina
- 1956 – Tom Herr, American baseball player and manager
- 1956 – David E. Kelley, American screenwriter and producer
- 1957 – Paul Downton, English cricketer
- 1957 – Aki Kaurismäki, Finnish director, producer, and screenwriter
- 1957 – Graeme Kelling, Scottish guitarist (died 2004)
- 1957 – Nobuyoshi Kuwano, Japanese singer and trumpet player
- 1958 – Peter Baltes, German bass player
- 1958 – Cazuza, Brazilian singer-songwriter (died 1990)
- 1958 – Rodney Eade, Australian footballer and coach
- 1958 – Constance Shulman, American actress
- 1959 – Phil Morris, American actor and screenwriter
- 1960 – Jonathan Agnew, English cricketer and sportscaster
- 1960 – Jane Eaglen, English soprano
- 1960 – Godknows Igali, Nigerian diplomat, civil servant and technocrat
- 1960 – Hugo Weaving, Nigerian-Australian actor and producer
- 1961 – Hildi Santo-Tomas, American interior decorator
- 1962 – Craig Adams, English bass player and songwriter
- 1962 – Kailasho Devi, Indian social worker and politician
- 1963 – A. Michael Baldwin, American actor, producer, and screenwriter
- 1963 – Jack Del Rio, American football player and coach
- 1963 – Dale Hawerchuk, Canadian ice hockey player and coach (died 2020)
- 1963 – Jane McDonald, English singer and broadcaster
- 1963 – Graham Norton, Irish actor and talk show host
- 1964 – Branco, Brazilian footballer and coach
- 1964 – Dr. Chud, American drummer and singer
- 1964 – Anthony Clark, American actor (died 2026)
- 1964 – David Cross, American actor, producer, and screenwriter
- 1964 – Satoshi Furukawa, Japanese surgeon and astronaut
- 1964 – Paul Parker, England international footballer and TV pundit
- 1964 – Đặng Thân, Vietnamese writer and poet
- 1965 – Vinny Burns, English guitarist and producer
- 1965 – Robert Downey Jr., American actor, producer, and screenwriter.
- 1966 – Nancy McKeon, American actress
- 1966 – Mike Starr, American bass player (died 2011)
- 1966 – Christos Tsekos, Greek basketball player
- 1967 – Edith Masai, Kenyan-German runner
- 1967 – George Mavrotas, Greek water polo player and politician
- 1968 – Jesús Rollán, Spanish water polo player (died 2006)
- 1969 – Piotr Anderszewski, Polish pianist and composer
- 1969 – Karren Brady, English journalist and businesswoman
- 1970 – Georgios Amanatidis, Greek footballer and manager
- 1970 – Dimitris Basis, Greek singer
- 1970 – Greg Garcia, American director, producer, and screenwriter
- 1970 – Barry Pepper, Canadian actor and producer
- 1970 – Jason Stoltenberg, Australian tennis player
- 1970 – Josh Todd, American singer-songwriter and actor
- 1970 – Yelena Yelesina, Russian high jumper
- 1971 – Clay Davidson, American singer-songwriter
- 1971 – Yanic Perreault, Canadian ice hockey player and coach
- 1971 – Malik Yusef, American actor, producer, and poet
- 1971 – John Zandig, American wrestler and promoter
- 1972 – Jim Dymock, Australian rugby league player and coach
- 1972 – Martin Rundkvist, Swedish archaeologist and professor
- 1972 – Jill Scott, American singer-songwriter and actress
- 1972 – Magnus Sveningsson, Swedish bass player
- 1973 – Chris Banks, American football player (died 2014)
- 1973 – David Blaine, American magician and producer
- 1973 – Loris Capirossi, Italian motorcycle racer
- 1973 – Peter Hoekstra, Dutch footballer and coach
- 1973 – Chris McCormack, Australian triathlete and coach
- 1973 – Kelly Price, American singer-songwriter
- 1975 – Delphine Arnault, French businesswoman
- 1975 – Thobias Fredriksson, Swedish skier
- 1975 – Joyce Giraud, Puerto Rican television actress and producer, Miss Puerto Rico 1994
- 1975 – Pamela Ribon, American actress, screenwriter, and author
- 1975 – Miranda Lee Richards, American singer-songwriter
- 1975 – Scott Rolen, American baseball player
- 1975 – Kevin Weekes, Canadian ice hockey player and sportscaster
- 1976 – Nathan Blacklock, Australian rugby player
- 1976 – Sébastien Enjolras, French race car driver (died 1997)
- 1976 – Emerson Ferreira da Rosa, Brazilian footballer
- 1976 – James Roday, American actor, director, and screenwriter
- 1977 – Stephan Bonnar, American mixed martial artist (died 2022)
- 1977 – Keith Bulluck, American football player and sportscaster
- 1977 – Adam Dutkiewicz, American guitarist, songwriter, and producer
- 1977 – Stephen Mulhern, English magician and television host
- 1977 – Omarr Smith, American football player and coach
- 1978 – Jason Ellison, American baseball player and scout
- 1978 – Alan Mahon, Irish footballer
- 1979 – Heath Ledger, Australian actor (died 2008)
- 1979 – Roberto Luongo, Canadian ice hockey player
- 1979 – Natasha Lyonne, American actress
- 1979 – Andy McKee, American guitarist
- 1979 – Maksim Opalev, Russian canoeist
- 1980 – Johnny Borrell, English singer-songwriter and guitarist
- 1980 – Trevor Moore, American actor, director, producer, and screenwriter (died 2021)
- 1980 – Eric Steinbach, American football player
- 1980 – Björn Wirdheim, Swedish race car driver
- 1981 – Currensy, American rapper
- 1981 – Eduardo Luís Carloto, Brazilian footballer
- 1981 – Casey Daigle, American baseball player
- 1981 – Anna Pyatykh, Russian triple jumper
- 1981 – Ned Vizzini, American author and screenwriter (died 2013)
- 1982 – Justin Cook, American voice actor and producer
- 1983 – Evgeny Artyukhin, Russian ice hockey player
- 1983 – Eric André, American comedian
- 1983 – Ben Gordon, American basketball player
- 1983 – Doug Lynch, Canadian ice hockey player
- 1983 – Natalie Pike, Scottish-English model and actress
- 1983 – Amanda Righetti, American actress
- 1984 – Sean May, American basketball player
- 1984 – Arkady Vyatchanin, Russian swimmer
- 1985 – Rudy Fernández, Spanish basketball player
- 1985 – Dudi Sela, Israeli tennis player
- 1985 – Ricardo Vilar, Brazilian footballer
- 1986 – Eunhyuk, South Korean singer-songwriter and dancer
- 1986 – Cameron Barker, Canadian ice hockey player
- 1986 – Maurice Manificat, French skier
- 1986 – Aiden McGeady, Scottish-born Irish footballer
- 1986 – Alexander Tettey, Norwegian footballer
- 1987 – Sami Khedira, German footballer
- 1987 – McDonald Mariga, Kenyan footballer
- 1987 – Cameron Maybin, American baseball player
- 1987 – Marcos Vellidis, Greek footballer
- 1987 – Sarah Gadon, Canadian actress
- 1988 – Frank Fielding, English footballer
- 1989 – Vurnon Anita, Dutch footballer
- 1989 – Steven Finn, English cricketer
- 1989 – Chris Herd, Australian footballer
- 1989 – Jens Toornstra, Dutch footballer
- 1990 – Elizabeth Booker Houston American lawyer, public health professional, stand‑up comedian, and political commentator.
- 1991 – Yui Koike, Japanese singer and actress
- 1991 – Asia Muhammad, American tennis player
- 1991 – Justin O'Neill, Australian rugby league player
- 1991 – Martín Pérez, Venezuelan baseball player
- 1991 – Jamie Lynn Spears, American actress and singer
- 1991 – Marlon Stöckinger, Filipino race car driver
- 1992 – Lucy May Barker, English actress and singer
- 1992 – Ricky Dillon, American YouTuber and singer
- 1993 – Daniela Bobadilla, Mexican-Canadian actress
- 1993 – Samir Carruthers, English footballer
- 1993 – David Soria, Spanish footballer
- 1993 – Frank Kaminsky, American basketball player
- 1994 – Shunsuke Nishikawa, Japanese actor
- 1994 – Risako Sugaya, Japanese singer and actress
- 1996 – Austin Mahone, American singer-songwriter and actor
- 2001 – Anzor Alem, Congolese actor and singer
- 2001 – Jalen Carter, American football player
- 2001 – Angelo Stiller, German footballer
- 2003 – Harvey Elliott, English footballer
- 2005 – Lil Mabu, American rapper
- 2006 – Grisha Putin, Russian streamer, gaming personality, and nationalist

== Deaths ==
=== Pre-1600 ===
- 397 – Ambrose, Roman archbishop and saint (born 338)
- 636 – Isidore of Seville, Spanish archbishop and saint (born 560)
- 814 – Plato of Sakkoudion, Byzantine monk and saint (born 735)
- 896 – Formosus, pope of the Catholic Church (born 816)
- 911 – Liu Yin, Chinese warlord and governor (born 874)
- 931 – Kong Xun, Chinese official and governor (born 884)
- 968 – Abu Firas al-Hamdani, Arab prince and poet (born 932)
- 991 – Reginold, bishop of Eichstätt
- 1284 – Alfonso X, king of Castile and León (born 1221)
- 1292 – Nicholas IV, pope of the Catholic Church (born 1227)
- 1406 – Robert III, king of Scotland (born 1337)
- 1483 – Henry Bourchier, 1st Earl of Essex (born c. 1405)
- 1536 – Frederick I, Margrave of Brandenburg-Ansbach (born 1460)
- 1538 – Elena Glinskaya, Grand Princess and regent of Russia
- 1588 – Frederick II, king of Denmark and Norway (born 1534)
- 1589 – Benedict the Moor, Sicilian Franciscan friar and saint (born 1526) 1
- 1596 – Philip II, Duke of Brunswick-Grubenhagen (born 1533)

=== 1601–1900 ===
- 1609 – Carolus Clusius, Flemish botanist, mycologist, and academic (born 1526)
- 1617 – John Napier, Scottish mathematician, physicist, and astronomer (born 1550)
- 1643 – Simon Episcopius, Dutch theologian and academic (born 1583)
- 1661 – Alexander Leslie, 1st Earl of Leven, Scottish field marshal (born 1580)
- 1743 – Daniel Neal, English historian and author (born 1678)
- 1761 – Théodore Gardelle, Swiss painter (born 1722)
- 1766 – John Taylor, English librarian and scholar (born 1704)
- 1774 – Oliver Goldsmith, Irish novelist, playwright and poet (born 1728)
- 1792 – James Sykes, American lawyer and politician (born 1725)
- 1807 – Jérôme Lalande, French astronomer and academic (born 1732)
- 1817 – André Masséna, French general (born 1758)
- 1841 – William Henry Harrison, American general and politician, 9th President of the United States (born 1773)
- 1846 – Solomon Sibley, American lawyer and politician, 1st Mayor of Detroit (born 1769)
- 1861 – John McLean, American jurist and politician, 6th United States Postmaster General (born 1785)
- 1863 – Ludwig Emil Grimm, German painter and engraver (born 1790)
- 1864 – Joseph Pitty Couthouy, American commander and paleontologist (born 1808)
- 1870 – Heinrich Gustav Magnus, German chemist and physicist (born 1802)
- 1874 – Charles Ernest Beulé, French archaeologist and politician (born 1826)
- 1875 – Karl Mauch, German geographer and explorer (born 1837)
- 1878 – Richard M. Brewer, American criminal (born 1850)
- 1879 – Heinrich Wilhelm Dove, German physicist and meteorologist (born 1803)
- 1883 – Peter Cooper, American businessman and philanthropist, founded Cooper Union (born 1791)
- 1890 – Pierre-Joseph-Olivier Chauveau, Canadian lawyer and politician, 1st Premier of Quebec (born 1820)
- 1890 – Edmond Hébert, French geologist and academic (born 1812)

=== 1901–present ===
- 1912 – Charles Brantley Aycock, American lawyer and politician, 50th Governor of North Carolina (born 1859)
- 1912 – Isaac K. Funk, American minister, lexicographer, and publisher, co-founded Funk & Wagnalls (born 1839)
- 1913 – Emmanouil Argyropoulos, Greek pioneer aviator (born 1889)
- 1913 – Konstantinos Manos, Greek politician, poet, soldier and sportsman (born 1869)
- 1919 – William Crookes, English chemist and physicist (born 1832)
- 1919 – Francisco Marto, Portuguese saint (born 1908)
- 1923 – John Venn, English mathematician and philosopher, created the Venn diagram (born 1834)
- 1928 – Konstantinos Maleas, Greek painter (born 1879)
- 1929 – Karl Benz, German engineer and businessman, founded Mercedes-Benz (born 1844)
- 1931 – André Michelin, French businessman, co-founded the Michelin Tyre Company (born 1853)
- 1932 – Wilhelm Ostwald, Latvian-German chemist and academic, Nobel Prize laureate (born 1853)
- 1933 – Elizabeth Bacon Custer, American author and educator (born 1842)
- 1944 – Morris H. Whitehouse, American architect (born 1878)
- 1945 – Berta Bock, Romanian composer (born 1857)
- 1951 – George Albert Smith, American religious leader, 8th President of The Church of Jesus Christ of Latter-day Saints (born 1870)
- 1953 – Carol II of Romania (born 1893)
- 1957 – E. Herbert Norman, Canadian historian and diplomat (born 1909)
- 1958 – Johnny Stompanato, American soldier and bodyguard (born 1925)
- 1959 – Florence Goodenough, American child psychologist (born 1886)
- 1961 – Harald Riipalu, Estonian military commander (born 1912)
- 1961 – Simion Stoilow, Romanian mathematician and academic (born 1873)
- 1963 – Oskari Tokoi, Finnish socialist and the Chairman of the Senate of Finland (born 1873)
- 1967 – Al Lewis, American songwriter (born 1901)
- 1967 – Héctor Scarone, Uruguayan footballer and manager (born 1898)
- 1968 – Martin Luther King Jr., American minister and activist, Nobel Prize laureate (assassinated) (born 1929)
- 1972 – Adam Clayton Powell Jr., American pastor and politician (born 1908)
- 1972 – Stefan Wolpe, German-American composer and academic (born 1902)
- 1976 – Harry Nyquist, Swedish engineer and theorist (born 1889)
- 1977 – Andrey Dikiy, Ukrainian-American journalist, historian, and politician (born 1893)
- 1979 – Zulfikar Ali Bhutto, Pakistani lawyer and politician, 4th President of Pakistan (born 1928)
- 1979 – Edgar Buchanan, American actor (born 1903)
- 1980 – Red Sovine, American singer-songwriter and guitarist (born 1917)
- 1983 – Gloria Swanson, American actress (born 1899)
- 1983 – Bernard Vukas, Croatian football player, played for 1953 FIFA's "Rest of the World" team against England at Wembley (born 1927)
- 1984 – Oleg Antonov, Russian-Ukrainian engineer and businessman, founded Antonov Design Bureau (born 1906)
- 1985 – Kate Roberts, Welsh author and activist (born 1891)
- 1987 – C. L. Moore, American author and academic (born 1911)
- 1987 – Chögyam Trungpa, Tibetan guru, poet, and scholar (born 1939)
- 1987 – Sachchidananda Vatsyayan, Indian journalist and author (born 1911)
- 1991 – Edmund Adamkiewicz, German footballer (born 1920)
- 1991 – Max Frisch, Swiss playwright and novelist (born 1911)
- 1991 – H. John Heinz III, American soldier and politician (born 1938)
- 1991 – Graham Ingels, American illustrator (born 1915)
- 1992 – Yvette Brind'Amour, Canadian actress and director (born 1918)
- 1992 – Jack Hamilton, Australian footballer (born 1928)
- 1992 – Arthur Russell, American singer-songwriter and cellist (born 1951)
- 1993 – Alfred Mosher Butts, American game designer, invented Scrabble (born 1899)
- 1993 – Douglas Leopold, Canadian radio and television host (born 1947)
- 1995 – Kenny Everett, English radio and television host (born 1944)
- 1995 – Priscilla Lane, American actress (born 1915)
- 1996 – Barney Ewell, American runner and long jumper (born 1918)
- 1996 – Boone Guyton, American lieutenant and pilot (born 1913)
- 1997 – Leo Picard, German-Israeli geologist and academic (born 1900)
- 1997 – Alparslan Türkeş, Turkish colonel and politician, 39th Deputy Prime Minister of Turkey (born 1917)
- 1999 – Lucille Lortel, American actress, artistic director and producer (born 1900)
- 1999 – Early Wynn, American baseball player and sportscaster (born 1920)
- 2001 – Liisi Oterma, Finnish astronomer (born 1915)
- 2001 – Ed Roth, American illustrator and engineer (born 1932)
- 2001 – Maury Van Vliet, American-Canadian academic (born 1913)
- 2003 – Anthony Caruso, American actor (born 1916)
- 2004 – Briek Schotte, Belgian cyclist and coach (born 1919)
- 2005 – Edward Bronfman, Canadian businessman and philanthropist (born 1924)
- 2007 – Bob Clark, American actor, director, producer, and screenwriter (born 1941)
- 2007 – Karen Spärck Jones, English computer scientist and academic (born 1935)
- 2008 – Francis Tucker, South African race car driver (born 1923)
- 2009 – Maxine Cooper, American actress, activist and photographer (born 1924)
- 2011 – Scott Columbus, American drummer (born 1956)
- 2011 – Ned McWherter, American politician, 46th Governor of Tennessee (born 1930)
- 2011 – Juliano Mer-Khamis, Israeli actor, director, and activist (born 1958)
- 2012 – A. Dean Byrd, American psychologist and academic (born 1948)
- 2012 – Dimitris Christoulas, Greek pensioner who committed suicide in public (born 1935)
- 2012 – Anne Karin Elstad, Norwegian author and educator (born 1938)
- 2012 – Claude Miller, French director, producer, and screenwriter (born 1942)
- 2012 – Dubravko Pavličić, Croatian footballer (born 1967)
- 2012 – Roberto Rexach Benítez, Puerto Rican academic and politician, 10th President of the Senate of Puerto Rico (born 1929)
- 2013 – Bengt Blomgren, Swedish actor, director, and screenwriter (born 1923)
- 2013 – Roger Ebert, American journalist, critic, and screenwriter (born 1942)
- 2013 – Carmine Infantino, American illustrator (born 1925)
- 2013 – Tommy Tycho, Hungarian-Australian pianist, composer, and conductor (born 1928)
- 2013 – Ian Walsh, Australian rugby player and coach (born 1933)
- 2013 – Noboru Yamaguchi, Japanese author (born 1972)
- 2014 – İsmet Atlı, Turkish wrestler and trainer (born 1931)
- 2014 – Wayne Henderson, American trombonist and producer (born 1939)
- 2014 – Kumba Ialá, Bissau-Guinean soldier and politician, President of Guinea-Bissau (born 1953)
- 2014 – Margo MacDonald, Scottish journalist and politician (born 1943)
- 2014 – Curtis Bill Pepper, American journalist and author (born 1917)
- 2014 – Muhammad Qutb, Egyptian author and academic (born 1919)
- 2015 – Jamaluddin Jarjis, Malaysian engineer and politician (born 1951)
- 2015 – Elmer Lach, Canadian ice hockey player and coach (born 1918)
- 2015 – Donald N. Levine, American sociologist and academic (born 1931)
- 2015 – Klaus Rifbjerg, Danish author and poet (born 1931)
- 2016 – Chus Lampreave, Spanish actress (born 1930)
- 2024 – Lynne Reid Banks, British author (born 1929)
- 2024 – Thomas Gumbleton, American Roman Catholic prelate (born 1930)
- 2024 – Pat Zachry, American baseball player (born 1952)
- 2025 – Manoj Kumar, Indian actor, director, producer, and screenwriter (born 1937)
- 2025 – Tony Rundle, Australian politician, 40th Premier of Tasmania (born 1939)

== Holidays and observances ==
- Children's Day (Hong Kong, Taiwan)
- Christian feast day:
  - Benedict the Moor
  - Gaetano Catanoso
  - Isidore of Seville
  - Martin Luther King Jr. (Episcopal Church (USA))
  - Reginald Heber (Anglican Church of Canada)
  - Tigernach of Clones
  - Plato of Sakkoudion
  - April 4 (Eastern Orthodox liturgics)
- Independence Day, celebrates the independence of Senegal from France (1960).
- Peace Day (Angola)
- One of the possible days for Qingming Festival.
- NATO Day
