= Scandale (film) =

1982 film by George Mihalka

- Directed by: George Mihalka
- Written by: Robert Geoffrion
- Produced by: Robert Lantos
- Starring: Sophie Lorain; Gilbert Comptois
- Cinematography: François Protat
- Edited by: Michaël Karen; Rit Wallis
- Music by: Tony Roman
- Production company: Films RSL
- Distributed by: Ambassador Film Distributors
- Release date: 7 May 1982 (Canada)
- Running time: 81 / 97 minutes
- Country: Canada
- Language: French
- Budget: $450 000

Scandale is a 1982 Canadian (Québec) comedy film.

The plot is a reference to current events at the time of the film's creation. The response of a Parti Québécois government under René Lévesque to the recession of the early 1980s included harsh cutbacks to civil service pay which angered labour union members, a core part of the constituency of the PQ and sovereignty movement. In real life, the move would cost the party the next election.

In the film, a band of government workers affected by budget cutbacks at the Ministry of Culture decide to make some fast bucks by making a blue movie in the Legislative Assembly of Quebec. Their finished product is unexpectedly entered into competition at the Cannes Film Festival in order to showcase Québec's culture, shocking government officials.

== Pornobec scandal ==
The "Pornobec" movie production depicted within this film is a reference to a then-current political event known as the "Pornobec scandal". In November 1981, members of Claude Charron's staff had been exposed by a television network for using the Legislative Assembly's video equipment to view and to duplicate pornographic films. The initial reports contained allegations that the Assembly's video equipment was used to make a pornographic video, presumably at the legislature building itself, causing the incident to be quickly ridiculed by the opposition Liberal Party of Quebec. One example of Liberal derision (reported in a November 1981 Montreal Gazette column) claimed the scandal "gives a whole new meaning to the term 'intra-provincial relations'".

As the film was a parody of a current event, it was hastily written and produced for release on a tight schedule. The script was complete by December 11 with pre-production in December 1981 and the movie itself shot on 16 mm film between January 11 and February 2, 1982, on a modest $450 000 budget for theatrical release on May 7, 1982. To meet scheduling constraints, filming often took place both day and night.

While the allegations of viewing and duplication of pornography on legislative assembly video equipment would stand, the claim that an explicit film had actually been produced by civil servants in the assembly building was ultimately debunked. The political damage, however, was already done, with "Pornobec" as the title of pornographic video having found its way into a real film.

== Reception ==
Initial reception by critics was harsh, largely because the film had been hastily constructed as a low-budget montage which interleaved mainstream cinema and low-brow humour with footage which (while moderate by modern standards) would have been considered crudely pornographic in the era this movie was made.

Although it was universally panned by critics, the film still managed to secure a Genie Award nomination for its theme song, Call Girl, performed by Nanette Workman.

The film, originally intended for audiences in Québec, was initially released to cinemas in French with no subtitles. A version was released on VHS and the movie was dubbed to English for national broadcast on various fledgling Canadian pay television premium channels which began operation in 1983. As the movie is topical to 1981 and therefore now out of print, there is no DVD release.

== Cast ==
- Sophie Lorain - Lucille
- Nanette Workman - Nanette Workman
- Sylvie Boucher : Pauline
- Gilbert Comptois - Rousseau
- Rose Ouellette : Jeanne Renoir
- Jean-Guy Moreau : Poitras
- Douglas Leopold - Coco
- Robert Desroches - Ministre Gosselin
- Roger Garceau : Ministre français

== Production credits ==
- Georges Mihalka - Director
- François Protat - Cinematographer
- Rick Wallace - Editor
- Wendy Grean - Production Manager
- Tony Roman - Composer (Music Score)
- Richard Lightstone - Sound/Sound Designer
- Germain Gauthier - Composer (Music Score)
- Frances Calder - Set Designer
- Luc Plamondon - Songwriter
- Robert Geoffrion - Screenwriter
- Csaba Kertész - Art Director
