= Sarah Mutch =

Canadian fashion model and actress

- Occupations: Actress, model
- Years active: 1997–present

Sarah Mutch is a Canadian fashion model and actress. She is best known for the Guess campaigns, Italian Vogue, Maxim covers and commercials. Mutch has also starred in films including Chillerama, Funkytown and The Seamstress.

== Career ==
Sarah began her professional career when she was discovered by Jeff Palffy in Vancouver, British Columbia. She moved to New York City to continue her career after a year into it. She made her acting debut in the television series Smallville (2001-2011). She guest starred in the television series Supernatural released in 2006. Sarah had a role in Jake 2.0.

Sarah has appeared in the multiple shows and has made various appearances in magazines like Vogue, Cosmopolitan, and Elle. She took the lead role in the 2011 Canadian movie, Funkytown which debuted at the Toronto film festival in September 2010.

She was featured on the May and June 2010 cover of Ocean Drive.

== Credits ==
=== Movies ===
Year	Film	Role	Notes
2011	Chillerama	Louise	Segment: "Wadzilla"
2011	Funkytown	Adriana	
2009	The Seamstress	Lizzie	

=== Television ===
Year	Television	Role	Notes
2009	Stargate Universe	Adriana	Episode: "Earth"
2006	Supernatural	Brandi	Episode: "Provenance
2005	Smallville	Melissa Page	Episode: "Exposed"
2005	Jake 2.0	Model #1	Episode: The Good, the Bad, and the Geeky
2002	Special Unit 2	Elanna	Episode: The Wish

== Personal life ==
Sarah married real estate businessman Kurt Rappaport. Kurt is the CEO of the Beverly-Hills based Westside Estate Agency. They became engaged in 2015 and married in 2017. The two divorced in 2019.

== Recognition ==
- Ranked 67th on the maxim magazine hot 100 of the 2008 list.
- Maxim's world's sexiest supermodel of 2008.
