= Gogo (Quebec music) =

Gogo was a type of francophone music that was popular in the 1960s in Quebec, Canada. It accompanied dancing that was characterised by lively, quick and irregular movements of the body and wide gestures of the arms. The words and music were often adapted from contemporary hits of pop music from the United States (with or without permission and payment of royalties to the creators or rights-holders of the original music). The dance clubs "boîtes à gogo" that catered to it gave way to discothèques when the fashion for gogo gave way to disco at the beginning of the 1970s. In 1966, the Quebec singer Michèle Richard recorded a song titled "Les Boîtes à Gogo", whose accompanying 16mm Scopitone film illustrates both the dance style and the atmosphere in these clubs.

One of the subplots of the 2010 Canadian film Funkytown involves how the rise of disco in Montreal ended the fashion for gogo and the careers of gogo singers.

== Sample recordings ==
- Manon, "Si vous connaissez quelque chose de pire qu'un vampire" [sound disc: analog 45 rpm.], Montreal (Quebec): Jupiter, 1967.
- Marie-Sylvie "On retourne à l'école" [sound disc : analog 45 rpm.], Saint-Laurent (Quebec): Élite, 1970[?]
- Cy Cohen, Frank Gérald "Pas une place pour me garer!" [sound disc: analog 45 rpm.], Sherbrooke (Quebec): Succès Match, 1965[?]
