= Douglas Leopold =

Canadian broadcaster (1944–1993)

Douglas Leopold, nicknamed Coco (Oct 1, 1943 – April 4, 1993), was a television and radio personality in Quebec, along with being a public relations specialist.

Douglas Leopold studied political science and music at McGill University and the Sorbonne. Upon his return to Montreal, Leopold first worked in public relations for the Saidye Bronfman Centre for the Arts (now the Segal Centre for Performing Arts) and Les Grands Ballets Canadiens.

His professional introduction to disco came in promoting the Montreal branch of Régine (an international chain of discotheques presided over by Régine Zylberberg). This in turn led to a radio show with CKMF-FM, an association which lasted from 1979 to 1988. He then moved to Los Angeles to work in public relations for Universal Studios Theme Parks.

Leopold was openly gay and earned the nickname Coco because he peppered his speech with this expression, as a form of punctuation. He appeared as "Coco" in Scandale (1982) and made many appearances on local television, identifying and commenting on new trends in fashion and lifestyles. Leopold's key concept was the jet set, which he did not identify simply with money or extravagance, but rather a certain conception of good taste and appropriate conduct.

Leopold was sued by Alain Montpetit, another Montreal media personality (and like Leopold, also worked at CKMF), when he accused him on air of the murder of a model. This led to the payment of a settlement of thirty thousand dollars to Montpetit. Two decades later, the case was reopened by the New York City Police, who received statements from a number of witnesses which linked Montpetit to the murder. These included a confession, from the woman who had provided Montpetit's alibi, that she had lied about Montpetit being with her.

While Leopold continued to publicly claim, even a few months before his death, that he was in perfect health and did not have AIDS, he died of this very illness on 6 April 1993, at the Chris Brownlie Hospice in Los Angeles.

A fictionalised version of Leopold, played by Paul Doucet, is one of the central characters in the 2010 Canadian film Funkytown. Steve Galluccio, the scriptwriter for the film, had in fact once been interviewed by Leopold to be his assistant.
