= Limelight (Montreal) =

Former nightclub in Montreal, Quebec

Coordinates: 45.4989°N 73.5731°W

Lime Light
- Le Lime Light
- Address: 1254 Stanley Street; Montreal; Canada
- Owner: Yvon Lafrance
- Type: Nightclub and discotheque

Construction
- Opened: 7 September 1973
- Closed: 17 June 1990
- Reopened: 1997

Lime Light, also written Le Lime Light or simply Limelight, was a nightclub and discotheque in Montreal, Quebec, Canada. Located on Stanley Street in downtown Montreal, the club became one of the best-known venues of the city's disco era during the 1970s and early 1980s.

The club was known for disco music, celebrity clientele, elaborate lighting systems, and its role in Montreal nightlife culture. DJ Robert Ouimet was the club's best-known resident DJ and became one of the most recognized disco DJs in North America during the period.

== History ==
Lime Light opened on 7 September 1973 at 1254 Stanley Street in downtown Montreal. The club was founded by Yvon Lafrance after visits to New York nightlife venues during the early 1970s.

The name was inspired by Charlie Chaplin's 1952 film Limelight. Lafrance later stated that he wanted to create a club focused on music, atmosphere, lighting, and sound quality rather than traditional cabaret entertainment.

During the 1970s, Montreal became a major North American disco market, and Lime Light was among the city's best-known clubs. The venue attracted anglophone and francophone patrons, tourists, celebrities, musicians, gay and straight clientele, and members of Montreal's fashion and nightlife scenes.

The club became associated with Montreal's reputation as a disco destination during the late 1970s. Tourisme Montréal later described Lime Light as one of the defining venues of the city's disco era.

== Robert Ouimet ==
Robert Ouimet served as Lime Light's principal house DJ from 1973 until 1981. During that period, he became one of the best-known DJs in Canada and the United States disco circuit.

According to Tourisme Montréal, Ouimet was named best North American DJ by Rolling Stone in 1976 and received Billboard magazine's DJ of the Year Award in 1977.

Ouimet became known for importing records from New York and introducing new disco and dance tracks to Montreal audiences before they became commercially widespread.

== Music and clientele ==
Lime Light was associated primarily with disco music, though later years included dance-pop and early electronic dance music.

The club became known for its lighting systems, mirrored interiors, dance floor, and large sound system.

Artists and celebrities associated with the club included Grace Jones, James Brown, David Bowie, Rick James, Iggy Pop, Gloria Gaynor, and Alice Cooper.

According to Robert Ouimet, the venue attracted a socially mixed crowd unusual for the period, including Black, white, gay, straight, francophone, and anglophone patrons.

== Later years ==
Lime Light's most prominent period occurred during the 1970s disco era, though the club continued operating afterward in different forms.

The original era of the venue ended on 17 June 1990.

In 1997, the club reopened under new management by Dany K Kouri, Marc-André Desautels, and Roger Desautels. The later version of the club focused more heavily on dance music and disco revival events.

The second incarnation closed in 2001.

== Legacy ==
Lime Light is frequently cited in retrospectives about Montreal nightlife and disco culture.

The club has been compared to New York's Studio 54 because of its celebrity clientele, disco-era prominence, and role in late-1970s nightlife culture.

Music historians and journalists have identified the venue as an important part of Montreal's emergence as a major disco city during the 1970s.

The club was also referenced as inspiration for aspects of the 2011 Quebec film Funkytown, which depicted Montreal disco culture during the late 1970s.

== See also ==
- Disco
- Studio 54
- Culture of Montreal
- Nightclub
- Robert Ouimet
- Funkytown (film)
