= Little Italy (2018 film) =

2018 film by Donald Petrie

- Theatrical release poster
- Directed by: Donald Petrie
- Screenplay by: Steve Galluccio; Vinay Virmani
- Story by: Vinay Virmani
- Produced by: Vinay Virmani; Ajay Virmani; Pauline Dhillon
- Starring: Emma Roberts; Hayden Christensen; Alyssa Milano; Adam Ferrara; Gary Basaraba; Linda Kash; Andrew Phung; Cristina Rosato; Danny Aiello; Andrea Martin; Jane Seymour
- Cinematography: Thom Best
- Edited by: Michele Conroy
- Music by: Mateo Messina
- Production companies: Firsttake Entertainment; Telefilm Canada; Voltage Pictures; GEM Entertainment; Grindstone Entertainment Group
- Distributed by: Entertainment One (Canada); Lionsgate (United States)
- Release dates: August 24, 2018 (Canada); September 21, 2018 (United States)
- Running time: 102 minutes
- Countries: Canada; United States
- Language: English
- Budget: CA$8 million
- Box office: $1.4 million

Little Italy is a 2018 romantic comedy film directed by Donald Petrie, with a screenplay by Steve Galluccio and Vinay Virmani from a story by Virmani. The film stars Emma Roberts, Hayden Christensen, Alyssa Milano, Adam Ferrara, Gary Basaraba, Linda Kash, Andrew Phung, Cristina Rosato, Danny Aiello, Andrea Martin and Jane Seymour. The film features one of Aiello's final film appearances before his death in 2019.

== Plot ==
Nikki and Leo grow up together in Toronto's Little Italy neighborhood, where their families run a pizzeria. After winning a pizza competition, a feud developed between Nikki's father Sal and Leo's father Vince which caused them to dissolve their partnership and start separate restaurants side by side. The reason for the feud is a secret.

Nikki eventually trains to become a chef in London, while Leo remains in Toronto to work at his father's restaurant. Several years later, Nikki is given the chance to compete for a position to run her instructor Corinne's new restaurant. Corinne gives Nikki two weeks off to prepare her menu and get a work visa from Canada.

Leo still works at his father's restaurant but now lives with his friend Luigi above Luigi's bar, where Leo also bartends. The feud between Vince and Sal has escalated over the years.

Upon arriving in Toronto, Nikki meets Leo at the bar and they drunkenly play soccer during a thunderstorm. She passes out and spends the night at Leo's, while he sleeps on the couch. The next day, Nikki is welcomed by her family.

Vince and Jogi are arrested after Sal and his Indian employee Jessie replace the oregano at Vince's restaurant with marijuana, but are soon released. Jessie and Jogi share a mutual unspoken attraction, despite working for the rival restaurants. Additionally, Leo's grandfather Carlo and Nikki's grandmother Franca have been secretly dating, only outwardly participating in the feud.

Nikki's mother and friends try to set her up with men from the neighborhood, but she is uninterested. Growing closer to Leo as they cook together at his apartment, Nikki is impressed with his creativity and cooking skills. Carlo proposes to Franca, professing his love, but she walks away without responding.

Nikki encourages Leo to serve his pizza out of Vince's restaurant, but he tells her his father is stubborn and opposed to changing the menu. He hopes to open his own restaurant after his father retires, so he will not have to compete.

Franca finally agrees to marry Carlo despite her promise not to remarry after her husband died. Nikki and Leo ride around Little Italy, reliving their childhood. Returning to Leo's apartment, they sleep together. Corinne calls to remind Nikki that she needs the menu in a few days, otherwise she will promote another chef. Struggling, Nikki expresses her regrets to Leo.

Franca and Carlo arrange a dinner with the families to announce their relationship, without revealing their engagement. Upset, Sal and Vince begin exchanging insults. Vince proposes entering a pizza competition against Sal so whoever loses leaves Little Italy. Reminded they are banned from participating, they suggest Nikki and Leo enter for them. Nikki initially refuses, and Vince asserts it is because she's afraid to face Leo. Nikki and Leo start arguing about who let who win in soccer when they were kids. He makes a reference to them sleeping together the night before, so she slaps him and angrily storms out.

At the competition, Leo is declared the winner and Nikki departs to the airport for London. However, he refuses to take the trophy after realizing that Nikki had purposely switched their sauces so he would win. Discovering that Nikki has gone to the airport, Leo and their families follow. There, Leo finds Nikki and declares that all he wants is her and that he is in love with her. Although initially seeming to reject him, she ultimately chooses Leo. Confessing she loves him too, they kiss.

Confronting their fathers' about their age old fight, they reveal it was indirectly about their parents Franca and Carlo. In 1999, after winning the pizza competition, they argued about who to name the winning pizza after, resulting in the beginning of the rivalry. Franca and Carlo finally announce their engagement. Their sons hug, formally ending the feud.

Some time later, the families celebrate at Nikki and Leo's new restaurant. Corinne, who came to Toronto to convince Nikki to return to London, reveals she had to close her new restaurant after receiving negative critic reviews. The families all dance together, and Nikki and Leo finally help Jessie and Jogi get together.

== Cast ==
- Emma Roberts as Nicoletta "Nikki" Angioli
  - Ava Preston as young Nikki
- Hayden Christensen as Leonard "Leo" Campoli
  - Nicky Cappella as young Leo
- Alyssa Milano as Dora Angioli
- Adam Ferrara as Salvatore "Sal" Angioli
- Gary Basaraba as Vincenzo "Vince" Campoli
- Linda Kash as Amelia Campoli
- Andrew Phung as Li Zhaoping aka "Luigi"
- Cristina Rosato as Gina
- Danny Aiello as Carlo
- Andrea Martin as Franca
- Jane Seymour as Corinne
- Amrit Kaur as Jessie
- Martin Roach as Officer Hardaz
- Vas Saranga as Jogi
- Rodrigo Fernandez-Stoll as Ramon

== Production ==
In July 2017, it was announced Hayden Christensen, Emma Roberts, Andrea Martin, Alyssa Milano, Danny Aiello, Adam Ferrara, Gary Basaraba, Andrew Phung, and Jane Seymour had joined the cast of the film, with Donald Petrie directing from a screenplay by Steve Galluccio and Vinay Virmani. Pauline Dhillon and Ajay Virmani served as producers on the film, while Fred Fuchs, Tiffany Kuzon, Patrick Roy and Christina Kubacki served as executive producers, under their Firsttake Entertainment, Telefilm Canada and Gem Entertainment banners, respectively. Entertainment One handled distribution in Canada.

Principal photography was completed on June 22, 2017.

== Release ==
The film was released in Canada on August 24, 2018, by Entertainment One and in the United States on September 21, 2018, by Lionsgate.

== Reception ==
The review aggregator Rotten Tomatoes reported that 13% of critics have given the film a positive review, based on 24 reviews, with an average rating of 3.9/10. On Metacritic, the film has a weighted average score of 28 out of 100, based on 4 critics, indicating "generally unfavorable" reviews. Writing in the Chicago Sun-Times, film critic Richard Roeper described the film as "extra-cheesy and terrible, but there IS a certain comfort-viewing pleasure to be had from watching the wonderful cast gamely attempting to sell exchanges." Katie Walsh of the Los Angeles Times described the film as "more about cartoonish cultural stereotypes than finding love," "limp and formulaic", and featuring "wildly outdated cultural stereotypes about Italian New Yorkers, Indian folks, gay people and others." Barry Hertz of The Globe and Mail wrote that "Emma Roberts and Hayden Christensen...deserve so much better than the wan caricatures they are stuck with" and that the film "is either a remarkable act of misguided self-parody – a work so subversive that any trace of artistic irony ends up being invisible to the naked eye – or a solid case that its filmmaker fundamentally misunderstands the modern world."

The movie was considered one of the worst movies of the year. It was the pick for episode 206 of the podcast How Did This Get Made?, which discusses unusually terrible films. The trailers for the film were widely mocked on social media when released. The movie failed to get a wide theatrical release, screening in just a handful of theatres and being made available on demand while still in theatres.

== See also ==
- Mystic Pizza, a 1988 romantic film with a similar pizza restaurant setting and also directed by Donald Petrie
- Pizza My Heart, a 2005 romantic-comedy featuring a similar premise of two competing pizza restaurants
