= The Seamstress (2009 film) =

- Directed by: Jesse James Miller
- Written by: Mark Garbett; David Andrew Lloyd; Bob Hume
- Produced by: Andrew Bronstein
- Starring: Kailin See; David Kopp; James Kirk; Lara Gilchrist; Richard Stroh; Sarah Mutch; Kevin McNulty; Lance Henriksen
- Cinematography: Corey Robson
- Edited by: Charlie Renfrew
- Music by: Jeffery Alan Jones
- Production company: PHD Productions
- Distributed by: DLN Films; Elephant Films; Image Entertainment; Regency Media
- Release date: February 7, 2009
- Running time: 72 minutes
- Country: Canada
- Language: English
- Budget: $1,500,000

The Seamstress is a 2009 Canadian slasher film directed by Jesse James Miller. In the film, a curse from a woman being tortured by a mob awakens a specter. The specter terrorizes a group of friends who arrive on an island to search for the missing father of the group's leader.

== Reception ==
Dread Central gave the film a mixed review, saying that while it's "a great looking low budget horror movie", it "was a 75-minute movie where very little happened until the film is already halfway over and what did happen wasn't worth the wait." HorrorNews.net's review said that the film "wasn't horrible" and "had the potential, but for one reason or another never came close to living up to that potential."
