= Alain Montpetit =

Canadian television and radio personality

Alain Montpetit (September 24, 1950 – June 10, 1987) was a Canadian television and radio personality in Quebec, as well as an actor.

Montpetit was a native of Westmount, where he was born and where he grew up. His grandfather was Édouard Montpetit, founder of the Faculty of Social Sciences at the University of Montreal. He was the son of André Montpetit, a prominent labour lawyer, founding chair of the board of the Institut de recherches cliniques de Montréal and a judge of the Quebec Superior Court, chairing the Commission of Inquiry into Working Conditions in the Post Office 1966.

Montpetit studied at the National Theatre School of Canada and UCLA. During his days in the United States, he worked at KMET/Los Angeles, California and ran a pirate radio station near the Canada–United States border. On his return to Montreal, in the early 1970s he became a full-time airstaffer at CKGM. After that stint at the Top 40 AM outlet, he would take the offer of being the host of a radio show on CKMF-FM at the start of the fashion for disco. Thanks to the station's emphasis on disco, it went from 48,000 listeners to around 500,000. Montpetit was also hired to host a disco dance show on Montréal's private French-language TV station, Télé-Métropole.

According to François Roy, a friend and colleague at the time, Montpetit did not particularly like disco music. However, he took advantage of the opportunity and was known as Montreal's "King of Disco", accepting sizable payment in cash or drugs from various club owners for spending time at their establishments.

Although Montpetit was married to classical ballet dancer Nanci Moretti and had two children with her, he had brief encounters with many other women. He had a more serious affair with Paule Charbonneau. One of Charbonneau's friends was Marie-Josée Saint-Antoine, a model from Montreal with the Elite agency, who was to move to New York City. On a visit back to Quebec in June 1982, Saint-Antoine convinced her friend to break up with Montpetit and communicated this decision to him.

Saint-Antoine was stabbed to death, on 17 June 1982, upon her return to New York City. Strong circumstantial evidence ties Montpetit to this murder. Among other things, he gave an alibi to police which, much later, was revealed to be false. A witness saw a man who looked like him with Saint-Antoine shortly before she was killed.

Douglas Coco Leopold, who also worked for CKMF and was a prominent disco radio and TV personality, accused Montpetit of the murder on the air. Montpetit sued Leopold for defamation and the case was settled out of court.

In June 1987, Montpetit went on air while he was evidently under the influence, as he had on some other occasions. The manager of the station advised him to get help and assured him that his job would be there for him. He was scheduled to go into a rehab on the 12th of June. He travelled to Washington DC on the 9th of June and was found dead of an overdose in a Washington hotel room. He was 36 years old. He was buried in the Notre Dame des Neiges Cemetery in Montreal.

A fictionalised version of Montpetit, played by Patrick Huard, is one of the central characters in the 2010 Canadian film Funkytown.
