= Funkytown (film) =

2011 Canadian drama film

- Directed by: Daniel Roby
- Written by: Steve Galluccio
- Produced by: Simon Trottier; André Rouleau
- Starring: Patrick Huard; Justin Chatwin; Sarah Mutch; Paul Doucet; Raymond Bouchard; François Létourneau; Romina D'Ugo
- Cinematography: Ronald Plante
- Edited by: Yvann Thibaudeau
- Music by: Jean Robitaille
- Production companies: Telefilm Canada; Caramel Film; The Harold Greenberg Fund
- Distributed by: Remstar Films
- Release dates: March 4, 2011 (Canada); October 2, 2012 (United States)
- Running time: 132 minutes
- Country: Canada
- Languages: English; French
- Budget: CAD $7.2 million

Funkytown is a 2011 Canadian drama film directed by Daniel Roby and written by Steve Galluccio. starring Patrick Huard, Justin Chatwin, Paul Doucet, Sarah Mutch and Raymond Bouchard.

== Plot summary ==
Set in Montreal during the disco era, the film revolves around the Starlight, a fictionalized version of Montreal's famed Lime Light discothèque. It depicts this world starting in 1976, when Montreal was considered one of the world's top nightclub destinations, through to 1980, when the fashion for disco was about to experience a sharp decline. By the early 1980s political issues such as Quebec's 1980 independence referendum had fractured and polarized the city, and Montreal had also begun to experience a decade of economic decline. By then, it had ceased to be the largest city in Canada, and had ceased as well to be Canada's financial and industrial centre.

== Cast ==
- Patrick Huard as Bastien Lavallée, an influential radio and television personality. Lavallée is a fictionalized version of real-life Montreal radio and television personality Alain Montpetit.
- Justin Chatwin as Tino Deifiori, a young Italian waiter and disco dancer
- Paul Doucet as Jonathan Aaronson, a flamboyant gay radio, television and fashion personality and trendsetter (a fictionalised version of Douglas Coco Leopold)
- Raymond Bouchard as Gilles Lefebvre, a record producer and impresario who runs the club with his son Daniel
- Geneviève Brouillette as Mimi, a former Gogo singer now down on her luck
- Sarah Mutch as Adriana, a model who wants to become a disco singer
- François Létourneau as Daniel, Gilles Lefebvre's son
- Sophie Cadieux as Helene, Daniel Lefebvre's secretary
- Romina D'Ugo as Tino's girlfriend
- Jocelyne Zucco as Nicole
- Janine Theriault as Connie
- Dominic Longo as Carlo
- David Tyler as DJ Scratch

== Production ==
In June 2009, it was announced that Patrick Huard had been cast to play the lead role in the film, Justin Chatwin, Paul Doucet, Sarah Mutch, Raymond Bouchard, François Létourneau and Geneviève Brouillette being also cast in supporting roles, with Daniel Roby directing from a screenplay by Steve Galluccio. Principal photography took place between June 9, 2009, and August 8, 2009, in Montreal. Some scenes of the film were in fact shot inside, outside and in the surroundings of the building which had housed the Limelight_(Montreal), at 1258 Stanley Street. It now houses the premium strip club "Chez Parée" and the dance club "La Boom".

== Language ==
Like the 2006 film Bon Cop, Bad Cop, the film features dialogue in both English and French. For French audiences the English dialogue is subtitled, while for English audiences the French dialogue is subtitled.

The film has faced some controversy for its mixture of languages, with one journalist for La Presse accusing it of being essentially an English film with only token dialogue in French, rather than a truly bilingual film.

== Release ==
Funkytown opened in a limited release in Canada on March 4, 2011. In the United States, the film was released straight-to-DVD on October 2, 2012.
