= Đặng Thân =

Vietnamese poet and writer

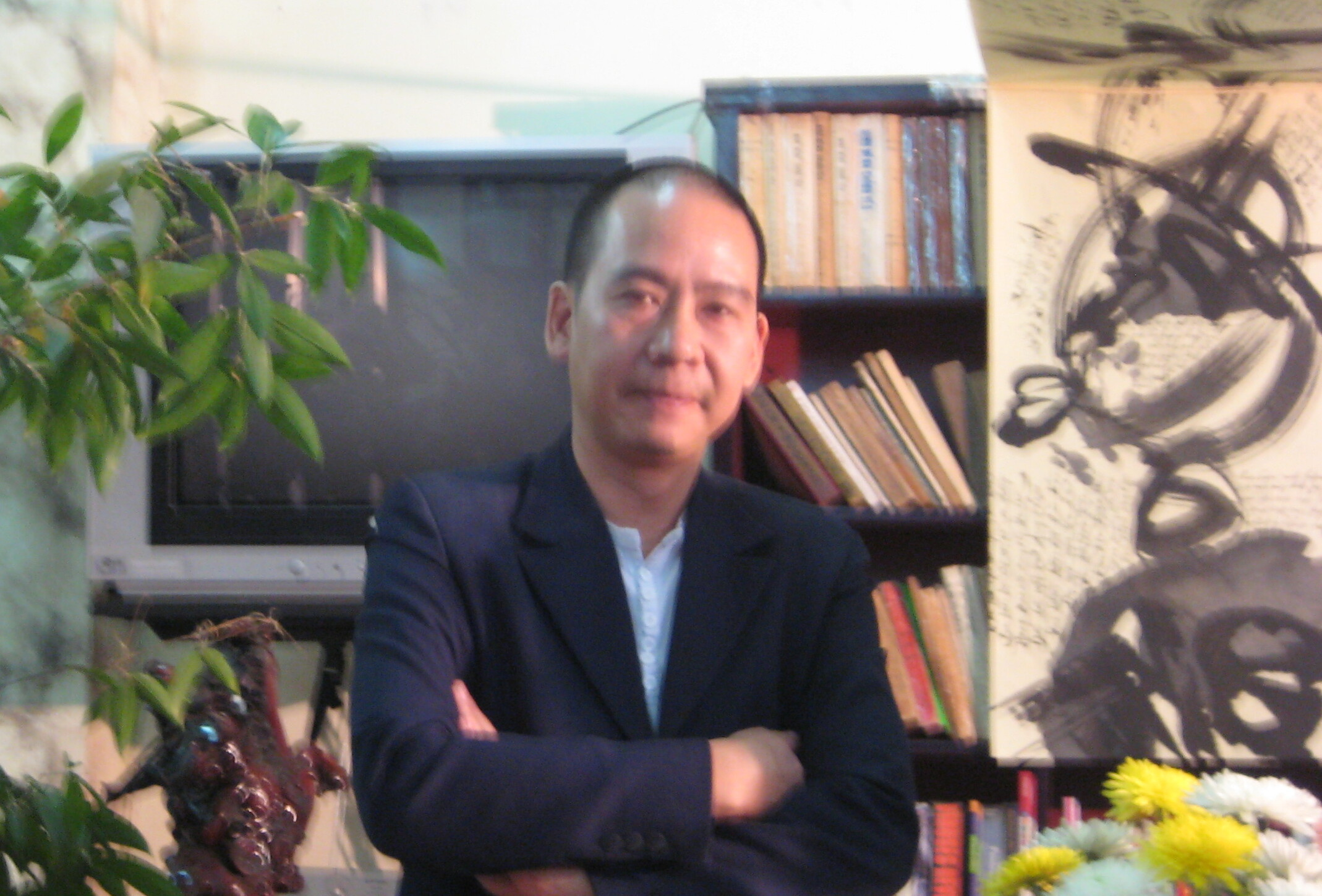
- Born: 1964 (age 61–62)
- Occupations: Writer and poet
- Writing career
- Pen name: Đặng Thân
- Period: 2004–present
- Notable works: MaNet (CyberGhost), short stories collection, Hanoi 2008; Tiền vệ phụ âm thư, avant-garde calligraphic alliteration, Hanoi 2009; 3.3.3.9 [những mảnh hồn trần] (3.3.3.9 [Fragments of Earthy/Naked Souls]), a novel, Hanoi 2011; Dị-nghị-luận đồng-chân-dung (Hetero-reasonings & Homo-portraits), essays selection, Hanoi 2013; Không Hay (No Sense), poetry, Hanoi 2014; OM [Other Moments], poetry - USA 2019, Brazil 2021, Italy 2023; Phạc Nhiên Đy, philosophical essays, 2020

Đặng Thân (Note: In this Vietnamese name, the surname is Đặng, but is often simplified to Dang in English-language text. In accordance with Vietnamese custom, this person should be referred to by the given name, Thân.) is a Pushcart Prize-nominated bilingual poet, fiction writer, essayist and critic, based in Vietnam. There he is regarded "the typical figure of Post-Doi Moi Literature", and considered "the best humourist ever" and even an "awesomely brilliant genius". Unfortunately, it was repeatedly said that leading governmental departments in Vietnam instructed the "state-controlled" literary circle that his works were "harmful". From 2008 up to 2011 and from 2014 up to present, all publishing houses there had not been allowed to print any book of his for no righteous reasons, and official state-run newspapers had been ordered to leave him in the dark.

In the feature article, "Demilitarized Zone: Report From Literary Vietnam", the New York-based Poets & Writers wrote of Thân: "In the literary circles he runs in, Dang is praised for his idiosyncratic prose and rebellious style."

Đặng Thân's officially-published works in various genres, especially novels, have been widely recognised and created the utmost important turning-point in writing style of Vietnamese literature. He is the representative of a completely-new way of discourse with alternative lexical resources in preference of connotation rather than the commonly-old usage of denotation. He pioneers Vietnamese alliteration poetry and a new style named phac-nhien.

Đặng Thân's poetry has been translated into many other foreign languages such as Chinese, French, Italian, Portuguese, German, Spanish, Bengali, Serbian, Catalan and Greek. So far his poetry has garnered prestigious international prizes: 2020 Naji Naaman Literary Prize, Premio Il Meleto di Guido Gozzano 2020, Panorama Global Award, Cape Comorin Best Poetry Award and Premio I Colori del’Anima 2021. Also, he has become the first Vietnamese author having poems exhibited and housed at the World Museum of Poetry in Piacenza, Italy. In October 2025, he was nominated for the Pushcart Prize.

== Biography ==
Born in 1964 in the city of Hạ Long in North Vietnam, Thân has taught American and English literature at several universities in Hanoi since 1990, and has also worked as a translator and interpreter. As of 2009, he is the Training Director at the IVN Institute for Research and Support of Education Development, as well as being in charge of Futurology Studies at the I-Ching Research & Development Center in Hanoi.

== Writing career ==
Thân is idiosyncratic and original in several genres, and he writes and publishes in English. In 2005, he received an award for a short story in the Poetry & Short Stories Contest on the Deep Love for 1000-year-old Thang Long.

In December 2008, he published his first short stories collection named Ma Net (Cyber Ghost), and it was received well by some and was controversial to others. The launch event for the book included hundreds of attendees.

In January 2009, a 23-metre-long scroll of calligraphy named Avant-garde Alliteration (by Trinh Tuan & Pham Long Ha) depicting his seven unique poetic works of alliteration came to the public and shocked the media.

In November 2011, after a long period of being secretly deterred by Vietnamese governmental publishing offices, his controversial "hetero-novel" 3.3.3.9 [những mảnh hồn trần] (3.3.3.9 [Fragments of Earthy/Naked Souls]) came to the public. On 7 January 2012, the French Institute of Hanoi (Institut Français de Hanoï – L'Espace – Centre Culturel Français) held a significant seminar on this book, and many Vietnamese critics and writers had gathered there to heatedly discuss its exceptional originality. Later on 18 October 2012, Goethe-Institut Hanoi organised a special event for this novel where many noted scholars and intellectuals praised and labelled it "the utmost important turning-point in writing style of Vietnamese literature," and suggested "it's worth to be Nobel-Prize nominated."

In January 2013, his collection of essays named Dị-nghị-luận Đồng-chân-dung (Hetero-reasonings & Homo-portraits) was published. It then considered “a very great event in the learning life of Vietnamese nation in the early twenty-first century” for its “idiosyncrasy in contents and writing styles.” It is the first time in the history of Vietnamese literature that a book conveys “the aesthetics of vulgarity” and “parody in literary criticism,” especially it brings about “the panoramic way of reading literature,” opening profound dimensions and multi-layers of all literary works and authors. Prof. Phong Lê wrote, "The recent introduction of Hetero-reasonings & homo-portraits by Đặng Thân, a newly-recognised literary critic, is a great, I must say, a notably remarkable event in the life of arts and studies of Vietnamese nation at the beginning of the 21st century. This book is, clearly, so original and distinctive in its contents and writing styles that we can harly see any single trait of them in those representative critics that formed the 20th century literary criticism. Personally, I do hope it will have a durable life in the high public acceptance, as strongly stated by the colleagues of mine."

In October 2014, one among many of his poetry anthologies was published in Vietnam, entitled Không Hay (No Sense). His poems appear very modern and philosophic; they have many semantic and stylistic layers which first reading tends not to reveal many. As a bilingual poet, his English poems are more evident and convincing while his Vietnamese verses are more for the linguists. He is a grand master of poetic language, and he pioneers Vietnamese alliteration poetry and a new style named phac-nhien that might partly mean rawly-natural. In September 2017, he was invited as an unheard-of international poet to Taipei Poetry Festival where he drew a large audience and evoked the media. The Taiwanese giant of contemporary literature, poet Xiang Yang wrote of Thân, "Đặng Thân is successful in using black humour language to deal with real problems. He's created his own poetic styles and captured the musicality in a natural language that proves himself to be an unsurpassable talent."

== Works ==
=== Short & Long Stories ===
- Ma Net / Cyber Ghost (2008, Literature Publishers, Vietnam)
- Other stories: Mẩu Thịt Thừa, Bài học tiếng Việt mới, Dutch Lady trong cung cấm Hoàng Thành

=== Novels ===
- 3.3.3.9 [những mảnh hồn trần] / 3.3.3.9 [Fragments of Earthly/Naked Souls] (2011, Hội Nhà Văn Publishers, Vietnam) – See: Chapter 1, Chapter 16, Chapter 29, Chapter 29, Chapter 33, Chapter 53 on Da Màu
- Những kênh bão người/Channels of the Homo Storms – See "Sử thi Ba Bựa/Tam Tài xứ Xích Đạo Thổ" (The Epic of Three Estates) on Da Màu
- Factum [a] Cave – See i, ii, iii on Tiền Vệ

=== Poetry ===
- Không hay / No Sense (2014, Hội Nhà Văn Publishers, Vietnam)
- OM [Other Moments] (2019, Shabda Press, USA)
- ÔM (2021, Sol Nas Folhas, Brazil)
- OM OgniMomento (2023, Bertoni Editore, Italy)
- Về trung / Come Middle (2024, Hội Nhà Văn Publishers, Vietnam)
- TỪ ĐIỂN THI X/X LOẠI [chúng sinh] – See: A, B1 & B2, C1 & C2, D, G1 & G2, J, L1 & L2, M, N, P1 & P2, S1 & S2, V... on Tiền Vệ
- Thơ Phụ Âm (Alliteration) on Tiền Vệ
- hài ku[l] on Da Màu
- Thơ Phạc Nhiên

=== Non-fiction ===
- Dị-nghị-luận Đồng-chân-dung / Hetero-Reasonings & Homo-Portraits (Hội Nhà Văn Publishers 2013): i.e. "Đoàn tầu 'Thống Nhất'(hay là 'quân tử dĩ hậu đức tải vật')" (on Đỗ Lai Thúy), "Nỗi đau [đáu] của trực giác(hay là tiếng gầm của sư tử)" (on Hoàng Ngọc Hiến), "Nhớ Phạm Công Thiện|Quên Henry Miller", James Joyce: vầng hồng từ đồng cỏ Ireland...
- Other writings: Những chuồ/trường đại học (ĐH) khủng vs. ĐH "R", Hà Nội 21 cửa ô – Hà Nội 5 cửa ô & Ô Cầu Giấy, Hoàng Kế Viêm và quan hệ với Lưu Vĩnh Phúc, Có một dòng sông "chết lâm sàng", Còn lũ nào ác hơn phát xít? (on Primo Levi), "Hành trình cỏ cây xuyên tâm l[iên/inh] (đọc dọc Thơ tuyển Mai Văn Phấn)"...

== Criticism ==
- "Dang Than's stories are most impressive and extremely well written." (James W. Borton - American senior writer and editor of Asia Times and The Washington Times)
- "Dang Than has the knack of taking simple, everyday events and actions and presenting them in a way that demonstrates his philosophical, sensitive and perceptive mindset. He reflects on some of the most fundamental and yet basic features of man's existence and relationships; he searches out and expresses their value, depth and importance to our lives in language that is, at the same time, easy to read and yet, deep and emotional ..." (Stavros Carapetis - Australian scholar/sculptor)
- "Having read the selection of short stories Ma Net (Cyber Ghost) I was exceptionally interested in the story "ma nhòa [net ii]" that is in proximity to the popular storytelling or 'linear narrative'. Its uniquely original feature lies in its "storytelling voice" which is a magical mix of ironic humour and raw anguish. Nonetheless, the author showed alternative styles of 'non-linear narrative' in most of the other stories..." (Hoàng Ngọc Hiến (2008). "Reading Ma Net")
- "If there needs to be a definition, I would like to name his writing style as 'ultra-realism'... This genre of literature reveals its ideology not on the 'realist' side of the plots but on the 'ultra' one. The destruction of the literary '3-D limit' creates an open sky of originality towards the infinite, inspiring a feeling like advancing from a shallow pond to an immense ocean. That can be true for both the writer and the reader as the former could find himself an outsider and the latter may discover himself the hero of a story. Đặng Thân's language can be seen flying with wings in stories like "'Hiếp'" and "'Yêu'", especially in the exceptionally well-written work of "ma net". He must be recognized as the first creator of 'ultra-realistic' characters in literature... This approach is that of an eagle. Flying over or overpassing the 'reality' may be the one and only way to catch the holistic view of it. In 'Nietzschean terms', one must get out of the 'mansty' so as to see man clearly and discerningly... Such a 'fresh' literature of sudden rises to 'heaven' and amazing falls to 'hell' just emerges from his own way of 'wording' and 'storytelling voicing'... An eagle, isn't he?"
- "Regarding one's self as another's, especially showing a serious but humorous and tolerant attitude toward oneself, is the first step to enlightenment."
- "As compared to some other contemporary writers worth to be read, Dang Than belongs to a more complicated category. In terms of fiction creative writing techniques, he has found himself a very idiosyncratic way of expression with a lengthy and press-like narrative. If you cannot realise an awesomely brilliant genius in his intermingled appraisals that seem accidental at times, you may be supposed that he is writing newspaper articles or, compiling materials. Consequently, some people might stop reading his while others cannot go with the track or understand his works at all. There should be one way to “decode” him: you can first underline sentences and paragraphs you really like, then you can gradually perceive what this writer of immense genius with enormous ideas and materials really wants. Dang Than needs a pretty number of concubines who would rearrange his belongings and clean up all the trash he leaves behind in the rooms he sleeps each night. I am of the view that he is looking for ways to rearrange himself, forming a prestigious literary estate. Certainly, he cannot leave out this mammoth “carpeting” style as he is uniquely brilliant and overwhelmed in so many ideas he makes, connects or interrelates. He is digesting both himself and life around him."
- “The author shows an approach that originates from both internal and external sides, both scientific and artistic perspectives, with rich knowledge emerging from different cultures together with idiosyncratic criticisms; however, his is not far from traditional realms. Furthermore, his points of view towards contemporary poets and writers are not only original but also so youthful.” (Critic Prof.PhD Trần Ngọc Vương)
- "When reading Đặng Thân's, one needs to give up the conformist-like practice of abiding to the 'common sense' language. An ardent reader must penetrate into his language’s crust at all costs so as to hit its very core of perfection or, 'pāramitā'.” (Vietnamese Poet Nguyễn Bảo Chân)
- “Đặng Thân is a hetero-subject that goes beyond those ones of trauma [in totalitarian countries]. Đặng Thân is a hetero-universe that is away from worlds of joys and sorrows. Đặng Thân is a hetero-voice that cannot be mixed-up with the crowd’s identically serial utterances.” (Critic Prof.PhD La Khắc Hòa [Lã Nguyên])
- "Đặng Thân is successful in using black humour language to deal with real problems. He's created his own poetic styles and captured the musicality in a natural language that proves himself to be an unsurpassable talent." (Taiwanese poet Xiang Yang)

== Externaml links ==
- Khoan cắt bê tông, an anthology of avant-garde poetry by 23 authors (Vietnam: Giấy Vụn Publishers, Oct 2005).
- Đặng Thân in Tác Giả Việt Nam (Vietnamese Authors), compiled by Lê Bảo Hoàng (Canada: Nhân Ảnh Press, 2006).
- Truyện ngắn trên trang Web, Văn nghệ sông Cửu Long (Vietnam: Văn Học Publishing House, 2006).
- Tuyển tập thơ Tân hình thức (Blank Verse, An Anthology of Vietnamese New Formalism Poetry), edited by Khế Iêm, translated by Joseph Đỗ Vinh (USA: Tân Hình Thức Publishing Club, 2006).
- Tuyển tập Tiền Vệ I, edited by Nguyễn Hưng Quốc & Hoàng Ngọc-Tuấn (Australia: Tiền Vệ, 2007).
- "Tọa đàm văn nghệ ở... gốc cây Ưu Bà" by Phạm Lưu Vũ on talawas.
- Có jì dùng jì – có nấy dùng nấy, an anthology of avant-garde poetry by 47 authors (Vietnam: Giấy Vụn Publishers, Oct 2007).
