= NATO Day =

Annual observance commemorating the founding of NATO

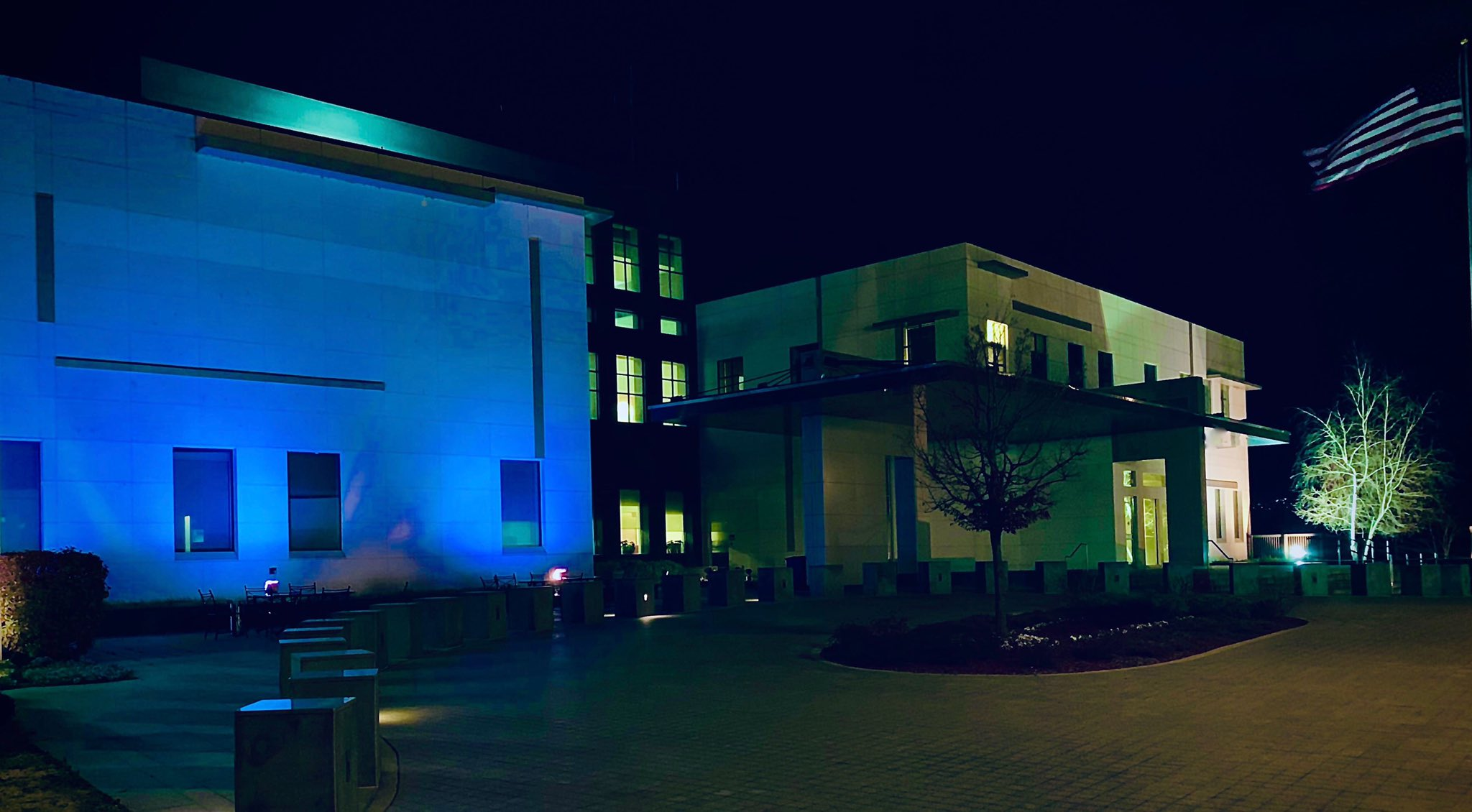
- U.S. Embassy in Skopje lit blue for 2020 NATO Day
- Observed by: North Macedonia, Romania, Lithuania
- Date: 4 April
- Next time: 4 April 2026
- Frequency: Annual

The NATO Day is a day commemorating the founding of NATO by the signing of the North Atlantic Treaty on 4 April 1949. It is celebrated in all Allied countries, including, but not limited to, North Macedonia and marked on the first Sunday of April in Romania (where the holiday is known as Ziua NATO). However, in Lithuania it is celebrated on 29 March, in honor of its accession to NATO in 2004.
