= Steve Galluccio =

Canadian screenwriter and playwright

- Born: October 9, 1960 (age 65); Montreal, Quebec
- Education: Concordia University
- Occupations: playwright, screenwriter
- Spouse: Yves Dionne (? - 2020)
- Writing career
- Language: English, Français, Italiano
- Period: 1990s-present
- Notable works: Mambo Italiano, Funkytown

Steve Galluccio (born October 9, 1960) is a Canadian screenwriter and playwright, most noted for his play Mambo Italiano and its feature film adaptation Mambo Italiano.

== Background ==
Born and raised in Montreal, Quebec to immigrant parents from Italy, Galluccio studied translation at Concordia University. His first theatrical play, My Mom Was on the Radio, premiered at the Quebec Drama Festival in 1990. He followed up with a number of plays on the fringe festival circuit, including She's the Queen, Sex, Lies and Brian Mulroney, The Brady Bunch: The Hidden Episode, Peter 'n Paul Get Mary'd, Sexual Success in Montreal, Batman and Robin: The Untold Story and What's Alice Doing in the Freezer?

== Mambo Italiano ==
In the late 1990s Galluccio wrote Mambo Italiano, a semi-autobiographical comedy about a young man in Montreal who comes out as gay to his Italian-Canadian family. Although the play was originally written in English, a French translation by Michel Tremblay was produced by Montreal's Théâtre Jean-Duceppe in 2000, in advance of its English premiere at Centaur Theatre in 2001. The play was one of the most successful and popular productions in the history of both theatre companies, with the runs repeatedly extended due to its popularity; a production was also mounted at the Elgin Theatre in Toronto in 2003.

By 2002, the film adaptation was in the works; directed by Émile Gaudreault, the film premiered in 2003 in both English and French versions. The film was acted primarily in English and then dubbed into French; as most of its cast were fluently bilingual residents of Montreal, most actors were able to dub their own parts. It went on to be one of the most internationally successful films in Canadian film history, and the theatrical version became one of the most widely produced Canadian plays of the 21st century.

== Later work ==
His subsequent credits include the films Surviving My Mother (Comment survivre à sa mère), Funkytown, and Little Italy, the television series Ciao Bella, and the theatrical plays In Piazza San Domenico and The St. Leonard Chronicles.

He has also been involved in the writing and composition of music for his film soundtracks. He received two Genie Award nominations for Best Original Song, for Mambo Italiano's "Montréal Italiano" at the 24th Genie Awards in 2004, and for Funkytown's "Waiting for Your Touch" at the 32nd Genie Awards in 2012.

In 2012 he published Montréal à la Galluccio, a tourist guide to the city's cafés, restaurants, bars and other cultural amenities, in collaboration with photographer Mathieu Dupuis.

His theatrical play At the Beginning of Time received an online reading from Centaur Theatre in 2020. The premiere for "At the Beginning of Time" opens at Centaur Theatre directed by renowned Canadian director Peter Hinton-Davis. The show features set designed by Michael Gianfrancesco with paintings by Montreal artist Daniel Barkley

In 2021 he participated in translating the scripts for Entre deux draps, a Quebec television comedy series, into English for the adaptation Pillow Talk.

== Personal life ==
Galluccio is openly gay. His husband, Yves Dionne, died of Alzheimer's disease in 2020, and the challenges of their relationship after his diagnosis form part of the basis for At the Beginning of Time.
