= Edmond Hébert =

French geologist

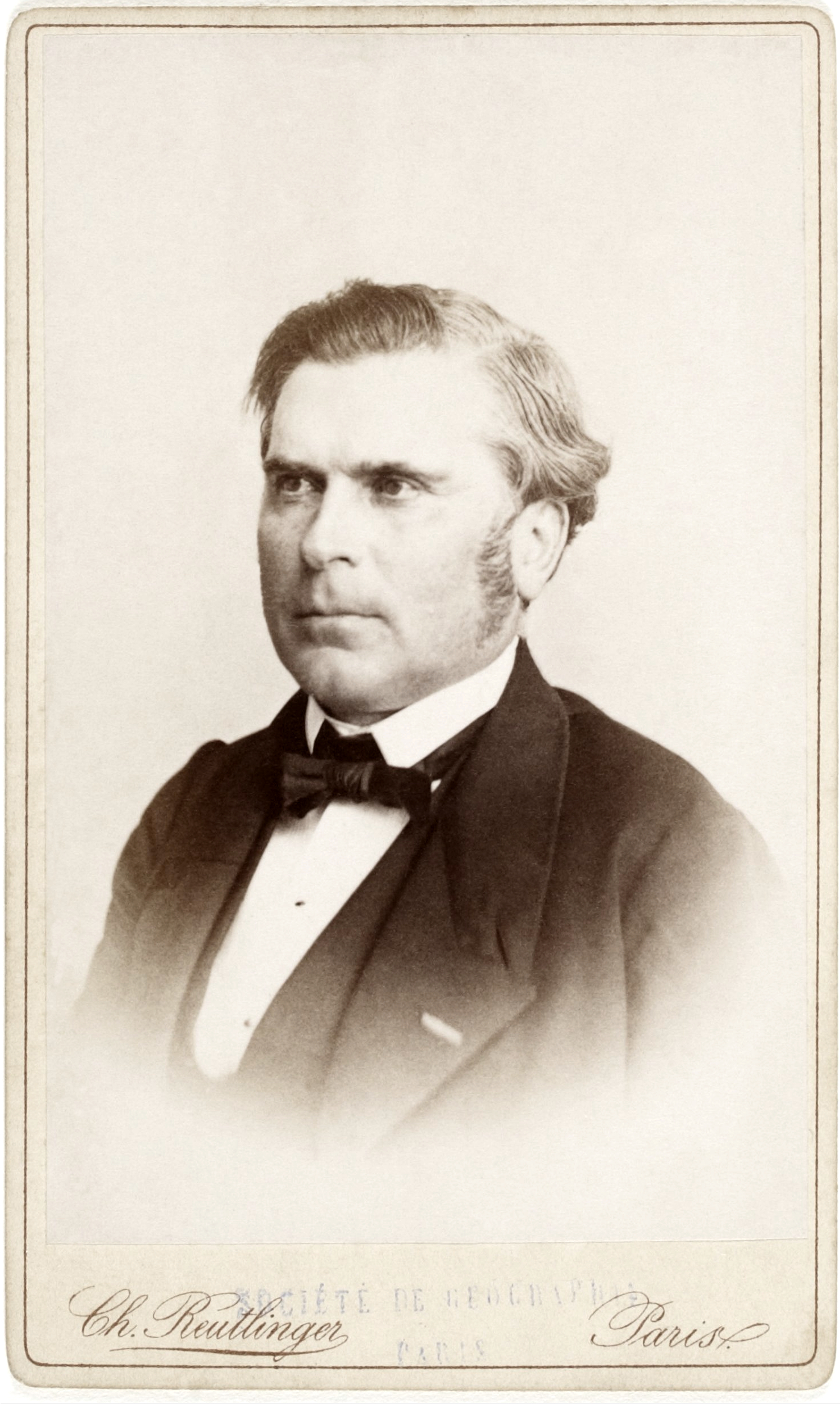
- Born: 12 June 1812; Villefargau, France
- Died: 4 April 1890 (aged 77); Paris, France
- Citizenship: France
- Scientific career
- Fields: Geology
- Thesis: Recherches sur le terrain jurassique dans le bassin de Paris (1857)

Edmond Hébert (12 June 1812 – 4 April 1890), French geologist, was born at Villefargau, Yonne.

He was educated at the College de Meaux, Auxerre, and at the École Normale in Paris. In 1836 he became professor at Meaux, in 1838 demonstrator in chemistry and physics at the École Normale, and in 1841 sub-director of studies at that school and lecturer on geology. In 1857 the degree of D. es Sc. was conferred upon him, and he was appointed professor of geology at the Sorbonne.

There he was eminently successful as a teacher, and worked with great zeal in the field, adding much to the knowledge of the Jurassic and older strata. He devoted, however, special attention to the subdivisions of the Cretaceous and Tertiary formations in France, and to their correlation with the strata in England and in southern Europe.

To him we owe the first definite arrangement of the Chalk into palaeontological zones (see "Table" in Geol. Hag., 1869, p. 200). During his later years he was regarded as the leading geologist in France.

He was elected a member of the Académie des sciences in 1877, Commander of the Legion of Honour in 1885, and he was three times president of the Geological Society of France. He died in Paris on 4 April 1890.
