= Battle of Narmada =

618 battle between the Chalukyas and Pushyabhutis

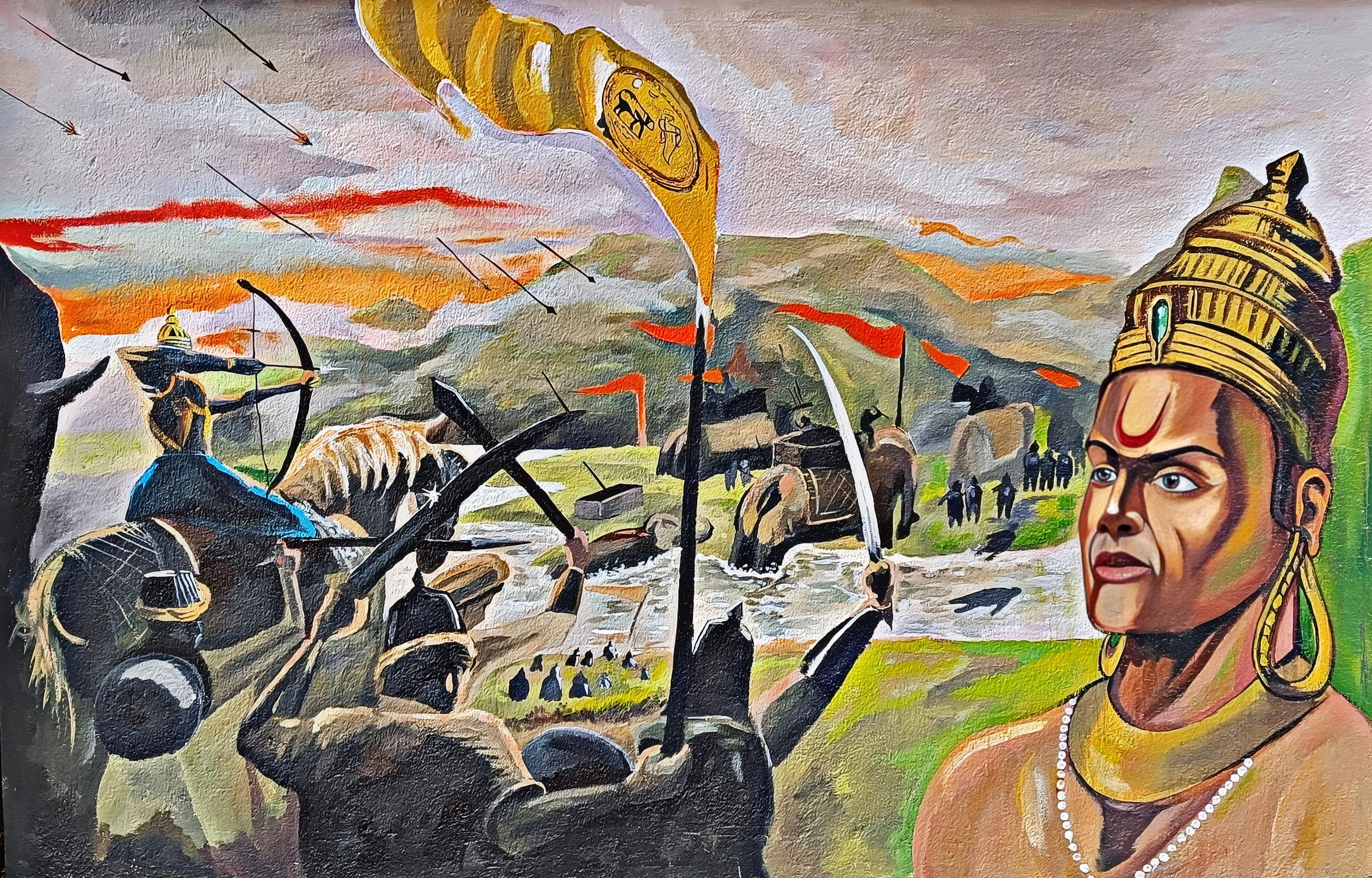
- Modern painting depicting the Battle of Narmada in Bengaluru
Date	Sometime between October 618 and February 619
Location	Narmada
Result	Chalukyan victory
Territorial changes	Pulakeshin claimed the northernmost part of Deccan till the river Narmada

Belligerents
Chalukya dynasty	Pushyabhuti dynasty

Commanders and leaders
Pulakeshin II	Harshavardhana

Strength
Unknown	Unknown

The Battle of Narmada (Kannada: ನರ್ಮದೆ ಕದನ) was fought between king Pulakeshin II of Chalukya dynasty and king Harshavardhana of Pushyabhuti dynasty on the banks of the river Narmada, India in the winter of 618–19. The battle resulted in the great victory of Pulakeshin II and the retreat of Harsha and his forces, halting northern expansion into Deccan.

== Battle ==
The Aihole inscription of Pulakeshin highlights the Harsha (mirth) of Harsha melted away by fear, as his elephants fell in the battle. The only other inscription from his reign that mentions this battle is the Bijapur-Mumbai inscription.

The Rashtrakutas, who ultimately overthrew the Chalukyas several years after Pulakeshin's death, also highlights that they defeated the dynasty that claimed victory over Harshavardhana, thus indirectly confirming Pulakeshin's achievement.

The Aihole inscription poetically states that Pulakeshin's elephants had to avoid the neighborhood of the Vindhya mountains beside the Narmada River, because they "by their bulk, rivaled the mountains". Historian K. A. Nilakanta Sastri interprets to mean that Pulakeshin "did not send his elephant forces into the difficult Vindhya terrain", and guarded the passes with infantry. According to Shreenand L. Bapat and Pradeep S. Sohoni, the inscription suggests that Pulakeshin's army subsequently tried to cross the Vindhyas, in a bid to invade Harsha's kingdom, but was unsuccessful, which may explain why only two inscriptions from Pulakeshin's reign mention his conflict with Harsha.

== Aftermath ==
The title of Paramesvara, i.e., ‘the great lord or the lord of lords’, was adopted by Pulakesin II after defeating Harshavardhana of the North. The Rashtrakuta records also narrate that they defeated the army of Vallabha, or the Karnata Bala, which was renowned for its victories over the Pallavas, Pandyas, Cholas, Harshavardhana(Pushyabhuti) and Vajrata, thus indirectly confirming the claim of the Chalukyan inscriptions defeating Harsha

== In popular culture ==
Several Kannadiga communities celebrate this victory as a great event of overthrowing the "suzerainty of the North". Current Chief Minister of Karnataka Siddaramaiah has also mentioned it to be a powerful victory and deriding for the ‘northern imports’ are among attempts to brand himself as a strong southern satrap, following the 7th-century Chalukya king Pulakeshin. Kannada actor Dhananjaya also said he is not interested in statues but people should read about Pulikeshi II and king Pulakeshin II is one of the inspirations for him and for the Kannadiga community

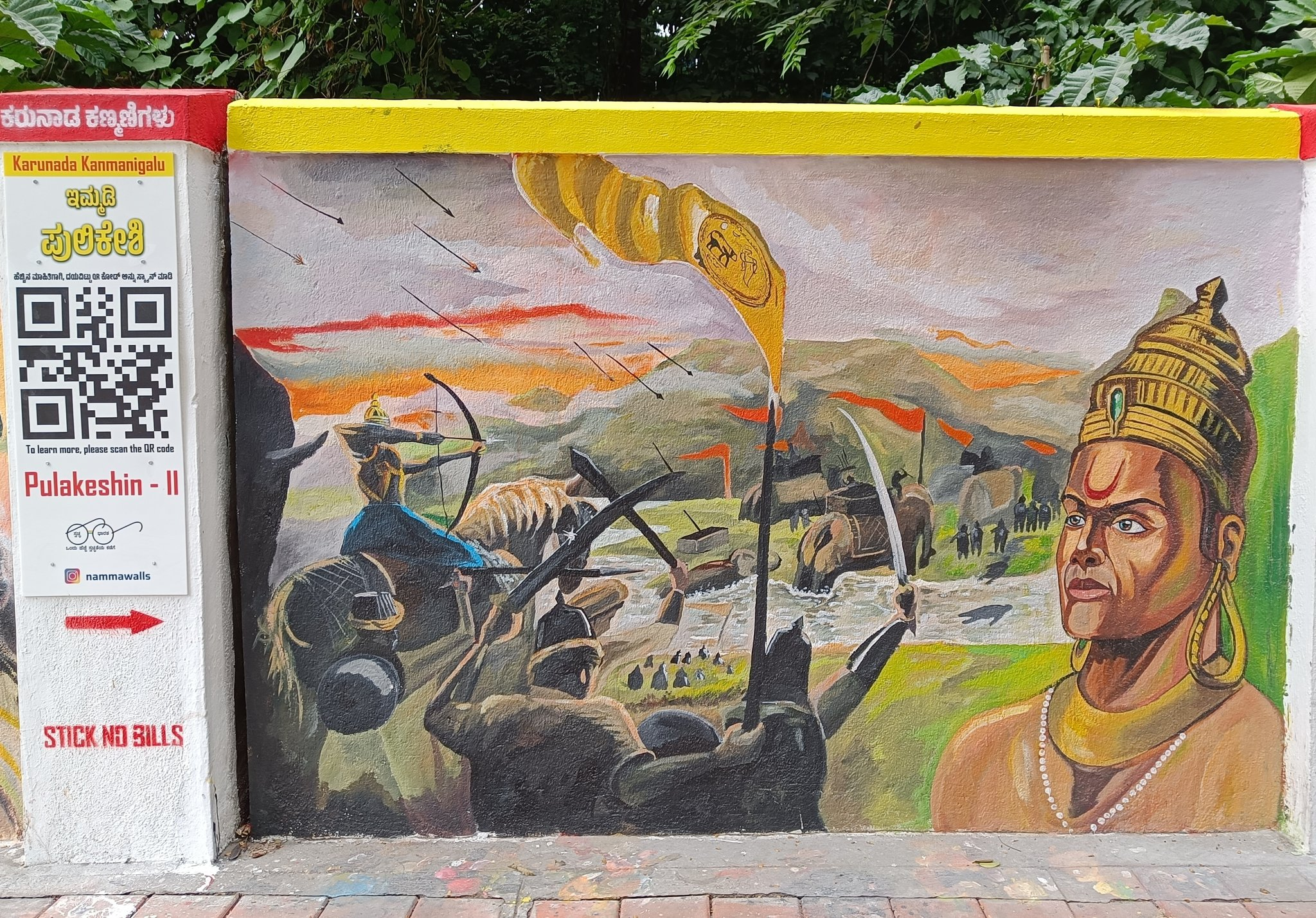
Painting of Pulakeshin in Karnataka capital Bengaluru

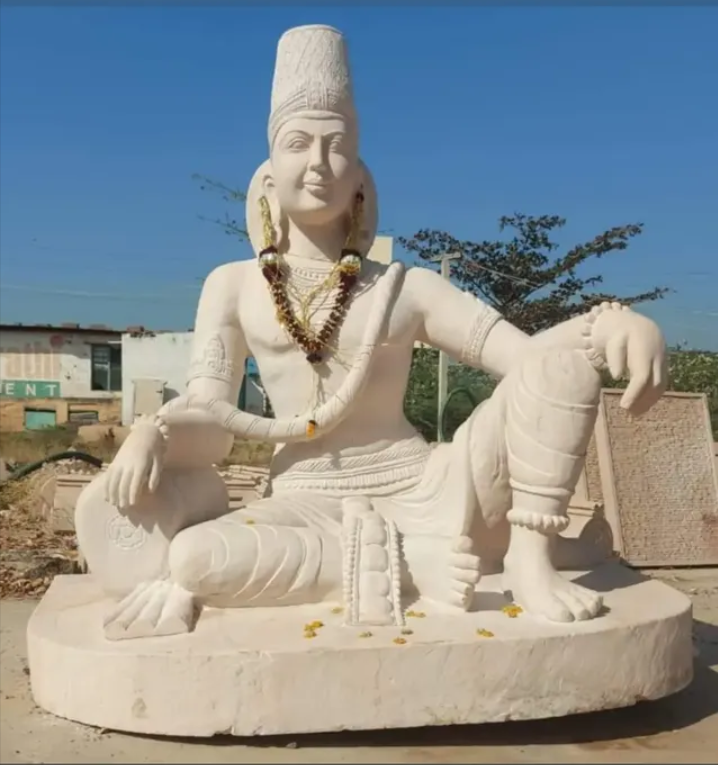
Statue of Pulakeshin in Badami (former Chalukyan capital)
