= John the Fearless (film) =

1984 Belgian animated film

- Directed by: Jef Cassiers
- Screenplay by: Jef Cassiers
- Produced by: Hilda Verboven
- Starring: Jan Decleir; Jef Burm
- Edited by: Renaat Rombouts
- Music by: Alain Pierre
- Production company: Belgische Radio en Televisie (BRT)
- Distributed by: Belga Films
- Release date: 1984 (in Belgium)
- Running time: 78 minutes
- Country: Belgium
- Language: Dutch

John the Fearless (Dutch: Jan zonder vrees) is a 1984 animated Belgian film. It is notable for being the first feature-length animated film produced in Flanders in its entirety. It is based on a novel by Constant de Kinder and features voice work by Belgian character actor Jan Decleir. An English dubbed version of the film was produced by Canadian animation studio Cinar Films and was released on video in 1989 by Just For Kids Video.

== Plot ==
The story begins in Antwerp, Belgium, in the year 1410 when John resigns his job as a sailor and goes back home to his grandmother. After seeing all of the burglars in town, he takes it upon himself to rid the town of all evildoers. After he has become the word around town, he lets everyone in the town know that he has no fear. His cousin, in jealousy of John's newfound fame decides to disprove this statement, by showing up at the local graveyard dressed as a ghost. John, annoyed with the ghost's presence, accidentally kills his cousin. Realizing his mistake, he reports it, only to be arrested and sentenced to prison. However, he easily escapes the prison guards and goes about his ways. He ends up soon after in the countryside, to find a servant being beaten by his master. After showing the boss the error of his ways, the boss recognizes his goodheartedness and sends him on a quest to destroy a shape shifting evil water demon called Kludde, with the servant as his sidekick. John, true to his claim of having "no fear" begins his quest with good spirits. After accomplishing numerous brave deeds, he is knighted by the historical John the Fearless.

== English Cast ==
- Michael Rudder as John
- Rob Roy as Dokus
- Linda O'Dwyer
- Dean Hagopian
- Terrence Labrosse - Mob Member
- Kelly Ricard
- Mark Berman
- Walter Massey
- Bronwen Mantel
- Arthur Grosser
- Kathleen Fee
- Dave Patrick
- A. J. Henderson - Mob Member
- Steve Michaels
- Ian Finlay
- Jane Woods
- Liz MacRae
- Harry Hill
- Richard M. Dumont
- Gayle Garfinkle
