= Richard M. Dumont =

Canadian voice actor, director

Richard M. Dumont (born 23 February 1959 in Toronto, Ontario) is a Canadian voice actor, writer and director who has worked in both Canada and the United States.

Dumont is known for playing Sardo, who owned a magic shop called Sardo's Magic Mansion, in many episodes of the Canadian-American horror fantasy anthology television series for Nickelodeon, Are You Afraid of the Dark?

Dumont studied at the University of California, Los Angeles, later studying theatre-acting at Ryerson Theatre School before joining The Second City.

== Filmography ==
=== Voice Work ===
==== Animation ====
- 50/50 Heroes – Mr. Brick
- The Adventures of Huckleberry Finn – Additional Voices
- The Adventures of the Little Koala – Weather, Maki-Maki
- Animal Crackers – Additional Voices
- The Animal Train – Charlie
- Around the World in 80 Dreams – Additional Voices
- Arthur – Dr. Hirsch, Al
- Audrey's Shelter
- Beyblade – Crusher, Director, Crowd Member A
- Billy and Buddy – Dad
- Bob in a Bottle – Mr. Carter
- Bobobobs – A.D.
- Bumpety Boo – Additional Voices
- A Bunch of Munsch – Various
- Calimero – Additional Voices
- Cat Tales – Additional Voices
- Charlie Strap and Froggy Ball Flying High – Froggy Ball
- Christopher Columbus – Additional Voices
- Cosmic Cowboys – Additional Voices
- The Country Mouse and the City Mouse Adventures – Additional Voices
- Creepschool – Principal Malcolm
- C.L.Y.D.E. – Additional Voices
- David Copperfield – Mr. Grimby
- Diplodos – Additional Voices
- Dragon Hunters – Additional Voices
- Edmond Was a Donkey – Edmond's Boss
- Favorite Songs/The Real Story of... – Additional Voices
- Felix and the Treasure of Morgäa (Félix et le trésor de Morgäa)
- Flatmania – Additional Voices
- For Better or For Worse – Additional Voices
- Fred's Head – Theo Sturgeon
- Gawayn – Rex
- Gofrette – Hamlet
- Gulliver's Travels – Additional Voices
- How the Toys Saved Christmas – Skipper, Conductor
- Iron Nose: The Mysterious Knight – Iron Nose, Little Bro
- Jim Button and Luke the Engine Driver – Additional Voices
- Jungle Tales – Additional Voices
- Katak: The Brave Beluga
- The Kids from Room 402 – Mr. Besser
- The Legend of the North Wind – Martin
- The Legend of White Fang – Additional Voices
- The Little Flying Bears – Additional Voices
- The Little Lulu Show – Additional Voices
- The Lost World – Additional Voices
- Lucky Luke – Additional Voices
- Madeline – Additional Voices
- The Magical Adventures of Quasimodo – Additional Voices
- Marsupilami – Marsupilami, Additional Voices
- Maya the Bee – Willi
- Mega Babies – Announcer
- Merry Christmas Little Moonky – Weasel
- A Miss Mallard Mystery – Additional Voices
- Mona the Vampire – Officer Halcroft (2003)
- Mrs. Pepper Pot – Additional Voices
- The Mysterious Cities of Gold – Menator
- My Friend Marsupilami – Marsupilami
- Night Hood – Grognard
- Papa Beaver's Storytime – Additional Voices
- Patrol 03 – Additional Voices
- Pinocchio – Punch
- Pirate Family – Victor Maclimpet
- Princess Sissi – Additional Voices
- Prudence Gumshoe – Crook
- The Real Story of Baa Baa Black Sheep – Additional Voices
- The Real Story of O Christmas Tree – Polar Bear
- Ripley's Believe It or Not – Additional Voices
- Rotten Ralph – TV Announcer, Manfred Moon, Bongo Bob, Buddy, Mailman
- Saban's Adventures of Peter Pan – Additional Voices
- Saban's Adventures of Pinocchio – Additional Voices
- Saban's Adventures of the Little Mermaid – Prince Lothar
- Sagwa, the Chinese Siamese Cat – Additional Voices
- Samurai Pizza Cats – Bat Cat, Children, Cannonball Battery
- Sandokan – Additional Voices
- Sea Dogs
- The Secret World of Santa Claus – Additional Voices
- Shaolin Wuzang – Tang
- Sharky and George – Additional Voices
- Simon in the Land of Chalk Drawings – Additional Voices
- The Smoggies – Cool
- Snailympics – Announcer
- Spirou – Additional Voices
- Three Little Ghosts – Additional Voices
- Tripping the Rift – Additional Voices
- Troll: The Tale of a Tail King Grom, Additional Voices
- Tripping the Rift: The Movie – Additional Voices
- The True Story of Puss 'n Boots – Puss
- Trulli Tales - Copperpot
- Ulysses 31 – Chronos
- The What-a-Cartoon! Show – Captain Buzz Cheeply (The Adventures of Captain Buzz Cheeply in A Clean Getaway)
- The Wonderful Wizard of Oz – Scarecrow
- The World of David the Gnome – King
- Wunschpunsch – Additional Voices
- Young Robin Hood – Additional Voices

==== Puppetry ====
- Wimzie's House – Santa Claus, Announcer

=== Live-Action ===
==== TV series ====
- Are You Afraid of the Dark? (1992-1996) – Sardo
- The Foundation – Narrator

==== Film ====
- A Dennis The Menace Christmas – Principal Purdy
- The Kiss – Abe
- Million Dollar Babies – Porcetta
- Beethoven's Treasure

=== Voice Director ===
==== Animation ====
- Anpanman
- April and the Extraordinary World
- The Babaloos
- The Bellflower Bunnies
- A Bunch of Munsch
- Calimero
- Cat Tales
- Charlie Strap and Froggy Ball Flying High
- Chip and Charlie
- Cosmic Cowboys
- Favorite Songs
- Gawayan
- Gawain 2
- Go Hugo Go
- How the Toys Saved Christmas
- Hugo The Movie Star
- Iron Nose: The Mysterious Knight
- Ivanhoe: The King's Knight
- The Legend of White Fang
- Link
- The Little Lulu Show
- The Little Twins
- Merry Christmas Little Moonky
- Milo
- Miffy
- The Mysteries of Alfred Hedgehog
- Night Hood
- Papa Beaver's Storytime
- Patrol 03
- Pirate Family
- Potatoes and Dragons
- Robinson Sucroe
- Rotten Ralph
- Sandokan
- Saving Me
- Shaolin Wuzang
- Simba the King Lion
- Snailympics
- Snowtime!
- The True Story of Puss 'n Boots
- Winx Club

==== Puppetry ====
- Anna Banana
- The Big Garage
- Kitty Cats
- Wimzie's House

==== Live-Action ====
- The Adventures of Grady Greenspace

==== Video games ====
- Assassin's Creed Rogue – Christopher Gist
- Assassin's Creed: Unity
- Assassin's Creed: Syndicate
- Avatar: The Game
- Evolution Worlds
- Prince of Persia: Warrior Within – Dahaka
- Splinter Cell
- Splinter Cell: Blacklist
- Splinter Cell: Chaos Theory
- Splinter Cell: Pandora Tomorrow
- Your Shape

=== Writer ===
- Deadly Hope – Lifetime/Incendo Films
- Radio Silence – Lifetime/Incendo Films

==== Animation ====
- Bob in a Bottle
- Calimero
- Miffy
- Papa Beaver's Storytime
- Robinson Sucroe
- Three Little Ghosts
- Zoe and Charlie

==== Puppetry ====
- Kitty Cats
