= The Little Flying Bears =

Canadian/Croatian animated television series

- Written by: Jean-Pierre Liccioni
- Starring: Sonja Ball; Daniel Brochu; Teddy Lee Dillon; Richard Dumont; Kathleen Fee; Ian Finlay; Jessalyn Gilsig; Dean Hagopian; A.J. Henderson; Arthur Holden; Gary Jewell; Rick Jones; Pauline Little; Jeff Lumby; Walter Massey; Michael O'Reilly; Patricia Rodriguez; Michael Rudder; Terrence Scammell; Jane Woods; Thor Bishopric
- Countries of origin: Canada; Croatia
- Original language: English
- No. of episodes: 39

Production
- Producers: CinéGroupe; Zagreb Film
- Running time: 30 minutes
- Production companies: CinéGroupe; Zagreb Film

Original release
- Network: Family Channel
- Release: September 2, 1990 – June 30, 1991

The Little Flying Bears (Croatian: Mali leteći medvjedi) is an animated television series produced by CinéGroupe and Zagreb Film. It was a Canadian production which originally aired in 1990.

This cartoon helps children realize the importance of protecting the environment. The series shows the harmful effects of pollution and fires as well as the important role of the ecosystem.

== Plot ==
The series focuses on a rare species of little bears with butterfly-like wings that live in the magical forest in a utopian cooperative community. The little flying bears together with their friends, took on themselves the task to defend their forest from pollution, but their efforts, very often, are disturbed by two weasels, Skulk and Sammy, who strive to pollute the forest. Every so often the weasels receive help from Slink the snake. The three always strive to find new ways to disturb the harmony of the forest but their plans are destroyed always by the bears. The bears are always attentive to the advice of the old bear, Plato (who is too old to fly) and his friend Ozzy the owl.

== Characters ==
=== Protagonists ===
- Plato (voiced by Walter Massey) – A wise old grey male flying bear which serves as the head of the flying bear community and is the grandfather of all its bear cubs. Plato has no wings any more and thus is incapable of flight. He is also much larger than the younger flying bears, roughly the size of a human being. The younger bears respect him for his wisdom and follow his advice. He is named after the Greek Philosopher of the same name.
- Walt (voiced by Arthur Holden) – A young male blue flying bear cub with lighter blue hair and orange wings. He is Tina's boyfriend and is possibly the brother of Jason and Josh, but this is not confirmed. He and Tina are the main protagonists of the series and are the bravest members of the flying bear community.
- Tina (voiced by Jessalyn Gilsig) – A young female orange flying bear cub with a blonde ponytail and blue wings, who wears a green necklace and big green flower on the top of her head. She is Walt's girlfriend and is possibly the sister of Lotus and Jasmine, but this is not confirmed. She and Walt are the main protagonists of the series and are the bravest members of the flying bear community.
- Josh (voiced by Teddy Lee Dillon) – A young male brown flying bear cub with brown hair and purple wings. He is Jasmine's boyfriend and the fraternal twin brother of Jason. He is one of the shyest members of the flying bear community.
- Jasmine (voiced by Pauline Little) – A young female pink flying bear cub with orange wings who wears a blue necklace and blue flower crown. She is Josh's girlfriend and the identical twin sister of Lotus. She is short-tempered, but not as brave as Walt and Tina.
- Lotus (voiced by Pauline Little): A young female pink flying bear cub with orange wings, who wears a blue necklace and green flower crown. Lotus is Jasmine's identical twin sister, and is possibly Jason's girlfriend, but this is not confirmed. She is quite timid, compared to the other flying bears.
- Jason (voiced by Jeff Lumby & Ian Finlay): A young male red flying bear cub with blonde hair and green wings. He is Josh's fraternal twin brother, and possible, but not confirmed, Lotus's boyfriend. He works in the local canteen and is short-tempered, but not as brave as Walt and Tina.
- Ozzy (voiced by Rick Jones) – An impatient and nervous male brown owl, he is a friend of the bears. He usually wears a red hat.
- Markus (voiced by Thor Bishopric) – A young male red frog who is a friend of the bears.
- Ariana – A young female purple spider with visible ears who wears a green bow on her head.
- Rodney – A male brown beaver.
- Frandisema (voiced by Sonja Ball) – A female green frog who wears a pink bonnet.
- Sidney – A male white snowy owl who lives in the mountains.

Other notable inhabitants of the forest include: blue rabbits, orange squirrels, pink bobcats or lynxes, raccoons, skunks and blue and green birds (both males and females of all these species are shown, but most of them remain unnamed).

=== Antagonists ===
- Skulk (voiced by Terrence Scammell) – An anthropomorphic weasel who wears a blue vest and an earring. The main antagonist of the series, Skulk is The Little Flying Bears' worst enemy and frenemy. He yearns for "manimal" (human) culture and brings many side effects to the forest.
- Sammy (voiced by A.J. Henderson) – An anthropomorphic and dim-witted weasel who wears a green shirt with a belt strapped to his waist and a football helmet. He is Skulk's partner and the enemy and frenemy of the Little Flying Bears.
- Slink (voiced by Rick Jones) – A shrewd snake who often assists Skulk and Sammy and is the frenemy of the Little Flying Bears.
- Grizelda (voiced by Kathleen Fee) – A large spider who lives in the terrible forest. She eats creatures smaller than herself is very protective of the syrup trees.
- Spike – A rat who comes from the city along with two rat subordinates.

=== Humans ===
- David (voiced by Daniel Brochu) – A friend of the bears and Leah's brother.
- Leah – A friend of the bears and David's sister.

== Episodes ==
1. Keep Out!
2. Attack of the Scarlet Serpents
3. The Juice Festival
4. Black Cloud
5. Runaway Truck
6. Hurray for Eggs!
7. A Birthday to Remember
8. The Traps
9. The Forbidden Flower
10. The White Rain
11. The Bears Christmas
12. Sore Losers
13. The White Bear
14. The Fountain of Youth
15. The Monster in the Mountain
16. The Great Drought
17. The Lumber Barons
18. The Wood Fairy
19. The Costume Ball
20. Hide and Seek
21. The Big Sting
22. The Reluctant Hero
23. The Virus
24. Dr. Skulk
25. A Gift from Space
26. Sing for the Rain
27. The First Encounter
28. The Rats
29. The River Rescue
30. The Storm
31. The Rats Revenge
32. The Outsider
33. Capture the Sun
34. Prescription for Pandemonium
35. Sabotage
36. The Visitor
37. Invasion
38. Power to Spare
39. Fire Bug

== Theme song ==
The theme song was composed by Julie Villandré. The lyrics were written by Jean-Pierre Liccioni and sung by voice actress Sonja Ball.

== Awards ==
The Little Flying Bears had won the coveted first prize for best animated children's series for 1990 at the FIMAJ International Festival in France.

== Home media ==
As with some other CinéGroupe series, the only major English-language DVD release is by Czech distributor North Video, featuring both Czech and English audio and original video (with English-language text) in the original production order. 38 episodes were released on 12 volumes, from July 31 to October 17, 2009, with one episode, "The Rats Revenge", missing and one duplicate.
