= Papa Beaver's Storytime =

- Created by: Paul Faucher
- Directed by: Greg Bailey; Pascale Moreaux; Jean Cubaud; Richard Dumont (voice)
- Starring: Walter Massey; Teddy Lee Dillon; Pauline Little; Bruce Dinsmore; Kathleen Fee; Rick Jones; Aimée Castle; Daniel Brochu; Maggie Castle; Michael Rudder
- Composer: Leon Aronson
- Countries of origin: France; Canada
- Original language: English
- No. of seasons: 3
- No. of episodes: 156

Production
- Executive producers: Micheline Charest; Jean-Piere Guérin
- Producers: Ronald A. Weinberg; Jacques Pepiot; Thierry Fontaine
- Running time: 6–7 minutes
- Production companies: CINAR Films; GMT Productions

Original release
- Network: Family Channel (Canada); Canal J & France 3 (France)
- Release: April 22, 1993 – August 16, 2002

Papa Beaver's Storytime (French: Les histoires du Père Castor) is an animated television series based on the Père Castor series of children's story books produced by French publisher's editor Paul Faucher. The series, which was produced by CINAR Films, originally aired from 1993 to 1995 and 2002 on the French channels Canal J and France 3, and later on the American channel Nickelodeon's Nick Jr. block between 1994 and 1997.

== Synopsis ==
The series presents a collection of tales based on the Père Castor series of French children's stories. Papa Beaver's Storytime is an animated television series which tells of Papa Beaver, a caretaker, a father figure, but most importantly, a storyteller.

The show starts out with some type of disagreement between the children, who then turn to Papa Beaver for a solution. He begins telling them some stories which are somehow related to the situation the children are in.

The stories are either a fable or a fairytale, ultimately using the morality of the story to teach the children a lesson about their own actions.

== Episodes ==
Original titles:

1. Gardon
2. Les trois cheveux d'or
3. Le grand cerf
4. Chante pinson
5. Horreur, peste, vinaigre
6. Les vacances de Mariette
7. L'extravagant désir de Cochon Rose
8. Micha et Macha
9. Jeannot Blanchet
10. Merlin Merlot
11. Tempête chez les lapins
12. Duvet ne veut pas voler
13. Pic et pic et colégram
14. Poulet des bois
15. Comment le chat trouva la maison de ses rêves
16. Un chat heureux
17. Le calife cigogne
18. Les nains et le géant
19. Le vilain petit canard
20. L'envol du petit canard
21. Le gâteau de Dialo
22. Le grand tam-tam
23. La vache Amélie
24. Tout-en-soie
25. Les animaux qui cherchaient l'été
26. La bonne vieille
27. Le chien de Brisquet
28. Le violon enchanté
29. Le cheveu de lune
30. Fourmiguette
31. Le chat botté
32. Le tigre en bois
33. Bernique
34. La reine des poissons
35. La grosse noix
36. Les malheurs de César
37. Émile
38. Eustache et Raoul
39. Tricoti tricota
40. Charlotte et la mère Citrouille
41. Les trois frères
42. Le tapis volant
43. Histoire de la lettre
44. Nuit de mai
45. La Grise et la poulette
46. Un pantalon pour mon ânon
47. L'histoire de Zo'hio
48. Le singe et l'hirondelle
49. Bravo tortue
50. Histoire d'ours et d'élans
51. Roule galette
52. L'apprenti sorcier
53. Les bons amis
54. Michka
55. Ne dérangez pas les dragons
56. Les piquants de Goz
57. La chèvre et les biquets
58. Les trois petits cochons
59. Marlaguette
60. Boucle d'or et les trois ours
61. Perlette, goutte d'eau
62. Demoiselle Libellule
63. La vache orange
64. Le cheval bleu
65. Le conte de La Marguerite
66. Cigalou
67. Le joueur de flûte de Hamelin
68. Le roi qui ne pouvait pas éternuer
69. Le mouchoir de Benjamin
70. Blancheline
71. Mon lit dans les étoiles
72. Le coup de pied
73. Le jamais content
74. La plume du caneton
75. Noix de coco cherche un ami
76. Le beau chardon d'Ali Boron
77. Tirbouchonnet a la rougeole
78. Deux petits cochons trop cochons
79. La boîte à soleil
80. La chouette d'Emilie
81. La plus mignonne des petites souris
82. La famille Rataton
83. Le petit cheval et le vieux chameau
84. La grande panthère noire
85. Le petit chacal très malin
86. Oiseaux de pluie
87. Du poison pour les dragons
88. Bien fait pour eux
89. Baba Yaga
90. Les deux bossus
91. Le petit zèbre
92. Histoire de singe
93. Pâquerette et poulette coquette
94. Les noces de Clémentine
95. Agnès a grandi
96. Agnès et la mouette gracieuse
97. Le chat de monsieur Neige
98. La souris, le chat et le petit garçon...
99. Poulerousse
100. Le petit cochon trop gourmand
101. Un tour de renard
102. La pêche aux anguilles
103. Le blaireau à lunettes
104. Le blaireau et sa voisine
105. Le monstre de Mr Stravinski
106. Écho le géant
107. Ma mère est une sorcière
108. Le manteau du Père Noël
109. Un cauchemar de grippe
110. Berk le crapaud
111. L'arbre à grands-pères
112. Rentrée sur l'île Vanille
113. Lisette
114. J'aime trop les chapeaux
115. Les musiciens de Brême
116. Le pont du diable
117. Le Noël de maître Belloni
118. Kolos et les quatre voleurs
119. Grosse peur pour bébé-loup
120. Maxime Loupiot
121. Feu follet est très pressé
122. Colas vole
123. La sorcière née du vinaigre
124. Castagrogne de carabistouille
125. Le chien qui n'avait pas de nom
126. Aimé Bienvenu et ses amis
127. Tante marraine
128. Crottes alors
129. Foming et le trésor des mers
130. Quand le soleil deviendra rouge
131. Mon meilleur ami est un chameau
132. Izmir
133. Le cartable magique
134. Super Papa
135. Les lettres de Biscotte Mulotte
136. Une dent contre la souris
137. Les animaux du zoo sont malades
138. Le monstre que personne n'a vu
139. Espèce de cucurbitacée
140. Le petit carnet d'Archibald
141. C'est mon nid
142. La poule, le coq, le cochon
143. Le virus de la rentrée
144. La guerre des kilos
145. Noël baobab
146. Épaminondas
147. Benjamin a une petite sœur
148. Titou a peur de tout
149. Le chant du hibou
150. La montagne du souriceau
151. Fleur des aurores
152. Le cordonnier de Bagdad
153. Lou la brebis
154. La petite fille et les loups
155. La boîte à trésors
156. Princesse Mariotte

== Cast ==
- Papa Beaver: Walter Massey
- Grandsons: Teddy Lee Dillon and Daniel Brochu
- Granddaughter: Pauline Little
- Additional voices: Bruce Dinsmore, Kathleen Fee, Rick Jones, Aimée Castle, Daniel Brochu, Maggie Castle, Michael Rudder, Thor Bishopric, Anik Matern, Sonja Ball, Vlasta Vrána, Tara Charendoff, Bronwen Mantel, Mark Camacho, A.J. Henderson, Arthur Holden, Paulina Gillis, Aron Tager, Susan Glover, Terrance Scammell
