= Terrence Scammell (Canadian actor) =

Canadian actor and voice director

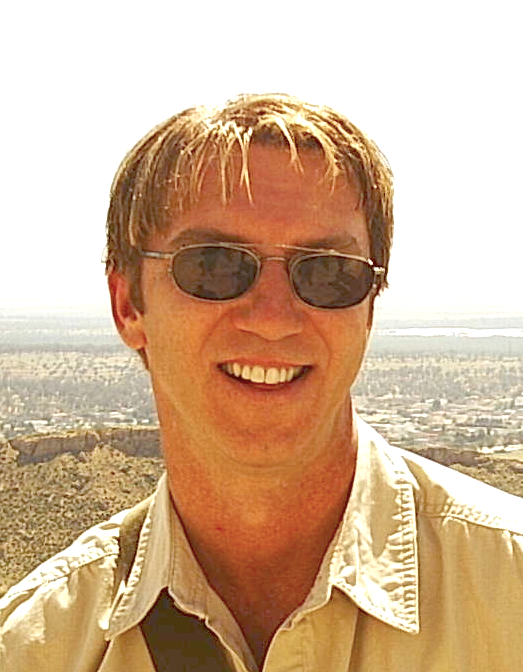
- Scammell in 2006
- Born: Terrence Frederick Scammell; Montreal, Quebec, Canada
- Other names: Terry Scammell; Terrence Scammel
- Occupations: Voice actor, voice director
- Years active: 1980–present
- Known for: The Little Lulu Show (1995–1998); Animal Crackers (1997–1999)
- Spouse: Sheila Singhal
- Website: web.archive.org/web/20110202062549/http://terrencescammell.com/

Terrence Frederick Scammell is a Canadian voice actor and voice director.

In a career that has spanned more than 40 years, Scammell has worked on hundreds of series, live-action films, documentaries and video games for BBC, PBS, Syfy, Teletoon, Ubisoft and other production companies around the world. He has also done many voice acting roles for film, television and video games in Montreal, Ottawa, Vancouver, New York City, and Los Angeles.

Scammell received an ACTRA award for voicing the character of Darph Bobo on Tripping the Rift, and his directing work has been nominated for awards in North America, Europe, and the United Kingdom.

== Early life ==
Scammell's family emigrated from England to Canada during the inter-war years. His father, Frederick Scammell, was a career army officer and a veteran of the Second World War. His mother, Kathleen Scammell, was a civil servant and a semi-professional singer.

Terrence was born in Montreal in 1958 and grew up in Ottawa. As a boy he received extensive musical training with the Gentlemen and Boy's Choir of St. Matthew's Anglican Church under Brian Law. After graduating, he pursued a successful career as a stage actor in Ottawa for more than a decade. Theatre of the Film Noir In the mid-1980s he transitioned to voice acting and voice directing.

== Personal life ==
Scammell is married to writer and blogger Sheila Singhal and divides his time between Montreal and Ottawa. He is a member of the unions ACTRA and the Canadian Actors' Equity Association.

== Selected voice directing credits ==
=== Animation and live-action ===
Series	Production company	Episodes
The Babaloos	CINAR	4 × 30 minutes
Belle and Sebastian	PVP and Gaumont Films	52 × 11 minutes
Bibi and Jennifer	Megafun	6 × 30 minutes
Bionicles	LEGO	4 × 30 minutes
The Big Garage	Prisma Productions	4 × 30 minutes
Billy and Buddy	Tooncan	26 × 30 minutes
Bob	Megafun	9 × 5 minutes
The Boy (also serves as casting director)	Tooncan	26 × 30 minutes
Carland Cross	Sonolab	26 × 30 minutes
A Cat, a Cow, and the Ocean	Tooncan	26 × 12 minutes
Celestin	Prisma	26 × 5 minutes
Children's Dreams	Megafun	26 × 5 minutes
Chico and Friends	Punch International	26 × 30 minutes
The Country Mouse and the City Mouse Adventures	CINAR	52 × 22 minutes
Daft Planet	CinéGroupe	13 × 30 minutes
Detective Lea Summer	Doublevue	26 × 30 minutes
Dog's World	Punch International	26 × 30 minutes
Dragon	Cité Amérique	52 × 10 minutes
Dragon Hunters	Tooncan	26 × 30 minutes
Flight Squad	CINAR	26 × 30 minutes
Fred the Caveman	Tube Studios	13 × 30 minutes
H_{2}O: Mermaid Adventures	Netflix	26 × 30 minutes
Harbour Patrol	Doublevue	26 × 30 minutes
Inuk	Pop 6	52 × 30 minutes
Journey to the West – Legends of the Monkey King	CINAR	26 × 30 minutes
Kit and Kaboodle	CinéGroupe	26 × 30 minutes
Kitou	Tooncan	52 × 10 minutes
Lil' Doc	Gala Productions/CBC	52 × 3 minutes
Little Nicholas	Method Animation	26 × 30 minutes
The Magic Canoe	Manito Media/Loogaroo/APTN	52 × 30 minutes
Malo Korrigan	Tooncan	52 × 10 minutes
Martin Morning	Tooncan	52 × 12 minutes
Mega Babies	CinéGroupe / Landmark Entertainment / Sony Wonder	26 × 30 minutes
Mica	Tooncan	26 × 11 minutes
A Miss Mallard Mystery	CINAR	26 × 30 minutes
Misty Island	Tooncan	52 × 12 minutes
Moot Moot	Tooncan	13 × 30 minutes
Oscar and Spike	Tooncan	13 × 30 minutes
Pig City	CinéGroupe	52 × 30 minutes
Ratz	Tooncan	52 × 10 minutes
Rotten Ralph	Megafun / Tooncan / Italtoons / BBC	26 × 30 minutes
Runes	Prime Entertainment Group	26 × 30 minutes
SOS	CinéGroupe	4 × 30 minutes
Sagwa, the Chinese Siamese Cat	CinéGroupe	80 × 10 minutes
Space Goofs	Xilam	52 × 11 minutes
Spaced Out	Tooncan	26 × 30 minutes
Spirou and Fantasio	CinéGroupe	8 × 30 minutes
Tempo Express	Tooncan/ZDF	26 × 30 minutes
The Three Pigs	CinéGroupe	26 × 30 minutes
The Tofus	CinéGroupe	26 × 30 minutes
Tripping the Rift	CinéGroupe	39 × 30 minutes
The Triplets	Cinélume	4 × 30 minutes
Tupu	Tooncan	26 × 30 minutes
Woofy	Tooncan	65 × 5 minutes
The Wacky World of Webster and Whim	Tooncan	26 × 30 minutes
Wumpa's World	Cité Amérique	8 × 10 minutes
Yakari	Tooncan	26 × 30 minutes
Zoom the White Dolphin	Marzipan Film/Media Valley	65 × 30 minutes

- Post-sync/ADR

=== Specials, documentaries and feature films ===
Name of special	Production house	Length
Arctic Territory	CBC	10 × 30 minutes
Fridge Magnets	Tube Studios	Pilot
Gap Travel Documentary	Greenspace	6 × 60 minutes
The Gaspé	Greenspace	120 minutes
Heavy Metal 2000	CinéGroupe	88 minutes
Journey to the West – Legends of the Monkey King	CINAR	90 minutes
The Love Bugs	Sonolab	30 minutes
Pinocchio 3000	CinéGroupe	90 minutes
Semmelweiss	Cinélume	120 minutes
Spank	CINAR	30 minutes
Big City Blues	Goodtimes	50 minutes
Six Days in June	PBS	90 minutes

- Post-sync/ADR

== Voice acting ==
=== Animated series ===
- The Adventures of Grady Greenspace (Cinélume)—Spike/Digby/Radar/Narrator
- The Adventures of Huckleberry Finn (CINAR/Saban)—Various
- The Adventures of Teddy Ruxpin (Atkinson Film Arts)—Digger
- Albert (Doublevue)—Various
- Animal Crackers (CINAR)—Eugene
- Anna Banana (Prisma Productions)—Ordo
- Around the World in 80 Dreams (Bellevue Pathé/Saban)—Various
- Arthur (CINAR)—Mr. Brain
- The Babaloos (CINAR)—Various
- Bad Dog (CinéGroupe)—Various
- Belle and Sebastian (PVP and Gaumont Films)—Caspar, Various
- The Big Garage (Prisma Productions)—London/Scrap
- Billy and Buddy (Tooncan)—Various
- The Bellflower Bunnies (Tooncan)—Various
- Bob in a Bottle (CINAR)—Various
- Bob Morane (Astral)—Bob Morane
- The Boy (Tooncan)—Various
- A Bunch of Munsch (CINAR)—Various
- C.L.Y.D.E. (CINAR)—Various
- Carland Cross (Sonolab)—Carland Cross
- Cat Tales (CINAR)—Various
- Celestin (Prisma Productions)—Celestin
- Chip and Charlie (CINAR)—Franklin
- Christopher Columbus (CinéGroupe)—Giovanni/Various
- Cinderella (Doublevue)—Zaroc/Various
- Cosmic Cowboys (CinéGroupe)—Various
- The Country Mouse and the City Mouse Adventures (CINAR)—Alexander (City Mouse)
- Daft Planet (CinéGroupe)—Mr. Smits
- Dog's World (Punch International)—Thomas
- Dragon (Tooncan)—Various
- The Eggs (Funbag)—Scramble/Various
- Faireez (Funbag)—Tim/Tucker/Spyballs
- Fennec (Astral)—Basil/Phil/Mayor
- Fishtronaut (Tooncan)—Zeke, Happy Plumb
- Flatmania (Millimages)—Various
- Flat! (Vivatoon)—Various
- Flight Squad (CINAR)—Various
- For Better or For Worse (Funbag)—John
- Fred the Caveman (Tube Studios)—The Witchdoctor
- Fred's Head (Technicolor)—Various
- Gawain (Muse)—Spider
- Gino the Chicken (Cinelume)—Various
- Gofrette (Subsequence)—Yellow ticket guy/Various
- Gon (Cinélume)—Mr. Uru, Various
- Grand Gul (SPR)—Various
- Gulliver's Travels (Bellevue Pathé/SABAN)—Gulliver
- H_{2}O: Mermaid Adventures (Netflix)—Various
- Hoze Houndz (Amberwood)—Various
- Inuk (Pop 6)—Kimik/Tayara/Tak
- Iron Nose: The Mysterious Knight (Tooncan)—Trojan
- Ivanhoe (CINAR)—Prince John
- Jack (CinéGroupe)—Dad
- Journey to the West – Legends of the Monkey King (CINAR)—Tripitaka
- The Jungle Book (CinéGroupe)—Various
- Jungle Show (CINAR/EVA Entertainment)- Lou the Wolf/Albert the Alligator/Ali the Camel
- Jungle Tales (CINAR/Saban)—Wolfbane/Harry/Jo-Jo
- Kid Paddle (Astral)—Various
- The Kids from Room 402 (CinéGroupe)—Various
- Kit and Kaboodle (CinéGroupe)—Various
- Kitou (Tooncan)—Googobbler
- Kitty Cats (Prisma Productions)—Willy
- The Legend of the North Wind (Nelvana)—The North Wind/Athanasius
- The Legend of White Fang (CINAR)—DeLazlo/Weedon
- Lilly's Island (Tooncan)—Various
- The Littl' Bits (CINAR/Saban)—Dr. Snooze-a-bit
- The Little Flying Bears (CinéGroupe)—Skulk
- The Little Lulu Show (CINAR)—Constable McNabb
- Malo Korrigan (Tooncan)—Malo Korrigan
- Martin Morning (Tooncan)—Various
- Maya the Bee (CINAR/Saban)—Various
- Mega Babies (CinéGroupe)—Various
- Mica (Tooncan)—Various
- Milo (Tooncan)—Father
- A Miss Mallard Mystery (CINAR)—Various
- Mona the Vampire (CINAR)—Various
- Monster Allergy (Rainbow/RAI/ZDF)—Various
- Monster Buster Club (Comet)—Various
- Moot Moot (Tooncan)—Various
- My Life Me (Carpediem)—Mr. Towes/Various
- My Big Friends (Tooncan) – Julio, George, The Dog
- The Mysteries of Alfred Hedgehog (Muse)—Mr. Russard
- Nanook (Astral)—Igluglik
- Night Hawk (CINAR)—Holmes/Various
- Nunavut (Tube)—Various
- Nutsberry Town (CinéGroupe)—Constable Carrot
- Oscar and Spike (Tooncan)—Various
- Ovide Video (CinéGroupe)—Bobo/Polo/Saffron
- Papa Beaver's Storytime (CINAR)—Various
- Papyrus (Astral)—Aker
- Patrol 03 (CINAR)—Various
- Pig City (CinéGroupe)—Various
- Pirate Family (Tooncan)—Various
- Pirates (Astral)—Various
- Princess Sissi (CinéGroupe)—Prince Franz/Herinrich/Gossip
- Prudence Gumshoe (Tooncan)—Inspector DeRock
- Punch! (Technicolor)—Narrator/Various
- The Magical Adventures of Quasimodo (CinéGroupe/Hearst Animation)—Francois/Azaroth/Various
- The Raccoons (Lacewood Productions/Evergreen Raccoons Television Productions)—Various
- Ratz (Tooncan)—Rapido
- Ripley's Believe It or Not (CINAR)—Various
- Robinson Sucroe (CINAR)—Grumblestone/Capt. Percy
- Rotten Ralph (Tooncan)—Bones/Fleabag
- Saban's Adventures of Pinocchio (CINAR/Saban)—Willie
- Saban's Adventures of the Little Mermaid (CINAR)—King/Various
- Sagwa, the Chinese Siamese Cat (CinéGroupe)—Lik-Lik/Various
- Samurai Pizza Cats (TATSUNOKO/SABAN)—Narrator/Guido/Various
- Sandokan (Cinélume/BRB Internacional)—Sandokan
- Sea Dogs (CinéGroupe)—Rocky/Sydney
- The Secret World of Benjamin Bear (Amberwood)—Sebastian/Simon/Toots/Mr. McLaren
- Shaolin Kids (Tooncan)—Various
- Simba the King Lion (Doublevue)—Bagheera/XL
- The Smoggies (CINAR)—Speed/Sport
- Snailympics (Tooncan)—Coach
- Space Goofs (Xilam)—Various
- Spaced Out (Tooncan)—Various
- Sparky and Arfman (CINAR)—Mr. Sniff
- Spirou and Fantasio (CinéGroupe)—Dr. Champignac
- Student Bodies (Téléscène)—Various
- Supernatural: The Animation (Technicolor)—Various
- Tempo Express (Tooncan)—Various
- Three Little Witches (Cinélume)—Various
- Toad Patrol (Funbag)—Fur Foot
- The Tofus (CinéGroupe)—Various
- Tommy and Oscar (Cinéume)—The Collector
- The Triplets (Cinélume)—Various
- Tripping the Rift (CinéGroupe)—Darph Bobo
- Trulli Tales (PVP and Gaumont Films)—Trulli King
- Tupu (Tooncan)—Various
- Wacky World of Webster and Whim (Tooncan)—Musty/Dusty
- What's with Andy? (CinéGroupe)—Principal DeRosa/Steve Rowgee Sr.
- Winx Club (Cinélume)—Ogron/Various
- Wombat City (Tooncan)—Various
- The Wombles (CINAR)—Tobermory
- Woofy (Tooncan)—Various
- Wunschpunsch (CinéGroupe)—Various
- X-DuckX (Greenspace Productions/Alphanim)—Various
- Yakari (Tooncan)—Restful Rock/Slow Strider
- Young Robin Hood (CINAR/Hanna-Barbera)—Little John/Various
- Zeroman (Amberwood)—Various
- Zoé Kezako (Tooncan)—Various

=== Animated features and specials ===
- The Alphabet (Doubleview)—Various
- Baa Baa Black Sheep (CINAR)—Baa Baa Black Sheep
- Ballerina/Leap! (Gaumont Films)—Merante, Postman
- Bibi and Jennifer (Greenspace)—Bibi
- David Copperfield (CinéGroupe/NBC)—Butcher/Baker/Various
- Felix and the Treasure of Morgäa (Félix et le trésor de Morgäa)
- Frère Jacques (CINAR)—Various
- Go Hugo Go (A. Film/Per Holst Filmproduktion/Miramax/CINAR)—Zig
- Happy Birthday Bunnykins (Lacewood Productions)—Stoatworth
- Heavy Metal 2000 (CinéGroupe)—Various
- Here Comes the Bride (CINAR)—Wainwright/Various
- The House on the Corner (Lacewood Productions)—Father
- Hugo The Movie Star (A. Film/Per Holst Filmproduktion/Miramax/CINAR)—Zig
- Katak: The Brave Beluga
- Moomins and the Comet Chase (Jupiter Film/SF/MTV3/Filmoteka Narodowa Polski/FST5)—Muskrat
- The Nightingale (Atkinson Film Arts)—Li Po/Courtier
- Pinocchio 3000 (CinéGroupe)—Scambocop
- The Prince's Rain (CINAR)—Various
- Ricky Raindrop (KLA)—Prof. Lymnos/Various
- Rooster Doodle Do (10th Ave. Prod.)—Gustave, Mailman
- Sahara (Mandarin Films)—Bad Snake, Chief Chief, Old Man, Ambiances
- Troll: The Tale of a Tail (Sagatoon)—Grimmer
- Spookley the Square Pumpkin (Holiday Hill Farm)—Allen
- Sur le Pont d'Avignon (CINAR)—Harlequin
- The Teddy Bears and Buster (Lacewood Productions)—Father
- The Tin Soldier (Atkinson Film Arts)—Sammy
- How The Toys Saved Christmas (CINAR)—Various
- Troll The Tale of a Tail (Sagatoon)—Grimmer

== Video games ==
- Assassin's Creed III
- Beowulf: The Game
- Evolution Worlds
- Far Cry 2
- Far Cry 3: Blood Dragon
- Hype: The Time Quest
- Jagged Alliance
- Jagged Alliance: Deadly Games
- Jagged Alliance 2
- Naruto: Rise of a Ninja
- Nemesis: The Wizardry Adventure
- Prince of Persia: Warrior Within
- Rainbow Six 3: Black Arrow
- Realms of Arkania: Shadows over Riva
- Splinter Cell
- Splinter Cell: Chaos Theory
- Still Life
- TMNT
- Wizardry 8
