= Jack (TV series) =

- Also known as: Jack the Explorer
- Genre: Science fiction Educational
- Developed by: François Trudel
- Directed by: Steven Majaury
- Starring: Rick Jones; Kathleen Fee; Dawn Ford; Eleanor Noble; Holly Gauthier-Frankel; Claudia Besso; Gayle Garfinkle; Terrence Scammell
- Opening theme: "Let's Jet"
- Ending theme: "Let's Jet" (instrumental)
- Countries of origin: Canada; Singapore
- No. of seasons: 3
- No. of episodes: 39 (grouped); 78 (individually) (list of episodes)

Production
- Executive producers: François Trudel; Kok Cheong Wong; Vincent Leroux; Vic Pelletier
- Producers: François Trudel; Kok Cheong Wong
- Running time: 22 minutes (grouped); 11 minutes (ungrouped)
- Production companies: Sparky Animation; PVP Media (Groupe PVP)

Original release
- Network: TVO Kids
- Release: September 7, 2011 – October 21, 2014

Jack (sometimes called Jack the Explorer) is a 3D-animated TV series broadcast by TVOntario as a part of its TVOKids lineup. It is about an alien named Jack and a brother and sister who make friends with him, while hiding his existence from their parents. First created in 2009, its TV premiere was scheduled for September 5, 2011, but was actually aired two days later. As of October 21, 2014, there are at least 39 22-minute episodes in the series, each consisting of two 11-minute segments, with a total of 78 individually-named stories.

== Plot ==
Jack is a fun-loving alien explorer whose coolest discovery yet is the amazing, planet Earth! With the help of his alien dog Rocket and his robotic assistant C.H.I.P., he sets out on a series of fun and daring adventures to learn all about this strange new planet! Showing him the ropes are his three new friends: a nine-year-old boy named Nico, his little sister Sam, and their slacker pal Yoki. Together they help Jack (and us) understand how things work here on Earth...and beyond!

== Characters ==
=== Aliens ===
- Jack the Alien (voiced by Rick Jones)
- Rocket the Dog (voiced by Rick Jones)
- C.H.I.P. the Computer (voiced by Dawn Ford)
- High Commander (voiced by Kathleen Fee)

=== Earthlings ===
- Nico (voiced by Eleanor Noble) – The 9-year-old elder brother.
- Sam (voiced by Holly Gauthier-Frankel) – The younger sister.
- The siblings' mom (voiced by Claudia Besso)
- The siblings' dad (voiced by Terrence Scammell)
- Yoki (voiced by Holly Gauthier-Frankel) – The siblings' black-haired slacker pal.
- Mrs. Weebler (voiced by Gayle Garfinkle) – The nosey next door neighbor and a very serious woman.
- Dr. Molecule,

== Episodes ==
Note: All episodes are directed by Steven Majaury.

=== Season 1 (2011) ===
No.	Title	Written by	Original release date	Prod. code
1	"Bath Time"	Dennise Fordham	September 7, 2011	101
1	"Bad Hair Day"	Miles Smith	September 7, 2011	102
2	"Meteor Madness"	Deborah Jarvis	September 11, 2011	103
2	"Jackosaurus"	Gerard Lewis	September 11, 2011	104
3	"The Jack Show"	Bruce Robb	September 17, 2011	105
3	"Hiccup Pup"	Miles Smith	September 17, 2011	106
4	"The Black Hole"	Gerard Lewis	September 18, 2011	107
4	"Saturn's Rings"	Steven Schnier	September 18, 2011	108
5	"Mission: Ice Impossible"	Scott Albert	September 24, 2011	109
5	"Ear Wax"	Steven Schnier	September 24, 2011	110
6	"The Food Chain Ate My Homework"	Miles G. Smith	September 25, 2011	111
6	"Tummy Trouble"	Deborah Jarvis	September 25, 2011	112
7	"Do the Twister"	Penelope Laurence	October 1, 2011	113
7	"Swimming with Aliens"	John Mein	October 1, 2011	114
8	"Web of Trouble"	Nicolas Boisvert	October 2, 2011	115
8	"Let's Go Batty!"	Story by : Scott Albert; Teleplay by : Deborah Jarvis	October 2, 2011	116
9	"Ant it the Truth?"	Hugh Duffy	October 8, 2011	117
9	"Super Fly"	Scott Albert	October 8, 2011	118
10	"Dog Day Afternoon"	Miles Smith	October 9, 2011	119
10	"Dr. Jack"	Miles Smith	October 9, 2011	120
11	"Sink or Swim"	Steven Schnier	October 15, 2011	121
11	"Aliens!"	Deborah Jarvis	October 15, 2011	122
12	"Beano Gets Cavities"	Miles G. Smith	October 16, 2011	123
12	"What Goes Up..."	Miles G. Smith	October 16, 2011	124
13	"Let it Bee"	Penelope Laurence	October 22, 2011	125
13	"Botanical Menace"	Nicolas Boisvert	October 22, 2011	126

=== Season 2 (2012) ===
No.	Title	Written by	Original release date	Prod. code
1	"Freezin' Hot"	Story by : Gerard Lewis; Teleplay by : Miles G. Smith	January 16, 2012	127
1	"Cruise Ship"	Nicolas Boisvert	January 16, 2012	128
2	"Rock n' Rose"	Story by : Andrée Lambert; Teleplay by : Miles G. Smith	January 18, 2012	129
2	"Stinky Business"	Marie-France Landry	January 18, 2012	130
3	"Jack and the Snake"	Story by : Nicole Lavigne; Teleplay by : Terry Saltsman Story by : Andrée Lambert; Teleplay by : Miles G. Smith	January 23, 2012	131
3	"Yeti!"	Story by : Nicole Lavigne; Teleplay by : Terry Saltsman Story by : Andrée Lambert; Teleplay by : Miles G. Smith	January 23, 2012	132
4	"Turn Left, Turn Right, Turn Left"	Nicole Keefler	January 25, 2012	133
4	"Somewhere Over the Rainbow"	Story by : Miles G. Smith; Teleplay by : Nicole Keefler	January 25, 2012	134
5	"Sleepwalking Jack"	Anne-Marie Perrotta	February 19, 2012	135
5	"See No Evil"	Story by : Miles G. Smith; Teleplay by : Nicolas Boisvert	February 19, 2012	136
6	"Jacky's Comet"	Story by : Miles G. Smith and Nicolas Boisvert; Teleplay by : Nicolas Boisvert	April 14, 2012	137
6	"Season's Change"	Story by : Tean Schultz; Teleplay by : Stephan Dubreuil and Tean Schultz	April 14, 2012	138
7	"A Robot's Best Friend"	Story by : Miles G. Smith; Teleplay by : Anne-Marie Perrotta	April 15, 2012	139
7	"Poison Ivy"	Story by : Andrée Lambert; Teleplay by : Miles G. Smith	April 15, 2012	140
8	"Poison Pets"	Story by : Miles G. Smith; Teleplay by : Nicolas Boisvert	April 21, 2012	141
8	"Volcano No!"	Story by : Tean Schultz; Teleplay by : Stephan Dubreuil and Tean Schultz	April 21, 2012	142
9	"A Ghost Story"	Anne-Marie Perrotta	April 22, 2012	143
9	"Eye Spy!"	Story by : Miles G. Smith and Nicole Keefler; Teleplay by : Nicole Keefler	April 22, 2012	144
10	"White Water Dizzies"	Story by : Nicole Lavigne; Teleplay by : Miles G. Smith	April 28, 2012	145
10	"Rain, Rain Go Away"	Story by : Miles G. Smith and Nicole Keefler; Teleplay by : Nicole Keefler	April 28, 2012	146
11	"Jack's Fault Line"	Story by : Tean Schultz; Teleplay by : Stephan Dubreuil and Tean Schultz	April 29, 2012	147
11	"Stingberry Jelly"	Story by : Miles G. Smith; Teleplay by : Tean Schultz and Stephan Dubreuil	April 29, 2012	148
12	"Eel-ectricity"	Nicole Keefler	May 5, 2012	149
12	"Bite Makes Right"	Story by : Miles G. Smith; Teleplay by : Anne-Marie Perrotta	May 5, 2012	150
13	"A Sticky Situation"	Story by : Miles G. Smith; Teleplay by : Anne-Marie Perrotta	May 6, 2012	151
13	"Feeling Blue"	Story by : Andrée Lambert; Teleplay by : Nicolas Boisvert and Miles G. Smith	May 6, 2012	152

=== Season 3 (2014) ===
No.	Title	Written by	Original release date	Prod. code
1	"Jack Earns His Wings"	Terry Saltsman	July 28, 2014	201
1	"Flea Hunter"	Nicolas Boisvert	July 28, 2014	202
2	"To the Moon"	Anne-Marie Perrotta	July 29, 2014	203
2	"The Roachmobile"	Miles Smith	July 29, 2014	204
3	"Night Light Fright!"	Tean Schultz	July 30, 2014	205
3	"Zapped!"	Anne-Marie Perrotta	July 30, 2014	206
4	"Darn Dams"	Miles Smith	July 31, 2014	207
4	"Hot Dog!"	Paul Stoica	July 31, 2014	208
Jack's attempt to slow a dangerous river with beaver dams causes a major flood that threatens Nico and Sam's house. After Rocket eats too much spicy food, the suddenly-smoke-breathing alien dog has everyone yelling "fire!"
5	"Jelly Jailed"	Story by : Miles Smith; Teleplay by : Nicolas J. Boisvert	August 1, 2014	209
5	"No Fuel Like an Old Fuel"	Paddy Granleese	August 1, 2014	210
A secret plan to help Mom make a prize-winning jelly sculpture results in a miniature Rocket getting "set" inside the jelly. But Jack's rescue attempts are thwarted by the near-constant presence of a very-distressed Mom. When Jack's ship runs out of fuel, the pals race against time to make enough bio-fuel for Jack to get home... before Mom and Dad discover his spaceship hidden in the garage.
6	"Jack and the Dolphin"	Terry Saltsman	September 2, 2014	211
6	"The Memory Game"	Anita Kapila	September 2, 2014	212
Jack must find a young aquarium dolphin that he accidentally released into the ocean before the gentle mammal gets into trouble. After Jack bumps his head, he becomes convinced he's a human... free to walk about on Earth and interact with its inhabitants, starting with Nico and Sam's parents!
7	"Hydro-Power!"	Miles Smith	September 10, 2014	213
7	"Jack or RoboJack?"	Anne-Marie Perrotta	September 10, 2014	214
Jack's new "Iron Man" type hydraulic suit goes out of control and launches an unmanned attack on Nico's neighborhood! Jack is content to let his robot replacement do all his work until the overly efficient RoboJack shorts out, leaving the duo stranded in the jungle.
8	"Follow Your Nose!"	Miles Smith	September 16, 2014	215
8	"Horse Whisperer"	Evan Thaler Hickey	September 16, 2014	216
When Jack's new invisible probe goes out of control, the pals must find it before the alien device causes unseen mayhem around the city. After Jack causes Sam to lose her voice just before a singing contest, the aliens shrink down and explore her vocal cords in an attempt to figure out what the problem is.
9	"A Touch of Garlic"	Anita Kapila	September 23, 2014	217
9	"Taste Bud Buddies"	Story by : Tean Schultz; Teleplay by : Nicolas J. Boisvert	September 23, 2014	218
Jack tries some garlic in an attempt to ease his cold, but the pungent herb has some unintended silly side effects on his personality. To help his pal enjoy more flavors, Jack modifies some of Nico's taste buds, causing his tongue to swell up to giant proportions.
10	"Cough Drop-ins"	Paul Stoica	September 30, 2014	219
10	"Lightning Strike"	Jonathan Jourdenais	September 30, 2014	220
When Yoki accidentally inhales a miniature Rocket, the little alien dog gets stuck in his lungs, prompting a desperate rescue mission by his miniaturized alien pals! When Jack sets out to create a lone bolt of lightning, he accidentally triggers a dangerous storm that quickly gets out of control.
11	"Invasive Invaders"	Patrick Granleese	October 7, 2014	221
11	"The Rubber Prank"	Anne-Marie Perrotta	October 7, 2014	222
When Jack brings an adorable alien pet to Earth to show the kids, the fast-reproducing creatures start taking over the entire ecosystem. When Jack's face is caught on camera, the pals must make a rubber mask of Jack's face to convince everyone the "alien sighting" was just a prank.
12	"Hide in Plain Sight"	Nicolas J. Boisvert	October 14, 2014	223
12	"G-Force"	Paul Stoica and Jean-François D'Aoust	October 14, 2014	224
When Rocket inadvertently gains camouflage abilities, the gang suddenly has their hands full searching for an almost invisible alien dog that thinks he's playing hide-and-seek! When Jack's ship crash lands on a deserted planet, the pals are in danger of being trapped there forever by its super-strong gravity.
13	"Vertigo No-No!"	Paul Stoica and Jean-François D'Aoust	October 21, 2014	225
13	"Adrenaline"	Nicolas J. Boisvert	October 21, 2014	226
Jack brings an alien gizmo to Earth to speed up Nico's slowwww internet which causes everyone around to suffer vertigo. But the device's automated defense system prevents Jack from getting close enough to shut it off! A bizarre alien reaction to a bee sting causes Rocket to inflate like a giant floating balloon-and Jack must find a source of adrenaline to help return his pal to normal.
