= Kathleen Fee =

Canadian actress

- Born: Montreal, Quebec, Canada
- Occupations: Actress, writer, adapter, translator, voice director

Kathleen Fee (born in Montreal, Quebec) is a Canadian actress, writer and director.

== Filmography ==
=== Film ===
| Year | Title | Role | Notes |
|---|---|---|---|
| 1982 | Visiting Hours | Emergency Nurse | |
| 1983 | Cross Country | Airline Clerk | |
| 1984 | Samson & Sally | Seagull | English version; voice |
| 1986 | Cat City | Additional voice | English version; voice |
| 1987 | Future Block | | English version; voice |
| 1990 | The Jungle Book | Meshua | English version; voice |
| 1991 | Charlie Strapp and Froggy Ball Flying High | Drottning Tallkotte | English version; voice |
| 1992 | The Legend of the North Wind | The Sea | |
| 1993 | Sweet Killing | Mrs. Devon | |
| 1993 | The Return of the North Wind | The Sea | |
| 1995 | The Wrong Woman | Matron | |
| 1997 | Zandile, in the Light of the Ubuntu | Narrator | |
| 1998 | Little Men | Narrator / Molly | |
| 1998 | Home Team | Social Service Woman | |
| 1999 | The Witness Files | Prison Matron | |
| 2000 | Artificial Lies | Judge Barrett | |
| 2000 | Café Olé | Mrs. Kaye | |
| 2002 | Savage Messiah | Social Services Receptionist | |
| 2003 | Chasing Holden | Female Cashier | |
| 2007 | I'm Not There | Duchess | |
| 2008 | Moomin and Midsummer Madness | Moominmamma | English version; voice |
| 2010 | Outbreak: Anatomy of a Plague | Voice | |
| 2010 | Moomins and the Comet Chase | Moominmamma / Shop Lady | English version; voice |
| 2010 | Everywhere | Squeamish Woman | |
| 2011 | The Moth Diaries | Miss Bobbie | |
| 2012 | The Words | Woman on the Bus | |
| 2012 | Kaspar | Background voices | Also English translator |
| 2012 | Mirror Mirror | Noble #4 | |
| 2012 | Imaginaerum | Tracy Gainman | Voice |
| 2012 | Wallis Simpson, Loved and Lost | Narrator | |
| 2013 | The Informant | Couturière | |
| 2017 | Moomins and the Winter Wonderland | Moominmamma | English version; voice |
| 2018 | Appiness | Marie Clarke | |
| 2020 | Hall | Betty | |
| 2022 | Moonfall | Elaine Houseman | |
| 2023 | The Sacrifice Game | Headmistress | |
| 2026 | Lydia and the Mist Rider | Esther | Voice role, English version |

=== Television ===
| Year | Title | Role | Notes |
|---|---|---|---|
| 1986 | The Wonderful Wizard of Oz | Mombi | Voice |
| 1988 | Bobobobs | Petronella | Episode: "Picknick op een klein tropisch planeetje" |
| 1990 | The Little Flying Bears | Margaret / Arlene | 2 episodes |
| 1991 | Adventures of the Little Mermaid | Queen | English version; voice |
| 1991 | Madeline and the Gypsies | Gypsy Mama | Television short |
| 1991–1992 | Young Robin Hood | Mathilda | 26 episodes |
| 1992 | A Bunch of Munsch | Various | 2 episodes |
| 1992 | The Boys of St. Vincent | Office Manager | Television film |
| 1992 | The Legend of White Fang | Bella | Episode: "The Trap" |
| 1993 | Papa Beaver's Storytime | Various | English version; voice |
| 1993 | David Copperfield | Peggotty | Television film |
| 1993 | Les grands procès | Kathleen Wlitshire | Episode: "Fred Rose" |
| 1994–1995 | Robinson Sucroe | Monday | 7 episodes |
| 1996–2000 | Are You Afraid of the Dark? | Various | 3 episodes |
| 1996–2016 | Arthur | Ms. Morgan / Mrs. Tibble | 17 episodes |
| 1997–1998 | The Country Mouse and the City Mouse Adventures | Various | 25 episodes |
| 1998 | The Mystery Files of Shelby Woo | Mattingly | Episode: "The Paul Revere Mystery" |
| 1999 | The Legend of Sleepy Hollow | Mrs. Van Tassle | Television film |
| 2000–2001 | Wunschpunsch | Tyrannia Vampirella | 41 episodes |
| 2001 | Blind Terror | Records Clerk | Television film |
| 2001 | For Better or for Worse | Additional voices | Television film |
| 2001–2003 | The New Adventures of Lucky Luke | Big Bone Bear, additional voices | English version; voice |
| 2002 | The Stork Derby | Outraged Woman | Television film |
| 2002 | Bliss | Etta Schmidt | Episode: "Six Days" |
| 2002 | The Case of the Whitechapel Vampire | Mme Karavsky | Television film |
| 2003 | The Reagans | Nursing Home Attendant | Television film |
| 2004 | Tripping the Rift | Additional voice | 3 episodes |
| 2004 | When Angels Come to Town | Marion | Television film |
| 2004 | Cosmic Cowboys | Granny | Television film |
| 2005 | Choice: The Henry Morgentaler Story | Humanist Member | Television film |
| 2005 | Mayday | Claude Burgniard | Episode: "The Killing Machine" |
| 2005 | 3 x rien | Tante Yvonne | Episode: "1,2,3 Go Toronto!" |
| 2006 | He Shoots, He Scores | Mère de Mark Stevens | Episode #1.22 |
| 2006 | René Lévesque | Femme #1 | Episode: "L'enfant terrible (1962-66)" |
| 2006 | Thrill of the Kill | Sheriff Teri Boesch | Television film |
| 2008 | Dr. Jekyll and Mr. Hyde | Mrs Lanyon | Television film |
| 2009 | Hidden Crimes | Principal Schneider | Television film |
| 2011 | Being Human | Barbara the Ghost | Episode: "Children Shouldn't Play with Undead Things" |
| 2011 | Stealing Paradise | Judge Olivia Mathers | Television film |
| 2011 | Cyberbully | History Teacher | Television film |
| 2011 | Who Is Simon Miller? | Grand-Mere | Television film |
| 2011 | Jack | High Commander | 13 episodes |
| 2012–2020 | Fatal Vows | Narrator | 88 episodes |
| 2013 | Exploding Sun | Claire Witkins | Television film |
| 2014 | 19-2 | Birthday Boy's Mother | Episode: "Welfare Day" |
| 2014 | 14 - Diaries of the Great War | Käthe Kollwitz | Television film |
| 2015 | Quantico | Federal Judge | Episode: "Guilty" |
| 2015–2016 | This Life | Helen | 2 episodes |
| 2018 | Broken Trust | Mrs. Hawes | Episode: "Brother VS Brother |
| 2018 | The Detectives | Mrs. Mariani | Episode: "Hatred" |
| 2018 | L'Agent Jean: comment sauver le monde en 90 secondes | Martha | 15 episodes |
| 2019 | Yidlife Crisis | Receptionist | Episode: "Jewish General Hospital" |
| 2019 | Street Legal | Mrs. Johnson | Episode: "Moving Day" |
| 2020 | L'heure Bleue | Notary receptionist | Episode #4.14 |
| 2021 | Christmas in My Heart | Linda Buchanan | Television film |

=== Video games ===
| Year | Title | Role |
|---|---|---|
| 2001 | Wizardry 8 | Voice |
| 2017 | Assassin's Creed Origins | Voice |
| 2021 | Arkham Horror: Mother's Embrace | Agatha Cranes |
