= Bronwen Mantel =

Canadian actress (born 1948)

- Born: 29 October 1948 (age 77); Montreal, Quebec, Canada
- Other name: Bronwyn Mantel
- Occupation: Actress
- Years active: 1973–present

Bronwen Mantel (born 29 October 1948) is a Canadian actress. Mantel has appeared in numerous movies and has done extensive voice acting in animated films and television series.

== Early life and career ==
Mantel was born in Montreal, Quebec, Canada. She has appeared in several movies including Secret Window and Gothika, and as a voice actress in the TV series Mega Babies, Adventures of the Little Koala, Arthur, Bobobobs, Tripping the Rift, Sharky and George, The Wonderful Wizard of Oz, Papa Beaver's Storytime, A Bunch of Munsch, Young Robin Hood, The Smoggies, Princess Sissi, What's with Andy?, Christopher Columbus, Adventures of the Little Mermaid, Adventures of Pinocchio, Caillou, The Little Lulu Show, Cat Tales, The World of David the Gnome, Spirou, Anna Banana, Diplodos, Nutsberry Town, Lucky Luke, C.L.Y.D.E., Jungle Tales, Pig City, Wunschpunsch, Sea Dogs, Woofy, Fred the Caveman, Bob in a Bottle, Jim Button, The Tofus, The Kids from Room 402, Night Hood, Flight Squad, Ivanhoe, Bumpety Boo, Oscar and Spike, Ocean Tales, The Magical Adventures of Quasimodo, Creepschool, Mica, Belphegor, Zoe and Charlie, Gino the Chicken, Pet Pals, The Twins, Marsupilami, Wombat City, Mona the Vampire, Zoé Kezako, The Babaloos, Robinson Sucroe, My Goldfish Is Evil!, Inuk, Ripley's Believe It or Not!, Chip and Charlie, Sagwa, the Chinese Siamese Cat, The Real Story of, Tommy and Oscar, Samurai Pizza Cats, Malo Korrigan, Turtle Island, Milo, Lola and Virginia, Dragon Hunters, Gofrette, The Legend of White Fang, Adventures of Peter Pan, Gulliver's Travels and Animal Crackers.

She also appears as Bronwyn Mantel.

== Partial filmography ==
Year	Movie	Role	Production Company
1979	In Praise of Older Women	Woman in Cafe	G. Kaczender/RSL Films
1979	City on Fire	Sarah Watts/welfare Mother	Astral Films
1980	Revolution's Orphans*	Ruth Nemets	National Film Board / John Smith
1980	Hog Wild	Mrs. Rumble	FilmPlan
1983	Of Unknown Origin	Principal/Boss' wife	Mutuel Films
1983	Illusions	Principal/Anne Desmond	CBS Films
1985	Joshua Then and Now	Mrs. Friar	RSL Films / Ted Kotcheff
1986	Spearfield's Daughter	Ilse Fuchs	
1987	The Last Straw	Principal	National Film Board
1987	Crazy Moon	Anne's Mother	Allegro Films
1988	Pin	Mrs. Linden	Filmline / Sandor Stern
1990	Backstab	Principal/Judge	Allegro Films
1993	Map of the Human Heart	Woman Guest	Miramax
1994	Breakthrough	Gaylene Janus	Filmline / Piers Haggard
1996	Mother Night	Howard Campbell's mother	Applause Films / Nick Nolte
1996	Rainbow	School principal	Filmline/ Bob Hoskins
1996	Arthur	Mrs. MacGrady	WGBH/Cookie Jar/9 Story Entertainment
1997	Voices from a Locked Room	Madge Ryan	U.K./Malcom Clarke
2000	Stardom	Principal/PBS pledge host	Alliance Atlantis/Denys Arcand
2003	Gothika	Irene	Dark Castle-Warner
2004	Secret Window	Greta Bowie	Grand Slam Productions / David Koepp
2006	The Favorite Game	Esther Cohen	Cine Qua Non Films
2006	Black Eyed Dog	Donna	Pierre Gang
2006	Banshee	Mildred Totty	Oygen
2008	Swamp Devil	Shelly	Muse Entertainment
2016	Ballerina (Note: The film was released in the United States under the title Leap.)	Mother Superior (voice)	

- Genie Nominee: Best Astress in a non-feature 1980 and Earle Grey Award: BEST ACTRESS, ACTRA Awards 1980

== Sources ==
- https://web.archive.org/web/20090930075023/http://www.bronwenmantel.com/
- Bronwen Mantel at IMDb
- http://www.fandango.com/bronwenmantel/filmography/p120797
- tv.com
- http://www.hollywood.com/celebrity/Bronwen_Mantel/1407851
