= Fatal Vows =

American TV documentary series (2012–2020)

- Genre: Documentary
- Starring: Brian Russell; Stacy Kaiser
- Narrated by: Kathleen Fee
- Country of origin: United States
- No. of seasons: 7
- No. of episodes: 88

Production
- Executive producers: John Kuyk; Pamela Deutsch
- Producer: Judith Beauchemin
- Running time: 44 minutes (excluding commercials)
- Production company: CMJ Productions

Original release
- Network: Investigation Discovery
- Release: November 17, 2012 – April 20, 2020

Fatal Vows is an American television documentary series on Investigation Discovery that debuted on November 17, 2012. The series is presented by Brian Russell, an attorney as well as a forensic and clinical psychologist and Stacy Kaiser, a licensed psychotherapist and relationship expert, and is narrated by Kathleen Fee. It is filmed in Quebec portraying Canadian actors as subjects in each episode where it tells the stories of marriages that turned deadly. On March 1, 2018, it was announced that the series has been renewed for a sixth season. In February 2020, after a two-year hiatus, the series returned for a seventh and final season. In April 2020, it was announced that the series would not be renewed. However, many episodes aired in an edited half hour version called Fatal Vows: Twisted Desires.

== Episodes ==
Season	Episodes	Originally released	
Season	Episodes	First released	Last released
1	10	November 17, 2012	January 19, 2013
2	13	November 2, 2013	April 5, 2014
3	13	November 8, 2014	January 31, 2015
4	13	October 10, 2015	January 2, 2016
5	13	May 13, 2017	August 12, 2017
6	13	August 11, 2018	November 10, 2018
7	13	February 3, 2020	April 20, 2020

=== Season 1 (2012-2013) ===
No. overall	No. in season	Title	Original release date
1	1	"Dead Silence"	November 17, 2012
Bob and Becky Klosterman seem like a model couple with the ideal life until one of them snaps.
2	2	"Blood and Wine"	November 24, 2012
When Nancy Lyon dies mysteriously in a hospital; her husband Richard is suspected.
3	3	"Secrets of a Dying Man"	December 1, 2012
Is there more to Elizabeth and Angelo's relationship? And if so, will either one be able to survive it?
4	4	"The Last Seduction"	December 8, 2012
Things start to turn bad soon after John and Tracey are married; the family pet disappears and the neighbor turns up dead.
5	5	"Death in the Family"	December 15, 2012
Kraig and Karen Kahler live a comfortable life until sexual obsession spins everything out of control.
6	6	"Lies and Death"	December 22, 2012
A happy relationship is destroyed by a mysterious gunman.
7	7	"Your Cheatin' Heart"	December 29, 2012
Chris and Karon Pugh seem to have a model life -- until their dark secrets are revealed.
8	8	"Exquisite Lies"	January 5, 2012
A couple live a lifes of luxury until dark secrets unravel everything.
9	9	"The Edge of Love"	January 12, 2013
High school sweethearts marry young but are driven into despair when they lose of their youth.
10	10	"The Pastor, His Wife, Their Son, and His Mistress"	January 19, 2013
A love triangle reveals more than one person wanted Pauletta Burleson dead.

=== Season 2 (2013-2014) ===
No. overall	No. in season	Title	Original release date
11	1	"Half-Baked Alaska"	November 2, 2013
A women tries to escape her past by moving to Alaska; soon the past begins to haunt her and her husband.
12	2	"In a Lonely Place"	November 9, 2013
A couple is lead down a dark path of jealousy and conspiracy.
13	3	"Romance Reloaded"	November 16, 2013
High school sweethearts rekindle their romance after 20 years; the Georgia family unleashes a string of infidelity, violence and murder.
14	4	"An Inconvenient Marriage"	November 23, 2013
Cristobal and Jennifer marry after battling a sickness together but Cristobal reveals his abuse side after the knot is tied.
15	5	"Not In Kansas Anymore"	November 30, 2013
Things take a deadly turn for two teenagers when they befriend a sexually adventurous couple.
16	6	"The Other Side of the Tracks"	December 7, 2013
Ed, a bad boy truck driver marries a single mother; Ed straightens out and is ready to be a family man; the spark dies.
17	7	"Unholy Trinity"	December 14, 2013
A seemingly average farming couple's kinky behavior behind closed doors leads them into a deadly love triangle.
18	8	"Black Pearl"	December 21, 2013
The quickie marriage of Tammy Ellis and David Gatlin heads for a terrifying and bloody confrontation.
19	9	"Final Notice"	December 28, 2013
Financial fraud turns a marriage into a web of deception.
20	10	"Descent Into Madness"	March 15, 2014
Janene and Troy Patton are madly in love but are on the brink of financial disaster; Janene claims one of her psychiatric patients raped her, the fallout becomes deadly.
21	11	"Dazed and Deadly"	March 22, 2014
A cocktail of jealously, infidelity and energy drinks plunges Amanda and Woody into an abyss of sex and violence.
22	12	"Black Widow"	March 29, 2014
As Sharon and Perry Nelson's relationship falters, a new lover lurking on the fringes threatens to introduce more than a dash of violence into an already volatile mix.
23	13	"Burning Love"	April 5, 2014
Hattie Reynolds, struggling to provide for her daughter in Baton Rouge, meets and marries her dream man, but when they divorce, an already volatile custody dispute turns deadly.

=== Season 3 (2014-2015) ===
No. overall	No. in season	Title	Original release date
24	1	"Mid-Life Murder"	November 8, 2014
Arthur Burney believes it's true love when he runs off with the waitress from his favorite bar, but the couple's marriage comes to a violent end 16 years later.
25	2	"Death of a Salesman"	November 15, 2014
Judy Parker's rumored romantic entanglements with a string of her husband's employees prove to be too much for him to bear.
26	3	"Big League Murder"	November 22, 2014
NFL football player Tommy Kane becomes depressed and murders his wife after he is cut from the Seattle Seahawks.
27	4	"Murder By Proxy"	November 29, 2014
Marcia's relationship with a trucker causes resentment on the part of her teenage daughter and sets off a chain reaction leading to six arrests and one dead body.
28	5	"Death for Dessert"	December 6, 2014
Tami and Alan get married within months after meeting, but when Tami starts using her good looks to get what she wants from every man she meets, one of them will end up dead.
29	6	"Killing Time"	December 13, 2014
After 20 years of marriage, Ray discovers he has been betrayed by wife Karla and sets into motion a bizarre chain of events.
30	7	"Hanging by a Thread"	December 20, 2014
Tanya Buschman is just getting out of a nasty marriage when she falls for a handsome bartender, but it's not long before jealousy in their relationship leads to a suspicious suicide.
31	8	"Hunting Season"	December 27, 2014
Larry suspects his wife, Tammy, of cheating on him, and things come to a head during a high-stakes hunting trip that leaves one of them dead and lands the other behind bars.
32	9	"No Accident"	January 3, 2015
High school baseball coach Russell Stager's marriage to Barbara ends in a betrayal that will push one of them over the edge.
33	10	"The Devil Inside"	January 10, 2015
In Akron, Ohio, Tony Smith murders common-law wife Lilius Landrum in an especially gruesome way, horrifying the people who knew the good-hearted woman.
34	11	"Bloody Matrimony"	January 17, 2015
Pressure builds in the marriage of Steve and Cathy Dingle until it explode into infidelity, violence and murder.
35	12	"Broken Dreams"	January 24, 2015
The marriage of Keith Belajonas and Christina Corrigan-Belajonas ends in a shocking act of violence that impacts their young children.
36	13	"Death In Vegas"	January 31, 2015
Long-buried secrets cause John and Evie Watson's marriage to crumble after 25 years, and it comes to a violent end in a Las Vegas hotel room.

=== Season 4 (2015-2016) ===
No. overall	No. in season	Title	Original release date
37	1	"You Only Die Once"	October 10, 2015
When wild-child Kim falls for a paragon of stability, Frank, it is a case of opposites being attracted to each other, then their attraction turns fatal.
38	2	"Crazy Love"	October 17, 2015
Former high school sweethearts Pamela and Michael fall back in love after 20 years apart, but their second chance at love turns deadly.
39	3	"Country Killer"	October 24, 2015
Rodeo star Matt Allen finds comfort in the arms of Elsie Wells, then she meets his best friend, and they all land in a whole heap of trouble.
40	4	"Jaws of Death"	October 31, 2015
Charlie and Christine search for a simpler life in Vermont, then a terrible car crash exposes complicated secrets that turn deadly.
41	5	"Murder In Store"	November 7, 2015
Jerry Barker falls for Rebecca after the death of his first wife; they open a general store, but the shelf life on their happiness is short-lived.
42	6	"Collision Course"	November 14, 2015
Mike is a master mechanic whose courtship with Ellen is fast and furious, but their union is on a collision course with tragedy.
43	7	"Second Chance at Death"	November 21, 2015
After falling in love at their 10-year high school reunion, money troubles cause Antoinette and Spencer's marriage to flounder with tragic consequences.
44	8	"The Harder They Fall"	November 28, 2015
Tom and Juanita Richardson's second honeymoon ends with a deadly fall from a cliff overlooking Lake Superior.
45	9	"Death Brawl"	December 5, 2015
A handsome U.S. Marine lands the woman of his dreams, but the pressures of a long-distance relationship push these newlyweds to the edge.
46	10	"Fall From Grace"	December 12, 2015
David Bush believes his wife, Lynn, has left him because of his infidelities, and he doesn't report her missing until the day after she disappears, never to be see again.
47	11	"Sex, Lies and Secret Texts"	December 19, 2015
When free-spirited bartender Cassie meets family-guy Brent, the spark is intense, but it is doomed to explode and end with the snuffing out of a bright light.
48	12	"Murder in the Cards"	December 26, 2015
A blackjack habit leads to tragedy for Gary and Helen, landing one of them behind bars and the other six feet under.
49	13	"At Death's Door"	January 2, 2016
Millionaire aerospace executives Lynn and Manfred Schockner hide a twisted rage that ends in a deadly conspiracy.

=== Season 5 (2017) ===
No. overall	No. in season	Title	Original release date
50	1	"Second Chance at Death"	May 13, 2017
While mourning the death of his wife, Julian falls hard for his much-younger coworker, Teresa; for a time, Teresa's spunk lifts Julian's spirits until a sordid affair plunges him into an abyss.
51	2	"Love in Flames"	May 20, 2017
Janice thinks Brett is an old-fashioned country boy who needs a woman's touch, while Brett thinks Janice is the ideal woman to turn his house into a home; as family tragedies mount, their dream of a perfect life together soon goes up in flames.
52	3	"Blood and Sand"	May 27, 2017
California beauty Pegye meets volleyball player Eric in Newport Beach, Calif.; with good looks and success, the couple appears to have it all, but hedonism comes at a price, and their dream life quickly becomes a waking nightmare.
53	4	"Rookie Mistake"	June 3, 2017
Carli marries a police officer who takes his role as protector a little too seriously; Carli attempts to break free from the confines of wedlock, setting off a chain of deadly events.
54	5	"Recipe for Death"	June 10, 2017
Eric gives up the U.S. Marines to follow his dream as a baker, and falls for Constance on a blind date; these two "foodies" indulge in the sweet life until a seven-year itch is scratched by murder.
55	6	"Murder in the Marina"	June 17, 2017
Ed is a retired pilot whose sense of adventure is reawakened by a seaside encounter with the much-younger Denise, then the couple's idyllic life on a boat in a Florida marina is rocked by a sudden change in their fortune.
56	7	"Hell on Earth"	June 24, 2017
A minister's son, Luther, falls hard for Anita, the daughter of a pastor; then, failure delivers a crushing blow to their relationship, turning their heavenly life into hell on Earth.
57	8	"Reduced to Ash"	July 1, 2017
After 35 years together, longtime partners Julie and Keith become restless and begin to pursue very private adventures, reducing their once fiery love to ash.
58	9	"Deadly Obsession"	July 8, 2017
Tom and Lynette's love story spans decades from grade school to a posh house with a pool, but dark secrets from the bedroom bleed into other aspects of their marriage, and a dangerous obsession shreds their relationship into pieces.
59	10	"The Ties That Bind"	July 15, 2017
In Jonesboro, Ark., Michelle and Marc's marriage ends in murder as a result of family ties that snap and break.
60	11	"A Thin Blue Line"	July 22, 2017
High school sweethearts Linda and Derrick Yancey become sheriff's deputies with a picture-perfect marriage, then their marriage degenerates into a tale of good cop/bad cop ending in murder with one of them on the run.
61	12	"Drowining in Tears"	July 29, 2017
When Tim meets Maryann at a Catholic mixer, it's a match made in heaven, but while the future looks bright, a dark cloud gathers on the horizon in the person of Tim's ex-wife.
62	13	"Death Knows No Borders"	August 12, 2017
Worlds collide when Donald and Umi fall in love in Indonesia; while Umi strives to become the perfect American woman in Don's native Kentucky, he longs for something or someone more exotic.

=== Season 6 (2018) ===
No. overall	No. in season	Title	Original release date
63	1	"A Watery Grave"	August 11, 2018
Jeff and Jeanine Glanda have a picture-perfect family until selfishness and a shameless affair mark the beginning of the end; as money troubles and the threat of divorce breed paranoia and hate, a plot is hatched in the dark heart of a killer.
64	2	"Behind Closed Doors"	August 18, 2018
Nurses Lara Crockett and Ricardo Muscolino meet on the night shift; he sets about creating a rich life for them, and she's happy to go along with it; Ricardo's scheming eventually drives Lara into the arms of another man with explosive results.
65	3	"Love Gone Bankrupt"	August 25, 2018
After Gary and Pam Triano's marriage comes to an end, shady business deals, a series of betrayals and an extremely bitter custody battle lead to a climax that is nothing short of explosive.
66	4	"The Bad Apple"	September 1, 2018
Francis Nicky Nicolosi and his devout new wife, Ellie, are living out the perfect retirement, then one of them is found dead in an apple orchard; police discover there's more to this seemingly frail and religious couple than anyone imagined.
67	5	"Everybody Loves Rick"	September 8, 2018
Most high school romances end in heartbreak; however, Richard and Jolena rekindle their romance years later even though one of them is already married, and someone in this love triangle will wind up dead.
68	6	"Ambition to Die For"	September 15, 2018
Longtime married couple Dino and Clara run a successful bail bond company, but when Dino's long hours and a missing bail jumper make Clara suspicious and nervous, a hidden secret emerges that makes their bond come undone in the blink of an eye.
69	7	"Murder, Modesty, and the Pastor"	September 22, 2018
Corinne Stoudt gets a second chance at love with husband Calvin, then a too-close roommate and a monstrous past turns this second chance into a deadly battleground.
70	8	"Curtain Call to Hell"	September 29, 2018
Young and in love, Stephanie and Daniel Politte are happily balancing work and play; before long, tensions arise due to disappointment, self-loathing and a mutual affection for the bottle, and, by the final curtain call, only one of them is left standing.
71	9	"Death Outranks Love"	October 6, 2018
It's a military match made in heaven for Roger and Margorie, but a tangled web of financial secrets and twisted lies ruins the young couple's future; while the rise of their careers and romance seems meteoric, the ensuing fall is deadly.
72	10	"Living With the Devil"	October 20, 2018
When Darren and Elizabeth marry eight weeks after meeting, no one thinks it's a good idea, but the couple just doesn't care; then, one of them gets attacked, and a sniper is spotted across the way.
73	11	"Deceitful Secrets"	October 27, 2018
Cecil and Larlane Brown have been together for years, but their secrets and lies, ignored and neglected for decades, threaten to turn their 50-year relationship into a bloody battleground.
74	12	"Sins of the Heart"	November 3, 2018
Young, rich and religious, John and Nikki Hillrich fall in love at college; when desire collides with faith, secret lives marked by sinful liaisons and menacing new friends shatter their perfect life.
75	13	"Bored to Death"	November 10, 2018
When Opal Skidmore marries Steven Williams, their love is a second chance for the pair to live out their dreams; soon, boredom and the lure of the open road spark hidden desires and sexual hijinks, leaving this open marriage anything but happy.

=== Season 7 (2020) ===
No. overall	No. in season	Title	Original release date
76	1	"Murder Behind the Gates"	February 3, 2020
Pad is rich and handsome, and Kem is popular but from the wrong side of town; the power couple stick it out despite disapproval, and over the years amass a fortune; however, they soon learn that their money can't buy love and happiness -only death.
77	2	"Honkytonk Killer"	February 10, 2020
Shorty and Cotton seem perfect for each other; they love dancing, motorcycles and each other, but looks can be deceiving and after an accident reveals a life of lies and deceit, one of them will dance with the devil to the death.
78	3	"Lethal Romance"	February 21, 2020
An ambitious Harlem couple dreams of a better life for themselves, but stuck in a bitter cycle of poverty, poor health and mistrust, one of them decides to put their dreams to rest forever.
79	4	"Hell on Wheels"	February 28, 2020
Charlene attracts more than one man with her beauty and one by one they all go crazy vying for her love; love may be heavenly, but for some it can be hell.
80	5	"Some Like it Dead"	March 6, 2020
Everyone is happy when Mirinda marries Sam because she's pretty and he's cute and friendly, but Mirinda's spending veers out of control and tears the couple apart until one of them looks outside the marriage and finds nothing short of murder.
81	6	"No Harmony in Polyamory"	March 13, 2020
Rebecca Murray falls for Lee Mikael Cawthon and soon exotic dancer Allite Franks and best friend, Thad join the relationship as a third and fourth partner, but this open-minded foursome soon discovers there's no harmony in polyamory.
82	7	"The Unholy Affair"	March 20, 2020
Life for Alabama newlyweds Syble and Earnie revolves around church and family, but a freak accident and a pair of wandering eyes threaten to drive this couple into an unholy trinity of betrayal, infidelity and murder.
83	8	"My Way or the Dead Way"	March 20, 2020
Jodie is Edgar's secret high school crush; after a chance meeting, the two get together quickly, but money trouble, jealousy and a rebellious stepdaughter are about to turn this second chance at love into the high school reunion from hell.
84	9	"Deadly Isolation"	March 20, 2020
Chad and Jo meet by chance and to this pair of free spirits, their connection feels cosmic; they fall in love and move far from everyone they know; but soon their new life is ripped apart by jealous ex-partners.
85	10	"Flirting with Murder"	March 27, 2020
When Trichele and Brian promise to stick it out for better or for worse, they have no idea how worse things will get.
86	11	"To Kiss or to Kill"	April 3, 2020
April and Brad are happily married until her dreams of having a baby fall apart; April turns to other men for consolation; one even moves in with the couple; when Brad is ultimately replaced as the man of the house, everyone pays a price.
87	12	"Betting on Murder"	April 6, 2020
Gail and Stephen Dews have it all: a happy marriage, a beautiful house and healthy children, but a family tragedy and a gambling addiction rips their lives to shreds, proving that nothing is what it seems.
88	13	"Opposites can Kill"	April 20, 2020
Young single mom Kathy wants a good life for herself and her son, but their dreams clash with wannabe rapper Juan; tempers erupt when Kathy decides she wants more out of life, no matter the cost.
