= Young Robin Hood =

- Genre: Adventure
- Written by: Cheryl Blakeney; Mary Crawford; Peter Landecker; Alan Templeton; Patrick Granleese; Thor Bishopric; Randy Lofficier
- Directed by: Bernard Freimovitz; Peter Sander
- Voices of: Thor Bishopric; Sonja Ball; Anik Matern; Bronwen Mantel; Kathleen Fee; Michael O'Reilly; Jessalyn Gilsig; Michael Rudder; Mark Hellman; Terrence Scammell; A.J. Henderson; Harry Standjofski; Liz MacRae; Walter Massey; Rick Jones; Johni Keyworth
- Composer: Leon Aronson
- Countries of origin: Canada; France; United States
- Original languages: English; French
- No. of seasons: 2
- No. of episodes: 26

Production
- Executive producers: Micheline Charest; Jean Cazes; Christopher Izard; David Kirschner
- Producers: Ronald A. Weinberg; Christian Davin
- Editor: Nathalie Rossin
- Running time: 26 minutes
- Production companies: H-B Production Co. (Note: Animation outsourced to Fil-Cartoons, Sae Rom Productions and Big Star Enterprises.); CINAR Films; France Animation

Original release
- Network: Syndication
- Release: 15 September – 8 December 1991

Young Robin Hood is an animated series produced for television by H-B Production Co., CINAR and France Animation and aired in syndication in 1991. It ran for one season as part of the Sunday-morning programming block, The Funtastic World of Hanna-Barbera (1985–94). The show takes place when Robin Hood is a teenager, Richard the Lion Heart is on his "first crusade" and Robin's father, the Earl of Huntington, joins him. Young Robin Hood was Hanna-Barbera's second adaptation of the legend of Robin Hood, after their 1972 television special The Adventures of Robin Hoodnik.

== Synopsis ==
Robin Hood quickly finds himself at odds with the establishment; the Sheriff of Nottingham and Prince John, and creates a camp in Sherwood forest with other youngsters, the only girl, Marian, is a ward of the sheriff and spy for Robin. The main thing about Robin's youth in this case, is that his plans do not always work and he is occasionally questioned because of his youth, the fact that he is a known criminal and has no legal guardian to vouch for him.

== Characters ==
- Robin Hood (voiced by Thor Bishopric) – the boy in the county with a bow. He rarely is beaten by other archers. As a nobleman, he understands Latin, and has a tame hawk called Arrow, who is used to pass messages between him and Marian.
- Little John (voiced by Terrence Scammell) – a blacksmith's son. Typically one of Robin's most loyal followers, but is not above criticizing Robin's plans.
- Alan-a-Dale (voiced by Michael O'Reilly) – a very young, romantic minstrel.
- Will Scarlet (voiced by Sonja Ball) – a young, talented thief, who idolizes Robin. He is a technical talent and creates traps and machines.
- Brother Tuck (voiced by Harry Standjofski) – a very young monk, sometimes questioning his choice being an outlaw. He is very pious and speaks Latin every now and then.
- Marian (voiced by Anik Matern) – Robin's sweetheart and a ward at Nottingham, sometimes suspected of conspiring with him.
- Haggala (voiced by Bronwen Mantel) – a kind-hearted sorceress whose spells don't always work. She has a cat named Miranda.
- Prince John (voiced by Michael Rudder) – spoiled boy who whines about who should be king. Sometimes tries to usurp Richard but the attempts are thwarted by Robin, or John's own ineptitude.
- Sheriff of Nottingham (voiced by A.J. Henderson) – a harsh man and good swordsman.
- Gilbert of Gisbourn (voiced by Mark Hellman) – lieutenant to the sheriff and has a crush on Marian. He often tries to win her over and Marian uses it to get information. He has a dog named Bruno.
- Gertrude of Griswald (voiced by Jessalyn Gilsig) – The sister of Gilbert.

== Production ==
The series was a joint American-Canadian-French production of Hanna-Barbera, CINAR and France Animation and Antenne-2 in partnership with the Global Television Network, the Family Channel, Centre National De La Cinématographie and Sofica Cofimage 3. The animation is produced by France Animation and Crayon Animation, while the overseas production services were handled by Fil-Cartoons (subsidiary of Hanna-Barbera) in the Philippines, and two studios in South Korea: Sae Rom Productions and Big Star Enterprises.

== Broadcast ==
Teletoon aired the series in Canada in 1998.

== Home media ==
In late 1991, Hanna-Barbera Home Video released three of the series' episodes individually on VHS: "The Wild Boar of Sherwood", "The Viking Treasure", and "The King of the Outlaws". There are currently no plans for the complete series to be released on DVD.

== See also ==
- List of films and television series featuring Robin Hood
