= Bobobobs =

Franchise of Spanish children's stories by Henk and Nerida Zwart

- Title screen of original Bobobobs opening
- Also known as: Los Bobobobs
- Genre: Animation, children's
- Created by: Henk Zwart and Nerida Zwart with BRB Internacional
- Directed by: Tim Reid
- Voices of: Walter Massey; Rick Jones; Andrew Bednarski; Michael Rudder; Kathleen Fee; Richard Dumont; Bronwen Mantel; A.J. Henderson; Paul Zakaib; Mark Hellman
- Narrated by: Dean Hagopian
- Composers: Music by: Guido & Maurizio De Angelis lyrics by: Ted Mather; performed by: Rita Irasena and Emilio Aragon
- Country of origin: Spain
- Original language: Catalan
- No. of series: 2
- No. of episodes: 26

Production
- Running time: 24 minutes
- Production companies: BRB Internacional; TV3

Original release
- Network: TV3
- Release: 1988 – 1989

Bobobobs (/ˌboʊboʊˈbɒbz/ BOH-boh-BOBZ) is a series of fictional children's stories created by Henk Zwart and Nerida Zwart. The Bobobobs consists of several illustrated books and comics, and an animation children's television series produced in 1988. The Bobobobs stories were originally published by Standaard Uitgeverij in Belgium, with later animation and merchandising produced by BRB Internacional in Spain.

The Bobobobs animated children's television series is based upon the characters and stories created and written by Henk Zwart and Nerida Zwart. It was directed by Tim Reid and produced by the Spanish company BRB Internacional, who produced other animated shows such as Around the World with Willy Fog, Dogtanian and the Three Muskehounds and The World of David the Gnome during the 1980s. The television series, consisting of 26 episodes, was subsequently dubbed into English by Cinelume, with the participation of Telefilm Canada as well as being dubbed into Hungarian, Italian, Catalan, Dutch, Afrikaans and German. The English tune, with a length of over two minutes, was composed by Guido & Maurizio de Angelis, while the lyrics were written by Ted Mather and performed by Rita Irasena and Emilio Aragon.

The series is set on the distant past, and depicts nomadic extraterrestrial humanoids which are heading towards planet Earth on a spaceship resembling a galleon. They plan to rescue prehistoric humans from supposedly dangerous dinosaurs. The series is loosely based on the concept of ancient astronauts.

== Plot ==
Set in the distant past, the plot revolves around a group of nomadic miniature extraterrestrial humanoids known as the Bobobobs, who live in a part of the universe far away from the planet Earth. One crew of these Bobobobs, led by Bob Wouter, the captain, sets sail in the Bobular Quest, their spaceship, described as a "galleon with a protective dome".

The crew head towards Earth where they plan to save the humans from being terrorised by dinosaurs. Along the way they encounter a variety of different alien species, some of which are hostile, and use their psychic powers, such as their ability to become invisible and to teleport, to aid them.

== Merchandise ==
In several countries, Bobobobs merchandise was produced, including tie-in books, and episodes of the series were released in both PAL and NTSC formats of VHS.

== Availability ==
Episodes of the Bobobobs in English and Spanish can be watched online on the official YouTube channel of BRB Entertainment. In 2012 BRB Entertainment made the entire Bobobobs series available for streaming in English on their official website.

== Characters ==
- Bob Wouter is the kindly, level-headed Bob (Captain) of the Bobular Quest with a wooden leg. He has the enormous task of leading his Bobobobs on their adventurous journey through the universe to a newly discovered planet (Earth).
- Little Wouter (Little Bob) is Bob Wouter's son. He is a clever little boy, smarter than a lot of the Bobobobs think. He is Blip's best friend.
- Blush (Blip) is Cornelius' mascot and eternal companion. He is a floating fuzzy purple head with little arms and big friendly eyes.
- Cornelius is the Bobular's chief astronomer. He is very old, has a long white beard and wears purple clothes and a purple wizard's hat. He is extremely wise, but because he is old he often nods off to sleep leaving Peter, his assistant, to do most of his work.
- Willbur is the son of the Bobobobs great leader, Big Bob, and Petronella's brother. He is the Bobular's not-so-handy handyman.
- Petronella is Big Bob's daughter who thinks that she can order everyone around. She is mean to those around her, with the exception of her brother Willbur, and is constantly thinking of her own (non-existent) beauty. She is married to A.D.
- A.D. is the Bobobob's architect and Petronella's hen-pecked husband who absorbs himself into his work.
- Fritz is the temperamental cook. His food is nourishing but tastes terrible. He loses his temper with anyone he disagrees with, especially Aunt Agatha. His best friends are Ein & Stein.
- Aunt Agatha is everybody's auntie. She sneaked aboard to look after her nephew Peter, but quickly became everyone's friend, especially Cornelius's. She is a kindly old lady who does a lot of much-loved baking.
- Ein & Stein are the Bobular's biologists. They are identical twins and never leave each other's side. Their main task is growing "Obus" plants for the Bobular Quest's crew. Although they tend to argue on a regular basis, they care for each other deeply.
- Peter is Cornelius' assistant whose ambition is to be chief astronomer one day, but he has a lot to learn and Blip, Cornelius' little mate, doesn't make it easier for him.
- Doc Bone is the Bobular's doctor who's a bit absent minded and has more eyes for Nurse Mimi than for his patients.
- Nurse Mimi is Doc Bone's sweet young nurse. She is always ready to help those in need, especially Willbur.
- Big Bob is the Bobobobs leader, and father of Petronella and Willbur.

== Episodes ==
=== Series 1 (1988) ===
#	Title	Plot
1	Bobobobs	Whilst sailing around space, Cornelius sees the far away Earth in his telescope where the dinosaurs are terrorising the Bobs. He organises a meeting of all the Bobs, led by their King, Big Bob. The consul agrees that the Bobular Quest should set off for Earth. On the way, they stop off for a picnic on a planet, where they are attacked by two cyclops but they manage to escape.
2	A Queen in the Swamp	The Bobular Quest is captured by giant vines, and an away team composed of the Captain, Little Bob, and Willbur, travel down to the planet, which is inhabited by giant frogs. It turns out that the true queen Croakadillia has been usurped by the evil Queen Toadella, who is using her ant army to keep control. Toadella captures the captain and Willbur and plans to eat them for dinner unless the Bobs can overthrow her and rescue them in time.
3	The Demon of the Universe	The Bobs crash land on a planet inhabited by monsters, and only Cornelius can save them from the most dangerous of them all—a "hairy hermit" called the demon of the universe who curses the crew and takes over Cornelius's body. Cornelius eventually casts the demon out and with help from the crew he burns him into the depths of space with a giant fireball.
4	Blip Goes Home	Blip has vivid nightmares of his parents being swallowed up by fire. He returns to his home planet only to find out that a severe food shortage has led the formerly friendly Munchums to kidnap Blip's parents. The Bobobobs provide the planet with ample food and set both Blip's parents and the kidnappers free.
5	Birthday	Cornelius turns 1000 and feels neglected by the crew, who are only pretending to neglect him until his surprise party at the end.
6	The Disguise (*)	The Bobs run into some octopus-like space creatures.
7	Tree Monster	
8	Little Wouter's New Friends (*)	While fishing over the side of the ship, Little Bob catches two little critters called gubbies. He takes them as pets, but soon they begin causing havoc everywhere, eating all the food and gnawing at the wood. The innocent Blip is blamed, but eventually the real culprits are discovered. The Bobs turn themselves into giants using their special powers and scare away the gubbies.
9	The Spacecombers	A pair of alien space-combers, the brothers Lest and Pest, come aboard, much to the dismay of Petronella, who ends up in the bathtub with them.
10	Call for Help (*)	A dirty ship arrives wishing to trade with the Bobular Quest, but their true intentions are revealed when it is discovered that they want to take over the Bobular Quest.
11	Mummy comes to visit (*)	An alien ship (which resembles a flying saucer) tries to capture the Bobular Quest.
12	The Fall of Fritz	Fritz gets into an altercation with Petronella which resolves in Fritz falling down the stairs. After his fall he becomes kind and decides to let Aunt Agatha take over the kitchen. After getting hit in the head again, Fritz turns back into his normal mean tempered self, and the crew is happy again.
13	The Puffy Pink Space Spook	Crew members report seeing ghosts aboard the ship but their worries are dismissed by Cornelius. After more and more sightings, the ghost is revealed to be the very dangerous Puffy pink space monster. The Bobs finally gang together, and after drinking a blue potion that turns them into similar pink ghosts, terrify their enemy, who promptly explodes.

(*) Broadcast in a different order in some countries.

=== Series 2 (1989) ===
#	Title	Plot
14	No Escape	
15	The Tripuses	
16	Fitness Training (1)	
17	Fitness Training (2)	
18	The Tree People	The Bobular runs out of water when A.D.s water making invention is destroyed by Ein and Stein, so the Bobular Quest travels to a planet with abundant water. Once there, Little Bob is declared King by the natives (who live in trees) while the other Bobs worry that he has been kidnapped.
19	A sticky situation	
20	Fritz the Painter	When Fritz's food is insulted again (this time his soup that is described as glue), he decides to become an artist and give up his life of cooking. All night he stays up painting abstract art only to find a very hungry crew the next morning.
21	Treasure Hunt	The crew find a treasure map floating around space in a giant bottle. Despite some people's warnings, an expedition is set up to find the treasure, but after arriving on the barren wasteland planet, the expedition team end up being captured by giant pirates on a deserted planet. The pirates had sent out the map to lure space travellers to their planet, where the pirates plan to eat them. The Bobs finally escape but don't get the pirate's treasure.
22	The Storm	A huge storm hits the Bobular, damaging its windows, and severely injuring the captain. The Bobs stop off on an asteroid to make some new windows, but on the asteroid, Willbur gets a crack on the head bringing on amnesia and he is abducted by a giant crab whom he assumes is his mother. Petronella leads a rescue expedition and succeeds. Whilst leaving the asteroid, the Bobs notice that a meteor is headed for it, and shall destroy both it and the giant crab, so they use their powers to divert the meteor away, saving the crab.
23	The Search Party	
24	The Clubbers (Part 1)	The Bobular heads through an ice field, and an expedition sets off to find a safe way through.
25	The Clubbers (Part 2)	The expedition finds a vicious race of little furry creatures on the icebergs who are bullying a much larger furry creature.
26	The Settlement of Trotterland	The Bobular is arriving to a planet where there is a Bobobob settlement called "Trotterland" and Bob Wouter is excited because his daughter, Susu, is about to be married there. They are all surprised when they see that nobody is there to welcome them. Susu finally arrives and explains that all the natives are being kept captive by aliens who have landed on the planet and driven them from their villages down into the mines to dig for energy stones.

== Voice actors and their characters ==
- Walter Massey as Bob Wouter
- Rick Jones as Cornelius/Blip
- Dean Hagopian as Narrator
- Andrew Bednarski as Little Bob
- Michael Rudder as Willbur/Fritz
- Kathleen Fee as Petronella
- Richard Dumont as A.D.
- Bronwen Mantel as Aunt Agatha/Nurse Mimi
- A.J. Henderson as Ein/Doc Bone
- Paul Zacaib as Stein
- Mark Hellman as Peter
