= Future Block =

- Directed by: Kevin McCracken
- Written by: Kevin McCracken
- Produced by: David Verrall
- Starring: Maury Chaykin; Walter Massey; Kathleen Fee; Wally Martin
- Music by: Normand Roger
- Animation by: Kevin McCracken
- Production company: National Film Board of Canada
- Release date: 1987
- Running time: 10 minutes
- Country: Canada
- Language: English

Future Block is a Canadian animated short film, directed by Kevin McCracken and released in 1987. A critique of advancing automation, the film centres on a man who is frustrated by the depersonalized service he is receiving at a bank that has been fully computerized and has no human staff left.

The film's voice cast includes Maury Chaykin, Walter Massey, Kathleen Fee and Wally Martin.

The film was a Genie Award nominee for Best Theatrical Short Film at the 9th Genie Awards in 1988.
