= Cosmic Cowboys =

- Genre: Animated series Science fiction comedy Surreal comedy
- Created by: Jan Van Rijsselberge (credited as Eddy Marx)
- Voices of: Rick Jones; Danny Wells; Kathleen Fee
- Music by: Steve Wener
- Countries of origin: France; Canada; Italy
- No. of seasons: 1
- No. of episodes: 52

Production
- Executive producers: Christian Davin; Clement Calvet
- Running time: 13 minutes
- Production companies: Alphanim; Rai Fiction; Europool; Agogo Media; Gruppo Alcuni; LuxAnimation; Les Productions Tooncan; Sofica France Télévision Images 2

Original release
- Network: France 3 (France); VRAK.TV (Quebec)
- Release: January 24 – June 26, 2004

Cosmic Cowboys is a French-Canadian animated series consisting of 52 episodes, each 13 minutes long. It was created by Jan Van Rijsselberge (credited as Eddy Marx) and directed by Hugo Gittard, François Rosso, and Laurent Nicolas. The series was a co-production between Alphanim, France 3, Les Productions Tooncan, Rai Fiction, Europool, Agogo Media, Gruppo Alcuni, LuxAnimation, and Sofica France Télévision Images 2.

In Quebec, the series premiered on VRAK.TV on January 4, 2004, which aired the full run of 52 episodes. In France, it aired from January 24, 2004, to June 26, 2004, on France 3 during the T03 programming block, though only 20 of the 52 episodes were broadcast during this initial run.

== Characters ==
- Curtis (voiced by Rick Jones) is a lazy, blue cat-goat mutant who frequently ignores the rules to do things his own way. He enjoys lounging on the Saloon sofa, watching TV, and eating junk food. However, he is quite resourceful and creative when the situation calls for it.
- Dook (voiced by Danny Wells) is a green buffalo. Unlike Curtis, he is disciplined, responsible, and thinks before he acts.
- Granny (voiced by Kathleen Fee) is the boss of Curtis and Dook. She informs them of criminals spreading panic throughout the universe. She has a low opinion of the pair, viewing them as incompetent and frequently scolding them for the trouble they cause.
- Cereal Bob (voiced by Rick Jones) is a pink rabbit and the Cowboys' arch-nemesis. He constantly plots to dominate the universe and views Curtis and Dook as idiots. He has a severe temper; if anyone calls him "cute", he flies into a schizophrenic rage and attacks the person who "insulted" him.

== Episodes ==
No.	Title	Written by	Directed by	Original release date	Prod. code
1	"The Cereal Brothers" "Céréal Bros"	François Deon; Stéphane Beau	François Rosso; Laurent Nicolas	January 24, 2004	101
A prison at night: under the spotlights and sirens, a prisoner manages to escape. It's the infamous Mickey-the-Maniac! Surprise! At the controls of the escape ship is Cereal Bob… Mickey's little brother! The one to whom he undoubtedly owes everything when it comes to crime. The Cosmic team is on high alert; they're tracking a formidable duo. But Mickey isn't exactly gentle with his little brother, whom he clearly underestimates…
2	"Vacation Drill" "Le break"	Alex Donaro; Vincent Dubost	François Rosso; Hugo Gittard	January 31, 2004	102
Cereal Bob is one worn out criminal: a little vacation would do him some good. He finds a deserted mobile home and takes some well deserved R & R. Meanwhile, Curtis is finding Dook's nagging increasingly difficult to bear and decides to take a break. Imagine Cereal Bob's surprise when Curtis moves into the big house across from his caravan and turns out to be a noisy and unreasonable neighbour!
3	"Luck Out Below" "Chacun sa chance"	Jean de Loriol; Alain Ussel; Christophe Ollivier	François Rosso; Hugo Gittard	February 7, 2004	103
Curtis ordered a lucky ring. The ring immediately brings him luck, but despite the mounting evidence, Dook remains skeptical. A call from Granny sends them to escort a convoy of plutarium (a substance as unstable as nitro-glycerine) to an oxygen plant that supplies the planet Vega. But of course, Cereal Bob is not far away, with a vicious scheme to destroy the factory and deprive the entire planet of oxygen.
4	"Cosmics in the Blizzard" "Les Cosmic dans le blizzard"	Alex Donaro; François Rosso	François Rosso; Laurent Nicolas	February 14, 2004	104
Dook and Curtis are sent by Granny to Planet Blizzard, a small planet made of ice. The planet's inhabitants have noticed a strange pink prowler in the northern region. Naturally, it's Cereal Bob who, using methods that would do a global criminal organization proud (thousands of networked electric heaters), is trying to melt the ice covering the planet!
5	"Cereal Christmas" "Céréal christmas"	Jean-Louis Capron; Vincent Paronnaud; Vincent Dubost	François Rosso; Laurent Nicolas	February 21, 2004	105
It's Christmas Eve and Cereal Bob has sent hundreds of Bob look-alike androids on the loose, spreading panic and fear throughout the galaxy's homes. The Cosmic Cowboys discover that the clones come from Planet Christmas, where Santa Claus lives.
6	"Spaced-Out Momma!" "Yah mamma"	François Rosso; Vincent Dubost	François Rosso; Hugo Gittard	February 28, 2004	106
Curtis's mom shows up unexpectedly at the saloon. It only takes two minutes for him to remember how difficult she can be, especially when she starts reminiscing about stories of his childhood. She then knits ridiculous sweaters that Dook and Curtis are forced to wear so as not to hurt her feelings. Meanwhile, on a nearby planet, Cereal Bob is busy hypnotizing his victims.
7	"Twiddle Dee Dumb" "L'embuscade"	Frank Ekinci; Stéphane Beau	François Rosso; Hugo Gittard	March 6, 2004	107
Bob goes absolutely ballistic after a bad experience at the gas station, but is defeated by the Cowboys. Fed up, he uses mind-control on Granny, sending them off on a mission to one of Bob's homemade planets, which is nothing but one big pinball machine.
8	"Star-Strangled Banter" "L'inspection"	François Deon; Fred Mintoff	François Rosso; Hugo Gittard	March 13, 2004	108
9	"Hot Dog Bob" "Hot dog"	Sébastien Dejardin; Vincent Dubost	François Rosso; Hugo Gittard	March 20, 2004	109
10	"The Pig Escape" "Snout city"	Sébastien Allegret; François Rosso	François Rosso; Hugo Gittard	March 27, 2004	110
11	"Good Lux Charm" "Fées du logis"	Baptiste Heidrich; Julien Monthiel; Fred Mintoff	François Rosso; Hugo Gittard	April 3, 2004	111
12	"A Shrinking World" "C'est nul !"	Jean de Loriol; Alain Ussel; François Rosso	François Rosso; Hugo Gittard	May 1, 2004	112
13	"Ecomaniac" "Ecolodook"	Luc Lefebvre; Stéphane Beau	François Rosso; Hugo Gittard	May 8, 2004	113
14	"A Mysterious Tale" "Histoire de boule"	Luc Lefebvre; Gregory Woronchuk	François Rosso; Hugo Gittard	May 15, 2004	114
15	"Momocop"	François Deon; Marc-Antoine Sauvillers	François Rosso; Hugo Gittard	May 22, 2004	115
16	"Grabbit and Run!" "Incroyable Appolonus"	Hadrien Soulez-Lariviere; Fred Mintoff	François Rosso; Hugo Gittard	May 29, 2004	116
17	"Liar's Lair" "Magouille et compagnie !"	Sébastien Dejardin; Mauro Calasese	François Rosso; Hugo Gittard	June 5, 2004	117
18	"Space Fan-atic" "Fan jusqu'au bout des dents"	Baptiste Heidrich; Julien Monthiel; Stéphane Beau	François Rosso; Hugo Gittard	June 12, 2004	118
19	"Friend or Fiend?" "Histoire de confiance"	Hadrien Soulez-Lariviere; François Rosso	François Rosso; Hugo Gittard	June 19, 2004	119
20	"Malicious Malicia" "Malicieuse Malicia"	Julien Monthiel; Denis Doucet	François Rosso; Hugo Gittard	June 26, 2004	120
21	"Space Castaways" "Les Robinsons de l'espace"	Vincent Paronnaud; Jean-Louis Momus; Fred Mintoff	François Rosso; Hugo Gittard	TBA	121
22	"Trading Spaces" "Vieille pétoire et naphtaline"	Baptiste Heidrich; Marc-Antoine Sauvillers	François Rosso; Hugo Gittard	TBA	122
23	"Cosmic Clowns" "Quel cirque !"	Manon Berthelet; Muguette Berthelet; Vincent Dubost	François Rosso; Hugo Gittard	TBA	123
24	"Debt or Alive" "Curtis règle ses dettes"	Bruno Tolande; Sylvain Lavoie	François Rosso; Hugo Gittard	TBA	124
25	"Abracadabra-Bob!" "Potions abracadabrantes"	Baptiste Heidrich; Stéphane Beau	François Rosso; Hugo Gittard	TBA	125
In his ongoing quest to rule the universe, Bob turns to a sleazy charlatan, who sells him all sorts of so-called magic-formula potions. But the results aren't exactly what Bob expected. The potions transform Bob into a more disturbed psychopath than he already is. Bob goes completely ballistic and prepares to unleash his evil wrath using the dreaded potions. The Cowboys soon find themselves dealing with a weirder Bob than they're accustomed to.
26	"Pumpkin Dispatch" "Un potiron providentiel"	Manon Berthelet; Muguette Berthelet; Vincent Dubost	François Rosso; Hugo Gittard	TBA	126
27	"Superguy"	Alex Donaro; Marc-Antoine Sauvillers	François Rosso; Hugo Gittard	TBA	127
28	"Split Poisonality" "Somnambob"	John Handforth; Fred Mintoff	François Rosso; Hugo Gittard	TBA	128
29	"Cosmic Cast" "Le plâtre"	Yves-Noël François; Sylvain Lavoie	François Rosso; Hugo Gittard	TBA	129
30	"Diploma Dilemma" "L'examen"	Hadrien Soulez-Lariviere; Marc-Antoine Sauvillers	François Rosso; Hugo Gittard	TBA	130
31	"Spatial Agent" "Mouton noir, lapin rose"	Sébastien Dejardin; Mauro Calasese	François Rosso; Hugo Gittard	TBA	131
32	"Flying Rodeo Cowboy" "Rocket Rodéo"	Andrew Benner; Denis Doucet	François Rosso; Hugo Gittard	TBA	132
33	"Boxing Day" "Chaos technique"	Manon Berthelet; Muguette Berthelet; Stéphane Beau	François Rosso; Hugo Gittard	TBA	133
34	"The Ties That Blind!" "Les yeux pas en face des trous"	Sébastien Dejardin; Vincent Paronnaud; Jean-Louis Momus; Vincent Dubost	François Rosso; Hugo Gittard	TBA	134
35	"Galactic Voodoo" "Vaudou galactique"	Jono Howard; Marc-Antoine Sauvillers	François Rosso; Hugo Gittard	TBA	135
36	"The Tortoise and the Hare!" "Duel au soleil"	Luc Lefebvre; Fred Mintoff	François Rosso; Hugo Gittard	TBA	136
37	"Statue of Imitations" "De l'art ou du lapin"	Hadrien Soulez-Lariviere; Vincent Dubost	François Rosso; Hugo Gittard	TBA	137
38	"So Long, Saloon" "Saloon à vendre"	Jean-Louis Momus; Sylvain Lavoie	François Rosso; Hugo Gittard	TBA	138
Granny has made a terrible mistake! She's forgotten to renew the Cowboys' saloon lease! Despite her claims that the mistake is a small administrative oversight that shall soon be resolved, the Cowboys discover that their home is up for sale, and potential buyers are already dropping by to have a look. Bob eventually buys the saloon and the Cowboys must move into a shabby old residence. The only way to get their saloon back is to try to catch Bob in the middle of a criminal act and seize all of his belongings. Easier said than done, though...
39	"Hallowed Hologram!" "Le retour de pépère"	Manon Berthelet; Muguette Berthelet; Mauro Calasese	François Rosso; Hugo Gittard	TBA	139
40	"Promotion Commotion" "Promotion ou commotion ?"	Jason Bogdaneris	François Rosso; Hugo Gittard	TBA	140
41	"Vase That?" "Le vase casse-tête"	Nisha Muire; Denis Doucet	François Rosso; Hugo Gittard	TBA	141
42	"Double Trouble!"	Jason Bogdaneris; Stéphane Beau	François Rosso; Hugo Gittard	TBA	142
43	"Genie in a Throttle" "Le génie de la mousse à raser"	Nisha Muire; Fred Mintoff	François Rosso; Hugo Gittard	TBA	143
44	"Hero Tolerance" "Héros malgré lui"	Manon Berthelet; Muguette Berthelet; Vincent Dubost	François Rosso; Hugo Gittard	TBA	144
45	"Psycho Switch" "Histoire de fous"	Manon Berthelet; Muguette Berthelet; Fred Mintoff	François Rosso; Hugo Gittard	TBA	145
46	"Bad Baby" "Sale môme"	Jono Howard; Sylvain Lavoie	François Rosso; Hugo Gittard	TBA	146
47	"Guest Work" "La fête"	Luc Lefebvre; Marc-Antoine Sauvillers	François Rosso; Hugo Gittard	TBA	147
48	"Pyramid Scheming" "L'épingle caméléon"	Sergio Manfio; Mauro Calasese	François Rosso; Hugo Gittard	TBA	148
49	"Running Joke" "Le flambeau"	Sergio Manfio; Xenia de Luigi; Denis Boucet	François Rosso; Hugo Gittard	TBA	149
50	"The Ghost Ship" "Le vaisseau fantôme"	Sergio Manfio	François Rosso; Hugo Gittard	TBA	150
51	"Game Over"	Sergio Manfio; Marc-Antoine Sauvillers	François Rosso; Hugo Gittard	TBA	151
52	"Impossible Mission!" "Mission impossible !"	TBA	François Rosso; Hugo Gittard	TBA	152

== Distribution ==
The series aired on Seven Network from Australia, and VRAK.TV in Quebec beginning in January 2004. France 3 aired the series in France, but only aired the first 20 episodes before dropping it. The remaining 32 episodes would remain unaired until Game One bought the rights to the series in December 2025 and rebroadcast the full show. Unlike most Tooncan series, Cosmic Cowboys had no Anglophone Canada distribution. Kika broadcast the series in Germany, and REN-TV (later 2x2) broadcast the series in Russia.
