= The Adventures of Grady Greenspace =

- Les Enquêtes de Chlorophylle
- Countries of origin: France; Canada
- No. of episodes: 52

Production
- Running time: 13 minutes

Original release
- Network: France 3
- Release: 1992 – 1995

Grady Greenspace

The Adventures of Grady Greenspace is a children's TV programme that was originally a French/Canadian programme called "Les Enquêtes de Chlorophylle" (roughly translated as "The Investigations of Chlorophylle"), which was co-produced by Damned Productions (Paris), la Société Française de Production, France 3, Productions Espace Vert (Montreal) and Logos Distribution and aired between 1992 and 1993 .

The UK version was produced by Central Independent Television for ITV (CITV) from 1994 to 1995.

The series was based on the character Chlorophylle created by Raymond Macherot and published by Le Lombard and was about a group of environmentally aware creatures and their adventures.

The shows characters were a combination of around twelve puppets and a large number of live animals.

== Characters ==
=== Puppets ===
- Chlorophylle (French) / Grady Greenspace (English) - The show's main protagonist. A black and white dormouse that solved crimes and environmental issues with the aid of his friends. Grady lived inside an old building and slept in a human's old slipper.
- Radar - a bat and close friend of Grady.
- Bulgy - a frog and close friend of Grady.
- Punky - a hedgehog and close friend of Grady.

- Punky and his mate got captured by L Elegant and kept prisoner by Authracite until Grady rescued them.

- Anthracite (French) / *Scuzzy (English) - The main antagonist of the series. Scuzzy was a black rat and leader of a group of animals called the Rafia or the "Creepy Crawlers", who were usually the cause of the problem that Grady was trying to solve. Occasionally, however, Grady and Scuzzy had to join forces to deal with other antagonists.
- Maeva (French) / Rhonda (English) - A white rat that was the sister of Scuzzy, but far sweeter and nicer than her brother. She was also Grady's love interest.
- L ELEGANT (French) - A Stoat who is a loyal henchman to Anthracite who kidnaps, steals and even assaults anyone who tries to interfere with Anthracite’s wicked plans.

=== Live Animals ===
- The Council - A group of Eurasian eagle owls that many local animals often consult when they needed advice
- Golden eagles - An Antagonist who kidnapped Rhonda and kept her prisoner in his nest until Grady rescued her.

- Also helped Grady chase away some Beavers that had kidnapped Rhonda so Grady could rescue her.

- Red fox

One of Anthracite‘s allies who scared off some Beavers that were up to no good.

== Cast and crew ==
=== Directors ===
- Frédéric Goupil
- Claude Grégoire
- Michel Marin
- Bruno Carrière

=== Production Manager ===
- Karine Dhont

=== Writers ===
- Michel Marin
- Diane Cailhier

=== Cinematography ===
- Jacques Meynard

=== Voice Actors ===
- Terrence Scammell - lead voice actor for English version.

== Episodes ==
There were 52 episodes in total. Known episodes:

- Vote For Grady - first aired in the UK on 03/05/1995.
- Shady Business - first aired in the UK on 17/05/1995.
