= Kitty Cats =

Canadian children's TV series

- Genre: Children's television series
- Created by: Kristine Rosen
- Written by: Michéle Poirer; Marielle Ferragne (dialogue)
- Directed by: André Guérard; Richard Lahaie; Peter Svatek
- Starring: Johanne Rodrigue; Michel P. Ranger; Sylvie Comtois; André Meunier; Louise-Anok Ouellet; Richard Lalancette
- Theme music composer: Patrice Dubuc
- Composers: Michel Smith; Bertrand Chénier
- Country of origin: Canada
- Original language: French
- No. of episodes: 196

Production
- Executive producer: Claude Godbout
- Producer: Laurent Bourdon
- Production locations: Montreal, Quebec
- Camera setup: Jacques Chartrand; Richard Desmaris; Luc Vanier
- Running time: 15 minutes
- Production company: Les Productions Prisma

Original release
- Network: Télévision de Radio-Canada
- Release: September 1991 – 1995

Kitty Cats is a French-Canadian children's television series created by Kristine Rosen. The show consists of a range of puppet animal characters that live in a backyard.

== Plot ==
The series focused on the adventures of three animal friends: two kittens named Tango and Ricky and a puppy named Charlie. Tango and Ricky live in their own house in the countryside while Charlie lives in a small cave in their backyard.

The three meet up every day and play together at the backyard of Tango and Ricky's house. Tango and Ricky's backyard also has a large tree which is the home of a bird named Flap, who is a good friend of the main characters and visits them frequently.

Along the series the main characters spend most of their time making up games and stories to act out and learn about life and friendship.

== Main characters ==
- Tango – A female calico cat and Ricky's apparent sister.
- Ricky – A male tabby cat, and Tango's apparent brother.
- Charlie – A male puppy who goes to school with his unknown friend, Eugene.
- Flap – A multicolored bird who travels the world.
- Rosie – A female fox-like dog who is friends with the other characters.
- Willie – A mischievous hedgehog who plays pranks on his friends.

== Voice cast ==
| Character | French voice | English voice |
|---|---|---|
| Tango | Johanne Rodrigue | Sonja Ball |
| Ricky | André Meunier | Thor Bishopric |
| Charlie | Michel P. Ranger | Michael Rudder |
| Flap | Richard Lalancette | Rick Jones |
| Rosie | Louise-Anouk Ouellet, Sylvie Comtois | Pauline Little |
| Willie | Richard Lalancette | Terrence Scammell |

== Broadcast ==
The series was produced originally in French for Télévision de Radio-Canada under the title Pacha et les chats, and was later dubbed into English for the inaugural version of TLC's Ready Set Learn! block in the United States.

== Alternative titles ==
- Pacha et les chats (French title)
- קיטי קט וחומי (Hebrew title)
- A Turma dos Gatos (Brazilian title)
- Gatos Rabinos (Portuguese title)
- Los Gatitos (Latin American title)
- بسابيس (Arabic title)
- Mačkići (Serbian title)
- 近所の猫たち (Japanese title)
