= The Legend of the North Wind =

- Theatrical release poster
- Directed by: Carlos Varela; Maite Ruiz de Austri (originally credited directors); Juan Bautista Berasategi (original director, uncredited)
- Written by: Gregorio Muro; Carlos Varela; Maite Ruiz de Austri; Joxan Muñoz
- Produced by: Iñigo Silva; Mikel Arregi; Santi Uriarte
- Starring: English language voice cast: Sonja Ball; Daniel Brochu; A.J. Henderson; Rick Jones; Terrence Scammell
- Cinematography: Eduardo Elósegi
- Edited by: José Salcedo
- Music by: Alejandro Massó
- Production companies: Episa; Euskal Pictures International
- Distributed by: Euskal Pictures International (Spain); Nelvana (international)
- Release date: 1992
- Running time: 69 minutes
- Country: Spain
- Languages: Basque; Spanish

The Legend of the North Wind is a 1992 Spanish animated fantasy film directed by Juan Bautista Berasategi (originally credited to Maite Ruiz de Austri and Carlos Varela). It was based upon a story by Gregorio Muro and Josean Muñoz, and produced by Episa along Euskal Pictures International.

It was produced in the Spain under the working title of Balleneros (Basque title: Balearenak), until being released in 1992 as La leyenda del viento del Norte (EU Spanish), La légende du vent du nord (French), and Ipar haizearen erronka (Basque).

== Production ==
Initially, the released film was credited to Maite Ruiz de Austri and Carlos Varela, but Berasategi sued the producers for plagiarism, charging that the majority of the film was developed under his direction, and that Ruiz de Austri and Varela had received undue credit for what was actually his work. While paying royalties, Berasategi eventually won the case, and received legal recognition as the film's director. This is reflected on more recent releases of the film, in which the original director credit is replaced with a new credit for Berasategi.

An English-dubbed version was released in North America as a direct-to-video release by Plaza Entertainment and Canada-based Nelvana in 1997, in which the film was not released until five years later.

The EU Spanish release was followed by a 13-episode TV series, and a 1994 sequel called El regreso del Viento del Norte, or The Return of the North Wind.

== Synopsis ==
To get his hands on a valuable mob of whales, a 17th-century European daredevil in Newfoundland foolishly attempts to release the powers of the mythical North Wind, who was trapped in a pot thanks to a shared effort by Basque sailors and Mi'kmaq tribes. Later, the descendant of those tribes, Watuna, and the descendants of those Basque sailors, Ane and Peiot, must defeat the evil Athanasius until he achieves his purpose.

== Voice cast ==
Basque version (original version)

- Xabier Eguzkiza as the Narrator
- Xebe Atencia as Pello
- Asun Iturriagagoitia as Ane
- Luz Enparanza as Watuna
- Xabier Eguzkiza as Captain Galar
- Kepa Cueto as The North Wind/Athanasius
- Xabier Ponbo as Bakailu
- Aitor Larrañaga as Martin
- Tere Jaioas The Sea

EU Spanish version

- Damián Velasco
- Chelo Vivares
- Gonzalo Durán
- Vicente Gisbert
- Isabel Fernández
- María José Castro
- Ángela María Romero
- Amparo Climent
- Teófilo Martínez
- Pedro Sempson
- José Carabias
- Daniel Dicenta
- Eduardo Jover
- José María Martín

English version

- Sonja Ball as Anne
- Teddy Lee Dillon as Elliot
- Daniel Brochu as Watuna
- A.J. Henderson as Captain Galar
- Terrence Scammell as The North Wind/Athanasius
- Rick Jones as Barnaby
- Richard M. Dumont as Martin
- Pierre Lenoir as The Mi'kmaq Chief
- Gary Jewell as Mr. Blackburn (credited as "Ship Owner")
- Kathleen Fee as The Sea
