= David Copperfield (1993 film) =

- Genre: Animation; Drama; Musical; Romance
- Based on: David Copperfield by Charles Dickens
- Written by: Judith Reeves-Stevens
- Directed by: Don Arioli
- Starring: Sheena Easton; Kelly Le Brock; Julian Lennon; Howie Mandel
- Theme music composer: Joel Hirschhorn
- Composers: Joel Hirschhorn; Al Kasha; Roger Larocque
- Country of origin: Canada
- Original language: English

Production
- Producers: Michel Lemire; Philippe Mounier; Jacques Pettigrew
- Running time: 91 minutes
- Production company: CinéGroupe

Original release
- Network: NBC
- Release: December 10, 1993

David Copperfield is a 1993 Canadian traditionally animated film adaptation of Charles Dickens' classic 1850 novel of the same name. Produced for and premiered on NBC, the film is directed by Don Arioli and features the voices of Sheena Easton, Julian Lennon, Howie Mandel, Andrea Martin, Kelly Le Brock, Michael York and Joseph Marcell.

Loosely based on Dickens' original plot, the human characters are replaced with anthropomorphic animals. It omits several major characters (such as Mr Creakle, Dora Spenlow and Uriah Heep) and adds fantastical elements, such as the "moldies" and the "cheese monster".

== Plot ==
As female cat Betsey Trotwood makes her way through the Christmas festive streets of Blunderstone to see her niece, Clara, leonine Edward Murdstone and fat rodent Grimby are seeking new "workers" by abducting orphans and urchins off the streets. At the Copperfield estate, David is born and named after his late father. Betsey is furious when she finds out that her great-niece is actually a great-nephew.

Years later, Clara marries Murdstone; David does not approve of the marriage and despises Murdstone. When she is brought down by illness, Murdstone arranges for David to move with him to London to work in his factory, where he encounters Agnes Wickfield and her father the Duke. Once Agnes and the Duke are gone, Murdstone throws David into the factory where he is beaten and tossed about by Murdstone's security force.

David is given shelter in the Micawber's house, and befriends a dog named Mealy, a worker abducted the night David was born. The Micawbers only act cruel toward David and the others in front of Murdstone and his men. Murdstone reveals to Grimby that he has kept David unaware of his mother's condition. David hopes to escape from the factory though Mealy tells him of various obstacles like the "Cheese Monster", a vulture that circles the premises to catch runaways. With this in mind, David turns to Robinson Crusoe–inspired methods of bettering the workplace. Murdstone discovers this and punishes David and Mealy by isolating them in the factory's tower. Later, he blackmails the Micawbers by making sure David is not treated with care or else their children would work in the factory.

Agnes, disguised in a beggar's cloak, sees the working conditions in Murdstone's factory. While working the night shift, David glimpses the "Moldies" in a drainage grate, one of Murdstone's experiments that trapped workers in a mold-like slime. Agnes and David reunite, but Murdstone ushers Agnes out. The Duke is more concerned with how this might damage his reputation rather than listening to his daughter.

When Clara dies, Peggotty arrives and has Micawber hide Clara's will before giving David the news. Mealy reveals that Murdstone and Grimby have been fattening up the Cheese Monster so they can eat it. The Cheese Monster overhears this and becomes upset.

Murdstone and Grimby find the will and revel in David's seemingly broken state, but Mealy and David set up their plot to escape. Agnes arrives to seek out David but is captured. Mealy briefly fights off Grimby and Murdstone for a chance to get David over the gate, while Agnes gets away from the crooked guards. The Cheese Monster gives David a chance to catch up to Agnes and the two leave for Dover where Aunt Betsey lives. Micawber and Mealy are tossed into the sewers where the Moldies lurk while Peggotty and Mrs. Micawber are kept under security.

That night, Agnes gets separated from David and is trapped by wild boars in a tree. David finds her the next morning, and with some effort, pushes a boulder to ward off the boars. However, the boulder also knocks over the tree and Agnes' cries for help catch the attention of Murdstone and Grimby. Agnes and David plummet down a waterfall, but emerge near Aunt Betsey's place. Despite her earlier animosity, Betsey is glad to see David and agrees to help get back at Murdstone and Grimby and freeing their slaves.

Murdstone and Grimby try to get the Duke to sign over complete control of the cheese factory, but Aunt Betsey comes in with a full-on police force to arrest them while David fights off Murdstone and Grimby. The employees are freed and celebrate as Murdstone and Grimby are taken away. David finds and helps Mealy and Micawber (now mostly covered in mold) to escape, along with the Moldies. The sunlight that comes through the open grating is enough to break open the Moldies' cheese shells and return them to normal.

On Christmas, David hosts the grand opening of the Copperfield Orphanage, with all Murdstone's former workers there; everyone cheers for David and Agnes' love.

== Voice cast ==
- Julian Lennon as David Copperfield (cat)
- Kelly Le Brock as Clara Copperfield (cat)
- Sheena Easton as Agnes Wickfield (cat)
- Arthur Holden as The Duke Wickfield (cat)
- Howie Mandel as Mealy (dog)
- Andrea Martin as Aunt Betsey (cat)
- Michael York as Edward Murdstone (cat)
- Richard Dumont as Grimby (mouse/rat)
- Susan Glover as Mrs. Micawber (monkey), Peggotty (bear)
- Joseph Marcell as Mr. Micawber (monkey)
- Walter Massey as Doctor (cat)
- Sonja Ball as Cheese Monster (vulture), Bird, Additional Voices
- Terrence Scammell as Butcher (pig), Baker (raccoon), Additional voices

== Songs ==
The songs are written by Al Kasha and Joel Hirschhorn.

- "I Hate Boys!" – Aunt Betsey (Martin)
- "I'll Be Your Hero" – David (Lennon)
- "Welcome to my Warehouse" – Murdstone and Grimby (York and Dumont)
- "Is There Anyone?" – Agnes and David (Easton and Lennon)
- "Something's Gonna Turn Up" – David and Micawber (Lennon and Marcell)
- "Imagination" – (Groulx)
- "Everyone's a Big Cheese Here" – (Groulx)
- "Street Smart" – Mealy (Mandel; although featured, this song was mysteriously uncredited)
- "Family Christmas" – Agnes, David, Micawber and Aunt Betsey (Easton, Lennon, Marcell and Martin)

== See also ==
- List of animated feature-length films
