= Walter Massey (actor) =

Canadian actor (1928–2014)

- Born: Walter Edward Hart Massey; August 19, 1928; Toronto, Ontario, Canada
- Died: August 4, 2014 (aged 85); Montreal, Quebec, Canada
- Years active: 1956–2014
- Known for: Papa Beaver's Storytime (1993–1998); Arthur (1996–2015)
- Spouse: Sharman Yarnell
- Awards: ACTRA Award for Excellence; Larry McCance Award for Excellence (awarded by the Canadian Actors' Equity Association

Walter Edward Hart Massey (August 19, 1928 – August 4, 2014) was a Canadian actor, best known for voicing Principal Herbert Haney on the animated series Arthur and The Doctor in the English version of The Mysterious Cities of Gold. He was based in Montreal, Quebec.

He played Dr. Donald Stewart on the 1990s version of Lassie, and had numerous roles on stage, and in films and television, for more than six decades. Massey was the cousin of actor Raymond Massey and was a founding member of Canadian Actors' Equity.

Walter Massey's father, Denton, was an engineer and Ontario politician.

Massey died in Montreal, Quebec on August 4, 2014.

== Awards ==
In 1988, the Canadian Actors' Equity Association voted him the Larry McCance Award for his service to the organization. He was also presented with the Montreal ACTRA Award of Excellence in 2007.

== Filmography ==
- Now That April's Here (1958) – John Williams
- A Cool Sound from Hell (1959) – Pilot
- The Unforeseen (1960)
- The Unpredictable Leader (1965)
- Seaway (1965) – Himself
- Illegal Abortion (1966)
- Don't Let the Angels Fall (1969) – Police Sergeant
- Espolio (1970)
- Loving and Laughing (1971)
- Dr. Simon Locke (1971) – Ed
- Family Court (1971) – Court Clerk
- Our Land is Our Life (1974)
- The Heatwave Lasted Four Days (1975)
- The 1 CAG Story (1977) – Narrator
- Duplessis (1977) – George Marler
- Blood Relatives (1978) – Mr. Lowery
- Jacob Two-Two Meets the Hooded Fang (1978) – Father
- Canada Vignettes: Hudden and Dudden and Donald O'Neary (1978)
- Tomorrow Never Comes (1978) – Sergeant
- Two Solitudes (1978)
- Legends and Life of the Inuit (1978)
- Soils of Canada (1978)
- Bravery in the Field (1979) – Policeman in Hospital
- Amber Waves (1980)
- Astro Boy (1980) – Peter's Owner (Cinelume Dub)
- Agency (1980) – Minister
- Acting Class (1980) – Narrator
- Under New Management (1981) – Narrator
- Happy Birthday to Me (1981) – Conventioneer Leader
- Gas (1981) – Major Bright
- Top Priority - 1981
- Ulysses 31 (1981) – Aeolus (English Version)
- Black Mirror (1981) – Julie's Father
- The Concert Man (1982) – Narrator
- Hard Feelings (1982) – Mr. Fitch
- The Mysterious Cities of Gold (1982) – Captain Perez/The Doctor (English Version)
- Cook & Peary: The Race to the Pole (1983) – Theodore Roosevelt
- Snow Job (1983) – Guest Appearance
- Belle and Sebastian (1984) – Inspector Garcia
- Evil Judgement (1984) – Ron/Robertson
- Mrs. Soffel (1984) – District Attorney
- The Hotel New Hampshire (1984) – Texan
- Discussions in Bioethics: Happy Birthday (1985)
- Caffè Italia, Montréal (1985)
- Blue Line (1985) – Father
- Breaking All the Rules (1985) – Charlie
- The Blue Man (1985) – John Westmore
- Zombie Nightmare (1986) – Mr. Peters
- The Boy in Blue (1986) – Mayor
- Spearfield's Daughter (1986) – Bronowski
- Dead Man's Letters (1986) – English Voiceover
- Le Dernier Havre (1986)
- Making Transitions (1986) – Narrator
- Ford: The Man and the Machine (1987)
- Shades of Love: Lilac Dream (1987) – Ezra
- First Journey: Fort William (1987) – Narrator
- Night Zoo (1987) – Mr. Chagnon
- The Morning Man (1987)
- Future Block (1987)
- Diplodos (1987) – Additional Voices
- Adventures of the Little Koala (1987) – Papa/Dr. Nose
- The Wonderful Wizard of Oz (1987) – Uncle Henry
- The Gnomes' Great Adventure (1987) – The Man
- The World of David the Gnome (1987) – King Conrad/Pondent/Walter/Paul/Various Gnomes
- Bobobobs (1988) – Captain Bob Wouter
- The Smoggies (1988) – Clarence
- Of Dice and Men (1988)
- Malarek (1988) – Judge
- No Blame (1988) – Mr. Donaldson
- State Park (1988) – Rancewell
- Lance et compte II (1988) – Bill Simpson
- Red Earth, White Earth (1989) – Doc
- The Twilight Zone (1989) – Professor
- Snake Eater II: The Drug Buster (1989) – Judge
- Jacknife (1989) – Ed Buckman
- Bumpety Boo (1989) – Additional Voices
- Nutsberry Town (1989) – Mr. Walnut
- Maya the Bee (1989) – Old Man
- Baron Münchhausen in a Whale of a Tale: A German Legend (1989) – Narrator/Baron Münchhausen
- Whispers (1990) – Bank Manager
- The Littl' Bits (1990) – Narrator
- Jungle Book Shonen Mowgli (1990) – Akela, Alexander
- Sharky and George (1990) – Additional Voices
- The Little Flying Bears (1990) – Plato
- The Adventures of Peter Pan (1990) – Additional Voices
- Saban's Adventures of Pinocchio (1990) – Geppetto
- Saban's Adventures of the Little Mermaid (1991) – Additional Voices
- Jungle Tales (1991)
- Second Debut (1991)
- Bob in a Bottle (1991) – Additional Voices
- Samurai Pizza Cats (1991) – Guru Lou
- The Hidden Room (1991) – Grandpa
- Nelligan (1991) – Lord Van Horne
- The Real Story of O Christmas Tree (1991) – Santa Claus
- Canada Strikes Oil: Leduc, Alberta 1947 (1991) – Narrator
- On Strike: The Winnipeg General Strike, 1919 (1991)
- Double or Nothing: The Rise and Fall of Robert Campeau (1992)
- Are You Afraid of the Dark? (1992) – Grandpa Samuel/Bob McGorrill
- Armen and Bullik (1992) – Le capitaine North
- La conquête de l'Amérique I (1992)
- The Bush Baby (1992) – Professor Crankshaw
- Sandokan (1992) – Additional Voices
- Gulliver's Travels (1992) – Additional Voices
- Favorite Songs (1992)
- Christopher Columbus (1992) – Additional Voices
- Spirou (1992) – Additional Voices
- David Copperfield (1993) – Doctor
- Papa Beaver's Storytime (1993) – Papa Beaver
- Cat Tales (1994) – The Horse
- The Maharaja's Daughter (1994) – Dr. Donnelly
- Mrs. Parker and the Vicious Circle (1994) – Phillip the Producer
- Sirens (1994) – Security Guard/James Tambor
- Hart to Hart: Two Harts in 3/4 Time (1995) – Herb Hall
- Robinson Sucroe (1995)
- Arthur (1996–2015) – Principal Francis Haney, Mr. Marco
- Night Hood (1996) – Inspector Ganimard
- How the Toys Saved Christmas (1996) – Mr. Tinkler
- Space Cases (1996) – Julian Mrtz
- Animal Crackers (1997) – Additional Voices
- The Country Mouse and the City Mouse Adventures (1997) – Additional Voices
- Caillou (1997) – Additional Voices
- Patrol 03 (1997) – Additional Voices
- Lassie (1997–1999) – Dr. Stewart
- Ripley's Believe It or Not! (1998) – Additional Voices
- Eye of the Wolf (1998)
- Bonanno: A Godfather's Story (1999), released in the U.S. under the title, The Youngest Godfather – Don Calo Schiro
- Tommy and Oscar (1999)
- Monet: Shadow and Light (1999) – Leduc
- Dead Silent (1999) – Nate Henderson
- Waking the Dead (2000) – Otto Ellis
- For Better or For Worse (2000) – Additional Voices
- Charley and Mimmo (2000) – Grandpa
- Upstairs, Downstairs Bears (2000) – Dr. Fozzbury
- A Miss Mallard Mystery (2000) – Additional Voices
- Wunschpunsch (2000) – Additional Voices
- The Man Who Talks with Wolves (2001)
- Varian's War (2001) – Sydney
- Galidor: Defenders of the Outer Dimension (2002) – Nepol
- Arthur, It's Only Rock and Roll (2002) – Principal Francis Haney
- The Stork Derby (2002) – Mr. Walden
- Caillou's Holiday Movie (2003) – Santa
- Tripping the Rift (2004) – Additional Voices
- Billy and Buddy (2004) – Grandpa
- The Legend of the Christmas Tree (2005) – Priest
- The Greatest Game Ever Played (2005) – President Taft
- Dr. Norman Bethune (2006) – Grandfather Bethune
- My First Wedding (2006) – Father James
- My Daughter's Secret (2007) – Tom
- A Dennis the Menace Christmas (2007) – Wilbur Newman
- Tripping the Rift: The Movie (2008) – Additional Voices
- Secrets of the Summer House (2008) – George III Wickersham
- The Velveteen Rabbit (2009) – Dr. Kennedy
- Gummibär: The Yummy Gummy Search for Santa (2012) – Santa

== See also ==
- Massey family
