= Night Hood =

- Intertitle
- Directed by: François Brisson; Pascal Morelli
- Theme music composer: Milan Kymlicka
- Country of origin: Canada; France
- No. of seasons: 1
- No. of episodes: 26

Production
- Executive producers: Micheline Charest; Ronald A. Weinberg; Christian Davin
- Producers: Cassandra Schaufausen; Christophe Izard
- Running time: 23 minutes (approx. per episode)
- Production companies: CINAR Films; France Animation

Original release
- Network: TF1; Canal+ YTV
- Release: August 15, 1996 – 1997

Night Hood is an animated series inspired by Maurice Leblanc's Arsène Lupin novels, produced by CINAR Films and France Animation for television audiences in both English and French-speaking nations. It was set in the 1930s. The series aired in Canada in 1996 on YTV and in 1998 on Teletoon under the English-language title Night Hood, and in francophone markets as Les Exploits d'Arsène Lupin.

== Characters ==
Lupin's allies (whom he sometimes has to rescue) are his aide Grognard, veteran reporter of the New York Enquirer Kelly Kincaid, and cub reporter Max Leblanc. The police, usually represented by Inspector Ganimard and Sergeant Folenfant, try to capture Lupin at every chance. Billionaire industrialist and arms manufacturer H. R. Karst is Lupin's archenemy. Karst's assistants are a tough man named Steel, a crafty woman called Countess May Hem, a pair of slightly incompetent but cunning thugs called Joe Gila and Diesel.

== Cast ==
- Daniel Brochu as Max Leblanc
- Luis de Cespedes as Arsène Lupin
  - Michael Caloz as Young Arsène Lupin
- Susan Glover as Countess May Hem
- Richard Dumont as Grognard
- Dean Hagopian as Howard Randolph Karst
- Jane Woods as Kelly Kincaid
- Rick Jones as Steel
- AJ Henderson as Sgt Folenfant
- Walter Massey as Insp Ganimard

== Episodes ==
No.	Title
101	"Elementary, My Dear Lupin"
102	"The Modern Weapon"
103	"The Von Luppo Affair"
104	"$20 Million Beneath the Sea"
105	"The Empire Karst Building"
106	"Sam the Golden Hand"
107	"The Diva's Diamonds"
108	"The Secret of the Golden Scarab"
109	"A Prince on the Orient Express"
110	"The Archduke of Austrovia"
111	"The South African Mine Shakedown"
112	"Operation Iris"
113	"The Mystery of Captain Blade"
114	"Lupin Takes Pole Position"
115	"The Pearl of Sinbad"
116	"Lupin Hits Seventy"
117	"When Lupin Steps Into Action"
118	"Lady M"
119	"The Green Star"
120	"The Dove of Peace"
121	"President's Oil"
122	"Sicilian Power"
123	"A Fistful of Gold"
124	"The Arkinite Crystal"
125	"Karst for President"
126	"To Catch Lupin"

== See also ==
- Blake and Mortimer (TV series)
- Carland Cross (TV series)
- Cybersix (TV series)
