= Flatmania =

French-Canadian animated television series

- Created by: Isabelle Simler; Sophie Castalgnede
- Developed by: Prakash Topsy
- Opening theme: Take Me There, sung by Anggun
- Countries of origin: France; Canada
- Original language: English
- No. of seasons: 4
- No. of episodes: 52

Production
- Executive producers: Philippe Delarue; Aton Soumache
- Production companies: Method Animation; Futurikon; Vivatoon

Original release
- Network: France 3 (France); YTV (Canada)
- Release: 2004 – 2008

Flatmania is a French-Canadian animated television series, which is based on a visual style created by Anne-Caroline Pandolfo and Isabelle Simler and produced by Method Animation, Futurikon and Vivatoon with the participation of Disney Televisions France, YTV, SRC, and France 3, The series is about a teenager named Vincent who gets transported into the Flatmania (a series of magazines) paper world. During each adventure, Vincent and Kyu arrive on a latest magazine and must find a rift that will send them to the next magazine.

== Characters ==
- Vincent (voiced by Oliver Grainger) – The lead character.
- Kyu (voiced by Eleanor Noble) – A cute friend.

== Art style ==
The characters in Flatmania are animated as two-dimensionally flat, so when they turn around or are seen from the side, appear to be paper. The style was re-used in another Futurikon series, Pop Secret.

== Television airing ==
The series is first premiered on France 3 in France. Internationally, the series is aired on Animania TV in the United States, YTV and SRC in Canada, ABC Kids in Australia, Pop in the UK, Rai Gulp in Italy, Nickelodeon in Germany, ZigZap in Poland and Happy TV in Serbia.
