= Michael Rudder =

Canadian actor

Michael Rudder (born June 14, 1950) is a Canadian film, television, theatre and voice actor. Rudder was injured in the 2008 Mumbai attacks.

== Acting work ==
Born in Toronto, Ontario, Canada, Rudder was a Genie Award nominee in 1989 for Best Supporting Actor for his role in Buying Time. His film credits include Scanners II: The New Order, Breaking All the Rules, The Adventures of Pluto Nash, One Eyed King, Taken, Blindside and Splinter Cell, and his television credits include episodes of Dr. Quinn, Medicine Woman, The Hunger, Are You Afraid of the Dark?, The Hitchhiker, Katts and Dog, Urban Angel, War of the Worlds and the Canadian series Night Heat.

Rudder is a well-known voice actor for such video games as Prince of Persia, Far Cry, Jagged Alliance, Splinter Cell, Deus Ex: Human Revolution, and Assassin's Creed.

He also does voices on several animated TV shows such as A Miss Mallard Mystery, Bobobobs, The Legend of White Fang, Young Robin Hood, Princess Sissi, Animal Crackers, The Wonderful Wizard of Oz, Maya the Bee, The Mysterious Cities of Gold, Wunschpunsch, Night Hood, X-DuckX, Daft Planet, X-Chromosome, The Country Mouse and the City Mouse Adventures, Arthur, Postcards from Buster, Kitty Cats, The Little Lulu Show, and more.

He has also done extensive narration, versioning and commercial voice work, and appeared in films for The National Film Board of Canada, Cinar and Telescene in Quebec.

A professional stage actor since his teens, recent stage roles include Almady in "The Play's The Thing" (2011); and Jerry Dingleman in "The Apprenticeship of Duddy Kravitz" (2015), both at The Segal Centre in Montreal.

An expert in sound recording, Rudder also works as a studio director in the post-synchronization of film dialogue and as a director of dubbed film and cartoon product for the world English market.

== Mumbai attack ==
Rudder was shot four times during the Mumbai attack in 2008. He says he survived by using his film knowledge to "play dead."

A student of transcendental meditation and Siddha Yoga since his twenties, Rudder, now a teacher of Synchronicity High-Tech Meditation, was in India on a spiritual vacation with members of the Synchronicity Foundation, and a guest of the Oberoi Hotel in Mumbai when the attacks took place. He is considering writing a book, a movie or a play about his experiences, to tell the story of his experience and miraculous escape, and to help others who have endured similar trauma:

I am fascinated and motivated by the meditative experience. I realize that what I was experiencing was a battlefield situation without any machismo or John Wayne bravado. I was experiencing the cool, humorous, attentive alertness of the moment. That might really serve to help my Canadian brothers and sisters who are fighting in war zones. I'd like to teach meditation to the guys and girls with shrapnel wounds such as mine. It would be a great way to rid oneself of fear and hatred and all the negative emotions that cloud our minds at such times.
