= Gofrette =

- Genre: Animated series Comedy; Surreal comedy Fantasy; Children
- Created by: Doris Brasset; Fabienne Michot
- Voices of: Sonja Ball; Mark Camacho; Lucinda Davis
- Opening theme: Gonna Have a Good, Great Day (performed by Nikki Yanofsky)
- Ending theme: Gonna Have a Good, Great Day (instrumental)
- Composer: Judith Henderson
- Country of origin: Canada
- No. of seasons: 1
- No. of episodes: 52

Production
- Executive producers: Kim Wilson; Dr. Lynn Oldershaw
- Producers: Marie-Josee Corbiel; Christine Cote; Toper Taylor; Julie June; Chris Kriegman; Amy Sprecher; Erin Wanner; Melinda Toporoff
- Running time: 12 minutes
- Production companies: Zoe Mae Productions; Subsequence Entertainment

Original release
- Network: CBC Television (Canada)
- Release: September 8, 2007 – August 30, 2008

Gofrette is a fantasy animated children's television series that aired from September 8, 2007 to August 30, 2008, on CBC Television's Kids' CBC block in Canada. Targeting a preschool audience of children aged 2 to 6 years old (often specifically marketed for ages 4 and up), it is produced by Zoe Mae and Sub-Sequence Entertainment, and is based on the series of children's books by Doris Brasset and Fabienne Michot.

== Plot ==
Gofrette is about a curious young, anthropomorphic cat along with his dog and bird (Fudge and Ellie), who are best friends. The cat lives through various adventures, evoking the program's tagline: "... that busy, busy cat!". The show takes place in the fictional town of Zanimo and is based on the original books written by Doris Brasset and Fabienne Michot.

== Characters ==
=== Main ===
Gofrette. A curious anthropomorphic cat who makes every day in Zanimo (Europe) an exciting day with his huge imagination, endless supply of hobby equipment, and a go-for-it demeanour. He lives in a house with Red, the talking refrigerator to whom he talks and understands; with his stuffed animal, Long Ears; and with tiny, creatively active animals he calls "Gnugnuts". His uncle, Garbanzo, is an acrobat who owns and stars in the El Teatro Zanimo circus. Gofrette also has a grandmother, Granny Smith (named after an Australian apple cultivar), who is only mentioned and shown in photographs. He is voiced by Sonja Ball. Gofrette's favourite exclamation is "Zowie!", sometimes with a variation such as, "Zowie zow zow!".

Fudge. An anthropomorphic dog with big floppy ears. Fudge is sometimes reluctant to get into what he thinks of as scary or embarrassing situations, but he is usually a good sport once participating. He is a bit fussy with his ears, and a source of his reluctance to participate in things. He owns a van called the Zanimo Wagon that he also lives in. He has been friends with Gofrette since they were a puppy and a kitty. He often uses the catchphrase, "Wowie Zowie Gofrette." He has a big brother named Moocher, who is a mechanic and artist. He is voiced by Mark Camacho. He is also known as "Blue" in books.

Ellie Coptor. A pink-coloured bird with a propeller on her head that twirls depending on her mood. She operates a hair salon in her treehouse and plays with a quite bit in fashion and makeovers. As best friends with Gofrette and Fudge, Ellie rounds out the three with her fun, creative, and sometimes nervous–but–always–strong personality. Ellie's favourite snack is worms (which grosses out Fudge). She is voiced by Lucinda Davis. She has an aunt named Edna who wrote a book (in the cartoon) called "Trapeze is For the Birds".

== Episodes ==
1. "The Diving Lesson" — 2007.09.08
2. "Blue Torteloony" — 2007.09.15
3. "Hot Chocolate Moose" — 2007.09.22
4. "Silence... and Action" — 2007.09.29
5. "To Fly a Kite" — 2007.10.06
6. "Blueberry Fish Soup" — 2007.10.13
7. "Finding Fudge" — 2007.10.20
8. "3 Little Pigs" — 2007.10.27
9. "For the Birds" — 2007.11.03
10. "Where's Long Ears" — 2007.11.10
11. "A Day at the Beach" — 2007.11.17
12. "Surprise Party" — 2007.11.24
13. "Zanimosaurus" — 2007.12.01
14. "Moocher Returns" — 2007.12.08
15. "The Snail Race" — 2007.12.15
16. "Miss Know-It-All" — 2007.12.22
17. "Monster Hunting" — 2007.12.29
18. "Starstruck" — 2008.01.05
19. "Wendell's Makeover" — 2008.01.12
20. "The Birdysitter" — 2008.01.19
21. "The Barber of Zanimo!" — 2008.01.26
22. "One Silly Fusilli Cat!" — 2008.02.02
23. "The Pirates of Zanimo" — 2008.02.09
24. "The Falling Out" — 2008.02.16
25. "Bellybutton Day!" — 2008.02.23
26. "Zippety Hair Do Day" — 2008.03.01
27. "Red's Day Out" — 2008.03.08
28. "The Falling Star" — 2008.03.15
29. "Crazy Flu!" — 2008.03.22
30. "Mystery Presents" — 2008.03.29
31. "To Catch the Wind" — 2008.04.05
32. "Bike Rally" — 2008.04.12
33. "Home Sweet Home" — 2008.04.19
34. "Zanimo Man" — 2008.04.26
35. "Quicky Slows Down" — 2008.05.03
36. "The Scary Sleepover" — 2008.05.10
37. "The Legend of The Zanimozopogo" — 2008.05.17
38. "Camping Diva" — 2008.05.24
39. "Goodbye Fusillis" — 2008.05.31
40. "Super Hero's Super Sale" — 2008.06.07
41. "The Blossom Tree" — 2008.06.14
42. "To the Top" — 2008.06.21
43. "Mr. Babaloonie" — 2008.06.28
44. "To Catch a Cuckoo" — 2008.07.05
45. "Butterfly Garden" — 2008.07.12
46. "Munching Plant" — 2008.07.19
47. "The Crossing Guard" — 2008.07.26
48. "Wendell's Dinner" — 2008.08.02
49. "Ride 'Em Cowboy" — 2008.08.09
50. "The Tricky Trickster" — 2008.08.16
51. "The Disappearing Magician" — 2008.08.23
52. "The Stinky Cheese Thief" — 2008.08.30
