= Susan Glover =

Canadian actress

- Born: Susan Irene Glover; Montreal, Quebec, Canada
- Other name: Suzanne Glover
- Occupation: Actress
- Years active: 1986–present
- Known for: The Little Lulu Show (1995-1998)

Susan Irene Glover is a Canadian actress, best known for playing Sarah in Naked Josh. She is also known for voicing Mrs. Wood in Arthur, Griselda in the Cinélume dub of Winx Club, Izabella Dehavalot in Amazon Jack, Mrs. Schuman in Spaced Out, Mrs. Larkin in seasons 2 and 3 of What's with Andy?, Tubby's mom in The Little Lulu Show, Lucille in Samurai Pizza Cats, General Jinjur in the 1986 anime The Wonderful Wizard of Oz and Miss Dalee in My Goldfish Is Evil!.

She also played Ms. Noelle Atoll on the television series Radio Active and has made appearances in several films, specials, and television programmes.

== Career ==
Prior to film acting, Glover began her career doing improvisational theatre with companies such as Albert Nerenberg's Theatre Shmeatre, Acme Harpoon Co., and La Ligue National d'Improvisation. She has since appeared in theatres across Canada including, Montreal's Centaur Theatre, Ottawa's Great Canadian Theatre Company and the National Arts Centre, and Calgary's Alberta Theatre Projects. Her stage roles included the 1993 production of Peter Cureton's Passages.

She is sometimes credited as Suzanne Glover. She currently lives in Montreal, Quebec.

== Filmography ==
=== Film ===
- The Audrey Hepburn Story – English Actress
- Barnum – Queen Victoria
- The Bend – Mrs. MacDonald
- Criminal Law – Reporter
- Dead Innocent – Rosa
- Dead Like Me: Life After Death – Hudson's Mother
- Dr. Jekyll and Ms. Hyde – Nose
- False Pretenses – Art Collector
- For Hire – Dr. Peterson's Receptionist
- Going to Kansas City – Teri Kolchek
- Heart: The Marilyn Bell Story – Phyllis Rider
- Hysteria – Mrs. Schmidt
- I Do (But I Don't) – Sales Lady
- I'm Not There – Mrs. Peacock
- Isn't She Great – Sally Mae
- Jack and Ella – Alice
- Jericho Mansions – Valda
- Living with the Enemy – Tonya
- Malarek – Barmaid
- Missing – Alice's Mother
- The Peacekeeper – Presidential Aide #2
- Prom Wars – Ms. Hawthorne
- Rainbow – Flower Box Woman
- Random Encounter – Judy Grant
- The Reagans – Helene
- Revenge of the Land – Margaret
- Satan's School for Girls – Mrs. Hammersmith
- Savage Messiah – Rod's Wife
- The Secret – Condescending Woman
- Stardom – Guest appearance
- The Struggle – Mrs. Hull
- Suspicious Minds – Candy
- Ten Days to Victory – Gerda's Mother
- Two Thousand and None – Wife
- Vendetta II: The New Mafia – Dr. McMain
- Wall of Secrets – Amelie Martell
- Wargames: The Dead Code – Gail Farmer

=== Television ===
- 11 Somerset – Caller #1
- Are You Afraid of the Dark? – Olga, Parasol Lady
- Happy Castle – Lolita (voice)
- Heritage Minutes, "Wilder Penfield" – Patient with epilepsy
- Killer Wave – Red Cross Doctor
- Naked Josh – Sarah
- Nuremberg – Emmy Goering
- Radio Active – Noelle Attoll
- Seriously Weird – Ms. Pembleton
- Sirens – Mrs. Basinger
- Urban Myth Chillers – Nurse #2

=== Animation ===
- Animal Crackers – Additional Voices
- The Animal Train – Tigress
- Around the World in 80 Dreams – Additional Voices
- Arthur – Mrs. Wood, Mrs. Powers
- The Babaloos – Mom
- The Bellflower Bunnies – Additional Voices
- Billy and Buddy – Hildegarde
- Belphegor – Additional Voices
- Bob in a Bottle – Additional Voices
- The Bush Baby – Safina
- The Busy World of Richard Scarry – Additional Voices
- Cat Tales – Cow
- Charley and Mimmo – Paula
- Chip and Charlie – Character Voice
- C.L.Y.D.E. – Additional Voices
- The Country Mouse and the City Mouse Adventures – Additional Voices
- Daft Planet – Additional Voices
- David Copperfield – Additional Voices
- Divine Fate – Character Voice
- Dog's World – Character Voice
- Dragon Hunters – Character Voice
- Eye of the Wolf – Character Voice
- Flat! – Character Voice
- Flight Squad – Character Voice
- Fred the Caveman – Additional Voices
- Go Hugo Go – Izabella Dehavalot
- Gulliver's Travels – Additional Voices
- How the Toys Saved Christmas – Alfred
- Inuk – Character Voice
- Ivanhoe – Additional Voices
- Jim Button – Additional Voices
- Jungle Book Shōnen Mowgli – Kichi
- Jungle Tales – Character Voice
- The Kids from Room 402 – Additional Voices
- Kid Paddle – Grandma
- The Legend of White Fang – Additional Voices
- Lili's Island – Additional Voices
- The Little Lulu Show – Mrs. Tompkins
- Lucky Luke – Additional Voices
- The Magical Adventures of Quasimodo – Additional Voices
- Malo Korrigan – Additional Voices
- Marsupilami – Additional Voices
- Martin Mystery – Additional Voices
- Mega Babies – Additional Voices
- Mica – Character Voices
- Mimi and Friends – Character Voice
- Momo – Additional Voices
- Mona the Vampire – Additional Voices
- Monster Buster Club – Additional Voices
- My Goldfish Is Evil! – Miss Dalee
- Mystery of the Maya – Narrator
- Nathaël and the Seal Hunt – Character Voice
- Night Hood – Countess May Hem
- Nutsberry Town – Cherry, Miss Apple
- Ocean Tales – Additional Voices
- Okura – Additional Voices
- Papa Beaver's Storytime – Additional Voices
- Partly Private – Narrator
- Pet Pals – Bird
- The Phoenix – Character Voice
- Pig City – Additional Voices
- Pipi, Pupu and Rosemary – Rosemary
- Pirate Family – Additional Voices
- Princess Sissi – Additional Voices
- Prudence Gumshoe – Additional Voices
- The Real Story of The Three Little Kittens - Mother Cat
- Ripley's Believe It or Not! – Additional Voices
- Robinson Sucroe – Character Voice
- Rotten Ralph – Additional Voices
- Saban's Adventures of Peter Pan – Additional Voices
- Saban's Adventures of Pinocchio – Additional Voices
- Saban's Adventures of the Little Mermaid – Additional Voices
- Samurai Pizza Cats – Lucille Omitsu
- Sagwa, the Chinese Siamese Cat - Aunt Chi-Chi (uncredited)
- Sandokan – Additional Voices
- Sea Dogs – Character Voice
- The Secret World of Santa Claus – Additional Voices
- Sharky and George – Sarah Prawn
- Shaolin Kids – Character Voices
- Simon in the Land of Chalk Drawings – Additional Voices
- Spaced Out – Mrs. Schumann
- Spirou – Additional Voices
- Team S.O.S. – Character Voice
- The Tofus – Additional Voices
- Tommy and Oscar – Character Voice
- The Triplets – Character Voice
- Tripping the Rift – Additional Voices
- Tripping the Rift: The Movie – Additional Voices
- Turtle Island – Mischievous Mermaid
- The Twins – Additional Voices
- What's with Andy? – Mrs. Larkin (2003–2007)
- The World of David the Gnome – Additional Voices
- The Wonderful Wizard of Oz – General Jinjur
- X-Chromosome – Barb
- X-DuckX – Additional Voices
- Winx Club – Griselda, Diaspro (S2-3), Nebula and others
- Wombat City – Additional Voices
- Woofy – Additional Voices
- Wunschpunsch – Additional Voices
- Yakari – Additional Voices
- Young Robin Hood – May Queen
- Zoé Kezako – Mrs. Glouton

=== Video games ===
- Assassin's Creed – Additional Voices
- Deus Ex: Human Revolution - Athene Margoulis, Cassandra Reed
- Deus Ex: Mankind Divided - Little K
- Evolution Worlds – Anita, Secretaries #3
- Jagged Alliance – Character Voice
- Jagged Alliance 2 – Character Voice
- Laura's Happy Adventures – Carmen
- Prince of Persia: Warrior Within – Sand Warriors
- Rainbow Six 3: Black Arrow – Character Voice
- Splinter Cell – Additional Voices
- Splinter Cell: Chaos Theory – Additional Voices
- Wizardry 8 – Character Voice

=== Documentary ===
- Just for Laughs: Montreal Comedy Festival – Herself

=== Staff work ===
- The Philosopher Stoned – writer, producer, director
- The Phone Call – Stand-In: Linda Smith
- Simon in the Land of Chalk Drawings – writer
