= How the Toys Saved Christmas =

- Original theatrical poster
- Directed by: Enzo D'Alò
- Written by: Enzo D'Alò; Umberto Marino
- Based on: The Befana's Toyshop by Gianni Rodari
- Produced by: Maria Fares
- Music by: Paolo Conte
- Production companies: Alpha-Film; Lanterna Magica; Monipoly Productions
- Distributed by: Mikado Film
- Release dates: 17 September 1996 (Venice); 4 October 1996 (Italy)
- Running time: 83 minutes
- Countries: Italy; Switzerland; Germany; Luxembourg
- Language: Italian

How the Toys Saved Christmas (Italian: La Freccia Azzurra) is a 1996 Italian animated film directed by Enzo D'Alò, based on the children's novel The Befana's Toyshop by Gianni Rodari.

In the original version, the story took place during the Epiphany Eve, because in the Folklore of Italy the Befana is a good witch that gives presents and candies to the children during the night between 5 and 6 January.

== Plot ==
On the Epiphany Eve, La Befana falls ill and must take off for a night, recruiting Scarafoni to help deliver all the toys that must go to the Italian children. No one but the toys knows that Scarafoni plans to auction off the toys to the highest bidder, which means that the toys won't make it to the children who have been good all year and therefore deserve them. The toys decide to deliver themselves: the story follows them as they struggle to avoid the heartless Scarafoni and to find their true homes.

Meanwhile, a young boy named Francesco wishes to receive as an Epiphany present the model of the Freccia Azzurra (Blue Arrow), the train where his late father used to work on. While Scarafoni is out looking for the escaping toys, a couple of burglars, Lesto and Scarpa, kidnaps Francesco and force him to sneak inside the Befana's shop and taking away all the money. Francesco, instead, uses the telephone inside the shop to call the police who arrest the burglars; Befana understands that Francesco is not involved in the attempted robbery and, with much gratitude, exonerates Francesco.

Of all the toys, the plush dog Spicciola wishes to be given to Francesco. During the evening, after a fight against Scarafoni that splits him from the group, Spicciola turns into a real dog. The next morning, Spicciola finds Francesco and the two bond immediately.

In the end, all the toys manage to deliver themselves to the children in their homes, but Scarafoni still has the money. However, everyone rushes to the toy shop and finds Scarafoni with the money and the people manage to get it back from him as he is arrested. Befana, after having found that her illness was provoked by Scarafoni himself, who gave her a light poison instead of medicine, hires Francesco as her new helper, joined by Spicciola.

== U.S. version ==
In 1997, the film was imported to the U.S. and released direct-to-video by Buena Vista Home Video, under the title How the Toys Saved Christmas (although, as shown in the previews, it was originally going to be titled The Toys Who Saved Christmas). It later aired on Cartoon Network in 2009 and on This TV in 2013.

In this version of the movie, Granny Rose is a Christmas witch who helps Santa Claus each year deliver toys to girls and boys around the world. But, one Christmas Eve, she gets a cold and hires a man named Mr. Grimm to help Santa deliver the toys to which Grimm agrees although he secretly plans to sell the toys to children whose parents are rich. Meanwhile, a young orphan named Christopher Winter writes a letter to Santa asking for a toy train called The Blue Arrow as a gift for his friend Charlie who lives with his Uncle Hank who works on the rails and then Christopher asks for his gift to be a special friend. However, when he goes to deliver his letter to Santa, he meets Mr. Grimm who tells him his belief that only kids who have money will get toys as opposed to poor kids like him. Hurt, Christopher leaves the shop.

Soon the toys in Granny Rose's shop, a toy dog named Jingles, an Indian Chief, three crew workers of the Blue Arrow train, two dolls named Holly and Polly, a teddy bear named Theodore, a Skipper in his boat, some Colored Pencils, a French General and his soldiers, some Construction Workers, a Brass Band, a Wooden Duck, a Plane Pilot and a Wizard all come to life and declare that Mr. Grimm will deliver them to the wrong children so they decide to deliver themselves to the right children using Jingles' sense of smell. The Wizard at first doesn't want to leave the shop finding the plan to be ridiculous but soon joins them. The group escape quickly as Mr. Grimm nearly catches them vowing to find them and sell them.

Along the way, the toys first drop Theodore off to a boy named Willie who's asking for a new toy to sleep with after giving his previous toy to his new baby brother. The Blue Arrow gets stuck in a puddle and Holly falls into the puddle and is about to drown but is soon rescued by the Skipper; the toys run away from a streetcar that was about to crush the Blue Arrow but one of the train's crew workers finally moves it out of the way. The General gets buried in the snow after losing his cannons causing the others to leave without him, but he is found by Mr. Potter, a kind night-watchman who gives him to his son Johnny as a present.

Meanwhile, Christopher goes to his job at a Cinema to make money so he can get a Christmas gift from Santa. He is secretly followed and captured by two robbers named Swifty and Rocko who force him to help them rob Granny Rose's shop and steal her money. After Granny Rose leaves her shop learning of Mr. Grimm's betrayal, Swifty and Rocko push Christopher through the window into the shop ordering him to open the door. However, Christopher does the right thing and uses Granny Rose's phone to call the police who show up quickly with Mr. Potter, but when they catch Christopher inside the shop, they misread the situation and think that he's the one who also robbed the store and arrest both him and the burglars in the process.

Meanwhile, Jingles loses his scent but soon recovers it with a help from the town's Statue and the toys celebrate only to be found by Mr. Grimm. Jingles manages to fight off Mr. Grimm giving the toys time to escape but Mr. Grimm throws him into the trash and manages to catch up to the toys, but the Statue manages to knock him out cold defeating him. When the toys realize Jingles is gone, they believe that he sacrificed himself to save them and they mourn the loss of their friend and then push on their journey where Holly and Polly are given to two sisters named Jenny and Lucy, the Duck is given to a kid named Toby, the Colored Pencils are given to a boy and draw pictures for him, much to his delight and Skipper is accidentally given to a girl named Samantha who he thought was a boy named Sam but luckily manages to escape and is found by Granny Rose who gives him to a real boy who lives near the sea. Finally, The Blue Arrow crew workers manage to make it to Charlie's house and proudly watch as Charlie stops a runaway train from crashing towards a collapsed tower and are honored to be his Christmas gift.

Meanwhile, Granny Rose goes to the police station having heard from Mr. Potter about her store getting robbed and clears Christopher's name as he is set free while Swifty and Rocko are incarcerated. Across town, Jingles is freed from the trash can by a friendly dog named Rascal and soon finds Christopher's scent knowing he's the boy meant for him and rushes off to find him.

Soon, Christopher finds Jingles and picks him up realizing he's the friend he asked for and then they witness Mr. Grimm getting arrested by the police for stealing the money from Granny Rose's shop and betraying her.

Christopher and Jingles go to meet Granny Rose at her shop and share how it was a great Christmas after all, and Granny Rose asks Christopher to help her deliver the toys next year to which he agrees.

The plot is otherwise very similar to the original Italian version, with some minor alterations. Rather than desiring the Blue Arrow for himself, Christopher Winter writes to Santa on behalf of his friend Charlie, a fellow orphan and the one who ultimately receives the train as his gift. For himself, Christopher asks for "one special friend", making his adoption of Jingles a fulfillment of his actual wish in this version.

The film also had some scenes from the original Italian release deleted or placed before other scenes, along with some music scores heard in the original release taken out in favor of new music.

== Cast ==
Character	Italian name	Original Italian V.O.	English dub (Miramax version)
Mr. Grimm	Scarafoni	Dario Fo	Tony Randall
Granny Rose	La Befana	Lella Costa	Mary Tyler Moore
Christopher Winter	Francesco	Alida Milana	Michael Caloz
Jingles the Dog	Spicciola	Monica Bertolotti	Sonja Ball
The Indian Chief	Penna d'Argento	Rino Bolognesi	Terrence Scammell
Skipper the Boat Captain	Capitano Mezzabarba	Vittorio Amandola	Richard Dumont
Holly and Polly the Dollies	Carlotta and Barbara	Ilaria Latini	Holly Gauthier-Frankel (Holly); Maggie Castle (Polly)
General Lajoie	Generale	Rodolfo Bianchi	Rick Jones
The Stubborn Wizard	Mago Testardo	Carlo Reali	Garry Jewell
Theodore the Wind-Up Teddy Bear	Orso Giallo	Roberto Stocchi	Michael Rudder
The Plane Pilot	Pilota D'Aereo	Marco Bresciani	Thor Bishopric
The Toy Crane Foreman	Caposquadra della Gru	Unknown Voice Actor	Mark Camacho
The Blue Arrow Train Crew	Il personale del treno della Freccia Azzurra	Oliviero Dinelli (Conductor); Christian Iansante (Train Driver); Unknown Voice Actor (Trainman)	Richard Dumont (Conductor); Arthur Holden (Train Driver); Michael Rudder (Trainman)
The Colored Pencils	Pastelli	Sergio Luzi (red and black); Pino Ammendola (green and blue); Neri Marcorè (yellow); Gaetano Varcasia (white and brown)	Bruce Dinsmore (red pencil); Rick Jones (yellow pencil); Terrence Scammell (green pencil); Arthur Holden (blue pencil); Richard Dumont (black pencil); Garry Jewell (brown pencil); Mark Camacho (white pencil)
The Wooden Duck	Anatra di Legno	Unknown Voice Actor	Rick Jones
Swifty and Rocko the Burglars	Lesto and Scarpa	Fabio Boccanera (Lesto); Roberto Pedicini (Scarpa)	Richard Dumont (Swifty); Mark Camacho (Rocko)
Mr. Tinker the Toy Maker	Mastro Romualdo	Nello Riviè	Walter Massey
Mr. Potter the Night Watchman	Arturo	Giorgio Borghetti	Bruce Dinsmore
Milford and Alfred the Twins	Carlo Alberto and Filippo Maria	Davide Perino (Carlo Alberto); Alessio De Filippis (Filippo Maria)	Jane Woods (Milford); Susan Glover (Alfred)
Jonesy the Twins' Maid	Domestica	Unknown Voice Actor	Joanna Noyes
The Chief of Police	Capo della Polizia	Pino Ferrara	Walter Massey
The Police Constable	Agente	Unknown Voice Actor	Terrence Scammell
The Ticket Seller	Venditore di Biglietti	Laura Cosenza	Joanna Noyes
The Coach Driver	Autista di Pullman	Unknown Voice Actor	Michael Rudder
Charlie	Unknown Name	Unknown Voice Actor	Michael Carloz
Uncle Hank	Unknown Name	Unknown Voice Actor	Mark Camacho
Samantha	Unknown Name	Unknown Voice Actor	Maggie Castle
The Town Stature	Statura	Michele Kalamera	Garry Jewell
Rascal the Stray Dog	Nerone	Unknown Voice Actor	Mark Camacho
Christopher's Dad	Papà	Unknown Voice Actor	Neil Shee
Santa Claus	Babbo Natale	Renzo Stacchi	Neil Shee

== Home media ==
Buena Vista Home Video released the film in its English-dubbed version on DVD in 2003. Echo Bridge Home Entertainment re-released the film on DVD in 2011. It was also re-released on DVD by Lionsgate in 2014 and Paramount Home Entertainment in 2020. It was also available on Paramount+.

== See also ==
- List of Christmas films
- Toy Story – a 1995 animated film
  - Toy Story 2 - a 1999 animated film
- The Christmas Toy – a 1986 Jim Henson's TV special
- The Brave Little Toaster – a 1987 animated film
  - The Brave Little Toaster to the Rescue – a 1999 animated film
  - The Brave Little Toaster Goes to Mars – a 1998 animated film
- The Little Engine That Could – a 1991 animated short film
- The Tangerine Bear – a 2000 animated film
