= My Goldfish Is Evil! =

- Created by: Nicolas J. Boisvert
- Directed by: Steven Majaury
- Starring: English dub: Stephane Blanchette; Sonja Ball; Jane Wheeler; Alyson Wener; Bruce Dinsmore; Lucinda Davis; Susan Glover; French dub: Stephane Blanchette; Sébastien Reding; Hugolin Chevrette; Johanne Garneau; Johanne Léveillé; Chantal Baril; Catherine Proulx-Lemay; Pascale Montreuil
- Composers: Mathieu LaFontaine; Apollo Studios
- Country of origin: Canada
- Original languages: English; French
- No. of seasons: 2
- No. of episodes: 26

Production
- Executive producers: Ghislain Cyr; Luc Wiseman
- Producers: Ghislain Cyr; Steven Majaury
- Running time: 24 minutes
- Production company: Sardine Productions

Original release
- Network: CBC Television; Télévision de Radio-Canada
- Release: 9 September 2006 – 15 December 2007

My Goldfish Is Evil! (French: Mon Poisson Rouge!, lit. 'My Goldfish!') is a Canadian animated television series that was created by Nicolas J. Boisvert. The series was produced by Sardine Productions for CBC Television and Télévision de Radio-Canada.

The show aired over two seasons, premiering in English-Canada on 9 September 2006, and concluding on 15 December 2007. In French-Canada, My Goldfish Is Evil! aired between 14 January 2007, and 30 March 2008.

== Overview ==
The series follows the adventures of 11-year-old Beanie, and his attempts to stop his pet goldfish, Admiral Bubbles, who is superintelligent and has dreams of bringing a reign of terror on the city and of world domination. Frequently, Bubbles escapes from his bowl in his attempts at mischief. With his mother and friends always failing to believe him, Beanie has to consistently deal with Bubbles on his own.

== Cast ==
=== Main ===
- Sonja Ball as Beanie
- Stephane Blanchette as Admiral Bubbles
- Jane Wheeler as Beanie's mother

=== Supporting ===
- Alyson Wener as Nia, Beanie's girlfriend
- Bruce Dinsmore as Elwood, one of Beanie's friends
- Sonja Ball as Nanna, Beanie's maternal grandmother and Standford, another of Beanie's friends
- Lucinda Davis as Desmona, friend of Nia and "frenemy" of Beanie, Elwood and Standford
- Susan Glover as Miss Dalee, Beanie's schoolteacher
- Bruce Dinsmore as Principal Block, Beanie's school principal

=== Minor and guest ===
- Ian Ingram as Super Eric
- Stephane Blanchette as Officer Swanson
- Bruce Dinsmore as Slappy the Clown
- Additional voices by Lucinda Davis, Bruce Dinsmore, Susan Glover, Rick Jones, John Koensgen, Alyson Wener, and Ellen David

== Production ==
My Goldfish Is Evil! was first presented at MIPCOM 2002 by Sardine Productions. In June 2003, CBC Television and VRAK.TV picked up the series for development. In February 2004, Super Écran and VRAK officially picked the series up, with a finalized CBC deal pending. At the time, the show was set to enter production in spring 2004, with the first season airing in September 2005. Later that month, CBC officially greenlit the series. Over the summer of 2005, Sardine reported that the series would begin production in October, with CBC and Télévision de Radio-Canada now attached as the sole broadcasters. The English debut was set for fall 2006 and a French one in January 2007. The series was officially renewed for a second season by both channels in April 2006.

International syndication rights to the series were initially awarded to S.K.A. Distribution in July 2004, a newly formed co-venture between Sardine Productions, Kutoka Interactive and Avanti Ciné Vidéo. Distribution, alongside licensing, merchandise, and home video rights were given to PorchLight Entertainment in April 2006. In 2012, Cyber Group Studios acquired the rights to the TV series, which they now distribute.

== Episodes ==
=== Season 1 (2006-07) ===
Series #	Title	Original release date
1	"The Monstro-Crane of Doom"	9 September 2006
2	"The Army of Sea Dudes"	16 September 2006
3	"School Trip to... Aquaworld!"	23 September 2006
4	"Space Command, We Have a Goldfish!"	30 September 2006
5	"Show & Tell"	7 October 2006
6	"Sweetheart's Dance!"	3 February 2007
7	"The Ice Roaches Cometh!"	14 October 2006
8	"Sewer Adventure!"	21 October 2006
9	"Goldfish Teriyaki!"	28 October 2006
10	"Rescued!"	18 November 2006
11	"Stinker!"	25 November 2006
12	"Forgetful Fish!"	4 November 2006
13	"Icing on the Cake!"	9 December 2006

=== Season 2 (2007) ===
Series #	Title	Original release date
14	"Secret Terractor!"	8 September 2007
15	"Lights, Camera, Goldfish!"	15 September 2007
16	"Ghostfish!"	22 September 2007
17	"The Great Outdoors!"	29 September 2007
18	"A Schoolplay Named Disaster!"	6 October 2007
19	"Grade-A Goldfish!"	20 October 2007
20	"Scoop Gets Scooped!"	13 October 2007
21	"Derailed!"	1 December 2007
22	"Basketboom!"	27 October 2007
23	"Fishy-Pox Pandemonium!"	3 November 2007
24	"Creature from the Black Fishbowl!"	17 November 2007
25	"20,000 Leagues Under the Fishbowl!"	11 November 2007
26	"Jetstream Adventure!"	15 December 2007

== International broadcast ==
In Australia, the series is currently airing on Toon-A-Vision. It debuted on ABC on 17 April 2007. The show made its British premiere on CITV on 1 September 2008. From 16 February 2009, onwards, it was moved back to an afternoon time slot on weekdays, broadcasting then new episodes, CITV continued to repeat all two series of the programme into the 2006-2009 era, the 2009-2013 era and even the 2013-2018 era until sometime in May 2015. In the United States, the show aired as part of the Kidmango block on MyFamily TV in 2009.

My Goldfish Is Evil! has also aired on Arutz HaYeladim in Israel, M-Net in Africa, JCCTV in the Middle East, TV5 Worldwide, MTV3 in Finland, POP TV in Slovenia, RTL Klub, M2 in Hungary, and Alshana in Africa.

== Home media ==
The complete series was released on DVD in English and French by Imavision in Canada. As of 2018, the series became available to be streamed on Tubi TV.

Name	Release date	Episodes	Region	Additional information
My Goldfish Is Evil! Season 1	9 September 2008	13	1	English version
My Goldfish Is Evil! Season 2	29 September 2009	13	1	English version
Mon Poison Rouge! Saison 1	29 September 2009	13	1	French version
Mon Poison Rouge! Saison 2	29 September 2009	13	1	French version
