= Thor Bishopric =

Canadian actor

- Born: Montreal, Quebec, Canada
- Occupations: Actor; writer
- Relatives: Kirsten Bishopric (sister)

Thor Bishopric is a Canadian actor and writer. He is a prominent member of ACTRA.

Bishopric has performed roles in television and film, and provided his voice for animated and puppet productions and several films for The National Film Board of Canada. He was also a writer on several shows and has worked as a voice director on several others.

Bishopric served as National President of ACTRA from 1999 to 2005.

== Early life ==
Bishopric was born in Montreal to Shirley JoAnn Bishopric (née Blöndal), a model and interior designer of Icelandic descent, and John Grenfell (né Bishopric), who was a radio announcer at the local Canadian Broadcasting Corporation radio station.

He is the younger brother of the late actress and voice actress Kirsten who was best known for voicing Zoycite, Emerald, Kaorinite, Telulu, and Badiyanu in the original English adaptation of Sailor Moon.

== Filmography ==
=== Live action ===
- Blackout
- Jacob Two-Two Meets the Hooded Fang
- Breaking All the Rules
- The Maharaja's Daughter
- Hallmark Hall of Fame
- April Morning
- The New Alfred Hitchcock Presents
- Looking for Miracles

=== Voice roles ===
- Saban's Adventures of Pinocchio
- Hans Christian Andersen's The Little Mermaid
- Heavy Metal
- C.L.Y.D.E.
- Young Robin Hood
- Wimzie's House
- For Better or For Worse
- Saban's Adventures of the Little Mermaid
- Animal Crackers
- Winx Club
- Anna Banana
- Kitty Cats
- Pig City
- Spirou
- Fred's Head
- Marsupilami
- Pet Pals
- My Life Me
- Tales from the Cryptkeeper
- How the Toys Saved Christmas
- Manon
- The Big Garage
- Woofy
- Pipi Pupu and Rosmary
- The Real Story of Itsy Bitsy Spider
- Flight Squad
- Sea Dogs
- A Bunch of Munsch
- The Country Mouse and the City Mouse Adventures
- Bob in a Bottle
- The Legend of White Fang
- The Little Flying Bears
- Ripley's Believe It or Not!
- A Miss Mallard Mystery
- Fennec
- Wunschpunsch
- Arthur
- Caillou
- Sagwa, the Chinese Siamese Cat
- The Secret World of Santa Claus
- The Adventures of Huckleberry Finn
- The Little Lulu Show
- The Bellflower Bunnies
- Papa Beaver's Storytime
- Sandokan
- Sharky and George
- Miss Pepperpot
- Calimero
- Cat Tales
- Patrol 03
- Journey to the West – Legends of the Monkey King.
- Lupo Alberto (season 2)
- 2 Nuts and a Richard!
- Harvey Girls Forever!
- Ollie's Pack
- Super Wish
- Ping and Friends
- Splinter Cell: Chaos Theory
- Zoobabu

=== Writer ===
- Kit and Kaboodle
- The Busy World of Richard Scarry
- The Little Lulu Show
- Young Robin Hood
- The Adventures of Paddington Bear
- Animal Crackers
- Caillou
- The Babaloos
- Back to Sherwood
- The Country Mouse and the City Mouse Adventures

=== Voice director ===
- Charley and Mimmo
- The Big Garage
- Leon in Wintertime
- A Cargo in Africa
- Pipi, Pupu and Rosemary
- Pinocchio
- Wushu Warrior
- Nelly and Caesar
- Anna Banana
