= Spaced Out =

- Also known as: Allô la Terre, ici les Martin
- Genre: Comedy; Science fiction Adventure
- Created by: Claude Lerist; Léon Nöel
- Directed by: Marc Perret
- Voices of: Mark Camacho; Ellen David; Eleanor Noble; Rick Jones; Bruce Dinsmore; Ricky Mabe; Sonja Ball; Daniel Brochu; Susan Glover; Terrence Scammell
- Theme music composer: Steve Wener
- Opening theme: "Spaced Out", performed by Fillmore King and Maude Buisson
- Ending theme: "Spaced Out" (Instrumental)
- Composer: Steve Wener
- Countries of origin: France; Canada; United Kingdom
- Original languages: French; English
- No. of seasons: 1
- No. of episodes: 26

Production
- Executive producers: Finn Arnesen & Daniel Lennard (for Cartoon Network Europe); Françoise Reymond (for Canal+); Eve Baron (for France 3)
- Producers: Christian Davin; Clément Calvet; Steven Ching
- Running time: 24 minutes
- Production companies: Alphanim; Tooncan; Cartoon Network Europe

Original release
- Network: Canal+ / France 3 (France); Cartoon Network (Europe); Vrak.TV (Canada)
- Release: January 7, 2002 – 2003

Spaced Out (known in French as Allô la Terre, ici les Martin) is an animated series, co-produced by Alphanim, Tooncan Productions and Cartoon Network Europe, in association with several other companies and television networks. The series had one season with 26 episodes.

The series aired on Cartoon Network in Europe.

== Synopsis ==
George Martin lives in a regular neighbourhood with his family and applies for a job in the apparently monopolistic company Krach Industries. Although they do not intend to hire him, his application is accidentally blown by the wind to the heap of selected candidates. This leads to George being hired as director of a secret orbital station (Operation SOS) housing sub-development, where he and his family have to live as an experiment started by Krach. When the Martins arrive at the station, they meet other people who Krach has also sent to live there. To their surprise, their neighbour and teacher who taught the Martins' kids on Earth is also on the station with her son. Later, they save a Russian cosmonaut who decides to live with them. And so, they continue living on the space station, occasionally having personal disputes, meeting aliens, and being monopolised by Krach.

== Characters ==
- George Martin (voiced by Mark Camacho) is the director of the space station. He is in charge of running the station and changing it from night to day. He denies the existence of extraterrestrial life, even when there's proof in front of him, he's always skeptical and holds by his theory. Even when they took over the station on his birthday, he only believes Monica hired a bunch of actors to give him a sort of role-playing adventure as a present.
- Monica Martin (voiced by Ellen David) is George's wife who loves order in her house. She also believes in aliens.
- Betty Martin (voiced by Eleanor Noble) is George's teenage daughter and a manic depressive. She likes music and seems to only enjoy catching up with friends which she has been completely deprived of upon arriving in the station. She's hinted to be very intelligent and sometimes shows rare compassion to her family.
- Benjamin Martin (voiced by Daniel Brochu) George's plump son and a cosmic super-hero fanatic. He is also fond of computers and technology. He shows a more rebellious side of him when he got sent to prison on the station once for stealing a comic his parents promised to buy him for his birthday, even if he did regret it.
- Gran (voiced by Sonja Ball) George's mother and the Martin kids' grandmother. She is a fitness fanatic and Monica and her have an antagonistic relationship.
- Fax and Goodgrief (both voiced by Rick Jones) the Martin kids' dog and cat, they almost always end up talking about the events that happened during the episode at the end of it, it is also hinted they may be aliens themselves; and Guy, Dumped by Krach to live on the station. He does all the work except those done by George. It is hinted most of the time that he's either a clone or a brainwashed individual sent to the station by Krach as a prototype for the "perfect multi-functional worker".
- Mrs. Schuman (voiced by Susan Glover) the Martin children's neighbour and teacher back on Earth and on the station.
- Bobby Schuman (voiced by Ricky Mabe) Mrs. Schuman's son. Although he keeps a friendly facade in front of the adults, he shows a very sadistic and manipulative side when he's with the other kids and sometimes his mother. As shown when he discreetly bullies Benjamin on earth. Relations with him and Benjamin have greatly improved since he was almost abducted on the station.
- Boris Malakoff (voiced by Bruce Dinsmore) a Russian/Soviet cosmonaut who decides to live on the station after crashing there. He becomes the new pilot of the Earth station shuttle. Boris is the only member of the principal cast who does not appear in all episodes, being introduced in episode 2.

== Episodes ==
Note: This list includes the original airdates of the pan-European Cartoon Network. Spaced Out premiered on January 7, 2002, on Cartoon Network UK & Ireland and on July 2, 2002, on Canal+ in France.

No.	Title	Written by	Original release date	Prod. code
1	"All Aboard!"	Yves Coulon	October 6, 2003	101
George is on the dole when a new job falls into his lap: Station Chief! The family is overjoyed! However, the station is in outer-space, far from Earth! What will they encounter all the way out there? Each one projects their worst fears and highest hopes. Enthusiasm wins out in the end. The Martins: wife, children, animals and even Gran take off for this new El Dorado. However, it turns out to be a suburban zone no bigger than a football field! Very quickly they are besieged with surprise after surprise. For example, there are the neighbors: the Schumans, alive and well! For the first time, Benjamin gets the chance to wreak revenge on Bobby who is captured by aliens. It is also in this episode that we meet Guy, dumped by Krach Industries as an extra gift!
2	"Death of an Alien!"	Patrick Galliano	October 7, 2003	102
Boris, a Russian astronaut forgotten in space, has drifted onto an unknown space station. Terror strikes in the Martin home: an alien has just entered the space lock!! George forges ahead on a reconnaissance tour and discovers Boris who saves him from being sucked out into space. The "alien" starts to meet the inhabitants of this station. The only problem is that Krach Industries refuse to house a new inhabitant for free. They kick him off with no further ado. The Martins are wracked with guilt but Boris, a superbly trained professional, manages to survive and make his way back to the station. Will he wreak revenge? No! Rather, he offers Krach Industries to become their new pilot of the Earth station shuttle free of charge! Deal! Boris can stay!
3	"Invasion"	Jean-François Henry	October 8, 2003	103
Betty hears voices. Nobody pays any attention as they are too busy trying to get rid of the cockroaches that have overrun the station. When the voice tells her that it is a Prince and that he and his are being persecuted, Betty quivers with romantic and militant passion. Her Prince has finally come but what a catastrophe! It's a cockroach! Betty persists nonetheless. Love overcomes the war between the two clans. Monica works out a truce. The engagement ceremony is quite the event! Gran and Boris want their weapons to do the talking but there is finally no need. Betty discovers that her Prince already has 38 wives! She goes into such a rage that all of the cockroaches immediately run off the station. straight to Earth!
4	"Boris Our Hero"	Claude Scasso	October 9, 2003	104
Attacked by an alien, Boris loses control of his shuttle. Benjamin saves him by starting up the automatic pilot. That's when the problems start! Boris had bought the wrong record for Betty, Benjamin is in admiration of Boris, "the alien destroyer" (alien which has hidden itself on the station) and George, jealous of their friendship, is irascible! In Benjamin's eyes, Boris is a hero! He can prove it too - with the flight video. Only then do we discover that the alien is nothing more than a teensy weensy spider! Benjamin is crushed! Boris and George go together to excuse themselves; while the spider is mutating into a real monster, who immediately leaves the planet, record in hand. That's what brought it here in the first place!
5	"George the Magnificent"	Jean-François Henry	October 13, 2003	105
As the Station Chief, George literally controls the skies. The day he realizes this, thanks to Gran's prodding, he imposes his point of view and ends up believing that he is God! There are those that are with him, those that are against him and the converted! Official portraits, ceremonies in honor of her son, rigged-up magic tricks, Gran does everything she can to maintain faith and fear. George's power is, after all, a little bit of her own. Monica puts up with her husband's excesses until he closes the school down to punish Ms. Schuman. It's their children who are suffering after all! With the help of Boris and Guy, Monica heads up a commando maneuver against Gran and George the Magnificent goes back to being simply George Martin!
6	"I Wanna Go Home"	Yves Coulon & Béatrice Marthouret	October 14, 2003	106
Monica is bored. Extra terrestrials are nowhere in sight and George is more and more distant. When she realizes that Krach Industries are using them as lab rats, she wants to go back to Earth immediately! George, with Benjamin's help, comes up with a thousand stratagems to keep his wife on the station. One evening, George comes home to find that Monica has gone! How is this possible? The shuttle is in the garage! Monica is living the close encounter of her dreams: encounters of the third kind that is! For "him", she agrees to stay on the station for a few more years. Monica never finds out that Krach Industries had concocted the whole thing but she is happy ad so is her family!
7	"George Investigates"	Ivan Calberac	October 15, 2003	107
Disappointed with his birthday present, Benjamin storms out. It's Sunday and there is nothing to do but get bored. When the supermarket door opens all by itself in front of him, Benjamin can't help but slip inside and steal the comic book he wanted. The next day, the theft is discovered. George puts on his detective outfit and starts investigating. Meanwhile, Bobby, armed with incriminating photos, is making Benjamin sing. Benjamin tries to retrieve the damning evidence. As for George, he has unmasked the culprit: his own son! A trial is set and George is forced to send Benjamin to jail. He does sneak candy in though and father and son reconcile.
8	"Monica at the Helm"	Franck Ekinci	October 16, 2003	108
George is stuck in bed with a lumbago. Monica is obliged to take over the commands! Completely out of her element in the control room, she battles to start up the basic functions! In the evening, when she gets home, there are still the children, dinner, etc. to take care of! Nobody seems to notice all of her efforts. Monica optimizes the station little by little though. Everybody notices except for George, who is jealous. Aliens are attracted to this harmonious environment and want to purify the station even further! What a catastrophe! Only Mrs. Schuman seems to be happy and she even prolongs George's lumbago with a secret starch potion! When Monica realizes what is going on, she sends everybody off home with a dose ten times as strong of the same potion!
9	"The Robinsons"	Marie-Christine & Frédéric Lenoir	October 20, 2003	109
A new family has just moved onto the station, right next door to the Martins: the Robinsons! They are incredibly nice. Could this be a plot to get rid of not only George but also all of the other inhabitants of the station?
10	"Cosmic Soup"	Marc Perrier	October 21, 2003	110
Boris has discovered a plant that produces giant vegetables. He brings back a specimen to the station. George's main worry is that the plant might be dangerous. The vegetables are delicious though. Noticing that there is a slump in their sales, Krach Industries come out to investigate. Catastrophe! Monica, Boris and the children have just left for the other planet where they meet the Garden Gnome gardener of the giant vegetable patch. George tries to impersonate everybody but Krach Industries cannot be fooled. They obtain the location of the abundant plant and confiscate it. The Giant Garden Gnome is forced to expatriate himself but not before giving Monica the seeds of the forbidden fruit that she grows behind George's back!
11	"A Question of Time"	Patrick Galliano	October 22, 2003	111
Bobby steals a remote control that Benjamin has just tinkered together. It is capable of slowing down and even reversing the flow of time! Very quickly, a few amusing experiments become dangerous events when Bobby, the pest, is at the controls of this powerful tool. He makes himself a few years older and bullies not only Benjamin but also, Betty, Guy, even Mrs. Schuman – his own mother! The station is no longer enough! Bobby wants to control the world! Monica no longer recognizes him, he's so old and she had always thought that he was such a nice boy! Bobby is however, really ready to go to the Earth. Cornered by Boris and George, the Martin children finally take care of Bobby themselves. But the remote control has drifted off into space.
12	"The Thing"	Marie-Christine & Frédéric Lenoir	October 23, 2003	112
George has taken quite a liking to a sort of orange egg, the 'Thing'. George is convinced that it's a cosmic being, not an extra terrestrial but a far removed ancestor! When the egg hatches, Monica and the children are very surprised. The thing babbles like a baby! However, it develops much more quickly than a human being and as it grows, so does its paranoia. Will George face up to the ugly truth about his adoptive son? After a horrible battle, George is forced to disconnect his protege himself. It was in fact an intelligent toy that Krach Industries had been "testing" before marketing it!
13	"The Unteachables"	Jean-François Henry	October 27, 2003	113
The Martin children have disastrous grades. Doubtful of Mrs. Schuman's methods, Monica opens her own school. Playing up to her emotional side to the hilt, Betty, Benjamin and Bobby raise the stakes higher and higher. The get classes about television; on how to take naps; finally, they manage to obtain no school at all! All anarchy has broken loose! Even more so that bio-ads (contagious publicity slogans) have polluted the station. In fact, it's playing hooky that winds up getting the children back to school. While dissecting a bio-ad, Benjamin persuades himself to do better in school and winds up infecting the other children with the same illness!
14	"All About Gran"	Yves Coulon, Fanny Hurtrel & Jean Philippe Robin	October 28, 2003	114
This is where we find out that Gran has dentures, practices Kung-fu and rides scooters. We learn all sorts of other stuff as well. While George is preparing Springtime down to the smallest details (he's pollinating for cripes sakes!) he discovers a box that Gran had stashed away. He glimpses the headlines of an article that convinces him that he is not her real son. Gran's obstinate silence only confirms his worst fears. After the failure of a commando mission to steal the box, George sees only one solution, going to Earth to look for his real mother. Gran prevents him at the last minute from getting into a shuttle accident. The situation as it stands forces her to tell him the truth. George is a test-tube baby! The ultimate in in-vitro technology! George keels over. It takes all of Gran's skills to get George to come round: test tube babies are so fragile!
15	"Holiday Madness"	Yves Coulon	October 29, 2003	115
Using the feeble excuse of wanting to film the first family Christmas in space, Krach Industries exiles an employee onto the station. Wanting to impress the film director, the inhabitants outdo each other in decoration, regional traditions, the works! George even decides to set off fireworks. The explosion however produces such a shock wave that a meteorite is deviated from its trajectory and aims itself directly at the station! Panic on board! George tries to remedy the situation. The director takes off in his shuttle leaving the inhabitants to their dire fate. In his rush to get away, he crashes into the meteorite and deviates it once again. The station is saved. After all the excitement and stress, the Martins really do deserve to meet Santa Claus! And here he is with a sled filled to the brim with presents (all from Krach industries obviously!) A true Christmas tale!
16	"Pigs in Space"	Jean-François Henry	October 30, 2003	116
How does one recycle space station trash? Krach Industries hadn't thought of that did they? They therefor, insist that George find the answer. Each encourages George in his own way: reprimands, protests! Will the Martins continue to be pigs in space? An unknown and mysterious "Robin Space" refuses to allow this to happen. He demands a clean station! George has no choice in the matter, Robin is trailing him - even into his own bed! George has got to change his position! Robin Space is in fact no other than Benjamin, Betty, and Bobby who have formed an activist group. With the trash, they build a huge message denouncing Krach Industries - a message that can be seen all the way from Earth. There's a good chance that Krach Industries is going to get down to cleaning very soon!
17	"Desperately Seeking Schuman"	based on an idea by: Anne-Marie Perrotta & Tean Schultz teleplay by: Yves Coulon	November 3, 2003	117
Mrs. Schuman doesn't have a man in her life and this is a source of suffering. To such an extent that Monica has decided that it is her mission in life to find one for her friend. Mrs. Schuman's personal tragedy rapidly becomes a burlesque comedy when all of the station's inhabitants decide to help her out! With so much good will, Mrs. Schuman isn't going to be single much longer!
18	"Blackout"	Franck Ekinci	November 4, 2003	118
On that particular day, Monica reproaches George for neglecting her. Shameful! George is so wrought up over her remark that he doesn't pay attention to the products he is handling. The station is immediately awash with an unbreathable gas! There is no hiding place except in the tunnels. The station inhabitants organize their lives underground, in the dark, the hunger, the proximity! To top it all off, regularly timed grunts terrify the entire camp! If Benjamin finds the whole thing wildly exciting, not everyone shares in his excitement. All of a sudden, in a bend of the tunnel appears Ricardo Mascarpone! He is one of the station's construction workers, left behind by Krach Industries at the end of the project. He isn't complaining, he feels at home here. Thanks to him and his intimate knowledge of the station's workings, the gas is evacuated. And now, Mrs. Schuman has an underground gentleman caller.
19	"Public Enemy #1"	Jason Bogdaneris, Jean françois Henry & Sarah Musgrave	November 5, 2003	119
The station is pretty small and a dog has needs. Running up and down the streets is just not enough for an active dog. Fax therefore plays, tears, bites, dirties. In sum the Martins, Boris and Mrs. Schuman have had their fill of this particular tornado! Will Fax be sent off the planet?
20	"The Man in the Plexiglas Mask"	Patrick Galliano	November 6, 2003	120
George's half-brother has landed on the station! The problem is that no one is supposed to know where the Martin's are: who then is this Lucius? As if that were not enough, here is George filled to the hilt with brotherly love! Thank goodness Gran is there, watching over them all.
21	"Charge!"	Jean-François Henry	November 10, 2003	121
George has left to make the sun rise without his slippers and gets a gigantic electrical shock. He falls senseless to the ground. Whether or not he will be repatriated becomes a pressing question. Monica, the children, the neighbors are beside themselves. What would George have wanted under such circumstances? George meanwhile has met his guardian angel, sent to accompany him through his "transfer" to Heaven. George doesn't want to go! Like a kid who refuses to go to bed, he invariably finds something that he needs to do, stealing those precious extra minutes. Time enough to find a way to get back to life.
22	"Black Hole"	Patrick Galliano	November 11, 2003	122
Benjamin walks into a black hole and finds himself jettisoned onto an orbital space station where a family lives: the Martins. What's changed, you asked? Well these Martins don't have a son! Being a stranger, Benjamin is faced with the prospect of being thrown to Big Buhbones, a dog six times bigger than Fax!
23	"Downsized"	Jean Marc Lenglen	November 12, 2003	123
Operation SOS (secret orbital station) is a success. In order to make ever more profits, Krach Industries has decided to reduce the number of employees on the station. The first to go is Guy! George finds himself obliged to take over his duties along with his own! Things get worse when George must also take over the responsibilities of his best friend, Boris.
24	"The Learning Machine"	Jean-Marc Lenglen	November 13, 2003	124
At school, Benjamin is coming up with straight A's. Betty is suspicious of his new intellect. She discovers his secret: a black, rectangular stone that can increase knowledge while one sleeps: the philosopher's stone. The children however ignore that this learning machine was brought there by a super-evolved dog to thank Fax for having conquered outer space! The control box must be found for no one yet knows the side effects on the human brain.
25	"Hostile Takeover"	Franck Ekinci	November 17, 2003	125
The station has definitely never been so populated – if only the inhabitants were human! Aliens have invaded, subjugated and annexed the Martin's platform thinking that it is really Earth! George mustn't find out that they are really extra terrestrials: it could kill him! As for the Aliens, they must never know that the real Earth is that blue planet over there! The situation is critical but filled with misunderstandings and mayhem - a regular alien comedy.
26	"Incubated"	Jean-François Henry	November 18, 2003	126
A fluorescent gelatinous substance has infiltrated the station. It is looking for a prey, sneaks up. Whoosh! It has just streamed into Guy through his ears. He first becomes cynical then noticeably nasty and mean! But Guy has far too much self-control. George on the other hand is an ideal victim! Whoosh! The gelatinous substance takes over George's brain and he becomes downright dangerous!! Evil has crept onto the station. How does one get rid of it now without harming George? Monica and the others barricade themselves against the onslaught.
