= Peter Miller (actor) =

Canadian actor (born 1968)

- Born: 1968 (age 57–58); Chibougamau, Québec, Canada.
- Education: University of the Pacific; Neighborhood Playhouse School of the Theatre
- Occupation: Actor
- Height: 1.88 m (6 ft 2 in)

Peter Miller (born 1968) is a Canadian actor.

His credits have included the television series MVP, Virginie and Lance et Compte, and the films Mambo Italiano and Rouge sang. Miller portrayed Galeazzo Maria Sforza in the 2009 short-film series Assassin's Creed: Lineage.

Miller graduated from the Neighborhood Playhouse in Manhattan, New York City. He was born in Chibougamau, Quebec and spent part of his childhood in the Bahamas. His mother is of French descent and his father is of Irish descent. He is anglophone-francophone bilingual.

He is also a former professional football player in the Canadian Football League. He was drafted in the seventh round of the 1992 CFL draft by the Saskatchewan Roughriders and played six seasons in the CFL with the Roughriders, BC Lions, and Toronto Argonauts as a linebacker; he played college football for Pacific.

== Filmography ==
=== Film ===
| Year | Title | Role | Notes |
|---|---|---|---|
| 2003 | Mambo Italiano | Nino Paventi | Co–Lead Role |
| 2004 | The Five of Us | Thibodeau | |
| 2005 | En parallèle | Lover | short |
| 2006 | Lotto 6/66 | Kevin Stamper | short |
| 2008 | Transit | Santiago's father | |
| 2010 | Die | Tom | |
| 2010 | Lance et compte | Mike Ludano | |
| 2011 | Angle mort | Miguel | |
| 2013 | Rouge Sang | Pierre | |
| 2013 | Betty and Coretta | Actor | |
| 2013 | Maïna | Manutabi | |
| 2013 | White House Down | Norad Commander | |
| 2015 | Every Thing Will Be Fine | Ice Fishing Man #1 | |
| 2017 | Venus (2017 film) | Max | |
| 2020 | Jeep Boys | Cormac | Short |

=== Series ===
| Year | Title | Role | Notes |
|---|---|---|---|
| 1996 | Virginie | Stéphane Lesieur | Guest Role |
| 2001 | Law & Order | Bartender | Episode 11x14 |
| 2002 | Le dernier chapitre: La Suite | Salvatore | Mini–Series; 6 episodes |
| 2003 | The Last Chapter II: The War Continues | Salvatore | |
| 2004 | Lance et compte: La reconquête | Mike Ludano | 10 episodes |
| 2004 | Fortier | Jim Quitish | Episode 5x06–5x08 |
| 2004 | Ciao Bella | Elio Lanza | Main Cast; 13 episodes |
| 2006 | Casino | Tiger | |
| 2006 | Lance et compte: La revanche | Mike Ludano | 10 episodes |
| 2008 | MVP | Damon Trebuchet | 10 episodes |
| 2009 | The Foundation | Daniel Jett Copper | Episode 1x05 |
| 2009 | Lance et compte: Le grand duel | Mike Ludano | 9 episodes |
| 2012 | Lance et compte: La déchirure | Mike Ludano | 7 episodes |
| 2017 | Bellevue | Mr. Debessage | Episode 1x05 |
| 2017 | 19-2 | Petra | Episode 4x05 |
| 2018 | Hubert et Fanny | Eliseo | Episode 1x09–1x12 |
| 2019 | The Expanse | Bartender | Episode 4x02 |
| 2019–2022 | District 31 | François Labelle | 50 episodes recurring role |
| 2023–Present | Indéfendable | Cédric Boileau | |

== See also ==
- Hero and the Terror (1988 film)
