= 40 Is the New 20 =

2009 Canadian comedy film by Simon Boisvert

- Directed by: Simon Boisvert
- Written by: Simon Boisvert
- Starring: Pat Mastroianni; Claudia Ferri; Bruce Dinsmore; Diana Lewis
- Cinematography: Jacques F. Bernier
- Edited by: Renaud Rouverand
- Music by: Benoît Tilizien
- Production company: Productions 1984
- Release date: May 15, 2009 (Toronto)
- Running time: 93 minutes
- Country: Canada
- Language: English

40 Is the New 20 is a 2009 Canadian comedy film written and directed by Simon Boisvert and starring Pat Mastroianni, Claudia Ferri, Bruce Dinsmore and Diana Lewis.

== Cast ==
- Pat Mastroianni as Gary
- Claudia Ferri as Jennifer
- Bruce Dinsmore as Simon
- Lynne Adams as Pat
- Diana Lewis as Cindy

== Reception ==
The film has a 33% rating on Rotten Tomatoes, based on six reviews with an average rating of 4.04/10.
