= Ovide and the Gang =

1980s animated television series

- L-R: Groaner, Saphron, Ovide and Polo
- Genre: Animated series
- Directed by: Raymond Burlet; Jean Sarault
- Voices of: Thor Bishopric; Terrence Scammell; Dean Hagopian; A.J. Henderson
- Theme music composer: Carlos Leresche
- Countries of origin: Canada; Belgium
- Original languages: French; English
- No. of seasons: 1
- No. of episodes: 65

Production
- Producers: Jacques Pettigrew; Jacques Vercruyssen; Violette Vercruyssen
- Running time: 30 minutes
- Production companies: CinéGroupe; Odec Kid Cartoons

Original release
- Network: Télévision de Radio Canada
- Release: October 17, 1987 – January 7, 1989

La Bande à Ovide, a.k.a. Ovide and the Gang, is a 1980s animated comedy TV series produced by Canadian studio CinéGroupe (who also produced Mega Babies, Sharky & George and The Little Flying Bears) with the co-production of Belgium's Odec Kid Cartoons.

It aired on Télévision de Radio Canada from October 17, 1987 to January 7, 1989 and also goes by the names Ovide Video and Ovide's Video Show. The series gained popularity in the United Kingdom when the BBC broadcast the series as part of their Children's BBC programming strand from August 1987, and stayed with the BBC until Spring 1992, before switching to Channel 4.

The characters were created and designed by Bernard Godi in cooperation with Belgian comic artist and animator Nic Broca, who had previously designed the Snorks for SEPP.

== Synopsis ==
The show stars a blue platypus named Ovide who lives on a non-descript South Seas island, where he has adventures with his friends and thwarts Cy and Bobo, the show's villains.

== Main characters ==
- Ovide (voiced by Thor Bishopric): A blue platypus who is the main character of the series. The unofficial leader of the group, he is also smart, responsible and kind.
- Saphron (voiced by Terrence Scammell): A yellow platypus who is Ovide's cousin, he is a good cook and gardener.
- Polo (voiced by Terrence Scammell): A feisty red lizard who always carries around a broom. The island's janitor and the "tough guy" of the group, he is always trying and failing to catch Woody, a destructive woodworm.
- Groaner (voiced by Dean Hagopian): A white toucan who is one of Ovide's friends, his name comes from the fact that he is always telling weak jokes which make people groan.
- Doe, Rae & Mi: A trio of koalas who are always shown sitting on branches or the couch. Their names come from the first three solfège syllables, and they visually represent the three wise monkeys: Doe wears headphones listening to music (Hear no Evil), Rae wears sunglasses (See no Evil), and Mi almost always covers his mouth, and sometimes hiccups (Speak no Evil).
- Matilda: A female kangaroo. Not originally from the island, she mistook the others for cannibals and hid from them, but then warmed up to them. She is skilled with herbal remedies and with the boomerang. She is first seen in episode 18.
- Cy Sly (voiced by A.J. Henderson): A vain, scheming, megalomaniacal python who is the primary antagonist of the series, he is jealous of Ovide and wishes to overthrow him and gain control of the island.
- Bobo (voiced by Terrence Scammell): Cy's bumbling, keel-billed toucan minion and only friend, he refers to Cy as "Boss". Despite his association with Cy, he has a good heart and wishes Ovide and his friends no ill-will. Bobo is also let off the hook a lot, unlike Cy who always suffers the consequences.
- Woody: A mischievous woodworm who tunnels around the island, he is known to alter the state of bowling games and gnaw holes into the base of Ovide's home. He is in constant conflict with Polo.
- Alvin: A blue three-toed sloth who lives in the forest of the island, his role in the cartoon is (more often than not) very minor and the only word he can pronounce is "Aye".
- Newscaster Lady: A pink-haired platypus whose name has not been revealed, she is the constantly-occurring face on television and the information she provides is beneficial to Ovide (and even Cy at times).

== Role of television in Ovide ==
Television plays an important role in this series. In every episode, Ovide and his friends are watching a programme. Ovide carries a brown briefcase which contains a portable TV set and there is a wandering TV on the island that approaches the characters at crucial moments and provides information important to the plot. Every time Cy sees the TV, he apparently becomes entranced by it.

== Episodes ==
No.	Title	Original release date
1	"The Case of the Disappearing Hens"	October 17, 1987
2	"Cy and the Solo Sailor"	October 24, 1987
3	"The Ghostly Galleon"	October 31, 1987
4	"The Prophet"	November 7, 1987
5	"The Creature of the Cave"	November 14, 1987
6	"The Treasure of the Endzones"	November 21, 1987
7	"The Island Games"	November 28, 1987
8	"Cy the Sorcerer"	December 5, 1987
9	"Spellbound"	December 12, 1987
10	"Great Slave Cake"	December 19, 1987
11	"Hunter!"	December 26, 1987
12	"Boom Boom Beefcake"	January 2, 1988
13	"A Jocular Genie Named Jack"	January 9, 1988
14	"Run for Your Lives!"	January 16, 1988
15	"Platypus Dam"	January 23, 1988
16	"Hi-Tech Treasure"	January 30, 1988
17	"Rex on the Rampage"	February 6, 1988
18	"The Australian Amazon"	February 13, 1988
19	"A Joke in Poor Taste"	February 20, 1988
20	"Cy, the Prince of Darkness"	February 27, 1988
21	"The Siren's Song"	March 5, 1988
22	"Just for Laughs"	March 12, 1988
23	"The Invincible Strength Potion"	March 19, 1988
24	"The Big Chill"	March 26, 1988
25	"The Island Rally"	April 2, 1988
26	"The Crimson Tide"	April 9, 1988
27	"Kimmy Chameleon"	April 16, 1988
28	"Ole"	April 23, 1988
29	"The Secret of the Crypt"	April 30, 1988
30	"Sudden Guests"	May 7, 1988
31	"All You Need Is Love"	May 14, 1988
32	"The Long-Life Battery Blues"	May 21, 1988
33	"When Friends Fall Out"	May 28, 1988
34	"The Great Chef"	June 4, 1988
35	"A Tail of a Crypt"	June 11, 1988
36	"If Only ..."	June 18, 1988
37	"Cy Lays an Egg"	June 25, 1988
38	"Backward to Victory"	July 2, 1988
39	"A Small Problem"	July 9, 1988
40	"Stuck, Stranded and Swamped"	July 16, 1988
41	"The Curse of Doctor Voodoo"	July 23, 1988
42	"Black Gold"	July 30, 1988
43	"Spirit, Are You There?"	August 6, 1988
44	"Winner Take All"	August 13, 1988
45	"The Nectar of Happiness"	August 20, 1988
46	"A Peculiar Plague"	August 27, 1988
47	"Video Villain"	September 3, 1988
48	"His Own Worst Enemy"	September 10, 1988
49	"Vanishing Act"	September 17, 1988
50	"The Cold War"	September 24, 1988
51	"Shark!"	October 1, 1988
52	"Karate Chaos"	October 8, 1988
53	"Buried Treasure"	October 15, 1988
54	"The Chicken Charmer"	October 22, 1988
55	"Bringing Up Baby"	October 29, 1988
56	"Bouncing Bath-Tub"	November 5, 1988
57	"Sergeant Bobo"	November 12, 1988
58	"Friday the 13th"	November 19, 1988
59	"The Zone Phone Company"	November 26, 1988
60	"The Trying Time"	December 3, 1988
61	"The Virus"	December 10, 1988
62	"Second Childhood"	December 17, 1988
63	"The Great Wall"	December 24, 1988
64	"The Island of the Green Rock"	December 31, 1988
65	"Unnamed 65th Episode"	January 7, 1989

A number of these episodes were released on VHS by Celebrity Home Entertainment's "Just for Kids" sublabel, hosted by Noel C. Bloom Jr. during the late 1980s and (assumingly) early 1990s.
