= CinéGroupe =

Canadian animation studio

CinéGroupe Corporation
- Industry: Animation
- Founded: 1974; 52 years ago
- Founder: Jacques Pettigrew
- Headquarters: 1010 Rue Sainte-Catherine E, 6th floor, Montreal, Quebec, Canada
- Key people: Jacques Pettigrew (President, CEO); Michel Lemire (Creative Director); Christian Garcia (CGI Supervisor)
- Owner: Jacques Pettigrew
- Number of employees: 400 (2005)
- Parent: Cinepix Film Properties (1980–1997); Lions Gate Entertainment (1998–2002, minority stake)

CinéGroupe Corporation (or simply CinéGroupe and formerly known as Ciné-Groupe, stylized in all caps) is a Canadian animation studio and production company based in Montreal, Quebec. The company was founded in 1974. Its shows and films have been seen in over 125 countries.

Notable franchises from CinéGroupe include: What's with Andy?, The Kids from Room 402, and Pig City (all aired on Fox Family, now known as Freeform); the animated Tripping the Rift (Sci Fi, now known as Syfy); and PBS' Sagwa, the Chinese Siamese Cat. With Sony Wonder, it has produced Mega Babies (also aired on Fox Family), as well as a direct-to-video feature, Lion of Oz (a prequel to both the L. Frank Baum work, and the 1939 film). In the 2000s, the company produced the animation for a sequel to the 1981 cult classic Heavy Metal for Columbia TriStar Home Video titled Heavy Metal 2000, premiered on Starz in the United States and on Teletoon in Canada from 2001 onwards. In 2004, it made Pinocchio 3000, a sci-fi retelling of the Italian tale. Galidor: Defenders of the Outer Dimension, a live-action fantasy series for teenagers, has also been produced by the company. The company also cooperated with the toy maker MGA Entertainment in the creation of Bratz: Starrin' and Stylin', a 2D-animated direct-to-video film based on MGA's Bratz line of fashion dolls.

== History ==
CinéGroupe was founded in 1974 by Jacques Pettigrew in Montreal, Quebec.

In August 1998, Fox Family Worldwide purchased a 20% minority stake in the company although CinéGroupe remained as a subsidiary of Lions Gate Entertainment, which owned 40% of the studio.

In January 2001, the studio formed a production and distribution joint-venture with Telescene, with the first production under it being the third series of Big Wolf on Campus. CinéGroupe would hold an 80% stake while Telescene would hold 20%. That July, Lions Gate's ownership of the studio was confirmed to have been reduced to 30%, with Lions Gate president Andre Link having 50% of its voting stock, leading to the studio being a partner of Lions Gate instead of a subsidiary. In September, the company formed a division called CinéGroupe Image to expand to live-action programming.

In October 2002, the company united with the music label Les Disques Star Records Inc. to create a home video distributor called CinéGroupe Star. The following month, the company announced the production of Britney Spears cartoon, but the project never came to fruition.

Between 2002 and 2003, CinéGroupe developed three video games for the Game Boy Advance: Tom and Jerry in Infurnal Escape, Dora the Explorer: The Search for Pirate Pig's Treasure (both 2002 and published by NewKidCo), and Dora the Explorer: Super Spies (2003; published by Gotham Games). By December 2003, Lions Gate Entertainment's stake in the studio was reduced further to 29.4%.

In January 2004, the CinéGroupe Star joint venture with Star Records was folded. The same month, in the wake of production cuts, the studio filed for a protection order from its creditors with the Quebec Superior Court.

In 2018, CinéGroupe co-produced Tshakapesh, a 2D-animated series based on an Innu legend, which has aired on APTN and Radio-Canada. Two edutainment IPs are currently being developed by CinéGroupe, aiming at raising awareness about water preservation and environmental protection. CinéGroupe is also viewing revivals and revitalization of their old properties.

== Library ==
=== Distribution ===
CinéGroupe is currently partnered with HG Distribution (Henry Gagnon Distribution) for the distribution of its library, but only a portion of CinéGroupe's catalogue is listed for distribution by HG. Several notable titles such as Bad Dog, Daft Planet, and The Tofus are not listed, as are live-action series, such as Big Wolf on Campus.

=== Series ===
==== Released ====
Title	Year(s)	Production partner	Network	Notes
Ultra 7	1985	CINAR Films, Turner Program Services	TNT	Production services
Ovide and the Gang	1987–89	Odec Kid Cartoons	Télévision de Radio-Canada	
Sharky & George	1990–92	Label 35, Les Films de la Perrine	Canal+ (France); Canal Famille (Canada)	
The Little Flying Bears	1990–91	Zagreb Film	Family Channel/Télévision de Radio-Canada (Canada); HRT (Croatia)	
Zoe and Charlie	1993	Tele Images		
Spirou	1993–95	Dupuis	Family Channel/Canal Famille (Canada); Canal J/TF1 (France)	
What a Cartoon!	1995	Hanna-Barbera, Cartoon Network Studios	Cartoon Network	Post production sound services on the short The Adventures of Captain Buzz Cheeply in... "A Clean Getaway" for Buzz Image Group
Sea Dogs: Adventures on the Seven Seas	1995	Les Films de la Perrine	Family Channel (Canada); France 2 (France)	
The Magical Adventures of Quasimodo	1996	Tele Images, Ares Films, Hearst Entertainment	Family Channel/Télévision de Radio-Canada (Canada); France 3 (France)	
Princess Sissi	1997–98	Saban International Paris	Rai Uno (Italy); France 3 (France); Das Erste (Germany); Télévision de Radio-Canada (Canada)	
The Secret World of Santa Claus	1997	Marathon Productions	France 3 (France); Télé-Québec (Canada)	
Kit & Kaboodle	1998	Les Productions Raggamuffins, MC Producciones	Télévision de Radio-Canada	
Team SOS	1998	Les Films de la Perrine	Télé-Québec	
Bad Dog	1998–2000	Saban Entertainment	Teletoon (Canada); Fox Family (US)	
Mega Babies	1999–2000	Landmark Entertainment Group, Sony Wonder Television	Teletoon (Canada); Fox Family (US)	
The Kids from Room 402	1999–2001	Saban Entertainment	Teletoon (Canada); Fox Family (US)	
Jim Button	1999–2000	Saban International Paris	Télévision de Radio-Canada (Canada); TF1 (France); Der Kinderkanal (Germany)	
Wunschpunsch	2000–01	Saban International Paris	Télévision de Radio-Canada (Canada); TF1 (France)	
Big Wolf on Campus	2001–02	Saban Entertainment	YTV/Vrak.TV (Canada); ABC Family (US)	season 3, as CinéGroupe Image
What's with Andy?	2001–07	Saban Entertainment (season 1), SIP Animation (season 2)	Teletoon (Canada); ABC Family (US; season 1); Super RTL (Germany; seasons 2–3)	
Sagwa, the Chinese Siamese Cat	2001–02	Sesame Workshop	PBS Kids (US); TVOKids/Knowledge Network/Télévision de Radio-Canada (Canada)	
The Ripping Friends	2001–02	Spümcø, Cambium, Animagic	Fox Kids (US); Teletoon (Canada)	Distributor
Edward	2002–03		Teletoon	
Galidor: Defenders of the Outer Dimension	2002	Tom Lynch Company, The Lego Group	YTV (Canada); Fox Kids (US)	
Pig City	2002–04	AnimaKids, Red Rover Studios	Teletoon (Canada); Fox Kids Europe; ProSieben (Germany)	
Daft Planet	2002		Teletoon	
Seriously Weird	2002	Granada Kids	YTV (Canada); CITV (UK)	
Tripping the Rift	2004–07	Film Roman	Sci Fi (US); Space/Teletoon (Canada)	
11 Somerset	2004		Télé-Québec	
The Tofus	2004–05	SIP Animation	Jetix; France 3 (France); Teletoon (Canada)	
Charlie Jade	2005		Space	
Wick Wick	2011	Rai Fiction	Rai 2 (Italy)	
Tshakapesh Superhero	2020		APTN	

==== Upcoming ====
Title	Year(s)	Co-production with	Network	Notes
#Shared	TBA			TBA
Angry Jesus	TBA			TBA
Dark Tales	TBA			TBA
Mystery Squad	TBA			TBA
Parrot	TBA			TBA
Raising Maddie	TBA			TBA
Sharky & George reboot	TBA			
Splishaboo	TBA			TBA
Splish Splash	TBA			

=== Films ===
Title	Release date	Co-production with	Note
Jean-du-Sud autour du monde	1983		
Just a Game	May 22, 1983	Astral Films (distributor)	
Jerome's Secret	September 23, 1994	Citadel Films; National Film Board of Canada	
Heavy Metal 2000	July 10, 2000	Columbia Tristar Home Video (distributor)	
Lion of Oz	September 26, 2000	Sony Wonder (distributor)	
Edge of Madness	January 1, 2002	Credo Entertainment, Gregorian Films, Lions Gate Films (distributor)	
Student Seduction	May 5, 2003	Lions Gate Television, Carlton International (Distributors)	as CinéGroupe Image
Pinocchio 3000	February 9, 2004	Filmax, AnimaKids, Christal Films (distributor)	
Bratz: Starrin' & Stylin'	August 3, 2004	MGA Entertainment, Toon City Animation, 20th Century Fox Home Entertainment (distributor)	
Sindbad and the Wind of Destiny	TBA		In production

=== TV specials ===
- David Copperfield (1993)
- Eye of the Wolf (1998)

=== Video games ===
- Tom and Jerry in Infurnal Escape (2002, published by NewKidCo)
- Dora the Explorer: The Search for Pirate Pig's Treasure (2002, published by NewKidCo)
- Dora the Explorer: Super Spies (2003, published by Gotham Games)
