= I Will Not Starve =

2022 Italian-Canadian drama film

- Italian: Non morirò di fame
- Directed by: Umberto Spinazzola
- Written by: Umberto Spinazzola; Fabrizio Bozzetti; Massimo De Angelis
- Produced by: Alessandro Borrelli
- Starring: Michele Di Mauro; Jerzy Stuhr; Chiara Merulla; Claudia Ferri
- Cinematography: Matteo Bosi
- Production companies: La Sarraz Pictures; Productions Megafun; Rai Cinema
- Distributed by: Filmoption International
- Release date: 24 November 2022 (Terni)
- Running time: 109 minutes
- Countries: Italy; Canada
- Language: Italian

I Will Not Starve (Italian: Non morirò di fame) is an Italian-Canadian drama film, directed by Umberto Spinazzola and released in 2022. The film stars Michele Di Mauro as Pier, a formerly successful chef who, following the failure of his restaurant, becomes homeless on the streets of Turin, where he befriends Granata (Jerzy Stuhr), another homeless man who teaches him how to survive on the wasted food thrown out by shops and restaurants, while simultaneously trying to reconnect with his estranged daughter Anna (Chiara Merulla) before she leaves to spend a year studying in Montreal.

The cast also includes Claudia Ferri, Riccardo Lombardo, Olivia Manescalchi, Paolo Mazzini and Fabrizio Odetto.

The film premiered on 24 November 2022 at the Terni Film Festival in Italy, before going into commercial release in early 2023. It had its Canadian premiere at the 2023 Cinéfest Sudbury International Film Festival.
