= Tom and Jerry in Infurnal Escape =

2003 video game

- Developer: CinéGroupe Interactive
- Publishers: NA: NewKidCo; EU: Ubi Soft
- Platform: Game Boy Advance
- Release: NA: 13 March 2003; EU: 2003
- Genre: Platform
- Mode: Single-player

Tom and Jerry in Infurnal Escape is a 2003 video game for the Game Boy Advance. The game was the first of three video game titles developed by Canadian animation studio CinéGroupe, with the title published by NewKidCo. The game is a platformer using characters licensed from the Tom and Jerry animated series, with players guiding Tom through fifteen levels to escape the underworld. Upon release, Infurnal Escape received a mixed reception, with reviewers praising the game's visual presentation but critiquing the game's control scheme and use of traps.

== Gameplay ==
Gameplay screenshot

Infurnal Escape is a platformer in which players play as Tom and aim to escape from the underworld by completing stages and collecting golden bones and power-ups. Levels feature straightforward puzzles in which players press switches or use items such as TNT to open new paths in the level. Players start with three lives. If all lives are lost, players return to the underworld and can complete a minigame to recover three lives before restarting the level. The game features nine levels across three environments, including Boot Camp, Mouseketeer Castle and the Underworld, with backgrounds rendered from the original episodes of the Tom and Jerry cartoon.

== Reception ==
Reception

Review scores
Publication	Score
4Players	57%
AllGame	3/5
Advance	58%
GamesMaster	46%

Infurnal Escape received mixed reviews upon release. Scott Anthony of Advance praised the "imaginative settings" and "big and beautiful sprites", but found the platforming "dull", the player's movement limited, and expressed annoyance at the interruption of traps. Describing the game as "unexciting" and "rubbish", GamesMaster critiqued gameplay and control issues, including enemy invincibility, input delay and difficulty in identifying traps. Describing the title as a "typical licensed game", Planet Gameboy condemned the game's "imprecise and spongy controls" and "bare essentials" of gameplay features.
