= 2 Nuts and a Richard! =

- Genre: Animated sitcom
- Created by: Brendan Hay; Steven Levitan
- Directed by: Benoit Godbout (season 1); Olivier Migneron (season 2)
- Voices of: French: Mario Tessier; José Gaudet; Richard Turcotte; Julie Beauchemin; English: Carlo Mestroni; Shawn Baichoo; Thor Bishopric
- Theme music composer: Studio 205 Inc.
- Composer: Daniel Scott
- Country of origin: Canada
- Original languages: English; French
- No. of seasons: 2
- No. of episodes: 38

Production
- Executive producer: Jacques Bilodeau
- Producers: Jacques Bilodeau; Diane Dallaire
- Running time: 21 minutes
- Production company: Oasis Animation

Original release
- Network: Télétoon la nuit (Quebec French); Adult Swim (Canadian English)
- Release: September 2, 2015 – September 19, 2017

2 Nuts and a Richard! (original French-language title: Les Grandes Gueules s'animent!) is a Canadian adult animated sitcom based on the radio show hosted by Quebecois comedy group Les Grandes Gueules. It premiered in French on Télétoon la nuit on September 2, 2015, with an English premiere on Adult Swim following on October 16, 2015.

== Development ==
Production on the series was first announced in May 2014, with the show's concept described as adapting popular sketches from the long-running Les Grandes Gueules radio show. Cast members Mario Tessier, José Gaudet and host Richard Turcotte were confirmed to return. In the English version, they're voiced by Carlo Mestroni, Shawn Baichoo and Thor Bishopric, respectively. To support the first season's launch, a game was released for browsers and mobile platforms.

A second season that consists of 12 half-hour episodes began airing on Télétoon la nuit on September 4, 2017.

== Episodes ==
=== Season 1 (2015–16) ===
No. overall	No. in season	Title	Written by	French air date	English air date
1	1	"There Are No Jobs" ("Y'en a pu de job")	Unknown	September 2, 2015	January 19, 2018
2	2	"Candy Massacre" ("Meurtres et Bonbons")	Jean-François Léger	September 2, 2015	October 30, 2015
3	3	"Survival Games" ("Jeux de survie")	Unknown	September 9, 2015	November 27, 2015
4	4	"Fluffy's Fall" ("La chute du flocon)	Unknown	September 16, 2015	October 16, 2015
5	5	"Close Encounters of the Third Chip" ("Rencontres Du Troisième Chip")	Unknown	September 23, 2015	November 13, 2015
6	6	"War of the Fences" ("Chicane de Clôture")	Unknown	September 30, 2015	November 20, 2015
7	7	"King of the Rings" ("Le Roi Des Anneaux")	Unknown	October 7, 2015	January 1, 2016
8	8	"Rick the Romantic" ("Rick le Romantique")	Daniel Gagnon & Nelson Harvey	October 14, 2015	October 23, 2015
9	9	"Claire's Baby" ("Grossesse Boutche")	Unknown	October 21, 2015	December 11, 2015
10	10	"Entity Crisis" ("Crise dit antité")	Jean-François Léger	October 28, 2015	November 6, 2015
11	11	"The Big Rose" ("La Grand' Rose")	Unknown	November 4, 2015	September 12, 2016
12	12	"Cult Movie" ("Film de culte")	Unknown	November 11, 2015	October 13, 2017
13	13	"Christmas Robbers" ("Les Criminoëls")	Jean-François Léger	December 23, 2015	December 25, 2015
14	14	"You Only Die Once" ("Mort Dans la Vie")	Unknown	January 14, 2016	December 4, 2015
15	15	"Chain Smoker" ("Show de boucane")	Unknown	January 21, 2016	October 10, 2017
16	16	"There is No Smoke Without Fire" ("Y'a pas de fumée sans feu")	Unknown	January 28, 2016	October 19, 2017
17	17	"Advertising King" ("Fils de pub")	Unknown	February 4, 2016	January 18, 2018
18	18	"Cupid's Abs" ("Les abdos de cupidon")	Unknown	February 11, 2016	January 22, 2018
19	19	"Daddy Dearest" ("Père Poule")	Unknown	September 9, 2016	October 11, 2017
20	20	"Stop Winning" ("Gros Rouge Qui Tache")	Unknown	September 16, 2016	December 18, 2015
21	21	"Pablito's Way" ("À la Manière de Pablito")	Unknown	September 23, 2016	October 9, 2017
22	22	"Spaced Out" ("Cave en Vain")	Unknown	September 30, 2016	January 23, 2018
23	23	"An Offer You Cannot Refuse" ("Une Offre Qu'On ne Peut Refuser")	Unknown	October 7, 2016	October 12, 2017
24	24	"Addictions" ("Substances Exotiques")	Unknown	October 14, 2016	October 16, 2017
25	25	"Male Nappings" ("L'Homme-lèvement")	Unknown	October 21, 2016	October 17, 2017
26	26	"The Winning Number" ("Le Numéro Gagnant")	Unknown	October 28, 2016	October 18, 2017

=== Season 2 (2017) ===
No. overall	No. in season	Title	Written by	French air date
27	1	"Jésus"	Unknown	September 4, 2017
28	2	"Pro-mutant 2000"	Unknown	September 5, 2017
29	3	"Désastre à Cherry River"	Unknown	September 6, 2017
30	4	"Chicane de Famille"	Unknown	September 7, 2017
31	5	"Amitié en Péril"	Unknown	September 8, 2017
32	6	"Hochelaga a du Talent"	Unknown	September 11, 2017
33	7	"La Guerre Des Sexes"	Unknown	September 12, 2017
34	8	"Zombie Sur Glace"	Unknown	September 13, 2017
35	9	"La Légende Du Micro D'or"	Unknown	September 14, 2017
36	10	"La Croisière Ne S'Amuse Plus"	Unknown	September 15, 2017
37	11	"Opération "Champignons Magiques""	Unknown	September 18, 2017
38	12	"Que La Fête Commence!"	Unknown	September 19, 2017

== Home video ==
The first 13 episodes were released in French on DVD in Canada by DEP Distribution on December 16, 2016.

== See also ==
- The Ricky Gervais Show
