= Ritratto di donna velata =

1975 Italian television miniseries

- Screenplay by: Gianfranco Calligarich; Paolo Levi
- Directed by: Flaminio Bollini
- Starring: Nino Castelnuovo; Daria Nicolodi
- Composer: Riz Ortolani
- Original language: Italian
- No. of episodes: 5

Production
- Cinematography: Massimo Sallusti
- Running time: 300 min.

Original release
- Network: Programma Nazionale
- Release: 31 August – 14 September 1975

Ritratto di donna velata (i.e. "Portrait of a veiled woman") is a 1975 Italian giallo-fantasy television miniseries directed by Flaminio Bollini and starring Nino Castelnuovo and Daria Nicolodi. It was broadcast on Programma Nazionale.

== Cast ==
- Nino Castelnuovo as Luigi Certaldo
- Daria Nicolodi as Elisa
- Luciano Zuccolini as Romano
- Manlio De Angelis as Sergio
- Luciana Negrini as Sandra
- Mico Cundari as Alberto Certaldo
- Nino Dal Fabbro as Mercani
- Corrado Gaipa as Nebbia
- Lisa White as Miss Lewis
- Arturo Dominici as Marston
- Massimo Serato as Grimaldi
- Paolo Bonacelli as magistrato
- Federico Scrobogna as Walter
- Dada Gallotti as Walter's Aunt
- Oliviero Dinelli as Fosco
- Gianni Pulone as Fosco's Brother
- Andrea Aureli as Bartender
- Sonia Gessner as The Sculptress
- Toni Ucci as Marston's Henchman
