= Edward (TV series) =

Canadian animated television series

Edward (French: Édouard) is a Canadian animated series produced by CinéGroupe that consists of a single season of 65 episodes, each 30 seconds in length. It first aired from January 23, 2002 to September 19, 2003 on Teletoon in Canada. It was created by Christian and Yvon Tremblay, who also made SWAT Kats: The Radical Squadron and Mega Babies.

The show spotlights the odd, humorous Edward as he ponders the meaning of life. It uses Flash animation, and is inspired by the book series Mots de tête by Quebec writer Pierre Légaré. Production of the cartoon was announced in 2001.

Some episodes are available in French on CinéGroupe's distribution YouTube channel.
