= Ellen David =

Canadian actress

- Born: Montreal, Quebec, Canada
- Occupation: Actress
- Years active: 1988–present
- Known for: The Little Lulu Show (1995-1998); Arthur (1996-2022); Caillou (1997-2000); Sagwa, the Chinese Siamese Cat (2001)

Ellen David is a Canadian actress. She was co-nominated for a 2007 Gemini Award for Best Ensemble Performance in a Comedy Program or Series in The Business episode Check Please and nominated for a 2005 Prix Gemeaux for Meilleur rôle de soutien féminin : comédie (Best supporting actress: Comedy). She also won the Award of Excellence from the Montreal chapter of the ACTRA Awards in 2015.

== Career ==
Her other animated and live-action roles include: Tripping the Rift, Arthur, The Little Lulu Show, Mambo Italiano, Law & Order, Ciao Bella, Naked Josh, For Better or For Worse, Mona the Vampire, Simon in the Land of Chalk Drawings, Postcards from Buster, Animal Crackers, Fred's Head, Are You Afraid of the Dark?, Pig City, Daft Planet, What's with Andy?, Splinter Cell, The Mystery Files of Shelby Woo, Sirens, Largo Winch, 2001: A Space Travesty, A Walk on the Moon, Random Encounter, Afterglow, Moose TV, Caillou, Princess Sissi, Ripley's Believe It or Not!, Lucky Luke, The Country Mouse and the City Mouse Adventures, Spaced Out, Billy and Buddy, Marsupilami, Wunschpunsch, Edward, Winx Club, Prudence Gumshoe, Pet Pals, Creepschool, The Kids from Room 402, Kitou, Tupu, Shaolin Kids, Fred the Caveman, Jim Button, X-DuckX, My Goldfish Is Evil!, Lola and Virginia, The Tofus, Tommy and Oscar, Nunavut, Dragon Hunters, Mica, Wombat City, Gene Fusion, Iron Nose, Kit and Kaboodle, Okura, Pinocchio 3000, Deadbolt, Barney's Version, Urban Angel, Scent of Murder, Going to Kansas City, Fatal Affair, Street Legal, Night Heat and 18 to Life.

She is a graduate of Wagar High School. Her voice can be heard on the PBS series Sagwa, the Chinese Siamese Cat as Mama Miao.

== Filmography ==
=== Film ===
Year	Title	Role	Notes
1991	The Quarrel	Freda	
1996	Rowing Through	Alexandra	
1997	Afterglow	Judy	
1997	Suspicious Minds	Lydia	
1998	Going to Kansas City	Ruth Malone	
1998	Random Encounter	Sharon	
1998	Fatal Affair	Danielle Rosenblum	
1999	A Walk on the Moon	Eleanor Gelfand	
1999	Requiem for Murder	Andrea Farquar	
2000	Isn't She Great	Sylvia	
2002	Savage Messiah (Moïse, l’affaire Roch Thériault)	Lana	
2003	Mambo Italiano	Alicia	
2004	Pact with the Devil	Diana Baker	
2005	Audition (L'Audition)	Joan	
2007	Surviving My Mother (Comment survivre à sa mère)	Clara	
2011	Goon	Mrs. Glatt	
2015	Brooklyn	Mrs. Fiorello	
2015	My Internship in Canada (Guibord s'en va-t-en guerre)	Allison	
2016	Dominion	Dorothy	
2016	Shut In	Joan	
2016	Oh What a Wonderful Feeling	Emma	
2017	Goon: Last of the Enforcers	Mrs. Glatt	
2021	Fatherhood	Dr. Jarvis	
2024	Miss Boots (Mlle Bottine)	Jennifer	
2026	Unholy Night	Carmela	

=== Television ===
Year	Title	Role	Notes
1991	The Final Heist	Marie	TV film
1991–1992	Urban Angel	Rachel Kane	Main role
1992	Deadbolt	Lani	TV film
1993	Are You Afraid of the Dark?	Ellen	"The Tale of the Full Moon"
1994–1995	Sirens	Sgt. Amy Shapiro	Main role (season 2)
1995–1998	The Little Lulu Show	Mrs. Van Snobbe (Wilbur's Mom), Miss Feeny, Additional Voices	Episodes
1996	Everything to Gain	Rosa Winters	TV film
1997	In the Presence of Mine Enemies	Gina	TV film
1997	Midnight Man	Myra	TV film
1997	The Hunger	Diana	"But at My Back I Always Hear"
1997	Princess Sissi	Ludovica (voice)	TV series, English version
1997–1998	The Mystery Files of Shelby Woo	Det. Sharon Delancey	Main role
1996–2022	Arthur	Bitzi Baxter (voice)	Recurring role
1998	Bouscotte	Judith Cohen	TV series
1999	Catherine	Bessy	"Stress et détresse"
1999	The Judy Jetson Show	Helen (Julianna and Barney's Mom)	13 Episodes
2000	Arthur's Perfect Christmas	Bitzi Baxter / Old Woman (voice)	TV film
1997–2010	Caillou	Miss Martin (voice)	Recurring role
2001	Largo Winch	Judge Susan D'Acosta	"Business as Usual"
2001-02	Sagwa, the Chinese Siamese Cat	Mama Miao (voice)	Recurring role
2002	The Stork Derby	Gina Bonaggio	TV film
2002	Scent of Danger	Connie	TV film
2002	Spaced Out	Monica Martin (voice)	Main role
2002	Pig City	Aunt Yardley (voice)	Regular role
2002	Daft Planet	Manuela (voice)	Main role
2003	Wicked Minds	Det. Clarkson	TV film
2004	Baby for Sale	Kathy Williamson	TV film
2004–2005	Ciao Bella	Sofia Battista	Main role
2005	Postcards from Buster	Bitzi Baxter (voice)	"Home Sweet Homes: Miami, Florida"
2005	Nos étés	Mrs. Donohue	"1.3"
2005	Rumeurs	Sheila Gomery	"Le retour de pendula"
2006	Last Exit	Principal Vail	TV film
2006	Naked Josh	Dr. Maitland	"Planned Parenthood", "Beating the Rap"
2006	Proof of Lies	Dr. Canton	TV film
2006–2007	The Business	Shelley Baker	Recurring role
2007	Superstorm	Barbara Scott	TV miniseries
2007	Moose TV	Ann	"Foreign Film"
2007	Killer Wave	Annabelle	TV miniseries
2008	Dr. Jekyll and Mr. Hyde	Det. Newcombe	TV film
2009	Final Verdict	Judge Mary Adler	TV film
2009	Sophie	Joyce	"Burning Bridges"
2009	The Phantom	Pam Moore	TV miniseries
2010–2011	18 to Life	Judith Bellow	Main role
2011–2014	Being Human	Ilana Myers	Recurring role
2012	O'	Catherine Auriol	"7.3"
2012	Burden of Evil	Evelyn Foster	TV film
2012	Unité 9	Juge Suzan MacDonald	"6.8"
2013	Still Life: A Three Pines Mystery	Prosecutor Brigette Cohen	TV film
2014	Mensonges	Teresa Moro	"Secrets de famille"
2014	Sex & Ethnicity	Connie	TV series
2015	The Art of More	Melanie Walters	"Mint Condition"
2015	This Life	Sybil Morrow	"The Unbelieving", "Seeing Red", "Dark Retreat"
2016	A Stranger in My Home	Kathy Carpenter	"Murder in Aspen"
2016	Level Up Norge	Maria Auditore (voice)	"Level Update #17"
2018	The Truth About the Harry Quebert Affair	Jessica Goldman	TV miniseries
2025	Ghosts	Ginny	S5, E7: The Proposal

=== Video games ===
Year	Title	Role	Notes
2014	Watch Dogs	Yolanda Mendez	
2020	The Dark Pictures Anthology: Little Hope	Angela, Anne	
