= Claudia Ferri =

Canadian actress

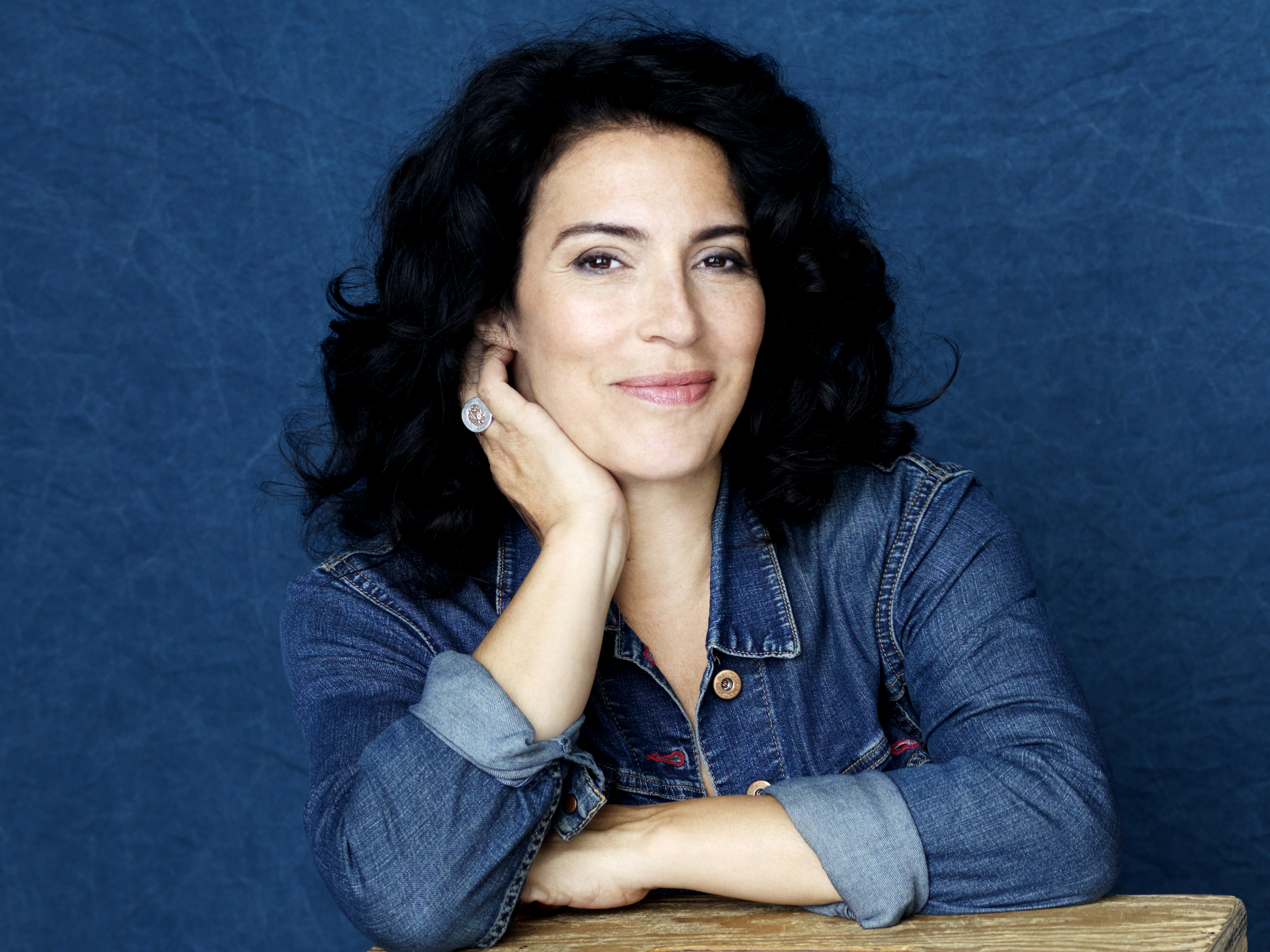
Image of Caudia Ferri

Claudia Ferri is a Canadian-American actress. Claudia has a recurring role on the first two seasons of Palm Royale, where she portrays a Cuban expat socialite Raquel Kimberly-Marco. She is most noted for her performance as Anna Barberini in the 2003 film Mambo Italiano, for which she was a Jutra Award nominee for Best Supporting Actress at the 6th Jutra Awards in 2004, and her starring role as Elena Battista in the 2004 television sitcom Ciao Bella. Claudia was named the ACTRA Montreal Woman of the Year in 2022.

== Filmography ==
=== Film ===
Year	Title	Role	Notes
1994	Sleeping with Strangers	Reporter Two	
1996	Hard Core Logo	John Oxenberger's Girlfriend	
1997	The Assignment	Maura Ramirez	
1999	Running Home	Family Officer	
2000	Artificial Lies	Audrey Wettering	
2001	Dead Awake	Lena Savage	
2003	Mambo Italiano	Anna Barberini	
2005	Hunt for Justice	Tina	
2007	Too Young to Marry	Joan	
2008	WarGames: The Dead Code	Agent Bolton	
2009	3 Seasons	Angela Pelligrini	
2009	40 Is the New 20	Jennifer	
2009	Heat Wave	Dolorès / Réceptionniste	
2010	Across the Line: The Exodus of Charlie Wright	Mary	
2015	A Date with Miss Fortune	Anna Maria	
2016	The Bronx Bull	Anita Elisabetta	
2019	Only Mine	Karen Dillon	
2019	Strange Events 2	Anna	
2019	Ice Cream in the Cupboard	Carmen	
2020	The Sticky Side of Baklava	Houwayda	
2021	Brain Freeze	Camila	
2022	Arlette	Margaret Macauly	
2022	I Will Not Starve (Non morirò di fame)	Ester	
2025	Pepe sul Cuore	Mary	

=== Television ===
Year	Title	Role	Notes
1989	MacGyver	Danielle	Episode: "Cease Fire"
1992	Highlander: The Series	Devereux's Woman	Episode: "Free Fall"
1995	Alys Robi	Madame Agostini	Episode #1.3
1997—1999	Omertà, La Loi Du Silence	Christina Panzzoni	Recurring role (series 2–3)
1999	36 Hours to Die	Gordano	TV movie
1999	Are You Afraid of the Dark?	Mrs. Evans	Episode: "The Tale of the Secret Admirer"
1999	Bonanno: A Godfather's Story	Fanny Labruzzo (Older)	TV movie
2000	The Hunger	Kate Armstrong	Episode: "The Suction Method"
2001	Snow in August	Leah	TV movie
2001	No Ordinary Baby	Nurse Donovan	TV movie
2003	Alienated	Doctor	Episode: "Hard to Keep a Good Man Down"
2004	Ciao Bella	Elena Batista	Main cast
2005	Saving Milly	Norma Alvarado	TV movie
2005	Hunt for Justice	Tina	TV movie
2005–2006	Naked Josh	Dr. Audrey Habedian	Recurring role (seasons 1-2)
2006	Nos étés	Arlette Bélanger	2 episodes
2007	Tipping Point	Dr. Horowitz	TV movie
2007	Race to Mars	Lucia Alarcon	2 episodes
2007–2009	Durham County	Roxy Calvert	Recurring role (seasons 1–2)
2008	The Christmas Choir	Rita	TV movie
2009	Ring of Deceit	Carol Kinahan	TV movie
2009	Assassin's Creed: Lineage	Maria Auditore	3 episodes
2009	The Last Templar	FBI Agent Louisa Acevedo	2 episodes
2010	Fakers	Principal Archibald	TV movie
2011	Big Time Rush	Madame Zinzibar	Episode: "Big Time Guru"
2011–2012	The Killing	Nicole Jackson	Recurring role (seasons 1–2)
2012	Longmire	Anita	Episode: "Dogs, Horses and Indians"
2013	Rogue	Sophia Hernandez	Main cast (season 1)
2013	Le gentleman	Manuella Macilla	4 episodes
2014	La marraine	La Marraine	Title role
2015	Public Morals	Helena Latour	Episode: "O'Bannon's Wake"
2015–2017	Unité 9	Bettina Selanes	Recurring role (seasons 4–6)
2016	19-2	Detective Jackie Chapelle	Episode: "Bitch"
2017	Queen of the South	La Capitana	2 episodes
2017	Bad Blood	France Charbonneau	Recurring role (season 1)
2018	The Detectives	Ruth Del Sordo	Episode: "Father's Day"
2018	Faits divers	Marietta Orsini	Recurring role (season 2)
2019	Strange Events	Anna	Episode: "Let Go"
2020	Transplant	Nina Ruiz	Episode: "Far from Home"
2021	A Christmas Proposal	Helena	TV movie
2024	Le retour d'Anna Brodeur	Maryse Deschamps	3 Episodes
2024–2026	Palm Royale	Raquel Kimberly-Marco	Recurring role
2026	Law & Order Toronto: Criminal Intent	(upcoming)	1 Episode
