= A Date with Miss Fortune =

- Film poster
- Directed by: John L'Ecuyer
- Written by: Ryan Scott; Jeannette Sousa
- Produced by: Ryan Scott; Jeannette Sousa
- Starring: Ryan Scott; Jeannette Sousa; Joaquim de Almeida; Vik Sahay; Claudia Ferri
- Cinematography: Samy Inayeh
- Edited by: Jeff Warren
- Music by: Daniel Stimac
- Production company: Picasso Chaser Productions
- Distributed by: Vision Films
- Release dates: 13 August 2015 (Portugal); 5 February 2016
- Running time: 97 minutes
- Country: Canada
- Language: English
- Box office: $152,653

A Date with Miss Fortune is a 2015 Canadian romantic comedy film, directed by John L'Ecuyer and released in Canada in 2016.

The film stars Ryan Scott and Jeannette Sousa as Jack and Maria, a man and woman entering a relationship complicated by the disapproval of Maria's Portuguese family and her fortune teller. Scott and Sousa wrote the film themselves based on their own real-life marriage.

The film also stars Joaquim de Almeida, Vik Sahay and Claudia Ferri, along with supporting character appearances by Nelly Furtado, George Stroumboulopoulos and Shawn Desman.

Daniel Stimac received a Canadian Screen Award nomination for Best Original Song ("Almost Had It All") at the 5th Canadian Screen Awards in 2017.

== Plot ==
In a diner Jack Radner, who is about to fly to London for writing inspiration after getting laid off, randomly asks to sit near Maria Monis when he sees his ex-wife Meghan. When Maria when sees it is not just a line, she plays along with Jack to help him make Meghan jealous. Once they are alone, Jack thanks Maria by buying her a pie, as they begin to get to know each other. The film then switches between the future and present, showing us how their lives unfold together.

On their first date, Maria insists on taking things slowly. She will not even let Jack kiss her, let alone come in. Back in the diner, he shows her clips of some of his exes' annoying habits so that later he can remind himself. Jack insists he does not believe in long-term commitment, nor in living together. Maria shows she is religious, unlike him.

A short time after they have been dating, Maria tearfully tells Jack that she will have to move back with her parents, so he invites her to stay awhile. Soon her things have transformed his place. When Jack quietly approaches Maria in surprise, she knocks him down in self-defense.

As Maria had thrown spilled salt over her shoulder, Jack saw her superstitious side. Once they are living together, he sees it regularly. Maria often consults Senhora Maria, who she lets Jack believe is a therapist. Actually a medium, she is convinced she must rid their home of evil spirits.

Jack is an only child, with only his dad, whereas Maria has a large, overwhelming family. On his first visit to their house, he is slightly overwhelmed. Her mother is accepting of Jack, her father not at all, her little sister plays footsie with him, as well as an array of other relatives descend upon him. Back home, he proposes.

Wilson tracks down the absentee Jack, only to find him engaged and living with Maria. He is unhappy because when he is in a relationship, his creativity dries up. Maria takes Jack to senhora Maria, and the fortune teller immediately tells her he is a bad choice.

Back at home, the couple argues as Jack is not a believer. At her family's, her father does not consider a sitcom writer to be a real job. Jack is further criticised for joking constantly, occasionally swearing, and not being knowledgeable about Portugal.

Preparing their home for Maria's family's visit, Maria is really critical of Jack's cleaning. Accidentally overlooking the bathroom trash, the visiting dog shows everyone a condom wrapper. Once everyone leaves the couple breaks up over Maria's superstitions.

Throwing himself into writing, Jack is able to turn the drama with the Portuguese family into a sitcom script. Meanwhile, Maria tells her mother she is pregnant and that senhora Maria was the reason her relationship ended. Convinced to not listen to the psychic, Maria goes to Jack's to tell him about the pregnancy, only to see two actors kissing in his window. Incorrectly believing Jack has moved on, she leaves upset.

As they are shooting the pilot, Jack reaches an epiphany. Abruptly leaving, he goes to Maria's parents' to see Maria. When he turns to senhora Maria, who will not help, he kidnaps her and goes to see Maria. They both discover the truth, and make up.

Maria goes into labor and, as they had organised a home birth with a midwife, has the baby Isabela there. However, as her midwife is unavailable, her ex-fiancé who is a Portuguese doctor helps with the delivery.

We discover that Jack did not take the job in London, as he needs to see if he and Maria have a future together. He admits that he finally believes in destiny thanks to her.

== Cast ==
- Ryan Scott as Jack
- Jeannette Sousa as Maria
- Joaquim de Almeida as Jose
- Vik Sahay as Wilson
- Claudia Ferri as Ana Maria
- Nelly Furtado as Nelia
- George Stroumboulopoulos as Paul
- Shawn Desman as Emanuel

== Release ==
The film had a limited release on February 5, 2016, in Canada, and August 13, 2016 in Portugal. It was subsequently released on TV.

== Reception ==
=== Box office ===
A Date with Miss Fortune grossed $152,653.

=== Critical response ===
The film received generally negative reviews from critics. Chris Knight of the National Post wrote that its plot "fall[s] rather flat" and "lean[s] heavily on clichés". He also wrote that "the best thing about [it] is the chemistry between the leads".
