= Oliviero Dinelli =

Italian actor

- Born: 31 March 1947 (age 79); Guardiagrele, Italy
- Occupations: Actor; voice actor
- Years active: 1970–present

Oliviero Dinelli (born 31 March 1947) is an Italian actor and voice actor.

== Biography ==
Born in Guardiagrele, Dinelli grew up in Rome, where he attended the Silvio d'Amico National Academy of Dramatic Arts and worked as a stage, radio, and television actor. In 1975 he portrayed Fosco, a grave robber, in the TV series Ritratto di donna velata.

Later, Dinelli's career transitioned into voice acting and dubbing. He performed in animated productions such as How the Toys Saved Christmas, The Spaghetti Family, Winx Club, Monster Allergy and Rat-Man. Dinelli has voiced many characters in both Italian animation and Italian-dubbed localizations.

As a voice over artist, he is known for providing Mr. Bean's Italian voice, regularly dubbing Rowan Atkinson's roles. Dinelli has expressed particular satisfaction with working to the Italian dub of Disney's animated series Darkwing Duck, where he voiced the title character.

He has also dubbed the character Remigio, portrayed by Mauro Bucci, in the English post-syncronized version of Matteo Garrone's 2019 film Pinocchio.

== Filmography ==
- La rosa bianca - TV film (1971)
- Ricorda la Pueblo - TV film (1973)
- Di fronte alla legge - TV series (1973)
- Ritratto di donna velata - TV miniseries (1975)
- Il figlio di due madri - TV miniseries (1976)
- Qui squadra mobile - TV series, season 2 (1976)
- La villa - TV miniseries (1976)
- Omobono e gli incendiari - TV play
- L'ultimo aereo per Venezia - TV miniseries (1977)
- Processo a Maria Tarnovska - TV miniseries (1977)
- Tre operai - TV film (1980)
- Casa Vianello - TV series, episode 1x12 (1988)
- Se potessi dirti addio - TV miniseries (2024)

== Voice work ==
- How the Toys Saved Christmas - Animated film (1996) - Conductor
- The Legend of the Titanic (1999), Tentacolino (2004) - Animated films - Tentacolino
- Sandokan - La tigre ruggisce ancora - Animated TV series (2001) - Ushitora
- I Magotti e la Pentola Magica - Animated short film (2001) - Cabalone
- The Spaghetti Family - Animated TV series (2003) - Poldo Spaghetti
- Winx Club - Animated series (2004-2014) - Saladin
- Monster Allergy - Animated series (2005) - Timothy-Moth
- Farhat: The Prince of the Desert (2005), Fahrat - The Black Scorpion (2009) - Animated TV series - Alì Sahied
- The Last of the Mohicans - Animated series (2006) - David Gamut
- Rat-Man - Animated series (2006), Rat-Man - Il segreto del supereroe - animated film (2007) - Arcibaldo
- Bentornato Pinocchio - Animated film (2007) - The Fox and the Cat
- Pet Pals - Animated series (2008) - Lep
- Virus Attack - Animated series (2010) - Urcla
- Spike Team - Animated series (2010-2018) - Pereira
- Gormiti Luxion: L'infinita energia della luce - Animated short film (2011) - Mystral
- Dinofroz - Animated series (2012-2015) - The Shaman
- Grisú - Animated series (2023) - Professor Smeraldo
- Degnità II: aforismi, massime, postulati di una vita - Short film (2026) - Narrator in "Lo zio Charlot" segment
