= Ciao Bella (TV series) =

Canadian television sitcom

- Created by: Steve Galluccio; Émile Gaudreault
- Starring: Claudia Ferri; Ellen David; Tony Calabretta; Jessica Heafey
- Country of origin: Canada
- No. of episodes: 13

Production
- Running time: 30 minutes

Original release
- Network: CBC Television (English); Télévision de Radio-Canada (French)
- Release: 2004 – 2005

Ciao Bella (Italian for "Hello and/or Goodbye beautiful") is a Canadian television sitcom that debuted on CBC Television in the 2004–05 television season.

Set in Montreal, Quebec, the series centres on Elena Battista (Claudia Ferri), a young, single Italian-Canadian woman whose desire for a modern lifestyle conflicts with the traditional values of her family. In the season premiere, she is hit by a bus on the way to the florist to exchange a corsage on her sister's wedding day. In the ensuing coma, she promises God that if she is allowed to live, she will take advantage of her life and live it on her own terms instead of letting her family run it for her.

Steve Galluccio, who created the series, explored similar themes in the theatrical play Mambo Italiano. Ferri appeared in the film adaptation of that play as a different character.

Each episode was filmed twice, in both English and French, with no dubbing. The French version aired on Télévision de Radio-Canada.

== Cast ==
- Claudia Ferri as Elena Batista
- Ellen David as Sophia Batista
- Tony Calabretta as Edwardo Batista
- Jessica Heafey as Carmie Batista
- Peter Miller as Elio Lanza
- Carl Alacchi as Uncle Nunzio
- Dorothée Berryman as Theresa Lanza
- Louis Philippe Dandenault as Ernie
- Johnny Falcone as Maurizio
