= 11 Somerset =

- Genre: Supernatural; Horror
- Starring: Kathleen Mackey
- Country of origin: Canada
- Original languages: French; English
- No. of seasons: 1
- No. of episodes: 13

Production
- Production company: CinéGroupe

Original release
- Network: Télé-Québec; A-Channel
- Release: 2004

11 Somerset is a Canadian children's television series that airs in French on Télé-Québec and in English on A-Channel.

It focuses on Laurie Lamera (Jessica Malka) and Oliver Marsan (Jamieson Boulanger), two teenagers who investigate paranormal phenomena. It also stars Kathleen Mackey as Laurie's sidekick Lucy Mercer.

The show has been adapted into a point-and-click computer adventure game (linked to from www.gamershood.com) containing 13 adventures where players must find and use tools, clues, and technology to solve increasingly difficult puzzles.

== Cast ==
- Jamieson Boulanger as Oliver Marsan (13 episodes, 2004-2005)
- Lorne Brass as John Marsan (10 episodes, 2004-2005)
- Marie Turgeon as Helen Lamera (8 episodes, 2004-2005)
- Jessica Malka as Laurence Lamera
- Daniel Rousse as Lenny Moss
- Joseph Antaki as Mario Benedetti
- Shawn Baichoo as Luc Blackburn
- Orphée Ladouceur as Thanh Bein Nguyen
- Christian Paul as Anthony Murat
- Kathleen Mackey as Lucie Mercier
- Judith Baribeau as Magali Lemay

== Episode list ==
Note: Episode synopsizes translated from French source using google translate.

No.	Title
1	"The ghost in the mirror I"
"One night, in the bedroom mirror, Laurence emerging ghost of his father. She then tries to contact a specialist in paranormal phenomena but rather is the knowledge of the latter's son, Olivier. Nocturnal apparitions multiply and shady individuals begin to watch his comings and goings. Olivier will he help Laurence decode the ghost of messages and escape his pursuers?"
2	"The ghost in the mirror II"
"Paul Lamera worked before his death, on a revolutionary technology prototype that arouses desires. Helen and John Lamera Marsan help police investigate the circumstances of the violent death of Paul. Meanwhile, Laurence receives new messages from his father, this time electronically. That suddenly Laurence is kidnapped! Olivier shortly after receiving a call at least strange. It took him only pull Laurence clutches of his captors ..."
3	"Burn"
"Olivier is on holiday in the country with his uncle. He sees Luke, his childhood friend and meets a lonely man who predicted terrible disasters. That night, Luke's mother dies, burned in a lightning flash. When other incomprehensible disaster erupt, terror seizes all the villagers like wildfire. What is the role of the old man in this story and what dark secret the little village he tries to forget for so many years?"
4	"Evil"
"One morning at school, Laurence discovers her friend Lucy, lying on the ground suffering from uncontrolled agitations. The students and some teachers suspect Mark Antony, young albino boy, to be possessed by the devil. Those who have been in contact with him were taken shortly after convulsions and lost consciousness. Overcoming fears, Laurence defends Mark Antony. In seeking the truth at all costs, it may perhaps be the next victim ..."
5	"The nocturnal visitors"
"Since Anthony has accepted a new job as a night watchman at the university, it is not the same. Under questioning by Olivier, he finally confesses that dark apparitions haunt the corridors. He learned soon after his predecessor attended the same phenomena and that he left his post before losing reason. To protect against evil spirits, Haitian grandmother Anthony gave him a talisman. Olivier decided instead to escort his great friend at the next round ..."
6	"The threat from the sky"
"Laurence, Lucie and Thanh want to get together with girls and decided to camp in the forest. But the weekend starts badly: an object fell from the sky, crashed near their tent in a deafening roar. They are determined to enjoy their getaway all costs and rise the camp. At dusk, Lucie and Thanh suffer from severe discomfort while a blue silhouette glide between trees. Only Laurence has to take care of her friends and face the dangers that lurk ..."
7	"Orange Hell"
"Laurence accompanies Helen Abitibi where Martine Lacombe, esoteric painter, made his paintings, drawing sets copper mines abandoned. Helen and Laurence leave with Martine visit the mines. Or an earthquake occurs, causing landslides. Here captive in an underground room where bubbling lake with orange highlights. As they scan the walls to find a way out, the orange substance that seems endowed with life slowly approaches them ..."
8	"The spectrum of the marsh"
"Laurence Olivier and Lucie spend the weekend in a camp of observation to monitor the passage of a satellite built by the father of Laurence. Looking towards the stars, Laurence quickly falls to earth when worrying spectra arise near them. An invisible attack livestock and game and some animals, head or legs least roam the forest. Is there a link between these events and the cabin in the woods where Laurence saw hideous faces pressed to the windows?"
9	"Echoes"
"An inexplicable failure of the computer system suddenly paralyzes the Museum of Civilization and locks Olivier and visitors in a showroom. Voices from the grave resound between the walls and the Companions of Oliver felt a growing anxiety ... An Aboriginal youth is convinced that it is the voice of his ancestors who express their anger. Disturbing echoes were quick to warm the spirits when the first shot rang!"
10	"Stronger than death"
"Laurence Héliatech back to the laboratory of his father, meet Dr. Vidal, a former colleague of Paul Lamera. The enigmatic philosopher researcher immortality and discreetly puts an unknown object to Laurence. Georges Vidal died overnight. But a few hours later in the morgue, his body revives and ran down the track of his old acquaintances. Laurence has much to do to escape it, unless it is not the only one on his trail ..."
11	"The kiss of the Gorgon"
"A village girl drowned in mysterious circumstances. A few hours later, Olivier, who trains in the same lake, suffered a leg burn. The next day, the burn Olivier spread and triggers high fever. We discover the same day on the beach, dozens of stranded fish. Some voices to incriminate the legendary lake monster. Laurence wants to solve the mystery and fight the evil that gnaws Olivier but she has little time ..."
12	"Foreign"
"A young boy hit by a car, is collected at the Manoir du Val. Upon waking, the child has no memory of his identity. However, it seems to remember certain events that took place in these enclosed spaces, long before his birth. Dominique Champlain, owner of the manor, is convinced of being in the presence of the spirit of his nephew, who died 15 years ago. It uses John to solve the mystery. Laurence, who accompanied her little investigation begins ..."
13	"Ciel blood"
"An ancient statue unearthed at an archeological dig site in the boreal forest. John, called to the scene to authenticate the artifact comes with Olivier. The nature around them suddenly breaks loose: glowing sky, cut communications, electrical appliances down. What could be the cause of these disturbing dysfunction? Especially as suspicious faces, known John and his family, lurking around the site. Someone seems ready to remove all traces of the excavations ..."
