= Miss Pepperpot =

Breed of chicken

The Miss Pepperpot is a crossbred variety chicken. It is the result of breeding a Rhode Island Red with a Marans and a Plymouth Rock chicken.
