= Charley and Mimmo =

Belgian-Canadian-French traditionally animated children's television series

- Genre: Children's television series Preschool
- Music by: Peter Measroch
- Opening theme: "Charley and Mimmo" performed by Sonja Ball
- Ending theme: "Charley and Mimmo" (instrumental)
- Countries of origin: Belgium; Canada; France
- Original languages: English; French
- No. of episodes: 65

Production
- Running time: 4–5 minutes

Original release
- Network: YTV; Treehouse TV
- Release: 1999 – 2002

Charley and Mimmo (French: T'choupi et Doudou) is a traditionally animated children's television series broadcast on YTV between 1999 and 2002. 65 episodes were produced. The series is based on the T'choupi children's books by French author-illustrator Thierry Courtin, published by Nathan, and was produced by the French studio Les Armateurs.

== Premise ==
Charley and Mimmo (/ˈmiːmoʊ/) consists of a typical family (father, mother, son, and baby sister) in a suburban town. The son, Charley and his (almost anthropomorphic) teddy bear Mimmo, are the main characters. Charley and his family and friends are penguin/seal-like creatures (with round orange clown-like noses instead of beaks, and they live in a warm area rather than Antarctica. They have penguin-like feet and coloring, but have mitten-like "hands" rather than wings or flippers). Charley and most of the characters are a standard black and white, typical of real penguins, although some of the other characters are brown.

"T'choupi" is Charley's name in French and "Doudou" is Mimmo's name in French.

== Production ==
Charley and Mimmo seems somewhat related to another Canadian children's production Caillou, as it has a similar artstyle and plot (except Caillou has longer stories and live puppet segments in the PBS Kids airings).

The character T'choupi was created by Thierry Courtin in 1992 for educational games published by Jeux Nathan. In 1998 the studio Les Armateurs decided to adapt the character for television. The adaptation was written and directed by Marie Locatelli, Jean-Luc François and Didier Lejeune, and Les Armateurs is the company of producer Didier Brunner, who also produced Kirikou and the Sorceress and The Triplets of Belleville. The series was a co-production credited to Les Armateurs, Cymax, Canal J, Nathan, Tooncan and VIP Toons and it consists of 65 episodes of five minutes each which first broadcast on Canal J in 1999. In 2001 Les Armateurs also started developing a feature film starring the character which was released in 2004.

=== Music ===
The original music score for the series is the work of composer Peter Measroch.

== Broadcast ==
Charley and Mimmo was broadcast on YTV from 1999 to 2002 and on Treehouse TV. On YTV, two to three 10–15 minute segments form an airing of the series.

=== United States ===
In the US, it aired on It's Itsy Bitsy Time, among many foreign short segments when it was broadcast on Fox Family from 1999 to 2001.

== Film ==
A 2004 film entitled "T'choupi" was released by Gebeka Films, but only in France, South Korea and Poland. The plot follows Charley and his friends working together to find out who has stolen all the toys.

== Characters ==
- Charley (voiced by Samuel Holden): The star of the show. He is a typical, average child. His voice and appearance suggest that he is somewhere between four and seven years old, although he is smart for his age. Charley is occasionally bossy and frequently starts arguments among his friends. He also tends to get upset, angry and jealous quickly, and then regrets it later. Sometimes, Charley lies and has a slightly disapproving character.
- Lola (voiced by Sonja Ball) & Ted (voiced by Rick Jones): Charley and Franny's parents.
- Franny (voiced by Sonja Ball): Charley's baby sister. She mostly speaks gibberish.
- Lily (voiced by Sonja Ball): A girl who is Charley's friend. She has curly black pigtails. At the beach, she wears* a yellow swimsuit. She has a female teddy bear who Charley won for her at a carnival, and with which Mimmo is falling in love.
- Grandpa (voiced by Walter Massey) & Grandma (voiced by Thelma Farmer): Charley's grandparents.
- Pauli (voiced by Alfee Kaufman): One of Charley's friends. He has reddish-brown and white fur, curly hair, and freckles.
- Paula (voiced by Susan Glover): Another friend of Charley. She has brown fur and blonde hair with bangs.
