= The Secret World of Santa Claus =

French Canadian 1997 animated TV show

- Directed by: Christian Choquet; Prakash Topsy
- Voices of: Tony Robinow; Teddy Lee Dillon; Thor Bishopric; Anik Matern; Michael Rudder; Mark Camacho; Ian Finlay; Gary Jewell; A.J. Henderson; Bruce Dinsmore
- Theme music composer: Marie-Florence Gros; Philippe Brétonniere
- Composers: Olivier Aussudre; Jean-Louis Bompoint
- Countries of origin: France; Canada
- Original languages: French; English
- No. of episodes: 26

Production
- Executive producers: Olivier Bremond; Pascal Breton
- Editor: Brigitte Breault
- Running time: 22 minutes
- Production companies: Marathon Productions; CinéGroupe

Original release
- Network: France 3 (France); Télé-Québec (Canada)
- Release: December 1 – December 26, 1997

The Secret World of Santa Claus (French title Le Monde secret du Père Noël, German title Weihnachtsmann & Co. KG) is a Canadian French children's animated television show. It is syndicated to several countries worldwide, including Teletoon in Canada, and Super RTL in Germany, and is generally seen every December during the holiday season. On December 25, 1999, Christmas Day, The Secret World of Santa Claus marathon took place from 6:00am to 7:00pm. As of 2013, it has been released on 2 DVDs from Cinedigm in the US.

== Synopsis ==
Each episode usually starts out showing Santa Claus preparing for Christmas and doing some Christmas-related activities at his workshop. Then two recurring villains (Gruzzlebeard and his partner Dudley) show up trying to foil Santa's plan and ruin the hopes of children. The two trolls usually end up actually finding themselves in a trap that they constructed themselves and the show usually ends showing that all of Santa's things end up turning out fine.

== Characters ==
=== Santa Claus ===
Santa Claus is the main protagonist of the show. He owns a large workshop in the North Pole with his three elves. He owns a sleigh with reindeer. It is not clear how long he has been Santa Claus or how old he is but in the episode "The 12 Labours of Santa Claus" it is revealed that he has been Santa Claus for at least 100 years. Also in "The Christmas Conference" he stated that they had successfully ended the 451st annual Christmas Conference, so he has apparently been in the job for a long time. He is always shown in the classic Santa outfit: a red suit, hat, pants and black boots with golden buckles. He is voiced by Tony Robinow.

=== Thoren ===
Thoren is the only female elf at the workshop and she is often very caring and kind. Like the other elves, she always wants things to turn out best for Santa Claus and is the one who looks out for everyone's safety. Her powers enable her to fly, become invisible for short periods of time and she is able to translate any known language on the planet, including animals. Because she cannot hold her powers for long amounts of time, it is believed that she is the second oldest elf, next to Jordi. She is voiced by Anik Matern.

=== Guilfi ===
Guilfi is the tallest elf at the workshop and is great with mechanics. He wears a red hat and constantly has his sleeves rolled up. He has not graduated to the level of Master elf like Thoren or Jordi, hence why he is usually left at the workshop and has no powers (until the last episode where he develops telekinesis). Santa Claus takes Guilfi with him sometimes when Jordi can't go, or goes on a mission with Jordi and Thoren. He's maybe the youngest elf, but also learned the Russian language after to go to Kalicagrad with Jordi, Balbo, Thoren and Santa Claus. He is voiced by Teddy Lee Dillon.

=== Jordi ===
Presumably the oldest elf due to his refined magical skills, he is the brains of the three and primarily involved with tech and maintenance. He has a strong sense of responsibility and is usually no-nonsense, particularly when it comes to Guilfi, but he has also been shown to goof off and have fun on occasion. He is always willing to help people but usually jumps in without thinking. He is the shortest, wears a red hat with a pompom and his undershirt is untucked. He has the power to change into any animal or inanimate object for any period of time. He is also quite a magnet with girls, being referred to as 'cute' as well as having a brief fling with a nymph. He is voiced by Thor Bishopric.

=== Balbo ===
Balbo is a polar bear that acts as Santa's assistant. In one episode it is revealed that Santa found him when he got lost at sea on an iceberg and separated from his parents. Santa found him and took him to his workshop. Balbo is very playful and also horribly clumsy. He usually watches the workshop with Guilfi. He's in love with Thoren. He is voiced by A.J. Henderson.

=== Gruzzlebeard ===
Gruzzlebeard (originally called Père Fouettard in French) is the main antagonist and Santa's neighbour in the series and often tries to foil his plans and ruin Christmas. He appears in almost every episode trying to foil Santa's plan, but in the end, he often ends up stuck in his own trap. He is a large Troll, almost human in appearance with a large blue "gruzzled" beard (hence his name) and a bald, cone-shaped head. He enjoys bossing Dudley around and playing the guitar (which he isn't very good at). He usually refers to Santa as 'That Red-suited Sap' or 'Bulbnose', the elves as 'The Oafs' and the reindeer as 'The Hatracks'. Gruzzlebeard and Dudley both seem to be immortal and ageless: both have not aged when Santa travels into the year 2222, where Gruzzlebeard has become a futuristic totalitarian dictator in absence of Santa and his helpers. He is voiced by Mark Camacho.

=== Dudley ===
Dudley is a different species of Troll from Gruzzlebeard (Dudley is a Terrible Troll, which is a close cousin of elves). This was confirmed in "The Story of the Trolls" where in order to find out how to defeat a Terrible Troll, Santa & the Elves had to ask a Terrible Troll themselves, in which they removed Dudley's hat while he was asleep and found out that the globe attached to his head was made of steel. Up to that episode, however, there was never anything under his hat and Gruzzlebeard had even called him an elf on numerous occasions (and his ears are more like an elves' than a troll's). Dudley can be just as sneaky and evil as Gruzzlebeard, but he does have a good side. He has often helped Santa (probably just to save his own butt) and is often fed up with the way Gruzzlebeard treats him. Like Gruzzlebeard, he is both immortal and ageless. He is voiced by Michael Rudder.

=== The Reindeer ===
Instead of the traditional team of Santa Claus's reindeer, there are only three reindeer that pull Santa's sleigh: Rudolph (voiced by Bruce Dinsmore; Jacob Tierney in episodes 1 and 20), his father Donner (voiced by Ian Finlay) and his grandfather Blitzen (voiced by Gary Jewell). The other two don't have very big roles, but Rudolph got his own episode in the show, entitled "Rudolph is Missing", where he thought no one wanted him around. He ran away and befriended a young Inuk boy, though they eventually parted ways when Santa came looking for him.

== Episodes ==
No.	Title	Directed by	Written by	Original release date	Prod. code
1	"The Magic Pearl"	Christian Choquet and Prakash Topsy	Christopher Assefi	December 1, 1997	101
When Gruzzlebeard steals the toy machine in an attempt to stop toy production and it accidentally gets smashed. Though it is salvageable, the pearl that powers it, breaks on exposure to sunlight. Santa, Balbo, Guilfi and Thoren head to the cave where they first found the pearl to find another, but they are opposed by a giant Abominable Snowman and a monster bat. With luck and cunning, they are able to find the pearl and get it back to a repaired toy machine.
2	"The 12 Labours of Santa Claus"	Jean-Louis Bompoint and Christian Choquet	Olivier Marvaud	December 2, 1997	102
Santa reveals to the elves he got a letter in the mail stating that he is being given the 12 tests that he takes every 100 years in order to be allowed to stay Santa. When the judges get lost, Gruzzlebeard shows them where Santa is, and is sure that he and Dudley will make Santa lose. He passes the first test, and for the second test, Gruzzlebeard explains to Dudley how he will cheat to make Santa lose. The elves hear this, and decide that they must keep an eye on Gruzzlebeard. Gruzzlebeard and Dudley try cheating many times, but the elves always make sure Santa passes the task. On the 12th task, the elves once again save Santa from being cheated by Gruzzlebeard. However, Santa finds some children watching him, and over one child, an icicle is about to fall. Santa leaves the test to go and save the child from the icicle. Although he did not get back in time, he is still Santa for another 100 years because of his bravery.
3	"Little Geniuses"	Jean-Louis Bompoint and Christian Choquet	Stéphane Cabel and Olivier Nicolas	December 3, 1997	103
The database says that there are only twin brothers in a place called Sugartown. Santa takes Thoren and Guilfi to that place, posing as a family. The elves learn from the other children that the twins are troublemaking geniuses because of their computer expert parents. The elves figured that the twins hacked the gift database and Thoren sneaks into their house only to be caught. Guilfi manages to help her "escape", only for the boys to follow them and stow away on Santa's sleigh. They figure to hack the main computer so that Santa will give them all the presents. When Balbo finds them in the candy bag he brought into the storehouse, he runs off scared and informs Santa, who decides to teach the boys a lesson. They trick them over to Gruzzlebeard's house, where he catches them and make them his personal house cleaners. When he hears about Santa's website, he is eager to access it only for Santa and the elves to arrive on time to relieve them of service. After the boys see Santa's toy store, he reminds them that they are only for good girls and boys which the twins feel guilty over their actions, as Jordi didn't succeed to repair the machine. The twins then help solve the problem which after Jordi says he will eat up his hat if they succeed which they did and Thoren teases Jordi as everyone laughs and the boys get home. After that, they send a big supply of candy maybe with the help of the other children of Sugartown.
4	"Rudolph Is Missing"	Jean-Louis Bompoint and Christian Choquet	Sandro Agénor	December 4, 1997	104
It is a practice run for Santa's sleigh ride. Afterwards, the reindeer get a little break. Rudolph disobeys Santa's orders and goes skating. When he falls through the ice, he gets a cold and cannot carry the sleigh anymore. At night, Rudolph is upset because he thinks Santa won't need him anymore. Gruzzlebeard, meanwhile, got a letter to Santa sent to him accidentally asking for Rudolph. Gruzzlebeard tells Rudolph to deliver the present himself and prove to Santa how great he is. Rudolph runs away to deliver himself, and Santa and the elves are worried about him. They go after him and get Rudolph back. They then punish Gruzzlebeard. In the end, Santa gets the child a baby reindeer whose parents were caught by the wolves.
5	"The Starchild"	Jean-Louis Bompoint and Christian Choquet	Olivier Marvaud	December 5, 1997	105
Santa gets a message from a boy named Simon who wants a pony and he's in Outer Space. Santa, Jordi and Thoren decide to go to Space to give him a pony while Balbo and the other elf stay at home. Gruzzlebeard tries wrecking the sleigh, but the pony kicks Gruzzlebeard into it. Santa and the two elves go to space after shrinking the pony so they can take him, but Gruzzlebeard is also in space with them. Santa shrinks Gruzzlebeard as well and delivers the pony, but a meteorite is coming straight for the space station which Simon is on. The sleigh pulls the space station out of the way from the meteorite, making a merry Christmas for Simon and his family. The note left says that the horse will return to normal size upon return to Earth.
6	"Leon's Christmas"	Jean-Louis Bompoint and Christian Choquet	Stéphane Cabel and J. Gasiorowski	December 6, 1997	106
Santa is getting less and less Christmas letters. It turns out that a boy named Leon is persuading people to stop believing in Santa Claus. Santa and the elves discover that Leon's letter got lost years ago, wanting his dog Lenny back who was given away to a lady who wanted to dye him pink, as she did for all her dogs, but he ran away. Since Santa didn't give him his dog back, Leon started doing this, going as far as ripping his brother Humphrey's letter. Santa and company get Lenny back and Leon finally learns that Santa is real.
7	"A Present for Two"	Jean-Louis Bompoint and Christian Choquet	Sandro Agénor	December 7, 1997	107
Santa did not get a letter from one kid yet, Alex. He is the richest boy in the world, but his father doesn't let him play with other children, but hires adults to play with him. He is also home schooled, so he has no friends. Santa takes him to the workshop to choose a toy but Alex's father bought every single one. After a mishap in which Alex get lost with the reindeer, he finally decides what he wants – to be Santa. Santa lets him give a present to one person, and he chooses his crush, Kathy, so he can get closer with her. Kathy asked Santa for a bike for Christmas, so she gets a bike with two seats, one for Kathy and one for Alex. Alex is finally happy.
8	"Super Rabbit"	Jean-Louis Bompoint and Christian Choquet	Story by : Annabelle Perrichon; Teleplay by : Olivier Nicolas	December 8, 1997	108
A boy named Randy has a rabbit doll named Jumper, but his older brother Frank throws it away, saying that it is for babies. Santa and the elves get the toy back, but Frank doesn't let Randy take it back through any means. Santa decides to make a video game, the brother's favourite thing, called "Super Rabbit", and it comes with a free Super Rabbit doll. Since the brother is interested in it, he lets him have the doll. It turns out that the older brother is very into the doll as well.
9	"The Lucky Charm"	Jean-Louis Bompoint and Christian Choquet	Story by : Michael Goffard; Teleplay by : Sandro Agénor	December 9, 1997	109
A figure skater girl named Crystal has lost her lucky charm, so she is no longer skating well. Santa and the elves must look for that lucky charm. Gruzzlebeard, meanwhile, puts Dudley in the world skating competition but cheats so Dudley will win. Jordy steals the remote and fixes it so if Gruzzlebeard cheats, Dudley will sure be in for a surprise. Santa gives Crystal a fake lucky charm and she skates great; she is the winner along with her best friend, Natasha. Thoren and Balbo also enter and win a prize. Dudley, however, does not skate great due to being sick. When Santa reveals to Crystal that the lucky charm was fake, she learns to believe in herself. He then gives her a pair of crystal skates for Christmas.
10	"The Flying Carpet"	Jean-Louis Bompoint and Christian Choquet	Stéphane Cabel and J. Gasiorowski	December 10, 1997	110
A boy's father won't come home for Christmas because he is an archaeologist. Something from his site has been stolen and he cannot leave until it is found. Meanwhile, Santa has gone to Almeria and Gruzzlebeard has mixed up the telephone chords so when the elves call Santa, they'd really be calling Gruzzlebeard. They call asking to go to Almeria to get a magic carpet, and their answer is yes, but they get captured by people, who actually stole the missing item from the site, who ransom for the elves. Gruzzlebeard helps out Santa in order for him to forgive him. Then, the boy's father is brought back to his son on the magic carpet for Christmas.
11	"Santa Claus' Memoirs"	Jean-Louis Bompoint and Christian Choquet	Sophie Decroisette and J.R. Francois	December 11, 1997	111
When a famed reporter comes to the North Pole to interview Santa on his greatest adventure, he tells her about his time about a thousand years ago. When his tower receives a letter from a boy named Arthur, asking for Excalibur, Santa and Guilfi head off for England. After being mistaken for a jouster named the White Baron and defeated Gruzzlebeard, who was a Viscount, he learns that Excalibur is a sword that is held by Merlin. In the enchanted forest, the two met the famed wizard only to learn that he doesn't have the sword; the Lady of the Lake has it. They managed to get the sword after solving a riddle about the wind, but Guilfi accidentally mentions Merlin, which he told them never to say his name in front of her. Santa was able to talk to the two of them, convincing each other that they made the sword in the first place. Just as they were about to deliver Arthur's present to him, Gruzzlebeard attempts to steals it, forcing Merlin to put in a stone. He then decrees that on Christmas Eve, the one who pulls it out of the stone shall become king of England. After numerous knights (comically Gruzzlebeard) tried, Arthur was able to pull it out. With his tale concluded, the reporter asks for the group's picture, which might reveal too much. Luckily, Santa had magically erased their photo.
12	"Magic Wand"	Jean-Louis Bompoint and Christian Choquet	Stéphane Cabel and J. Gasiorowski	December 12, 1997	112
Morgan is always made fun of because of her long nose, so she wishes for a magic wand to make it shorter. Gruzzlebeard makes a fake magic wand out of the wrong wood under the full moon and gives it to her, pretending it's from Santa. Morgan cannot control this wand and people all over the city begin turning into animals. Santa and the elves come to save the day, and she learns to live with the way she looks. Gruzzlebeard is then punished when they give him a defective wand.
13	"The Boy Who Wished to be Little Again"	Jean-Louis Bompoint and Christian Choquet	Stéphane Cabel and J. Gasiorowski	December 13, 1997	113
Dudley is tired of being teased by Gruzzlebeard because he is small. Another boy named David wants to get smaller for Christmas because his baby sister gets all the attention. Dudley steals a machine from Santa and secretly makes himself huge and David smaller than a spider. David learns his lesson, and Santa becomes small and Thoren becomes huge so Santa can save David. Once David is rescued, after learning that his family does care for him, everyone is restored to normal size. Santa then give the boy sister a carrousel which was what her older brother wished for her.
14	"A Present for Santa"	Jean-Louis Bompoint and Christian Choquet	Story by : Michael Goffard; Teleplay by : Sandro Agénor	December 14, 1997	114
The elves are called to the village nearby by its children, who want to ask for what Santa wants as a present. First, as the children's hangout, they try everyone's ideas but nothing seemed to fit. Meanwhile, Gruzzlebeard unleashes two termites upon Santa's home, intending for them to eat it down to the ground. Jordi catches them after they eaten a special suit that Santa wears every once in a while for a Christmas Convention. Santa however is distressed, for his good suit had special powers and without it, he'd look like a fool. The elves and Balbo head off to the forest of the Trolls to get the materials to make a new one, as well as to gather fireflies for the runway's lighting. They got the materials but since they had nothing to pay for them, they had to trade Balbo's fur. After a lot of difficulty putting the suit together, they present it to Santa at the children's hangout. Next morning, the elves find a big present outside. Apparently, the children had also planned their present while they were away. They open it and it turned into a hot air balloon. As they float abort, the elves return the termites to Gruzzlebeard's house, eating it down to the ground.
15	"The Christmas Conference"	Christian Choquet and Prakash Topsy	Story by : Gilles Cahoreau; Teleplay by : Sandro Agénor	December 15, 1997	115
Every hundred years, Santa invites his magical friends to the North Pole. He then transforms the area near his workshop into a sunny paradise, but then gets a letter from a boy who wishes to fly because the city he lives in can only be reached by helicopter. He sends Thoren and Guilfi to get his friends, Frosty Freddie, who controls snow and ice, Helpy Helga, who has the power of rain and Stardust Glitter, who controls fire. Santa also expects Bafauna, an old lady who rides on a broomstick and controls the wind but she gets sidetracked over misinformed instructions and gets caught by Gruzzlebeard, who poses as her to sneak over to the Christmas Conference. Santa decides on a contest to see who can create the best present for flying. When his friends are finished their inventions, Gruzzlebeard sabotages them when they go to sleep. Next day, they try out the inventions on the elves who perform greatly, but they feel apart. They are saved by each magical beings' powers. Afterward, they accuse each other of sabotage until the elves unmask Gruzzlebeard. Everyone goes to Gruzzlebeard's house to free Bafauna. Frosty Freddie then uses his ice powers to trap Gruzzlebeard and Dudley within their own home. Santa then figures out they been going out at this all wrong; instead of competing against each other, they should be working together. His friends then work to create a flight suit that is resistant to all the elements and equipped with a GPS so that the boy can find his way home. As Santa brings his friends back to their respective homes, Gruzzlebeard and Dudley dig out of their frozen house and try to get warm at the melted lake, not knowing that Guilfi and Balbo are shutting down the heater that melted the lake. The duo soon find out too late.
16	"The Story of the Trolls"	Christian Choquet and Prakash Topsy	Sandro Agénor	December 16, 1997	116
Two young Scottish boy and girl had requested for information about elves. Santa then proceeds to tells the elves about their origins. Elves were raised in a magical land where they had fierce competition with their cousins, the Terrible Trolls. They then make a book then makes it look like the characters are moving, but Gruzzlebeard catches on and has Dudley construct an antimatter beam straight to the workshop transceiver. As the book is finished, the Trolls came out of the book, causing mass chaos in the workshop. Everyone was able to get out and lock the trolls inside. In order to know how to stop the Trolls before they destroy all of the toys, Santa, Thoren and Jordi search for the elves. The only thing they could get from an elf elder is that the secret lies with only the trolls. They sneak into Gruzzlebeard's house, finding the beam which Jordi tinkers with. Santa finds under Dudley's hat the globe that is traditional for trolls, it is made of steel. Next day, the sleigh is equipped with a magnet powered by a solar panel. Thoren and Guilfi proceed to have the remaining toys chase the trolls out, but the skies are cloudy, so there is no power for the magnet. Rudolph has an idea and takes them above the cloudline, giving the magnet enough juice to bring the trolls together and have their balls smashed. They are then returned to the book. As they fix the book, Jordi reveals that he tweaked the antimatter beam to act as a giant magnet, attracting all metal objects within Gruzzlebeard's house.
17	"Dudley's Christmas"	Christian Choquet and Prakash Topsy	J.M. Rudnicki and Stéphane Cabel	December 17, 1997	117
Dudley is fed up with doing all of Gruzzlebeard's chores, so he wants a robot for Christmas to do all his chores. The elves feel bad for Dudley and make him one even though they didn't ask Santa yet. The robot however is crazy and starts siphoning all of the North Pole's electricity. Everybody works together to stop the robot, but it isn't easy. They eventually capture him, and they make the robot peddle to generate enough electricity. Santa then gives Dudley a robot to keep Gruzzlebeard preoccupied while he relaxs.
18	"The Return of Santa Claus"	Christian Choquet and Prakash Topsy	Christophe Poujol, A. Monrigal and Stéphane Cabel	December 18, 1997	118
Jordy creates a teleportation device. Santa and the three elves go into it, but Gruzzlebeard cuts a wire, sending them to the year 2222. There, Santa is unknown and Gruzzlebeard is a monument. The only person who remembers Santa is a boy named Hubert, who has a picture that Santa gave one of his ancestors. Santa and the elves, along with Hubert, stop the future Gruzzlebeard and save the future. They then come back to the present and stop Gruzzlebeard before he cuts the wire. The future is then changed and Santa awards an unknowing Hubert a toy Santa. This episode confirms that both Gruzzlebeard and Dudley are ageless immortals (most likely through the fact that they are Trolls).
19	"The Tall Little Girl"	Christian Choquet and Prakash Topsy	Stéphane Cabel and A. Rees	December 19, 1997	119
Balbo's birthday is coming up, and Santa is making a surprise party for him, although he has a lot on his sleeve. A girl named Kinshey wants to be taller because her coach won't let her play in basketball games. Disobeying Santa, Jordy gives Kinshey a potion that would make her taller, but it makes her giant. She begins wrecking the city, but eventually Santa comes to the rescue and makes her normal sized once again. She then appreciates her real size. Afterwards is Balbo's party. They then go to the basketball game in which Kinshey is allowed to play. Santa then gives her a pair of spring-heeled shoes.
20	"The Teddy Bear"	Christian Choquet and Prakash Topsy	Stéphane Cabel and J. Gasiorowski	December 20, 1997	120
A boy wants a teddy bear the size of a real bear for Christmas. The elves are being mean to Balbo, meanwhile, so Balbo decides to run away and give himself to the boy. Gruzzlebeard goes after Balbo because he wants to hypnotize Balbo into telling him all about Santa. The boy becomes attached to Balbo, but Gruzzlebeard takes him away. Soon, Gruzzlebeard, Balbo and the boy all find themselves in the middle of a lake, risking their lives, and Santa eventually comes to save the day. He then gives the boy a plush of Balbo then can grow to life-size.
21	"Stolen Christmas"	Christian Choquet and Prakash Topsy	Christopher Assefi	December 21, 1997	121
A boy named Jesse didn't get a present on Christmas when he was little, so he doesn't think anybody else should. He dresses up as Santa Claus to fool the mail-carriers to bring all the letters to his mansion and robs stores so others cannot get the toys. The real Santa is soon arrested, while the imposter goes home with the elves. The imposter asks the toy machine to make him pills, so he becomes a huge monster. Meanwhile, Santa escapes from prison and uses a toy plane to fly to the North Pole. But he runs out of gas. Luckily for him, a young boy trades his fish for gas. He arrives just in time to save his elves from Jesse. He lures the behemoth to the frozen lake, where he falls in, in which the side effects of his pills give him a different color. He asks for help from Santa, who uses magic to return him to normal and Jesse reveals that he didn't get a present because he never wrote to Santa. Santa then brings Jesse to the police and returns all the toys. He also gives the generous boy a new fishing rod and a pond full of fish.
22	"Havoc in Toyland"	Christian Choquet and Prakash Topsy	Story by : Sandro Agénor and J.M. Rudnicki; Teleplay by : Christopher Assefi	December 22, 1997	122
Gruzzlebeard casts a spell on all the toys, making them come to life. Santa and the elves must return them to normal, but Gruzzlebeard traps Santa in a lot of bubble gum. Santa eventually escapes and helps the elves return the toys to normal. One toy decides to rebel against Santa, but the other toys stand up to him and tell Santa. The bad toy asks Gruzzlebeard for a potion to turn all toys at the toy store alive, but Santa arrives on the scene to set everything right.
23	"Message in a Bottle"	Christian Choquet and Prakash Topsy	Christopher Assefi	December 23, 1997	123
Gruzzlebeard goes ice-fishing and finds a letter to Santa in a bottle. It is from a boy named Marlo in Animalia, an island where animals talk. Marlo and his parents ended up stranded there but the friendly animals help them enjoy Christmas. Then, an evil troll witch who hates Christmas turns up and turned everybody except him and a number of others, to stone. Gruzzlebeard and Dudley go, deciding to team-up with this witch. When Santa finds out about this, he goes with Thoren and Jordi, but he and Thoren get turned to stone as well. Jordi and the remaining animals all un-due the witch's spell. Santa then defeats the witch by spraying bubble gum at her. He promises to reward Marlo though it isn't specified what Santa is giving him for Christmas.
24	"Balthazar Can't Make Up His Mind"	Christian Choquet and Prakash Topsy	Story by : Christophe Poujol; Teleplay by : Stéphane Cabel and Sandro Agénor	December 24, 1997	124
A boy named Balthazar cannot decide what he wants for Christmas. Santa and the elves decide to visit him and ask him. When Balthazar finds the squirrel Hoppy with them, he decides he wants to keep him, but Hoppy falls out the window and is stolen by a man who sells animals. He decides to sell this rare squirrel, but not if Santa has anything to do about it. Santa gets Hoppy back for Balthazar.
25	"The Longest Night"	Christian Choquet and Prakash Topsy	Stéphane Cabel	December 25, 1997	125
On Christmas Eve, Santa reveals some of his most greatest secrets. Having his elves drink a special syrup, he shows them the Master Clock, a device that can stop time so he could make his runs every year. Those who drink the syrup are immune to its effects, but Gruzzlebeard takes two glasses of the syrup, planning to destroy the clock so that Santa can't complete his run. While Guilfi and Balbo are left behind to watch over the workshop, Santa, Jordi and Thoren go out to deliver all the gifts. Gruzzlebeard gives Balbo trick honey that makes him sleep and trapped Guilfi in a cage. He then proceeds to destroy the clock. Instead of what he was expecting, everything else in time went backwards, right back to the prehistoric times. The others return the North Pole, free Guilfi and head inside the room where the Clock is. They were able to fix the damage and fast forward time to its original point. Gruzzlebeard tries to trap them in the room, only for Dudley to point out that he boarded up the wrong door. Guilfi is invited on the Christmas run while Dudley and Balbo keep Gruzzlebeard occupied by throwing snowballs at him.
26	"Santa Claus' Secrets"	Jean-Louis Bompoint and Christian Choquet	Stéphane Cabel	December 26, 1997	126
Continuing off from the last episode, Santa and his elves continue their Christmas run. As they arrive in a city, Santa and Guilfi head to a young boy's apartment. Though Guilfi suggests getting in the "old-fashioned way", Santa has a better idea; he uses a magical dust to bring other toys inside to life so they could get in. Gruzzlebeard however escapes his comical torture from Balbo and Dudley and uses his guitar and amplifiers to wreck the Master Clock. With time running again, Santa and his elves had to make the last three deliveries to the West before it is too late. As they arrive in the desert, they are attacked by a pack of dingos. Though Jordi wasn't able to get them to stop, Santa talks sense into them. They get to a nomadic camp and deliver the present. The second-last stop was at a rainforest. While Santa and Thoren make their way through the forest and are attacked by a panther, which they catapult away, the others are caught between crocodiles and piranhas. Returning to the sleigh, Thoren sprinkles more of the magic dust to freeze the lake they landed upon. Meanwhile, Balbo tries to stop Gruzzlebeard but gets caught and Santa's nemesis decides to stop him before he delivered the last present. As Santa makes his way to Greenland, where a young Billy lives, the reindeer get very tired, so they temporarily have storks help them. When they arrives, they find a note from Gruzzlebeard, saying that he had caught Billy, but it was just a trap; Billy was home in bed the whole time. Gruzzlebeard locks the four in a glass cage and as a token of his appreciation, he leaves the key - if they can get it. Santa tells Guilfi he can get them out by selecting a magically power that was inside him all along. Guilfi then telekinetically lifts the key to free them. They managed to get Billy his present and later returned the one Gruzzlebeard left. When they come home, they free Balbo. Santa promotes Guilfi to master elf for outstanding bravery. He then shows one of his last secret: how to make a delicious Yule Log. His elves then tell him there is one last present to deliver: a globe for him that can show the faces of all the kids he made smile.

== See also ==
- List of Christmas films
- Santa Claus in film
