= Bruce Dinsmore =

Canadian actor

- Born: Vancouver, British Columbia, Canada
- Education: National Theatre School of Canada
- Occupation: Actor
- Years active: 1993–present
- Known for: The Little Lulu Show; Arthur; The Secret World of Santa Claus; Mumble Bumble

Bruce Dinsmore is a Canadian actor. He voices Tubby Tompkins from The Little Lulu Show, Binky Barnes and David Read from Arthur, Rudolph the Red-Nosed Reindeer from The Secret World of Santa Claus, Horace in Wimzie's House and Greens the Frog from Mumble Bumble and has contributed motion capture and voice performances in numerous video games, notably as Paul Revere in Assassin's Creed III, Maximilien Robespierre in Assassin's Creed Unity, and Bill Taggart in Deus Ex: Human Revolution.

== Early life ==
Dinsmore was born in Vancouver to Ann (née Brown) and Norman Dinsmore. He is a graduate of the National Theatre School of Canada.

== Career ==
He voices Binky Barnes and David Read in Arthur, Tubby Tompkins in The Little Lulu Show, Horace in Wimzie's House, and Jervis Coltrane and Mr. Hutchins in seasons 2 and 3 of What's with Andy?. He also voiced Bernie the Hermit Crab in H_{2}O: Mermaid Adventures, Mike in the Cinélume dub of Winx Club, and Poe the Spider in Spookley the Square Pumpkin.

Dinsmore also did episodes of the YTV series Prank Patrol and starred in the film The Myth of the Male Orgasm.

=== Specifics on Arthur ===
Dismore did an interview with the Arthur fan podcast Elwood City Limits in 2018 and spoke in-depth about his voice roles on that series. In particular, he spoke about his role as Arthur's father: "I've really only started to feel comfortable doing Dad in the last three or four years." He said he had started voicing "Dad" when he was rather young and being older and having children in real life by 2018 he felt he has started to "earn that role".

In November 2018, Dinsmore revealed that he had finished recording the final episodes in advance, nearly four years before the show's conclusion in 2022.
