= Katak: The Brave Beluga =

- Theatrical release poster
- French: Katak, le brave béluga
- Directed by: Christine Dallaire-Dupont; Nicola Lemay
- Written by: Andrée Lambert
- Produced by: Nancy Florence Savard
- Starring: Robert Naylor; Alexandre Bacon
- Edited by: René Caron
- Music by: Uberko
- Animation by: Yann Tremblay
- Production company: 10th Ave. Productions
- Distributed by: Attraction Distribution
- Release date: February 24, 2023
- Running time: 82 minutes
- Country: Canada
- Languages: English; French

Katak: The Brave Beluga (French: Katak, le brave béluga) is a Canadian animated film, directed by Christine Dallaire-Dupont and Nicola Lemay and released in 2023. The film centres on Katak, a young beluga living in the Saguenay Fjord who has a reputation as a late bloomer as he is still grey and has not turned white like most belugas his age; eager to prove his maturity and courage, he embarks on a quest to find his grandfather in the northern sea.

The film was released in both English and French versions, with Ginette Reno as the sole cast member who voiced the same character in both languages.

The film's production was first announced in 2020, under the working title Beluga Blues.

== Plot ==
Katak is a beluga calf who has yet to turn white like others his age. He lives in the Saguenay Fjord National Park with a pod of beluga whales which include his overprotective mother Marina, his pregnant aunt Estelle, his friends Lulu and Naya, the elder beluga Bosco, his dying grandmother and Alby who frequently picks on Katak. Katak's grandmother frequently tells Katak the story of his grandfather whom he is named after and how he was the first one to survive an encounter with Jack-Knife, a killer whale who eats anyone he encounters. He fell in love with Katak's grandmother, but he left for the Arctic before he could find out about her pregnancy. The pod is slowly dying out due to the belugas failing to have babies, and Estelle suffers a miscarriage after being stressed out by the sound of a boat horn. Bosco believes the pod will have to move south to survive, but when Katak overhears a conversation about his grandmother possibly losing the will to live due to Estelle's miscarriage, he decides to head to the Arctic to bring his grandfather back to his grandmother.

While on his way to the Arctic, Katak meets a sturgeon named Cyrano who decides to accompany him, and he also encounters Jack-Knife whom he barely escapes from. Katak later meets Jack-Knife's daughter Jack-Lyn who is a vegetarian and does not want to be a predator like her father. Animals that Katak meets on his journey soon began talking about his journey to the Arctic, and after overhearing the animals and learning that Katak is the grandson of the whale who bested him in combat, Jack-Knife becomes determined to eat Katak as revenge for his defeat. Jack-Lyn accompanies her father so she can keep making sure Katak and Cyrano are able to evade him. Katak and Jack-Lyn quickly become friends during their numerous encounters with each other, and Jack-Lyn later helps Katak escape her father after he is cornered by him again. Jack-Knife has a falling out with his daughter upon learning of her friendship with Katak and how she is against his mission. When the pod of belugas learn of Katak's disappearance, Lulu, Bosco, Alby and Naya set out to find Katak and bring him home. They learn where he is heading from the animals he met and set out for the Arctic as well.

Cyrano gets sick during his travels with Katak, but he continues to stay by his side. When Katak and Cyrano finally reach the Arctic, Bosco's group arrives shortly afterwards and get separated from Alby when a nearby iceberg collapses next to them. Katak and Cyrano find Alby and bring him back to the other whales, and Bosco's group joins Katak on his mission to find his grandfather. Cyrano later bids Katak farewell so he doesn't continue to get sick. When the whales stop to rest for the night, the water around them turns to ice and traps them in an area with no open water, but thanks to Katak being able to hold his breath for a long time, he is able to find open water and lead the other whales there. The whales are then attacked by a polar bear, but Jack-Lyn and Jack-Knife come to their rescue and help them escape. Jack-Knife then reconciles with his daughter and before he is eaten by a polar bear, he tells him to live her life how she wants to.

Katak and the other belugas continue their journey and eventually find another pod of beluga whales. Katak finally meets his grandfather who agrees to go home with him to be with his love again, and the rest of the pod decides to accompany Katak's group back home as well so both pods can have a better chance of surviving. While the whales head home, Katak meets Jack-Lyn again and comforts her over the loss of her father. The two agree they will be friends for life and are confident that they will see each other again one day. When the pod returns home, Alby apologizes to Katak for picking on him.

In a mid-credits scene, Katak's grandmother passes away and Estelle finally gives birth to a daughter of her own. As Katak welcomes the new member of the pod, Cyrano arrives to visit him.

== Cast ==
Character	English voice	French voice
Katak	Robert Naylor	Alexandre Bacon
Lulu	Skyler Clark	Ludivine Reding
Sim	Eleanor Noble	Carolanne Foucher
Albi	Wyatt Bowen	Jérémie Desbiens
Paparazzi	Mark Camacho	Benoît Brière
Estelle	Angela Galuppo	Justine Major
Grandma	Ginette Reno	Ginette Reno
Marina/Marine	Eleanor Noble	Guylaine Tremblay
Bosco	Richard M. Dumont	Jeff Boudreault
Naya	Ilana Zackon	Justine Major
Scoop	Wyatt Bowen	Martin Drainville
Old Katak	Richard M. Dumont	Maxime Le Flaguais
Old Nic	Terrence Scammell	Jacques Leblanc
Jack-Lyn	Angela Galuppo	Émilie Josset
Jack-Knife	Terrence Scammell	Mario Saint-Amand
Cyrano	Arthur Holden	Yves Jacques
Polestar	Jennifer Seguin	Carolanne Foucher
Northstar	Pauline Little	Carolanne Foucher

== Distribution ==
The film opened in theatres on February 24, 2023. By the end of March, in its fifth week of release, it had grossed $1.5 million across Canada.

It was subsequently released internationally, notably opening on over 300 screens in France in October.

== Critical response ==
Amélie Revert of Le Devoir rated the film four stars, praising its environmental message about the melting of Arctic ice.

Cath Clarke of The Guardian rated the film three out of five, calling it "a fairly tepid and gentle-going adventure" and writing that its climax, in which Katak must battle a polar bear, was perhaps too reminiscent of Watership Down to be appropriate for younger children.

== Awards ==
The film won four awards at the Festival de cinéma en famille de Québec, for people's choice, best screenplay, best art direction and a special mention from the youth jury.

The film received two Prix Iris nominations at the 25th Quebec Cinema Awards in 2023, for Most Successful Film Outside Quebec and the Public Prize.
