= Kid Paddle (TV series) =

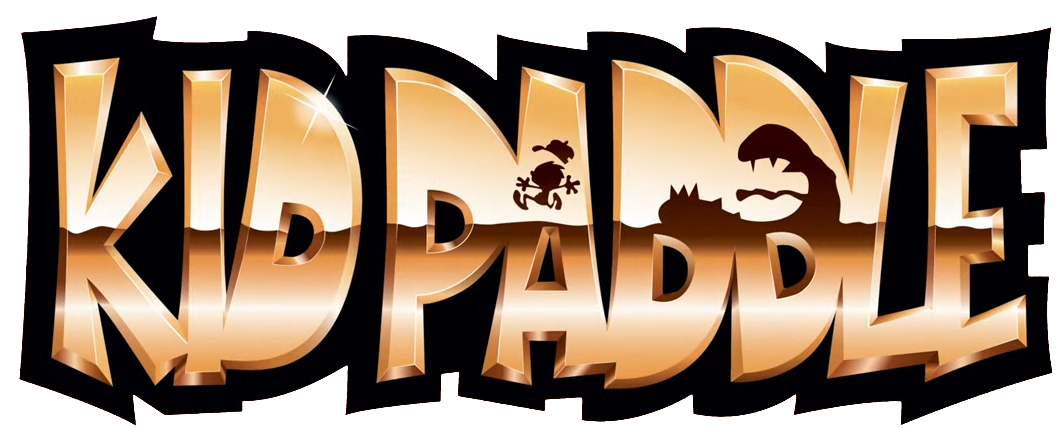
- Genre: Comedy; Black comedy Slapstick
- Created by: Midam
- Developed by: Michel Gauthier; Laurent Rullier
- Written by: Claude Prothee; Ilya Nicolas; Jacques Espagne; Stephen Ashton; Ghislaine Poujoul; Christophe Poujoul; Laurent Rullier; Julien Gars; Claude Gars; Thomas Lapierre; Laurent Bounoure; Manon Berthelet; Olivier Jean-Marie; Anne Lecours; Daniel Williams; Lienne Sawatsky; Muguette Berthelet; Stéphane Chapuy; Augusto Zanovello; Philippe Pierre-Adolphé; Franck Salomé; Aline Leblon; Michel Ledent (credited as Midam); Frederick Maslanka; Philippe Daniau; Nasser Zeboudj
- Directed by: Olivier Bonnet
- Voices of: Jennifer Seguin; Daniel Brochu; Eleanor Noble; Pauline Little; Arthur Holden; A.J. Henderson; Jessica Kardos
- Opening theme: "Kid Paddle Theme"
- Ending theme: "Kid Paddle Ending"
- Composers: Kevin Morane; Mark Lipsky
- Country of origin: Canada
- Original languages: French; English
- No. of seasons: 2
- No. of episodes: 52 (104 segments)

Production
- Executive producers: Olivier Nomen; Andre A. Bélanger; Luc Chatelain
- Running time: 23 minutes (12 minutes per segment)
- Production company: Spectra Animation

Original release
- Network: Teletoon; Télétoon
- Release: July 1, 2003 – February 19, 2006

Related
- Toopy and Binoo; Fred's Head

Kid Paddle is an animated television series based on the comic book series of the same name created by Belgian cartoonist Midam. The series was produced by Spectra Animation in association with Dupuis, and premiered on September 1, 2003.

== Synopsis ==
The cartoon is based on the adventures of a young boy, named Kid Paddle, a video game enthusiast with his two friends Horace and Big Bang.

== Production ==
The show was made in collaboration with M6.

== Cast ==
- Jennifer Seguin as Kid Paddle
- Daniel Brochu as Benji Big Bang
- Eleanor Noble as Horace Beckett
- Arthur Holden as Mr. Paddle
- Pauline Little as Carole Paddle
- Jessica Kardos as Max
- A.J. Henderson as Grandpa Paddle
- John Stocker as additional voices

== Episodes ==
Originally, four cartoons were developed for television. Then, an additional 48 episodes were ordered. Both seasons consist of 52 11-minute episodes or 26 22-minute episodes. The production codes are listed on the show's YouTube channel in French.

=== Series overview ===
Season	Episodes	Originally released	
Season	Episodes	First released	Last released
1	26	July 1, 2003	October 21, 2003
2	26	2003	January 15, 2006

=== Season 1 (2003) ===
No.	Title	Written by	Original release date	French airdate	Prod. code	French viewers (millions)
1	"Arachnoid Menace" / "Lights, Camera, Cut..."	Laurent Rullier	September 1, 2003 September 2, 2003	TBA	101 102	N/A
Horace accidentally eats a spider under a park bench after Kid and Big Bang talked to him about how to eat candy bugs. / Kid wants to win a contest, so he counts on Big Bang and Horace to help him.
2	"Summer Camp Fugitives" / "Game Not Over"	Laurent Rullier / Franck Salomé, Ilya Nicolas and Michel Ledent	September 3, 2003 September 4, 2003	TBA	104 108	N/A
Kid and his friends are sent to a not-so-fun summer camp, powered by not-so-friendly G.I. Jane! Kid is the only one who can save his pals - by challenging Jane to a thumb wrestling battle. / The school bully wants Big Bang and Kid to fix his broken portable video game system. Kid tries it out at City Games, making the games malfunction in the area. The game hater Mr. Mirador notices this, then takes away the game! Will Kid and Big Bang retrieve it?
3	"The Escapees of Colony" / "Megalloween"	Laurent Rullier / Philippe Pierre-Adolphé and Stéphane Chapuy	September 5, 2003 September 6, 2003	TBA	103 112	N/A
4	"Vote Paddle!" / "The Werewolf"	Michel Ledent, Ilya Nicolas and Frederick Maslanka / Aline Leblon	September 7, 2003 September 8, 2003	TBA	107 118	N/A
5	"It Turns" / "Tooth for Tooth"	Frederick Maslanka / Michel Ledent, Ilya Nicolas, Philippe Daniau and Nasser Zeboudj	September 9, 2003 September 10, 2003	TBA	116 121	N/A
6	"Blork and Gore" / "The Jellyfish Beach"	Claude Prothee and Frederick Maslanka / Stéphane Chapuy and Philippe Pierre-Adolphé	September 11, 2003 September 12, 2003	TBA	111 124	N/A
7	"Maximum Record" / "Alien TV"	Michel Ledent, Ilya Nicolas and Franck Salomé / Stéphane Chapuy and Philippe Pierre-Adolphé	September 13, 2003 September 14, 2003	TBA	120 114	N/A
8	"Blork Surprise" / "The Ghost Train"	Laurent Rullier and Aline Leblon / Michel Ledent, Ilya Nicolas and Jacques Espagne	September 15, 2003 September 16, 2003	TBA	106 126	N/A
9	"Retirement to the Future" / "The Invasion of the Robots"	Stéphane Chapuy and Philippe Pierre-Adolphé / Michel Ledent, Ilya Nicolas and Aline Leblon	September 17, 2003 September 18, 2003	TBA	119 115	N/A
10	"Mission: Almost Impossible" / "Teacher's Thunder Operation"	Laurent Rullier and Laurent Bounoure / Franck Salomé	September 19, 2003 September 20, 2003	TBA	105 129	N/A
11	"Brainstorming" / "The Duel to Blork Barbarian"	Aline Leblon / Laurent Rullier	September 21, 2003 September 22, 2003	TBA	128 110	N/A
12	"Hubbub" / "The Championship"	Philippe Daniau and Nasser Zeboudj / Franck Salome	September 23, 2003 September 24, 2003	TBA	117 113	N/A
13	"The Karate Kid" / "Virus.com"	Aline Leblon / Philippe Daniau and Nasser Zeboudj	September 25, 2003 September 26, 2003	TBA	133 123	N/A
14	"Ping Pong' / "The False Token"	Jacques Espagne / Franck Salomé	September 27, 2003 September 28, 2003	TBA	127 135	N/A
15	"The Strange Christmas of Mr. Paddle" / "Max's Secret"	Aline Leblon / Lienne Sawatsky and Daniel Williams	September 29, 2003 September 30, 2003	TBA	134 136	N/A
16	"The Mummy's Awakening" / "The Jurassic Noeunoeuf"	Julien Gars and Claude Gars / Frederick Maslanka	October 1, 2003 October 2, 2003	TBA	122 132	N/A
17	"The False Teeth of the Sea" / "Livin' in the Life of Blue"	Thomas LaPierre	October 3, 2003 October 4, 2003	TBA	148 130	N/A
18	"A Disekator Against the Blorks" / "The Ideal Family"	Stephen Ashton / Thomas LaPierre	October 5, 2003 October 6, 2003	TBA	138 139	N/A
19	"Canning" / "Mr. Crypt the Shadowy"	Lienne Sawatsky and Daniel Williams / Stéphane Chapuy and Philippe Pierre-Adolphé	October 7, 2003 October 8, 2003	TBA	150 109	N/A
20	"The Monstrodindor" / "Plastic Surgery"	Franck Salomé / Lienne Sawatsky and Daniel Williams	October 9, 2003 October 10, 2003	TBA	140 131	N/A
21	"Are You There?" / "The Werewolf Radar"	Julien Gars and Claude Gars / Lienne Sawatsky and Daniel Williams	October 11, 2003 October 12, 2003	TBA	125 137	N/A
22	"Mr. Rick Icky" / "The Zombie Hospital"	Stephen Ashton / Lienne Sawatsky and Daniel Williams	October 13, 2003 October 14, 2003	TBA	141 145	N/A
23	"Lice... Ah!" / "The Sleeping Story"	Stephen Ashton / Franck Salomé	October 15, 2003 October 16, 2003	TBA	142 146	N/A
24	"Vice Versa" / "Pustulator"	Thomas LaPierre / Lienne Sawatsky and Daniel Williams	October 17, 2003 October 18, 2003	TBA	143 147	N/A
25	"Superpaddle" / "Meteor Night"	Philippe Daniau and Nasser Zeboudj / Thomas LaPierre	October 19, 2003 October 20, 2003	TBA	149 151	N/A
26	"Horace Clones?" / "The Storm on the Controls"	Franck Salomé	October 21, 2003	TBA	144 152	N/A

=== Season 2 (2003; 2005–06) ===
- The show aired a second season that ran from July 1, 2003 to February 19, 2006.

No.	Title	Written by	Original release date	French airdate	Prod. code	French viewers (millions)
1	"The Piranha" / "At the Light of the Ramp!"	Unknown	July 1, 2003	TBA	TBA	N/A
2	"The Bermuda Triangle" / "Like Dog and Cat!"	TBA	TBA	TBA	TBA	TBD
3	"Humanoid Females" / "Reduced Models"	Laurent Rullier / TBA	January 17, 2005	October 3, 2007	S01E03	N/A
4	"A Superstar's Joystick" / "The Flies" "Moucha Mutantus"	TBA	TBA	TBA	S01E04	TBD
5	"The Medical Visit" / "Somethin' Girls"	José-Louis Bocquet and Philippe Pierre-Adolphé / TBA	January 31, 2005	TBA	S01E05	N/A
6	"The Funny Meeting" / "The Virtual Disaster"	Unknown	February 7, 2005	TBA	S01E06	N/A
7	"The Circle of the Missing Joysticks" / "Kimitomo"	TBA	TBA	TBA	S01E07	TBD
8	"Don't Touch My City Game" / "Fan #2"	Unknown	February 21, 2005	TBA	S01E08	N/A
9	"Genetic Tampering" / "Poor Carole"	Unknown	February 28, 2005	TBA	S01E09	N/A
10	"Horace Outdoes Himself" / "The Voodoo Cow"	Unknown	March 7, 2005	TBA	S01E10	N/A
11	"Say It With Flowers" / "Kid Loses the Ball"	Ghislaine Poujoul / Stéphane Chapuy	TBA	TBA	S01E11	TBD
12	"The Return of the Mummy" / "No Romeo for Carole"	TBA	TBA	TBA	S01E12	TBD
13	"Not Seen on TV" / "The Red Card"	Unknown	March 21, 2005	TBA	S01E13	N/A
14	"The Paddle Family Barbeque" / "The Red Line"	Christophe Poujoul and Augusto Zanovello / TBA	March 28, 2005	TBA	S01E14	N/A
15	"The Handyman Always Saws Twice" / "The Extraterrestrial Alert"	Unknown	April 4, 2005	TBA	S01E15	N/A
16	"The Crazy Remote Control" / "The Hunters"	Olivier Jean-Marie / Laurent Rullier	April 11, 2005	TBA	S01E16	N/A
17	"Surprise" / "The Treasure of the Blorks!"	Unknown	April 18, 2005	TBA	S01E17	N/A
18	"Upside-Down" / "Kid the Soothsayer"	Stéphane Chapuy and Elisabeth Andreev / Anne Lecours	April 25, 2005	TBA	S01E18	N/A
19	"Kid: No Longer Playing" / "Paddle Story"	Manon Berthelet and Muguette Berthelet / Christophe Poujol and Augusto Zanovello	May 2, 2005	TBA	S01E19	N/A
20	"Hell is Pink" / "Marriage Instructions"	Unknown	May 9, 2005	TBA	S01E20	N/A
21	"The Irradiated" / "Objection"	TBA / Manon Berthelet and Muguette Berthelet	May 16, 2005	TBA	S01E21	N/A
22	"The Floutch" / "All-Stars"	TBA / Franck Salomé	May 23, 2005	TBA	S01E22	N/A
23	"Fear on the Air" / "The Double-Virus"	TBA / Laurent Rullier	May 30, 2005	TBA	S01E23	N/A
24	"The Song of the Sirens" / "The Radar is Gone"	Lienne Sawatsky & Daniel Williams	June 6, 2005	TBA	S01E24	N/A
25	"Tronchard: Saved from the Waters" / "The Return of the Zombies"	Philippe Daniau and Nasser Zeboudj / TBA	June 13, 2005	TBA	S01E25	N/A
26	"D-Day" / "Kid is Not Careful"	Unknown	May 20, 2005	TBA	S01E26	N/A
