= Sahara (2017 film) =

- Theatrical release poster
- Directed by: Pierre Coré
- Screenplay by: Pierre Coré; Nessim Debbiche; Stéphane Kazandjian
- Story by: Pierre Coré
- Produced by: Eric Altmayer; Nicolas Altmayer; Pierre Coré; Michel Cortey; Christian Ronget; Claude Léger; Johnathan Vanger
- Starring: Omar Sy; Louane Emera; Franck Gastambide; Vincent Lacoste; Grand Corps Malade
- Edited by: Fanny Bouquard
- Music by: Jérôme Rebotier; Heitor Pereira (USA)
- Production companies: Mandarin Cinéma; La Station Animation; Transfilm International
- Distributed by: StudioCanal; Netflix
- Release dates: 18 January 2017 (L'Alpe d'Huez Film Festival); 12 May 2017 (United States)
- Running time: 84 minutes
- Countries: France; Canada
- Languages: French; English
- Box office: $8.1 million

Sahara is a 2017 CGI animated adventure film directed by Pierre Coré and distributed by StudioCanal and Netflix. The film was released on January 18, 2017, and received mixed reviews from critics, praising its visuals, humour, music and choreography but condemning its plot and pacing.

== Plot ==
In the Sahara desert, where the animals are called "Dusties", Ajar the cobra and his best friend, Pitt the scorpion, steal a watermelon from a camelcade, only to have it taken by an older cobra named Saladin. The duo are a frequent target of belittling by Saladin and are viewed as outcasts. Ajar, tired of being a "loser", decides they should go into the Oasis, a haven for the rich and highly sophisticated green snakes but is forbidden to the Dusties.

Ajar disguises himself as a green snake and then enters the Oasis. He meets a green snake named Eva, who disguised herself as a Dusty in attempt to escape the Oasis. They are then ambushed by Secretary birds, who chase them to the edge of a cliff. Eva and Ajar jump off the cliff, landing in a river. The disguises wash off in the river, revealing their true identities to one another. Being a Dusty, Ajar is not able to swim and almost drowns, but is saved by Eva, who revives him with mouth-to-mouth resuscitation. Ajar and Eva become best friends after that, and Ajar falls in love with Eva, but Eva is then captured by Omar, a snake charmer and skinner.

Ajar gives chase, joined by Pitt, but they are captured by Chief-Chief, one of the secretary birds guarding the Oasis. The two are taken to the birds' base, where Chief-Chief and the other birds threaten to kill them. However, Ajar uses Gary, Eva's lazy and dim-witted brother, as a hostage, and they escape on the back of one of the secretary birds. When Pitt accidentally stings the bird, it loses consciousness and the trio continue on the ground.

Meanwhile, Eva meets other snakes that have been caught by Omar, including the coral snake twins, Lulu Belle and Lily Belle, a charming green snake named George, a white snake named Pietra, who dislikes her, but greets her like the others do, and a red python named Rita. The snakes tell Eva of their professions, and Omar then takes them all out, where he plays the flute. Eva tries to escape Omar, but is hypnotized by the sound of the flute and goes back. When the snakes are returned into the basket, Pietra offers Eva a method of escape through a hole in the basket in an attempt to get rid of her. However, both are caught by Omar, and he forces them to compete in a dance-off. Eva wins, while Pietra is put into the basket of snakes that are to be skinned.

Gary, Ajar, and Pitt, still on their quest, fall into a cave, where they are greeted by Glow-Worms. The Glow-Worm King gives them directions to find Eva, but then try to lure them in as prey, and the three narrowly escape. Soon after, they climb into a jeep with some tourists, but are discovered and Pitt is separated from the others. They then find a fast-talking sandfish, who leaves them with the name, Souksoukville, then leaves. Ajar and Gary find an oasis, where they rest for the night and slowly become friends after Ajar reveals he and Pitt are the only friends they have (since Pitt's family was killed by the Tuaregs) and Gary reveals he has no friends at all. Pitt stays at the tourists' camp, where he joins a group of scorpions.

Ajar and Gary find a well at the oasis. They ride a bucket down to escape a sandstorm, and, after encountering further challenges, they arrive at another town. They follow Omar's ads to get to his store, where Ajar sees Eva and the other snakes trapped in a cage, and George embracing Eva. Mistaking the encounter for a romantic one, Ajar almost gives up on his quest until he releases a ceiling fan, which falls on top of the cage, freeing all the snakes. Omar sees this and runs to get his flute, but Ajar takes it.

Omar pursues Ajar around the city, where the sandstorm rages. Ajar is chased at the top of a mosque, where Omar tries to grab the flute, but breaks it. He grabs Ajar so he doesn't fall off the building, but Ajar's skin comes off, and Omar disappears into the sandstorm. The storm calms, and Ajar falls onto a platform below. He is found by Eva and Gary and is thought to be dead, much to their dismay, but he then awakens. Eva realizes that Ajar had crossed a desert for her, and the two kiss. Omar then appears, but falls unconscious after Pitt stings him. He introduces them to Emily, a scorpion from the group he had stayed with earlier. Ajar, Eva, Emily, Pitt, Gary, and Pietra drive away in a tourist car.

As the van drives off, the fast-talking sandfish appears next to a camel, and tells it that Ajar and Eva might go back and live happily ever after at the Oasis and teach the Dusties and Green Snakes to live together as equals, but he claims to have no idea on whether or not this happens.

== Voice cast ==
French and English voice actors are listed:

- Omar Sy and Robert Naylor - Ajar
- Louane Emera and Angela Galuppo - Eva
- Franck Gastambide and Daniel Brochu - Pitt
- Vincent Lacoste and Mark Hauser - Gary
- Grand Corps Malade and Brady Moffatt - Omar
- Roschdy Zem and Mathew Mackay - Saladin
- Jonathan Lambert and Richard Dumont - Michael
- Marie-Claude Pietragalla and Nadia Verrucci - Pietra
- Mathilde Seigner and Sonja Ball - Rita, Lulu Belle
- Jean Dujardin and Andrew Shaver - George
- Michaël Youn and Rick Jones - Sandfish
- Clovis Cornillac and Rick Jones - Glow Worm King
- Reem Kherici - Alexandrie
- Arthur Holden - Sergeant
- Terrence Scammell - Chief Chief
- Matthew Stefiuk - Snake Eagle
- Elana Dunkelman - Emily, Lily Belle
- Marie-Claude Pietragalla - Pietra
- Ramzy Bedia - Chief Chief
- Sabrina Ouazani - Alexandra

== Production ==
The voicing of Ajar was difficult for Omar Sy due to the fact that the character was a teenage snake and Omar needed to express excitement, fragility and a lack of self-confidence.

== Accolades ==
Sahara was nominated and named in the category "Best Animation Film" at Les Cesar Academy 2018. It was the first French animated film at the box office in 2017.
