= The Legend of Sarila =

2013 Canadian animated film

- Film poster
- French: La Légende de Sarila
- Directed by: Nancy Florence Savard
- Written by: Roger Harvey; Paul Risacher (English adaptation); Pierre Tremblay
- Produced by: Marie-Claude Beauchamp; Paul Risacher; Nancy Florence Savard
- Edited by: Arthur Tarnowski; Robert Yates
- Music by: Olivier Auriol
- Production companies: 10th Ave. Productions; CarpeDiem Film & TV
- Distributed by: Alliance Vivafilm
- Release date: 22 February 2013
- Running time: 82 minutes
- Country: Canada
- Language: English
- Budget: $8.5 million CAD

The Legend of Sarila (French: La Légende de Sarila) is a 2013 Canadian animated adventure film and Canada's first 3D animated feature film. The film draws heavily on Inuit culture and tradition. Set in northern Canada in 1910, it tells the story of three young Inuit, who set out for the legendary land of Sarila in search of food for their clan. One of them, Markussi, finds out during their adventures that he is really an Inuit shaman, while the clan's shaman at home repeatedly attempts to kill him and undermine their quest.

The film was picked up for distribution in the United States by Phase 4 Films, under the title Frozen Land (not to be confused with the Finnish movie Frozen Land) and with an adapted logo in order to mimic Disney's Frozen, which resulted in a lawsuit with Disney.

== Plot ==
The young orphan Markussi lives with his little sister Mipoulok in an Inuit clan. Markussi can talk to animals and has some special powers unique to shamans. He does not want to be a shaman though and mainly keeps his powers a secret because he fears being a shaman would make him like the clan's shaman Croolik. Croolik grew selfish and unjust after the deaths of his sons, who died along with Markussi's father in an accident on a hunting trip. Croolik blames his sons' deaths on his now-separated wife Saya (who he accuses of having let their sons go hunting at too young an age) and Markussi's father. By extension, Croolik also hates Markussi.

At the beginning of the film, Croolik secretly turns away from the goddess Sedna and tries to call on the spirit of darkness. In punishment, Sedna takes all animals away from the clan's lands, provoking a dangerous food shortage and lack of tradable pelts.

Desperate, the clan decides to search for Sarila, a legendary land where animals are said to be plenty. Under Croolik's influence—who intends Markussi to die on the quest—three young Inuit are selected: Markussi, along with his two friends, Putulik (son of the clan chief), and Apik, who were promised to each other when they were children. Saya, who now lives on her own as a healer, offers to take care of Markussi's young sister and her dog Kajuk in his absence.

The three friends leave the clan with sled dogs and Apik's pet lemming Kimi. On their quest, they face several dangers, repeatedly brought on by Croolik through magic; this includes possessing Putulik by means of twin amulets (called "medallions"), so that Putulik attacks Markussi. The three young travellers can overcome all dangers, repeatedly saved by Markussi's powers. In the meantime, Croolik frames his former wife Saya for stealing food from the clan and has her banned from the clan.

Eventually the three friends reach Sarila, a warm place full of life, where they can quickly hunt the much-needed food for the clan. Besides, Apik realizes she loves Markussi, who had already shown affection for her before. Markussi is told by Sedna that he has passed all tests, but needs to do one "small thing" for her upon return to the clan, for the animals to be released; when asking what she requires, she only responds that "a true shaman knows what to do" and to "do what you must." Briefly afterwards, Putulik is again possessed by Croolik and tries to kill Markussi, but the lemming Kimi realizes the role of Putulik's amulet and rips it off, freeing Putulik.

Upon return to the clan, Apik tells that she wants to marry Markussi, and her parents consent. Putulik had already agreed earlier. He now wishes to travel and learn more about others' ways before becoming the clan's chief one day.

Croolik is enraged that Markussi is still alive and challenges him. Markussi accepts the magical fight, understanding that this is Sedna's last wish and thereby proving himself a true shaman. Croolik is defeated and, dying, confesses that he framed Saya and asks for her forgiveness.

On behalf of the clan, Markussi formally asks Sedna for forgiveness, and she lets the animals return. Croolik's crow offers his services to Markussi. When he declines, the crow flies away; in the last shot it is seen carrying one of the twin amulets, which lights up in the same way as it did when Putulik was possessed.

== Voice cast ==
- Dustin Milligan as Markussi, an orphan with Shamanic powers
- Rachelle Lefevre as Apik, promised to Putulik when she was a small girl
- Tim Rozon as Putulik, the son of chief Itak; promised to Apik when he was a small boy
- Christopher Plummer as shaman Croolik
- Geneviève Bujold as healer and Croolik's former wife Saya
- Tyrone Benskin as chief Itak and Dawn Ford as his wife Tayara, who is too sick to do anything but moan
- Sonja Ball as Kimi, Apik's lemming
- James Kidnie as Kwatak, Croolik's crow
- Angela Galuppo as Mipoulok, Markussi's sister
- Elias Toufexis as Kauji and Holly O'Brien as Jiniak, Apik's parents
- Robert Higden as the tall hunter Arlok
- Natar Ungalaaq as Markussi's "guardian spirit" Ukpik (the Inuinnaqtun word for snowy owl)
- Elisapie Isaac as the goddess Sedna
- Harry Standjofski as Uliak, another hunter of the clan
- Kajuk, Mipoulik's dog

== Production ==
The $8.5 million production was promoted as Canada's first 3D animated feature film.

== International distribution ==
The international distribution rights are being licensed by Cinema Management Group.

== Reception ==
On the website Rotten Tomatoes, the film counted two favourable and one unfavourable review, too few to compute an average rating. Similarly, the site Metacritic includes a single favourable review (score of 70).

Noting the film's original release, the National Post noted "The film is enjoyable enough, though the plot is as thin as spring ice." The Hollywood Reporter praised "the wonderful voice performances by the ever-reliable Bujold and Plummer", but criticized that the "[n]arratively muddled and visually undistinguished" "film hyperactively lurches from one frenzied action sequence to the next, insuring that young viewers' attention spans won't be too sorely tested. But the one-note characterizations and predictable animation tropes quickly prove wearisome, and despite the exoticism of its setting The Legend of Sarila ultimately fails to enchant."

== Awards ==
Elisapie Isaac and composer Olivier Auriol received a Canadian Screen Award nomination for Best Original Song at the 2nd Canadian Screen Awards in 2014, for the song "Far Away".

== Trademark infringement lawsuit in the United States ==
The film was subject to a trademark infringement suit when Phase 4 Films distributed it as Frozen Land, whose poster bore intentional resemblance to Disney's Frozen.

In late December 2013, The Walt Disney Company filed a trademark infringement lawsuit against Phase 4 Films, the distributor of this film in the United States, which retitled the film as Frozen Land and used a logo that mimicked the one made for Disney's Frozen, which was heavily marketed at the time and to be released in less than three weeks. By late January 2014, the two companies had settled the case; the settlement stated that the distribution and promotion of The Legend of Sarila and related merchandise must use its original title and Phase 4 must not use trademarks, logos or other designs confusingly similar to Disney's animated release. Phase 4 was also required to pay Disney $100,000 before 27 January 2014, and make "all practicable efforts" to remove copies of Frozen Land from stores and online distributors before 3 March 2014.
