= Mission Kathmandu: The Adventures of Nelly and Simon =

Canadian animated film

- French: Nelly et Simon: Mission Yéti
- Directed by: Nancy Florence Savard; Pierre Greco
- Screenplay by: Pierre Greco; André Morency
- Produced by: Nancy Florence Savard
- Edited by: René Caron
- Music by: Olivier Auriol
- Production company: 10th Ave. Productions
- Distributed by: Seville Films
- Release dates: October 5, 2017 (FIFF); February 23, 2018 (Québec)
- Running time: 80 minutes
- Country: Canada
- Language: French
- Budget: $8.5 million

Mission Kathmandu: The Adventures of Nelly and Simon (French: Nelly et Simon: Mission Yéti, lit. 'Nelly and Simon: Mission Yeti'), also known as The Yeti Adventures and A Yeti Adventure, is a 2017 French-language Canadian 3D animated adventure comedy film directed by Nancy Florence Savard and Pierre Greco, from a screenplay by Greco and André Morency. It was the third film produced by 10th Ave. Productions, a film studio which Savard founded. The film received a limited theatrical release in Quebec on 23 February 2018.

== Plot ==
Set in 1950s Quebec, the plot concerns Nelly Maloye, a rookie detective, and Simon Picard, a scientific researcher's assistant. After accidentally meeting one day, they both realise they believe in the yeti and decide to embark on an adventure aimed at proving its existence.

== Voice cast ==
=== English dub ===
- Rachelle Lefevre as Nelly Maloye
- Noel Fisher as Simon Picard
- Colm Feore as Taylor
- Julian Stamboulieh as Tensing Gombu
- Jesse Camacho as Annulu Gombu
- Bronwen Mantel as Shirisha Gombu and Mrs. Martineau)
- Arthur Holden as Edward Martineau; Simon's boss.
- Terrence Scammell as the university guard and captain
- Grant Baciocco as Jazzmi
  - Alexandrine Warren voices Jazzmi in the Canadian English dub
- François Trudel as yetis
- Patrick Ouellet as yetis

== Production ==
Mission Kathmandu: The Adventures of Nelly and Simon was the third film produced by 10th Ave. Productions, a film studio which director Nancy Florence Savard founded. Production for the film began in May 2014, and involved more than 200 people. It was produced almost entirely in Quebec City. At a budget of $8.5 million, the film received financial support from Telefilm Canada and Société de développement des entreprises culturelles.

== Release ==
Mission Kathmandu: The Adventures of Nelly and Simon had its world premiere on 21 October 2017 at the Cinekid Festival in the Netherlands. It received a limited release to 50 screens in Quebec, Canada, on 23 February 2018. It was distributed by Seville Films.

=== Critical reception ===
The film received generally mixed reviews.

André Duchesne, writing for La Presse, stated that "the first 15 minutes of Nelly and Simon – Mission Yéti are the best. […] But when the team lands in Nepal to go to the Himalayas, the story deflates," adding "Thereafter, we chew the same jokes. Like those surrounding the lack of orientation of the two heroes or the endless daredevil slips." Charles-Henri Ramond of Films du Québec gave the film 2.5 stars out of 5, stating, while recognising that the film had a low budget, "Cut for a very young audience, the story turns out to be very predictable and very light, which only very minimally exploits the folklore of the tales and legends surrounding this half-man half-ape beast [yeti]." Ramond praised the performance of Sylvie Moreau.
