= 10th Ave. Productions =

Canadian animation studio

10th Ave. Productions (French: 10e Ave Productions) is a Canadian animation studio, headed by producer Nancy Florence Savard.

Launched in 1998 in Saint-Augustin-de-Desmaures, the company produced short films and television programs before releasing its first full-length animated feature, The Legend of Sarila (La Légende de Sarila), in 2013.

The studio has since also released the films The Rooster of St. Victor (La Coq de St-Victor) in 2014, Mission Kathmandu: The Adventures of Nelly and Simon (Nelly et Simon: Mission Yéti) in 2017, Felix and the Treasure of Morgäa (Félix et le trésor de Morgäa) in 2021, and Katak: The Brave Beluga (Katak, le brave béluga) in 2023.

In 2022, Savard received the inaugural Prix Rock-Demers from the Festival international du film pour enfants de Montréal.

== History and studio expansion ==
The studio launched its initial operations creating short films and television programs before transitioning into full-length commercial cinema. In 2013, the company achieved a milestone by producing The Legend of Sarila, which was marketed as Canada's first 3D stereoscopic animated feature film.

In 2018, the production house strategically restructured by establishing its own internal, dedicated boutique branch named 10th Ave Animation. This infrastructure expansion allowed the company to keep its technical pipeline and creative asset development entirely in-house, shifting away from a reliance on external technical subcontractors . In recognition of her contributions to children's cinema, founder Nancy Florence Savard was awarded the inaugural Prix Rock-Demers by the Festival International du "Film pour Enfants de Montréal" (FIFEM) in 2022.

== Films ==
- The Legend of Sarila (La Légende de Sarila) - 2013
- The Rooster of St. Victor (La Coq de St-Victor) - 2014
- Mission Kathmandu: The Adventures of Nelly and Simon (Nelly et Simon: Mission Yéti) - 2017
- Felix and the Treasure of Morgäa (Félix et le trésor de Morgäa) - 2021
- Katak: The Brave Beluga (Katak, le brave béluga) - 2023
- Lydia and the Mist Rider (Lydia et le vaisseau des tempêtes) - 2026
