= Eleanor Noble =

Canadian actress

- Born: June 15, 1980 (age 46); Montreal, Quebec, Canada
- Occupation: Actress
- Years active: 1993–present

Eleanor Noble (born June 15, 1980) is a Canadian actress. She is President of the Alliance of Canadian Cinema, Television and Radio Artists (ACTRA).

== Career ==
She voiced Lori Mackney in later episodes of What's with Andy? following Jaclyn Linetsky's death, and George Lundgren in Arthur. She acted onscreen in the sixth season of the MTV anthology series Undressed, also as Shelley in the episode "Tale of the Dark Dragon" as well as a genie named Belle in the episode "Tale of the Time Trap", on the Nickelodeon show Are You Afraid of the Dark?. She played Angie Burns in Season 4 of The Mystery Files of Shelby Woo. She also voiced the character of Maria Thorpe in the Assassin's Creed series, Icy in the Cinélume English dub of Winx Club, and Periwinkle Bellflower in The Bellflower Bunnies.

In 2021, she was elected President of ACTRA for a two-year term.

== Filmography ==
Videogames
Year	Title	Role	Notes
2001	Wizardry 8	Additional voices	voice
2001	Spaced Out	Betty Martin	voice
2002	Evolution Worlds	Monica/Veronica	voice
2002	Sagwa, the Chinese Siamese Cat	Bei-Hu	voice
2002	Splinter Cell	Additional voices	voice
2003	Martin Morning	Roxanne	voice
2003	My Friend Marsupilami	Zoe Newman, Bobo, Bibi, Bibu	voice
2003	Kid Paddle	Horace Becquet	voice
2004	Arthur	George Lundgren	voice
2004	Prince of Persia: Warrior Within	Blade-dancers	voice
2004–2008	Winx Club	Icy/Mitzi (S1–2)/Diaspro (S1)	Cinelume English version
2005	Boule et Bill	Caroline, Additional voices	voice
2005	Prince of Persia: The Two Thrones	Additional Voices	voice
2006–2007	What's with Andy?	Lori Mackney	voice
2007	Naruto: Rise of a Ninja	Additional Voices	English Version voice
2007	Assassin's Creed	Maria Thorpe	voice
2011	Assassin's Creed: Revelations	Maria Thorpe	voice
2011	Jack	Nico	voice
2011	Supernatural: The Animation	Katherine Boyle	English Version voice
2012	Assassin's Creed III	Ellen	voice
2021	Felix and the Treasure of Morgäa	Charlotte	voice
2022	Arthur, malédiction	Mathilde	voice, English version
2023	Katak: The Brave Beluga	Sim, Marine	voice, English version
2026	Samuel	All Characters	voice, English version
