= Lydia and the Mist Rider =

2026 Canadian animated adventure film

- French: Lydia et le vaisseau des tempêtes
- Directed by: Émilie Rosas; Philippe Arseneau Bussières; Nancy Florence Savard
- Written by: Émilie Rosas
- Based on: Le vaisseau des tempêtes and Prince des glaces by Yves Meynard
- Produced by: Nancy Florence Savard
- Starring: Sophie Nélisse; Mizinga Mwinga; Sarah Booth; Anthony Kavanagh
- Edited by: René Caron
- Music by: Jean-François Racine
- Animation by: Yann Tremblay
- Production company: 10th Ave. Productions
- Distributed by: Maison 4:3
- Release date: February 20, 2026
- Running time: 85 minutes
- Country: Canada
- Languages: French; English

Lydia and the Mist Rider (French: Lydia et le vaisseau des tempêtes, lit. "Lydia and the Storm Ship") is a Canadian animated aventure film, directed by Émilie Rosas, Philippe Arseneau Bussières and Nancy Florence Savard, and released in 2026. The film centres on Lydia, a young girl who sets out to find her older brother Thaddeus after he is abducted by a Spellbinder; picked up by an airborne sailing ship called the Dolphin, she becomes an apprentice astromagician to learn the skills she will need to succeed in her quest.

The film was released in both English and French versions, with Sophie Nélisse voicing Lydia in both languages. The supporting voice cast includes Mizinga Mwinga, Hasani Freeman, Sarah Booth, Anna Hopkins, Nico DeCastris, Kathleen Fee, Mark Camacho, Arthur Holden and Alexandre Bacon in English, and Anthony Kavanagh, Maxime Desjardins, Eveline Gélinas, Guy Nadon, Gildor Roy, Dorothée Berryman, Alexandre Bacon, Lyndz Dantiste, Kevin Houle and Philomène Bilodeau in French.

Adapted from the children's fantasy novels Le vaisseau des tempêtes and Prince des glaces by Yves Meynard, production on the film began in 2023. A preview excerpt from the film was screened at the Cannes Film Market in 2025.

The film was released to theatres in Quebec on February 20, 2026, followed by a release in France in August.
