= Mother! =

2017 film by Darren Aronofsky

- Theatrical release poster
- Directed by: Darren Aronofsky
- Written by: Darren Aronofsky
- Produced by: Scott Franklin; Ari Handel
- Starring: Jennifer Lawrence; Javier Bardem; Ed Harris; Michelle Pfeiffer
- Cinematography: Matthew Libatique
- Edited by: Andrew Weisblum
- Production company: Protozoa Pictures
- Distributed by: Paramount Pictures
- Release dates: September 5, 2017 (Venice); September 15, 2017 (United States)
- Running time: 121 minutes
- Country: United States
- Language: English
- Budget: $30 million
- Box office: $44.5 million

Mother! is a 2017 American psychological horror film written and directed by Darren Aronofsky. It stars Jennifer Lawrence, Javier Bardem, Ed Harris, Michelle Pfeiffer, Domhnall Gleeson, Brian Gleeson, and Kristen Wiig. Its plot follows a young woman whose tranquil life with her husband at their country home is disrupted by the arrival of a mysterious couple, leading to a series of increasingly chaotic and destructive events.

Mother! premiered on September 5, 2017, at the 74th Venice International Film Festival, where it competed for the Golden Lion. It was released in the United States by Paramount Pictures on September 15 to generally positive reviews from critics. The film grossed $44.5 million worldwide on $30 million production budget.

== Plot ==
In the burned-out remains of a large house, Him, an acclaimed poet struggling with writer's block, places a crystal object on a pedestal in his study, and the building morphs into a beautiful home in an edenic landscape. Mother, the poet's wife and muse, awakens in her bed and wonders aloud where Him is. While renovating the house, she occasionally visualizes a beating heart within its walls.

One day, a stranger called Man turns up at the house, claiming to be an orthopedic surgeon and asking for a room. That night, Man suffers from dry heaves and Mother observes a wound on his side. Man's wife, Woman, arrives the next day. Mother is increasingly frustrated by her guests, but Him begs her to let them stay, revealing that Man is actually a fan whose dying wish was to meet Him. However, when Man and Woman accidentally shatter the crystal object, Him becomes angry and boards up his study. Man and Woman's two sons arrive unexpectedly and fight over Man's will. Oldest Son wounds his brother, and then flees after having his head smashed against glass by Him, leaving a bloody gash in Younger Brother's head.

Him, Man, and Woman take the injured son to the hospital. Mother cleans up and notices strange damage to the house, including a fly, a frog, and blood that will not stop dripping. She follows the blood to a tank of heating oil hidden behind the basement walls. Him informs Mother that Younger Brother has died.

Mother and Him are roused that night when dozens of people arrive unannounced at the house to mourn the dead son. The visitors behave in rude and presumptuous ways that irritate Mother, and she snaps and orders everyone to leave when they break a sink, partially flooding the house. She berates Him for allowing so many people inside and ignoring her needs, but their argument leads to passionate love-making. The next morning, Mother announces she is pregnant, which elates Him and inspires him to start writing again.

Some time later, Mother prepares for the child's arrival and reads Him's beautiful new poem. Upon publication, it is acclaimed and sells well. In celebration, Mother prepares a big dinner, but more fans interrupt. Mother tries to lock the doors, but droves of fans pour inside and begin to wreak havoc, damaging the house. Him is oblivious, but a disoriented Mother watches helplessly as military forces turn up to battle members of the cult that has sprung up around Him; his publicist organizes mass executions. Mother goes into labor and Him reopens his study so she can give birth inside.

The havoc outside subsides. Him finds that the fans have left gifts and are waiting. Him tells Mother that his fans want to see their newborn son, and he does not want them to leave. Mother refuses to hand over the boy to Him, but after she falls asleep, Him takes the child outside to the crowd. They pass the baby around wildly until he is inadvertently killed. Mother finds people eating her son's mutilated corpse. Furious, she attacks them. They turn on her and beat her savagely until Him intervenes. He begs Mother to forgive them, but she runs down to the basement oil-tank and ignites the oil, causing an explosion that incinerates the crowd and destroys the house.

Him is unscathed by the inferno, but Mother is severely burned. She asks him what he is, and he replies, "I am I" and says Mother is "home". He assures her that nothing was her fault and resolves to take her to "the beginning". He asks if her love still exists; with her permission, he removes her heart from her chest, tearing it open to reveal a new crystal object. He places it on the pedestal, transforming the house back into a beautiful home. A new Mother appears in her bed and awakens, wondering aloud where Him is.

== Cast ==
- Jennifer Lawrence as mother
- Javier Bardem as Him
- Ed Harris as man
- Michelle Pfeiffer as woman
- Brian Gleeson as younger brother
- Domhnall Gleeson as oldest son
- Jovan Adepo as cupbearer
- Patricia Summersett as consoler
- Emily Hampshire as fool
- Luis Oliva as idler
- Chris Gartin as adulterer
- Stephen McHattie as zealot
- Arthur Holden as lingerer
- Kristen Wiig as herald
- Scott Humphrey as abettor
- Marcia Jean Kurtz as thief
- Carolyn Fe as pilferer
- Cristina Rosato as novitiate
- Mizinga Mwinga as deputy
- Amanda Warren as healer
- Laurence Leboeuf as maiden
- Sarah-Jeanne Labrosse as foremother

== Themes ==
In an interview, Lawrence stated that the film is an allegory and "depicts the rape and torment of Mother Earth ... I represent Mother Earth; Javier, whose character is a poet, represents a form of God, a creator; Michelle Pfeiffer is an Eve to Ed Harris's Adam, there's Cain and Abel and the setting sometimes resembles the Garden of Eden."

Aronofsky said the exclamation mark in the title "reflects the spirit of the film", which ends with "a big exclamation point". He discussed the film's unusual choice of not capitalizing the letter 'm' in the title during a Reddit interview, saying: "To find out why there's a lowercase 'm', read the credits and look for the letter that is capitalised. Ask yourself what's another name for this character?" (In the credits, the characters' names are all shown in lowercase, except for Him.)

== Production ==
=== Writing ===
After 2014's Noah, Darren Aronofsky began working on a children's film. During that process, he came up with a new idea. He ended up writing the screenplay for mother! in five days, much faster than his usual pace. The film uses a dream-logic narrative, of which Aronofsky has noted: "if you try to unscrew it, it kind of falls apart ... it's a psychological freak-out. You shouldn't over-explain it."

=== Casting ===
Jennifer Lawrence was reportedly in talks to join the film by October 2015, and, by January 2016, Javier Bardem was also in talks to star. In March, it was announced Kristen Wiig had been cast in the film, and, by April, Domhnall Gleeson, Michelle Pfeiffer, Ed Harris and Brian Gleeson were added to the cast. Lawrence was paid $15 million, Harris $3 million, and Pfeiffer $5 million.

=== Filming ===
On a production budget of $30 million, principal photography began in Montreal, Québec, under the shooting title Day 6 from June to August 2016. The cast first rehearsed for three months in a warehouse, during which time Aronofsky was able to "get a sense of movement and camera movement, and learn from that." Lawrence was reportedly quite relaxed through rehearsals; Aronofsky said that he "didn't get to know the character until we started shooting, and she showed up."

=== Music ===
Mother! is the first of Aronofsky's films without the involvement of composer Clint Mansell. It initially had a score composed by Jóhann Jóhannsson, but after seeing the 90-minute score synced up with a rough cut of the film, Aronofsky and Jóhannsson agreed not to use it. They tried using the score at only a few moments, then a minimal version of the score with sound design by Craig Henighan, incorporating noises into the soundscape of the house. They ultimately decided the film worked best with no music. Composer Ólafur Arnalds recounted the following story about this decision:

... he had spent a year writing the score for Darren Aronofsky's Mother! and at some point realised that the film was better with no music at all. He proceeded to convince Darren to delete everything. It takes a real, selfless artist to do that. To realise the piece is better without you. The most important part of creating art is the process, and Jóhann seemed to understand process. The score needed to be written first in order to realise that it was redundant. So in my view, Mother! still has a score by Jóhann. The score is just silence ... deafening, genius silence.

Over the closing credits, the film features a cover of Skeeter Davis's "The End of the World" performed by Patti Smith.

== Release ==
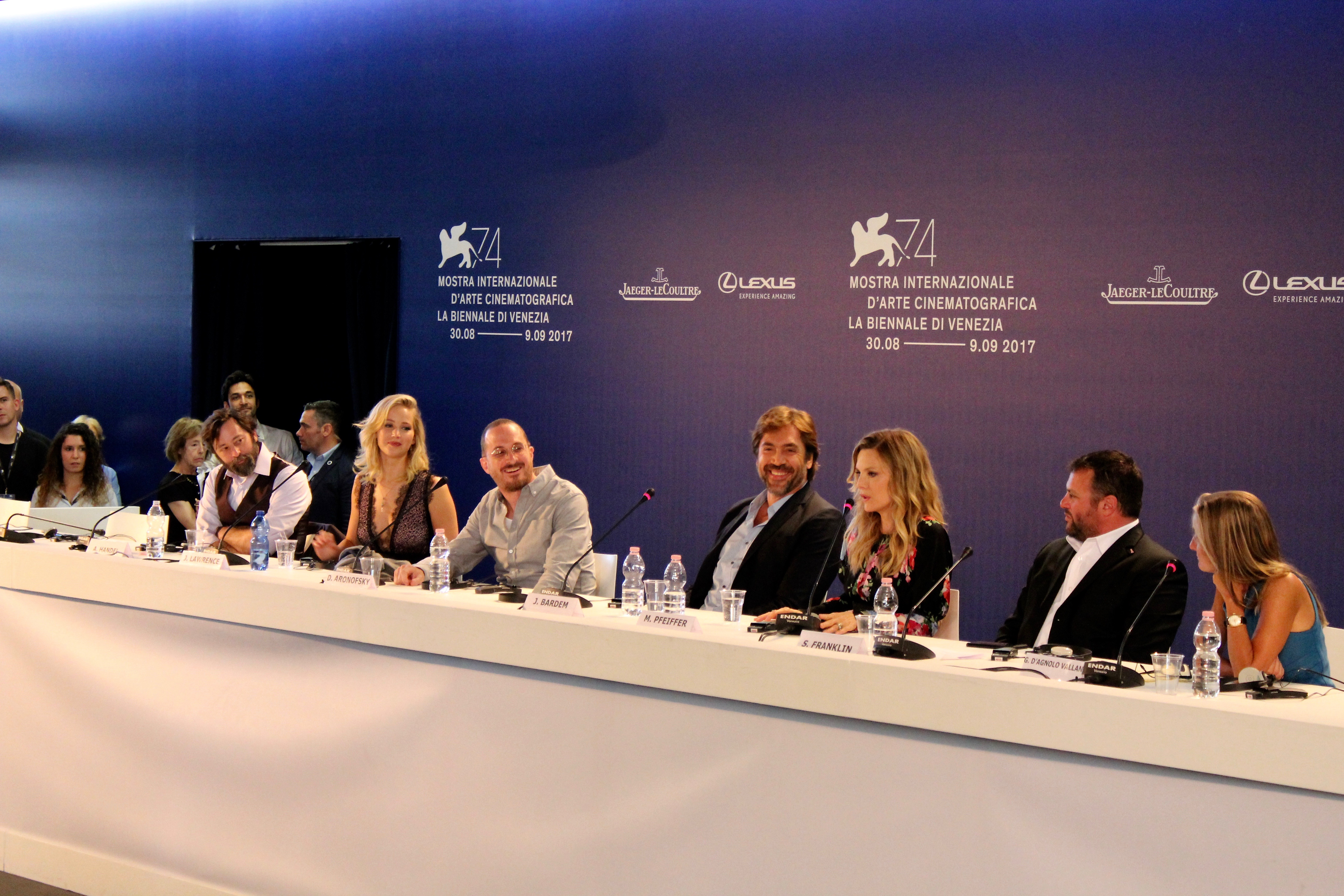
The cast and director Darren Aronofsky attended a press conference during the 2017 Venice Film Festival.

The film was originally scheduled to be released on October 13, 2017, but was moved up to September 15. Its world premiere was at the 74th Venice International Film Festival, where it was selected to compete for the Golden Lion; premiered in London on September 6, 2017; and was screened at the 2017 Toronto International Film Festival.

=== Home media ===
Mother! was released online on December 5, 2017, and on Ultra HD Blu-ray, Blu-ray, and DVD on December 19.

=== Sydney mural controversy ===
In September 2017, street art-based advertising agency Apparition Media painted over a mural in Sydney's Newtown neighborhood with a mural promoting Mother! The original mural, "It's like a jungle sometimes", depicted the streets of Newtown as a jungle with the line referencing Grandmaster Flash and the Furious Five's song "The Message". It was painted in 2005 by artist Colin Bebe, who told ABC that it represented a period of depression and suicidality. Apparition Media painted over it without council permission, replacing it with a giant portrait of Jennifer Lawrence and the caption "#mothermovie". Much community outrage followed and within hours, the new mural had been vandalized by someone who added: "Fuck off! It really is a jungle sometimes. No respect!" Apparition Media apologized and word of the incident also reached Aronofsky, who tweeted that he was "embarrassed and furious" and would pay for the mural's restoration. The original mural was restored in December 2017.

== Reception ==
=== Box office ===
The film grossed $17.8 million in the United States and Canada and $26.7 million in other territories for a worldwide total of $44.5 million.

In North America, the film was released alongside American Assassin and was projected to gross $12–14 million from 2,368 theaters in its opening weekend. It made $700,000 from Thursday night previews, $3.1 million on its first day, and went on to open to just $7.5 million, finishing third at the box office. Deadline Hollywood attributed the film's underperformance to its controversial narrative, misleading advertisements, and "F" CinemaScore grade. As of April 2020, it is one of only 22 films to receive such a rating. Other publications wrote that the film's CinemaScore grade, which is rare, is typically associated with "a movie that goes out of its way to artfully alienate or confuse audiences." In its second weekend, the film dropped 56.3% to $3.3 million, finishing sixth at the box office.

Aronofsky responded to the film's CinemaScore rating by saying that Mother! was meant to be difficult viewing for audiences: "How if you walk out of this movie are you not going to give it an 'F'? ... We wanted to make a punk movie and come at you. And the reason I wanted to come is because I was very sad and I had a lot of anguish and I wanted to express it."

=== Critical response ===
Mother! received generally positive reviews from critics, who praised Aronofsky's direction and the performances, particularly those of Lawrence and Pfeiffer, while its biblical allegories and depiction of violence was scrutinized by some news outlets. The film received both boos and a standing ovation during its premiere at the Venice Film Festival. On the review aggregator website Rotten Tomatoes, 68% of 377 critics' reviews are positive, with an average rating of 7/10. The website's consensus reads: "There's no denying that Mother! is the thought-provoking product of a singularly ambitious artistic vision, though it may be too unwieldy for mainstream tastes." Metacritic, which uses a weighted average, assigned the film a score of 76 out of 100, based on 51 critics, indicating "generally favorable" reviews. However, audiences polled by Cinemascore gave the movie a rare average grade of "F" on an A+ to F scale. PostTrak reported filmgoers gave a 51% overall positive and a 33% "definite recommend".

Peter Travers of Rolling Stone awarded the film three and a half out of four stars, describing it and Aronofsky's direction as an "artist's cry from his own corrupt heart" and "a work of a visionary". He also praised the film's allegorical narrative and the performances of Lawrence, Bardem, and Pfeiffer, and said, positively, that the cinematography "always seems on the verge of exploding". Writing for the Chicago Tribune, Michael Phillips said: "Darren Aronofsky delivers a damning critique of the artist/muse arrangement, even as he admits to its old-fashioned patriarchal simplicity." He also referred to the film and its script as "grandiose and narcissistic and, in quick strokes, pretty vicious," while drawing a similarity to Aronofsky's film Black Swan.

Writing for The Guardian, Peter Bradshaw gave the film five stars, saying: "Darren Aronofsky's toweringly outrageous film leaves no gob unsmacked. It is an event-movie detonation, a phantasmagorical horror and black-comic nightmare that jams the narcosis needle right into your abdomen." Ignatiy Vishnevetsky of The A.V. Club gave the film a B+, writing: "the filmmaking ranks as some of Aronofsky's most skillful". Ben Croll of IndieWire gave the film an A−, noting: "Awash in both religious and contemporary political imagery, Darren Aronofsky's allusive film opens itself to a number of allegorical readings, but it also works as a straight-ahead head rush." In an essay for The Hollywood Reporter, Martin Scorsese said: "It was so tactile, so beautifully staged and acted—the subjective camera and the POV reverse angles, always in motion ... the sound design, which comes at the viewer from around corners and leads you deeper and deeper into the nightmare ... the unfolding of the story, which very gradually becomes more and more upsetting as the film goes forward. The horror, the dark comedy, the biblical elements, the cautionary fable—they're all there, but they're elements in the total experience, which engulfs the characters and the viewers along with them. Only a true, passionate filmmaker could have made this picture, which I'm still experiencing weeks after I saw it." In 2025, Scorsese further remarked on being "amazed" by Lawrence's performance and said: "She really is feeling everything that's happening, in what appears to be a dream of some kind." Director William Friedkin praised the film. Filmmaker Denis Villeneuve cited it as among his favorite films.

In a lukewarm review of the film, Owen Gleiberman of Variety called Mother! "a piece of ersatz humanity", and wrote, "By all means, go to Mother! and enjoy its roller-coaster-of-weird exhibitionism. But be afraid, very afraid, only if you're hoping to see a movie that's as honestly disquieting as it is showy." Rex Reed gave the film zero stars in The New York Observer, and wrote that, though it has some good cinematography, "Nothing about Mother! makes one lick of sense as Darren Aronofsky's corny vision of madness turns more hilarious than scary. With so much crap around to clog the drain, I hesitate to label it the 'Worst movie of the year' when 'Worst movie of the century' fits it even better." Reed further dismissed other critics' positive reviews of the film as "equally pretentious" and "even nuttier than the film itself. ... they all insist Mother! is a metaphor for something, although they are not quite sure what it is." Similarly, The New Republic's Jo Livingstone stated that the film has "no human center to hold it down". Anthony Lane wrote in his review in New Yorker that "My patience was tested beyond repair, I am afraid, by the nimbus of nonsense." In The Wall Street Journal, John Anderson said: "it achieves a level of excess that makes the whole enterprise increasingly cartoonish, rather than just awful." Richard Roeper of the Chicago Sun-Times rated the film two out of four stars, writing that, though he appreciated Lawrence's performance, he questioned whether Aronofsky was mocking certain biblical passages featured in the film or presenting a commentary on an artistic process. Writing for The Washington Post, Anne Hornaday gave the film two stars, saying: "Even Lawrence's magnetic powers can't keep Mother! from going off the rails, which at first occurs cumulatively, then in a mad rush during the film's outlandish climax."

Stephen Whitty of the Newark Star Ledger wrote: "one part early Roman Polanski, one part pseudo Harold Pinter, and two parts apology-from-a-driven-artist. And none of it adds up. The feeble idea behind Mother! isn't strong enough to bear the weight of all the overwrought style he hangs on it. Unlike the mansion it's set in, it's a small, hammered-together thing, and it can't bear all this meaning and metaphor." Chris Nashawaty of Entertainment Weekly said: "Darren Aronofsky's Mother! is Rosemary's Baby amped up into a fugue state of self-indulgent solipsism. He's an artist. And he really wants you to know that he's been thinking a lot about what that means. Unfortunately, his gaze is so deep into his own navel that it's just exasperating." David Edelstein of New York magazine shrugged off the film and any talk of its craft, writing: "Most of the dialogue and effects are clunky, repetitive, second rate."

In July 2025, it was named 461 in the "Readers' Choice" edition of The New York Times' list of "The 100 Best Movies of the 21st Century".

=== Accolades ===
The film's nominations at the 38th Golden Raspberry Awards received backlash from audiences and critics, especially Lawrence's nomination, whose performance was also praised by critics.

Award	Date of ceremony	Category	Recipient(s)	Result	Ref.
Alliance of Women Film Journalists	January 8, 2018	Most Egregious Age Difference Between The Lead and The Love Interest Award	Jennifer Lawrence & Javier Bardem	Nominated	
Alliance of Women Film Journalists	January 8, 2018	Actress Most in Need of a New Agent	Jennifer Lawrence	Nominated	
Alliance of Women Film Journalists	January 8, 2018	AWFJ Hall of Shame Award	Darren Aronofsky	Nominated	
Camerimage	November 18, 2017	Golden Frog	Matthew Libatique	Nominated	
Dorian Awards	February 24, 2018	Supporting Film Performance of the Year – Actress	Michelle Pfeiffer	Nominated	
Dorian Awards	February 24, 2018	Campy Flick of the Year	Mother!	Won	
Empire Awards	March 18, 2018	Best Horror	Mother!	Nominated	
Golden Raspberry Awards	March 3, 2018	Worst Director	Darren Aronofsky	Nominated	
Golden Raspberry Awards	March 3, 2018	Worst Actress	Jennifer Lawrence	Nominated	
Golden Raspberry Awards	March 3, 2018	Worst Supporting Actor	Javier Bardem (also for Pirates of the Caribbean: Dead Men Tell No Tales)	Nominated	
Golden Schmoes Awards	March 4, 2018	Most Underrated Movie of the Year	Mother!	Nominated	
Golden Schmoes Awards	March 4, 2018	Trippiest Movie of the Year	Mother!	Won	
Golden Schmoes Awards	March 4, 2018	Best Horror Movie of the Year	Mother!	Nominated	
Houston Film Critics Society Awards	January 6, 2018	Best Poster Design	Mother!	Nominated	
IndieWire Critics Poll	December 19, 2017	Best Supporting Actress	Michelle Pfeiffer	5th place (Note: Tied with Holly Hunter for The Big Sick.)	
Online Film Critics Society Awards	December 28, 2017	Best Picture	Mother!	Nominated	
Saturn Awards	June 27, 2018	Best Horror Film	Mother!	Nominated	
Venice Film Festival	September 9, 2017	Golden Lion	Mother!	Nominated	
Visual Effects Society Awards	February 13, 2018	Outstanding Supporting Visual Effects in a Photoreal Feature	Dan Schrecker, Colleen Bachman, Ben Snow, Wayne Billheimer & Peter Chesney	Nominated	
