= Mizinga Mwinga =

Zambian actor (born 1980)

- Born: January 3, 1980 (age 46); Lusaka, Zambia
- Occupation: Actor
- Years active: 2010–present
- Notable work: War Witch (2012)

Mizinga Anthony Mwinga (born 3 January is a British/Canadian actor.

== Biography ==
Mizinga, the son of Dave and Carole Mwinga. His father is an airline engineer. He grew up between England and Canada. As a young man Mizinga took his first acting class on his mother's advice, and he immediately loved it. He went on to study theatre and performing arts in London England.

Early in his career Mizinga had several small roles in theater, films, and television. He then landed a role in London's West End production of the play Sweet Charity. In 2012, Mizinga had his first big role in a film, as the rebel leader Grand Tigre Royal in Kim Nguyen's War Witch. The film deals with child soldiers in sub-Saharan Africa, and Mizinga's character believes that Komona (Rachel Mwanza) in a sorceress. In order to play the role, Mizinga had to learn to speak the Lingala language, taking months of practice. As he had to handle automatic weapons, Mizinga and the cast had to be escorted by a military convoy while in the Democratic Republic of the Congo due to unwanted attention from local criminals. War Witch received several awards and was nominated for an Academy Award for Best Foreign Film. In 2013, Mwinga had a small part in White House Down. He then went on to appear in Darren Aronofsky's 2017 film Mother!.

== Filmography ==
=== Television ===
Year	Title	Role	Notes
2010	Blue Mountain State	Denise's Sex Buddy	
2012	The Will	Donto James	
2012–2015	Fatal Vows	Deon Cartmell / Damian	Two roles in two episodes
2014	Helix	Mercenary #1	
2014	The Lottery	Officer Lopez	
2015	Quantico	Suit #1	
2016–2017	Real Detective	Det. John Davis / Sam	Two roles in two episodes
2017	The Exorcist	Doctor	1 episode
2018	Take Two	Jeff	1 episode
2018	A Million Little Things	Larry	1 episode
2019	The Order	Narc	1 episode
2019	iZombie	Security #1	1 episode
2022	The Porter	Eli Foster	5 episodes
2022-2023	Transplant	Tanya’s ex PA Hospital	3 episodes
2026	Memory of a killer	Security Guard #1	1 episode

=== Films ===
Year	Title	Role	Notes
2010	My Policy	Nicholas Karanja	
2011	Making the Band	Maria	
2012	War Witch	Grand Tigre Royal	
2013	Warm Bodies	Guard	Uncredited
2013	White House Down	Blackhawk Pilot #2	Uncredited
2014	Brick Mansions	Cop	
2014	X-Men: Days of Future Past	Potomac River Cop #1	
2015	The Walk	Officer Foley	
2017	Mother!	Deputy	
2017	Crooked Laeves Grew on Trees	Mr. Face	Short film
2017	The Trustee	Principal	
2020	Stolen by My Mother: The Kamiyah Mobley Story	Justin Bamberg	
2024	Witchboard	Cop #1	
2026	Lydia and the Mist Rider	Captain Chadio	Animated film
