= Robert Naylor (actor) =

Canadian actor (born 1996)

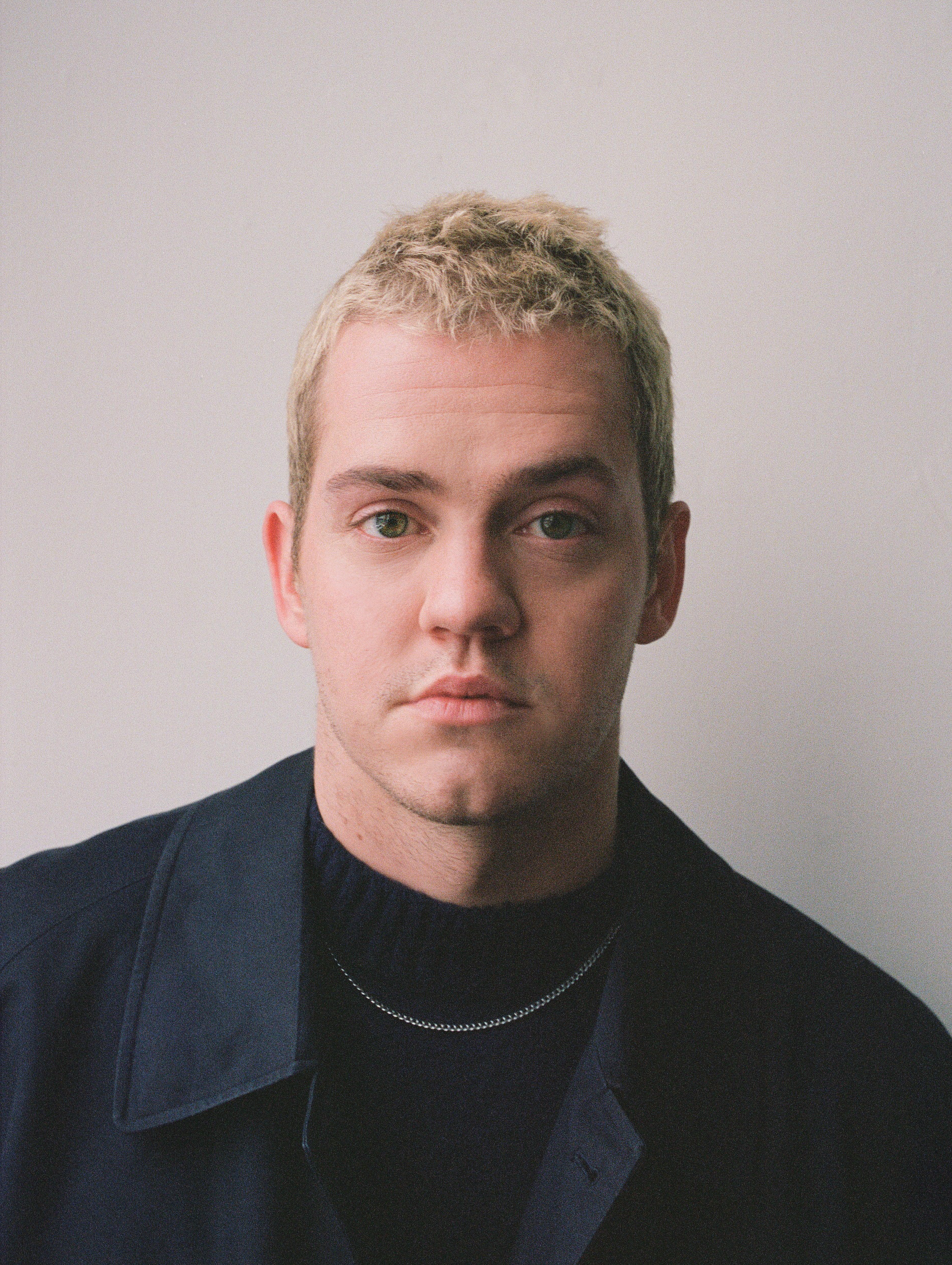
- Naylor in 2024
- Born: July 6, 1996 (age 30); Pointe-Claire, Quebec, Canada
- Other name: Rob Naylor
- Occupations: Actor, musician
- Years active: 2005–present
- Website: www.robertnaylor.ca

Robert Naylor (born July 6, 1996) is a Canadian actor and musician known for his voice-over on the Canadian/American television series Arthur as Dora Winifred "D.W." Read from 2007 to 2012, as well as lead roles in 10 1/2 (2010), 1:54 (2016) and Ghost Town Anthology (2019). He has joined the hit TV series Heated Rivalry (2025-) season 2 as Wyatt Hayes.

== Early life ==
Naylor was born in Pointe-Claire, Quebec, Canada and is fluent in English and French.

== Acting career ==
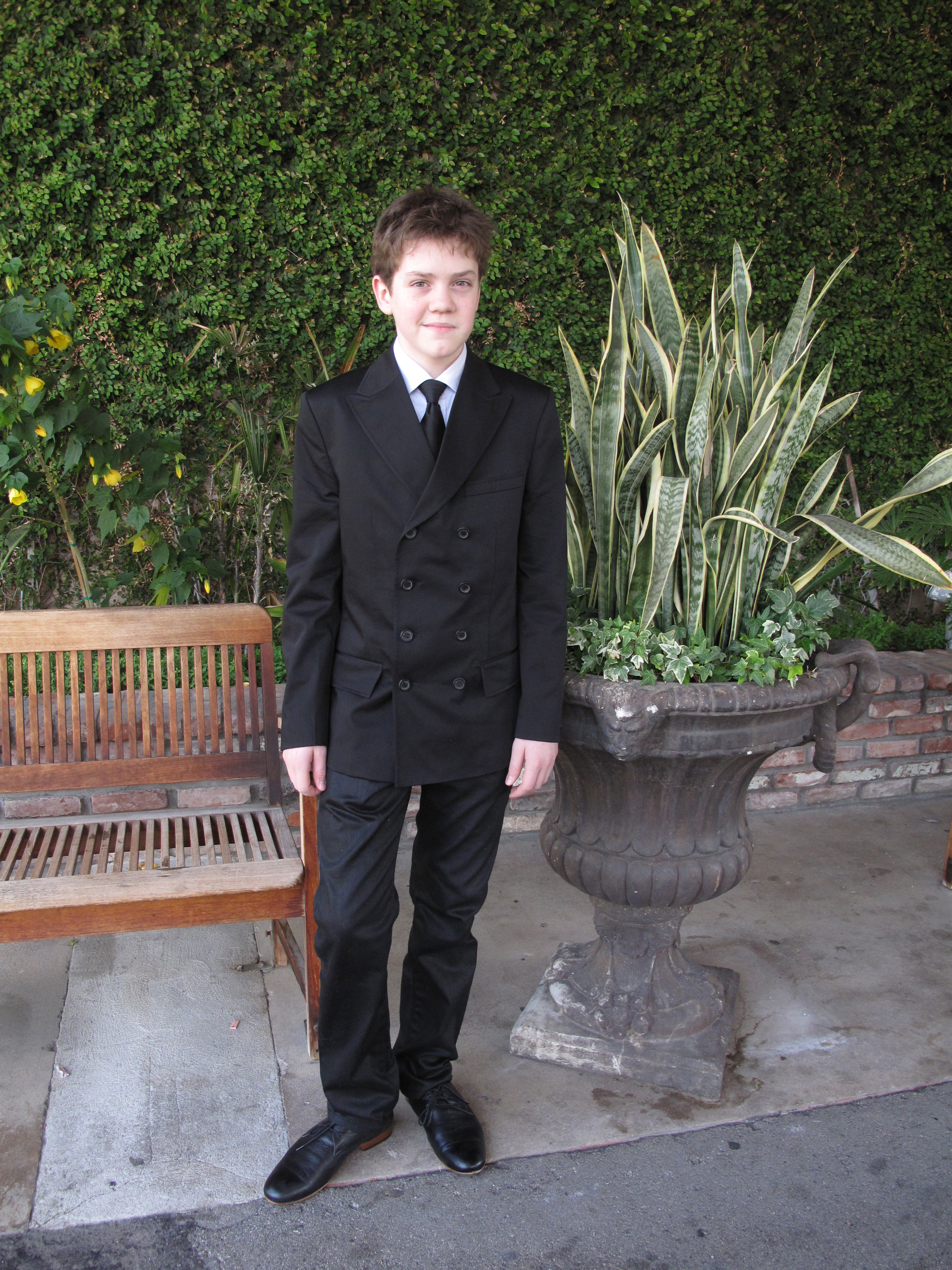
Naylor at the 32nd Young Artist Awards, 2011

Naylor started acting in 2003 when he joined the local children's theatre school Theatre West (formerly Pegasus Performing Arts). He first appeared on TV in an English commercial, a part he got from his first audition. He has had various television movie roles including Adam in Race to Mars, Jamie in Voices, and Young Tanner in Fakers. His first lead role came at the age of 12 in the Quebec feature 10½ starring Claude Legault and directed by Daniel Grou. His role of Tommy in 10½ earned him the Best Actor award at the International Film Festival Bratislava in 2010, a nomination in the 31st Genie Awards for Performance by an Actor in a Leading Role, and a Young Artist Award for Best Performance in an International Feature Film.

In 2010, he worked on U.S.-produced movie Immortals, directed by Tarsem Singh, playing Young Theseus. His first recurring role in a TV series is that of Theo in the Radio-Canada Quebec TV series 19-2, which started in early 2011 on Radio-Canada. Directed by Daniel Grou ("Podz"), the series tells the story of two Montreal cops. Robert plays the role of Théo Berof, the son of the character played by Réal Bossé.

In May 2011, he portrayed Eric Hillridge in the Muse Entertainment-produced TV movie Cyberbully, which was shot in Montreal and premiered on ABC Family on July 17, 2011. Later that summer, he received the role of Stevie Atkins, a ghost, in the second season of Being Human. He then worked on one episode of an IFC scripted TV series, Bullet in the Face, which was produced by Muse Entertainment and Just For Laughs and aired in summer 2012.

== Music career ==
Naylor is also a musician and producer who performs under the name Rob Naylor. His first track "Yes" was released on Gareth Emery's label Garuda in July 2013, followed by another EP later in the year. In 2019 he released another track with trance DJ & producer Ben Gold under the name Rb Naylr.

He composed his first film score in 2018.

== Filmography ==
=== Feature films ===
Year	Title	Role	Notes
2010	10 1/2	Tommy	
2011	Immortals	Young Theseus	
2012	Pinocchio	Pinocchio	Voice; Canadian release
2014	Every Thing Will Be Fine	Christopher	
2016	1:54	Francis	
2017	Sahara	Ajar	Voice
2018	When Love Digs a Hole (Quand l'amour se creuse un trou)	Miron	Actor + Composer
2019	Ghost Town Anthology (Répertoire des villes disparues)	Jimmy	
2019	Entangled	Danny	
2020	The Forgotten Battle	Bill	Post-Production
2021	Maria Chapdelaine	Lorenzo Surprenant	
2021	The Noise of Engines (Le Bruit des moteurs)	Alexandre	
2023	Katak: The Brave Beluga	Katak	English version
2025	Mile End Kicks	Hugo	

=== Television ===
Year	Title	Role	Notes
2006	Circle of Friends	Joan's Son	
2006	Lance et Compte: La revanche	Son of Mark Stevens	
2007	Race to Mars	Adam Erwin	
2007–2008	Postcards from Buster	Dora Winifred "D.W." Read	Voice
2007–2012	Arthur	Dora Winifred "D.W." Read	Voice
2010	Fakers	Young Tanner	
2011–2015	19-2	Theo	
2011	Cyberbully	Eric Hillridge	
2012	Bullet in the Face	Klaus Mollert	
2012–2013	Being Human	Stevie Atkins	
2013	Pipi, Pupu & Rosmary	Pipi	Voice
2014	Helix	The Scythe	
2014	Toute la vérité	Jessy Gravel	
2014	30 vies	Francis Bertrand	
2014	Ascension	Matthew	
2017	Cardinal	Keith	
2017	Bellevue	Jacob Cowan	
2018	District 31	Felix Cloutier	
2020–2021	Clash	Vincent Dumoulin	
2023	Indéfendable	Alex Levac	
2024	Respira (Breathless)	Biel	Voice
2027	Heated Rivalry †	Wyatt Hayes	Season 2

=== Short films ===
Year	Title	Role	Notes
2007	The Schoolyard (Les Grands)	Tommy	
2008	My Name Is Victor Gazon (Mon nom est Victor Gazon)	Narrator	
2009	Alex and the Ghosts	Alex (Voice)	
2011	Alone With Mr Carter	John	
2012	The Horse Latitudes	Philly	

=== Documentary ===
Year	Title	Role	Notes
2011	Dictature affective		

== Discography ==
=== Singles ===
As Rob Naylor

- 2013 Yes (Garuda)
- 2013 Head North / Forever City (Garuda)

As Rb Naylr

- 2019 Why You EL? (With Ben Gold) (Armada Music)

=== Remixes ===
- 2014 Solis & Sean Truby - Raccoon (Rob Naylor Remix) (Infrasonic Recordings)
- 2015 Greg Wonders, Arnaud S & Sarah Shields - Out Of This World (Rob Naylor Remix) (Nueva Recordings)

== Awards ==
Year	Award	Category	Film	Result	Ref
2010	International Film Festival Bratislava	Best Actor	10 1/2	Won	
2011	Genie Award	Actor in a Leading Role	10 1/2	Nominated	
2011	Young Artist Awards	Best Performance by an Actor in an International Feature Film	10 1/2	Won	
2012	Young Artist Awards	Best Performance in a TV Movie, Miniseries or Special – Supporting Young Actor	Cyberbully	Nominated	
2013	Young Artist Awards	Best Performance in a TV Series - Young Recurring Actor	Being Human	Nominated	
2022	Prix Iris	Best Actor	The Noise of Engines (Le bruit des moteurs)	Nominated	
