= Guy Nadon =

French-Canadian actor

Guy Nadon CM
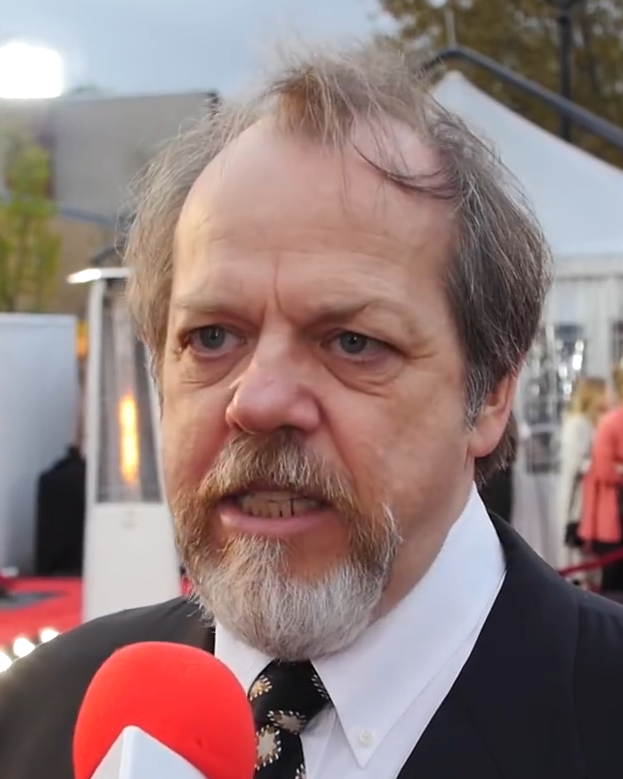
- Guy Nadon in 2017
- Born: August 28, 1952 (age 74); Montreal, Quebec, Canada
- Education: National Theatre School of Canada
- Occupations: Actor, Voice actor, Acting coach
- Known for: O', Aveux, Série noire, H_{2}O
- Children: Arnaud Gascon-Nadon
- Awards: Prix Gémeaux, Artis Award

Guy Nadon CM (born August 28, 1952 in Montreal, Quebec) is a French-Canadian actor and voice-over actor. Though his most notable English-language role was arguably in H_{2}O, his other works have been in his first language of French. In 2010, he was appointed a Member of the Order of Canada.

== Film ==
Year	Title	Role	Additional notes
1966	Rue des Pignons	Simon Durieu	
1976	The Flower Between the Teeth (La fleur aux dents)	Radio technician	
1984	Transformers	Ironhide	(Québécois voice); TV
1987	Laurier		
1994	Craque la vie!	Robert Gignac	
1994	Windigo	Jean Fontaine	
1996	Urgence	Jacques Therrien	
1997	Paparazzi	Jean-Paul Dumont	
1998	Streetheart (Le Cœur au poing)	Julien	
2000	Chartrand et Simonne	Gérard Picard	
2004	H_{2}O	Marc Lavigne	
2009	Aveux	Charles Laplante	
2010	The Comeback (Cabotins)	Gros Marco Malo	
2011	Assassin's Creed: Revelations	Manuel Palaiologos	French voice
2012	Assassin's Creed III	Robert Faulkner	French voice
2012	The Pee-Wee 3D: The Winter That Changed My Life (Les Pee-Wee 3D)		
2014	Guardian Angel (L'Ange gardien)	Normand	
2019	Thanks for Everything (Merci pour tout)		
2020	La Maison-Bleue	Jacques Hamelin	Series lead
2021	Crisis	Mother	
2021	Felix and the Treasure of Morgäa (Félix et le trésor de Morgäa)	Tom	French version
2023	One Summer (Le temps d'un été)	Jean-Pierre Genin	
2023	We Are Zombies	Bob Coleman	
2024	The Sticky	Léonard Gauthier	
2026	Lydia and the Mist Rider (Lydia et le vaisseau des tempêtes)	Kidjano	Voice role, French version
