= Daniel Brochu =

Canadian actor (born 1970)

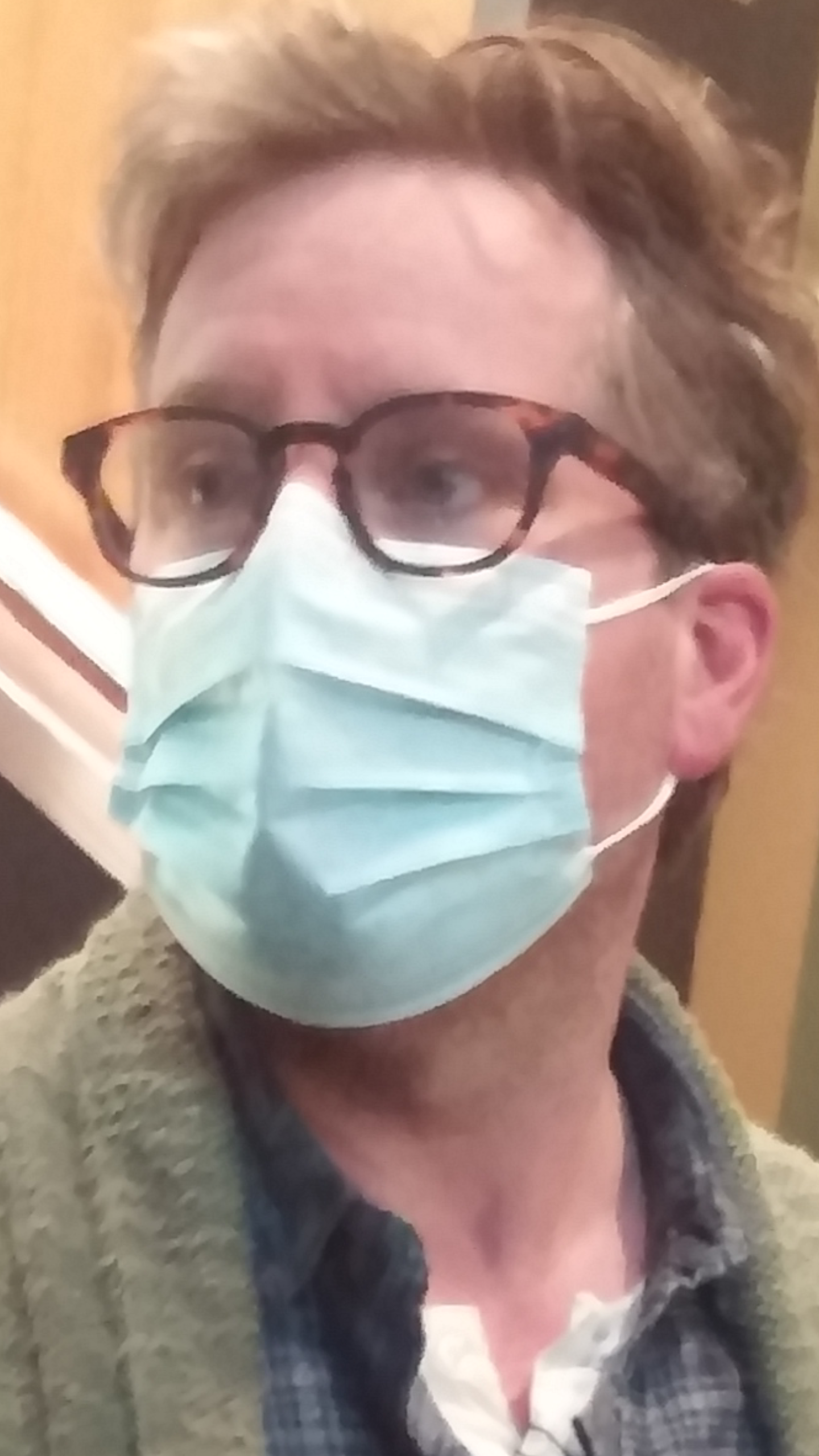
- Brochu at the Segal Centre for Performing Arts in 2021
- Born: 1970 (age 55–56); Montreal, Quebec, Canada
- Other names: Danny Brochu; Conway Bruce
- Occupation: Actor
- Years active: 1990–present
- Spouse: Sara Bradeen (m. 2005)
- Children: 2

Daniel Brochu (born 1970) is a Canadian actor.

== Early life ==
Brochu came from a single-parent family and has asthma, both of which he has in common with his character Buster Baxter on Arthur. He had worked as a postal carrier prior to becoming an actor. Brochu got into acting after one of his teacher’s wives, who had done dubbing, inspired him to become an actor. He credits Mel Blanc and his mentor Tim Reid for inspiration.

== Career ==
Brochu is best known for voicing Buster Baxter in the PBS TV series Arthur and its spin-off Postcards from Buster, as well as Danny Pickett in later seasons of What's with Andy?.

== Personal life ==
On July 2, 2005, Brochu married Sara Bradeen. Together they have two sons.

== Filmography ==
=== Film ===
- The Legend of the North Wind (1992) - Watuna (voice, English dub)
- The Return of the North Wind (1993) - Watuna (voice)
- Rainbow (1995) - Tiger Leader
- The Drive (1996) - Jim
- The Kid (1997) - Trey
- Provocateur (1997) - Kurt Spears
- Sublet (1998) - The Janitor, The Source
- The Bone Collector (1999) - N.Y.U. Student
- Arthur's Perfect Christmas (2000) - Buster Baxter (voice)
- The Sign of Four (2001) - Wiggins
- Pain Relief (2001) -
- The Royal Scandal (2001) - Wiggins
- Dead Awake (2001) - Pit Bull Owner
- Arthur: It's Only Rock 'N Roll (2002) - Buster Baxter (voice)
- Redeemer (2002) - Joey
- The Book of Eve (2002) - Denis Plante
- The Favourite Game (2003) - Krantz
- See Jane Date (2003) - Rick
- See This Movie (2004) - Festival HQ Staffer
- Arthur's Missing Pal (2006) (credited as “Conway Bruce”) - Buster Baxter (voice)
- Tripping the Rift: The Movie (2008) -
- Out of Control (2009) - Danny
- The True History of Puss 'N Boots (2009) - Peter (voice, English dub)
- Mr. Nobody (2009) - Peter
- Ring of Deceit (2009) - Head Usher
- Do No Harm (2012) - Detective Gennaro
- Edmond Was a Donkey (2012) - Edmond's Second Colleague (voice)
- Exploding Sun (2013) - Ivan Zhukov
- The Fantastic Bus (2013) - Dan
- Beauty (2014) -
- Goldfish (2015) - Kyle
- Sahara (2017) - Pitt (voice, English dub)
- Arthur: D.W. and the Beastly Birthday (2017) - Buster Baxter (voice)
- Arthur and the Haunted Tree House (2017) - Buster Baxter (voice)
- Sleeper (2018) - Doctor
- On the Basis of Sex (2018) - Young Professor
- Appiness (2018) - Chet
- The Rhythm and Roots of Arthur (2020) - Buster Baxter (voice)
- An Arthur Thanksgiving (2020) - Buster Baxter (voice)
- Arthur's First Day (2021) - Buster Baxter (voice)
- Felix and the Treasure of Morgäa (Félix et le trésor de Morgäa) (2021) - Felix (English version)
- Pets on a Train (2025) - Randy (voice)

=== Television ===
- The Little Flying Bears (1990) - David, Additional voices
- Gulliver's Travels (1992) - Rafael (voice)
- The Little Lulu Show (1995-1999)- Additional Voices
- Sirens (1995) - Jason
- The Magical Adventures of Quasimodo (1996) - Quasimodo (voice)
- Arthur (1996–2022) (credited as "Danny Brochu" in earlier seasons) - Buster Baxter (voice)
- Les exploits d'Arsène Lupin (1996) - Max Leblanc
- Are You Afraid of the Dark? (1996) - Joshua
- The Hunger (1997–2000) - Kyle, Harry
- The Country Mouse and the City Mouse Adventures (1998) - Bongo (voice)
- Kit & Kaboodle (1998) - Additional Voices
- Rotten Ralph (1999) - Cousin Percy (voice)
- Mumble Bumble (1999) - Roc (voice)
- Mona the Vampire (1999-2002) - Additional Voices
- Tommy & Oscar (1999) - Additional Voices
- Mega Babies (1999-2000) - Additional Voices
- Sagwa, the Chinese Siamese Cat (2001-2002) - Cha-Siu Miao (voice)
- Caillou (2000-2003) (credited as "Danny Brochu") - Caillette Singer (voice)
- Daft Planet (2002) - Additional Voices
- Simon in the Land of Chalk Drawings (2002) - Additional Voices
- Wunschpunsch (2001) - Additional Voices
- Spaced Out (2002) - Benjamin Martin (voice)
- Sacred Ground (2002) - Jimmy
- Kid Paddle (2003) - Big Bang (voice)
- Ratz (2003-2004) - Ragamuffin (voice) and Additional Voices
- What's with Andy? (2003–2007) - Danny Pickett (voice)
- Cosmic Cowboys (2004) - Additional Voices
- Naked Josh (2004) - Pretentious Video Artist
- Winx Club (2004–2009) (credited as "Danny Brochu") - Sky (voice)
- Postcards from Buster (2004–2012) - Buster Baxter (voice)
- The Tofus (2004–2005) - Additional voices
- Shaolin Wuzang (2005) - Cheng
- Franny's Feet (2005–2010) - Additional Voices
- Monster Allergy (2006–2008) - Teddy Thaur
- SamSam (2007–2013) - SamDaddy (voice)
- My Life Me (2010) - Additional voice
- Blue Mountain State (2010) - Aaron Lavey
- Supernatural: The Animation (2011) - Ryan, Michael McGregor (voices)
- Being Human (2012) - Tommy
- 19-2 (2014) - Dispatcher, Operator, Clerk (voices)
- 14 Tagebücher des Ersten Weltkriegs (2014) - Ernst Jünger (voice)
- Hot Mom (2014) - Richard Birch
- Mohawk Girls (2014) - White Party Guest
- H_{2}O: Mermaid Adventures (2015) - Lewis (voice)
- Spookley and the Christmas Kittens (2019) - Mistletoe (voice)
- Tom Sawyer (2020) - Tom Sawyer

=== Video games ===
- Evolution Worlds (2002) - Yurka Shadenaught, Carcano's Followers #1
- TMNT (2007) - Additional voices
- Assassin's Creed III: The Tyranny of King Washington (2013) - Additional voices
- Thief - Watchman
- Outlast: Whistleblower (2014) - Dennis, Scientists, Guards
- Watch Dogs (2014) - Additional voices
- Afterlife VR (2019) - Thom
- The Outlast Trials (2024) - Franco Barbi
