= Kid Paddle =

Belgian gag-a-day comic series

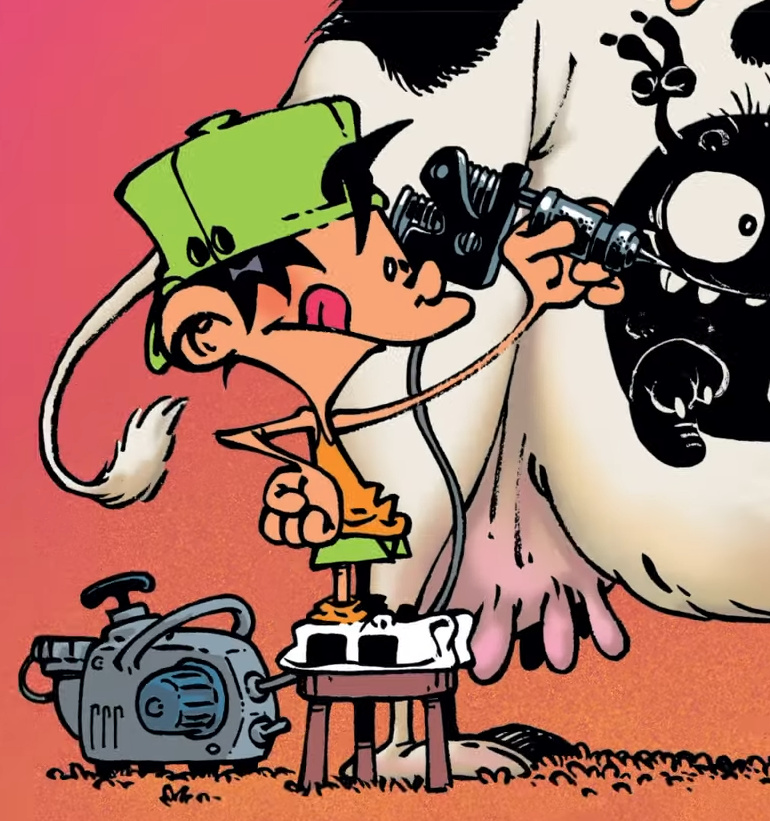
- Title character Kid Paddle

Publication information
- Publisher: Dupuis (1996-2009, 2019-present); MAD Fabrik (since 2010); Glénat (2014-2019)
- Publication date: 1993
- Main character(s): Kid Paddle; Big Bang; Horace Beket; Mirador

Creative team
- Written by: Midam
- Colorist: Angèle

Kid Paddle is a Belgian gag-a-day comic series created by Michel Ledent (Midam) in 1993. It was first published in the Franco-Belgian comics magazine Spirou before branching out into its own volume of comic albums in 1996.

The series inspired an animated television series produced by the now-defunct animation studio Spectra Animation. The series premiered on September 2, 2003, and was aired on M6 and Canal J in France, RTBF Television in Belgium, and on Teletoon in Canada.

== Overview ==
The series delves into the interests and hobbies of children aged 8 to 12 years old. The central character, known as Kid Paddle, is portrayed as a young boy with a strong affinity for video games, comic books, a fictional alien species known as Blorks, and sci-fi television. Kid Paddle's closest companions include Big Bang and Horace. Big Bang is depicted as a child scientist who enjoys inventing various gadgets for Kid Paddle to experiment with and is characterized by his high intelligence. In contrast, Horace, another member of Kid Paddle's friendship circle, is portrayed as more innocent and possesses an unusual appetite. He admires Kid Paddle and offers his support. Kid Paddle frequently engages in disagreements with his sister, Carol, who views her brother as somewhat of an eccentric and absent-minded individual.

== Comics ==
The series has been released as 20 comic albums. The first 11 albums were published by Dupuis, from volume 12 the albums were published by Mad Fabrik, Midam's own publishing company.

1. Jeux de Vilains (Villain Games),1996
2. Carnage Total (Total Carnage), 1996
3. Apocalypse Boy, 1997
4. Full Metal Casquette (Full Metal Cap), (1998)
5. Alien Chantilly, 1999
6. Rodéo Blork (Blork Rodeo), 2000
7. Waterminator, 2001
8. Paddle... My Name Is Kid Paddle, 2002
9. Boing! Boing! Bunk!, 2005
10. Dark, j'adore! (I Love the Dark!), 2005
11. Le Retour de la Momie Qui Pue Qui Tue (The Return of the Mummy Who Stinks, Who Kills), 2007
12. Panik Room, 2011
13. Slime Project, 2012
14. Serial Player, 2014
15. Men in Blork, 2017
16. Kid N' Roses, 2020
17. Tatoo Compris, 2021
18. Silence of the Lamps, 2022
19. Love, Death and Roblorks, 2023
20. Blork Chef, 2024
21. Zombie or not to be, 2025

== Video games ==
Kid Paddle has been the subject of three video game releases available on various Nintendo platforms in Belgium and France. The initial installment, titled "Kid Paddle," was developed for the Game Boy Advance and released in 2005.

Subsequently, "Kid Paddle: Blorks Invasion" became available for the Nintendo DS in 2007. The franchise expanded its presence with the release of "Kid Paddle: Lost in the Game," a title accessible on both the Wii and DS platforms, in 2008. Additionally, "Kid Paddle: Puzzle Monsters" is a video game designed for iPad and iPhone platforms. Published by Anuman Interactive in 2009, the game extends the franchise's presence into the realm of mobile gaming.

== See also ==
• Belgian comics

• Franco-Belgian comics
