= Felix and the Treasure of Morgäa =

2021 Canadian animated film by Nicola Lemay

- Film poster.
- French: Félix et le trésor de Morgäa
- Directed by: Nicola Lemay
- Written by: Marc Robitaille; Nicola Lemay; Arthur Holden
- Story by: Nicola Lemay
- Produced by: Nancy Florence Savard
- Starring: Karine Vanasse; Gabriel Lessard; Guy Nadon; Daniel Brochu; Vlasta Vrána
- Edited by: René Caron
- Music by: Gilles Leveillé
- Production companies: 10th Ave. Productions; Maison 4:3
- Distributed by: Attraction Distribution
- Release date: February 26, 2021 (FIFEM)
- Running time: 90 minutes
- Country: Canada
- Languages: English; French

Felix and the Treasure of Morgäa (French: Félix et le trésor de Morgäa) is a Canadian animated adventure family film, directed by Nicola Lemay and released in 2021. The film centres on Felix, a 12-year-old boy who has been living with his mother on the Magdalen Islands since his father's failure to return from a voyage to find treasure on the Island of Eternal Night; when his mother goes off on vacation and leaves him and his infant sister, Mia, in the care of their aunt, he enlists the help of lighthouse keeper Tom to travel to the island in search of his father.

The film's French voice cast includes Karine Vanasse, Gabriel Lessard, Guy Nadon, Marc Labrèche, Catherine Proulx-Lemay, Éveline Gélinas, Louis Lacombe-Petrowski, Antoine Durand, Tristan Harvey, Kim Jalabert, Geneviève Bédard, Frédéric Desager, Jean-François Beaupré and Jérôme Boiteau, while its English voice cast includes Vanasse, Boiteau, Daniel Brochu, Vlasta Vrána, Holly Gauthier-Frankel, Angela Galuppo, Wyatt Bowen, Terrence Scammell, Richard M. Dumont, Arthur Holden, Marcel Jeannin, Mark Camacho, Elizabeth Neale and Eleanor Noble.

Lemay originally conceived the project as a graphic novel, before instead pitching it to 10th Ave. Productions as an animated film. The film premiered on February 26, 2021 as the opening film of the Montreal International Children's Film Festival, before being released commercially in both English and French. In advance of the film's release, children's author Édith Bourget published a novelization of the film.

The film received a Prix Iris nominations at the 23rd Quebec Cinema Awards in 2021 for Best First Film.
