= Midam =

Belgian comics author (born 1963)

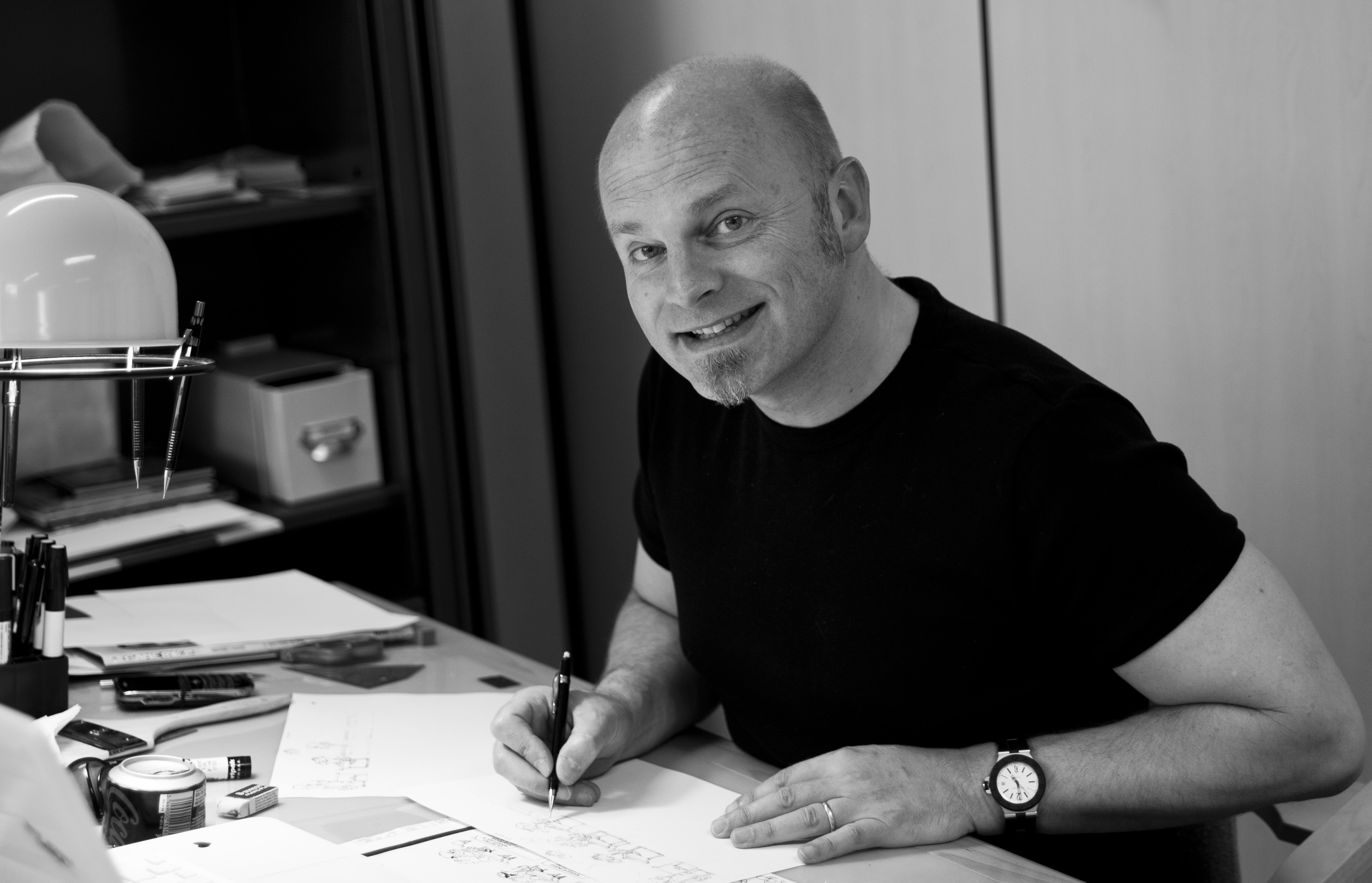
- Born: Michel Ledent; 16 May 1963 (age 63) Etterbeek, Brussels-Capital Region, Belgium
- Areas: artist, writer
- Notable works: Kid Paddle
- Awards: see awards section

Michel Ledent (born 16 May 1963), known by the pseudonym Midam, is a Belgian comics author, best known for Kid Paddle.

== Biography ==
Michel Ledent was born in Etterbeek near Brussels in 1963. He studied illustration and interior decoration at the Institut Saint-Luc in Brussels, and started creating comics in 1989 for the computer magazine Micro-Systèmes. Under the pseudonym Midam, he joined Spirou magazine in 1992 as an illustrator for the videogames section.

The character he created there, Kid Paddle, soon got its own series, which became very popular, with over 4 million copies sold in French. New albums sell some 400,000 copies in French alone, making it one of the top ten best-selling French language comics series. In 2002, a separate Kid Paddle magazine was launched, and an animated TV series was created as well, with so far 104 episodes. The spin-off series Game Over was created in 2004, presenting the misadventures of the main character of the video games Kid Paddle is fond of playing in his own albums. The comic is wordless and is according to Midam inspired by the everfailing quests of Wile E. Coyote. The first album sold 60,000 copies.

Other series by Midam were Le Gowap, which was continued by Curd Ridel, and Durant les Travaux, l'Exposition Continue with Clarke.

== Bibliography ==
- Kid Paddle: Dupuis, 1996–2007, Mad Fabrik, 2011-present, 15 volumes
- Durant les Travaux, l'Exposition Continue: Dupuis, 1998 - 2000, with Clarke, 3 volumes
- Game Over: Dupuis, 2004–2009, Mad Fabrik, 2009-present, 17 volumes, with Adam and others
- Le Miracle de la vie: Dupuis, 2004, artwork by Clarke, 1 volume
- Harding was Here: Quadrants, 2008, with Adam, 1 volume

== Awards ==
- 2002: Nominated for the Youth Prize at the Angoulême International Comics Festival for Kid Paddle
- 2005: Youth Prize at the Prix Saint-Michel for Game Over
- 2006: Prix Canal J for the best youth comic for Kid Paddle

Nominated for the Youth Prize at the Angoulême International Comics Festival for Kid Paddle
Nominated for the Youth Prize at the Prix Saint-Michel for Kid Paddle

- 2009: Nominated for the Prix Canal J for Kid Paddle
