= Arthur Holden =

Canadian actor and writer (born 1959)

- Born: August 28, 1959 (age 67); Montreal, Quebec, Canada
- Occupations: Actor, writer
- Years active: 1980–present
- Spouse: Claire Holden Rothman
- Father: Richard Holden

Arthur Holden (born August 28, 1959) is a Canadian actor and writer. Known for his roles such as Mr. Ratburn in Arthur, Baba-Miao in Sagwa, the Chinese Siamese Cat, Mayor Mallard in The Little Twins, and Mr. Larkin in later episodes of What's with Andy?, he has also had roles in film, television and theatre, and has written for stage, film and television. Ars Poetica is a play that Holden wrote.

Holden has also done voices for many video games such as Tom Clancy's Rainbow Six: Vegas, Far Cry Instincts, Hype: The Time Quest, Prince of Persia: Warrior Within, and Deus Ex: Human Revolution.

== Early life ==
Holden's father was politician Richard Holden (1931–2005). His mother, Hélène Papachristidis Holden, is a Montreal novelist and recipient of the Order of Canada.

== Career ==
Holden appears in movies such as The Bone Collector, The Sum of All Fears, Million Dollar Babies, The Hound of the Baskervilles, When Justice Fails, The Greatest Game Ever Played and The Aviator. He voiced the characters of David Miller in the 2005 computer game Still Life and Sibrand in the 2007 game Assassin's Creed. He also appeared on Are You Afraid of the Dark? in its third-season episode, "The Tale of the Midnight Ride" as Ichabod Crane's Ghost. His other appearance in that series was Mr. Brooks the science teacher in fifth-season episode "The Tale of the Dead Man's Float" and as the Court Jester in sixth-season episode "The Tale of the Wisdom Glass".

He also guest-starred in TV shows including Soldier of Fortune, Inc., The Hunger and The Business.

== Personal life ==
Holden currently lives in Montreal with his wife Claire Holden Rothman.

== Filmography ==
=== Film ===
- Remembering Mel (1984) –
- Wild Thing (1987) – Manager of Gat Bar
- The Treasure of Swamp Castle (1988) – Captain
- God Bless the Child (1988) –
- Day One (1989) – Scientist (uncredited)
- The Scorpo Factor (1989) – Hugo
- Fatman and Little Boy (1989) – Oakridge Doctor
- Money (1991) – 4th Broker
- La sarrasine (1992) – Le secrétaire
- The Postmistress (1992) – Interprete
- David Copperfield (1993) – Duke Wickfield
- Mrs. Parker and the Vicious Circle (1994) – Ward
- La vie d'un héros (1994) – Chauffeur d'Hanibal
- Hiroshima (1995) – Map Room Officer
- Hawk's Vengeance (1996) – Dr. Sattler
- How the Toys Saved Christmas (1996) – Train driver (voice, English dub)
- In the Presence of Mine Enemies (1997) – David
- The Minion (1998) – Forensics Officer
- Twist of Fate (1998) – Attorney
- When Justice Fails (1999) – Coroner's Man
- Quand je serai parti... vous vivrez encore (1999) – Greffier
- The Patty Duke Show: Still Rockin' in Brooklyn Heights (1999) – Sam
- Bonanno: A Godfather's Story (1999) – Simon
- The Bone Collector (1999) – Bookstore Clerk
- Isn't She Great (2000) – Bookstore Clerk (uncredited)
- Where the Money Is (2000) – Bob
- Heavy Metal 2000 (2000) – Dr. Schechter (voice)
- Two Thousand and None (2000) – Phillip Carlilo
- Lion of Oz (2000) – Additional voices
- The Hound of the Baskervilles (2000) – Mr. John Barrymore
- Canada: A People's History (2000) – William Cormack
- Arthur's Perfect Christmas (2000) – Nigel Ratburn (voice)
- The Warden (2001) – Karaoke Man
- The Killing Yard (2001) – Dr. John Edland
- The Royal Scandal (2001) – Sigismund
- Abandon (2002) – Frank Peabody
- The Struggle (2002) – Adolf Eichmann
- The Sum of All Fears (2002) – Dressler's Associate
- Gleason (2002) – Maitre D'
- Is the Crown at War with Us? (2002) – Narrator
- Rudy: The Rudy Giuliani Story (2003) – Reporter #1
- Bad Apple (2004) – Home Depot Clerk
- Noel (2004) – Piano Player
- Eternal (2004) –
- Head in the Clouds (2004) – Arnold Beck
- Arthur's Halloween (2004) – Nigel Ratburn (voice)
- The Aviator (2004) – Radio Announcer
- Slow Burn (2005) – Felix Lang
- The Greatest Game Ever Played (2005) – Club Secretary
- 300 (2006) – Partisan
- Blind Trust (2007) – Mr. Orick
- The Great War (2007) – Col. John McCrae
- I'm Not There (2007) – Townsfolk #2
- Dr. Jekyll and Mr. Hyde (2008) – Fowler
- Moomin and Midsummer Madness (2008) – Snufkin (voice, English dub)
- The True History of Puss 'N Boots (2009) – The Chamberlain (voice, English dub)
- Desiderata (2009) – Pharmacist
- Whiteout (2009) – McGuire
- Barney's Version (2010) – Notary
- Moomins and the Comet Chase (2010) – Snork (voice, English dub)
- Everywhere (2010) – Man #2
- Trader Games (2010) – Fox
- File Under Miscellaneous (2010) – Doctor
- Assassin's Creed: Ascendance (2010) – Octavien de Valois (voice)
- Mirror Mirror (2012) – Noble #1
- Kaspar (2012) – Background Voice (voice)
- On the Road (2012) – Maitre D
- Pinocchio (2012) – Policeman #1, The Owl, Town Crier (voice English dub)
- Attack of the Brainsucker (2012) – Dr. Leonard
- Sorry, Rabbi (2012) – Rabbi
- The Girl in the Rubber Mask (2012) – The Man
- Kaspar (2012) – Background voices
- Warm Bodies (2013) – Zombie Patient
- Hold My Breath (2013) – Taxi Man
- Rouge Sang (2013) – Le Blessé
- Nicky Deuce (2013) – Driver
- The Storm Within (2013)
- Rhymes for Young Ghouls (2013) – Priest #1
- JFK: The Smoking Gun (2013) – Dr. John Ebersole
- Meetings with a Young Poet (2014) – Jerome
- X-Men: Days of Future Past (2014) – Blue Suit Traveler
- An Eye for Beauty (2014) – Professeur de Vancouver
- Pawn Sacrifice (2014) – Party Guest #3
- Holder's Comma (2014) – Man
- The Forbidden Room (2015) – Auctioneer
- Stonewall (2015) – Frank Kameny
- Northpole: Open for Christmas (2015) – Blizzby
- Race (2016) – Rudolf Dassler, Announcer
- Meat (2016) – Doctor
- Quantico (2016) – Doctor
- Final Destiny (2016) – FBI Agent
- Bad Santa 2 (2016) – Buttslap Santa
- Hidden (2016) – Truiit
- Sahara (2017) – Sergeant, Maurice (voices, English dub)
- Mother! (2017) – Lingerer
- A Yeti Adventure (2017) – Edward Martineau (voice, English dub)
- Arthur and the Haunted Tree House (2017) – Nigel Ratburn (voice)
- Another Kind of Wedding (2017) – John
- D.W. and the Beastly Birthday (2017) – Nigel Ratburn (voice)
- Lemonade (2018) – Doctor
- On the Basis of Sex (2018) – Dr. Leadbetter
- Long Shot (2019) – Royal Crier
- Moment (2019) – Douglas
- My Salinger Year (2020) – Dean
- Within These Walls (2020) – Pest controller
- Felix and the Treasure of Morgäa (Félix et le trésor de Morgäa) – 2021: Klaus
- Blind Willow, Sleeping Woman (2023) – Mr. Suzuki (voice)
- Beau Is Afraid (2023) – Theatre Troupe Member
- Katak: The Brave Beluga (2023) – Cyrano
- Les As de la jungle 2: Opération tour du monde (2023) – Al
- Lydia and the Mist Rider (2026) - Kidjano

=== Television ===
- The Littl' Bits (1980) – Snagglebit (voice)
- Maya the Bee (1980) – Alexander
- Samurai Pizza Cats (1990) – Various characters (voice)
- The Little Flying Bears (1990) – Walt (voice)
- Saban's Adventures of the Little Mermaid (1991) – Ridley (voice)
- A Bunch of Munsch (1992) – Additional voices
- The Adventures of Grady Greenspace (1992–1993) – Musical Rat #3 (voice)
- Sirens (1994) – Priest
- Mighty Machines (1994–2008) – Various characters (voice)
- Million Dollar Babies (1994) – Poppa Dionne
- Are You Afraid of the Dark? (1994-1995; 1999) – Court Jester, Mr. Brooks, Ichabod Crane
- Les aventures de la courte échelle (1996) – Mr Smith
- Arthur (1996–2022) – Nigel Ratburn, Bionic Bunny (voices)
- Jungle Show (1997) – Ronny the Rhino, Kenny the Jaguar, Elvis the Elephant (voices)
- The Country Mouse and the City Mouse Adventures (1997–1998) – Additional voices
- Carrot Top (1997) - Raoul
- The Hunger (1997–1999) – Robertson, Motel Bellman
- The Mystery Files of Shelby Woo (1998) – David Vandermeer
- Soldier of Fortune, Inc. (1998) – Dr. Randolph Fredricks, Uniformed Inspector
- The Animal Train (1998) – Dad (voice)
- Bouscotte (1998) – Comptable
- Mona the Vampire (1999) – Murray Karpowitz (voice)
- Tommy and Oscar (1999) – Additional voices
- War of 1812 (1999) – Tiger Dunlop
- Misguided Angels (1999) – Sneezing Angel
- Rotten Ralph (1999–2001) – Additional voices
- A Miss Mallard Mystery (2000) – Additional voices
- Jim Knopf (2000–2001) – Additional voices
- Sagwa, the Chinese Siamese Cat (2001–2002) – Baba Wim Bao Miao, Baba Miao (voices)
- X-DuckX (2001–2005) – Additional voices
- Seriously Weird (2002) – Rajkowski
- The Last Chapter (2002) – Prosecutor
- Daft Planet (2002) – Frederick Stiles (voice)
- Mystery Ink (2003) – True Crimes Performer
- Kid Paddle (2003) – Mr. Paddle (voice)
- Ratz (2003–2004) – Benny (voice)
- Mental Block (2003–2004) – Mr. Haddock
- What's with Andy? (2003–2007) – Dad (voice)
- Fortier (2004) – Toutoune Rochon
- Postcards from Buster (2004) – Nigel Ratburn (voice)
- Fries with That (2004) – Head Office Guy
- Tripping the Rift (2004–2007) – Additional voices
- Air Emergency (2005) – Voice over commentary
- Mr. Meaty (2005–2009) – Additional voice
- The Business (2006) – Rabbi Diamond
- René Lévesque (2006) George Marler
- Rumours (2006) – Interviewer
- Martin Morning (2006) – Additional voice (English dub)
- Indian Summer: The Oka Crisis (2006) – Alex Paterson
- Bethune (2006) – Andrei Ganit
- St. Urbain's Horseman (2007) – Critic
- Killer Wave (2007) – Reporter Brand
- Sophie (2008) – Official
- Being Human (2011) – Brinck
- O' (2012) – Barman
- Gawayn (2012) – Additional voice
- A Stranger in My Home (2013) – Albert Hajny
- 14 Tagebücher des Ersten Weltkriegs (2014) – Pireaud
- The Lottery (2014) – Pharmacist
- Mohawk Girls (2014) – Sommelier
- Helix (2015) – Dr. Pozniak
- 19-2 (2015) – Electrocuted Ma
- Jonathan Strange & Mr Norrell (2015) – Corpse 2
- The Fixer (2015) – McCann
- Natural Born Outlaws (2015) – Tommy Butler
- H_{2}O: Mermaid Adventures (2015) – Rikki's Dad
- The Art of More (2015–2016) – Auctioneer
- Real Detective (2016) – Rusk
- Béliveau (2017) – Commentateur match anglais, Dr. Lévesque
- Fatal Vows (2017) – Mr. Quast
- The Truth About the Harry Quebert Affair (2017) – Dr. Ashcroft
- The Detectives (2018) – Robert Keppel
- Deadly Secrets (2019) – Ashley
- En tout cas (2019) – Homme hôpital
- My Worst Nightmare (2019) – Dark Ma
- Street Legal (2019) – Unfamiliar Lawyer
- District 31 (2019) – Dr. William Faber
- Transplant (2020) – Announcement voice

=== Video games ===
- Hype: The Time Quest (1999) – Additional voices
- Evolution Worlds (2002) – Eugene Leopold, Campa, Infantryman #3
- Splinter Cell (2002) – President Bowers
- S2: Silent Storm (2003) – Additional voices
- Rainbow Six 3: Black Arrow (2004) – Additional voices
- Prince of Persia: Warrior Within (2004) – Additional voices
- Memorick: The Apprentice Knight (2004) – Additional voices
- Still Life (2005) – David Miller, Mark Ackerman, The Crow Man
- Far Cry Instincts (2005) – Additional voices
- Rainbow Six: Vegas (2006) – Additional voices
- Naruto: Rise of a Ninja (2007) – Additional voices
- Assassin's Creed (2007) – Sibrand
- Assassin's Creed II (2009) – Emilio Barbarigo
- Assassin's Creed: Brotherhood (2010) – Octavien de Valois
- Deus Ex: Human Revolution (2011) – Hugh Darrow
- Assassin's Creed: Revelations (2011) – Byzantine Guards
- Assassin's Creed III: Liberation (2012) – Gilbert Antoine de Saint-Maxent, Spanish Guardsman
- Deus Ex: Human Revolution - Director's Cut (2013) – Hugh Darrow
- Deus Ex: Mankind Divided (2016) – Safe Harbour Convention Attendee
- For Honor (2017) – Knight Warden
- Assassin's Creed: Origins (2017) – Phanos, Trireme Drummer
- Tom Clancy's Ghost Recon Breakpoint (2019) – Dr. Gregory Ballard

=== Writer ===
- Father Land
- Out of Control
- Simon in the Land of Chalk Drawings
- Potatoes and Dragons
- Sharky and George
- Bob in a Bottle
- Three Little Ghosts
- Lucky Luke
- The Book of Bob
- Ars Poetica
- Battered
