= Angela Galuppo =

Canadian film, TV and voice actress

- Born: Montreal, Quebec
- Occupation: Actress
- Years active: 1998–present

Angela Galuppo is a Canadian film, television and voice actress. She is best known as the frontlady of the Montreal-based band St. Ange, and for her recurring role as Bridget in the television series Being Human as well as providing the voice of Claudia Auditore da Firenze in the Assassin's Creed video games.

Galuppo's other voice acting credits include Winx Club as Bloom in the 4th season made by Cinelume, Fishtronaut as Marina and The Mysteries of Alfred Hedgehog as Milo. She has also appeared in a number of films including Living With the Enemy (2005), I'm Not There (2007), Picture This (2008), The Trotsky (2009) and Snowtime! (2015), and the television series The Dead Zone, Naked Josh, The Foundation, The Business and Against the Wall. She also voices Mei in the game I Am Alive.

Galuppo was an associate producer for theater ensemble Gravy Bath Productions and the New Classical Theatre Festival from 2002 to 2006. She graduated from the John Abbott College's Professional Theatre Program and Concordia University's Jazz Studies, she was the recipient of the 2004 Pamela Montgomery Award and the 2007 Dr. Oscar Peterson Jazz Scholarship.

== Filmography ==
- Supernatural: The Animation - 2011: Jessica Moore (English Dub Voice)
- Snowtime! (La Guerre des tuques 3D) - 2016: Luke
- Sahara - 2017: Eva
- Troll: The Tale of a Tail - 2018: Freia
- Zafari - 2018: Frick, Colette, Lulu
- Felix and the Treasure of Morgäa (Félix et le trésor de Morgäa) - 2021
