= JLA: Pain of the Gods =

Comic book

"The Pain of the Gods"
- Cover JLA: Pain of the Gods (2004), trade paperback edition, art by Ron Garney.
- Publisher: DC Comics
- Publication date: September – November 2004
- Genre: Superhero
- Title(s): JLA #101–106
- Main character: Justice League

Creative team
- Writer: Chuck Austen
- Penciller: Ron Garney

JLA: Pain of the Gods is a trade paperback which compiles issues #101-106 of the American comic book JLA, published by DC Comics. This story arc was written by Chuck Austen and penciled by Ron Garney.

== Synopsis ==
The story's premise is that Superman, Batman, Green Lantern, Martian Manhunter, Wonder Woman and The Flash have learned from painful experience what it means to fail. When Superman's actions cause the death of a rookie superhero, his grief and anger force each member of the Justice League to examine their darkest hour: the time when their power was not enough. The story shows Flash touched by tragedy in a burning tenement block, and Wonder Woman facing the prospect of death. JLA: Pain of the Gods is described as exposing the human side of superheroes.

== Main characters ==
- Superman: Also called the Man of Steel, he was born Kal-El on the planet Krypton, before being rocketed to Earth as an infant by his scientist father Jor-El, moments before Krypton's destruction. Discovered and adopted by a Kansas farmer and his wife, the child is raised as Clark Kent and imbued with a strong moral compass. Very early he started to display superhuman abilities, which upon reaching maturity he resolved to use for the benefit of humanity.
- Batman: Batman's secret identity is Bruce Wayne, an American millionaire (later billionaire) playboy, industrialist, and philanthropist. Having witnessed the murder of his parents as a child, he swore revenge on criminals, an oath tempered with the greater ideal of justice. Wayne trains himself both physically and intellectually and dons a bat-themed costume in order to fight crime. Batman operates in the fictional American Gotham City.
- Green Lantern: John Stewart is the third Green Lantern of Earth, formerly a sniper for the U.S. Marines and an architect. His power ring grants him the ability to make energy constructs guided by thought using his willpower. Originally given Green Lantern Corps membership after his predecessor Hal Jordan left the position.
- Flash: Also called the "Fastest Man Alive" and the "Scarlet Speedster", Wally West is the third incarnation of The Flash and was also the first Kid Flash. His powers all center around his super-speed abilities.
- Wonder Woman: Wonder Woman is a warrior Princess of the Amazons (based on the Amazons of Greek mythology) and was created by William Moulton Marston, an American, as a "distinctly feminist role model whose mission was to bring the Amazon ideals of love, peace, and sexual equality to a world torn by the hatred of men". Known in her homeland as Diana of Themyscira, her powers include superhuman strength, flight (even though the original Wonder Woman did not have this ability), super-speed, super-stamina, and super-agility. She is highly proficient in hand-to-hand combat and in the art of tactical warfare. She also possesses animal-like cunning skills and a natural rapport with animals, which has been presented as an actual ability to communicate with the animal kingdom. She uses her Lasso of Truth, which forces those bound by it to tell the truth, a pair of indestructible bracelets, a tiara which serves as a projectile, and, in some stories, an invisible airplane.
- Martian Manhunter: Also known as J'onn J'onzz and John Jones, he is a superhero from the planet Mars and the last surviving Green Martian. A Martian holocaust killed his wife and daughter, nearly driving him mad, until he was brought to Earth in an accident caused by scientist Saul Erdel. His natural abilities include super-strength, super-speed, invulnerability, flight, shape-shifting, intangibility and telepathy. He has been a member of almost every incarnation of the Justice League of America. Although he holds great reverence for his home world, he has come to greatly respect his adopted world as well and protects it as his home. In his secret identity, to blend into humanity, he is a gritty hard-boiled police officer.

== Main creators ==
- Chuck Austen wrote comic books for several years during the early part of this new millennium. He wrote over forty issues of various X-Men titles, more than a dozen Superman stories, JLA: Pain of the Gods, Captain America, U.S. War Machine, and many, many others, including his own creation: Boys of Summer, a manga with Tokyopop. He left the industry to write some novels and screenplays. Chuck also co-created the animated television series Tripping the Rift, which won the Playboy Animation Festival Grand Prize. Boys of Summer was named one of the top ten manga for 2006 by Publishers Weekly, and Chuck is the only comic book writer ever to win the Genesis Award for Outstanding Artistic Achievement. Before that, he worked for many years on the popular, animated television series King of the Hill as well as the first two seasons of The Cleveland Show, for FOX. He worked at Nickelodeon on a CG animated comedy series debuting Fall of 2011, Robot and Monster. Austen wrote two novels, Something Old, Something New (released in July 2011) and a sequel to Nekkid Bottoms called Pride and Nakedness.
- Ron Garney has been a professional comics illustrator since 1989. Over the course of his career, he has made a name for himself tackling some of the industry's famous characters such as the Hulk, Silver Surfer, the X-Men, the Justice League, and Captain America. He has been listed in Wizard Magazine's 'top ten' artists, and has been nominated twice for the Eisner Award, for best penciller and best serialized story for Captain America with Mark Waid.
