= The Boys of Summer =

The Boys of Summer may refer to one of several literary and musical works:

- The Boys of Summer (book), a 1972 book by Roger Kahn
- "The Boys of Summer" (song), a 1984 song by Don Henley
- "Boys of Summer" (The Wire), a 2006 television episode
- Boys of Summer (comics), a manga comic
- "I See the Boys of Summer", a poem by Dylan Thomas

== See also ==
- Girls of Summer
