= The Trouble with Girls =

The Trouble with Girls may refer to:

- The Trouble with Girls (film), a 1969 film starring Elvis Presley
- The Trouble with Girls (comics), published 1987–1993 by Malibu Comics
- "The Trouble with Girls" (song), by Scotty McCreery from the album Clear as Day
