= Worldwatch =

Worldwatch may refer to:

- Worldwatch Institute, an environmental research organization based in Washington, D.C.
- World Watch, an Australian television programming block of foreign news bulletins
  - SBS WorldWatch, an Australian free-to-air television channel owned and operated by the Special Broadcasting Service (SBS)
- WorldWatch, an American creator-owned comic book limited series
