= U.S. War Machine =

American comic book series

- The cover to U.S. War Machine #12, art by Chuck Austen

Publication information
- Publisher: Marvel Comics
- Schedule: Weekly
Title(s)
U.S. War Machine
(12 issues, November 2001 - January 2002)
U.S. War Machine 2.0
(3 issues, September 2003)
- Formats: Original material for the series has been published as a set of limited series.
- Genre: Superhero
- Main character(s): War Machine

Creative team
- Writer(s): Chuck Austen
- Artist(s): Chuck Austen
- Editor(s): Ralph Macchio

U.S. War Machine is an American comic book series which was published by Marvel Comics. It was one of the launch titles for the company's mature readers Max imprint, and used an experimental format - it featured no adverts, black-and-white art and was a weekly title. While based on extant Marvel characters, the series was reimagined by writer-artist Chuck Austen and took place outside the regular Marvel Universe. A second three-issue mini-series followed in 2003, using computer-generated art by Christian Moore.

== Creation ==
Austen had worked on various independent comic series as writer and/or artist during the 1980s before moving into animation in the 1990s. He returned to the industry after pitching to Marvel's new editor-in-chief Joe Quesada in 2000, and began a well-received run as artist on Elektra for the Marvel Knights subline. He included a short sample of U. S. War Machine in a pitch to Quesada as part of his hope to bring some of the lessons he had learnt from working in animation to comics. The series was commissioned, and would be his first work for Marvel as a writer. The series was assigned to the recently launched Max imprint, which broke from the Comics Code Authority; it was one of the line's four launch titles, alongside Brian Michael Bendis' Alias and Garth Ennis' Fury.

He credited his background as a military brat and his childhood interest in G.I. Joe as factors in his interest in the character of War Machine, a spin-off of Marvel's long-running Iron Man comic featuring James Rhodes. The character's solo series had ended in 1996, and for a time the War Machine identity fell into disuse. Austen liked Rhodes as a character, especially the potential he saw in writing for a black character. While he did not consider his own race as an obstacle for writing a black character, Austen did run his scripts past a female African American friend before submitting them. He was a big fan of David Michelinie and Bob Layton's work on the characters but felt more recent Iron Man series had become bogged down in continuity. Austen felt the art would have a "more open, less noir-ish" than his work on Elektra, and drew on the work of manga artists such as Rumiko Takahashi and Katsuhiro Otomo. As with Elektra he used art software for the project, including Ray Dream Studio and 3D Studio Max. Max editor Stuart Moore compared the series to a Hong Kong action film. The series was set outside the Marvel Universe, with Austen describing the setting as "the real world with a genius like Tony Stark in it". The decision allowed Austen to follow a more adult tone while avoiding the constraint of having "Thor living down the street".

== Publication history ==
Quesada suggested the format of a black-and-white weekly, to which Austen was highly responsive despite the workload, calling it "A graphic novel in three months. It's awesome." Each issue was priced cheaply, at $1.50 an issue. The series debuted the day after the September 11 attacks, something Austen would later credit with adding to the book's positive reception. Partway through the series, Austen accepted an offer to begin writing Uncanny X-Men. As a result the series ended after the initial 12 issues, when Austen had initially planned to follow it with further arcs.

In 2003, Austen returned to the characters to produce sequel U.S. War Machine 2.0, published across three weeks in September 2003. Unlike the original, Austen only wrote the sequel, which featured 3-dimensional computer-generated art by Christian Moore, who had impressed Marvel president Bill Jemas with a pitch at a comic convention. In 2008, Official Handbook of the Marvel Universe A to Z #5 designated the U.S. War Machine universe as Earth-112001.

== Plot ==
Tony Stark, head of Stark Industries, decides to announce the company's withdrawal from weapons manufacturing after an incident in Latveria where he was forced to use the experimental War Machine MP1-2100 mobile infantry suit personally after a run-in with Victor von Doom's security forces. This includes discontinuing the US military contract for the War Machine; instead, he unveils a downsized version that will be used exclusively by his bodyguards, the SI1-221 Iron Man. However, the announcement is overshadowed when pilot James Rhodes takes a War Machine prototype as he was running late for a date, only to end up executing A.I.M. agents live on TV after a botched, impromptu attempt to rescue a woman they were holding hostage leaves seven people dead.

Rhodes is fired as the stress of the fall-out drives Stark further towards drink. On returning to his apartment, Rhodes is attacked by Parnell Jacobs - a former Iron Man pilot who went rogue in another War Machine prototype and had to be brought down by Rhodes and fellow pilots Happy Hogan and Bethany Cabe. After a scuffle they are interrupted by a call from Nick Fury of S.H.I.E.L.D., an old acquaintance of Rhodes'. The pair are collected and taken to the Helicarrier. Parnell tells Rhodes the reason for his visit - his wife Glenda has been kidnapped by A.I.M. agents, and he is unable to help as he sold the stolen War Machine suit to Hydra. Fury shows them a small group of scavenged, modified War Machine armours. Fury offers Rhodes the chance to head up a new S.H.I.E.L.D. Special Operations division, U. S. War Machine, with Parnell as one of the members.

Their first mission is to combat a planned A.I.M. act of racial genocide. Rhodes agrees to head up the team, and while he feels Parnell is a loose cannon he selects him for the operation due to his previous experience with the suit. Dum Dum Dugan is assigned to work with the small team which includes the enthusiastic Nathan Manning. The suits are overseen by obnoxious 12-year old boy genius Scotch, who reverse-engineered much of Stark's work; after meeting him, Rhodes is taken to see Darkhawk. A former vigilante thought to have based his armor on Stark technology but also used alien technology, and the ranting Darkhawk is kept sedated by S.H.I.E.L.D. feeding him in-depth virtual reality scenarios, though Dugan prevents Scotch telling Rhodes much about the captive. Fury tells him Darkhawk is too unstable to join the operation, and instead the initial team consists of Rhodes, Parnell, Manning, Jorge Salsero, Saburo Sakai and Sheva Josephs. The group are given a two-week crash training course before insertion into Latveria, where the A.I.M. ethnic cleansing project is operating.

The mission soon goes awry as Nathan's power unit takes a direct hit from the A.I.M. guards, immobilising him. A furious Rhodey realises Scotch has put the War Machine's power cell on the front of the suit's chest and attempts to abort the mission, but the unit comes under fire. Separated with Parnell and Nathan, Rhodes pulls the helmet off one of the A.I.M. guards, finding that one of them is exactly the same man he killed on the freeway. Meanwhile Sheva, Sakai and Jorge find Parnell's wife is heavily pregnant, complicating their plan to sneak her out in an A.I.M. uniform after leaving their suits. The group are cornered by A.I.M. reinforcements and Rhodes leaves Parnell with Manning and the captured guard to provide help. Sakai loses a hand stopping a grenade, but despite his best efforts Jorge and Glenda are killed in the explosion. The survivors are evacuated with the captive, though Rhodes has to disable the distraught Parnell to get him out.

On returning to the Helicarrier, an enraged Rhodes hunts down Scotch and demands an overhaul of the War Machines to remove the weaknesses, telling the teenager he will be inside the armor during tests. Fury meanwhile is surprisingly sanguine, feeling the mission functioned passably as a shakedown. Nathan is able to make some headway with pulling Parnell out of his distress while Rhodes visits the injured Sakai, and after berating him for breaking protocol by leaving the armor, but tells him he will find a place for him in the unit if he wants it. Rhodes is then shown the bizarre creature that caught his attention on an A.I.M. truck before his firing. Fury calls it M.O.D.O.K., an experiment that briefly took over the operation. Despite its skeletal appearance, M.O.D.O.K. still appears to be alive, and can follow basic commands. Both M.O.D.O.K. and Dugan, who has customised a War Machine with a bowler hat, are added to the next U. S. War Machine operation. They begin interrogating the captive, who reveals the A.I.M. guards are telepathically linked clones, who have never seen the organisation's new leader. He reveals A.I.M. plans to release a pathogen designed to give all those of African descent sickle-cell anaemia, with patient zero due for infection in the next 48 hours. The unit prepares for combat, and Fury agrees to allow the insane Darkhawk to join the mission after technicians are able to blend his simulated reality to help by convincing him Rhodes is War Machine, a member of the West Coast Avengers asking for his help against Doctor Demonicus. Unhappy that A.I.M. are operating in Latveria, Victor von Doom grants S.H.I.E.L.D. permission to attack the facility.

Darkhawk breaks off early, forcing Rhodes to follow him down separate from the rest of the unit. The War Machines begin carving their way through to A.I.M. guards, though Rhodes' suit begins to run low on power. A.I.M. respond with their own armored suit, which is dealt with by Nathan and Parnell; however, Nathan is killed by a bazooka round shortly afterwards. With Darkhawk massacring most of the guards, Rhodes finds the new head of A.I.M. - a white supremacist who promptly produces Glenda, alive and well after being revived and planned as patient zero. He plans to use her as leverage for his own escape but is surprised by the sudden appearance of M.O.D.O.K., giving Darkhawk chance to get Glenda to safety and Rhodes to get repowered. Parnell is reunited at his wife, but at that moment von Doom arrives, clad in his own armor. Rhodes orders Parnell to get Glenda to safety while Dugan extracts the A.I.M. leader while Rhodes and Darkhawk battle Doom, furious at being scarred during Stark's mission to Latveria. Doom explodes the Darkhawk's head, and Rhodes is only saved when M.O.D.O.K. attacks Doom telepathically before also being destroyed. Rhodes fires all of the War Machine's ordinance at Doom with only limited success before Shiva arrives, having procured A.I.M. samples of further diseases planned to wipe out all other non-white races - the revelation that the operation has saved those of similar heritage to Doom's mother persuades the Latverian dictator to stay his hand, though he insists the A.I.M. leader is left in his hands. He lets the S.H.I.E.L.D. team collect their dead and leave; on the extraction helicopter Darkhawk's head reappears and he returns to life. Rhodes meanwhile pays a visit to Kyra Powell - guardian of Jennifer, the daughter of the woman killed on the freeway, and tells her when she's old enough to tell her that her mother helped save the world. Meanwhile news of the Latveria raid goes public, and a furious Tony Stark vows he will take back his technology from S.H.I.E.L.D.

Despite Bethany's attempts to talk him out of it and his growing drinking problem, Stark insists on planning to raid S.H.I.E.L.D. and confront Rhodes. Meanwhile the War Machine unit attacks an arms deal in England, but an agent called Seamus is able to escape with plutonium and a neutron gun. Fury calls in Captain America, Clint Barton and Sam Wilson to help with the operation, and they track the missing weapons to an NFA splinter-group that are targeting London. Captain America believes Doom is bankrolling the terrorists, but as the S.H.I.E.L.D. forces prepare to move out Stark arrives with Hogan, Cabe and Edward March, all wearing Iron Man suits. Rhodes is able to persuade Stark to join the anti-terrorist operation for the time being; the industrialist is shaken by the brutality employed by his former employee, but deduces the device will be activated from the London Eye. Doom arrives to stop them, and Captain America keeps him busy while Rhodes and Stark head for the bomb. Stark disables the warhead but is massively injured by its defence systems, while Barton is able to fire an arrow through Doom's head. Stark is left in a vegetative state; in a gesture of thanks to his old friend, Rhodes arranges for him to be connected to the Darkhawk scenario so he can at least dream of being a hero.

== Collected editions ==
The first series was collected in a single trade paperback. As of 2025, U. S. War Machine 2.0 has not been collected.

| Title | ISBN | Release date | Contents |
|---|---|---|---|
| U.S. War Machine | 9780785108542 | 28 January 2002 | U.S. War Machine #1-12 |

== Reception ==
Austen recalled the first series as being well-received. In a retrospective run-down on War Machine's history before the character's appearance in Iron Man 2, Entertainment Weekly's Darren Franich described U. S. War Machine as a "bleakly funny and totally weird take on the War Machine character". Covering Austen's history with Marvel for ComicsAlliance, Chris Sims reminisced that he enjoyed the series when he was 19 as "this crazy over-the-top action movie done with Marvel characters", but looking back expressed reservations over some of the art and the typeset lettering.
