= Eden's Trail =

Comic book series

Eden's Trail is a five-issue Marvel Comics limited series created in 2003 by Chuck Austen and Steve Uy. The story focuses on a young woman named Tila and a man named Latch, who is immortal and seeks a way to rid himself of his immortality. Steve Uy has stated his disdain for the series, as he had little control of the story.
