= The Call of Duty (comics) =

Series of Marvel Comics

The Call of Duty was a series of short-lived Marvel Comics series featuring firefighters and emergency service workers dealing with paranormal phenomena in the Marvel Universe. Despite the similar title, it is entirely unconnected with the Call of Duty video game series and does not adapt the stories of the games.

It was conceived in the wake of the September 11, 2001 attack and consists of three limited series (The Call of Duty: The Brotherhood #1–6, by Chuck Austen and David Finch; The Call of Duty: The Precinct #1–5, by Bruce Jones and Tom Mandrake; The Call of Duty: The Wagon #1–4 by Chuck Austen and Danijel Zezelj) and a short unsuccessful run as an ongoing series in 2002–2003, that lasted four issues (by Chuck Austen and Pat Olliffe).
