= Danijel Žeželj =

Croatian artist (born 1966)

- Born: Danijel Žeželj; 7 December 1966 (age 59)
- Areas: Writer, Penciller, Inker

Danijel Žeželj (Croatian pronunciation: [dǎnijel ʒěʒeʎ]; born 7 December 1966) is a Croatian comic book artist, animator, painter and illustrator and author of a number of graphic novels.

== Biography ==
Žeželj studied classical painting, sculpting and printing at the Academy of Fine Arts in Zagreb, Croatia.

His work has been published and exhibited in Croatia, Slovenia, UK, Switzerland, France, Italy, Spain, Greece, Sweden, South Africa, Argentina, Brazil and the USA.

His comics and illustrations have been published abroad by DC Comics/Vertigo, Marvel Comics, The New York Times Book Review, Harper's Magazine, San Francisco Guardian, Editori del Grifo, Edizioni Charta and others.

Since 1999, in collaboration with musician/composer Jessica Lurie, he has created a series of multimedia performances merging live music with live painting. These have been presented at festivals and in clubs, churches and squats throughout Europe and the USA.

In 2005 he became the first comic book artist ever to have a solo exhibition at the Isabella Stewart Gardner Museum in Boston, Massachusetts.

In 2001 in Zagreb, Croatia he founded the publishing house and graphic workshop "Petikat". Most recently he worked on animated films at Zagreb Film.

He lives and works both in New York and Zagreb. He was married to Jessica Lurie, an American composer and musician.

== Bibliography ==
- Luna Park, written by Kevin Baker, DC Comics/Vertigo, USA, 2009
- King of Nekropolis, Hazard Edizioni, Italy, 2007
- Stray Dogs, ISGM/Charta, USA, 2005
- Small Hands, Petikat, Croatia, 2004; Edizioni Di, Italy, 2005
- Caballo, Petikat, Croatia, 2004
- Reflex Petikat, Croatia, 2003
- Superman: Metropolis, DC Comics, USA, 2003
- Stazione Topolo, Grifo Edizioni, Italy, 2002
- Bolivian Dark, Petikat, Croatia, 2002
- The Call of Duty: The Wagon, written by Chuck Austen, Marvel, USA, 2002
- Captain America: Dead Men Running, written by Darko Macan, Marvel, USA, 2002
- 24 Hours, Grifo Edizioni, Italy, 2002
- Rinzol, Petikat, Croatia, 2001
- Sandman Presents: Corinthian: Death in Venice, written by Darko Macan, DC Comics/Vertigo, USA, 2001
- El Diablo, written by Brian Azzarello, DC Comics/Vertigo, USA, 2001
- Air Mexico, Clandestino, USA, 2000
- Il Sorriso di Majakovskij, Edizioni Di, Italy, 2000
- Reve de Beton, Mosquito, France, 2000
- Congo Bill, written by Scott Cunningham, DC Comics/Vertigo, USA, 1999; Mosquito, France, 2000; Magic Press, Italy, 2001
- Invitation a la Danse, Mosquito, France, 1999
- L'Amore, Edizioni Di, Italy, 1999
- La Peste, Edizioni Di, Italy, 1998
- Amazonia, Edizioni Di, Italy, 1998
- L'Angelo Sterminatore, Edizioni Di, Italy, 1997
- Pagliacci: In Your Eyes: Blues, Liberty, Italy, 1996
- Rex, Radio 101, Croatia, 1995; Edizioni Di, Italy, 2000; Mosquito, France, 2001
- Sophia, Editori del Grifo, Italy, 1994; X-press & Radio 101, Croatia, 1994
- Sun City, Editori del Grifo, Italy, 1994; Kaspar & Radio 101, Croatia, 1993, Coma 22, Italy, 2007
- Il Ritmo del Cuore, Editori del Grifo, Italy, 1993; Mosquito, France, 2005

== Notes ==
=== General references ===
- Danijel Žeželj at the Grand Comics Database
- Danijel Žeželj at the Comic Book DB (archived from the original)
- Danijel Žeželj at Lambiek's Comiclopedia
