= Steve Uy =

American comic book artist and writer (born 1979)

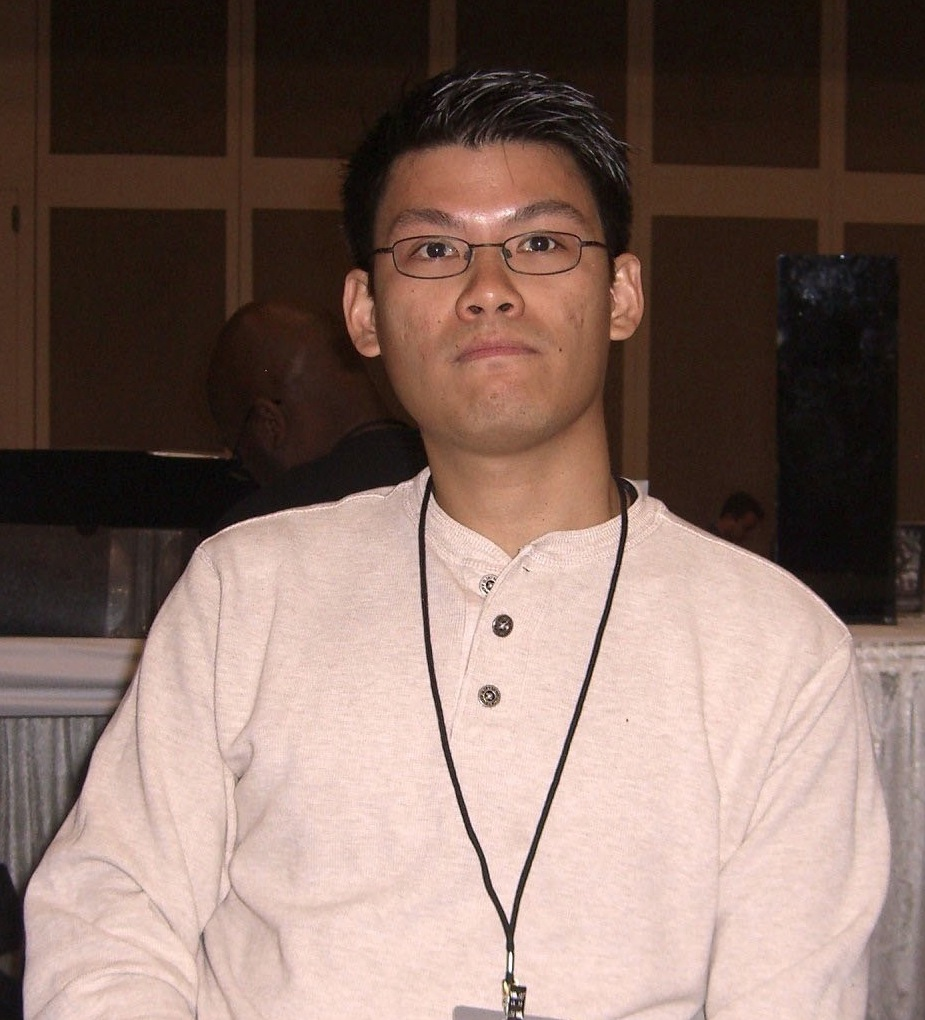
- Uy at the New York Comic Con in Manhattan, October 10, 2010
- Born: January 11, 1979 (age 47)
- Areas: Writer, Artist

Steve Uy (born January 11, 1979) is an American comic book artist and writer.

== Career ==
Steve Uy began working for Marvel Comics after graduating from the School of Visual Arts in New York. His work started out as cover art for certain titles such as Iceman, and later on he worked on the mini-series Eden's Trail with Chuck Austen.

Later on he went to Image Comics to work on another mini-series, Feather, and afterward did the mini-series Jova's Harvest for Arcana Studios.

Uy worked on several issues of Avengers: The Initiative including a special written by Christos Gage and Dan Slott.

Steve Uy was one of the illustrators of Grumpy Cat Vol. 1: Awful-ly Big Comics Collection a 2020 book by Ablaze Publishing.
