= JLA (comic book) =

Comic book

- Cover for JLA #1, art by Howard Porter and John Dell. From left to right: Batman, Aquaman, Wonder Woman, Martian Manhunter, Superman, Green Lantern (Kyle Rayner), and the Flash (Wally West).

Publication information
- Publisher: DC Comics
- Schedule: Monthly
- Format: Ongoing series
- Genre: Superhero
- Publication date: November 1996 – February 2006
- No. of issues: 126 (#1–125, plus an issue numbered #1,000,000)
- Main character: Justice League of America

Creative team
- Created by: Grant Morrison; Howard Porter
- Written by: Grant Morrison (1-17, 22-31, 34-41, 1,000,000), Mark Waid (18-21, 32-33, 43-58, 60), Chuck Dixon (59), Joe Kelly (61-76, 78-90, 100), Denny O'Neil (91-93), Chris Claremont (94-99), Chuck Austen (101–106), Kurt Busiek (61, 107–114), Geoff Johns (115–119), Allan Heinberg (115–119), Bob Harras (120–125)
- Penciller(s): Howard Porter; Bryan Hitch; Doug Mahnke
- Inker(s): John Dell; Paul Neary

Collected editions
- New World Order: ISBN 1-56389-369-X

JLA was a monthly comic book published by DC Comics from January 1997 to April 2006 featuring the Justice League of America (JLA, Justice League). The series restarted DC's approach to the Justice League, which had initially featured most of the company's top-tier superheroes but shifted in the 1980s to featuring a rotating cast of established characters alongside newer ones and also saw that franchise expand to several spin-off series, diluting the prestige of the name brand. When relaunched by writer Grant Morrison, the team again focused on the most recognizable, powerful, and long-lasting heroes in DC's library.

== Publication history ==
The low sales of the various Justice League spin-off books by the mid-1990s prompted DC to revamp the League as a single team (all the various branch teams were disbanded) on a single title. A Justice League of America formed in the September 1996 limited series Justice League: A Midsummer's Nightmare by Mark Waid and Fabian Nicieza. In 1997, DC Comics launched a new Justice League series titled JLA, written by Grant Morrison with art by Howard Porter and inker John Dell. Morrison stayed as writer for the series through issue #41, though several issues had fill-in writers. JLA #18-#21 and #33 were written by Mark Waid. Mark Millar, Devin Grayson and Mark Waid, and J.M. DeMatteis wrote issues #27, 32 and 35, respectively.

This series, in an attempt at a "back-to-basics" approach, used as its core the team's original and most famous seven members (or their successors): Superman, Batman, Wonder Woman, Aquaman, the Flash (Wally West), Green Lantern (Kyle Rayner), and Martian Manhunter. Additionally, the team received a new headquarters, the "Watchtower", based on the Moon. JLA quickly became DC's best-selling title, a position it maintained on and off for several years.

Morrison introduced the idea of the JLA allegorically representing a pantheon of gods, with their different powers and personalities, incorporating such characters as Zauriel, Big Barda, Orion, Huntress, Barbara Gordon (Oracle), Steel (John Henry Irons), and Plastic Man. They also had Aztek, Tomorrow Woman, and Green Arrow (Connor Hawke) as temporary members.

Under Morrison, the series pitted the League against a variety of enemies including the White Martians, renegade angels, a new incarnation of the Injustice Gang led by Lex Luthor, and the Key. Other foes were the new villain Prometheus, the existing JLA villain Starro, "the Ultra-Marines", and a futuristic Darkseid. Morrison's run culminated in an arc titled "World War III", which involves the New Gods preparing the Earth for battle against a creature known as "Mageddon", a super-sentient weapon of mass destruction.

Since this new League included most of DC's most powerful heroes, the focus of the stories changed. The League now dealt only with Earth-shattering, highest-priority threats which could challenge their tremendous combined power. Enemies faced by this new JLA included an invading army of aliens, a malfunctioning war machine from the future, a horde of renegade angels, a newly reformed coalition of villains as a counter-league, mercenaries armed with individualized take-down strategies for each superhero, various cosmic threats, and the enraged spirit of the Earth itself. In addition, because almost all of the members had their own comics, the stories were almost always self-contained, with all chapters occurring within JLA itself and very rarely affecting events outside of that series. Developments from a hero's own title (such as the new costume and electric-based powers temporarily adopted by Superman in 1997–1998) were reflected in the League's comic book, however.

Morrison departed with issue #41, after which the book saw runs by Mark Waid and Joe Kelly. Subsequent to this, the series switched to a series of rotating writers with issue #91 while Kelly (via JLA #100) was given the miniseries Justice League Elite #1-12, which featured Green Arrow, the Flash, and several other characters. The new format saw stories by John Byrne, Chuck Austen, and Kurt Busiek. Geoff Johns and Allan Heinberg would take over the book with #115, which saw a multi-part storyline dealing with the aftermath of Identity Crisis, and served as a lead-in to the events of Infinite Crisis, as Superboy-Prime destroyed the Watchtower at the end of issue #119. Bob Harras wrote the book's final storyline (JLA #120–125) as Green Arrow struggled to keep the League afloat.

== Storylines ==
Despite all of this, DC did not create continuing spin-off series as it had done before. Instead, a large number of miniseries and one-shots featuring the team were released. One spin-off team, the Justice League Elite was created following the events of JLA #100, but their miniseries was limited to 12 issues, and the team appeared only once after the miniseries ended its run. JLA's popularity was also able to launch the JSA series, which was relaunched as Justice Society of America to coincide with the new Justice League of America book.

In 2005, a story arc by Geoff Johns and Alan Heinberg called "Crisis of Conscience" (JLA #115–119) depicted the dissolution of the Justice League of America as the breakdown of trust shown in the 2004 limited series Identity Crisis reached its zenith. At the end of the arc, Superboy-Prime destroyed the Justice League Watchtower. JLA, one of several titles to be cancelled at the conclusion of the Infinite Crisis storyline, ended with issue #125.

As depicted in the Villains United: Infinite Crisis Special and the final issue of Infinite Crisis itself, preparations for the defense of Metropolis against an army of organized supervillains required a brief and temporary expansion of the Justice League to its largest roster to date. The main defensive teams of the JLA, JSA, Teen Titans, and Outsiders already being occupied elsewhere by the Crisis, it fell on Oracle and Martian Manhunter to contact and deputize seemingly every active or once active hero in the DC Universe as Justice League members, effective immediately, to form a last line of defense for the city.

== Reception ==
The new approach worked, and JLA quickly became DC's best-selling title, a position it maintained on and off for several years, as reflected in the following advance sales figures for months in which JLA was DC's best-selling title:

- January 1997 (78,400)
- February 1997 (81,500)
- May 1997 (103,500)
- June 1997 (104,000)
- July 1997 (two issues: 104,900 and 104,400)
- August 1997 (104,700)
- September 1997 (107,000)
- October 1997 (111,200)
- November 1997 (111,400)
- December 1997 (109,100)
- January 1998 (108,900)
- February 1998 (101,400)
- March 1998 (101,500)
- May 1998 (99,500)
- June 1998 (100,000)
- July 1998 (97,300)
- August 1998 (95,300)
- September 1998 (100,300)
- October 1998 (93,200)
- November 1998 (92,200)
- January 1999 (89,900)
- March 1999 (86,000)
- May 1999 (86,500)
- June 1999 (86,900)
- July 1999 (85,600)
- August 1999 (84,000) [5th highest among all publishers]
- September 1999 (83,400) [3rd highest among all publishers]
- November 1999 (80,000) [5th highest among all publishers]
- December 1999 (84,200) [6th highest among all publishers]
- January 2000 (78,300) [4th highest among all publishers]
- February 2000 (75,200) [6th highest among all publishers]
- March 2000 (77,100) [4th highest among all publishers]
- April 2000 (73,700) [6th highest among all publishers]
- May 2000 (76,900) [4th highest among all publishers]
- June 2000 (76,800) [5th highest among all publishers]
- July 2000 (75,400) [5th highest among all publishers]

== Collected editions ==
JLA was collected in a series of trade paperbacks:

- New World Order (collects JLA #1–4, 1997, 1-56389-369-X)
- American Dreams (collects JLA #5–9, 1998, 1-56389-394-0)
- Rock of Ages (collects JLA #10–15, 1998, 1-56389-416-5)
- Strength in Numbers (collects JLA #16–23, New Year's Evil: Prometheus #1 and "Heroes" from JLA Secret Files and Origins #2, 1998, 1-56389-435-1)
- Justice for All (collects JLA #24–33, 1999, 1-56389-511-0)
- World War III (collects JLA #34–41, 2000, 1-56389-618-4)
- Tower of Babel (collects JLA #42–46, JLA Secret Files and Origins #3 and JLA 80-Page Giant #1, 1-56389-727-X)
- Divided We Fall (collects JLA #47–54, 1-56389-793-8)
- Terror Incognita (collects JLA #55–60, 1-56389-936-1)
- Golden Perfect (collects JLA #61–65, 1-56389-941-8)
- The Obsidian Age (Book 1) (collects JLA #66–71, 1-56389-991-4)
- The Obsidian Age (Book 2) (collects JLA #72–76, 1-4012-0043-5)
- Rules of Engagement (collects JLA #77–82, 1-4012-0215-2)
- Trial by Fire (collects JLA #84–89, 1-4012-0242-X)
- The Tenth Circle (collects JLA #94–99, 1-4012-0346-9)
- Pain of the Gods (collects JLA #101–106, 1-4012-0468-6)
- Syndicate Rules (collects JLA #107–114 and a story from JLA Secret Files and Origins 2004, 1-4012-0477-5)
- Crisis of Conscience (collects JLA #115–119, 1-4012-0963-7)
- World Without a Justice League (collects JLA #120–125, 1-4012-0964-5)

There is also a Deluxe Edition series:

- JLA Deluxe Edition:
  - Hardcovers:
    - Vol. 1 (collects JLA #1–9 and JLA Secret Files and Origins #1, 256 pages, deluxe hardcover, September 2008, Titan, 1-84576-884-1, DC, 1-4012-1843-1)
    - Vol. 2 (collects JLA #10–17, New Year's Evil: Prometheus and JLA/WildC.A.T.S., 320 pages, deluxe hardcover, Titan, July 2009, ISBN 1-84856-320-5, DC, June 2009, 1-4012-2265-X)
    - Vol. 3 (collects JLA #22-26, 28–31 and 1,000,000, 256 pages, deluxe hardcover. April 28, 2010, DC Comics 1-4012-2659-0)
    - Vol. 4 (collects JLA #34, 36–41, JLA: Classified #1–3 and JLA: Earth 2, 368 pages, deluxe hardcover. November 10, 2010, DC Comics, 1-4012-2909-3)
    - Tower Of Babel (collects JLA #18-21, 32-33, 43-46 and JLA Secret Files and Origins #3, 280 pages, deluxe hardcover. April 21, 2021, DC Comics, 1-77950-951-0)
  - Softcovers:
    - Vol. 1 (collects JLA #1–9 and JLA Secret Files and Origins #1, 256 pages, softcover, October 2011, DC Comics, 1-4012-3314-7)
    - Vol. 2 (collects JLA #10–17, New Year's Evil: Prometheus, JLA Secret Files and Origins #2, and JLA/WildC.A.T.S., 336 pages, softcover, DC Comics.com 1-4012-3518-2)
    - Vol. 3 (collects JLA #18–31, 344 pages, softcover, January 2013, DC Comics, 1-4012-3832-7)
    - Vol. 4 (collects JLA #32–46, 384 pages, softcover, February 11, 2014, DC Comics, 1-4012-4385-1)
    - Vol. 5 (collects JLA #47–60, and JLA: Heaven's Ladder, 448 pages, softcover, June 17, 2014, DC Comics, 1-4012-4750-4)
    - Vol. 6 (collects JLA #61–76, 432 pages, softcover, January 27, 2015, DC Comics, 1-4012-5136-6)
    - Vol. 7 (collects JLA #77–93, 416 pages, softcover, May 26, 2015, DC Comics, 978-1-4012-5528-2)
    - Vol. 8 (collects JLA #94–106, 360 pages, softcover, May 10, 2016, DC Comics, 978-1-4012-6342-3)
    - Vol. 9 (collects JLA #107–125, 480 pages, softcover, Nov 25, 2016, DC Comics, 978-1-4012-6567-0)

== See also ==
- Justice League Elite
- JLA: Earth 2
- DC One Million
- World War III
