= Ben Lai =

Canadian comic book penciler

- Born: Montreal, Quebec, Canada
- Area: Penciller

Ben Lai is a Canadian comic book penciler who worked on series such as Sigil, Radix, Thor and X-Men. His brother, Ray Lai, often inks his work.

In 2002, the Lai brothers were involved in a controversy when the Massachusetts Institute of Technology used an image from Radix #1 in a $50 million grant proposal for the development of battlefield armor for the United States military.

== Bibliography ==
- CrossGen Primer #1, (with writers Barbara Kesel and Ron Marz, CrossGen Comics, 2000)
- CrossGenesis #1, (with writers Barbara Kesel and Ron Marz, CrossGen Comics, 2000)
- CrossGen Sampler #1, (with writers Barbara Kesel and Ron Marz, CrossGen Comics, 2000)
- Sigil #1-5, (with writer Barbara Kesel, CrossGen Comics, 2000)
- Radix #1-3 (CrossGen comics, 2001–2002)
- G.I. Joe Battle Files #2, (with writers Josh Blaylock and Scott Wherle, Devil's Due Publishing, 2002)
- Guard Force #1, (with writer Chuck Austen, Marvel Comics, 2003)
- Thor #61-62, 64–65, 67, 70, (with writer Dan Jurgens, Marvel Comics, 2003)
- Ultimate X-Men #26, (with writer Mark Millar, Marvel Comics, 2003)
- X-Men Unlimited #1, (with writer Tony Lee, Marvel Comics, 2004)
- All-New Official Handbook of the Marvel Universe A-Z #6, (with various writers, Marvel Comics, 2006)
- Ultimate Secrets #1, (with various writers, Marvel Comics, 2008)
