= WorldWatch =

American comic book series

- The cover to WorldWatch #1. Clockwise from top-left: Intercessor, War Woman, Omnia, Doc Gulliver, Satyr, Fastball, Sergeant Mercury, Ecto-Lass. Art by Tom Derenick and Norm Rapmund.

Publication information
- Publisher: Wild and Wooly Press
- Format: Limited series
- Genre: Superhero
- Publication date: July – December 2004
- No. of issues: 3
- Main character: WorldWatch

Creative team
- Written by: Chuck Austen
- Penciller: Tom Derenick
- Inker: Norm Rapmund
- Colorist: Daniel Brown

WorldWatch is an American creator-owned comic book limited series created by Chuck Austen and published through his own Wild and Wooly Press label. It was aimed at mature readers, featuring graphic nudity, sex and violence. Three of the planned seven issues were published in 2004 before the series was cancelled.

== Creation ==
At the time of the series' creation, Austen had become a hate figure within the comics industry due his work on high-profile titles such as Uncanny X-Men and The Avengers, some of which had attracted extremely negative reviews; he even claimed to have received death threats. Austen left his role as X-Men writer shortly before the first issue of WorldWatch shipped, according to him by mutual consent. During 2004 he also left his role as writer on DC Comics' Action Comics; in interviews Austen stated that editor Eddie Berganza felt the backlash against the writer was limiting sales, and refused to work under a pseudonym. Berganza instead took over writing Action Comics himself under the pen name J.D. Finn, leading to speculation that Austen was still scripting the title.

However, instead Austen turned to independent comics, setting up his own Wild and Wooly imprint to publish his own superhero series, WorldWatch. Austen described the series as "superheroes meets The Shield", focusing on the characters as real people brought together by an occupation rather than by choice, with clashing ethics and values. He felt the series would do to superhero comics "what Deadwood did to westerns". He relished the challenge of building the WorldWatch universe from scratch, rather than working on established properties as he had done for Marvel and DC. The story was planned to focus on what Austen saw as the five primary characters – War Woman, Doc Gulliver, Sgt. Mercury, Intercessor and Tiger Princess. From the outset, Austen established that the series would be covering the lead-up to the group's downfall. While Austen conceded there were visual similarities to characters from the Avengers and the Justice League of America, he argued that their more abrasive personalities and creeds made WorldWatch a different proposition. He felt this "grayer world" was more fun to write, and would bring higher stakes to the story, feeling the superhero genre had grown stale. He listed Watchmen, The Dark Knight Returns, The Authority and Planetary as comics he had enjoyed, and hoped to produce a series that would "go places people didn't expect".

Despite being an experienced artist, an injury prevented him from drawing the series himself. Austen instead turned to Tom Derenick, who he had previously worked with on an issue of Superman and had impressed the writer with his detailed work. Allan Jacobsen, who had worked with Austen when establishing Marvel's updated Invaders series, also had input on rounding out the characters. Austen paid normal page rates to the creators, which made WorldWatch expensive to produce.

== Publication history ==
The series was planned to run for seven issues, but was cancelled after only three were published. The first was published in black-and-white before the series switched to colour from the second issue onwards. Austen felt the series needed to sell 10,000-15,000 copies to become profitable, and initially felt this was achievable given that The Eternal had sold 25,000 copies, despite the obscurity of the subject. However, sales were between 5,000 and 7,000, and Austen later admitted he underestimated the draw of the Marvel name even for unfamiliar characters – and that his poor image within the industry was hurting order numbers. While he felt that WorldWatch might have broken even if it had reached the stage where a collected edition could be made he ultimately decided to cut his losses after three issues were printed, despite WorldWatch #4 being completed and even solicited. Austen felt losses on single issues were standard for small publishers; in response he moved towards digital publishing for his next work, Like Warm Sun on Nekkid Bottoms. A colour edition of the first issue was planned and advertised in WorldWatch #3 but was cancelled along with the rest of the series.

The third issue announced that Austen was being fired and replaced by 'Sam Clemens' (a play on the real name of author Mark Twain), giving reasons similar to those he claimed Berganza had given for removing him from Action Comics. Despite the absurdity of Austen being fired from the title when he was also the publisher, Austen claimed many fans failed to pick up on it and that he had even encountered some who hadn't seen through the Clemens pseudonym.

== Premise ==
The series purports to be a comic adaptation of Exposing Myself, a tell-all memoir by Dena Warchowski – formerly the superheroine War Woman, leader of the United Nations-sanctioned superteam WorldWatch before she lost her powers. The narrative covers the period leading up to the team's downfall.

Formed by Doc Gulliver 15 years previously, within five years WorldWatch ended war and hunger on Earth, becoming heroes and celebrities in the process. However supervillains continue to appear and the world has not become a better place in the following decade. The team are wracked with internal conflict due to a complicated web of sexual histories and a brewing power struggle between War Woman's code against killing enemies and a growing faction led by Intercessor that believe they should be aiming to kill villains. War Woman must also deal with the emergence of new hero Monarch's pursuit of her affections. When not in the field the team inhabit a base in Earth orbit where they drink, have sex and argue.

== Characters ==
- War Woman: the team's leader and the series' narrator, War Woman has super-strength. She initially hides her roots by using the name Dena Chambers and claiming to be a native of the AmaZone. Instead she was an archaeology student called Dena Warchowski who found an enchanted sword and shield that granted her super-strength and enhanced speed, with the AmaZone backstory invented by a publicist. While her tiara keeps her young it is permanently fixed to her skull. Her insistence at not killing villains is partly fuelled by her having an affair with adversary Pharaoh. Dena wears an intentionally revealing costume as she loves to be admired.
- Doc Gulliver: the founder of WorldWatch, Samuel Lawrence was a boy genius who devised a way of collapsing molecules for a shipping company. Exposure to the formula gave him the ability to grow or shrink at will. After a successful vigilante career Lawrence hit upon pooling his abilities with other individuals, a plan he took to the UN which led to the creation of WorldWatch. He was initially in a relationship with Tiger Princess and was responsible for giving her powers but her preference for voyeurism and his for much younger women led to their breakup. He begins a relationship with Sergeant Mercury shortly after she joins the team.
- Omnia: possessing enhanced speed, strength, heat vision and a love of partying, the beautiful Omnia's only significant weakness is a blind spot for bad boys that leads her into a succession of damaging relationships, which would usually leave her carrying out a therapeutic wave of mass destruction when they inevitably fall apart.
- Qabbala: Master of Magick and Incantation and a disciple of Aphrotet, the only limit to Qabbala's powers is that he cannot act without the permission of the Masters of the Tree of Life, whose criteria for allowing to do so appear to be largely arbitrary. As such when not able to use his powers he writes comics as a side-line.
- Sergeant Mercury: Savannah Sentry was a truck driver who got covered with liquid metal and other substances in an industrial accident, giving her nearly-impenetrable metal skin, super speed and "hot metal" powers. Naïve and 21, Mercury starts a trend and becomes hugely popular when she begins performing missions topless after her costume continually tears during battle. She later begins a relationship with Doc Gulliver, largely due to the thrill of an interracial relationship being contrary to her conservative upbringing.
- Tiger Princess: girlfriend of Doc Gulliver at the founding of WorldWatch, Wanda Nehu was given cat-like abilities including night vision, though there are rumours that she did not give permission for him to experiment on her. The pair broke up but remain on broadly cordial terms. She initially had an exhibitionist streak and went through a spell of carrying out missions wearing only a mask until the team censured her. Wanda instead finds thrills in voyeurism, watching camera feeds of her teammates' various couplings.
- HighLord: descended from Greek Gods, HighLord is serving penance for his sins and may only occupy the mortal plain for 72 minutes. As such he is bonded to orphan Jason Jefferson, with whom he swaps places when the latter calls out the magic word "Ramrod". Their connection is not by Jefferson's choice; while HighLord is openly homosexual and uses any of his 72 minutes left to find men, Jefferson is a homophobe and greatly dislikes the sights and thoughts his alter ego brings him into contact with.
- Satyr: a hard-fighting, hard-drinking and hard-loving satyr by the name of Randy. His origins are unknown; the rest of the team believed him to be wearing a costume until an encounter with a villain left the entire team naked and Satyr unchanged. He is in a sexual relationship with Omnia, and their loud love-making is the bane of fellow members.
- Intercessor: a Fundamental Christian with the power of flight from angelic wings and the ability to hear anyone who prays to him. Despite being a fervent advocate of pro-life he strongly advocates that WorldWatch should use lethal force against their foes, with growing support from both his team-mates and the public. Intercessor also indoctrinates many of the women he saves into a sex cult devoted to him.
- Monarch: a young up-and-coming superhero with an interest in the WorldWatch since a young age. He attempts to join the group, also pursuing War Woman romantically. After he saves her from being brutally raped by the villain Atomika she consents to a date with him and the pair nearly kiss before being discovered by Pharaoh. However Dena describes him in withering terms such as "starfucker" in Exposing Myself, noting that he left her after she lost her powers.
- Pharaoh: the villainous alter-ego of wealthy industrialist and philanthropist Rex Farrow. War Woman begins dating Farrow and eventually deduces his double life but Dena is unable to end their relationship due to her attraction to him and her belief she could change him.
- Steelskull: Once one of HighLord's conquests, Harlan is driven insane by the latter treating him as a one-night stand. He made himself a huge suit of armour and butchered numerous homosexual men after coming into possession of the power-boosting Chaos Sphere. He deduces HighLord's double identity and targets Jason. However, after Sergeant Mercury is able to snatch the Sphere from him HighLord rips off one of Steelskull's arms. The villain then attempts to murder-suicide HighLord with a nuclear bomb; however, the hero is saved by the arrival of Monarch.
- Atomika: a persistent American villain whose destructive attacks are the reason the USA is willing to put funding towards WorldWatch. A scientist who discovered a way to turn himself into a huge red behemoth, Atomika has fought WorldWatch on numerous occasions and has proved impossible to rehabilitate due to having no goals or motivation beyond wanting to destroy and kill. He later adds rape to his rampages and even overpowers War Woman with this in mind; however, she is saved by Monarch.

== Reception ==
WorldWatch has received negative reviews. Yahoo! News called the series "a late-night Cinemax version of the Justice League" In a 2012 retrospective of Austen's career, Chris Sims of ComicsAlliance described the series as "terrible", and felt only the fake-firing of Austen stood out as notable, and that even that was "weird".

David Charles Bitterbaum covered the first issue as part of his Tales from the Dollar Bin series of reviews for The Newest Rant in 2017, comparing it negatively with other revisionist superhero comics of the period such as The Authority, The Ultimates and The Boys, feeling that the heavy-handed writing was "trying too hard" and that Austen missed the majority of his satirical targets as a result. He did, however, compliment the artwork.
