= Will Jacobs =

American comics and humor writer (born 1955)

Will Jacobs (born 1955) is an American comics and humor writer. He was co-author with Gerard Jones on The Beaver Papers, The Comic Book Heroes, and the comic book The Trouble with Girls (1987–1993). He was a contributor to National Lampoon magazine and various DC Comics.

From 1984 to 1986, Jacobs and his writing partner Gerard Jones wrote articles about the Silver Age of Comics for the hobbyist publication Comics Feature. From 1983 to 1988, Jones and Jacobs were contributors to National Lampoon magazine. In 1984, the pair published The Beaver Papers (Crown Publishers, 1984), a book parodying the TV series Leave It to Beaver. And in 1985, they wrote The Comic Book Heroes, a book dedicated to the history of the American comic book industry from the Silver Age to the present.

Jacobs left professional writing in the 1990s to start a used and antiquarian book service, Avalon Books.

He and Jones returned to humorous fiction in 2014 with The Beaver Papers 2 (Atomic Drop Press) and My Pal Splendid Man (Atomic Drop Press, 2015).

== Bibliography ==
- (with Gerard Jones) The Beaver Papers: The Story of the Lost Season (Crown Publishers, 1984, ISBN 978-0-517-54991-9)
- (with Gerard Jones) The Comic Book Heroes: The First History of Modern Comic Books – From the Silver Age to the Present (Crown Publishing Group 1985, 1996 – revised edition – ISBN 0-517-55440-2)
- (with Gerard Jones and Tim Hamilton) The Trouble with Girls Malibu Comics, 1987)
- (with Gerard Jones) The Beaver Papers 2: The Fall of the Beaver (Atomic Drop Press, 2014, ISBN 978-0982766989)
- (with Gerard Jones) My Pal Splendid Man (Atomic Drop Press, 2015, ISBN 978-0996525916)

== See also ==
- Tim Hamilton (illustrator)
