= The Trouble with Girls (comics) =

Comic book series written by Will Jacobs and Gerard Jones

- The cover of The Trouble with Girls trade paperback, published in 2006 by Checker Book Publishing Group.

Publication information
- Publisher: Eternity Comics/Malibu Comics (1987–1988, 1989–1991); Comico (1989); Epic Comics (1993); Devil's Due Digital (2010)
- Publication date: August 1987 – 1993
- No. of issues: 39

Creative team
- Created by: Will Jacobs; Gerard Jones
- Written by: Will Jacobs; Gerard Jones
- Artist(s): Tim Hamilton; Dave Garcia; Chuck Austen; Bret Blevins; Al Williamson

Collected editions
- The Trouble with Girls: Volume 1: ISBN 1-933160-45-4
- The Trouble with Girls: Volume 2: ISBN 1-933160-46-2

The Trouble with Girls is an American comic book published serially from 1987–1993 by Malibu Comics/Eternity Comics, Comico, and Marvel Comics/Epic Comics. It was written by Will Jacobs and Gerard Jones, and drawn by Tim Hamilton and others.

The Trouble with Girls is a satirical action series starring Lester Girls, who wants to be simply an "average guy" with a dead-end job, a plain wife, and no adventures more exciting than a good night's sleep, but Lester can't go for a drive without terrorists launching missiles at him, or walk into one of his many mansions without a beautiful, talented, curvaceous woman reposing half-dressed on his bed. Wealth, adventure, sexual magnetism, dashing good looks, and the savoir faire of a Hollywood action hero are what he calls "the curse of Girls".

== Publication history ==
Malibu Comics published volume one (#1–14 and Annual #1) in 1987 and 1988, the first six issues under its "Malibu Comics" imprint, and the remainder under its Eternity Comics imprint.

In 1989, Comico launched volume two (#1–4), which then returned to Malibu and the "Eternity" imprint for issues #5–23 and a Christmas Special. During this run, Malibu also brought out related Lester Girls, Apache Dick, Lizard Lady, and Classic Girls (reprinting v1 #1–4) miniseries.

In 1993, Marvel's Epic Comics imprint revived the series under its adult-oriented Heavy Hitters branding. There, Epic published a four-issue Trouble with Girls miniseries called The Trouble With Girls: Night of the Lizard, with art by Bret Blevins and Al Williamson, as well as a Lester Girls short story in Heavy Hitters Annual.

== Collected editions ==
The first fourteen issues of The Trouble with Girls were reissued in two volumes by Checker Book Publishing Group in 2006. Currently, The Trouble with Girls is available digitally exclusively through Devil's Due Digital.
