= Tripping the Rift =

Television series

- Series title card
- Created by: Chris Moeller; Chuck Austen
- Directed by: Bernie Denk; Jon Minnis
- Starring: Stephen Root; Carmen Electra; Maurice LaMarche; Jenny McCarthy; Gina Gershon
- Composer: Mario Sévigny
- Countries of origin: United States; Canada
- Original language: English
- No. of seasons: 3
- No. of episodes: 39

Production
- Executive producers: Jacques Pettigrew; Michel Lemire; John Hyde
- Producer: Andrew Makarewicz
- Running time: 20 minutes
- Production companies: CinéGroupe; Film Roman

Original release
- Network: Sci Fi Channel; Space; Teletoon (season 3)
- Release: March 4, 2004 – December 13, 2007

Tripping the Rift is an adult CGI science fiction comedy television series. It is based on two short animations published on the internet by Chris Moeller and Chuck Austen. The series was produced by CinéGroupe in association with Sci Fi Channel. Following its cancellation by that cable network, CinéGroupe continued producing the series for the other North American and international broadcasters. The series aired on the Canadian speciality channel Space in 2004 and Teletoon in August 2006. Teletoon participated in the production of the third season, and aired it in 2007. A feature-length movie version was released on DVD in 2008.

== Setting ==
The universe is modeled largely after the Star Trek universe, with references to "warp drive" and "transporter" beam technology, occasional time travel, the Federation and the Vulcans. The series also includes elements borrowed from other sources such as Star Wars, 2001: A Space Odyssey and Battlestar Galactica.

Known space is politically divided between two superpowers: the Confederation (led by humans, and a parody of the Federation from Star Trek) and the Dark Clown Empire (a parody of the Galactic Empire from Star Wars). The Dark Clown Empire is a totalitarian, tyrannical police state, led by Darph Bobo. In contrast, the Confederation is a democratic society, but is dominated by mega-corporations and bloated bureaucracies. Ultimately, both superpowers end up exploiting and restricting their inhabitants, albeit in different ways. For example, the value placed on life is so commercialized in the Confederation that sentient robots and androids are reduced to essentially slave-status. The Dark Clown Empire practices actual slavery, and while the Confederation does not, most of its inhabitants live in wage slavery. The only place that anyone can be completely free is in the border region between the two superpowers, which is directly controlled by neither. This borderland is known as "the Rift", with the outlaws operating there said to be "Tripping the Rift". The series follows a group of outlaws led by Chode aboard the spaceship Jupiter 42, taking odd-jobs and usually pursuing various get-rich-quick schemes.

== Characters ==
- Chode McBlob (voiced by Stephen Root) — The captain of the ship. Chode is a purple, three-eyed alien who is described as a street-savvy scoundrel and sex hound. He typically gets his crew to do what he wants through manipulation and threats. Chode is selfish and driven by sex, money, and food. Chode's twin brother, Philbrick, is the king of planet Moldavia 5.
- Six of One (voiced by Patricia Beckmann and Terry Farrell in the pilot (two versions), Gina Gershon in season 1, Carmen Electra in season 2 and Jenny McCarthy in season 3) — The ship's science officer. Six is an intelligent gynoid who was designed as a sex robot, but was given a conscience and a sense of decency thanks to a programming upgrade by Chode. Six's name is a play on the Star Trek: Voyager character Seven of Nine and the phrase "six of one, half a dozen of the other."
- T'Nuk Layor (voiced by Gayle Garfinkle) — T'Nuk is an ill-tempered pilot and cook with a centaur-like body shape. While most of the other characters consider her as grotesquely unattractive as she is unpleasant, she is considered attractive on her home planet. She was chosen as the pilot because she is skilled at keeping the Spaceship Bob in check.
- Whip (voiced by Rick Jones) — Whip is a green, teenage reptilian and Chode's nephew. He serves as the ship's foreman, though he is rarely seen working and prefers to slack off. He is typically impulsive.
- Gus (voiced by Chris Moeller in the pilot, Maurice LaMarche in the series) — Gus is Chode's robot servant. He is the ship's engineer and is implied to be homosexual. Though smarter than those around him, he is forced to serve them, as silicon-based organisms like him do not have the same rights as carbon-based life. He has a cynical and sarcastic attitude, resulting from the many failures he has experienced due to his less intelligent carbon-based bosses' actions. His appearance and voice is a parody of C-3PO.
- Spaceship Bob (voiced by John Melendez) — Bob is an A.I. that controls the spacecraft Jupiter 42. He has agoraphobia, and often has panic attacks at inconvenient times. Bob is a parody of 2001: A Space Odyssey's Hal 9000.
- Darph Bobo (voiced by Chris Moeller in the pilot, Terrence Scammell in the series) — Darph Bobo is the supreme leader of the Dark Clown Empire. He wants to take over the universe because he was teased as a child (mostly by Chode). He attended high school with Chode, and the two also spent time in prison together. He has a belittling wife, Bernice, and two daughters, the teenager Babette and an unnamed younger child. His appearance and name are a parody of the Darths from the Star Wars franchise, as is his desire to construct a "Death Orb", a deadly battle station, which is a parody of the Death Star.
- Captain Adam Francis Shatner — Shatner is the captain of a Confederation ship. He has a domineering wife, Nancy, and a cloned son named Adam 12. He has been known to blackmail Chode into doing his dirty work. Shatner is named after William Shatner, while his halting and exaggerated speech pattern is a parody of Shatner's character, James T. Kirk, from Star Trek.

== Production and development ==
In 1997, Chris Moeller, who was working on the animated TV series King of the Hill and who had been producing animation shorts with Dark Bunny Productions, met Chuck Austen and pitched their idea for a science fiction comedy to animation studio Film Roman. In early 1998, they launched the first pilot Love and Darph on the internet. The Chode character first appeared in the 1994 short, Wisconsin. In 2001, Film Roman released the Oh Brother teaser for episode 2, and Chris claimed the full version was made, but its release was left up to Film Roman.

In 2002, CinéGroupe acquired the rights to the five-minute short Love and Darph and approached animator Bernie Denk to direct the series, which was produced in association with Sci Fi US. Bernie Denk's team worked in Montreal on preproduction (character design, modeling and textures) while the Malaysian studio Shanghai Cartoon worked on animation using Autodesk 3ds Max software, lighting and compositing. Keyframe animation was chosen for its quality and animating control capabilities.

== Episodes ==
=== Pilots ===
- "Love and Darph" (1998) (two versions with differing dialogue and voice actresses for Six)
- "Oh Brother" (Teaser) (2001)

=== Season 1 (2004) ===
1. 03/04/2004 "God Is Our Pilot" — Chode and Gus hijack a time-traveling vacation ship to the dawn of time, and accidentally kill God, causing a reality where impossible things happen because of God's death.
2. 03/11/2004 "Mutilation Ball" — The Federation will drop all charges against Chode if he can bring in Malik, a retired Mutilation Ball player for one last game...and things get complicated when T'nuk has sex with Malik and discovers that he's a robot while the real Malik has become a bloated mess who is being exploited by his wife.
3. 03/18/2004 "Miss Galaxy 5000" — Chode enters Six (who despises beauty pageants because of how sexist and demeaning they are to women) in a beauty contest against the daughter of his archenemy, Darph Bobo. Meanwhile, Gus trains T'nuk (who also despises beauty pageants because they advocate a cookie-cutter standard of beauty and don't recognize that creatures like her can be beautiful) to be a beauty pageant contestant.
4. 03/25/2004 "Sidewalk Soiler" — Chode is set to be executed for spitting gum on a planet where littering is punishable by death.
5. 04/01/2004 "The Devil and a Guy Named Webster" — Chode sells his soul to the Devil to avoid a catastrophe and his only hope is Emmanuel Lewis (TV's Webster) as his lawyer.
6. 04/08/2004 "Totally Recalled" — Gus's model has been recalled while Chode gets a visit from his grandfather.
7. 04/15/2004 "2001 Space Idiocies" — Chode is suckered into a scheme by Darph Bobo to corrupt a planet of primitives.
8. 04/22/2004 "Power to the Peephole" — The crew arrive on planet Floridia 7 in the middle of the Dark Clown Confederation's presidential election. Chode is chosen to get dirt on the Dark Clown Federation's candidate, George Goodfellow, who brainwashes Six into being his love slave. Meanwhile, T'nuk tries to trick Goodfellow into sexually harassing her so she can get famous.
9. 05/06/2004 "Nature vs. Nurture" — Chode trades places with his long lost twin brother, the king of Muldavia 5.
10. 05/13/2004 "Aliens, Guns, & A Monkey" — On the way to deliver a monkey diamond, the crew get stuck on a planet where everyone carries a gun.
11. 05/20/2004 "Emasculating Chode" — Darph Bobo kidnaps Whip (who feels like he's being treated like a child) and severs one of Chode's tentacles, which causes Chode to have a crisis over his masculinity.
12. 05/27/2004 "Love Conquers All...Almost" — Chode plays matchmaker to the children of his mortal enemies (Darph Bobo's daughter, Babette, and Commander Adam's son, Adam-12) to get money to repay a huge debt.
13. 06/03/2004 "Android Love" — Six comes across an old boyfriend working in a male strip club.

=== Season 2 (2005) ===
1. 07/27/2005 "Cool Whip" — Whip becomes famous on a planet after accidentally taking control of the ship.
2. 07/27/2005 "You Wanna Put That Where?" — Chode and company try to sell off cases of personal lubricant on a planet where gay men and lesbians are the majority while heterosexuals are discriminated against for their sexual preference.
3. 08/03/2005 "Honey, I Shrunk the Crew" — Darph Bobo gets back at Chode for pilfering his credit card by commandeering Bob the spaceship and turning him into Bobo's nagging wife, Bernice. While T'nuk and Six stay on the ship to reset the operating system, Chode, Whip, and Gus shrink down and go inside Bobo's body to get access to his brain.
4. 08/10/2005 "Ghost Ship" — After running out of fuel, the crew must face their greatest fears on a ghost ship.
5. 08/17/2005 "Benito's Revenge" — Chode's grandfather is caught up in one of Darph Bobo's schemes.
6. 08/24/2005 "All for None" — Chode's crew quits after Chode refuses to give into their demands for better amenities. While Chode remedies this by hiring illegal immigrant space aliens, the rest of the crew are hired to work on a pleasure cruise that turns out to be part of a wage slave trade.
7. 08/31/2005 "Extreme Chode" — Chode bets Commander Adam that Whip can beat Adam's son, Adam 12, in a spaceboarding competition at the Intergalactic X-Games.
8. 09/14/2005 "Roswell" — Chode flies the ship through a time warp to escape from two Grey Alien scam artists, who are piloting a flying saucer. Both ships are sent back to 1947, where they crash land in Roswell on Earth.
9. 09/21/2005 "Santa Clownza": Chode takes the crew to his favorite getaway on Gulibus 4, a planet offering half-price suites, buffets, and prostitutes. But when they arrive, the hotel is booked up, the buffet is sold out, and Chode quickly realizes his trip has been ruined by "Santa Clownza", a bogus, commercialized holiday devised by Darph Bobo.
10. 09/28/2005 "Chode and Bobo's High School Reunion": Chode goes to his high school reunion, where Darph Bobo has to face his former bully (Chode) and T'nuk reunites with her mean girl friends (who broke out of prison to make it).
11. 10/05/2005 "Creaturepalooza": Commander Adam crash-lands on the planet Vitalius 4, and Adam's wife, Nancy, forces Chode to find him.
12. 10/12/2005 "Chode's Near-Death Experience": When a near death experience brings him face-to-face with the devil, Chode vows to change his vile ways.
13. 10/19/2005 "Six, Lies and Videotape": Disguised as a beefy prison guard, T'Nuk plots to break Six out of the jail after the sexy cyborg is thrown into the slammer on an unidentified charge. But in a case of mistaken identity, T'Nuk escapes with her friend's identical visitor, Haffa Dozen, the career stripper that was the inspiration for Six's design.

=== Season 3 (2007) ===
1. 09/06/2007 "Chode Eraser": Angry that Babette had sex with Chode and may be carrying his baby, Darph Bobo sends a Terminator-style hitman back to the past to prevent Babette and Chode from hooking up.
2. 09/13/2007 "Skankenstein": The Prime Minister of Slovenia plans to kill the country's princess to take control. For his coup to work, he hires Chode and the crew to divert suspicion away from him.
3. 09/20/2007 "To eBay or Not to eBay": After a night at a virtual casino, Chode tries to solve the mystery of who sold Bob the spaceship's parts and why.
4. 10/11/2007 "23 1/2": In this spoof of 24 and Snakes on a Plane, Darph Bobo kidnaps Six and tells Bobo that the only way to get her back is to finally kill Commander Adam and deal with a plane full of venomous snakes as it careens into the desert.
5. 10/18/2007 "Chuckles Bites the Dust": Chode's grandfather, Benito, is asked to speak at his enemy's funeral.
6. 10/25/2007 "The Need for Greed": Six inherits her creator's fortune and learns what it means to be greedy and power-hungry.
7. 11/01/2007 "Hollow Chode": Chode is cursed by a carnival fortune teller into becoming invisible. While the rest of the crew try to break the curse, Chode ends up in the amorous arms of Bernice, who thinks Chode is the ghost who sexually satisfied her better than Darph Bobo ever could.
8. 11/08/2007 "Raiders of the Lost Crock of */@?#!": On planet Pyritia, Chode and Gus obtain a medallion that will supposedly lead them to a treasure beyond their wildest dreams. The treasure is a hoax fabricated by the villainous Pyritians, who enslave them and force them to search for the actual key to the treasure. It's up to Chode's cunning and Gus' metal to get them out of another tight spot.
9. 11/15/2007 "Witness Protection": Chode is put into witness protection after Darph Bobo threatens to kill him days before Chode can testify against him.
10. 11/22/2007 "The Son Also Rises": Chode reluctantly becomes the caregiver to his son, who he was previously unaware of.
11. 11/29/2007 "Extreme Take-Over": To win the prestigious "Flaming Colossus Space Race", Chode juices up the Jupiter 42, which alters Bob the spaceship's personality.
12. 12/06/2007 "Battle of the Bulge": Chode's attempt to revitalize his waning libido leads to a space phenomenon that may mean the end of all life in the universe.
13. 12/13/2007 "Tragically Whip": The crew go to a vacation island, where Chode, T'nuk, and Six are brainwashed into proselytizing at the airport, Gus tries to snap them out of it, and Whip lives out the drug- and alcohol-fueled adolescence he never got to experience.

== Broadcast ==
The show aired on Space in Canada and the Sci Fi Channel in the United States in March 2004. Sky One began airing the show in the United Kingdom in early 2005. Space and the Sci Fi Channel aired the second season in the fall of 2005. In Australia, the show appears on the Sci Fi Channel.

In Latin America, it appeared on Adult Swim. In Russia, a music television channel Muz TV aired season 1 & 2 in 2007, and season 3 in early 2008. Later it aired on channel 2x2. In Germany, DMAX showed season 1 & 2 starting in March 2009. In Bulgaria, PRO BG aired season 1 & 2 starting in September 2009, and season 3 in October 2009. Other major territories include France, Italy, Belgium, Portugal, Sweden, Spain, and Central-Eastern Europe (Poland, Czech Republic, Hungary, and Romania).

Re-runs of the show aired in Canada on SPACE. In 2006, the series was picked up for rebroadcast on Razer and The Comedy Network.

== Tripping the Rift: The Movie ==
Anchor Bay released the 75-minute unrated Tripping the Rift: The Movie on DVD on March 25, 2008. The story revolves around Chode's birthday party and the events that occur during and after it, all of which prompt Darph Bobo to dispatch a time-traveling killer clown android to assassinate Chode.

The film consists of footage from the season three episodes "Chode Eraser", "Skankenstein", "Raiders of the Lost Crock of *@#?!", and "Witness Protection", with added original footage stitching them together into a loosely cohesive whole.

While the film was promoted as uncensored, only dialogue was left uncensored, with nudity still obscured by "censored" balloons.

The main DVD extra is "Captain's Log: Making of Tripping the Rift: The Movie". A Best Buy exclusive featured a second DVD with three episodes of the series centered on Six.

== See also ==
- List of science fiction television programs
