= Boys of Summer (comics) =

Original English-language manga series

- Cover of Boys of Summer vol. 1 (2007), art by Hiroki Otsuka
- Genre: Romantic comedy, sport
- Author: Chuck Austen
- Illustrator: Hiroki Otsuka
- Publisher: Tokyopop (U.S.)
- Other publishers: Mangattack (Hungary)
- Original run: 2007–2008
- Volumes: 3

Boys of Summer is a three volume original English-language manga written by American Chuck Austen and illustrated by Japanese artist Hiroki Otsuka. It is a romantic comedy that deals with the main character's relationships with women upon his arrival at college as well as his relationship with the school's baseball team. The series is published by Tokyopop and is rated as suitable for persons over the age of 16, as it contains scenes with partial nudity.

== Publication history ==
The first volume of Boys of Summer was released May 9, 2006, running approximately 200 pages, and is the only volume that has seen print in the US. The second volume was released in October 2007 in Hungary. An omnibus edition, collecting all three volumes, was announced but never released.

In August 2009, Tokyopop announced that the remaining volumes would be released online, as part of their new online manga program. On September 23, 2009, the serialization of the second volume started on Tokyopop.com, with a new chapter scheduled each Wednesday.

== Synopsis ==
=== Volume 1 ===
Bud Waterston is an 18-year-old male "in full hormonal bloom" with a predilection for nosebleeds. After saying goodbye to his mother and siblings he leaves to attend Wilton State University two hours away with his best friend Manny. Bud is looking forward to meeting what he imagines are legions of scantily-clad young women but things do not begin well for him. Upon arrival he gets into a car accident and runs afoul of an upperclassman. When taking Manny to baseball tryouts, he discovers that the car he ran into is owned by the manager of the baseball team, and that the upperclassman, Jake, is the star pitcher. An altercation with Jake reveals that Bud possesses a high speed fastball with great control, and soon after Bud meets the manager's daughter and the team's starting catcher, Chrissie.

Later, Chrissie approaches Manny to find out more about Bud—namely why he does not play baseball with his incredible skills. Later she finds him at a party thrown by Keeley, a sophomore girl living in his co-ed dorm. Finding Keeley in Bud's lap, she storms off and Bud follows arguing with her only to discover she lives across the hall from him. Afterwards Keeley appears and apologizes to Bud wondering if he and Chrissie are involved. Bud denies it and Keeley expresses an interest in Bud.

The next day Bud and Chrissie are heading down to breakfast together when they discover that Manny has not activated his dining card—meaning he cannot enter the cafeteria. Bud gives Manny his card and resigns himself to skipping breakfast but Chrissie volunteers to buy him something elsewhere and the two of them leave. While eating they talk and eventually the talk turns to baseball when Bud suddenly realizes that Chrissie is only being nice to him to get him to join the team and leaves insulted.

That evening Chrissie's father comes to Bud's dorm and offers not to report the damage Bud caused to his car in return for his joining the team. At first Bud resists but after discovering that Manny, also a catcher, probably will not make the team due to Chrissie and calling his mother and finding out the projected rise in the insurance premiums, he shows up to practice on one condition: only Manny can catch for him.

== Characters ==
- Bud Waterston: The main character, Bud is a horny, perverted teenage boy who is a very loyal friend to Manny. He also has an incredible gift as a pitcher—able to throw a fastball accurately at 100 mph—but refuses to play baseball because of the suicide of his father. When dealing with Bud the Japanese convention of nosebleeds as signaling sexual arousal is turned on its head—while his nose does bleed around Chrissie, it is always the result of blunt trauma (e.g. hit in face by a baseball, running into a door, etc.). In addition he usually seems to lose his temper quite easily around her.
- Manny: Best friends with Bud since childhood, Manny used to be Bud's primary catcher until Bud quit baseball. He is stockier than Bud, and there is a running joke about his love of food. He is also something of a mama's boy in that he often speaks with his mother on the phone for long periods even if she is the one that calls him. Despite this he always sticks up for Bud and backs up his friend.
- Chrissie: Starting catcher of the Wilton State baseball team and at least a year older than Bud, Chrissie does not need her relationship as the manager's daughter to ensure her position—she is an excellent catcher. She began playing baseball to spend more time with her father but eventually developed a love for it. A little uptight in regards to the popularity of "oversexed" girls like Keeley, the romantic relationship between Chrissie and Bud seems like it will be a central focus of the series.
- Jake: The star pitcher (until Bud) of the team, Jake is cocky and arrogant and likes to shove Bud around. He even tries to bully the manager of the team because he is the only player who is considered above average.
- Keeley: A sophomore who lives in the same building as Bud and Chrissie, Chrissie considers Keeley a "skeevy, oversexed tramp". Nevertheless, she is adept enough in her studies to get into upper division classes in only her second year. After teasing Bud at her party, she expresses a genuine interest in his relationship with Chrissie and is glad to find out Bud is single.
- Chrissie's father: The manager (referred to as coach in the manga) of the Wilton State University baseball team, he wants his players to have fun because if they are playing for Wilton State, then "no worthwhile scout or college was interested in you." Even so, he goes to great lengths to get Bud on his team from having Chrissie talk to him to offering to forgo the damages to his car.
