= Gerard Jones =

American author and comic book writer (born 1957)

- Born: July 10, 1957 (age 69); Cut Bank, Montana, U.S.
- Occupation: Writer
- Writing career
- Genres: Superhero comics scripting, non-fiction
- Notable works: The Comic Book Heroes; Men of Tomorrow: Geeks, Gangsters, and the Birth of the Comic Book; Prime
- Notable awards: Eisner Award (2005)
- Website: gerardjones.blogspot.com

Gerard Jones (born July 10, 1957) is an American writer and convicted felon known primarily for his non-fiction work about American entertainment media, and his comic book scripting, which includes co-creating the superhero Prime for Malibu Comics, and writing for the Green Lantern and Justice League lines for DC Comics.

In 2018, Jones was convicted of possession of child pornography and sentenced to six years in prison. He was released in December 2022.

== Early life ==
Jones was born in Cut Bank, Montana, and raised in the California towns of Los Gatos and Gilroy.

== Career ==
From 1983 to 1988, Jones and his writing partner Will Jacobs were contributors to National Lampoon magazine. From 1984 to 1986, Jones and Jacobs wrote articles about the Silver Age of Comics for the hobbyist publication Comics Feature. They also wrote The Beaver Papers – a book parodying the TV series Leave It to Beaver – and The Comic Book Heroes: From the Silver Age to the Present. He and Jacobs returned to humorous fiction in 2014 with The Beaver Papers 2 and My Pal Splendid Man.

From 1987 to 2001, Jones wrote comic books for Marvel Comics, DC Comics, Dark Horse Comics, Viz Media, Malibu Comics, and other publishers, including series such as Green Lantern, Justice League, Prime, Ultraforce, El Diablo, Wonder Man, Martian Manhunter, Elongated Man, The Shadow, Pokémon Adventures, Dragon Ball, Batman, and – with Jacobs – The Trouble with Girls.

Since 1993, Jones has written primarily non-fiction books, mainly concerning American culture and media, including television comedy (Honey I'm Home), violence in entertainment (Killing Monsters), and comic-book history (Men of Tomorrow). He appears in documentaries, including Look, Up in the Sky: The Amazing Story of Superman, American Masters: Lucille Ball, and Make 'Em Laugh: The Funny Business of America.

== Personal life ==
The residence of Jones and his wife is in San Francisco.

=== Possession of child pornography ===
Jones was arrested in December 2016 on charges of distributing and possessing images of child sexual abuse. His lawyer first entered a plea of "not guilty", but in April 2018 Jones changed his plea to "guilty", admitting that the police had found "numerous electronic devices containing tens of thousands of images and hundreds of videos of child pornography" in his home. In August 2018, Jones was sentenced to six years in prison, followed by a five-year period of supervised release, with an unspecified amount of restitution to be paid to his victims.

Jones subsequently began writing about his experiences in prison, and about the life events that led him to commit his crimes; these writings were collected by his friends and former colleagues, and posted online.

Jones was released from prison in December 2022.

== Awards ==
- 2005 Eisner Award, Best Comics-Related Book: Men of Tomorrow: Geeks, Gangsters, and the Birth of the Comic Book

== Bibliography ==
=== Books ===
- The Beaver Papers: The Story of the Lost Season (with Will Jacobs, Crown Publishers, 1984, ISBN 978-0-517-54991-9)
- Honey I'm Home: Sitcoms Selling the American Dream (St. Martin's Griffin, 1993, ISBN 978-0-312-08810-1)
- The Comic Book Heroes: The First History of Modern Comic Books – From the Silver Age to the Present (with Will Jacobs, Crown Publishing Group 1985, 1996 – revised edition – ISBN 0-517-55440-2 )
- Killing Monsters: Why Children Need Fantasy, Superheroes and Make-Believe Violence (Basic Books, 2003, ISBN 978-0-465-03696-7)
- Men of Tomorrow: Geeks, Gangsters, and the Birth of the Comic Book (Basic Books, 2005, ISBN 978-0-465-03657-8)

=== Comics ===
- 2099 Unlimited #1–10
- Batman: Fortunate Son, DC Comics, 1999
- Batman: Jazz #1–3
- Big Prize #1-2, Eternity Comics, 1988
- Dragon Ball (English translation), Viz Media 1998–2004
- Dragon Ball Z (English translation), Viz Media, 1998–2006
- Dragon Ball: Full Color (English translation), Viz Media, 2014–current
- El Diablo, DC Comics, 1989–1991
- Elongated Man #1–4
- Freex #1–18
- Godwheel #0–3
- Green Lantern (Volume 3) #1–47, DC Comics, 1990–1993
- Green Lantern: Emerald Dawn #2–6 (With Jim Owsley, Keith Giffen, M.D. Bright and Romeo Tanghal), DC Comics, 1989–1990
- Green Lantern: Emerald Dawn II #1–6, DC Comics, 1991
- Green Lantern: Mosaic #1–18, DC Comics, 1992–1993
- Guy Gardner: Reborn #1–3
- Guy Gardner #1–10
- Hulk 2099 #1–10
- Justice League Europe #14–57, Annual #2–5
- Justice League America #0, 93–113, Annual #9
- Justice League Spectacular #1
- Martian Manhunter: American Secrets, DC Comics
- Monsters from Outer Space #1-3 (with Will Jacobs, Adventure Comics, 1992-1993)
- Oktane (with Gene Ha, Dark Horse Comics, 1996, ISBN 978-1-56971-212-2)
- Pokémon Adventures Volumes 1–14 (English translation), Viz Media, 2000–2003, 2009–2011
- Power of Prime #1–4, Malibu Comics, 1995
- Prime #1–26, Malibu Comics, 1993–1995
- Prime #1–15, Malibu Comics, 1995–1996
- Prime/Captain America #1
- Prime vs. Incredible Hulk #1
- Ranma ½ (English translation), Viz Media, 1993–2006
- The Adventures of Ford Fairlane #1-4, DC Comics,1990
- The Score #1–4 (with Mark Badger, Piranha Press, 1989–1990)
- Tommy and the Monsters #1 (with Will Jacobs, New Comics Group, 1989)
- Solitaire #1–12
- The Trouble with Girls (with Will Jacobs and Tim Hamilton, Malibu Comics, 1987)
- Ultraforce #0–6
- Wonder Man #1–29, Marvel Comics, 1991–1994

Preceded by James Owsley	Green Lantern writer 1990–1993	Succeeded by Ron Marz
Preceded by Dan Vado	Justice League America writer 1994–1996	Succeeded by n/a
Preceded by J. M. DeMatteis	Justice League Europe writer 1990–1994	Succeeded by n/a
