= Holly Gauthier-Frankel =

Canadian voice actress

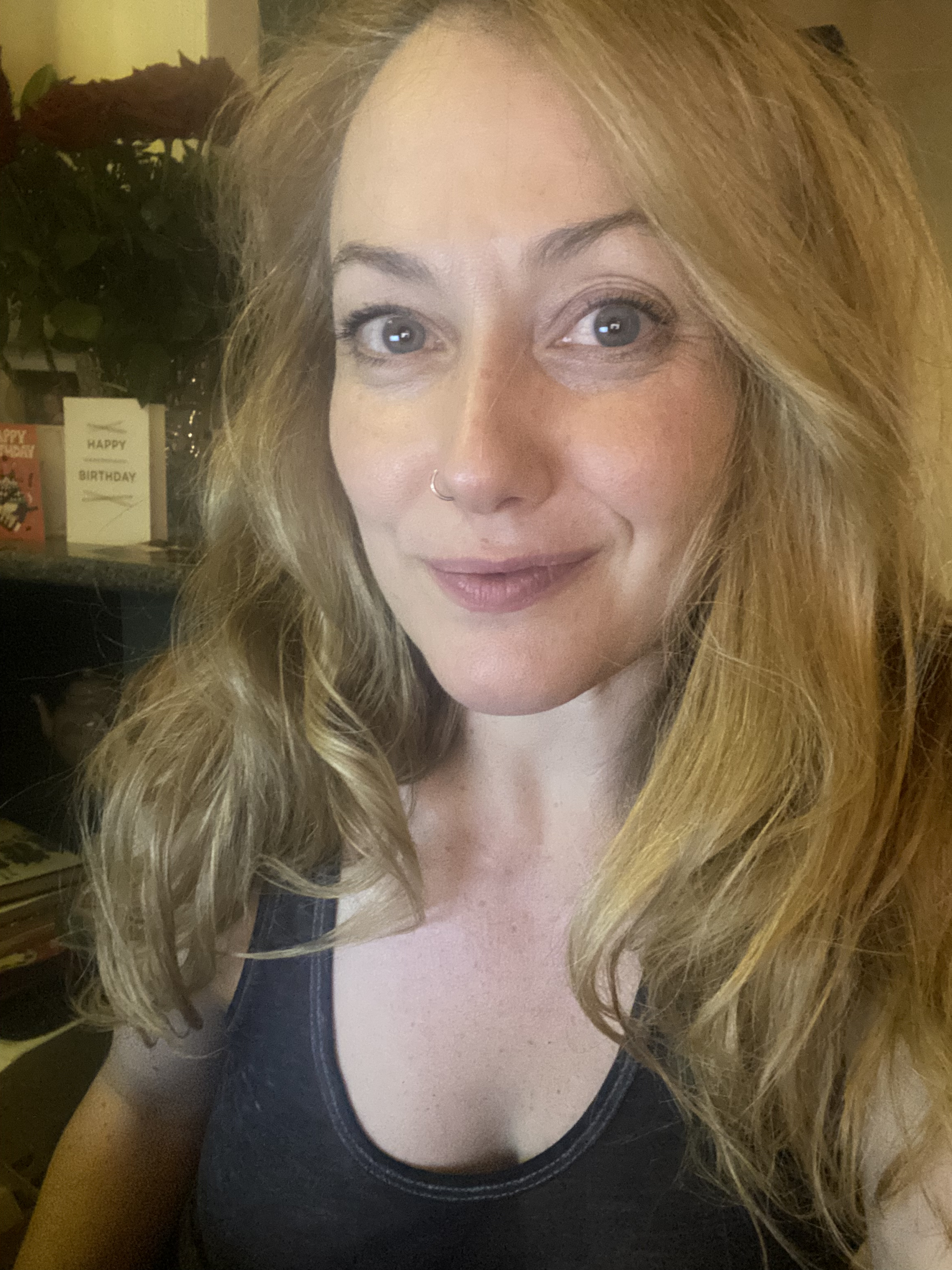
- Gauthier-Frankel in 2024
- Born: Montreal, Quebec, Canada
- Occupations: Voice actress; voice director; burlesque dancer
- Years active: 1985–present

Holly G. Frankel, also known as Holly Gauthier-Frankel, is a Canadian voice actress and voice director. Gauthier-Frankel is best known for playing Fern Walters in Arthur, Sagwa in Sagwa, the Chinese Siamese Cat, Rita in Go Hugo Go and Hugo: the Movie Star, Teri in later episodes of What's with Andy?, Loulou in Wimzie's House, and Flora and Lockette in the Cinélume English dub of Winx Club. She is also known for her alter-ego, burlesque performer Miss Sugarpuss, whom Gauthier-Frankel retired in 2016.

== Biography ==
Gauthier-Frankel is the daughter of Ron Frankel and Mary Lou Gauthier, who were former members of Malcolm Tomlinson's band Milkwood. At the age of seven, she became a voice actress after work as a studio singer for commercials. Since that time, she has been active in Montreal's neo-burlesque scene, the English theatre scene, several different musical spheres, and has continued to do voiceover, film and television work. She attended CEGEP and then McGill University. While attending the Montreal World Film Festival in 2004, she discovered burlesque.

== Filmography ==
=== Animation ===
- Fern Walters - Arthur (1996–2022) and Postcards from Buster (2004)
- Julie and DeeDee - Caillou
- Flora - Winx Club (Cinélume English dub)
- Lockette - PopPixie (Cinélume English dub)
- Belinda - Mona the Vampire
- Sagwa and Chung-nee - Sagwa, the Chinese Siamese Cat (2001-2002)
- Penelope Truehart and Jody Goodheart - Fred's Head TV series (2007–2008)
- Kala - Gummibär: The Yummy Gummy Search for Santa
- Ezekiel Zick - Monster Allergy (2005)
- Ernestine - Carrot Top (1997)
- Loulou - Wimzie's House (1995–1996)
- Teri - What's with Andy? (2001–2007)
- Rita the Fox - Jungledyret Hugo (movie series) (1993-1996)
- Sam and Yoki - Jack (2011)
- Amanda Evans, Sarry, Ritchie, Young Sam Winchester - Supernatural: The Animation (English dub) (2011)
- Hua - Shaolin Wuzang
- Rosy Barb - Fishtronaut
- Bella - Spookley the Square Pumpkin (2004)
- Judith - Milo
- Rikki Chadwick- H_{2}O: Mermaid Adventures
- Holly - ToonMarty
- Sun - Trulli Tales
- Ping - Ping and Friends
- Felix and the Treasure of Morgäa (Félix et le trésor de Morgäa)
- Kid - Three Little Ghosts

=== Video games ===
- Amelys - Laura's Happy Adventures
- Nina - Evolution Worlds
- Vladanna and Operator - Still Life
- Sharon Judd - Rainbow Six Vegas 2
- Several Voices in Splinter Cell: Conviction, Assassin's Creed II and Hype: The Time Quest
- Vocalist that covered several songs for the music game Dance on Broadway for the Wii by Ubisoft

=== Film ===
- On the Basis of Sex (2018) playing Millicent

=== Voice director ===
- Carnaval
- Just Say Yes
- Christmas Crossfire
- The Swarm
