= Fred's Head =

- From left to right: Benji, Fabienne, Blaise (Fred), Penelope, GG, and Anette.
- Genre: Comedy
- Created by: Benoît Godbout; Malorie Nault-Cousineau
- Based on: an original concept by Benoit Godbout
- Written by: Cyrille Vavsette; Jean-François Léger; Benoit Godbout; Jean-Vincent Contrafatto; Malorie Nault-Cousineau; Jean-Rémi François; Christel Gonnard; Loic Frev; Manon & Muguette Berthelet; Olivier Kemeid
- Directed by: Benoit Godbout; Sylvain Lavoie
- Voices of: Emmanuel Bilodeau; Sophie Cadieux; Guillaume Champoux; Camille Cyr-Desmarais; Nathalie Hamel-Roy; Johanne Leveille; Jacques L'Heureux; Joelle Morin; Marie-Chantal Perron; Frédéric Pierre; Benoit Rousseau; Paul Sarrazin; Catherine Trudeau; Karine Vanasse
- Opening theme: Fred's Head Theme Song by Les Trois Accords
- Ending theme: Fred's Head Theme Song (Instrumental) by Les Trois Accords
- Composer: Alexis Pecharman
- Countries of origin: Canada; France
- Original languages: French; English
- No. of seasons: 1
- No. of episodes: 26 (list of episodes)

Production
- Executive producers: Anne Evrard (Galaxy7); Luc Chatelain (Spectra Animation)
- Producer: Andre A. Belanger (Spectra Animation)
- Editor: Jean-Michel Laprise
- Running time: 22 minutes
- Production companies: Spectra Animation; Galaxy 7

Original release
- Network: Télétoon/Teletoon; France 2
- Release: October 29, 2007 – July 6, 2008

Fred's Head (Blaise le blasé, translated Blaise the Jaded) is an animated series made by Spectra Animation (now Echo Media) and Galaxy 7, and featuring Fred, a fifteen-year-old and his not-so-normal life.

The show premiered on October 29, 2007 and concluded its first season on July 6, 2008 with 26 episodes produced and aired. The French-language DVD collection was released 9 January 2012 in Europe. The show was formerly reran on Teletoon, and then it was moved to the Canadian French-language television channel, Unis, on September 1, 2014.

== Plot ==
The show is a glimpse into the life of Blaise Leblanc (named Fred Leblanc in the English dub) a 15-year-old with serious reservations about the adult world. In the courses of his adventures, a multitude of eccentric characters pull him in all directions in search of his identity: a psychotic psychologist, his odd best friend Gean-Gilbert Pirowski, an exotic lady immune to his charms, fashion trend devotees, and a horror film aficionado.

The show is noteworthy for its exploration of problems like alcohol and cheating without self-censorship.

== Characters ==
Note: While the given name of most of the characters doesn't change in the French-English port, their surnames do.

=== Leblanc family and neighbor ===
The Leblanc family live in an apartment along with other neighbors.

- Blaise Leblanc (renamed Fred Leblanc) (born on June 23, 1992) is a 15-year-old boy (who turned 16 years old in the last episode) and the main protagonist in the series who lives in an apartment with his family and neighbors. Fred goes to St Judes High School and has many friends. He plays on the St Judes basketball team, with his friends Gregory-Gilbert and Benji as well as the two biggest bullies of St Judes, Yohan and Manny. He has a great imagination and always has a sarcastic thought for any situation. He has had some love interests, the main one being Anette Freeze-Dright, however he also has had some real love partners which are Fanny Cotton and Tamara Hartman. Gregory-Gilbert and Fabienne are his main best friends. Fred always looks blasé and this causes him to be followed by the psychologist Anemone Worrynaut anywhere he goes at school. He has also shown courage at some moments. He likes to help people and can do anything to help a friend. Like many teens, he is sometimes angry, easily annoyed and frustrated at his parents who sometimes consider him immature or overprotect him. He has had some jobs, one at the Clown Shop owned by the Pyrowski Family and recently at the Café. He owns a collection of useless items that includes a lime green door, a rock (offered by GG), dwarf ears, and Fred already tried to add a cellphone-radio-razor to this collection. Fred hates parties though he organized two, a pink party and a Halloween party, each went horribly wrong. He disliked Christmas, as proven in "A Christmas Carol", but only due to getting tired of celebrating the holiday in that same episode. At the end of each episode, he tells a quote with a link to the synopsis of the episode. Sometimes other characters are part of the quote. His catchphrases are "moldy" and "I think not". At the end of the last episode, he finally succeeds to tell his love for Anette to his not-anymore-secret crush and the two end up together.
- Carol Schwartz (renamed Carol Leblanc) is Fred's mother. Of an unknown age, she sometimes overprotects her two sons, Fred and Boon Mee. As a mother, she has the habit of telling Fred all kinds of tips whenever he quits home for an unknown time. She worked a long time for seniors and takes care of Madame Butterfly, the Leblanc's elderly neighbor. She is still a mother before everything, she is considered a second mother by Gregory-Gilbert Pyrowski. She also created lots of traditions for Christmas. These include the yearly turkey, elf ears and hand-made decorations. She has a sister named Monique. A typical mother, she also has a tendency to do too much for her sons, which Paul always reminds her.
- Paul Leblanc is Fred's father. Unlike his wife, he is reserved and lets Fred experience things on his own. Carol always says that Paul gave Fred a too solid shell against real problems. He gets easily angered after the Beast. When he catches a cold, he is cured by Carol. He is also very smart, even brilliant, as depicted on the websites. A typical father.
- Boon Mee Leblanc is Fred's baby brother, adopted from Thailand. He mainly spends his time in Carol's or Paul's arms. In earlier episodes, he could only cry and giggle. Now he can say many words. He can name Fred (pronounced "Hed") and Madam Butterfly by their names. He also shows some kind of baby smartness.
- The Beast is the Leblanc family's Brown Point Oriental Shorthair cat. A defensive, hostile, hot-headed and certainly crazy cat. He is shown to be very aggressive and territorial to people he doesn't live with, which include the homeless man, GG, Penelope and Aunt Monique. He also likes to mark his territory.
- Aunt Monique is Carol's sister. Optimistic and highly Feng Shui, it has been hinted that it may be her fault if Fred is blasé. She only appeared in three episodes, 1 as a cameo and 2 in a more important role. During the Christmas special, she meets the homeless man Fred brought home for the family party. They seemed to like each other, but it is not known if it went further. Monique likes the empty space, she feels alone with her feelings when she does so. She is also an adept of unbreakable plates and primal screams. Aunt Monique doesn't live with the family but really likes to visit a lot.
- Madam Butterfly is the Leblanc family's Japanese neighbor, Madam Butterfly is looks pretty much like Fred's grandmother. Now deceased, her husband was an actor of the Kabuki theater, playing a woman. She is of an advanced age, and certainly has Alzheimer's. She frequently forgets her own apartment and almost lives in the Leblanc family's. She is kind of a part of the family, since the Beast never scratches her dress nor bites. Of a great Japanese sageness, she frequently tells quotations such as "the old foot knows the path, while the young foot gets lost on the way". She also follows many Feng Shui traditions, one of them being "no shoes on the floor". Carol is taking care of her. She also believes in spiritism and tries to talk to her dead husband. She appears once in Fred's quotes.

=== Main teens ===
- Fabienne Lajoie (renamed Fabienne Ledger) aka Fab is a horror B-movie fan who studies at St Judes High School. She lives with her parents, who are never at home. Sometimes quick-tempered, she dreams of making bloody and gory horror movies. Cynical to death, she is also independent, anarchist, atypical and short fused. She hates the Hart trio (Penelope and Jody) and Soya and constantly makes fun of them. But Fabienne doesn't truly hate Tamara since Tamara isn't annoying and ditzy like Penelope and Tamara isn't mean and arrogant like Jody either. Penelope Truehart gets on her nerves frequently. It has been hinted that she has had a relationship with Fred and that they had their first kiss together. It has also been hinted in the same joke that she is a lesbian, something that becomes clearer in the following episodes of the season (i.e., in the episode "Fred TV", she freaks out on Fred for being "intolerant" about homosexuality). She was brown haired before turning her hair color to red, and is always wearing her signature black lipstick. Her parents never take time for her, so she learned to help herself. She hates all holidays because she never spends them with her family. She discovers by herself that she is allergic to latex in the episode "So Long Worrynaut". Fabienne has one known cousin called Fatima, who was romantically involved with GG for a short period.
- Gean-Gilbert Pirowski (renamed Gregory Gilbert Pyrowski) aka GG, is Fred's official best friend who studies at St Judes High School. His family name implies that his family comes from Poland. GG is the weirdest character of the show with his unique appearance and extensive vocabulary. Round eyes and belly, strange haircut, big teeth, he is easily recognizable. GG has many dreams for his future, which he tells throughout the series: getting married, having 7 kids, breeding Labrador Retrievers, owning a central vacuum system and a powered car for his progeniture (offspring), a cottage, and many other things. His old sky-blue car is so old that it breaks anytime he drives it and by any means, a recurring inside-joke during the series. It has already hit a tree, a phone booth, and a surgery clinic. He works at the clown shop, a place owned by his family. Along with Fred, Benji, Yohan and Manny, GG plays on the St Judes basketball team. He has a dead uncle named Lazlo whose body is kept under the counter at the shop. When Fred dated Fanny Cotton, he was sure that she could replace Anette. He considers Carol Leblanc like a second mother. He won the President's underwear at the school fair. At Halloween, he disguised himself as Fred and copied his catchphrases (moldy & I think not...). GG fell in love with 4 girls so far in the series: Fatima, Fabienne's cousin, Clementine, a blasé girl, Sophie Goodheart, Jody's sister, and finally Beatrice, whom he met in Episode 5. Since none of these loves worked, he is still alone and desperately seeks the girl of his dreams, the one who will help him getting everything he ever wanted. In the episode "Blow Out Sale", he sings a song about his four loves.
- Benji Jean-Francois (renamed Benji John-Hooper) is Fred's childhood friend and studies at St Judes High School. Now a muscular and powerful teen, Fred could beat him when they were younger. He has a girlfriend, Penelope. He loves to show off his big muscles. He is also part of the school's basketball team along with Fred, GG, Yohan and Manny. He loves Penelope a lot and gives her lots of small nicknames. Also, he will answer all her wishes, might it be a giant gift or a simple snack. Benji likes everything to be "simple" and thinks Fred always makes everything sound so complicated. Benji lives with his mom in the same apartment building as Fred's family.
- Anette Frette-seck (renamed Anette Freeze-Dright) is Blaise/Fred's mysterious and enigmatic dream girl and Fabienne's best female friend. She has jet black hair, piercing eyes and a royal demeanor. Her wardrobe has a definite gothic twist. She is passionate about her art, and is often seen painting or exposing her abstract pieces or self-portraits. Since she is a very quiet and un-expressive girl in general, it is hard to know if she notices Fred's attraction for her. They had a couple of interesting encounters that generally turned out to be somewhat catastrophic. Anette's Dad is an ambassador and her mom an ex-Bollywood star. She lives in a mansion in the upper-class part of the city and is sometimes seen going to school in a limo. Every time Fred tries to help her or express his feelings, something goes wrong and Anette leaves, angry. She had one known relationship with "William Intense", a conceptual artist with pink hair. But she broke up with him after he cheated on her with Jody Goodheart. (ep: "Spills of the heart"). In the very last episode, at the end, Fred finally expresses his love for Anette without anything going wrong and it ends the season with a kiss.

=== The Hart Trio ===
- Penelope Froncoeur (renamed Penelope Truehart) is the leader of the "Hart" Trio, consisting of Penelope, Jody and Tamara, Penelope is also the dumbest and most naïve. A real airhead. She is totally in love with her "Benji-Poo" and always tries to fix Fred up with girls. Even though she always wants to be nice, she often insults people without realizing it. She lives with her mom and her stepdad. Her favorite expressions are "fizz!" and "shooty!". Penelope is also obsessed with Panouk's sexual identity.
- Tamara Vadeboncœur (renamed Tamara Hartman) may be the nicest girl of the "Hart" trio, Tamara is reserved and shy. She works at the cafe where all the teenagers hang out. Her dad is Doctor Hartman. Throughout the series, it has become clear that Tamara is in love with Fred. Later in the series, Fred works with Tamara at the café where they experience mutual attraction. Their relationship continues during four episodes but soon, Fred has to choose between Tamara and his secret crush Anette. In the episode "The analgesic of apocalypse", a hospital bound Fred writes Tamara a letter telling her about his feelings for Anette. During the following episode while nursing her heartbreak she completely changes her look, however in the most recent episodes we haven't seen this new look.
- Josee Jolicoeur (renamed Jody Goodheart) is the nastiest girl in Saint-Judes High School, Jody completes the "Hart" trio. This red haired girl is mean whenever she gets the chance, sometimes with her own friends. She is single and jealous of Penelope who goes out with the hottest guy in school. She was also extremely jealous of Tamara who dated Fred during four episodes. Jody lives with her dad and has a sister named Sophie that looks like a rock chick.

=== Minor characters ===
The less important classmates, etc.

- Soya Green She's the student with the biggest environmental conscience in St Judes. She's always eager to protest, demonstrate, rebuke and lecture each time someone so much as looks at a dandelion funny. That's why she tends to get on the nerves of some students, particularly Fabienne. She once organized a protest against Anemone Worrynaut's reforms for a "happier life" in the school. (ep: "In the Pink"). Using her journalistic experience, Soya also helped Fred trap a greedy health inspector who wanted to close down the Pyrowski's Clown Shop. (ep: "Business is Business).
- Nino O'Neil This kid is trapped in a spacesuit because he's allergic to absolutely everything in the animal and plant kingdoms, including minerals. At St Judes, he is the ultimate reject. He has a little trouble making friends because he quickly becomes very invasive. One of his goals in life is to finally kiss a girl on the lips. He almost never speaks. He once became Fred's friend, though GG was jealous of this.
- Panook Titouk The school enigma. Panook is a tall, quiet and polite teen. One of the goals of the students at Saint Judes (especially Penelope) is to find out Panook's gender identity. For most people, with Panook's androgynous appearance, they could be either a boy or a girl, but Penelope is convinced they are a girl. If anyone asks them specific questions that may determine if they are a boy or a girl, they return with a gender-neutral answer. Panook themself assumes that their gender identity is obvious to everyone, so they do not find it necessary to bring it up.
- Yohan Chabot is not very smart and spends all his time with Manny Escobar. Like his friend, Yohan is one of the biggest bullies of St Judes. He likes to play pranks, insulting Nino, rolling on his skateboard and making other extreme sports. Along with Manny, he ruins Anette's exhibit, they roll down the school's stairs on skateboard, they arrive at the pink party with masks (Spills of the heart). He actually uses big words to describe Fred in "Fred TV", but he probably didn't know what he said. It is because of them if Fred accepts a bungee jump for the basketball team. They throw Nino in the pool in the episode "The Make-Up Sausage". They also cause a lot of trouble to Fred when he becomes counselor for a skate park (Fred's Roller-Blading Daze).
- Manny Escobar is Yohan Chabot's best friend. Just like him, Manny is also one of the biggest bullies of St-Judes, is not smart, likes causing trouble around him, and they are always together, just like brothers. Fred even comes to wonder if they don't share the same brain. He participated in every prank described in Yohan Chabot's description.
- Rudolph He appears in many episodes, but episode 14 ("Fred TV") is the only one in which he has a prominent role. He is one of the players on the St-Judes basketball team who finally gets the nerve to publicly admit that he is gay after Fred "comes out of the closet" on TV. He falls for Fred, but is disappointed when he finds out Fred is not actually gay. His last name is not mentioned.
- Troy Philips An annoying teacher's pet who thinks he is better than everyone else.

=== St-Judes staff ===
- Theo Sturgeon, the principal
- Poky, Theo Sturgeon's dog
- Anemone Worrynaut, the school psychologist and the main antagonist of the series.
- Hopkins, the canary, Anemone Worrynaut's pet bird
- Viona Voula, the French teacher
- Baltasar Fairchild, the armless science teacher.
- Claude, the hairless monkey Baltasar Fairchild's monkey, also his arms and hands.
- Raouf Khandoo, the gym teacher and the coach for the St Judes Basketball Team.
- Paco Barrier the school counselor.
- Valfred the school janitor.

=== Other families ===
- The Pyrowski family Mr. Pyrowski and Mrs. Pyrowski.
- The Ledger family Mr. Ledger and Mrs. Ledger.
- The Trueheart family Mrs. Trueheart and Donald.
- The Hartman family Dr. Hartman and Mrs. Hartman.

=== Recurring characters ===
- Fanny Cotton One of the only truly villainous teenagers in the series. Although Fred has been in love with Anette for the longest time, Fanny is Fred's first ever girlfriend. She is a beautiful redhead who likes to obsessively brush her hair all the time and leaves piles of them behind wherever she goes. A new student at Saint Judes, Fanny had a crush on Fred as soon as she laid her eyes on him. In their first encounter, Fred saved Fanny from the rampaging Claude, the science teacher's pet monkey. For her, it was love at first sight. For him, it was the start of a dilemma: Continue trying to get closer to Anette, who doesn't even notice his presence, or take a chance with Fanny, who is nice and seems pretty interested. One thing led to another, and the two of them started going out. But Fred has regretted it ever since. They broke up a week after and Fanny became completely obsessive, desperate, crazy, violent, psychopathic, envious, merciless, lustful, and evil. Now, her life obsession is to get Fred back, by whatever means possible. In the episode "Within a Hair's Breath of Happiness", Fanny comes back, passing as a blond nurse, while Fred is stuck in the hospital. She has a new evil plan to get her Freddie-Poo back. In order to make him unattractive to the opposite sex, she plans on giving him the C-Baldy Bacterium that will make him lose every hair on his body. But Fabienne and GG enter Fred's hospital room just in the nick of time and a fierce battle ensues between the two girls. Fanny ends up contracting the dreaded bacterium. Now bald and confined to a padded room in a psychiatric hospital, she still believes she can get her Fred back, planning on using a new identity the next time they cross paths.

=== One-time characters ===
- Sophie Goodheart She appears in episode 17, "Half-Fried Herrings". Jody's older sister who comes to visit for the summer. GG spots her lounging by the pool at the Hart Trio's pool party. He immediately falls in love with her. Realizing this she uses it to her advantage to get a ride to her friend's cabin in Abitibi. This is the first and last episode she appears in.
- Fatima Ledger She appears in episode 8, "Spills of the Heart". She is Fabienne's cousin. GG spots her at the party and 'falls in love'. After talking GG and Fatima realize that they are the perfect couple. They each have the same passion for meat, and share the dream of marrying each other. But when she asks him to go upstairs for some pleasure, he immediately breaks up with her because he refuses any sex before marriage. She is briefly mentioned in another episode, but does not appear again.
- William Intense A conceptual artist with pink hair. He appears in episode 8, "Spills of the Heart". In which Blaise/Fred throws a party in hopes of getting a chance to hang out with Anette. But William shows up at the party as Anette's date. But Anette broke up with him after he got caught cheating on her with Josee/Jody at the party.
- Kevin He's a 'sexy' white boy Penelope Truehart briefly falls for in episode 6 "Life is a Highway".
- George Dugan actor who plays Captain Splendid.
- The Campers of "Camp Woodsy kiddy friends" Gaston-George Pyrowski, Matthew, and Juliet.
- The Squirrels Psychotic squirrels from episode 7 "Rodent Terrors". After one squirrel eats a peanut, like an epidemic they all go rabid. And they end up attacking St Judes. At the end of the episode they are stopped by being buried alive and are presumed dead. But before the screen went dark one stuck its paw up out of the dirt. So maybe we'll see them again.
- The homeless man an unnamed character who appears in the episode A Christmas Carol.
- Mr. Julian owner of the Coffee Shop.
- Zoe Waters producer of a reality show.
- Nicole a student of St Judes.
- Hyacinth Sylvester runs the watermill at the summer camp.
- Margot the skate park counselor.
- Beatrice GG's first girlfriend.
- Clementine a girl who GG fell in love with in the episode Lab Rats.

== Voice cast ==
Character	French	English
Fred Leblanc	Guillaume Champoux	Mathew Mackay
Paul Leblanc	Jacques L'Heureux	Mark Camacho
Carol Leblanc	Natalie Hamel-Roy	Ellen David
Boonmee Leblanc	Johanne Léveillé	Sonja Ball
Fabienne Ledger	Karine Vanasse	Laura Teasdale
Gregory Gilbert Pyrowski	Emmanuel Bilodeau	Rick Jones
Benji John-Hooper	Frédéric Pierre	Danny Blanco-Hall
Madame Butterfly	Johanne Léveillé	Sonja Ball
Annette Freeze-Dright	Camille Cyr-Desmarais	Laura Teasdale
Penelope Truehart	Sophie Cadieux	Holly Gauthier-Frankel
Tamara Hartman	Joëlle Morin	Jesse Vinet
Jody Goodheart	Catherine Trudeau	Holly Gauthier-Frankel
Nino O'Neil	Sébastien Reding	Terrence Scammell
Johan Chabot	Claude Gagnon	Craig Francis
Manny Escobar	Hugolin Chevrette	Justin Bradley
Fanny Cotton	Marie-Chantal Perron	Taylor Baruchel
Theo Sturgeon		Richard Dumont
Anemone Worrynaut	Paul Sarrasin	Terrence Scammell
Mr. Pyrowski	Benoit Rousseau	Rick Jones
Mrs. Pyrowski	Johanne Léveillé	Pauline Little
Balthazar Fairchild	Johanne Léveillé	Terrence Scammell
Dr. Hartman	Didier Lucien	Pierre Lenoir

== Episodes ==
The sole season consists of 26 22-minute episodes. Each episode begins with a cold opening and ends with Fred's personal thoughts on the day.

No.	Title	Directed by	Written by	Storyboard by	Original release date	Prod. code
1	"Life Through Rose Colored Glasses"	Benoit Godbout and Sylvain Lavoie	Story by : Benoit Godbout & Mathieu Plante; Script by : Jean-François Léger, Manon & Muguette Berthelet	Jean-Pierre Barja, Sylvain Lavoie, Vincent Chassé & Paul-Henri Ferrant	October 29, 2007	101
Fred becomes obsessed with a Chinese puzzle Madam Butterfly gave him. Since he plays that game all night long, Anemone Worrynaut, the school psychologist, mistakes Fred's behavior with the symptoms of depression. Since Fred looks more blasé than ever, she is afraid that his attitude will have repercussions on all of his classmates. So Anemone decides to turn the school into a nice, happy environment. Pink walls, whales sounds. To worsen things, Worrynaut tells the entire school that it's Fred's fault. With everyone (even his mother) against him, Fred must find a way to return the school to normal by convincing Anemone. Meanwhile, Balthazar, the armless science teacher, loses his pet monkey Claude (who plays the role of his arms since he lacks his own). No longer able to perform his daily routine, Balthazar becomes more and more depressed but no one seems to care, especially the school psychologist.
2	"Move On, There's Nothing to See!"	Benoit Godbout and Sylvain Lavoie	Synopsis by: Olivier Kemeid and Manon & Muguette Berthelet; Script by: Manon & Muguette Berthelet	Marc-Antoine Sauvillers & Benjamin Botella	January 12, 2008	102
Fred accepts to make an exhibit of Anette's paintings. However, the day and time Anette chose is the same as a show nobody wants to miss. So, to bring up people to the exhibit, Fred agrees to turn a promotional, gory clip. Of course, when the people there notice there is nothing gory, a paint fight soon begins. During this time, Fabienne has problems with her hair and asks Fred to put them back to red. Big mistake—now her hair looks like "a brain surgery that went wrong". And GG becomes more and more interested in the accident show becoming the fad around, the exact one that ruins the exhibit. When his parents try to fix the antenna to see themselves on TV, however, GG's father becomes the superstar of the show.
3	"Joy Incarnate"	Benoit Godbout and Sylvain Lavoie	Synopsis by: Jean-François Léger; Script by: Benoit Godbout & Jean-François Légar	Jean-Pierre Barja	January 13, 2008	103
When Aunt Monique brings a Russian gnome as a gift for Fred, his blasé attitude results in Aunt Monique bringing it back, thinking Fred didn't like it. Noticing his expression might play tricks on him, he decides to learn to express his feelings. He is in a class with only Anette and the actor of Captain Splendid as their teacher. After some classes, Fred better expresses his feelings—until he agrees to appear in an ad. During this time, GG tries to find a useless thing to give to Fred for their friendship birthday. However, nothing he finds is actually useless (either Fred already has it, or it has a second use).
4	"Dear Madam Butterfly..."	Benoit Godbout and Sylvain Lavoie	Manon & Muguette Berthelet	Sylvain Lavoie and Julie Rocheleau	January 27, 2008	104
When Anette asks Fred to help her paint a mural, he agrees. However, when he is sent to the psychologist's local, he looks through the student files, hoping to discover if Panook is a boy or a girl. Anemone catches him red-handed and orders him to take care of Madam Butterfly, the Leblanc family's elderly neighbor. Since Fred spends all his time at Madam Butterfly's apartment, he cannot help Anette paint her mural. And Penelope, who wants to go to the theatre with Benji and another couple, decides to find Fred a girlfriend by organizing blind dates.
5	"Business is Business"	Benoit Godbout and Sylvain Lavoie	Synopsis by: Jean-Vincent Contrafatto; Script by: Benoit Godbout, Jean-Vincent Contrafatto, Manon & Muguette Berthelet	Yves Rodier	February 3, 2008	105
Fred, trying to find a job, finds one at the clown shop owned by GG's parents. However, he doesn't close the freezer door well enough, and the next day the rotten meat stinks up the entire boutique. A corrupt health inspector asks for an extremely high bribe to not close down the Clown Shop. However, while bringing food to some clients, GG finds the love of his life and doesn't come back, which means he won't be there to help Fred face his trouble. Also, Fabienne and Soya Green start getting on each other's nerves.
6	"Life is a Highway"	Benoit Godbout and Sylvain Lavoie	Malorie Nault-Cousineau	Sylvain Lavoie	February 10, 2008	106
Feeling like Fred needs some days without his parents, he decides to go camping with GG, Fabienne and Benji. However, the entire family comes along. And Benji, having the stomach flu, can't come so he sends Penelope instead. The four teenagers get lost on their way and arrive at another camp. Penelope is always talking to Benji on her cellphone, and it begins to seriously get on Fabienne's nerves. Finally, Penelope meets a sexy white boy named Kevin at the camp and falls in love. She forgives him when she remembers about Benji.
7	"Rodent Terror"	Benoit Godbout and Sylvain Lavoie	Synopsis by: Malorie Nault-Cousineau & Benoit Godbout; Script by: Malorie Nault-Cousineau	Karine Charlebois	February 17, 2008	112
Fred, as a new member of the basketball team, must have an initiation: getting entirely shaved. During this time a water spill starts in the school and principal Theo Sturgeon asks the school to be shut down for workers to arrange the problem. However, thousands of squirrels invade the school, seeking the peanuts that have been placed in the gymnasium. The basketball team searches for Fred around the school and Penelope, Benji, Jody and Fabienne enter. Fred came back to the school because he lost a picture of Anette in a bikini. And of course, they stay trapped in the school with the squirrels invading everywhere! And it results in Fred and Penelope and Fred trapped in the gymnasium. Yes, that gymnasium where the peanuts are...
8	"Spills of the Heart"	Benoit Godbout and Sylvain Lavoie	Jean-Rémi François	Karine Charlebois	February 24, 2008	108
Fred hates parties, Fabienne too. But they agree to make a pink party so GG will meet his new love interest, Fabienne's cousin Fatima. Fred figures he can charm Anette at the party as well. Anette arrives at the party with a guy she just started dating, William Intense. During the party, when Madam Butterfly goes out for paper towels she comes back with sangria. Party crashers Yohan and Manny put some in Fred's glass of juice. The rest of the evening is difficult for Fred, extremely drunk. GG and Fatima are the perfect couple, they each have the same passion for meat, and share the dream of marrying each other. But when she asks him to go upstairs for some pleasure, he immediately breaks up with her because he refuses any sex before marriage.
9	"One Red Hair Away from Love"	Benoit Godbout and Sylvain Lavoie	Malorie Nault-Cousineau & Benoit Godbout	Sylvain Lavoie	February 28, 2008	109
There's a new student in Fred's class. Her name is Fanny Cotton and she's a beautiful redhead. She flashes on Fred after he saves her from Claude. The two fall in love after some time, but she quickly becomes obsessive, invasive, and extremely jealous. However, this relation growing too fast begins to scare Fred's mother. Advertise him will of course be difficult. Until Fred decides to leave her on his own, for a safety reason. There is also a TV show talking about normal people problems. This week's episode talks about a girl who lost all her hair because of flowers...
10	"A Moldy Friendship"	Benoit Godbout and Sylvain Lavoie	Story by : Christel Gonnard; Script by : Manon & Muguette Berthelet	Yves Rodier	March 9, 2008	110
Fred's room is so messy that anyone can be badly hurt by walking on some toy scattered around. And this is what happens to Carol, and she needs a small toy soldier to be put out of her foot. GG convinces Fred to clean his room by telling him Anette needed a place to store her paintings. When Fred discovers that it was all a lie, he is angry after GG and none of them wants to be friends with the other anymore. Fabienne, trapped between Fred and GG and suffering their breaking up, must find a way to tie their friendship back to what it was before. GG finds a stupid excuse for why they are no more friends. Penelope also repeatedly tries to find out if Panook is a boy or a girl. All questions they answer might work for each, so their gender remains ambiguous. Finally, Carol, trying to make the house more Feng Shui, rounds the sides of a table. She however forgets to put the small wooden parts away and someone might soon walk on one!
11	"Madness at the Lake!"	Benoit Godbout and Sylvain Lavoie	Story by : Loic Frev and Manon & Muguette Berthelet; Script by : Manon & Muguette Berthelet	Sylvain Lavoie	March 16, 2008	111
Fred becomes counselor in a camp he didn't even subscribe to become one. Anette is there too, and three other teenagers. One of them is... Fanny! She however claims she developed amnesia while falling down the stairs and to have forgotten Fred. However, our blasé hero is sure she's lying. He rapidly finds her journal and discovers the truth... Trying to call his friends for help, the line is cut and Fabienne and GG come to help him. But what has Fanny done of Anette? She can't be found anywhere!
12	"A Christmas Carol"	Benoit Godbout and Sylvain Lavoie	Manon & Muguette Berthelet	Patrick Dovon, Sylvain Lavoie & Didier Loubat	March 23, 2008	107
This year's Christmas is going to be difficult for Fred. He is fed up with the traditions given by his parents, such as elf ears and handmade decorations. He decides to leave his family so he spends this Christmas with Fabienne. They also decide to spend it with a homeless man. Penelope wants a big gift in a big box from her Benji-poo. Since he has only 20 bucks, he will find the search difficult. The Hart Trio makes a gift exchange. But each girl buys something it would fit her only. So each girl is angry an each other. Finally, GG also has his own tradition and brings gifts to all his few friends.
13	"Pretty in Your Skin..."	Benoit Godbout and Sylvain Lavoie	Jean-Rémi François	Jean-Pierre Barja & Julie Rocheleau	March 30, 2008	113
At the school fair, instead of winning the razor-cellphone-MP3 he wanted, Fred wins a free plastic surgery. This is however a bad gift, as everyone wants it. When GG accidentally hits Fred's nose, the main hero decides to use the surgery on his nose, also hoping to win Anette's heart with these few touch-ups. GG wins the U.S. president's underwear and decides to pimp up his old car with the auction profits. He then decides to use it to bring girls to him. Thinking only to pimp it, he didn't think about repairing it... Carol also tries a new method for losing weight, however, it rapidly proves useless and finally, she also asks her son for the surgery to lose all that weight. The new reality show is all about beauty. "Especially studied and tested for unicellular brains."
14	"Fred TV"	Benoit Godbout and Sylvain Lavoie	Benoit Godbout	Marc-Antoine Sauvillers	April 6, 2008	114
Fred's family is chosen by Zoe Waters, a new producer, for a new reality show. Everything goes well, until Zoe changes to her own will whatever Fred said so he looks gay. And of course, not only does Fred is treated as gay everywhere, but that student named Rudolph falls in love with him... this also ruining Fred's chances with Anette. During the second episode of the reality show, Zoe goes further. She makes everyone believe Carol and Paul hate Fred for being gay and that Madam Butterfly is their "slave". They end up in jail, with Fred and Boon Mee in an elderly couple's apartment. At the end of the episode, Zoe is forced to publicly apologize to the LeBlanc family and set things right.
15	"So Long, Worrynaut!"	Benoit Godbout and Sylvain Lavoie	Manon & Muguette Berthelet	Jean-Pierre Barja & Vincent Chassé	April 20, 2008	115
Fred decides to organize a Halloween party, hoping Fabienne will invite Anette. By pit for him, he also invites Nino O'Neil. He also wishes Anemone Worynautto disappear... until one hour or so before the party, he sees her in the street, probably dead. He is overcome with guilt and sees her ghost everywhere. And he also gets weird calls. Nino also really wants to kiss a girl for the first time, so he never stops asking that to Madam Butterfly, who brought her spiritism game. Also, after having eaten too many yogurts, Penelope is caught in Fred's bedroom during the party, with terrible farts. She won't be able to dance with Benji as the Beauty and the Beast! And finally, Fabienne and Anette still didn't arrive at the party, which begins to worry Fred. But he yet has enough to do with Anemone's ghost...
16	"Love Shakes"	Benoit Godbout and Sylvain Lavoie	Malorie Nault-Cousineau	Jean-Pierre Barja, Vincent Chassé & Ricardo Audisio	April 27, 2008	116
Carol and Paul, having couple problems, go to a session so love will better pass between them. They leave the house to Aunt Moniques, who immediately makes almost all the stuff in the house disappear. Trying to avoid his aunt, Fred finds a job at the café, where Tamara also works. There begins to have some kind of romance between them. However, because of a small problem, Mr. Julian fires Tamara... GG brings his younger brother Jojo to the café. Jojo starts causing small problems around also. And finally, hating her mother's new boyfriend, Penelope "officially" runs away from the familial house. She hides in Fred's bedroom' wardrobe and meets a Pinata, to which she does nothing than what she knows to do best: talk.
17	"Half-Fried Herrings"	Benoit Godbout and Sylvain Lavoie	Manon & Muguette Berthelet	Sylvain Lavoie	May 4, 2008	117
Fred and Tamara are really in love, and so Tamara plans a date to the best restaurant in town. But Fred lacks money, so he decides to get a job at the Clown Shop. He likes it less when he becomes the herring mascot of the shop, and he smiles even less when he accidentally bumps into Tamara's mother... GG, falls in love with Jody's sister. She manipulates him so he drives her to Abitibi. Finally, Carol and Paul try to make pasta, but the instructions are badly translated and incomprehensible. They try their best but the result doesn't look at all like pasta.
18	"The Benji Method"	Benoit Godbout and Sylvain Lavoie	Story by : Olivier Vanelle; Script by : Manon & Muguette Berthelet	Fabrice Rodrigues	May 11, 2008	118
When things start going wrong between Fred and Tamara, Fred asks Benji what he does to keep his relationship well balanced. He uses the yes-no method, which Fred then uses. Despite this, Tamara soon discovers it and things start going wrong – again. Also, Fred tries it with his mother, and it works. With this method, he however also accepts to guard the principal's dog, and he also accepts a bungee jump so the basketball team gets new uniforms. But not only is Tamara sad because she was angry at Fred... but the place where Fred has to do the jump is really dangerous as many people died there.
19	"The Analgesic of Apocalypse"	Benoit Godbout and Sylvain Lavoie	Malorie Nault-Cousineau	Sylvain Lavoie, Yves Rodier & Julie Rocheleau	May 18, 2008	119
Jody, still the only one alone of the Hart Trio, begins to hate the new Fred-Tamara couple. The French teacher also decides that Fred comes with her at Acapulco, because he got the best notes of the class. While the entire class actually thinks it's a vacation, it is in fact a series of conferences. GG, sad because Fred spends more time with Tamara, buys two lovebirds. Not everything goes well however; Anette is back from vacation, and Fred must make a choice. The situation worsens when a fortune cookie tells him that a series of mishaps will happen to him, and he finally ends up in a hospital, where he must finally decide between Tamara and Anette.
20	"Within a Hair's Breadth of Happiness"	Benoit Godbout and Sylvain Lavoie	Malorie Nault-Cousineau	Sylvain Lavoie, Yves Rodier, Julie Rocheleau & Vincent Chassé	May 25, 2008	120
Fred is still at the hospital. Nothing can harm him there, he is tied to his bed and can't move because of the way his mother places the bedsheets. However, new threats appear. The C-baldy bacterium might divest Fred of every hair, thus making him unattractive to women. And there is also this strange nurse sneaking about his room. Fred's mother and friends don't believe it at all. Tamara nurses her heartbreak, and Penelope suggests a change of look. The Trio is now a duo since Jody has been left out. But a big mistake will result in a horrible style and a need for Jody to come back in the Trio. And Fred also is afraid that Anette is not interested in him because he might lose all his hair, and so sends GG to bring Anette so he can confess his feelings. And the title reveals already too much about the strange nurse.
21	"The Make-Up Sausage"	Benoit Godbout and Sylvain Lavoie	Malorie Nault-Cousineau	Yves Rodier, Sylvain Lavoie & Julie Rocheleau	June 1, 2008	121
Fred rescues Nino from being harassed by Johan and Manny. Nino decides Fred is his friend for life, but GG is jealous and doesn't like it one bit. The Beast Leblanc fell in love with a beautiful female cat, and desperately tries to go do it with its new love. After many remarks about the blonde jokes, Penelope turns her hair color to brown, and already feels smarter. And Carol catches the habit to bring people for supper when she doesn't know what to tell them.
22	"The Wheels of Doubt"	Benoit Godbout and Sylvain Lavoie	Story by : Loic Frev; Script by : Manon & Muguette Berthelet	Elie Klimos	June 8, 2008	122
Carol does, once again, too much for her son. So she gets him a summer job at the skate park. Not everything goes well, as next to nobody listens to him. But there is a good point; the other counselor, Margot, seems to like him. For once, Fred doesn't look blasé at all. He always smiles... Carol thinks this is weird, she thinks it is due to illegal substances. She also calls Madam Butterfly so she can predict Fred's future. She predicts violence and granulous substances, and she is never wrong, so Carol begins to worry for good. And Paul never stops telling his wife she's doing too much for Fred.
23	"Lab Rats"	Benoit Godbout and Sylvain Lavoie	Story by : Jean-Rémi François; Script by : Jean-Rémi François & Cyrille Vavsette	Sylvain Lavoie, Vincent Chassé & Yves Rodier	June 15, 2008	123
Fred is at a summer camp where it seems kids are encouraged to do nothing at all, but he quickly realizes that something strange is going on.
24	"A Minor Runaway..."	Benoit Godbout and Sylvain Lavoie	Manon & Muguette Berthelet	Fabrice Rodrigues	June 22, 2008	124
After an earthquake, Fred and Penelope find themselves locked in a broom closet. While Fred is forced to endure Penelope's vapid company, his disappearance begins to worry his frantic mother. Meanwhile, Fabienne is trying to find out what is bugging Anette.
25	"Blow-Out Sale"	Benoit Godbout and Sylvain Lavoie	Malorie Nault-Cousineau	Benoit Godbout & Sylvain Lavoie	June 29, 2008	125
Against a backdrop of memories evoked by Fred's friends, Carol organizes a garage sale and sells Anemone an object containing a love letter from Fred to Anette.
26	"Sweet Sixteen Surprise!"	Benoit Godbout and Sylvain Lavoie	Manon & Muguette Berthelet	Elie Klimos	July 6, 2008	126
When their car breaks down in the countryside, GG and Fab let slip to Fred that a surprise party is being organized for his 16th birthday. He refuses to attend until he finds out Annette is invited. But will Penelope spoil Fred's chance to finally open up to Annette? Fred's thought for the day: (Fred is happy and giddy) "So what words of wisdom can I tell you today?" (Annette pops into the shot) "What would you say to: 'Don't talk with your mouth full?!?!?" " (The two kiss and Annette pulls down a shade to transition to the closing credits)

== Reception ==
=== Awards ===
==== Actra Montreal Awards ====
- (2008): Rick Jones (voice of Gregory-Gilbert Pyrowski) Winner of Outstanding Voice Performance

==== Gala des prix Gémeaux (Quebec's Geminy/Emmy Awards — Canada) ====
- (2008): Winner of "Best animated series".

=== Nominations ===
==== Actra Montreal Awards ====
- (2008): Mathew Mackay (voice of Fred Leblanc) nominated for Outstanding Voice Performance
- (2008): Holly Gauthier-Frankel (voice of Penelope Truehart) nominated for Outstanding Voice Performance

==== Gala des prix Gémeaux (Quebec's Geminy/Emmy Awards — Canada) ====
- (2008): Best script for a youth audience (ep: Episode 4: Dear Madam Butterfly. writers: Manon Berthelet and Mughette Berthelet).
- (2008): Best (web site) for a TV series.

==== International Animation Festival in Annecy (France) ====
- (2008): Official selection — Best TV series

==== Cartoon on the bay: Pulcinella Awards (Italy) ====
- (2008): Official selection - "TV series for all ages"
