= Wimzie's House =

- Genre: Children's television series
- Starring: Sonja Ball; Tyrone Benskin; Jennifer Seguin; Liz MacRae; Jane Woods; Thor Bishopric; Holly Gauthier-Frankel; Bruce Dinsmore
- Opening theme: "At Wimzie's House" performed by Sonja Ball
- Ending theme: "At Wimzie's House" (instrumental version)
- Composer: Daniel Scott
- Country of origin: Canada
- No. of seasons: 2
- No. of episodes: 112

Production
- Executive producers: Micheline Charest; Ronald A. Weinberg
- Running time: 25 minutes 28 minutes (for most PBS airings)
- Production company: CINAR Films

Original release
- Network: Télévision de Radio-Canada (1995); Radio-Québec (1995); CBC Television (1996)
- Release: September 4, 1995 – December 8, 1996

Wimzie's House is a Canadian children's television series produced in Montreal which ran in the French language as La Maison de Ouimzie on Télévision de Radio-Canada in the morning and Radio-Québec in late afternoons beginning September 4, 1995, and in English on CBC Television in Canada beginning October 21, 1996 and in the United States on PBS from September 1, 1997 until August 31, 2001. The show was produced by Quebec-based studio CINAR Films (then Cookie Jar Entertainment, now WildBrain), with PBS airings presented by Maryland Public Television from 1997 until 2001.

The show's puppetry is in the style of Sesame Street (another show aired on same channel), which led to some legal troubles with The Jim Henson Company in 2000 (even though they had some collaboration for some certain children's TV shows e.g., Hi Opie!, Dog City (Corus' animation studio), Fraggle Rock, The Hoobs, etc., as well as the same with its production partner, CTW (now as Sesame Workshop), best known for Sesame Park, the Canadian adaptation of Sesame Street).

== Premise ==
The series follows Wimzie, a young hybrid monster who lives with her parents (Rousso & Graziella), grandmother (Yaya), and baby brother (Bo). The basic plot typically involves Wimzie and her friends (Jonas, Loulou, and Horace) encountering a problem, with two songs that would eventually lead to the moral of the episode.

== Characters ==
There are eight characters appear throughout the series. (Voices listed here are for the Canadian English-language version.)

- Wimzie (performed by Brigitte Brideau and voiced by Sonja Ball) is the protagonist of the series, who is a dragon/bird hybrid with a unique appearance, yellow-orange fur, purple hair tied in pigtails decorated in baby blue bows and red wing-like antlers on the top of her head. She is 5 years old and also introduces each episode in the beginning of the series. In the musical numbers, she performs a few of her solo songs which are titled "When There's a Job to Do", "Turtles", "Be Exactly Who You Are", "Something in My Head" and "I Love You". She has a baby brother named Bo.
- Rousso (performed by Michel P. Ranger and voiced by Tyrone Benskin) is Wimzie's father. He is a calm tailless dragon with orange fur and blonde hair. He works as a firefighter. When not on the job, Rousso likes to relax. He's a little slow but very kind-hearted. It has been revealed that he has a sister named Alice who is Wimzie's aunt.
- Graziella (performed by Michel Ledoux, assisted by Helen Evans, voiced by Jennifer Seguin) is Wimzie's mother. She is a bird- or platypus-like monster (as she has arms—like a platypus—instead of wings) with pink featherless fur and blonde hair in a beehive hairdo. When not on the job, Graziella will spend time with children, often giving them advice. She works as a pilot and is often away from home for extended periods. She has a brother named Mario, Wimzie's uncle, who forgot to send Wimzie a binga-boinga on her 5th birthday.
- Bo (performed by Lucie Beauvais and voiced by Liz MacRae) is Wimzie's baby brother. Being still a baby, he often gets most of Yaya's attention and the others keep tabs on him as well. Unlike Wimzie, he is a full tail-less dragon and not a hybrid like his big sister. He is still learning to talk, so he mostly communicates in gibberish. He is around the age of 12–18 months.
- Yaya (performed by Johanne Rodrigue, assisted by Grant Mason, voiced by Jane Woods) is Wimzie's maternal grandmother and Graziella's mother. (Like Graziella, she is also a bird or platypus-like monster.) She runs a daycare in Wimzie's house for Wimzie and her friends while their parents are working. She has lavender featherless fur and her hair is a stack of red, blonde and purple. Like Jonas and Loulou, she wears glasses. She occasionally talks to the children (whenever they have a problem) and gives them advice when they need it. Despite her old age, she is full of energy, often being more than a match for a houseful of children, daughter and son-in-law. She also silences everyone during an argument by making a foghorn-blowing noise and sound and nobody knows how she does it. She has a bedroom that is only seen in the intro.
- Jonas (performed by Andre Meunier, assisted by Jim Kroupa, voiced by Thor Bishopric) is a goblin who is 5 years old and loves science. He collects dirt and has a surprisingly large collection. His fur is green with purple hair and he wears eyeglasses and a propeller cap. Often in his explanations, he would include his catchphrase "It's very scientific." Loulou is his little sister. Wimzie possibly has a crush on him.
- Loulou (performed by Sylvie Comtois and voiced by Holly Gauthier-Frankel) is Jonas's sister (and a goblin like Jonas). She wants to be like the bigger kids. Yet isn't quite ready to make the jump. She is capable of understanding Bo's baby-jabber. Her fur is yellow-green. She wears eyeglasses and has purple hair like her brother, worn in a high ponytail decorated in a bow. Her solo songs are titled "When I'm Scared", "I Wanna Be Big Right Now", "Left Out" and "What's So Good About Being Big?".
- Horace (performed by Richard Lalancette and voiced by Bruce Dinsmore) is a troll. He is not as smart as the other kids, but he is always asking questions and learning things. He is the strongest of all the children, but angers easily and can sometimes be rough. He gets along best with Bo and his big sister Wimzie. His fur is light blue and his hair is reddish blonde and very straight. He also has a cousin named Morris who looks a lot like him and they are both voiced by the same actor. A running gag throughout every episode shows always saying, "Uh/um...question." and then another character would usually respond by saying, "Yes, Horace?".

== Episodes ==
=== Season 1 (1995) ===
1. The Cookie Crisis (September 4, 1995)
2. Boo! (September 5, 1995)
3. The Magic Crayon (September 6, 1995)
4. I Want My Mommy (September 7, 1995)
5. Flower Power (September 8, 1995)
6. Babies Have It Made (September 11, 1995)
7. The Scaredy Cats (September 12, 1995)
8. The Treasure Hunt (September 13, 1995)
9. The Boy Who Cried Wolf (September 14, 1995)
10. What's the Matter with Horace? (September 15, 1995)
11. You're Not My Friend (September 18, 1995)
12. To Share or Not To Share (September 19, 1995)
13. The Play's the Thing (September 20, 1995)
14. The Lucky Pin (September 21, 1995)
15. Queen For a Day (September 22, 1995)
16. A Fishy Fish Story (September 25, 1995)
17. To Tell the Truth (September 26, 1995)
18. Jonas, The Actor (September 27, 1995)
19. All Alone (September 28, 1995)
20. You Just Gotta Keep Trying (September 29, 1995)
21. A Medal for Horace (October 2, 1995)
22. By the Numbers (October 3, 1995)
23. Mad at Dad (October 4, 1995)
24. Aahhchoo! (October 5, 1995)
25. Wimzie's Hushabye (October 6, 1995)
26. The Tattletales (October 9, 1995)
27. I Dare You! (October 10, 1995)
28. We Want Toys! (October 11, 1995)
29. The Personal Trainer (October 12, 1995)
30. Jonas and All of His Hits (October 13, 1995)
31. Who Do You Trust? (October 16, 1995)
32. Jonas' Big Purple Map (October 17, 1995)
33. Wimzie's Three Wishes (October 18, 1995)
34. Who's The Boss? (October 19, 1995)
35. The Great Moving Day (October 20, 1995)
36. The Mighty Monster Power Piggies (October 23, 1995)
37. Wimzie's Scary Dream (October 24, 1995)
38. The Little Red Wimzie (October 25, 1995)
39. Friendship Day (October 26, 1995)
40. Bye Bye Birdie (October 27, 1995)
41. A Little Privacy, Please? (October 30, 1995)
42. I'm Scared for Daddy (October 31, 1995)
43. Bo Goes Bonkers! (November 1, 1995)
44. Identical Cousins (November 2, 1995)
45. The Hand-Me-Down Sweater (November 3, 1995)
46. I Think I Forgot Something (November 6, 1995)
47. Mommy's Afraid (November 7, 1995)
48. The Stuke-A-Piddleys (November 8, 1995)
49. The Tooth Fairy (November 9, 1995)
50. Wimzie's Late (November 10, 1995)
51. The Cookie Caper (November 13, 1995)
52. Wimzie's Big Trip (November 14, 1995)
53. The Lost Bone (November 15, 1995)
54. Official Backwards Day (November 16, 1995)
55. Doctor Wimzie (November 17, 1995)
56. The Assistant Grown-Up (November 20, 1995)

=== Season 2 (1996) ===
1. The Sore Winner (June 17, 1996)
2. To Each His Own (June 18, 1996)
3. The Contest (June 19, 1996)
4. Please Don't Say That! (June 20, 1996)
5. Be Yourself (June 21, 1996)
6. The Boys Against The Girls (June 24, 1996)
7. The Storm (June 25, 1996)
8. You Have to Learn the Trade (June 26, 1996)
9. Substitute Daddy (June 27, 1996)
10. Wimzie the Magician (June 28, 1996)
11. The Best Hiding Place on Earth (July 1, 1996)
12. The Jingle (July 2, 1996)
13. Mind Your Manners (July 3, 1996)
14. Picking a President (July 4, 1996)
15. We Can Do It! (July 5, 1996)
16. The Accident (July 8, 1996)
17. Happy Birthday, Yaya! (July 9, 1996)
18. The Dropsies (July 10, 1996)
19. Icky, Yucky and Goofy (July 11, 1996)
20. Cinderloulou (July 12, 1996)
21. Loulou Thinks Big (July 15, 1996)
22. Nicknames (July 16, 1996)
23. A Little Bit Testy (July 17, 1996)
24. Noises Night and Day (July 18, 1996)
25. Motherly Love (July 19, 1996)
26. I Don't Like Chores! (July 22, 1996)
27. Imagination in Action (July 23, 1996)
28. Promises, Promises (July 24, 1996)
29. The Telephone Call (July 25, 1996)
30. Am I Dreaming? (July 26, 1996)
31. What's the Truth? (July 29, 1996)
32. Wimzie the Prankster (July 30, 1996)
33. My Doll is for Sale (July 31, 1996)
34. The Show-Off (August 1, 1996)
35. Growing Up is Hard To Do (August 2, 1996)
36. From Dirt... to Ice Cream (August 5, 1996)
37. Shaggy's Visit (August 6, 1996)
38. Wimzie's Rainbow Wig (August 7, 1996)
39. Ants in My Pants (August 8, 1996)
40. The Silent Treatment (August 9, 1996)
41. Daddy's Girl (August 12, 1996)
42. Go for the Gold (August 13, 1996)
43. Wimzie's Family Career Day (August 14, 1996)
44. It's Bedtime! (August 15, 1996)
45. The Blackout (August 16, 1996)
46. Who Needs Yaya? (August 19, 1996)
47. All 'Round the World in a Day (August 20, 1996)
48. The Big Dinosaur (August 21, 1996)
49. The Gizmo-A-Gig-A-Bopper (August 22, 1996)
50. The Surprise That Wasn't (August 23, 1996)
51. The Ugly Scary Statue (August 26, 1996)
52. Horace Goes Whammer (August 27, 1996)
53. Wimzie Sees It All (August 28, 1996)
54. Wimzie the Interrupter (August 29, 1996)
55. The Magic Starfruit (August 30, 1996)
56. The Perfect Christmas (December 8, 1996)

== Featured songs ==
1. Wimzie's House Theme Song (sung in at the beginning of every episode)
2. Uh-Oh! (sung in "The Cookie Crisis", "The Boys Against the Girls", "What's The Truth?", "The Blackout" and "Horace Goes Whammer")
3. Always Tell the Truth (sung in "The Cookie Crisis" and "Ants in My Pants")
4. Best of Friends (sung in "Boo!" and "The Silent Treatment")
5. I Don't Like That (sung in "Boo!", "The Show-Off", "The Silent Treatment", "Horace Goes Whammer" and "Wimzie the Interrupter")
6. They Are Mine! (sung in "The Magic Crayon")
7. It's Okay to Say What We Feel (sung in "The Magic Crayon" and "Nicknames")
8. Time to Relax (sung in "I Want My Mommy")
9. Pretending (sung in "I Want My Mommy" and "Wimzie's Family Career Day")
10. Some Things in Life Just Take Time (sung in "Flower Power")
11. Together (sung in "Flower Power")
12. I Wish I Were a Baby (sung in "Babies Have It Made")
13. I Rather Just Be Me (sung in "Babies Have It Made")
14. Frightened in the Night (sung in "The Scaredy Cats")
15. Count on Your Friends (sung in "The Scaredy Cats" and "Motherly Love")
16. Sometimes There Are Two of Me (sung in "The Treasure Hunt", "The Sore Winner" and "Wimzie Sees It All")
17. I Know What I Should Do (sung in "The Treasure Hunt" and "The Big Dinosaur")
18. Let's Laugh Together (sung in "The Boy Who Cried Wolf", "Mind Your Manners" and "Wimzie the Prankster")
19. Playing Hide and Seek (sung in "The Boy Who Cried Wolf" and "The Best Hiding Place on Earth")
20. Why Do We Need Friends? (sung in "What's The Matter with Horace?" and "Am I Dreaming?")
21. Even If We Fight (sung in "What's The Matter with Horace?")
22. Left Out (sung in "You're Not My Friend" and "Cinderloulou")
23. Making Our Friendship Grow (sung in "You're Not My Friend")
24. It's My Turn (sung in "To Share or Not to Share")
25. If It's Mine (sung in "To Share or Not to Share" and "My Doll is for Sale")
26. We Want to Have Fun (sung in "The Play's The Thing")
27. Dilemma (sung in "The Play's The Thing")
28. I Do Well When I Feel Good (sung in "The Lucky Pin" and "The Show-Off")
29. Rousso's Recipe (sung in "The Lucky Pin")
30. Sick of Being Sick (sung in "Queen for a Day")
31. Sometimes Friends Can Make You Mad (sung in "Queen for a Day")
32. Animal Friends (sung in "A Fishy Fish Story" and "Shaggy's Visit")
33. Goldfish Goldfish (sung in "A Fishy Fish Story")
34. Love Makes Life Worth Living (sung in "To Tell the Truth")
35. True or False (sung in "To Tell the Truth" and "What's the Truth?")
36. When It Hurts (sung in "Jonas, The Actor" and "I Think I Forgot Something")
37. Sometimes Everyone Feels Afraid (sung in "Jonas, The Actor")
38. All Alone (sung in "All Alone")
39. Number 1 (sung in "All Alone")
40. Try Try Try Again (sung in "You Just Gotta Keep Trying" and "We Can Do It!")
41. Practice Makes Perfect (sung in "You Just Gotta Keep Trying")
42. Forgetting is Okay (sung in "A Medal for Horace" and "Wimzie the Prankster")
43. The Things You Miss (sung in "A Medal for Horace")
44. One Two Three (sung in "By the Numbers")
45. There's Only One Me (sung in "By the Numbers")
46. Lullaby for Bo (sung in "Mad at Dad" and "It's Bedtime!")
47. That Makes Me Mad! (sung in "Mad at Dad")
48. Darn These Allergies (sung in "AAHCHOO!")
49. Things That I Don't See (sung in "AAHCHOO!")
50. I Have a Secret (sung in "Wimzie's Hushabye" and "Shaggy's Visit")
51. When I Have a Friend (sung in "Wimzie's Hushabye" and "To Each His Own")
52. The One Color Crayon Blues (sung in "The Tattletales")
53. Tattletale (sung in "The Tattletales" and "The Surprise That...Wasn't")
54. Green Grape Funk (sung in "I Dare You!")
55. Don't You Dare (sung in "I Dare You!")
56. Everybody Loves Their Toys (sung in "We Want Toys!" and "Imagination in Action")
57. There Are Ways to Say I Love You (sung in "We Want Toys!", "Motherly Love" and "The Telephone Call")
58. You Gotta Get Physical (sung in "The Personal Trainer" and "The Big Dinosaur")
59. Healthy Habits (sung in "The Personal Trainer" and "Loulou Thinks Big")
60. Hands Are Not Made for a Fight (sung in "Jonas and All of His Hits")
61. Timeouts (sung in "Jonas and All of His Hits", "Be Yourself" and "Wimzie the Interrupter")
62. On TV! On TV! (sung in "Who Do You Trust?")
63. Not Too Much TV (sung in "Who Do You Trust?" and "The Blackout")
64. I Love My Dirt (sung in "Jonas' Big Purple Map" and "From Dirt...to Ice Cream")
65. Permission First (sung in "Jonas' Big Purple Map", "The Telephone Call" and "Wimzie's Rainbow Wig")
66. The Wishing Song (sung in "Wimzie's Three Wishes" and "Wimzie Sees it All")
67. Families and Friends (sung in "Wimzie's Three Wishes" and "Am I Dreaming?")
68. I Was Born to Lead (sung in "Who's the Boss?")
69. Life Is Simply Grand (sung in "Who's the Boss?")
70. When I Miss Someone I Love (sung in "The Great Moving Day")
71. To Help a Friend (sung in "The Great Moving Day", "Substitute Daddy" and "The Gizmo-A-Gig-A-Bopper")
72. The Mighty Monster Power Piggies (sung in "The Mighty Monster Power Piggies")
73. Find Your Own Dream (sung in "The Mighty Monster Power Piggies", "Picking A President" and "I Don't Like Chores")
74. The Monster Mask (sung in "Wimzie's Scary Dream")
75. I Like to Dream (sung in "Wimzie's Scary Dream")
76. On Lazy Days (sung in "The Little Red Wimzie")
77. When There's a Job to Do (sung in "The Little Red Wimzie", and "I Don't Like Chores!")
78. Are You My Friend? (sung in "Friendship Day")
79. Even If We're Friends (sung in "Friendship Day" and "The Contest")
80. It's Okay to Cry (sung in "Bye Bye Birdie" and "Promises, Promises")
81. We All Need Taking Care Of (sung in "Bye Bye Birdie")
82. Yaya's Diary (sung in "A Little Privacy, Please?" and "Who Needs Yaya?")
83. Tape Recorder Rap (sung in "A Little Privacy, Please?" and "All 'Round the World in a Day")
84. Turtles (sung in "I'm Scared for Daddy" and "Go for the Gold")
85. I'm a Fireman (sung in "I'm Scared for Daddy" and "Promises, Promises")
86. Where is Bo? (sung in "Bo Goes Bonkers!" and "The Ugly Scary Statue")
87. Taking a Nap (sung in "Bo Goes Bonkers!")
88. Stand Up and Speak Out (sung in "Identical Cousins")
89. I Like to Be Me (sung in "Identical Cousins")
90. Brand New Again (sung in "The Hand-Me-Down Sweater" and "The Gizmo-A-Gig-A-Bopper")
91. What Makes Something Special (sung in "The Hand-Me-Down Sweater", "You Have to Learn the Trade" and "My Doll is for Sale")
92. Me and My Dad (sung in "I Think I Forgot Something" and "Wimzie the Magician")
93. Feeling Afraid (sung in "Mommy's Afraid")
94. Sometimes I'm Scared (sung in "Mommy's Afraid", "The Storm", "Growing Up is Hard To Do" and "Ants in My Pants")
95. Invisible Me (sung in "The Stuke-A-Piddleys" and "The Dropsies")
96. The Words You Say (sung in "The Stuke-A-Piddleys" and "All 'Round the World in a Day")
97. That's the Rule (sung in "The Tooth Fairy" and "Please Don't Say That!")
98. Stay Awake (sung in "The Tooth Fairy" and "It's Bedtime!")
99. Tick Tock Clock (sung in "Wimzie's Late")
100. Right on Time (sung in "Wimzie's Late")
101. Snacktime is Fun (sung in "The Cookie Caper", "The Jingle" and "The Surprise That... Wasn't")
102. Privacy (sung in "The Cookie Caper")
103. It's Fun to Go Travelling (sung in "Wimzie's Big Trip" and "Who Needs Yaya?")
104. Disappointment (sung in "Wimzie's Big Trip" and "The Perfect Christmas")
105. Digging in the Dirt (sung in "The Lost Bone")
106. Bones (sung in "The Lost Bone" and "The Accident")
107. Let's Be Different (sung in "Official Backwards Day")
108. The Searching Song (sung in "Official Backwards Day", "Happy Birthday, Yaya!" and "Go for the Gold")
109. I'm Taking Care of Mommy (sung in "Doctor Wimzie")
110. Yaya's Good Tummy Soup (sung in "Doctor Wimzie")
111. It's Fun to Be Detectives (sung in "The Assistant Grown-Up")
112. Responsibility (sung in "The Assistant Grown-Up")
113. I Won (sung in "The Sore Winner" and "A Little Bit Testy")
114. I Like Painting Pictures (sung in "To Each His Own")
115. Playing Dress Up is Such Fun (sung in "The Contest", "Wimzie's Rainbow Wig" and "Wimzie's Family Career Day")
116. Watch Your Words (sung in "Please Don't Say That!" and "Icky, Yucky and Goofy")
117. Shhhhh (sung in "Be Yourself" and "Noises Night and Day")
118. Boys and Girls (sung in "The Boys Against the Girls" and "Daddy's Girl")
119. Scary Noises (sung in "The Storm")
120. Find a Better Way (sung in "You Have to Learn the Trade")
121. Our Dad (sung in "Substitute Daddy" and "Daddy's Girl")
122. Magic! (sung in "Wimzie the Magician" and "The Magic Starfruit")
123. Do the Right Thing! (sung in "The Best Hiding Place on Earth")
124. Trying to Figure Problems Out (sung in "The Jingle")
125. Good Manners (sung in "Mind Your Manners")
126. Presidents (sung in "Picking a President")
127. No Problem! (sung in "We Can Do It!")
128. Brothers and Sisters (sung in "The Accident")
129. Imagination (sung in "Happy Birthday, Yaya!")
130. Better Be Careful! (sung in "The Dropsies", "Imagination in Action" and "The Ugly Scary Statue")
131. I'm Special (sung in "Icky, Yucky and Goofy" and "The Magic Starfruit")
132. What's So Good About Being Tall? (sung in "Cinderloulou")
133. I Wanna Be Big Right Now (sung in "Loulou Thinks Big" and "Growing Up is Hard to Do")
134. The Nicknames (sung in "Nicknames")
135. We All Need Each Other (sung in "A Little Bit Testy" and "From Dirt to... Ice Cream")
136. Noisy Noises (sung in "Noises Night and Day")
137. I Love Snow (sung in "The Perfect Christmas")

== Merchandise ==
School supply company Carson-Dellosa confirmed that there were two FMV PC games based on the series.

== Controversies ==
In 1999, The Jim Henson Company issued a lawsuit against the company, claiming the series' puppets and resultant merchandise violated its copyright and trademark rights on The Muppets. CINAR and its licensees Eden LLC and Carson-Dellosa Publishing Company denied and continue to deny any wrongdoing or liability for infringement.

A confidential settlement allowed CINAR to continue broadcasting the series, selling show merchandise, and a "mechanism for preserving the distinctive look of Jim Henson's Muppets in CINAR's future productions."

Ronald A. Weinberg, CINAR President and Co-CEO:

We are delighted that it's been settled and that the agreement leaves an open door between the two companies. It's also good news that WIMZIE'S HOUSE will continue to enjoy such a broad audience on PBS in the U.S. and on other channels in over 100 countries around the world. Furthermore, it means that the licensing initiative we launched last year will continue to flourish with both established and new licensee partners.

== Broadcast and home media ==
It first ran in the French language as La Maison de Ouimzie on Télévision de Radio-Canada in the morning and Radio-Québec in late afternoons starting September 4, 1995, and in English on CBC Television in Canada beginning October 21, 1996 and in the U.S. on PBS from September 1, 1997 until August 31, 2001. Repeats of the show aired in the U.S. on the Cookie Jar Toons block on now-defunct This TV, in syndication as part of the Cookie Jar Kids Network block, and on Light TV (now rebranded as TheGrio.TV) from December 22, 2016 until September 30, 2019. Treehouse TV also aired this show in repeats from 1999 until December 2005.

=== Video releases ===
Five hour-long VHS tapes were released by Sony Wonder in 1999 until 2000.

- It's Magic Time! (August 10, 1999)
- You're Special (August 10, 1999)
- Pet Tales (March 7, 2000)
- Babies Have It Made (March 7, 2000)
- Happy Holidays (September 12, 2000)

=== DVD releases ===
On July 27, 2010, Mill Creek Entertainment released a 10-episode Best-of collection entitled Wimzie's House: A World of Enchantment on DVD in Region 1 which includes a bonus episode of Busytown Mysteries.

=== Streaming ===
The first 20 episodes would be currently available for free on Tubi, while the rest of the episodes can be purchased on Fandango at Home (formerly known as "Vudu").

== See also ==
- Allegra's Window
- Nanalan'
- Tweenies
- The Big Comfy Couch
- Ants in Your Pants
- Groundling Marsh
