= 2024 Atlantic International Film Festival =

Canadian film festival

- Opening film: Sharp Corner by Jason Buxton
- Closing film: Anora by Sean Baker
- Location: Halifax, Nova Scotia, Canada
- Founded: 1980
- Festival date: September 11–18, 2024
- Website: atlanticfilmfestival.ca

Atlantic International Film Festival
- 2025 2023

The 2024 edition of the Atlantic International Film Festival, the 44th edition in the event's history, took place from September 11 to 18, 2024 in Halifax, Nova Scotia, Canada. The first films in the program were announced on July 25, with the full program announced on August 14.

The event was scaled back to an extent from previous years, with a program of 96 features and shorts compared to almost 200 in the years prior to the COVID-19 pandemic. Festival chief Martha Cooley attributed this decision both to residents of the Halifax area still having a greater reticence in returning to large scale public events after the pandemic than people in other parts of Canada, and to the perception that as Halifax has a smaller population than cities like Toronto or Vancouver, audiences were being "pulled too thin" by past programs that were approaching the size of TIFF or VIFF.

The festival opened with Jason Buxton's film Sharp Corner, and closed with Sean Baker's Anora. The Atlantic Gala slot featured Melanie Oates's film Sweet Angel Baby.

== Awards ==
Award winners were announced on September 17, 2024.

Award	Film	Recipient
Gordon Parsons Award for Best Atlantic Canadian Feature	Sharp Corner	Jason Buxton
Best Atlantic Canadian Director	Sharp Corner	Jason Buxton
Joan Orenstein & David Renton Award for Outstanding Performance in Acting	The Kitchen Sink	Mary-Colin Chisholm
Joan Orenstein & David Renton Award for Outstanding Performance in Acting	Skeet	Sean Dalton
Joan Orenstein & David Renton Award for Outstanding Performance in Acting	Monica's News	Polly Gallant-McLean (honorable mention)
Best Atlantic Documentary	Seguridad	Tamara Segura
Best Atlantic Short Documentary	welima’q	shalan joudry
Best Atlantic Short Film	Pearls	Mike Simms
Best Atlantic Short Animation	Bloody Mess	Megan Wennberg
Michael Weir Award for Best Atlantic Screenwriting	Sweet Angel Baby	Melanie Oates
Best Atlantic Cinematographer	Skeet	Nigel Markham
Best Atlantic Editor	Monica's News	Kimberlee McTaggart
Best Atlantic Original Score	Lakeview	Siobhan Martin

== Official selections ==
=== Gala Presentations ===
English title	Original title	Director(s)	Production country
Anora		Sean Baker	United States
Sharp Corner		Jason Buxton	Canada
Sweet Angel Baby		Melanie Oates	Canada

=== Reel East Coast Shorts ===
English title	Original title	Director(s)	Province
Back to Camp 41		Greg Hemmings	Canada
Bedlamer		Alexa Jane Jerrett	Canada
Hairy Legs		Andrea Dorfman	Canada
An Impression of Everything		Millefiore Clarkes	Canada
The Kitchen Sink		Olivia King	Canada
Paper		Charles Wahl	Canada
Permit Garden		Jenny Yujia Shi	Canada
welima'q		shalan joudry	Canada

=== World Cinema ===
English title	Original title	Director(s)	Production country
Bird		Andrea Arnold	United Kingdom
Can I Get a Witness?		Ann Marie Fleming	Canada
Caught by the Tides	风流一代	Jia Zhangke	China
The Count of Monte Cristo	Le Comte de Monte Cristo	Matthieu Delaporte, Alexandre de La Patellière	France
Darkest Miriam		Naomi Jaye	Canada
Flow	Straume	Gints Zilbalodis	Latvia, France, Belgium
Grand Tour		Miguel Gomes	Portugal, Italy, France, Germany, Japan, China
Lakeview		Tara Thorne	Canada
Matt and Mara		Kazik Radwanski	Canada
The Outrun		Nora Fingscheidt	United Kingdom, Germany
Paying for It		Sook-Yin Lee	Canada
Presence		Steven Soderbergh	United States
Reinas		Klaudia Reynicke	Switzerland, Peru, Spain
Rumours		Guy Maddin, Evan Johnson, Galen Johnson	Canada, Germany
The Seed of the Sacred Fig		Mohammad Rasoulof	Iran, France, Germany
Skeet		Nik Sexton	Canada
To the Moon		Kevin Hartford	Canada
Universal Language	Une langue universelle	Matthew Rankin	Canada
When the Light Breaks	Ljósbrot	Rúnar Rúnarsson	Iceland, Netherlands, Croatia, France

=== Narrative New Waves ===
English title	Original title	Director(s)	Production country
40 Acres		R. T. Thorne	Canada
All We Imagine as Light		Payal Kapadia	France, India, Netherlands, Luxembourg
Boxcutter		Reza Dahya	Canada
Do I Know You from Somewhere?		Arianna Martinez	Canada
Girls Will Be Girls		Shuchi Talati	India
Monica's News		Pamela Gallant	Canada
Pierce		Nelicia Low	Taiwan
Seeds		Kaniehtiio Horn	Canada
To a Land Unknown		Mahdi Fleifel	United Kingdom, Greece, Netherlands, France, Germany, Palestine, Qatar, Saudi Arabia
Young Werther		José Lourenço	Canada

=== Late Night Visions ===
English title	Original title	Director(s)	Production country
The Girl with the Needle	Pigen med nålen	Magnus von Horn	Denmark, Poland, Sweden
My Mother's Eyes	Maimazāzuaizu	Takeshi Kushida	Japan
The Substance		Coralie Fargeat	United Kingdom, United States, France

=== In Focus ===
English title	Original title	Director(s)	Production country
Heartbeat		Andrea Dorfman	Canada
How to Be Alone		Andrea Dorfman	Canada

=== Documentaries ===
English title	Original title	Director(s)	Production country
7 Beats per Minute		Yuqi Kang	Canada
Any Other Way: The Jackie Shane Story		Michael Mabbott, Lucah Rosenberg-Lee	Canada
Black Box Diaries		Shiori Itō	Japan, United Kingdom, United States
Curl Power		Josephine Anderson	Canada
Dahomey		Mati Diop	France, Senegal, Benin
Disco's Revenge		Omar Majeed, Peter Mishara	Canada
Grand Theft Hamlet		Pinny Grylls, Sam Crane	United Kingdom
Luther: Never Too Much		Dawn Porter	United States
Made in England: The Films of Powell and Pressburger		David Hinton	United Kingdom
Never Look Away		Lucy Lawless	New Zealand
A Photographic Memory		Rachel Elizabeth Seed	United States
Seguridad		Tamara Segura	Canada
Standing Above the Clouds		Jalena Keane-Lee	United States
The Tragically Hip: No Dress Rehearsal		Mike Downie	Canada

=== Shorts ===
English title	Original title	Director(s)	Production country
8 Times		Adam Mbowe	Canada
73 Seconds		Stacy Gardner	Canada
Bloody Mess		Megan Wennberg	Canada
Bust		Angalis Field	United States
Cart Girls		Katelyn McCulloch	Canada
Carved from Stone		Tyler Burr	Canada
Circle		Yumi Joung	South Korea
Cold Soup	Sopa Fria	Marta Monteiro	Portugal, France
The Distance Between Us	Qu'importe le distance	Léo Fontaine	France
Every Other Weekend		Mick Robertson, Margaret Rose	Canada
Eye Piece		Kate Solar	Canada
Freedom		Scott Jones	Canada
Gaslit		Anna MacLean	Canada
Gigi		Cynthia Calvi	France
Good Grief		Megan Chumbley	United States
Hello Stranger		Amélie Hardy	Canada
Himalia		Clara Milo, Juliette Lossky	Canada
Holiday House		Alex Heller	United States
Inkwo for When the Starving Return	Inkwo à la défense des vivants	Amanda Strong	Canada
Julian and the Wind		Connor Jessup	Canada
Maybe Elephants	Kanskje det var elefanter	Torill Kove	Norway, Canada
Mother Tongue	Lea Tupu'anga	Vea Mafile'o	New Zealand
Motorcycle Mary		Haley Watson	United States
Moving Water		Kaia Singh	Canada
Nola		Aisha Evelyna, Natalie Novak Remplakowski	Canada
On a Sunday at Eleven		Alicia K. Harris	Canada
Panadrilo		Marcela Heilbron	Panama
Pearls		Mike Simms	Canada
Percebes		Alexandra Ramires, Laura Gonçalves	France, Portugal
perfectly a strangeness		Alison McAlpine	Canada
Santa Maria Kyoko		Guil Sela, Felix Loizillon	France
Terminally Ill		Chris Cole	United States
Things Behind the Sun		Giran Findlay	Canada
What Good Canadians Do		Stephanie Joline	Canada
Where My Branches Stem		Teresa Kuo	Canada
The Wolf	Le Loup	Theodore Ushev	Canada
Wouldn't Make It Any Other Way		Hao Zhou	United States
