= 2018 Stockholm International Film Festival =

Film festival edition

- Location: Stockholm, Sweden
- Founded: 1990
- Awards: Bronze Horse (Firecrackers by Jasmin Mozaffari)
- Festival date: 7–18 November 2018
- Website: stockholmfilmfestival.se/en

Stockholm International Film Festival
- 2019 2017

The 29th Stockholm International Film Festival took place on 7–18 November 2018 in Stockholm, Sweden.

Canadian drama film Firecrackers won the Bronze Horse, most prestigious award.

== Official selections ==
=== Competition ===
English title	Original title	Director(s)	Production countrie(s)
All Good	Alles ist gut	Eva Trobisch	Germany
Butterflies	Kelebkler	Tolga Karaçelik	Turkey
Capernaum	Capharnaüm	Nadine Labaki	Lebanon
The Chambermaid	La Camarista	Lila Avilés	Mexico
Diamantino		Gabriel Abrantes, Daniel Schmidt	Portugal, France, Brazil
Firecrackers		Jasmin Mozaffari	Canada
Fugue	Fuga	Agnieszka Smoczyńska	Poland, Czech Republic, Sweden
Genesis	Genèse	Philippe Lesage	Canada
Girl		Lukas Dhont	Belgium
Hard Paint	Tinta Bruta	Filipe Matzembacher, Marcio Reolon	Brazil
The Heiresses	Las Herederas	Marcelo Martinessi	Paraguay, Uruguay, Germany, Brazil, Norway
The Innocent	Der unschuldige	Simon Jacquemet	Switzerland, Germany
Jesus	Karai	Hiroshi Okuyama	Japan
The Kindergarten Teacher		Sara Colangelo	United States
The Load	Teret	Ognjen Glavonić	Serbia, Croatia, France, Iran, Qatar
Museum	Museo	Alonso Ruizpalacios	Mexico
Pause		Tonia Mishiali	Cyprus
Skate Kitchen		Crystal Moselle	United States
Styx		Wolfgang Fischer	Germany, Austria
Sunset	Napszállta	László Nemes	Hungary, France
Wildlife		Paul Dano	United States
X & Y		Anna Odell	Sweden

=== American Independents ===
English title	Original title	Director(s)	Production countrie(s)
American Animals		Bart Layton	United States
Beautiful Boy		Felix van Groeningen	United States
Blaze		Ethan Hawke	United States
Diane		Kent Jones	United States
Icebox		Daniel Sawka	United States
Jonathan		Bill Oliver	United States
A Kid Like Jake		Silas Howard	United States
Madeline's Madeline		Josephine Decker	United States
Mapplethorpe		Ondi Timoner	United States
Monsters and Men		Reinaldo Marcus Green	United States
Nancy		Christina Choe	United States
Night Comes On		Jordana Spiro	United States
Puzzle		Marc Turtletaub	United States
Thunder Road		Jim Cummings	United States
Tyrel		Sebastián Silva	United States
A Vigilante		Sarah Daggar-Nickson	United States
We the Animals		Jeremiah Zagar	United States

=== Discovery ===
English title	Original title	Director(s)	Production countrie(s)
Angel Face	Gueule d'ange	Vanessa Filho	France
Another Day of Life		Raúl de la Fuente, Damien Nenow	Poland, Spain, Germany, Belgium, Hungary
Blindspotting		Carlos López Estrada	United States
Girls of the Sun	Les filles du soleil	Eva Husson	France, Belgium, Georgia, Switzerland
Lemonade		Ioana Uricaru	Romania, Germany, Sweden, Canada
Little Tickles	Les Chatouilles	Andréa Bescond, Eric Métayer	France
Sofia		Meryem Benm'Barek-Aloïsi	France, Qatar
The Truk	L'enkas	Sarah Marx	France
Twin Flower	Fiore Gemello	Laura Luchetti	Italy
When the Trees Fall	Koly padayut dereva	Marysia Nikitiuk	Ukraine, Poland, Macedonia

=== Documentary Competition ===
English title	Original title	Director(s)	Production countrie(s)
An Army of Lovers	En Armé av Älskande	Ingrid Ryberg	Sweden
Ex-Shaman	Ex-Pajé	Luiz Bolognesi	Brazil
Fahrenheit 11/9		Michael Moore	United States
Freedom Fields		Naziha Arebi	Libya, United Kingdom
I See Red People	Je vois Rouge	Bojina Panayotova	France, Bulgaria
Minding the Gap		Bing Liu	United States
People's Republic of Desire		Hao Wu	China, United States
Putin's Witnesses	Svideteli Putina	Vitaly Mansky	Latvia, Switzerland, Czech Republic
The Waldheim Waltz	Waldheims Walzer	Ruth Beckermann	Austria

=== Icons ===
English title	Original title	Director(s)	Production countrie(s)
Black '47		Lance Daly	Ireland, Luxembourg
Boy Erased		Joel Edgerton	United States
The Front Runner		Jason Reitman	United States
Life Itself		Dan Fogelman	United States
Lizzie		Craig William Macneill	United States
Manto		Nandita Das	India
The Mountain		Rick Alverson	United States
The Old Man & the Gun		David Lowery	United States
The Summer House	Les Estivants	Valeria Bruni Tedeschi	France, Italy
Suspiria		Luca Guadagnino	Italy, United States, Germany
The Trouble with You	En Liberté	Pierre Salvadori	France
The World Is Yours	Le monde est à Toi	Romain Gavras	France
Vision		Naomi Kawase	Japan

=== Impact ===
English title	Original title	Director(s)	Production countrie(s)
Birds of Passage	Pájaros de Verano	Ciro Guerra, Cristina Gallego	Colombia, Mexico, Denmark, France
Cold Sweat	Araghe Sard	Soheil Beiraghi	Iran
Core of the World	Serdtse mira	Natalia Meshchaninova	Russia, Lithuania
Donbass		Sergei Loznitsa	Germany, Ukraine, France, Netherlands, Romania
Los Silencios		Beatriz Seigner	Brazil, Colombia, France
Manta Ray	Kraben Rahu	Phuttiphong Aroonpheng	Thailand, France, China
Ray & Liz		Richard Billingham	United Kingdom
Vox Lux		Brady Corbet	United States

=== Open Zone ===
English title	Original title	Director(s)	Production countrie(s)
Asako I & II		Ryusuke Hamaguchi	Japan, France
Burning	Beoning	Lee Chang-dong	South Korea
Charlie Says		Mary Harron	United States
Cold War	Żimna Wojna	Paweł Pawlikowski	Poland, France, United Kingdom
Dear Son	Weldi	Mohamed Ben Attia	Tunisia, Belgium, France, Qatar
El Angel		Luis Ortega	Argentina, Spain
Everybody Knows	Todos lo saben	Asghar Farhadi	Spain, France, Italy
The Fall of the American Empire	La Chute de l´empire américain	Denys Arcand	Canada
A Family Tour		Ying Lang	Taiwan, Hong Kong, Singapore, Malaysia
The Favourite		Yorgos Lanthimos	Ireland, United Kingdom, United States
Float Like a Butterfly		Carmel Winters	Ireland
The Good Girls	Las niñas bien	Marquez Abella	Mexico
Happy New Year, Colin Burstead		Ben Wheatley	United Kingdom
Hotel by the River	Gang-byun Hotel	Hong Sang-soo	South Korea
In the Aisles	In den Gängen	Thomas Stuber	Germany
Let Me Fall	Lof mér að falla	Baldvin Zophoníasson	Iceland
Mirai	未来のミライ	Mamoru Hosoda	Japan
Night/Ext	Leil Khargi	Ahmad Abdalla	Egypt
Shock Waves: "Diary of My Mind"	Onde de choc, Journal de ma tête	Ursula Meier	Switzerland
Shoplifters	万引き家族	Hirokazu Kore-eda	Japan
Sibel		Guillaume Giovanetti, Çagla Zencirci	Turkey, Germany, France, Luxembourg
The Wild Pear Tree	Ahlat ağacı	Nuri Bilge Ceylan	Turkey

== Awards ==
The following awards were presented during the 29th edition:

- Best Film (Bronze Horse): Firecrackers by Jasmin Mozaffari
- Best Director: Eva Trobisch for All Good
- Best Debut: Skate Kitchen by Crystal Moselle
- Best Script: Capernaum by Nadine Labaki, Jihad Hojeily, Michelle Kesrouani, Georges Khabbaz, and Khaled Mouzanar
- Best Actress: Michaela Kurimsky for Firecrackers
- Best Actor: Victor Polster for Girl
- Best Cinematography: Hiroshi Okayama for Jesus
- Best Documentary: Putin's Witnesses by Vitaly Mansky
- Best Short Film: Judgement by Raymund Ribay Gutierrez
- FIPRESCI Award: Cold War by Paweł Pawlikowski
- Rising Star: Alba August
- Impact Award: Beatriz Seigner for Los Silencios
- Audience Award: Capernaum by Nadine Labaki

=== Lifetime Achievement Award ===
- Mary Harron

=== Achievement Award ===
- Gunnel Lindblom

=== Visionary Award ===
- Asghar Farhadi
