= Jean-Marc Vallée DGC Discovery Award =

The Jean-Marc Vallée DGC Discovery Award is an annual Canadian award, presented by the Directors Guild of Canada to honour works by emerging filmmakers.

Presented for the first time in 2016, the award is given primarily to filmmakers making their first or second feature films in any genre; however, more established filmmakers are also eligible for their first film outside their usual genre, such as a narrative filmmaker making their first documentary film or vice versa. An initial longlist of between 10 and 15 nominees is announced, which is then reduced to a shortlist of four to six films, before the award is presented at the annual DGC award gala.

Formerly presented as the DGC Discovery Award, it was renamed in 2022 in memory of director Jean-Marc Vallée following his death in December 2021.

== Winners and nominees ==
Year	Film	Director	Result	Ref
2016
2016	Before the Streets (Avant les rues)	Chloé Leriche	Winner	
2017
2017	Luk'Luk'I	Wayne Wapeemukwa	Winner	
2017	All You Can Eat Buddha	Ian Lagarde	Shortlist	
2017	Mass for Shut-Ins	Winston DeGiobbi	Shortlist	
2017	Never Steady, Never Still	Kathleen Hepburn	Shortlist	
2017	Adventures in Public School	Kyle Rideout	Longlist	
2017	Allure	Carlos and Jason Sanchez	Longlist	
2017	Ava	Sadaf Foroughi	Longlist	
2017	Black Cop	Cory Bowles	Longlist	
2017	The Crescent	Seth A. Smith	Longlist	
2017	Gregoire	Cody Bown	Longlist	
2017	Indian Horse	Stephen Campanelli	Longlist	
2017	Maison du Bonheur	Sofia Bohdanowicz	Longlist	
2017	Still Night, Still Light (Mes nuits feront écho)	Sophie Goyette	Longlist	
2017	Suck It Up	Jordan Canning	Longlist	
2017	Sweet Virginia	Jamie M. Dagg	Longlist	
2018
2018	Fausto	Andrea Bussmann	Winner	
2018	Edge of the Knife (SG̲aawaay Ḵ'uuna)	Gwaai Edenshaw, Helen Haig-Brown	Shortlist	
2018	Firecrackers	Jasmin Mozaffari	Shortlist	
2018	A Little Wisdom	Yuqi Kang	Shortlist	
2018	Ville Neuve	Félix Dufour-Laperrière	Shortlist	
2018	Clara	Akash Sherman	Longlist	
2018	Family First (Chien de garde)	Sophie Dupuis	Longlist	
2018	Freaks	Zach Lipovsky, Adam Stein	Longlist	
2018	Giant Little Ones	Keith Behrman	Longlist	
2018	Incredible Violence	Gaelen Patrick Condon	Longlist	
2018	M/M	Drew Lint	Longlist	
2018	The Museum of Forgotten Triumphs	Bojan Bodružić	Longlist	
2018	The New Romantic	Carly Stone	Longlist	
2018	Take Light	Shasha Nakhai	Longlist	
2018	Transformer	Michael Del Monte	Longlist	
2019			Longlist	
2019	Nîpawistamâsowin: We Will Stand Up	Tasha Hubbard	Winner	
2019	Black Conflux	Nicole Dorsey	Shortlist	
2019	Murmur	Heather Young	Shortlist	
2019	Raf	Harry Cepka	Shortlist	
2019	The Twentieth Century	Matthew Rankin	Shortlist	
2019	Blood Quantum	Jeff Barnaby	Longlist	
2019	Castle in the Ground	Joey Klein	Longlist	
2019	Drag Kids	Megan Wennberg	Longlist	
2019	A Kandahar Away	Aisha Jamal	Longlist	
2019	L.A. Tea Time	Sophie Bédard Marcotte	Longlist	
2019	The Rest of Us	Aisling Chin-Yee	Longlist	
2019	There's Something in the Water	Elliot Page, Ian Daniel	Longlist	
2020
2020	Beans	Tracey Deer	Winner	
2020	Inconvenient Indian	Michelle Latimer	Shortlist	
2020	No Ordinary Man	Aisling Chin-Yee, Chase Joynt	Shortlist	
2020	Violation	Madeleine Sims-Fewer, Dusty Mancinelli	Shortlist	
2020	La Contemplation du mystère	Albéric Aurtenèche	Longlist	
2020	Don't Worry, the Doors Will Open	Oksana Karpovych	Longlist	
2020	The Forbidden Reel	Ariel Nasr	Longlist	
2020	Happy Place	Helen Shaver	Longlist	
2020	Kenbe la, Until We Win (Kenbe la, jusqu’à la victoire)	Will Prosper	Longlist	
2020	Little Orphans	Ruth Lawrence	Longlist	
2020	Monkey Beach	Loretta Todd	Longlist	
2020	Queen of the Morning Calm	Gloria Ui Young Kim	Longlist	
2020	Vagrant	Caleb Ryan	Longlist	
2020	The Walrus and the Whistleblower	Nathalie Bibeau	Longlist	
2021
2021	Night Raiders	Danis Goulet	Winner	
2021	The Noise of Engines (Le Bruit des moteurs)	Philippe Grégoire	Shortlist	
2021	Wildhood	Bretten Hannam	Shortlist	
2021	Without Havana (Sin la Habana)	Kaveh Nabatian	Shortlist	
2021	Bootlegger	Caroline Monnet	Longlist	
2021	Fortitude (La Fortaleza)	Jorge Thielen Armand	Longlist	
2021	Kímmapiiyipitssini: The Meaning of Empathy	Elle-Máijá Tailfeathers	Longlist	
2021	Learn to Swim	Thyrone Tommy	Longlist	
2021	Night Blooms	Stephanie Joline	Longlist	
2021	One of Ours	Yasmine Mathurin	Longlist	
2021	Portraits from a Fire	Trevor Mack	Longlist	
2021	Ste. Anne	Rhayne Vermette	Longlist	
2021	Subjects of Desire	Jennifer Holness	Longlist	
2022			Longlist	
2022	Riceboy Sleeps	Anthony Shim	Winner	
2022	Queens of the Qing Dynasty	Ashley McKenzie	Shortlist	
2022	Rosie	Gail Maurice	Shortlist	
2022	Slash/Back	Nyla Innuksuk	Shortlist	
2022	Something You Said Last Night	Luis De Filippis	Shortlist	
2022	When Morning Comes	Kelly Fyffe-Marshall	Shortlist	
2022	Anyox	Ryan Ermacora, Jessica Johnson	Longlist	
2022	Before I Change My Mind	Trevor Anderson	Longlist	
2022	Broken Angel (MaaShwaKanManiTo)	Jules Arita Koostachin	Longlist	
2022	Dark Nature	Berkley Brady	Longlist	
2022	Framing Agnes	Chase Joynt	Longlist	
2022	Francheska: Prairie Queen	Laura O'Grady	Longlist	
2022	Geographies of Solitude	Jacquelyn Mills	Longlist	
2022	Golden Delicious	Jason Karman	Longlist	
2022	Reset	Min Bae	Longlist	
2022	This House (Cette maison)	Miryam Charles	Longlist	
2022	Until Branches Bend	Sophie Jarvis	Longlist	
2023
2023	Humanist Vampire Seeking Consenting Suicidal Person (Vampire humaniste cherche suicidaire consentant)	Ariane Louis-Seize	Winner	
2023	Atikamekw Suns (Soleils Atikamekw)	Chloé Leriche	Shortlist	
2023	Hey, Viktor!	Cody Lightning	Shortlist	
2023	In Flames	Zarrar Kahn	Shortlist	
2023	The Queen of My Dreams	Fawzia Mirza	Shortlist	
2023	Aitamaako'tamisskapi Natosi: Before the Sun	Banchi Hanuse	Longlist	
2023	Coaching While Black	Alex Eskandarkhah	Longlist	
2023	Gabor	Joannie Lafrenière	Longlist	
2023	I'm Just Here for the Riot	Kathleen Jayme, Asia Youngman	Longlist	
2023	Seagrass	Meredith Hama-Brown	Longlist	
2023	With Love and a Major Organ	Kim Albright	Longlist	
2024
2024	Seeds	Kaniehtiio Horn	Winner	
2024	7 Beats per Minute	Yuqi Kang	Shortlist	
2024	Sweet Angel Baby	Melanie Oates	Shortlist	
2024	Universal Language	Matthew Rankin	Shortlist	
2024	You Are Not Alone (Vous n'êtes pas seuls)	Marie-Hélène Viens, Philippe Lupien	Shortlist	
2024	A French Youth (Une jeunesse française)	Jérémie Battaglia	Longlist	
2024	Inedia	Liz Cairns	Longlist	
2024	Lovely	Serville Poblete	Longlist	
2024	Monica's News	Pamela Gallant	Longlist	
2024	Seguridad	Tamara Segura	Longlist	
2024	Simply Johanne (Johanne, tout simplement)	Nadine Valcin	Longlist	
2024	Young Werther	José Lourenço	Longlist	
2025
2025	Siksikakowan: The Blackfoot Man	Sinakson Trevor Solway	Winner	
2025	Blue Heron	Sophy Romvari	Shortlist	
2025	Dinner with Friends	Sasha Leigh Henry	Shortlist	
2025	Foreigner	Ava Maria Safai	Shortlist	
2025	The Train (Le Train)	Marie Brassard	Shortlist	
2025	100 Sunset	Kunsang Kyirong	Longlist	
2025	Agatha's Almanac	Amalie Atkins	Longlist	
2025	Bedrock	Kinga Michalska	Longlist	
2025	Blueberry Grunt	Sherry White	Longlist	
2025	Circo	Lamia Chraibi	Longlist	
2025	Endless Cookie	Peter Scriver, Seth Scriver	Longlist	
2025	Follies (Folichonneries)	Eric K. Boulianne	Longlist	
2025	Little Lorraine	Andy Hines	Longlist	
2025	Nika and Madison	Eva Thomas	Longlist	
2025	The Track	Ryan Sidhoo	Longlist	
2026
2026	Seahorse	Aisha Evelyna	Winner	
2026	Black Zombie	Maya Annik Bedward	Shortlist	
2026	Ceremony	Banchi Hanuse	Shortlist	
2026	In the Heart of the South	Nyla Innuksuk	Shortlist	
2026	Toy Gun Bandit (Faux gun bandit)	Rémi St-Michel	Shortlist	
2026	Aki	Darlene Naponse	Longlist	
2026	Clubfoot	Nathan Donovan	Longlist	
2026	Jersey Boy	Jaskaran Singh	Longlist	
2026	Levers	Rhayne Vermette	Longlist	
2026	Manhunt	Wayne Wapeemukwa	Longlist	
2026	Paradise	Jérémy Comte	Longlist	
2026	Purgatory	Lindsay Lanzilotta	Longlist	
2026	The Snake	Jenna MacMillan	Longlist	
2026	Still Night, Burning House	Carol Nguyen	Longlist	
2026	A Thousand Colours (Recomposée)	Nadia Louis-Desmarchais	Longlist	
