= Body and Bones =

- Directed by: Melanie Oates
- Screenplay by: Melanie Oates
- Produced by: Chris Hatcher; Melanie Oates
- Starring: Kelly Van der Burg; Joel Thomas Hynes; Lawrence Barry
- Cinematography: Jordan Kennington
- Edited by: James Vandewater
- Music by: Neil Haverty
- Production company: Chara Pictures
- Distributed by: Game Theory Films
- Release date: September 15, 2019 (AIFF)
- Running time: 97 minutes
- Country: Canada
- Language: English

Body and Bones is a Canadian drama film, directed by Melanie Oates and released in 2019. The film stars Kelly Van der Burg as Tess Small, an 18-year-old girl mourning the death of her mother, who is offered an opportunity to escape her stifling small-town existence in a Newfoundland outport when she becomes romantically involved with Danny Sharpe (Joel Thomas Hynes), a musician who left the town long ago to pursue his career in St. John's.

The cast also includes Lawrence Barry as Tess's stepfather Gerry, as well as Ruth Lawrence, Stephen Payette, Evan Mercer, Janet Cull, Emily Corcoran, Michelle Rex Bailey, Darren Ivany, Paula Morgan, Alison Woolridge, Heather Power and Jason Bhattacharya in supporting roles.

== Production ==
Oates's full-length directorial debut, the film was shot in Witless Bay and St. John's.

== Release ==
The film premiered at the 2019 Atlantic International Film Festival.

It was subsequently screened at the 2019 St. John's International Women's Film Festival, in the Borsos Competition program at the 2019 Whistler Film Festival, and at the 2020 Cinéfest Sudbury International Film Festival, before going into commercial release in fall 2020.
