= Little Orphans =

2020 Canadian film

- Directed by: Ruth Lawrence
- Written by: Emily Bridger
- Produced by: Jennifer Hawley; Sherry White
- Starring: Emily Bridger; Rhiannon Morgan; Marthe Bernard
- Cinematography: Stéphanie Weber Biron
- Edited by: Kimberlee McTaggart
- Music by: Justin Merdsoy
- Production company: Imagine That Productions
- Distributed by: Game Theory Films
- Release date: September 18, 2020 (AFF)
- Running time: 79 minutes
- Country: Canada
- Language: English

Little Orphans is a 2020 Canadian drama film, directed by Ruth Lawrence. The film stars Emily Bridger, Rhiannon Morgan and Marthe Bernard as Gwen, Kay and Janet, three young adult sisters whose lives have been haunted by being abandoned by their mother in childhood, who are reuniting in St. John's, Newfoundland and Labrador for Janet's wedding.

The film was written by Bridger as an adaptation of her own theatrical stage play. Its cast also includes Kyra Harper and Andy McQueen.

The film premiered at the Atlantic Film Festival on September 18, 2020, and was screened in October at the St. John's International Women's Film Festival. In December it was screened at the Whistler Film Festival, where it won the Borsos Competition award for Best Canadian Film. The film was also nominated for the Directors Guild of Canada's DGC Discovery Award.
