= Michaela Kurimsky =

Canadian actress and filmmaker (born 1992)

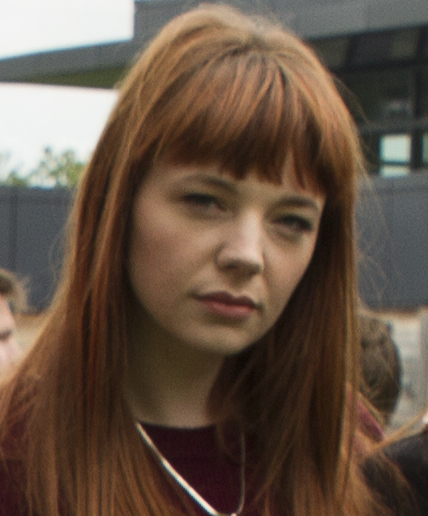
- Kurimsky in 2018
- Born: August 3, 1992 (age 34); Toronto, Ontario, Canada
- Occupations: Actress; filmmaker
- Years active: 2014–present

Michaela Kurimsky (born August 3, 1992) is a Canadian actress and filmmaker. She is known for starring in Jasmin Mozaffari's debut feature film, Firecrackers, which premiered at the 2018 Toronto International Film Festival. For her work on the film, Kurimsky received critical acclaim and won the award for Best Actress at the Stockholm International Film Festival.

== Early life ==
Kurimsky was born and raised in Canada and studied acting, writing, and film before deciding to pursue a career as an actress. She graduated from Ryerson University with a BFA in film studies.

== Career ==
In 2014, Kurimsky wrote and directed a short film called Alouette. After that, she worked various jobs both in front of and behind the camera. She worked primarily as a production designer.

In 2018, Kurimsky made her feature film acting debut opposite Karena Evans in Jasmin Mozaffari's debut feature film, Firecrackers, which premiered at the 2018 Toronto International Film Festival. That year, Kurimsky was also named one of the festival's annual "Rising Stars". The film and Kurimsky's performance were critically acclaimed. The Los Angeles Times called her performance "astounding", while NOW Magazine dubbed her "magnetic."

For her work in Firecrackers, Kurimsky received several accolades. She won Best Actress at the Stockholm International Film Festival, "for a "dangerous, sensitive, explosive, strong, intelligent, unpredictable, creative and complex" performance." She was also nominated for the Best Actress in a Canadian Film award by the Vancouver Film Critics Circle.

She subsequently starred as Mona Blackmore in A Fire in the Cold Season, a drama directed by Justin Oakey. The film screened at the Atlantic Film Festival and the Cinefest Sudbury International Film Festival.

Kurimsky starred opposite Deragh Campbell in Hannah Cheeseman's short film, Succor, which was an official selection for the 2020 Toronto International Film Festival.

She received a Canadian Screen Award nomination for Best Lead Performance in a Drama Film at the 14th Canadian Screen Awards in 2026, for her performance in Sweet Angel Baby.

== Filmography ==
=== As an actress ===
==== Short films ====
- Set No Path (2013)
- Sequela (2015)
- Blind Arcade (2017)
- Succor (2020)
- Menace (2022)

==== Feature films ====
- Firecrackers (2018)
- A Fire in the Cold Season (2019)
- The Boathouse (2021)
- Sweet Angel Baby (2024)
- Strong Son (2026)

Television

- Hudson & Rex (2020)
