= Karena Evans =

Canadian director and actress

- Born: December 17, 1995 (age 30); Toronto, Ontario, Canada
- Occupations: Music video director; TV director; actress
- Years active: 2016–present
- Website: karenaevans.com

Karena Evans (born December 17, 1995) is a Canadian director and actress. She garnered recognition for directing the music videos for Drake's 2018 Billboard Hot 100 chart-topping singles, "God's Plan", "Nice for What", and "In My Feelings". Evans also directed Kendrick Lamar and Sza's video for their number 1, hit single 'Luther' in 2025. Evans won the 2018 Much Music Video Award for Best Director and became the first woman to receive the Prism Prize's Lipsett Award for music video direction.

Evans has acted in the television series Mary Kills People and had a starring role in the 2018 indie film Firecrackers, which premiered at the 2018 Toronto International Film Festival. In 2020, Evans directed the premiere episode for the Starz drama series P-Valley. She directed an episode each of the fourth and fifth seasons of the FX crime drama Snowfall, and she directed the first two episodes of the HBO Max Gossip Girl reboot.

== Career ==
=== Directing ===
Evans began her career in the music industry as an intern for Director X. She was eventually signed as a director to his music video production company, Popprok. Since then, Evans has directed music videos for numerous artists, including Belly and Sean Paul. She has also directed commercials for Nike, Inc., including a Black Lives Matter short for the brand.

Evans garnered attention in early 2018 when she directed the music video for Drake's single "God's Plan"; the video went viral and the song reached number one on the Billboard Hot 100. The video depicts Drake donating his $1 million production budget to the people of Miami. Evans subsequently directed his "Nice for What" music video, which garnered critical acclaim from several publications. Evans referred to the video as a "celebration of women", as the video featured iconic female stars such as Olivia Wilde and Issa Rae. Vogue lauded Evans as "surely destined to be the starriest young video director in the firmament". Later that year, she became the first woman to win the Prism Prize's Lipsett Award for music video direction. That year, Director X posted a congratulations to Evans with this caption:

"@karenaevans started as an intern. She stayed longer worked harder than everyone else. From intern to director at my company. Last year grinding on low budget jobs giving big budget results. This year she’s directed @champagnepapi God’s Plan & the new single Nice For What. When work ethic is matched by talent. Big up the team @popp_rok for pulling this wide ranging job off. Here’s some bts footage for all y’all 🙌🏽 (feel like a Dad video taping his daughter at a recital when ever I come to set)"

In May 2018, SZA released a music video featuring Donald Glover for her song "Garden (Say It Like That)", which was directed by Evans. Evans signed with WME later that month. That summer, she also directed the music videos for Drake's singles "I'm Upset" and "In My Feelings".

In late 2018, Evans earned Much Music Video Award and MTV Video Music Award nominations for her work on Drake's videos. She ultimately won Best Director at the 2018 iHeartRadio MMVAs for her work on "God's Plan". In 2020, Evans was placed on BET's "Future 40" list, which is a list of “40 of the most inspiring and innovative vanguards who are redefining what it means to be unapologetically young, gifted, and black”.

=== Acting ===
As an actress, Evans began her career in 2016 with a role in a short film called WhiteWoods. In 2018, she starred in two feature films, Michael Sucsy's Every Day and Jasmin Mozaffari's Firecrackers, opposite Michaela Kurimsky, the latter of which premiered at the 2018 Toronto International Film Festival. That same year, she also performed a recurring role in the Canadian television series Mary Kills People.

== Influences ==
Evans is the younger sister of Jordan Evans, a producer who has worked with several successful artists, and was inspired by him to pursue her passion. Evans has stated that she is heavily influenced by Melina Matsoukas, whom she called her "hero" in an interview with Billboard. Evans hopes to be an inspiration for other young black women from her hometown of Toronto.

== Filmography ==
=== Film ===
Year	Title	Role
2016	Delta State: Slipping Into the Future	Sonya / Jodi Collins
2018	Every Day	Hannah / A
2018	Firecrackers	Chantal

=== TV ===
Year	Show	Actor	Director	Notes
2018	Mary Kills People	Yes	No	Recurring Role (5 episodes)
2020	P-Valley	No	Yes	Episode #1.1
2020	Swipe Night	No	Yes	Episode #2.1
2021-2022	Snowfall	No	Yes	Episodes #4.2 and #5.9
2021	Y: The Last Man	No	Yes	Episode #1.8
2021	Gossip Girl	No	Yes	Episodes #1.1 and #1.2
2023	Dead Ringers	No	Yes	Episode #3
2024	Mr. & Mrs. Smith	No	Yes	Episodes #1.3 and #1.5
2026	Furious	No	Yes	Episodes #1.3 and #1.4
2026	Blade Runner 2099	No	Yes	Post-production

=== Music videos ===
Year	Song	Artist	Notes
2017	"Mumble Rap"	Belly	
2017	"The Come Down Is Real Too"	Belly	
2017	"Run This"	PLAZA	
2018	"God's Plan"	Drake	
2018	"Nice For What"	Drake	
2018	"D'Evils"	SiR	
2018	"Garden (Say It Like Dat)"	SZA	
2018	"I'm Upset"	Drake	
2018	"In My Feelings"	Drake	
2018	"Tap Out"	Jay Rock	
2019	“Everyday Life”	Coldplay	
2021	"Have Mercy"	Chlöe	
2025	"Luther"	Kendrick Lamar and SZA	
