= Sinakson Trevor Solway =

Sinakson Trevor Solway is a Blackfoot film and television director from Canada. He is most noted for his 2025 documentary film Siksikakowan: The Blackfoot Man, which was the winner of the Jean-Marc Vallée DGC Discovery Award at the 2025 Directors Guild of Canada awards.

A member of the Siksika Nation in Alberta, he is currently based in Calgary. He began his career in the 2010s with Siksika Strong, a short documentary about the Siksika Nation's recovery from the 2013 Alberta floods. He has since directed short documentary films and episodes of television series including Absolutely Canadian, Stuff the British Stole and Tales from the Rez, before releasing Siksikakowan: The Blackfoot Man in 2025 as his theatrical feature documentary debut.
