= Tika Simone =

Canadian rhythm and blues singer

Tika Simone, also sometimes credited as TiKA, is a Canadian rhythm and blues singer.

She is noted as a winner of the Canadian Screen Award for Best Original Song, at the 10th Canadian Screen Awards in 2022 for "And Then We Don't", a song she co-wrote with Casey Manierka-Quaile for Thyrone Tommy's debut feature-length film Learn to Swim.

A prominent performer on Toronto's live music scene since the early 2010s, she released her full-length debut album, Anywhere But Here, in 2021.
