= Incredible Violence =

- Directed by: G. Patrick Condon
- Written by: G. Patrick Condon; Ross Moore
- Produced by: G. Patrick Condon; Walter Lawlor; Ian Vatcher
- Starring: Stephen Oates; M. J. Kehler
- Cinematography: Ian Vatcher
- Edited by: Justin Oakey
- Music by: Adam Foran
- Production company: The Hunting Party
- Release date: September 2018 (AIFF)
- Running time: 92 minutes
- Country: Canada
- Language: English

Incredible Violence is a Canadian comedy horror film, directed by G. Patrick Condon and released in 2018. The film stars Steven Oates as a fictionalized version of Condon, an aspiring filmmaker who squanders all of the money he borrowed to make his first film and tries to salvage the production by sequestering all of his actors on set and actually killing them himself, and M. J. Kehler as Grace, his lead actress who has to fight back to save her own life.

The cast also includes Michael Worthman, Kimberley Drake, Erin Mick, Meghan Hancock, Allison Moira Kelly, Patrick Foran, Ruth Lawrence and Stephen Lush.

== Distribution ==
The film was screened in May 2018 at the Cannes Film Market, and had its public premiere at the 2018 Atlantic International Film Festival.

It was released to video on demand platforms in 2019.

== Critical reception ==
Bobby LePire of Film Threat wrote that the metafictional device of Condon writing himself into the screenplay as the villain added nothing to the film, but that the main plot made for a solid slasher film on its own without the unnecessary framing. He ultimately concluded that "there is a steadily growing sense of menace that begins once everyone arrives at the house to start filming. This explodes into an orgy of violence within the last 30-minutes. Incredible Violence becomes a sly commentary on the enjoyment of violent media, while itself offering those same visceral thrills. It is a dichotomy that does not always work in movies. But here, thanks to a strong screenplay, compelling characters, and impressive direction, it does not come across as hypocritical preaching."

== Awards ==
The film was a longlisted nominee for the DGC Discovery Award in 2018.
