= Mariner (film) =

2016 Canadian film

- Film poster
- Directed by: Thyrone Tommy
- Written by: Thyrone Tommy
- Produced by: Alona Metzer; Thyrone Tommy
- Starring: Thomas Antony Olajide
- Cinematography: Nick Haight
- Edited by: Christine Armstrong
- Music by: Erica Procunier
- Production company: Leilani Films
- Release date: September 9, 2016 (TIFF)
- Running time: 19 min.
- Country: Canada
- Language: English

Mariner is a Canadian short drama film, directed by Thyrone Tommy and released in 2016. The film stars Thomas Antony Olajide as Nate, a Black Canadian student at a naval academy who begins to suffer anxiety attacks as he prepares for his final marine navigation exam.

The film premiered at the 2016 Toronto International Film Festival. It was named to TIFF's annual Canada's Top Ten list of the year's best Canadian short films, and won the Lindalee Tracey Award in 2017.
