= Simone Smith (Canadian film editor) =

Canadian film editor

Simone Smith is a Canadian film and television editor, who has been a three-time winner of the Canadian Screen Award for Best Editing. She won at the 7th Canadian Screen Awards in 2019 for her work on the film Firecrackers, at the 11th Canadian Screen Awards in 2023 for I Like Movies, and at the 14th Canadian Screen Awards in 2026 for Mile End Kicks.

She was previously nominated in the same category at the 6th Canadian Screen Awards in 2018 for Never Steady, Never Still.

== Filmography ==
=== Film ===
Year	Title	Work		Note
Year	Title	Editor	Producer	Note
2013	Everyday Is Like Sunday (film)	Yes	No	
2017	Adam's Testament	Yes	No	
2017	Never Steady, Never Still	Yes	No	
2017	Kayak to Klemtu	Yes	No	
2018	Firecrackers	Yes	No	
2019	Goalie	Yes	No	
2019	Spinster	Yes	No	
2020	Happy Place	Yes	No	
2022	Slash/Back	Yes	No	
2022	I Like Movies	Yes	Associate	
2023	The Queen of My Dreams	Yes	No	
2025	Mile End Kicks	Yes	Associate	
2025	Meadowlarks	Yes	No	

=== Television ===
Year	Title	Work	Note
Year	Title	Editor	Note
2017	Running with Violet	Yes	3 episodes
2017	That's My DJ	Yes	8 episodes
2021	SurrealEstate	Yes	4 episodes
2021-2022	Strays	Yes	10 episodes
2025	Bet	Yes	3 episodes

== Accolades ==
Award	Year	Category	Work	Result	Ref.
Canadian Screen Award	2017	Best Editing	Never Steady, Never Still	Nominated	
Canadian Screen Award	2018	Best Editing	Firecrackers	Won	
Canadian Screen Award	2019	Best Editing	Goalie	Nominated	
Canadian Screen Award	2021	Editing in a drama program or series	SurrealEstate	Nominated	
Canadian Screen Award	2022	Best Editing	I Like Movies	Won	
Canadian Screen Award	2025	Best Editing	Mile End Kicks	Won	
Canadian Screen Award	2025	Editing in a drama program or series	Bet	Nominated	
Directors Guild of Canada	2019	Best Picture Editing – Feature Film	Firecrackers	Nominated	
Directors Guild of Canada	2022	Best Picture Editing – Feature Film	Slash/Back	Nominated	
Directors Guild of Canada	2023	Best Picture Editing – Feature Film	I Like Movies	Nominated	
Directors Guild of Canada	2025	Best Picture Editing – Feature Film	Meadowlarks	Nominated	
