= A Fire in the Cold Season =

2019 Canadian film directed by Justin Oakey

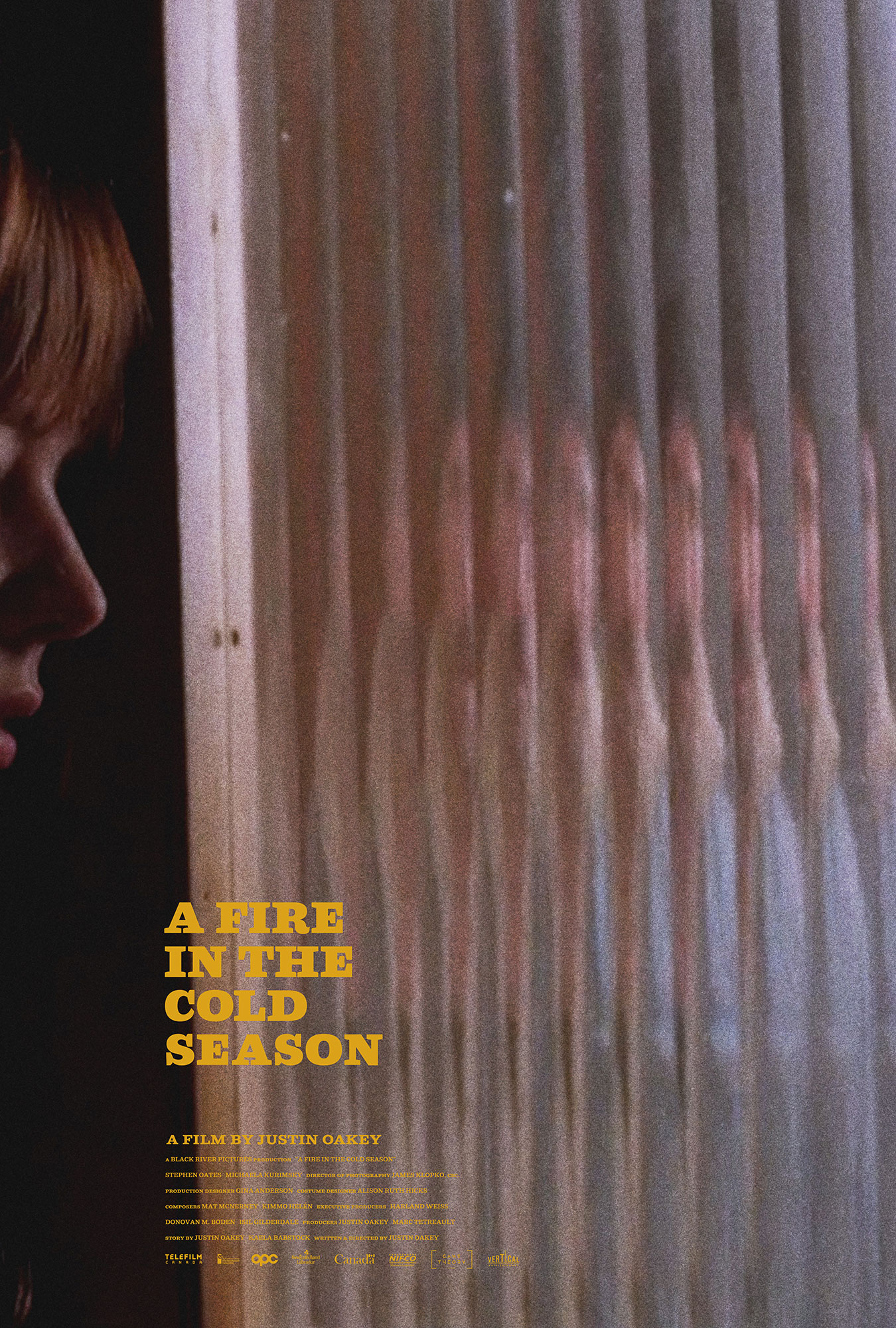
- Theatrical release poster
- Directed by: Justin Oakey
- Written by: Justin Oakey
- Story by: Kaela Babstock; Justin Oakey
- Produced by: Marc Tétrault; Justin Oakey
- Starring: Stephen Oates; Michaela Kurimsky
- Cinematography: James Klopko
- Edited by: Justin Oakey
- Music by: Mat McNerney; Kimmo Helén
- Production companies: Black River Pictures; OPC
- Distributed by: Game Theory Films; Vertical Entertainment; Velvet Spoon
- Release date: September 13, 2019 (FIN)
- Running time: 94 minutes
- Country: Canada
- Language: English

A Fire in the Cold Season is a 2019 Canadian thriller drama film, directed by Justin Oakey. The film stars Stephen Oates as Scott, an introverted trapper who has discovered a dead body, and Michaela Kurimsky as Mona, the dead man's pregnant widow. It received praise for its cinematography, intricate original score, as well as its "artful, genre-bending approach" to the backwoods thriller.

The film premiered on September 13, 2019 at the Atlantic International Film Festival. It subsequently had its international premiere in Iceland, and continued to screen at festivals during the COVID-19 pandemic, before a delated theatrical and digital release in Canada (October 2020). It has since been released internationally, in dozens of countries.

James Klopko received a Canadian Screen Award nomination for Best Cinematography at the 9th Canadian Screen Awards in 2021.
