= José Lourenço =

Canadian filmmaker

José Lourenço, sometimes credited as José Avelino Gilles Corbett Lourenço, is a Canadian filmmaker based in Toronto, Ontario, whose debut feature film Young Werther premiered in 2024.

Born in Antigonish, Nova Scotia, he lived Halifax, Edmonton and Vancouver Island in childhood. He subsequently moved to Toronto, where he was a singer and guitarist in the indie rock band Spitfires & Mayflowers, a writer for the Toronto Star, and a television writer for MuchMusic and CBC Television productions such as The Hour, the MuchMusic Video Awards and Farm Crime. He also sold a screenplay to Fox Searchlight in the 2000s, although the film was never ultimately released.

He subsequently directed music videos and short films, receiving a Juno Award nomination for Video of the Year for The Rural Alberta Advantage's "Stamp" at the Juno Awards of 2012, and a Canadian Screen Award nomination for Best Original Program or Series, Fiction Produced for Digital Media for What Are the Sevens? at the 1st Canadian Screen Awards in 2013.

Young Werther premiered at the 2024 Toronto International Film Festival, before going into commercial release in January 2025. The film was longlisted for the 2024 Jean-Marc Vallée DGC Discovery Award.

His book Billie Builds a Robocorn was a finalist for the Governor General's Award for Young People's Literature - Illustrated Books at the 2026 Governor General's Awards.
