= 7 Beats per Minute =

2024 documentary film

- Film poster
- Directed by: Yuqi Kang
- Written by: Yuqi Kang
- Produced by: Ina Fichman
- Starring: Jessea Lu
- Cinematography: Kalina Bertin; Alexandre Lampron; Scott Alexander Ruderman
- Edited by: Dominique Champagne
- Music by: Mario Sévigny; Lauren Bélec; Frannie Holder
- Production companies: Intuitive Pictures; Five Fifty Five; Rainshine Entertainment
- Distributed by: National Film Board of Canada
- Release date: 8 March 2024 (SXSW)
- Running time: 100 minutes
- Country: Canada
- Languages: English; Mandarin

7 Beats per Minute is a 2024 Canadian documentary film, directed by Yuqi Kang. The film is a portrait of Jessea Lu, the Chinese freediver who nearly died during a 2018 attempt to set a world record in her sport. The film examines Lu's experience as an athlete and the emotional effects of the incident, as well as the filmmaker's journey as Kang becomes a participant in Lu's story.

The film premiered on 8 March 2024 at SXSW and had its Canadian premiere on 26 April at the Hot Docs Canadian International Documentary Festival.

== Synopsis ==
In voiceover, director Yuqi Kang introduces freediving as an experience which awakens primitive physiological and psychological responses. The pressure of a descent causes blood to contract toward the organs and the heart rate to slow. Champion freediver Jessea Lu states that her consciousness also contracts, feeling safe and content, and allowing her to examine her fears and emotional responses. She says that the "otherworldly" experience allowed her to learn more about herself and the therapeutic benefits help her lead a more enjoyable life.

While studying to be a pharmacologist, Jessea took a college scuba-diving course and then moved into freediving, analyzing and practicing its techniques to a high aptitude. She developed a static breath hold of over 10 minutes which earned her the title of "freediving goddess" and accompanied an Antarctic expedition as a research diver. She began competing almost immediately, earning two dozen diving medals, most from 2016 to 2018 when she was focusing on performance results. (Note: Lu won 15 gold medals in international freediving competitions.)

In 2018, while attempting to set a world record 93-metre (305 ft) dive during the Vertical Blue diving competition at Dean's Blue Hole in the Bahamas, she falters near the top of her ascent and experiences a freediving blackout. Safety divers intervene, initiate rescue breathing, and bring her to the diving platform. Several minutes pass (Note: Sources vary at about 4 or about 8 minutes. It seems that her dive time was about 4 minutes and she was given rescue breathing for 4 minutes. Thus she was blacked out for about 4 minutes but it had been about 8 minutes since she had taken a breath on her own.) before she is responsive and breathing on her own.

Jessea describes having a near-death experience in which she felt she was dead but her consciousness was "crispy clear and calm". Her life had flashed before her eyes and looking at herself from an outside perspective, she felt "that body lying there is so sad" and that she had to go back and take care of that person. Jessea realized that she had felt unhappy and unloved since the divorce of her parents. She describes her childhood as abusive and miserable, including a suicide attempt.

Jessea prepares to return to diving at Vertical Blue in 2022, to face her "emotional monsters" of failure and helplessness mixed with childhood traumas. At her home in Hawaii, she spear-fishes and cooks dinner for herself and Kang, the two women having developed a close relationship. Asked to support Jessea as her safety diver, Kang undertakes a difficult training course, coming close to a blackout as she pushes herself to her limits.

Kang realizes that she has not maintained a professional distance between documentarian and subject, and that it is becoming more difficult to simply observe as she takes on a significant role in Jessea's story. Jessea and Kang discuss the situation: Kang being concerned about finishing her documentary and not putting additional stress on Jessea, while Jessea is uncertain if she can attempt the dive without Kang's complete support. Kang finds herself stuck in an increasingly complex conflict of interest between her film and Jessea.

As the competition approaches, Kang asks her carmeraperson to interview Jessea. Jessea reflects on the pure connection between the diver and the safety team, never recalling another time in her life where she was allowed to do anything while someone has been fully dedicated, focused and committed to protect her life. Jessea later describes awakening from her blackout with immense gratitude at being surrounded by people concerned for her, that she felt reborn on that day and marks its anniversary as her birthday. Jessea and Kang celebrate with a small birthday cake.

Jessea surprises everyone at Vertical Blue by opting to not dive competitively. During practice dives, several divers are shown surfacing and becoming unresponsive or momentarily blacking out. Kang serves as Jessea's safety diver on several practice and official dives. On the last day of the competition, Jessea completes a dive of 89 metres (292 ft) with seeming ease. Jessea reflects on the sense of peace and acceptance she had on the dive.

As the film closes, it is revealed that Jessea has begun to reconcile with her estranged mother, and Kang makes an allusion to the sea "beckoning its children to return", to strengthen and free themselves.

== Interviewees ==
- Jessea Lu, competitive freediver and pharmacologist
- Kirk Krack, founder of Performance Freediving International
- Francesca Koe, Vertical Blue diving judge and safety supervisor
- Helena Bourdillon, freediving athlete and coach

== Production ==
The film was written and directed by Yuqi Kang. It was produced by Ina Fichman for Intuitive Pictures (Montreal) and Sherien Barsoum for the National Film Board of Canada (NFB). The film received funding from Telefilm Canada.

After finishing her first documentary, A Little Wisdom, Kang pursued an interest in freediving while looking for a related story for her next film. She researched competitive freediving and met with numerous potential documentary subjects including amateur, professional, and competitive freedivers. When they were both in China in 2019, Kang contacted Lu and arranged to meet. Lu was impressed that Kang immediately took an overnight train from Beijing to Shanghai for the meeting, and they quickly connected, talking for hours.

A couple months later, Kang travelled to Lu's home on the Island of Hawaiʻi. They planned for Kang to follow and film Lu in Asia during December 2019. However, the COVID-19 pandemic delayed the project and forced the two to quarantine for a month, during which they became close friends adjusting to lockdown together. Production resumed in 2021, and in 2022 Lu was competing again.

Kang trained for months to freedive for the filming, and became Lu's safety diver. With the intimate trust between them, Kang realized that she had become more than a storyteller. While serving as safety diver, Kang transferred directorial control to her cinematographer. Kang wrote in a director's statement: "the years we spent together filming, unexpectedly witnessing each other grow and experiencing high-pressure diving competitions, brought Jessea and me to the rawest form of ourselves. This process was life-changing". Fichman realized that the project brought out vulnerabilities in both women and made certain to provide them with mental health support.

For the majority of the filming Kang either set up her own equipment or was assisted by a crew of two people. In the Bahamas, Kang was assisted by a crew of five people, some of whom operated from small kayaks to get as close as possible to the dive platform. The freediving sequences were captured by a single diver with a camera in an underwater case. Kang used a three-person rotation with herself, Lu, and a third diver, where the person on the surface monitored the camera footage and the safety of the other two. Kang stated that the process taught her to be more flexible, particularly managing her expectations when filming in the natural environment.

Kang used long underwater shots to create an "immersive" experience of the world of freediving. Additional footage, including that of Lu's 2018 incident, was licensed from the Vertical Blue organizers, who had remotely operated cameras that were specialized for operating at competition depths. The organizers also captured specific angles and shots that Kang requested for the film.

Dialog in English and Mandarin with English subtitles. The title references the bottom point of a freediver's heart rate. The Mandarin title – 呼吸之间 – translates roughly as "between breaths".

== Release ==
The film was distributed by the NFB. Its world premiere was in the Documentary Spotlight section of the SXSW international film festival on 8 March 2024, International Women's Day. The film then had its Canadian premiere at the Hot Docs Canadian International Documentary Festival in Toronto on 27 April.

It also screened at the Vancouver International Film Festival, Windsor International Film Festival, Atlantic International Film Festival (Halifax), Chagrin Documentary Film Festival (Ohio), Available Light Film Festival (Whitehorse), Victoria Film Festival, Calgary International Film Festival.

== Critical Response ==
Andrew Parker rated the film 6 out of 10 and wrote that the "captivating" film starts as a "standard sports documentary" – having much in common with The Deepest Breath which had premiered at SXSW a year earlier – but shifts as Kang struggles with Lu's insistence that she become her safety diver. Critic and entertainment journalist Dana Gee of the Vancouver Sun wrote that the cinéma vérité techniques expose the motivations of athletes pursuing the extreme sport. Both Gee and Parker praised the film's stunning cinematography.

Writing for documentary trade magazine Point of View, Winnie Wang stated that the "intimate friendship differentiates the film from other sports documentaries, raising considerations around ethics, objectivity and care for subjects."

== Awards ==
The film (Yuqi Kang) was shortlisted for the Discovery Award for emerging filmmakers at the 2024 Directors Guild of Canada Awards.

At SXSW, designer John Godfrey won the Best Poster Design award for the film's promotional poster. The poster features an underwater image of Lu floating in a fetal position, with a yolk-like pinkish-yellow orb behind her, contrasting with the overall blue motif.

Ceremony	Category	Recipients	Result	Ref.
2024 SXSW Film Festival	Best Film Poster Design	John Godfrey	Won	
2024 Directors Guild of Canada Awards	Discovery Award	Yuqi Kang	Shortlisted	
2024 Chagrin Documentary Film Festival	Human Spirit Award	7 Beats per Minute	Won	
2024 Centre Film Festival	Gratitude Award: Sports on Screen	7 Beats per Minute	Won	
2025 Available Light Film Festival	Best Canadian Feature Film	7 Beats per Minute	Won	
