= Lakeview (film) =

- Directed by: Tara Thorne
- Written by: Tara Thorne
- Produced by: Nicole Steeves
- Starring: Lesley Smith; Hilary Adams; Nicole Steeves
- Cinematography: Chelsea Comeau
- Edited by: Amy Mielke
- Production company: Fri Bands
- Release date: September 12, 2024 (AIFF)
- Running time: 100 minutes
- Country: Canada
- Language: English

Lakeview is a Canadian comedy film, directed by Tara Thorne and released in 2024. The film stars Lesley Smith as Darcy, a bisexual woman who gathers her group of predominantly lesbian friends at her parents' lakeside cottage for emotional support while going through a divorce from her husband, only for each of the women to have their own interpersonal dramas to deal with as well, including their petty jealousies as they await the late arrival of Dax (Hilary Adams), who has recently broken out to significant fame as a singer-songwriter.

The cast also includes Nicole Steeves, Kathryn McCormack, Jessica Marie Brown, Faly Mevamanana, Stephanie Clarke and Kathleen Dorian.

== Distribution ==
The film premiered at the 2024 Atlantic International Film Festival.

Subsequent screenings included the 2025 editions of BFI Flare, the Inside Out Film and Video Festival, and the Frameline Film Festival.
