= Learn to Swim =

2021 Canadian film

- Directed by: Thyrone Tommy
- Written by: Marni Van Dyk; Thyrone Tommy
- Produced by: Alona Metzer
- Starring: Thomas Antony Olajide; Emma Ferreira
- Cinematography: Nick Haight
- Edited by: Baun Mah; Shaun Rykiss
- Music by: Chester Hansen; Leland Whitty; Tika Simone
- Production company: Leilani Films
- Distributed by: Mongrel Media
- Release date: September 11, 2021 (TIFF)
- Running time: 90 minutes
- Country: Canada
- Language: English

Learn to Swim is a Canadian drama film written by Thyrone Tommy and Marni Van Dyk and directed by Tommy in his feature-length directorial debut. The film centres on a stormy romantic relationship between Dezi (Thomas Antony Olajide) and Selma (Emma Ferreira), two talented but troubled jazz musicians.

The film premiered in the Discovery program at the 2021 Toronto International Film Festival. Both Olajide and Ferreira were named among TIFF's annual Rising Stars program for emerging actors.

== Critical response ==
Norman Wilner of Now rated the film four N's, writing that "from one angle it could be A Star Is Born; from another, maybe it's Once. But music – especially jazz – is all about taking the standards and reinterpreting them into new forms, giving us something new that we can still recognize in flashes. That's what Tommy and co-writer Marni Van Dyk are doing with Learn To Swim, scrambling time and weaving other storylines into Dezi and Selma's collaboration."

For the National Post, Chris Knight wrote that "In all honestly you could probably sit back, close your eyes and just listen to the music, but then you’d be missing out on the beautifully interwoven story of romance. After all, when someone presents you with a lovingly crafted mix tape, you don’t just listen to side one."

== Distribution ==
In 2022, the film was acquired for release on Netflix by Ava Duvernary's distribution company ARRAY.

== Awards ==
The film was a nominee for the DGC Discovery Award at the 2021 Directors Guild of Canada awards. and was named to TIFF's annual year-end Canada's Top Ten list for 2021.

The film received two Canadian Screen Award nominations at the 10th Canadian Screen Awards in 2022, for Best Actor (Olajide) and Best Original Song ("And Then We Don't" by Tika Simone and Casey Manierka-Quaile). Simone and Manierka-Quaile won Best Original Song.
