= James Klopko =

Canadian cinematographer

James Klopko is a Canadian cinematographer. He is most noted for his work on the 2019 film A Fire in the Cold Season, for which he received a Canadian Screen Award nomination for Best Cinematography at the 9th Canadian Screen Awards in 2021.

His other credits have included the films Sleeping Giant, Great Great Great, Catch and Release, An Audience of Chairs, The Last Porno Show, Boxcutter, Meadowlarks and Hangashore, and episodes of the television series What Would Sal Do? and Kim's Convenience.
