= Thomas Antony Olajide =

Canadian actor

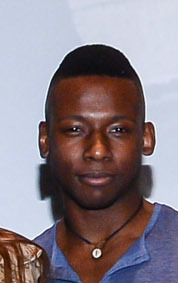
- Olajide in 2017
- Born: Thomas Antony Olajide; Vancouver, British Columbia, Canada
- Occupations: Actor, writer
- Years active: 2010s–present

Thomas Antony Olajide, sometimes also credited as Thomas Olajide, is a Canadian actor and writer from Vancouver, British Columbia. He is most noted for his performance in the 2021 film Learn to Swim, for which he received a Canadian Screen Award nomination for Best Actor at the 10th Canadian Screen Awards in 2022, and as co-creator with Tawiah M'carthy and Stephen Jackman-Torkoff of Black Boys, a theatrical show about Black Canadian LGBTQ+ identities which was staged by Buddies in Bad Times in 2016. Olajide, M'carthy, and Jackman-Torkoff were collectively nominated for Outstanding Ensemble Performance at the Dora Mavor Moore Awards in 2017.

His other stage roles have included productions of William Shakespeare's The Winter's Tale for The Dream in High Park; King Lear, A Midsummer Night's Dream and Love's Labour's Lost for the Stratford Festival; Lynn Nottage's Ruined for Canadian Stage; and Michel Nadeau's And Slowly Beauty for the Belfry Theatre and the National Arts Centre.

Olajide has also starred in the short film Mariner and the feature film White Lie. He had regular roles in the web series Inhuman Condition and Nomades, and received a Prix Gémeaux nomination for Best Actor in a Youth Digital Series in 2020 for the latter.

In 2023, he played a regular supporting role in the television series The Spencer Sisters as police officer Zane Graham. That year, he also starred in the Canadian sports film Backspot, which premiered in the Discovery program at the 2023 Toronto International Film Festival.

He is a graduate of the National Theatre School of Canada, and of the Actors Conservatory at the Canadian Film Centre.

In 2026 he won the award for Outstanding Short Film Actor at the Reelworld Film Festival, for his performance in Fine Black Frame.
