= Farm Crime =

Canadian television show

- Genre: Documentary
- Directed by: Geoff Morrison; Christina Carvalho; Ryan J. Noth; Victoria Lean; Kathleen Jayme; Stephanie Joline; Alexandra Lazarowich; Maya Annik Bedward; Conor McNally; Maya Bastian
- Narrated by: Sarah Treleaven
- Country of origin: Canada
- Original languages: English (18 episodes); French (1 episode)
- No. of seasons: 3
- No. of episodes: 18

Production
- Executive producer: Geoff Morrison
- Producers: Geoff Morrison; Christina Carvalho; Lucy Cameron
- Production locations: Victoriaville, QC; Fraser Valley; Vancouver Island; Southern Ontario; Southern Manitoba; Saskatchewan; Alberta; Nova Scotia; Prince Edward Island; Iowa
- Production company: Big Cedar Films

Original release
- Network: CBC
- Release: August 17, 2018

Farm Crime is a Canadian true crime documentary series which premiered on CBC's online streaming service, CBC Gem, in August 2018. Created by Geoff Morrison and produced by Toronto-based production company Big Cedar Films, the series investigates unconventional crimes in the world of farming and agriculture.

The series was one of the first to be commissioned exclusively for the CBC Gem streaming platform, and was reported by CBC to have been the most-streamed original unscripted series over a seven-day period and a twelve-week period when its first season premiered. In December 2020, it was announced that Warner Bros. Unscripted Television optioned the format rights to the show, and that an American version of the show is in development.

Showrunner Geoff Morrison described the Great Canadian Maple Syrup Heist as the inspiration for the show in a 2023 interview.

== Episodes ==
=== Series overview ===
The series documents the stories of people who have been victims of agricultural crime. Each 10-25 minute episode examines a different incident, usually a theft, and how it affects the victims both emotionally and financially. The series also explores the many diverse aspects of the agricultural industry in Canada, with each episode taking place in different provinces across Canada. The first season of the series tackles crimes such as cattle rustling, oyster poaching, livestock theft, and cargo theft. The second season looks at crop, lobster, and horse theft, elver poaching, and invasive species that threaten agriculture. The last season of Farm Crime covers timber poaching, agricultural fraud and scams, industry sabotage, and a case that involves the Canadian Food Inspection Agency.

==== Season 1 (2018) ====
No. in season	Title	Directed by	Original release date
1	"Cattle Cops"	Geoff Morrison	August 17, 2018
RCMP livestock investigators round up a cattle rustler who stole cattle from his employer.
2	"Hive Heist"	Ryan J. Noth	August 17, 2018
An investigation into the biggest bee theft in Canadian history, where five million bees are stolen from a family-run apiary in Quebec.
3	"George of Green Gables"	Christina Carvalho	August 17, 2018
A PEI aquaculturist is robbed of oysters while dealing with a family tragedy.
4	"Pigeon Pincher"	Geoff Morrison	August 17, 2018
After 300 fancy pigeons are stolen from a pigeon fancier in Abbotsford, BC, the theft is suspected to be connected to a rash of livestock thefts in the Fraser Valley.
5	"Black Market Butcher"	Victoria Lean	August 17, 2018
Free-range farmers in Nova Scotia are victim to a thief who butchered animals on their property.
6	"#BlueberryBandit"	Geoff Morrison	August 17, 2018
$100,000 worth of blueberries are stolen from a transport yard in Hamilton, Ontario.

==== Season 2 (2021) ====
No. in season	Title	Directed by	Original release date
1	"Invasion of the Murder Hornets"	Kathleen Jayme	April 1, 2021
Dedicated beekeepers in British Columbia discover the first "murder hornet" nest in North America, and wage war against the honeybee's deadliest natural predator.
2	"The Million Dollar Baby Eel Deal"	Stephanie Joline	April 1, 2021
After hundreds of kilograms of baby eels turn up on the black market, fisheries officers launch a sting operation to break up the trafficking ring.
3	"Missing Mare"	Alexandra Lazarowich	April 1, 2021
Struck by illness, an Ontario woman entrusts the care of her beloved horses to another horse owner, but when she goes to retrieve the animals, they're nowhere to be found.
4	"Canola Caper"	Maya Annik Bedward	April 1, 2021
A determined mountie and innovative grain scientist team up to investigate a string of suspicious canola sales, and build a case against a notorious suspect.
5	"The Lobster Looting at Long Cove"	Geoff Morrison	April 1, 2021
While a Nova Scotia lobster fisherman rings in the New Year, thieves make him the next victim in a growing rash of lobster thefts.
6	"My Father's Horses"	Conor McNally	April 1, 2021
When a Nakoda Elder discovers three of his beloved paint horses missing, he turns to his daughter, who has her own unique connection to the animals, for help.

==== Season 3 (2023) ====
No. in season	Title	Directed by	Original release date
1	"The Cedar Culprit"	Conor McNally	November 3, 2023
When Guardians from the Wei Wai Kum First Nation discover evidence of timber poaching in their territory, they sound the alarm to protect the remaining old growth and bring the poachers to justice.
2	"Pigeon Ponzi"	Maya Annik Bedward	November 3, 2023
An entrepreneurial farmer known as the Pigeon King comes up with a proposal for farmers to make money by breeding pigeons, but investigative journalists suspect his deal may be too good to be true.
3	"Fate of the Feral Rabbits"	Kathleen Jayme	November 3, 2023
An infamous colony of rescued rabbits from the University of Victoria face execution after they escape from their sanctuary onto a nearby farm, putting themselves and the farmer in the crosshairs.
4	"The Farmer & the Fraudster"	Alexandra Lazarowich	November 3, 2023
Following a string of bad cheques across Alberta and Saskatchewan, an RCMP Livestock Investigator must pin down a prolific fraudster and deliver justice to the farmers who were deceived.
5	"Sabotaged Spuds from the Bright Red Mud"	Stephanie Joline	November 3, 2023
When sewing needles start turning up in world-famous Prince Edward Island potatoes, the island’s farmers, industry leaders and RCMP race to catch the culprits before they strike again.
6	"Shropshire Sheep Scandal"	Maya Bastian	November 3, 2023
Ontario shepherd Montana Jones fights to protect her flock of rare Shropshire sheep from a government agency that alleges the animals are diseased– until the sheep mysteriously vanish in the night.

== Reception ==
The show has been praised for looking at the crimes with intelligence and respect. At the end of 2018, Farm Crime was named as one of the “25 most binge-worthy TV shows of 2018” by NOW Magazine. It also received positive reviews from Canadian entertainment websites, and was cited for its unique spin on the true crime genre.

=== Awards and nominations ===
The first season of Farm Crime was nominated for the Best Web Program or Series in Non-Fiction under the Digital Media category at the 2019 Canadian Screen Awards. The first season was also nominated for Best Web Non-Fiction Series at the Banff World Media Festival in the same year. At the T.O. Webfest in 2019, the series was nominated for the IWCC Canadian Spotlight and Best Cinematography awards, and won the Best Canadian Series and Best Documentary Series awards.

The second season of Farm Crime won the Best Web Program or Series, Non-Fiction award in the 2022 Canadian Screen Awards, and director and writer Kathleen Jayme was nominated for the Best Writing, Web Program or Series award for Invasion of the Murder Hornets. In the 2022 T.O. Webfest, it was nominated for best documentary series, best editing and best cinematography, and won the award for best original score.

The third season of Farm Crime was nominated for the Best Web Program or Series, Non-Fiction award in the 2024 Canadian Screen Awards, and director and writer Maya Annik Bedward was nominated for the Best Direction, Web Program or Series award for Pigeon Ponzi. In the 2024 T.O. Webfest, season three was nominated for best English Canadian series and won the genre award for best documentary series.
