= Lawrence Barry =

Canadian actor

Lawrence Barry is a Canadian actor. He is most noted for his performance in the 2016 film Riverhead, for which he received a Canadian Screen Award nomination for Best Actor at the 5th Canadian Screen Awards.

He has also appeared in the films Rare Birds, Away from Everywhere, Maudie, The Grand Seduction, Black Conflux, Body and Bones, Sweetland and Skeet, and the television series Republic of Doyle, Frontier and Son of a Critch.
