= A Mountain Is a Mouth =

Studio album by Bruce Peninsula
- Released: February 3, 2009
- Genre: Folk-rock
- Length: 41:11
- Label: Outside
- Producers: Leon Taheny and Bruce Peninsula

Professional ratings
Review scores
Source	Rating
Eye Weekly	3.0/5 stars
Toro	4.0/5 stars

A Mountain Is a Mouth is the full-length debut of Toronto folk-rock band Bruce Peninsula. It was recorded in various locations throughout the city, including the University of Toronto. It was long-listed for the 2009 Polaris Music Prize.

== Track listing ==
1. "Inside/Outside" – 5:14
2. "Steamroller" – 4:40
3. "2nd 4th World War" – 5:04
4. "Satisfied" – 1:08
5. "Shutters" – 5:32
6. "Weave Myself a Dress" – 4:51
7. "Crabapples" – 2:37
8. "Shanty Song" – 5:30
9. "Drinking All Day" – 4:14
10. "Northbound/Southbound" – 2:28
