= Vagrant (2020 film) =

2020 Canadian film

- Directed by: Caleb Ryan
- Written by: Caleb Ryan
- Produced by: Caleb Ryan
- Starring: Luke Oparah
- Cinematography: Darion Trotman
- Edited by: Lela Sanders
- Production company: Dos Gatos Negros Films
- Distributed by: Mongrel Media
- Release date: September 30, 2020 (CIFF)
- Running time: 83 minutes
- Country: Canada
- Language: English

Vagrant is a Canadian drama film, directed by Caleb Ryan and released in 2020. Shot in Calgary, Alberta, the film stars Luke Oparah as Frank, a Black Canadian homeless man who discovers a new motivation to clean up and rebuild his life when he finds and adopts an abandoned puppy.

The cast also includes Ana Isabella Piñero, Joseph C. Ryan, Kevin Kaye, Anthony Goring, Ray Val, Spencer Streichert, Gary Layton, Munraj Sahota, Darion Trotman, Nancy Evans, Amarjot Nijjar, Kathy Roe, Ashu Kito, Adrien Wallace and Hazel Anderson in supporting roles.

The film premiered at the 2020 Calgary International Film Festival.

== Awards ==
The film was named to the initial longlist for the 2020 DGC Discovery Award, and Ryan was nominated for the Kevin Tierney Emerging Producer Award at the 2021 Indiescreen awards.
