= Riverhead (film) =

- Directed by: Justin Oakey
- Written by: Justin Oakey
- Produced by: Justin Oakey; Brad Gover
- Starring: Lawrence Barry; Evan Mercer; Stephen Oates; Des Walsh; Stephen Lush
- Cinematography: Ian Vatcher
- Edited by: Justin Oakey
- Music by: Ulver
- Release date: September 16, 2016 (AFF)
- Running time: 97 minutes
- Country: Canada
- Language: English

Riverhead is a 2016 Canadian drama film directed by Justin Oakey. Set in a small town in Newfoundland and Labrador, the film stars Lawrence Barry as Patrick Whelan, a community patriarch drawn into a blood feud when Michael (Stephen Oates) and Robert (Evan Mercer) Windsor, the sons of a former enemy of Patrick's, return to town.

The film premiered on September 16, 2016 at the Atlantic Film Festival.

The original score was composed by the Norwegian experimental electronic group Ulver.

The film received two Canadian Screen Award nominations at the 5th Canadian Screen Awards in 2017, for Best Actor (Barry) and Best Supporting Actor (Mercer).
