= Black Zombie =

2026 Canadian documentary film by Maya Annik Bedward

- Release poster
- Directed by: Maya Annik Bedward
- Written by: Maya Annik Bedward
- Produced by: Maya Annik Bedward; Kate MacCallum Fraser; Hannah Donegan
- Starring: Yves-Grégory Francois; Erol Josué; Mambo Labelle Déesse; Anderson Mojica
- Cinematography: Duraid Munajim; Ricardo Diaz
- Edited by: Avrïl Jacobson; Jay Cheel; Peter Denes; Lawrence Jackman
- Music by: David Arcus
- Production companies: Third Culture Media; Hungry Eyes Media
- Distributed by: Raven Banner Releasing
- Release date: March 13, 2026 (SXSW)
- Running time: 90 minutes
- Country: Canada
- Languages: English; French; Kreyol
- Box office: $31,357

Black Zombie is a 2026 Canadian documentary film written and directed by Maya Annik Bedward. The film profiles the roots of zombie mythology in Haitian Vodou, exploring the ways in which its evolution from a folkloric metaphor for slavery into a trope of horror and monster fiction have distorted and disrupted Black history.

The film premiered on March 13, 2026, at the South by Southwest Film & TV Festival, and had its Canadian premiere on April 24 at the Hot Docs Canadian International Documentary Festival.

In June 2026, Kino Lorber acquired U.S. distribution rights to the film.

== Reception ==
=== Critical response ===
On the review aggregator website Rotten Tomatoes, 100% of 47 critics' reviews are positive, with an average rating of 8.2/10. The website's consensus reads: "Black Zombie is a thought-provoking and restorative reexamination of the zombie myth that confronts its roots in racial exploitation while deepening — and even renewing — appreciation of the genre." Metacritic, which uses a weighted average, assigned the film a score of 84 out of 100, based on eight critics, indicating "universal acclaim".

Brian Tallerico of RogerEbert.com wrote, "Bedward wisely avoids turning Black Zombie into a class lecture. She conducts what were clearly buoyant, informed interviews not just with experts on it but with those influenced by the culture, like, believe it or not, Slash."

Jessi Cape of The Austin Chronicle wrote, "Black Zombie demands you reconsider both the horrors humans are capable of and the untold beauty of the living and the dead. It's the rare documentary you want everyone you know to watch."

=== Accolades ===
At the 30th Fantasia International Film Festival, Bedward won the Northern Excellence Award for Canadian Filmmaking. The film was shortlisted for the Jean-Marc Vallée DGC Discovery Award at the Directors Guild of Canada awards in 2026.
