= Hangashore =

2025 Canadian thriller film

- Directed by: Justin Oakey
- Written by: Justin Oakey
- Produced by: G. Patrick Condon; Justin Oakey; Tania Sarra
- Starring: Hera Hilmar; James Frecheville; Stephen Oates
- Cinematography: James Klopko
- Edited by: Justin Oakey
- Music by: Andrew Nolan
- Production company: Black River Pictures
- Release date: September 12, 2025 (AIFF)
- Running time: 87 minutes
- Country: Canada
- Languages: English; Icelandic

Hangashore is a Canadian thriller film, directed by Justin Oakey and released in 2025. The film stars Hera Hilmar as Vera, an Icelandic artist haunted by recurring nightmares about her missing father; she travels to Newfoundland in search of him, and becomes drawn into a relationship with Jack (James Frecheville), a local seal hunter.

== Production ==
The film was announced as receiving funding from Telefilm Canada in 2023, and entered production in spring 2024.

Oakey described the film as stripping away the naturalism of his prior films to build an "ominous, almost feverish atmosphere".

== Release ==
The film premiered at the 2025 Atlantic International Film Festival, and was the official selection of Cinéfest Sudbury International Film Festival, Windsor International Film Festival, Charlottetown Film Festival, Available Light Film Festival, Calgary Underground Film Festival, and the Canadian Film Fest, where it won the DGC Award for Best Director and a Special Jury Prize for Best Cinematography.

== Critical reception ==
ScreenAnarchy lauded the film as "a foreboding old-world ghost story lost in fog and dreams." Rue Morgue Magazine praised it as "an icy tale of retribution" and "a desolate yet beautiful portrait of Canada's east coast."
