= Naziha Arebi =

Film director and screenwriter

Naziha Arebi (born 1984) is a Libyan-British film director, producer, writer and artist. Her films have been shown at international film festivals, and her documentary film Freedom Fields was nominated for a BAFTA award.

== Biography ==
Arebi was born in 1984 to an English mother and Libyan father and was raised in Hastings, East Sussex. She studied film at Central Saint Martins in London.

Arebi moved to Tripoli, Libya during the 2011 uprising to explore her dual heritage and her fathers homeland. In 2012, she co-founded HuNa Productions, a Tripoli-based film collective.

Arebi directed and produced the film Freedom Fields, which premiered at the 2018 Toronto International Film Festival (TIFF). The film was subsequently shown at over 70 other international film festivals. It follows three women, their Libyan football team and the challenges they faced after the country descends into the 2011 civil war and was filmed over five years.

Her writings and photography have also been published in multiple magazines and newspapers. She has shot documentaries supported by news outlets Al Jazeera and The Guardian.

Arebi works as a programme consultant for Sheffield DocFest. She also works with organizations such as UN Women and BBC Media Action.

== Selected filmography ==
- Freedom Fields (2018)
- After A Revolution (2021)
