= Bruce Peninsula (band) =

Canadian indie rock band

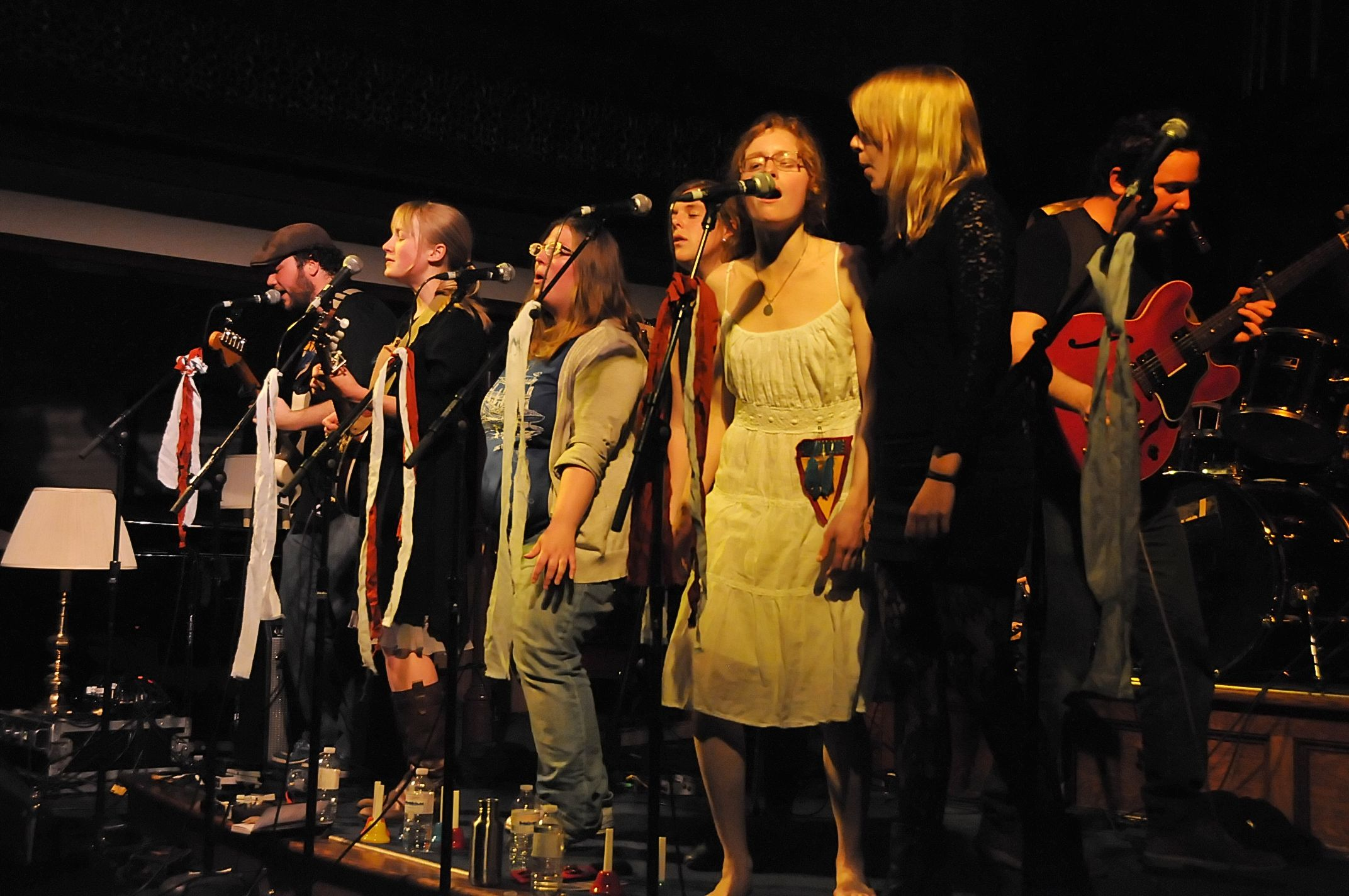
- Bruce Peninsula, April 2010

Background information
- Origin: Ontario, Canada
- Genres: Indie rock
- Years active: 2006–present
- Labels: Bruce Trail, Outside Music, Hand Drawn Dracula
- Members: Matt Cully; Misha Bower; Neil Haverty; Andrew Barker; Steve McKay
- Website: brucepeninsula.bandcamp.com/music

Bruce Peninsula is a Canadian indie rock band, whose style has been described as "a near indescribable and rousing potpourri of prog, gospel, folk, rock, pop and country." The band consists of core members Matt Cully on vocals and guitar, Misha Bower on vocals, Neil Haverty on vocals, guitar and metallophone, Andrew Barker on bass guitar and lap steel, and Steve McKay on drums.

Bruce Peninsula also regularly features a large choir section, made up of Tamara Lindeman (The Weather Station), Ivy Mairi, Daniella Gesundheit (Snowblink) and Kari Peddle. The choir has previously included Katie Stelmanis (Austra), Casey Mecija (Ohbijou), Isla Craig, Amy Learmonth (the Youngest), Taylor Kirk (Timber Timbre), and Christienne Chesney.

== History ==
Bruce Peninsula was formed in 2006. The band's debut album, A Mountain Is a Mouth, was released in February 2009 on their own Bruce Trail Records. The album was named to the preliminary longlist for the 2009 Polaris Music Prize on June 15.

Their second album, the gospel-oriented Open Flames, was released in October 2011 on Hand Drawn Dracula.

In 2012, the band released a 14-minute song cycle entitled Of Songs. The band can also be heard on the soundtrack of the 2016 film Sleeping Giant, and in an Ontario Tourism television advertisement. Haverty has also composed music for film and television, including the films Hazy Little Thing and Wildhood.

The band's third full-length album, No Earthly Sound, was released in 2020.

Haverty has also been a composer of film scores, most notably for the films Body and Bones, Wildhood and Monica's News, while Matt Cully has released music under the band name EONS.

== Discography ==
=== Albums ===
- A Mountain is a Mouth (2009)
- Open Flames (2011)
- No Earthly Sound (2020)

=== EPs ===
- Debut 7" (2008)
- Bruce Trail Fire Sale (2011)

=== Singles ===
- Of Songs (2012)

=== Compilations ===
- Friends in Bellwoods II (2009): "In Parallel"

=== Soundtracks ===
The music of Bruce Peninsula is also featured in the independent film Small Town Murder Songs.

== See also ==
- Music of Canada
- Canadian rock
- List of bands from Canada
- List of Canadian musicians
- Category:Canadian musical groups
