= Night Blooms =

- Directed by: Stephanie Joline
- Written by: Stephanie Joline
- Produced by: Jason Levangie; Marc Tetrault
- Starring: Jessica Clement; Nick Stahl
- Cinematography: Paul McCurdy
- Edited by: Amy Mielke
- Music by: Nathan Wiley
- Production companies: Shut Up & Colour Pictures
- Distributed by: LevelFilm
- Release date: September 26, 2021 (CIFF)
- Running time: 97 minutes
- Country: Canada
- Language: English

Night Blooms is a 2021 Canadian drama film, written and directed by Stephanie Joline. The film stars Jessica Clement as Carly, a teenage girl from a dysfunctional family in Nova Scotia who initiates an affair with her best friend's father Wayne (Nick Stahl).

The cast also includes Jennie Raymond, Calem MacDonald, Bob Mann, David Rossetti, Oliver Boyle, Thom Payne, Samuel Davison, Micha Cromwell, Samantha Wilson, Alexandra McDonald, Tyrell Casimir and Marcus Simmonds.

Production on the film started in 2019 in Dartmouth, Nova Scotia.

The film was screened as part of the Industry Selects film market at the 2021 Toronto International Film Festival, and had its public premiere at the 2021 Calgary International Film Festival. It went into commercial release in April 2022.

The film was a nominee for the 2021 DGC Discovery Award. It received six nominations for the Screen Nova Scotia awards in 2022, including Best Feature Film, WIFT Best Nova Scotia Director and ACTRA Award Outstanding Performance nominations for Calem MacDonald, Alexandra McDonald, Jennie Raymond and Samantha Wilson.
