= Seguridad =

2024 documentary film

- Directed by: Tamara Segura
- Written by: Tamara Segura
- Produced by: Annette Clarke; Rohan Fernando
- Cinematography: Deymi D'Atri
- Edited by: Andrea Henriquez; Tamara Segura
- Music by: Andrew Sisk
- Production company: National Film Board of Canada
- Release date: April 6, 2024 (Miami)
- Running time: 76 minutes
- Country: Canada
- Languages: English; Spanish

Seguridad is a Canadian documentary film, directed by Tamara Segura and released in 2024. The film is a personal exploration of the life of her father Jorge, examining her discovery of a family secret that provided her with profound new insight into how he became an alcoholic whose propensity toward violent outbursts when drinking had profoundly negative and painful effects on her childhood, ultimately forcing her to estrange herself from him and move to Canada from their native Cuba.

The film premiered on April 6, 2024, at the Miami International Film Festival, and had its Canadian premiere on April 29 at the Hot Docs Canadian International Documentary Festival.

== Awards ==
It was longlisted for the 2024 Jean-Marc Vallée DGC Discovery Award.

At the 2024 Atlantic International Film Festival, the film won the award for Best Atlantic Canadian Documentary.
