= Monica's News =

2024 film by Pamela Gallant

- Theatrical release poster
- Directed by: Pamela Gallant
- Screenplay by: Pamela Gallant
- Produced by: Terry Greenlaw
- Starring: Polly Gallant-Maclean
- Cinematography: Peter Wunstorf
- Edited by: Kimberlee McTaggart; Maria Psaila
- Music by: Neil Haverty
- Production company: Picture Plant
- Release dates: September 13, 2024 (AIFF); March 7, 2026 (Canada)
- Running time: 84 minutes
- Country: Canada
- Language: English

Monica's News is a 2024 Canadian drama film written and directed by Pamela Gallant. The film stars Polly Gallant-Maclean as Casey Richards, a young girl living in smalltown Nova Scotia in the 1970s who starts to establish her own independence by taking a newspaper delivery route despite that not being a common job for girls in that era, only to see her idealism challenged when her older cousin Monica (Elisa Paszt) is murdered.

The cast also includes Kevin Kincaid, Allegra Fulton, James Gilbert, Jessica Gallant, Vox Smith, Hank White, Emma Vickers, Allister MacDonald, David Mortimer, Stacy Smith, Morgan Melnyk, Isaac Leblanc, Maria Young, Wiljo Martin, Mark A. Owen, Lesley Smith and Cooper Watson in supporting roles.

== Production and distribution ==
In advance of the film's production, Gallant won the $200,000 Women in the Director's Chair award at the 2019 Whistler Film Festival for the screenplay treatment.

The film entered production in July 2023, with shooting locations including Halifax and Ellershouse, Nova Scotia.

The film premiered at the 2024 Atlantic International Film Festival.

== Awards ==
The film was longlisted for the 2024 Jean-Marc Vallée DGC Discovery Award. At AIFF, Kimberlee McTaggart won the award for Best Atlantic Canadian Editing, and Gallant-Maclean received an honorable mention for the best acting award.
