= Sweet Angel Baby =

- Film poster
- Directed by: Melanie Oates
- Screenplay by: Melanie Oates
- Produced by: Chris Hatcher; Matt Power; Melanie Oates
- Starring: Michaela Kurimsky; Elle-Máijá Tailfeathers; Peter Mooney
- Cinematography: Christopher Mabley
- Edited by: James Vandewater
- Production companies: Chara Pictures; Dodd Motors
- Distributed by: Vortex Media
- Release date: September 9, 2024 (TIFF)
- Running time: 95 minutes
- Country: Canada
- Language: English

Sweet Angel Baby is a Canadian drama film directed by Melanie Oates, and released in 2024. The film stars Michaela Kurimsky as Eliza, a woman living in a small town in Newfoundland and Labrador whose place in the community is challenged when her secret social media persona, and her private romantic relationship with Toni (Elle-Máijá Tailfeathers) are unexpectedly exposed.

The cast also includes Peter Mooney, Rhiannon Morgan and Patricia Andrews.

The film premiered in the Centrepiece program at the 2024 Toronto International Film Festival, and was also screened as the Atlantic Gala at the 2024 Atlantic International Film Festival. It later screened in the Borsos Competition program at the 2024 Whistler Film Festival.

== Awards ==
The film was shortlisted for the 2024 Jean-Marc Vallée DGC Discovery Award. AT AIFF, Oates won the award for Best Atlantic Canadian Screenwriting.
