= The Queen of My Dreams =

2023 Canadian-Pakistani drama film

- Film poster
- Directed by: Fawzia Mirza
- Screenplay by: Fawzia Mirza
- Based on: Me, My Mom & Sharmila by Fawzia Mirza; The Queen of My Dreams by Fawzia Mirza
- Produced by: Jason Levangie; Andria Wilson Mirza; Marc Tetreault
- Starring: Amrit Kaur; Nimra Bucha; Hamza Haq; Uzma Beg
- Cinematography: Matt Irwin
- Edited by: Simone Smith
- Music by: Alysha Brilla
- Production companies: Baby Daal Productions; Shut Up & Colour Pictures
- Distributed by: Cineplex Pictures
- Release dates: September 8, 2023 (TIFF); March 22, 2024 (Canada)
- Running time: 97 minutes
- Countries: Canada; Pakistan
- Languages: English; Urdu

The Queen of My Dreams is a 2023 Pakistani Canadian comedy-drama film, written and directed by Fawzia Mirza in her feature directorial debut. The film is based on Mirza's theatrical stage play Me, My Mom & Sharmila, which in turn was based on her 2012 short film The Queen of My Dreams. The film stars Amrit Kaur as Azra, a Pakistani Canadian woman who has had a strained relationship with her parents since coming out as lesbian, who undergoes an emotional journey after the sudden unexpected death of her father Hassan (Hamza Haq).

The film had its world premiere in the Discovery program at the 2023 Toronto International Film Festival. The film later received five Canadian Screen Award nominations at the 12th Canadian Screen Awards in 2024, winning for Best Lead Performance and Best Original Song.

== Cast ==
=== Lead cast ===
- Amrit Kaur as Azra Malik
  - Ayana Manji as Young Azra
- Hamza Haq as Hassan Malik
- Nimra Bucha as Mariam Malik
  - Amrit Kaur as Young Mariam

=== Supporting cast ===
- Charlie Boyle as Sharon
- Kirstin Howell as Sturdy Woman
- Josh MacDonald as Mr. Sharp
- Ali Kazmi as Zahid Malik
- Lindsay Watters as Sturdy Woman
- Sheema Kermani as Dance Instructor
- Meher Jaffri as Sadia
- Uzma Beg as Hassan's mother
- Azra Mohyeddin as Worst Auntie
- Zarqa Naz as Proper Auntie
- Sameena Nazir as Motherly Auntie
- Kya Mosey as Rachel
- Shamim Hilaly as Woman on Plane
- Emerson MacNeil as Alicia
- Thea Burton as Sturdy Woman
- Hasan Arif as Rishta
- Anwaar as Rishta
- Adnan Jaffar as Irfan Kadri
- Saad Zameer as Bootlegger
- Vicky Yi-Yin Zhuang as Jenny
- Trina Corkum as Mrs. Shah
- Carl Gosine as Dr. Shah
- Siya Ajay as Jaya Shah
- Meesum Naqvi as Gatekeeper
- Areeba Suleman as Flight Attendant
- Bakhtawar Mazhar as Rani Khala
- Danish Irshad as Baji
- Zara Usman as Rani
- Wolfgang Foster as Wayne
- Nishat Kazmi as Nani
- Mujtaba Hussain as Flower Seller
- Jahanzaib Navi as Fruit Seller
- Gul-e-Rana as Amira Kadri

== Production ==
The film was shot in 2022, under the working title Me, My Mom & Sharmila.

It was adapted from Mirza's theatrical stage play of the same name, which was itself drawn from her 2012 short film The Queen of My Dreams.

== Distribution ==
The film was screened at the Cannes Film Market in May 2023, and had its public premiere in the Discovery program at the 2023 Toronto International Film Festival.

In May 2025, Willa and Product of Culture acquired US distribution rights to the film, and set it for a June 20, 2025, release.

== Reception ==
On the review aggregator website Rotten Tomatoes, 100% of 12 critics' reviews are positive, with an average rating of 7.8/10. Metacritic, which uses a weighted average, assigned the film a score of 66 out of 100, based on 6 critics, indicating "generally favorable" reviews.

The film was named to TIFF's annual Canada's Top Ten list for 2023.

=== Awards ===
The film was shortlisted for the 2023 Jean-Marc Vallée DGC Discovery Award.

The film received five Canadian Screen Award nominations at the 12th Canadian Screen Awards in 2024, for Best Lead Performance in a Drama Film (Kaur), Best Adapted Screenplay (Mirza), Best Art Direction/Production Design (Michael Pierson), Best Original Score (Alysha Brilla) and Best Original Song (Qurram Hussain for "Ishq Ki Na Koi Bhi Hud Hai"), winning for Best Lead Performance and Best Original Song.

Mirza was co-winner, with Karen Knox for We Forgot to Break Up, of the DGC Award for Best Direction in a Feature Film.
