= Amrit Kaur (actress) =

Canadian actress, producer, and writer (born 1993)

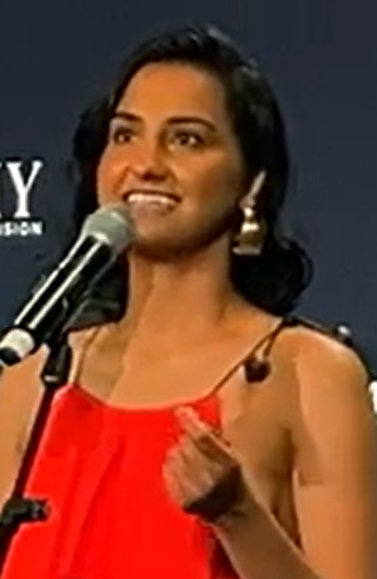
- Kaur at the 2024 Canadian Screen Awards
- Born: June 4, 1993 (age 33)
- Education: Bur Oak Secondary School; York University
- Occupations: Actress, producer, writer
- Years active: 2015–present

Amrit Kaur (born June 4, 1993) is a Canadian actress, producer, and writer, best known for her role as Bela Malhotra on the HBO Max series, The Sex Lives of College Girls. She is a company member of Gracemoon Arts Theatre, Salon, and Gallery.

== Early life and education ==
Amrit Kaur grew up in an Indian Punjabi-Sikh family in Markham, Ontario. Her parents emigrated from India to Canada before she was born.

She began acting as an extracurricular in high school, serving as the senior captain of her school's improv team. She earned her BFA in theatre from the School of the Arts, Media, Performance & Design at York University in Toronto. In her early twenties, she met acting coach Michèle Lonsdale-Smith, whom she credits to have been instrumental in her artistic growth and career.

== Career ==
Amrit Kaur is best known for her breakout role of Bela Malhotra in Mindy Kaling's Sex Lives of College Girls. She has acted in various television shows, including Kim's Convenience and Star Trek: Short Treks. Kaur also played Pasha in the 2017 Canadian film Brown Girl Begins and had appeared as Jessie in the 2018 romantic comedy film Little Italy.

Kaur was cast as freshman Bela Malhotra on Mindy Kaling's television series, The Sex Lives of College Girls, which premiered on HBO Max in November 2021 and was renewed for a second season the following month. She auditioned for the role despite not having the required O-1 Visa, which allows "individuals with extraordinary ability or achievement" to work in the United States for up to three years. Because the producers discovered that she didn't have the visa, they canceled her callback but later gave her another chance. She then advanced to the final round of auditions but her O-1 Visa application was rejected. However, all of the producers on the show – including Kaling – wrote letters urging the U.S. government to accept her visa, which was later approved.

She won the Canadian Screen Award for Best Lead Performance in a Drama Film at the 12th Canadian Screen Awards in 2024 for The Queen of My Dreams. In her viral acceptance speech, she criticized those “telling us artists not to speak up in fear of losing jobs”, before calling for a “ceasefire now, free Palestine”. Amrit Kaur is also an activist who articulates her mandate as "to do art that will teach girls, particularly South Asian girls, that they don’t have to live a life of oppression.” Amrit has candidly shared her struggles with insecurity during her formative years and how these feelings motivated her to pursue acting. She aimed to become a role model for young girls who share similar experiences.

Amrit Kaur is a founding member and Board Chair of Gracemoon Arts Company & Theater. In 2024, members of the Gracemoon Arts Theater described it as “a new space is dedicated to giving back to the community and producing work that inspires conversations about humanitarian issues.”.

== Filmography ==
=== Film ===
Year	Title	Role	Notes
2017	Brown Girl Begins	Pasha	
2018	Little Italy	Jessie	
2023	The Queen of My Dreams	Azra and Young Mariam	Dual role
2024	Young Werther	Melanie	
2024	Stealing Vows	Gina	
TBA	Just Picture It	TBA	Filming

=== Television ===
Year	Title	Role	Notes
2015–2018	Anarkali	Roop	20 episodes
2016	American Gothic	Staffer	1 episode
2017	Odd Squad	Annette	1 episode
2017	Kim's Convenience	Lauren	1 episode
2019	The Bold Type	Ginny	1 episode
2019	Star Trek: Short Treks	Cadet Thira Sidhu	1 episode
2019	Hudson & Rex	Gabby Mitchell	2 episodes
2020	Nurses	Dawn	1 episode
2020	The D Cut	Viva	6 episodes
2021–2025	The Sex Lives of College Girls	Bela Malhotra	Lead role (30 episodes)

== Awards ==
Association	Year	Category	Work	Result	Ref.
Iris Prize Festival	2023	Best Actress	The Queen of My Dreams	Won	
Canadian Screen Awards	2024	Best Lead Performance in a Drama Film	The Queen of My Dreams	Won	

== See also ==
- South Asian Canadians in the Greater Toronto Area
