= Reset (2022 film) =

2022 Canadian documentary film

- Directed by: Min Bae
- Produced by: Min Bae
- Cinematography: Min Bae
- Edited by: Min Bae
- Production company: Cactus Film
- Distributed by: Freestyle Digital Media
- Release date: August 2022 (RIFFA)
- Running time: 105 minutes
- Countries: Canada; South Korea
- Language: Korean

Reset is a Canadian-South Korean documentary film, directed by Min Bae and released in 2022. The film centres on the 2014 sinking of MV Sewol, exploring the questions about the tragedy and its aftermath that were still unanswered almost a decade later.

The film had its world premiere at the 2022 Regina International Film Festival, and was subsequently screened at the Windsor International Film Festival.

The film was longlisted for the 2022 Jean-Marc Vallée DGC Discovery Award.
