= Diamantino (film) =

2018 film by Gabriel Abrantes and Daniel Schmidt

- Portuguese theatrical release poster
- Directed by: Gabriel Abrantes; Daniel Schmidt
- Written by: Gabriel Abrantes; Daniel Schmidt
- Produced by: Maria João Mayer; Justin Taurand; Daniel van Hoogstraten
- Starring: Carloto Cotta; Cleo Tavares; Anabela Moreira; Margarida Moreira; Carla Maciel; Chico Chapas; Hugo Santos Silva; Joana Barrios; Filipe Vargas; Maria Leite; Manuela Moura Guedes; Djucu Dabó
- Cinematography: Charles Ackley Anderson
- Edited by: Raphaëlle Martin-Holger; Gabriel Abrantes; Daniel Schmidt
- Music by: Ulysse Klotz; Adriana Holtz
- Production companies: Maria & Mayer; Les Films du Bélier; Syndrome Films
- Distributed by: NOS Audiovisuais (Portugal); UFO Distribution (France); Vitrine Filmes (Brazil)
- Release dates: 11 May 2018 (Cannes); 28 November 2018 (France); 20 December 2018 (Brazil); 4 April 2019 (Portugal)
- Running time: 96 minutes
- Countries: Portugal; France; Brazil
- Language: Portuguese
- Box office: $242,892

Diamantino is a 2018 science fantasy comedy-drama film written and directed by Gabriel Abrantes and Daniel Schmidt. The film stars Carloto Cotta as premier football star player Diamantino, who loses his special touch and ends his career in disgrace. Searching for a new purpose, the international icon sets out on a delirious odyssey where he confronts neo-fascism, the refugee crisis, genetic modification and the hunt for the source of genius.

A co-production between Portugal, France, and Brazil, the film had its world premiere in the Critics' Week section of the 2018 Cannes Film Festival, where it won the Grand Prize. It was released in cinemas in France on 28 November 2018, in Brazil on 20 December 2018, and in Portugal on 4 April 2019.

== Plot ==
Diamantino is a Portuguese footballer whose appearance and persona evoke those of Cristiano Ronaldo. Raised by a widowed father, he is exploited by his twin older sister who seeks to control his fortune. Although regarded as a footballing genius, Diamantino is portrayed a naive and lacking awareness outside the sport, his most notable trait being a profound capacity for empathy.

While sailing his yacht, Diamantino rescues a boat of refugees , an experience that leaves him deeply affected by their suffering. this emotional turmoil distracts him during the final of the FIFA World Cupm causing him to miss the decisive shot. Around the same time, his father dies of a stroke following prolong harassment by his daughters.

After being blamed for losing the World Cup for Portugal, Diamantino's career is over and he becomes a national joke. While wallowing in sorrow over his career and his father's death, Diamantino sees an ad for child refugees who need a family. He goes on a TV interview to express his desire to adopt a refugee. Two lesbian Secret Service agents who have been investigating Diamantino for money laundering see the interview and decide to capitalize on the opportunity. One of the agents, named Aisha, disguises herself as a boy named Rahim and poses as Diamantino's adopted refugee. Meanwhile, his sisters volunteer their brother to the ministry of propaganda whose plan is to clone Diamantino and create an entire soccer team of genius players. Diamantino, being a gullible and obedient little brother, doesn't suspect anything and goes to his appointments every day with genetic specialist Dr. Lamborghini, thinking that they are trying to get his mojo back. Diamantino's cloning treatment involves a large amount of hormones and he begins to grow boobs.

Agent Aisha's undercover investigation reveals that Diamantino is innocent and it is his sisters who are stealing from him and laundering the money. During Aisha's investigation, she and Diamantino begin to get close and her lesbian partner accuses Aisha of being too emotionally invested in the case. Diamantino's sisters see security camera footage of their fight and realize who Aisha is and what she's doing. The sisters attempt to kill Aisha, but are interrupted when they see Diamantino arriving home. Aisha escapes and goes to Diamantino, who takes her to the safety of his yacht. On the yacht, Aisha and Diamantino have a romantic moment and she reveals to him that she is a woman. The next morning, Diamantino's sisters text him the video of Aisha and her girlfriend arguing and trick him into believing it was them who stole the money from him. Diamantino then goes to meet with his sisters who then kidnap him and bring him to the cloning facility. The last phase of the cloning is to transfer his genius to the clones, and it would kill Diamantino. However, the last phase fails because Diamantino is too dumb and doesn't have enough active brainpower to transfer. Meanwhile, Aisha breaks into the facility to rescue Diamantino, but runs into the twins, who try to kill her. Aisha ends up killing both the twins and tries to rescue Diamantino, who realizes that her feelings for him were real. Just as Aisha is about to get Diamantino to safety, she is shot by the director of the ministry of propaganda, who then proceeds to try and drown her. Diamantino musters all of his strength and kills the director, saving Aisha. Diamantino realizes that he got his mojo back, but decides to give up soccer, and he and Aisha live a happy life together.

== Cast ==
- Carloto Cotta as Diamantino Matamouros
- Cleo Tavares as Aisha Brito
- Anabela Moreira as Sonia Matamouros
- Margarida Moreira as Natasha Matamouros
- Carla Maciel as Dr. Lamborghini
- Chico Chapas as Chico Matamouros
- Hugo Santos Silva as Mouro
- Joana Barrios as Minister Ferro
- Filipe Vargas as Helena Guerra
- Maria Leite as Lucia
- Manuela Moura Guedes as Gisele
- Leandro Vieira as goalkeeper

== Production ==
Diamantino is a co-production of Portugal's Maria & Mayer, France's Les Films du Bélier, and Brazil's Syndrome Films. The film was shot on Kodak 16 mm film for five weeks in Portugal, with locations including Lisbon, the Palace of Correio-Mor in Loures, the Algarve, and Smiling Studios in Lisbon.

== Release ==
Diamantino had its world premiere in the Critics' Week section of the 2018 Cannes Film Festival. The film was released theatrically in France on 28 November 2018 by UFO Distribution, in Brazil on 20 December 2018 by Vitrine Filmes, and in Portugal on 4 April 2019 by NOS Audiovisuais. In the United States, it was released on 24 May 2019 by Kino Lorber.

== Reception ==
=== Box office ===
Diamantino grossed $242,892 worldwide, including $88,310 in France, $70,088 in the United States, $65,087 in Portugal, $10,021 in the United Kingdom, and $9,386 in Italy.

=== Critical response ===
On the review aggregator website Rotten Tomatoes, the film holds an approval rating of 87% based on 71 reviews, with an average rating of 7.3/10. The website's critics consensus reads: "Diamantino casts a singularly surreal eye on an ambitious array of subjects, emerging with a cinematic experience as inscrutable as it is unforgettable." Metacritic, which uses a weighted average, assigned the film a score of 73 out of 100, based on 13 critics, indicating "generally favorable" reviews.

In a review for the Los Angeles Times, Justin Chang described the film as "the funniest gender-bending, human-cloning refugee-crisis soccer comedy I've ever seen, and also the most thoughtful." He added that the film's "madcap delirium can't hide its insistent politics, its disdain for sham populism and its compassion for the disenfranchised. Diamantino is no less committed to these ideas than it is to its own uneven, unforgettable lunacy."

Glenn Kenny of The New York Times named Diamantino a "Critic's Pick", writing that the film "feels like an early Adam Sandler comedy remixed by Pier Paolo Pasolini." Josh Cabrita of Cinemascope praised Gabriel Abrantes and Daniel Schmidt's directing abilities, saying: "Abrantes and Schmidt broach issues such as the refugee crisis, neo-fascism, and surveillance technology with a camp concoction that effortlessly flattens this tapestry of topicalities."

Cath Clarke of The Guardian gave Diamantino three out of five stars, saying: "The film is fun, but, for all its inventiveness, it's a bit tame, with its nice-but-dim hero. But Diamantino is never dull." Peter Sobczynski of RogerEbert.com gave the film three out of four stars, writing that "the sheer weirdness of the whole enterprise has a charm to it and it certainly is never boring. Bewildering, maybe, but never boring." Sobczynski went on to write: "The stuff involving the mad scientist and the unexpected results of her experiments on Diamantino are absurd enough but enter the proceedings in such an arbitrary manner that it fails to land the impact that it might have had with a more focused screenplay." Allan Hunter of Screen Daily concluded, "The film has a certain visual allure in its gaudy colours and low-budget special-effects. Yet you also long for them to put all those energies into a more focused, far funnier project."

=== Accolades ===
Award	Year	Category	Recipient(s)	Result	Ref.
Cannes Film Festival	2018	Critics' Week Grand Prize	Gabriel Abrantes and Daniel Schmidt	Won	
Cannes Film Festival	2018	Palm Dog Award – Jury Prize	Gabriel Abrantes and Daniel Schmidt	Won	
Cannes Film Festival	2018	Queer Palm	Gabriel Abrantes and Daniel Schmidt	Nominated	
Chéries-Chéris	2018	Grand Prize Chéries-Chéris	Gabriel Abrantes and Daniel Schmidt	Nominated	
CPH PIX	2018	Politiken's Audience Award	Gabriel Abrantes and Daniel Schmidt	Nominated	
European Film Awards	2018	Best Comedy	Gabriel Abrantes and Daniel Schmidt	Nominated	
Miami Film Festival	2019	Jordan Ressler First Feature Award	Gabriel Abrantes and Daniel Schmidt	Nominated	
Munich Film Festival	2018	Best Film by an Emerging Director	Gabriel Abrantes and Daniel Schmidt	Nominated	
Neuchâtel International Fantastic Film Festival	2018	Best Feature Film	Gabriel Abrantes and Daniel Schmidt	Nominated	
Palm Springs International Film Festival	2019	Cine Latino Award	Gabriel Abrantes and Daniel Schmidt	Nominated	
Philadelphia Film Festival	2018	Special Jury Award – Narrative Feature	Gabriel Abrantes and Daniel Schmidt	Won	
Philadelphia Film Festival	2018	Jury Award – Best Narrative Feature	Gabriel Abrantes and Daniel Schmidt	Nominated	
Portland International Film Festival	2019	Jury Prize – Best of Ways of Seeing	Gabriel Abrantes and Daniel Schmidt	Won	
Sarasota Film Festival	2018	Best Film	Gabriel Abrantes and Daniel Schmidt	Nominated	
Stockholm Film Festival	2018	Bronze Horse – Best Film	Gabriel Abrantes and Daniel Schmidt	Nominated	
Strasbourg European Fantastic Film Festival	2018	Best International Feature Film	Gabriel Abrantes and Daniel Schmidt	Nominated	

== See also ==
- List of association football films
