= Evan Mercer =

Canadian actor (born 1951)

- Born: Shearstown, Newfoundland and Labrador, Canada
- Education: National Theatre School of Canada
- Occupation: Actor
- Years active: 2012–present

Evan Mercer is a Canadian actor. He is most noted for his performance in the 2016 film Riverhead, for which he garnered a Canadian Screen Award nomination for Best Supporting Actor at the 5th Canadian Screen Awards.

Originally from the community of Shearstown in Bay Roberts, Newfoundland and Labrador, Mercer has acted primarily on stage. He has also been a guest actor on the television series Republic of Doyle. He graduated from the National Theatre School of Canada in 2023.

== Filmography ==
=== Film ===
Year	Title	Role	Notes
2013	Geek Assassin		
2014	Danny		
2016	Riverhead	Robert Winsor	Nominated – Canadian Screen Award for Best Supporting Actor
2019	Black Conflux	Murray	
2019	Body and Bones	Nick	

=== Television ===
Year	Title	Role	Notes
2012	Republic of Doyle	Baxter	1 episode: "Live Wire"
2018	Frontier	Mercer	3 episodes: "The Low Road", "House of Lord" and "The Sins of the Father"
2018-2019	Little Dog	Spam	9 episodes
2022	Son of a Critch	Felon #1	1 episode: "Lordy, Lordy, Look Who's Dead"
