= Justin Oakey =

Canadian film director

Justin Oakey is a Canadian film director.

== Early life ==
Oakey was born in Newfoundland and Labrador.

== Career ==
Oakey's debut feature film Riverhead was released in 2016.

He began his career as an editor before beginning to direct short films and music videos. His most noted short film, Flankers, was released in 2014, and was screened at various film festivals, including winning the award for best short film at the National Screen Institute's NSI Short Film Festival in 2016.

Following Flankers he entered production on Riverhead, which premiered at the Atlantic International Film Festival in 2016. His second feature film A Fire in the Cold Season, followed in 2019.

His third narrative feature film, Hangashore, premiered at the 2025 Atlantic International Film Festival. It has won a number of awards, including the DGC Award for Best Director and a Special Jury Prize for Best Cinematography at the Canadian Film Festival.

He has also continued to work as an editor, both on his own films and on work by other directors. His most noted credits as an editor is on the 2025 horror film Dolly, and the 2023 fantasy film The King Tide, for which he won the award for Best Atlantic Editor at the 2023 Atlantic International Film Festival, and the award for Best Editing in a Feature Film at the 2024 Canadian Cinema Editors awards.

== Filmography ==
=== Director ===
Year	Title	Type	Ref.
2013	The World Is Burning	Short	
2014	Flankers	Short	
2016	Riverhead	Feature	
2019	A Fire in the Cold Season	Feature	
2023	The Dogs of Petty Harbour	Documentary	
2025	Hangashore	Feature	

=== Editor ===
Year	Title	Director	Type	Ref.
2008	V.C.R.		Student Short	
2010	Ludibrium	Jonathan Balazs	Student Short	
2013	Mitten	Amanda Row	Short	
2016	Riverhead	Justin Oakey	Feature	
2018	Incredible Violence	G. Patrick Condon	Feature	
2019	A Fire in the Cold Season	Justin Oakey	Feature	
2019	Melody	Anna Wheeler	Short	
2020	Under The Weather	William D. MacGillivray	Feature	
2021	A Small Fortune	Adam Perry	Feature	
2023	The Dogs of Petty Harbour	Justin Oakey	Documentary	
2023	Blood for Dust	Rod Blackhurst	Feature	
2023	The King Tide	Christian Sparkes	Feature	
2024	Pearls	Mike Simms	Short	
2025	Oliver	Andrew Strickland	Short	
2025	Hangashore	Justin Oakey	Feature	
2025	Dolly	Rod Blackhurst	Feature	
2026	The Outer Threat	William Woods	Feature	
2026	Purgatory	Lindsay Lanzillotta	Feature	
