= Thyrone Tommy =

Canadian film director

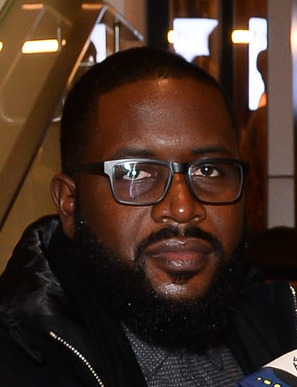
- Tommy at the 2017 Cineplex Entertainment Film Program Showcase
- Occupations: Director, writer
- Years active: 2016–present
- Works: Learn to Swim

Thyrone Tommy is a Canadian film director and screenwriter. After writing and directing the short film Mariner (2016), Tommy received acclaim for his work on the feature film Learn to Swim (2021), both of which premiered at the Toronto International Film Festival.

In 2023, he received a Canadian Screen Award nomination for directing an episode of the web series Revenge of the Black Best Friend.

== Career ==
Tommy first attracted acclaim for his short film Mariner, which was named to the Toronto International Film Festival's annual year-end Canada's Top Ten list of the year's best Canadian short films in 2016, and was the winner of the Lindalee Tracey Award in 2017.

Tommy is an alumnus of the Canadian Film Centre's film program, graduating in 2017.

Tommy's debut feature film, Learn to Swim, premiered at the 2021 Toronto International Film Festival. The film received positive reviews from critics, was a nominee for the DGC Discovery Award at the 2021 Directors Guild of Canada awards, and was named to TIFF's annual year-end Canada's Top Ten list for 2021. In 2022, the film was acquired for release on Netflix by Ava Duvernary's distribution company ARRAY.

Tommy's short film, Draft Day, was also screened at TIFF as part of NBA Films for Fans, a special event program of five Canadian short films about basketball.

Tommy received a Canadian Screen Award nomination for Best Direction in a Web Program or Series at the 11th Canadian Screen Awards in 2023 for "The One Who Dies First", an episode of the comedy web series Revenge of the Black Best Friend.

In 2024 he was named as the recipient of the Company 3 TFCA Luminary Award's "pay it forward" grant, selected by representatives of the estate of film director Charles Officer.
