= Firecrackers (film) =

- Film poster
- Directed by: Jasmin Mozaffari
- Written by: Jasmin Mozaffari
- Produced by: Caitlin Grabham; Kristy Neville
- Starring: Michaela Kurimsky; Karena Evans
- Cinematography: Catherine Lutes
- Edited by: Simone Smith
- Music by: Casey Manierka-Quaile
- Production companies: Prowler Film; Wildling Pictures; Alcina Pictures
- Distributed by: levelFILM (Canada); Good Deed Entertainment (USA)
- Release date: September 8, 2018 (TIFF)
- Running time: 93 min
- Country: Canada
- Language: English

Firecrackers is a 2018 Canadian drama film written and directed by Jasmin Mozaffari. An expansion of Mozaffari's 2013 short film of the same name, the film stars Michaela Kurimsky and Karena Evans as two teenage girls trying to escape their small town.

The film has its world premiere on September 8, 2018 at the 2018 Toronto International Film Festival. It was released theatrically on March 29, 2019 in Canada and on July 12, 2019 in the United States.

== Plot ==
Lou and Chantal are best friends whose plan to leave their isolated small town to move to the city are threatened when Chantal is assaulted by her possessive ex-boyfriend. The young women take revenge and the consequences threaten their chances of ever leaving. The more Lou fights to save her friendship and hold onto her dreams, the more she spins out of control.

== Cast ==
- Michaela Kurimsky as Lou
- Karena Evans as Chantal
- Callum Thompson as Jesse
- David Kingston as Johnny
- Tamara LeClair as Leanne
- Scott Cleland as Josh
- Dylan Mask as Kyle
- Gabe Meacher as Eric
- Robert Cormier as Shane
- Tarick Glancy as Travis

== Release ==
=== Critical reception ===
On the review aggregation website Rotten Tomatoes, the film holds an approval rating of 96%, based on 24 reviews, and an average rating of 8.1/10. On Metacritic, the film has a weighted average score of 80 out of 100, based on 11 critics, indicating "generally favorable reviews".

Katie Walsh wrote in the Los Angeles Times, "Firecrackers isn’t just a confident feature debut from Mozaffari, but a daring one, the kind of fast and furious feminine filmmaking that heralds the arrival of several exciting new talents."

The film was named a New York Times Critic's Pick in 2019, and David Edelstein named it to New York's "The Movies We Loved in 2019" list.

=== Accolades ===
In December 2018, the Toronto International Film Festival named the film to its annual year-end Canada's Top Ten films.

Award	Date of ceremony	Category	Recipient(s)	Result	Ref(s)
Canadian Screen Awards	March 31, 2019	Best Director	Jasmin Mozaffari	Won	
Canadian Screen Awards	March 31, 2019	Best Costume Design	Mara Zigler	Nominated	
Canadian Screen Awards	March 31, 2019	Best Editing	Simone Smith	Won	
Canadian Screen Awards	March 31, 2019	Best First Feature	Jasmin Mozaffari	Nominated	
Directors Guild of Canada	26 October 2019	Outstanding Directorial Achievement In Feature Film	Jasmin Mozaffari	Nominated	
Directors Guild of Canada	26 October 2019	Best Production Design – Feature Film	Thea Hollatz	Nominated	
Directors Guild of Canada	26 October 2019	Best Picture Editing – Feature Film	Simone Smith	Nominated	
Stockholm International Film Festival	November 2018	Best Film	Jasmin Mozaffari	Won	
Stockholm International Film Festival	November 2018	Best Actress	Michaela Kurimsky	Won	
Toronto Film Critics Association	January 9, 2020	Rogers Best Canadian Film Award	Jasmin Mozaffari	Runner-up	
