= Ruth Lawrence (actress) =

Canadian actress, director and producer

Ruth Lawrence is a Canadian actress, writer and filmmaker from St. John's, Newfoundland and Labrador. She is most noted for her feature directorial debut film, Little Orphans, which was the winner of the Borsos Competition at the 2020 Whistler Film Festival.

Born in St. John's and raised in St. Jacques-Coomb's Cove, she began her career as an actress, before deciding in the early 2010s to pursue filmmaking. In 2011 she won the Michelle Jackson Emerging Filmmaker Award from the St. John's International Women's Film Festival for her short film screenplay Two Square Feet, which subsequently went into production with Jeanne Beker in the lead role and premiered at the 2012 festival.

In 2012 she won the Artist of the Year award from the Newfoundland and Labrador Arts Council.

In 2018, she was one of several directors, alongside Martine Blue, Deanne Foley, Latonia Hartery, Stephanie Joline and Megan Wennberg, of Hopeless Romantic, a romantic comedy anthology film which premiered at that year's Atlantic International Film Festival before being released to streaming platforms in 2020.

Little Orphans, directed by Lawrence from a screenplay by Emily Bridger, premiered at the 2020 Atlantic International Film Festival, and was screened at the St. John's Women's Film Festival, prior to its award win at Whistler. The film was also longlisted for the Directors Guild of Canada's DGC Discovery Award.

Party Pirate, directed by Lawrence from a screenplay by her son Luke Lawrence, premiered at the St. John's Women's Film Festival in 2023 before going into commercial release in 2025.

She has also written stage plays, including Kate Crackerberry, Song Seekers: The Greenleaf & Mansfield Story, and If She Runs.
