= Young Werther =

- Film poster
- Directed by: José Lourenço
- Written by: José Lourenço
- Based on: The Sorrows of Young Werther by Johann Wolfgang von Goethe
- Produced by: Matt Code
- Starring: Douglas Booth; Alison Pill; Iris Apatow; Patrick J. Adams
- Cinematography: Nick Haight
- Edited by: Sandy Pereira
- Music by: Owen Pallett
- Production company: Wildling Pictures
- Distributed by: LevelFilm
- Release date: September 9, 2024 (TIFF)
- Running time: 101 minutes
- Country: Canada
- Language: English

Young Werther is a 2024 Canadian romantic comedy film written and directed by José Lourenço, and starring Douglas Booth, Alison Pill, Iris Apatow and Patrick J. Adams. It is Lourenço's feature directorial debut and based on the 1774 novel The Sorrows of Young Werther by Johann Wolfgang von Goethe.

The film premiered at the 2024 Toronto International Film Festival. It was later screened in a gala presentation at the 2024 Cinéfest Sudbury International Film Festival, and in the Borsos Competition program at the 2024 Whistler Film Festival.

== Premise ==
A writer falls in love with a woman, but discovers that she's already engaged.

== Cast ==
- Douglas Booth as Werther
- Alison Pill as Charlotte
- Iris Apatow as Sissy
- Patrick J. Adams as Albert
- Amrit Kaur as Melanie

== Production ==
In May 2023, it was announced that Booth, Pill, Apatow and Adams were cast in the film.

Filming occurred at LIUNA Station in the City of Hamilton, Ontario in the month of June 2023.

In October 2023, it was announced that filming had been completed prior to the 2023 SAG-AFTRA strike.

== Critical reception ==
The film received generally positive reviews. On the review aggregator website Rotten Tomatoes, 70% of 23 critics' reviews are positive, with an average rating of 5.4/10.

In The New York Times, Brandon Yu wrote: "Booth and Pill make for a pair worth rooting for, but it’s Booth in particular, just barely but believably not of this world, who lends the film its winning sensibility. He’s helped by the film’s warmly pleasing focus, where the edges of the frame blur around the central characters, often Werther and Charlotte laughing and falling for one another. It’s as if we’re looking through a telescope, a representation of both the tunnel vision of love and also of a tragic romance of centuries past."

Writing in Variety, Dennis Harvey said: "Jose Avelino Gilles Corbett Lourenco’s debut feature is a confident, clever update. Its own jeune homme figure again suffers the torments of an impossible love. But here he finally learns what his predecessor couldn’t: That the world does not end when you don’t get what you want, and insisting it should is the height of selfishness."

However, in a review for Screen Rant, Mary Kassel wrote: "Aesthetically and linguistically, Young Werther pays tribute to its predecessors, with the work of Merchant Ivory hanging heavy over its head. It's difficult not to wish for the pastoral flourishes and grand houses of these period pieces, but the film finds some 18th-century magic in its city setting.

=== Awards ===
Award	Year	Category	Recipient	Result	Ref.
Canadian Screen Awards	2025	Best Cinematography	Nick Haight	Nominated	
Directors Guild of Canada	2024	Jean-Marc Vallée DGC Discovery Award	José Lourenço	Longlisted	
