= Melanie Oates =

Canadian writer, filmmaker and costume designer

Melanie Oates is a Canadian writer, filmmaker and costume designer, whose directorial debut feature film Body and Bones was released in 2019.

Based in St. John's, Newfoundland and Labrador, she won the Percy Janes First Novel Award in 2010 for her manuscript Hanging from the Ceiling. She subsequently worked in film and television costuming, with wardrobe credits on Republic of Doyle, Mean Dreams, and Little Dog, and costume design credits on Cast No Shadow and Closet Monster.

She directed a number of short films before releasing Body and Bones, which premiered at the 2019 Atlantic International Film Festival.

Her second feature film, Sweet Angel Baby, premiered at the 2024 Toronto International Film Festival, and was longlisted for the 2024 Jean-Marc Vallée DGC Discovery Award.

In 2025, she entered production on her third feature film, Stranger in Town, currently slated for release in 2026.
