= Siksikakowan: The Blackfoot Man =

2025 Canadian documentary film

- Directed by: Sinakson Trevor Solway
- Written by: Sinakson Trevor Solway
- Produced by: Coty Savard
- Cinematography: Sinakson Trevor Solway
- Edited by: Hans Olson
- Music by: Matthew Cardinal
- Production company: National Film Board of Canada
- Release date: April 26, 2025 (Berlin)
- Running time: 77 minutes
- Country: Canada
- Language: English

Siksikakowan: The Blackfoot Man is a Canadian documentary film, directed by Sinakson Trevor Solway and released in 2025. The film is a reflection on contemporary Indigenous Canadian masculinity, through a portrait of the lives of men from the Siksika Nation in Alberta.

The film premiered at the 2025 Hot Docs Canadian International Documentary Festival.

The film was the winner of the 2025 Jean-Marc Vallée DGC Discovery Award.
