= Yuqi Kang =

Canadian documentary filmmaker

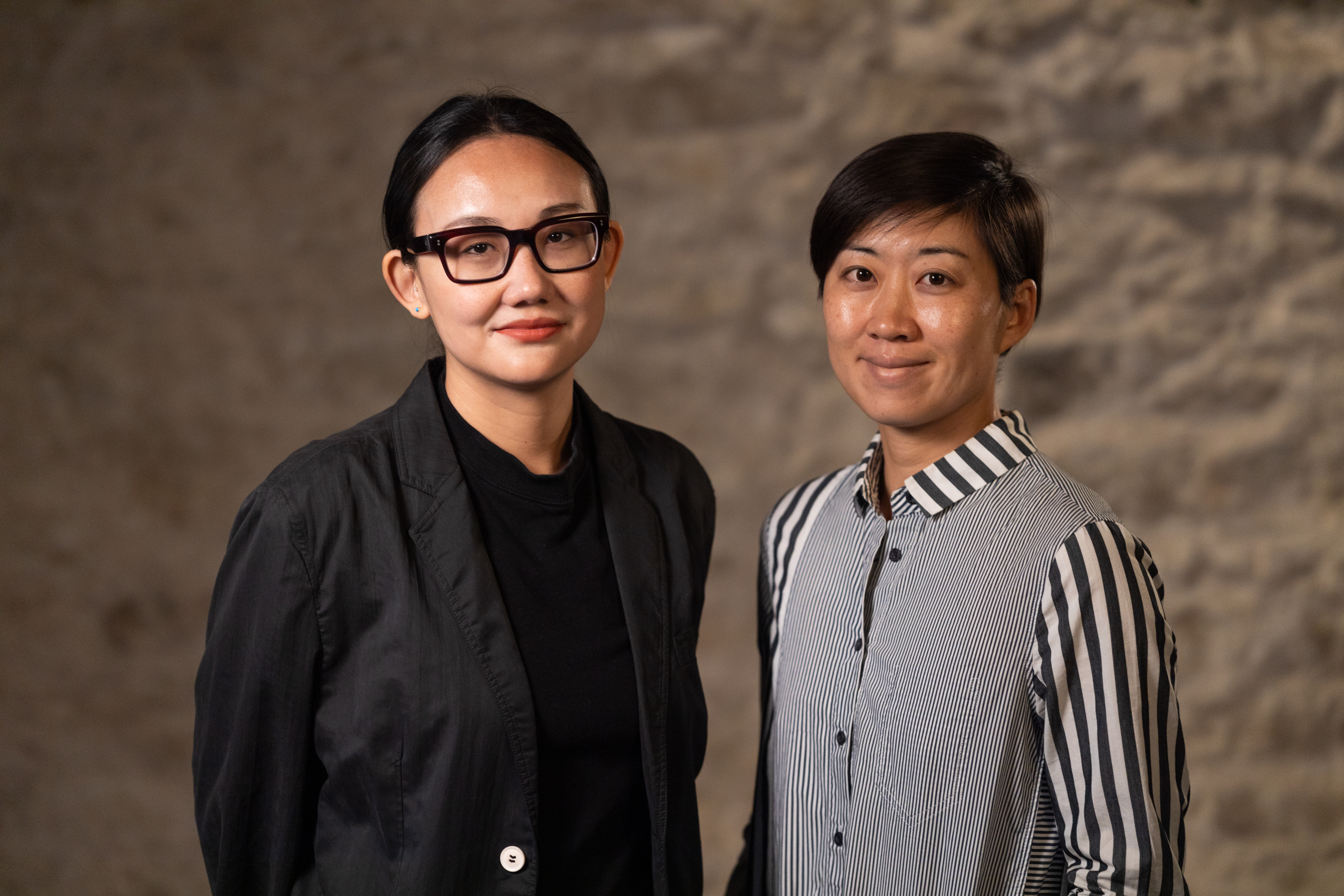
Kang in 2024

Yuqi Kang (born April 25, 1987, Mongolian Chinese: 康宇琪) is a Canadian filmmaker and producer. Her documentary debut, A Little Wisdom, premiered at the Busan International Film Festival in 2017, had its U.S. premiere at South by Southwest (SXSW), its European premiere at the Karlovy Vary International Film Festival, its Chinese premiere at the Shanghai International Film Festival, and its Canadian premiere at Hot Docs, where it won the Best Canadian Feature Documentary award in 2018. The film went on to win the Grand Jury Prize at DOC NYC, and was nominated for the 2018 Jean-Marc Vallée DGC Discovery Award and was later acquired for distribution by Amazon Prime Video.

Born in Hohhot, in the Inner Mongolia region of China, Kang is ethnically Mongolian. She was raised in Beijing before moving alone to Canada as a teenager. She studied fine arts AUArts, where she first practiced as a visual artist, before later earning an MFA in Social Documentary Film at the School of Visual Arts in New York City, where she studied on a scholarship and received the Paula Rhodes Memorial Award for Exceptional Achievement. She also completed the Directors' Lab at the Canadian Film Centre in Toronto, focusing on narrative filmmaking.

Her second feature documentary, 7 Beats per Minute, premiered in 2024 at South by Southwest (SXSW), and went on to screen at Hot Docs, the Warsaw International Film Festival, and the Hainan International Film Festival. The film was co-produced with Intuitive Pictures and the National Film Board of Canada (NFB). It won the Human Spirit Award at the Chagrin Documentary Film Festival, was nominated for the 2024 Jean-Marc Vallée DGC Discovery Award, and was theatrically released in Canada in 2025.

Fruit Is Ripe, her third feature documentary, commissioned by Telus Originals, is slated to premiere at the 2025 Calgary International Film Festival.

In 2019, Kang was named to DOC NYC’s ‘40 Under 40,’ a program recognizing emerging documentary filmmakers of distinction.
