= A Little Wisdom =

- Directed by: Yuqi Kang
- Produced by: Maro Chermayeff; Sean Farnel; Yuqi Kang
- Cinematography: Amitabh Joshi; Yuqi Kang; Paola Ochoa
- Edited by: Yuqi Kang
- Music by: Drukmo Gyal Dakimi; Martin Zaulich
- Production company: Blue Goat Films
- Distributed by: Journeyman Pictures
- Release date: October 14, 2017 (Busan)
- Running time: 92 minutes
- Country: Canada
- Language: Nepali

A Little Wisdom is a 2017 Canadian documentary film, directed by Yuqi Kang. The film depicts a group of young boys at a Buddhist monastery school in Lumbini, Nepal, centring in particular on Hopakuli, a four-year-old boy who was left at the monastery with his brother Chorten by their impoverished single mother following their father's death.

The film premiered in 2017 at the 22nd Busan International Film Festival. It had its American premiere at SXSW, and its Canadian premiere at the 2018 Hot Docs Canadian International Documentary Festival.

== Awards ==
Award	Date of ceremony	Category	Recipient(s)	Result	Ref(s)
Hot Docs Canadian International Documentary Festival	2018	Best Canadian Feature Documentary	Yuqi Kang	Won	
Directors Guild of Canada	2018	DGC Discovery Award	Yuqi Kang	Shortlisted	
Doc NYC	2018	Viewfinders Grand Jury Prize	Yuqi Kang	Won	
