= Nick Haight =

Canadian cinematographer

Nick Haight is a Canadian cinematographer. His credits have included the films Mary Goes Round, Run This Town, Clara, Learn to Swim and Young Werther, and the television series Baroness von Sketch Show, Slasher, Moonshine and Hudson & Rex.

== Awards ==
Award	Year	Category	Work	Result	Ref.
Canadian Screen Awards	2019	Best Photography in a Comedy Series	Baroness von Sketch Show: "Is That You Karen?"	Nominated	
Canadian Screen Awards	2022	Best Photography in a Drama Series	Moonshine: "Escape Goat"	Nominated	
Canadian Screen Awards	2025	Best Cinematography	Young Werther	Nominated	
