= Maya Annik Bedward =

Canadian film director and producer

Maya Annik Bedward is a Canadian film director and producer, whose feature directorial debut Black Zombie was released in 2026.

She began her career as a director and producer of short films, winning a Canadian Screen Award for Best Short Documentary as a producer of Patty vs. Patty at the 11th Canadian Screen Awards in 2023. She has also directed episodes of the television documentary series Lido TV, BLK, An Origin Story and Farm Crime, receiving CSA nominations for Best Direction in a Web Program or Series at the 11th Canadian Screen awards for Lido TV and at the 12th Canadian Screen Awards in 2024 for Farm Crime.

At the 30th Fantasia International Film Festival, Bedward won the Northern Excellence Award for Canadian Filmmaking for Black Zombie.

== Filmography ==
- The Foreigner, 2014 - director, producer
- A Hidden History: The Story of the New Orleans Tribune, 2016 - director, producer
- The Haircut, 2018 - director, producer
- Why We Fight, 2021 - director, producer
- Farm Crime, 2021-23 - director
- BLK, An Origin Story, 2022 - director
- Lido TV, 2022 - director
- Patty vs. Patty, 2022 - producer
- Black Zombie, 2026 - director, producer
