= Freedom Fields (film) =

2018 documentary film by Naziha Arebi

- Directed by: Naziha Arebi
- Release date: September 8, 2018 (Toronto International Film Festival)
- Running time: 97 minutes
- Countries: Libya, UK
- Languages: Arabic, English

Freedom Fields is a 2018 documentary film by Libyan filmmaker Naziha Arebi. The film is about soccer, feminism, and the revolution that toppled Muammar Gaddafi's rule in 2011.

== Background ==
Arebi's father is Libyan, and she grew up in the United Kingdom. Until the 2011 revolution, she had never been to her father's native land, but found herself fascinated with the sweeping changes overtaking the nation following the Arab Spring, and decided to fill in this gap in her personal history. The film, Freedom Fields, is the result of her personal and documentary investigation.

== Contents ==
The film follows three friends, Naama, Halima and Fadwa, who met on the soccer field. Their stories are told in three parts: The first occurs in 2012, a year after the revolution - a period of great hope for change, democracy and gender equality. The second part takes place in 2014, when the spirit of hope has evaporated, and is replaced with a sense of confusion and loss, after ISIS establishes their presence in Libya. The last part is in 2016, and describes the great sadness of the Libyan people as they realize the revolution was a complete failure, and if anything, they are worse off. And yet, not everyone has lost all hope, and some are still committed to the struggle for change.

The film opens with a quote from Audre Lorde's canonical feminist book from 1984, Sister Outsider:

"Sometimes we are blessed with being able to choose the time, and the arena, and the manner of our revolution, but more usually we must do battle where we are standing."

=== Part 1 ===
Upon Arebi's arrival in 2011, the Libyan revolution is at its height. She begins to document the key role played by women in leading the first protests, smuggling arms, supporting the rebels at the front; and afterwards, when they were elected to central roles in the national elections. Arebi also recorded the optimism that accompanied the unfolding events. In the course of this work, while in England, she first hears of the Libyan women's football team on an Internet message board. She asks to meet the team when she returns to Libya.

She discovers that the team has existed for 10 years, and includes more than 30 women and girls, but they have never been allowed to play a match. It is only in 2012 that the Libyan Football Association permits the team to compete for the first time, in a tournament against other Arab women's teams in Germany. The permission to play is the result of a years-long struggle, and the women view this victory as the fulfillment of the promise of the revolution, that things are changing for women in Libya. Arebi talks about this time, calling it, in hindsight, "naivete", but of a sort that infected every aspect of life and creativity, from literature, to poetry, to film-making, and that a great number of collaborations were begun at this time.

=== Part 2 ===
Soon, however, it becomes clear that there is strong opposition in addition to the optimism and desire for change. For the women's team, this means that some men are beginning to voice objections to the women playing in shorts, and that if this is what change looks like - then change is not desired. The opposition swells, especially online. Arebi documents both the opposition to the team and the women's responses, which are far from simple: The players want to play the game they love, and they also want to respect their religion and society, and are unsure how to balance these conflicting attitudes.

In the end, the team receives the news that they will not be permitted to play.

=== Part 3 ===
Two years later, the women's football team has disbanded. while the Libyan civil war has escalated. Naama, Halima and Fadwa - each in her own way - is trying to understand what happened, and to find a way to express her love of the game. "Together, we had hope, together we lost hope, and together we also renewed our hope", says Arebi.

In spite of the two year jumps in the flow of the film, Arebi continued to film and document in the gaps not covered in Freedom Fields, and is planning on showcasing her work in a second documentary, which she calls "even more tragic", called After the Revolution.

== Release ==
The film premiered at the Toronto International Film Festival in September 2018, and was selected to screen at the British Film Institute in October 2018, and continued from there to additional international festivals. Freedom Fields was nominated for the Bronze Horse award at the Stockholm International Film Festival.
