= St. John's International Women's Film Festival =

Film festival in Newfoundland and Labrador, Canada

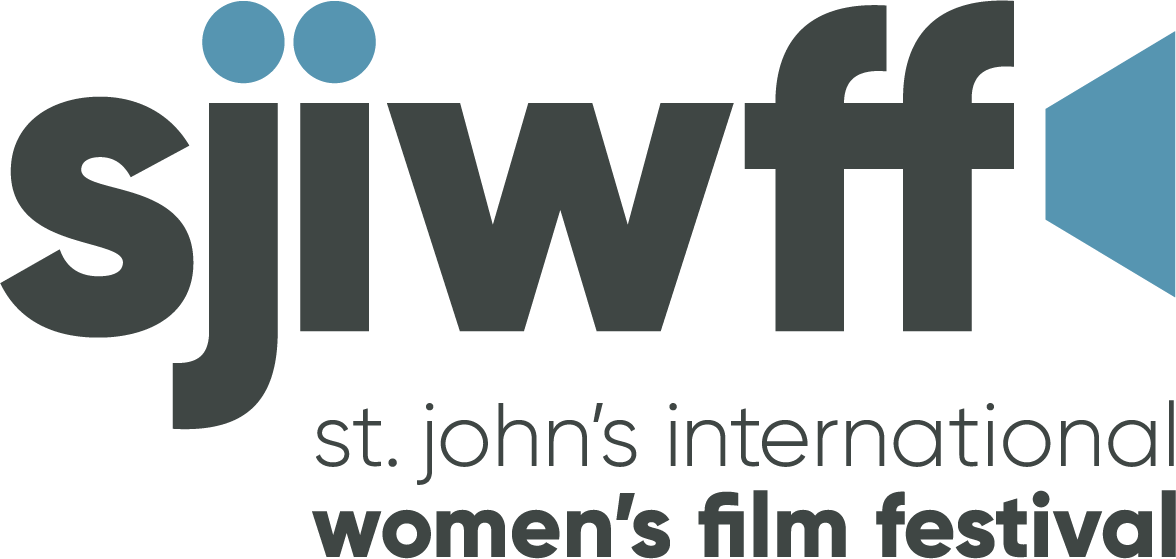
- Location: St. John's, Newfoundland and Labrador
- Established: 1989
- Most recent: October 21–25, 2025
- Awards: Most Promising Filmmaker
- Website: www.womensfilmfestival.com

St. John's International Women's Film Festival (SJIWFF) is an annual film festival based in St. John's, Newfoundland and Labrador, highlighting films by women. It is one of the longest-running festivals focusing on films made by women in the world. Established in 1989, the festival includes a year-long program of film screenings, workshops, and other events promoting women filmmakers. The main event is a five-day Film Forum in October with several thousand attendees and hundreds of submissions.

== History ==
In 1989, the festival began as a single night of screening. Established as a non-profit organization, The St. John's International Women's Film Festival adopted the mission to support and promote women filmmakers. Since its inception, the festival and organization have grown to include year-round workshops, feature and short film screenings, panels, and outreach activities, culminating in a five-day Film Forum, which attracts attendees and submissions from around the world. In 2018, more than 6500 people attended the festival. The 2020 festival was delivered virtually due to the COVID-19 pandemic.

SJIWFF screens documentaries, short films and feature work written and/or directed by women (self-identified). It features films by local Newfoundland and Labrador talent, as well as Canadian and international artists. The festival is non-competitive, as its goal is to support artists. As of 2010, the festival awards the RBC Michelle Jackson Emerging Filmmaker Award, an annual peer-juried award for the production of a short film by a promising female director.

The festival has been recognized as a leading festival and organization in the region, nationally and internationally. In December 2020, it was awarded the Boundary Pusher Award by the St John's Board of Trade's Business Resilience Awards. Local awards include the Most Valuable Player in Local Film and Television award (2015-2018) in the Best of St. John's by The Overcast newspaper, and also Best Local Art Event (2017). National honours include recognition by Telefilm Canada in 2016, for their work on gender parity, Women in Film and Television Vancouver awarded SJIWFF the Please Adjust Your Set Award in 2015 for outstanding leadership in promoting gender diversity. SJIWFF was included in USA Today's list of "10 Festivals Worth Traveling For".

In 2029, the festival is slated to host the Eurimages Audentia Award, an international award for emerging women filmmakers which is presented at a different world film festival each year.

== Michelle Jackson Emerging Filmmaker Award ==
The Michelle Jackson Emerging Filmmaker Award, named in memory of Newfoundland filmmaker Michelle Jackson, is presented annually to an emerging filmmaker from Newfoundland who has not yet directed a feature film. The award is normally presented for a short film screenplay in advance of the film's production.

- 2010 - Allison White, Decolored
- 2011 - Ruth Lawrence, Two Square Feet
- 2012 - Jackie Hynes, The Passenger
- 2013 - Tamara Segura, Before the War
- 2014 - Janina MacGillivray, The Tour
- 2015 - Wanda Nolan, Crocuses
- 2016 - Emily Bridger, Waste It
- 2017 - Kerry Gamberg, Crush
- 2018 - Latonia Hartery, The Death of Winter
- 2019 - Kerrin Rafuse, La Veillée
- 2020 - Jamie Miller, Proximity
- 2021 - Anna Wheeler, Vegas
- 2022 - Brianna Russell, Poster Child
- 2023 - Elizabeth Hicks, I Need to Get This Off My Chest
- 2024 - Alexa Jane Jerrett, Flickers
- 2025 - Andrea Dunne, Doggy Dog World
- 2026 - Zoe Cleland

== See also ==
- List of women's film festivals
- Nickel Independent Film Festival
