= Stephanie Joline =

Canadian film and television director

- Born: Stephanie Joline d'Entremont; 1983 (age 42–43); Yarmouth, Nova Scotia, Canada
- Occupations: Film director, film producer, screenwriter

Stephanie Joline (born in 1983 as Stephanie Joline d'Entremont), sometimes credited as Stephanie Clattenburg, is a Canadian film and television director. She is most noted for her work on the television documentary series Spirit Talker, for which she won the Canadian Screen Award for Best Direction in a Factual Program or Series at the 10th Canadian Screen Awards in 2022.

== Early life ==
Joline grew up in Yarmouth, Nova Scotia and is of Acadian and Inuit descent. She graduated from Nova Scotia Community College in 2004 with a Diploma in Radio Television Arts.

== Career ==
Her full-length feature film debut, Night Blooms, premiered in 2021 and was a nominee for the DGC Discovery Award.

== Personal life ==
She was formerly married to filmmaker Mike Clattenburg from 2009 to 2015.
