= Jasmin Mozaffari =

Canadian film director

- Born: یاسمین مظفری
- Occupation: Filmmaker
- Years active: 2013–present

Jasmin Mozaffari (Persian: یاسمین مظفری) is a Canadian film director and screenwriter. She won the Canadian Screen Award for Best Director at the 7th Canadian Screen Awards in 2019 for her debut feature film Firecrackers.

== Early life ==
Mozaffari was born in Saskatoon, Saskatchewan. Her father (now deceased) was an Iranian immigrant who came to Canada from Tehran at the time of the Iranian Revolution. Her mother is from Provost, Alberta. Jasmin grew up in Barrie, Ontario before moving to Toronto to attend Ryerson University for Film Studies.

== Career ==
Mozaffari graduated from Ryerson University in 2013. Her student thesis film, Firecrackers, premiered at the Toronto International Film Festival in 2013. After graduating, Jasmin directed the short films WAVE (2015), which premiered at the Vancouver International Film Festival, and sleep on the tracks (2018).

Based on her short thesis film, Mozaffari expanded Firecrackers into her first feature film. Firecrackers was made through the Telefilm Canada Talent to Watch Fund. The film premiered at the 2018 Toronto International Film Festival, and went on to screen at other film festivals around the world; it won Best Film at the Stockholm International Film Festival. In December 2018, the Toronto International Film Festival named the film to its year end Canada's Top Ten list.

The film was released in Canada and the US theatrically in 2019 and became a New York Times Critic's Pick.

She has also directed episodes of the television series Holly Hobbie and Fakes.

Her short film Motherland screened in the Short Cuts program at the 2023 Toronto International Film Festival, where it was the winner of the Best Canadian Short Film award. It was the winner of the Canadian Screen Award for Best Live Action Short Drama at the 12th Canadian Screen Awards in 2024.

== Accolades ==
In March 2019, Mozaffari won the Canadian Screen Award for Best Director at the 7th Canadian Screen Awards. Her work has been praised by The New York Times, Vulture, Los Angeles Times, The Hollywood Reporter, and Variety.

In his review of Firecrackers, Peter Debruge of Variety called Mozaffari a "major talent" and compared her to a "young Andrea Arnold."

In March 2020, Mozaffari was one of 8 writers to be selected to develop her next feature film through the Toronto International Film Festival's Writers' Studio.
