= 6th Canadian Screen Awards =

6th year of awards given by the Academy of Canadian Cinema & Television

- Date: March 11, 2018
- Location: Sony Centre for the Performing Arts; Toronto, Ontario
- Hosted by: Emma Hunter; Jonny Harris

Highlights
- Most awards: Film: Maudie (7); TV: Alias Grace, The Amazing Race Canada, Cardinal (6)
- Most nominations: Film: Ava, Hochelaga, Land of Souls, Never Steady, Never Still (8); TV: Anne with an E (13)
- Best Motion Picture: Maudie
- Best Dramatic Series: Anne with an E
- Best Comedy Series: Kim's Convenience

Television/radio coverage
- Network: CBC

The 6th annual Canadian Screen Awards were held on March 11, 2018, to honour achievements in Canadian film, television, and digital media production in 2017. Nominations were announced on January 16, 2018.

Emma Hunter and Jonny Harris hosted the ceremony, which was held at the Sony Centre for the Performing Arts in Toronto. The awards in many of the technical and craft categories were presented in a series of advance galas throughout the week, promoted to as Canadian Screen Week, leading up to the main televised ceremony. Anne with an E received the most nominations, with 13 in total.

In the film categories, Maudie won the most awards, with seven, while Alias Grace, The Amazing Race Canada, and Cardinal all tied with six wins each in the television categories.

== Film ==
Nominees and winners are:

Motion Picture	Direction
Maudie – Bob Cooper, Mary Young Leckie, Mary Sexton, Susan Mullen; Ava – Kiarash Anvari, Sadaf Foroughi; The Breadwinner – Andrew Rosen, Anthony Leo, Paul Young, Tomm Moore, Stéphan Roelants; It's the Heart That Dies Last (C'est le cœur qui meurt en dernier) – Richard Lalonde; The Little Girl Who Was Too Fond of Matches (La petite fille qui aimait trop les allumettes) – Marcel Giroux; Never Steady, Never Still – James Brown, Tyler Hagan; Ravenous (Les Affamés) – Stéphanie Morissette	Aisling Walsh, Maudie; Robin Aubert, Ravenous (Les Affamés); Alexis Durand-Brault, It's the Heart That Dies Last (C'est le cœur qui meurt en dernier); Sadaf Foroughi, Ava; Ian Lagarde, All You Can Eat Buddha
Actor in a leading role	Actress in a leading role
Nabil Rajo, Boost; Antoine L'Écuyer, The Little Girl Who Was Too Fond of Matches (La petite fille qui aimait trop les allumettes); Tzi Ma, Meditation Park; Émile Proulx-Cloutier, We Are the Others (Nous sommes les autres); Gabriel Sabourin, It's the Heart That Dies Last (C'est le cœur qui meurt en dernier)	Sally Hawkins, Maudie; Denise Filiatrault, It's the Heart That Dies Last (C'est le cœur qui meurt en dernier); Shirley Henderson, Never Steady, Never Still; Mahour Jabbari, Ava; Marine Johnson, The Little Girl Who Was Too Fond of Matches (La petite fille qui aimait trop les allumettes)
Actor in a supporting role	Actress in a supporting role
Ethan Hawke, Maudie; Sylvio Arriola, All You Can Eat Buddha; Jahmil French, Boost; Sladen Peltier, Indian Horse; Natar Ungalaaq, Iqaluit	Bahar Noohian, Ava; Oluniké Adeliyi, Boost; Lucinda Armstrong Hall, Porcupine Lake; Clare Coulter, Cross My Heart (Les Rois mongols); Brigitte Poupart, Ravenous (Les Affamés)
Original Screenplay	Adapted Screenplay
Sherry White, Maudie; Josh Epstein and Kyle Rideout, Adventures in Public School; Sadaf Foroughi, Ava; Kathleen Hepburn, Never Steady, Never Still; Sarah Kolasky and Adam Garnet Jones, Great Great Great	Anita Doron, The Breadwinner; Nicole Bélanger, Cross My Heart (Les Rois mongols); Susan Coyne, The Man Who Invented Christmas; Simon Lavoie, The Little Girl Who Was Too Fond of Matches (La petite fille qui aimait trop les allumettes); Gabriel Sabourin, It's the Heart That Dies Last (C'est le cœur qui meurt en dernier)
Feature Length Documentary	Short Documentary
Rumble: The Indians Who Rocked the World – Catherine Bainbridge, Christina Fon, Linda Ludwick, Lisa Roth, Stevie Salas, Tim Johnson, Diana Holtzberg, Jan Rofekamp, Ernest Webb; Manic – Kalina Bertin, Marina Serrao, Bob Moore, Mila Aung-Thwin, Daniel Cross; A Moon of Nickel and Ice (Sur la lune de nickel) – Christine Falco, François Jacob, Vuk Stojanovic; Resurrecting Hassan – Carlo Guillermo Proto, Roxanne Sayegh, Pablo Villegas, Maria Paz Gonzalez; Unarmed Verses – Charles Officer, Lea Marin	Take a Walk on the Wildside – Lisa Rideout, Lauren Grant, Sasha Fisher; Babe, I Hate to Go – Andrew Moir; Three Thousand – Asinnajaq, Kat Baulu
Live Action Short Drama	Animated Short
Fluffy – Lee Filipovski; The Beep Test (La Course navette) – Maxime Aubert, Audrey D. Laroche; Garage at Night (Garage de soir) – Daniel Daigle, Aurélie Breton; Plain and Simple (Tout simplement) – Raphaël Ouellet, Annick Blanc; Pre-Drink – Marc-Antoine Lemire, Maria Gracia Turgeon	The Tesla World Light – Matthew Rankin, Julie Roy; Dam! The Story of Kit the Beaver – Kjell Boersma, Josh Clavir; Fox and the Whale – Robin Joseph; Hedgehog's Home – Eva Cvijanović, Vanja Andrijević, Jelena Popović; Manivald – Chintis Lundgren, Draško Ivezić, Jelena Popović
Art Direction/Production Design	Cinematography
François Séguin, Hochelaga, Land of Souls (Hochelaga terre des âmes); Guillaume Couture, Cross My Heart (Les Rois mongols); Sophie Jarvis and Liz Cairns, Never Steady, Never Still; Siamak Karinejad, Ava; Marjorie Rhéaume, The Little Girl Who Was Too Fond of Matches (La petite fille qui aimait trop les allumettes)	Nicolas Bolduc, Hochelaga, Land of Souls (Hochelaga terre des âmes); Nicolas Canniccioni, The Little Girl Who Was Too Fond of Matches (La petite fille qui aimait trop les allumettes); Sina Kermanizadeh, Ava; Mathieu Laverdière, We Are the Others (Nous sommes les autres); Norm Li, Never Steady, Never Still
Costume Design	Editing
Trysha Bakker, Maudie; Julie Bécotte, We Are the Others (Nous sommes les autres); Mario Davignon, Hochelaga, Land of Souls (Hochelaga, terre des âmes); Brigitte Desroches, Cross My Heart (Les Rois mongols); Gabrielle Tougas-Fréchette, All You Can Eat Buddha	Stephen O'Connell, Maudie; Kiarash Anvari, Ava; Darragh Byrne, The Breadwinner; Louis-Philippe Rathé, It's the Heart That Dies Last (C'est le cœur qui meurt en dernier); Simone Smith, Never Steady, Never Still
Overall Sound	Sound Editing
Claude La Haye and Bernard Gariépy Strobl, Hochelaga, Land of Souls (Hochelaga terre des âmes); Philippe Attié, Boost; Sylvain Bellemare, All You Can Eat Buddha; Pierre Bertrand, Stéphane Bergeron, Shaun-Nicholas Gallagher and Maxime Potvin, Cross My Heart (Les Rois mongols); Matt Drake, Nate Evans and Christopher O'Brien, Never Steady, Never Still	Nelson Ferreira, John Elliot, J. R. Fountain, Dashen Naidoo and Tyler Whitham, The Breadwinner; Claude Beaugrand, Hochelaga, Land of Souls (Hochelaga, terre des âmes); Sylvain Bellemare, All You Can Eat Buddha; Marie-Claude Gagné, Bon Cop, Bad Cop 2; Christian Rivest, Antoine Morin, Thibaud Quinchon, Guy Pelletier and Guy Francœur, Goon: Last of the Enforcers
Achievement in Music: Original Score	Achievement in Music: Original Song
Mychael Danna and Jeff Danna, The Breadwinner; Viviane Audet, Robin-Joël Cool and Alexis Martin, Cross My Heart (Les Rois mongols); Pierre-Philippe Côté, Ravenous (Les Affamés); Ben Fox, Never Steady, Never Still; Terry Riley and Gyan Riley, Hochelaga, Land of Souls (Hochelaga terre des âmes)	Qais Essar and Joshua Hill, "The Crown Sleeps" – The Breadwinner; Dani Bailey, "Rid the Dark" – Hunting Pignut; Joey Sherrett, Chris Gordon and Nathaniel Huskinson, "CTS Thief" – Boost
Make-Up	Visual Effects
Erik Gosselin and Marie-France Guy, Ravenous (Les Affamés); Kathryn Casault, Hochelaga, Land of Souls (Hochelaga terre des âmes); Sonia Dolan, The Man Who Invented Christmas; Bruno Gatien, All You Can Eat Buddha; Marlène Rouleau, Bon Cop, Bad Cop 2	Alain Lachance, Yann Jouannic, Hugo Léveillé, Nadège Bozetti, Antonin Messier-Turcotte, Thibault Deloof and Francis Bernard, Hochelaga, Land of Souls (Hochelaga terre des âmes); Jonathan Piché Delorme, Fabienne Mouillac, Alain Lachance, Caroline Guagliardo, Alexandre Tremblay, Thibault Deloof and Benoit Gagnon, We Are the Others (Nous sommes les autres); Greg Behrens, Brendan Taylor, Jasmine Scott and Martin O'Brien, The Man Who Invented Christmas; Marc Hall, Jonathan Cyr, Emmanuel Bazin, Clément Natiez and Emmanuelle Gill, The Little Girl Who Was Too Fond of Matches (La petite fille qui aimait trop les allumettes); Marc Hall, The Cyclotron (Le Cyclotron)
Best Cinematography in a Documentary	Best Editing in a Documentary
Alfonso Maiorana, Rumble: The Indians Who Rocked the World; Mike McLaughlin, Unarmed Verses; Duraid Munajim, My Enemy, My Brother; Carlo Guillermo Proto, Resurrecting Hassan; Vuk Stojanovic, François Jacob and Ilya Zima, A Moon of Nickel and Ice (Sur la lune de nickel)	Benjamin Duffield and Jeremiah Hayes, Rumble: The Indians Who Rocked the World; Frank Cassano, Sled Dogs; Anouk Deschênes, Manic; François Jacob and Jéricho Jeudy, A Moon of Nickel and Ice (Sur la lune de nickel); Roland Schlimme, Long Time Running
John Dunning Discovery Award	Special awards
Black Cop – Cory Bowles, Aaron Horton; The Devout – Connor Gaston, Amanda Verhagen; Wexford Plaza – Joyce Wong, Matt Greyson, Harry Cherniak	Best First Feature: Ava – Sadaf Foroughi; Golden Screen Award: Father and Guns 2 (De père en flic 2)

== Television ==
=== Programs ===
Drama series	Comedy series
Anne; 19–2; Mary Kills People; Pure; Vikings	Kim's Convenience; Letterkenny; Michael: Every Day; Nirvanna the Band the Show; Workin' Moms
Animated program or series	Documentary program
Cloudy with a Chance of Meatballs; Beat Bugs; Camp Lakebottom; Hotel Transylvania; Wandering Wenda	Rise; Cheer Up; Kosher Love; Much Too Young; Sickboy
Children's or youth fiction	Children's or youth non-fiction
Odd Squad; Degrassi: Next Class; L.M. Montgomery's Anne of Green Gables: Fire and Dew; The Next Step	Science Max; Finding Stuff Out; The Mystery Files; This Is My Family; Undercover High
Factual Program or Series	History Documentary Program or Series
Mayday; Employable Me; Konnected.tv; Payday; Taken	The Nature of Things: "Lost Secrets of the Pyramid"; Black Watch Snipers; Hunting Nazi Treasure; Real Vikings: "Viking Women"; Searching for Vimy's Lost Soldiers
Lifestyle Program or Series	Limited Series
Property Brothers; Backyard Builds; Dead Set on Life; The Goods; Great Canadian Homes	Alias Grace; Bruno & Boots: This Can't Be Happening at Macdonald Hall; Cardinal; The Disappearance; The Kennedys: After Camelot
Biography or Arts Documentary Program or Series	Pre-School Program or Series
Rush: Time Stand Still; Exhibitionists; Extraordinary Canadians; Interrupt This Program; Leslie Caron: The Reluctant Star	PAW Patrol; The Cat in the Hat Knows a Lot About That!; Dino Dana; Justin Time; Max & Ruby
Science or Nature Documentary Program or Series (Rob Stewart Award)	Social/Political Documentary Program (Donald Brittain Award)
The Nature of Things: "The Wild Canadian Year" – Jeff Turner, Sue Turner, Caroline Underwood; Call of the Forest: The Forgotten Wisdom of Trees – Merit Jensen Carr, Jeff McKay; The Nature of Things: "The Great Wild Indoors" – David York, Bryn Hughes, Roberto Verdecchia; The Nature of Things: "Running on Empty: Surviving California's Epic Drought" – Mike Downie, David Wells; The Water Brothers – Jonathan Barker, Wendy MacKeigan, Jane Jankovic	The Secret Path – Stuart Coxe, Mike Downie, Jocelyn Hamilton, Gord Downie, Justin Stephenson, Jeff Lemire, Sarah Polley, Patrick Downie; All Governments Lie: Truth, Deception and the Spirit of I. F. Stone – Fred Peabody, Peter Raymont, Steve Ord, Andrew Munger, Jeff Cohen, Oliver Stone; Colonization Road – Michelle St. John, Brendan Brady, Jordan O'Connor, Shane Belcourt, Evan Adams; Migrant Dreams – Min Sook Lee, Lisa Valencia-Svensson; The Skin We're In – Gordon Henderson, Stuart Henderson
Sketch comedy program or series	Talk program or series
Baroness von Sketch Show; The Beaverton; Rick Mercer Report; This Hour Has 22 Minutes	The Marilyn Denis Show; CityLine; Howie Mandel: A Bell Let's Talk Special; The Social
Live entertainment special	Variety or entertainment special
2017 Juno Awards; 2016 Scotiabank Giller Prize Gala; 2017 iHeartRadio Much Music Video Awards; 5th Canadian Screen Awards; Canada Day 150! From Coast to Coast to Coast	P. K. Subban: Shots Fired; We Day 2016; The Social: Christmas with Jann Arden; Macbeth; Ron James: True North
Reality/Competition Program or Series	Golden Screen Awards
The Amazing Race Canada; The Bachelorette Canada; Big Brother Canada; Masterchef Canada; Top Chef Canada	Fiction: Murdoch Mysteries; Reality: The Amazing Race Canada

=== Actors ===
Lead actor, drama	Lead actress, drama
Alexander Ludwig, Vikings; Shawn Doyle, Bellevue; Christopher Heyerdahl, Van Helsing; Brian Markinson, The Romeo Section; Richard Short, Mary Kills People	Tatiana Maslany, Orphan Black; Caroline Dhavernas, Mary Kills People; Amybeth McNulty, Anne; Meaghan Rath, Rogue; Jennie Raymond, Sex & Violence
Lead actor, comedy	Lead actress, comedy
Paul Sun-Hyung Lee, Kim's Convenience; Gerry Dee, Mr. D; Jared Keeso, Letterkenny; Dan Levy, Schitt's Creek; Eugene Levy, Schitt's Creek	Catherine O'Hara, Schitt's Creek; Andrea Bang, Kim's Convenience; Annie Murphy, Schitt's Creek; Catherine Reitman, Workin' Moms; Jean Yoon, Kim's Convenience
Lead actor, television film or miniseries	Lead actress, television film or miniseries
Billy Campbell, Cardinal; Yannick Bisson, Murdoch Mysteries: Once Upon a Murdoch Christmas; Kim Coates, Bad Blood; Edward Holcroft, Alias Grace; Alan Thicke, It's Not My Fault and I Don't Care Anyway	Sarah Gadon, Alias Grace; Hélène Joy, Murdoch Mysteries: Once Upon a Murdoch Christmas; Maxim Roy, Bad Blood; Camille Sullivan, The Disappearance; Karine Vanasse, Cardinal
Supporting actor, drama	Supporting actress, drama
R. H. Thomson, Anne; Benz Antoine, 19–2; Greg Bryk, Mary Kills People; Ennis Esmer, Brace for Impact; Dan Petronijevic, 19–2	Allie MacDonald, Cardinal; Katy Breier, FANatic; Suzanne Clément, Versailles; Geraldine James, Anne; Madeleine Knight, X Company
Supporting actor, comedy	Supporting actress, comedy
Andrew Phung, Kim's Convenience; Dan Aykroyd, Workin' Moms; Peter Keleghan, Workin' Moms; Noah Reid, Schitt's Creek; K. Trevor Wilson, Letterkenny	Emily Hampshire, Schitt's Creek; Emma Hunter, Mr. D; Nicole Power, Kim's Convenience; Jennifer Robertson, Schitt's Creek; Naomi Snieckus, Mr. D
Performance in a children's or youth program or series	Performance in a guest role, drama series
Ella Ballentine, L.M. Montgomery's Anne of Green Gables: Fire and Dew; Amanda Arcuri, Degrassi: Next Class; Anna Cathcart, Odd Squad; Akiel Julien, The Next Step; Michela Luci, Dino Dana	Steven McCarthy, Mary Kills People; Deborah Grover, Anne; Hamza Haq, This Life; Missy Peregrym, Saving Hope; Richard Schiff, Rogue
Performance in an animated program or series	Best Performance, Sketch Comedy (Individual or Ensemble)
Martin Short, The Cat in the Hat Knows a Lot About That!; Dan Chameroy, Hotel Transylvania; Sean Cullen, Cloudy with a Chance of Meatballs; Katie Griffin, Cloudy with a Chance of Meatballs; Bryn McAuley, Hotel Transylvania	Carolyn Taylor, Meredith MacNeill, Aurora Browne and Jennifer Whalen, Baroness von Sketch Show; Mark Critch, Cathy Jones, Susan Kent, Shaun Majumder and Meredith MacNeill, This Hour Has 22 Minutes; Emma Hunter, Miguel Rivas, Aisha Alfa, Marilla Wex and Dave Barclay, The Beaverton; Rick Mercer, Rick Mercer Report

=== News and information ===
News special	News reportage, local
Global News: Fort McMurray: The Road Back; CBC News: Vimy 100; CTV News: Vimy Remembered; CTV News: Prince Harry: Journey to Invictus; Viceland: Vice Talks Weed with Justin Trudeau	Eric Rankin, Cliff Shim and Amar Parmar, CBC News: Vancouver at 6: "Kati's Story"; Katie Nicholson, Joanne Levasseur, Vera-Lynn Kubinec and Melanie Verhaeghe, CBC News Manitoba: "Surprise! Car Buyers Still Asked to Pay 100s in Extra Fees Despite New Law"; Rumina Daya, Michael Hennigar and Doug Sydora, Global News BC: "Foster Care Fight"; Tracy Tong, CTV News Toronto at 6: "Drowning of Jeremiah Perry"; Austin Delaney, CTV News Toronto at 6: "Dr. Mahavir Rekhi"
News reportage, national	Local newscast
Mike Omelus, Dawna Friesen and Carolyn Jarvis, Global National: Ontario's Troubled Probation System; Melanie Nagy and Jim Hoffman, CTV National News: East African Hunger Crisis; Keith Boag and Marie Claudet, CBC News: The National: US Election; Ioanna Roumeliotis, Michelle Gagnon and Ousama Farag, CBC News: The National: Quebec City mosque shooting; Margaret Evans, Stephanie Jenzer and Richard Devey, CBC News: The National: South Sudan	CBC News Vancouver at 6; CTV News Toronto at 6; News Hour at 6 (Calgary); News Hour at 6 (Vancouver)
National newscast	News or information series
CTV National News; CBC News: The National; CBC News Network with Ian Hanomansing; Global National	The Fifth Estate; Marketplace; Terror; W5
News anchor, local	News anchor, national
Andrew Chang, British Columbia Votes 2017; Debra Arbec, CBC News Montreal at 6; Dwight Drummond, CBC News Toronto at 6; Ken Shaw and Michelle Dubé, CTV News Toronto at 6	Heather Hiscox, CBC News Network with Heather Hiscox; Ian Hanomansing, CBC News Network with Ian Hanomansing; Lisa LaFlamme, CTV National News; Peter Mansbridge, CBC News: The National
Host or interviewer, news or information program or series	News or information program
Gillian Findlay, The Fifth Estate: "Cross Lake: This Is Where I Live"; Rosemary Barton, Power & Politics; Mark Kelley, The Fifth Estate: "The Pour"; Steve Paikin, The Agenda with Steve Paikin; Jon Woodward, W5	Suroosh Alvi, Bernardo Loyola, Peter Salisbury, Michael Kronish, Shane Smith and Eddy Moretti, Terror; Jon Woodward, Brian Mellersh, Emma Jarratt, Paul Flynn, Anton Koschany and Brett Mitchell, W5: "48 Hours"; Charlsie Agro, Tiffany Foxcroft, Simon Parubchak, Saman Malik and Bill Arnold, Marketplace: "Real Estate"; Linda Guerriero, Lynette Fortune, Aileen McBride, Gillian Findlay, Tiar Wilson and Jim Williamson, The Fifth Estate: "Cross Lake: This is Where I Live"
Host in a program or series	Host in a live program or series
Jonathan Torrens, Your Special Canada; Christine Cushing, Confucius Was a Foodie; Marilyn Denis, The Marilyn Denis Show; Matty Matheson, Dead Set on Life; Steven Sabados, Jessi Cruickshank, Shahir Massoud and Andrea Bain, The Goods	Rick Mercer, Canada Day 150! From Coast to Coast to Coast; Bryan Adams and Russell Peters, Juno Awards of 2017; Howie Mandel, 5th Canadian Screen Awards; Rick Mercer, Canada's New Year's Eve: Countdown to 2017; Ben Mulroney, Danielle Graham and Elaine Lui, eTalk at the Oscars
News or information segment
Cullen Crozier, Holly Moore and Paul Barnsley, APTN Investigates: "Against Their Will"; Madeline McNair, Paul Flynn, Brennan Lefler, Kirk Neff and Kevin Newman, W5: "The Forgotten"; George Reeves, Kayla Hounsell and André Lapalme, W5: "After Ebola"; Jerry Vienneau, Steve Bandera, Jon Woodward, Denis Langlois and Steve Grant, W5: "Creep Out"; Rosemary Barton, Lisa Laventure, Marc Robichaud and Sylvain Lepage, CBC News: The National: "Kept in the Dark"

=== Sports ===
Live sporting event	Sports analyst
2016 MLS Cup Playoffs; 2016 Grey Cup; 2017 Tim Hortons Brier; Calgary Stampede Championship Sunday	Jack Armstrong, Raptors Basketball on TSN; Ray Ferraro, 2017 IIHF World Championship; Bob McKenzie, 2017 IIHF World Championship; Byron MacDonald, 2017 World Aquatics Championships; Glen Suitor, 104th Grey Cup
Sports host	Sports play-by-play
James Duthie, TradeCentre; Ron MacLean, Rogers Hometown Hockey; Scott Russell, Road to the Olympic Games	Luke Wileman, 2016 MLS Cup Playoffs; Vic Rauter, 2017 Tim Hortons Brier; Chris Cuthbert, 104th Grey Cup; Mark Lee, 2017 World Track and Field Championships
Sports feature segment	Sports opening
The Sound of Thunder; The Mission; 2017 World Championships in Athletics; The Fifth Estate: "A Story from the Field"	2016 Grey Cup; 2017 Stanley Cup playoffs: "Do You Remember"; NHL Centennial Classic; 2017 World Championships in Athletics
Sports program or series	
Aaron Sanchez: Limitless; Journey to the Grey Cup; Lance Stroll: Growing Up Fast; Names on the Cup

=== Craft awards ===
Editorial research	Visual research
Madeline McNair, Brennan Lefler, Victor Malarek, W5: "Making a Terrorist"; Annabelle Tas, The Life-Sized City: "Paris"; Rebecca Gibson, Bernadette Smith, Madison Thomas, Taken: "Tina Fontaine"; Katie Nicholson, Katie Pedersen, Joseph Loiero, Jacques Marcoux, Saman Malik, Andrew Culbert, The Fifth Estate: "Betrayal of Trust"; Jackie Carlos, Destination: Mars	Erin Chisholm, League of Exotique Dancers; Gina Cali, Destination: Mars; Elizabeth Klinck, Quebec My Country Mon Pays; Elspeth Domville, Hunting Nazi Treasure; Elspeth Domville, Elizabeth Klinck, The Devil's Horn
Make-Up	Costume Design
Stephen Lynch, Orphan Black: "To Right the Wrongs of Many"; Erik Gosselin, Edwina Voda, 19–2: "Swimming"; Elizabeth Kuchurean, Norma Richard, Frontier: "Keetom Takooteeoo Maheekun"; Jenny Arbour, Linda Preston, Reign: "All It Cost Her"; Lynda McCormack, Dark Matter: "All the Time in the World"	Simonetta Mariano, Alias Grace; Delphine White, The Kennedys: After Camelot; Meredith Markworth-Pollack, Reign: "Pulling Strings"; Michael Ground, Frontier: "Mutiny"; Anne Dixon, Anne: "Your Will Shall Decide Your Destiny"
Photography in a comedy series	Photography in a documentary program or factual series
Gerald Packer, Schitt's Creek: "Grad Night"; Fraser Brown, Kim's Convenience: "Cardboard Jung"; Christopher Mably, Baroness von Sketch Show: "It Satisfies on a Very Basic Level"; Maya Bankovic, Workin' Moms: "Pilot"; Jim Westenbrink, Letterkenny: "Relationships"	Alex Craig, David Ehrenreich, Abandoned: "Newfoundland Coast"; Richard Thompson, Kay Burn Lim, Shark Squad: "Guadalupe: Island of the White Sharks"; Olivier Cheneval, The Life-Sized City: "Medellin"; Jeff Turner, Justin Maguire, The Nature of Things: "The Wild Canadian Year: Summer"; Van Royko, Interrupt This Program: "Jerusalem"
Photography in a drama program or series	Photography in a lifestyle or reality program or series
Steve Cosens, Cardinal; Ronald Plante, 19–2: "Labour Day"; Glen Keenan, Frontier: "Wanted"; Brendan Steacy, Alias Grace; Aaron Morton, Orphan Black: "To Right the Wrongs of Many"	Ryan Shaw, The Amazing Race Canada: "Can I See Your Kuna?"; Ryan Shaw, Alex Nadon, Top Chef Canada: "Lock It Up! It's The Finale"; Colin Hall, Ice Road Truckers: "The Ice is Right"; Dylan McNiven, etalk's Ultimate Oscar Guide 2017; Shane Geddes, The Bachelorette Canada: "L'Amour"
Photography in a news or information program, series or segment	Editing in a comedy program or series
Ed Ou, Kitra Cahana, CBC News: The National: "Dancing Towards the Light"; Richard Devey, CBC News: The National: "Disappearing Giants"; Hans Vanderzande, The Fifth Estate: "Saved at Sea"; Jim Hoffman, W5: "48 hours"	Mike Fly, Jeremy Lalonde, Baroness von Sketch Show: "It Satisfies on a Very Basic Level"; Robert Hyland, Curt Lobb, Nirvanna the Band the Show: "The Bean"; Aren Hansen, Kim's Convenience: "Date Night"; Christopher Minns, Letterkenny: "The Election"; Allan MacLean, Miles Davren, Rick Mercer Report: "Episode 7"
Editing in a dramatic program or series	Editing in a documentary program or series
Teresa De Luca, Cardinal; Jay Prychidny, Orphan Black: "To Right the Wrongs of Many"; David Coulson, Anne: "Your Will Shall Decide Your Destiny"; Annie Ilkow, 19–2: "Labour Day"; David Wharnsby, Alias Grace	Nick Hector, Canada in a Day; Jason Gatt, Canada: The Story of Us: "Service and Sacrifice"; Cathy Gulkin, Ian Sit, Where the Universe Sings: The Spiritual Journey of Lawren Harris; James Hebbard, Hunting Nazi Treasure: "The Mystery of Rommel's Gold"; Liz Rosch, The Fifth Estate: "The Disruptors"
Editing in a factual program or series	Editing in a reality or competition program or series
Derek Esposito, Hello Goodbye: "Lean on Me"; Jorge Parra, Still Standing: "Manitou Beach"; Fannie Daoust, Glenn Berman, Real Detective: "Blood Brothers"; Joanne Barnard, Odrée Lapointe, The Life-Sized City: "Medellin"; Graham Withers, Steven Budd, Payday: "Fort McMurray"	Al Manson, Jonathan Dowler, Clare Elson, John Niedzielski, Jay Prychidny, Jordan Wood, Michael Tersigni, The Amazing Race Canada: "Finale"; Dave McMahon, Miles Davren, Masterchef Canada: "Special Delivery"; Ryan Monteith, Jordan Wood, Al Manson, Seth Poulin, Michael Tersigni, Jonathan Dowler, Baun Mah, Cynthia Flengeris, Elianna Voskakis, Jon White, Angela Young, Owin Lambeck, Andrew Gurney, Wesley Finucan, Big Brother Canada: "Premiere"; Al Manson, Jonathan Dowler, Baun Mah, Kyle Martin, Mike Scott, Andrew Gurney, Top Chef Canada: "Lock It Up! It's The Finale"; Michael Tersigni, Jonathan Dowler, Cynthia Flengeris, Clare Elson, David Yenovkian, Wesley Finucan, The Amazing Race Canada: "Who Wants to Be the Python?"
Production design/art direction in a fiction program or series	Production design/art direction in a non-fiction program or series
Arvinder Grewal, Alias Grace; Jean-François Campeau, Friday Myers, Andrew Berry, Anne: "I Am No Bird, And No Net Ensnares Me"; Rob Gray, Dennis Davenport, Ian Greig, Cardinal; Aidan Leroux, Joel Richardson, Rob Hepburn, Phillip Barker, Reign: "A Bride. A Box. A Body"; Gord Barnes, Frontier: "Mutiny"	Peter Faragher, Kevin Halliday, Aaron Scholl, Andy Roskaft, Big Brother Canada: "Finale"; Peter Faragher, Canada's Smartest Person: "Episode 301"; David Blanchard, Donald McEwen, Brendan Mahon, Real Detective: "Lambs to the Slaughter"; Peter Faragher, Kevin Halliday, Top Chef Canada: "All-Stars Assemble"; Callum Maclachlan, Mark Hockin, 2017 Indspire Awards
Sound in a fiction program or series	Sound in a non-fiction program or series
Martin Lee, Ian Rankin, Daniel Birch, Brent Pickett, Dale Sheldrake, Steve Medeiros, Brennan Mercer, Jane Tattersall, David McCallum, Goro Koyama, Yuri Gorbachow, Vikings: "The Reckoning"; Zenon Washuck, Jill Purdy, Kevin Howard, Nathan Robitaille, J.R. Fountain, Joe Mancuso, Richard Calistan, Steve Hammond, Alan DeGraaf, Mike Woroniuk, X Company: "The Hunt"; Marco Dolle, David Yonson, John Elliot, Clive Turner, Alastair Gray, Orest Sushko, Janice Ierulli, Dave Johnson, Mark Shnuriwsky, Frontier: "Cannonball"; David McCallum, Goro Koyama, Jane Tattersall, Martin Lee, Nelson Ferreira, Paul Germann, Sandra Fox, Stacy Coutts, Don White, Cardinal; Rick Penn, Jamie Sulek, Devin Doucette, Kieran Sherry, Rob Ainsley, Clive Turner, Letterkenny: "Relationships"	Sanjay Mehta, Ian Rodness, Steve Blair, Dustin Harris, Where the Universe Sings: The Spiritual Journey of Lawren Harris; Daniel Pellerin, Sanjay Mehta, Jeremy Fong, The River of My Dreams: A Portrait of Gordon Pinsent; Simon Brien, Patrice Gill, Sébastien Bédard, Jeremy Reid, Real Detective: "Puppet Master"; Dustin Harris, Jeremy Kessler, Steve Blair, Deanna Marano, The Water Brothers: "Flying Rivers"; Sanjay Mehta, Jason Milligan, Ian Rodness, Steve Blair, All Governments Lie: Truth, Deception and the Spirit of I. F. Stone
Sound in an animated program or series	Visual effects
Richard Spence-Thomas, Tim Muirhead, Kyle Peters, Patton Rodrigues, Ryan Ongaro, PAW Patrol: "Mission PAW: Quest for the Crown"; Sean Pearson, Michael Mancuso, Eric Bell, Andrew McDonnell, Simon Berry, The ZhuZhus: "Wingin' It"; Sean Pearson, Simon Berry, Andrew McDonnell, Sue Robertson, Max & Ruby: "Max and Ruby's Museum Adventure"; Jeff Davis, Fanny Riguidel, Melanie Eng, Cloudy with a Chance of Meatballs: "When I Was Your Age"	Bill Halliday, Dominic Remane, Michael Borrett, Paul Wishart, Ovidiu Cinazan, Jim Maxwell, Kieran McKay, Isabelle Alles, Thomas Morrison, Leann Harvey, Vikings: "On the Eve"; Michael Gibson, Danny McNair, Tom Turnbull, Geoff Marshall, Chloe Tse, Frederic St-Arnaud, Kirk Brillon, Carrie Richardson, Alias Grace; Lawren Bancroft-Wilson, Kerrington Harper, Erica Henderson, Justin Reimer, Armand Vladau, Henrique Reginato, Karina Partington, Paul Furminger, Tristan Patrick, Will Wallace, Dark Matter: "Nowhere to Go"; Geoff D.E. Scott, Sarah Wormsbecher, Eric Doiron, Nathaniel Larouche, Anthony DeChellis, Katarzyna Cieryt, Aaron Wright, Kaiser Thomas, Jason Snea, Lon Molnar, Orphan Black: "To Right the Wrongs of Many"; Michael Gibson, Danny McNair, Anthony Patterson, Lara Osland, Shoban Narayanan, John Coldrick, Tony Cybulski, Pranjal Choudhary, Killjoys: "Wargasm"
Casting	
Jon Comerford, Lisa Parasyn, Cardinal; Jenny Lewis, Sara Kay, Letterkenny; Deirdre Bowen, Kim's Convenience; Susan Forrest, Sharon Forrest, Mary Kills People; Stephanie Gorin, Anne

=== Directing ===
Children's or youth	Comedy
John Kent Harrison, L.M. Montgomery's Anne of Green Gables: Fire & Dew; J. J. Johnson, Odd Squad: "The Cherry On-Top-Inator/Sir"; Derby Crewe, The Next Step: "A New Regime"; Graeme Lynch, Cheer Squad: "Three-peat?"; J. J. Johnson, Dino Dana: "Mega Tooth"	Jacob Tierney, Letterkenny: "The Election"; Tracey Deer, Mohawk Girls: "Traitor"; Paul Fox, Schitt's Creek: "New Car"; T. W. Peacocke, Schitt's Creek: "Grad Night"; Aleysa Young, Kim's Convenience: "Date Night"
Documentary or factual series	Documentary program
Rebecca Snow, Real Vikings: "Viking Woman"; Karen Cho, Interrupt This Program: "Havana"; Kenneth Hirsch and Jeremy Benning, Extraordinary Canadians: "Douglas Coupland on Marshall McLuhan"; Jeff Turner, The Wild Canadian Year: "Winter"; Joe Wiecha, Rogue Earth: "Fort Mac Wildfire"	Trish Dolman, Canada in a Day; Fred Peabody, All Governments Lie: Truth, Deception and the Spirit of I. F. Stone; Judith Pyke, Cracking Cancer; Mick Grogan, Building Star Trek; Robin Bicknell, Black Watch Snipers
Dramatic program or mini–series	Dramatic series
Mary Harron, Alias Grace; Jon Cassar, The Kennedys: After Camelot; T. W. Peacocke, Murdoch Mysteries: Once Upon a Murdoch Christmas; Peter Stebbings, The Disappearance; Daniel Grou, Cardinal	Holly Dale, Mary Kills People: "The River Styx"; Jeff Woolnough, Vikings: "Revenge"; Ken Girotti, Pure: "Ordination"; Helen Shaver, Anne: "I Am No Bird, And No Net Ensnares Me"; Niki Caro, Anne: "Your Will Shall Decide Your Destiny"
Lifestyle or information	Live sporting event
Dave Russell, Canada Day 150! From Coast to Coast to Coast; Frank Samson, Lady Antebellum Special; Gillian Parker, Howie Mandel: A Bell Let's Talk Day Special; Les Stroud, Survivorman & Son: "Mongolia"; James Wilkes, Masters of Flip: "Think Pink"	Richard Wells, 2016 MLS Cup Playoffs; Andy Bouyoukos, 2017 Tim Hortons Brier Final; Andy Bouyoukos, 2016 Grey Cup; Ron Forsythe, Calgary Stampede Championship Sunday
Reality or competition program or series	Variety or sketch comedy program or series
Rob Brunner, The Amazing Race Canada: "Finale"; Frank Samson, Survivor Special; Dave Russell, Canada's Smartest Person: "Episode 301"; Jermaine Bagnall and Stephan Peterson, Ice Road Truckers: "The Ice is Right"; Rob Brunner, Top Chef Canada: "Lock It Up! It's The Finale"	Yael Staav, Baroness von Sketch Show: "It Satisfies on a Very Basic Level"; Shelagh O'Brien and Craig David Wallace, The Beaverton: "Episode 201"; Henry Sarwer-Foner, Rick Mercer Report: "Episode 11"; Mars Horodyski, Michael Lewis and Aleysa Young, This Hour Has 22 Minutes: "Episode 17"; Dave Russell, Juno Awards of 2016
Animated program or series
Charles E. Bastien, PAW Patrol: "Mission PAW: Quest for the Crown"; Matt Ferguson, Mysticons: "Scourge of the Seven Skies"; Robin Budd, Hotel Transylvania: "Adventures in Vampiresitting"; Johnny Darrell and Andrew Duncan, Cloudy with a Chance of Meatballs: "Your Fish is My Command"; Derek Prout, Max & Ruby: "Community Garden/Ruby's Backyard Camping Trip"

=== Music ===
Non-fiction program or series	Fiction program or series
Gord Downie, Kevin Drew and Dave Hamelin, The Secret Path; Guillaume Coutu Dumont, The Life-Sized City: "Medellin"; Michael Richard Plowman, Avenues of Escape; Philip Strong and Thomas Hoy, Little India: Village of Dreams; John Welsman, Where the Universe Sings: The Spiritual Journey of Lawren Harris	Todor Kobakov, Cardinal; Amin Bhatia and Ari Posner, Anne: "Remorse Is the Poison of Life"; Amin Bhatia and Ari Posner, X Company: "Remembrance"; Jeff Danna and Mychael Danna, Alias Grace; Jonathan Goldsmith, Pure: "Ordination"
Animated program or series	
Steffan Andrews, Cloudy with a Chance of Meatballs: "Bacon Girl"; Serge Côté, Jaxon and Song's Maple Mystery; Christian Szczesniak, Mysticons: "The Coronation"; Nerida Tyson-Chew, The Deep: "The Baltic Sea Anomaly"

=== Writing ===
Children's or youth	Comedy
Adam Peltzman and Tim McKeon, Odd Squad: "Drop Gadget Repeat/20 Questions"; Susan Coyne, L.M. Montgomery's Anne of Green Gables: Fire and Dew; Sarah Glinski, Degrassi: Next Class: "#IRegretNothing"; Matt Huether, Degrassi: Next Class: "#ImSleep"; Rachael Schaefer, The Next Step: "A New Regime"	Jacob Tierney and Jared Keeso, Letterkenny: "Relationships"; Dan Levy, Schitt's Creek: "Opening Night"; Anita Kapila, Kim's Convenience: "Resting Place"; Matt Kippen, Kim's Convenience: "Business Award"; Jay McCarrol, Matthew Miller, Robert Hyland, Curt Lobb, Jared Raab and Andrew Appelle, Nirvanna the Band the Show: "The Bean"
Documentary	Dramatic program or miniseries
Robert Osborne, Unstoppable: The Fentanyl Epidemic; Norm Christie, Searching for Vimy's Lost Soldiers; Mick Grogan, Building Star Trek; Hugh Hardy, Hunting Nazi Treasure: "City of Loot"; David Paperny and Ted Tozer, Mohamed Fahmy: Half Free	Sarah Polley, Alias Grace; Michael Konyves, Bad Blood; Aubrey Nealon, Cardinal; Geneviève Simard and Normand Daneau, The Disappearance; Carol Hay, Michelle Ricci and Paul Aitken, Murdoch Mysteries: Once Upon a Murdoch Christmas
Drama series	Factual program or series
Graeme Manson and Renee St. Cyr, Orphan Black: "To Right The Wrongs of Many"; Emily Andras, Wynonna Earp: "I Hope You Dance"; Tara Armstrong, Mary Kills People: "Bloody Mary"; Marsha Greene, Mary Kills People: "Wave the White Flag"; Moira Walley-Beckett, Anne: "I Am No Bird, And No Net Ensnares Me"	Jonny Harris, Fraser Young, Steve Dylan and Graham Chittenden, Still Standing: "Fort McMurray"; Jenypher Fisher, Wild Bear Rescue: "A Cub with a Kick"; Michel D. T. Lam, Mikael Colville-Andersen, Nicolas Boucher and Myriam Berthelet, The Life-Sized City: "Medellin"; Todd Serotiuk and Catharine Parke, Heavy Rescue: 401: "Anything Can Happen"; Eric Sorensen, Global National: "Mega "Moonlight" Mistake"
Lifestyle or reality/competition program or series	Variety or sketch comedy program or series
Mark Lysakowski, Jennifer Pratt and Rob Brunner, The Amazing Race Canada: "We Just Saw Johnny Mustard"; Eric Abboud and Jessica Capobianco, Top Chef Canada: "All-Stars Assemble"; Kim Clarke Champniss and Jean Paul, Juno Awards of 2017; Mark Lysakowski, Rob Brunner and Matthew Hanson, The Amazing Race Canada: "Can I See Your Kuna?"; Les Stroud, Survivorman & Son: "Mongolia"	Carolyn Taylor, Meredith MacNeill, Aurora Browne, Jennifer Whalen, Jennifer Goodhue, Monica Heisey, Mae Martin and Zoe Whittall, Baroness von Sketch Show: "It Satisfies on a Very Basic Level"; Mark Critch, Bob Kerr, Mike Allison, Susan Kent, Greg Thomey, Heidi Brander, Adam Christie, Scott Vrooman, Matt Wright, Rebecca Raftus, Emma Overton and Dean Jenkinson, This Hour Has 22 Minutes: "Episode 4"; Jeff Detsky, Luke Gordon Field, Alexander Saxton, Jacob Duarte Spiel, Kurt Smeaton, Pat Dussault, Nile Séguin, Wendy Litner and Winter Tekenos Levy, The Beaverton: "Episode 201"; Rick Mercer, Greg Eckler, Tim Steeves, George Westerholm, Rick Currie and Chris Finn, Rick Mercer Report: "Episode 7"
Animated program or series	
Sean Jara, Mysticons: "Sisters in Arms"; Craig Brown, 3 Amigonauts: "Cheese Your Own Adventure"; Mark Edwards, Cloudy with a Chance of Meatballs: "So I Married a Watermelon"; Mark Steinberg, Hotel Transylvania: "Adventures in Vampiresitting"; Betsy Walters, Cloudy with a Chance of Meatballs: "When I Was Your Age"	

== Digital media ==
Cross-Platform Project, fiction	Cross-Platform Project, Non-Fiction
Wynonna Earp Digital; The Beaverton Digital; Orphan Black: The Game; Thornwood Heights Interactive	Canada: The Story of Us 360; Confucius Was a Foodie: Interactive Experience; Home to Win Integrated Digital Strategy; Sweat the City: STC App; The Water Brothers: Dive Deeper
Cross-Platform Project, Children's	Immersive Experience
Odd Squad 1.5; Compubot: Annedroids; Dotopedia; Opie's Home; Winston Steinburger and the Distractor Beam	Miyubi; Blasters of the Universe; Blind Vaysha VR; Horizon; Through the Masks of Luzia
Original Interactive Production	Original Program or Series, fiction
The Space We Hold; I Spy (With My 5 Eyes); Shuyan Saga	peopleWatching; Played; Rakhee Morzaria's Note to Self; Soggy Flakes; Terrific Women
Original Program or Series, Non-Fiction	Direction, Web Program or Series
Secret Alberta: The Former Life of Amber Valley; Canuck & I; Hungry Month of March; Reggie from the Road; Vice Canada Reports	Sam Zvibleman, The Neddeaus of Duqesne Island; Heath Affolter, Jon Affolter, Nathan Affolter and Thomas Affolter, Soggy Flakes; Drew Lightfoot, Horizon; Daniel Roher, Sourtoe: The Story of the Sorry Cannibal; D. W. Waterson, That's My DJ
Actor, Web Program or Series	Actress, Web Program or Series
Peter Oldring, This Is That; Lloyd Ahlquist, Epic Studios; Ryan Cowie, Android Employed; Peter New, Soggy Flakes; Aaron Schroeder, The Neddeaus of Duqesne Island	Emma Hunter, Save Me; Sarah Hennessey, Terrific Women; Stephanie Kaliner, Terrific Women; Tara Samuel, The Neddeaus of Duqesne Island; Hannan Younis, peopleWatching
Host, Web Program or Series	
Dave Keystone, Small Talk; Emily Anonuevo, Like a Tourist; Sam Dunn, Lock Horns; Connie Walker, CBC News: Missing and Murdered	

== Multiple nominations and awards ==
Films that received multiple nominations
Nominations	Film
8	Ava
8	Hochelaga, Land of Souls
8	Never Steady, Never Still
7	The Little Girl Who Was Too Fond of Matches
7	Maudie
6	All You Can Eat Buddha
6	The Breadwinner
6	Cross My Heart
6	It's the Heart That Dies Last
5	Boost
5	Ravenous

Films that received multiple awards
Awards	Film
7	Maudie
4	The Breadwinner
4	Hochelaga, Land of Souls
3	Rumble: The Indians Who Rocked the World
2	Ava

Shows that received multiple nominations
Nominations	Show
13	Anne
12	Cardinal
12	Kim's Convenience
11	Alias Grace
11	Schitt's Creek
9	Letterkenny
9	Mary Kills People
8	CBC News: The National
8	Cloudy with a Chance of Meatballs
8	the fifth estate
8	W5
7	The Amazing Race Canada
6	19–2
6	Baroness von Sketch Show
6	Orphan Black
6	Top Chef Canada
5	2016 Grey Cup
5	Frontier
5	Hotel Transylvania
5	The Life-Sized City
5	Rick Mercer Report
5	Vikings
5	Workin' Moms

Shows that received multiple awards
Awards	Show
6	Alias Grace
6	The Amazing Race Canada
6	Cardinal
5	Baroness von Sketch Show
3	2016 MLS Cup
3	Kim's Convenience
3	Orphan Black
3	PAW Patrol
3	Schitt's Creek
3	Vikings

== Special awards ==
Several special awards were given:

- Lifetime Achievement Award: Peter Mansbridge
- board of directors Award: Margaret Atwood, Jay Switzer
- Earle Grey Award: Clark Johnson
- Fan Choice Award: Elise Bauman
- Gordon Sinclair Award: Karyn Pugliese
- Margaret Collier Award: Denis McGrath
- Outstanding Media Innovation Award: Pat Ellingson
- Icon Award: Rick Mercer Report
- Humanitarian Award: Bell Let's Talk
