= Trish Dolman =

Canadian film director

Trish Dolman is a Canadian film and television director and producer. She is most noted for her 2017 documentary film Canada in a Day, for which she won the Canadian Screen Award for Best Direction in a Documentary Program at the 6th Canadian Screen Awards in 2018.

She is also the founder of Screen Siren Pictures Inc., a production studio based in Vancouver, British Columbia. Her other credits as a director include the documentary films Ice Girls, Exit Kingsway and Eco-Pirate: The Story of Paul Watson, while her credits as a producer or executive producer include the feature films Flower & Garnet, Year of the Carnivore, Daydream Nation, Foreverland, Hector and the Search for Happiness, Hello Destroyer and Indian Horse, the documentary series Girl Racers and British Columbia: An Untold History, and the TV movies Pants on Fire, Luna: Spirit of the Whale, Reservation Soldiers and The Bridge.

== Career ==
Dolman founded Screen Siren Pictures in 1997, and produced its first short called White Cloud, Blue Mountain directed by Keith Behrman. In 2003 the production studio completed its first feature film Flower & Garnet directed by Keith Behrman. Screen Siren Pictures added Christine Haebler as a producer partner in 2009. The studio has produced an equal amount of documentaries and feature films with partnerships across Canada and in Europe.

Dolman sits as cochairman of the CFTPA's (Canadian Film and Television Production Association) "green team" that moderated the panel called “The Need to Go Green in the Production Sector" in Ottawa at the Prime Time conference in 2008. The committee encourages filmmakers use environmentally friendly ways to produce films. The panel session highlighted filmmakers that follow sustainable production best practices such as Brian Hamilton of Omni Film Productions on the CTV's dramatic series Robson Arms, as they encouraged public transiting or carpooling to the set and only printed on recycled paper. She also sits on the advisory committee for the Academy of Canadian Cinema and Television.

Companies that Dolman has directed and produced for include: AETN, BBC, CBC, CTV, Global, TVO, Movie Central, TWN, W Channel, The Biography Channel, Discovery Channel, Vision TV, Knowledge Network, SCN, Odeon Films, Alliance Atlantis, Fireworks International and the National Film Board of Canada.

== Collaborations ==
Dolman has held producer roles in many of the feature films she has worked on. She has collaborated with many different directors and is stated to have co-production experience, as Christine Haebler (co-producer of Screen Siren Pictures) says, "Had she not had the co-production experience we couldn't have done it" referring to their film Daydream Nation. During the pre-production phase of Daydream Nation both producers experienced shortcomings because the lead actor Scott Speedman fell through and funding partners dropped off. Dolman looked east for funding in Toronto and partnered with Film Farm and the film became a production of collaborations from the west coast to the east.

In 2017, Dolman co-produced Indian Horse, a film based on the novel Indian Horse written by Richard Wagamese. Director Stephen Campanelli brought a cut of the film to Hollywood and showed his business partner Clint Eastwood. Eastwood later signed on to be the executive producer of the film.

Dolman has continued to collaborate with other directors and filmmaking professionals. She encourages partnerships amongst provinces, "Co-productions give you access to the whole country's talent which helps to get films seen," says the producer in an interview.

== Awards and honours ==
In 2003, Keith Behrman received several Genie nominations and won Best Feature Film by First-Time Director for Flower & Garnet produced by Trish Dolman. Dolman was also the youngest recipient of the Woman of the Year award from Women in Film and Television and Video Vancouver in 2003. In the same year Ice Girls directed by Dolman collected three Leo Awards for Best Director, Best Editor and Best Program in the sports category. The first feature film produced by Screen Siren Pictures The Score was nominated for two Genie Awards in 2005. In 2010, Dolman was named one of the 100 Most Influential Women in British Columbia by the Vancouver Sun. In 2012, Daydream Nation directed by Michael Goldbach was nominated for four Leo Awards and won Best Cinematography in a Theatrical Film. Dolman later went on to win a Canadian Screen Award for Best Director for Canada In A Day in 2017.

== Filmography ==
Filmography
Film	Role	Year
Flower & Garnet	Producer	2002
Britannia Beach	Co-producer with Selwyn Jacob	2002
Ice Girls	Writer/Director/Producer	2002
Drawing Out the Demons	Co-producer with Stephanie Symns	2004
The Score	Producer	2005
Girl Racers	Executive Producer	2005
Breaking Ranks	Co-producer with Leah Mallen	2006
Luna: Spirit of the Whale	Producer	2007
Reservation Soldiers	Executive Producer	2007
Year of the Carnivore	Co-producer with Simone Urdl & Jennifer Weiss	2009
The First Movie	Co-producer with Gill Parry	2010
Foreverland	Co-producer with Christine Haebler, Aaron L. Gilbert	2011
Daydream Nation	Co-producer with Christine Haebler, Simone Urdl, Jennifer Weiss	2011
Eco-Pirate: The Story of Paul Watson	Writer/Director/Producer	2011
Hector and the Search for Happiness	Co-producer with Judy Tossell, Klaus Dohle, Christine Haebler	2014
Some Kind of Love	Co-producer with Barbara Sumner-Burstyn	2015
Indian Horse	Co-producer with Clint Eastwood, Paula Devonshire, Christine Haebler	2017
Canada in a Day	Director	2017
Bud Empire	Executive Producer	2018
The New Corporation: The Unfortunately Necessary Sequel	Producer	2018
Citizen Bio	Director, Co-Executive Producer	2020
British Columbia: An Untold History	Executive Producer	2021
How We Stand	Producer	2026
