= Sara dar dah daghigh-eh =

- Directed by: Sadaf Foroughi
- Produced by: Sadaf Foroughi
- Cinematography: Kiarash anvari, Babak Anvari, Vincent Arnaud
- Release date: 2007
- Running time: 10 minutes
- Country: Iran
- Language: Persian

Sara dar dah daghigh-eh (2007) (translation: Sara in Ten Minutes) is an Iranian short documentary film directed by Sadaf Foroughi.

== Plot ==
In search of happiness, Sara immerses herself in her imagination. She is a fourteen-year-old girl who has lived in an orphanage since birth. She does not know anything about her past or her real identity. The film shows extracts of the colorful images from her dreams.
