= All Governments Lie: Truth, Deception and the Spirit of I. F. Stone =

All Governments Lie: Truth, Deception, and the Spirit of I.F. Stone
- Directed by: Fred Peabody
- Produced by: Peter Raymont; Andrew Munger; Steve Ord
- Cinematography: John Westheuser
- Edited by: Jim Munro; James Yates
- Music by: Mark Korven
- Production company: White Pine Pictures
- Distributed by: Super Channel; Société Radio-Canada
- Release date: September 9, 2016 (TIFF)
- Running time: 91 minutes
- Country: Canada
- Language: English

All Governments Lie: Truth, Deception, and the Spirit of I.F. Stone is a 2016 Canadian documentary film directed by Fred Peabody. It had its world premiere at the Toronto International Film Festival on September 9, 2016. The film profiles several independent journalists inspired by the late I. F. Stone, a Washington-based independent journalist who published I.F. Stone’s Weekly from 1953 to 1971.

== Synopsis ==
The film follows several independent, investigative journalists who have been inspired by the example of I. F. Stone (1907–89), who was known for digging into public records and back-page stories to track down and expose stories the mainstream corporate news media were ignoring. We see the challenges these reporters face today as they dig for the truth, rather than acting as “stenographers to power”. John Carlos Frey investigates the cover-up of mass graves of undocumented immigrants who died while crossing the U.S./Mexico border. The film looks at independent journalistic investigations of governments dating back to the 1960s and manages to retain a nonpartisan point of view.

== Cast ==
- I. F. Stone – Investigative journalist
- Chris Hedges – former correspondent, The New York Times
- Leslie Moonves – president, CBS
- Jeff Cohen – founding director, Park Center for Independent Media
- Matt Taibbi – Contributing Editor, Rolling Stone magazine
- John Carlos Frey – Independent journalist
- Erin McLaughlin – reporter, CNN
- Ralph Nader – author and political activist
- Amy Goodman – host and executive producer, Democracy Now!
- Jeremy Scahill – co-founder, The Intercept
- Glenn Greenwald – co-founder, The Intercept
- Jeremy J. Stone – son of I. F. Stone

== Production ==
All Governments Lie: Truth, Deception, and the Spirit of I.F. Stone is a theatrical documentary created by a team of Emmy Award-winning filmmakers, who subscribed to I. F. Stone’s newsletter in their teens. It was produced in co-operation with Jeremy J. Stone, the son of I.F. Stone. Oliver Stone was executive producer.

== Reviews ==
"All Governments Lie: Truth, Deception, and the Spirit of I.F. Stone" is an urgent and fascinating documentary. Even if you belong to the choir it’s preaching to, it has the rare distinction of being a movie you can agree and argue with at the same time. The title makes it sound like a portrait of I.F. Stone, the trend-setting investigative journalist (he died in 1989) who in his highly influential self-published newsletter, I.F. Stone’s Weekly, tweaked and railed against the sins of the U.S. government — and the mainstream media, though back then it was known simply as, you know, journalism — from the early ’50s through the early ’70s. Stone, you could argue, was the missing link between Thomas Paine and the Internet. "All Governments Lie" treats him as the original political blogger, though it doesn’t offer much more than a thumbnail sketch of Stone. His gadfly spirit hovers over the movie, but his life and work occupy maybe 10 minutes of it.

The movie tips its hat to people like Amy Goodman, whose global news program "Democracy Now!" straddles radio, TV, and the Web, and John Carlos Frey, who we see reporting a cataclysmic story about 200 Mexican immigrants whose bodies were discovered in mass graves in Brooks County, Texas, 70 miles from the border. Mostly, though, "All Governments Lie" focuses on big game like the run-up to the Iraq War, which it uses to illustrate the thesis that the mainstream media — all of it — has become a bought-and-paid-for tool of government and corporate power.

All Governments Lie: Truth, Deception and the Spirit of I.F. Stone: A suitably provocative Canadian documentary that premiered at TIFF 2016 and returns for a run at the Hot Docs Ted Rogers Cinema, All Governments Lie borrows its title from a saying by I. F. Stone, an American investigative journalist whose long-running weekly newsletter set a standard for those who speak truth to power.

This timely doc from Vancouver filmmaker Fred Peabody examines the importance of independent journalism in a media landscape defined by unprecedented dishonesty on the part of politicians, fake news and compromised media conglomerates increasingly reluctant to investigate or criticize government policies.

Director Fred Peabody's film shows the example I. F. Stone set for modern muckrakers such as Michael Moore, Glenn Greenwald and Amy Goodman, all of whom emphasize the importance of independent journalism in an age when so much of the media is controlled by the rich and powerful and when so much news and opinion - especially in the age of Trump - seems entirely unencumbered by facts.

Film Journal International's Chris Barsanti, in one of the film's only negative reviews, wrote that the "Agitprop denunciatory takedown of corporate news doesn’t do justice to I.F. Stone’s wit or insight." Barsanti's criticism highlighted that the film "takes a valid critique of the deadening effect corporate-government synergy can have on mainstream media’s ability to truly afflict the comfortable and comfort the afflicted, and undercuts it with poor logic and simplistic argument."

== Awards ==
All Governments Lie received an Emmy nomination for “Outstanding Politics and Government Documentary” after it was broadcast on STARZ.

The film received the Directors Guild of Canada “Alan King Award for Excellence in Documentary”

It was also a short-listed nominee for the Donald Brittain Award at the 6th Canadian Screen Awards.
