= Canada in a Day =

2017 Canadian television documentary film

- Directed by: Trish Dolman
- Music by: Dan Mangan; Michael Brook
- Country of origin: Canada
- Original language: English

Production
- Producers: Trish Dolman; Christine Haebler
- Editor: Nick Hector
- Running time: 75 minutes
- Production company: Screen Siren

Original release
- Network: CTV
- Release: July 1, 2017

Canada in a Day is a Canadian television documentary film directed by Trish Dolman, which aired on CTV in 2017. Created to mark the 150th anniversary of Canada in 2017 and inspired by the 2011 film Life in a Day, the film portrayed a snapshot of Canadian life over a period of 24 hours.

In 2016, CTV announced that people across Canada were being invited to film the events of their lives on September 10, 2016. A total of 16,818 videos were received, which were then distilled into a two-hour film by Dolman and editor Nick Hector. Out of all the country-specific Life in a Day sequels that have been released since 2011, Canada in a Day received the third-highest number of submissions behind only Italy in a Day and Spain in a Day.

The film premiered on CTV on June 25, 2017, and was repeated on July 1 on CTV and July 2 on CTV Two.

The film won two Canadian Screen Awards at the 6th Canadian Screen Awards in 2018, for Best Direction in a Documentary Program (Dolman) and Best Editing in a Documentary Program (Hector).
