= Medicine Walk =

2014 Novel by Richard Wagamese

- First edition book cover
- Author: Richard Wagamese
- Language: English
- Genre: Novel
- Publisher: McClelland & Stewart
- Publication date: 2014
- Publication place: Canada
- Pages: 246 pp
- ISBN: 978-0771089183
- Preceded by: Indian Horse

Medicine Walk is a 2014 novel by Canadian First Nations author Richard Wagamese. The novel relates the journey of 16-year-old Franklin Starlight and his dying, alcoholic father Eldon Starlight to find a burial site for Eldon at a place deep in the forest he remembers fondly from his youth.
