= Adam Garnet Jones =

Canadian filmmaker and screenwriter

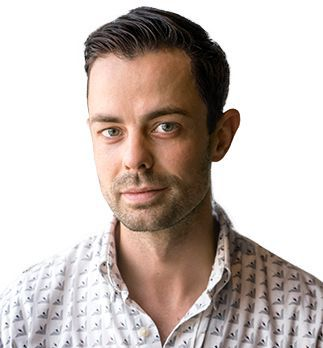
- Born: c.1982/1983
- Education: Toronto Metropolitan University
- Occupations: Film director, screenwriter, author
- Years active: 2006-present
- Television: APTN

Adam Garnet Jones (born c.1982/1983) is a Canadian filmmaker and screenwriter whose works largely focuses on Indigenous peoples in Canada.

Since 2021, Jones has been director of TV content and special events at APTN.

== Early life and education ==
Born in Calgary, Alberta and of Cree, Métis and Danish ancestry, Jones grew up in Edmonton and British Columbia. Jones attended the Gulf Islands Film and Television School, and subsequently moved to Toronto, Ontario to study film at Ryerson University (now Toronto Metropolitan University).

== Career ==
After graduating from Ryerson, his short film Cloudbreaker premiered at the 2006 Toronto International Film Festival, and he coordinated a youth film and video program for Toronto's Inside Out Film and Video Festival. He made the short films A Small Thing, Wave a Red Flag and Liar, wrote an episode of the television series Cashing In, and was a writer and story editor on the television series Mohawk Girls.

His feature film debut, Fire Song, premiered at the 2015 Toronto International Film Festival. Fire Song went on to pick up Audience Choice awards at four film festivals, including the imagineNATIVE Film + Media Arts Festival.

Jones' second film, Great Great Great, premiered at the Canadian Filmmakers' Festival in March 2017, where it won three of the festival's top awards for Best Feature, Best Screenplay and Best Performance. Great Great Great was released theatrically that same year. At the 6th Canadian Screen Awards in 2018, Jones and Sarah Kolasky received a nomination for Best Original Screenplay.

== Author ==
In 2018 he published his first young adult novel, an adaptation of Fire Song. The novel was a finalist for the Burt Award for First Nations, Inuit and Métis Literature. In 2019, the novelization of Fire Song was chosen as the Bronze Medalist for Young Adult Fiction at the Independent Publisher Book Awards.

Published in 2020, the book Love After the End: An Anthology of Two-Spirit and Indigiqueer Speculative Fiction features a short story by Jones titled "History of the New World." The piece dives into the dystopian future of the Earth and how native culture comes into the conversation of how humans should act in the face of global collapse.

== Other works ==
Jones creates beadwork jewelry and runs an Etsy shop selling his work. His pieces have been used in the show Rutherford Falls.

== Awards and nominations ==
- "Canwest Mentorship Award" issued by ImagineNATIVE Film and Media Arts Festival in 2008.
- "Best Short Drama" issued by ImagineNATIVE Film and Media Arts festival for short film A Small Thing in 2008.
- "RBC Emerging Artist Award" issued by Toronto Arts Foundation for short films Cloudbreaker and A Small Thing in 2011.
- "Jim Burt Screenwriting Prize" issued by Writer's Guild of Canada for Wild Medicine in 2013.
- "Air Canada Audience Choice Award" issued by ImagineNATIVE Film and media Arts Festival for Fire Song in 2015.
- "Audience Award - Best Narrative Feature" issued by Reel Out Kingston for Fire Song in 2016.
- "Best Screenplay" issued by Canadian Film Festival for Great, Great, Great in 2017.
- "Best Feature Film" issued by Canadian Film Festival for Great, Great, Great in 2017.
- "Top 10 Canadian films 2017" issued by Globe and Mail for Great, Great, Great in 2017.
