= Bahar Noohian =

Iranian film actress

Bahar Noohian is an Iranian film actress. She is most noted for her performance in the 2017 film Ava, for which she won the Canadian Screen Award for Best Supporting Actress at the 6th Canadian Screen Awards.
