= Ava (2017 Iranian film) =

2017 film

- Film poster
- Directed by: Sadaf Foroughi
- Written by: Sadaf Foroughi
- Produced by: Kiarash Anvari; Sadaf Foroughi
- Starring: Mahour Jabbari
- Cinematography: Sina Kermanizadeh
- Edited by: Kiarash Anvari
- Production company: Sweet Delight Pictures
- Release date: 8 September 2017 (TIFF)
- Running time: 102 minutes
- Countries: Iran; Canada; Qatar
- Language: Persian

Ava (Persian: آوا) is a 2017 internationally co-produced drama film directed and written by Sadaf Foroughi. The Persian-language film screened for the first time in the Discovery section at the 2017 Toronto International Film Festival, where it won the FIPRESCI Discovery Prize and received an Honourable Mention for Best Canadian First Feature Film.

In December, TIFF named the film on its annual Canada's Top Ten list of the ten best Canadian films. The film received eight Canadian Screen Award nominations at the 6th Canadian Screen Awards, including Best Picture, Best Director (Foroughi), Best Actress (Mahour Jabbari) and Best Supporting Actress (Bahar Noohian). It was named as the winner of the Canadian Screen Award for Best First Feature on 31 January 2018.

== Plot ==
Ava is a student at an all-girl Iranian high school. She is an excellent student and a gifted musician. But her mother hears a rumor that Ava has been seen with a boy, she overreacts and humiliates Ava. Her father is more supportive, but he often works out of the city. Her school's headmaster talks a lot about protecting her students, but she is clearly more concerned with the reputation of her school than the best interests of the girls in the school, and on several occasions threatens to expel Ava and other girls, often on the basis of unfounded rumors; she also cajoles students to snitch on each other.

== Cast ==
- Mahour Jabbari as Ava
- Vahid Aghapour as Father
- Parnian Akhtari as Anahita
- Sarah Alimoradi as Shirin
- Mona Ghiasi as Yasi
- Houman Hoursan as Nima
- Bahar Noohian as Mother
- Leili Rashidi as Ms. Dehkhoda
- Shayesteh Sajadi as Melody

== Reception ==
=== Critical reception ===
On review aggregator website Rotten Tomatoes, the film holds an approval rating of 96%, based on 23 reviews, and an average rating of 7.45/10.

=== Accolades ===
Award	Date of ceremony	Category	Recipient(s)	Result	Ref(s)
Asia Pacific Screen Awards	29 November 2018	Best Youth Feature Film	Kiarash Anvari, Sadaf Foroughi	Nominated	
Canadian Screen Awards	11 March 2018	Best Motion Picture	Kiarash Anvari, Sadaf Foroughi	Nominated	
Canadian Screen Awards	11 March 2018	Best Director	Sadaf Foroughi	Nominated	
Canadian Screen Awards	11 March 2018	Best Original Screenplay	Sadaf Foroughi	Nominated	
Canadian Screen Awards	11 March 2018	Best Actress	Mahour Jabbari	Nominated	
Canadian Screen Awards	11 March 2018	Best Supporting Actress	Bahar Noohian	Won	
Canadian Screen Awards	11 March 2018	Best Cinematography	Sina Kermanizadeh	Nominated	
Canadian Screen Awards	11 March 2018	Best Art Direction / Production Design	Siamak Karinejad	Nominated	
Canadian Screen Awards	11 March 2018	Best Editing	Kiarash Anvari	Nominated	
Canadian Screen Awards	11 March 2018	Best First Feature	Sadaf Foroughi	Won	
Directors Guild of Canada	2017	DGC Discovery Award	Sadaf Foroughi	Nominated	
Toronto International Film Festival	7 – 17 September 2017	Best Canadian First Film Honourable Mention	Sadaf Foroughi	Won	
Toronto International Film Festival	7 – 17 September 2017	FIPRESCI Discovery Prize	Sadaf Foroughi	Won	
