= Great Great Great =

- Directed by: Adam Garnet Jones
- Written by: Adam Garnet Jones; Sarah Kolasky
- Produced by: Adam Garnet Jones; Sarah Kolasky
- Starring: Sarah Kolasky; Dan Beirne; Richard Clarkin; Gillian Ferrier
- Cinematography: James Klopko
- Edited by: Michael Pirro
- Music by: David Arcus
- Distributed by: A71 Entertainment
- Release date: 2017
- Running time: 80 minutes
- Country: Canada
- Language: English

Great Great Great is a Canadian drama film, written and directed by Adam Garnet Jones and released in 2017. The film stars Sarah Kolasky as Lauren, a woman who begins having an affair when she decides that her five-year relationship with Tom (Dan Beirne) is unsatisfying and she wants something more.

The film premiered at the Canadian Filmmakers' Festival in 2017, where it won the festival's awards for Best Feature Film, Best Screenplay and Best Performance. It was subsequently picked up for commercial distribution by A71 Entertainment.

At the 6th Canadian Screen Awards in 2018, Jones and Kolasky received a nomination for Best Original Screenplay.

== Cast ==
- Dan Beirne as Tom Anderson
- Richard Clarkin as David Paolini
- Sarah Kolasky as Lauren Frank
