= Hannan Younis =

Canadian actress and comedian

Hannan Younis is a Canadian actress and comedian. She is most noted for her voice performance as Safra in the 2017 animated web series PeopleWatching, for which she was a Canadian Screen Award nominee for Best Actress in a Web Series at the 6th Canadian Screen Awards in 2018.

She has also had a guest role as Ange Werewolf in What We Do in the Shadows, and a recurring role as Emily in Ruby and the Well. In 2021 she appeared in two episodes of Roast Battle Canada, competing against Stacey McGunnigle in the second episode and Keith Pedro in the seventh.

In 2022, she was announced as part of the cast of the comedy series Bria Mack Gets a Life, which premiered in October 2023.

At the 14th Canadian Screen Awards in 2026, she received a nomination for Best Performance in a Live Action Short Drama for her role in the short film Halfway Haunted.
