= PeopleWatching =

Canadian animated web series

- Genre: Animation
- Created by: Winston Rowntree and Geoff Lapaire
- Voices of: Hannan Younis, Bracken Burns, Natalia Bushnik, Jon Blair, Andy Hull, Jonathan Langdon, Ermina Perez, Frederick Gietz, Kate Conway, Chantale Renee, Scott Garland
- Composers: David DeDourek, Brian Rivlin
- Country of origin: Canada
- No. of seasons: 3
- No. of episodes: 28

Production
- Producer: Geoff Lapaire
- Running time: 5–16 minutes
- Production companies: Lapaire Productions and Cutting Class Media

Original release
- Network: CBC Gem
- Release: 2017 – present

PeopleWatching is a Canadian animated web series, which premiered in 2017. Created by Winston Rowntree and Geoff Lapaire, the series follows a group of people in their "20- to 30-somethings" in various scenarios, they deal with the everyday struggles, problems and neuroses that go along with life. The show depicts humorous observations on the absurdities of modern life.

Produced by Geoff Lapaire, Cutting Class Media and Lakeside Animation. The show's voice cast includes Natalia Bushnik, Hannan Younis, Jon Blair, Bracken Burns, Ermina Perez, Frederick Gietz, Kate Conway, Andy Hull, Jonathan Langdon and Chantale Renee. Season 3 (2025) includes the talent of rising actor, Harrison Browne.

The series was distributed in the United States on Cracked.com, and in Canada on CBC Gem.

The series won the Canadian Screen Award for Best Original Digital Program or Series, Fiction at the 6th Canadian Screen Awards in 2018. In the same year, Hannan Younis received a nomination for Best Actress in a Web Program or Series. At the 7th Canadian Screen Awards in 2019, Rowntree was nominated for Best Writing in a Web Program or Series.

== Episodes ==
| Season 1 | Episode Names |
|---|---|
| S1.E1 | Why Speed Dating Is Terrible |
| S1.E2 | Why Non Religious Confessionals Should Be a Thing |
| S1.E3 | Why Dating with Depression Is So (Bleeping) Hard |
| S1.E4 | How Humans Will Eventually Beat Death |
| S1.E5 | How 'Friends' Invented the Friendzone |
| S1.E6 | Why Your Favorite Artist Doesn't Want to Meet You |
| S1.E7 | The One Self Help Group We'd Actually Join |
| S1.E8 | The Importance of Reaching Out to Old Teachers |
| S1.E9 | Watching a Movie at Home Vs the Theaters |
| S1.E10 | Why Nostalgia Is Total Bull |

| Season 2 | Episode Names |
|---|---|
| S2.E1 | 2017 |
| S2.E2 | Hanging Out With My Brother |
| S2.E3 | Homeless People Bother Me |
| S2.E4 | 37 |
| S2.E5 | 20's |
| S2.E6 | Prejudice |
| S2.E7 | The Women Men Don't See |
| S2.E8 | The Museum of Alternate Realities |
| S2.E9 | Love |
| S2.E10 | Hope In Every Box |

| Season 3 | Episode Names |
|---|---|
| S3.E1 | Almost... |
| S3.E2 | Turbodate! |
| S3.E3 | Ask For Janis. |
| S3.E4 | I Hate You. |
| S3.E5 | Us And Them. |
| S3.E6 | Performance. |
| S3.E7 | Dirt. |
| S3.E8 | Together |
