= Summer with Hope =

- Theatrical release poster
- Persian: Tabestan Ba Omid
- Directed by: Sadaf Foroughi
- Written by: Sadaf Foroughi
- Produced by: Sadaf Foroughi; Kiarash Anvari; Christina Piovesan
- Starring: Mehdi Ghorbani; Leili Rashidi; Benyamin Peyrovani; Alireza Kamali
- Cinematography: Amin Jafari
- Edited by: Kiarash Anvari
- Music by: Soheil Peyghambari
- Production companies: First Generation Films; Sweet Delight Pictures
- Release date: July 7, 2022 (KVIFF)
- Running time: 99 minutes
- Countries: Canada; Iran
- Language: Persian

Summer with Hope (Persian: تابستان با امید, romanized: tabastan ba amid) is a 2022 Canadian-Iranian drama film, directed, written and co-produced by Sadaf Foroughi. The film premiered on July 7, 2022 at the Karlovy Vary International Film Festival.

== Premise ==
Omid is a teenaged athlete who is barred from a swimming competition for bureaucratic reasons; however, as his estranged father has made a divorce from his mother (Leili Rashidi) conditional on Omid's performance in the competition, he begins to train in open water under the coaching of Mani (Benyamin Peyrovani). Their increasingly close friendship leads to community rumours and allegations that they are in a gay relationship.

== Release ==
The film premiered on July 7, 2022 at the Karlovy Vary International Film Festival, where it won the Crystal Globe for Best Feature Film.

== Awards ==
The film received three Canadian Screen Award nominations at the 11th Canadian Screen Awards in 2023, for Best Motion Picture, Best Supporting Performance in a Film (Rashidi) and Best Original Screenplay (Foroughi).
