= Halfway Haunted =

2025 Canadian short film directed by Samuel Rudykoff

- Directed by: Samuel Rudykoff
- Written by: Samuel Rudykoff; Bryn Pottie
- Produced by: Samuel Rudykoff; Peter Schnobb; Mark Delottinville
- Starring: Hannan Younis; Kristian Bruun; Sugar Lyn Beard
- Cinematography: Peter Schnobb
- Edited by: John McGovarin
- Music by: Erica Procunier
- Production company: Big Pig Productions
- Release date: August 8, 2025 (HollyShorts)
- Running time: 17 minutes
- Country: Canada
- Language: English

Halfway Haunted is a Canadian short comedy horror film, directed by Samuel Rudykoff and released in 2025.

A satire of the affordable housing crisis in contemporary big cities, the film stars Hannan Younis as Jess, a woman living in a haunted basement apartment as she cannot afford to live anywhere better. When she receives news that the house has been sold to Stephanie (Sugar Lyn Beard), a real estate developer who is giving her two months to move out so that the house can be demolished, Jess teams up with the ghost (Kristian Bruun) to scare Stephanie into backing out of the purchase.

The film premiered at the HollyShorts Film Festival in August 2025.

== Awards ==
Award	Date of ceremony	Category	Recipient	Result	Ref.
Canadian Screen Awards	2026	Best Performance in a Live Action Short Drama	Hannan Younis	Nominated	
