= Duet (2006 film) =

- Directed by: Kiarash Anvari
- Written by: Kiarash Anvari
- Produced by: Kiarash Anvari; Mostafa Anvari; Sadaf Foroughi; Farzaneh Sabetkasaie
- Starring: Kiarash Anvari; Siavash Mazloumipour; Salar Jahangard
- Narrated by: Kiarash Anvari
- Cinematography: Reza Teimouri
- Edited by: Babak Anvari
- Music by: Christophe Rezai
- Production company: Sweet Delight Pictures
- Distributed by: Iranian Independents
- Release date: August 28, 2006 (Palm Springs International Film Festival)
- Running time: 16 minutes
- Language: Persian

Duet is a 2006 Iranian short mockumentary film, shot in Damavand, Iran and written and directed by Kiarash Anvari.

== Plot ==
A retired veteran of the 8-year Iran-Iraq war, paralyzed from injuries suffered in the conflict, struggles to bring peace to the world through a miracle after the attacks on the World Trade Center in September 2001. The ritual he performs depends on the help of his brother, a man who does not believe in miracles.

== Cast ==
- Kiarash Anvari as Narrator
- Siavash Mazloumipour as Paralyzed Soldier
- Salar Jahangard as Brother
- Habib as Afghan kid
- Zahra as Afghan kid

== Festivals ==
The film's has had international screenings at Palm Springs International Short Film Festival (2006), the 13th annual Bite The Mango Film Festival in 2007, the 5th Matsalu Nature Film Festival in 2007, and the 5th Signes de Nuit International Film Festival in Paris in 2007.
