= Indian Horse (film) =

- Theatrical release poster
- Directed by: Stephen Campanelli
- Written by: Dennis Foon
- Based on: Indian Horse by Richard Wagamese
- Produced by: Paula Devonshire; Trish Dolman; Christine Haebler
- Starring: Sladen Peltier; Forrest Goodluck; Ajuawak Kapashesit; Edna Manitowabi; Michael Murphy; Michiel Huisman
- Cinematography: Yves Bélanger
- Edited by: Jamie Alain; Geoff Ashenhurst; Justin Li
- Music by: Jesse Zubot
- Production companies: Devonshire Productions; Screen Siren Pictures
- Distributed by: Elevation Pictures (Canada); Moonrise Pictures (International)
- Release date: September 15, 2017 (TIFF)
- Running time: 100 minutes
- Country: Canada
- Languages: English; Ojibwe
- Budget: $8 million
- Box office: $2 million

Indian Horse is a 2017 Canadian drama film adaptation of the 2012 novel by Ojibwe author Richard Wagamese. Directed by Stephen S. Campanelli and written by Dennis Foon, it premiered at the 2017 Toronto International Film Festival and received a general theatrical release in 2018.

The film centres on Saul Indian Horse, a young Canadian First Nations boy who survives Canada's Indian residential school system to become a star ice hockey player. The film stars Sladen Peltier as Saul at age 6, Forrest Goodluck as Saul at age 15, and Ajuawak Kapashesit as Saul at age 22; along with supporting roles by Edna Manitowabi, Evan Adams, Michiel Huisman, Michael Murphy, and Martin Donovan.

== Plot ==
The Indian Horse family, including six-year-old Saul and his older brother, retreat in canoes deep into the wild to avoid the authorities after Saul's older brother is left seriously ill by his time in an Indian residential school. Saul resolves never to go to a residential school. His parents have converted to Christianity and believe that their eldest son will go to heaven. When the boy dies, they take him away to be blessed by a priest, leaving Saul with his grandmother deep in the woods. The parents do not return.

Saul and his grandmother stay and camp, but once cold weather starts, his grandmother decides they must continue their trek toward their ancestral lands. After their canoe capsizes, they huddle to stay warm at night; they continue their journey on foot through snow. When his grandmother dies, Saul is discovered by the authorities and forcibly taken to a residential school. There, he meets a boy named Lonnie, who can't speak English. The top official, Father Quinney, and his nun deem Lonnie an unsuitable name and call him Aaron. They forbid the boys to speak their Ojibwe language, beating Lonnie because he knows no English.

In the school, Saul witnesses the nuns and priest instructors abuse the children, and struggles to survive. Father Gaston Leboutilier seems to want to change conditions. He convinces Father Quinney to allow a new outdoor activity, ice hockey. Saul does not meet the age requirement to play, but he convinces Father Leboutilier to give him the job of maintaining the rink in the early morning, which allows him to spend time on the ice.

From watching televised hockey games and practicing in the mornings, Saul also begins learning techniques. When one of the school's players is injured, Saul steps forward as a substitute and astounds Father Leboutilier with his talent. Saul declines to join Lonnie's escape attempt, as Saul was looking forward to playing; Lonnie is recaptured and punished.

Saul shows remarkable hockey skills on the school team. When he becomes a teen, the school allows Saul to leave and move into a foster home with an Indigenous family in a mining town, where he can further pursue hockey. Saul joins an all-Indigenous team called the Moose, who travel to games between Indian reserves. He receives the jersey number 13, "for luck". After winning a key game, Saul is treated as a star player in Hockey Night in Canada style, but the team faces racial discrimination and beatings by whites afterwards in a pub.

Saul attracts the attention of the Toronto Monarchs, a feeder team for the Toronto Maple Leafs, but he does not want to leave his friends in the Moose. His team insists he take the offer, and he reluctantly joins the Monarchs. There, he keeps his number 13, which no one else wants due to superstition about the number being unlucky. Initially excelling, he is put off by a racist caricature of him in the newspaper. On the ice, Saul becomes the target of racist slurs from opponents and teammates alike, while the audience throws toy Indian figures onto the ice. He reacts to being fouled several times with violence against other players, and is confined to the penalty box. He is stunned when Father Leboutilier appears one night, professing pride in where hockey has taken Saul, and admitting the abuses in the school were wrong. Father Leboutilier tells Saul that the church is sending him to work in Africa. Leboutilier's appearance causes Saul to have flashbacks to the abuses committed at the school, and he leaves the team.

Taking odd low-level jobs, Saul drifts from place to place between 1979 and 1989. He sees Lonnie in an alley, drinking liquor. Saul also drinks a lot and develops alcoholism. Facing serious health issues after severe damage to his liver, Saul is accepted by the Indigenous rehabilitation centre Rising Dawn. The group therapy leader, seeing how sad and withdrawn Saul is, encourages him to confront the root of his suffering. Saul returns to the now closed school, where it is revealed that he had been sexually molested by Father Leboutilier. He felt betrayed because the priest had also opened hockey to him.

Saul makes a pilgrimage by canoe back to his ancestral lands. After he returns to his foster family, he is happily welcomed by them and his former Moose teammates.

== Cast ==
- Sladen Peltier as Saul Indian Horse (age 12)
- Forrest Goodluck as Saul Indian Horse (age 18)
- Ajuawak Kapashesit as Saul Indian Horse (age 30)
- Ajuawak Kapashesit as Saul Indian Horse (age 44)
- Martin Donovan as Jack Lanahan
- Edna Manitowabi as Naomi, Saul's grandmother
- Michael Lawrenchuk as Fred Kelly
- Will Strongheart as Virgil
- Tristen Marty-Pahtaykan as Buddy Blackwolf
- Vance Banzo as Ernie Jack
- Michael Murphy as Father Quinney
- Michiel Huisman as Father Gaston Leboutilier

== Production ==
The film is an adaptation of the 2012 novel Indian Horse, written by Ojibwa author Richard Wagamese.

Originally slated for production as a television film to air on Super Channel, Indian Horse premiered as a theatrical film after Super Channel filed for bankruptcy in Canada in 2016. The film was shot primarily in Greater Sudbury and Peterborough, Ontario.

Minor controversy arose over the casting of Will Strongheart in the supporting role of Virgil in the film; the actor was known to have a history of criminal domestic violence. Strongheart has attributed his past actions to problems with drugs and alcohol. He said that he regrets such actions, and has reformed since attaining sobriety in 2010.

== Reception ==
Released to average reviews, Indian Horse was a box-office bomb, garnering only $1.69 million on an $8 million budget. Nonetheless, Indian Horse was the highest-grossing English Canadian film of 2018.

Accolades
| Year | Ceremony | Award (Category) | Recipient(s) | Result |
|---|---|---|---|---|
| 2017 | 36th Vancouver International Film Festival | Super Channel People's Choice Award | | Winner |
| 2017 | Cinéfest Sudbury | Best Canadian Film | | Nominated |
| 2017 | Cinéfest Sudbury | Best Feature Film | | Nominated |
| 2017 | Directors Guild of Canada | DGC Discovery Award | Stephen Campanelli | Nominated |
| 2017 | Edmonton International Film Festival | Audience Award (Audience Choice) | | Winner |
| 2017 | Calgary International Film Festival | Audience Award (Best Narrative Feature) | | Winner |
| 2017 | Kamloops Film Festival | Audience Award (Narrative Feature) | | Winner |
| 2017 | Kamloops Film Festival | Most Popular Film (Narrative Feature) | | Winner |
| 2018 | Festival du Film Canadien de Dieppe | Kiwanis Award 2018 | | Winner |
| 2018 | Festival du Film Canadien de Dieppe | Prix du Jury jeunes | | Winner |
| 2018 | Festival du Film Canadien de Dieppe | Prix du public TV5Monde | | Winner |
| 2018 | Directors Guild of Canada | DGC Craft Award (Outstanding Achievement in Production Design – Feature Film) | Oleg M. Savytski | Nominated |
| 2018 | Victoria Film Festival | Audience Favourite Feature (Best Feature Film) | | Winner |
| 2018 | San Diego International Film Festival 2018 | Kumeyaay Eagle Award (Best Native American Film) | | Winner |
| 2018 | 6th Canadian Screen Awards | Best Supporting Actor | Sladen Peltier | Nominated (lost to Ethan Hawke in Maudie) |
| 2018 | Available Light Film Festival | Audience Choice (Best Canadian Fiction) | | Winner |
| 2018 | Leo Awards | Best Visual Effects in a Motion Picture | Erik T. Jensen | Winner |
| 2018 | Leo Awards | Documentary Program or Series: Best Overall Sound | Bill Sheppard and Dean Giammarco (re-recording mixers), Patrick Haskill (sound designer), Gord Hillier (dialogue editor), Maureen Murphy (Foley artist), and Gordon Sproule (mix technician) | Winner |
| 2018 | Leo Awards | Best Sound in a Motion Picture | Patrick Haskill | Winner |
| 2018 | Leo Awards | Best Picture Editing in a Motion Picture | Jamie Alain and Geoff Ashenhurst | Nominated |
| 2018 | Leo Awards | Best Musical Score in a Motion Picture | Jesse Zubot | Nominated |
| 2018 | Leo Awards | Best Screenwriting in a Motion Picture | Dennis Foon | Nominated |
| 2018 | Leo Awards | Best Direction in a Motion Picture | Stephen Campanelli | Nominated |
| 2019 | CAFTCAD Awards | Best Costume Design in Film Period | Aline Gilmore (costume designer), Amanda Lee Street, Zoe Koke, Bonnie Brown, Natalie Ellis, Marcella Lepore, Joanna Syrokomla, Rosie Fex, Alisha Robinson, Valérie Delacroix, Francine Leboeuf, Julie Sauriol, Vanessa Young, and Charlene Chuck Seniuk | Nominated |
| 2020 | SOCAN Awards | Achievement in Feature Film Music | Jesse Zubot | Winner |

=== Critical response ===
On review aggregator Rotten Tomatoes, the film has an approval rating of 79%, based on reviews from 14 critics, with an average rating of 5.90/10.

Boyd van Hoeij of The Hollywood Reporter called it "Important but not very nuanced."

In a review for The Globe and Mail, critic Mark Medley described Indian Horse as a “searing, if heavy-handed” portrayal of the legacy of Canada’s residential school system.

== See also ==
- List of films about ice hockey
