= The Life-Sized City =

Canadian television documentary series

The Life-Sized City is a Canadian television documentary series which premiered on TVOntario in 2017. Hosted by Mikael Colville-Andersen, the series visits various world cities, where it profiles innovative local urban development and improvement projects that are changing and revitalizing city life.

The series received five Canadian Screen Award nominations at the 6th Canadian Screen Awards, and two at the 7th Canadian Screen Awards.

The series has been rebroadcast by Knowledge Network in British Columbia, as well as internationally on Finland's Yle (as Ihmisen Kaupunki), Denmark's DR (as Det fantastiske byliv), Austria's ServusTV, Belgium's VRT, Poland's TVN24, Italy's LaEffe (as Racconti dalle citta del futuro), and France's Planète+ (as Des villes à hauteur d'hommes).

== Episodes ==
Season	Episodes	Originally released	
Season	Episodes	First released	Last released
1	6	September 16, 2017	October 21, 2017
2	6	November 10, 2018	December 15, 2018
3	6	September 8, 2020	October 18, 2020
4	5	May 16, 2023	June 13, 2023

=== Season 1 (2017) ===
No. overall	No. in season	Title	Directed by	Written by	Original release date
1	1	"Medellín"	Michel Lam & Mikael Colville-Andersen	Mikael Colville-Andersen	16 September 2017
A rose among the thorns in South American cities, few places have been as successful as Medellin in tackling social problems head-on with urbanism, architecture and greening of the urban landscape. Colombia's second-largest city has gone from drug-cartel hovel to urbanist dream. The work is nowhere near done but Medellin can inspire every other city in the world with its visionary political and social choice and its strong network of urban activists.
2	2	"Toronto"	Michel Lam & Mikael Colville-Andersen	Mikael Colville-Andersen	September 23, 2017
Mikael Colville-Andersen lands in Toronto to meet the urban heroes working to make Canada's largest city more livable. A prominent cultural and artistic hub and a haven for foodies, Toronto is the big city that doesn't feel impersonal. With 239 neighbourhoods and people coming from all over the world, it's a multi-faceted and profoundly diverse metropolis.
3	3	"Paris"	Michel Lam & Mikael Colville-Andersen	Mikael Colville-Andersen	September 30, 2017
Often perceived as cold and expensive, Paris is a mythical city, one of luxury, gastronomy and haute couture. But beyond the clichés of the Eiffel Tower, there is another Paris - one of solidarity, wittiness, and repurposing public space. This Paris revolves around change, inspiring solutions big and small to improve everyday life for its citizens. It hopes to minimize traffic, give a new life to the banks of the Seine River, and provide adequate lodging and a sense of belonging.
4	4	"Bangkok"	Michel Lam & Mikael Colville-Andersen	Mikael Colville-Andersen	October 7, 2017
A chaotic mix of skyscrapers, street markets and hidden alleyways, Bangkok is a vibrant hub of life, buzzing day and night. Dubbed the Capital of Gridlock, Bangkok boasts traffic that is among the worst in the world. The city's future seems paralyzed by recurring political upheavals, but social instability hasn't undermined the locals' fierce will to better their city. They're fighting back, not with violence but with creativity and ingenuity.
5	5	"Tel Aviv"	Michel Lam & Mikael Colville-Andersen	Mikael Colville-Andersen	October 14, 2017
Few modern cities evoke as much division as Tel Aviv, with its reputation as a laid-back and permissive party town in a hotbed of conflict and turmoil. The problems of a rising cost of living, deficient public transport, and development conflicts are often put aside in the face of cyclical religious and cultural struggles that have marked its complex history. But people from both sides of the political and cultural divide are working together to create a more functional and united city.
6	6	"Tokyo"	Michel Lam & Mikael Colville-Andersen	Mikael Colville-Andersen	October 21, 2017
Modern Tokyo is a fascinating urban mystery. The largest urban agglomeration in the world, it is home to 38 million people - more than the entire population of Canada in one city. On the surface, Tokyo feels like an oversized, human-built environment, full of endless rows of towers, glittering neon and fast-moving citizens. But if you dig deeper, this megacity is much more than its impressive size.

=== Season 2 (2018) ===
No. overall	No. in season	Title	Directed by	Written by	Original release date
7	1	"Cape Town"	Michel Lam & Mikael Colville-Andersen	Mikael Colville-Andersen	November 10, 2018
On the southwest coast of South Africa, Cape Town makes headlines for its laidback lifestyle and natural beauty. But beneath the sales pitch, traces of a dark past still linger. Amid de facto segregation and violence can also be found bold attempts at unity, and a city striving to use urban projects to create democratic inclusivity.
8	2	"Mexico City"	Michel Lam & Mikael Colville-Andersen	Mikael Colville-Andersen	November 17, 2018
Mexico City, the largest city in the Western hemisphere, faces challenges ranging from social and economic inequity to environmental issues to its vulnerability to earthquakes. But many still see this megalopolis as a village - or as a patchwork of many villages, each preserving its own identity, yet home to a unique urban solidarity.
9	3	"Copenhagen"	Michel Lam & Mikael Colville-Andersen	Mikael Colville-Andersen	November 24, 2018
For the past decade, Copenhagen has consistently ranked near the top in dozens of annual global livability surveys. Is Denmark's capital the ultimate life-sized city? Is this model scalable? Urban design expert Mikael Colville-Andersen explores his own city and meets the people working daily to make it live up to its reputation.
10	4	"Milan"	Michel Lam & Mikael Colville-Andersen	Mikael Colville-Andersen	December 1, 2018
Once considered the bland financial capital of Italy, Milan is proving its capacity to redefine itself. An industrial past had left almost indelible scars on the urban fabric. But Expo 2015 sparked change: skyscrapers, new public and private initiatives, and innumerable urban renewal projects have since popped up on every block. Decades of open-mindedness, and of open doors to immigration, have made Milan the most multicultural hub in all of Italy.
11	5	"Detroit/Windsor"	Michel Lam & Mikael Colville-Andersen	Mikael Colville-Andersen	December 8, 2018
The southwestern Ontario city of Windsor has always lived in the shadow of its big American neighbour, Detroit, only 3.6 kilometres away. People cross the border every day for work or leisure. In a matter of decades, Detroit went from one of the most prosperous U.S. cities to one of the most distressed, culminating in the municipality's bankruptcy in 2013. How has this affected Windsor, a city trying to make a name of its own in Canada?
12	6	"Montreal"	Michel Lam & Mikael Colville-Andersen	Mikael Colville-Andersen	December 15, 2018
Although Montreal could be described as half Paris, half Brooklyn - it is after all the most populated francophone city in North America - the city has an identity of its own. Made up of a peculiar mix of creative citizens, cobblestones and potholes, Montreal is not the biggest, nor the richest or boldest. But it's one of the best cities to live in, and it certainly is a happy underdog.

=== Season 3 (2020) ===
No. overall	No. in season	Title	Directed by	Written by	Original release date
13	1	"Buenos Aires"	Michel Lam & Mikael Colville-Andersen	Mikael Colville-Andersen	September 8, 2020
Despite Argentina's history of political and economic upheaval, the nation's capital Buenos Aires has remained relatively stable. But with millions moving to the city for a better life, the cracks in infrastructure and gaping income inequality are now overwhelming. In order to stem the tide, passionate locals have adopted a grassroots approach to tackling challenges big and small in order to ensure quality of life for all.
14	2	"Taipei"	Michel Lam & Mikael Colville-Andersen	Mikael Colville-Andersen	September 15, 2020
The capital of Taiwan is a young city undergoing rapid change and development within a fragile governmental framework. While the island boasts one of the highest economic growth rates in Asia, it maintains a tenuous relationship with China that makes its future uncertain. Fortunately, the citizens of Taipei are loud enough for the entire country, and they will do what it takes to make their voices heard to move forward into a more transparent, greener future.
15	3	"Barcelona"	Michel Lam & Mikael Colville-Andersen	Mikael Colville-Andersen	September 22, 2020
Spain's second-largest city is one of the most popular tourist destinations in Europe, with around 30 million tourists visiting Barcelona each year. Given the city's small population of roughly 1.5 million citizens, however, the impact of tourism is significant and not all positive. Barcelona's rise in popularity has compelled locals to find solutions to reclaim their city and make it more liveable.
16	4	"Beirut"	Michel Lam & Mikael Colville-Andersen	Mikael Colville-Andersen	September 29, 2020
Once considered the Paris of the Middle East, the ancient city of Beirut has survived a brutal civil war, ongoing conflicts with Israel, political assassinations, and endless bombings. Amidst crumbling buildings, a major garbage disposal crisis, and frequent blackouts, Beirutis take everything in stride, because they understand better than most that nothing gets done unless you do it yourself.
17	5	"New Orleans"	Michel Lam & Mikael Colville-Andersen	Mikael Colville-Andersen	October 6, 2020
When Hurricane Katrina ravaged the United States' Gulf Region in 2005, killing over 1800 people, displacing over a million, and causing over 151 billion US dollars in damages, New Orleans was caught in the eye of the storm. The city itself lost nearly half of its population. Fifteen years later, the recovery is ongoing and has taken the form of mass tourism that is pushing out locals. But the city's resilience lies in its strong, multifaceted culture, and in its history of overcoming adversity.
18	6	"Hamilton"	Michel Lam & Mikael Colville-Andersen	Mikael Colville-Andersen	October 18, 2020
Toronto has always cast a long shadow on the city of Hamilton, Ontario, for a number of reasons: it's bigger, it's more economically successful, and people want to live there. But times are changing.

=== Season 4 (2023) ===
No. overall	No. in season	Title	Directed by	Written by	Original release date
19	1	"Los Angeles"	Michel Lam & Mikael Colville-Andersen	Mikael Colville-Andersen	May 16, 2023
Los Angeles is home to over 13 million people who collectively make up one of the most multicultural places in the world. With over 80 neighborhoods making up a rich, diverse hub, LA's polycentrism is certainly its greatest asset. But overcoming the many underlying inequalities is no easy task.
20	2	"Berlin"	Michel Lam & Mikael Colville-Andersen	Mikael Colville-Andersen	May 23, 2023
Germany's capital and largest city, Berlin, is a place of many contradictions. The rise and fall of the Berlin wall had major impacts on the entire world. In 1961, the city was reunited, but decades of isolation left deep-rooted urban and social scars and lasting international repercussions. All of this, however, is the genesis of the city's fascinating urban development.
21	3	"Calgary"	Michel Lam & Mikael Colville-Andersen	Mikael Colville-Andersen	May 30, 2023
Calgary, Canada's oil capital and Alberta's biggest city, is more often associated with the Stampede, cowboys, oil drilling, suburban sprawl and highways. But its economy is now diversifying, and so is the population.
22	4	"Istanbul"	Michel Lam & Mikael Colville-Andersen	Mikael Colville-Andersen	June 6, 2023
The magnificent, multi-layered city of Istanbul has seen its population multiply twelvefold in the past 60 years. This massive, ever-changing metropolis has all the challenges of rapid and uncontrolled urbanization. Yet the streets of this city are home to an estimated 15 million people who strive each day to make it more just, peaceful and liveable.The magnificent, multi-layered city of Istanbul has seen its population multiply twelvefold in the past 60 years. This massive, ever-changing metropolis has all the challenges of rapid and uncontrolled urbanization. Yet the streets of this city are home to an estimated 15 million people who strive each day to make it more just, peaceful and liveable.
23	5	"Antwerp"	Michel Lam & Mikael Colville-Andersen	Mikael Colville-Andersen	June 13, 2023
Although Antwerp was once one of the biggest ports in the world, it no longer has the loud notoriety of some of the world's other cities. This mid-sized walkable and bikeable city boasts beautiful historical architecture, is incredibly diverse, and has an incredible degree of involvement from its citizens.
