= Terror (TV series) =

TV series

Terror is a Viceland documentary series featuring Suroosh Alvi.

The series won the Canadian Screen Award for Best News or Information Series at the 6th Canadian Screen Awards.
