= Carol Hay (producer) =

Canadian executive producer

Carol Hay is a Canadian executive producer. She is a winner of 6th Canadian Screen Awards for the Canadian television drama series Murdoch Mysteries: Once Upon a Murdoch Christmas.
