= Féminin, masculin =

- Directed by: Sadaf Foroughi
- Written by: Kiarash Anvari, Sadaf Foroughi
- Produced by: Brian Tilley
- Cinematography: Mehdi Jafari
- Distributed by: Steps International
- Release date: January 2007 (Clermont-Ferrand Festival)
- Running time: 9 minutes
- Country: Iran
- Language: Persian

Féminin, masculin is a 2007 Iranian documentary film directed by Sadaf Foroughi and co-authored by Foroughi and Kiarash Anvari.

== Synopsis ==
In Iran, there are different sections for men and women on public buses. Women enter buses from the back door, and should sit or stay in a limited zone at the end of the buses which is separated from men's zone. But Farahnaz Shiri, the first female bus driver in Tehran, has made her own little society in her bus. In this bus everything is vice versa. Mrs. Shiri is the governor and the only lawmaker of her own little society. In her bus, men must enter from the backdoor entrance and must sit or stay in the limited zone at the end of the bus.
