= Sina Kermanizadeh =

Iranian cinematographer

Sina Kermanizadeh is an Iranian cinematographer most noted for the 2017 film Ava, nominated for the Canadian Screen Award for Best Cinematography at the 6th Canadian Screen Awards in 2018.

Kermanizadeh's other credits have included the films The Pot and the Oak and Dance with Me.
