= Foreverland (film) =

2011 Canadian drama film

- Film poster
- Directed by: Max McGuire
- Written by: Shawn Riopelle
- Story by: Max McGuire
- Produced by: Trish Dolman; Aaron L. Gilbert; Christine Haebler
- Starring: Max Thieriot; Laurence Leboeuf
- Cinematography: Celiana Cárdenas
- Edited by: Jamie Alain; Brendan Woollard
- Music by: Adam Lastiwka
- Production company: Bron Studios
- Distributed by: Entertainment One
- Release date: December 3, 2011 (Whistler Film Festival)
- Running time: 93 minutes
- Country: Canada
- Language: English

Foreverland is a 2011 Canadian drama film starring Max Thieriot and Laurence Leboeuf.

== Plot ==
At age 21, the world seems to have no limits, the horizon unattainable. We're thinking about the road ahead at the end of college, how to fund that backpacking trip across Europe, or just when we fall madly in love. At 21, Will's mind is elsewhere. He thinks of the two hours of physical therapy he is going to do that afternoon and the half-dozen Creonte-20s he drank with his pancakes in the morning. He is concerned about the chronic obstruction in his bronchial tubes, from the early onset of osteoporosis. He is thinking about what it means to be born with cystic fibrosis, a terminal illness that absorbs youth.

Lonely, sarcastic and always rational, Will resigns himself to his fate. Until one day, lightning strikes from the sky in the form of his old childhood friend Bobby, also suffering from cystic fibrosis and who died of the disease. Bobby asks Will from the afterlife to take his ashes to a legendary sanctuary of healing in Mexico.

Accompanied by Hannah, Bobby's sister, Will embarks on a journey down the Pacific Coast, from Vancouver, along the US coastline into the heart of the Baja Peninsula through California, encountering some difficulties and various characters.

== Cast ==
- Max Thieriot as Will Rankin
- Laurence Leboeuf as Hannah Crane
- Demián Bichir as Salvador
- Matt Frewer as Mr. Steadman
- Sarah Wayne Callies as Fran
- Juliette Lewis as Vicky
- Gary Farmer as Moe
- Míriam Colón as Esperanza
- Thomas Dekker as Bobby

== Reception ==
As of June 2020, the film has a 50% approval rating on Rotten Tomatoes, based on six reviews with an average rating of 5.45/10. James Adams of The Globe and Mail awarded the film one and a half stars out of four.
