= Sladen Peltier =

Canadian actor

Sladen Peltier is a Canadian actor. He is most noted for his performance in the film Indian Horse, for which he was nominated for Best Supporting Actor at the 6th Canadian Screen Awards in 2018.

Peltier currently resides in Ottawa, Ontario and is from Wiikwemkoong First Nation located on Manitoulin Island in Ontario. He was cast in the film, his first ever acting role, after responding to a casting announcement looking for First Nations children who could skate. He has also appeared in supporting parts in the films It Chapter Two and Run Woman Run.{{
