= Mahour Jabbari =

Iranian actress (born 2000)

- ماهور جباری

Mahour Jabbari (Persian: ماهور جباری;born May 10, 2000) is an Iranian actress. She is most noted for her performance in the 2017 film Ava, for which she received a Canadian Screen Award nomination for Best Actress at the 6th Canadian Screen Awards.

Her name was among the best 11 female performances from films released within the first six months of 2018.
