= Daydream Nation (film) =

- Theatrical release poster
- Directed by: Michael Goldbach
- Screenplay by: Michael Goldbach
- Produced by: Christine Haebler; Trish Dolman; Jennifer Weiss; Simone Urdl
- Starring: Kat Dennings; Reece Thompson; Andie MacDowell; Josh Lucas; Rachel Blanchard
- Cinematography: Jon Joffin
- Edited by: Jamie Alain
- Music by: Ohad Benchetrit
- Production companies: Lila 9th Screen Siren; The Film Farm
- Distributed by: eOne Films
- Release dates: September 10, 2010 (TIFF); April 15, 2011 (Canada); May 6, 2011 (United States)
- Running time: 98 minutes
- Country: Canada
- Language: English

Daydream Nation is a 2010 Canadian drama film written and directed by Michael Goldbach. It features Kat Dennings, Reece Thompson, and Josh Lucas. The film premiered at the Toronto International Film Festival on September 10, 2010.

== Plot ==
Seventeen-year-old Caroline Wexler and her father move from a large city to a small town where an industrial fire burns endlessly and many of the students in her new high school seem to be permanently stoned. One of Caroline's classmates, Thurston Goldberg, quickly falls for her after they first meet at a party. Caroline is attracted to her high school English teacher Mr. Anderson and the two begin to have sex.

On Halloween, Thurston and his best friends Paul, Charles and Craig spend most of the day getting stoned and inhaling cleaning products which later causes Craig to have a violent seizure during health class. Afterwards, Mr. Anderson cancels his plans with Caroline in order to help the health teacher Ms. Budge. Mr. Anderson tells Caroline that they should probably go out with other people to avoid looking suspicious, and blows Caroline off on the phone. Feeling upset, Caroline goes out with Thurston where they end up having sex in her car. He admits to her that he was a virgin until that night.

The next day, Mr. Anderson apologizes to her, but says that their relationship must be discreet. They make up and Caroline spends the night after reading Mr. Anderson's draft of his new novel. Thurston continues to try to pursue Caroline, coming to her home with cupcakes. After he is rejected at the door by Caroline's father, Thurston's mother intercedes on his behalf, which leads to her and Caroline's father sharing intimate moments over drinks. Caroline eventually realizes that Mr. Anderson is deeply dysfunctional, and breaks off the relationship in favor of Thurston. In return, Mr. Anderson does everything to sabotage the budding romance, and Caroline's life descends into chaos. Meanwhile, the local TV station, KCRR reports that there is a serial killer who killed a high school cheerleader.

As Caroline and Thurston's relationship develops, Mr. Anderson becomes even more unstable. He tells Thurston that he was just a cover, and on a rampage, Thurston breaks up with Caroline. Caroline leaves and goes to confront Mr. Anderson, who is on the verge of a mental breakdown. After Caroline leaves, he tries to commit suicide but shoots himself in the leg instead. Caroline goes to try to find Thurston and calls him while driving, leaving a message telling him to stay at the Christmas party where she will go to find him and that she loves him.

In the meantime, Thurston goes to the Christmas party and almost has sex with another girl, Jenny who is obsessed with him. Caroline inadvertently crashes her car into the serial killer, who dies from his injuries. She is thought to be a hero and gets back together with Thurston. Ms. Budge shows up at Mr. Anderson's home to tell him the serial killer is dead and takes him to the hospital to treat his injured leg.

== Cast ==
- Kat Dennings as Caroline Wexler
- Reece Thompson as Thurston Goldberg
- Andie MacDowell as Enid Goldberg
- Josh Lucas as Barry Anderson
- Rachel Blanchard as Ms. Budge
- Quinn Lord as Thomas
- Natasha Calis as Lily Goldberg
- Landon Liboiron as Paul
- Katie Boland as Jenny
- Ted Whittall as Mr. Wexler

== Production ==
Principal photography began in Vancouver on January 9, 2010.

== Reception ==
On review aggregator Rotten Tomatoes, the film holds an approval rating of 68% based on 22 reviews, with an average rating of 6.03/10. On Metacritic, the film has a weighted average score of 57 out of 100, based on eight critics, indicating "mixed or average reviews".
