= Sarah Kolasky =

Canadian actress and screenwriter

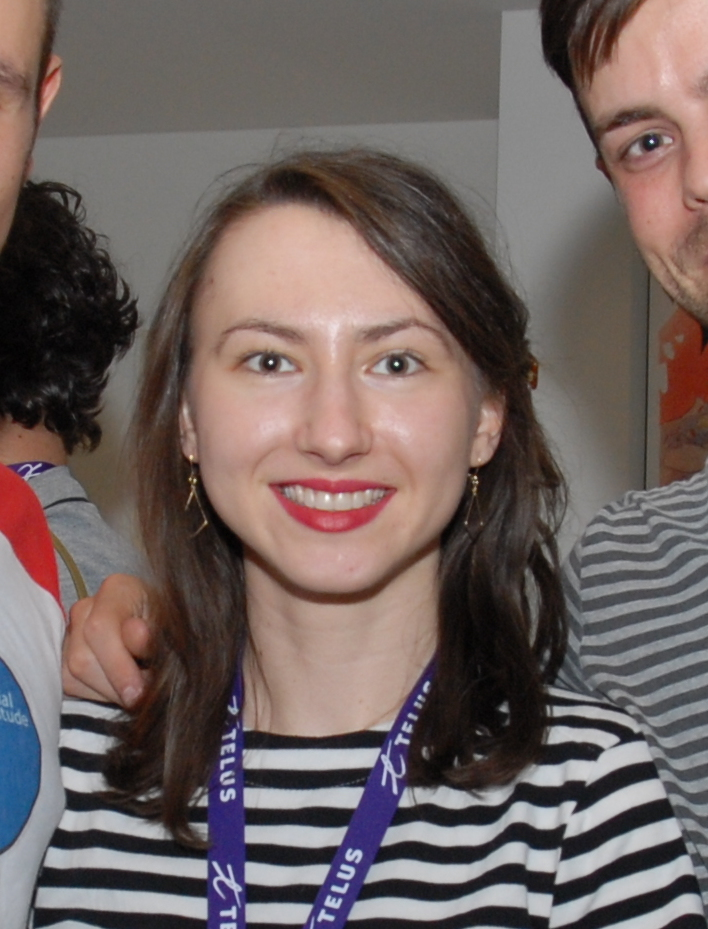
- Sarah Kolasky at a CFC Filmmakers Reception in 2011
- Occupations: actress and screenwriter

Sarah Kolasky is a Canadian actress and screenwriter. She is most noted for the film Great Great Great, which she starred in, coproduced and cowrote with Adam Garnet Jones. Jones and Kolasky received a Canadian Screen Award nomination for Best Original Screenplay at the 6th Canadian Screen Awards.

== Filmography ==
=== Film ===
Year	Title	Role	Notes
2009	Friends with Strangers	Jess	
2009	Moments Before	Jane	
2014	Guidance	Background	
2017	Great Great Great	Lauren Frank	Also writer and producer

=== Television ===
Year	Title	Role	Notes
2011	Wingin' It	Cat A.I.T.	Episode: "All Lizards Go to Heaven: Part 2"
2022	True Dating Stories	Alex	Episode: "Alex"
