= Indian Horse =

2012 novel by Canadian writer Richard Wagamese

- First edition book cover
- Author: Richard Wagamese
- Language: English
- Genre: Drama
- Publisher: Douglas & McIntyre
- Publication date: 2012
- Publication place: Canada
- Media type: Novel
- Pages: 224
- Preceded by: Runaway Dreams
- Followed by: Medicine Walk

Indian Horse (French: Cheval Indien in North America or Jeu blanc in Europe) is a novel by Canadian writer Richard Wagamese, published by Douglas & McIntyre in 2012. The novel centres on Saul Indian Horse, a First Nations boy who survives the residential school system and becomes a talented ice hockey player, only for his past traumas to resurface in his adulthood.

Indian Horse won the 2013 Burt Award for First Nations, Métis and Inuit Literature, and was a competing title in the 2013 edition of Canada Reads. A film adaptation, Indian Horse, was directed by Stephen Campanelli and premiered at the 2017 Toronto International Film Festival.

== Plot ==
In 1961, the Indian Horse family—an Ojibwe family consisting of eight-year-old Saul, his grandmother Naomi, and his Christian parents John and Mary—live in the wilderness of Northern Ontario near Redditt, hiding from the authorities, who previously took Saul's siblings to residential schools. When Saul's brother Benjamin suddenly returns after escaping a residential school, the family moves to Gods Lake, a remote region where their ancestors lived. Benjamin soon dies of tuberculosis, and his parents leave with his body and do not return. That winter, Naomi and Saul try to reach Minaki, but their canoe is overturned, they run out of supplies, and Naomi dies. Saul is found by the authorities and is taken to St. Jerome's Indian Residential School in White River.

At St. Jerome's, headed by Father Quinney and Sister Ignacia, Saul witnesses daily abuse of the children, some of whom die. The same year, Father Gaston Leboutilier joins the faculty and sets up a hockey team for the older boys. Saul, inspired by Hockey Night in Canada, begs to be let on the team despite his age, and is assigned to clean the rink; Saul uses this time to practice hockey, using assorted trash as a puck. When a player is injured during a scrimmage, Father Leboutilier lets Saul substitute and, astounded by his skill, allows him to join the team. Saul becomes St. Jerome's star player and is invited to play for White River's midget hockey team, though he is soon kicked out over his ethnicity.

In 1966, Saul, now thirteen, is invited by Fred Kelly to leave St. Jerome's and live with his Ojibwe family in Manitouwadge to play for the Manitouwadge Moose junior hockey team, coached by Fred and captained by his son Virgil. He quickly gets along with Virgil and the Moose, and leads them to victory against other reserve teams. Saul reunites with Father Leboutilier after a game in Pic River, the last time he ever sees him. After defeating the Kapuskasing Chiefs, a non-Indigenous Northern Hockey Association team, the Moose begin to play against other teams along the Trans-Canada Highway. However, they face heckling and violence over their ethnicity, culminating in an incident near Chapleau, when a group of men beat and urinate on all of the Moose players except Saul, who they spare for his age and skill. At sixteen, Saul is scouted by the Toronto Marlboros, a feeder team for the Toronto Maple Leafs; though he is hesitant, Virgil and the Moose persuade him to join the Marlboros.

In Toronto, Saul attends the Marlboros' training camp and makes the team, but he begins to react violently to the incessant discrimination he faces there, and leaves after being benched indefinitely. Saul returns to Manitouwadge and rejoins the Moose, but his aggressive and violent behavior alienates his teammates. Realizing he is no longer welcome, Saul leaves town once he turns eighteen and becomes an alcoholic hobo. After roaming Canada for several years, in 1978 he briefly lives as a farmhand in Redditt but, feeling empty inside, leaves for Winnipeg, where he has a seizure and is hospitalized. Saul is accepted by the New Dawn Centre, an Indigenous rehabilitation centre, where he meets his counselor, Moses, and has a vivid spiritual experience where he sees his deceased family. In 1986, Saul visits the now-shuttered St. Jerome's, and breaks down in the abandoned hockey rink as he finally acknowledges his trauma: Father Leboutilier routinely molested and raped Saul, who used hockey as a means of escapism. Saul returns to Minaki and takes a boat to Gods Lake, where he has another spiritual experience in which he speaks with his great-grandfather Shabogeesick, the first "Indian Horse".

Saul travels to Manitouwadge, where he reconnects with Fred and his wife Martha, both of whom are residential school survivors who have experienced abuse. He also reconnected with Virgil, who is currently coaching his son Billy's bantam hockey team. Saul considers coaching the bantam team, and Virgil asks him to a reunion hockey game with the Moose. Later that night, while waiting for Virgil and the Moose, Saul discovers a ball of tape on the rink and starts practicing with it, much like he did at St. Jerome's.

== Writing and development ==
Indian Horse is presented as a story within a story, in the form of a memoir written by Saul at the New Dawn Centre, as an alternative to him telling his story to the group there.

According to Wagamese, he originally intended to write a novel solely about hockey, but the legacy of the residential school system gradually became a focal point of the story. He said that writing the book took him about five times longer than it typically would have "because of the emotional territory it covers". Although Wagamese did not attend a residential school, he was affected by that system because his mother, aunts, and uncles were residential school survivors.

== Reception ==
Indian Horse won the 2013 Burt Award for First Nations, Métis and Inuit Literature.

Indian Horse was a competing title in the 2013 edition of Canada Reads. It was advocated by Carol Huynh. It lost to February by Lisa Moore.

In 2020, the novel's French translation (for North America), Cheval Indien, was selected for Le Combat des Livres, the French-language edition of Canada Reads. It was defended by Romeo Saganash.

== Adaptation ==
A film adaptation, Indian Horse, was directed by Stephen Campanelli and premiered at the 2017 Toronto International Film Festival. It then streamed on Netflix. It starred Ajuawak Kapashesit as the adult Saul and has a largely Indigenous cast.
