= John Carlos Frey =

Mexican American Journalist

John Carlos Frey (born November 3, 1969) is a six-time Emmy Award winning documentary filmmaker, investigative journalist and author. John Carlos Frey is currently the host of the podcast entitled The Raid investigating and reporting on the Trump administration's deportation machine. Frey is based in Los Angeles, California.

His investigative work has been featured on programs and networks such as HBO, Netflix, Hulu, NewsHour, 60 Minutes, PBS, ABC News, NBC News, CBS News, CNN, Nightline, Democracy Now!, The Weather Channel, Dan Rather Reports, Fusion TV, Current TV, Univision, and Telemundo. John Carlos Frey has also written articles for the Los Angeles Times, the Huffington Post, Salon, NBC.com, Need to Know online, the Washington Monthly, and El Diario (in Spanish).

Frey's books include the 2019 Sand and Blood: America's Stealth War on the Mexico Border on the Mexico–United States border and actions taken by US law enforcement.

== Personal ==
Frey was born in Tijuana, Mexico. His father was Swiss-American and his mother was a naturalized US citizen of Mexican descent. His family moved to San Diego, California, where he attended parochial schools, and later studied film and graduated from the University of San Diego. Early in his life, Frey sought to hide his Mexican heritage. "I wanted to pass as American, I didn’t want to accept that I was part Mexican," Frey said. "It was really easy to leave my culture behind." Frey's mother was once picked up by US Border Patrol agents and deported because she was unable to convince them of her legal status.

== Acting career ==
Before becoming a documentary filmmaker and journalist, Frey was also an actor for several years. His acting career includes appearances in shows such as The Practice, Days of Our Lives, Married... with Children, JAG, Weird Science, Party of Five, and the film Freaky Friday, among other credits.

== Documentaries ==
Frey's independently produced documentaries include Invisible Mexicans of Deer Canyon, The Invisible Chapel, The 800 Mile Wall, One Border One Body, and Life and Death on the Border.

Frey was the main correspondent for the February 15, 2013, episode of PBS's "Need To Know" titled "Outlawed In Arizona", highlighting a years-long dispute over a Mexican-American studies program in Tucson, Arizona.

== Awards ==
- 2022 Overseas Press Club Award for best international investigation
- 2022 NYC Press Club Award for Best Financial Investigation
- 2022 National Headliner Award - Caffeine Jungle
- 2019 Emmy Award Winner for Best Business Report
- 2019 Edward R. Murrow Award for Overall Excellence
- 2018 Emmy Award Winner for Best Business Report
- 2018 Emmy Award Nomination for Best Investigative Report in a News Magazine
- 2018 Emmy Award Nomination for Best Business Report
- 2018 Edward R. Murrow Award for Best Documentary
- 2018 GLAAD Award Nominee - Best Journalism - News Magazine
- 2017 Emmy Award Winner - Best Investigative Report
- 2017 Society of Professional Journalists - Florida-Best Investigative Reporting
- 2017 Headliner Award for First Place Best Documentary or Series
- 2017 Headliner Award for First Place Best of Show
- 2017 Loeb Award for "The Source"
- 2017 Edward R. Murrow Award for "Aspirist"
- 2017 New York Press Club Documentary Award for "The Source"
- 2017 Society of American Business Writers and Editors Top Prize for "The Source" - Newsroom Category
- 2016 Eppy Award for Best Collaborative Investigative/Enterprise Reporting
- 2016 Emmy Award Recipient for Best Innovative Reporting
- 2016 Society of Professional Journalists Sigma Delta Chi Award for Best Investigative Report in a Magazine
- 2015 Emmy Award Recipient for Best Spanish Language Television Report
- 2015 Investigative Reporters and Editors Medal (IRE Medal) - Best Television Investigation - National
- 2015 New York Press Club - Best TV Documentary
- 2015 Society of Professional Journalists - New America Award
- 2015 Society of Professional Journalists - Sigma Delta Chi Award for Best Documentary
- 2015 Investigative Reporters and Editors (IRE) Medal for Best Investigative Reporting for Television
- 2015 George Polk Award for Best Television Reporting
- 2015 Clarion Award for Television Reporting
- 2015 Editor and Publishers Award "Eppy" for Best Investigative Report
- 2014 Emmy Award Recipient for Best Continuing Coverage of a News Story
- 2014 IF Stone Award (Izzy) for Outstanding Independent Journalism
- 2014 National Headliner Award for PBS "Dying to Get Back"
- 2014 National Headliner Award for Washington Monthly Article, "Crossing the Line"
- 2013 Emmy Award Nomination for Outstanding Investigative Journalism in a News Magazine
- 2013 Emmy Award Nomination for Best Report in a News Magazine
- 2013 Sidney Award] for Socially Conscious Journalism
- 2013 Clarion Award for Best Television Investigative Feature
- 2013 Society of Professional Journalists - Sigma Delta Chi Award for Best Investigative Reporting for Television
- 2012 Scripps Howard Award for Broadcast Journalism
