= Mikael Colville-Andersen =

Canadian-Danish urban designer and urban mobility expert

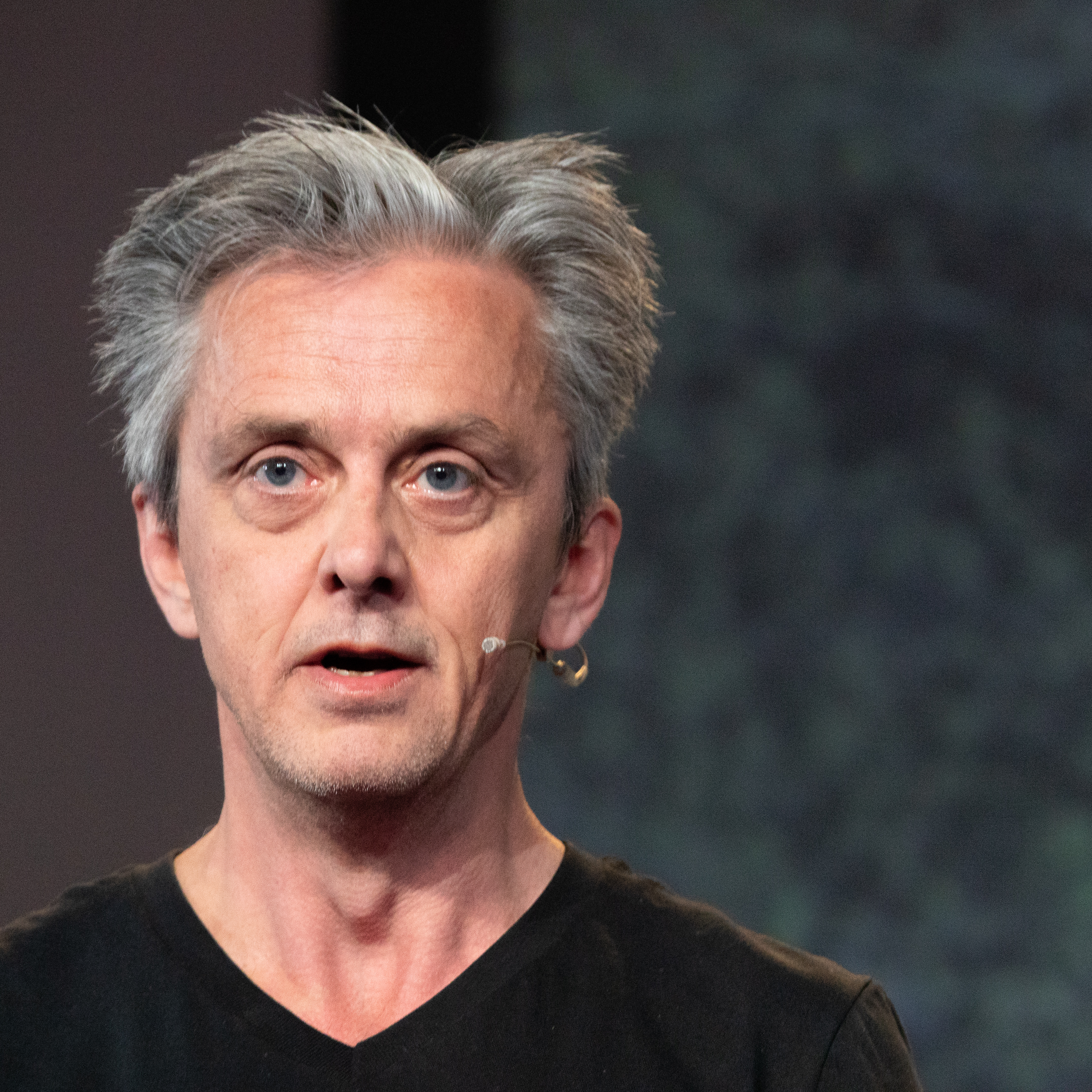
- Colville-Andersen in 2019
- Born: Fort McMurray, Alberta, Canada
- Education: National Film School of Denmark
- Occupations: Urban designer, public speaker, television host
- Notable work: Copenhagenize Design Company; The Life-Sized City (TV)

Mikael Colville-Andersen is a Canadian-Danish urban designer and urban mobility expert. He was the CEO of Copenhagenize Design Company, which he founded in 2009 in Copenhagen, and he works with cities and governments around the world in coaching them towards becoming more bicycle-friendly. He is the host of the urbanism documentary television series The Life-Sized City, which premiered in 2017 on TVOntario and in 2018 on various other international channels including Finland's national broadcaster YLE and Italian broadcaster La Effe. Season 1 of The Life-Sized City was nominated for five Canadian Screen Awards in 2018.

== Career ==
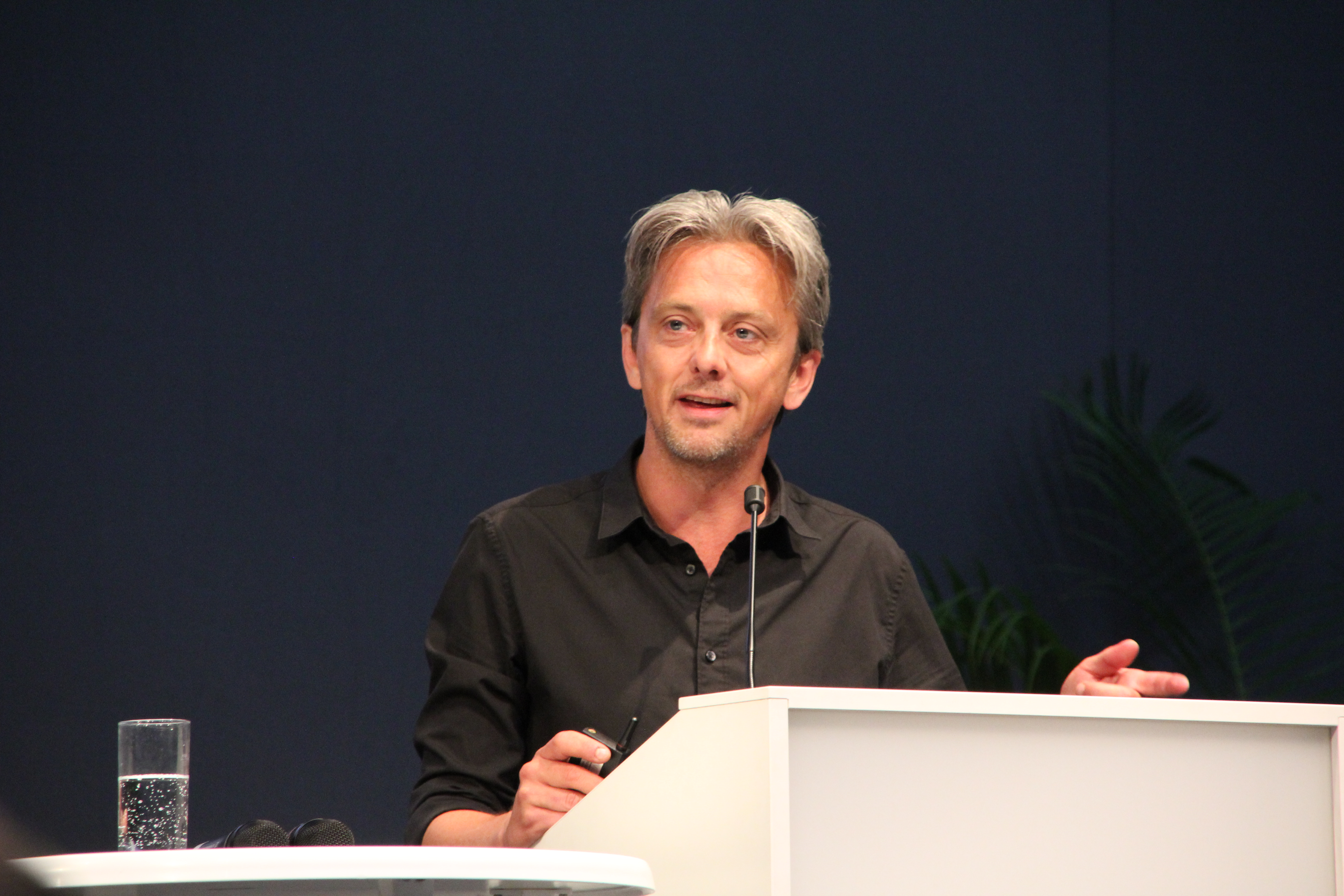
Mikael Colville-Andersen during the ISPO Bike 2013 Conference in Munich

Colville-Andersen is known for his philosophy about simplifying urban planning and urban cycling and how cities should be designed instead of engineered. He is at the forefront of utilising observational techniques inspired by the likes of William H. Whyte for pedestrian and bicycle planning and has been called "the Modern Day Jane Jacobs". He employs anthropology and sociology in his work to develop liveable cities and, in 2012, he spearheaded the largest study of cyclist behaviour ever undertaken – The Choreography of an Urban Intersection – tracking the desire lines of 16,631 cyclists through an intersection in Copenhagen over a 12-hour period.

His approach and philosophy have led to him being referred to as "the Richard Dawkins of cycling" by Peter Walker of The Guardian in 2014 interview with Esquire magazine, "the Pope of urban cycling" by Canadian newspaper La Presse and Austrian newspaper Der Standard, among others and "the Bieber of urban cycling" in an interview with Canadian Broadcasting Corporation.

Colville-Andersen has been instrumental in orchestrating the global bicycle boom, starting with what was later called "the Photo That Launched a Million Bicycles" in 2006, which led to the Copenhagen Cycle Chic photography and streetstyle blog in 2007. Regarding his early work with the Cycle Chic movement, The Guardian dubbed him "The Sartorialist on Two Wheels".

He coined the phrase cycle chic in 2007, as well as the word Copenhagenize in the same year. He has also coined and popularised other phrases such as Bicycle Urbanism, Viking Biking, Citizen Cyclist and he started The Slow Bicycle Movement in 2008.

Before embarking on a career as an urban designer, he was a film director and screenwriter. His debut feature film, Zakka West (2003), was the first indie film in Denmark and premiered at the Copenhagen International Film Festival. He has written and directed several short films, including the award-winning short Breaking Up (1999), and founded the first pan-European organisation for screenwriters – Euroscreenwriters – in 1997.

As producer for The Danish Broadcasting Corporation (DR) bicentenary website for Hans Christian Andersen, he and his team won the Prix Italia award at the Radiotelevisione Italiana 57th Prix Italia for Best Public Service Website.

In 2013, he appeared in Edinburgh to help celebrate that city's Bike Week.

In 2014, he was cited as one of the influential urban planners suggesting that radical solutions were needed if improvement was to be seen in respect to congestion problems in the city of York. He has also explained that cycle parking is needed for cities to be cycle-friendly. He was booked as a keynote speaker at the Velo-city Global conference in Adelaide in May 2014.

== Volunteer work in Ukraine ==
In May 2022, Colville-Andersen founded a non-profit organization Bikes4Ukraine. The organization's first goal was to deliver bicycles to help uncongest Lviv's public transportation. The city had accepted over 200 000 refugees since the start of the 2022 Russian invasion, which put a strain on public transit. Local urban planners contacted Colville-Andersen to suggest the bicycle solution which lead to the founding of the organization. On 3 July 2022, the first bicycle donation event took place in Copenhagen. By the end of that day, the organization received over 100 bicycles, which were sent to 3 Ukrainian cities: Lviv, Bucha and Chernihiv. As of early 2024, Bikes4Ukraine has delivered over 1000 bikes to over 35 cities and towns in Ukraine.

In January 2024, Colville-Andersen announced he is designing a Nordic-style trauma-informed therapy garden for people suffering from PTSD in Kyiv. The project is expected to be finished by June 2024. The initial site for the garden was located in the Podil neighbourhood, however, it was changed to be in the northern part of Kyrylivskyi Hai park, near a psychiatric hospital. Colville-Andersen's team plans to work together with the hospital's staff to create a learning hub for mental health professionals from all over the country. The project in Kyiv is a pilot one, Colville-Andersen has confirmed he and his team have early-stage plans for building more gardens like these in Lviv and Mykolaiv.

== Exhibitions ==
- 2008–2010 Dreams on Wheels, international photo exhibition for The Ministry of Foreign Affairs (Denmark)
- 2011–2013 Monumental Motion – A Cycling Life in the Danish Capital, Global exhibition for Ministry of Foreign Affairs (Denmark)
- 2010–present The Good City – Visions of a City on the Move, Global exhibition with Bicycle Innovation Lab – Consultant/Contributor

== Bibliography ==
- Copenhagenize – the definitive guide to global bicycle urbanism, Island Press Publishing Ltd, 2018, 296 pages. ISBN 978-1610919388.
- Cycle Chic, Thames & Hudson Publishing Ltd, 2012, 288 pages. ISBN 978-0500516102.
- Cargo Bike Nation, Blurb Publishing, 2013, 194 pages. ISBN 978-1320091824.
- Cyclists and Cycling Around the World, Fondo Editorial, Pontifical Catholic University of Peru, 2013, Chapter: Branding Cycling – Mainstreaming A Good thing, 334 pages. ISBN 978-612-4146-55-8
- Backstory 5: Interviews with Screenwriters of the 1990s, University of California Press, 27 October 2009, Chapter: Interview with Jean-Claude Carrière, Editor – Patrick McGilligan, 264 pages, ISBN 978-0520251052

== Awards ==
- 2012 Brazilian Youth Award for the Escolas de Bicicletas – bicycles in schools project in São Paulo, Brazil

== See also ==
- Cycling advocacy
- Bicycle transportation planning and engineering
