= Sadaf Foroughi =

Iranian film director (born 1976)

- صدف فروغی
- Born: July 27, 1976 (age 49); Tehran, Iran
- Occupations: Director; screenwriter; editor; producer; actress
- Years active: 2004–present

Sadaf Foroughi (Persian: صدف فروغی; born July 27, 1976) is an Iranian director, screenwriter, producer and editor. She has a bachelor's degree in French literature. After receiving her master's degree in film studies from University of Provence in Aix-en-Provence, France, she continued her studies toward a PhD in film philosophy. She also completed the New York Film Academy's film-making courses. Her films and video art pieces have been screened in venues and festivals around the world.

== Filmography ==
=== Feature film ===
Year	Title	Director	Screenwriter	Producer	Editor	Notes	Ref(s)
2017	Ava	Yes	Yes	Yes	No	premiered at the 2017 Toronto International Film Festival	
2022	Summer with Hope	Yes	Yes	Yes	No	premiered at the 2022 Karlovy Vary International Film Festival	

=== Short film ===
Director

- 2004: Une Impression, ... aka An Impression (International: English title)
- 2005: Nun, aka Bread (International: English title)
- 2005: Simple Comme Bonjour
- 2007: Féminin, Masculin
- 2007: Sara dar dah daghigh-eh, aka Sara in 10 minutes (International: English title)
- 2007: Les Mains Sales
- 2007: To be or not to be...
- 2009: Shoosh, Lab-e Khat
- 2009: The Kid and the Kite
- 2011: La dernière scène (short)

Editor

- 2005: Nun
- 2005: Simple Comme Bonjour
- 2007: Féminin, Masculin
- 2007: Les Mains Sales
- 2007: Sara dar dah daghigh-eh
- 2009: Shoosh, Lab-e Khat (Co-edited with Kiarash Anvari)
- 2009: The Kid and the Kite (Co-edited with Kiarash Anvari)

Producer

- 2004: Une Impression
- 2005: Nun
- 2005: Simple Comme Bonjour
- 2006: Duet (co-producer)
- 2007: Sara dar dah daghigh-eh
- 2009: Shoosh, Lab-e Khat
- 2009: The Kid and the Kite

Screenwriter

- 2004: Une Impression
- 2005: Nun
- 2005: Simple Comme Bonjour
- 2007: Féminin, Masculin
- 2007: Les Mains Sales
- 2007: Sara dar dah daghigh-eh
- 2007: To be or not to be...
- 2009: Shoosh, Lab-e Khat (Co-written with Kiarash Anvari)
- 2009: The Kid and the Kite (Story)
- 2011: La dernière scène (short)

Actor

- 2004: An Abstract Expression
