= Kiarash Anvari =

Iranian film director

Kiarash Anvari (Persian: کيارش انوری; born 16 November 1977 in Tehran, Iran) is an Iranian film director, video artist, and scriptwriter.

Anvari received his B.A. degree in film making from Sooreh Higher Education Institute in Tehran. After receiving his master's degree in film studies from the University of Provence in Aix-en-Provence, France, he continued his studies on a Ph.D. in film philosophy. He co-founded the production company Sweet Delight Pictures. He was the producer and editor of Summer With Hope, which won the Crystal Globe Grand Prix for Best Film at the 2022 Karlovy Vary International Film Festival.

== Filmography ==
=== Director ===
- 2017: The Pot and The Oak.
- 2006: Duet (2006 film).
- 2004: An Abstract Expression.
- 2003: Rapid Eye Movement.
- 2003: Dirooz, Dirooz Panzdah Daghigh-eh Ghabl.

... a.k.a. Yesterday, yesterday 15 minutes earlier (International: English title).

- 2002: Man pak konande-h hastam!

... a.k.a. I am a Purifier! (International: English title).

- 2000: ...Va man dar khoshbakhti-e shirin be donya amadam!

... a.k.a. ...And I was born to sweet delight!(International: English title).

- 1998: Switch (two minutes of a miserable life!).

=== Producer ===
- 2022: Summer with Hope
- 2017: AVA.
- 2009: The Kid and the Kite (co-producer).
- 2009: Shoosh, Lab-e Khat (co-producer).
- 2006: Duet (2006 film).
- 2004: An Abstract Expression.
- 2003: Rapid Eye Movement.
- 2003: Dirooz, Dirooz Panzdah Daghigh-eh Ghabl.

... a.k.a. Yesterday, yesterday 15 minutes earlier (International: English title).

- 2002: Man pak konande-h hastam!

... a.k.a. I am a Purifier! (International: English title).

=== Writer ===
- 2009: The Kid and the Kite.
- 2009: Shoosh, Lab-e Khat (co-written with Sadaf Foroughi).
- 2007: Féminin, Masculin (co-written with Sadaf Foroughi).
- 2006: Duet (2006 film).
- 2004: An Abstract Expression.
- 2003: Rapid Eye Movement.
- 2003: Dirooz, Dirooz Panzdah Daghigh-eh Ghabl.

... a.k.a. Yesterday, yesterday 15 minutes earlier (International: English title).

- 2002: Man pak konande-h hastam!

... a.k.a. I am a Purifier! (International: English title).

- 2000: ...Va man dar khoshbakhti-e shirin be donya amadam!

... a.k.a. ...And I was born to sweet delight! (International: English title).
