= List of Canadian films of 2016 =

This is a list of Canadian films released in 2016:

Title	Director	Cast	Genre	Notes	Ref
The 3 L'il Pigs 2 (Les 3 p'tits cochons 2)	Jean-François Pouliot	Paul Doucet, Guillaume Lemay-Thivierge, Patrice Robitaille	Dramedy	Golden Screen Award winner as top-grossing Canadian film of 2016	
9 (9, le film)	Claude Brie, Érik Canuel, Jean-Philippe Duval, Marc Labrèche, Micheline Lanctôt, Luc Picard, Stéphane E. Roy, Éric Tessier, Ricardo Trogi	Stéphane E. Roy, Marc Labrèche, François Papineau, Anne-Marie Cadieux	Drama	An adaptation of Stéphane E. Roy's play 9 Variations on the Void	
The Adventure Club	Geoff Anderson	Sam Ashe Arnold, Jakob Davies, Dalila Bela, Billy Zane	Children's fantasy		
All Governments Lie: Truth, Deception and the Spirit of I. F. Stone	Fred Peabody	Featuring I.F. Stone, Carl Bernstein, Noam Chomsky among others	Documentary		
An American Dream: The Education of William Bowman	Ken Finkleman		Comedy		
Anatomy of Violence	Deepa Mehta	Vansh Bhardwaj, Suman jha, Tia Bhatia, Janki Bisht, Seema Biswas	Drama		
Antibirth	Danny Perez	Chloë Sevigny, Natasha Lyonne, Meg Tilly	Horror, thriller		
Angry Inuk	Alethea Arnaquq-Baril	Aaju Peter	Documentary		
ARQ	Tony Elliott	Robbie Amell, Rachael Taylor, Shaun Benson	Science fiction	Made with U.S. financing	
Bad Seeds (Les Mauvaises herbes)	Louis Bélanger	Alexis Martin, Gilles Renaud, Emmanuelle Lussier-Martinez	Drama		
The Barber of Augusta	Michèle Hozer		Documentary		
Before the Streets (Avant les rues)	Chloé Leriche	Rykko Bellemare, Kwena Bellemare-Boivin, Jacques Newashish	Drama		
Below Her Mouth	April Mullen	Natalie Krill, Erika Linder	Drama		
Black Code	Nicholas de Pencier	Featuring Felipe Altenfeldor, Ronald Deibert, Wjd Dhnie	Documentary	Examines the global impact that the Internet has had on matters of free speech, privacy and activism.	
Blind Vaysha	Theodore Ushev	Based on a story by Georgi Gospodinov	National Film Board of Canada animated short	nominated for Academy Award for Best Animated Short Film; Canadian Screen Award winner for Animated Short	
Boris Without Béatrice	Denis Côté	James Hyndman, Simone-Élise Girard, Denis Lavant	Drama		
The Botanist	Maude Plante-Husaruk, Maxime Lacoste-Lebuis		Documentary		
Boundaries (Pays)	Chloé Robichaud	Emily VanCamp, Macha Grenon, Serge Houde, Rémy Girard	Drama		
Callshop Istanbul	Hind Benchekroun, Sami Mermer		Documentary		
Coffee at Laundromat	Maahi Kaur	Ali Kazmi	Dramedy short		
Colonization Road	Michelle St. John	Ryan McMahon	Documentary		
The Cyclotron (Le Cyclotron)	Olivier Asselin	Lucille Fluet, Paul Ahmarani, Mark Antony Krupa	Drama		
A Date with Miss Fortune	John L'Ecuyer	Jeannette Sousa, Ryan Scott, Joaquim de Almeida	Romantic comedy		
Dead Leaves (Feuilles mortes)	Thierry Bouffard, Carnior, Édouard Albernhe Tremblay	Roy Dupuis, Noémie O'Farrell, Audrey Rancourt-Lessard	Futuristic western	Winner of the Best Canadian Feature at the 2016 Fantasia Film Festival	
Desert City (Déserts)	Charles-André Coderre, Yann-Manuel Hernandez	Hubert Proulx, Victoria Diamond, Elisabeth Locasi	Drama		
Emma	Martin Edralin	Hailey Kittle, Mandy May Cheetham, Justin LeRoy, Goldbloom Micomonaco, Madeleine Sims-Fewer	Short drama		
Faceless	Ali Akbar Kamal	Humayoon Shams Khan, Rahmatullah Khostai, Farahnaz Nawabi	Action		
Faggot (Tapette)	Olivier Perrier	Robin L'Houmeau, Eliot Nault	Short drama		
Fluffy	Lee Filipovski		Short drama		
Frame 394	Rich Williamson	Daniel Voshart	Documentary		
A Funeral for Lightning	Emily Kai Bock	Annie Williams, Daniel Frazier	Short drama		
Giants of Africa	Hubert Davis	Masai Ujiri	Documentary		
The Grasslands Project	Scott Parker		National Film Board of Canada short documentary films		
Gulîstan, Land of Roses	Zaynê Akyol		Documentary	National Film Board of Canada-Germany co-production	
Gun Runners	Anjali Nayar	Julius Arile, Robert Matanda	National Film Board of Canada documentary		
Harry: Portrait of a Private Detective (Harry: Portrait d’un détective privé)	Maxime Desruisseaux	Nick Theodorakis, Denis Marchand, Michel-Vital Blanchard	Crime drama		
Her Friend Adam	Ben Petrie	Ben Petrie, Grace Glowicki, Andrew Chown	Short drama		
Hello Destroyer	Kevan Funk	Jared Abrahamson, Kurt Max Runte	Drama		
Hunting Pignut	Martine Blue	Taylor Hickson, Joel Thomas Hynes	Drama		
I Am Here	Eoin Duffy		National Film Board of Canada animated short		
I Like Girls (J'aime les filles)	Diane Obomsawin		National Film Board of Canada animated short		
Iqaluit	Benoît Pilon	Marie-Josée Croze, Natar Ungalaaq	Drama		
It's Only the End of the World (Juste la fin du monde)	Xavier Dolan	Gaspard Ulliel, Nathalie Baye, Marion Cotillard	Drama	Cannes Grand Prix winner; Canadian Screen Award winner for Best Picture	
Jean of the Joneses	Stella Meghie	Taylour Paige, Sherri Shepherd	Comedy	Made with U.S. financing	
A Kid (Le Fils de Jean)	Philippe Lioret	Pierre Deladonchamps, Gabriel Arcand, Catherine De Léan	Drama	French coproduction	
Kidnap Capital	Felipe Rodriguez	Paulino Nunes, Jonathan Souza, Michael Reventar, Michelle Arvizu, Pedro Miguel Arce	Crime drama		
King Dave	Daniel Grou	Alexandre Goyette, Mylène St-Sauveur, Moe Jeudy-Lamour, Karelle Tremblay	Drama	Shot in one continuous take; adapted from Goyette's stage play.	
Kiss Me Like a Lover (Embrasse-moi comme tu m’aimes)	André Forcier	Émile Schneider, Juliette Gosselin, Céline Bonnier	Dramedy		
Koneline: Our Land Beautiful	Nettie Wild		Documentary		
Limit Is the Sky	Julia Ivanova		Documentary		
The Lockpicker	Randall Okita	Keigian Umi Tang	Crime drama		
Lovesick	Tyson Caron	Jacob Tierney, Jessica Paré, Jay Baruchel	Romantic comedy		
Mariner	Thyrone Tommy	Thomas Olajide	Short drama		
Maudie	Aisling Walsh	Ethan Hawke, Sally Hawkins, Kari Matchett	Drama	Canada-Ireland coproduction	
Mean Dreams	Nathan Morlando	Sophie Nélisse, Josh Wiggins, Bill Paxton, Colm Feore	Drama		
Migrant Dreams	Min Sook Lee		Documentary		
Miss Peregrine's Home for Peculiar Children	Tim Burton	Eva Green, Asa Butterfield, Chris O'Dowd, Allison Janney, Rupert Everett, Terence Stamp, Ella Purnell, Judi Dench, Samuel L. Jackson	Fantasy	Co-production with the US, the UK and Belgium	
Montreal, White City (Montréal la blanche)	Bachir Bensaddek	Karina Aktouf, Rabah Aït Ouyahia	Drama		
Mostly Sunny	Dilip Mehta	Sunny Leone	Documentary		
Mutants	Alexandre Dostie	Joseph DeLorey, Francis La Haye, Sandrine Bisson	Dramatic short		
My Friend Dino (Mon ami Dino)	Jimmy Larouche	Michel Côté, Sasha Migliarese, Joëlle Morin, Dino Tavarone	Crime drama		
Nelly	Anne Émond	Mylène Mackay	Drama		
Never Eat Alone	Sofia Bohdanowicz	Deragh Campbell, Joan Benac	Drama		
The New Life of Paul Sneijder (La nouvelle vie de Paul Sneijder)	Thomas Vincent	Thierry Lhermitte, Géraldine Pailhas, Pierre Curzi	Drama	Canada-France coproduction	
Nitro Rush	Alain DesRochers	Guillaume Lemay-Thivierge, Raymond Bouchard, Antoine Desrochers	Crime/action drama		
Northlander	Benjamin Ross Hayden	Corey Sevier, Roseanne Supernault, Michelle Thrush	Futuristic drama		
Of Ink and Blood (D’encre et de sang)	Francis Fortin, Alexis Fortier Gauthier, Maxim Rheault	Jocelyn Blanchard, Véronique Chaumont, Nathalie Coupal	Drama		
Oh What a Wonderful Feeling	François Jaros	Ellen David, Louis Negin, Karelle Tremblay	Experimental drama		
Old Stone	Johnny Ma	Chen Gang	Drama	Toronto International Film Festival Award for Best Canadian First Feature Film winner; a Canada-China co-production	
Operation Avalanche	Matt Johnson	Matt Johnson, Owen Williams, Josh Boles	Conspiracy thriller	Faux documentary	
The Other Half	Joey Klein	Tatiana Maslany, Tom Cullen, Henry Czerny	Drama	Canadian Screen Awards Performance by an Actress in a Leading Role (Tatiana Maslany)	
The Other Side of November (L'Autre côté de novembre)	Maryanne Zéhil	Arsinée Khanjian, Pascale Bussières, Marc Labrèche	Drama		
Le Pacte des anges	Richard Angers	Lenni-Kim, Marc Messier, Émile Schneider	Crime drama		
Perfect (Parfaites)	Jérémie Battaglia		Documentary		
Plain and Simple (Tout simplement)	Raphaël Ouellet		Short drama		
Prank	Vincent Biron	Étienne Galloy, Alexandre Lavigne, Constance Massicotte	Comedy		
The Prison in Twelve Landscapes	Brett Story		Documentary		
Pyotr495	Blake Mawson	Alex Ozerov	Horror short		
Queer Hutterite	Laura O'Grady	Kelly Hofer	Documentary short		
Race	Stephen Hopkins	Stephan James, Jason Sudeikis, Jeremy Irons	Drama	Canada-France-Germany co-production	
Red of the Yew Tree (If ou le rouge perdu)	Marie-Hélène Turcotte		Animated short		
The River of My Dreams	Brigitte Berman	Gordon Pinsent	Documentary		
Riverhead	Justin Oakey	Lawrence Barry, Evan Mercer	Drama		
The Road to Webequie	Tess Girard, Ryan Noth		Documentary		
Sadie's Last Days on Earth	Michael Seater	Morgan Taylor Campbell, Ricardo Hoyos, Paula Brancati, Hélène Joy, Peter Keleghan	Comedy		
Searchers (Maliglutit)	Zacharias Kunuk, Natar Ungalaaq	Benjamin Kunuk, Jocelyne Immaroitok, Karen Ivalu	Drama		
Shambles (Maudite poutine)	Karl Lemieux	Jean-Simon Leduc, Martin Dubreuil	Drama		
The Skyjacker's Tale	Jamie Kastner	Ishmael Muslim Ali	Documentary		
Sled Dogs	Fern Levitt		Documentary		
Snip	Terril Calder		Animated short		
The Space Between	Amy Jo Johnson	Amy Jo Johnson, Jayne Eastwood, Michael Ironside	Drama		
Spark	Aaron Woodley	Voices include Jace Norman, Jessica Biel, Hilary Swank, Susan Sarandon	Animated feature	Canada-South Korea co-production made with U.S. financing	
Special Correspondents	Ricky Gervais	Eric Bana, Ricky Gervais, Vera Farmiga	Comedy	Canada-U.K. co-production made with U.S. financing	
Spirit Unforgettable	Pete McCormack	Spirit of the West	Documentary		
Split (Écartée)	Lawrence Côté-Collins	Marjolaine Beauchamp, Ronald Cyr, Whitney Lafleur	Docufiction		
The Squealing Game (La Chasse au Collet)	Steve Kerr	Paul Doucet, Julianne Côté, Anne-Marie Cadieux	Drama		
Still Night, Still Light (Mes nuits feront écho)	Sophie Goyette				
Stone Makers (Carrière)	Jean-Marc E. Roy		Documentary		
The Sun at Midnight	Kirsten Carthew	Duane Howard, Kawennáhere Devery Jacobs	Drama		
Tales of Two Who Dreamt (Historias de dos que soñaron)	Nicolás Pereda, Andrea Bussmann		Documentary		
Theater of Life	Peter Svatek		Documentary produced with the National Film Board of Canada		
This River	Katherena Vermette, Erika MacPherson	Kyle Kematch	National Film Board of Canada documentary short		
This Time Tomorrow (Mañana a esta hora)	Lina Rodríguez	Laura Osma, Maruia Shelton, Francisco Zaldua	Drama	Colombia-Canadian coproduction	
Those Who Make Revolution Halfway Only Dig Their Own Graves (Ceux qui font les révolutions à moitié n'ont fait que se creuser un tombeau)	Mathieu Denis, Simon Lavoie	Charlotte Aubin, Laurent Bélanger, Gabrielle Tremblay, Emmanuelle Lussier-Martinez	Drama	Toronto International Film Festival Award for Best Canadian Film winner	
Total Frat Movie	Warren P. Sonoda	Justin Deeley, Alex House, Tom Green	Comedy		
Two Lovers and a Bear	Kim Nguyen	Dane DeHaan, Tatiana Maslany, Gordon Pinsent	Drama		
Two Soft Things, Two Hard Things	Mark Kenneth Woods, Michael Yerxa		Documentary		
Tuktuq	Robin Aubert	Robin Aubert, Brigitte Poupart	Docufiction		
Unless	Alan Gilsenan	Catherine Keener, Hannah Gross, Brendan Coyle, Matt Craven, Chloe Rose, Hanna Schygulla	Drama based on the novel of the same name by Carol Shields	Canada-Ireland co-production	
The Unseen	Geoff Redknap	Aden Young, Camille Sullivan, Julia Sarah Stone, Ben Cotton	Psychological horror		
The Void	Steven Kostanski, Jeremy Gillespie	Ellen Wong, Aaron Poole, Evan Stern	Horror	Canada-U.K. co-production made with U.S. financing	
Vortex	Jephté Bastien	Marie-Ange Barbancourt, Carmen Bastida, Alain Bastien	Occult drama	Canada-China-Hiati co-production	
Votez Bougon	Jean-François Pouliot	Rémy Girard, Louison Danis, Hélène Bourgeois Leclerc	Comedy		
Wait Till Helen Comes	Dominic James	Sophie Nélisse, Isabelle Nélisse, Maria Bello, Callum Keith Rennie	Thriller		
Waseskun	Steve Patry		National Film Board of Canada documentary		
We Can't Make the Same Mistake Twice	Alanis Obomsawin		National Film Board of Canada documentary	Obomsawin's 49th film	
We're Still Together	Jesse Noah Klein	Joey Klein, Jesse Camacho	Drama		
Weirdos	Bruce McDonald	Dylan Authors, Julia Sarah Stone, Allan Hawco, Cathy Jones, Molly Parker	Drama		
Werewolf	Ashley McKenzie	Andrew Gillis, Bhreagh MacNeil	Drama		
Wexford Plaza	Joyce Wong	Reid Asselstine, Darrel Gamotin	Comedy-drama		
Wild Run: The Legend (Chasse-Galerie: La Légende)	Jean-Philippe Duval	Caroline Dhavernas, Francis Ducharme. François Papineau, Vincent-Guillaume Otis	Historical drama		
Wild Skin (La Peau sauvage)	Ariane Louis-Seize	Marilyn Castonguay	Short drama		
Window Horses	Ann Marie Fleming	Voices include Sandra Oh, Nancy Kwan, Shohreh Aghdashloo	Animated feature produced with the National Film Board of Canada		
X500	Juan Andrés Arango	Jembie Almazan, Bernardo Garnica Cruz, Jonathan Diaz Angulo	Drama	Canada-Mexico-Columbia co-production	

== See also ==
- 2016 in Canada
- 2016 in Canadian television
