= Mark Camacho =

Canadian actor

- Education: Champlain College; Concordia University
- Occupations: Actor; director; writer
- Years active: 1989–present
- Spouse: Pauline Little (m. 1988)
- Children: 2, including Jesse Camacho

Mark Camacho is a Canadian character actor.

== Career ==
He has starred in live-action films, but is best known for his voice acting roles, such as Oliver Frensky in Arthur, Lyle in Animal Crackers, Dad in Rotten Ralph, George Martin in Spaced Out, Harry and Dragon in Potatoes and Dragons, Jerry Atric in Samurai Pizza Cats, Gantlos in the English-language version of Winx Club, Zob in Monster Allergy, Conrad Cupmann in the Amazon Jack films and Zösky in Kaput & Zösky. He also voiced the character of Jeri Skalnic in Still Life.

In the 2007 Bob Dylan biopic I'm Not There, Camacho plays the part of Norman, based upon Dylan's manager Albert Grossman. He was later cast in Punisher: War Zone as one of Jigsaw's surviving men.

He is married to actress Pauline Little. Their son, Jesse Camacho, is also an actor, best known for the television series Less Than Kind.

== Filmography ==
=== Film ===
- People and Science: Good Logging Is No Crime (1989, Short) as Narrator
- The Amityville Curse (1990) as Krabel
- Whispers (1990) as Morgue Assistant
- Scanners II: The New Order (1991) as Paramedic
- Snake Eater III: His Law (1991) as Scanning Customer
- Canvas (1992) as Mario
- Deadbolt (1992, TV Movie) as Phil
- The Myth of the Male Orgasm (1993) as Tim
- The Neighbor (1993) as Bank manager
- Mrs. Parker and the Vicious Circle (1994) as Writer #1
- Stalked (1994) as Lawyer
- Dr. Jekyll and Ms. Hyde (1995) as Waiter
- Rainbow (1995) as Fotoshop Assistant
- Hollow Point (1996) as Police Officer at Diner
- Marked Man (1996) as Drunk Driver
- Rowing Through (1996) as Reporter #1
- Poverty and Other Delights (1996) (Joyeux Calvaire) as Le gardien de la gare
- Afterglow (1996) as Ritz-Carlton Bartender
- The Peacekeeper (1997) as Presidential Aide #1
- Affliction (1997) as Clyde
- The Kid (1997) as Dan Albright
- For Hire (1998) as Detective Lawlor
- The Sleep Room (1998) as Department Store Guard
- Little Men (1998) as Police Sergeant
- Snake Eyes (1998) as C.J.
- Going to Kansas City (1998) as Billy Ossining
- Random Encounter (1998) as Mark Brewster
- Out of Control (1998) as Nick
- Sublet (1998) as FBI Agent Dobson
- Fatal Affair (1998) as Walt Rosenbaum
- Babel (1999) as Bexter
- Perpetrators of the Crime (1999) as Leroy
- Dead Silent (1999) as Lt. Sam Waterton
- The Whole Nine Yards (2000) as Interrogator #1
- Fire and Ice: The Rocket Richard Riot (2000, Documentary) as Linesman
- Nowhere in Sight (2001) as Marc Cory
- The Score (2001) as Sapperstein's Cousin
- Heist (2001) as Jewelry Store Guard
- Protection (2001) as Peter
- Dead Awake (2001) as Window Washer
- Abandon (2002) as Detective Rigney
- The Adventures of Pluto Nash (2002) as Robot Holding Cell Clark
- Tunnel (2002) as John
- Twin Sisters (2002) as Cop Outside Hotel
- Mambo Italiano (2003) as Johnny Christofaro
- Shattered Glass (2003) as Glass' Lawyer
- Jericho Mansions (2003) as Gilbert
- Wicker Park (2004) as Bartender
- The Ecstasy Note (2006, Short) as Henford Phelps
- Let Them Eat (2006) as Sanson the Executioner / Doc
- The Myth of the Male Orgasm (2007) as Tim
- I'm Not There (2007) as Norman
- Afterwards (2008) as Lawyer
- Punisher: War Zone (2008) as Pittsy
- Dead Like Me: Life After Death (2009) as Stage Manager
- Barney's Version (2010) as Mark
- The Words (2010) as Fan
- Brick Mansions (2014) as Businessman Type
- X-Men: Days of Future Past (2014) as Richard Nixon
- Stonewall (2015) as Fat Tony
- The Walk (2015) as Guy Tozzoli
- We're Still Together (2016) as Cop
- Nine Lives (2016) as Josh Boone
- Arrival (2016) as Richard Riley (Radio Talk Show Host)
- Good Sam (2019) as David Dyal
- Most Wanted (2020) as Moore
- Felix and the Treasure of Morgäa (Félix et le trésor de Morgäa) – 2021
- Peace by Chocolate (2021) as Frank Gallant
- Katak: The Brave Beluga (2023) as Paparazzi
- Lydia and the Mist Rider (2023) as cheese seller

=== Television ===
- Are You Afraid of the Dark? (1992–1993) as Leonard Buckley / Delivery Workman
- Sirens (1994) as Myron Perryman / Defense Lawyer
- Hiroshima (1995, TV Movie) as Charles Sweeney (Pilot)
- Space Cases (1996) as Warden Opus
- Pretty Poison (1996, TV Movie) as Vendor
- The Girl Next Door (1998, TV Movie) as Detective Levine
- The Mystery Files of Shelby Woo (1998) as Norman Emerson
- Starting from Scratch (1998) as Guest Star
- Bonano: A Godfather's Story (1999, TV Movie) (Guest Appearance)
- Killing Moon (1999, TV Movie) as Tag Hunt
- P.T. Barnum (1999, TV Movie) as Levi Lyman
- Lassie (1999) as Mr. Walker
- Execution of Justice (1999, TV Movie) as Coombs
- The Audrey Hepburn Story (2000, TV Movie) as Tiffany's Cab Driver
- The Warden (2001, TV Movie) as Sewell
- Stiletto Dance (2001, TV Movie) as Rick Tucci
- Dice (2001) as Macloud
- Asbestos (2002) as Contremaître J. Franklin
- Federal Protection (2002, TV Movie) as Joseph Pagnozzi
- Agent of Influence (2002, TV Movie) as Steve Lamboise
- Just a Walk in the Park (2002, TV Movie) as Jon
- Obsessed (2002, TV Movie) as Sam Cavallo
- Gleason (2002, TV Movie) as Sammy Birch
- Rudy: The Rudy Giuliani Story (2003, TV Movie) as Tony Carbonetti
- Deception (2003, TV Movie) as Detective Costello
- The Wool Cap (2003, TV Movie) as Veterinarian
- Il Duce Canadese (2004) as Rocco Perri
- Mayday (2005) as Russian Male Voices / Luis Montoya (voice over)
- The Perfect Neighbour (2005, TV Movie) as Phil
- A Lover's Revenge (2005, TV Movie) as Detective Yokum
- Mind Over Murder (2005, TV Movie) as Murphy
- Air Emergency (2005, Documentary) as Russian Male Voices, Luis Montoya (voiceover)
- One Dead Indian (2006, TV Movie) as Government Official #1
- Time Bomb (2006, TV Movie) as Network Director
- 10.5: Apocalypse (2006) as Russ the Poker Player
- Rumours (2006) as Mr. Brewer
- Framed for Murder (2007, TV Movie) as Freed
- Sticks and Stones (2008, TV Movie) as Craig Perkins
- Infected (2008, TV Movie) as Craig Braddock
- My Neighbour's Secret (2009, TV Movie) as Detective Ruiz
- Less Than Kind (2009) as Hector
- The Foundation (2009) as Jerry Renfrew
- Real Detective (2016) as Detective King Barnett
- Trickster (2020)

=== Animation ===
- Samurai Pizza Cats (1990, TV Series) as Jerry Atric
- Sharky and George (1991, TV Series) (English version)
- Charlie Strap and Froggy Ball Flying High (1991)
- Young Robin Hood (1991, TV Series)
- Sinbad (1992)
- Around the World in 80 Dreams (1992, TV Series) as Carlos
- Jungledyret Hugo (1993) as Conrad (English version)
- David Copperfield (1993, TV Movie)
- Chip and Charlie (1993, TV Series)
- The Adventures of Huckleberry Finn (1993)
- Papa Beaver's Storytime (1993, TV Series) as Second Little Pig
- Gino the Chicken (1995) as Gino
- The Little Lulu Show (1995, TV Series)
- Robinson Sucroe (1995, TV Series)
- How the Toys Saved Christmas (1996) as Rascal / Rocko (English version)
- Hugo the Movie Star (1996) as Conrad Cupmann (English version)
- Gulliver's Travels (1996, TV Series)
- Night Hood (1996, TV Series)
- Arthur (1996–2003, TV Series) as Mr. Oliver Frensky (Francine and Catherine's father)
- Princess Sissi (1997, TV Series) as Count Arkas
- The Secret World of Santa Claus (1997) as Gruzzlebeard
- Ivanhoe (1997, TV Series)
- Fennec (1997, TV Series)
- Patrol 03 (1997, TV Series)
- Caillou (1997, TV Series) as Police Officer
- Jungle Show (1997) as Yull the Yak, Walter the Caribou and Fred the Flamingo (English version)
- The Country Mouse and the City Mouse Adventures (1997–1999, TV Series) (uncredited)
- Animal Crackers (1997–1999, TV Series) as Lyle
- 3 Friends and Jerry (1998, TV Series) as Eric
- Kit and Kaboodle (1998, TV Series)
- Tommy and Oscar (1999) as Caesar
- Ripley's Believe It or Not! (1999, TV Series)
- Flight Squad (1999, TV Series) as Dan
- Mona the Vampire (1999, TV Series)
- Journey to the West – Legends of the Monkey King (2000, TV Series) as Pigsy
- Arthur's Perfect Christmas (2000, TV Movie) as Oliver Frensky / Security Guard
- Wunschpunsch (2000–2001, TV Series) (English version)
- Sagwa, the Chinese Siamese Cat (2001, TV Series) as Signor Polo
- The Bellflower Bunnies (2001, TV Series)
- Lucky Luke (2001–2003, TV Series) (English version)
- X-DuckX (2001–2005, TV Series)
- Spaced Out (2002) as George Martin
- Fred the Caveman (2002, TV Series)
- Pig City (2002, TV Series)
- Fred the Caveman (2002, TV Series)
- Daft Planet (2002, TV Series)
- Kaput & Zösky (2002–2003, TV Series) as Zösky
- Student Seduction (2003, TV Movie)
- Kid Paddle (2003, TV Series)
- Malo Korrigan (2003, TV Series)
- Ratz (2003, TV Series) as The Captain
- Flatmania (2004)
- Woofy (2004–2005) as Dad
- Potatoes and Dragons (2004) as Harry / Dragon
- The Boy (2004, TV Series)
- Zoé Kezako (2006, TV Series)
- Jungle Tales (2004, TV Series) as Bela the Bat
- Tupu (2005)
- Stroker and Hoop (2006) as The Fugitive
- Dragon Hunters (2006, TV Series)
- My Goldfish Is Evil! (2006, TV Series)
- Monster Allergy (2006–2008, TV Series) as Zob
- Muumi ja vaarallinen juhannus (2008) as Moominpappa (English version)
- Tripping the Rift – Additional Voices
- Tripping the Rift: The Movie (2008)
- Fred's Head (2008, TV Series) as Paul Leblanc (English version)
- Gofrette (2008, TV Series) as Fudge
- The True History of Puss 'N Boots (2009) as Doc Marcel (English version)
- Ludovic (2009, TV Series) as Dad
- Winx Club (2009, TV Series) as Gantlos (Cinélume version)
- Huntik: Secrets & Seekers (2009, TV Series) as Santiago / Enforcer / Rassimov
- Fishtronaut (2009, TV Series)
- Winx Club 3D: Magica avventura (2010)
- Bad Dog (2010, TV Series)
- Gene Fusion (2011)
- April and the Extraordinary World (2015) as Paul (English version)
- Sahara (2017) as Father Scorpion (English version)
- Troll: The Tale of a Tail (2018) as Grimmer's Father, Limping Lars
- 3 Gold Coins – Additional Voices
- The Adventures of Princess Sydney – Additional Voices
- Albert Says Nature is Best! – Albert
- The Animal Train – Walrus
- Belphegor – Boris Williams
- Billy and Buddy – Additional Voices
- Bimbo – Additional Voices
- Bizby – Additional Voices
- Bronco Teddy – Additional Voices
- Cat Tales – Additional Voices
- Cosmic Cowboys – Additional Voices
- Creepschool – Additional Voices
- Dog's World – Additional Voices
- Eo – Additional Voices
- Eye of the Wolf – Additional Voices
- Go Hugo Go – Conrad Cupmann (voice)
- Golfer's Anonymous – Charlie, Philip
- Gnou – Additional Voices
- Inuk – Additional Voices
- The Kids from Room 402 – Additional Voices
- Kitou – Dad (voice)
- Leon in Wintertime – Mr. Martin (voice)
- The Magical Adventures of Quasimodo – Additional Voices
- Marsupilami – Additional Voices
- Mega Babies – Additional Voices
- Mica – Additional Voices
- Milo – Additional Voices
- Mimi and Friends – Additional Voices
- Momo – Bruno (voice)
- Moot Moot – Additional Voices
- My Life Me – Additional Voices
- Nunavut – Additional Voices
- Ocean Tales – Additional Voices
- Okura – Additional Voices
- Oscar and Spike – Additional Voices
- Pet Pals – Additional Voices
- Pipi, Pupu and Rosemary (2017, TV Series)
- Pirate Family – Additional Voices
- Princess Sissi – Additional Voices
- Prudence Gumshoe – Inspector Duroc (voice)
- Punch – Additional Voices
- Rotten Ralph – Dad (voice)
- Sandokan – Additional Voices
- Sea Dogs – Additional Voices
- Shaolin Kids – Additional Voices
- Snailympics – Additional Voices
- Spirou – Additional Voices
- Team S.O.S. – Additional Voices
- Three Little Ghosts – Additional Voices
- The Three Pigs – The Big Bad Wolf (voice)
- The Tofus – Additional Voices
- The Triplets – Additional Voices
- The Twins – Additional Voices
- What's with Andy? – Mayor Simms, Elwood Larkin, Donny Decker (voice)
- Wombat City – Additional Voices
- X-Chromosome – Additional Voices

=== Video games ===
- Jagged Alliance (1994)
- Jagged Alliance: Deadly Games (1996)
- Yoshi's Story (1997)
- Jagged Alliance 2 (1999) as Kyle 'Shadow' Simmons
- Wizardry 8 (2001)
- Evolution Worlds (2002) as Bodyguards / Kashim
- Splinter Cell (2002) as Thomas Gurgenidze
- Rainbow Six 3: Black Arrow (2004)
- Prince of Persia: Warrior Within (2004) as Sand Warriors
- Splinter Cell: Chaos Theory (2005)
- Still Life (2005) as Jiri Skalnic
- Far Cry Instincts (2005) as Doyle
- Prince of Persia: The Two Thrones (2005)
- Rainbow Six: Vegas (2006)
- TMNT (2007) as Max Winters
- Naruto: Rise of a Ninja (2007)
- Rainbow Six Vegas 2 (2008) as Dennis Cohen / Alvarez Cobrero
- Assassin's Creed II (2009)

=== Voice director ===
- Doggy Day School
- Gon
- Rainbow Six: Siege
- Splinter Cell: Conviction
- Supernatural: The Animation (also an ADR Director)
- Watch Dogs
- Winx Club
