= Pauline Little =

Canadian actress

- Born: Scotland
- Occupation: Actress
- Years active: 1975–present
- Known for: The Little Lulu Show (1996–1998); The Triplets (1997–1999); Caillou (1997–2000)
- Spouse: Mark Camacho (m. 1988)
- Children: 2, including Jesse Camacho

Pauline Little is a Scottish-born Canadian voice, film, and television actress.

She voices the twins Lotus and Jasmine in The Little Flying Bears, Maya in Maya the Bee, Francine in Samurai Pizza Cats and Caillou's Grandma in Caillou.

She can also be seen in The Day After Tomorrow and Last Exit. Her stage roles included the 1993 production of Peter Cureton's Passages.

== Personal life ==
Born in Scotland to theatrical parents, Little was raised in Montreal. Pauline graduated with a BFA in Theatre Performance from Concordia University in 1982 and began acting soon after. She started in theatre and then moved on to movies and television, but later moved on to doing voice acting work for animation.

She is married to actor and fellow Canadian Mark Camacho. Their son, Jesse Camacho, is also an actor, best known for the television series Less Than Kind.

== Filmography ==
=== Films ===
- The Education of Little Tree - Mrs. Higginbotham
- Buster (1988)
- Isn't She Great - Leslie Barnett
- The Neighbor - Rebecca
- Wicked Mines - Nicole's lawyer
- Last Exit - Courier Clerk
- The Day After Tomorrow - Lanson (SSL)
- Let Them Eat - Madame Bault/Greta
- Gleason - Motel Manager
- Shades of Love: Moonlight Flight - Heavy Metal Singer
- I'm Not There - Lady with Tape Recorder
- Jackie Bouvier Kennedy Onassis - Nurse Rita Dallas
- Shattered Glass - Monica Merchant #2

=== Television ===
- The Bill - Mrs. Williams / Lorraine Davis / Strippergram / Tina Roberts
- The Mystery Files of Shelby Woo - Rita Shaw
- Starting from Scratch - Mrs. Silver
- Naked Josh - Gisele
- Fries with That? - Guest star
- Vampire High - Ms. Armstrong
- Taggart - W.P.C. Drummond
- Kitty Cats - Rosie
- Are You Afraid of the Dark? - Aunt Dottie/Librarian/Ruth Buckley
- Dear John - The Neighbour
- Gems - Guest star
- The Hitchhiker - Cashier
- Killer Wave - Red Cross Administrator
- Misguided Angels - Dinah

=== Animation ===
- The Little Flying Bears - Lotus / Jasmine
- Ovide Video - TV Hostess
- Maya the Bee - Maya
- The Triplets - Tessa
- Arthur - Miss Krasny
- Caillou - Grandma
- The Little Lulu Show - Martha Moppet
- Caillou's Holiday Movie - Grandma / Elderly Woman
- Papa Beaver's Storytime - Granddaughter
- Cat Tales - Marinette
- The Legend of White Fang - Additional voices
- Tripping the Rift - Additional voices
- Tripping the Rift: The Movie - Additional voices
- The Bush Baby - Jackie
- Sharky and George - Additional voices
- Samurai Pizza Cats - Francine Manx
- Diplodos - Old Lady
- Ulysses 31 - Ariadne/Nanette
- Jungle Book Shonen Mowgli - Lala
- Bob in a Bottle - Additional voices
- Robinson Sucroe - Additional voices
- Wunschpunsch - Council Goat
- For Better or For Worse: A Christmas Angel - Additional voices
- Monster Allergy - Greta
- Around the World in 80 Dreams - Koki
- The Tofus - Beth
- Kid Paddle - Carole Paddle
- Fred's Head - Ms. Pyrowski
- The Country Mouse and the City Mouse Adventures - Young Girl
- Saban's Adventures of Peter Pan - Tinkerbell
- Saban's Adventures of the Little Mermaid - Additional voices
- Saban's Adventures of Pinocchio - Additional voices
- The Marco Polo: Queen of the Seas - Character voice
- Animal Crackers - Additional voices
- Night Hood - Additional voices
- Flight Squad - Additional voices
- Marsupilami - Additional voices
- The Kids from Room 402 - Mrs. Amy Bellanchof
- Charlie Strap and Froggy Ball Flying High - Kottegrön
- Mega Babies - Additional voices
- The Twins - Additional voices
- The Adventures of Teddy Ruxpin - Additional voices
- Woofy - Additional voices
- Patrol 03 - Additional voices
- Kitou - Additional voices
- Zoe and Charlie - Additional voices
- The Wombles - Moosonee Womble
- The New Adventures of Lucky Luke - Calamity Jane
- Fred the Caveman - Additional voices
- X-DuckX - Additional voices
- The Boy - Mother
- Tupu - Additional voices
- Nunavut - Additional voices
- Winx Club - Additional voices
- Ivanhoe - Additional voices
- Bimbo - Various
- The Magical Adventures of Quasimodo - Additional voices
- Sandokan - Mariana/Suyodhamu
- Belle and Sebastian - Sarah
- Gofrette - Ellie
- Bumpety Boo - Character voice
- For Better or For Worse - Additional voices
- Pet Pals - Additional voices
- Jim Button - Additional voices
- The Mysterious Cities of Gold - Additional voices
- Tommy and Oscar - Additional voices
- Astro Boy - Additional voices
- Ocean Tales - Additional voices
- Pig City - Additional voices
- Ripley's Believe It or Not! - Additional voices
- Christopher Columbus - Beatrix
- Team S.O.S. - Character voice
- Momo - Livia
- Turtle Island - Additional voices
- Mona the Vampire - Additional voices
- Belphegor - Character voice
- Nutsberry Town - Wendy Walnut
- Spirou - Additional voices
- Billy and Buddy - Additional voices
- Lola and Virginia - Haely
- The Triplets - Helena
- Kit and Kaboodle - Character voice
- Lili's Island - Character voice
- Mica - Character voice
- Daft Planet - Additional voices
- Pipi, Pipu and Rosemary - Character voice
- Jungle Tales - Character voice
- Oscar and Spike - Character voice
- Creepschool - Additional voices
- Bizby - Character voice
- 3 Gold Coins - Character voice
- Simon in the Land of Chalk Drawings - Additional voices
- Chip and Charlie - Additional voices
- Dragon Hunters - Additional voices
- Yakari - Rainbow
- Fennec - Character voice
- Dog's World - Character voice
- Wombat City - Additional voices
- Sagwa, the Chinese Siamese Cat - Additional voices
- The Adventures of Princess Sydney - Character voice
- My Goldfish Is Evil! - Additional voices
- Bad Dog - Additional voices
- X-Chromosome - Additional voices
- Prudence Gumshoe - Character voice
- Sea Dogs - Character voice
- Ratz - Character voice
- Flat! - Additional voices
- Okura - Voice
- My Life Me - Various
- Gene Fusion - Various
- Punch! - Voice
- Eo - Various
- Bronco Teddy - Various
- Moot Moot - Character voice
- Katak: The Brave Beluga (Katak, le brave béluga)

=== Video games ===
- Wizardry 8 - Character voice
- Evolution Worlds - Chain Gun/Cary
- Jagged Alliance: Deadly Games - Character voice
- Jagged Alliance 2 - Norma 'Meltdown' Jessop
- Jagged Alliance 2: Unfinished Business - Character voice
- Assassin's Creed - Additional voices
- Still Life - Claire Ashby
- Beowulf: The Game - Character voice
