= Carrie Finlay =

Canadian actress

- Occupation: Actress
- Known for: Lily Duncan - Mona the Vampire; Melodine - Potatoes and Dragons

Carrie Finlay is a Canadian actress. She began her professional career as an actress, first appearing as a voice actress in the Canadian-French-Chinese animated television series Mona the Vampire in 1999. She has had several live-action roles, appearing in The Worst Witch, Gambling and Addiction, The Gazette, The Reagans, The Score and Timeline. She has also appeared onstage in several productions.

Finlay attended the Faculty of Law at McGill University.

== Filmography ==
=== Animation ===
- Arthur
- The Bellflower Bunnies
- Billy and Buddy
- The Boy
- Bratz
- Caillou
- Creepschool
- Daft Planet
- Dragon Hunters
- For Better or For Worse
- Kid Paddle
- The Kids from Room 402
- Lola and Virginia
- Marsupilami
- Momo
- Mona the Vampire - Lily Duncan (Princess Giant)
- Monster Allergy
- Monster Buster Club
- My Goldfish is Evil
- Nunavut
- Pirate Family
- PopPixie
- Potatoes and Dragons - Melodine
- Prudence Gumshoe
- Ripley's Believe It or Not
- Sagwa, the Chinese Siamese Cat
- Shaolin Kids
- Simon in the Land of Chalk Drawings
- Spaced Out
- Tripping the Rift
- Winx Club
- Tupu
- Upstairs, Downstairs Bears
- What's with Andy?
- Wombat City
- Woofy
- X-DuckX
- Zoé Kezako

=== Film and television ===
- Gambling and Addiction
- The Gazette
- The Reagans
- The Score
- Timeline
- The Worst Witch
