= The Northlander (film) =

- Theatrical release poster
- Directed by: Benjamin Ross Hayden
- Written by: Benjamin Ross Hayden
- Produced by: Benjamin Ross Hayden; Wendy Hill-Tout; Jeremy Torrie; Adam Beach; Jim Compton
- Starring: Corey Sevier; Roseanne Supernault; Michelle Thrush
- Cinematography: Dan Dumouchel
- Music by: Michalis Andronikou
- Production company: Manifold Pictures
- Distributed by: Raven Banner Entertainment
- Release date: 9 September 2016 (Montreal World Film Festival)
- Running time: 98 minutes
- Country: Canada
- Language: English

The Northlander is a 2016 Canadian fantasy adventure film written and directed by Benjamin Ross Hayden. The film stars Corey Sevier as Cygnus, Roseanne Supernault as Mari, and Michelle Thrush as Nova. The film was produced by Benjamin Ross Hayden's production company Manifold Pictures and filmed in Alberta.

The film premiered at the 40th Montreal World Film Festival. The film was selected in the Perspective Canada program at Cannes in 2016. It was distributed under the banner Raven Banner Entertainment theatrically in Canada. The Northlander was lauded as one among "8 of indigenous cinema's most important films" by i-D magazine. The Northlander theatrically opened in over ten major cities across Canada between October 2016 and April 2017.

The Northlander won Best Screenplay Award at the 40th Alberta Film & Television Awards, and for directing the film Hayden was awarded the RBC Artist Award at the Mayor's Lunch for Arts Champions.

== Plot ==
In the year 2961, the time is after humanity and nature have recovered the land. A hunter named Cygnus is called to protect his people. He travels across a desert valley to protect his tribe against a band of Heretics and must find a way for his tribe to survive.

The story is inspired by the historic journey of the Métis leader Louis Riel away from Batoche, Saskatchewan toward the Montana mountains in the 1880s.

The film's futuristic styling of Canadian history has the film contributing to the science fiction movements of Indigenous Futurism.

== Cast ==
- Corey Sevier as Cygnus
- Roseanne Supernault as Mari
- Michelle Thrush as Nova
- Nathaniel Arcand
- Julian Black Antelope

== Accolades ==
Award	Date of ceremony	Category	Recipients	Result	Ref.
AMPIA Awards	2016	Best Dramatic Feature Film	Benjamin Ross Hayden	Nominated	
AMPIA Awards	2016	Best Director	Benjamin Ross Hayden	Nominated	
AMPIA Awards	2016	Best Screenwriter	Benjamin Ross Hayden	Won	
AMPIA Awards	2016	Best Performance by an Alberta Actor	Nathaniel Arcand	Nominated	
AMPIA Awards	2016	Best Performance by an Alberta Actress	Michelle Thrush	Nominated	
AMPIA Awards	2016	Best Costume Designer	Dee Fontans, Shannon Chappell, Jessica Waddell & Samantha Huskisson	Nominated	
Leo Awards	May 27, 2017	Best Makeup Design	Melissa Meretsky, Jennifer Walton	Won	
Canadian Screen Awards	March 12, 2017	Best Makeup Design	Melissa Meretsky, Jennifer Walton, Lisa Belyea	Nominated	

== See also ==
- List of Canadian films of 2016
