= The Neighbor (1993 film) =

- Directed by: Rodney Gibbons
- Written by: Kurt Wimmer
- Produced by: Tom Berry
- Starring: Rod Steiger; Linda Kozlowski
- Cinematography: Ludek Bogner
- Edited by: Robert E. Newton
- Music by: Milan Kymlicka
- Production companies: Allegro Films; Image Organization; Téléfilm Canada (produced in association with) Westwind
- Distributed by: Academy Entertainment
- Release date: November 3, 1993
- Running time: 1hr 33min.
- Countries: United States; Canada
- Language: English

The Neighbor is a 1993 horror thriller film directed by Rodney Gibbons, starring Rod Steiger, Linda Kozlowski and Ron Lea.

== Plot ==
The film is about an aging gynecologist (Rod Steiger) with a "killer instinct" who terrorizes his urban neighbors (Linda Kozlowski and Ron Lea) in a rural community in Burlington, Vermont.

== Cast ==
- Rod Steiger as Dr. Myron Hatch
  - Benjamin Shirinian as Young Myron Hatch
- Linda Kozlowski as Mary / Mrs. Hatch
- Ron Lea as John
- Bruce Boa as Bishop
- Jane Wheeler as Dr. Wayburn
- Sean McCann as Lieutenant Crow
- Frances Bay as Aunt Sylvia
- Harry Standjofski as Morrie
- Pauline Little as Rebecca
- Mark Camacho as Bank Manager
- Claire Riley as Dr. Statner
- Linda Singer as Clinic Receptionist
- Philip Spensley as The Pharmacist
- Gordon Masten as City Worker

== Production ==
While filming, Steiger commented on his character: "He's a person whose acts are villainous and sad, a sick person. Otherwise, I couldn't play him. I don't know how you do a villain. But I can understand a person having the psychosis". Opining that contemporary films were "all too violent for no reason", he iterated that The Neighbor was a thriller, "not a bloodbath".

== Reception ==
The film was not well received by critics. Dennis Schwartz considered it to have been one of Steiger's creepiest roles, believing that the poor script had rendered the role awkward and "mildly entertaining in the sense that Steiger is asked to carry the film and hams it up". "Despite slick production values and some clever Hitchcockian touches, there is little to distinguish The Neighbor from formulaic made-for-TV fare", writes Cavett Binion for Allmovie, giving 3 of 5 stars. Rod Steiger's performance has been described as "decent", though the movie is "extremely predictable". In the Canadian press, the film was described as "an unpleasant Canadian effort" which for "some obscure reason ... made a brief pit stop in theatres last month before heading for video".
