= Jesse Noah Klein =

Canadian film director and screenwriter

Jesse Noah Klein is a Canadian film director and screenwriter from Montreal, Quebec, whose debut feature film Shadowboxing was released in 2011.

He is a graduate of Concordia University. Shadowboxing was screened at the 2011 Rendez-vous Québec Cinéma, but saw little further distribution beyond small independent film festivals.

He saw greater success with his second film, We're Still Together, which premiered at the 51st Karlovy Vary International Film Festival in 2016, before going into commercial release in 2017. He wrote the film in part as a vehicle for his brother, actor Joey Klein, out of a belief that Joey had not yet succeeded in landing a role that showed off his talent; Joey Klein and co-star Jesse Camacho both received Prix Iris nominations for Best Actor at the 20th Quebec Cinema Awards, and both won Best Actor awards from different regional chapters of the ACTRA Awards program.

He followed up with the films Like a House on Fire in 2021, and Best Boy in 2025.
