= The Magical Adventures of Quasimodo =

Canadian animated television series

- Also known as: Quasimodo
- Genre: Fantasy; Adventure
- Based on: Notre Dame de Paris by Victor Hugo
- Voices of: Sonja Ball; Daniel Brochu; A. J. Henderson; Harry Hill; Rick Jones; Anik Matern; Eleanor Noble; Michael O'Reilly; Terrence Scammell; Vlasta Vrána
- Countries of origin: Canada; France
- Original languages: English; French
- No. of episodes: 26

Production
- Executive producer: Ares Films
- Producer: Pierre Métais
- Production location: Paris
- Running time: 26 minutes
- Production companies: CinéGroupe; Tele Images; Astral Media

Original release
- Network: Family Channel (Canada); France 3 (France)
- Release: 1996

The Magical Adventures of Quasimodo is an animated television series based on Victor Hugo's 1831 novel Notre Dame de Paris.

The show was produced by Ares Films, CinéGroupe, Télé-Images, and Astral Media. It aired in 1996, the same year Disney's adaptation of the story was released.

The series takes place in Paris, in 1483. The three main characters are Quasimodo, Esmeralda and François. They fight villains, stop sinister plots, and escape from traps. They often come face to face with their greatest enemy, Frollo.

In 2006, BCI, with Hearst Entertainment, released two episodes on DVD within their "Advantage Cartoon Mega Pack". In 2009, Mill Creek Entertainment released a complete set containing all 26 episodes of the series.

== Characters ==
=== Main cast ===
- Quasimodo (Jacques de Bernasack) – A 16-year-old hunchback who is the title character of the series.
- Esmeralda – A beautiful young Romani dancer.
- François – Esmeralda's brother, who is a poet.
- Djali – Esmeralda's goat.
- Arabelle – A horse.
- Claude Frollo – The main antagonist of the series, and Quasimodo's former master. A demonic magician in his own right, he plots to become the King of France.
- Azarof – Frollo's loyal dog.
- Dennis – The alchemist, who is a friend of Quasimodo and the King.
- Angelica – Esmeralda and François' adopted grandmother.

=== Secondary and episodic characters ===
- King Louis XI – The elderly ruler of France.
- Charles and Vivianne de Bernasack – Powerful alchemists who are Quasimodo's parents.
- Maria Villon – Quasimodo's former nanny.
- Leonardo da Vinci – a young genius, engineer, and artist.
- Mildred – Leonardo's carrier pigeon.
- Manolo – A Romani baron and Angelica's old friend.
- Vernier – A constable.
- Margarita – An orphanage teacher.
- Fox – A highwayman, "the man of a thousand faces".
- Bobo, Alfons, and Loran – Rasperin's errand boys.
- Ferdinand – Angelica's brother and Esmeralda's godfather.
- Carlos – Ferdinand's son.
- Roger – An architect.
- Andreas – A sculptor and former thief.
- Gaspard – A one-eyed friend of Angelica.
- Gustavo – A boatman.
- Lucile and Robert la Fleur – The children of the late Mark and Mirelle la Fleur, who were good friends of Quasimodo's parents.
- Isabelle – The High Priestess of the Council of Magicians.
- The Abomination (Robert la Fete) – A lizard/human hybrid and magician who was Frollo's ex-assistant.
- Guy – A highlander, former bell ringer, and Quasimodo's grandfather.
- Clopin's thieves – A group of young children who work for Clopin and steal things for him.
- Sylvia the Wise – A Romani alchemist.
- Maurice – Dennis' cousin and a country doctor.
- Pierre – A young architect who is Quasimodo's childhood friend.
- Henri – An elderly architect who is Pierre's father.
- Red-haired street girl – A young girl who lives in the Court of Miracles and was hypnotised by Clopin to dance for him. It is unknown if she is one of Clopin's thieves or if she is one herself but it hinted to be Clopin's favourite due to his interested nature in her.

=== Villains ===
- Raoul Fortin – A criminal hired by Frollo to assassinate the King.
- Jester – A buffoon and thief.
- Oracle – A seer who was Frollo's former partner.
- Camille Eon – A powerful shapeshifter and Frollo's old acquaintance.
- Armand, Pierre, Jean-Luke and Marcel – Thieves from the Court of Miracles.
- Biddle – Maria's former employer.
- Larus – A cruel tax collector.
- Rasperin – The corrupt owner of the Half-Moon Inn.
- Baron Guillaume – The tyrannical owner of the Valley of the Auvergne.
- Gilbere – Guillaume's right-hand man.
- Lorlof – Frollo's alter-ego.
- Tiffan – The brutal warrior-chief of the Mercenaries.
- Clopin – The leader of a gang of thieves, a mentor of training child thieves, wandering gossip, and Frollo's old acquaintance.
- Casimir – The evil cousin of the Romani king, who wants to take his place.

== Episodes ==
#	Title	Summary
1	Evil Unmasked	The young hunchback Quasimodo lives in Notre-Dame Cathedral alongside his master Claude Frollo, his dog Azarof, and Dennis the alchemist. While Quasimodo masters up the courage to go outside the cathedral and talk to a beautiful Romani girl, Frollo conceives a plan to kill King Louis XI.
2	Frollo's Revenge	After Frollo's plan is ruined, the magician flies away on a gargoyle into the catacombs. Before Dennis and Quasimodo begin to search for Quasimodo's parents, Esmeralda and her family come to the cathedral to say goodbye.
3	The Carnival of Fools	At the Carnival of Fools, a suspiciously-looking buffoon jester wins the opportunity to perform in front of the King. Esmeralda decides to discover the jester's real intentions.
4	The Star Master	While Quasimodo, Esmeralda and François are having a picnic, strange things began to happen. Dennis creates a theory that these oddities are due to a fallen star, and it is up to Quasimodo and his friends to destroy the star before it is too late.
5	A Trip to Italy	On their way back to Paris, Quasimodo and the gang find a carrier pigeon with a letter, which contains a plan for world domination. Frollo finds out about the plan, and decides to uncover its details with a help of a powerful magician called Camille Eon.
6	The Invisible Thieves	The Duke's treasure is stolen, and Angelica's pendant planted at the scene gets Angelica thrown in prison. To prove Angelica's innocence, Quasimodo and his friends follow a devious puppeteer.
7	The Court of Miracles	After no-one wants to listen to François' poems, the poet encounters thieves who lead him to the Court of Miracles. François become friends with the thieves, and decides to show them the cathedral.
8	Witches' Eve	On Witches' Eve, Quasimodo and the gang meet a young woman, who may hold the key to where Quasimodo's parents might be, leading Quasimodo onto a trail to find them. Frollo however is already on the move to find the alchemist couple first.
9	Trapped	To save the orphanage, Dennis and François travel to Fourge, but on their way back to Paris, they discover that their gold has been replaced with rocks. Quasimodo and his friends must find the lost treasure and save the orphanage until tomorrow morning.
10	Dragon Rock	Quasimodo, Esmeralda and François travel to Dragon Rock to help the needy, but when they arrive, the friends discover that the locals don't need their help since the arrival of the Generous One. Quasimodo and the gang decide to uncover the real identity of the mysterious patron.
11	The Clay Army	On the March of Progress, Frollo plans to create an army of tiny clay figurines resembling gargoyles, that will help him steal the royal treasures, so that he can buy everything necessary to create the Philosopher's stone.
12	The Choice	While Esmeralda and François get ready to go to the seaside and perform for the King, Quasimodo hears that his parents are in Lujon, and are waiting for a ship to take them to England.
13	The Man who wouldn't be King	Frollo accidentally creates a potion that can transform the drinker into the person they look at. Using this potion, Frollo impersonates King Louis and spreads chaos in the kingdom.
14	Hope Springs Eternal	Quasimodo, still determined to find his parents, decides to visit his family's abandoned castle.
15	The Beast	A fever is raging in Paris. Dennis, the only one who knows how to make a cure, also becomes sick, and Djali has eaten all the medicinal herbs. Quasimodo and his friends travel to the Valley of the Auvergne to find more herbs, while running away from a giant wolf.
16	The Duel of the Magicians	Esmeralda's magical medallion stops working. Angelica tells the story of the amulet, and Quasimodo and the gang decide to go into the Forest of Valnivier to find the Council of Magicians.
17	The Abomination's Revenge	Frollo is being chased by the Abomination, who wants revenge for what Frollo did to him, leaving a path of destruction around Paris. Quasimodo and his friends are forced to help the fearful magician.
18	The Mercenary	Dennis and his guards get captured by Tiffan and his Mercenaries. While Quasimodo and François join the army, Esmeralda disguises herself to join her friends on a campaign, and Frollo plans to form an alliance with Tiffan.
19	A Song of the Heart	Quasimodo has composed a new melody for the bells, but he is not sure that he can play it correctly. He and his friends decide to go to the mountains to gather some herbs, but they don't know that Frollo is also heading to the mountains to find a mysterious highlander.
20	The Music Master	After band of street kids, who work for Clopin, steal things for him, they end up finding a magic flute that gives its owner the power to command others, leading Frollo to collaborate with Clopin in his next plan to become the King of France.
21	The Eye of the Eagle	While exploring Notre Dame, Quasimodo finds a hidden message from his parents. Frollo sends a gargoyle to intercept the message, but, as a result, the letter is torn in two. The bell ringer and his friends must find a Romani who can read invisible letters before Frollo can get his hands on it.
22	The Oracle	Quasimodo and the gang receive a message from Angelica saying that Dennis' cousin Maurice has been thrown in prison. They travel to Boisjoli, and discover that the villagers are sick and subordinate to the Oracle, who blames Angelica and Maurice for the epidemic.
23	The Treasure	A mysterious shadow appears now and then over the construction site of St. Bernard University, and the drawings and plans of the building disappear without a trace. Quasimodo and his friends have to find the reason for all these oddities.
24	A True Gypsy	While Quasimodo and his friends visit the Roma camp, the Romani king is kidnapped by his evil cousin Casimir, who wants to take the king's place. Quasimodo challenges Casimir for his exile against eternal imprisonment.
25	The Guardians	
26	The Secret of the Templars	

== Cast ==
The actors and actresses, who did the voices for the show, are:

- Sonja Ball – Various
- Daniel Brochu – Quasimodo
- Mark Camacho – Various
- Richard Dumont – Various
- Susan Glover – Various
- A. J. Henderson – Dennis
- Harry Hill – Various
- Arthur Holden – Various
- Rick Jones
- Pauline Little – Various
- Bronwen Mantel
- Anik Matern
- Eleanor Noble – Esmeralda
- Michael O'Reilly – Casimir
- Terrence Scammell – François/Azarof
- Vlasta Vrána – Frollo
