= Jesse Camacho =

Canadian actor and comedian (born 1991)

- Born: May 29, 1991 (age 35); Montreal, Quebec, Canada
- Occupations: Actor; comedian
- Years active: 1994–present
- Known for: Less Than Kind
- Parents: Mark Camacho (father); Pauline Little (mother)

Jesse Camacho (born May 29, 1991) is a Canadian actor and comedian. He is best known for his role as Sheldon Blecher in the television series Less Than Kind.

== Early life ==
The son of actors Mark Camacho and Pauline Little, Camacho was born on May 29, 1991, in Montreal, Quebec, Canada. He began acting in childhood, with his early credits including the television series Creepschool and Fries with That? and the films Hatley High and 12 and Holding. He attended Westmount High School in Montreal, Quebec, and briefly attended Dawson College before dropping out to continue his leading role on the HBO Canada series Less Than Kind.

== Career ==
Camacho's other credits have included roles in the television series Mother Up!, St. Urbain's Horseman and Death Comes to Town, and the films The Trotsky, We're Still Together and Rapture-Palooza. Also, he provides the voice of Binky in Agent Binky: Pets of the Universe (2019-present).

In 2019, he was cast as Doug Brazelle in the hit Netflix series Locke & Key and returned in the show's second season. Camacho was a shortlisted nominee for Best Lead Actor in a Comedy Series at the 2nd Canadian Screen Awards.

== Personal life ==
Since 2013, Camacho has lived in Toronto, Ontario, Canada.

== Filmography ==
=== Film ===
Year	Title	Role	Notes
1994	The NeverEnding Story III	Beaver Boy	Uncredited
2002	Summer	Jasper	
2003	Hatley High	Jasper	
2005	12 and Holding	Leonard Fisher	
2006	The Forgotten Ones	Arnold	
2008	Summerhood	Grandpa	
2009	The Velveteen Rabbit	Catcher	Live-action produced in 2000
2009	The Trotsky	Skip	
2013	Rapture-Palooza	Fry	
2013	Happy Slapping	Boomer	
2013	Kick-Ass 2	Onlooker	
2013	Clydecynic	Kevin Thomson	
2015	Lost After Dark	Tobe	
2015	My Ex-Ex	Jim	
2015	Kids vs Monsters	Bobby	
2016	We're Still Together	Chris	
2019	Good Sam	Josh	
2019	Boys vs. Girls	Ben	
2022	Vandits	Guy	
2026	Lucky Weekend		

=== Television ===
Year	Title	Role	Notes
2000	Big Wolf on Campus	Young Travis Eckert	Episode: "Commie Dawkins"
2001	Sagwa, the Chinese Siamese Cat	Shao-Pao (voice)	2 episodes
2001	The Neverending Story	Beaver Boy	Episode: "Deus Ex Machina"
2002	Just a Walk in the Park	Baseball Kid	Television film
2002–2005	Arthur	James MacDonald / Alex (voices)	4 episodes
2003	Rudy: The Rudy Giuliani Story	Andrew Giuliani	Television film
2004	Boule et Bill	Boule	all episodes
2004	Creepschool	Josh (voice)	3 episodes
2007	St. Urbain's Horseman	Young Duddy Kravitz	Episode: "Part 1 & 2"
2008–2013	Less Than Kind	Sheldon Blecher	42 episodes
2010	The Kids in the Hall: Death Comes to Town	Liquor Store Clerk	Episode: "Who Mailed Our Mayor?"
2010	My Life Me	Additional voice	Episode: "Misconcepted Deceptions"
2013	Nicky Deuce	Josh	Television film
2013	Mother Up!	Dick Wilson (voice)	13 episodes
2014	How to Build a Better Boy	Tony	Television film
2015	Kept Woman	Oscar Garrett	Television film
2015–2016	This Life	Big Mike Alva	6 episodes
2016	Man Seeking Woman	Pete Hoffman	Episode: "Card"
2017	#VitalSignz	The Commissioner	Episode: "The Adventures of Geriatric Man!"
2017	Fugazi	Nicky Faraldi	Television film
2018	Night Owl	Carlos	6 episodes
2018	The Truth About the Harry Quebert Affair	Reporter #2	Episode: "How Does Your Garden Grow?"
2018	Shadowhunters	Leo	Episode: "Thy Soul Instructed"
2018	Insomnia	Teddy	5 episodes
2019	Cardinal	Storage Mick	2 episodes
2019–present	Agent Binky: Pets of the Universe	Agent Binky (voice)	78 episodes
2020–2021	Locke & Key	Doug Brazelle	12 episodes
2021	The Communist's Daughter	Larry	Episode: "Mall Bangs"
2021	Nine Films About Technology	Daryl	Episode: "Everything is Fine"
2022	Workin' Moms	Buddy	2 episodes
2022	Kiss the Cook	Kinsley	Television film
2023	Murdoch Mysteries	Gregory Berkshire	
2024–present	The Trades	Homer	
