= 2016 in Canadian television =

The following is a list of events affecting Canadian television in 2016. Events listed include television show debuts, finales, cancellations, and channel launches, closures and rebrandings.

== Events ==
=== Notable events ===
==== January ====
Date	Event
13	Corus Entertainment enters a deal to acquire the assets of Shaw Media, including the Global Television Network.

==== February ====
Date	Event
29	The Biography Channel, owned by Rogers Media, is rebranded in conjunction with Vice magazine as a Canadian version of Viceland.

==== March ====
Date	Event
13	The 4th Canadian Screen Awards airs on CBC.

==== April ====
Date	Event
1	Corus Entertainment completes their acquisition of Shaw Media and adopts a new logo.
10	Stéphanie St-Jean wins the fourth season of La Voix.
30	TVA Group closes Argent, a French-language channel which focused on business news and financial information, due to poor profitability.

==== May ====
Date	Event
4	Bell Media acquires Gusto TV and the Gusto brand from Knight Enterprises.
12	Nick and Phil Paquette win the fourth season of Big Brother Canada.

==== June ====
Date	Event
3	After being cancelled the previous day, CTV's morning show Canada AM airs for the last time. Canada AM has aired on CTV since 1972.
14	Rogers Media files an application with the CRTC to convert OMNI Television, currently a system of four multicultural television stations in major metropolitan cities, into a nationally distributed cable channel.
15	The CRTC announces a new policy for the provision of local news content on Canadian television stations, now requiring a minimum of just seven hours per week on non-metropolitan stations and creating a new local news fund to assist in paying for that programming.

==== August ====
Date	Event
8-19	The CTV Television Network airs the first season of Game of Thrones unedited, and with reduced commercial time at 10 p.m. in all markets. This is the first time Game of Thrones has aired on network television in North America.
20	Following Gord Downie's diagnosis with glioblastoma, the Canadian Broadcasting Corporation broadcasts The Tragically Hip: A National Celebration, iconic Canadian rock band The Tragically Hip's August 20 concert at the K-Rock Centre in their hometown of Kingston, as a live cross-platform broadcast on CBC Television, CBC Radio One, CBC Radio 2, CBC Music and YouTube.
22	Your Morning, the replacement for Canada AM, premieres on CTV stations in Eastern Canada and on the CTV News Channel nationwide.

==== September ====
Date	Event
1	Bell Media shuts down M3 after nearly 2 decades of operation. The channel was replaced with Gusto across various TV providers.
5	Peter Mansbridge, the longtime anchor of CBC Television's newscast The National, announces that he will retire in 2017 following the network's special Canada Day broadcast on July 1.
7	CHCH announces it will resume broadcasting local news on the weekends in the form of two half-hours of news programming at 6pm and 11pm starting October 29, 2016. The station previously aired weekend news until December 2015 when the station's news division filed for bankruptcy.

== Television programs ==
=== Programs debuting in 2016 ===
Series currently listed here have been announced by their respective networks as scheduled to premiere in 2016. Note that shows may be delayed or cancelled by the network between now and their scheduled air dates.

Start date	Show	Channel	Source
January	Lost & Found Music Studios	Family Channel	
January 4	Total Drama Presents: The Ridonculous Race	Cartoon Network	
January 8	Hello Goodbye	CBC Television	
January 11	Les Pays d'en haut	Ici Radio-Canada Télé	
February 7	Letterkenny	CraveTV, The Comedy Network	
April 4	Wynonna Earp	CHCH-DT	
April 24	Home to Win	HGTV	
May 8	Raising Expectations	Family Channel	
May 24	St. Nickel	Unis	
May 26	Private Eyes	Global	
June 14	Baroness von Sketch Show	CBC Television	
July 6	Cheer Squad	ABC Spark	
July 25	The Switch	OutTV	
August 22	Your Morning	CTV	
August 28	Four in the Morning	CBC Television	
September 4	Hip-Hop Evolution	HBO Canada	
September 5	Tricked	YTV	
September 5	Ranger Rob	Treehouse TV	
September 6	Dot.	CBC Television	
September 10	Snapshots	CBC Television	
September 12	District 31	Ici Radio-Canada Télé	
October 2	This Is High School	CBC Television	
October 3	The Goods	CBC Television	
October 4	Kim's Convenience	CBC Television	
October 10	Shoot the Messenger	CBC Television	
October 17	Travelers	Showcase	
October 27	Second Jen	City	
November 1	Counterfeit Cat	Teletoon	
November 6	Frontier	Discovery, CraveTV	
November 9	The Beaverton	The Comedy Network	

=== Programs ending in 2016 ===
Series currently listed here have been announced by their respective networks as scheduled to premiere in 2016. Note that shows may be delayed or cancelled by the network between now and their scheduled air dates.

End date	Show	Channel	Source
April 1	Fugget About It	Adult Swim	

== Networks and services ==
=== Closures ===
Network	Type	Date	Notes
The Pet Network		May 2	
ichannel		August 15	
M3		September 1	

== Television stations ==
=== Network affiliation changes ===
Date	Market	Station	Channel	Old affiliation	New affiliation	References
February 22	Dawson Creek, British Columbia	CJDC-TV	5 (analogue)	CBC	CTV 2	
February 22	Terrace, British Columbia	CFTK-TV	3 (Analogue)	CBC	CTV 2	
September 1	Lloydminster, Alberta-Saskatchewan	CKSA-DT	2.1	CBC	Global	

== Deaths ==
Date	Name	Notability
October 9	Susan Aceron	Actress (Sailor Moon)

== See also ==
- 2016 in Canada
- List of Canadian films of 2016
