= Sharky & George =

- Title card
- Also known as: Sharky et Georges (French)
- Genre: Animation
- Created by: Michael Haillard (writer); Patrick Regnard (writer); Tony Scott (writer)
- Starring: A.J. Henderson (Sharky); Paul Hawkins (George)
- Opening theme: Phillipe Bouvet
- Countries of origin: Canada; France
- Original languages: French; English
- No. of seasons: 2
- No. of episodes: 52

Production
- Executive producer: Jacques Pettigrew
- Production companies: CinéGroupe and Label 35

Original release
- Release: 1990 – 1992

Sharky & George (French: Sharky et Georges) is a children's animated series, produced by animation studios CinéGroupe and Label 35 between 1990 and 1992. The series consisted of fifty-two 25 minute episodes, including two 12 minute editions which were sometimes aired separately. The series was later dubbed into English and shown in the United Kingdom on Channel 4 from 1991 to 1998.

== Premise ==
Sharky & George is set in the underwater city of Seacago, populated by various kinds of fish. The protagonists are two fish private detectives who run their own agency. Sharky, the bigger fish, is a rather lazy pink shark with a huge nose, and wears a Humphrey Bogart-style fedora hat. George, the smaller fish, is blue with a yellow face, and is younger than Sharky.

The two friends combat the mad plans of conquest of the many villains and gangs that are terrorizing Seacago, including Lefty Hook, Harry Flix, the three thugs: Nova, Scotia and Lox, the Piranhas, Fishy Ben Backstabber, Dr. Medusa (Dr. Jelly in English versions; mad scientist and self-proclaimed master of the world), Ray Manta and the electric Torpedo Rays, the Fish Fry Gang, and Red Lobster (Colonel Klaw in English versions; German commander of the army of Black Crab).

== International presence ==
Sharky & George was dubbed into English, and broadcast on Channel 4, Sky Channel, The Children's Channel and Cartoon Network in the United Kingdom. It was also broadcast in Ireland on RTÉ Two, in France on Canal+, Antenne 2, FR3 and Canal J, in Serbia on RTV Politika, in Italy on Rai 1, Rai 2 and Telepace, in San Marino on San Marino RTV, in Malaysia on TV3, in Hungary on Magyar Televízió, in Poland on TVP1 (dubbed), in Singapore on Channel 5, in Spain on TVE and in Hong Kong on TVB Pearl. It was dubbed into Latin American Spanish and shown on RTP (now called TV Perú) in Peru, Megavisión (now called Mega) in Chile, and broadcast in other Latin American countries as well. In Canada, it aired on Canal Famille and on YTV and Showcase dubbed into English.

The show was also shown on SABC in South Africa, where it was broadcast in Afrikaans on television along with an English simulcast broadcast on radio. The English dub of the show also aired in South Africa where it aired on M-Net as part of their children's programming block K-T.V., and later on Bop TV in 2001 airing on its children's programming block Teeny Bop.

It was also broadcast on various Middle Eastern TV networks in Arabic, and is known as "Sharky wa George" in the Arab World.

== Home media ==
Four VHS cassettes were released in the late 1990s, but are now out of print.

A DVD containing ten episodes of the series was released in France in November 2005, but is no longer available.

== Voices ==
- A.J. Henderson - Sharky, Lox
- Paul Hawkins - George
- Ian Finlay
- Arthur Grosser - Dr. Jake Eel, Dr. Jelly
- Jane Woods - Sarah Prawn, Bella
- Pierre Lenoir
- Terrence Labrosse
- Pauline Little
- Teddy Lee Dillon
- Mark Hellman
- Mark Camacho - Scotia
- Dean Hagopian - Narrator, Colonel Klaw, Harry Flix, Marchello de Scampi, Fishy Ben Backstabber, Nova
- Paul Essiembre - Scotia, Marquis de Finsbury

== UK broadcast history ==
- Channel 4 (4 May 1991 – 29 December 1998)
- Sky Channel (1991–1996)
- The Children's Channel (1991–1995)
- Cartoon Network (1996–1998)
