= Castle in the Ground =

- Official poster
- Directed by: Joey Klein
- Written by: Joey Klein
- Produced by: Michael Solomon; William Woods
- Starring: Alex Wolff; Imogen Poots; Tom Cullen; Keir Gilchrist; Neve Campbell
- Cinematography: Bobby Shore
- Edited by: Jorge Weisz
- Music by: Chris Hyson
- Production companies: Woods Entertainment; Line 2000; Band With Pictures; Tip-Top Productions; Vigilante Productions; Telefilm Canada; Crave; Ontario Creative
- Distributed by: Pacific Northwest Pictures; Gravitas Ventures
- Release dates: September 5, 2019 (TIFF); May 15, 2020 (Canada); May 15, 2020 (United States)
- Running time: 105 minutes
- Countries: Canada; United States
- Language: English

Castle in the Ground is a 2019 Canadian-American drama film, written and directed by Joey Klein. The film explores a teenager's developing opioid addiction after the death of his terminally ill mother. It stars Alex Wolff, Imogen Poots, Tom Cullen, Keir Gilchrist and Neve Campbell.

It had its world premiere at the 2019 Toronto International Film Festival on September 5, 2019. It is scheduled to be released in the United States and Canada on May 15, 2020, by Gravitas Ventures and Pacific Northwest Pictures.

== Cast ==
- Alex Wolff as Henry Fine
- Imogen Poots as Ana
- Tom Cullen as Jimmy
- Kiowa Gordon as Stevie
- Keir Gilchrist as Polo Boy
- Neve Campbell as Rebecca Fine

== Production ==
In March 2019, it was announced Alex Wolff, Imogen Poots, Neve Campbell, Keir Gilchrist and Tom Cullen had joined the cast of the film, with Klein directing.

== Release ==
It had its world premiere at the 2019 Toronto International Film Festival on September 5, 2019. Shortly after, Gravitas Ventures acquired U.S. distribution rights to the film and set it for a May 15, 2020, release.

== Reception ==
On review aggregator website Rotten Tomatoes, the film holds an approval rating of 66% based on 38 reviews, with an average rating of 6.5/10.
