= Potatoes and Dragons =

- Created by: Jan Van Rijsselberge
- Directed by: Jean-Christophe Roger
- Voices of: Danny Wells; Mark Camacho; Mark Hauser; Annie Bovaird; Carrie Finlay; John Vamvas
- Theme music composer: Jeff Fisher
- Composers: Ray Fabi; Jeff Fisher
- Countries of origin: Canada; France; Germany; India; Luxembourg
- Original languages: French; English
- No. of seasons: 2
- No. of episodes: 26 (78 segments)

Production
- Executive producers: Christian Davin; Clément Calvet; Louis Fournier; Marc Gabizon
- Producers: Emanuelle Colin; Lesley Taylor; Ariane Payen
- Editors: Stéphane Masseline; Nathalie Loriod
- Running time: 22 minutes (7 minutes per segment)
- Production companies: Alphanim; Cookie Jar Entertainment (Note: Known as CINAR Corporation for season 1.) (Note: Produced as Potatoes and Dragons Productions Inc.); DQ Entertainment; LuxAnimation; Telepool(credited as Europool)

Original release
- Network: Canal J (France); France 3 (France); Teletoon (Canada)
- Release: January 5 – June 30, 2004

Potatoes and Dragons is an animated series created by Jan Van Rijsselberge for Canal J, France 3 and Teletoon and produced by Alphanim and CINAR Corporation (season 1)/Cookie Jar Entertainment (season 2) in association with DQ Entertainment, LuxAnimation and Europool. The series follows the efforts of a kingdom of potatoes led by King Hugo III to fend off the Dragon with usually unsuccessful results. It was formerly broadcast in the United States as a comedic cartoon until late September 2010 on This TV, it was also shown in the United Kingdom on ITV 1.

== Plot ==
The show generally begins with a new knight coming in to defeat the dragon, and after an amusing "battle" leaving either scared, running or happy.

== Characters ==
- King Hugo III – King Hugo III is the king of the land of the potatoes. He is easily upset, stubborn and hates the local dragon or anyone standing in his way or stopping things from going his way. He's almost never in a good mood, mostly because Dragon gives him a hard time with all his flaming whenever they meet, or if Hugo teases him and messes with his things; even when Hugo is minding his own business, and doing absolutely nothing, Dragon will still flame him anyway whether he likes/deserves it or not. He mistreats everyone, bossing them around so much (which makes them mad), and he's always getting mad at Harry and giving him a hard time whenever he fails and doesn't do his job right. Voiced by Danny Wells.
- Harry – Harry is King Hugo's torturer and right hand henchman. He tends to be absentminded and often does most of his worker's dirty work.
- Knights – In every episode a new knight, who ranges from a warrior to a scientist, appears and swears to slay or snare the dragon or make it domestic in some way, generally, in return for the hand of Melody the Princess or other forms of reward. They usually end up fighting against Hugo or being chased out of the kingdom.
- Melody – Melody, the blonde-haired princess, loves the dragon, and if anything happens to him, her love with Riri will end, so she thwarts plans to kill the dragon. Almost all knights offer to marry her, in which she either falls into a trance of joy or acts disgusted. She wears a pink gown and a crown that is smoother than the King Hugo's, Dragon has never flamed her because they're friends. Voiced by Carrie Finlay.
- Riri – Riri, the hero of the series, is the court jester, who loves Melody and thwarts plans to kill Dragon, he often teases Juju which makes him mad sometimes, Dragon has once flamed him by accident except he wasn't aiming for him, he was trying to aim for King Hugo and the knight. Voiced by Mark Hauser
- Juju – Juju is a child living in the castle who helps Riri, but is easily upset and moody, he likes pulling pranks and making fun of King Hugo just for fun, he's good friends with Dragon who he always tries helping, he teams up with Melody and Riri saving Dragon's life and avoiding King Hugo's ideas on kicking him out, Dragon has once flamed him by accident and got mad at him for ruining his favorite ball, but after while, he forgives him and they both become friends again, he knows Dragon didn't mean to hurt his feelings from before, because it happens. Voiced by Annie Bovaird
- Dragon – Dragon lives peacefully in the kingdom, but because he has a hatred of crowns finds himself uncontrollably willing to flame breathe Hugo into a pile of living ashes every time they meet, even when King Hugo is minding his own business, Dragon still has the plan to flame him anyway no matter what, even for nothing, whether he likes/deserves it or not, he can't talk, his voice is only heard when he's sighing, laughing, crying, yelling, screaming, and humming, his breath is always stinky whenever he spreads it around and flames someone, he would even sometimes be stinky himself. He often sometimes has a crush on a lady dragon almost known as his girlfriend, but he most likely loves being alone, he's good friends with Melody, Juju, and Riri whom he would never flame to ashes except maybe by accident, because they're all best friends and they try helping him whenever King Hugo has a plan of getting rid of him, he can even flame through pictures, ice, and the phone. Voiced by Mark Camacho
- Merlin – Merlin is the king's loyal practitioner of magic. This wizard's spells and potions usually don't work and they end up exploding in Hugo's face. Merlin frequently helps the princess, Riri and Juju to help save the dragon. Voiced by John Vamvas.
- Roger the Talking Carrot – Roger is a carrot that advises the knight on how to defeat the dragon. He has no other use to the story other than revealing the dragon's weaknesses, and perhaps a tasty snack if he upsets the knight.

== Episodes ==
=== Season 1 (2004) ===
No. overall	No. in season	Title	Written by
1	1	"Endangered Dragon"	Thomas Barichella
2	2	"Fried Green Potatoes"	Jean-François Henry; Jérôme Richebon
3	3	"Elementary, My Dear Dragon"	Michel Coulon
4	4	"An Elf in the Hand..."	Jean-Marc Bouzigues
5	5	"Hot Potato"	Philippe Thirault
6	6	"Ready Yeti?"	Jean-Marc Bouzigues
7	7	"Potato Bouquet"	Philippe Thirault
8	8	"King of the Potato Frontier"	Sébastien Dejardin
9	9	"Rose Party"	Sébastien Dejardin
10	10	"It Wasn't Me"	Sébastien Viaud
11	11	"Haunted Potatoes"	Julien Monthiel; Baptiste Heidrich
12	12	"Can't Get No Respect"	Michel Coulon
13	13	"Lady Ravage"	Françoise Boublil; Jean Helpert
14	14	"All in the Family"	Michel Coulon
15	15	"Mr. Croaky"	Jean-Marc Bouzigues
16	16	"His Majesty, the Dragon"	Philippe Thirault
17	17	"Crazy for Sale"	Michel Coulon
18	18	"Cool, Baby!"	Sébastien Viaud
19	19	"Agent Double-O-Nothing"	Sébastien Dejardin
20	20	"Potatoes Alfredo"	Julien Monthiel; Baptiste Heidrich
21	21	"G'Day Dragon"	Marc Larmigny
22	22	"Loch Ness Mess"	Sébastien Viaud
23	23	"Plastic Fantastic!"	Baptiste Heidrich
24	24	"Some Like It... Not Too Hot"	Sébastien Viaud
25	25	"The Tortures of Romance"	Sébastien Dejardin
26	26	"Closed for Construction"	Hadrien Soulez-Larvière
27	27	"Big Mama Torture"	Philippe Thirault
28	28	"Prehistoric Story"	Michel Coulon
29	29	"Being Stainless Isn't Painless"	Grégoire Delaage; Jérôme Richebon
30	30	"Yodel!"	Sébastien Viaud
31	31	"'Twas the Night Before Christmas"	Sébastien Dejardin; Jérôme Richebon
32	32	"Incoming Inca"	Sébastien Dejardin
33	33	"Summertime, and the Dragon Is Sleepy"	Isabelle de Catalogne
34	34	"One Froggy Knight"	Sébastien Dejardin
35	35	"Filthy Rich!"	Michel Coulon
36	36	"Business Scents"	Isabelle de Catalogne
37	37	"Trap Happy"	Jean-François Henry; Jérôme Richebon
38	38	"Here Today, Gondola Tomorrow"	Sébastien Viaud
39	39	"The Tooth, the Whole Tooth and Nothing But the Tooth"	Isabelle de Catalogne

=== Season 2 (2004) ===
No. overall	No. in season	Title	Written by
40	1	"Joust Kidding"	Julien Gard; Claude Gars; Jérôme Richebon
41	2	"Nostradumbo"	Sébastien Dejardin
42	3	"Deep-Sea Doodles"	Sébastien Dejardin
43	4	"That Was Zen, This Is Now"	Julien Monthiel; Baptiste Heidrich
44	5	"Flea at Last!"	Isabelle de Catalogne
45	6	"Un-Bear-Able"	Sébastien Viaud
46	7	"Blue Blunder"	Sébastien Dejardin
47	8	"Do Not Disturb!"	Hadrien Soulez-Larivière
48	9	"By the Skin of His Teeth"	Jacques E. Bouchard
49	10	"Dragon, Fly!"	Grégoire Delaage; Jérôme Richebon
50	11	"Robo-Flop"	Michel Coulon
51	12	"Naughty or Nice?"	Travis M. Williams
52	13	"Sir Lance-a-Lot"	Jacques E. Bouchard
53	14	"The Royal Portraits"	Stéphan Dubreuil
54	15	"The King and Aï"	Jacques E. Bouchard
55	16	"Roughing It"	Stéphan Dubreuil
56	17	"Mother Dearest"	Robert Foxman
57	18	"Enough with Eternity"	Stéphan Dubreuil
58	19	"The Curse"	Manon Berthelet; Muguette Berthelet
59	20	"Go Fish!"	Arthur Holden
60	21	"Bye Bye Birdie!"	Manon Berthelet; Muguette Berthelet
61	22	"Dinner Is Served"	Heidi Foss
62	23	"The Merman"	Travis M. Williams
63	24	"Ka-Boom!"	Arthur Holden
64	25	"The Substitute Ruler"	TBA
65	26	"Yee-hah!"	Manon Berthelet; Muguette Berthelet
66	27	"Be Prepared... for Dragons!"	Shelley Hoffman; Robert Pincombe
67	28	"Queen Cobra"	Stéphan Dubreuil
68	29	"Far from Heaven"	Sheila Dinsmore
69	30	"Corrida Del Dragon"	Stéphan Dubreuil
70	31	"En Garde!"	Manon Berthelet; Muguette Berthelet
71	32	"Lightning Romance"	Manon Berthelet; Muguette Berthelet
72	33	"The Treasure Map"	Jacques E. Bouchard
73	34	"Sir Jekyll and Sir Hyde"	Gerald Lewis
74	35	"Wham! Bam!"	Manon Berthelet; Muguette Berthelet
75	36	"The Mole"	Manon Berthelet; Muguette Berthelet
76	37	"Moby Dragon"	Jacques E. Bouchard
77	38	"King of the Jungle"	Jason Bogdaneris
78	39	"Tie Dye Dragon"	Jacques E. Bouchard
