= The Other Half (2016 film) =

2016 Canadian romantic drama film

- Directed by: Joey Klein
- Written by: Joey Klein
- Produced by: Nicole Hilliard-Forde; Jonathan Bronfman; Joey Klein
- Starring: Tatiana Maslany; Tom Cullen; Henry Czerny; Suzanne Clément
- Cinematography: Bobby Shore
- Edited by: James Vandewater
- Production companies: Motel Pictures; JoBro Productions
- Distributed by: Mongrel Media
- Release dates: March 12, 2016 (SXSW); December 2, 2016 (Canada)
- Running time: 103 minutes
- Country: Canada
- Language: English

The Other Half is a 2016 Canadian romantic drama film, written and directed by Joey Klein. It stars Tatiana Maslany, Tom Cullen, Henry Czerny, and Suzanne Clément. The film had its world premiere at South by Southwest on 12 March 2016.

== Premise ==
A bipolar woman and grief-stricken man struggle to live a simple life.

== Cast ==
- Tatiana Maslany as Emily
- Tom Cullen as Nickie
- Henry Czerny as Jacob
- Suzanne Clément as Marie
- Mark Rendall as Sammy
- Diana Bentley as Kristin
- Deragh Campbell as Anna
- Nancy Palk as Katherine
- Kaleb Alexander as Johnny
- Zachary Hillard-Forde as Tommy
- Emmanuel Kabongo as Officer James

== Production ==
In July 2015, it was revealed that Joey Klein would write and direct the film, with Tatiana Maslany, Tom Cullen, Suzanne Clément, Deragh Campbell, and Mark Rendall starring in the film.

== Release ==
The film had its world premiere at South by Southwest on 12 March 2016. Mongrel Media distributed the film in Canada, releasing it on 2 December 2016.

== Reception ==
The film received mostly positive critical reviews. On the review aggregator website Rotten Tomatoes, 78% of 18 critics' reviews are positive, with an average rating of 6.9/10. Metacritic, which uses a weighted average, assigned the film a score of 60 out of 100, based on 9 critics, indicating "mixed or average" reviews.

The Los Angeles Times said that the film is "a granular depiction of trauma, illness and protectiveness disguised as a love story and guided by a pair of intense portrayals", and that, "as it plays out, it’s only a hard road for these swept-up, damaged lovers, whom Klein and his actors treat with blessedly non-exploitative honesty." Variety wrote, "What might have seemed pro forma on paper overcomes its occasionally studied stylistic tics to become a troubled, anguished love story that neither exaggerates nor soft-pedals the demons on display."

The Toronto Star praised Klein, saying that he "creates a mood of tension, foreboding and sombre reflection through occasional moments of slo-mo and camera work that blurs reality. His literate script offers no easy resolution, only the faint hope that love can rescue two lost souls."
