= Joey Klein =

Canadian actor and film director

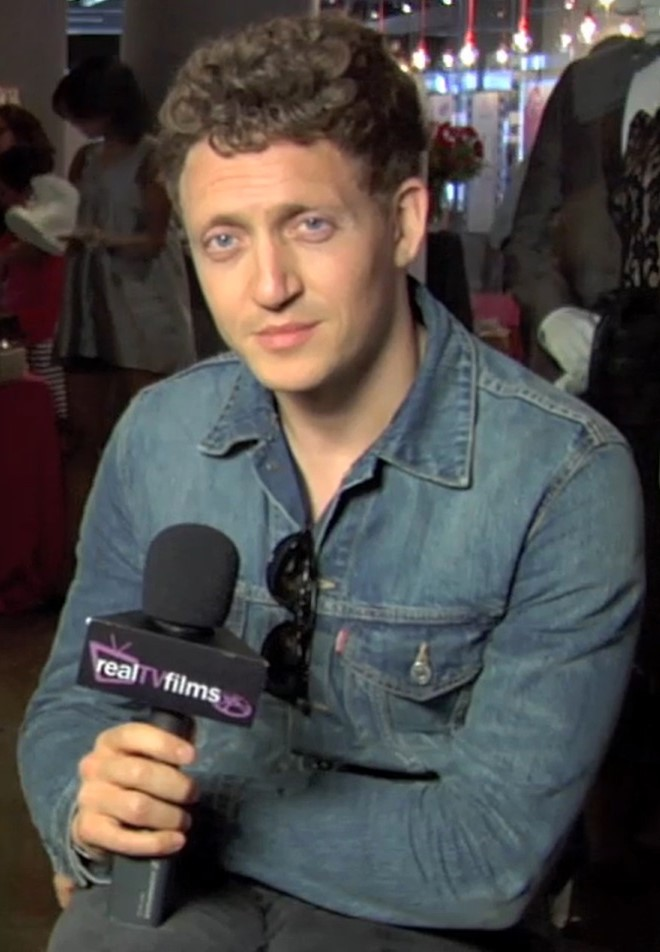
Klein at the 2013 Toronto International Film Festival

Joey Klein is a Canadian actor and film director. He is most noted for his performance in the 2016 film We're Still Together, for which he won the ACTRA Award for Best Actor from the ACTRA Awards chapter in Toronto and received a Prix Iris nomination for Best Actor at the 20th Quebec Cinema Awards.

His other acting roles have included the films The Girl in the White Coat, New York Minute, The Animal Project, What Keeps You Alive and Through Black Spruce, and the television series 12 Monkeys and This Life.

As a film director, his feature debut The Other Half was released in 2016. His second feature film, Castle in the Ground, premiered at the 2019 Toronto International Film Festival.

His brother Jesse is also a filmmaker, who was the writer and director of We're Still Together.

== Filmography ==
=== Film ===
Year	Title	Role	Notes
2004	New York Minute	Truant at Pool	
2007	Liar's Pendulum	Czar Lazarus	
2007	American Gangster	Chemist	
2009	The Waterhole	Cracker	
2009	Cry	Duff	
2011	The Girl in the White Coat	Sterling	
2012	The Vow	Josh	
2012	On the Road	Tom Saybrook	
2013	White House Down	TV Producer	Uncredited
2013	The Husband	Les	
2013	The Animal Project	Saul	
2016	We're Still Together	Bobby	
2017	Painless	Henry Long	
2018	What Keeps You Alive	Daniel	
2018	Through Black Spruce	Danny	

Year	Title	Director	Writer	Producer	Notes
2016	The Other Half	Yes	Yes	Yes	
2019	Castle in the Ground	Yes	Yes	No	

=== Television ===
Year	Title	Role	Notes
2011	Good Dog	Rabbi	Episode: "Converting to Judaism"
2011	Haven	TJ Smith	Episode: "A Tale of Two Audreys"
2012	Murdoch Mysteries	Harlan O'Brian	Episode: "Invention Convention"
2012	Willed to Kill	Floyd	Television film
2015–2016	This Life	Dr. Jonathan Lyle	5 episodes
2016	12 Monkeys	Charlie	2 episodes
2021	In the Dark	Redford Long	4 episodes
