= Kidnap Capital =

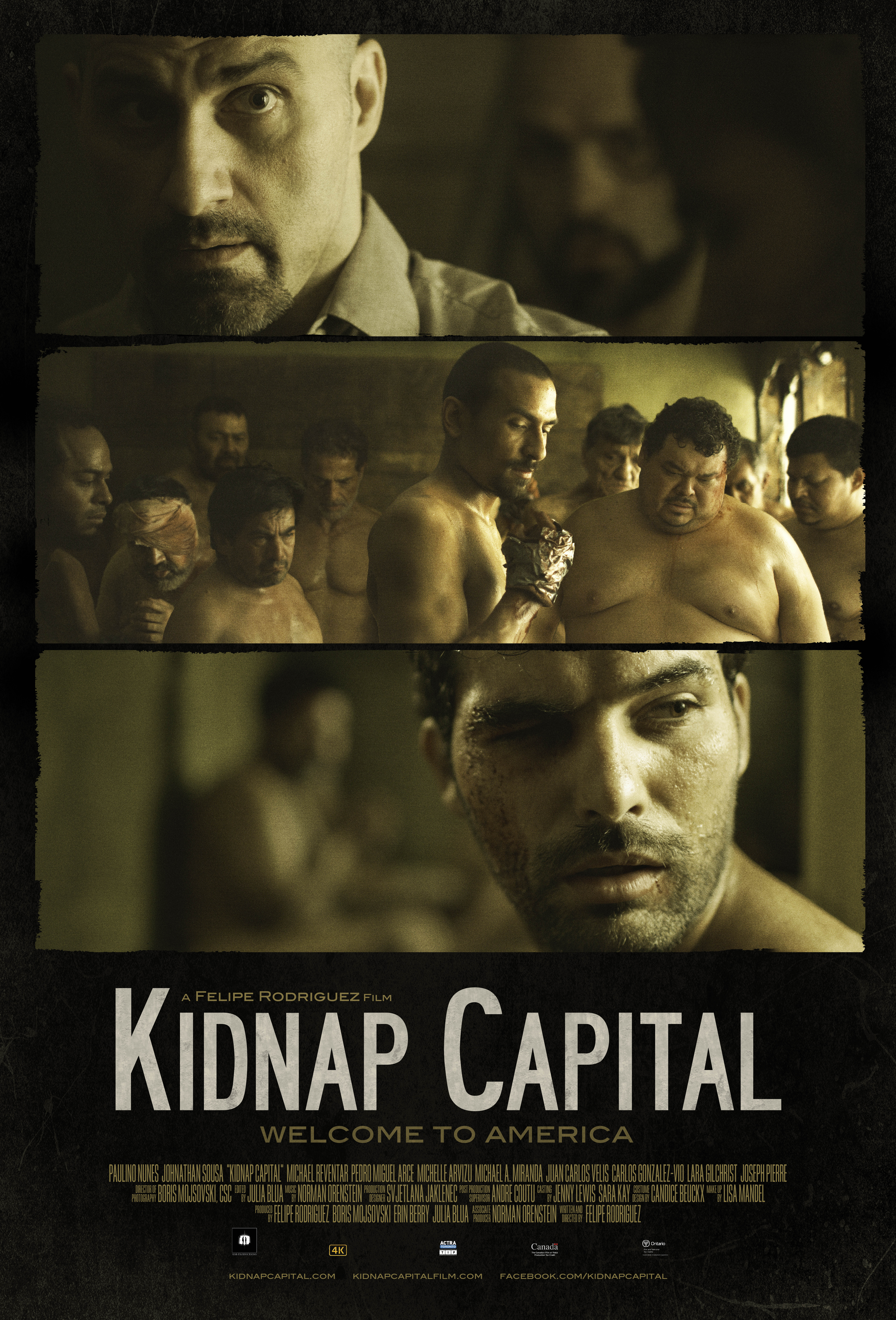
- Directed by: Felipe Rodriguez
- Written by: Felipe Rodriguez
- Produced by: Felipe Rodriguez, Boris Mojsovski, Baxter Merry, Julia Blua, Erin Berry
- Starring: Paulino Nunes; Johnathan Sousa; Michael Reventar; Pedro Miguel Arce; Michelle Arvizu
- Cinematography: Boris Mojsovski
- Edited by: Julia Blua
- Music by: Norman Orenstein
- Release date: June 17, 2015 (Shanghai International Film Festival)
- Running time: 93 minutes
- Country: Canada
- Language: English

Kidnap Capital is a 2015 Canadian crime drama film, released in Canada in 2016. The directorial debut of Felipe Rodriguez, the film centres on a group of undocumented migrants who have been kidnapped by a Phoenix street gang and are being held for ransom in a drop house in Arizona.

The film's cast includes Paulino Nunes, Johnathan Sousa, Michael Reventar, Michelle Arvizu and Pedro Miguel Arce.

The film was a finalist for Best Picture and Best Director at the 2016 Imagen Awards. It won several awards on the festival circuit, including the "Chairman's Award" at the San Diego Film Festival, "Best Non-European Film" at ECU the European Independent Film Festival in Paris, the "Jury's Special Mention" at the BOGOCINE Bogota Film Festival, and many others.

At the 5th Canadian Screen Awards in 2017, Michael Reventar was a nominee for Best Supporting Actor.
