= Kirsten Carthew =

Canadian film director

Kirsten Carthew is a Canadian film director, producer and screenwriter from Yellowknife, Northwest Territories.

Carthew made a number of short films, most notably Fish Out of Water in 2015, before releasing her debut feature film, The Sun at Midnight, in 2016. Her second feature film, Polaris, went into production in 2021, and was released in 2022.

In 2018, she was one of eight women filmmakers selected for the Academy of Canadian Cinema and Television's Apprenticeship for Women Directors program, alongside Kathleen Hepburn, Tiffany Hsiung, Alicia K. Harris, Allison White, Asia Youngman, Halima Ouardiri, and Kristina Wagenbauer.
