= Duane Howard =

Canadian actor (born 1963)

- Born: 1963 (age 62–63); Esperanza Inlet, British Columbia, Canada
- Citizenship: Canadian
- Occupation: Actor

Duane Howard (born 1963) is an Aboriginal Canadian actor who is best known for his role as the Arikara chief Elk Dog in the 2015 film The Revenant. He has also appeared in Bury My Heart at Wounded Knee (2007), Pathfinder (2007), the television series Godless (2017), The Sun at Midnight (2016) and other films.

== Early years ==
Howard was born in the Esperanza Inlet, located on the west coast of Vancouver Island in British Columbia, Canada. He is Nuu-chah-nulth. He spent his early childhood in Port Alberni and moved to Vancouver at the age of 14. At age 23, Howard conquered a drug and alcohol addiction and began working as a substance abuse counselor with at-risk youth in Vancouver.

== Acting career ==
A chance meeting with a local talent agent in Vancouver in the early 1990s resulted in walk-on roles in the X-Files, Smallville and Supernatural, then to feature roles. Howard has also worked as a stuntman and performed his own stunts for his role in The Revenant. In media interviews, Howard has said his own experience with loss and hardship informed his portrayal of Elk Dog, a father whose daughter is kidnapped by fur trappers. When Leonardo DiCaprio dedicated his Golden Globe Award for The Revenant to indigenous communities around the world, Howard said he was moved by the speech, and hopes to see more accurate portrayals of Indigenous culture come out of Hollywood.

== Speaking activities ==
Following his role as Elk Dog, Howard began traveling and speaking about his own experiences to raise awareness about substance abuse, suicide and other issues in indigenous communities. After a state of emergency was declared in Attawapiskat First Nation in April 2016 because of its high rate of suicide, Howard told an interviewer, "People are saying we've got to help our young people, but it takes a community to come together as one. And there's a saying: one heart, one mind, one prayer, we can all move forward."

== Awards and nominations ==
Year	Award	Category	Work	Result	Ref
2017	Leo Awards	Best Lead Performance by a Male in a Motion Picture	The Sun at Midnight	Nominated	
