= The Sun at Midnight =

2016 Canadian drama film directed by Kirsten Carthew

- Film poster
- Directed by: Kirsten Carthew
- Written by: Kirsten Carthew
- Produced by: Kirsten Carthew; Amos Scott
- Starring: Duane Howard; Kawennáhere Devery Jacobs
- Cinematography: Ian MacDougall
- Edited by: Jamie Alain
- Music by: Rich Walters
- Production companies: Jill and Jackfish Productions
- Distributed by: Industry Works Pictures; Monterey Media
- Release date: September 25, 2016
- Running time: 93 minutes
- Country: Canada
- Language: English

The Sun at Midnight is a Canadian drama film, directed by Kirsten Carthew and released in 2016. The film stars Duane Howard as Alfred, a caribou hunter in the Canadian Arctic who befriends Lia (Kawennáhere Devery Jacobs), a rebellious teenager who has been sent to the area to live with her grandmother following the death of her mother.

The film was shot in 2015 in Yellowknife and Fort McPherson, Northwest Territories. It premiered on September 25, 2016 in Fort McPherson, before going on to screenings on the film festival circuit. It did not receive widespread commercial distribution in Canada, but instead was broadcast by HBO Canada; in 2018, it was picked up for American theatrical distribution by Monterey Media.

== Awards ==
Jacobs won the Borsos Competition award for Best Performance in a Canadian Film at the 2016 Whistler Film Festival, and the award for Best Actress at the 2017 American Indian Film Festival.

The film won the award for Best Narrative Film at the Bentonville Film Festival in 2017. It won two Leo Awards in 2017, for Best Picture Editing (Jamie Alain) and Best Musical Score (Rich Walters).
