= Michael Reventar =

Canadian actor

- Born: Scarborough, Toronto, Ontario, Canada
- Occupation: Actor
- Awards: Best Supporting Actor

Michael Reventar is a Canadian actor. He is best known for his appearance as Farooq Gibran / Blackout in The Flash, and for the film Kidnap Capital, for which he received a Canadian Screen Award nomination as Best Supporting Actor at the 5th Canadian Screen Awards.

== Early life ==
Reventar was born in Scarborough, Toronto, Ontario.

== Career ==
Reventar began his acting career with guest appearances in television series such as "Alphas", "Nikita", "Flashpoint", and "Beauty & the Beast". He gained wider recognition in 2014 for portraying Farooq Gibran / Blackout in the first season of "The Flash".

== Filmography ==
=== Film ===
Year	Title	Role	Notes
2015	Kidnap Capital	Rico	
2018	Peppermint	Ortega	
2018	I'll Take Your Dead	Diaz	

=== Television ===
Year	Title	Role	Notes
2009	Curious and Unusual Deaths	Detective	Episode: "Shotgun House"
2011	Dual Suspects	Juan Luna	Episode: "Seven in the Cooler"
2011	Alphas	Alonso	Episode: "Bill and Gary's Excellent Adventure"
2011	Against the Wall	Gus Meroni	Episode: "Second Chances"
2012	Nikita	Terrence	Episode: "Power"
2012	King	Little Billy	Episode: "Jared and Stacy Cooper"
2012	Transporter: The Series	Rene Dugas	Episode: "Harvest"
2012	Beauty & the Beast	Julio Ramirez	Episode: "Proceed with Caution"
2012	Flashpoint	Marshall	Episode: "Forget Oblivion"
2012	Prosecuting Casey Anthony	Ricardo Morales	Television film
2012, 2015	Air Crash Investigation	Various roles	2 episodes
2013	Played	Gavin Schwab	Episode: "Fights"
2014	24 Hour Rental	Malverde	Episode: "Don of the Dead"
2014	The Flash	Farooq Gibran / Blackout	Episode: "Power Outage"
2015	Gangland Undercover	Thor	Episode: "Solitary"
2015	Between	Hector	Episode: "School's Out"
2015–2016	The Art of More	Miguel Araujo	5 episodes
2017	Dark Matter	Ash	2 episodes
2017	The Strain	Raul	3 episodes
2017	Wisdom of the Crowd	Flaco	Episode: "Pilot"
2018	2nd Generation	Officer Kent	2 episodes
2018	Impulse	Luis Castillo	4 episodes
2018	The Mission	Baby Joker	Television film
2019	Hudson & Rex	Clive	2 episodes
2019	Titans	Carlos	Episode: "Fallen"
2021	See	Lord Diego	3 episodes
2021	Mayor of Kingstown	Alberto	Episode: "The Mayor of Kingstown"
