= Benjamin Ross Hayden =

Canadian film director, writer, producer, and actor

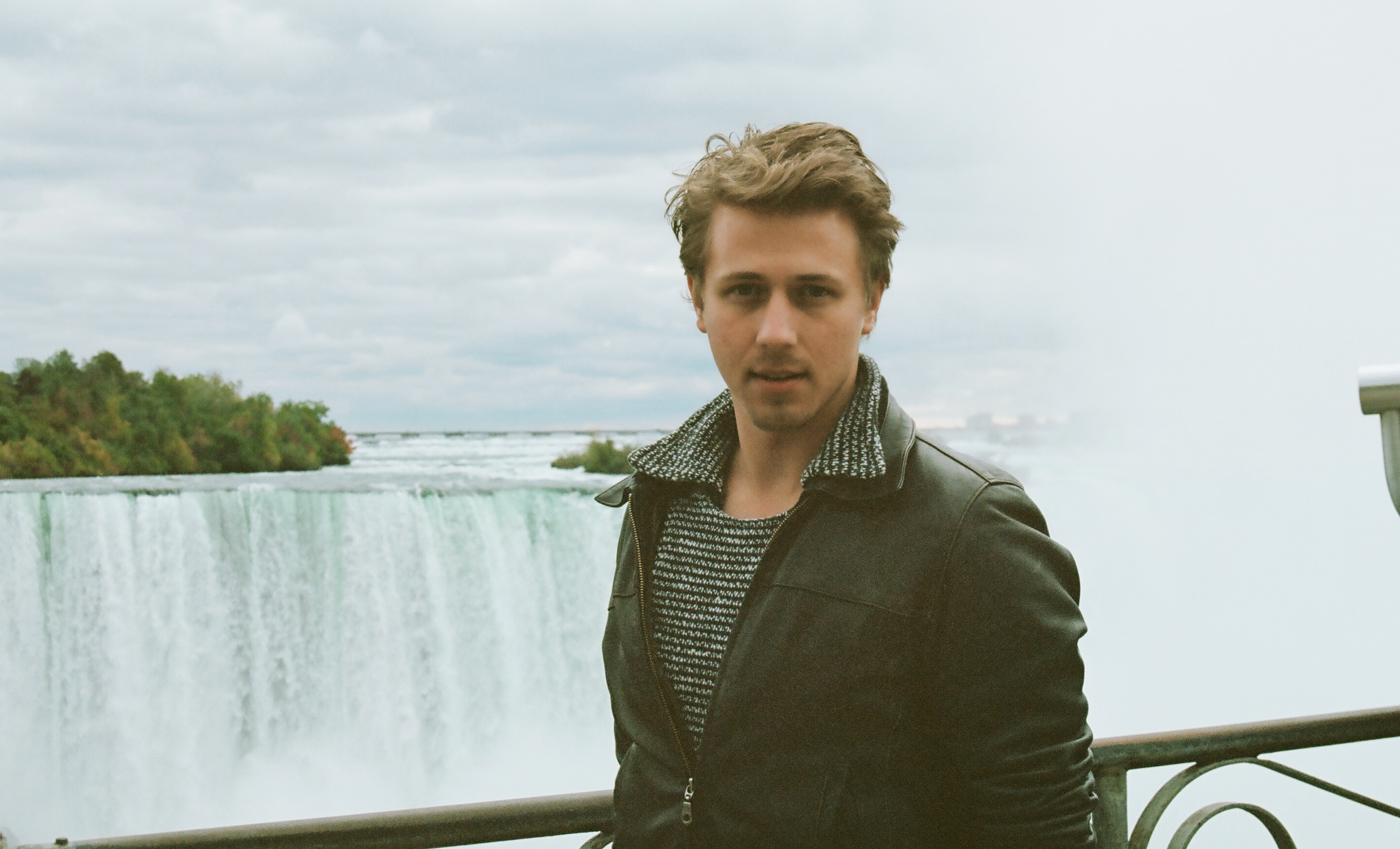
- Born: April 29, 1989 (age 36); Calgary, Alberta, Canada
- Occupation(s): Filmmaker, actor
- Years active: 2010–present
- Notable work: The Northlander

Benjamin Ross Hayden (born 29 April 1989) is a Métis Canadian film director, writer, producer, and actor. His debut feature film, The Northlander, was the first ever Telefilm Canada micro-budget selected for Perspective Canada program at the Cannes Film Festival, and premiered at the 40th Montreal World Film Festival in 2016. The film received a wide theatrical release in Canada during fall 2016. He is also the youngest film director in Canada to be accepted into the Telefilm micro-budget program, and from that is the only film director to ever to receive a theatrical release in Landmark Cinemas.

== Early life and education ==
Hayden was born and raised in Calgary, Alberta. He began making films while attending the University of Calgary and SAIT Polytechnic in his teenage years and early 20s. After being awarded a Bachelor of Film Studies Degree and Diploma (BFS), in 2015 he established Manifold Pictures. Hayden developed in partnership with the Adam Beach Film Institute in Winnipeg, Manitoba, and acted as the chairman of Film & Video Advisory at SAIT Polytechnic in 2016.

== Career ==
=== Filmmaker ===
Benjamin Ross Hayden is the founder of Manifold Pictures. Through Manifold Pictures, Hayden has focused on producing film and video, and has created award-winning works that have screened at major international festivals, including The 40th Montreal World Film Festival, Sitges Film Festival of Catalonia, and the imagineNATIVE International Film Festival. Hayden's recent films have portrayed indigenous futurism narratives concerned with Métis history, humanity's impact on planet earth, and interpreting Canadian history as mythology by using Alberta as a backdrop for futuristic narratives. Benjamin Ross Hayden won the award for Best Screenwriter at the 40th Alberta Film & Television Awards. Following the announcement that his first feature film The Northlander would be funded by Telefilm Canada, he received a distribution deal with Raven Banner Releasing, and with Spotlight Pictures as international agents. Benjamin's breakout medium length science fiction Agophobia (2013) is preserved in the national archives of National Cinematheque of Mexico City.

=== Actor ===
Hayden played the supporting lead role of Peter Bowden in Dalmatian Coast Productions debut feature film Kept written & directed by Krunoslav Malnar. The film premiered at the Calgary International Film Festival in 2012.

== Filmography ==
- Pick (2010)
- Trobia (2012)
- Agophobia (2013)
- The Edict (2014)
- The Northlander (2015)
- Parallel Minds (2020)
