= We're Still Together =

- Directed by: Jesse Noah Klein
- Written by: Jesse Noah Klein
- Produced by: Evren Boisjoli; Marley Sniatowsky
- Starring: Jesse Camacho; Joey Klein
- Cinematography: Pawel Pogorzelski
- Edited by: James Codoyannis; Jesse Noah Klein
- Music by: Alex Zhang Hungtai
- Production companies: Achromatic Media; Les Cousins Dangereux
- Release date: September 7, 2016 (Karlovy Vary)
- Running time: 82 minutes
- Country: Canada
- Language: English

We're Still Together is a 2016 Canadian drama film, written and directed by Jesse Noah Klein. The film stars Jesse Camacho as Chris, a shy young man who gets taken under the wing of the more outgoing Bobby (Joey Klein) when they meet outside a Montreal Metro station after Chris has been attacked by a bully.

Director Jesse Klein is the brother of Joey Klein, and wrote the film specifically for his brother on the grounds that he felt Joey had not yet had the chance to play a role that showed off his full acting range.

The film premiered at the Karlovy Vary Film Festival in 2016, and had its commercial premiere in 2017.

Camacho won the award for Best Actor from the Montreal chapter of the ACTRA Awards, Klein won the award for Best Actor from the ACTRA Awards chapter in Toronto, and both actors received Prix Iris nominations for Best Actor at the 20th Quebec Cinema Awards.

== Cast ==
- Jesse Camacho as Chris
- Joey Klein as Bobby
- Brielle Robillard as Oliva
- Eve Harlow as Clarie
- Diana Bentley as Emily
- Alex Weiner as Jeremy
