= Just a Walk in the Park =

2002 television film

Just a Walk in the Park is a television film starring George Eads and Jane Krakowski. It premiered on ABC Family in 2002. It was directed by Steven Schachter.

== Plot ==
When a dog walker agrees to housesit for a wealthy client with a penthouse apartment, he is mistaken for the apartment's owner by a dog-loving neighbor.

== Cast ==
- George Eads as Adam Willingford
- Jane Krakowski as Rachel Morgan
- Richard Robitaille as A.J. Preston
