= Fennec (TV series) =

French animated series

- Genre: Cartoon series
- Directed by: Raymond LeBrun; Philippe Vidal
- Country of origin: France
- Original languages: French; English
- No. of seasons: 1
- No. of episodes: 26

Production
- Running time: 26 minutes
- Production companies: Ellipsanime; France 3 Motion International; Shaw Media

Original release
- Release: October 13, 1997

Fennec is a French animated television series, about a Fennec fox of the same name who solves little mysteries in the peaceful town of Chewington. The series was based on the book collection "Pickpocket" written by Alexis Lecaye and published by Gallimard.

The series aired in France on France 3, IDF1 and Playhouse Disney, in Belgium on Ketnet and K-T.V., in the Netherlands on Yorkiddin and K-T.V., in Spain on Fox Kids, in Brazil on SBT and in Scandinavia on K-T.V.

== Episodes ==
| No. | Title | Original release date |
|---|---|---|
| 1 | "Flons-flons in Croquiville / Gare in Gary" | TBA |
| 2 | "Fennec loses the game / The great labyrinth" | TBA |
| 3 | "The great Basilouni / Lola-Lola" | TBA |
| 4 | "Scratching at Croquiville / La chance tourne" | TBA |
| 5 | "Le grand manitou / Funny smell in Croquiville" | TBA |
| 6 | "Fennec is in love / Attention, fresh paint!" | TBA |
| 7 | "Fennec vs the invisible / The counterfeiters" | TBA |
| 8 | "Gary and company / Vote Basil Brutal!" | TBA |
| 9 | "Atchoum, atchoum and atchoum! / Chills in Croquiville" | TBA |
| 10 | "Chkoyoff / The flight of the Lola-Lisa" | TBA |
| 11 | "The Crash Course / Super-Jacky" | TBA |
| 12 | "We stole Fennec / Where did Friss go?" | TBA |
| 13 | "Window on pastry / We turn to Croquiville" | TBA |
| 14 | "Diva the divine / The flight of the century" | TBA |
| 15 | "Agathe / Special Edition" | TBA |
| 16 | "Chocolate / The nine lives of Gary" | TBA |
| 17 | "Gary and the Martians" | TBA |
| 18 | "Chris's cousin / The treasure of the square" | TBA |
| 19 | "The Super Piggy Bank / Little Night Music" | TBA |
| 20 | "The costume of Fenlock Holmes / On track!" | TBA |
| 21 | "The big bubble bath / A gold letter carrier" | TBA |
| 22 | "The law of silence / The mysterious night bird" | TBA |
| 23 | "Leo Biscotto / Nina" | TBA |
| 24 | "Gary's Christmas / The Georges Gros Dos Case" | TBA |
| 25 | "Aunt Ratussa / 0014" | TBA |
| 26 | "Four Arm Surveys / In the Name of the Law" | TBA |
