= Fred the Caveman =

1999 animated series

- Genre: Animation; Children; Comedy
- Countries of origin: France; Canada
- No. of seasons: 1
- No. of episodes: 39

Production
- Running time: 7 minutes

Original release
- Network: Teletoon
- Release: January 1, 1999 – November 1, 2002

Fred the Caveman (French-language title Fred des Cavernes) is an animated series about the misadventures of the titular caveman. The show was produced by Antefilms and Tube Studios, and consists of a single season of 13 episodes, or 39 shorts of about 7 minutes each.

It was first shown on Teletoon in Canada on September 2, 2002, with the final episode airing on November 1, 2002. In France, it aired on Télétoon and M6, with the former channel being involved in production as early as 1999.
