= Creepschool =

- Genre: Fantasy; Horror
- Created by: Torbjörn Jansson; Happy Life
- Developed by: Stina Mansfield; Per Carlsson; Han Östlundh
- Written by: Stina Mansfelt; Per Carlsson
- Directed by: Philippe Balmossière
- Voices of: Sonja Ball; Kayla Grunfeld; Jesse Camacho; Jesse Vinet; Richard Dumont; Annie Bovaird; Richard Jutras
- Opening theme: "Creepschool"
- Ending theme: "Creepschool" (instrumental)
- Composer: AudioType
- Countries of origin: France; Canada; Sweden; Germany; China; Luxembourg
- Original language: English
- No. of seasons: 1
- No. of episodes: 26

Production
- Executive producers: Christian Davin; Clément Calvet; Peter Gustafsson; Louis Fournier
- Producers: Emanuelle Colin; Lesley Taylor
- Running time: 23 minutes
- Production companies: Alphanim; CINAR Corporation/Cookie Jar Entertainment; Happy Life; EM.TV & Merchadising AG; Agogo Media; LuxAnimation

Original release
- Network: France 3 (France); KiKA (Germany); Teletoon/Télétoon (Canada)
- Release: March 13 – June 23, 2004

Creepschool is an animated series created by Torbjörn Jansson and Happy Life, developed by Stina Mansfield, Per Carlsson and Han Östlundh and produced by Alphanim, CINAR Corporation/Cookie Jar Entertainment and Happy Life in association with EM.TV & Merchandising AG, Agogo Media and LuxAnimation for France 3, RTP2, Teletoon and ZDF about four kids who find themselves at a spooky boarding school. The basic concept was created by Torbjörn Jansson, which was then substantially re-worked and developed by the co-head writers Kristina Mansfeld and Per Carlsson into the series it is today. They also wrote all the storylines. 26 episodes were produced. Creepschool has been compared to Gravedale High. This was the last television series produced by CINAR before it was rebranded as Cookie Jar Entertainment.

== Plot ==
When four unsuspecting kids attend a remote, sinister-looking boarding school which is known as the Creepschool, they embark on an adventure into the fascinating, supernatural world. Imagine nightmares in your so called "Natural" life. Elliot, Josh, Janice and Victoria also share our everyday problems and… More! Who Says School Is Boring?

== Characters ==
- Mr. Malcolm
- Miss Dorothy
- Mr. Edgar
- Gilbert
- Tony
- Gertrude
- Brigita
- Master
- Elliot
- Janice
- Josh
- Victoria
- Elsa
- Elvira
- Jasper
- Toby
- Bob

== Episodes ==
No.	Title	Original release date
1	"Welcome to Creepschool"	March 13, 2004
The four kids arrive at Creepschool for the first time. Victoria is kidnapped by a shadow and ends up all alone in a bizarre white, featureless dimension with only her own echo for company. It turns out that her echo has a mind of its own and confronts Victoria with her deepest insecurity, namely that no one, least of all her parents, really cares about her. The others go looking for her, and with the help of some of their new Creepschool friends and particularly Demon Dog, they rescue Victoria. The whole experience brings the kids closer together and helps them decide to stay.
2	"Just Joshing"	March 14, 2004
On the way to class, Josh takes a shortcut with Elliot and they end up in a strange room they've never seen before. Despite a warning sign, Josh pulls out a plug in the floor letting loose an army of mischievous imps who immediately rush off and start causing major problems for Creepschool. What's more, only the person who released the imps can plug them back in. Josh blames the whole thing on a monster he makes up. Being Creepschool, however, the monster Josh imagined comes to life and kidnaps him and Elliot before they have a chance to tell Malcolm what really happened. Finding themselves in a black void, things look very dark for the two boys. Soon Elliot works out that they are in fact imprisoned in Josh's own imagination- Josh merely has to imagine a way out and hey presto, there it is. They escape and with Malcolm's help manage to put every last imp back in the hole. But what about the monster?
3	"Wish of the Garbo"	March 15, 2004
Janice is in a bad mood, people keep disturbing her. While reading an enchanted book of the Garbo that grants your innermost desires, Janice screams out, "leave me alone," and suddenly finds herself truly on her own - she has all of Creepschool to herself. First she enjoys doing exactly as she pleases without anyone interfering. After a while, however, she begins to feel lonely. To her surprise she discovers that she isn't actually alone. She meets a very bad-tempered old lady, who's been alone for so long she doesn't remember her name. Eventually it is revealed that the crabby old lady is actually Janice as she would become if she spends her life on her own. As she rushes off in search for other people, Janice discovers that she isn't in the real Creepschool, but a miniature model inside a snow globe. Elliot, who has been searching for Janice, sees her inside the globe. Wishing he could help her get out, the Garbo grants his wish, and Janice is reunited with her friends.
4	"Tricks That Treat"	March 16, 2004
It's almost Halloween. Assuming that Principal Malcolm doesn't know what Halloween is, they offer to teach Creepschool what Halloween is all about by throwing a party for all the monsters. In their search for costumes, the kids come across an armoire full of great costumes they can use for the party. Just after the party starts, a terrible storm breaks out and the lights go out. The guests cry out and when the lights come back on, everyone has vanished except for the four kids. Believing their friends to be in danger, the kids set off looking for them. They soon discover that they cannot remove their costumes, that they have in fact become what they got dressed up as. This comes in handy, however, as they need the powers that come with their new identities in order to overcome the obstacles they come across along the way. In the end it turns out that the monsters were playing a trick on them- in fact, they invented Halloween so there would be one day in the year when the monsters could walk around the city without having to wear disguises.
5	"Goal Keeper"	March 17, 2004
Elliot is depressed; everyone else seems to know exactly what they want out of life, but he has no idea. Master suggests he go to the Chamber of Goals and try out a few dreams to see if anything takes his fancy. Elliot does so and finds a room full of empty picture frames. Whenever he hangs one on the wall, a specific goal appears that Elliot then gets to experience once he leaves the room. He has a great time trying them all out, but then notices that everyone at Creepschool is slowly fading. It turns out that by trying out all the dreams he's been robbing others of their dreams, without which they cease to exist. Eventually even Creepschool itself fades away. Elliot pleads with the Goal Keeper to bring his friends back. The Goal Keeper agrees but wants Elliot's deepest, most cherished desire in return- his true love for Janice. Elliot has no choice- he agrees and is reunited with his friends.
6	"Cool Clay"	March 18, 2004
While goofing off in science class, Josh creates a concoction that explodes, covering the classroom and his classmates in yellow goop. Forced to clean it all up after class, Josh is amazed to see the goop form itself into a perfect, living copy of himself. What's better is that his double does anything Josh tells him to do, and is better at everything than he is, in fact he's very good at everything. At first this is a godsend- Josh gets to stay in his room all day playing video games, while his copy goes to class for him- Josh has never gotten such good grades before. In fact, the double is better than Josh at everything, including impressing the girls. Gradually, his double starts acting on his own and showing megalomaniacal tendencies. Tired of doing Josh's bidding he imprisons Josh, and Elliot too. Eventually, the girls uncover the truth and manage to trick the double at his moment of triumph. They throw water on him, melting him back into a pile of goop.
7	"The Secret of the Well"	March 19, 2004
Elliot is chatting in the graveyard with his pal Master, who is telling him stories from his childhood. He tells him what a terror he was, how he once accidentally discovered how to get the Screaming Meemie to leave its lair at the bottom of the well- a feat nobody has pulled off before or since. Elliot wishes he could have known Master as a boy, whereupon Master gives him an undeveloped picture of himself, the only one ever taken. While trying to develop it, Elliot accidentally spills some strange fluid onto it, but being late for class, hangs it up to dry and rushes off. As the picture develops we see that the figure is missing from the image. In class the children are divided up into two teams and told to go out taking pictures of rare creatures- the rarer the creature the more points for the team. Suddenly a new student, Augustus, appears out of nowhere, and ends up on Elliot's team. Elliot's team is losing miserably, and Augustus is constantly getting them into trouble, particularly with Master, who dislikes the boy intensely right from the start. Soon Elliot's team realizes that they cannot win- no creature is rare enough for them to be able to catch up& except the Screaming Meemie. Going for broke they try to find a way to get the Meemies to come out so they can take a picture. Nothing works until Augustus discovers it by mistake. They rush off with the picture and win the competition, but Augustus fades away before their very eyes. Seeing the picture hanging in the dark room, we see the figure has returned- it was Augustus. He was Master as a child.
8	"Frame-Up"	March 20, 2004
Victoria is fuming over the lack of organization at Creepschool; things aren't properly maintained, the schedule is impossible to understand, and nobody ever does any cleaning. Catching sight of a portrait hanging at a slant, Victoria straightens it, and is immediately met by the gushing gratitude of the subject, thankful to finally be hanging straight. He rewards Victoria by giving her four wishes. Wasting the first one just to see if it really works, Victoria then wishes she were principal, so she could take care of some of the many problems she was so worked up over. Once she is principal, however, power goes to her head and she quickly discovers that running a school is harder than she realized. The problems escalate until the school is in total chaos and the students and faculty up in arms. Eventually, she is forced to use up her wishes to avert disaster, using her last one to wish things back the way they were. The only problem is that her friends remember how she treated them when she was principal, and forgiveness doesn't come easy.
9	"Laughing Stock"	March 21, 2004
Elliot feels uncomfortable in his skin; why can't he be more outgoing and spontaneous, or tell jokes that make people laugh, like Josh does? This weighs particularly heavily on his mind as he perceives these qualities to be the kind that Janice enjoys. He finds a cool-looking jacket that makes him feel very slick and confident whenever he puts it on. In fact, it changes his whole persona, turning him into a scathingly sarcastic, fast talking comedian. At first, everyone is impressed by the sudden change in Elliot, but his put-downs are so harsh that his friends begin to resent him, particularly Josh, whom he humiliates when he steals the MC spot that Josh had his heart set on right from under his nose. Elliot, saddened by what the coat makes him say to his friends, and terrified he'll end up saying something nasty to Janice, tries desperately to remove the jacket, but it's too strong. When he finally finds himself face-to-face with Janice, with a perfect chance to fire off a put-down as she has just ruined her hair preparing for the talent contest, Elliot ends up in a final life-and-death struggle with the jacket. Elliot wins and the jacket comes off, all just in time for the talent show. Without the help of the jacket Elliot is terrified about going on stage and pleads with Josh to forgive him and take the MC job he so richly deserved. Josh agrees and Janice consoles Elliot, assuring him that they like him just the way he is.
10	"The Disappearance of Professor Samsa"	March 28, 2004
While searching for an interesting topic for an essay assignment, Elliot comes across the unfinished work of the mysterious Professor Samsa, who disappeared a long time ago just as he was supposedly on the verge of a breakthrough in his study of polymorphism. Deciding that this would make an ideal topic for his essay, Elliot becomes engrossed in the material. Meanwhile, Josh has accidentally told Elvira about Elliot's crush on Janice and mistakenly thinks that Elliot knows about it and is mad at him. When Elliot suddenly disappears, Josh assumes it's because of him. In an effort to find Elliot, Josh and the girls look at the Samsa material Elliot was working on and conclude that he's turned himself into a squirrel that they see running around the library. Capturing the squirrel, the kids set off in search for the secret lab that is rumored to be out in the forest somewhere. They find the lab and discover Elliot is there safe and sound. In fact, he's found a spider that he is sure is Professor Samsa and is about to try and turn him back into a human, but Victoria accidentally washing the spider down the drain. The children leave depressed at Samsa's ignominious end. After they leave the squirrel climbs into the polymorphing pod, and is transformed into Professor Samsa.
11	"Forbidden Fruit"	April 4, 2004
The ancient Batu-Batu tree is about to bear fruit- a rare event at Creepschool that is celebrated with a special feast of Batu-Batu pudding. The children are warned not to pick the fruit, and definitely not to eat the fruit raw, as this can have a very strange effect. Victoria and Janice, however, do not hear the full warning as they are too busy bickering. As their bickering intensifies, Janice picks a Batu-Batu fruit and dares Victoria to eat from it. Janice eats from it too, and soon they find that they are growing younger. Life at half their age is much less complicated and the girls forget their differences and become best friends. Elsa, realizing that if they get too young they'll disappear altogether, goes to Malcolm for help. Janice and Victoria, however, are oblivious to the fate that awaits them as they're too busy having fun. Dorothy, as the resident expert in age-reducing magic, thinks up an antidote the active ingredient of which is a piece of the root of the Batu-Batu, that has burrowed its way deep beneath the foundations of the school. In a race against the clock, Elliot and Josh brave the unknown to retrieve a piece of Batu-Batu root just as Janice and Victoria have become newborns. The antidote works, the girls are restored to their proper age, and the Batu-Batu feast can go on.
12	"Too Old for Teddy Bears"	May 7, 2004
A rare natural event is about to take place at Creepschool- a blue moon is rising, which can have unforeseen consequences. Remembering the chaos this caused the last time, Gilbert pressures Malcolm to issue a warning to the school. Despite being convinced that the children are too old for it to be a problem, Malcolm nonetheless tells them they should stow away any dolls they might have as they could get out of hand. The problem is, the kids are too old- so they are too ashamed to admit to the others that they still have their dolls. With the waxing of the moon, the dolls come alive and capture the children to exact their revenge for being so cruelly shunned and neglected. They then force the kids to have a tea party and humiliate them by exchange embarrassing anecdotes from their past when their dolls were their best friends. Gilbert, so caught up in the possibility that the children might have dolls, completely forgets that he too has a doll of sorts- a statue of a Chinese dragon that stands on his desk. By the time he remembers, it is already on a rampage, incinerating anything and everything that takes Gilbert away from him. Gilbert immediately realizes that the children are in danger, as they are the ones that take most of his time, and tracks them down just as the dragon is about to set them on fire. In the nick of time the blue moon wanes and the dolls and the dragon are back to normal.
13	"Split Second"	April 16, 2004
Josh is having a problem with time. He is always late for classes, misses appointments and sleeps late. When the school team loses because he forgot the time, he realizes he has a problem. But then he finds a stopwatch, a watch that stops time. Whenever he presses the button everything around him is frozen in time. Josh finds this very useful. He can wake up late for class, stop time, have his breakfast, walk calmly into class and take a seat before unfreezing time again. Nobody around understands what is going on. But Josh's playing with time is taking a toll on his age. Every time he uses the watch he gets older, while everyone else stays the same. Until one day he is an old man, unrecognizable to everyone around him, his friends have to rewind the clock to get him back to his proper age, and think again before they reprimand him for being late.
14	"Don't Let the Bedbugs Bite"	April 7, 2004
Josh is bitten by a bedbug whose sting makes you dream of the future. Josh thinks it is great, now he will be able to see into the future and know things before they happen. The same night he dreams that Janice is in love with him and throws herself at him. Josh wakes up terrified. This is a catastrophe, if he doesn't prevent this from happening he will break both Janice and Elliot's hearts. Josh decides to stay out of Janice's way. Neither Janice or Elliot understands Josh's sudden strange behavior. Janice too is bitten and she sees a different future. She finds Josh and makes sure he understands she is not in love with him and they are still friends.
15	"Puzzled"	April 14, 2004
Friday the 13th is tomorrow and all the students are cautious. They bring out all of their charms to protect themselves. Even classes are canceled. Janice can't believe it. It's all a bunch of stupid superstitions to her. She takes it upon herself to stop this nonsense and prove everyone wrong. When she hears about the big puzzle of superstition she decides that putting that together would be the ultimate proof, that superstition is all in the mind. The myth is that if you put all the thirteen pieces together you will be scattered into 13 pieces. This is exactly what happens, when she lays the puzzle. Now her friends have to overcome their superstitions in order to assemble all the Janice's pieces. Finally they succeed and Janice is whole again, but this time she keeps a rabbit foot for security.
16	"All the World is a Stage"	June 2, 2004
Dorothy wants the students to put on a theater performance. Reluctantly the students agree, and go to the library to find a suitable play. They find a dusty old piece with a character for each student. They start to practice immediately. The only problem is that the play doesn't have an ending, and one of the characters played by Victoria has to write the ending of the play. What the children don't know is that this is a banned play and soon the students become possessed by the characters in the play. Elsa turns out to be a vengeful witch whose mission is to take over Creepschool. Dorothy has to get Victoria to write a new ending where the children are released from the spell.
17	"Just Like Me"	June 17, 2004
Elsa doesn't understand why everyone needs to fight all the time. When it has been raining for almost two weeks everyone is a bit stingy and there are fights breaking out everywhere. Elsa decides to consult her granny. Granny gives her a tune that turns people into what you want them to be. But Elsa overdoes it and everybody turns into copies of herself! Nobody argues anymore, but the school becomes very uneventful and boring. Elsa soon misses her old friends and even their fighting. Tony the only one left as himself suggest she does everything backwards in order to reverse the effect. It works, Soon everyone is fighting again and Elsa couldn't be happier.
18	"Sweet as Chocolate"	April 18, 2004
Janice finds a tool that makes you forget whatever you want people to forget. She even forgets where she misplaces it. Gilbert gets a taste of chocolate and becomes obsessed. He just craves more and more. When Victoria refuses to ask her parents for more, he ends up forging her handwriting and writes to them for more himself. Of course the parents start to worry. Could their daughter be depressed? They turn up at Creepschool and now the whole of Creepschool is at risk. Nobody from the outside is supposed to know of Creepschool's existence- if they did it would mean the end of Creepschool. They have to make the parents forget what they have seen, and after that they have to make Gilbert forget he ever tasted chocolate.
19	"Revolt"	April 21, 2004
Gertrude is forcing the children to do all sorts of gruesome exercises in the rain. The children have had it with her and decide to introduce student board at Creepschool. Malcolm thinks it is a great idea, so do the others in the faculty. Gertrude don't, she wants to put a stop it. Gertrude shuts the children up using a potion that makes them mute, but when they try to submit their student board proposal in writing, she is forced to lock them in room. Unable to speak or move, the shadows of the children break free. The shadows get a life of their own and leave the room under the door. They fly around Creepschool and pester Gertrude, making her life a living hell and Elsa has to come and put a stop to it all. The kids finally get their student board.
20	"Mr. Perfectly Annoying"	April 28, 2004
Janice is afraid of swimming but she doesn't want anyone to know. She tries to practice on her own and almost drowns when she is saved by a boy living in the lake. They become good friends and Janice is happy to have a new friend. She returns often to the lake to seek his company. One day the boy turns up at Creepschool. He has transformed himself so that he can live out of water. Janice is happy at first but after a while she becomes quite annoyed by the boy. He follows here everywhere she goes and has a very hard time adjusting. He misses his own universe and finds the new world strange and hostile. He returns to the water and Janice wins the swimming-contest with his help.
21	"Remote Control"	May 5, 2004
Victoria doesn't know what to do to for the science fair. She gets an old fossilized creature from Gilbert and decides to go with that. But the creature is alive and starts to control her. The creature needs to help him get home, and has her dig a tunnel leading deep under Creepschool where he originally came from. Victoria's friends notice that Victoria is behaving strangely, soon they discover that she is possessed. Gilbert is having his birthday but it seems like everyone has forgotten about it. Depressed and humiliated he decides to leave. Malcolm finds him at the very last moment and presents him with a great party. Victoria gets an honorary-prize at the science fair for her deed of helping a creature to get home. Of course Victoria thinks she deserves it even though she has no memory of what she did.
22	"Past and Imperfect"	May 12, 2004
Victoria finds out she is descended from a noble family. Janice finds out she is the descendant from a rebel. They also find out that their families were in a feud. Janice's ancestors actually overthrew Victoria's and relieved her of her nobility. Victoria has a hard time accepting this. She and Janice become enemies. Soon Victoria is visited by her ancestors who ask her to avenge her family. Victoria starts scheming against Janice, she does things that break the rules and sets up Janice to get the blame. Finally Janice is blamed for the outrageous deed of trying to reveal Creepschool to the entire world. Malcolm has to expel her from Creepschool. Janice is forced to leave, everyone is sad. When Victoria finally gets her land and crown she remembers what good friends she and Janice's were and how futile her victory is compared to that. Victoria confesses to Malcolm and Janice returns to Creepschool.
23	"Believe It or Not"	June 16, 2004
Victoria is a very dedicated news reporter at the Creepschool Gazette. Nothing stands in her way when it comes to finding the best story, not even the truth. Malcolm is very stressed and nervous these days, it is time for the decennial inspection of Creepschool. He and Gilbert are all over the place trying to get everything in order to pass the test, when accidentally Gilbert trips and breaks his leg. Just then Malcolm conveniently finds an ad for a temping agency, which he contacts and soon afterwards Ernest shows up offering his services. Victoria gets suspicious of the new assistant. Nobody believes her however, since she has been so careless with the truth before. Gilbert also finds the man very suspicious and joins with Victoria to get to the bottom of this. It turns out the assistant is a Vorga, a creature that lives on peoples souls and is a master of disguise. Gilbert and Victoria are just about to reveal him when he captures their souls. Victoria's friends realize she has been telling the truth about Ernest and run in and save Malcolm just as he too is about to be relieved of his soul. Everything is back in order; now there is just the inspection left to worry about.
24	"Making Up is Hard to Do"	June 9, 2004
Victoria is a great admirer of herself. She is the smartest, best, most beautiful girl in the world if you ask her. When Dorothy has a garage sale outside her room, Victoria gets her hands on a very beautiful mirror. The mirror turns out to be a talking mirror and also the best friend Victoria ever had. She massages Victoria's ego and when Victoria does anything wrong, such as eating Josh's cookies or ruining Elsa's painting, the mirror assuages whatever guilt Victoria may have. The problem is that Victoria's looks are deteriorating more and more. Soon she cannot be without the makeup the mirror offers her. The more selfishly and nastily she behaves under the power of her new ego, the more blemishes she gets. Soon there is only one thing left to do. Take the Creepschool crest that supposedly gives Creepschool all the power and glory it possesses. As soon as Victoria removes the crest from its place, the school starts to crumble and fall to pieces. Victoria finally wakes up from her obsession and despite protests from the mirrors she put the crest back and runs off into the woods convinced she will now be ugly forever. Elsa runs after her and makes her look in a small mirror. When Victoria looks in the mirror, she looks like she always has. Victoria throws the talking mirror down the garbage chute and promises herself she will never look in a mirror again, well not for a very long time at least.
25	"Game Over"	May 19, 2004
Josh has got a new hand-held computer game and is playing it constantly, so much so that Elliot hasn't gotten any sleep. When Elliot complain, Josh teases him saying he's just jealous cause he could never beat Josh's high score. Faced with this challenge, Elliot starts to play. The object of the game is to escape the ants- each level has a special weapon and golden key that have to be found in order to make it to the next level. Elliot quickly becomes so obsessed with the game that he can think of nothing else, he plays in class, ignores his friends, forgets his school work- clearly something drastic needs to be done. In a final effort to get rid of the game, Mr. Edgar throws it down the inter-dimensional garbage chute, but a desperate Elliot jumps in after it. When he exits the chute he cannot find the game, but soon discovers that he is in fact inside it and has to run for his life from the pixilated ants. Using what he learned playing the game he barely escapes the ants. At first he rushes around in a panic trying to warn everyone about the ants, but they just look at him like he's crazy. It turns out that the ants only appear when he is alone. When he realizes this he does all he can to hang out with his friends, or anyone else who will put up with him. In the end, however, he is forced to defeat the queen ant in the final level in order to escape from the game. When he finally does, the hand-held game reappears and Elliot emerges elated and victorious holding the game- all his friends cannot understand how he could have gotten so carries away with a stupid little game.
26	"Lost and Found"	June 23, 2004
Victoria has lost a necklace she got as a present from her parents a few days earlier, and goads everyone into helping her find it. While they're out looking, Janice finds an old toy, a merry-go-round. Whenever she sets it in motion, a strange music starts up and she is transported into the past where she meets a young boy who's just lost his parents and is being taken away to live with his cruel uncle. Each visit to the past, however, last only a few minutes before she is pulled back into her own time again. Despite her friends advice that she stay away from that toy as it could be of evil design, she becomes so concerned with the little boy's fate that she repeatedly returns to the past in an effort to help him, but with each trip the toy becomes damages, and it becomes more and more difficult to return to the past. Meanwhile, her friends, in their search for the necklace, discover the Lost and Found Emporium, a storage room for all things ever lost by anyone throughout time. At first they're not allowed to look for the necklace because whatever lesson Victoria gained by losing the necklace would itself be lost if she were to find the necklace. Finally, however, the caretaker looks in his books and explains that the necklace isn't there anyway because someone else found it. Unbeknownst to them, that someone is Janice, who accidentally finds the necklace when she takes the toy to Tony to ask his help in fixing it. When she then goes back in time one final time, she succeeds in helping the little boy escape and puts him in the care of the benevolent Mr. Mars, who is starting a school for lost children. Having nothing else to give the little boy to remember her by, she gives him Victoria's necklace. Back in the present, Janice is melancholic at the thought that she'll never see the little boy again as the merry-go-round is beyond repair. She talks about it with Malcolm, who sympathizes as he once lost a good friend in a similar way, but he has a little memento to remember her by. He pulls it out to show her- it's Victoria's necklace! The two friends are happily reunited, and Victoria gets her necklace back.

== Broadcast history ==
The series used to air on the Canadian Teletoon. It currently airs in Portugal on RTP2, in Sweden on SVTB and in France on Gulli. It was previously broadcast on Cartoon Network (India) in English and other regional languages. It also airs on Cartoon Network (Pakistan). As of July 2017, the entire series is available on YouTube in English and Swedish.
