= My Life Me =

Animated television series

- Genre: Comedy; Tween
- Created by: JC Little; Cindy Filipenko; Svetlana Chmakova
- Directed by: JC Little; Mr. Niko
- Voices of: Claudia-Laurie Corbeil; Nicolas Charbonneaux-Collombet; Émilie Bibeau; Émile Mailhiot
- Theme music composer: Skye Sweetnam; Jordan Francis
- Composers: Terry Tompkins; Steve D'Angelo
- Countries of origin: Canada; France
- Original languages: French; English
- No. of seasons: 1
- No. of episodes: 52

Production
- Executive producers: Normand Thauvette; Olivier Dumont
- Producers: Marie-Claude Beauchamp; Paul Risacher; Beth Parker; Damien Tromel
- Running time: 23 minutes (11 minutes per segment)
- Production companies: Carpediem Film and Television; OD Media

Original release
- Network: Télétoon (Canada French); Teletoon (Canada English); France 4 (France); Canal J (France)
- Release: March 17, 2010 – September 30, 2011

My Life Me (French: Trois et moi) is an animated series created by JC Little, Cindy Filipenko and Svetlana Chmakova, co-directed by Mr. Niko. The series is a slice-of-life comedy that follows Birch Small, a teenage otaku with aspirations of being a cartoonist, as she tries to survive junior high school with her friends. The series is notable featuring manga iconography such as sweatdrops, speech bubbles, and chibis.

The series premiered in Poland at ZigZap on March 17 2010 and on the French-language Télétoon on September 19, 2010. It debuted on the English-language channel Teletoon between September 5 to September 30, 2011. It also aired in the United States on the short-lived PBJ.

== Production ==
CarpeDiem Film & TV received a development deal from Teletoon to create My Life Me in 2006. It was greenlit for production in June 2008, with TV-Loonland AG joining as the international distributor. France 2 and Canal J also agreed to be co-comissioning broadcast partners. The series was a co-production between Canadian and French companies. It was intended to be the first project from CarpeDiem's new Montreal studio named Animation Station. The episodes were animated using ToonBoom Harmony, and the animation was split episodically between Toutenkartoon in Montreal, and Caribara in Angoulême, France. Backgrounds were created in Maya, then cel-shaded, rendered and imported into Harmony. The animators did a hybrid of digital and hand drawn to help the fluidity in the animation.

Animated digitally, manga aesthetics were given homage "using various comic book manga codes and language such as stylish black and white comic book panels dropping behind the characters to express their suppressed feelings on screen." Even before production began My Life Me was planned to be "developed as a lifestyle brand, there will be a licensing and merchandising program to support the brand with a strong emphasis on publishing, accessories, gifts, stationery, apparel as well as a strong online component with a fully interactive website currently in production." The planned delivery of the series, shorts, and website was fall 2009.

My Life Me was "at the top of German co-production group TV-Loonland AG's offering in the 2009 autumn TV markets". In early 2010, TV-Loonland filed for bankruptcy/insolvency and its assets were sold off. My Life Me, at the time still in production, was one of such properties. The series was acquired by Classic Media in February. Classic Media took control of all media iterations of the property including the planned "heavily interactive" website. "Other than the television series, fifty-two eleven-minute episodes, the property is reported to include music video clips and more for mobile, online, and video on-demand distribution."

The series is now owned by DreamWorks Animation, due to their buyout of Classic Media in 2012.

== Premise ==
Birch Small's school system requires her and her classmates, Liam, Sandra, and Raffi to work together in a group known around the school as a "Pod." The students don't get to choose who they are partnered up with; they must work together, despite their differences and shortcomings.

== Characters ==
- Birch Small (French: Béa Petit; Voiced by Claudia-Laurie Corbeil in the French version, and Sarah Camacho in the English version): A 13-year-old cartoonist and otaku. She is shown to be very familiar with almost anything involving art, including various historical artist names. Birch has a crush on Raffi, and her crush on him causes her to constantly try to impress him, often doing absurd things, such as becoming vegetarian simply because Raffi was conflicted with her love of fast foods and meaty foods. She is also heavily interested with Japanese manga and is usually seen drawing comics in the style associated with them.
- Liam Coll (Voiced by Nicolas Charbonneaux-Collombet in the French version, and Mark Hauser in the English version): 14-year-old cousin of Birch. He's very close to Birch as he's often seen in Birch's house for one reason or another. His silly and ignorant personality often causes problems, even getting himself into a "duel" with another kid in school unintentionally; however, his personal skills and specialties have their uses and can come out to help and often come out to help his "pod" in tight situations. Liam also expresses a rather continuous problem of being unable to "find himself" as that he can't find one thing he wants to be or one thing to fully define himself as he will often express a different hobby or interest in different episodes. Like Birch, Liam is heavily into manga, and contributes the plot and writing to Birch's illustrations.
- Sandra le Blanc (Voiced by Émilie Bibeau in the French version, and Stéfanie Buxton in the English version): A 14-year-old skateboarder. She's rude and tomboyish, and will often will do things to earn the discomfort and embarrassment of others for her own entertainment, and often would go so far as to try to get others including members of her "pod" to get angry at each other again for her own entertainment. She constantly denies of her "geek phase" that she had before, instead constantly bashing her own pod's geeky moments.
- Raffi Rodriguez (Voiced by Émile Mailhiot in the French version, and Justin Bradley in the English version): Love interest of Birch. An extremely popular student in school, he often gets chosen for events and fundraisers, and gets much attention from the female students, much to the jealousy of other male students such as Liam. He is 14-year-old, and often concerned about his looks and expresses that as his only concern at times. He's shown to care for Birch considerably, and is implied in some scenes to also have a crush on her. One of the ways the official website has described him as, "would drive anyone crazy if he wasn't so darn nice".

== Episodes ==
Teletoon original airdates follow the episode titles in parentheses:

1. Misconcepted Deceptions (September 5, 2011)
2. Reach for the Pod (September 5, 2011)
3. Big Man on Canvas (September 5, 2011)
4. The Pencil Assassin (September 5, 2011)
5. The Makeover (September 6, 2011)
6. The Pom-Pom Girl (September 6, 2011)
7. Unreasonable Facsimiles (September 6, 2011)
8. Planets Maligned (September 6, 2011)
9. The Big Flap (September 7, 2011)
10. Finding Neko (September 7, 2011)
11. The Raffi Raffle (September 7, 2011)
12. Crushed (September 7, 2011)
13. Friday the 13th (September 8, 2011)
14. Bossman's Blues (September 8, 2011)
15. Birch's Beef (September 8, 2011)
16. A Fine Balance (September 8, 2011)
17. Liam the Hero (September 9, 2011)
18. True Colors (September 9, 2011)
19. Love Lessons (September 9, 2011)
20. Miss President (September 9, 2011)
21. Bad Company (September 12, 2011)
22. Manga Slam (September 12, 2011)
23. They're Watching Us (September 12, 2011)
24. The Mascot (September 12, 2011)
25. Holiday Hijinx (September 13, 2011)
26. Rope Burn (September 13, 2011)
27. There's No Business... (September 22, 2011)
28. Growing Pains (September 22, 2011)
29. Comic Chaos (September 22, 2011)
30. Working Stiff (September 22, 2011)
31. Star-Struck (September 23, 2011)
32. The Big Switch (September 23, 2011)
33. A Bed for Raffi (September 23, 2011)
34. Back to the Stone Age (September 23, 2011)
35. The Costume Party (September 26, 2011)
36. Integrity Insmegrity (September 26, 2011)
37. Making a Mountain of a Molehill (September 26, 2011)
38. Here's Liam (September 26, 2011)
39. The Diary (September 27, 2011)
40. Raffi's Secret Love (September 27, 2011)
41. Skate Club (September 27, 2011)
42. Pinged and Ponged (September 27, 2011)
43. Love is in the Air (September 28, 2011)
44. Cyranette (September 28, 2011)
45. Liam and the Kid's Big Day Out (September 28, 2011)
46. Cut Out the Sarkasm (September 28, 2011)
47. Family Tree (September 29, 2011)
48. Just Say Nooo (September 29, 2011)
49. At Odds with the Pad (September 29, 2011)
50. Accept No Substitutes (September 29, 2011)
51. Fish Fiasco (September 30, 2011)
52. Birch's Trial (September 30, 2011)

== Nominations ==
It was nominated for a Kidscreen Award 2010. The MyLifeME.com website was nominated for Best Kids Interactive for the Canada New Media Awards in 2010. My Life Me was nominated for two Gemini Awards in 2011; in Internet and New Media, Best Website for a Program or Series: Youth and in Television, Best Animation Program or Series.
