= The Boy (TV series) =

2004 Canadian animated TV series

- Genre: Spy-fi
- Written by: Norman LeBlanc
- Directed by: Phillip Stamp
- Voices of: Aaron Grunfeld; Kayla Grunfeld; Daniel Brochu
- Composer: Daniel Scott
- Country of origin: Canada
- Original language: English
- No. of seasons: 2
- No. of episodes: 26 (list of episodes)

Production
- Production company: Tooncan Productions, Inc.

Original release
- Network: YTV
- Release: January 1, 2004 – September 5, 2005

The Boy is a Canadian animated television series that aired on YTV from January 2004 to September 2005. The series is about the adventures of Toby Goodwin, a boy genius and a member of the International Federation for Peace. With his partner, agent Bob St. Vincent, he travels all over the world to fight villains.

In the United States, the series aired on Animania HD.

== Production ==
The total cost of the series was $9 million.

== Episodes ==
=== Season 1 ===
No. in season	Title	Original release date
1	"Pokeboy"	January 1, 2004
2	"The Invisible Boy"	TBA
3	"Hide'n Go Boy'"	TBA
4	"Free Inside"	TBA
5	"Jack Flash"	TBA
6	"Fish'n Chips"	TBA
7	"Bug Hunter"	TBA
8	"Bad Boy"	TBA
9	"Batteries Not Included"	TBA
10	"Beam Me Up Bob"	TBA
11	"Most Dangerous Situation"	TBA
12	"Tango"	TBA
13	"One Plus One Equals Dead"	TBA
14	"Boy of the Dolphin"	TBA
15	"Boy's Best Friend"	TBA

=== Season 2 ===
No. in season	Title	Original release date
1	"Xeno Boy"	TBA
2	"I Told You So"	TBA
3	"Pressure Factor"	TBA
4	"I, Ludd"	TBA
5	"Hold That Thought"	TBA
6	"Coyote Boy"	TBA
7	"If You See What I Mean"	TBA
8	"Three Card Monty"	TBA
9	"The Golden Boy"	TBA
10	"The Sky is Falling"	TBA
11	"The Boy vs. the Volcano"	September 5, 2005
