= Sebastian Pigott =

Canadian actor and singer

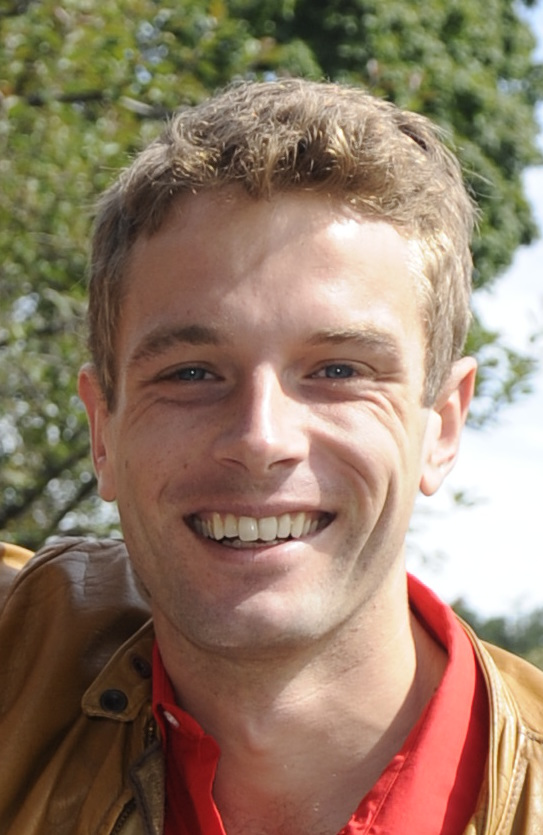
- Pigott in 2011

Background information
- Genre: Pop
- Occupations: Singer-songwriter, actor
- Instruments: Guitar vocals
- Years active: 2002–present
- Member of: The Pigott Brothers

Sebastian Pigott is a Canadian singer and actor. He was a contestant on the sixth season of Canadian Idol, in 2008. He has guest-starred on numerous television series, including Murdoch Mysteries and Revenge.

== Life and career ==
Pigott has subsequently appeared in such network television shows as The Listener, Heartland, The Border and Deadliest Sea. His most prominent role to date has been that of barista Kai Booker on CBC Television's Being Erica (seasons 2 to 4), for which he and his brother Oliver wrote the songs "Alien Like You" and "Hard To Go".

Pigott and his brother Oliver formed a band called Pigott Brothers and released their debut album, Pigottry, in 2009. Their second album, The Age Of Peace, was released in the fourth quarter of 2012.

== Filmography ==
=== Film ===
Year	Title	Role	Notes
2001	Two Days Till Tomorrow	Luke	
2007	The Poet	Peter	
2010	Saw 3D	Brad	
2011	High Chicago	The Kid	
2013	Pacific Rim	Engineer	
2013	Poker Night	Sticks	
2013	Victims	Riley	
2016	Below Her Mouth	Rile	
2017	Kodachrome	Elijah	
2017	Love Is...	Emmett	
2018	Anon	Detective Vardy	
2018	The New Romantic	Bobby	
2019	Demons Inside Me	Mike Grover	
2019	Midway	Petty Officer #2	
2020	Two Deaths of Henry Baker	Hank	Also screenwriter
2021	Awake	Clarence	
2022	Moonfall	Mission Commander	
2024	The Order	Bruce Pierce	Post-production

=== Television ===
Year	Title	Role	Notes
2007	Roxy Hunter and the Mystery of the Moody Ghost	Ted Caruthers	Television film
2008	The Border	Jason Whitmore	Episode: "Articles of Faith"
2009	Deadliest Sea	Tommy	Television film
2009	Heartland	Carson McMaster	Episode: "Miracle"
2009	The Listener	Tyler Stebbes	Episode: "Missing"
2009–2011	Being Erica	Kai Booker	Recurring role
2010	The Bridge	Danny	Episode: "The Fat Lady Sings the Blues"
2010	Crash & Burn	David Kendricks	Episode: "Closure"
2010	Haven	Bill McShaw	Episode: "Consumed"
2011	Committed	Bobby Gow	Television film
2011	Covert Affairs	Corey	Episode: "Bang and Blame"
2011	Murdoch Mysteries	Billy Hoobin	Episode: "Voices"
2012	Flashpoint	Elliot Thaine	Episode: "Forget Oblivion"
2012–2013	Bomb Girls	James Dunn	Recurring role
2013	Cinnamon Girl	Billy Cassady	Television film
2013	Cracked	Nolan Arthur	Episode: "Swans"
2014	Ascension	Rawles	Miniseries
2014	Darknet	Jack	Episode: "Darknet 5"
2014	Killing Daddy	Jake Watkins	Television film
2015	Revenge	Lyman Ellis	Recurring role
2016	Rogue	Greg	Guest role; 3 episodes
2017	Channel Zero: No-End House	Dylan Evans	Main role
2017	Mommy's Little Boy	Shane Reed	Television film
2017	Slasher: Guilty Party	Wren	Recurring role
2018	Frankie Drake Mysteries	Sasha	Episode: "Anastasia"
2018	Wynonna Earp	Charlie	Recurring role (season 3)
2018–2020	Murdoch Mysteries	Andrew Dixon	Recurring role (seasons 12–13)
2019	Good Witch	Phil Sturgis	Recurring role
2019	Killer Indiscretion	Kevin Smith	Television film
2019	The Radio Talk Show Killer	Brett Cundall	Television film
2019	Ransom	Gerry Reed	Episode: "Anatomy of a Lost Cause"
2021	Hudson & Rex	Wayne Needles	Episode: "Manhunt"
2022	The Song to My Heart	Ryder Jamison	Television film

== Awards ==
Year	Award	Category	Work nominated	Result
2023	Canadian Screen Awards	Best Writing in TV Movie	Two Deaths of Henry Baker	Nominated

== Discography ==
=== With the Pigott Brothers ===
Year	Album title
2009	Pigottry (Remastered)
2012	The Age Of Peace

==== Singles ====
Year	Title
2009	Alien Like You
2011	The Beautiful's Gone
2011	Crazy in Your Heart
2011	Mama Ain't Down
2011	Walk You to the Water
2013	The Age of Peace, Pt. 2
2020	Hard to Go
