= Georgina Reilly =

English-Canadian actress

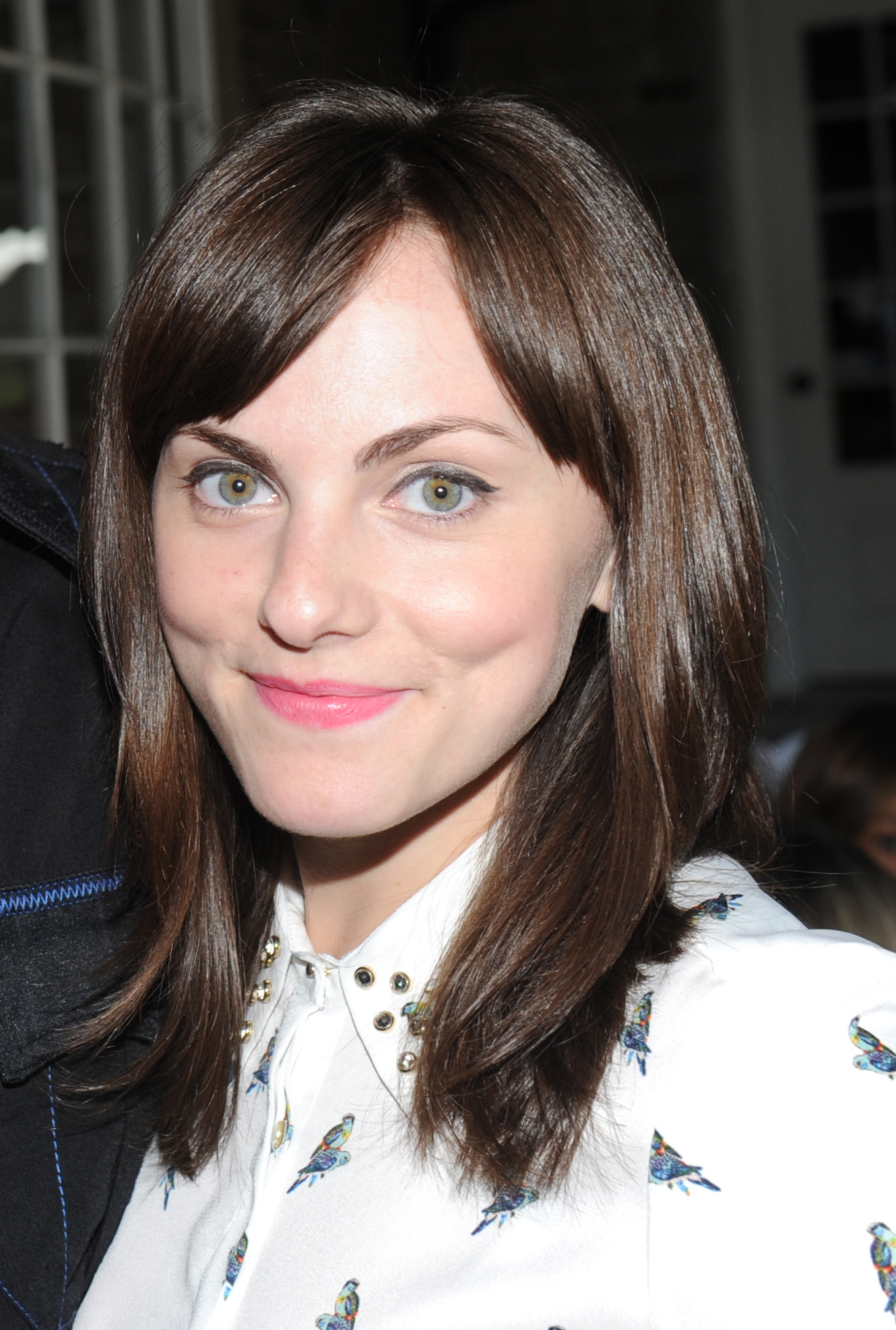
- Reilly in 2012
- Born: 1985 or 1986 (age 39–40); Guildford, Surrey, England
- Occupation: Actress
- Years active: 2006–present
- Spouse: Mark O'Brien (m. 2013)
- Children: 1

Georgina Reilly (born 1985 or 1986) is a British-Canadian film and television actress best known to date for her roles in the films Pontypool and This Movie Is Broken, the television series The L.A. Complex, Quantum Leap, and Murdoch Mysteries, as well as the CBC Radio drama series Trust Inc.

== Early years ==
Reilly was born in Surrey, England, and moved with her family to Toronto, Canada, when she was sixteen. She attended and graduated from Havergal College.

== Personal life ==
Reilly is the granddaughter of Canadian musician Tommy Reilly. Her father, David T. Reilly, is a writer and composer, and her mother works in production. Reilly's older brother is a DJ.

She married her Republic of Doyle costar Mark O'Brien on January 6, 2013, after having met on the set of his show in 2011. Former co-star Jonny Harris was present at the wedding. In November 2017, the couple welcomed their first child, a daughter.

== Filmography ==
=== Film ===
Year	Title	Role	Notes
2007	Terry Southern's Plums and Prunes	Debbie	Short film
2008	Pontypool	Laurel-Ann Drummond	
2009	A Hindu's Indictment of Heaven	Woman	Short film
2010	This Movie Is Broken	Caroline	
2011	Stag	Pam	
2012	Eddie: The Sleepwalking Cannibal	Lesley	
2012	How To Keep Your Day Job	Employee	Short film
2012	Better People	Natalie	Short film
2013	Bodyslam	Kara	Short film
2015	Wanderer	Jess	Short film
2016	Sing for Your Supper	Billie	Short film
2019	Goalie	Pat Morey	
2023	Match Me If You Can	Kip Parsons	
2026	The Voices of Our Mother	Annika	

=== Television ===
Year	Title	Role	Notes
2006	Beautiful People	Girl #2	Episode: "Black Diamonds, White Lies"
2007	The Dark Room	Whitney Allbright	Television film
2009	Overruled!	Julie	4 episodes
2009	Majority Rules!	Darcy Mankowitz	4 episodes
2009	How to Be Indie	Skye	Episode: "How to Prove You're Actually a Nice Person..."
2009	Valemont	Melissa	5 episodes
2010	Unnatural History	Katya Cattleman	Episode: "The Heart of the Warrior"
2011	Republic of Doyle	Cindy	Episode: "Crashing on the Couch"
2011	My Babysitter's a Vampire	Debbie Dazzle	Episode: "Guys and Dolls"
2012–2016	Murdoch Mysteries	Dr. Emily Grace	Season 5: recurring; Seasons 6 - 8: regular; Season 9: episodes 901 - 903
2012	The L.A. Complex	Sabrina Reynolds	Season 1; recurring, season 2; regular
2014	Saving Hope	Denise	Episode: "43 Minutes"
2014	Heartland	Charlene Young	Episode: "On the Line"
2015	Paradise Pictures	Gretchen Whalon	Television film
2016	Blindspot	Chris	Episode: "Why Let Cooler Pasture Deform"
2016	Stitchers	Stephanie Fisher	Episode: "All In"
2017	There's... Johnny!	Sarah	Episode: "Take Me to Church"
2018	Save the Date	Christine	Recurring role
2019	Hudson & Rex	Charlotte Vanderholt	Episode: "Dead Man Walking"
2019	City on a Hill	Corie Struthers	Recurring role
2020	The Baker & the Beauty	Piper	Recurring role
2021	CSI: Vegas	Laura Kennerly	Episode: "Let the Chips Fall"
2021	Rebel	Tamsin Pless	Episode: "Heart Burned"
2021	FBI: Most Wanted	Sheri James	Episode: "Hustler"
2022–2024	Quantum Leap	Janice Calavicci	Recurring role
