= Olympic Festival =

The Olympic Festival can refer to:

- Olympic Games, or various events held around them
  - Olympic Arts Festival, also known as the Cultural Olympiad, a series of arts events held in conjunction with the Olympic Games
- Australian Youth Olympic Festival, a biannual multi-sport event
- European Youth Olympic Festival, a biannual multi-sport event
- Olympic Island Festival, a music festival in Toronto
- Olympic Music Festival, held in Quilcene, Washington
- U.S. Olympic Festival, a former multi-sport event
