= An Audience of Chairs =

- Film poster
- Directed by: Deanne Foley
- Written by: Rosemary House
- Based on: An Audience of Chairs by Joan Clark
- Produced by: Jill Knox-Gosse; Lynne Wilson; Paul Stephens; Eric Jordan
- Starring: Carolina Bartczak; Gord Rand; Chris Jacot; Kate Corbett; Peter MacNeill
- Cinematography: James Klopko
- Edited by: Wiebke von Carolsfeld
- Music by: Duane Andrews
- Distributed by: A71
- Release dates: September 14, 2018 (FIN Atlantic International Film Festival); March 6, 2019
- Country: Canada
- Language: English

An Audience of Chairs is a 2018 Canadian drama film directed by Deanne Foley and written by Rosemary House. It is adapted from the book by Joan Clark. It stars Carolina Bartczak as Maura, a beautiful woman suffering from mental illness. The film was theatrically released on March 6, 2019.

== Plot ==
Set in 1997, in Tors Cove, Newfoundland, Maura Mackenzie and her two daughters, Bonnie and Brianna Fraser, arrive at their summer home for a two-week vacation. Maura's husband, and the girls’ father, Duncan Fraser, is an ambitious reporter travelling through Russia on a political scoop. Maura is a talented and up-and-coming pianist who plans for a two-week rest before her American tour audition.

Maura receives a phone call from Duncan telling her that he has decided to stay in Russia for the entirety of the summer to pursue his story, forcing Maura to stay in Newfoundland for the rest of the summer, thereby missing her audition. This causes her to fall into a depression, pounding on the piano at night, and sleeping throughout the day leaving her children unattended. Maura's father Ian, who lives nearby, begins to suspect that she may be exhibiting signs of bipolar disorder.

One day, Maura takes her children to a nearby island, and in a state of mania, forgets them there. Bonnie breaks her arm, and almost drowns as a result. Maura falls into a state of deep depression. Duncan returns and takes the children to Scotland with him, leaving Maura behind. Maura becomes isolated and violent and refuses to take any medication after being diagnosed with bipolar II disorder by a doctor. Her neighbour Paula, finally convinces her to seek help so that she can be reunited with her daughters.

Maura is released from a psychiatric ward 6 months later once the doctors assess that she is healthy. She wins a legal visitation with her children despite Duncan's protests. However, during a walk in the woods, she twists her ankle and misses the visitation, prompting Duncan to ask for a divorce and full custody of the children. This sends Maura into despair and she travels to the coast with a plan to drown herself in the same wharf where she claims her mother committed suicide.

Maura arrives at the wharf completely disoriented by the illness. She hallucinates that her mother is beckoning her into the ocean. Maura follows the apparition of her mother into the ocean and almost drowns. Maura is rescued by Ben, a lonely trucker who happens to be travelling through. They spend the night together and she joins him on a month long tour of the nearby provinces. They fall in love and live together in Tors Cove.

The story jumps 20 years, when Maura is in her mid 40s. Her neighbour Paula, delivers her a newspaper with Bonnie Fraser's picture on the cover. Bonnie is a professor and has returned to Newfoundland to lecture at Memorial University about the dangers of climate change. Maura and Ben decide to attend the lecture in hopes of reuniting. When they arrive, they overhear Bonnie discussing her wedding plans which will take place later that month in Newfoundland. Maura approaches Bonnie, but Bonnie doesn't recognize her, leaving Maura distraught.

Paula convinces Maura that she should go to Bonnie's wedding. After some convincing Maura hatches a plan to send her two daughters a bouquet of their favourite childhood flowers. She plans to watch them enter the church, and if they carry the flowers, she will know that they have forgiven her for being an absent mother. However, as they arrive at the church, Maura has a panic attack and only glimpses them from behind as they enter the church. Maura is too nervous to wait, and as she goes to leave, Bonnie exits the church and sees her mother standing there. They are finally reunited. The end of the film shows both adult Bonnie and Brianna, arriving at the Tors Cove home, to be with their mother.

== Cast ==
- Carolina Bartczak as Maura
- Peter MacNeill as Ian
- Gord Rand as Ben
- Chris Jacot as Duncan
- Kate Corbett as Adult Bonnie
- Lauren Patten as Young Brianna
- Grace Keeping as Young Bonnie
- Katie Russell as Young Ginger
- Edie Inksetter as Paula
- Madeleine Hiscox as Gemma

== Awards ==
At the Atlantic Film Festival, An Audience of Chairs won Best Atlantic Feature and Deanne Foley won Best Atlantic Director. The film's screenwriter Rosemary House, also from Newfoundland, won for Best Atlantic Screenwriting, and St. John's- based Duane Andrews won for Best Atlantic Score or Song. The film was also presented as the Opening Night Gala Film at The St. John's International Women's Film Festival, Whistler Film Festival, and Cinefest.

== Production ==
The film was produced by Jill Knox-Gosse and Lynne Wilson of Wreckhouse Productions and Eric Jordan and Paul Stephens of The Film Works. The film received funding from Telefilm as well as other Canadian government bodies. On September 8, 2017, Variety magazine published that the film would also receive funding from the Breaking Barriers fund at the CBC which targeted underrepresented Canadian creators.

On July 17, 2017, Deadline announced that principal photography would begin in Tors Cove, Newfoundland.

The film had its television premiere on July 13, 2019 on CBC Television.
