= Kerr Hewitt =

Canadian actor and writer

Kerr Hewitt, also credited professionally as Kjartan Hewitt, is a Canadian actor and writer. He won the Best Actor award at the Sicily Web Festival for his performance in the YouTube web series Clusterfuck (2018).

== Career ==
=== Acting ===
Hewitt began working in the entertainment industry as a teenager, on television series for the CBC and YTV. When he was 17, he began writing plays and musicals. He then went on to study a BA in English literature. He made an appearance in Edgar Wright's Scott Pilgrim vs. the World (2010) as Jimmy. Jimmy was the boyfriend of Scott Pilgrim's sister before being seduced by Pilgrim's roommate Wallace at a "Crash and the Boys" (a fictional version of Toronto band Broken Social Scene) concert and appearing in recurring gags with Wallace. Hewitt starred in a larger role in another feature film in 2010, This Movie Is Broken, playing Blake, the best friend of a young Toronto man who tries to impress a girl by taking her to a Broken Social Scene concert with them. The concert in the film was the real 2009 Harbourfront Centre concert, around which part of the plot revolves.

In 2018, he starred in the YouTube web series Clusterfuck, which follows the lives of millennials in downtown Toronto. Hewitt won the Best Actor award for his role at the Sicily Web Festival, where the series was given a premiere,.

Hewitt has starred most prominently in works with a strong Toronto identity: Scott Pilgrim vs. the World, This Movie Is Broken, and Clusterfuck.

=== Writing ===
He studied the Features program at Canadian Film Centre, turning one of his old plays – Claire, From the Bus – into a film and completing the course in 2017 at the age of 30. Claire, From the Bus had debuted on the Toronto theatre circuit in 2013, starring Bryn McAuley as Claire, with positive reception for Hewitt's writing. The film, directed by Jordan Canning, was released in 2016.

== Filmography ==
=== Film ===
Year	Title	Role	Notes
2005	Capote	Danny Burke	
2008	Max Payne	Kid	
2010	This Movie Is Broken	Blake	
2010	Scott Pilgrim vs. the World	Jimmy	
2013	Nurse 3D	Orderly	
2014	Debug	Mel	
2015	Anxietyville	Mr. Nobody	
2015	Cold Deck	Ben	
2017	Molly's Game	Player	
2017	Clusterf*ck	Brian	
2019	Goalie	Cal Gardiner	
2019	Demons Inside Me	Toby Hunter	
2020	Learning to Love Again	Chris	

=== Television ===
Year	Title	Role	Notes
2000	Children of My Heart	Nikolai	Television film
2003	2030 CE	Dr. Manno Susik	3 episodes
2003	More Than Meets the Eye: The Joan Brock Story	High School Boy	Television film
2004	The Winning Season	Program Boy	Television film
2004	Category 6: Day of Destruction	Tad	Television film
2009	The Listener	Baggy	Episode: "Lisa Says"
2009	The Future Life of Jake	Aaron	Television film
2009	Being Erica	Martin	Episode: "Papa Can You Hear Me?"
2010	Unnatural History	Milo Pheiffer	Episode: "Public School Enemies"
2010	Rookie Blue	Dale	Episode: "Hot and Bothered"
2011, 2015	Murdoch Mysteries	Matthew Trent / Corporal Young	2 episodes
2012	Sunshine Sketches of a Little Town	Peter Pupkins	Television film
2012	King	Stephen Ennis	Episode: "Justice Calvin Faulkner"
2013	Bomb Girls	Karl	Episode: "Guests of Honour"
2013	Cracked	Damian	Episode: "The Light in the Black"
2013	State of Syn	Gabriel	Episode #1.5
2014	Darknet	Darren	Episode: "Darknet 2"
2014	Reign	Eduard	2 episodes
2015	Saving Hope	Graeme	Episode: "All the Pretty Horses"
2015	Dark Matter	Sergeant Voss	Episode: "Pilot - Part 2"
2015	Swept Under	Dennis	Television film
2016	Houdini & Doyle	Reverend Farley	Episode: "The Pall of LaPier"
2017	The Beaverton	Brice Larson	Episode #1.7
2017	The Strain	Jeremiah	3 episodes
2018	Condor	Harold Floros	3 episodes
2018–2019	Blackout	Ethan Reed	9 episodes
2019	Killjoys	Sylas Robbel	3 episodes
2020	The Umbrella Academy	Hal	Episode: "The Frankel Footage"
