= This Movie Is Broken =

- Theatrical release poster
- Directed by: Bruce McDonald
- Screenplay by: Don McKellar
- Story by: Don McKellar; Bruce McDonald; Kevin Drew
- Produced by: Rhombus Media; Shadow Shows
- Starring: Broken Social Scene; Greg Calderone; Georgina Reilly; Kerr Hewitt
- Cinematography: John Price
- Edited by: Matthew Hannam; Gareth C. Scales
- Music by: Broken Social Scene
- Distributed by: Alliance Films (Canada); E1 Entertainment (International)
- Release date: June 25, 2010 (Canada)
- Running time: 85 minutes
- Country: Canada
- Language: English

This Movie Is Broken is a 2010 Canadian film directed by Bruce McDonald. A cross between a romantic comedy and a concert film, the film stars Greg Calderone as Bruno, a young man hoping to convince his longtime crush Caroline (Georgina Reilly) to become his girlfriend by taking her to a Broken Social Scene concert at Harbourfront.

The concert segments were recorded at the band's Harbourfront show on July 11, 2009, following the cancellation of that year's Olympic Island Festival due to the 2009 Toronto strike.

The film's theatrical premiere was held at Toronto's NXNE festival in 2010.

== Plot ==
Bruno wakes up in bed next to Caroline, his long-time crush. But tomorrow she's off for school in France, and maybe she only granted this miracle as a parting gift for her long-time friend. So tonight—tonight is Bruno's last chance. And tonight, as it happens, Broken Social Scene, her favourite band, is throwing a big outdoor bash. Maybe if Bruno, with the help of his best pal Blake, can score tickets and give Caroline a night to remember, he can keep this miracle alive.

== Cast ==
- Georgina Reilly as Caroline
- Greg Calderone as Bruno
- Kerr Hewitt as Blake
- Lyndie Greenwood as Blake's Girlfriend
- Tracy Wright as Box Office Woman
- Stephen McHattie as Security Guard
- Mayko Nguyen as Publicist
- Bobby Sahni as Concert MC

== Reception ==
Liam Lacey of The Globe and Mail remarked of the film, "The drama floats by like a bubble of yearning and delight, and then ends with a slightly silly pop. Contrary to our expectations, this isn't really a version of Before Sunset set in the T.Dot. It's a Broken Social Scene movie, with a sweet tease of a story that pretends for a moment that Toronto and Paris could share an affair."
