= Erika Linder =

Swedish model and actress

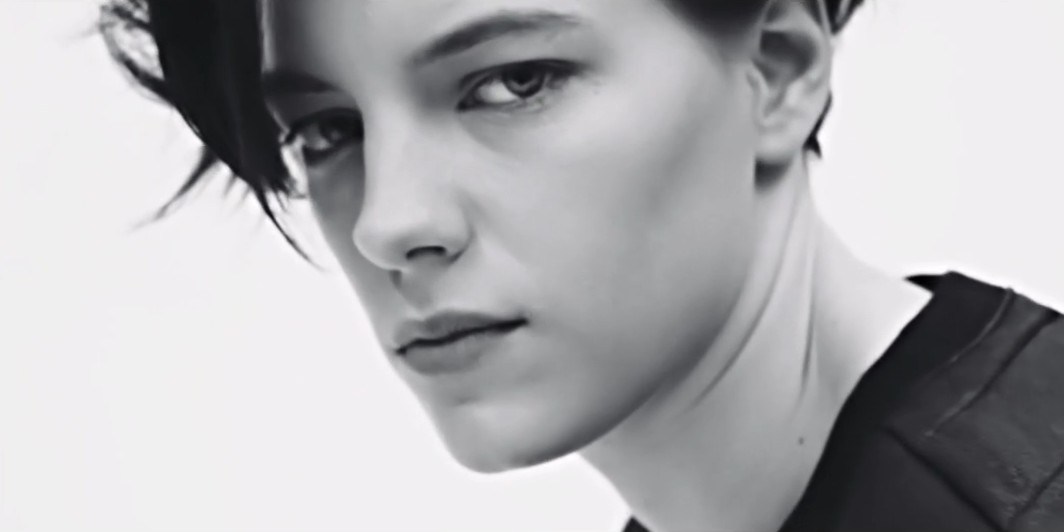
- Linder in 2014
- Born: 1990 (age 35–36); Sundbyberg, Stockholm County, Sweden
- Occupations: Model; actress
- Years active: 2011–present
- Modeling information
- Height: 1.75 m (5 ft 9 in)
- Hair color: Blonde
- Eye color: Blue
- Agency: Next Model Management (New York, Paris, London, Los Angeles); Unique Denmark (Copenhagen); Mikas (Stockholm)

Erika Linder (born 1990) is a Swedish model and actress. She is a model who models both male and female clothing. In 2016, she starred in the film Below Her Mouth.

== Early life ==
Linder was born in Sundbyberg, Stockholm County, Sweden. She was scouted to be a model at a concert when she was 14 years old but declined the offer. She studied law in high school and language for one year at university, and played football until she was 19.

== Career ==
In 2011, Linder portrayed a young Leonardo DiCaprio for the Candy magazine as her first modeling job. In subsequent years, Linder has modeled masculine, feminine and unisex looks for Tom Ford, Louis Vuitton and other houses and publications. In 2013, she appeared in the lyric video for Katy Perry's song "Unconditionally". In 2014, she played a male and a female part in an advertising campaign for Sweden's JC Jeans Company. In 2015, she appeared in the music video for the Of Monsters and Men song "Empire".

In 2016, Linder made her acting debut in the Canadian erotic lesbian drama film Below Her Mouth in a starring role. In the movie, directed by April Mullen, she portrayed a lesbian woman working as a roofer in Canada.

== Personal life ==
After starting her modeling career, Linder moved to Los Angeles. She is a lesbian.
