= Carolina Bartczak =

Canadian actress

- Born: Carolina Anna Bartczak; October 5, 1985 (age 40); Gehrden, West Germany
- Education: University of Toronto; Neighborhood Playhouse School of the Theatre
- Occupation: Actress
- Years active: 2010–present

Carolina Bartczak (born October 5, 1985) is a Canadian actress. She is known for her role as Magda Gurzsky, the wife of Erik Lehnsherr/Magneto, in X-Men: Apocalypse and Lily Kryger in the Netflix series Painkiller. She will also star as Abigail Walker in the upcoming release of the CBC series Plan B in August 2025.

== Early life ==
Carolina Bartczak was born in Germany after her parents escaped the martial law in Poland. She eventually emigrated to Canada with her family and grew up in Kitchener, Ontario. She studied biochemistry at the University of Toronto and worked as a travel writer/photographer in southern Croatia. She turned to acting in 2009 and attended the Neighborhood Playhouse School of the Theatre in New York City. Carolina Bartczak has dual citizenship between Canada and Poland and speaks French and Polish fluently.

== Career ==
Carolina Bartczak's first role was playing the voice of Alfred Hedgehog in the cartoon The Mysteries of Alfred Hedgehog. Her first on screen role was playing a high maintenance mother opposite Brendan Gleeson, and Neil Patrick Harris in The Smurfs 2. Bartczak also played Nurse Clara in the action film Brick Mansions opposite Paul Walker and as Amanda Dean in the film Business Ethics opposite Larenz Tate. Her most famous role was Magda Gurzsky, the wife of Erik Lehnsherr in X-Men: Apocalypse. In 2018, she was cast as the lead in a film by the CBC, An Audience of Chairs written by Rosemary House. Carolina Bartczak plays Maura, a beautiful woman suffering from mental illness based on a novel of the same name written by Joan Clark. The film was released in Canada on March 22, 2019. Carolina played the role of Brenda Lopez, starring opposite Halle Berry, Patrick Wilson, Charlie Plummer, and Michael Peña in the Roland Emmerich 2022 Sci-Fi action film, Moonfall by Lionsgate.

In 2024, she was announced as starring in the upcoming third season of the anthology drama series Plan B.

== Filmography ==
Film, Television and Gaming Roles
Year	Title	Role	Notes
2010	The Mysteries of Alfred Hedgehog	Alfred Hedgehog (voice)	TV series
2011	RoomBuds	Carly	Short film
2011	Screwed	Mirabel	TV series
2011	Crazy Photographer	Ivanka Trovovich	Feature film
2011	Wilt	Red Dress Girl	Feature film
2012	Covert Affairs	Debra	TV series
2013	Karma's a Bitch	Kaira	TV series
2013	The Listener	Sarah Wembley	TV series
2013	The Smurfs 2	Peanut Mom	Feature film
2013	Plato's Reality Machine	Maggie	Feature film
2014	Brick Mansions	Nurse Clara	Feature film
2014	Femme Brulee	Colleen Zimmerman	Short film
2015	Gray Area	Nina	Short film
2015	The Secret Life of Marilyn Monroe	Phyllis	TV series
2015	Mayday	Lauren Bessette	TV series
2016	Business Ethics	Amanda Dean	Feature film
2016	Cleverly Disguised	Dana	Short film
2016	X-Men: Apocalypse	Magda Gurzsky	Feature film
2017	Rainbow Six Siege	Zofia Bosak	Video game
2017	An Audience of Chairs	Maura Mackenzie	Feature film
2018	The Bold Type	Eden	TV series
2018	Far Cry 5	Cult Leader	Video game
2019	Carter	Abigail	TV series
2019	White Lie	Magda	Feature film
2020	Most Dangerous Game	Wife	TV series
2020	Hall	Val	Feature film
2022	Moonfall	Brenda Lopez	Feature film
2023	Beacon 23	Dr. Ree Avalon	TV series
2023	Painkiller	Lily Kryger	TV series
2025	Plan B	Abigail Walker	
2026	The Voices of Our Mother	Therese	
