= The Voices of Our Mother =

2026 film by Mark O'Brien

- Theatrical release poster
- Directed by: Mark O'Brien
- Written by: Mark O'Brien
- Produced by: Christopher Giroux; Justin Rebelo
- Starring: Sheila McCarthy; Georgina Reilly; Mark O'Brien; Carolina Bartczak; Alex Ozerov-Meyer; Shawn Doyle
- Cinematography: Scott McClellan
- Edited by: Angela Jekums
- Music by: Andrew Staniland
- Production company: Vortex Productions
- Distributed by: Vortex Productions
- Release date: April 11, 2026 (Panic Fest)
- Running time: 93 minutes
- Country: Canada
- Language: English

The Voices of Our Mother is a Canadian horror film, directed by Mark O'Brien and released in 2026. The film centres on William (O'Brien), Annika (Georgina Reilly), Therese (Carolina Bartczak) and Martin (Alex Ozerov-Meyer), who return home when their mother Harriet (Sheila McCarthy) falls mysteriously ill, only to confront the discovery that their mother's illness may be of supernatural origins.

== Cast ==
- Sheila McCarthy as Harriet
- Georgina Reilly as Annika
- Mark O'Brien as William
- Carolina Bartczak as Therese
- Alex Ozerov-Meyer as Martin
- Shawn Doyle as Father Roslovic
- Mayko Nguyen as Elaine

== Production ==
The Voices of Our Mother was shot in Hamilton, Ontario, in 2024.

== Distribution ==
The film premiered at the Panic Fest film festival on April 11, 2026, followed by its Canadian premiere in Halifax, Nova Scotia, on June 13, 2026,

Vortex Productions released the film in Canada on Jue 12,2026. It was acquired by Shudder for distribution in the United States, United Kingdom, Australia and New Zealand, releasing it on June 19, 2026. It is set to be released on VOD and digital in Canada on July 21, 2026.
