= Kevin Hanchard =

Canadian actor

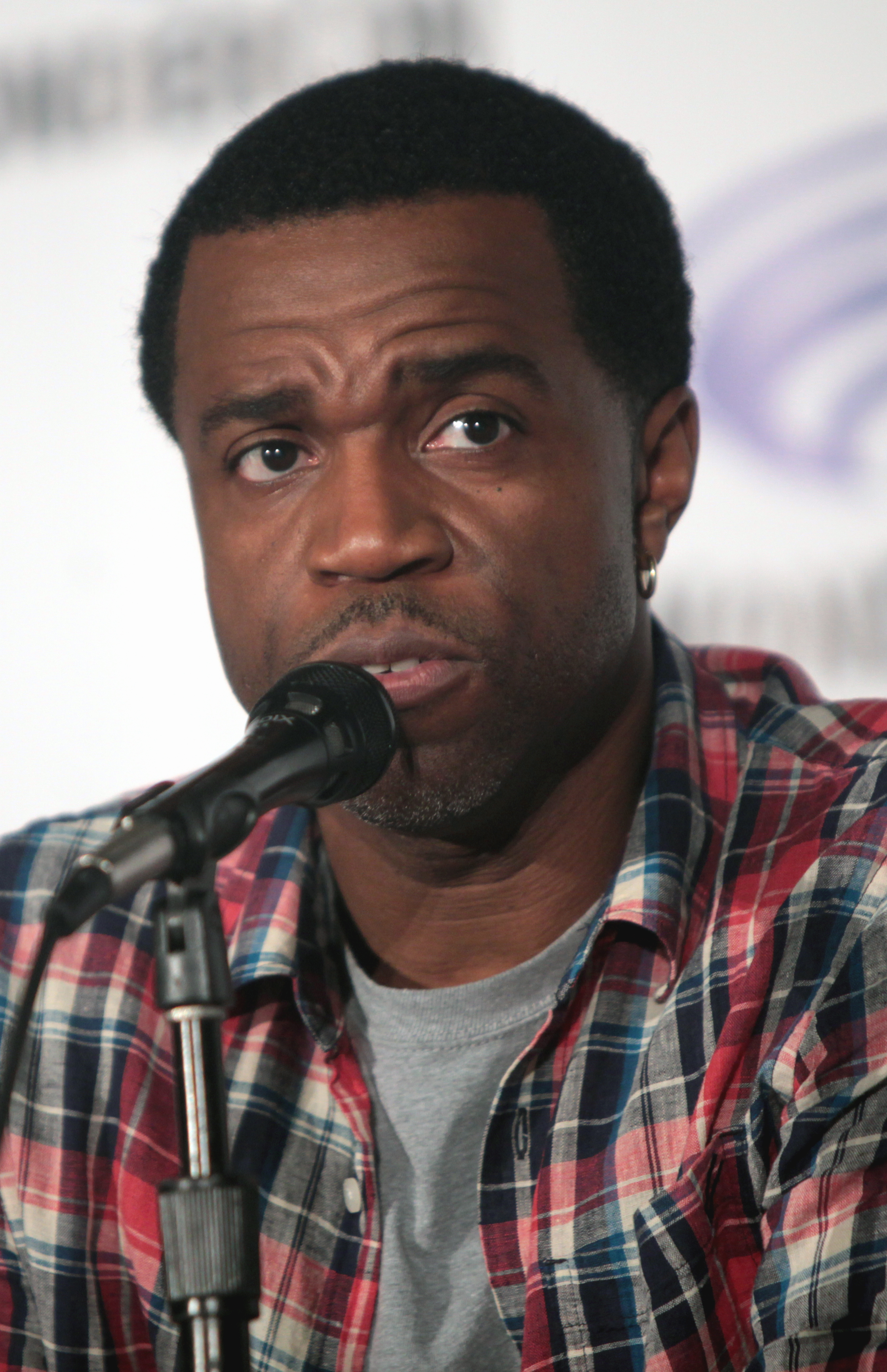
- Hanchard in 2016
- Born: July 4, 1974 (age 52); Toronto, Ontario, Canada
- Education: University of Windsor (BFA)
- Occupation: Actor
- Years active: 1998–present
- Known for: Orphan Black
- Spouse: Christine Hanchard (m. 2004)

Kevin Hanchard (born July 4, 1974) is a Canadian actor, best known for his roles as Detective Arthur Bell in Orphan Black and Inspector Sematimba in The Expanse. Hanchard currently appears as Superintendent Joseph Donovan in Hudson and Rex.

== Early life ==
Hanchard was born in Toronto, Ontario, on July 4, 1974, to Jamaican immigrants. He graduated from University of Windsor, with a degree for Bachelor of Fine Arts.

== Career ==
On stage, Hanchard is known primarily for his performances at the Stratford Festival and the Shaw Festival, including productions of Fuenteovejuna, Macbeth, Julius Caesar, A Midsummer Night's Dream, Topdog/Underdog, The Millionairess and His Girl Friday. He is a two-time nominee for the Dora Mavor Moore Award for Outstanding Performance by a Male in a Principal Role – Play, in 2009 for Miss Julie: Freedom Summer and in 2011 for Topdog / Underdog as well as was a shortlisted nominee in the Best Supporting Actor in a Drama Series category for Orphan Black at the 2nd Canadian Screen Awards.

== Filmography ==
=== Film ===
Year	Title	Role	Notes
2005	Four Brothers	Baffled Cop	
2006	Take the Lead	Woodley	
2007	This Beautiful City	Father	
2011	Family Man	Paul	
2012	Dream House	Sergeant Johnson	Uncredited
2014	Jihad Gigolo	Miled Mannered Man	Short
2014	Guidance	Principal Newman	
2015	Born to Be Blue	Dizzy Gillespie	
2016	Suicide Squad	Casino Boss	
2016	Fox Trouble	Arnold	Short
2017	It's Not My Fault and I Don't Care Anyway	Edward	
2017	Accidentals	Darryl	Short
2017	Wish Upon	Carl Morris	
2019	From the Vine	John	
2019	Rabid	Dr. Riley	
2023	The Wall Street Boy (Kipkemboi)	Officer Saitoti	
2025	Savvy Sheldon Feels Good As Hell	Ken	Television film

=== Television ===
Year	Title	Role	Notes
1998	Due South	Paramedic (Uncredited)	1 Episode: #4.2
1999	Tales from the Cryptkeeper	Marry Anne's Dad (Voice)	1 Episode: #3.2
2000	Hendrix	Little Richard	Television Movie
2002	Mom's on Strike	Secretary	Television Movie
2003	America's Prince: The John F. Kennedy Jr. Story	Lawyer	Television Movie
2003	Jasper, Texas	Thurman Bryd	Television Movie
2005	Metropia	Cory	1 Episode: #1.58
2005	The Eleventh Hour (Original Title) AKA Bury the Lead	Bobby Andrews	1 Episode: #3.9
2005–06	Missing	Agent Rich Hamilton	Guest: 2 Episodes
2006	At the Hotel	Quarlet #3	Guest: 2 Episodes
2006	Naturally, Sadie	Wayne	1 Episode: #2.7
2006	Runaway	English Teacher	1 Episode: #1.1
2006	The State Within	Boston FBI Agent	1 Episode: #1.6
2006	Love You to Death	Detective #2	1 Episode: #1.6
2007	Savage Planet	Vickers	Television Movie
2009	The Listener	Mark Petrie	1 Episode: #1.7
2010	H.M.S.: White Coat	Dr. Goldman	Television Movie
2010	Blue Mountain State	Father West	1 Episode: #2.3
2011	Degrassi: The Next Generation	Pest Control Manager	1 Episode: #11.10
2012	The Firm	Greg Hathaway	1 Episode: #1.10
2012	Republic of Doyle	Luke Shaw	Guest: 2 Episodes
2013	Nikita	Chief of Security	1 Episode: #3.15
2013	Saving Hope	Doug Wilkins	1 Episode: #2.3
2013	Suits	Colonel Mariga	Guest: 3 Episodes
2013	Lucky 7	Hank Langley	1 Episode: #1.2
2013–17	Orphan Black	Detective Art Bell	Main: 44 (Season 1–5)
2014	Apple Mortgage Cake	Melvin George	Television Movie
2015	The Strain	Curtis Fitzwilliam	Guest: 2 Episodes
2015	Hemlock Grove	Federal Agent Morgan	1 Episode: #3.1
2015–17	Rogue	Nate Lowry	Recurring: 20 Episodes (Season 3–4)
2016	The Stepchild	Police Officer	Television Movie
2016	The Girlfriend Experience	Jim Slater	1 Episode: #1.11
2016	Atomic Puppet	The Mayor	Recurring: 21 Episodes (Season 1)
2016	Conviction	Jack Braemer	1 Episode: #1.9
2016–17	The Expanse	Inspector Sematimba	Recurring: 5 Episodes (Season 1–2)
2017	Tin Star	Reverend Gregoire	Recurring: TBA
2017	Annedroids	Nick's Dad	Guest: 2 Episodes
2017	Wynonna Earp	Moody	Guest: 2 Episodes
2017	21 Thunder	Scout	
2018	Cardinal	Sergeant Alan Clegg	6 episodes
2018	The Detail		Guest: 1 episode
2018	Impulse	Dr. Jack Weakley	Guest: 2 episodes
2019	Wayne	Sergeant Randall	Guest: 1 episode
2019–present	Hudson & Rex	Joseph Donovan	Main cast, Directed 3 Episodes
2021	Ginny & Georgia	Corbin	1 episode: #1.5
2022	The Porter	Popsy	Recurring Role

=== Video games ===
Year	Title	Role	Notes
2016	Watch Dogs 2		Voice
2020	The Dark Pictures Anthology: Little Hope	Vince	Voice
