= Below Her Mouth =

2016 film directed by April Mullen

- Theatrical release poster
- Directed by: April Mullen
- Written by: Stephanie Fabrizi
- Produced by: Melissa Coghlan
- Starring: Erika Linder; Natalie Krill; Sebastian Pigott; Mayko Nguyen; Tommie-Amber Pirie; Melanie Leishman; Andrea Stefancikova
- Cinematography: Maya Bankovic
- Edited by: Michelle Szemberg
- Music by: NOIA
- Production company: Serendipity Point Films
- Distributed by: Serendipity Point Films
- Release date: September 10, 2016 (TIFF)
- Running time: 92 minutes
- Country: Canada
- Language: English
- Box office: $36,240

Below Her Mouth is a 2016 Canadian erotic romantic drama film directed by April Mullen and written by Stephanie Fabrizi. The film stars Natalie Krill as Jasmine and Erika Linder as Dallas, 2 women in Toronto who meet and begin an intense and passionate love affair. The cast also includes Tommie-Amber Pirie, Mayko Nguyen, Elise Bauman, Melanie Leishman, and Sebastian Pigott.

== Plot ==
While having sex with her girlfriend Joslyn, a roofer named Dallas finds herself sexually frustrated by not being able to fully have an orgasm while Joslyn has a massive one. Despite Joslyn's pleas, Dallas breaks up with her. Meanwhile, Jasmine, a successful fashion designer, engaged to a man named Rile, spots Dallas working on a neighbourhood roof and immediately gets a bit intrigued with her presence. Rile leaves Jasmine behind while going on a business trip. Later that night Jasmine goes to a lesbian bar with her friend Claire, to be her wing woman. While in the bar's bathroom, Jasmine meets Dallas who finds herself to be immediately attracted to Jasmine.

Dallas soon hits on Jasmine, despite the latter telling her that she's engaged and tries to excuse herself to find Claire, only to find that her friend is already dancing and making out with another woman. Jasmine leaves, only to have Dallas follow her and make out with her. While Jasmine initially resists, it soon becomes consensual, and she kisses Dallas back before finally stopping and making Claire leave with her. Claire tells Jasmine not to worry about the kiss. The next morning after Dallas leaves for work, it is shown that she is currently working on roofing the house next to Jasmine's. Jasmine soon starts to find herself attracted to Dallas as well; failing to resist, she starts to masturbate in the bathtub through the water while thinking about Dallas, and climaxes.

Although Jasmine rejects Dallas once again while on her way to work, seeing a naked woman model for her soon awakens a lust for Jasmine that makes her finally admit defeat and agrees to have one date with Dallas. At the bar, Dallas tries to get intimate with Jasmine, leaning in to kiss her, telling her to come to her place. Jasmine leaves, frustrated with herself as much as with Dallas. Dallas follows her into the alleyway and pins her against the wall. "Stop torturing yourself," she says. "You're torturing me," Jasmine fires back. Dallas kisses her on the lips, deliberately, trying to break her resolve. Jasmine doesn't reciprocate at first, holding herself rigid. Then something snaps. She smiles, just briefly, and kisses Dallas back, hard. The two keep kissing until a garbage man rounds the corner; they laugh and move to the back of Dallas's truck, where the kissing continues. Dallas begins touching her extremely intensely, trying to go down on her, but Jasmine stops her, not out of reluctance this time, but urgency. She asks Dallas to "take her somewhere". Dallas does. Back at her apartment, Dallas wastes no time, she takes off Jasmine's underwear, places her on the table, and goes down on her. Jasmine is reluctant at first, but her body overrides her hesitation; she moans and shivers with each of Dallas's touches, and eventually orgasms. She pulls Dallas up and kisses her on the lips. Then, for the first time, Jasmine takes off Dallas's shirt and touches her intimately. They move to the refrigerator. Dallas pulls her pants down slightly to reveal a strap-on. Jasmine is momentarily shocked, then more intrigued than anything, realizing Dallas must have been packing it since the beginning of the date. "Do you want me to take it off?" Dallas asks. Jasmine looks down and signals no. Dallas takes the cue, lifts Jasmine's leg, and positions the strap-on carefully. They begin moving together, rhythmically, intensely. Jasmine gets more and more aroused and pulls Dallas closer. Dallas thrusts harder until they climax together for the first time. Jasmine smiles, then kisses her. They kiss their way through the apartment, up the short stairs and onto the bed. Dallas takes off her pants and the strap-on. Jasmine peels off her bodycon, revealing her naked body. The two kiss completely bare, Dallas on top. They move together in the missionary position, Jasmine moaning once they find their rhythm, moving like clockwork, chasing the orgasm again. Dallas thrusts hard and they climax a second time, harder than the first. In the stillness that follows, it hits Jasmine, that she has cheated on her fiancé. She starts to tear up, not knowing herself whether they are happy tears or guilty ones. She pulls Jasmine close and kisses her softly until the tears settle. Eventually, they doze off together.

After waking up in the morning, Jasmine realises again what had happened last night. She sees around the room to find her and Dallas’ clothes lying around in the room, but Dallas is nowhere to be found. A distressed Jasmine gets a call from Rile and while initially feeling guilty, decides not to tell him what has happened. Dallas arrives and Jasmine hangs up the call shortly after. After hanging up, Dallas and Jasmine start to get to know each other more with Dallas telling her how she became a roofer and Jasmine revealing that she once had feelings for another girl when she was younger, but decided not to pursue this after her mother found out. While spending the day together, Jasmine reveals how she once had an amazing opportunity in her career, but turned it down as it would have required her to move; she had sacrificed it for Rile who also gained a similar chance with his work, to which Dallas tells her she would have moved with Jasmine if they were in a relationship.

The next morning, Dallas wakes up before Jasmine and seeing her laying beside, it awakens her lust and she kisses her in her sleep. Jasmine wakes up and then the two start kissing. Dallas kisses Jasmine on her buttocks before caressing her and moving towards her breasts. Jasmine pushes Dallas to go down on her. Dallas gives her the cue and goes down while Jasmine holds her knees in pleasure. Jasmine flips Dallas over and starts to ride her face. Jasmine is seen in utterly pleasure as she rides Dallas' mouth and orgasms. Jasmine moves towards Dallas' vulva where they start tribbing. Dallas holds Jasmine by her waist and Jasmine rides her. Dallas presses their bodies together in pleasure and then they hug and kiss before Dallas lays again. Jasmine starts getting extremely pleasured as Dallas presses her left breast. Jasmine increases her pace of riding as she gets closer to her orgasm. She starts to lose control as Dallas balances her. Jasmine orgasms extremely hard while trying so hard not to crash, saying she "can't breathe", followed by Dallas' orgasming too. Dallas makes Jasmine lay close to her after the climax. They have a pillow talk where they get the most vulnerable and Jasmine claims that she doesn't want to get back to her old life. She asks Dallas to drive her home but Dallas tells her that she is going to "get them lost".

While dropping Jasmine back home, Dallas attempts to have sex one last time since Jasmine tells her they won't be able to see each other after that night. They makeout for awhile inside the car, as Jasmine reprimands Dallas not to get her going, but was later turned on by Dallas' attempts. Meanwhile, Rile calls Jasmine to inform her that he is coming home after a rainstorm caused his trip to be cancelled early and will see her soon before his expected time which was next morning. Jasmine's phone vibrated as the message was received but, she being too engaged with their kiss to notice, she proceeds to play with Dallas in the rain and share a deep passionate kiss before moving in the rain, towards her house. They go inside and start to undress each other while not stopping their kisses and touches. They move up the staircase while making out half naked, kissing and breathing hard in each other's skin, bodies in sync, full of yearning and wanting each other. Dallas takes off Jasmine's wet dress before throwing her towards her bed. Jasmine kisses her back but ends up saying "Not in here", after feeling uneasy having sex in the bed made for her and her fiance. They move their lovemaking towards the bathroom, where Dallas strips completely bare, down to her strap-on. Seeing this, it turns Jasmine even more on as she kisses Dallas more harder and takes her underwear off, both drowing in each other's lust. Dallas and Jasmine hold each other and stay in silent in the bathtub, to which Dallas tells her that she wants to see her again, to which Jasmine sadly replied "I can't." Hearing this, it made Dallas sad. but more lust filled within her for the night as she grabbed Jasmine up for a hard kiss, Jasmine knew the cue and started to kiss back, and getting up into position. Jasmine and Dallas get into the doggy-style position, with Jasmine being pleasured more than ever. Dallas looks more visibly dominant as she begans her thrusts and tries to grab Jasmine. She increases her thrusts and Jasmine moans more harder. They both didn't want the night to end, the lust and yearning drowning in one another. But before they could climax again, a unbeknownst Rile walks in on them, pokerfaced and staring at Jasmine, who didn't even notice him first. Jasmine was so into the sex that she got startled while seeing him, knowing she got caught. Jasmine accidentally turns the water on and curses as Rile leaves, with Jasmine chasing after him while Dallas goes back home. They broke into an argument, but it was not violent. The next morning, Rile speaks up about what happened. He told her that he was just a goner, implying that she must have been enjoying the sex very well, because she hasn't even noticed him coming in until he opened the door. Jasmine tries to make it up to Rile by following up that they were still the same, but Rile says that she's a lesbian and it doesn't matter. He agrees to forgive Jasmine if she breaks up with Dallas for good, which she does in Dallas' place, after sharing a heartbreaking farewell and a last kiss.

In the days that follow, the two women are shown to be miserable without each other. Dallas is once again sexually frustrated even after having an erotic encounter with a stripper one night, and, with no one to go to, finds herself asleep in her ex's doorstep, where Joslyn takes her in. Rile asks Jasmine why she was never passionate like that with him. The morning after in the bathroom, Jasmine apologizes for what she did and Rile comforts her. They take time being intimate, attempting to have sex, but when he put himself inside her, Jasmine cries after knowing that she will never be the same fiancée for him, ever again.

Sometime later, Dallas and Jasmine meet up where they reconcile as Jasmine reveals she told her friends everything about Dallas.

== Cast ==
- Erika Linder as Dallas
- Natalie Krill as Jasmine
- Sebastian Pigott as Rile
- Mayko Nguyen as Joslyn
- Tommie-Amber Pirie as Quinn
- Melanie Leishman as Claire
- Andrea Stefancikova as M.J.
- Daniela Barbosa as Desiree
- Elise Bauman as Bridget
- Jocelyn Hudon as Nikki
- Aneesa Badshaw as Exotic dancer

== Production ==
The film was shot in Toronto over a period of three and a half weeks in 2015 with an all-female production crew, and subsequently premiered at the 2016 Toronto International Film Festival, followed by a simultaneous release in the United States on April 28, 2017.

== Critical reception ==
The film received generally negative reviews from critics. On the review aggregator website Rotten Tomatoes, 21% of 28 critics' reviews are positive, with an average rating of 4.5/10. The website's consensus reads: "Below Her Mouth delivers two understated performances of intrigue leading the way for gratuitous erotica with no plot, no character development, unsavory dialogue, and enough nudity to bore." Metacritic, which uses a weighted average, assigned the film a score of 42 out of 100, based on 9 critics, indicating "mixed or average" reviews.

Diego Semerene of Slant Magazine gave the film 0.5 stars out of 4, writing, "The film is an unquestionably pornographic fantasy barely trying to pass as something other than masturbation material." He added, "Below Her Mouth's stiff acting and dialogue suggest a misguided Blue Is the Warmest Colour influence reduced to the sexy aesthetics of lesbian sex but completely oblivious to that which actually animates the film's impossibly beautiful, unbearably smooth, and perpetually horny bodies." Guy Lodge of Variety described it as "a sexually frank but narratively flimsy girl-meets-girl romance that never gets under its gorgeous characters' amply exposed skin." Frank Scheck of The Hollywood Reporter called it "an undeniably steamy effort that delivers plenty of heat in its sex scenes, while falling significantly short in dramatic terms."

Katie Walsh of the Los Angeles Times said: "Despite the female filmmakers at the helm, the film treads into exploitative territory, with the ratio of screen time given to writhing female bodies far outweighing that given to their unique experiences as gay or closeted women in the world." Jude Dry of Indiewire wrote: "What, exactly, is below her mouth? Her chin? Her body? Her entire mind and spirit? It's a fittingly ambiguous title for a directionless film, late night fare that will be enjoyed by just as many horny men as horny teenage lesbians."

== Home media ==
The film was made available as video on demand on Amazon Video on April 29, 2017; followed by Netflix on August 1, 2017.

== See also ==
- List of LGBT-related films directed by women
