= Natalie Krill =

Canadian actress (born 1983)

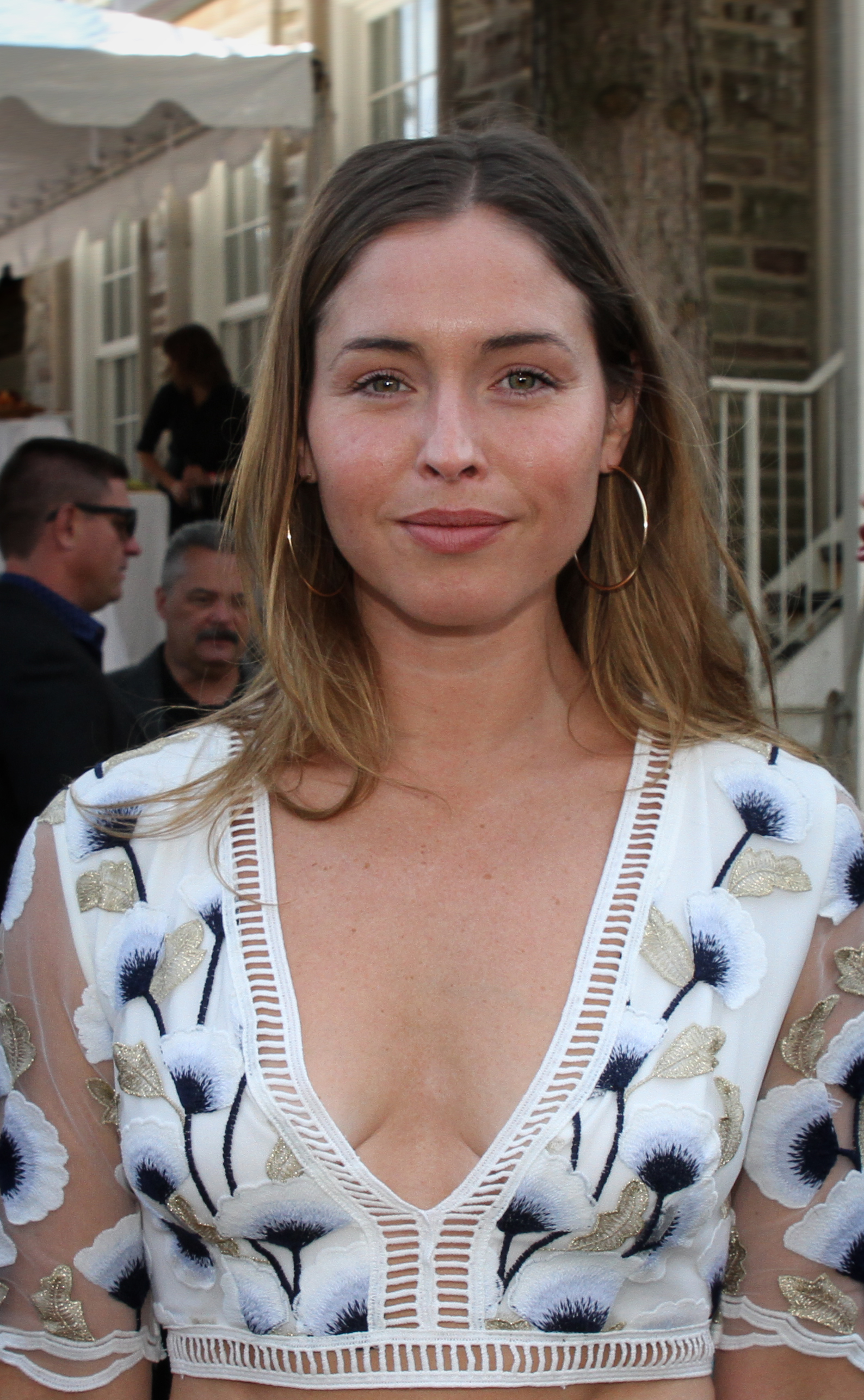
- Krill in 2017
- Born: February 4, 1983 (age 43); Saskatchewan, Canada
- Occupation: Actress
- Years active: 2005–present
- Spouse: Daniel Kannimäe
- Children: 3

Natalie Krill (born February 4, 1983) is a Canadian actress and former dancer. She appeared in the hockey drama MVP and in the independent film Below Her Mouth.

== Early life ==
Natalie Krill was born and raised in Saskatchewan, daughter of Rose Ray Krill and maternal granddaughter of Ruth Treiberg, Swedish, and is of Swedish, Estonian, and Ukrainian descent. She enjoyed the arts at an early age, encouraged by her mother. Krill signed herself up for dance lessons at age 6, and studied ballet, tap, and jazz dance until she was 18 years old, at which point she moved to Toronto to pursue an acting career.

== Career ==
Krill has appeared as Lorraine Fleming in the Moscow production of the musical 42nd Street; the play based on the film Dirty Dancing when it made its North American premiere in Toronto in the fall of 2008; and the film Hollywoodland. She has been seen in the role of Alex Kendrick in The Listener and in the role of Phoebe on the Canadian family channel show The Next Step. In 2016, she co-starred in April Mullen's independent film Below Her Mouth, which was an official selection at the Toronto International Film Festival, despite lukewarm reception from film critics.

== Personal life ==
Following her role in the erotic lesbian drama Below Her Mouth, Krill anticipated questions about her sexuality, and she told a journalist, "Personally, I'm open. Like I don't feel the need to label myself and I believe love is love."

She and her husband Daniel Kannimäe have three children.

== Filmography ==
Film roles
| Year | Title | Role | Notes |
|---|---|---|---|
| 2006 | Hollywoodland | Camera Girl | |
| 2010 | Casino Jack | Flight Attendant (Crystal) | |
| 2013 | Make Your Move | Live Blogger | |
| 2015 | After the Ball | Tannis | |
| 2015 | Remember | Boise Holiday Inn Receptionist | |
| 2016 | Below Her Mouth | Jasmine | |
| 2017 | Molly's Game | Winston | |
| 2018 | SuperGrid | North | |
| 2019 | We Had It Coming | Anna | |

Television roles
| Year | Title | Role | Notes |
|---|---|---|---|
| 2005 | Twitches | Salesgirl | Television film |
| 2008 | MVP | Molly McBride | Main role |
| 2010 | Turn the Beat Around | Maeve | Television film |
| 2010 | Covert Affairs | Woman in Bar / Louise | Episode: "Pilot" |
| 2010 | Warehouse 13 | Jenny | Episode: "Age Before Beauty" |
| 2010 | Rookie Blue | Edie Larson | 3 episodes |
| 2010 | The Ron James Show | Maid of Honor | Episode: "2.1" |
| 2011 | Good Dog | Receptionist | Episode: "Under the Knife" |
| 2011 | Desperately Seeking Santa | Brittany | Television film |
| 2011 | Wishing Well | Bonnie | Television film |
| 2012 | Sunshine Sketches of a Little Town | Myra Thorpe | Television film |
| 2012 | Suits | Sarah Hardman | Episode: "She Knows" |
| 2012 | Saving Hope | Trisha | Episode: "Heartsick" |
| 2013 | Satisfaction | Kathy | Episode: "No Money, No Problems" |
| 2014 | Seed | Susan Bechdel | Episode: "Consenting Adults" |
| 2014 | The Listener | Alex Kendrick | Recurring role (season 5); 11 episodes |
| 2014–2015 | Remedy | Natasha | Recurring role; 4 episodes |
| 2014–2016 | The Next Step | Phoebe | Recurring role; 29 episodes |
| 2015 | Man Seeking Woman | Katie | Episode: "Teacup" |
| 2015 | Orphan Black | Patty | 2 episodes |
| 2015 | Riftworld Chronicles | Nurse | Miniseries |
| 2016 | Houdini & Doyle | Amelia | Episode: "Necromanteion" |
| 2016 | Wynonna Earp | Eve / Willa Earp | Recurring role; 4 episodes |
| 2016 | Beauty & the Beast | Dr. Paretti / Aline Paretti | Episode: "Beast of Times, Worst of Times" |
| 2017 | The Girlfriend Experience | Unnamed Friend | Episode: "Solicitation" |
| 2019 | Good Witch | Marion | Episode: “Match Game” |
