= Hall (film) =

- Directed by: Francesco Giannini
- Written by: Derrick Adams; Adam Kolodny
- Story by: Francesco Giannini
- Cinematography: Graham Guertin Santerre
- Music by: Michael Vignola
- Production company: Franky Films
- Release date: August 30, 2020 (FrightFest)
- Running time: 80 minutes
- Country: Canada
- Languages: English; Japanese

Hall, also stylized as HALL, is a 2020 Canadian mystery horror film that was directed by Francesco Giannini.

== Synopsis ==
Two women, each dealing with unhappy marriages, find themselves trapped in a hotel hallway as a deadly airborne virus ravages the hotel clientele and the outside world.

== Cast ==
- Julian Richings as Julian
- Carolina Bartczak as Val
- Yumiko Shaku as Naomi
- Vlasta Vrana as Peter
- Christopher James Giannini as Piano man
- Dawn Ford as Christine
- Mark Gibson as Branden
- Kathleen Fee as Betty
- Bailey Thain as Kelly
- Val Mervis as Dianne
- Genti Bejko as Jonah
- Kim Richardson as Dolores

== Production ==
Director Francesco Giannini became interested in Hall after being approached by screenwriter Adam Kolodny. Giannini had previously worked with co-writer Derrick Adams and was intrigued by the question "what would happen if vaccines were created intentionally for purposes of government control and for the profit of the pharmaceutical industry, not necessarily to cure viruses?" The film marked the feature film directorial debut of Giannini, who had previously directed short movies and worked as an actor and extra.

Actress Yumiko Shaku was brought on to portray Naomi, one of the film's protagonists. Giannini has noted that Shaku was "an integral part in getting HALL made" and that "Without Yumiko’s involvement, the film would not have the same impact." Filming took place in a working hotel over twelve days and used primarily practical effects, as Giannini wanted it to be "an ode to the older horror films from the ’70s and ’80s that helped inspire my love of cinema".

== Release ==
Hall premiered on August 30, 2020, at FrightFest.

== Reception ==
Hall has a rating of 80% on review aggregator Rotten Tomatoes, based on 10 reviews. Common elements of praise centered around Giannini's choice of filming location, acting, and the movie's premise. Ginger Nuts of Horror also praised the themes of domestic abuse, writing that they "play very well with a realistic subtly more akin to these actual relationships." Criticism focused upon the script, which Flickering Myth felt was "shockingly padded" and Ginger Nuts of Horror wrote "needed another solid rewrite to tackle obvious storytelling issues."
