= Deanne Foley =

Canadian director, writer and producer

- Born: Deanne Catherine Foley; St. John's, Newfoundland and Labrador, Canada
- Education: Memorial University
- Occupations: Director, Producer, Writer
- Years active: 1998-Present

Deanne Catherine Foley is a Canadian director, writer and producer. She has directed both narrative and documentary films of feature and short length. Her films often centre around flawed female leads and are usually filmed in Atlantic Canada. She has also worked in the television industry, directing episodes for a variety of series. She is best known for her films An Audience of Chairs, Relative Happiness and Beat Down, which received a number of awards, as well as exposure at a number of higher profile film festivals.

== Biography ==
Foley was born and raised in St. John's, Newfoundland during the 1970s. She received her Bachelor of Arts in English in 1995 from the Memorial University of Newfoundland. During her university years, she became interested in becoming a filmmaker after attending the St. John's International Women's Film Festival.

She is the mother of two children and currently lives in St. John's, Newfoundland.

== Career ==
=== Early career ===
In 1998, she moved to Halifax to search for opportunities in the film industry. Her first short film, Trombone Trouble, debuted at the Atlantic Film Festival in 2000. The film is a comedic short in which a girl attempts to get rid of her trombone after her parents force her to take lessons. In Canada, the film was broadcast on CBC and The Comedy Network, and screened at a number of film festivals. In 2002, she returned to St. John's and produced the short film, This Boy, for which she received the Best Canadian Female Short award at Toronto's Inside Out Film Festival. Also in the early 2000s, Foley worked as a field producer and video journalist for two CBC news series: ZeD and Street Cents, where she specialized in reports on Newfoundland. In 2009, she directed her second short film, The Magnificent Molly McBride. It won the Audience Choice Award at the 2010 Nickel Independent Film Festival in St. John's.

=== Feature films ===
In 2012, Foley's first feature film, Beat Down, was released. She directed and co-wrote the film. The film is a comedy about a teenager named Fran (played by Marthe Bernard) who hopes to become a professional wrestler like her parents, despite her father's disapproval. The film garnered positive reviews and was nominated for three Canadian Comedy Awards, including one for Foley's directing. It was also named "Best of the Fest" at the Cinequest Film Festival in San Jose, California, where it made its debut.

Her second feature film, Relative Happiness, was a Nova Scotia-Newfoundland co-production. The film is based on the novel of the same name by Cape Breton writer Lesley Crewe and stars Melissa Bergland, Aaron Poole and Susan Kent. Foley wrote the screenplay along with Iain MacLeod, Sherry White and Crewe. They opted to make the film more comedic than the novel in order for it to become a romantic comedy. The film's plot centres around Lexie (played by Bergland), a bed and breakfast owner who sets out to find love. Foley shot the film in Halifax over 16 days in Fall 2013. It had a budget of $1.25 million and was funded by Telefilm Canada. The film debuted May 15, 2014 at the Cannes Film Festival as part of Telefilm Canada's Perspective Canada Cannes program. Foley, along with the rest of her directing team, were nominated by the Directors Guild of Canada for the DGC Team Award for their work on the project.

=== Television ===
Foley also has experience with directing television series. In 2014, she directed two episodes of the CBC television series Republic of Doyle. Prior to that she had directed episodes for other television series, such as KinK, a documentary series where people share their sexual fantasies and beliefs, and A Guy and a Girl, a comedy series that aired on the W Network. She was also the creator and one of the directors of the television documentary series, Going the Distance, which aired in 2004 on Global Television. The show chronicled the lives of 13 different couples who were in long-term relationships.

== Awards and honours ==
Foley is a member of the Directors Guild of Canada, as well as the Writers Guild of Canada, WIFT (Women in Film and Television)-Atlantic and NIFCO (Newfoundland Independent Film Makers Co-Op Ltd). She won the award for Best Debut Feature at the Female Eye Film Festival for her work on the film Beat Down. In 2015, she was awarded Artist of the Year at the Newfoundland and Labrador Arts Council Awards. She won the 2020 Wave Award from WIFT-Atlantic.

== Filmography ==
=== Films ===
Year	Title	Role	Notes
1999	The Diary Found by a Nasty Kid	Associate Producer	Short film
2000	Trombone Trouble	Writer/Director	Short film
2002	This Boy	Producer	Short film
2005	Boys on the Fringe	Writer/Director	Documentary short film
2009	The Magnificent Molly McBride	Writer/Director	Short film
2012	Beat Down	Writer/Director	First feature film
2014	Sadie	Producer	Short film
2014	Relative Happiness	Co-writer/Director	Feature film
2018	An Audience of Chairs	Director	Feature film
2019	The Death of Winter	Executive Producer	Short film
2019	Radical	Director	Short film
2019	Christmas Reservations	Director	TV movie

=== Television ===
Year	Title	Role	Notes
2004	Going the Distance	Creator/Director	Documentary series
2006	KinK	Field Director	13 episodes
2014	Republic of Doyle	Director	7 episodes
2022	Hudson and Rex	Director	5 episodes
2022	Son of a Critch	Director	16 episodes
