= Mayko Nguyen =

Canadian actress

- Born: April 19, 1980 (age 46); Vancouver, Canada
- Occupation: Actress
- Known for: Hudson & Rex, ReGenesis

Mayko Nguyen is a Canadian actress. She has appeared in ReGenesis, Rookie Blue, Killjoys, Titans and Hudson & Rex.

== Biography ==
Mayko Nguyen was born in Vancouver on Canada’s west coast and grew up there with her Vietnamese Canadian family. She decided to pursue acting after performing in a production of William Shakespeare's play A Midsummer Night's Dream while in Grade 11 at secondary school. She currently lives in Toronto.

Nguyen has had lead and recurring roles on a variety of television series, including Bloodletting and Miraculous Cures, Cracked and Slasher. Among Nguyen's most notable television roles are Mayko Tran on ReGenesis, Sue Tran on Rookie Blue and Delle Seyah Kendry on Killjoys. Currently she stars in the Citytv show Hudson & Rex, a serial police drama where she plays a police forensicist.

Nguyen's film work includes Going the Distance, The Last New Year, and Below Her Mouth.

Nguyen is also a stage actress, and performed in The Unending during the 2016 Toronto Fringe Festival; and David French's two hander play Salt-Water Moon, in the spring of 2016. Salt-Water Moon went on to be named "Best Toronto Theatre Production of the Decade" by NOW magazine.

Nguyen's voice work includes the video games Far Cry New Dawn and Far Cry 5. She also voices Ms. Furi in Spin Master's animated Netflix series Unicorn Academy.

In 2008, Nguyen was nominated at the ACTRA awards for "Outstanding Female Performance" for her role as Mayko Tran in ReGenesis, and nominated for "Best Lead in a Drama Series" at the Canadian Screen Awards consecutively in 2023 and 2024, for her role as Sarah in Hudson & Rex.

== Filmography ==
Year	Title	Role	Notes
2004	Going the Distance	Jill	Feature film
2004	Tilt	Cathy Kwan	Guest role (season 1)
2004 - 2008	ReGenesis	Mayko Tran	Main role (seasons 1 - 4)
2005	Lie with Me	Kika	Feature film
2006	Why I Wore Lipstick to My Mastectomy	Donna	Television film
2006	11 Cameras	Sarah	Main role (season 1)
2006 - 2008	Rent-a-Goalie	Stuart	Main role (seasons 1 - 3)
2008	Princess	Sophie Baxter	Television film
2009	Being Erica	Antigone Kim Morris	Guest role (seasons 1 & 3)
2009	The Listener	Jennifer	Guest role (season 1)
2010	This Movie Is Broken	Publicist	Feature film
2010	Bloodletting & Miraculous Cures	Ming	Miniseries
2011	Rookie Blue	Sue Tran	Recurring role (seasons 1 - 3)
2011	Against the Wall	Mackie Phan	Main role (season 1)
2011	Republic of Doyle	Dr. Annie Price	Guest role (season 2)
2012	Continuum	Dr. Melissa Dobeck	Guest role (season 1 Episode 4 "Matter of time")
2012	The Firm	Olivia Danville	Guest role (season 1)
2013	Cracked	Detective Liz Liette	Main role (seasons 1 - 2)
2013	Borealis	Hoshi	Television film
2014	Working the Engels	Emily	Guest role (season 1)
2015	Defiance	Volubela	Guest role (season 3)
2015 - 2019	Killjoys	Delle Seyah Kendry	Recurring (seasons 1 - 5)
2016	Slasher	Alison Sutherland	Recurring (season 1)
2016	Below Her Mouth	Joslyn	Feature film
2016	A Family Man	Teacher	Feature film
2016	Private Eyes	Vanessa	Guest role (season 1)
2017	Buckout Road	Stephanie Hancock	Feature film
2017	But I'm Chris Jericho!	Michelle Fainremy	Recurring role (season 2)
2017	Save Me	Bella	Guest role (season 1)
2018	Anon	Detective Dyer	Feature film
2018	Fahrenheit 451	Newscaster	Feature film
2019	Titans	Adeline Kane	Guest role (season 2)
2019 - present	Hudson & Rex	Sarah Truong	Main role
2021	The Righteous	Mary Hutton	
2026	The Voices of Our Mother	Elaine	
TBA!?	Begin Again †	Denise	Upcoming series (filming)

== Awards and nominations ==
Year	Award	Category	Work	Result
2007	Gemini Awards	Best Performance by an Actress in a Featured Supporting Role in a Dramatic Series	ReGenesis	Nominated
2008	ACTRA award	Outstanding Female Performance	ReGenesis	Nominated
2023	CSA Awards	Best Lead Performer in a Drama Series	Hudson & Rex	Nominated
2024	CSA Awards	Best Lead Performer in a Drama Series	Hudson & Rex	Nominated
