= Olympic Island Festival =

Music festival in Toronto

Coordinates: 43.62242°N 79.37465°W

The Olympic Island Festival was an annual rock concert that takes place on Toronto's Olympic Island. It was started in 2004 by Jay Ferguson of the band Sloan, when only Canadian musicians performed. In subsequent years, the festival has featured bands from other countries.

== Lineups ==
=== 2004 ===
August 7, 2004

- Death from Above 1979
- Arcade Fire
- Buck 65
- The Constantines
- Pilate (now known as Pilot Speed)
- The Stills
- Broken Social Scene
- Sam Roberts
- Sloan

=== 2005 ===
June 26, 2005

- Keren Ann
- Triumph of Lethargy
- The Most Serene Republic
- Do Make Say Think
- Metric
- Broken Social Scene
- Modest Mouse

=== 2006 ===
June 24, 2006

- J Mascis (of Dinosaur Jr)
- Raising the Fawn
- Feist
- Bloc Party
- Broken Social Scene

=== 2008 ===
June 7, 2008

- Young Galaxy
- Rogue Wave
- Death Cab for Cutie
- Stars

=== 2009 ===
The 2009 festival was cancelled in early May 2009. The event was cancelled because a strike by Toronto's municipal outside workers closed ferry service to the Toronto Islands. Broken Social Scene played a free show at Harbourfront on July 11, 2009, as an apology for the event's cancellation; this show was documented in Bruce McDonald's 2010 concert film This Movie Is Broken.

- Broken Social Scene
- Explosions in the Sky
- Apostle of Hustle
- Beach House
- Thunderheist
- Rattlesnake Choir

=== 2010 ===
June 19, 2010

- Pavement Broken Social Scene
- Band of Horses
- Beach House
- Timber Timbre
- Toronto Revue

August 14, 2010

- Arcade Fire
- Janelle Monáe
- The Sadies
