= Hudson & Rex =

Canadian police procedural television series

- Promotional poster prior to season 2
- Genre: Police procedural; Comedy drama
- Based on: Kommissar Rex by Peter Hajek; Peter Moser
- Showrunner: Ken Cuperus
- Directed by: Felipe Rodriguez; Alison Reid; John Vatcher
- Starring: John Reardon; Mayko Nguyen; Kevin Hanchard; Justin Kelly; Diesel vom Burgimwald; Luke Roberts
- Country of origin: Canada
- Original language: English
- No. of seasons: 9
- No. of episodes: 129

Production
- Executive producers: Oliver Bachert; Scott Garvie; Friedemann Goez; Paul Pope; Nataline Rodrigues; John Reardon
- Production location: St. John's, Newfoundland and Labrador
- Running time: 44 minutes
- Production companies: Shaftesbury; Pope Productions; Beta Film

Original release
- Network: Citytv
- Release: March 25, 2019 – present

Related
- Inspector Rex

Hudson & Rex is a Canadian police procedural television series based on the Austrian–Italian drama Kommissar Rex. Played by John Reardon, Detective Charlie Hudson is a policeman in the Major Crimes Division of the St. John's Police Department in Newfoundland. Played by Diesel vom Burgimwald and several of his relatives, Hudson's K-9 partner Rex is a German Shepherd dog who is a "highly trained, law enforcement animal" and is not a pet.

The Canadian television series premiered on Citytv on March 25, 2019. Filming began in October 2018 in St. John's, Newfoundland and Labrador. Season two premiered on September 24, 2019. In June 2020 it was announced on Breakfast Television that season three would begin production in July 2020, ensuring to work within provincial public health guidelines in respect to the COVID-19 pandemic in Canada. Season three premiered on January 5, 2021. Season four premiered on October 21, 2021. Season 5 was released in October 2022. The popular series made another successful run for season six. Hudson & Rex was renewed for a seventh season on June 12, 2024, which began airing on January 14, 2025.

Diesel vom Burgimwald was the original canine star who played Rex in Canada in seasons 1–6, and episodes 1 and 2 of season 7 until his unexpected death in August 2024. His nephews, Dillon and Dante, and a cousin, Dreamer, took over the leading role of Rex starting in season 7, episode 3. German Shepherds Izzy and Iko, also nephews of Diesel, had already been acting as stunt doubles for Rex's action scenes, and will continue to do so in season 8. Reardon did not appear in most of season 7 while he recovered from tonsil cancer. He was replaced by a new detective, Mark Hudson (Luke Roberts), for season 8. Reardon would return in season 9.

== Premise ==
Charlie Hudson holds the rank of Detective in the Major Crimes Division of the St. John's Police Department. As a child, Charlie read many mystery novels and had always wanted to be a police detective. Rex is a German Shepherd, originally in the K9 unit, whose first human partner had been killed while the two were pursuing a kidnapper. Instead of being retired as per the department's standard operating procedure for K9 officers whose human partners have died, Rex underwent an official assessment to determine if he could remain on duty without posing a danger to the public. Rex easily passed the assessment and, after a successful trial period with Charlie, was permanently transferred from the K9 unit to the Major Crimes Division. Since Charlie had never owned a dog, he had to receive some instruction in Rex's handling.

Rex has excellent senses of hearing and smell, allowing him to track suspects and materials (blood, drugs, poisons, etc.) by scent or sound. He can also comfort people in distress and chase down suspects in order to subdue them. These abilities are instrumental in helping Charlie advance the division's investigations, and the two receive further support from Superintendent Joseph Donovan, Forensics Chief Sarah Truong, and IT specialist Jesse Mills in gathering and interpreting evidence. Truong and Mills both become detectives in later seasons.

The first season begins after Charlie has returned to his hometown of St. John's, following a divorce from his unfaithful wife. The first case is a kidnapping. Most episodes feature different murders, each with unique twists. The background story of the teaming of Charlie and Rex is presented in the season three premiere.

Early in the seventh season, Charlie leaves St. John's in order to search for his brother, who has gone missing in Mexico. Donovan, Sarah, and Jesse look after Rex and work with him until the end of the season, when Mark Hudson – a detective with the Halifax police, and not related to Charlie – is transferred to the SJPD and partnered with Rex.

== Cast and characters ==
=== Main ===
- John Reardon as Detective Charlie Hudson (seasons 1–7, 9), Rex's partner
- Mayko Nguyen as Chief of Forensics (later Detective) Sarah Truong
- Kevin Hanchard as Superintendent Joseph "Joe" Donovan
- Justin Kelly as IT Specialist (later Detective) Jesse Mills
- Diesel vom Burgimwald (seasons 1–7) and Dillon, Dante, and Dreamer (seasons 7–8) as Rex, the German Shepherd Dog K-9 officer, Hudson's partner and law enforcement animal in the Major Crimes Division of the St John's Police Department (SJPD)
  - Is-He / Izzy, and Iko (seasons 1–7), action scene stunt doubles of Rex
- Luke Roberts as Detective Mark Hudson (season 8-9; guest season 7)

=== Supporting ===
- Raven Dauda as Sergeant Jan Renley, Rex's police trainer (seasons 1, 3, 5, 7)
- Amanda Arcuri as Camilla Donovan (seasons 1–2, 5)
- Richard Chevollou as P.I. David Mason (seasons 1–3, 5)
- Alan Doyle as Dalton (seasons 2–5)
- Andrew Bushell as Michael (seasons 4–5)
- Bridget Wareham as Dr. Karma Poole (season 5)
- Lanette Ware as Superintendent Vanessa Lewis (season 5)

== Episodes ==
Season	Episodes	Originally aired	
Season	Episodes	First aired	Last aired
1	13	March 25, 2019	July 25, 2019
2	19	September 24, 2019	March 24, 2020
3	16	January 5, 2021	April 20, 2021
4	16	October 7, 2021	April 19, 2022
5	20	September 25, 2022	April 25, 2023
6	16	October 4, 2023	April 30, 2024
7	8	January 14, 2025	March 11, 2025
8	14	September 22, 2025	March 3, 2026
9	12	October 5, 2026	

Seasons one and two combined have a total of 32 episodes according to distributor Beta. Season one filmed a total of 16 episodes but the last three episodes of season one became the first three episodes of season two. Season two also filmed 16 episodes.

=== Season 1 (2019) ===
No. overall	No. in season	Title	Directed by	Written by	Original release date	Prod. code	Canada viewers
1	1	"The Hunt"	Alison Reid	Ken Cuperus	March 25, 2019	101	222,000
St. John's police detective Charlie Hudson and his K9 partner Rex are witness to the abduction of young girl Evelyn Boonstra in broad daylight. Rex chases after the kidnappers and stows away in their pickup truck. Hudson and his team at SJPD's Major Crimes learns that Evelyn's father, Leonard, was a former hitman for the incarcerated Rupert Mankiewicz and tasked him to eliminate a witness testifying against him, this is despite Leonard having long since retired. The team tracks the kidnappers to Bell Island, where Rex assists in freeing Evelyn and later apprehend the kidnappers as Hudson and the team arrive on scene. IT specialist Jessie Mills is shot when attempting to protect the witness.
2	2	"Fearless Freaks"	Felipe Rodriguez	Ken Cuperus	April 1, 2019	102	297,000
Hudson and Rex investigate the death of parkour daredevil Birdy, later identified as Kyle Woods. His death was seemingly an accident, but Hudson and the team learns that he had actually died six hours before the fall. Through his friends, they reveal that Kyle died while they were passed out after partying. Ron Lake, the father of Kyle's fiancé, is revealed to have planted narcotics on him, but his results were clean. Upon learning that there was a fourth friend involved who was thought to be retired, Hudson learns that he had demanded they pay him back for assisting ins erting up their website. He confronted Kyle and killed him in self-defense. Hudson and Rex receive a complaint form his former training officer Renley, who thinks Hudson isn't competent to handle Rex. She later retracts her complaint and Hudson offers her to train him become a better handler for Rex.
3	3	"Haunted by the Past"	Felipe Rodriguez	Paul Aitken & Simon McNabb	April 8, 2019	103	240,000
Ghost Hunter Tyler Holden stumbles upon the unconscious body of Nancy Rubic in a graveyard. As Hudson and Rex investigate, they discover that she is the sister of Michael Rubic, a boy who went missing 20 years ago and was never found. Old wounds rise to the surface as they clear the original suspect from the case, but also learn that Nancy had kept journals and talked to a fortune teller in hopes of her brother's spirit guiding her to his remains. Returning to the graveyard, Rex finds Michael's skeletal remains. After the fortune teller is attacked, Rex identifies a car sound in Holden's recording, determining that the Rubics' neighbour Ben killed Michael. After a confrontation, Rex helps disarm Ben. Donovan asks Hudson and Rex to help determine if his daughter is taking drugs, but they and Sarah later learn she's in a relationship with another girl and hasn't told her father yet.
4	4	"School Daze"	Alison Reid	Ken Cuperus & Céleste Parr	April 15, 2019	104	320,000
Controversial Professor Sharpe is found dead in his lecture hall at Heritage University. Hudson and Rex's investigation leads them to multiple suspects, who were involved with Sharpe. His TA Toby Whalen is cleared, while Alicia Gillis is determined to have seduced Sharpe and brought him to her home hours before his death. Furthermore, campus security officer Lane Wheatly is revealed to have handled the drugs used in Sharpe's death. The investigation later determines that Sharpe was killed in the same way student Megan Bailey committed suicide earlier. Jesse goes undercover to help with insight to the drug trade and other potential suspects. When his story contradicts itself, RA Kevin Conway drugs him and attempts to drown him in the pool. Hudson and Rex manage to save him. Kevin is determined as the mastermind of Sharpe's death. Jesse is celebrated for his first undercover assignment when he wakes up and returns to duty.
5	5	"The Pet Sitter"	Alison Reid	John Callaghan	April 22, 2019	105	404,000
Charlie and Rex investigate the death of a pet sitter.
6	6	"Murder, She Thought"	Alison Reid	Ken Cuperus & Laura Harbin	April 29, 2019	106	N/A
Hudson and Rex investigate a string of recent deaths at a retirement home, where Hudson's spunky, mystery-loving aunt lives.
7	7	"Trial and Error"	John Vatcher	John Callaghan	June 13, 2019	107	N/A
Sarah finds herself in the middle of a hostage situation at a medical testing lab that stores lethal viruses. When the team realizes there is no way inside without aggravating the gunman, Charlie sends Rex in to monitor the situation.
8	8	"Fast Eddie's, Slow Food"	John Vatcher	Avrum Jacobson	June 20, 2019	108	N/A
After a reviled restaurateur's food truck explodes, killing one of his employees, Charlie and Rex find themselves with a few too many suspects. A flirtation has Charlie torn between a possible new love and Rex's reaction.
9	9	"The Mourning Show"	Felipe Rodriquez	Mary Pedersen	June 27, 2019	109	N/A
Charlie investigates the host of a local morning show after her media mogul husband is suddenly found dead.
10	10	"Art of Darkness"	John Vatcher	Jessie Gabe	July 4, 2019	110	N/A
Sarah, Charlie and Rex are introduced to the world of high art after the murder of an art gallery curator during a robbery at the gallery.
11	11	"Bad Water Rising"	John Vatcher	Jessie Gabe	July 11, 2019	111	N/A
When an activist is killed during a break-and-enter at a water bottling plant, all evidence points towards his partner-in-crime/girlfriend, but Charlie and Rex are not convinced. Joining forces with the sister of the victim, a Native police officer, Charlie and Rex must protect the victim’s girlfriend from the murderer, who is looking for something the victim hid before he was murdered.
12	12	"A Cult Education"	Sherren Lee	Derek Schreyer	July 18, 2019	112	580,000
When Superintendent Donovan's ex-wife, a recovering addict, wakes up with blood on her hands and a dead roommate in her apartment, the team moves quickly, finding there is more to the story than meets the eye.
13	13	"The Rex Files"	Sherren Lee	Jessie Gabe	July 25, 2019	113	626,000
When a deadly car accident leads Charlie and Rex to investigate reports of a mysterious blue light in the sky, they discover the truth is more science than fiction. Things get really strange when paranormal podcaster/enthusiast Tyler (from Haunted by the Past) disappears while looking for the source of the blue light, which he believes to be aliens.

=== Season 2 (2019–2020) ===
No. overall	No. in season	Title	Directed by	Written by	Original release date	Prod. code	Canada viewers
14	1	"A Man of Consequence"	Felipe Rodriquez	Ken Cuperus and Avrum Jacobson	September 24, 2019	114	247,000
Charlie and Rex discover a wanted criminal (David Hewlett) has been living under a fake identity in St. John's for the past 20 years and end up in the crosshairs when the man's past catches up with him, in the form of a vindictive woman hellbent on avenging her father's alleged murder twenty years ago.
15	2	"Over Ice"	Felipe Rodriquez	Céleste Parr	October 1, 2019	115	235,000
Charlie and Rex investigate the death of a figure skater's coach who is found dead on her club's ice rink.
16	3	"Blind Justice"	Felipe Rodriquez	Derek Schreyer	October 8, 2019	116	N/A
A murder at the St. John's docks opens an investigation into a high stakes smuggling operation, where Charlie and Rex must team up with an old antagonist of Charlie's.
17	4	"Strangers in the Night"	T.J. Scott	Story by : Carol Hay & Duncan Hay Jennings; Teleplay by : Carol Hay	October 15, 2019	201	N/A
Charlie and Rex pull apart the secrets of a local band when their lead singer is found dead on the beach.
18	5	"Dead Man Walking"	Felipe Rodriguez	Ken Cuperus	October 22, 2019	202	N/A
The clock is ticking as Charlie and Rex attempt to find a murderer before the victim, a private investigator, can succumb to the poison slowly killing him. Charlie and Rex meet a list of potential suspects, a Congresswoman who has been sent death threats since filing for divorce, her assistant, her rejected, troubled husband, a horror novelist and his coordinator.
19	6	"Under the Influencer"	Eleanore Lindo	Jessie Gabe	October 29, 2019	203	N/A
Charlie and Rex are on the case after a social media star dies while livestreaming her wedding.
20	7	"The Woods Have Eyes"	T.J. Scott	Julian Doucet	November 5, 2019	205	N/A
As Charlie and Rex head into the woods to track a missing photographer/nature activist, a mysterious organization throws the investigation off its trail. As they track down the photographer, Charlie, Rex and their allies, the SJPD and a Wilderness officer realize that there is a traitor in their midst.
21	8	"Game of Bones"	Eleanore Lindo	Stephanie Tracey	November 12, 2019	206	N/A
Charlie and Rex investigate a fantasy role-playing game turned deadly when a player is found slain by a sword. They discover that the victim, an avid researcher of Viking history and legends, was on the search for a legendary sword once believed to be non-existent.
22	9	"Bullet in the Water"	Mars Horodyski	Derek Schreyer	November 19, 2019	208	N/A
Charlie and Rex are in deep water after a university rower is shot by a sniper during team practice.
23	10	"The French Connection"	John Vatcher	Derek Schreyer and Alex Pugsley	November 26, 2019	204	N/A
Cultures clash when the death of a Parisian journalist has Charlie and Rex partnering with a French detective (who was a family friend of the victim), in an investigation that whisks the team to Saint Pierre and Miquelon. They discover that the victim was investigating the sudden reemergence of a unique and rare variety of vintage wine.
24	11	"Rex Machina"	Felipe Rodriguez	Vivian Lin	January 14, 2020	209	N/A
An automotive engineer is found dead in the self-driving SUV she has been designing and building.
25	12	"Rex and the City"	John Vatcher	Jackie May	January 21, 2020	207	N/A
When a prominent member of an exclusive dating app is found with an arrow through his heart, Charlie must go undercover in the online dating scene.
26	13	"In Pod We Trust"	Stephanie Morgenstern	Pierre Mur and Stephanie Tracey	January 28, 2020	211	N/A
When the circumstances of a murder appear to mimic a contentious crime from twenty years earlier, Charlie and Rex must connect the past to the present while fending off a true crime podcaster. Meanwhile, Superintendent Donovan has to confront his activist daughter and the public's accusations for letting a man be arrested solely based on him being black. Donovan, who is black himself, reveals himself to a mysterious informant who was trying to uncover exonerating information of the suspect of the twenty-year-old crime. Charlie, Donovan and Rex discover that the chilling answers to the two crimes lies in the victim's family – a dead brother and an outraged, disgraced police officer and a snitch in the SJPD.
27	14	"Tunnel Vision"	Felipe Rodriquez	Ken Cuperus	February 4, 2020	210	N/A
Charlie and Rex head underground into an allegedly haunted mine after a crew member turns up dead during a horror film shoot based on a local legend of the ghost of a miner believed to have murdered his fellow miners in a fit of madness. The dynamic duo uncover implications the director's wife was having an affair with the victim before he was murdered. They also encounter a disgruntled mine historian who passionately disapproves of the local legend of "Cold-Hearted Caleb". Things turn deadly when Charlie and Sarah are trapped under a cave-in and it is up to Rex to save the day.
28	15	"Finger Foodie"	Adriana Maggs	Jessie Gabe	February 11, 2020	212	N/A
Charlie and Rex investigate the long list of enemies surrounding a vitriolic celebrity chef after a finger turns up in his Beef Wellington. They discover that one of the inspiring chefs that the celebrity chef dismissed killed himself from a drug overdose and that his lover from his past is out for revenge.
29	16	"Flare of the Dog"	Felipe Rodriquez	Derek Schreyer & Vivian Lin	February 18, 2020	213	N/A
Charlie is unable to let a serial arsonist case rest even when he is in the hospital with a broken leg; working from his bed Charlie hopes to identify the arsonist before he strikes again.
30	17	"The Graveyard Shift"	John Vatcher	Ken Cuperus and Joseph Milando	March 3, 2020	215	N/A
Charlie and Rex find themselves at the mercy of a dangerous crime kingpin from their past when they try to enlist his help on a case.
31	18	"Old Dog, New Tricks"	Felipe Rodriquez	Julian Doucet	March 17, 2020	214	N/A
When Sarah's former professor is framed for the murder of his wife, Sarah calls Charlie and Rex to untangle the perfect crime.
32	19	"In a Family Way"	Harvey Crossland	Derek Schreyer	March 24, 2020	216	N/A
After a woman is found dead in the snow, Charlie and Rex have a pool of suspects with only one thing in common; the victim was convinced they were all her family.

=== Season 3 (2021) ===
No. overall	No. in season	Title	Directed by	Written by	Original release date	Prod. code	Canada viewers
33	1	"Origin Story"	John Vatcher	Jackie May	January 5, 2021	301	N/A
On the third anniversary of Charlie and Rex's partnership, Charlie recounts how a high stakes kidnapping brought the duo together on their first case. Rex was partnered with K9 handler Officer Grace Lindsey, who was shot and killed by the kidnapper of a young boy. Charlie manages to calm the distraught Rex down and discovers the police dog's high intelligence and superior scent detection while fending off Sergeant Jan Renley, the strict K9 superior who wants to "retire" Rex. Charlie and Rex discover the boy's mother stole her son to escape her abusive husband. The husband tracked them down and sent the kidnapper to retrieve his son. Charlie manages to locate the kidnapper/Officer Lindsey’s murderer and the boy and Rex saves Charlie from being shot by performing his signature jump, knocking the murderer down. Donovan and Renley allow Charlie to keep Rex as his partner. The episode ends with Hudson, Sarah, Rex, Donovan, Renley, and the boy and his mother visiting Lindsey’s grave.
34	2	"Manhunt"	Eleanore Lindo	Carol Hay and John Callaghan	January 12, 2021	305	N/A
On the hunt for an escaped murderer, Charlie and Rex are held hostage. But when a greater threat emerges, Charlie and his captor are forced to work together if they are going to make it out alive.
35	3	"Into the Wild"	Ruba Nadda	Ken Cuperus	January 19, 2021	306	N/A
After a mummified body is discovered in Newfoundland's tundra, Charlie and Rex set off in search of a community of survivalists who may be harbouring a murderer.
36	4	"Under Pressure"	John Vatcher	Derek Schreyer	January 26, 2021	307	N/A
A scuba diver washes ashore with his oxygen supply severed; Charlie dives into the Atlantic Ocean to uncover the secret he was killed to protect.
37	5	"Prescription-Rex!"	Harvey Crossland	Cal Coons	February 2, 2021	302	N/A
The near poisoning of a wealthy socialite throws the team into a perilous investigation that puts Charlie, Rex, and even Jesse in harm's way. Jesse reconnects with an old friend who is dedicated to providing medical help for the impoverished and discovers that she might be involved with the socialite's poisoning. The socialite's assistant is found murdered in her apartment and Rex almost loses his life after finding heroin in the second victim's apartment, leaving Charlie shaken.
38	6	"Endless Summer"	Eleanore Lindo	Simon McNabb	February 9, 2021	303	N/A
A young woman is abducted from the very spot her friend was murdered two years earlier; Charlie and Rex race against time as they trail the suspects from the original investigation.
39	7	"All in the Litter"	Filipe Rodriguez	Cal Coons	February 16, 2021	310	N/A
Rex is on trial after his DNA is discovered at the scene of the murder of Donovan's former police informant. With his dying breath, Donovan's informant tells him to locate "Tross". Rex is cleared of charges when it is discovered that his litter mate, Bucky (who works as a therapy dog) was with the victim during his counseling session with his therapist (and Bucky's owner). In a subplot, Rex donates blood to his other brother Otto, who was sick and needs a blood transfusion. In the end, Rex, Bucky and Otto pose for a family reunion picture.
40	8	"Sleeping Beauty"	Bosede Williams	Sonja Bennett	February 23, 2021	308	N/A
Charlie and Rex investigate a fairytale-turned-nightmare when a princess performer suspiciously dies at a child's birthday party.
41	9	"Grave Matters"	Eleanore Lindo	Derek Schreyer	March 2, 2021	312	N/A
Charlie and Rex are in grave danger as they find themselves captives of a kidnapper seeking vengeance.
42	10	"Fanning the Flames"	Cal Coons	Jackie May	March 9, 2021	304	N/A
An arsonist begins terrorizing a neighbourhood with car bombs. Charlie and Rex race to find the next target before the case goes up in smoke.
43	11	"Blood on the Tracks"	Tracey Deer	Joseph Milando	March 16, 2021	313	N/A
When a murder appears to mimic an infamous crime spree from the past, Charlie and Rex rush to stop the culprit from continuing a serial killer's legacy.
44	12	"Top Dog"	Adriana Maggs	Lori Spring	March 23, 2021	309	N/A
Charlie lets Rex take the lead as they investigate a murder at a prestigious dog show.
45	13	"Mansion on a Hill"	John Vatcher	John Callaghan	March 30, 2021	315	822,000
Trapped in an isolated mansion during a storm, Charlie and Rex uncover a wannabe killer after the hostess is drugged; Sarah fights to keep her alive.
46	14	"The Secret Life of Levi"	Mars Horodyski	Vivian Lin & Sonja Bennett	April 6, 2021	314	N/A
Jesse's friend vanishes; Charlie and Rex discover the man was living two separate lives.
47	15	"Seeing Is Deceiving"	Harvey Crossland	Derek Schreyer	April 13, 2021	316	N/A
A magician dies during a practice run of her latest routine; Charlie and Rex must look beyond the smoke and mirrors to uncover the truth.
48	16	"The Art of the Steal"	Eleanore Lindo	Vivian Lin	April 20, 2021	311	N/A
Charlie and Rex witness an armed robbery during a trip to the bank; they discover a connection to a string of ingenious unsolved heists.

=== Season 4 (2021–2022) ===
No. overall	No. in season	Title	Directed by	Written by	Original release date	Canadian viewers
49	1	"Sid and Nancy"	Gary Harvey	Peter Mitchell	October 7, 2021	N/A
When two hikers are discovered murdered near a remote coastal trail, the team is on the hunt for a fugitive duo wanted in a series of grisly campsite murders.
50	2	"Rex Marks the Spot"	Gary Harvey	Joseph Milando	October 14, 2021	N/A
After a journalist is killed searching for buried pirate treasure, Charlie and Rex dig deep into the competitive world of treasure hunters to unearth the killer.
51	3	"Oops I Bit It Again"	Eleanore Lindo	Mary Pedersen	October 21, 2021	N/A
The team uncovers the distorted loyalties that form when personal ties meet the trappings of fame when a troubled young pop star is suspected of killing her fiancé.
52	4	"Leader of the Pack"	Eleanore Lindo	Keri Ferencz	October 28, 2021	903,000
While Sarah embarks on a wilderness adventure, Charlie and Rex investigate the murder of a college professor.
53	5	"Rex to Riches"	Gary Harvey	Keri Ferencz	November 4, 2021	N/A
A stock market guru's fortune is stolen, setting Charlie and Rex on the trail of a very surprising thief.
54	6	"Dead Man's Bridge"	Gary Harvey	Ken Cuperus	November 11, 2021	N/A
After a truck transporting liquid explosive is hijacked by criminals, Charlie and Rex find themselves in a race against time to prevent the case from blowing sky high.
55	7	"A Stab in the Dark Web"	Bosede Williams	Jennifer Kassabian	November 18, 2021	974,000
As Major Crimes investigates a dark web marketplace, Charlie and Rex protect a witness in their home.
56	8	"Sudden Death"	Bosede Williams	Derek Schreyer	November 25, 2021	882,000
After an elite hockey prospect is found dead, Charlie and Jesse disagree over the prime suspect in the case.
57	9	"Impawster Syndrome"	Sharon Lewis	Keri Ferencz & Joseph Milando	January 6, 2022	N/A
The Major Crimes team is forced to turn against Jesse when he becomes the prime suspect in a bank robbery.
58	10	"Blood & Diamonds"	Sharon Lewis	Mary Pedersen	January 13, 2022	1,000,000
After a raw diamond is found at the crime scene of a murder, Major Crimes sets up a stakeout to take down the suspected gem smugglers. An undisclosed team connection threatens to derail the investigation.
59	11	"Capital Punishment"	Felipe Rodriguez	Derek Schreyer	January 20, 2022	915,000
Charlie and Rex receive an award for heroism while Major Crimes investigates an extremist threat.
60	12	"No Man Is an Island"	Felipe Rodriguez	M.T. Diallo	March 22, 2022	N/A
Charlie, Rex and Sarah travel to an isolated island community caught up in a resettlement dispute. Donovan tries to stop a British police officer from derailing the investigation.
61	13	"Roses of Signal Hill"	Deanne Foley	Jennifer Kassabian	March 29, 2022	N/A
Rex's starring role in a television commercial is interrupted by the murder of one of the agency's ad executives.
62	14	"Roll the Bones"	Felipe Rodriguez	Vivian Lin	April 5, 2022	N/A
After the owner of a construction company is found dead, Charlie and Rex track the killer to an underground casino. Major Crimes goes undercover to solve the case.
63	15	"Nightmare on Water St."	John Vatcher	Joseph Milando	April 12, 2022	N/A
While St. John's celebrates Mardi Gras, Charlie and Rex investigate a targeted killing spree.
64	16	"Dog Days are Over"	Felipe Rodriguez	Mary Pedersen	April 19, 2022	N/A
When officer Maya Power and her K9 partner, a Rottweiler named Rebel, are violently attacked responding to a call about a warehouse break-in, Major Crimes is at the ready.

=== Season 5 (2022–2023) ===
No. overall	No. in season	Title	Directed by	Written by	Original release date
65	1	"Lost in the Barrens"	Peter Mitchell	Peter Mitchell	September 25, 2022
When a young woman goes missing in the Barrens, suspicion turns to the woman's boyfriend; it is up to the team to uncover the truth behind her disappearance.
66	2	"Punch Drunk Glove"	John Vatcher	M.T. Diallo	October 2, 2022
When Charlie's estranged brother is accused of the death of his recent boxing opponent, Charlie and the team wrestle with the possibility of his guilt.
67	3	"Run, Donovan, Run"	Peter Mitchell	Ken Cuperus	October 9, 2022
When Superintendent Donovan transports an inmate, who happens to be his former partner, he finds himself confronting the past and caught up in a daring and dangerous escape.
68	4	"Hand of Cod"	John Vatcher	Robina Lord-Stafford	October 16, 2022
When a young female entrepreneur's hand is found in one of the crates of her salt fish company, Charlie and Rex discover that she has been sent racial threats and suspect a business rival might have something to do with the victim's death. Meanwhile, Jesse interacts with Karma, SJPD's new medical examiner, and helps her find several missing possessions, including the victim's heirloom ring.
69	5	"The Good Shepherd"	Mary Pedersen	Céleste Parr	October 23, 2022
When Rex is accused of attacking a decorated former police officer, Charlie enlists the help of an unorthodox ally to uncover the truth in the hopes of restoring Rex's position on the team.
70	6	"Den of Snakes"	Eleanore Lindo	Keri Ferencz	October 30, 2022
The owner/creator of "Cottage Games", a popular game company which includes the equally popular "Snake Pit" board game, is found dead, killed by nine snake bites. Charlie and Rex discover a mass of suspects and conflicting motives. Sarah must confront her Ophidiophobia as she discovers that the snake used to kill the victim was a black mamba and teams up with an eccentric snake wrangler to find the venomous snake before more people fall victim. Meanwhile, Jesse persuades Superintendent Donovan to pursue online dating by secretly setting up a Tinder dating profile.
71	7	"The Date Escape"	Eleanore Lindo	Christina Ray	November 6, 2022
After two killers escape from St. John's Women's Penitentiary, the team is stymied in their attempts to capture the duo when their antics turn them into modern-day folk heroes.
72	8	"Bury the Lead"	JJ Neepin	Joseph Milando	November 13, 2022
A student is found murdered by Donovan's daughter Camilla at a college rave. Charlie, Sarah and Jesse work to find the killer while stumbling on Camilla's meddling to get the story for her journalism internship.
73	9	"Rexpert Witness"	Harvey Crossland	Joseph Milando	November 20, 2022
When Sarah's expert testimony in an arson court case is unraveled by a former colleague, the team has only 48 hours to discover the truth before the suspect is released. Sarah returns to the lab to get to the truth, and Rex assists in uncovering manipulated evidence to solve the arson and a murder.
74	10	"One Wild Night"	Harvey Crossland	Keri Ferencz	November 27, 2022
When the maid-of-honor winds up dead after a bachelorette party, it is up to Charlie and Rex to untangle the events of the night. They both discover a dark secret underneath the noise of drug addiction and friendship troubles.
75	11	"Working for the Weekend"	Deanne Foley	Molly Clayton	January 17, 2023
When Rex finds a body with signs of foul play, Charlie discovers the idyllic community he is staying in may be more hostile than it looks.
76	12	"Lost Lives Club"	Deanne Foley	Christina Ray	January 24, 2023
After a popular physiotherapist is murdered, the team must investigate the victims of his alleged sexual assaults in order to track down the killer before they strike again.
77	13	"The Miranda Act"	Eleanore Lindo	Ken Cuperus	January 31, 2023
Charlie's beloved Aunt Miranda and her friends are caught investigating an investment fraud scheme, it is up to Charlie and Rex to get to the source of the fraud.
78	14	"Rexit, Stage Left"	Eleanore Lindo	Andrea Dunne & Keri Ferencz	March 7, 2023
When a famous starlet is killed onstage during a preview performance of a beloved Newfoundland play, Rex takes on a starring role while Charlie goes behind the scenes.
79	15	"Northern Rexposure"	TJ Scott	Mary Pedersen	March 21, 2023
When Jesse's sister contacts him for help, he, Sarah and Rex head to Northern Ontario and find themselves in the middle of a deadly situation.
80	16	"Due North"	TJ Scott	Mary Pedersen & Joseph Milando	March 28, 2023
Rex seeks help from Detective Sidney Scott in order to save his stranded and injured friends.
81	17	"Lost and Found"	Warren Sonoda	Keri Ferencz & Joseph Milando	April 4, 2023
Charlie gets a break in a long-unsolved kidnapping case that has haunted him, but runs into trouble when the abductee refuses his help, believing that her kidnappers are her real parents.
82	18	"Jail Break"	Warren Sonoda	Peter Mitchell	April 11, 2023
A convicted murderer and his two accomplices break out of the SJPD jail with hostages. As tensions escalate, SWAT are threatening to go on hard and Charlie becomes a hostage.
83	19	"The Cook, the Chief, the Cop and His Lover"	Felipe Rodriguez	Elyne Quan	April 18, 2023
The police super dies whilst eating at Sarah's favorite restaurant. Investigating the murder, and the feud between rival restaurant owners, threatens to expose Sarah and Charlie's relationship.
84	20	"One for the Road"	Felipe Rodriguez; Elsbeth McCall	Mary Pedersen	April 25, 2023
Charlie and Rex try to take down a car theft ring after one of the team is seriously injured trying to stop a theft in progress.

=== Season 6 (2023–2024) ===
No. overall	No. in season	Title	Directed by	Written by	Original release date
85	1	"Ghost Ship"	John Vatcher	Adam Barken	October 4, 2023
When a local whale watching boat mysteriously returns to harbor without its passengers, Charlie and Rex must race against time to find the missing tourists.
86	2	"The Good, The Bad, and the Rex"	TJ Scott	Jennifer Kassabian	October 11, 2023
A series of robberies have been committed. With the help of a Navy veteran family friend, Charlie and Rex discover that there is a heartfelt, tragic side to the murders when the two robbers are revealed to be brother and sister, and that their father, a war hero, is dying of cancer. It is revealed that Charlie has an estranged relationship with his father. In the end, Charlie, affected by the case, talks to his father on the phone.
87	3	"Hound & Vision"	John Vatcher	Joseph Milando	October 18, 2023
Charlie and Rex piece together the mysterious disappearance of a prominent judge with the help from the victim's next door neighbor, a blind true crime podcaster named Brooke Weaver, who overheard a confrontation between the judge and her assailant. Brooke is convinced that the judge was murdered, based on what she overheard. Things take a turn for the worse when the judge is found dead in a body bag and the evidence points towards a few potential suspects; the boyfriend of the judge's estranged daughter and a juvenile delinquent whose parole has been denied by the judge.
88	4	"Hour of the Dog"	TJ Scott	Mary Pedersen	October 25, 2023
In a case that unfolds in real-time, Charlie and Rex have one hour to disarm a masked gunman holding the employees of an insurance office hostage.
89	5	"Hero by Night"	Eleanore Lindo	Ken Cuperus	November 1, 2023
A murder in a local park points to someone dressed as The Night Keeper.
90	6	"Claws Out"	Eleanore Lindo	John Callaghan	November 8, 2023
An eccentric millionaire is found dead, surrounded by his three beloved German Shepherds. His three estranged friends, brought together by the event of his death and subsequent will, are forced to take care of his dogs. Meanwhile, Jesse worries about getting his SJPD badge.
91	7	"Dancer, Traitor, Shepherd, Spy"	Jennifer Liao	Jennifer Kassabian	February 20, 2024
An instructor at a prestigious ballet school dies mysteriously, and Charlie and Rex discover he has ties to Russian spies.
92	8	"Doghouse"	Harvey Crossland	Taf Diallo	February 27, 2024
Charlie and Rex go undercover in prison to investigate the murder of David Aziz.
93	9	"Hudson and Son"	Elsbeth McCall	Céleste Parr	March 5, 2024
When a police officer is killed in the nightlife district, the case narrows on a group of Navy officers.
94	10	"Who's Your Caddy?"	Harvey Crossland	Jennifer Kassabian	March 12, 2024
Jennica Malouf, a wealthy socialite, turns up dead on a golf course.
95	11	"Dog and Pony Show"	Deanne Foley	Rose Napoli & Mary Pedersen	March 26, 2024
Charlie fears the worst after Rex goes missing while investigating the theft of a champion horse.
96	12	"Bark and Bite"	Deanne Foley	Keavy Lynch	April 2, 2024
A convicted killer resorts to drastic measures to avoid deportation, leading Charlie and Rex to re-open his case.
97	13	"Dogged Pursuit"	Jerry Ciccoritti	Molly Clayton	April 9, 2024
When Sarah's old friend suffers an attack that leaves him in a coma, she travels to Toronto to confront his wife, while Charlie and Rex find suspects closer to home.
98	14	"Death on the Doorstep"	John Vatcher	Joseph Milando	April 16, 2024
Charlie and Rex's home turns into a crime scene when they find a stranger dying in their kitchen.
99	15	"Wag the Dog"	John Vatcher	Mary Pedersen & Céleste Parr	April 23, 2024
When a so-called time traveler warns Major Crimes about a bomb threat, Charlie and Rex are enlisted to protect a prominent political figure at risk of assassination.
100	16	"Rex, Drugs & Rock n' Roll"	Kevin Hanchard	John Callaghan	April 30, 2024
Jesse discovers the body of his guitar teacher, marking his first solo case. Hudson and Rex investigate the death of a concert promoter and quickly discover a connection and team up with Jesse.

=== Season 7 (2025) ===
No. overall	No. in season	Title	Directed by	Written by	Original release date
101	1	"Double Dog Dare"	Felipe Rodriguez	Mary Pedersen	January 14, 2025
A weight lifter is found murdered, then his girlfriend is abducted. The team is led to another island to investigate a complex murder plot.
102	2	"A Room With A Clue"	Felipe Rodriguez	Joseph Milando	January 21, 2025
Sarah and Charlie move into a new house. While Rex is home alone he witnesses one of their neighbors being murdered, leaving Rex to try to communicate this to Charlie.: This episode marks the final appearance of Diesel vom Burgimwald as Rex before his death in August 2024.
103	3	"Shuck Everlasting"	Harvey Crossland	Jason Whiting	January 28, 2025
Rex and Donovan find a body weighted down in the water. The investigation leads them to an oyster farming operation and smugglers. Charlie leaves St. John's and heads to Mexico in search of his brother, who has disappeared, leaving Rex in the care of Donovan, Sarah, and Jesse.
104	4	"K9: The Rext Generation"	Harvey Crossland	Graeme Stewart	February 4, 2025
Charlie remains in Mexico in search of his brother who is missing. A rookie dog handler finds a body on the beach and discovers she knows him. She works with Donovan's team to find the killer.
105	5	"In From The Cold"	Jerry Ciccoritti	Teleplay by : Jackie May & Céleste Parr; Story by : Céleste Parr	February 11, 2025
A novelist writes a book about a cold case murder that took place in St. Johns sparking new interest in the case.
106	6	"Bee-Deviled"	Kevin Hanchard	Cal Coons	February 18, 2025
The team investigates the murder of a beekeeper.
107	7	"Kiss The Cod And Make Them Die"	Deanne Foley	Joseph Milando	February 25, 2025
At a bar where Jesse is singing and playing guitar, a number of the crowd get poisoned during a cod kissing ritual.: First appearance of Luke Roberts as Detective Mark Hudson
108	8	"Hot Prowl In The City"	Deanne Foley	Jennifer Kassabian	March 11, 2025
A stabbing during a failed burglary leads the victim's personal secret to be revealed, and complicates the investigation. Mark brings sobering news about Charlie's absence and whereabouts.

=== Season 8 (2025–2026) ===
No. overall	No. in season	Title	Directed by	Written by	Original release date
109	1	"Into the Wilds"	Harvey Crossland	Peter Mohan	September 22, 2025
When the sole witness against the son of a powerful mob boss goes missing in the woods, it's up to Mark, Rex and Jesse to track him down. Unfortunately, the mob boss has already hired an assassin to find the witness as well. It becomes a deadly game as Mark, Rex, Jesse and the witness are hunted by the skilled and cunning hired gun.
110	2	"Runaway Witness"	Harvey Crossland	Cal Coons	September 29, 2025
A young lawyer is snatched off the street, but the team can't track her down until they locate the sole witness – a child who disappeared from the scene. Rex connects with the traumatized boy, who communicates primarily through drawing. The team races to uncover who is behind the kidnapping and at the centre of a money laundering scheme before the criminal rids themselves of their depreciating asset.
111	3	"Best Kind"	Eleanore Lindo	Peter Mohan	October 6, 2025
When businessman Jake Kaufman is found dead on his yacht, all suspicion falls onto a deckhand who ran from the scene. As Mark and Rex search for motives and clues, it seems that the businessman's missing watch might be what the killer was after… But with Rex being unable to find traces of the watch on any of the suspects, the hunt for the elusive watch and the killer becomes a race against time to save another life.
112	4	"Of All the Gin Joints"	Kevin Hanchard	Jackie May	October 13, 2025
An announcement on the future of the Devereaux Gin Distillery is cut short when the owner is found drowned in his own spirits. The three heirs to the family business become prime suspects as Rex sniffs out the secret ingredient behind a groundbreaking new gin recipe, while Mark revisits the night of the murder to put the family drama to rest.
113	5	"Fortitude Newfoundland"	Deanne Foley	Christina Ray	November 3, 2025
When a survivalist competition broadcasts a finalist's body live on air, the team must figure out who was serious about burying their competition. Mark and Rex discover that the staged bear attack was actually murder, but the show must go on. Rex's keen hearing reveals a dead giveaway in the botched broadcast, leading the team to stage their own finale to catch the killer – live on TV.
114	6	"Conspiracy Theory"	Deanne Foley	Taf Diallo	November 10, 2025
When a conspiracy theory podcaster is found murdered just before her talk at the TruthCon conference, Mark, Rex and the team find themselves thrown into the extreme world of conspiracy theorists. They find that one of the theorists is Mark's old commanding officer, now afflicted with PTSD. In the end, it's Rex's relationship with the old soldier that might lead them to the real killer.
115	7	"Criminal Rex"	Kevin Hanchard	Peter Mohan	November 17, 2025
Sarah and Rex are kidnapped by an old enemy – criminal mastermind Rupert Mankiewicz. Mankiewicz's mission is to exact revenge by weaponizing Rex. Mark and Jesse launch a desperate investigation to find them before Mankiewicz can fulfill his deadly mission.
116	8	"Bird's Eye View"	Eleanore Lindo	Jackie May	November 24, 2025
Birdwatching tourists are ruffled when they spot the body of a landowner who had hidden the nesting site of the rare Red Crossbills from them. When the team unearths a ruby from a 25-year-old jewelry heist connected to the case, Rex tracks the birdsong to find the treasure at the secret nesting site, before the killer can get there first and destroy the endangered birds standing in his way.
117	9	"All the Wrong Moves"	Deanne Foley	Patrick Tarr	February 3, 2026
When a pro wrestler is murdered days before a charity event, Mark and Rex must unmask the villain to save an animal shelter.
118	10	"Murder Al Fesco"	Kevin Hanchard	Rachel Langer	February 10, 2026
When a master painting instructor is pushed off a cliff, Mark and Rex scope out the art world to get to the bottom of a picture-perfect murder.
119	11	"Trial by Fire"	Ruba Nadda	Alan McCullough	February 17, 2026
When firefighter trainees discover a real cadaver during a controlled fire exercise, Mark and Rex follow one burning clue after another.
120	12	"The Briny Deep"	Ruba Nadda	Renée Hackett & Patrick Tarr	February 17, 2026
After a fisherman's body is reeled in with the morning haul, every suspect seems to have an alibi, but the team senses something fishy about the autopsy.
121	13	"Heist for the Holidays"	Harvey Crossland	Kate Pragnell	February 24, 2026
After a robbery interrupts the team's holiday plans, Mark and Rex must track down the masked members of a Newfoundland "mummering" gang going door-to-door spreading Christmas fear.
122	14	"Heist for the Holidays (Part 2)"	Harvey Crossland	Jackie May	March 3, 2026
With Rex and a puppy lost in the wilderness days before Christmas, Mark races to reunite with his partner.

1.Episode was preempted due to baseball, but was released October 20, 2025 on the subscription-based Citytv+ service and broadcast on November 3, 2025.
2.Episode was preempted again due to World Series baseball, but was again released October 27, 2025 on the subscription-based Citytv+ service and broadcast on November 10, 2025.

=== Season 9 (2026–2027) ===
No. overall	No. in season	Title	Directed by	Written by	Original release date
123	1	"The Man in the Hoodie"	Harvey Crossland	Sherry White	October 5, 2026
124	2	"Three's a Crowd"	Cal Coons	Alan McCullough	October 12, 2026
125	3	"End of the Line"	Harvey Crossland	Patrick Tarr	October 19, 2026
126	4	"Team Spirit"	Cal Coons	Teleplay by : Kerri MacDonald; Story by : Kerri MacDonald & Sherry White	October 26, 2026
127	5	"Cleaning House"	Kevin Hanchard	Jackie May	November 2, 2026
128	6	"Big Cheese"	Kevin Hanchard	Andrea Dunne	November 9, 2026
129	7	"Blowin a Gale"	Deanne Foley	Joseph Milando	November 16, 2026
130	8	"Heebie Jeebies"	TBA	TBA	November 23, 2026

== Reception ==
=== Ratings ===
The first six episodes of season one reached more than 2.5 million viewers in Canada. In the 2019–2020 time period, Hudson & Rex was Citytv's highest-rated original scripted series.

=== Reviews ===
Reviewer Rob Buckley, writing for The Medium Is Not Enough after the first episode in March 2019, criticized the writing and direction and described the show as "for the most part unwatchable, tedious".

In April 2026, Good Housekeeping described it as a "terrific detective drama".

== Broadcast ==
Hudson & Rex premiered March 25, 2019, on Canada's Citytv with season 1 planned for 16 episodes. However, only the first 13 episodes were used for season one. The remaining three episodes were broadcast as part of season two. Seven seasons have been produced and broadcast as of 2025.

International

Besides in Canada, Hudson & Rex has aired in the following countries (listed alphabetically): Armenia, Australia, Brazil, Bulgaria, China (Hong Kong), Czech Republic, Denmark, Egypt, Finland, France, Germany, Greece, Hungary, India, Indonesia, Israel, Italy, Japan, Latvia, Lithuania, Mexico, Netherlands, Norway, Philippines, Poland, Portugal, Romania, Singapore, Slovakia, South Africa, South Korea, Spain, Sweden, Switzerland, Taiwan, Thailand, Turkey, United Arab Emirates (UAE), United Kingdom, (UK), United States (USA and Puerto Rico USA), and Uruguay. It had been shown in over 100 countries and territories by 2020.

Beta Film has the international English distribution rights for Hudson & Rex. Broadcaster RAI will begin showing episodes in Italy on Rai 3.

In Germany with TNT Serie and Latin America with the Belleville Group.

In Armenia, Armenian Public TV has aired the show since September 30, 2022.

It has also been distributed in: France with France Televisions via Mediawan Rights, Lithuania with LRT, in Latvia with LTV, Uruguay with Channel 12, and Greece with ANT1.

In Romania, the series started airing on the channel Diva on September 3, 2019.

In the Netherlands, the show airs on FOX.

NBC Universal secured rights for Eastern Europe and Africa.

As of July 2020, the show is being broadcast in the Czech Republic on Televize Prima.

All six seasons are being broadcast on the Alibi TV channel in the UK which shows fictional and non-fictional crime series.

As of January 2021, the show is being broadcast in Slovakia on Jednotka.

In Switzerland (Private Channel 5+) began broadcasting Hudson & Rex in 2024.

In Denmark, the show airs on TV2 Charlie.

In Portugal, the show airs on AXN.

In the United States, the series airs on broadcast network Ion Plus, and cable network Up. Seasons 1–5 were also shown on Amazon Prime Video. Telemundo shows the series in Spanish in the U.S. territory of Puerto Rico.

The European Comisario Rex / Inspector Rex aired in the United States on the V-me network with Latin American Spanish dubbing.

== Production ==
=== Casting ===
Diesel vom Burgimwald (Rex) is a 15th generation descendant of Santo, the first German Shepherd to star in Kommissar Rex (Inspector Rex), the Austrian-Italian television series in the 1990s on which Hudson & Rex is based. German Shepherd dogs Is-He (Izzy) and Iko, are nephews of Diesel, and are his stand-ins for some of the stunts. Diesel vom Burgimwald had mobility training before being cast as Rex. This was Diesel's first show according to his owner-handler Sherri Davis, and training continued on non-shooting days in preparation for future scripts. While on set, Diesel and his co-star-dogs get full star treatment with their own trailers, chef, and chauffeur. Diesel and his character Rex became an honorary firefighter with the St. John's Regional Fire Department (SJRFD) during the filming of "Fast Eddie's," which became part of the episode "Flare of the Dog".

While news of his death was released in February 2025, Diesel vom Burgimwald (Rex) died from cancer in August 2024, during the filming of Season 7. His nephews, Dillon and Dante and his distant cousin Dreamer, who were already acting as "stand-ins" for Diesel, succeeded him in the role. Izzy and Iko continue to perform stunts on the show. Three of Diesel's real life puppies played Buster, Duff, and Kona in "Claws Out" season six, episode six. There are other episodes with several dogs in the story, but his nephews are stunt doubles and stand-ins in action scenes and at photo shoots. In January 2026, the Toronto Star reported that Diesel and three other dogs were poisoned in October 2022.

Diesel vom Burgimwald was a Canadian Kennel Club grand champion, and a direct descendant of the Trienzbachtal bloodlines of “German Shepherd Dogs” and related to the dog VA5 Elch vom Trienzbachtal who was the great-grandfather of the original “Rex” (Santo) in the European TV series Inspector Rex on which Hudson & Rex is based.

The Canadian production of Hudson & Rex was produced after getting production rights after the end of the European TV series that was broadcast in Europe for nearly thirty years. Several actors and dog actors played the main characters in Austria and Italy. The success of Hudson & Rex in English-speaking countries led to a new production in Europe. Kommissar Rex (Inspector Rex) is expected to return to television in Europe in 2026.

=== Filming ===
Hudson and Rex films at various locations across the City of St. John's, most prominently on the Memorial University of Newfoundland campus. The Bruneau Centre (formerly the Inco Centre) doubles as the headquarters for the fictional St. John's Police Department, while the rest of the campus has been used to portray the equally fictional Heritage University of Newfoundland and Labrador.

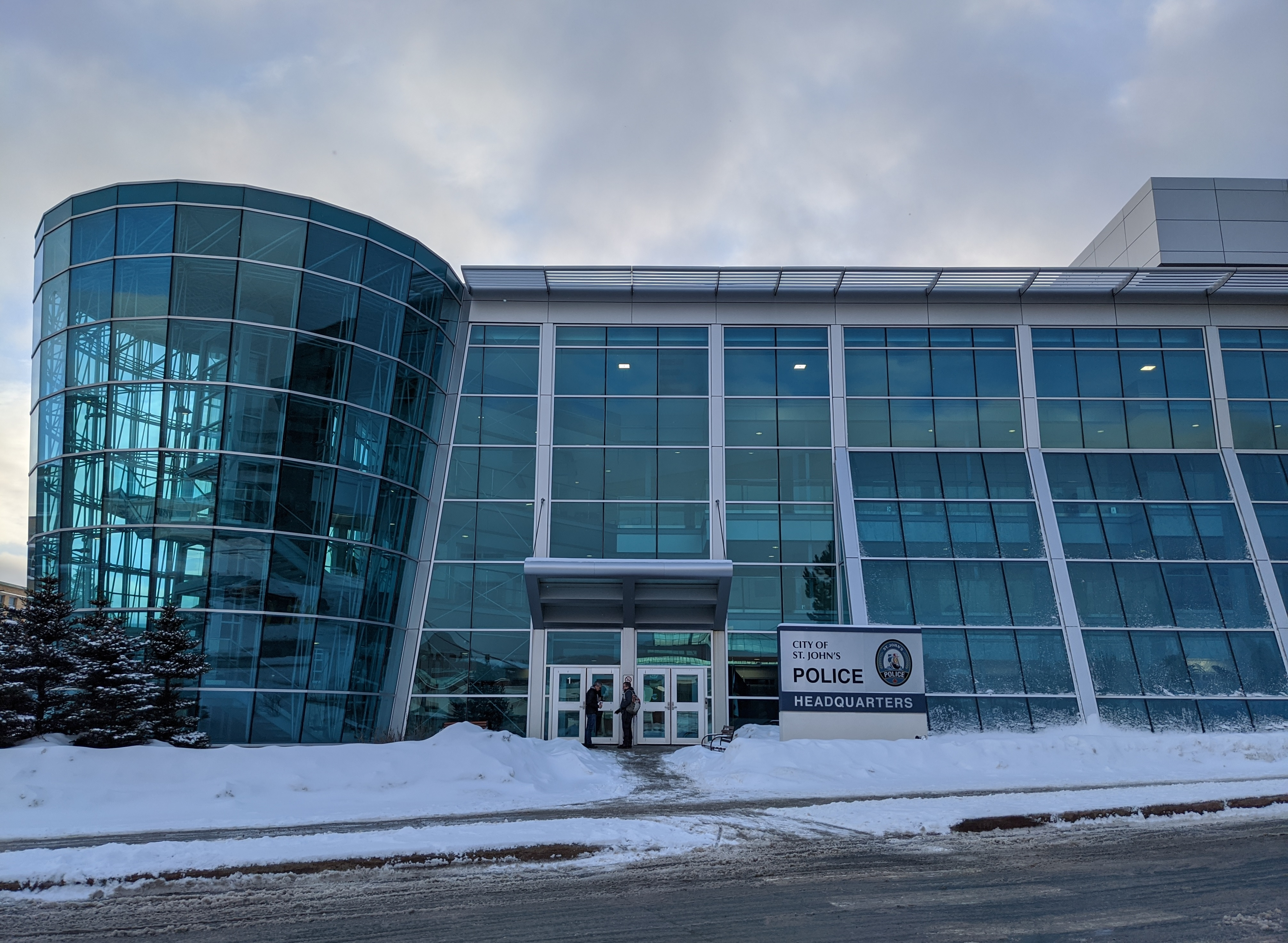
The Bruneau Centre, seen here standing in for the St. John's Police Department.

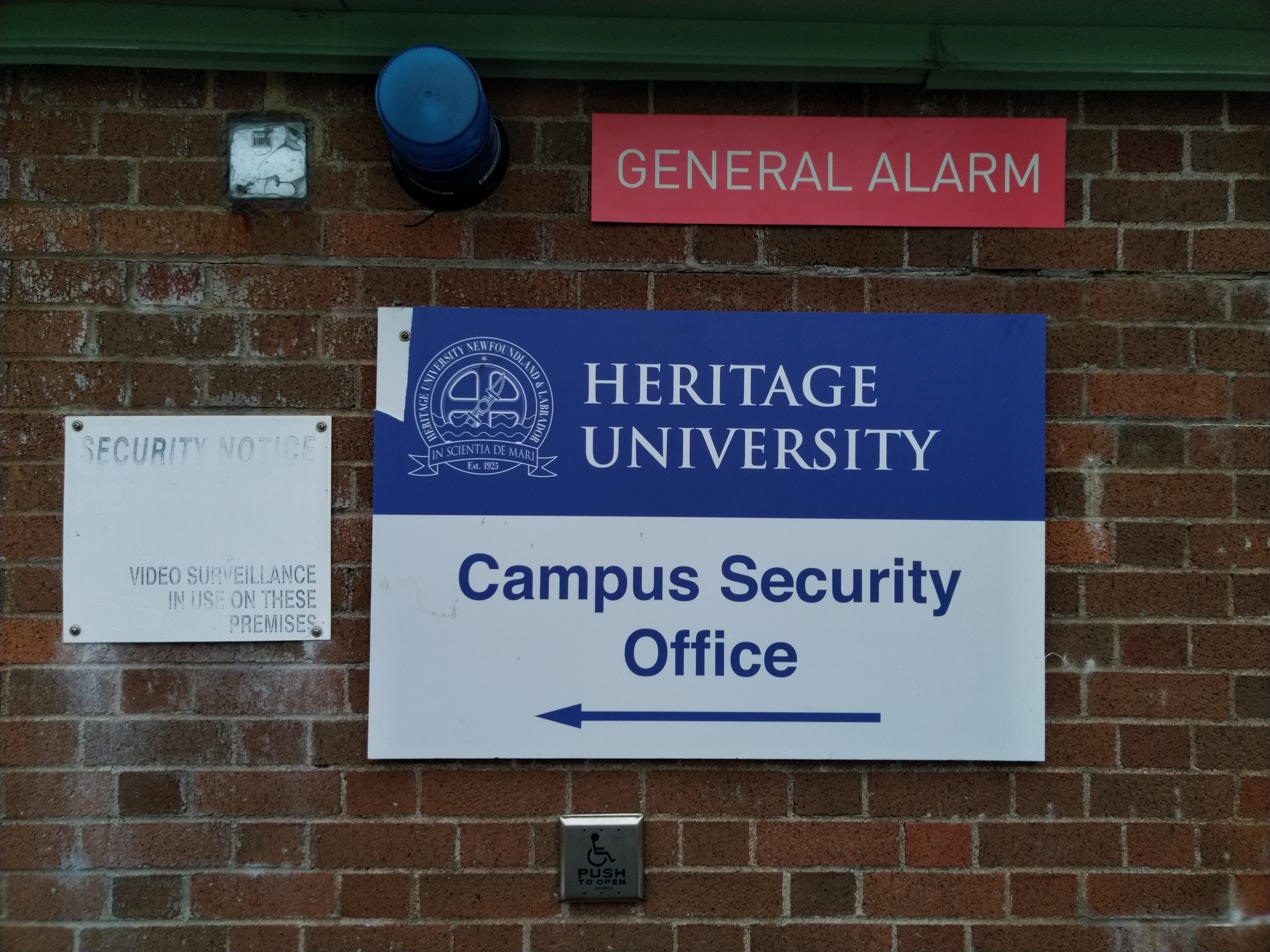
A sign for the fictional Heritage University.

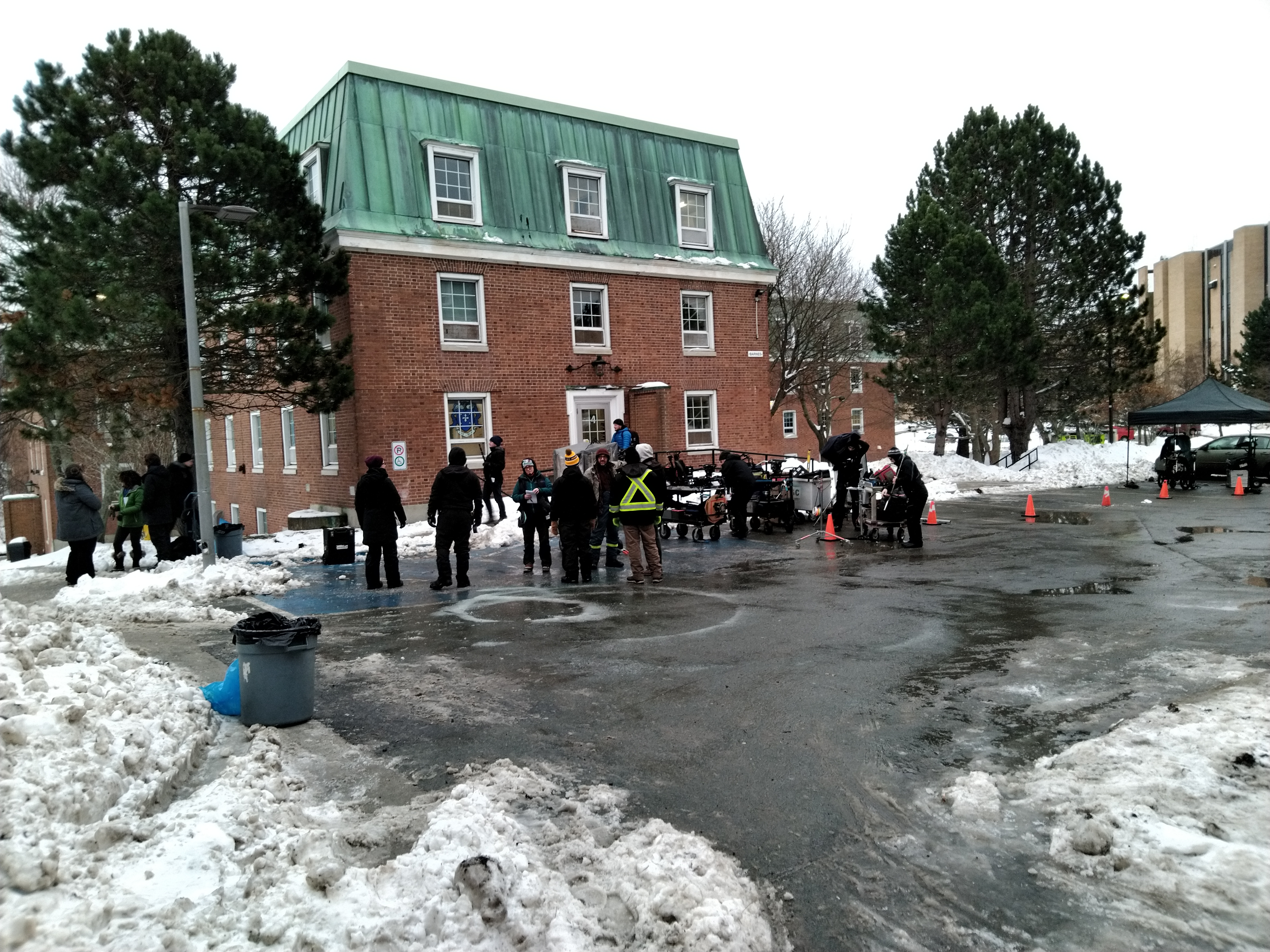
Filming at Paton College

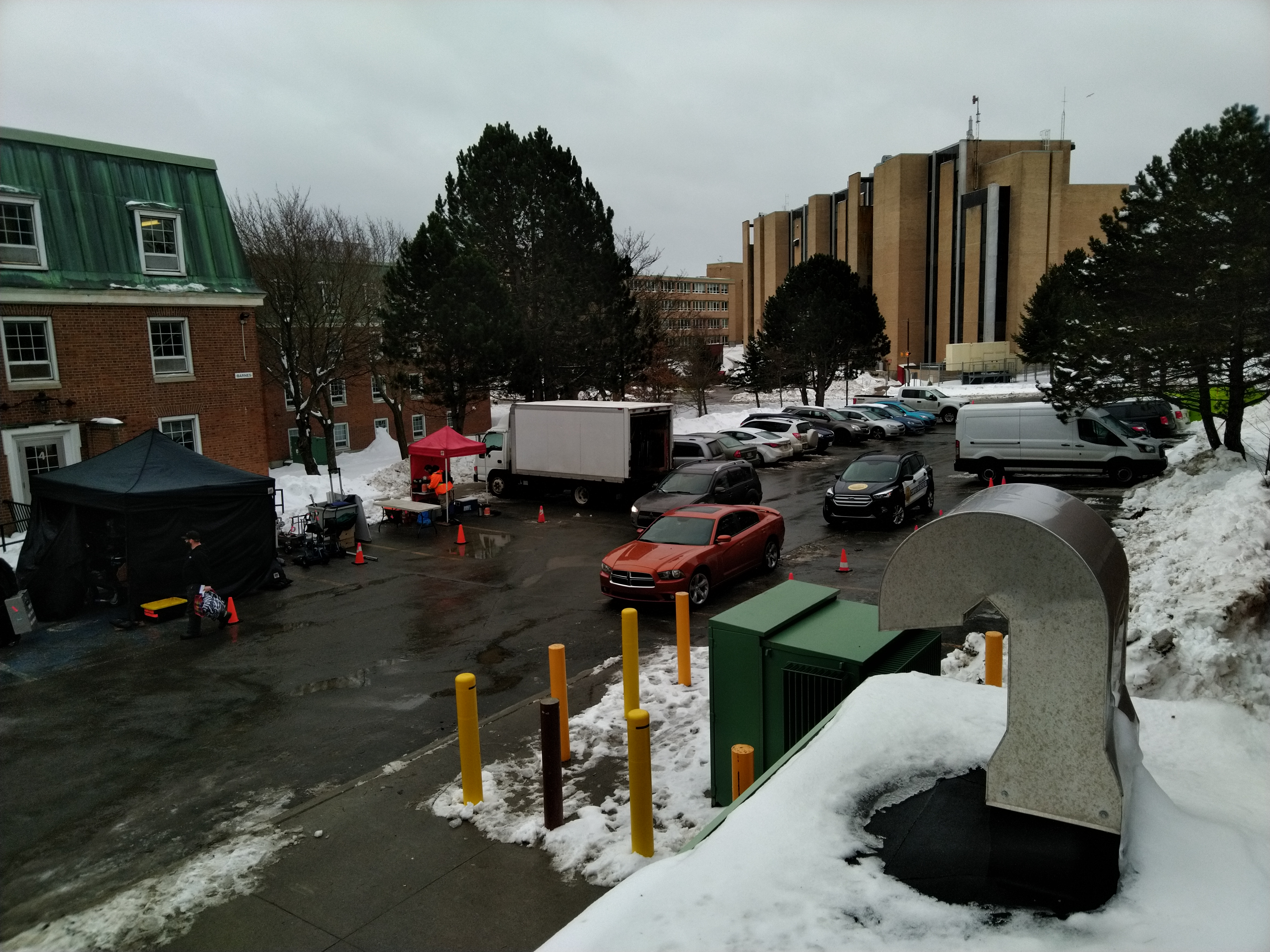
The orange muscle car belongs to protagonist Charlie Hudson, played by John Reardon. Luke Roberts as Mark Hudson now drives a turquoise EV version of the same car.

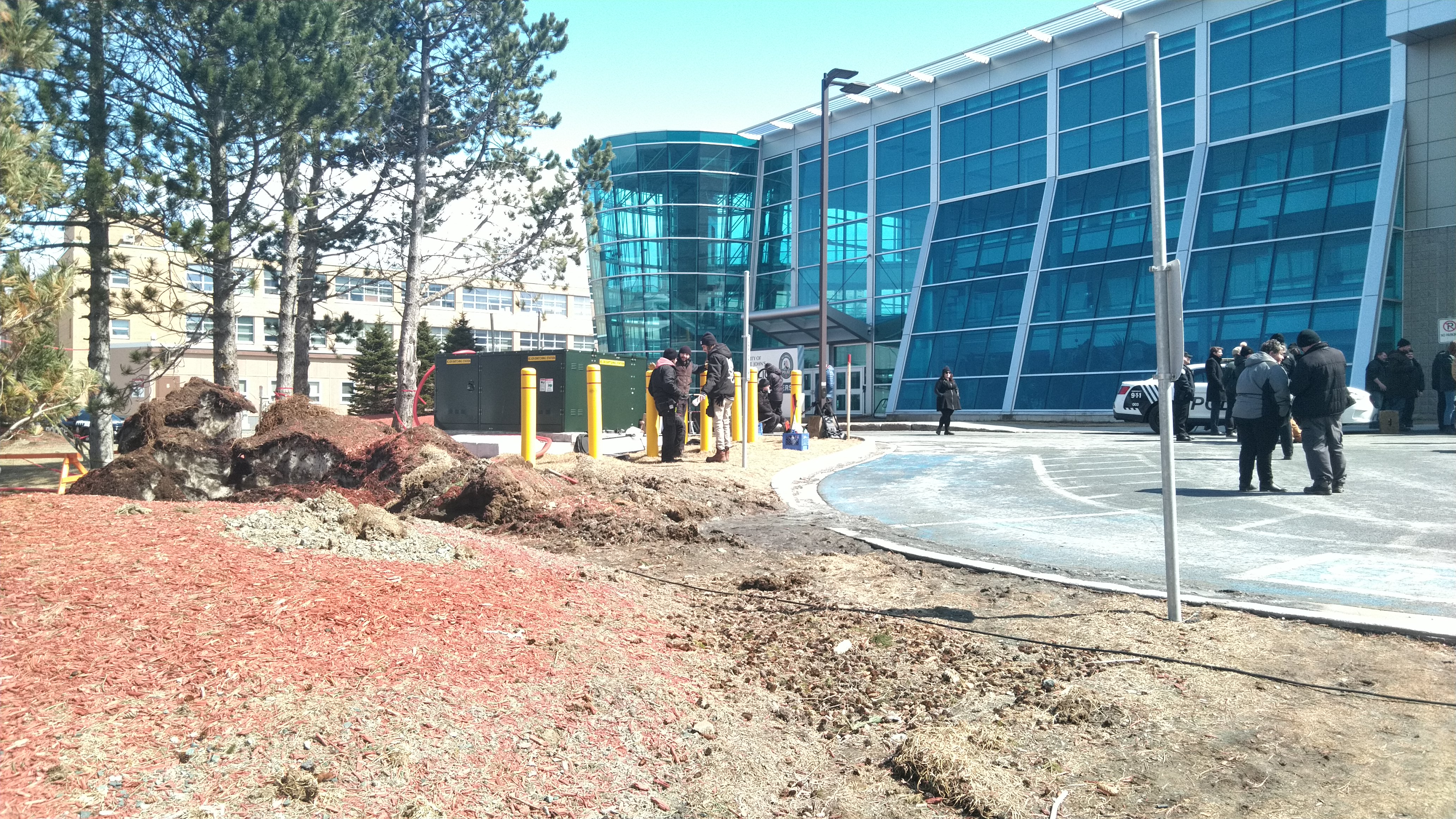
Filming at the Bruneau Centre.
