= List of programs broadcast by Jetix =

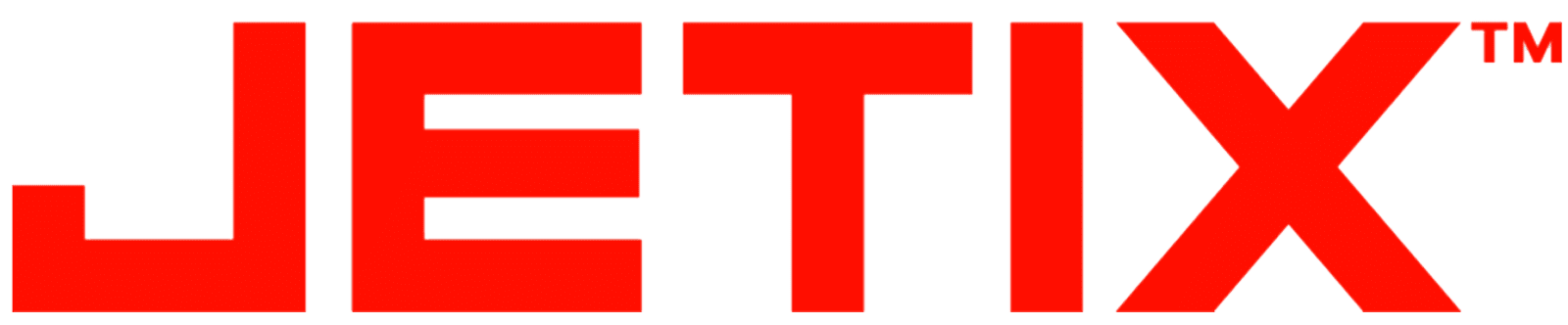

This is a list of television programs that aired on Jetix around the world.

== Jetix Europe co-produced shows ==
Shows co-produced by Jetix Europe N.V.

Note: BVS Entertainment (formerly Saban Entertainment) owned 49.6% of SIP Animation from 1994 until 2012 which laterly fully acquaried all shares in 2012 and went dormant after the full acquisition of Jetix Europe N.V. in 2009. Closed in 2023. Although the studio was a separately operated multi-shareholder unit between 1991 and 2012, BVS International N.V. (formerly Saban International N.V.) owned the rights to "SIP Animation" respective name, brand, logo and trademark between 2002 and 2012.

- The Tofus (2004) (co-produced with SIP Animation and CinéGroupe)
- W.I.T.C.H. (2004) (co-produced with SIP Animation and The Walt Disney Company)
- A.T.O.M. (2005) (co-produced with SIP Animation)
- Monster Warriors (2006) (co-produced with Conybeare Stories, for YTV)
- Galactik Football (2006) (co-produced with Alphanim, Excluding Season 3)
- Shuriken School (2006) (co-produced with Xilam Animation and Zinkia Entertainment)
- Team Galaxy (2006) (co-produced with Marathon Media and Image Entertainment Corporation)
- Ōban Star-Racers (2006) (co-produced with Sav! The World Productions)
- Pucca (2006) (co-produced with Studio B Productions and VOOZ Character System)
- Combo Niños (2008) (co-produced with SIP Animation)
- Monster Buster Club (2007) (co-produced with Marathon Media and Image Entertainment Corporation, for TF1 & YTV)
- Kid vs. Kat (2008) (co-produced with Studio B Productions, Season 1 only for YTV)
- Jimmy Cool (2009) (co-produced with Breakthrough Entertainment and Mercury Filmworks, Season 1 only for Teletoon)
- Khuda-Yana (cancelled) (co-produced with BRB Internacional and Screen 21)

== Jetix original broadcast series ==
The shows that premiered under the Jetix brand with Toon Disney but weren't produced by the network.

Note: The Walt Disney Company owned Saban Entertainment which held the Power Rangers franchise before being sold in 2010 after the closure of Jetix.

- Dragon Booster (premiered 2004, from Canadian Broadcasting Corporation)
- Battle B-Daman (premiered 2005, from TV Tokyo)
- PXG (premiered January 2005)
- Digimon Data Squad (premiered 2007, from Fuji TV)
- Captain Flamingo (premiered January 28, 2008, from YTV & GMA Network)
- Power Rangers Dino Thunder (premiered February 14, 2004)
- Power Rangers S.P.D. (premiered February 5, 2005)
- Power Rangers Mystic Force (premiered February 20, 2006)
- Power Rangers Operation Overdrive (premiered February 26, 2007)
- Power Rangers Jungle Fury (premiered February 18, 2008)
- Robo Crosser (cancelled)

== Jetix Play ==
This is a list of programs that aired on Jetix Play, a sister channel of Jetix that was available in Central Europe, Eastern Europe, and Middle East.

- Bobby's World
- Bad Dog
- Button Nose
- Camp Candy
- Captain Flamingo
- Dennis the Menace
- Diplodos
- Eek! Stravaganza
- Fox's Peter Pan & the Pirates
- Gadget & the Gadgetinis
- The Get Along Gang
- Happy Ness: The Secret of the Loch
- Heathcliff and the Catillac Cats
- Honeybee Hutch
- Huckleberry Finn
- Inspector Gadget
- Jin Jin and the Panda Patrol
- Journey to the Heart of World
- The Kids from Room 402
- Lady Lovely Locks and the Pixietails
- Life with Louie
- The Littl' Bits
- Little Mouse on the Prairie
- Little Wizards
- The Littles
- Pinocchio: The Series
- Princess Sissi
- Princess Tenko and the Guardians of Magic
- Rainbow Brite
- Saban's Around the World in Eighty Dreams
- Saban's Adventures of Oliver Twist
- Saban's Adventures of the Little Mermaid
- Saban's Gulliver's Travels
- The Secret Files of the Spy Dogs
- Three Little Ghosts
- The Tofus
- Walter Melon
- The Why Why Family
- Wunschpunsch

== Americas ==
=== United States ===
For list of Jetix programs airing on Toon Disney and ABC Family, see List of programs broadcast by Jetix (block).

==== Marathons ====
- Power Rangers Generations (premiered 2005) – selections from previous Power Rangers shows.

==== Jetix Animation Concepts ====
Jetix Animation Concepts was a joint-venture between Walt Disney Television Animation and Jetix Europe N.V. for producing shows that would air on Jetix channels and blocks all across the world.

- Super Robot Monkey Team Hyperforce Go! (2004)
- Get Ed (2005)
- Yin Yang Yo! (2006)

=== Latin America ===
| Title | Spanish title | Note(s) | Source(s) |
|---|---|---|---|
| Action Man | | | (Note: Program transitioned from Fox Kids.) |
| The Addams Family | Los Locos Addams la serie animada | | |
| Beyblade | | | |
| Black Hole High | El Colegio del Agujero Negro | | |
| Braceface | Dientes de Lata | | |
| Brats of the Lost Nebula | Chicos intergalactícos | | |
| Bureau of Alien Detectors | Oficina de Detectores de Extraterrestres | | |
| Casi ángeles | | season 1 only; South America exclusive | (Note: Also shown on Disney Channel in Latin America and Brazil.) |
| Chaotic | | | (Note: Program transitioned to Disney XD.) |
| Class of the Titans | Academia de Titanes | | |
| Code Lyoko | | premiered August 1, 2004 | |
| Cosmic Quantum Ray | El cósmico Quantum Ray | | |
| Da Boom Crew | Equipo Da Boom | | |
| Dark Oracle | Los Misterios del Oráculo | premiered December 3, 2005 | |
| Dave the Barbarian | Dave, El Bárbaro | | |
| Dinosaur King | Dino Rey | | |
| Eon Kid | | | |
| Even Stevens | Mano a Mano | | |
| The Fairly OddParents | Los Padrinos Mágicos | seasons 1-5 only | |
| Fantastic Four | Los 4 Fantásticos | | |
| FARMkids | Animalocos/Animalucos | | |
| Fillmore! | | premiered August 2, 2004 | |
| Fox Kids Cup | Copa Fox Kids | | |
| Funky Cops | | | |
| G.I. Joe: Sigma 6 | | | |
| Gadget & the Gadgetinis | Gadget y Los Gadgetinis | | |
| Gargoyles | Gárgolas: héroes góticos | | |
| George of the Jungle | George de La Selva | | |
| Goosebumps | Escalofríos | | |
| Grossology | Grotescologia | | |
| The Incredible Hulk | Hulk: El hombre increible | | |
| Jetix Cup | Copa Jetix | | |
| Jibber Jabber | | | |
| A Kind of Magic | Mi Familia Mágica | | |
| Kirby: Right Back at Ya! | Kirby | Tooned Out (Caricaturizados) unaired | |
| League of Super Evil | Liga de súper malvados | | |
| Medabots | | | |
| MegaMan NT Warrior | | | |
| Mighty Morphin Power Rangers | Power Rangers | | |
| Monster Allergy | | | |
| Moville Mysteries | Los Misterios de Moville | | |
| The Mummy | La Momia | | |
| The New Addams Family | Los Nuevos Locos Addams | | |
| The New Woody Woodpecker Show | El nuevo show del pájaro loco | | |
| Phil of the Future | Phil del Futuro | | |
| Power Rangers in Space | Power Rangers en el espacio | | |
| Power Rangers Lightspeed Rescue | Power Rangers a la Velocidad de la Luz | | |
| Power Rangers Lost Galaxy | Power Rangers La Galaxia Perdida | | |
| Power Rangers Ninja Storm | Power Rangers: A Tempestade Ninja | | |
| Power Rangers Time Force | Power Rangers Força do Tempo | | |
| Power Rangers Turbo | | | |
| Power Rangers Wild Force | Power Rangers Força Animal | | |
| Power Rangers Zeo | | | |
| The Secret Show | El Show Secreto | | |
| Shaman King | | | |
| Silverwing | | | |
| Skunk Fu! | Zorrino Kung Fu | | |
| So Weird | Qué Raro | | |
| Sonic X | | | |
| Space Goofs | Casa de mutantes | | |
| Spider-Man: The Animated Series | El Hombre Araña | | |
| Spider-Man and His Amazing Friends | El hombre sorprendente araña y sus increíbles amigos | | |
| Spider-Man Unlimited | El Hombre Araña Sin Límites | | |
| Spliced | Isla de mutantes | | |
| The Spooky Sisters | Hermanitas Mysteria | | |
| Super Duper Sumos | Súper Sumos | | |
| SuperNormal | | | |
| Teacher's Pet | La Mascota de la Clase | | |
| Teamo Supremo | | | |
| Teenage Mutant Ninja Turtles | Las Tortugas Ninja | | |
| Teenage Mutant Ninja Turtles: Back to the Sewer | Las Tortugas Ninja: De regreso a la alcantarilla | | |
| Teenage Mutant Ninja Turtles: Fast Forward | Las Tortugas Ninja: Fast Forward | | |
| Tito Cortito's Shorts | Los Cortitos de Tito Cortito | this show features Monstories (Monstorietas), The Owl (El búho), Minuscule (Minúsculo), Bernard (Bernardo), Shaun the Sheep (La oveja Shaun), and Trash Valley (Valle Basura) | |
| Totally Spies! | Tres Espías Sin Límite | seasons 1 and 2 only | |
| Transformers: Armada | | | |
| Transformers: Energon | | | |
| Transformers: Cybertron | | | |
| Ultimate Muscle | Kid Músculo | | |
| VR Troopers | | | |
| What's with Andy? | Las Locuras de Andy | | |
| Wheel Squad | | | |
| Wicked Science | Ciencia Traviesa | premiered August 1, 2004 | |
| Wolverine and the X-Men | Wolverine e os X-Men | | |
| The Woody Woodpecker Show | El Pájaro Loco | | |
| X-Men: The Animated Series | Hombres x | | |
| Zorro | El Zorro | | |

==== Shorts/Interstitials ====
| Title | Spanish title | Note(s) | Source(s) |
|---|---|---|---|
| Batallón | | with Tommy Energy, Ursa and Bonecrusher | |
| Bernard | Bernardo | | |
| Beyblade: Rop Zone 2 | Bayblader: Rip Zone 2 | | |
| Chaotic Scanner | Scanner Chaotic | | |
| Code Lyoko: Character | Code Lyoko: Personaje | | |
| Game Tester | | | |
| The Informants | Los Informadores | | |
| Jetix Cup Presents: Electronic Dictionary | Copa Jetix presenta: Diccionario electrónico | Sequel to Fox Kids | |
| Jetix Cup Presents: Fan Duel | Copa Jetix presenta: Duelo de Fanáticos | | |
| Jetix Cup Presents: National Star | Copa Jetix presenta: Estrella Nacional | The Heroes of Rio de Janeiro 2005 | |
| Jetix Cup Presents: Question Blitz | Copa Jetix presenta: Goleada de Preguntas | | |
| Jetix Cup Presents: Training | Copa Jetix presenta: Entrenamiento | Led by Professor Quique Wolff [Jetix Cup 2005] | |
| Minuscule | Minúsculo | | |
| Monstories | Monstorietas | | |
| NotiJetix | | | |
| Oswald | Otra estrella rutilante en el firmamento de Jetix | | |
| The Owl | El búho | | |
| Power Rangers: Extreme Red | Power Rangers: Rojo Extremo | | |
| Pucca Funny Love | | | |
| Ranger Namer | Nombrador Ranger | | |
| Soccer with Juan Carlos | Futbol con JuanCarlos | Sequel to Fox Kids | |
| The Spooky Sisters | Hermanitas Mysteria | | |
| Team Smithereen | Equipo Peligro | | |
| Trash Valley | Valle Basura | | |
| What Kind of Monkey Are You? | ¿Que clase de mono eres? | from the series Super Robot Monkey Team Hyperforce Go! | |
| X Cam | | Sequel to Fox Kids | |

==== Movies/Specials ====
| Title | Spanish title | Note(s) | Source(s) |
|---|---|---|---|
| 3 Ninjas | Tres ninjas | | |
| 3 Ninjas Kick Back | 3 ninjas al rescate | | |
| 3 Ninjas Knuckle Up | El regreso de los pequeños ninjas | premiered January 21, 2007 | |
| 3 Ninjas: High Noon at Mega Mountain | 3 ninjas: Mediodía en la Megamontaña/3 ninjas: meio-dia na Megamontanha | | |
| Action Man: Robot Atak | Action Man: Ataque de los Robots | | |
| Action Man: X-Missions - Code Gangrene | Action Man Misiones X vs. Código Gangrena | | |
| Action Man: X Missions - The Movie | Action Man Misiones X: La película | | |
| The Adventures of Rocky and Bullwinkle | Las aventuras de Rocky y Bullwinkle | | |
| The Adventures of Sharkboy and Lavagirl | Las aventuras de Sharkboy y Lavagirl | | |
| Air Bud: Spikes Back | Air Bud Contra-Ataca | | |
| The Amazing Zorro | El Increíble Zorro | premiered April 10, 2005 | |
| Antz | Hormiguitaz | | |
| Are We There Yet? | Quieren Volverme Loco | | |
| Atlantis: The Lost Empire | Atlantis: El reino perdido | premiered October 3, 2008 | |
| Atlantis: Milo's Return | Atlantis II: El regreso de Milo | | |
| Baby Geniuses | Pequeños genios | | |
| Back to the Future | Volver al futuro | | |
| Back to the Future Part II | Volver al futuro: Parte II | | |
| Back to the Future Part III | Volver al futuro: Parte III | | |
| The Barefoot Executive | O Chimpanzé Manda-Chuva | | |
| Bingo | | | |
| Bionicle: Mask of Light | Bionicle: La máscara de la luz | | |
| Bionicle 2: Legends of Metru Nui | Bionicle 2: Leyendas de Metru Nui | | |
| Bionicle 3: Web of Shadows | Bionicle 3: Telaraña de sombras | | |
| Blank Check | Cheque en blanco | | |
| The Brainiacs.com | Estrategias infantiles | | |
| Camp Rock | | premiered July 30, 2008 | |
| Casper | Gasparin la película | premiered June 13, 2008 | |
| Casper Meets Wendy | Casper y la mágica Wendy | | |
| Chicken Run | Pollitos en fuga | premiered August 1, 2004 | |
| The ChubbChubbs Save Xmas | Los ChubbChubbs salvan la Navidad | | |
| Class of the Titans: The Movie | Academia de titanes, la película/Academia de Titanes: O Filme | | |
| Cool Runnings | Jamaica bajo cero | | |
| Daddy Day Care | La guardería de papá | | |
| Dennis the Menace | Daniel el travieso | | |
| Dennis the Menace: Cruise Control | Daniel el travieso: Vacaciones en el mar | | |
| Dick Tracy | | | |
| Digimon: The Movie | Digimon La Película | | |
| Digimon: World Tour | La gira mundial de Digimon | | |
| Dinosaur | Dinosaurio | | |
| Dragons: Fire and Ice | Dragões: Fogo e Gelo | | |
| Durango Kids | | | |
| ESPERTOS.com | | | |
| The Even Stevens Movie | Mano a mano: La película | | |
| E.T. the Extra-Terrestrial | ET, el extraterrestre | | |
| The Fairly OddParents: Abra-Catastrophe! | Los Padrinos Mágicos: ¡Abra Catástrofe! | | |
| The Fairly OddParents: Channel Chasers | Los Padrinos Mágicos: Cazadores de Canales | | |
| The Fairly OddParents: School's Out!: The Musical | Los padrinos mágicos: ¡Se acabó la escuela! El musical | | |
| The Flintstones | Los Picapiedras | | |
| The Flintstones in Viva Rock Vegas | Los Picapiedra en Viva Rock Vegas | | |
| Flubber | | | |
| Gargoyles the Movie: The Heroes Awaken | Gárgolas, el despertar | | |
| George of the Jungle | George de la selva | | |
| Ghostbusters | Los Cazafantasmas | | |
| Ghostbusters II | | | |
| Good Boy! | Un perro de otro mundo | | |
| The Goonies | Los Goonies/O Goonies | | |
| Halloweentown | | premiered October 10, 2008 | |
| Halloweentown II: Kalabar's Revenge | Halloweentown II: La Venganza | premiered October 17, 2008 | |
| The Haunted Mansion | La Mansión Embrujada | premiered June 6, 2008 | |
| The Haunted Pumpkin of Sleepy Hollow | La calabaza embrujada de Sleepy Hollow | | |
| Heavyweights | Pesos completos | | |
| Hercules | Hércules | | |
| Home on the Range | Vacas vaqueras | | |
| Homeward Bound: The Incredible Journey | Volviendo a casa: Una aventura increíble | | |
| Holes | El misterio de los excavadores | | |
| Hook | El regreso del Capitán Garfio | | |
| Hot Wheels: AcceleRacers: Breaking Point | AcceleRacers: Breaking Point | | |
| Hot Wheels: AcceleRacers: Ignition | AcceleRacers: Ignition | | |
| Hot Wheels: AcceleRacers: Speed of Silence | AcceleRacers: Speed of Silence | | |
| Hot Wheels: AcceleRacers: The Ultimate Race | AcceleRacers: A última corrida | | |
| Hounded | Perseguido | | |
| How the Grinch Stole Christmas | El Grinch | | |
| I Downloaded a Ghost | Descargué a un fantasma | | |
| Inspector Gadget | | | |
| Inspector Gadget 2 | | | |
| Inspector Gadget's Biggest Caper Ever | Inspector Gadget y el pterodáctilo | | |
| Inspector Gadget's Last Case: Claw's Revenge | Inspector Gadget: Último Caso | | |
| James and the Giant Peach | Jim y el durazno gigante | | |
| Jetsons: The Movie | Los Supersónicos: La película | | |
| Johnny Tsunami | | | |
| Joseph: King of Dreams | José, el rey de los/José: O Rei dos Sonhos | | |
| Jumanji | | | |
| The Jungle Book | El libro de la selva | | |
| Kiki's Delivery Service | Kiki: Entregas a domicilio | | |
| The Legend of Zorro | La leyenda del Zorro | | |
| The Luck of the Irish | La suerte del irlandés | | |
| The Mask of Zorro | la máscara del zorro | | |
| Men in Black | Hombres de negro | | |
| The Mighty Ducks | Los campeones | | |
| Mighty Joe Young | Joe | | |
| Mr. Magoo | | | |
| The Muppet Christmas Carol | Una Navidad con los Muppets | | |
| Muppets from Space | Muppets Show Space | | |
| My Favorite Martian | Mi marciano favorito | | |
| National Treasure | La leyenda del tesoro perdido | | |
| The Night Before Christmas: A Mouse Tale | La víspera de Navidad: el cuento de un ratón | | |
| The Nightmare Before Christmas | El extraño mundo de Jack | premiered June 20, 2008 | |
| Nine Dog Christmas | Ladridos en Navidad | | |
| Now You See It... | Nada por aquí | | |
| The Nutty Professor | El profesor chiflado | | |
| Nutty Professor II: The Klumps | El profesor chiflado 2 | | |
| Ogu and Mampato in Rapa Nui | Ogú y Mampato en Rapa Nui | | |
| Oliver & Company | Oliver y su pandilla | | |
| Open Season | Open Season: Amigos salvajes | | |
| Pokémon 4Ever | Pokémon x siempre: Celebi, la voz del bosque | | |
| Pokémon Heroes | Héroes Pokémon: Latios y Latias | | |
| Princess of Thieves | La princesa de los ladrones | | |
| Pirates of the Caribbean: The Curse of the Black Pearl | Piratas del Caribe: La maldición del Perla Negra | | |
| Popeye | Popeye: La película | | |
| The Prince of Egypt | El príncipe de Egipto | | |
| Richie Rich | Ricky Ricón | | |
| Richie Rich's Christmas Wish | El deseo navideño de Ricky Ricón | | |
| The Road to El Dorado | El camino hacia El Dorado | | |
| RocketMan | | | |
| Scary Godmother: The Revenge of Jimmy | La Madrina Tenebrosa/A Madrinha Tenebrosa | | |
| The Scream Team | El Equipo del Grito | premiered June 27, 2008 | |
| Shrek | | | |
| Silverwing: A Glimpse of the Sun | | | |
| Silverwing: Redemption | | | |
| Silverwing: Towers of Fire | | | |
| Sinbad: Legend of the Seven Seas | Sinbad: La leyenda de los siete mares | | |
| Small Soldiers | Pequeños guerreros | | |
| Soccer Dog: The Movie | El perro futbolista | | |
| Special Wednesday | Quanta Especial | | |
| Spider-Man vs. the Green Goblin | O homem aranha vs o Duende verde | | |
| Spirit: Stallion of the Cimarron | Spirit: El corcel indomable | | |
| Spirited Away | El viaje de Chihiro | | |
| Spy Kids | Pequenos Espiões | | |
| Spy Kids 2: The Island of Lost Dreams | Mini Espías 2: La isla de los sueños perdidos | | |
| Spy Kids 3-D: Game Over | Pequenos Espiões 3D | | |
| Stuart Little | Stuart Little: Un ratón en la familia | | |
| Stuart Little 2 | | | |
| Super Mario Bros. | | | |
| Treasure Island Kids 2: The Monster of Treasure Island | La isla del tesoro 2: El monstruo de la isla del tesoro | | |
| The Three Musketeers | Los Tres Mosqueteros | | |
| Treasure Planet | El Planeta del Tesoro | | |
| Tron | | | |
| Wallace & Gromit: A Close Shave | Wallace & Gromit: Una afeitada al ras | | |
| Wallace & Gromit: A Grand Day Out | Wallace y Gromit: Un día de campo en la luna | | |
| Wallace & Gromit: The Wrong Trousers | Wallace y Gromit: Los pantalones equivocados | | |
| Who Framed Roger Rabbit | ¿Quién engañó a Roger Rabbit? | | |
| Wicked Science: The Movie | Ciencia Traviesa, la película | | |
| Zathura: A Space Adventure | Zathura: Una Aventura Espacial | | |

==== Blocks ====
| Title | Spanish title | Note(s) | Source(s) |
|---|---|---|---|
| Anime Invasion | Invasión animé | | |
| Cineskopio | | August 1, 2004 - July 2, 2009 | |
| Double Blade | Doble Blade | | |
| Double Load | Doble Carga | | |
| Mysteries | Mysteria | | |
| Specials | Especiales | | |
| Super Hours | SuperHoras | | |
| Who's in Control? | ¿Quién Tiene El Control? | | |

== Asia ==
=== India ===
- American Dragon: Jake Long
- Aryamaan – Brahmaand Ka Yodha
- Dennis the Menace
- Detective Conan
- Didi's Comedy Show (premiered May 7, 2007)
- Fantastic Four
- Gargoyles
- G.I. Joe: Sigma 6
- Goosebumps
- Hero – Bhakti Hi Shakti Hai
- The Incredible Hulk
- Inspector Gadget
- Martin Mystery
- Monster Warriors
- Power Rangers Lightspeed Rescue
- Power Rangers Lost Galaxy
- Power Rangers RPM
- Power Rangers Wild Force
- Rat-Man
- So Weird
- Spider-Man
- Spider-Man: The Animated Series
- Spider-Man and His Amazing Friends
- Spider-Man Unlimited
- Storm Hawks (premiered April 21, 2008)
- The Owl
- Total Drama Island (premiered March 21, 2009)
- Tutenstein (premiered October 17, 2005)
- Urban Vermin (premiered April 21, 2008)
- Vicky & Vetaal
- World of Quest
- WWE 24X7 (premiered May 7, 2007)
- X-Men
- Zoran

==== Movies ====
- 20,000 Leagues Under the Sea
- The Amazing Zorro
- Casper
- Casper: A Spirited Beginning
- Casper Meets Wendy
- Finding Nemo
- Flubber
- Gargoyles the Movie: The Heroes Awaken
- George of the Jungle
- George of the Jungle 2
- Herbie: Fully Loaded
- Halloweentown
- Hulk
- Inspector Gadget's Last Case
- Monsters, Inc.
- Right on Track
- Sky High
- Tarzan
- X-Men

=== Japan ===
- RoboDz (short series) - originally titled Robodiez
- Shaman King (シャーマンキング)

== Europe ==
- Azumanga Daioh (Bulgaria exclusive)
- Bad Dog
- Bernard (short series) (Spain exclusive)
- Bobobo-bo Bo-bobo (2004 premiere; 1 season)
- Braceface
- Captain Flamingo (2006 premiere; 3 seasons)
- Diabolik (1999–2001) (also aired on Fox Kids)
- Dinosaur King
- Eek! The Cat
- The Elephant Princess
- Funky Cops
- Gadget & the Gadgetinis (2002)
- Hamtaro (2002)
- H_{2}O: Just Add Water
- Iggy Arbuckle - acquired February 2007, to be broadcast from August 2007
- Iron Kid - bought from BRB Internacional for Jetix Latin America in January 2007; it was already showing in France and Spain
- Iznogoud
- Jacob Two-Two
- Jim Button
- Kid Paddle (Spain exclusive)
- The Kids from Room 402
- LazyTown
- Let's Go Quintuplets!
- Magi-Nation (2008)
- Martin Mystery
- Mega Babies
- MegaMan NT Warrior
- Mimi and Mr. Bobo
- The New Woody Woodpecker Show (2004–09) (also aired on Fox Kids)
- One Piece (October 14, 2006, on Jetix Max Spain)
- Planet Sketch
- Pokémon (seasons 1–12)
- Pretty Cure (October 14, 2006, on Jetix Max Spain) - Toei Animation
- RoboRoach
- Saban's Adventures of Oliver Twist
- The Secret Files of the Spy Dogs
- The Secret Life of Suckers (short series)
- Shaman King
- Shaolin Wuzang
- Shin-chan (Vitello and Phuuz dubs)
- Skunk Fu!
- Sonic X
- Team Smithereen (short series; online exclusive)
- Totally Spies!
- Transformers: Animated
- The Triplets
- Tutenstein
- Urban Vermin
- Walter Melon
- What's with Andy?
- Wicked Science
- World of Quest (2008)
- Wunschpunsch
- Yu-Gi-Oh! Duel Monsters
- Yu-Gi-Oh! GX
- Yu-Gi-Oh! 5D's

=== France ===
- Action Man
- American Dragon: Jake Long
- Danny & Daddy (short series)
- Dennis the Menace
- Digimon: Digital Monsters (series 3 only)
- Fantaghirò
- Flint the Time Detective
- Funky Cops
- Gadget & the Gadgetinis
- Iron Kid
- Jason and the Heroes of Mount Olympus
- Jayce and the Wheeled Warriors
- Lilo & Stitch: The Series
- M.A.S.K.
- Medabots
- MegaMan NT Warrior
- Michel Vaillant
- Mon Colle Knights
- Pokémon (series 1 only)
- Pokemon: Diamond and Pearl
- Popples
- The Powerpuff Girls
- RoboRoach
- Shaman King
- Shaolin Wuzang
- Shin-chan
- S.O.S. Croco!
- Sonic Underground
- Sonic X
- Teenage Mutant Ninja Turtles
- Totally Spies!
- Transformers: Animated
- Urban Vermin
- Viewtiful Joe
- Walter Melon
- X-Men: The Animated Series

==== Movies ====
- Pokémon: Giratina & the Sky Warrior
- Pokémon: Lucario and the Mystery of Mew
- Pokémon: The Rise of Darkrai
- Pokémon Ranger and the Temple of the Sea

=== Germany ===
- Benjamin the Elephant (Note: Program transitioned from Fox Kids in Germany.)
- Big Bad Beetleborgs
- Big Wolf on Campus
- Bobby's World
- Braceface (one episode only)
- Butt-Ugly Martians
- The Cramp Twins
- Dennis the Menace
- Eerie, Indiana: The Other Dimension
- Flint the Time Detective
- Goosebumps
- Martin Mystery
- Medabots
- Mega Babies
- MegaMan NT Warrior
- The New Addams Family
- Pig City
- Pokémon
- Power Rangers Lost Galaxy
- Power Rangers Wild Force
- Shaman King
- Shin-chan
- The Simpsons
- So Little Time
- Spheriks
- Spider-Man and His Amazing Friends
- The Three Friends and Jerry
- Totally Spies!
- What's with Andy?
- Yu-Gi-Oh! Duel Monsters

==== Movies/Specials ====
- Donner
- Thank Heaven

=== Greece ===
- Bobby's World (Ο Κόσμος του Μπόμπι) (Note: Program transitioned from Fox Kids in Greece.)
- Bobobo-bo Bo-bobo
- Camp Candy (Κατασκήνωση Κάντι)
- Daigunder (Νταϊγκούντερ)
- Dark Oracle (Σκοτεινή Προφητεία)
- Dennis the Menace (Ντένις, ο Τρομερός)
- Diabolik (Diabolik: Στα Ίχνη του Πάνθηρα / Κεραυνός)
- Dungeons & Dragons (Μάγοι και Δράκοι)
- Eek! The Cat (Ικ ο Τρελόγατος)
- Famous 5: On the Case
- Fantastic Four (Οι Τέσσερις Φανταστικοί (1994))
- Fantastic Four: World's Greatest Heroes (Οι Τέσσερις Φανταστικοί (2006))
- Flint the Time Detective (Φλιντ, ο Ντετέκτιβ του Χρόνου / Ο Ταξιδιώτης του Χρόνου)
- Gadget & the Gadgetinis (Αστυνόμος Σαΐνης & Μικροί Σαΐνηδες)
- Gadget Boy (Γκάτζετ Μπόι / Ο Μικρός Σαΐνης)
- I Got a Rocket!
- Iggy Arbuckle (Ίγκι Άρμπακλ)
- The Incredible Hulk (Ο Απίθανος Χαλκ)
- Inspector Gadget (Αστυνόμος Σαΐνης / Επιθεωρητής Σαΐνης)
- Iron Man: Armored Adventures (Iron Man: Οι Πρώτες Περιπέτειες)
- Iron Man
- Jim Button (Τζιμ Μπάτον)
- LazyTown (Τεμπελοχώρα)
- Let's Go Quintuplets! (Τα Πεντάδυμα)
- Life with Louie (Η Ζωή με τον Λούη)
- Mad Jack the Pirate (Τρελο-Τζακ ο Πειρατής)
- Magi-Nation
- Martin Mystery
- MegaMan NT Warrior
- Mighty Morphin Alien Rangers
- Mighty Morphin Power Rangers (Πάουερ Ρέηντζερς)
- Mon Colle Knights (Οι Ιππότες του Μονκόλ)
- NASCAR Racers (Οδηγοί Πίστας)
- Planet Sketch (Ο Πλανήτης των Σκίτσων)
- Pokémon (Πόκεμον)
- Power Rangers in Space (Power Rangers στο Διάστημα)
- Power Rangers Lost Galaxy
- Power Rangers Turbo (Power Rangers: Τούρμπο)
- Power Rangers Zeo (Ζίο Πάουερ Ρέιντζερς)
- RoboRoach (Ρομποκατσαρίδας)
- Saban's Adventures of Oliver Twist (Οι Περιπέτειες του Όλιβερ Τουίστ)
- The Secret Files of the Spy Dogs (Σκυλιά σε Μυστικές Αποστολές)
- Shaman King (Σαμάνος Πρίγκιπας)
- Silver Surfer
- Sonic X
- Spider-Man: The Animated Series (Σπάιντερμαν, ο Άνθρωπος Αράχνη)
- Spider-Man Unlimited
- The Three Friends and Jerry (Τρεις Φίλοι κι ο Τζέρι / Η Συμμορία και ο Τζέρι)
- Totally Spies!
- Transformers: Robots in Disguise (Transformers: Αυτοκίνητα-Ρομπότ)
- Tutenstein (Τουτενστάιν, Η Μικρή Μούμια)
- Urban Vermin
- Walter Melon (Γουόλτερ Μέλον)
- What's with Andy? (Κάτι Τρέχει με τον Άντυ)
- The Why Why Family (Θέλω να Μάθω Γιατί)
- World of Quest
- Wunschpunsch (Άμπρα Κατάμπρα)
- X-Men: The Animated Series (Οι Αήττητοι X-Men / Ομάδα Χ)
- X-Men: Evolution

==== Movies/Specials ====
- National Lampoon's Golf Punks (Golf Punks)
- Ice Angel (Στον Δρόμο για το Χρυσό)
- Richie Rich's Christmas Wish (Η Χριστουγεννιάτικη Ευχή του Ρίτσι)
- Rocket's Red Glare (Αποστολή Ερμής)
- Rusty: The Great Rescue

=== Israel ===
- Balagan (בלאגן)
- Balagan to Eilat (בלאגן ועד אילת)
- B.I.L.I. (ב.י.ל.י)
- Black Hole High (תיכון בלק הול)
- Camp Candy (מחנה טופי)
- Children of Peace (ילדים של שלום)
- Class Diary (יומן כיתה)
- Comi Comi (קומי קומי)
- Dennis the Menace (דני שובבני)
- Diabolik (דיאבוליק)
- Digimon: Digital Monsters (דיג'ימון4) (Note: An umbrella name for Digimon Adventure, Adventure 02, Tamers, and Frontier.)
- Doraemon (דורימון)
- Eek! The Cat (איק)
- Even Stevens (אצל סטיבנס)
- Flint the Time Detective (פלינט בלש הזמן)
- Floricienta (פלוריסיינטה) - Season 2 only
- Freaky Stories (סיפורים מוזרים)
- Goosebumps (צמרמורת)
- Gur and Oah (גור ואוח)
- Hamtaro (המטארו)
- H_{2}O: Just Add Water (H20)
- In Front of Everyone (מול כולם)
- Inspector Gadget (גאדג'ט מפקח)
- Jason and the Heroes of Mount Olympus (ג'ייסון והגיבורים)
- Jim Button (ג'ים בוטן)
- Kidd Video (קיד וידאו)
- Kim Possible (קים פוסיבול)
- The Legend of Tarzan (טרזן)
- Lilo & Stitch: The Series (לילו וסטיץ')
- Lizzie McGuire (ליזי מקגווייר)
- Maor's Sparks (הניצוצות של מאור)
- MegaMan NT Warrior (מגה-מן)
- NASCAR Racers (נאסקר)
- The New Addams Family (משפחת אדאמס החדשה)
- Peter Pan: The Animated Series (פיטר פן)
- Pig City (עיר החזירים)
- Planet Sketch (המוטרפים)
- Power Rangers in Space (פאוור ריינג'רס בחלל)
- Power Rangers Lightspeed Rescue (פאוור ריינג'רס צוות הצלה)
- Power Rangers Ninja Storm (פאוור ריינג'רס סופת הנינג'ה)
- Power Rangers Wild Force (פאוור ריינג'רס - כח הסערה)
- Princess Sissi (סיסי הנסיכה)
- The Ripping Friends (האחים ריפינג)
- RoboRoach (רובוג'וק)
- Saban's Adventures of Oliver Twist (אוליבר טוויסט)
- Samurai Pizza Cats (החתולים הסמוראים)
- Shaman King (שאמן קינג)
- Shaolin Wuzang (שאולין ווזאנג)
- Shinzo (שינזו)
- Smurfs' Adventures (דרדסים)
- So Little Time (מזל תאומות)
- Sonic X (סוניקX)
- Spider-Man 5000 (ספיידרמן 5000)
- Star Blazers (חלוצי החלל)
- Sweet Valley High (תיכון סוויט ואלי)
- Totally Spies! (טוטלי ספייס)
- Transformers: Cybertron (רובוטריקים סייברטרון)
- Wunschpunsch (אונץ' פונץ')
- X-Men (אקסמן)
- Zombie Hotel (זומבי הוטל)

=== Italy ===
- Action Man (Note: Program transitioned from Fox Kids in Italy.)
- Adventures of Sonic the Hedgehog (Le Avventure di Sonic)
- Argai: The Prophecy (Argai)
- Big Wolf on Campus (Un lupo mannaro americano a scuola) (premiered March 1, 2006)
- Binchō-tan
- Black Hole High
- Bobobo-bo Bo-bobo (premiered September 3, 2007)
- Camera Crack Ups (short series) (premiered December 2005)
- Creepy Crawlers (La fabbrica dei mostri) (premiered 2005)
- Dennis the Menace (Denny)
- Eerie, Indiana (Gli acchiappamostri)
- Evolution: The Animated Series (Evolution - La serie animata) (premiered March 1, 2005)
- The Fairly OddParents (Due fantagenitori)
- Fairy Tale Police Department (Polizia Dipartimento Favole)
- Fantastic Four (I fantastici quattro)
- Flint the Time Detective (Flint, a spasso nel tempo)
- Funky Cops
- F-Zero: GP Legend (premiered November 7, 2005)
- Goosebumps (Piccoli brividi)
- Growing Up With Hello Kitty (Hello Kitty)
- Heathcliff (Isidoro)
- Iggy Arbuckle (Iggy Piggy Ranger) (premiered August 2008)
- The Incredible Hulk (1982) (L'incredibile Hulk (1982))
- The Incredible Hulk (1996) (L'incredibile Hulk (1996))
- Inspector Gadget (L'ispettore Gadget)
- Iron Man
- Iznogoud (Chi la fa l'aspetti)
- Jackie Chan Adventures (Le avventure di Jacky Chan) (premiered September 3, 2007)
- Jacob Two-Two (Jacob Due Due) (premiered September 2005)
- Jim Button (Jim Bottone)
- Jin Jin and the Panda Patrol (Tutti in viaggio verso Pandalandia)
- Kangoo
- Let's Go Quintuplets! (Cinque gemelli diversi) (premiered September 11, 2006)
- Los Luchadores (premiered November 2007)
- Masters of Combat (also shown on GXT)
- MegaMan NT Warrior (premiered April 4, 2005)
- Monster Allergy (premiered July 2009)
- Moville Mysteries (I misteri di Mosley)
- Mr. Bean: The Animated Series (Mr. Bean)
- My Parents Are Aliens (Papà e Mamma sono alieni)
- NASCAR Racers (premiered May 1, 2005)
- The New Addams Family (La nuova famiglia Addams) (premiered January 2009)
- Pig City (premiered 2005)
- Power Rangers Ninja Storm
- Rebelde Way (episode 1 only)
- RoboRoach (premiered January 2006)
- Saban's Around the World in Eighty Dreams (80 sogni per viaggiare)
- Saban's Adventures of Oliver Twist (Oliver Twist) (premiered July 2005)
- Sabrina: The Animated Series (Sabrina) (premiered November 2007)
- Sabrina's Secret Life (Sabrina - La mia vita segreta) (premiered November 2007)
- Shaman King (premiered September 11, 2006)
- So Little Time (Due gemelle e un maggiordomo)
- Sonic X
- Sooty's Amazing Adventures (Le avventure di Sooty) (premiered 2005)
- Sophie and Virginia (Sophie e Vivianne: due sorelle e un'avventura)
- Spider-Man: The Animated Series (Spiderman)
- Spider-Man and His Amazing Friends (L'Uomo Ragno e i suoi fantastici amici)
- Sweet Valley High
- Takeshi's Castle (premiered September 2004) (also shown on GXT)
- Teenage Mutant Ninja Turtles (Tartarughe Ninja) (seasons 1-4 only) (premiered October 17, 2005)
- Totally Spies! (Che magnifiche spie!)
- Tracey McBean
- Transformers: Animated (premiered March 2, 2009)
- Transformers: Armada
- Transformers: Robots in Disguise (Transformers)
- The Triplets (Tre gemelle e una strega)
- Tutenstein
- Ultimate Muscle (premiered March 1, 2005)
- Urban Vermin (I Netturbani) (premiered July 2008)
- Walter Melon (Walter eroe a tempo perso)
- What's with Andy? (Andy il re degli scherzi)
- World of Quest (Il mondo di Quest) (premiered June 1, 2009)
- Wunschpunsch (Grog di Magog) (premiered July 2005)
- X-DuckX (premiered June 2006)
- X-Men (Insuperabili X-Men)
- Xyber 9: New Dawn (Xyber 9)

==== Movies ====
- Asterix and Cleopatra (Asterix e Cleopatra)
- Asterix the Gaul (Asterix il gallico)
- Meet the Robinsons (I Robinson - Una famiglia spaziale)
- Pokémon: Diamond and Pearl: Battle Dimension (Pokémon Diamante e Perla: Battle Dimension) (premiered March 30, 2009)
- Pokémon: Giratina & the Sky Warrior (Pokémon: Giratina e il guerriero dei cieli) (premiered April 11, 2009)
- The Twelve Tasks of Asterix (Le 12 fatiche di Asterix)

=== Netherlands ===
- Angela Anaconda (2002-2004) (JETIX block)
- Atomic Betty (2006-2007)
- Bad Dog (2006-2008)
- Black Hole High (2004) (JETIX block)
- Bob the Builder (2002-2009; Jetix Play, transferred to Playhouse) (also aired on Fox Kids)
- Bobby's World (1999-2005)
- Bobo TV (2003-2005; Jetix Play)
- Bobobo-bo Bo-bobo (2007-2008)
- Braceface (2001-2005)
- Buiten Spelen (2006)
- Camera Crack Ups (Clip/Crack Up) (2004) (short series) (JETIX block)
- Captain Flamingo (2006-2009)
- Carl² (2006-2010)
- Cars (2004-2005) (Auto's)
- Cartoon Cup (2007)
- Casper's Scare School (2009-2010)
- The Club of Sinterklaas (1999-2009)
- Code Lyoko (2007)
- Connie the Cow
- Daigunder (2003-2005)
- Dinosaur King (2009-2010)
- Disney's American Dragon: Jake Long (2009-2010)
- Disney's Fillmore! (2008-2009)
- Disney's Kim Possible (2007-2009)
- Disney's The Legend of Tarzan (2007-2009)
- Disney's Lilo & Stitch: The Series (2008-2010)
- Disney's Phineas & Ferb (2008-2010)
- Disney's The Proud Family (2009)
- Disney's Recess (2008-2009)
- Disney's The Replacements (2008-2009)
- Disney's Timon & Pumbaa (2008-2009)
- Disney's The Weekenders (2009-2010)
- Dragon Tales
- Eek! The Cat (1997-2006)
- Ernst, Bobbie and the Others (2002-2009)
- Famous 5: On the Case (2009)
- Film (2009)
- Finley the Fire Engine (2008-2009; Jetix Play)
- Franklin (2002-2005; Jetix Play)
- Funky Cops (2004-2005)
- Ga Voor Gezond (2006)
- Gadget & the Gadgetinis (2004-2007)
- Hamtaro (2004-2007; Jetix Play)
- Hannah Montana (2008-2009)
- Harry and His Bucket Full of Dinosaurs (2006-2008; Jetix Play)
- Hasbro Game Day Tips & Tricks (2006)
- He-Man and the Masters of the Universe (2004) (JETIX block)
- Hello Kitty's Paradise (2003-2005)
- Honeybee Hutch (2000-2005) (JETIX block)
- Horseland (2006-2008)
- HotNews.nl (2005-2007)
- Huntik: Secrets & Seekers (2009)
- Iggy Arbuckle (2007-2009)
- In the Night Garden... (2008-2009)
- Iznogoud (2002-2007)
- Jack & Marcel (2006) (short series)
- Jackie Chan Adventures (2009-2010)
- Jacob Two-Two (2006-2009)
- Jam Hot (2003-2005) (short series)
- JETIX Adventure
- JETIX FlimFlits (2003-2009) (formerly Fox Kids FlimFlits)
- JETIX Max (2006-2007)
- JETIX Megatalent (2009)
- JETIX Planet Live (2004-2007) (formerly Fox Kids Planet Live)
- JETIX Pretpark Challenge
- JETIX Studio (2004-2008)
- JETIX Surprise
- Jim Button (2003-2006)
- The Kids from Room 402 (2001-2006)
- Kids Top 20 (2003-2009)
- A Kind of Magic (2009-2010)
- The Koala Brothers (2004-2008)
- Let's Go Quintuplets! (2004-2006; 2009–2010)
- Life with Louie (1997-2005)
- Lizzie McGuire (2003-2006) (Dutch subs)
- Marathon (2004-2006)
- Martin Mystery (2004-2007)
- Marvo the Wonder Chicken (2009)
- Matt's Monsters (2009)
- The Max (2005)
- Medabots (2002-2007)
- Mega Babies (2003-2009)
- MegaMan NT Warrior (2005-06)
- Meteor and the Mighty Monster Trucks (2008-2009, Jetix Play)
- Mini Marathon (2005)
- Monster Jam Item (2006)
- Moville Mysteries (2003-2005)
- Musti (2008-2009, Jetix Play)
- Nationale Kids TV (2006-2007)
- NEW! (2008)
- Pat & Stan (Pat en Stan) (2009) (short series)
- Pecola (2005-2006)
- Peter Pan & the Pirates (2000)
- Planet Sketch (2006-2008)
- Pokémon (1999-2010)
- Princess Sissi (1999-2005)
- Rangers! (1999-2005)
- RoboRoach (2003-2005)
- Saban's Adventures of Oliver Twist (Oliver Twist) (1997-2005)
- Shaman King (2003-2005)
- Shin-chan (2003-2005)
- The Simpsons (2007) (Two episodes only, dubbed)
- Sitting Ducks (2003-2005)
- Skunk Fu! (2008-2009)
- Sneak Peak (2009)
- Sonic X (2004-2007)
- Spetter! (2006-2007)
- Strawberry Shortcake (2004-2008, Jetix Play)
- The Suite Life of Zack & Cody (2008-2010)
- Super Pig (Super Big) (2002-2004) (JETIX block)
- Symfollies (2003-2006)
- Teenage Mutant Ninja Turtles (2004-2007)
- Tiny Planets
- Total Drama Island (2008-2009)
- Totally Spies! (2002-2010)
- Tractor Tom (2005-2007; Jetix Play)
- Transformers: Animated (2009)
- Transformers: Robots in Disguise (2004) (JETIX block)
- The Triplets (2002-2006) (Jetix Play)
- Tutenstein (2002-2006)
- Tuttels (2004-2006, Jetix Play)
- Urban Vermin (2007)
- Vakantie Mix (2006)
- Vakantiebios (2008)
- VeggieTales
- Walter Melon (1999-2006)
- What's with Andy? (2005-2009)
- The Wheels on the Bus (2005-2009, Jetix Play)
- Wie van de 3 (2004-2005)
- WNF BamboeClub PiPaPanda (2008-2009, Jetix Play)
- World of Quest (2009)
- Wunschpunsch (2001-2005)
- Yo Gabba Gabba! (2008-2009)
- Yu-Gi-Oh! Duel Monsters (2005)

==== Movies/Specials ====
- Atomic Betty: The No-L 9 (Atomic Betty Special) (2007; DVD released 2008)
- The Barbie Diaries (2007)
- Bob the Builder: A Christmas to Remember (2002)
- Bob the Builder: The Knights of Can-A-Lot (2004)
- Bob the Builder: Snowed Under - The Bobblesburg Winter Games (2005)
- Bob the Builder - Project Build It: When Bob Became a Builder (2006)
- Bob the Builder - Project Build It: Built to Be Wild (2007)
- Bob the Builder - Project Build It: Scrambler to the Rescue (2008)
- Bob the Builder - Project Build It: Race to the Finish (2009)
- Disney's Stitch! The Movie (2007)
- The Flight Before Christmas (Niko en de vliegende brigade) (2010)
- High School Musical (2006)
- High School Musical 2 (2007)
- My Scene Goes Hollywood: The Movie (2007)
- Peter Pan (2010)
- Pokémon 4Ever (Pokémon 4-ever) (2008)
- The World of Strawberry Shortcake (2008)

=== Scandinavia ===
- Bad Dog
- Black Hole High
- Braceface
- Dennis the Menace
- Digimon: Digital Monsters
- Eerie, Indiana
- Franklin
- Gadget & the Gadgetinis
- Goosebumps
- Hamtaro
- Happy Ness: The Secret of the Loch
- Inspector Gadget
- Iznogoud
- Jacob Two-Two
- Jim Button
- Life with Louie
- Little Wizards
- Lizzie McGuire
- The Magic School Bus
- Martin Mystery
- Medabots
- Moville Mysteries
- NASCAR Racers
- Pokémon
- Princess Sissi
- So Little Time
- Sonic X
- Spider-Man: The Animated Series
- Sylvanian Families
- The Three Friends and Jerry
- Three Little Ghosts
- Tiny Planets
- Totally Spies!
- Tutenstein
- Ultimate Book of Spells

=== United Kingdom ===
- American Dragon: Jake Long
- Chaotic
- Di-Gata Defenders
- Dinosaur King
- Dork Hunters from Outer Space
- Funky Cops
- Grossology
- Huntik: Secrets & Seekers
- Iron Man: Armored Adventures
- Lockie Leonard
- Magi-Nation
- Naruto
- The Owl
- Phil of the Future
- Pokémon (seasons 1–11)
- Power Rangers RPM
- Shaman King
- Teleshopping
- Total Drama Island
- Totally Spies!
- Viewtiful Joe (premiered July 2, 2007)

==== Movies/Specials ====
- Au Pair
- Au Pair II
- Fantastic Four: The Mask of Doom
- Power Rangers: Green with Evil
- Power Rangers: White Thunder
- X-Men: Beyond Good and Evil

== See also ==
- List of programs broadcast by Fox Kids
- List of programs broadcast by Toon Disney
- List of programs broadcast by Disney XD
