= List of programs broadcast by Toon Disney =

This is a list of television programs that have been broadcast by Toon Disney (now Disney XD) in the United States. The channel was launched on April 18, 1998, as a spinoff of Disney Channel, and aired mostly syndicated animated programming, ranging from action to comedy.

The first program broadcast on Toon Disney was "The Sorcerer's Apprentice" segment featuring Mickey Mouse from Fantasia. It was followed by a sampling of other Mickey Mouse shorts and episodes of Timon & Pumbaa, The New Adventures of Winnie the Pooh, Goof Troop, TaleSpin, and Aladdin.

The list does not include the programs that were introduced as Jetix, a block on Toon Disney that ran from 2004 to 2009.

== Former programming ==
- ^{1} Also aired on ABC Kids from ABC.
- ^{2} Also aired on Disney's One Too from UPN.
- ^{3} Also part of Jetix block.
- ^{4} Integrated into the Disney XD initial lineup.

=== Continuations ===
Title	Premiere date	End date	First reran	Last reran	Original network	Format/Note(s)	Source(s)
Timon & Pumbaa	January 1, 1999	September 24, 1999	April 18, 1998	February 8, 2009	Syndication (The Disney Afternoon) & CBS	Season 3 episodes first ran on Toon Disney	
Pepper Ann^{1 2}	September 1, 2001	September 9, 2001	September 1, 2001	July 20, 2008	ABC (Disney's One Saturday Morning) & syndication (Disney's One Too)	Several unaired episodes from season 4 premiered on Toon Disney in syndication	
Teacher's Pet^{1}	January 11, 2002	May 10, 2002	August 25, 2001	August 19, 2006	ABC (Disney's One Saturday Morning/ABC Kids)	New episodes from season 2 premiered on Toon Disney	
Teamo Supremo^{1}	April 22, 2002	August 17, 2004	March 15, 2002	August 27. 2006	ABC (Disney's One Saturday Morning/ABC Kids)	New episodes moved to Toon Disney after the second half of season 2.	
House of Mouse^{1}	September 2, 2002	October 24, 2003	November 18, 2001	February 6, 2009	ABC (Disney's One Saturday Morning/ABC Kids)	Season 3 had its original run with Toon Disney	
Lloyd in Space^{1}	October 1, 2002	February 27, 2004	March 1, 2001	October 23, 2006	ABC (Disney's One Saturday Morning/ABC Kids)	Season 3–4 had its original run with Toon Disney	
The Weekenders^{1 2}	October 19, 2003	February 29, 2004	August 24, 2001	February 6, 2009	ABC (Disney's One Saturday Morning) & syndication (Disney's One Too)	Several episodes first aired on Toon Disney in the US from 2003-2004	
Fillmore!^{1} ^{4}	January 2, 2004	January 30, 2004	February 17, 2003	January 18, 2009	ABC (Disney's One Saturday Morning/ABC Kids)	Episodes in 2004 first aired on Toon Disney	

=== Syndicated from Disney Channel ===
Title	Premiere date	End date	Source(s)
Mickey's Mouse Tracks	April 19, 1998	September 30, 1999	
Donald's Quack Attack	April 19, 1998	January 1, 2003	
The Proud Family^{1}	September 6, 2004	February 6, 2009	
Dave the Barbarian	January 1, 2005	February 8, 2009	
Kim Possible^{1 3}	April 11, 2005	February 12, 2009	
Brandy & Mr. Whiskers	January 16, 2006	January 8, 2009	
Lilo & Stitch: The Series^{1}	January 16, 2006	February 8, 2009	
The Emperor's New School^{1} ^{4}	January 30, 2006	February 4, 2009	
American Dragon: Jake Long^{3 4}	February 20, 2006	February 12, 2009	
The Buzz on Maggie^{1}	January 5, 2007		
The Replacements^{1} ^{4}	August 20, 2007	February 12, 2009	
The Suite Life of Zack & Cody^{1} ^{4}	September 1, 2008	February 12, 2009	
Phineas and Ferb^{4}	September 1, 2008	February 12, 2009	
Cars Toons: Mater's Tall Tales^{4}	December 3, 2008	January 31, 2009	
The Suite Life on Deck^{4}	January 11, 2009		

=== Syndicated from The Disney Afternoon ===
Title	Premiere date	End date	Source(s)
Aladdin	April 18, 1998	December 14, 2008	
Goof Troop	April 18, 1998	December 21, 2008	
TaleSpin	April 18, 1998	June 28, 2008	
Adventures of the Gummi Bears	April 19, 1998	December 29, 2001	
Bonkers	April 19, 1998	November 1, 2004	
Darkwing Duck	April 19, 1998	January 19, 2007	
Chip 'n Dale: Rescue Rangers	April 19, 1998	August 3, 2008	
Shnookums & Meat	April 19, 1998	July 6, 2007	
Mighty Ducks	August 31, 1998	March 2, 2007	
Quack Pack	August 31, 1998	November 1, 2004	
Gargoyles^{3 4}	September 1, 1998	February 12, 2009	
DuckTales	September 3, 1999	February 9, 2007	

=== Syndicated from ABC & UPN (Disney's One Saturday Morning/Disney's One Too) ===
Title	Premiere date	End date	Source(s)
The New Adventures of Winnie the Pooh^{1}	April 18, 1998	October 19, 2007	
Jungle Cubs^{1}	April 20, 1998	December 31, 2001	
101 Dalmatians: The Series^{1}	September 1, 1998	May 22, 2007	
Hercules: The Animated Series^{1 2}	September 26, 2000	February 4, 2009	
Disney's Doug^{1 2}	September 1, 2001	October 30, 2004	
Recess^{1} ^{2}	August 20, 2001	February 12, 2009	
Buzz Lightyear of Star Command^{1 2 3}	June 16, 2002	August 11, 2007	
The Legend of Tarzan^{1 2 3 4}	August 31, 2003	February 6, 2009	
Schoolhouse Rock!	November 1, 2004	August 29, 2005	

=== Syndicated from CBS ===
Title	Premiere date	End date	Source(s)
The Little Mermaid	April 19, 1998	January 25, 2008	
The Wuzzles	April 19, 1998	December 31, 2001	
Raw Toonage	April 19, 1998	December 31, 2001	
Marsupilami	April 19, 1998	December 31, 2001	

=== Syndicated from DIC Entertainment ===
Title	Premiere date	End date	Original network	Source(s)
What-a-Mess	April 19, 1998	September 1, 2002	ABC	
Wild West C.O.W.-Boys of Moo Mesa	April 19, 1998	March 31, 2001	ABC	
Bump in the Night	April 19, 1998	March 31, 2001	ABC	
Madeline	April 19, 1998	November 16, 2003	The Family Channel; ABC	
Gadget Boy	April 19, 1998	January 1, 2002	Syndication (Amazin' Adventures)	
Wish Kid	April 19, 1998	September 1, 2002	NBC	
The New Archies	April 19, 1998	September 1, 2002	NBC	
The Wizard of Oz	April 19, 1998	September 1, 2002	ABC	
Super Dave	April 19, 1998	September 1, 2002	Fox (Fox Kids)	
The Littles	April 20, 1998	September 1, 2002	ABC	
Adventures of Sonic the Hedgehog	August 31, 1998	August 30, 2002	Syndication	
Mary-Kate and Ashley in Action!^{1}	September 1, 2002	February 28, 2004	ABC (Disney's One Saturday Morning/ABC Kids)	
Sabrina: The Animated Series^{1 2}	September 1, 2002	August 29, 2004	ABC (Disney's One Saturday Morning/ABC Kids); UPN (Disney's One Too)	
Sabrina's Secret Life	September 11, 2004	February 27, 2005	Syndication (DIC Kids Network)	

=== Other programming ===
Title	Premiere date	End date	Original network	Source(s)
Care Bears	August 31, 1998	August 31, 2002	ABC	
Blazing Dragons	August 31, 1998	August 30, 2002	Teletoon	
Hello Kitty and Friends	August 31, 1998	June 30, 2002	YTV	
Toad Patrol	September 1, 2002	September 6, 2004	Teletoon	
Rupert	September 4, 2001	August 30, 2002	YTV; Nickelodeon	
Ultimate Book of Spells	September 3, 2002	August 30, 2003	YTV	
Garfield and Friends	September 2, 2003	January 30, 2006	CBS	
What's with Andy?	January 18, 2005	June 2, 2005	Teletoon; Fox Family	
All Dogs Go to Heaven: The Series	September 2, 2006	October 16, 2006	Broadcast syndication Fox Family Channel	
Minuscule	August 26, 2007	February 10, 2009	France 2 France 5	
The Owl	October 29, 2007	January 15, 2009	France 3	
Shaun the Sheep	November 23, 2007	February 1, 2009	CBBC; Disney Channel	

=== Short programming ===
Title	Premiere date	End date	Original network	Source(s)
Toon Disney Doodles	September 1, 1998	September 30, 1999	Toon Disney	

== Purposed programming ==
=== Syndicated from ABC & UPN (Disney's One Saturday Morning/Disney's One Too) ===
Title	Planned premiere date	Source(s)
Mickey Mouse Works^{1}	2003	

== Interstitial programming ==
- Story Time (premiered April 19, 1998)
- Mike's Super Short Show
- Disney’s Really Short Report
- Great Minds Think 4 Themselves
- Gadgetoonery
- Toon Tunes
- The Mix-Ups
- Disney's Magic Drawing
- Squash and Stretch
- Toonology
- Find Out Why?

== Programming blocks ==
- Magical World of Toons (1998–2003)
- Toons in the House (2000–2001)
- Princess Power Hour (2000–2007)
- @Toon (2001–2004)
- Hangin' with the Heroes (2002–2004)
- Movie Madness (2003–2004)
- Jetix (2004–2009)
  - Mega Jam (2007)
  - Mega Movie Jam (2007)
- Toon Treats (1998–1999)
- Toon Disney Treasure Cove (2007–2008)
- 2oon Disney (2001–2004)
- Friday Night Movie (1998–2001)
- Double Feature Movie Night (2001–2005)
- Big Movie Show (2004–2009)
  - Big Movie Weekend (2007–2009)

== Events ==
- Scary Saturdays (2001–2005)
  - Scary Toon Afternoon (2001)
  - Sunday Monster Mania (2001)
  - Monster of the Month (2001)
  - Monster Mania Marathon (2001)
- Jingle Toons (1998–2001)
- Month of Merriment (2001–2005)
- 12 Days of Christmas (2006–2008)
- Play Again Jam-It (2006–2007)
- Summer Movie Splash (2005)
  - Summer Movie Splash 2 (2005)
- November/December/January Movies (2004–2005)
- Splish Splash Movie Bash (2006)
- Summer 1000 Prizes (2007–2008)
- Wild Wild Quest Movies Week
  - Wild Wild Quest Movies Week 2
  - Wild Wild Quest Movies Week 3

== See also ==
- List of programs broadcast by Jetix
- List of programs broadcast by Jetix (block)
- List of programs broadcast by Disney XD
