= Princess Sissi =

1997 children's animated television series

- "Princess Sissi" title screen
- Also known as: Saban's Sissi the Princess
- Genre: Adventure; Drama; Historical; Romance
- Created by: Bruno Bianchi
- Directed by: Bruno Bianchi; Richard Pare
- Voices of: Terri Hawkes; Terrence Scammell; Jacob Tierney; Rick Jones; Michael Caloz; Sonja Ball; Mark Camacho
- Opening theme: "Nobody Else", performed by Sonja Ball
- Ending theme: "Let Me Be Myself and Stay", performed by Sonja Ball
- Composers: Haim Saban; Shuki Levy; (as Michel Dax); Udi Harpaz
- Countries of origin: France; Canada
- Original language: English (Note: Although primarily written in France, the series is an English-language production as evidenced by the US and Italian involvement, the consistent use of English as original language by both Saban International Paris and CinéGroupe, and the French-language theme song ending on a different note compared to the background music, in both the France version by Douchka Esposito and the Quebec variant by Marie-Ève Janvier.)
- No. of seasons: 2
- No. of episodes: 52

Production
- Executive producer: Vincent Chalvon-Demersay
- Running time: 30 minutes
- Production companies: Saban International Paris; Animation Ciné-Groupe J.P. Inc. ARD Degeto; RAI Radiotelevisione Italiana

Original release
- Network: Fox Kids (International); RAI (Italy); France 3 (France); Das Erste (Germany)
- Release: October 29, 1997 – 1998

Princess Sissi (French: Princesse Sissi, Italian: La Principessa Sissi, also known as Saban's Sissi the Princess) is a children's animated series. It debuted on October 29, 1997 on France 3 and within the same time in Italy on Rai 1, and later premiered in Canada on Radio-Canada on September 5, 1998. A co-production between Saban International Paris, Animation Ciné-Groupe J.P. Inc., ARD Degeto, France 3 and RAI Radiotelevisione Italiana, the series is loosely based on the life of the Austrian Empress Elisabeth, nicknamed "Sissi".

== Story ==
A unique Bavarian girl, Sissi, has her life changed after the day she meets the noble princes, Franz and Karl. It doesn't take long until Sissi and Franz fall in love and start to make plans for a future together, however, they face obstacles before they can marry. Sissi and Franz must face jealousy, deceit, treason, and danger between the fronts of Austria and Hungary.

== Episode ==
=== Season 1 ===
No.	Title	Written by	Original release date
1	"Sissi Gets Her Way"	Catherine Guillot-Bonté; Dab Sivalon (story)	October 29, 1997
Sissi and her family make preparations to welcome Duke Max home, when Sissi finds her twin brothers are missing. She finds them up a mountain searching for something special to give to their father upon his return. The duke returns with presents for the family, including a puppy Sissi calls Shadow. After Duke Max aids in a village fire, the evil Count Arkas wrongfully arrests the estate agent Broner.
2	"The Unexpected Guests"	Claude Scasso; Natalie Altmann (story)	TBA
3	"An Imperial Surprise"	Jean-Pierre Liccioni; Dab Sivalon (story)	TBA
4	"Possi's Little Thief"	Marie-Odile Hanns; Natalie Altmann (story)	TBA
5	"Helena the Terrible"	Jean-Pierre Liccioni; Dab Sivalon (story)	TBA
6	"Time to Say Goodbye"	Annabelle Perrichon; Natalie Altmann (story)	TBA
7	"Taking Changes"	Jean-Pierre Liccioni; Dab Sivalon (story)	TBA
8	"An Unusual Woodsman"	Annabelle Perrichon; Natalie Altmann (story)	TBA
9	"Arkas Gets His Revenge"	François Gaschet; Dab Sivalon (story)	TBA
10	"The Innsbruck Kiss"	Marine Locatelli; Natalie Altmann (story)	TBA
11	"The Parents Refuse"	Danielle Aubry; Dab Sivalon (story)	TBA
12	"A letter from Franz"	Joël Bassaget; Natalie Altmann (story)	TBA
13	"The Engagement Ball"	–	TBA
14	"Missed Reunions"	Dab Sivalon	TBA
15	"First Steps in the Royal Court"	François Gaschet	TBA
16	"A Gilded Cage"	Annabelle Perrichon	TBA
17	"The Zaniouchka Circus"	Claude Scasso	TBA
18	"The Mirror's Secret"	Danielle Aubry	TBA
19	"An Eventful Christmas"	Danielle Aubry	TBA
20	"The Fortress"	Elma Chaphor	TBA
21	"Running Against Time"	Elma Chaphor	TBA
22	"Lover's Tif"	Claude Scasso	TBA
23	"They've Stolen Tempest"	Normand Mongeon; Philippe Couillon (story)	TBA
24	"A Well-Deserved Victory"	Normand Mongeon; Philippe Couillon	TBA
25	"Danger at the Prater"	Jean-Pierre Lucioni; Philippe Couillon (story)	TBA
26	"Sissi and Franz Keep Their Promises"	Annabelle Perrichon	TBA

=== Season 2 ===
No.	Title	Written by	Original release date
1	"The Tiara is Gone"	Danielle Aubry; Claude Scasso (story)	TBA
2	"The Opera Caper"	François Gaschet	TBA
3	"Sissi's Sacrifice"	Claude Scasso	TBA
4	"Hooray Erzsebet!"	Dab Sivalon; Claude Scasso	TBA
5	"Jealousy"	Annabelle Perrichon	TBA
6	"Goodbye Budapest"	Annabelle Perrichon	TBA
7	"Possi Must Be Saved"	François Gaschet	TBA
8	"Sissi and the Apaches"	Claude Scasso	TBA
9	"Hard Times"	Danielle Aubry	TBA
10	"The Mysterious Horsewoman"	Jean-Pierre Liccioni; Philippe Couillion (story)	TBA
11	"Hide and Seek at Schonbrunn"	Elma Chaphor	TBA
12	"The Great Chase"	François Gaschet	TBA
13	"Confessions in Venice"	Claude Scasso	TBA
14	"Ahriman Island"	Annabelle Perrichon	TBA
15	"The Shipwreck"	Danielle Aubry; Philippe Perrot (story)	TBA
16	"Arkas' Prisoners"	Danielle Aubry	TBA
17	"Private Sissi"	François Gaschet	TBA
18	"Sissi in the Eye of the Storm"	Claude Scasso	TBA
19	"The Three Pigeons"	Jean-Pierre Liccioni; Philippe Perrot (story)	TBA
20	"Be Careful, Princess"	Claude Scasso; Dab Sivalon	TBA
21	"Tommy's Mystery"	Annabelle Perichon	TBA
22	"Arkas Never Gives Up"	François Gaschet	TBA
23	"Dr. Fritz's Elixer"	Danielle Aubry; Claude Scasso (story)	TBA
24	"Prince Fritz"	Dab Sivalon; Claude Scasso (story)	TBA
25	"The Double-Crossed Game"	Claude Scasso; Dab Sivalon (story)	TBA
26	"The Triumph of Love"	Claude Scasso; Dab Sivalon	TBA

== Production ==
Officially a France-Canada co-production (as stated in the closing credits), the writing for the series was primarily done in France, while producers from the United States and Italy also had input on the scripts. Having writing discussions among representatives of four countries often resulted in differing opinions, sometimes directly opposing one another. According to episode writer Claude Scasso:

The episodes would have logically been written half in France and half in Canada but the fact is all the story and developments of the arches were made in France. And I was led to rewrite several times Canadian scenarios that were not up to the standard without getting credit for it.

Obviously, their authors were working too far away from our energy that was in perpetual motion; ideas did not circulate well.

The texts were reread and discussed not only in France and Canada but also by the Italian co-producers and the U.S. broadcaster. This often led to lots of contradictory remarks: the French commented more on the structure ... The Italians wanted romance to always be present, the Canadians were not involved much and the Americans were obsessed with anything that might offend the young audience ...

I remember one of my episodes that the Italians had found too violent and the Americans too romantic. I gathered that I didn't have to change anything, it was perfect.

While the story features many genuine historical figures, their roles were often changed and numerous plot points were invented for the series when the real story was found to be lacking adventure. Major events such as Sissi's trip to Paris, her father's exile, and even an imminent Austro-Hungarian war were added largely for this purpose. Scasso notes that the latter addition proved particularly fascinating and exciting to the American producers.

== Release ==
=== Broadcast ===
The series aired on Fox Kids stations in Latin America and Europe. The series also rebroadcast on Jetix Play in the regions it broadcast in. The series was aired in the Philippines on GMA Network in 2000.

The series briefly aired in the United States on girlzChannel, and in Canada on Teletoon.

=== Home media ===
==== VHS ====
In France between 1997 and 1999, PolyGram Video (and later Universal Pictures Video) released five VHS volumes of the series, containing three episodes each.

In the United Kingdom, two volumes containing two episodes each, titled "Sissi in Possenhofen" and "Imperial Guests" were released on January 14, 2000 by 20th Century Fox Home Entertainment.

==== DVD ====
As with many other Saban Entertainment series, the only major English-language DVD release is by Czech distributor North Video, featuring both Czech and English audio and original video (with English-language text) in the original production order. All 52 episodes were released on 16 volumes, from June 4 to December 18, 2010.

== See also ==
- Sissi: La Giovane Imperatrice, an Italian-animated adaptation produced in 2017 by Mondo TV which did 2 seasons (56 episodes) in 2D and is scheduled to release a 3rd season (52 episodes) in 3D.
