= Toon Disney =

Former American children's television channel

- Final logo, used from 2005 to 2009
- Country: United States
- Headquarters: Burbank, California, U.S.

Programming
- Languages: English and Spanish (via SAP audio track), in the United States
- Picture format: 720p (HDTV); 480i (SDTV)

Ownership
- Owner: Disney Channels Worldwide (Disney-ABC Television Group)
- Sister channels: Disney Channel; Playhouse Disney

History
- Launched: April 18, 1998; 28 years ago
- Closed: February 13, 2009; 17 years ago (in the United States)
- Replaced by: Disney XD (United States; Japan, and India) Disney Cinemagic (Europe)

Toon Disney was an American multinational pay television channel owned by Disney Branded Television, a subsidiary of Disney-ABC Television Group. The channel's target audience was children aged 2–11, and older children and adolescents aged 8–15 during the Jetix programming block.

A spin-off of Disney Channel, the channel's programming mostly included animated series, shorts, and features from Disney, as well as acquired programs.

== History ==
Toon Disney was launched on April 18, 1998, at 3:00 p.m. Eastern Time, in honor of Disney Channel's 15th anniversary by Disney Channel, Inc. on digital tiers of DirecTV, Marcus Cable, and EchoStar. The first program to air on the network was The Sorcerer's Apprentice from Fantasia (1940). At 7:00 p.m. ET that day, Toon Disney launched a block called "The Magical World of Toons". The block originally featured Disney animated features, specials, and shorts. Over the next five months, Toon Disney furthered its programming to cable subscribers such as Americast. At its launch, the channel shared half of its assigned series with Disney Channel. The channel had no advertising until its viewership reached a set number. On January 31, 1999, the channel aired the "Pumbaa Bowl" marathon as counterprogramming against Super Bowl XXXIII.

By September 2000, the channel was expected to reach 20 million subscribers and would start showing advertising. Ad sales were provided by Disney Kids Network.

In June 2001, Toon Disney launched the "Most Animated Kid Search". In September 2002, eight new shows joined the line-up as part of Toon Disney's fall schedule. In commemoration of the network's fifth anniversary in April 2003, the channel held the "Toon Disney's Magical Adventure Sweepstakes" in which three winners along with three family members would win a trip to Disneyland Resort to see Disney's Aladdin: A Musical Spectacular.

On February 14, 2004, the Jetix programming block began on Toon Disney and ABC Family as a part of the Jetix programming alliance of ABC Networks Group, Fox Kids Europe, and Fox Kids Latin America. The block consisted of the entire acquired Fox Kids/Saban Entertainment action library as the result of an acquisition by The Walt Disney Company in the summer of 2001, as well as some original programming. Some shows, including The Legend of Tarzan, and Buzz Lightyear of Star Command aired under both the Toon Disney and Jetix monikers.

The Toon Disney/Big Movie Show premiere of the 2004 film The Polar Express on December 22, 2006, was the channel's highest primetime rating with 1.35 million viewers. On January 27, 2007, Toon Disney launched its weekend afternoon programming block, "The Great Toon Weekend".

On August 6, 2008, Disney-ABC Television Group announced they would rebrand Toon Disney in early 2009 as Disney XD, which would be aimed at children, mostly boys, from ages 6 and up. The final pre-Disney XD program to air on the channel was The Incredible Hulk episode "Doomed" at 11:30 p.m. ET on February 12, 2009, as part of Jetix, while the first Disney XD program was the Phineas and Ferb episode "Dude, We're Getting the Band Back Together" on February 13, 2009, at 12:00 midnight ET.

== Programming ==
=== Blocks ===
- Toon Disney's Big Movie Show was an evening movie block that started in 2004 and lasted until 2009.
- Double Feature Friday was a block that featured two different movies back-to-back every Friday night. The block started in 2001, and lasted until 2004.
- Jetix was a block using programming from the Saban/Marvel library held by ABC Family Worldwide and additional original programming launched on February 14, 2004, with the block originally having 12 hours of weekly prime-time programming to start. By the time of Toon Disney's closure in February 2009, Jetix had taken up more than half of the network's programming schedule, airing for 12 hours on weekdays and 19 hours on weekends.
- The Magical World of Toons was Toon Disney's prime time block which was launched on April 18, 1998, and lasted until April 6, 2003. During the week, the block would showcase shorts and series featuring Disney characters such as Mickey Mouse, Donald Duck, Timon & Pumbaa, Hercules, Aladdin, Doug, and Pepper Ann. During the weekend, the block would present animated features, most of those created for the home video market, including The Return of Jafar and The Brave Little Toaster Goes to Mars, as well as some theatrical releases including A Goofy Movie, Alice in Wonderland, and The Brave Little Toaster.
- Princess Power Hour was a block featuring Disney Princesses Jasmine and Ariel through episodes of Aladdin and The Little Mermaid. (2000–2007)
- Chillin' With the Villains was a block that aired on Sundays. The block consists of a series of mini-marathon with a notable villain. (2000–2004)
- The Great Toon Weekend (GTW) was a weekend afternoon programming block that aired every Saturday and Sunday starting at noon for 7 hours beginning on January 27, 2007. The Great Toon Weekend started with a two-hour movie under the banner of "Big Movie Show" followed by five hours of back-to-back episodes of the following shows: Aladdin, Timon & Pumbaa, Buzz Lightyear of Star Command, The Emperor's New School and Lilo & Stitch.
- Hangin' with the Heroes was a weekend block consisting of two hours of Aladdin, Gargoyles, and Hercules. Later, the block began airing every weeknight starting at 11:00 pm. It lasted from January 2002 to 2004.

== International versions ==
In the fall of 2000, Disney launched its first overseas Toon Disney channel in the United Kingdom. The UK channel was later replaced by Disney Cinemagic in March 2006. In 2004, four new markets added a Toon Disney channel with three in Europe with Germany also adding a time shift channel. In December, Walt Disney Television International India launched a Toon Disney channel with three language audio tracks (English, Hindi, Tamil, and Telugu). In 2005, a Toon Disney channel was launched for the Nordic countries, and another one for Japan. A Hindi-language audio track was introduced on Toon Disney in India on September 1, 2005. After the shutdown of the US channel, the remaining channels and blocks with the Toon Disney name outside the US were relaunched as either Disney Cinemagic (in European countries only), Disney Channel, or Disney XD, with the last Toon Disney-branded channels to close being the two Italian channels on October 1, 2011.

Market	Type	Launch date	Language	Replaced by	Replaced by date
United States	Channel	April 18, 1998	English, Spanish	Disney XD	February 13, 2009
Japan	Channel	December 1, 2005	Japanese	Disney XD	August 9, 2009
United Kingdom and Ireland	Channel	September 29, 2000	English	Disney Cinemagic	March 16, 2006
India	Channel	December 17, 2004	English, Hindi, Tamil, Telugu	Disney XD	November 12, 2009
Vietnam	Block on HTV7	February 2007	English, Vietnamese, German, Italian, Norwegian, Swedish, Finnish, Danish, Icelandic, Estonian, Latvian, Lithuanian, Russian		
France	Channel	November 2, 2002	English, Vietnamese, German, Italian, Norwegian, Swedish, Finnish, Danish, Icelandic, Estonian, Latvian, Lithuanian, Russian	Disney Cinemagic	September 4, 2007
Germany	Channel	November 10, 2004	English, Vietnamese, German, Italian, Norwegian, Swedish, Finnish, Danish, Icelandic, Estonian, Latvian, Lithuanian, Russian	Disney Cinemagic	July 4, 2009
Germany	+1 timeshift service		English, Vietnamese, German, Italian, Norwegian, Swedish, Finnish, Danish, Icelandic, Estonian, Latvian, Lithuanian, Russian	Disney XD +1	April 18, 2010
Italy	Channel	December 24, 2004	English, Vietnamese, German, Italian, Norwegian, Swedish, Finnish, Danish, Icelandic, Estonian, Latvian, Lithuanian, Russian	Disney Channel +2	October 1, 2011
Italy	+1 timeshift service	December 20, 2008	English, Vietnamese, German, Italian, Norwegian, Swedish, Finnish, Danish, Icelandic, Estonian, Latvian, Lithuanian, Russian	Disney XD +2	October 1, 2011
Scandinavia	Channel	August 1, 2005	English, Vietnamese, German, Italian, Norwegian, Swedish, Finnish, Danish, Icelandic, Estonian, Latvian, Lithuanian, Russian	Disney XD	September 12, 2009
Spain	Channel	November 16, 2001	Spanish	Disney Cinemagic	June 30, 2008

== See also ==
- List of programs broadcast by Disney Channel
- List of programs broadcast by Disney Jr. (block)
- List of programs broadcast by Disney XD
- List of programs broadcast by Fox Kids (block)
- List of programs broadcast by Jetix (block)
