= List of programs broadcast by Jetix (block) =

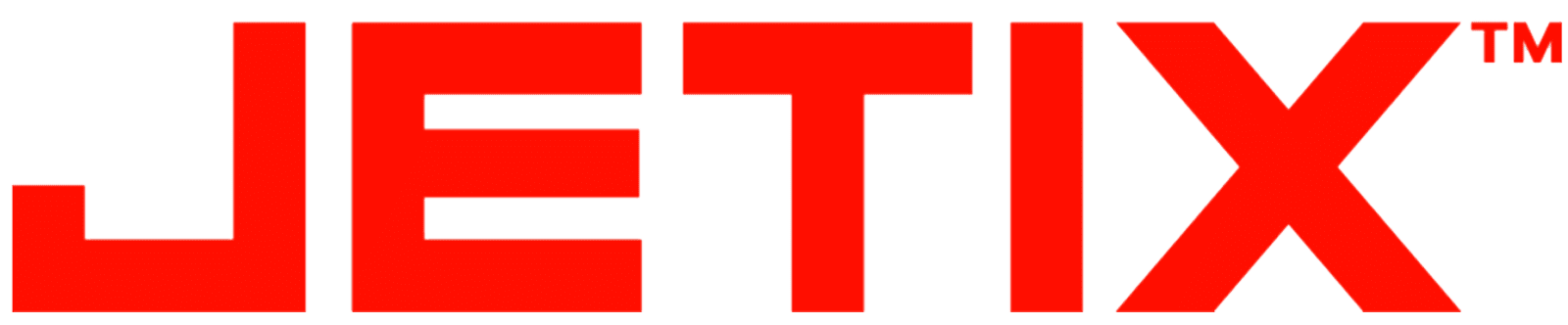

This is a list of television programs broadcast on the Jetix blocks on Toon Disney and ABC Family.

== Former programming ==
- ^{1} Also aired on ABC Kids from ABC.
- ^{2} Previously aired under ABC Family's Action Block.
- ^{3} Also part of Toon Disney's main schedule.
- ^{4} Integrated into the Disney XD initial lineup.

=== Original programming ===
Title	Premiere date	End date	Source(s)
Power Rangers (Note: An umbrella name for Power Rangers Dino Thunder, Ninja Storm, Generations, S.P.D., Mystic Force, Operation Overdrive, and Jungle Fury.)^{1 2}	February 14, 2004	January 28, 2009	(Note: ABC Family run aired from February 14, 2004 to August 27, 2006. Toon Disney run aired from February 14, 2004 to January 28, 2009.) (Note: Dino Thunder aired from February 14, 2004 to November 20, 2004 (ABC Family) & January 16, 2009 (Toon Disney), Ninja Storm aired from February 16, 2004 to January 28, 2009 (Toon Disney), Generations aired from January 18, 2005 to September 29, 2007 (Toon Disney), S.P.D. aired from February 5, 2005 to August 27, 2006 (ABC Family) & January 16, 2009 (Toon Disney), Mystic Force aired from February 20, 2006 to August 27, 2006 (ABC Family) & January 20, 2009 (Toon Disney), Operation Overdrive aired from February 26, 2007 to January 26, 2009 (Toon Disney), and Jungle Fury aired from February 18, 2008 to November 3, 2008 (Toon Disney).)
Digimon (Note: An umbrella name for Digimon Adventure, Adventure 02, Tamers, and Frontier.)^{2 4}	February 14, 2004	February 12, 2009	(Note: ABC Family run aired from February 14, 2004 to August 20, 2006. Toon Disney run aired from February 14, 2004 to January 28, 2009.) (Note: Digimon: Digital Monsters aired from February 14, 2004 to August 31, 2008, and Data Squad aired from October 1, 2007 to February 12, 2009.)
Super Robot Monkey Team Hyperforce Go!^{4}	September 18, 2004	February 12, 2009	(Note: ABC Family run aired from September 18, 2004 to August 27, 2006. Toon Disney run aired from September 20, 2004 to February 12, 2009.)
Dragon Booster	October 23, 2004	September 30, 2007	(Note: ABC Family run aired from October 23, 2004 to August 20, 2006. Toon Disney run aired from October 23, 2004 to September 30, 2007.)
W.I.T.C.H.^{1}	December 19, 2004	August 31, 2008	(Note: ABC Family run aired from December 19, 2004 to August 27, 2006. Toon Disney run aired from December 19, 2004 to August 31, 2008.)
Battle B-Daman	April 17, 2005	September 29, 2007	(Note: ABC Family run aired from April 2, 2005 to November 12, 2005. Toon Disney run aired from April 17, 2005 to September 29, 2007.)
Get Ed^{4}	September 19, 2005	February 11, 2009	(Note: Toon Disney run aired from September 19, 2005 to February 11, 2009. ABC Family run aired from September 24, 2005 to August 27, 2006.)
A.T.O.M.^{4}	January 30, 2006	February 8, 2009	(Note: Toon Disney run aired from January 30, 2006 to February 8, 2009. ABC Family run aired from February 4, 2006 to August 27, 2006.)
Ōban Star-Racers^{4}	June 3, 2006	February 11, 2009	(Note: ABC Family run aired from June 3, 2006 to August 27, 2006. Toon Disney run aired from June 3, 2006 to February 11, 2009.)
Yin Yang Yo!^{4}	August 26, 2006	February 12, 2009	(Note: Toon Disney run aired from August 26, 2006 to February 12, 2009. ABC Family run aired on August 27, 2006.)
Pucca^{4}	September 18, 2006	February 11, 2009	
Monster Buster Club^{4}	June 2, 2008	February 11, 2009	

=== Syndicated from Disney Channel ===
Title	Premiere date	End date	Source(s)
Kim Possible^{1 3}	September 1, 2007	April 2, 2008	
American Dragon: Jake Long ^{3 4}	September 1, 2007	November 9, 2007	
Phineas and Ferb^{3 4}	October 25, 2008	February 11, 2009	

=== Syndicated from The Disney Afternoon ===
Title	Premiere date	End date	Note
Gargoyles^{1 3 4}	March 13, 2004	February 11, 2009	(Note: ABC Family run aired from March 13, 2004 to September 4, 2004. Toon Disney run aired from November 1, 2004 to February 11, 2009.)

=== Syndicated from ABC & UPN (Disney's One Saturday Morning/Disney's One Too) ===
Title	Premiere date	End date
The Legend of Tarzan^{1 3 4}	February 14, 2004	February 6, 2009
Buzz Lightyear of Star Command^{1 3}	February 16, 2004	August 11, 2007

=== Syndicated from BVS Entertainment/ABC Family Worldwide ===
Title	Premiere date	End date	Original network	Source(s)
Spider-Man: The Animated Series^{2 4}	June 26, 2004	February 10, 2009	Fox (Fox Kids)	(Note: Toon Disney run aired from June 26, 2004 to February 10, 2009. ABC Family run aired from June 27, 2004 to July 3, 2004.)
Spider-Man Unlimited^{2 4}	July 3, 2004	February 9, 2009	Fox (Fox Kids)	
X-Men: The Animated Series^{2 4}	July 18, 2004	February 11, 2009	Fox (Fox Kids)	(Note: ABC Family run aired from July 18, 2004 to January 15, 2006. Toon Disney run aired from July 18, 2004 to February 11, 2009.)
Spider-Man and His Amazing Friends^{2 4}	November 6, 2004	February 11, 2009	NBC	(Note: ABC Family run aired from November 6, 2004 to May 31, 2006. Toon Disney run aired from November 6, 2004 to February 11, 2009.)
Shinzo^{2}	January 17, 2005	February 11, 2009	ANN (TV Asahi)	(Note: ABC Family run aired from January 17, 2005 to June 29, 2005. Toon Disney run aired from January 17, 2005 to February 11, 2009.)
The Tick	June 19, 2005	March 31, 2008	Fox (Fox Kids)	(Note: ABC Family run aired from June 19, 2005 to November 5, 2005. Toon Disney run aired from June 24, 2005 to March 31, 2008.)
The Incredible Hulk^{2 4}	June 21, 2005	February 12, 2009	UPN (UPN Kids)	(Note: ABC Family run aired from June 21, 2005 to July 26, 2005. Toon Disney run aired from June 6, 2008 to February 12, 2009.)
Dungeons & Dragons	April 8, 2006	January 27, 2008	CBS	
NASCAR Racers^{2}	June 10, 2006	August 31, 2008	Fox (Fox Kids)	(Note: ABC Family run aired from June 10, 2006 to August 27, 2006. Toon Disney run aired from June 10, 2006 to August 31, 2008.)
Bureau of Alien Detectors	September 10, 2006	January 14, 2007	UPN (UPN Kids)	
Mon Colle Knights	September 10, 2006	January 14, 2007	Fox (Fox Kids)	
Xyber 9: New Dawn	January 20, 2007	August 3, 2008	Fox (Fox Kids)	
Iron Man^{2 4}	May 4, 2008	February 11, 2009	Syndication (The Marvel Action Hour/Marvel Action Universe)	
Fantastic Four^{2 4}	June 27, 2008	February 12, 2009	Syndication (The Marvel Action Hour/Marvel Action Universe)	
The Avengers: United They Stand^{4}	September 1, 2008	February 12, 2009	Fox (Fox Kids)	

=== Other programming ===
Title	Premiere date	End date	Original network	Source(s)
Beyblade^{2}	February 14, 2004	January 14, 2007	TXN (TV Tokyo); YTV	(Note: ABC Family run aired from February 14, 2004 to July 30, 2005. Toon Disney run aired from February 14, 2004 to January 14, 2007.)
Medabots^{2}	November 7, 2004	November 27, 2004	TXN (TV Tokyo); YTV; Fox (Fox Kids)	(Note: ABC Family and Toon Disney runs aired from November 7, 2004 to November 27, 2004.)
Kong: The Animated Series	September 19, 2005	January 27, 2008	M6; Fox (Fox Kids)	(Note: Toon Disney run aired from September 19, 2005 to January 27, 2008. ABC Family run aired from September 24, 2005 to August 31, 2006.)
Daigunder^{2}	June 10, 2006	January 14, 2007	TXN (TV Tokyo)	
Silverwing	July 1, 2006	January 27, 2008	Teletoon	
Legend of the Dragon	August 14, 2006	August 31, 2008	CBBC	
Jackie Chan Adventures^{4}	September 5, 2006	February 11, 2009	The WB (Kids' WB)	
The Mummy: The Animated Series	October 3, 2006	October 30, 2007	The WB (Kids' WB)	
Superman: The Animated Series^{4}	September 28, 2007	February 8, 2009	The WB (Kids' WB)	
Batman: The Animated Series (including The New Batman Adventures)^{4}	September 30, 2007	February 3, 2009	Fox (Fox Kids) (Batman: The Animated Series); The WB (Kids' WB) (The New Batman Adventures)	
Pinky and the Brain^{4}	October 1, 2007	August 31, 2008	The WB (Kids' WB)	
Chaotic^{4}	October 1, 2007	February 12, 2009	Fox (4Kids TV)	
Captain Flamingo	January 28, 2008	February 11, 2009	YTV	

== See also ==
- List of programs broadcast by ABC Family
- List of programs broadcast by Toon Disney
- List of programs broadcast by Disney XD
