= The Owl & Co =

- Genre: Comedy; Adventure
- Created by: Alexandre So; Josselin Charier; Antoine Rodelet
- Directed by: Victor Moulin; Jérôme Houlier (season 2); Alexandre Wahl (season 2)
- Voices of: Emmanuel Curtil; Pierre-Alain de Garrigues; Sébastien Desjours; Nathalie Homs
- Theme music composer: Les Frères Sonor
- Opening theme: "The Owl & Co"
- Composer: Les Frères Sonor
- Country of origin: France
- Original language: French
- No. of seasons: 2
- No. of episodes: 156 (list of episodes)

Production
- Executive producers: Antoine Rodelet; Josselin Charier
- Producers: Josselin Charier; Antoine Rodelet
- Running time: 7 minutes
- Production company: Studio Hari

Original release
- Network: France 3 Boomerang
- Release: March 25, 2013 – November 6, 2016

Related
- The Owl

The Owl & Co (French: La Chouette et Cie) is a French CG children's television series produced by Studio Hari for France Télévisions, based on The Owl shorts.

== Plot ==
The series features the titular absurd pink grumpy owl character who resembles a plastic figurine, levitating on its legs, the Owl is probably the unluckiest being in the world.

The forest she lives in is populated by animals, some more eccentric than others, all of whom cause a lot of trouble. Among them the most notable ones being an intelligent stuttering and tinkering stickbug, a brash, scenariosa pretentious and bossy frog, who wants to control everything, a charismatic, idealistic & exuberant bat and an airheaded , kind but super clingy and dim-witted sheep who wants to put his wacky genius at the service of the community. Like the original short series, the Owl does not care about anyone else around her, as she would rather eat a caterpillar instead. However, the Owl usually is unlucky and goes through some slapstick scenarios. A running gag at the end of each episode is the fact that the Owl ends up comically dismembered, usually accompanied by a short banjo tune.

The Owl's grumpy, solitary, and quick-tempered personality frequently contrasts with the behavior of the other forest inhabitants, whose activities often disrupt her preference for peace and quiet.

== Production ==
Development for the expansion of Studio Hari's short-form series The Owl have been announced at the start of June 2012, when Studio Hari had announced a long-form expanded sequel series based on its short-form TV series The Owl, entitled The Owl & Co known as La Chouette & Cie in French. To aculuminate with the series Studio Hari had increased & expanded its production activities to Angoulême by establishing its in-house animation production studio based in Angoulême to handle animation production services of its programming in-house with The Owl & Co becoming the first Studio Hari production to be animated at its newly founded in-house animation production facility in Angoulême, while Hari's main Paris-based studio kept writing, pre-production, and overall management in its original Paris studio and production of The Owl & Co started three months later in September that year.

Four months later in October of that year during the annual MIPJunior event, Studio Hari had signed a international distribution partnership with DreamWorks Animation's British/American entertainment & IP licensing subsidiary DreamWorks Classics to handle worldwide distribution to the series outside of France & French-speaking territories, this marked the final Studio Hari production to be distributed by an outside studio as Studio Hari would later then established its very own dedicated in-house international distribution division to take control of Studio Hari's future programming, named Hari International three years later in May 2016, beginning with the massive global hit Grizzy & the Lemmings as Studio Hari would later distribute and handle its future programming via it's newly launched in-house distribution arm Hari International.

In February 2015 when The Owl & Co was renewed for a second season, France Televisions' in-house international distribution sales arm France Télévisions Distribution had assumed worldwide distribution to the series from Classic Media, and had sold the pay-TV rights of the series The Owl & Co to Turner Broadcasting System Europe for the group's children's pay-TV networks Cartoon Network and Boomerang in the EMEA region.

== Broadcast ==
The Owl & Co made its French debut on France 3 in 2013. The series made its English debut on Boomerang UK on 2 May 2015. The English dub ended on 5 November 2016.

The series' English dub also aired internationally for some amount of time, one of them being Disney Channel Asia. It also launched in India on Sony YAY! on September 19, 2022, with a different name i.e. Dhakki Chiki Aaool!.

== Awards and nominations ==
- Pulcinella Award 2015 - Best Kids TV series - Cartoons on the bay, Venise.
