= Let's Go Quintuplets! =

Japanese anime television series

- ゴーゴー五つ子ら・ん・ど
- Directed by: Setsuko Shibuichi (chief)
- Music by: Taku Iwasaki
- Country of origin: Japan
- Original language: Japanese
- No. of episodes: 50

Production
- Producers: Tatsuo Ono (Eiken); Andrew Tamon Niwa (TBS)
- Animator: Magic Bus
- Production companies: Eiken; TBS

Original release
- Network: TBS, CBC
- Release: April 14, 2001 – March 30, 2002

Let's Go Quintuplets! (Japanese: ゴーゴー五つ子ら・ん・ど, Hepburn: Go go itsutsugo ra·n·do) is a Japanese anime series produced by Eiken and TBS that originally aired in Japan every Saturday from 7:00 AM to 7:30 AM from April 14, 2001, to March 30, 2002, on TBS. The series is about quintuplets who have many adventures together.

The series has been dubbed into English by The Ocean Group and aired in New Zealand. The first two episodes of the English dub were released on a dual audio European Spanish DVD.

The series totals 50 episodes, each one consisting of 1 to 2 parts.

The name Go! Go! Itsutsugo has a double meaning. Go is, apart from the English word, also Japanese for "five". Itsutsugo means quintuplet.

== Characters ==
The names of the characters were changed in the English dub but the initials of each name were preserved.

- Karl Miller (森野かぶと, Morino Kabuto) is the oldest of the five quintuplets, although only by a few minutes.
- Krystal Miller (森野きのこ, Morino Kinoko) is the second-oldest of the five quintuplets and the most self-centered. She already knows she is going to become a movie star and therefore gives signed autographs away.
- Harold Miller (森野ひのき, Morino Hinoki) is middle of the five quintuplets and the bookworm and wants to win the Nobel Prize.
- Austin Miller (森野あらし, Morino Arashi) the second youngest of the five quintuplets who wants to become a true superhero - a detective or something else.
- Karly Miller (森野こだま, Morino Kodama) is the youngest of the quintuplets. She wants to save the world and all animals (except frogs)
- Six Miller (ロクちゃん, Roku-chan) is an affectionate little dog owned by the Miller (Morino) family.

== Cast ==
=== Japanese ===
- Chie Koujiro - Arashi Morino
- Fujiko Takimoto - Kabuto Morino
- Hiro Yuuki - Hinoki Morino
- Kae Araki - Kodama Morino
- Yuko Mizutani - Kinoko Morino

=== English ===
- Sharon Alexander - Karly Miller
- Don Brown - Principal
- Noel Callahan - Karl Miller
- Gabe Khouth
- Danny McKinnon - Austin Miller
- Scott McNeil - Karl Miller
- Colin Murdock - Officer Collins
- Nicole Oliver - Ms. Carruthers
- Tabitha St. Germain - Krystal Miller
- Chantal Strand - Vanessa, Bridget
- Venus Terzo
- Cathy Weseluck - Harold Miller
- Jillian Michaels - Matthew, Mermaid (episodes 9, 48)
- Michael Coleman - Leroy Green (episode 24)

== Episode list ==
No.	Title	Original release date
1	"The First Day Of School" (Japanese: 入学式は大パニック!?)	April 14, 2001
1	"Six at Home" (Japanese: あらしとロクちゃん)	April 14, 2001
2	"Things are Shaping up" (Japanese: こだまのダイエット大作戦)	April 21, 2001
2	"Karl's First Love" (Japanese: かぶとの初恋)	April 21, 2001
3	"The Shopping Mall Model" (Japanese: きのこのアイドル・コンテスト)	April 28, 2001
3	"Harold's Ghost Theory" (Japanese: ひのきのオバケ退治)	April 28, 2001
4	"Super Sleuth Austin" (Japanese: 名探偵あらし 真犯人は誰だ!?)	May 5, 2001
4	"Karly's Un-Birthday" (Japanese: こだまの消えた誕生日)	May 5, 2001
5	"Karl Plays Cupid" (Japanese: かぶとは恋のキューピッド!)	May 12, 2001
5	"Make Up for Mother's Day" (Japanese: きのこの母の日大作戦)	May 12, 2001
6	"First Time at Home Alone" (Japanese: 初めてのお留守番)	May 19, 2001
6	"The Wrestling Tournament" (Japanese: ひのきのすもう大会)	May 19, 2001
7	"First Field Trip" (Japanese: ラブラブ遠足大騒動)	May 26, 2001
7	"Dad At Work!" (Japanese: パパの会社へゴーゴー!)	May 26, 2001
8	"Krystal Gets The Scoop" (Japanese: きのこのスクープを狙え!)	June 2, 2001
8	"Visiting the Dentist Is Scary" (Japanese: 恐怖の歯医者さん)	June 2, 2001
9	"Horoscope Hijinks" (Japanese: ひのきのおサカナ占い)	June 9, 2001
9	"Write On Mom!" (Japanese: ママは童話作家!?)	June 9, 2001
10	"A Visitor From Afar" (Japanese: きのこのラブラブ国際結婚?)	June 16, 2001
10	"Have A Seat Dad" (Japanese: パパに秘密のプレゼント)	June 16, 2001
11	"Swimming Pool Blues" (Japanese: プール開きでドッキリ!)	June 23, 2001
11	"Tiger Trouble!" (Japanese: がんばれ! サンダーズ)	June 23, 2001
12	"Runaway Quintuplet!" (Japanese: かぶとの家出)	June 30, 2001
12	"Spoiled Rotten" (Japanese: こだまの一日お母さん)	June 30, 2001
13	(Japanese: 名探偵あらし 姿なき怪盗!?)	July 7, 2001
13	(Japanese: きのこのスターへの道!)	July 7, 2001
14	"Fast Food Frenzy" (Japanese: こだまのフードバトル!)	July 14, 2001
14	(Japanese: 大変だ!! パパとママの大戦争)	July 14, 2001
15	"A Place of My Own" (Japanese: ひのきのぼくの部屋が欲しい!)	July 21, 2001
15	(Japanese: 五つ子・初めての飛行機)	July 21, 2001
16	"Dinosaur Tales" (Japanese: 北海道まるごと大冒険!!)	July 28, 2001
16	"What Dinosaur?" (Japanese: 北海道まるごと大冒険!! つづき)	July 28, 2001
17	"The Big Race" (Japanese: かぶとの新記録をねらえ!!)	August 4, 2001
17	"Ghost Trouble" (Japanese: きのこのコワ〜イ写真!?)	August 4, 2001
18	"Lesson In Love" (Japanese: かわばた巡査愛のレッスン!)	August 11, 2001
18	"Summer Santa" (Japanese: 真夏のサンタクロース)	August 11, 2001
19	"Doggone Dog" (Japanese: とどけ! ロクちゃんの言葉)	August 18, 2001
19	"A Helping Hand" (Japanese: アッコもビックリ!きのこの付き人)	August 18, 2001
20	"Krystal Storms The Stage" (Japanese: きのこの台風なんかぶっ飛ばせ!)	August 25, 2001
20	"Mom's Summer Vacation" (Japanese: ママの夏休み)	August 25, 2001
21	"A Girl's Best Friend" (Japanese: かぶとに恋のライバル!?)	September 1, 2001
21	"What're Friends For?!" (Japanese: あらしの万引き騒動)	September 1, 2001
22	"Grampa Comes To Visit!" (Japanese: ホラふきじいちゃんが来た!)	September 15, 2001
22	"Six Goes On A Date!" (Japanese: ロクちゃんのデート)	September 15, 2001
23	"Daddy's Girl" (Japanese: きのこの家出?)	September 22, 2001
23	"The World's Greatest Dog!" (Japanese: ロクちゃんのワンワン選手権)	September 22, 2001
24	"Karl's Got Game!" (Japanese: かぶとのシュートを決めろ!!)	September 29, 2001
24	"Super Sleuth Austin and the Shattered Shrine" (Japanese: 名探偵あらしvsきのこ)	September 29, 2001
25	"Swooning For Safety!" (Japanese: ラブラブ愛の交通安全)	October 6, 2001
25	"Krystal's Best Friend?" (Japanese: みかんはきのこの大親友!)	October 6, 2001
26	"Krytal's Pet Hamster"	October 13, 2001
27	"Brave Prince Karl" (Japanese: カリンちゃん、初めてのキス!)	October 20, 2001
27	"Mona's Revenge!" (Japanese: みかんの華麗なる復讐パーティー)	October 20, 2001
28	"Karly's Frog Adventure" (Japanese: こだまのケロケロ大冒険)	October 27, 2001
28	"Daddy's Sweetheart" (Japanese: パパの恋人?)	October 27, 2001
29	"Violet's Dancing Television Appearance" (Japanese: アイちゃんの踊るテレビ出演!?)	November 3, 2001
29	"Krystal Goes On a Date" (Japanese: きのこのデートでゲット大作戦!)	November 3, 2001
30	"Krystal and Mona's Television Debut" (Japanese: きのことみかんのシンデレラをねらえ!)	November 10, 2001
31	(Japanese: あらしの家出!)	November 17, 2001
31	(Japanese: かぶとの100点をねらえ!)	November 17, 2001
32	(Japanese: 森野家ビンボー脱出大作戦!)	November 24, 2001
32	(Japanese: あの子の素敵なバースデー)	November 24, 2001
33	(Japanese: こだまのラブラブ・フードバトル!)	December 1, 2001
33	(Japanese: ショック! くるみ先生にナゾの恋人)	December 1, 2001
34	(Japanese: ワガママ! 星の王子様)	December 8, 2001
35	(Japanese: きのことみかんの映画デビュー)	December 15, 2001
36	(Japanese: きのこに謎のラブレター)	December 22, 2001
36	(Japanese: 五つ子、サンタになる!?)	December 22, 2001
37	(Japanese: 呪いの部屋)	December 29, 2001
37	(Japanese: ひのきの宝くじ大騒動)	December 29, 2001
38	(Japanese: 徳川埋蔵金をさがせ!)	January 5, 2002
38	(Japanese: みかん屋敷のお正月スゴロク大会)	January 5, 2002
39	(Japanese: 涙の別れ! グッバイきのこ)	January 12, 2002
39	(Japanese: あらしの成人式!?)	January 12, 2002
40	(Japanese: プレイボーイあらし!)	January 19, 2002
40	(Japanese: 女の戦い! 大雪サバイバル)	January 19, 2002
41	(Japanese: きのこのキスキス大作戦!)	January 26, 2002
41	(Japanese: ひのきは一家の大黒柱!?)	January 26, 2002
42	(Japanese: カリスマ美容師きのこ!?)	February 2, 2002
42	(Japanese: あらしのイジメなんかやっつけろ!)	February 2, 2002
43	(Japanese: バレンタイン大パニック!!)	February 9, 2002
44	(Japanese: みかんの雪山大脱走!)	February 16, 2002
44	(Japanese: 幻の雪男VSひのき)	February 16, 2002
45	(Japanese: どっちが主役!? ひのきVSきのこ)	February 23, 2002
45	(Japanese: マジシャン猿のママさがし)	February 23, 2002
46	(Japanese: みかんの家出)	March 2, 2002
46	(Japanese: きのこのえなり君とスキャンダル♥)	March 2, 2002
47	(Japanese: 名探偵対決! あらしVSきのこ)	March 9, 2002
47	(Japanese: かぶとのホワイトデー)	March 9, 2002
48	(Japanese: ひのきのラブラブ大作戦!)	March 16, 2002
48	(Japanese: かぶと・タカ彦の友よさらば!!)	March 16, 2002
49	(Japanese: みかんが転校!)	March 23, 2002
49	(Japanese: 愛のラストボール)	March 23, 2002
50	(Japanese: きのこのお見合いトラブル!)	March 30, 2002
50	(Japanese: さよならロクちゃん)	March 30, 2002
