= Shaolin Wuzang =

Cartoon

- Shaolin Kids
- Genre: Action; Adventure
- Created by: Eric Paul Marais; Tian Xiao Zhang
- Directed by: Tian Xiao Zhang
- Composer: Gerald Roberts
- Countries of origin: China; France

Production
- Executive producer: Denis Olivieri
- Producers: Arne Lohnmann; Nicole Keeb
- Production companies: Les Cartooneurs Associés; ZDF Enterprises; Fantasia Animation

Original release
- Network: France 3
- Release: 13 December 2005 – 10 September 2015

Shaolin Wuzang (Chinese: 少林武藏; pinyin: Shàolín Wǔzàng), known in China as Zhonghua Xiaozi (Chinese: 中华小子; pinyin: Zhōnghuá Xiǎozi; lit. 'Chinese Kids'), is an animated television series produced by Les Cartooneurs Associés, Fantasia Animation, France 3 and Jetix Europe. It spans twenty-six episodes, over two thirteen episode seasons, which were broadcast on China Central Television in China, France 3 in France, and Disney Channel-Asia.

== Plot ==
In the 7th century, during the Sui dynasty a powerful demon named Heihu attempted to dominate all of China. But thanks to a grandmaster of Shaolin and three heroic Shaolin "knights", Heihu was defeated and mystically sealed inside a great bell.

After one-thousand years, in the 17th century—circa 1600-1618—a peasant woman comes across the bell (overgrown and forgotten in a forest, somewhere in the Henan Province). When she touches it, the mystic seal breaks and Heihu is freed. The demon chases the peasant woman down and possesses her body.

Not far away, at a Shaolin Temple, Master Sanzang watches over his students and followers. In the midst of the daily affairs, Heihu infiltrates the temple and ransacks its library in search of two special books. If the demon claims these books, he can become so powerful that no one could challenge him as he renews his quest for world domination. Heihu manages to uncover the first book at the temple—the Book of Wisdom—but disappears after failing to find the second one.

Meanwhile, Master Sanzang consults the spirits of the ancient Grand Masters of Shaolin. They tell him to seek out the spirits of the three Original Shaolin Knights who defeated Heihu. The three have been reincarnated into three young children, and so Master Sanzang must find them and train them, in order to defeat the Demon before he can find the second book.

== Characters ==
- Heihu—A powerful Demon, formerly sealed away inside the mystic prison-bell, now freed and attempting to take over the world once again. Originally depicted as a monster (in the series opening episode), Heihu has now possessed a peasant woman, and is using her body as a vessel for her power. She seeks two books—the Book of Wisdom and one other—to use their power to become unbeatable. To this end, she recruits an army of thugs—the Black Foxes—to do her bidding while she searches for the books.
- Master Sanzang—The current Grand Master of the Shaolin Temple. He is an old and stern yet kindly man. He has great skill in kung fu despite his advanced age. He gives sage advice and believes that, in spite of the age (and gender) of the charges, he must find and train they are the best hope for defeating the Demon.
- Hua—a 12-year-old girl. She is headstrong and mad about martial arts. She was with her grandmother, delivering laundry at the Temple when Heihu attacked. She attempted to aid Master Sanzang in keeping the Book of Wisdom away from Heihu's grasp. Even though she failed, the Spirit of the Grand Master indicated that she was one of the Reincarnated Knights, and that she would help Sanzang find the other two Knights. She impressed Master Sanzang with her use of a large cloth as a weapon, that he gave her a rope made of "an indestructible weave" to use in her battles. She also proves to have some form of qi power, as she creates an energy shield to protect herself from a serpent's attack (in Episode Two).
- Tang—a young man who is the son of one of the city governors in Henan Province. He is somewhat snobbish, and has high opinions of himself and his apparent destiny. He fights with Hua, and proves to have some adeptness with Kung Fu. To show his pride in Tang's appointment to Shaolin, his father gives him a sword his ancestor used in battle. Wearing round spectacles, he is very astute and clever to solve riddles and think on his feet. Tang is believed to be the second of the Three Knights.
- Chen—a young peasant boy whose village was ransacked by forces of Heihu. Chen was discovered by Hua, after she attempted to find aid in his village (which had been seized by the Black Foxes). The two ended up fighting the Black Foxes, along with Tang and Master Sanzang, defeating them and freeing the villagers. Showing skill with staves, Chen was given a three-second chain staff by Master Sanzang. Proving his courage and skill, he joined with Tang and Hua at the Shaolin Temple to train as the third Knight.

== Episode list ==
1. The Demon's Return (Le Retour du Démon)
2. Hangman's Swamp (Le Marais des Pendus, lit. "The Swamp of the Hanged")
3. Kwai Gonjin (Kwaï Gonjin)
4. Your Worst Enemy (Ton Pire Ennemi)
5. The River Dragons (Les Dragons-Rivières)
6. Eye in the Medallion (Le Revers de la Médaille, lit. "The back of the medallion")
7. The Daikinis (Les Dâkinis)
8. The Imperial Escort (L'Escorte Impériale)
9. The Wheel of Time (La roue du temps)
10. Deep Within the Mirror (Au fond du miroir)
11. The K'Uei (Les K'Uei)
12. Little Sister (Petite Soeur)
13. The Veil of Light (Le Voile de Lumière)
14. Frog Spirit (L'esprit grenouille)
15. Diamond Eyes (Les larmes de diamant, lit. "The tears of diamond")
16. The Ogres of Kaifeng (Les Ogres de Kaïfeng)
17. Yi's Sacred Bow (L'Arc Sacré de Yi)
18. The Pavilion of Whispers (Le pavillon des murmures)
19. Young Love (Amour de Jeunesse)
20. The Realm of Quiet Waters (Le Royaume des Eaux Calmes) Note: "royaume" ("realm") also translates to "kingdom"
21. A Thousand Faces (Mille Visages)
22. Kuulnn (Kunlun)
23. Shadow Thief (Le Voleur d'Ombres)
24. The Invisible Castle (Le Château Invisible)
25. Xi-Rang (Xi Rang)
26. The Trap (Le Piège)

== Possibility of a sequel ==
In 2016, the creator of the series, Zhang Tian Xiao, announced on his Weibo account that he planned on making a Shaolin Wuzang sequel in movie version, and was in the process of making a script for the movie. However, due to shortage in production, the making of the sequel was delayed. On 7 August 2018, Zhang announced that he received an invitation from the Ministry of Commerce to give a speech on 11 August 2018 about the possible sequel of the Chinese cartoon. In addition, he plans on holding a fan meeting by the end of 2018 or early 2019 in China.

The release of Shaolin Wuzang 2 is yet to be determined.
