= List of programs broadcast by Disney XD =

This is a list of programs and specials formerly and currently broadcast by the children's cable television channel Disney XD in the United States, and previously throughout the world on its international sister networks. Dates listed below are for American premiere or finales.

== Current programming ==
=== Original programming ===
- ^{1} Indicates its program is shared with Disney Channel cable channel.

==== Animated series ====
Title	Premiere date	Source(s)
Phineas and Ferb^{1}	February 13, 2009	(Note: Select episodes premiered on Disney XD before airing on Disney Channel later.)
Big City Greens^{1}	September 3, 2018	(Note: This series was originally going to air new episodes on Disney XD, but it instead began airing new episodes on Disney Channel while Disney XD would air reruns. Despite this, the show began to simulcast with Disney XD with its fourth season.)
Chibiverse^{1}	November 14, 2022	(Note: The show began to simulcast with Disney XD with its second season.)
Kiff^{1}	March 10, 2023	
Dragon Striker	June 9, 2026	

==== Live-action series ====
Title	Premiere date	Current season	Source(s)
Armorsaurs	October 13, 2025	1	

=== Acquired programming ===
==== Animated series ====
Title	Premiere date	Current season	Source(s)
Pokémon the Series	December 5, 2016	2	
Beyblade X	July 13, 2024	3	
Miraculous: Tales of Ladybug & Cat Noir^{1}	January 3, 2025	7	(Note: The show began to simulcast with Disney XD with its sixth season and beyond.)
Yu-Gi-Oh! Go Rush!!	January 11, 2025	2	

=== Repeats of ended series ===
A list of programs currently broadcast in reruns.

==== Animated series ====
Title	Premiere date	Finale date	Date(s) reran	Note(s)
Gravity Falls	August 5, 2012	February 15, 2016	2016–present	(Note: This series was originally syndicated from Disney Channel, but later moved to Disney XD.)
DuckTales	August 12, 2017	March 15, 2021	2021–present	(Note: The series was originally moved to Disney Channel on May 1, 2018. Disney XD continued to air reruns of the show when it was moved. Beginning on April 4, 2020, regular premieres were switched back to Disney XD. DuckTales is still considered both a Disney Channel & Disney XD original.)
Spider-Man	August 19, 2017	October 25, 2020	2020–21; 2023; 2026–present	
Star Wars Resistance	October 7, 2018	January 26, 2020	2020; 2022–present	(Note: During its original run, new episodes of this series premiered simultaneously on Disney Channel and Disney XD.)
Moon Girl and Devil Dinosaur^{1}	May 29, 2023	March 8, 2025	2025–present	(Note: The show began to simulcast with Disney XD with its second and final season.)
Bakugan	September 23, 2023	March 30, 2024	2024–present	

=== Programming from Disney Channel ===
==== Animated series ====
Title	Premiere date	Source(s)
Kim Possible	February 3, 2014	
Lilo & Stitch: The Series	March 11, 2018	

==== Live-action series ====
Title	Premiere date	Source(s)
Even Stevens	February 14, 2009	
The Suite Life on Deck	April 24, 2009	
Wizards of Waverly Place	February 13, 2012	
That's So Raven	August 5, 2026	
Lizzie McGuire	August 6, 2026	
Hannah Montana	August 7, 2026	

=== Syndicated ===
==== Animated ====
Title	Premiere date	Source(s)
Chip 'n Dale: Rescue Rangers	May 19, 2022	
Recess	April 14, 2009	

== Upcoming programming ==
=== Acquired programming ===
==== Animated series ====
Title	Premiere date	Source(s)
Pokémon Tales: The Misadventures of Sirfetch’d & Pichu	2027	

== Former programming ==
=== Original programming ===
==== Animated series ====
- ^{1} Indicates program moved from Jetix.
- ^{2} Indicates program moved to the Disney Channel cable channel.
- ^{3} Indicates program is shared with the Disney Channel cable channel.

Title	Premiere date	Finale date	Date(s) reran	Note(s)
Yin Yang Yo!^{1}	February 13, 2009	April 18, 2009	2009–10	
Kick Buttowski: Suburban Daredevil	February 13, 2010	December 2, 2012	2012–21; 2023–24	
Motorcity	April 30, 2012	January 7, 2013	2013; 2015; 2020	
Tron: Uprising	May 21, 2012	January 28, 2013	2013; 2015; 2020–21; 2025	
Randy Cunningham: 9th Grade Ninja	August 13, 2012	July 27, 2015	2015–18; 2020–21	
Wander Over Yonder	December 9, 2013	June 27, 2016	2016–21; 2023; 2025–26	
The 7D	July 7, 2014	November 5, 2016	2016–17	
Star Wars Rebels	October 3, 2014	March 5, 2018	2018–21; 2023–26	
Penn Zero: Part-Time Hero	December 5, 2014	July 28, 2017	2017–21; 2026	
Star vs. the Forces of Evil	February 16, 2015	May 25, 2019	2019–21; 2026	(Note: Moved to Disney Channel for its fourth and final season.)
Pickle and Peanut	September 7, 2015	January 20, 2018	2018–22; 2024–26	
Lego Star Wars: The Freemaker Adventures	June 20, 2016	August 16, 2017	2017–18; 2021–22	
Future-Worm!	August 1, 2016	May 19, 2018	2018–19; 2025–26	
Right Now Kapow	September 19, 2016	May 31, 2017	2017–18	(Note: Produced and owned by rival company Warner Bros. Animation.)
Milo Murphy's Law^{2}	October 3, 2016	May 18, 2019	2019; 2021–25	(Note: Moved to Disney Channel for its second and final season.)
Billy Dilley's Super-Duper Subterranean Summer	June 3, 2017	June 15, 2017	2017–18; 2020; 2026	
Big Hero 6: The Series	November 20, 2017	February 15, 2021	2021–26	(Note: This series premiered simultaneously on Disney Channel and Disney XD on November 20, 2017. It was intended for regular premieres on Disney XD afterward, but was instead moved to Disney Channel after the premiere of the first episode, while Disney XD continues to air re-runs. In 2020, regular premieres were switched back to Disney XD.)
The Owl House^{3}	March 23, 2020	April 8, 2023	2023–26	(Note: The show began to simulcast with Disney XD with its third and final season.)
The Ghost and Molly McGee^{3}	January 10, 2022	January 13, 2024	2024–26	(Note: The show began to simulcast with Disney XD with its second and final season.)
Hamster & Gretel^{3}	August 12, 2022	April 13, 2025	2025–26	(Note: This series premiered simultaneously on Disney Channel and Disney XD on August 12, 2022. Regular premieres would premiere first on Disney Channel while Disney XD would air reruns on its first season. The show began to simulcast with Disney XD with its second season.)
Monsters at Work^{3}	January 9, 2023	May 4, 2024	2024	(Note: This series aired as a Disney+ original in its first season but became a Disney Channel original and simulcast with Disney XD starting with its second season.)
Hailey's On It!^{3}	June 8, 2023	May 18, 2024	2024	
Zombies: The Re-Animated Series^{3}	June 28, 2024	October 27, 2026	2026	
Primos^{3}	July 25, 2024	April 27, 2025	2025–26	
StuGo^{3}	January 11, 2025	May 3, 2025	2025–26	
Marvel Universe programming
The Spectacular Spider-Man	March 23, 2009	November 18, 2009	2009–10	(Note: First-run episodes started airing on June 22, 2009 after previously airing on Kids' WB.)
The Avengers: Earth's Mightiest Heroes	October 20, 2010	May 5, 2013	2013; 2023	
Ultimate Spider-Man	April 1, 2012	January 7, 2017	2017–21; 2023	
Avengers Assemble	May 26, 2013	February 24, 2019	2019; 2022–23	
Hulk and the Agents of S.M.A.S.H.	August 11, 2013	June 28, 2015	2015; 2023	
Guardians of the Galaxy	September 5, 2015	June 9, 2019	2019; 2021; 2023	

==== Live-action series ====
Title	Premiere date	Finale date	Date(s) reran	Note(s)
Aaron Stone	February 13, 2009	July 30, 2010	2010–11; 2015	
Zeke and Luther	June 15, 2009	April 2, 2012	2012–17	
I'm in the Band	November 27, 2009	December 9, 2011	2011–12; 2015	
Pair of Kings	September 22, 2010	February 18, 2013	2013–16	
Kickin' It	June 13, 2011	March 25, 2015	2015–17; 2019–20	
Lab Rats	February 27, 2012	February 3, 2016	2016–22	
Crash & Bernstein	October 8, 2012	August 11, 2014	2014	
Mighty Med	October 7, 2013	September 9, 2015	2015–17	
Kirby Buckets	October 20, 2014	February 2, 2017	2017; 2020–21	
Gamer's Guide to Pretty Much Everything	July 22, 2015	January 2, 2017	2017–18	
Lab Rats: Elite Force	March 2, 2016	October 22, 2016	2016–17; 2021	
Walk the Prank	April 6, 2016	July 16, 2018	2018–22	
Mech-X4	December 5, 2016	August 20, 2018	2021	(Note: First-run episodes started airing on April 17, 2017 after previously airing on Disney Channel.)
G.O.A.T.	November 6, 2021	April 23, 2022	—N/a	
Eye Wonder	November 6, 2021	April 23, 2022	—N/a	
Roman to the Rescue	February 12, 2022	August 20, 2022	2022	

==== Miniseries ====
Title	Premiere date	Finale date	Date(s) reran	Note(s)
Lego Star Wars: Droid Tales	July 6, 2015	November 2, 2015	2015–18	
Lego Star Wars: The Resistance Rises	February 15, 2016	May 4, 2016	—N/a	

==== Short series ====
Title	Years aired	Note(s)
Bruno the Great	2009	
Robodz	2009	
Moises Rules	2009	
Next X	2009	
Shreducation	2009–10	
Disney XD Shortstop	2009-11	
Team Smithereen	2009-11	
SportsCenter High-5	2010–17	
Wipeout Moments	2010–11	
Gravity Falls shorts	2013–14	
Future-Worm! shorts	2015	
Two More Eggs	2015–17	
Wander Over Yonder shorts	2015	
Marvel Universe shorts
Guardians of the Galaxy shorts	2017	

==== DXP programming ====
Title	Production company	Premiere date	Finale date	Format	Ref(s)
Parker Plays	Disney Digital Network; Digomind Productions	July 15, 2017	November 19, 2018	Playthroughs	
Player Select	Attack Media	July 15, 2017	November 23, 2020	Playthroughs	
Polaris Primetime	Maker Studios; Digomind Productions	July 15, 2017	September 2, 2017	Playthrough gaming variety show hosted by Jimmy Wong and Strawburry17	
The IGN Show	IGN	July 17, 2017	September 8, 2017	Daily show	
Play with Caution	Blue Ribbon Content	July 17, 2017	July 20, 2017	Competition show	
The Attack	Attack Media	July 31, 2017	September 5, 2017	Daily show	
Waypoint Presents	Waypoint (Vice Media)	August 16, 2017	October 5, 2017	Top gaming stories	
ESL Speedrunners	ESL	August 1, 2017	October 5, 2017	Speedrun playthroughs	
Overwatch Contenders	Blizzard	September 16, 2017	November 5, 2017	Overwatch-themed playthroughs (later minor esports competition)	

=== Acquired programming ===
==== Animated ====
Title	Premiere date	Finale date	Original network	Note(s)
Jimmy Two-Shoes	February 13, 2009	July 15, 2011	Teletoon	
Kid vs. Kat	February 13, 2009	July 20, 2011	YTV	
Naruto: Shippuden	October 28, 2009	November 5, 2011	TV Tokyo	
Rated A for Awesome	June 20, 2011	January 31, 2012	YTV	
Stitch!	October 24, 2011	October 27, 2011	TV Asahi	
The Jungle Book	June 11, 2012	October 5, 2012	TF1	
Slugterra	October 15, 2012	October 19, 2013	Family Chrgd	
Max Steel	March 25, 2013	December 7, 2013	Disney XD	
Pac-Man and the Ghostly Adventures	June 15, 2013	December 26, 2015	Family Chrgd	
Camp Lakebottom	July 13, 2013	October 30, 2014	Teletoon	
Packages from Planet X	July 13, 2013	February 21, 2014	Teletoon	
Xiaolin Chronicles	August 26, 2013	February 11, 2014	Gulli & Canal J Disney XD & Netflix	
Boyster	June 16, 2014	November 10, 2014	Disney XD; France 4	
Doraemon: Gadget Cat from the Future	July 7, 2014	September 1, 2015	TV Asahi	
Yo-kai Watch	October 5, 2015	August 16, 2020	TV Tokyo	
Counterfeit Cat	May 27, 2016	January 30, 2017	Teletoon	
Atomic Puppet	May 30, 2016	March 8, 2017	Teletoon	
Fangbone!	July 5, 2016	March 20, 2017	Family Chrgd	
Beyblade Burst	December 19, 2016	November 11, 2017	TV Tokyo	
Pokémon the Series: XY	February 11, 2017	April 6, 2017	TV Tokyo	
Pokémon the Series: XY Kalos Quest	April 8, 2017	May 31, 2017	TV Tokyo	
Pokémon the Series: Sun & Moon	May 12, 2017	December 9, 2017	TV Tokyo	
Pokémon the Series: XYZ	June 7, 2017	September 18, 2017	TV Tokyo	
Pokémon the Series: Sun & Moon – Ultra Adventures	March 24, 2018	February 23, 2019	TV Tokyo	
Beyblade Burst Evolution	December 4, 2017	November 17, 2018	TV Tokyo	
Beyblade Burst Turbo	December 15, 2018	December 21, 2019	TV Tokyo	
Pokémon the Series: Sun & Moon – Ultra Legends	March 23, 2019	March 7, 2020	TV Tokyo	
Inazuma Eleven: Ares	April 13, 2019	October 12, 2019	TV Tokyo	
Hotel Transylvania: The Series	September 30, 2019	December 17, 2019	Teletoon	
Beyblade Burst Rise	February 8, 2020	October 3, 2020	YouTube (CoroCoro & Takara Tomy)	
Oddbods	October 17, 2020	December 7, 2020	CITV	
Beyblade: Metal Fusion	January 2, 2021		TV Tokyo	
Beyblade: Metal Masters	January 2, 2021		TV Tokyo	
Beyblade: Metal Fury	January 3, 2021		TV Tokyo	
Beyblade: Shogun Steel	January 3, 2021		TV Tokyo	
Beyblade Burst Surge	February 20, 2021	October 9, 2021	YouTube (CoroCoro & Takara Tomy)	
101 Dalmatian Street	March 29, 2021	November 22, 2021	Disney Channel	
Legend of the Three Caballeros	August 7, 2021	October 30, 2021	DisneyLife	
Ghostforce	October 4, 2021	October 7, 2022	TFOU	
Beyblade Burst QuadDrive	December 4, 2021	November 26, 2022	YouTube (CoroCoro & Takara Tomy)	
PJ Masks	January 3, 2022	February 24, 2022	Disney Channel & Disney Junior; France 5 & TF1	(Note: Only 25 of 26 episodes from each of the first three seasons premiered on the network.) (Note: Reruns continued to air on Disney XD until March 22, 2022.)
Gigantosaurus	January 3, 2022	February 4, 2022	Disney Channel & Disney Junior; France 5	
Yu-Gi-Oh! Sevens	June 6, 2022	December 2, 2023	TV Tokyo	
Beyblade Burst QuadStrike	April 3, 2023	December 2, 2023	TV Tokyo	
The Super Hero Squad Show	August 31, 2023	November 19, 2023	Cartoon Network	

==== Live-action ====
Title	Premiere date	Finale date	Original network	Source(s)
America's Funniest Home Videos: Animal Edition	September 18, 2021	November 27, 2021	Nat Geo Wild	
BattleBots	May 23, 2016	June 17, 2016	ABC	
Brain Games	October 23, 2021	January 22, 2022	National Geographic	
Doctor Who	June 13, 2015	September 19, 2015	BBC One	
Fort Boyard: Ultimate Challenge	October 17, 2011	March 23, 2012	CITV	
Gaming Show (In My Parents' Garage)	September 9, 2015	September 30, 2015	Family Chrgd	
Howie Mandel's Animals Doing Things	February 12, 2022	August 27, 2022	Nat Geo Wild	
Japanizi: Going, Going, Gong!	November 18, 2013	November 29, 2013	YTV	
Just Kidding	November 19, 2012	November 30, 2014	Teletoon	
Mr. Young	September 26, 2011	May 12, 2013	YTV	
Out There with Jack Randall	April 2, 2022	April 30, 2022	Nat Geo Wild	
Weird but True!	July 23, 2022		National Geographic Kids; Disney+	

=== Syndicated ===
==== Animated ====
Title	Premiere date	Finale date	Original network	Note(s)
The Avengers: United They Stand	February 13, 2009	August 29, 2010	FOX Kids	
Batman: The Animated Series	February 15, 2009	September 27, 2010	FOX Kids	
A.T.O.M.: Alpha Teens on Machines	February 13, 2009	June 13, 2009	Jetix	
Chaotic	February 18, 2009	September 1, 2010	4Kids TV; The CW4Kids; Cartoon Network	
Digimon Data Squad	February 13, 2009	June 13, 2009	Fuji TV	
Fantastic Four	February 15, 2009	March 12, 2012	The Marvel Action Hour syndication	
Fillmore!	March 17, 2009	August 16, 2009	Toon Disney; ABC Kids	
Fillmore!	April 19, 2018		Toon Disney; ABC Kids	
Gargoyles	February 13, 2009	October 15, 2012	The Disney Afternoon syndication ABC	
The Incredible Hulk	February 13, 2009	March 12, 2012	UPN	
Iron Man	February 15, 2009	March 12, 2012	The Marvel Action Hour syndication	
Jackie Chan Adventures	February 15, 2009	September 27, 2010	The WB	
Legend of the Dragon	February 19, 2009		BKN syndication	
The Legend of Tarzan	February 13, 2009	May 14, 2012	ABC; UPN	
Ōban Star-Racers	February 13, 2009	June 13, 2009	Jetix	
Pinky and the Brain	February 15, 2009	June 15, 2009	The WB	
Silver Surfer	February 17, 2009	March 12, 2012	FOX Kids	
Sonic Underground	June 11, 2012	December 14, 2012	BKN syndication	
Monster Buster Club	February 13, 2009	December 28, 2010	Jetix	
Get Ed	February 13, 2009	June 13, 2009	Jetix	
Pucca	February 17, 2009	December 27, 2009	Jetix	
Super Robot Monkey Team Hyperforce Go!	February 13, 2009	June 14, 2009	ABC Family; Jetix	
Spider-Man	February 13, 2009	January 2, 2012	FOX Kids	
Spider-Man and His Amazing Friends	February 26, 2009	January 2, 2012	NBC	
Spider-Man Unlimited	February 15, 2009	January 2, 2012	FOX Kids	
Static Shock	February 14, 2009	September 27, 2010	The WB	
Storm Hawks	February 28, 2011	March 17, 2011	Cartoon Network; YTV	
Superman: The Animated Series	February 15, 2009	September 27, 2010	The WB	
X-Men	February 13, 2009	March 12, 2012	FOX Kids	
X-Men: Evolution	June 15, 2009	December 30, 2011	The WB	

==== Live-action ====
Title	Premiere date	Finale date	Original network	Note(s)
The Fresh Prince of Bel-Air	September 18, 2009	August 14, 2010	NBC	
My Babysitter's a Vampire	November 7, 2011	December 7, 2012	Teletoon	

==== Movies ====
Title	Premiere date	Note(s)
Naruto Shippuden the Movie	May 15, 2011	

=== Programming from Disney Channel ===
==== Animated series ====
Title	Premiere date	End date	Source(s)
Cars Toons	February 13, 2009	August 31, 2012	
American Dragon: Jake Long	February 14, 2009	October 15, 2012	
The Emperor's New School^{2}	February 27, 2009	December 10, 2025	
The Replacements^{2}	February 27, 2009	December 25, 2009	
Fish Hooks	February 19, 2011	August 3, 2026	
Mickey Mouse	November 29, 2013	November 18, 2025	
Amphibia	August 5, 2019	August 1, 2026	
Tangled: The Series	July 7, 2024	May 24, 2026	

==== Live-action series ====
Title	Premiere date	End date	Source(s)
The Suite Life of Zack & Cody	February 13, 2009	November 2, 2026	
The Famous Jett Jackson	February 14, 2009	May 1, 2009	
Phil of the Future^{2}	February 15, 2009	December 11, 2009	
Cory in the House	May 19, 2009	April 26, 2011	
So Random!	August 21, 2012	June 30, 2013	
Code: 9	November 19, 2012	November 17, 2016	
Jessie	June 28, 2013	June 30, 2014	
PrankStars	November 15, 2016	November 24, 2016	
Secrets of Sulphur Springs	May 7, 2022	June 4, 2022	

=== Programming from Disney Junior ===
Title	Premiere date	End date	Source(s)
Spidey and His Amazing Friends	January 3, 2022	March 31, 2024	
Star Wars: Young Jedi Adventures	May 4, 2023	June 1, 2025	

=== Programming from Disney+ ===
Title	Premiere date	End date	Source(s)
The Proud Family: Louder and Prouder	January 8, 2023	February 5, 2023	
Chip 'n' Dale: Park Life	January 14, 2023	March 26, 2023	
Win or Lose	July 7, 2025	September 28, 2025	
Dream Productions	August 30, 2025	September 20, 2025	
Iwájú	February 6, 2026	February 20, 2026	

== Original films ==
Title	Premiere date	Note(s)
Skyrunners	November 27, 2009	
Pants on Fire	November 9, 2014	
Mark & Russell's Wild Ride	November 23, 2015	

== Programming blocks ==
=== Former ===
- Disney XD's Saturday Morning (2009–13)
- Disney XD's My Life (2010)
- Saturday Mornings Disney XD Style (2010)
- Phineas and Ferb's Summer Vacation (2010)
- Marvel Universe (2012–19)
- Nonstop Summer (2012–13)
- Disney Fandom (2013)
- Randomation Animation (2013–14)
- Show Me the Monday (2013–14)
- Show Me the Shark (2014)
- Animacation (2014)
- Anime Block (2017–20)
- D|XP (2017)

== See also ==
- ABC Kids
- List of programs broadcast by Disney Channel
- List of programs broadcast by Fox Kids, whose library was merged into the Toon Disney schedule in 2002
- List of programs broadcast by Jetix, Toon Disney's evening block from 2004 until 2009
- List of programs broadcast by Toon Disney, its branding from 1998 until 2009
