= Jetix Play =

Children's entertainment brand

- Type: Children's television network
- Country: United Kingdom
- Broadcast area: Central and Eastern Europe, Middle East
- Network: Jetix
- Headquarters: 338 Euston Road, London, United Kingdom

Programming
- Languages: English, Polish, Turkish, Russian
- Picture format: 576i (SDTV)

Ownership
- Owner: Jetix Europe
- Parent: Jetix Europe (The Walt Disney Company)
- Sister channels: Jetix

History
- Founded: January 2003 (as Fox Kids Play); 1 January 2005 (as Jetix Play)
- Launched: January 2003 (Poland); October 2003 (Eastern Europe and Turkey, later in MENA)
- Closed: 31 July 2010 (CEE); 1 September 2010 (Middle East)
- Replaced by: Playhouse Disney (most countries)
- Former names: Fox Kids Play (2003–2004)

Links
- Website: web.archive.org/web/20091002043720/http://www.jetixplay.tv/ (archived)

Jetix Play (formerly Fox Kids Play) was a children's entertainment brand, owned by Jetix Europe. The Jetix Play name was primarily used as a sister channel to Jetix in a small number of regions, such as Central and Eastern Europe, and the Middle East.

== History ==
The channel originally launched as Fox Kids Play in January 2003 in Poland, and later launched in October 2003 in CEE (Including Russia) and MENA regions (including Turkey). Fox Kids Play was aimed at a younger audience than the main Jetix channel and primarily showed archived programming from BVS Entertainment and Fox Kids Europe's catalogues. The channel was available for 12 hours per day, from 6 A.M. to 6 P.M.

On 1 January 2005, Fox Kids Play was rebranded as Jetix Play.

On November 1, 2008, Jetix Play increased its broadcast period from 12 to almost 17 hours per day, from 6 A.M. to 10:45 P.M.

After The Walt Disney Company increased their ownership in Jetix Europe, they planned to rebrand the channels after Jetix's rebranding into Disney XD or Disney Channel. Near its closure, the channel progressively ceased its carriage on operators in Poland, while stopping to air commercials in late May 2010. The channel closed on 1 August 2010 in Poland and in Middle East on 1 September 2010. The channel was replaced with Playhouse Disney in most regions.

== Programming ==
Programming on Jetix Play consisted of archive programming of animated cartoons and television series from BVS Entertainment's catalogue, which included shows from Saban Entertainment and the pre-1990 catalogue of DIC Entertainment, which BVS/Fox Kids Europe owned international rights to at the time.

== Other uses ==
Fox Kids Play was used by Fox Kids Europe as an interactive VOD in France and Israel, and expanded in the United Kingdom when it was added to Telewest in July 2003. The service consisted of various television games based on Fox Kids programmes and third-party properties. The service extended to Sky Digital in March 2004.

In the Netherlands, a Jetix Play branded block was featured on Jetix. Unlike the channel, this block was strictly pre-school-focused and aired acquired shows aimed towards younger children, including The Koala Brothers, Bob the Builder, Hamtaro, and Strawberry Shortcake. In 2008, the block began airing In the Night Garden...,

Between 2006 and 2007, in Romania and other CEE countries, a Jetix Play programming block was broadcast on Jetix, which similarity to the named channel aired archived programming from BVS's catalogue.
