= The Owl (TV series) =

2006 French-German TV series or program

- Genre: Comedy
- Created by: Alexandre So
- Directed by: Alexandre So
- Theme music composer: Low Entertainment
- Opening theme: "Opening"
- Ending theme: "Ending"
- Country of origin: France; Germany
- No. of series: 1
- No. of episodes: 52

Production
- Running time: 1 minute
- Production companies: Studio Hari; TV-Loonland AG; France Télévisions

Original release
- Network: France 3
- Release: May 5, 2006 – July 12, 2007

Related
- The Owl & Co

The Owl (French: La Chouette) is a series of short 3D CGI episodes for children's television. It is a silent comedy revolving around the life of a grumpy and unlucky owl, who has trouble dealing with all sorts of surreal situations and gets comically dismembered at the end.

== Plot ==
The series features the eponymous Owl, pink in color, and with blue feet that "float" below her body. The Owl also resembles a plastic figurine and has a grumpy, anti-social personality. Each of the minute-long fifty-two episodes centers on the Owl attempting to overcome unfortunate circumstances, but as a running gag, end in her demise by her various appendages and body being dispensed of in unusual or comical ways.

The series' setting takes place high above at an undistinguished tree, a la a "bottle show". The Owl occasionally also encounters other species, like birds, bats and even an athletic frog, to which these never end well for her. Other situations involve surreal events, like floating objects and exploding apples.

== Episodes ==
1. Windy
2. The Ant
3. Bubbles
4. The Woodpecker
5. The Lightning
6. Roller Coaster
7. Bat Owl
8. The Pigeons
9. Apple Storm
10. Gluttony
11. The Sticky Caterpillar
12. The Stork
13. The Race
14. Squirrel Thief
15. Puppets
16. The Tyre Swing
17. The Bees
18. Badminton
19. Spider Time
20. The Magpie
21. Christmas Small Boxes
22. Trampoline
23. Surveillance
24. Space Owl
25. The Kite
26. Break Dance
27. Chewing Gum
28. The Sloth
29. Boomerang
30. Master Crow
31. Sheep
32. The Bugging Parrot
33. The Cardinal
34. The Mosquito
35. The Xhaolin Frog
36. Monkey Musician
37. The Dung Beetle
38. The Pinball
39. The Fireflies
40. The Elevator
41. The Prop Tree
42. Chameleon
43. Ball Trap
44. Child's Play
45. Living Nature
46. The Dream
47. The Fly
48. Flying Saucer
49. Christmas Present
50. The Giraffe
51. Fireworks
52. The Party

== See also ==
- The Owl & Co – A serialized spinoff, featuring more prominent characters in a large forest setting also made by Studio Hari.
