= Jetix =

Defunct children's entertainment brand

- Type: Children's television network and programming block
- Country: United States; Netherlands; Argentina
- Broadcast area: Worldwide
- Stations: Jetix Play
- Headquarters: Burbank, California (US programming block); Buenos Aires, Argentina (Latin American channel); Hilversum, Netherlands (European and MENA channels)

Programming
- Language: Available in over 20 languages
- Picture format: 720p (HDTV); 480i/576i (SDTV)
- Timeshift service: Jetix +1 (United Kingdom and Italy)

Ownership
- Owner: The Walt Disney Company
- Parent: Disney Channels Worldwide (North America) The Walt Disney Company (Latin America) Jetix Europe N.V. (Europe, Middle East)
- Sister channels: Jetix Play (Central and Eastern Europe, Middle East, North Africa); Jetix Max; GXT (Italy); K2 (Italy)

History
- Founded: January 2004
- Launched: 14 February 2004 (as a programming block); August 2004 (as a channel)
- Replaced: Fox Kids (Europe, Latin America)
- Closed: 13 February 2009 (programming block in the US); 10 August 2010 (as a channel)
- Replaced by: Disney XD or Disney Channel (see table)
- Former names: Fox Kids (in Europe, Middle East, and Latin America)

Links
- Website: jetix.net (Europe) jetixtv.com (Latin America) jetix.tv (US)

Jetix (stylized in all caps) was a children's entertainment brand owned by The Walt Disney Company. The brand was for a slate of action- and adventure-related programming blocks and television channels. Jetix programming mainly originated from the Saban Entertainment library, airing live-action and animated series with some original programming. The channel's target audience was older children and adolescents aged 8–15.

Jetix was first launched as a programming block in the United States on Toon Disney on 14 February 2004, to compete with Cartoon Network's Toonami block, and in Europe in April 2004. By the end of 2004, Jetix began completely replacing the international Fox Kids channels around the world, the first being the French version in August 2004, and the last one being the German version, in June 2005.

Although it was commercially successful, the Jetix brand was discontinued in 2009. All international channels were rebranded as either Disney XD or Disney Channel due to The Walt Disney Company's focus on its existing television brands. The last Jetix channel to shut down was Jetix channel in Russia (replaced with Disney Channel Russia) on 10 August 2010, and was fully discontinued with the shutdown of Jetix Play in the Middle East on 1 September 2010, which was replaced with Playhouse Disney, later Disney Junior.

== History ==
=== Development of the Jetix brand and launch in the United States ===
In January 2004, Fox Kids Europe, Fox Kids Latin America (both of which were purchased by Disney in 2001 as part of Fox Family Worldwide) and the ABC Cable Networks Group agreed to rename its then current operations under a single brand, called Jetix, which helped strengthen its then operations into a single force. The Jetix name was applied to its programming blocks which aired on ABC Family and Toon Disney, its television channels in Europe and Latin America, along with its program library and merchandising. After Fox Kids closed in the US, much of the content previously aired on the block moved to ABC Family and Toon Disney; the international Fox Kids networks kept operating despite their US forerunner becoming defunct.

The Jetix name was chosen after the company conducted international research specifically with a number of children's focus groups. Many of the children chose the name as it implied action and adventure, and the company was able to use the name internationally due to its ambiguity. Bruce Steinberg, chairman and chief executive officer of Fox Kids Europe, explained that Jetix would help strengthen Fox Kids Europe's partnership with Disney while building new alliances to continue to successfully leverage its programming library and distribution.

On 14 February 2004, Toon Disney and ABC Family launched Jetix with Jetix Cards Live, the world's first concurrently online and telecast trading card game. ABC Family aired Jetix on weekdays from 7am to 9am and weekends 7am to 12 noon ET/PT. The block also aired on Toon Disney on both weekdays (Monday-Thursday) and weekends from 7pm to 9pm ET/PT.

=== International expansion and transition of the Fox Kids brand into Jetix ===
Outside of the United States, Jetix was first launched as a programming block on the European Fox Kids channels in April 2004, airing in mornings and afternoons.

The transition of Fox Kids networks into Jetix started in August 2004 with the French version's rebranding, which was followed by the Latin American version later in the month. The transitioning continued throughout 2004 and 2005 with the rebranding of the Scandinavian version in October 2004, versions in most European territories in January 2005, the Netherlands in February, and Italy and Israel in March. The transition was completed in June 2005 when the final Fox Kids network in Germany was rebranded as Jetix.

The Fox Kids Play channels available in CEE and MENA (which primarily aired archive programming from Saban, Fox Kids, and Jetix archives, including some DiC Entertainment shows) were rebranded as Jetix Play, on 1 January 2005.

The Jetix brand unified the children's programming department at ABC's domestic cable networks, as well as Fox Kids in Europe and Latin America, in a joint programming alliance. The first Jetix Europe co-productions were W.I.T.C.H. and Super Robot Monkey Team Hyperforce Go!, with Get Ed and Yin Yang Yo! following in 2005 and 2006 respectively.

=== Rebrand as Disney XD in the United States and international discontinuation ===
In Fall 2006, Toon Disney in the United States became the exclusive home for Jetix, effectively ending the block on ABC Family. The Jetix programming block took up most of Toon Disney's airtime, taking 12 hours on weekdays and 19 hours on weekends, until the network was replaced by Disney XD in the United States on 13 February 2009.

Disney XD was to be slightly different from Jetix; it still mostly focused on the boy demographic but would include more live-action productions under the Disney banner and also be a home for Disney's recent animated productions (for both boys and girls), effectively superseding Toon Disney in the United States. The new brand was to be "aimed at boys ages 6–14 and features content focusing on the themes of adventure, accomplishment, gaming, music and sports."

On 8 December 2008, two months before the American launch of Disney XD, Disney announced that it would be increasing its shares in Jetix Europe to 96% with the intention to buy the remaining shares in the company, effectively ending Jetix Europe's autonomy. Disney wanted full control of the company and to bring the European Jetix channels completely under the Disney umbrella, enabling Disney to have a singular unified strategy for its channels. After the completion of Jetix Europe's share buy-back offer, Jetix Europe was delisted from the Euronext Amsterdam stock exchange on 27 February 2009. In the discontinuation of the Jetix brand, Jetix Europe's CEO Paul Taylor resigned, with John Hardie, the Executive Vice President of Disney Channels EMEA as CEO on 11 February 2009. John Hardie left Disney for ITN in June 2009 and was replaced with Giorgio Stock (who later became head of Turner Broadcasting System Europe).

In June 2008, Disney France announced that Disney Channel and Jetix would merge operations; at the time, Jetix was being affected by falling carriage rates and came close to being removed from the CanalSat television provider in France after protracted negotiations. Jetix France was the first European version of Jetix to make the conversion to Disney XD on 1 April 2009.

Jetix became Disney Channel in countries where it was not already available (most notably the Central Eastern Europe and the Hungarian, Czech, Slovak, Romanian, and Israeli feeds). The last main Jetix feed in operation, Jetix Russia, was rebranded to Disney Channel on 10 August 2010. Also, in the countries where Jetix Play broadcast, it became a localised version of Playhouse Disney; however, the rollout was not synchronized with the conversion of the main Jetix networks in these areas, instead happening between 2010 and 2011, one region at a time.

In Italy, the managing director of Jetix Italy, Francesco Nespega, led a management buyout; Jetix Italy was renamed as Switchover Media and was now responsible for two channels that were previously operated by Jetix Italy, cable television channel GXT and free-to-air channel K2 (as of 2024, they are operated by Warner Bros. Discovery EMEA). However, the main Jetix Italy channel remained at Disney and was rebranded as Disney XD in September 2009.

== List of versions ==
Market	Type	Formerly	(Fox Kids) launch date	Replacement	Replaced date
Canada	Block on Family Channel	Power Box	10 September 2006	discontinued	1 August 2009
United States	Block on ABC Family mornings	Unnamed children's action/adventure block (common name: ABC Family Action Block)	14 February 2004	Discontinued	31 August 2006
United States	Block on Toon Disney prime time	None	14 February 2004	Merged with Toon Disney to become Disney XD	13 February 2009
Italy	Channel	None	(April 2000) March 2005	Disney XD	September 2009
Latin America	Channel	Fox Kids	(November 1996) August 2004	Disney XD	3 July 2009
Japan	Block on Toon Disney Japan	None	December 2005	Disney XD	9 August 2009
India	Block on Toon Disney India (English)	None	16 December 2004	Jetix	2007
India	Block on STAR One; 7 to 8 pm Saturday and Sunday (Hindi)	None	2 July 2005	None	2009
India	Channel	Toon Disney India	2007	Disney XD India	14 November 2009
Central and Eastern Europe	Channel	Fox Kids	(1 April 1999) 1 January 2005	Disney Channel	19 September 2009
United Kingdom and Ireland	Channel	Fox Kids	(19 October 1996) January 2005	Disney XD	2009 fall
United Kingdom and Ireland	Block on Fox Kids	Fox Kids	April 2004	Jetix	January 2005
Netherlands	Channel	Fox Kids	13 February 2005	Disney XD	1 January 2010
France	Channel	Fox Kids	(November 1997) August 2004	Disney XD	1 April 2009
Poland	Channel	Fox Kids	(18 April 1998 ) 1 January 2005	Disney XD	18 September 2009
Poland	Block on Polsat	Fox Kids	(May 1998)	None	Discontinued
Hungary, Czech Republic and Slovakia	Channel	Fox Kids	(September 2000) 20 December 2004	Disney Channel (Hungary), Disney Channel (Czech Republic), Disney Channel Slovakia	September 2009
Hungary, Czech Republic and Slovakia	Block on Fox Kids	Fox Kids	April 2004	None	January 2005
Hungary	Block on TV2	None	(2003)	None	Discontinued
Hungary	Block on Magyar TV	None	(2000)	None	Discontinued
Scandinavia	Block	None	May 1998	None	None
Scandinavia	Channel	(12 February 1998) October 2004	Fox Kids	Disney XD	12 September 2009
Spain	Block on Minimax	(May 1998)	Fox Kids	None	Discontinued
Spain	Channel	(15 November 1998) 7 January 2005	Fox Kids	Disney XD	18 September 2009
South Korea	Block, weekdays on CHAMP	None	May 2005	None	2009
Germany	Channel	Fox Kids	(October 2000) 10 June 2005	Disney XD	October 2009
Germany	30 minute block on Saturday mornings on Kabel 1	None	30 October 2004	None	Discontinued
Turkey, Middle East and North Africa	Channel	Fox Kids	November 2000(Fox Kids); January 2005 (Jetix)	Disney XD	October 2009
Turkey	Block on Show TV	None	(2000)	None	Discontinued
Bulgaria	Block on Balkan News	None	(2000)	None	Discontinued
Bulgaria	Channel	Fox Kids	2003	Disney Channel	September 2009
Israel	Channel	Fox Kids	(February 2001) 6 March 2005	Disney Channel	9 September 2009
Greece	Channel	Fox Kids	(October 2001) January 2005	Disney XD (Greece)	2009
Russia	Channel and block on REN TV channel	Fox Kids	(1 April 1999, channel; 2001 block) 2005	Disney Channel (Russia)	10 August 2010
Vietnam	Block on VTV	None	November 2005	Discontinued	2009
Kazakhstan	Block on KTK	None	2006	Discontinued	2009

=== Other versions ===
Market	Name	Type	Formerly	Launch date	Replacement	Replaced date
Central and Eastern Europe	Jetix Play	Channel	Fox Kids Play	October 2003	Playhouse Disney	1 August 2010 (almost all countries, excepting Romania); 12 March 2011 (Romania)
India	Jetix Action Station	Block on Toon Disney weekdays (Tamil, Telugu and English)	None	December 2004	Disney XD	14 November 2009
Italy	GXT	Channel	None	May 2005	Sold	June 2009
Italy	K2	Syndicated block / channel	Fox Kids	2002/2009	Sold	June 2009
Poland	Jetix Play	Channel	Fox Kids Play	November 2003	Playhouse Disney	31 July 2010
Greece	Jetix Play	Channel	Fox Kids Play		Playhouse Disney	2010
Turkey and MENA Region	Jetix Play	Channel	Fox Kids Play	2004	Playhouse Disney	1 June 2011
United Kingdom and Ireland	Jetix Play	Channel	Fox Kids Play	1 January 2005	Discontinued	1 August 2010
United Kingdom and Ireland	Jetix +1	Timeshift service	Fox Kids +	Same as Jetix UK	Disney XD +1	Same as Jetix UK
Russia	Jetix Play	Channel	None		Discontinued	August 1, 2010
Spain	Jetix Max	Block on Jetix early evening weekday	None			
Spain	+1	Timeshift service	None	June 2006	Disney XD +1	Same as Jetix Spain
Central and Eastern Europe	Jetix Max	Block on Jetix	None			

== Programming ==
Jetix was primarily created through Disney's ownership of the Saban Entertainment library (acquired along with ABC Family Worldwide in 2001), which included shows from Marvel Productions; action-adventure shows were the primary programming theme, though not all Jetix networks and blocks were necessarily limited to that genre. Furthermore, programming from outside producers and distributors were also included.

Jetix Animation Concepts was a brand by Walt Disney Television Animation used for animation co-produced by and for the Jetix global group by the ABC Cable Networks Group.

== Magazine and other ventures ==
As part of brand extension, many of the overseas Jetix networks engaged in various marketing exercises, including print publications, awards shows and sporting events.

In the U.K., Future plc published the official Jetix Magazine; it was launched in early September 2004 by Jetix Consumer Products and Future Publishing. Cavan Scott was the magazine's initial editor. Published every four weeks, it featured puzzles and features based on the channel's shows. The magazine also came with a free DVD featuring shows from the channel.

In other countries, including Bulgaria, the Netherlands, and Romania, similar Jetix magazines were also produced.

With the purchase of the remaining Jetix Europe shares by The Walt Disney Company and the change over of the channels to a Disney branded channel, Future renamed the magazine to Nitro!, to become an independent magazine with the same general focus.

In CEE, there was annual children's awards show called Jetix Kids Awards, in which children could vote their favorite shows and stars, in order to win prizes. The last edition took place in 2008.

The Jetix Kids Cup (formerly known as the Fox Kids Cup) was an association football tournament in which children from 16 countries competed to "promote fair play, sportsmanship and cultural exchange".

== See also ==
- List of Disney TV programming blocks
- List of programs broadcast by Disney XD
- List of programs broadcast by Toon Disney
- List of programs broadcast by Fox Kids
