= 2001–02 United States network television schedule (daytime) =

The following is the 2001–02 daytime network television schedule for the six major English-language commercial broadcast networks in the United States in operation during that television season. It covers the weekday daytime hours from September 2001 to August 2002. The schedule is followed by a list per network of returning series, new series, and series canceled after the 2000–01 season.

Affiliates fill time periods not occupied by network programs with local or syndicated programming. PBS – which offers daytime programming through a children's program block, PBS Kids – is not included, as its member television stations have local flexibility over most of their schedules and broadcast times for network shows may vary. Also not included are stations affiliated with Pax TV, as its schedule is composed mainly of syndicated reruns although it also carried some first-run programs.

The September 11 attacks hindered the ability to start airing daytime programming in a timely manner.

== Legend ==
- Light yellow indicates talk shows.
- Green indicates soap operas.
- Pink indicates game shows.
- Gold indicates news programming.
- White indicates local programming.
- Gray indicates encore programming (e.g., reruns of prime-time programming).
- Light teal indicates sporting events.
- Light purple indicates children's programming.
- New series are highlighted in **bold**.

== Schedule ==
- All times correspond to U.S. Eastern and Pacific Time scheduling (except for some live sports or events). Except where affiliates slot certain programs outside their network-dictated timeslots, subtract one hour for Central, Mountain, Alaska, and Hawaii-Aleutian times.
- Local schedules may differ, as affiliates have the option to pre-empt or delay network programs. Such scheduling may be limited to preemptions caused by local or national breaking news or weather coverage (which may force stations to tape delay certain programs in overnight timeslots or defer them to a co-operated or other contracted station in their regular timeslot) and any major sports events scheduled to air in a weekday timeslot (mainly during major holidays). Stations may air shows at other times at their preference.

=== Monday-Friday ===
Network		7:00 am	7:30 am	8:00 am	8:30 am	9:00 am	9:30 am	10:00 am	10:30 am	11:00 am	11:30 am	noon	12:30 pm	1:00 pm	1:30 pm	2:00 pm	2:30 pm	3:00 pm	3:30 pm	4:00 pm	4:30 pm	5:00 pm	5:30 pm	6:00 pm	6:30 pm
ABC		Good Morning America				Local and/or syndicated programming				The View		Local and/or syndicated programming	Port Charles	All My Children		One Life to Live		General Hospital		Local and/or syndicated programming					ABC World News Tonight with Peter Jennings
CBS		The Early Show				Local and/or syndicated programming				The Price Is Right		Local and/or syndicated programming	The Young and the Restless		The Bold and the Beautiful	As the World Turns		Guiding Light		Local and/or syndicated programming					CBS Evening News with Dan Rather
NBC		Today						Local and/or syndicated programming						Days of Our Lives		Passions		Local and/or syndicated programming							NBC Nightly News with Tom Brokaw
Fox^{†}	Fall	The Magic School Bus	Local and/or syndicated programming															Life with Louie (Mon.); The New Woody Woodpecker Show (Tue.-Thu.); Action Man (Fri.)	**Transformers: Robots in Disguise**	Power Rangers Time Force	Digimon: Digital Monsters	Local and/or syndicated programming			
Fox^{†}	Winter	The Magic School Bus	Local and/or syndicated programming																						
UPN		Recess	**The Legend of Tarzan**	Buzz Lightyear of Star Command	Sabrina: The Animated Series	Local and/or syndicated programming																			
The WB	Fall	Local and/or syndicated programming																**Sailor Moon**	Pokémon	Pokémon	Batman Beyond	Local and/or syndicated programming			
The WB	Mid-September	Local and/or syndicated programming																Cardcaptors (Mon.-Tue.; Thu.-Fri.); Rescue Heroes: Global Response Team (Wed.)	Pokémon	Pokémon	Jackie Chan Adventures	Local and/or syndicated programming			
The WB	October	Local and/or syndicated programming																Pokémon (Mon.-Tue.; Thu.-Fri.); Rescue Heroes: Global Response Team (Wed.)	X-Men: Evolution	Pokémon	Jackie Chan Adventures	Local and/or syndicated programming			
The WB	December	Local and/or syndicated programming																Pokémon (Mon.-Tue.; Thu.-Fri.); Rescue Heroes: Global Response Team (Wed.)	Cardcaptors	Pokémon	Jackie Chan Adventures	Local and/or syndicated programming			
The WB	January	Local and/or syndicated programming																Pokémon (Mon.-Tue.; Thu.-Fri.); Rescue Heroes: Global Response Team (Wed.)	**Scooby-Doo**	Pokémon	Jackie Chan Adventures	Local and/or syndicated programming			
The WB	April	Local and/or syndicated programming																Scooby-Doo (Mon.-Tue.; Thu.-Fri.); Rescue Heroes: Global Response Team (Wed.)	Yu-Gi-Oh!	Pokémon	Jackie Chan Adventures	Local and/or syndicated programming			
The WB	May	Local and/or syndicated programming																Scooby-Doo (Mon.-Tue.; Thu.-Fri.); Rescue Heroes: Global Response Team (Wed.)	Yu-Gi-Oh!	Pokémon	**The Powerpuff Girls**	Local and/or syndicated programming			
The WB	July	Local and/or syndicated programming																Scooby-Doo (Mon.-Tue.; Thu.-Fri.); Rescue Heroes: Global Response Team (Wed.)	Jackie Chan Adventures	Pokémon	Yu-Gi-Oh!	Local and/or syndicated programming			

=== Notes ===
- † Fox returned its daytime programming hours back to its affiliates when Fox Kids ended its weekday block in December 2001. Many Fox affiliates preempted kids programming in daytime or deferred it to other television stations, opting to air syndicated programs or local news instead.
- On September 11, 2001, all six major networks suspended their daytime programing due to live coverage of the September 11 attacks. Daytime programming resumed for Fox and The WB on September 12, while the Big Three networks resumed their regular daytime programs during the week of September 17. UPN, which did not carry any daytime programming at the time, resumed normal programming on September 13.

=== Saturday ===
Network		7:00 am	7:30 am	8:00 am	8:30 am	9:00 am	9:30 am	10:00 am	10:30 am	11:00 am	11:30 am	noon	12:30 pm	1:00 pm	1:30 pm	2:00 pm	2:30 pm	3:00 pm	3:30 pm	4:00 pm	4:30 pm	5:00 pm	5:30 pm	6:00 pm	6:30 pm
ABC	Fall	Local and/or syndicated programming		House of Mouse	The New Adventures of Winnie the Pooh	Teacher's Pet	Lloyd in Space	Recess		**Lizzie McGuire**	**Even Stevens**	Sabrina: The Animated Series	The Weekenders	College Football on ABC											
ABC	October	Local and/or syndicated programming		Teacher's Pet	Lloyd in Space	Recess		Lizzie McGuire	Even Stevens	**Mary-Kate and Ashley in Action!**	The Weekenders	The New Adventures of Winnie the Pooh	House of Mouse	College Football on ABC											
ABC	December	Local and/or syndicated programming		Mary-Kate and Ashley in Action!	Teacher's Pet	Recess		Lizzie McGuire	Even Stevens	Lloyd in Space	The Weekenders	The New Adventures of Winnie the Pooh	House of Mouse	ABC Sports and/or local programming				ABC Sports programming						Local news	ABC World News Saturday
ABC	Winter	Local and/or syndicated programming		Mary-Kate and Ashley in Action!	Teacher's Pet	Recess		Lizzie McGuire	Even Stevens	Lloyd in Space	**Teamo Supremo**	The New Adventures of Winnie the Pooh	House of Mouse	ABC Sports and/or local programming				ABC Sports programming						Local news	ABC World News Saturday
ABC	Spring	Local and/or syndicated programming		Mary-Kate and Ashley in Action!	Teacher's Pet	Recess		Lizzie McGuire	Even Stevens	Teamo Supremo	Lloyd in Space	The New Adventures of Winnie the Pooh	House of Mouse	ABC Sports and/or local programming				ABC Sports programming						Local news	ABC World News Saturday
ABC	August	Local and/or syndicated programming		Teamo Supremo	Teacher's Pet	Recess		Lizzie McGuire	Even Stevens	Teamo Supremo	Lloyd in Space	The New Adventures of Winnie the Pooh	House of Mouse	ABC Sports and/or local programming				ABC Sports programming						Local news	ABC World News Saturday
CBS	Fall	**Oswald**	Dora the Explorer	Blue's Clues	Little Bill	The Saturday Early Show				Franklin	**Bob the Builder**	SEC on CBS													
CBS	December	Bob the Builder	Dora the Explorer	Blue's Clues	Little Bill	The Saturday Early Show				Franklin	Oswald	CBS Sports and/or local programming						CBS Sports programming						Local news	CBS Evening News
NBC	Fall	Local and/or syndicated programming		Today				City Guys	All About Us	Just Deal	**Sk8**	City Guys	NBA Inside Stuff	NBC Sports and/or local programming				NBC Sports programming						Local news	NBC Nightly News
NBC	Winter	Local and/or syndicated programming		Today				City Guys	All About Us	Just Deal	City Guys	Sk8	NBA Inside Stuff	NBC Sports and/or local programming				NBC Sports programming						Local news	NBC Nightly News
Fox	Fall	Local and/or syndicated programming		**Transformers: Robots in Disguise**	Power Rangers Time Force	Digimon: Digital Monsters	**Medabots**	**Moolah Beach**	Digimon: Digital Monsters	**The Ripping Friends**	**Alienators: Evolution Continues**	Fox Sports and/or local programming													
Fox	October	Local and/or syndicated programming		**Transformers: Robots in Disguise**	Power Rangers Time Force	Digimon: Digital Monsters	**Medabots**	The Ripping Friends	Digimon: Digital Monsters	**Mon Colle Knights**	**Alienators: Evolution Continues**	Fox Sports and/or local programming													
Fox	February	Local and/or syndicated programming		**Transformers: Robots in Disguise**	**Power Rangers Wild Force**	Digimon: Digital Monsters	**Galidor: Defenders of the Outer Dimension**	Medabots	Digimon: Digital Monsters	**Mon Colle Knights**	**Alienators: Evolution Continues**	Fox Sports and/or local programming													
Fox	March	Local and/or syndicated programming		Galidor: Defenders of the Outer Dimension	**Power Rangers Wild Force**	Digimon: Digital Monsters	Medabots	Digimon: Digital Monsters	Transformers: Robots in Disguise	**Mon Colle Knights**	**Alienators: Evolution Continues**	Fox Sports and/or local programming													
Fox	May	Local and/or syndicated programming		The New Woody Woodpecker Show	**Power Rangers Wild Force**	Galidor: Defenders of the Outer Dimension	Digimon: Digital Monsters	Medabots	Digimon: Digital Monsters	Transformers: Robots in Disguise	Mon Colle Knights	Local and/or syndicated programming	This Week in Baseball	Fox Sports and/or local programming											
The WB	Fall	Local and/or syndicated programming		Pokémon	Cubix: Robots for Everyone	Jackie Chan Adventures	**The Mummy**	Pokémon	X-Men: Evolution	**The Nightmare Room**	**Yu-Gi-Oh!**	Local and/or syndicated programming													
The WB	January	Local and/or syndicated programming		Cubix: Robots for Everyone	Static Shock	Jackie Chan Adventures	**The Mummy**	Pokémon	X-Men: Evolution	**The Nightmare Room**	**Yu-Gi-Oh!**	Local and/or syndicated programming													
The WB	March	Local and/or syndicated programming		X-Men: Evolution	Static Shock	Jackie Chan Adventures	The Zeta Project	Pokémon	X-Men: Evolution	The Mummy	**Yu-Gi-Oh!**	Local and/or syndicated programming													
The WB	June	Local and/or syndicated programming		Rescue Heroes: Global Response Team	Static Shock	Jackie Chan Adventures	**The Powerpuff Girls**	Pokémon	Yu-Gi-Oh!	X-Men: Evolution	**Phantom Investigators**	Local and/or syndicated programming													
The WB	July	Local and/or syndicated programming		The Zeta Project	Static Shock	Jackie Chan Adventures	Jackie Chan Adventures	Pokémon	Yu-Gi-Oh!	Yu-Gi-Oh!	X-Men: Evolution	Local and/or syndicated programming													

=== Sunday ===
Network		7:00 am	7:30 am	8:00 am	8:30 am	9:00 am	9:30 am	10:00 am	10:30 am	11:00 am	11:30 am	noon	12:30 pm	1:00 pm	1:30 pm	2:00 pm	2:30 pm	3:00 pm	3:30 pm	4:00 pm	4:30 pm	5:00 pm	5:30 pm	6:00 pm	6:30 pm
ABC		Local and/or syndicated programming						This Week with Sam & Cokie		ABC Sports and/or local programming														Local news	ABC World News Sunday
CBS	Fall	Local and/or syndicated programming				CBS News Sunday Morning			Face the Nation	Local and/or syndicated programming		NFL Today		NFL on CBS											
CBS	Mid-winter	Local and/or syndicated programming				CBS News Sunday Morning			Face the Nation	Local and/or syndicated programming		CBS Sports and/or local programming												Local news	CBS Evening News
NBC		Local and/or syndicated programming		Today		Meet the Press		Local and/or syndicated programming				NBC Sports and/or local programming												Local news	NBC Nightly News
Fox	Fall	Local and/or syndicated programming				Fox News Sunday		Local and/or syndicated programming				Fox NFL Sunday		Fox NFL (and sometimes another Fox Sports event and/or local programming)											
Fox	Mid-winter	Local and/or syndicated programming				Fox News Sunday		Local and/or syndicated programming				Fox Sports and/or local programming												Local and/or syndicated programming	
UPN		The Weekenders	Recess	**The Legend of Tarzan**	Buzz Lightyear of Star Command	Local and/or syndicated programming																			

== By network ==
=== ABC ===
Returning series:

- ABC World News Tonight with Peter Jennings
- All My Children
- Disney's One Saturday Morning
  - House of Mouse
  - Lloyd in Space
  - The New Adventures of Winnie the Pooh (reruns)
  - Recess
  - Sabrina: The Animated Series
  - Teacher's Pet
  - The Weekenders
- General Hospital
- Good Morning America
- One Life to Live
- Port Charles
- This Week with Sam & Cokie
- The View

New series:

- Disney's One Saturday Morning
  - **Even Stevens**
  - **Lizzie McGuire**
  - **Mary-Kate and Ashley in Action!**
  - **Teamo Supremo**

Not returning from 2000–01:

- Disney's One Saturday Morning
  - Buzz Lightyear of Star Command
  - Doug (reruns)
  - Mickey Mouse Works
  - Pepper Ann

=== CBS ===
Returning series:

- As the World Turns
- The Bold and the Beautiful
- The Early Show
- CBS Evening News with Dan Rather
- CBS News Sunday Morning
- Face the Nation
- Guiding Light
- The Price is Right
- The Saturday Early Show
- The Young and the Restless
- Nick Jr. on CBS
  - Blue's Clues
  - Dora the Explorer
  - Franklin
  - Little Bill

New series:

- Nick Jr. on CBS
  - **Bob the Builder**
  - **Oswald**

Not returning from 2000–01:

- Nick Jr. on CBS
  - Kipper
  - Little Bear

=== NBC ===
Returning series:

- Days of Our Lives
- Meet the Press
- NBC Nightly News with Tom Brokaw
- Passions
- Today with Katie Couric and Matt Lauer
- TNBC
  - All About Us
  - City Guys
  - Just Deal
  - NBA Inside Stuff

New series:

- TNBC
  - **Sk8**

Not returning from 2000–01:

- TNBC
  - Hang Time
  - One World

=== Fox ===
Returning series:

- Fox Kids
  - Action Man
  - Digimon: Digital Monsters
  - Life with Louie (reruns)
  - The Magic School Bus (reruns)
  - The New Woody Woodpecker Show
  - Power Rangers Time Force
- Fox News Sunday
- This Week in Baseball

New series:

- Fox Kids
  - **Alienators: Evolution Continues**
  - **Galidor: Defenders of the Outer Dimension**
  - **Medabots**
  - **Mon Colle Knights**
  - **Moolah Beach**
  - **Power Rangers Wild Force**
  - **The Ripping Friends**
  - **Transformers: Robots in Disguise**

Not returning from 2000–01:

- Fox Kids
  - Beast Machines: Transformers
  - Big Guy and Rusty the Boy Robot
  - Cybersix (from fall 1999)
  - Dinozaurs
  - Dungeons & Dragons
  - Escaflowne
  - Flint the Time Detective
  - Kong: The Animated Series
  - Los Luchadores
  - NASCAR Racers
  - Power Rangers Lightspeed Rescue
  - Real Scary Stories
  - Roswell Conspiracies
  - Spider-Man Unlimited
  - X-Men (reruns)
  - The Zack Files

=== UPN ===
Returning series:

- Disney's One Too
  - Buzz Lightyear of Star Command
  - Recess
  - Sabrina: The Animated Series

New series:

- Disney's One Too
  - **The Legend of Tarzan**
  - The Weekenders

Not returning from 2000–01:

- Disney's One Too
  - Pepper Ann

=== The WB ===
Returning series:

- Kids WB!
  - Batman Beyond
  - Cardcaptors
  - Cubix: Robots for Everyone
  - Jackie Chan Adventures
  - Pokémon: Johto League Champions
  - Rescue Heroes: Global Response Team
  - Static Shock
  - X-Men: Evolution
  - The Zeta Project

New series:

- Kids WB!
  - **The Mummy**
  - **The Nightmare Room**
  - **Phantom Investigators**
  - **The Powerpuff Girls**
  - **Sailor Moon**
  - **Scooby-Doo**
  - **Yu-Gi-Oh!**

Not returning from 2000–01:

- Kids WB!
  - Detention
  - Dragon Ball Z
  - Generation O!
  - Histeria!
  - Max Steel
  - Men in Black: The Series
  - The Sylvester & Tweety Mysteries

== See also ==
- 2001–02 United States network television schedule (prime-time)
- 2001–02 United States network television schedule (late night)

== Sources ==
- https://web.archive.org/web/20071015122215/http://curtalliaume.com/abc_day.html
- https://web.archive.org/web/20071015122235/http://curtalliaume.com/cbs_day.html
- https://web.archive.org/web/20071012211242/http://curtalliaume.com/nbc_day.html
- Aaron Greenhouse (October 16, 2001). "UPN Kids Broadcast Schedule". Carnegie Mellon University.
