= List of Pepper Ann episodes =

Pepper Ann is an American animated television series produced by Walt Disney Television Animation.

== Series overview ==
Season	Segments (Note: Segment count reflects broadcast; production totals are noted separately.)	Episodes		Originally released		
Season	Segments	Episodes		First released	Last released	Network
1	23	13		September 13, 1997	January 24, 1998	ABC (Disney's One Saturday Morning)
2	25	13		September 12, 1998	January 16, 1999	ABC (Disney's One Saturday Morning)
3	14	26	8	September 11, 1999	January 22, 2000	ABC (Disney's One Saturday Morning)
3	28 (Note: 42 segments total; segments split up per channel.)	26	18	February 6, 2000	February 27, 2000	UPN (Disney's One Too)
4	9	13	5	September 9, 2000	January 6, 2001	ABC
4	5	13	3	November 5, 2000	November 12, 2000	UPN
4	9 (Note: 23 segments total; segments split up per channel.)	13	7 (Note: Disney Channel aired the series in packaging order; 4 miscellaneous segments (whose sister segments were repackaged for ABC or UPN) premiered on the channel, alongside 3 unaired episodes.)	November 15, 2001	November 30, 2001	Disney Channel (Note: First previewed on Toon Disney in syndication, although the premiere dates for said channel are undocumented.)

== Episodes ==
=== Season 1 (1997–98) ===
The first season of Pepper Ann consists of 13 episodes (23 segments). Due to crediting inconsistencies, the episodes are ordered below by their package order (as featured on Disney+) and not their original broadcast order.

Note: All episodes in this season were directed by Sherie Pollack.

No. overall	No. in season	Title	Animation director(s)	Written by	Storyboard by	Original release date	Prod. code	Packaging code
1	1	"Ziterella"	Daniel De La Vega & Joanna Romersa	Mirith J.S. Colao	Perry Kiefer & Chuck Klein	September 13, 1997	4346-001	ABC-101 UPN-19
On the week of yearbook photo day, seventh grader Pepper Ann Pearson gets her first pimple and must choose between her looks and her dignity when her mother tells her to go to Abe's Mall (referred to as the "Abys-Mal") to buy pimple cream. Meanwhile, Hazelnut Middle School principal Mr. Hickey tries to find a replacement photographer after the current one gets conjunctivitis from infected nerd, Pink-Eye Pete.
2	2	"Romeo + Juliet" (Note: Working title: "Romeo & Juliet".)	Cullen Blaine & Rick Leon	Matthew Negrete & Nahnatchka Khan	Suraiya Daud, Fred Gonzales & Perry Kiefer	September 20, 1997	4346-002	ABC-102 (Note: "Nicky Gone Bad" and "Romeo + Juliet" were paired for ABC-108.) UPN-20
2	2	"Food Barn"	Cullen Blaine & Rick Leon	Laura McCreary	Suraiya Daud, Fred Gonzales & Perry Kiefer	September 20, 1997	4346-003	ABC-102 UPN-20
"Romeo + Juliet": The school's drama club is producing the play "Romeo and Juliet. At first Pepper Ann thinks it's the lamest thing ever, but when she finds out that Craig Bean (an eighth grader with whom she is infatuated) is playing Romeo, she goes after the role as Juliet, but ends up playing Juliet's nurse. "Food Barn": Milo and Pepper Ann are assigned to work at a Costco-esque supermarket called Food Barn as part of their economics class, where Milo is favored over Pepper Ann by their boss, Bob.
3	3	"Old Best Friend"	Daniel De La Vega, Eddy Houchins & Joanna Romersa	Mirith J.S. Colao	Shawna Cha & Wendy Grieb	September 27, 1997	4346-005	ABC-103 UPN-43
3	3	"Crunch Pod"	Daniel De La Vega, Eddy Houchins & Joanna Romersa	David Hemingson	Shawna Cha & Wendy Grieb	September 27, 1997	4346-004	ABC-103 UPN-43
"Old Best Friend": Pepper Anns old best friend Brenda visits, but P.A. realizes that her old best friend is very annoying and possessive. "Crunch Pod": When Pepper Ann inadvertently beats Milo's high score on a video game, Milo becomes jealous and challenges Pepper Ann to a rematch.
4	4	"Psychic Moose"	Eddy Houchins, Rick Leon & Joanna Romersa	Laura McCreary	Suraiya Daud & Wendy Grieb	October 4, 1997	4346-007	ABC-104 UPN-21
4	4	"Doll + Chain" (Note: Working title: "Doll & Chain".)	Eddy Houchins, Rick Leon & Joanna Romersa	Mirith J.S. Colao	Suraiya Daud & Wendy Grieb	October 4, 1997	4346-010	ABC-104 UPN-21
"Psychic Moose": Pepper Ann starts spending time with her sister Moose when she mistakenly believes she is clairvoyant. "Doll + Chain": Pepper Ann learns a lesson in responsibility when she's assigned to care for a plastic baby doll as part of a school project.
5	5	"Megablades of Grass"	Cullen Blaine & Joanna Romersa	Scott M. Gimple	Lyndon Ruddy & Fred Gonzales	October 11, 1997	4346-009	ABC-105 UPN-22
5	5	"Family Vacation"	Cullen Blaine & Joanna Romersa	David Hemingson	Lyndon Ruddy & Fred Gonzales	October 11, 1997	4346-015	ABC-105 UPN-22
"Megablades of Grass": Pepper Ann must earn her own money for a new pair of rollerblades, but finds work too tedious, so she exploits Milo's talent for creating freshly mown art for cash. "Family Vacation": The Pearson family takes a vacation, but between the lame car drive and Moose's neurotic friend, Crash, Pepper Ann wishes she could go on her own vacation.
6	6	"Sani-Paper"	Richard Bowman, Eddy Houchins & Rick Leon	David Hemingson	Shawna Cha, Perry Kiefer & Bob Logan	October 18, 1997	4346-011	ABC-106 UPN-42 (Note: UPN/Disney schedules swap the episodes segment order in guides.)
6	6	"The Big Pencil" (Note: Working title: "She Blinded Me with Science".)	Richard Bowman, Eddy Houchins & Rick Leon	Mirith J.S. Colao, David Hemingson, Nahnatchka Khan & Sue Rose	Shawna Cha, Perry Kiefer & Bob Logan	October 18, 1997	4346-013	ABC-106 UPN-42
"Sani-Paper": On a field trip to a toilet cover factory, Pepper Ann and Milo (who's extremely thirsty) go undercover when Pepper Ann suspects the company of being corrupt. "The Big Pencil": Pepper Ann vows to beat perennial Science Fair rival, Alice Kane, once and for all.
7	7	"Uniform, Uniformity"	Cullen Blaine & Rick Leon	Laura McCreary	Suraiya Daud & Gilbert Weems Jr.	October 25, 1997	4346-014	ABC-107 UPN-23
7	7	"Snot Your Mother's Music"	Cullen Blaine & Rick Leon	Roger Reitzel	Suraiya Daud & Gilbert Weems Jr.	October 25, 1997	4346-008	ABC-107 UPN-23
"Uniform, Uniformity": Hazelnut Middle School enforces a uniforms-only dress code, and Lydia is hired to design them, which doesn't sit well with Pepper Ann. "Snot Your Mother's Music": Pepper Ann is shocked to discover that Mick Snot, her favorite rock star, is friends with her mother -- and more shocked when Mick Snot comes to stay at the Pearsons and is a different man when he's not onstage.
8 (Note: Listed as Episode 9 on Disney+)	8	"In Support of" (Note: Also titled "In Support Of" in episode guides.)	Eddy Houchins & Joanna Romersa	Matthew Negrete & Nahnatchka Khan	Chuck Klein, Gilbert Weems Jr. & Wendy Grieb	January 24, 1998 (Note: "In Support of" was intended to air alongside "Nicky Gone Bad" but was pulled due to standards and practices issues.)	4346-012	ABC-108 (Note: "In Support of" and "Crush + Burn" were paired for ABC-114.) UPN-24
8	8	"Nicky Gone Bad"	Eddy Houchins & Joanna Romersa	Mirith J.S. Colao	Chuck Klein, Gilbert Weems Jr. & Wendy Grieb	November 1, 1997	4346-019	ABC-108 UPN-24
"In Support of": When Coach Doogan announces that the next gym class will focus on the trampoline and that the girls need a support, Pepper Ann takes it as a sign that she needs a bra and must endure a humiliating day of bra-shopping with her mom and sister. Note: This segment was rerun scarcely on ABC due to its suggestive humor. The episode was aired in regular rotation on UPN and Toon Disney, and is also available to stream on Disney+. "Nicky Gone Bad": Fed up with her friends taking her for granted and being seen as a goody-goody, Nicky becomes a bad girl known as Nic'kay, but Pepper Ann worries that her friend's new attitude will lead to a life of ruin.
9 (Note: Listed as Episode 8 on Disney+)	9	"The Environ-Mentals" (Note: Working title: "Environ-Mentals".)	Dainiel De La Vega & Joanna Romersa	Matthew Negrete & Nahnatchka Khan	Perry Kiefer, Chuck Klein & Lyndon Ruddy	November 8, 1997	4346-017	ABC-109 UPN-25
Pepper Ann tries to make the Clean Up Lupkin Park talent show the coolest event of the year, while trying to hide an embarrassing family tradition. Meanwhile, Milo's art is ostracized by everyone in town and Lydia imposes on her younger sister, Janie's, plans to make "Clean Up Lupkin Park" the best it's ever been.
10	10	"Soccer Season"	Richard Bowman & Rick Leon	David Hemingson	Wendy Grieb & Fred Gonzales	November 15, 1997	4346-020	ABC-110 UPN-26
10	10	"Crush + Burn" (Note: Working title: "Crush & Burn".)	Richard Bowman & Rick Leon	Mirith J.S. Colao	Wendy Grieb & Fred Gonzales	November 15, 1997	4346-016	ABC-110 UPN-26
"Soccer Season": Pepper Ann lets fame go to her head when she becomes the star player in the school soccer team. "Crush + Burn": Pepper Ann lies to Milo's insane crush, Gwen Mezzrow, about being his girlfriend -- which turns into a tangled web of deceit involving everyone in school.
11	11	"Thanksgiving Dad"	Daniel De La Vega & Joanna Romersa	Matthew Negrete & Nahnatchka Khan	Perry Kiefer & Chuck Klein	November 22, 1997	4346-006	ABC-111 UPN-27
Lydia and Janie make every effort to make their Thanksgiving dinner a success, while Pepper Ann thinks her divorced father, Chuck, will come to visit instead of calling like he usually does.
12 (Note: Listed as Episode 13 on Disney+)	12	"Sketch 22"	Richard Bowman & Joanna Romersa	Laura McCreary	Suraiya Daud & Perry Kiefer	January 10, 1998	4346-018	ABC-112 UPN-28
12	12	"Manly Milo"	Richard Bowman & Joanna Romersa	Laura McCreary	Suraiya Daud & Perry Kiefer	January 10, 1998	4346-022	ABC-112 UPN-28
"Sketch 22": Pepper Ann is mistaken for an eighth grader by a band of cool eighth grade girls. "Manly Milo": A distressed Milo turns to Pepper Ann for help in becoming more manly after realizing that spending time with girls has made him a laughingstock among his male peers.
13 (Note: Listed as Episode 12 on Disney+)	13	"Have You Ever Been Unsupervised" (Note: Working title: "Have You Ever Been Unsupervised?".)	Daniel De La Vega & Mitch Rochon	Matthew Negrete & Nahnatchka Khan	Fred Gonzales, Lyndon Ruddy & Wendy Grieb	January 17, 1998	4346-021	ABC-113 UPN-44
13	13	"The Unusual Suspects" (Note: Working title: "Unusual Suspects".)	Daniel De La Vega & Mitch Rochon	Mirith J.S. Colao	Fred Gonzales, Lyndon Ruddy & Wendy Grieb	January 17, 1998	4346-023	ABC-113 UPN-44
"Have You Ever Been Unsupervised": Pepper Ann freaks out when she's invited to Dieter's unsupervised 13th birthday party, where Dieter plans to play Spin the Bottle. "The Unusual Suspects": In this parody of hardboiled detective stories and the film The Usual Suspects, the Hazelnut Middle School Otter Statue is stolen, and Principal Hickey calls up Pepper Ann and four suspects to find out the truth.

=== Season 2 (1998–99) ===
The second season of Pepper Ann consists of 13 episodes (25 segments). Due to crediting inconsistencies, the episodes are ordered below by their package order (as featured on Disney+) and not their original broadcast order.

Note: Starting with this season, the series switched to digital ink and paint, and all episodes were directed by Brad Goodchild.

No. overall	No. in season	Title	Animation director(s)	Written by	Storyboard by	Original release date	Prod. code	Packaging code
14	1	"Quiz Bowl"	Joan Drake, Will Knoll, Terrence Lennon & Joanna Romersa	Laura McCreary	Stephanie Gladden, Perry Kiefer, Elaine Hultgren & Fred Gonzales	September 12, 1998	4346-101	ABC-201 UPN-29
14	1	"License to Drive"	Joan Drake, Will Knoll, Terrence Lennon & Joanna Romersa	Matthew Negrete & Nahnatchka Khan	Stephanie Gladden, Perry Kiefer, Elaine Hultgren & Fred Gonzales	September 12, 1998	4346-104	ABC-201 UPN-29
"Quiz Bowl": Pepper Ann is chosen to be an alternate for the school's Quiz Bowl team and sees it as a chance to goof off and travel for free, but when Nicky falls ill due to stage fright, Pepper Ann must cram to lead the school to victory. "License to Drive": Pepper Ann kisses up to her slacker cousin Ned who may be getting a "set of wheels" for his 16th birthday so Pepper Ann can get street cred for being driven to school by a high schooler.
15	2	"Cocoon Gables"	Richard Bowman & Rick Leon	Matthew Negrete & Nahnatchka Khan	Lyndon Ruddy & Gilbert Weems Jr.	September 19, 1998	4346-102	ABC-202 UPN-36
15	2	"Green-Eyed Monster"	Richard Bowman & Rick Leon	Madellaine Paxson	Lyndon Ruddy & Gilbert Weems Jr.	September 19, 1998	4346-103	ABC-202 UPN-36
"Cocoon Gables": Pepper Ann is assigned to volunteer at Cocoon Gables, a retirement home, and learns a lesson in age discrimination and respecting ones elders. "Green-Eyed Monster": Pepper Ann becomes jealous when her chance at being the most popular girl in school is usurped by a new girl named Amber O'Malley. Meanwhile, Principal Hickey investigates a string of locker thefts.
16	3	"Hazelnut's Finest"	Richard Bowman & Joanna Romersa	Sean Whalen	Fred Gonzales & Wendy Grieb	September 26, 1998	4346-106	ABC-203 UPN-30
16	3	"Cat Scan"	Richard Bowman & Joanna Romersa	Mirith J.S. Colao & Laura McCreary	Fred Gonzales & Wendy Grieb	September 26, 1998	4346-105	ABC-203 UPN-30
"Hazelnut's Finest": Pepper Ann is assigned to document her Uncle Jo Jo's day of working as a cop, but becomes disillusioned when it's not as gritty and exciting as she thinks. "Cat Scan": Just when Pepper Ann finally gets around to renewing her pet cat, Steve the Cat's, license, he runs off and becomes a mascot for a local lottery show.
17	4	"An Otterbiography"	Richard Bowman & Rick Leon	Scott M. Gimple	Jim Caswell & Wendy Grieb	October 3, 1998	4346-107	ABC-204 UPN-37
17	4	"Greensleeves"	Richard Bowman & Rick Leon	Matthew Negrete & Nahnatchka Khan	Jim Caswell & Wendy Grieb	October 3, 1998	4346-110	ABC-204 UPN-37
"An Otterbiography": Pepper Ann is chosen as the newest wearer of the Shania the Otter mascot costume, which is embarrassing at first, but finds that she can talk to her crush Craig when she's dressed as Shania. "Greensleeves": Pepper Ann wants to become a piano virtuoso, but her skills are terrible, so she uses a light-up keyboard to pretend to be talented.
18	5	"Vanessa Less Tessa"	Rick Leon, Mircea Mannta & Howie Parkins	Laura McCreary	Lyndon Ruddy & Gilbert Weems Jr.	October 10, 1998	4346-112	ABC-205 UPN-38
18	5	"Peer Counselor P.A."	Rick Leon, Mircea Mannta & Howie Parkins	Madellaine Paxson	Lyndon Ruddy & Gilbert Weems Jr.	October 10, 1998	4346-113	ABC-205 UPN-38
"Vanessa Less Tessa": Pepper Ann uses what she learned from her favorite sitcom Crazy Twin Shenanigans to get Vanessa to reconcile with her sister, Tessa. "Peer Counselor P.A.": Pepper Ann's short attention span gets her in trouble when she signs up for peer counseling under the assumption that it's a vacation to a pier-side carnival, and her attempt at being a better listener leads Dieter to run away from home.
19	6	"A 'Tween Halloween"	Joanna Romersa	Scott M. Gimple	Fred Gonzales, Lyndon Ruddy & Llyn Hunter	October 31, 1998	4346-111	ABC-206 UPN-31
19	6	"Mash into Me"	Joanna Romersa	Matthew Negrete & Nahnatchaka Khan	Fred Gonzales, Lyndon Ruddy & Llyn Hunter	October 31, 1998	4346-117	ABC-206 UPN-31
"A 'Tween Halloween": Pepper Ann becomes ashamed of trick-or-treating as a preteen after being told by a little kid that she's too old to do it. "Mash into Me": Mooses friend, Crash, begins harassing Pepper Ann after he finds out that she looks just like his favorite superheroine.
20	7	"Framed"	Richard Bowman & Rick Leon	Eve Ahlert & Dennis Drake	John Nevarez, Gilbert Weems Jr. & Fred Gonzales	December 5, 1998	4346-118	ABC-207 UPN-32
20	7	"Radio Freak Hazelnut"	Richard Bowman & Rick Leon	Scott M. Gimple	John Nevarez, Gilbert Weems Jr. & Fred Gonzales	November 7, 1998 (Note: "Radio Freak Hazelnut" initially aired with a repeat episode separate from its sister segment, albeit it was preempted by a report of the STS-95 space shuttle mission.)	4346-119	ABC-207 UPN-32
"Framed": Pepper Ann is accused of spray-painting the word "Hare" on every building in the town. "Radio Freak Hazelnut": Pepper Ann stumbles upon a pirate radio show run by a student named Wayne Macabre, who trashes everything Pepper Ann loves.
21	8	"Presenting Stuart Walldinger" (Note: Mistitled "Presenting Stewart Walldinger" in episode's opening.)	Will Knoll & Rick Leon	Laura McCreary	Fred Gonzales & Gilbert Weems Jr.	November 14, 1998	4346-108	ABC-208 UPN-33
21	8	"P.A.'s Life in a Nutshell"	Will Knoll & Rick Leon	Scott M. Gimple	Fred Gonzales & Gilbert Weems Jr.	November 14, 1998	4346-116	ABC-208 UPN-33
"Presenting Stuart Walldinger": Pepper Ann adamantly objects to Nicky bringing Stuart as her date to Sketch's party, believing his un-coolness will ruin the party. "P.A.'s Life in a Nutshell": Pepper Ann sneaks out to attend the Springtime Late Night Flashback Bash after Lydia prohibits her to go -- and things get worse when Pepper Ann writes about the experience in a zine run by Milo and Stuart.
22	9	"Like Riding a Bike"	Richard Bowman & Joanna Romersa	Matthew Negrete & Nahnatchka Khan	Elaine Hultgren & Robert Souza	November 28, 1998	4346-114	ABC-209 UPN-35
Half-hour episode. Pepper Ann is horrified when Lydia befriends Mr. Carter and fears that the friendship will turn into romance. Meanwhile, Nicky has cold feet about being Stuart's girlfriend, and Milo deals with his on-again, off-again crush Gwen, who also oscillates between loving him and hating him.
23	10	"Portrait of the Artist as a Young Milo"	Richard Bowman & Mircea Mannta	Matthew Negrete & Nahnatchka Khan	Fred Gonzales & Elaine Hultgren	December 12, 1998	4346-120	ABC-210 UPN-40
23	10	"The Sisterhood" (Note: Also titled "The Sister Hood" in episode guides.)	Richard Bowman & Mircea Mannta	Laura McCreary	Fred Gonzales & Elaine Hultgren	December 12, 1998	4346-121	ABC-210 UPN-40
"Portrait of the Artist as a Young Milo": For the first time in his life, Milo suffers a mental block when he tries to come up with an entry for the Dental Hygienapalooza Poster Contest. Guest voices: Mark Hamill as himself. "The Sisterhood": Lydia and Janie drag a reluctant Pepper Ann to a women's retreat called "Adamant Eve," where women celebrate and discuss their place in society and history.
24	11	"Impractical Jokes"	Mircea Mannta, Joanna Romersa & John Kimball	Mo Rocca	Wendy Grieb & Lyndon Ruddy	December 26, 1998	4346-122	ABC-211 UPN-41
24	11	"Cold Feet"	Mircea Mannta, Joanna Romersa & John Kimball	Laura McCreary	Wendy Grieb & Lyndon Ruddy	December 26, 1998	4346-124	ABC-211 UPN-41
"Impractical Jokes": Pepper Ann, Milo and Nicky compete in a practical joke-off, but Pepper Ann turns the simple joke-off into an all-out war. "Cold Feet": During Grandpa Leo and Grandma Lillian's 50th anniversary vow renewal, Grandma Lillian tells Pepper Ann the story of how she was once a promising actress who gave up a chance at the big time to marry Leo (who was fighting in World War II at the time), almost got on the plane that killed Richie Valens, Buddy Holly, and The Big Bopper, and worked the pageant circuit in order to help Lydia pay for their house.
25	12	"Doppelganger Didi"	Richard Bowman & Rick Leon	David Hemingson	Elaine Hultgren & Gilbert Weems Jr.	January 9, 1999	4346-126	ABC-212 UPN-39
25	12	"Pepper Ann's Day Off-Kilter"	Richard Bowman & Rick Leon	Scott M. Gimple	Elaine Hultgren & Gilbert Weems Jr.	January 9, 1999	4346-123	ABC-212 UPN-39
"Doppelganger Didi": Pepper Ann freaks out when she sees a private schoolgirl who looks exactly like her. "Pepper Ann's Day Off-Kilter": Fed up with having no sick days, Pepper Ann fakes sick, and finds that life at home is boring.
26	13	"A No Hair Day"	Mircea Mantta & Joanna Romersa	Laura McCreary	Fred Gonzales & Wendy Grieb	January 16, 1999	4346-115	ABC-213 UPN-34
26	13	"That's My Dad" (Note: Working title: "That's My Dad!".)	Mircea Mantta & Joanna Romersa	Matthew Negrete & Nahnatchka Khan	Fred Gonzales & Wendy Grieb	January 16, 1999	4346-125	ABC-213 UPN-34
"A No Hair Day": When Craig shaves his head to be more aerodynamic for the swim team, Pepper Ann worries about whether or not she's shallow, as she's shocked to find that Craig doesn't look right bald. Meanwhile, Alice Kane is paired up with Pink-Eye Pete for a science project and tries (in vain) to treat his infected eyeball. "That's My Dad": Pepper Ann tries to learn everything about her father, Chuck, in time for a father/daughter game show after Trinket claims that Pepper Ann doesn't know her own father because of the divorce.

=== Season 3 (1999–2000) ===
The third season of Pepper Ann consists of 26 episodes (42 segments). Due to crediting inconsistencies, the episodes are ordered below by their package order (as initially featured on Disney+) (Note: As of late 2024, the episodes listed under Season 3 were reordered from the initial order present from when the show was first added.) and not their original broadcast order.

Note: This season was produced concurrently with the following season. Episodes from this season premiered interchangeably on ABC and UPN (in syndication).

No. overall	No. in season	Title	Animation director(s)	Written by	Storyboard by	Original release date	Prod. code	Packaging code
27	1	"Burn Hazelnut Burn" (Note: Working title: "Burn, Hazelnut, Burn".)	Mircea Mantta & Bob Shellhorn	Madellaine Paxson	Stephanie Gladden & John Nevarez	November 6, 1999	4346-201	UPN-1A (Note: "Burn Hazelnut Burn" and "Career Daze" were paired for UPN-1.)
27	1	"The Wash-Out" (Note: Also titled "The Washout" in episode guides.)	Mircea Mantta & Bob Shellhorn	Laura McCreary	Stephanie Gladden & John Nevarez	February 6, 2000	4346-207	ABC-304A UPN-48A (Note: "The Wash-Out" and "Def Comedy Mom" were paired for ABC-304/UPN-48.)
"Burn Hazelnut Burn": Cameron Landisburg, a Hollywood director known for his cheesy action movies, challenges Pepper Ann to make a movie of her own after reading one of her disparaging reviews from the school newspaper, and Pepper Ann learns the trials and tribulations of filmmaking when Trinket offers to fund P.A.'s film, recasts Pepper Ann and Craig as the leads with Cissy and Wayne Macabre, and hires Tessa and Vanessa to rewrite the script. "The Wash-Out": When Gwen Mezzrow leaves school crying after Nurse Oomla talks to her in the hallway, Pepper Ann accidentally starts a rumor that Gwen was sent home for having head lice.
28	2	"G.I. Janie"	Rick Leon & Bob Shellhorn	Eddie Guzelian	Ryan Anthony & Gilbert Weems Jr.	February 7, 2000	4346-202	UPN-2
28	2	"Miss Moose"	Rick Leon & Bob Shellhorn	Scott M. Gimple	Ryan Anthony & Gilbert Weems Jr.	February 7, 2000	4346-212	UPN-2
"G.I. Janie": Aunt Janie buys a console and a collection of video games as research for an upcoming speech about the dangers of video game violence, and soon becomes hooked. "Miss Moose": Pepper Ann tries to make her androgynous sister, Moose (born Margaret Rose Pearson), into the epitome of femininity after Stuart and Lamar mistake her as PA's brother; Pepper Ann fears that Moose will get into trouble if people take her tomboyish nature the wrong way. Note: This episode was removed from syndication on Disney Channel and Toon Disney in 2002, potentially due to the references to video game violence in "G.I. Janie", or the themes of gender identity and sexism in "Miss Moose". Disney+, however, currently has the episode on their streaming service.
29	3	"Pepper Shaker"	Frank Andrina & Joanna Romersa	Mirith J.S. Colao	Fred Gonzales & Wendy Grieb	February 8, 2000	N/A	UPN-3A
29	3	"Flaw and Order" (Note: Working title: "Flaw & Order".)	Frank Andrina & Joanna Romersa	Mo Rocca	Fred Gonzales & Wendy Grieb	February 8, 2000	N/A	ABC-504A (Note: "Flaw and Order" and "The Great Beyond" were paired for ABC-504.) UPN-3B
"Pepper Shaker": An earthquake in Hazelnut has Pepper Ann worried that her town isn't safe from natural disasters. "Flaw and Order": In a mock trial centered on the Boston Tea Party, Pepper Ann tries to breeze her way through the defense, but Cissy and Trinket's team have solid evidence and witnesses that show that, despite their noble protest against the Kings unfair taxes, the Sons of Liberty are still liable for damages done to the tea thrown in the harbor.
30	4	"Def Comedy Mom"	Frank Andrina, Mircea Mantta & Barbara Dourmashkin-Case	Sean Whalen	James Caswell & Wendy Grieb	November 6, 1999	N/A	ABC-304B UPN-48B
30	4	"Career Daze"	Frank Andrina, Mircea Mantta & Barbara Dourmashkin-Case	Matthew Negrete	James Caswell & Wendy Grieb	February 6, 2000	N/A	ABC-506B (Note: "P.A.'s Pop Fly" and "Career Daze" were paired for ABC-506.) UPN-1B
"Def Comedy Mom": Lydia's witty remarks at a PTA meeting prompts her to try her hand at being a stand-up comic, but Pepper Ann is afraid Lydia will use her most embarrassing moments as comedic fodder. "Career Daze": Thanks to a schoolwide aptitude test, Pepper Ann, Milo, and Nicky are assigned unlikely careers: Nicky spends a week with a butcher, Milo tries his hand at being a stockbroker, and Pepper Ann shadows Principal Hickey when her test results show that she'd make a great middle school principal.
31	5	"Baggy Bean Buddies"	Richard Bowman & Joanna Romersa	Laura McCreary	Elaine Hultgren & Lyndon Ruddy	February 9, 2000	4346-210	UPN-4A (Note: "Baggy Bean Buddies" and "The Beans of Wrath" were paired for UPN-4.)
31	5	"The Spanish Imposition"	Richard Bowman & Joanna Romersa	Mirith J.S. Colao	Elaine Hultgren & Lyndon Ruddy	January 22, 2000	4346-213	ABC-308A UPN-52A (Note: "The Spanish Imposition" and "Single Unemployed Mother" were paired for ABC-308/UPN-52.)
"Baggy Bean Buddies": During an addiction support group meeting, Pepper Ann tells the story of how she got hooked on collecting Beanie Baby-esque stuffed animals known as Baggie Bean Buddies. "The Spanish Imposition": It's Elective Class Week, and Pepper Ann plans on picking Music Appreciation with Mrs. "Kick" Bach, as the class is little more than a free period with music, but when the coveted class fills up, Pepper Ann is forced to take a class that requires her to actually learn something: Spanish I.
32	6	"The Beans of Wrath"	Frank Andrina, Richard Bowman, Rick Leon & Bob Shellhorn	Madellaine Paxson	Elaine Hultgren & Gilbert Weems Jr.	February 9, 2000	4346-205	UPN-4B
32	6	"Effie Shrugged"	Frank Andrina, Richard Bowman, Rick Leon & Bob Shellhorn	Scott M. Gimple	Elaine Hultgren & Gilbert Weems Jr.	January 15, 2000	4346-211	ABC-307A UPN-51A (Note: "Effie Shrugged" and "Mom Knows What P.A. Dd Two Nights Ago" were paired for ABC-307/UPN-51.)
"The Beans of Wrath": Pepper Ann calls on Aunt Janie to help grow an organic garden for a school project. "Effie Shrugged": Feeling neglected by Milo and Nicky, Pepper Ann befriends a gifted, overgrown elementary school student who can get P.A. anything she wants —through brute force.
33	7	"The Velvet Room"	Rick Leon, Mircea Mannta & Bob Shellhorn	Madellaine Paxson	Fred Gonzales & Wendy Grieb	February 10, 2000	4346-214	UPN-5
Half-hour episode. Lydia decorates one room in her house into a "velvet room" (a room that's only used for special occasions) for a magazine interview, but when she overdoes it on redecorating the house, Pepper Ann runs away — and finds that her friends' parents have similar velvet rooms, from Milo's game room to Tessa and Vanessa's front lawn to a basketball court in Gwen Mezzrow's basement.
34	8	"One Angry Woman"	Richard Bowman & Joanna Romersa	Nahnatchka Khan	Lyndon Ruddy & Gilbert Weems Jr.	February 11, 2000	4346-215	UPN-6
Half-hour episode. Pepper Ann is forced to keep an orderly house when Lydia is called in for jury duty on a case involving a boy who allegedly spat at an ATM security camera.
35	9	"The Sellout" (Note: Also titled "The Sell-Out" in episode guides.)	Rick Leon & Will Knoll	Mo Rocca	Wendy Grieb & Elaine Hultgren	February 13, 2000	4346-219	UPN-7
35	9	"The Tell Tale Fuzzy" (Note: Working title: "The Tell-Tale Fuzzy".)	Rick Leon & Will Knoll	Mirith J.S. Colao	Wendy Grieb & Elaine Hultgren	February 13, 2000	4346-230	UPN-7
"The Sellout": Nicky regrets giving her last ticket to an upcoming Flaming Snot concert to Pepper Ann, and the ensuing fight threatens to tear apart their friendship. "The Tell Tale Fuzzy": Pepper Ann finds a wad of money at the mall and blows it on a velvet painting of Fuzzy, but her conscience begins to bother her, as she feels she should have, at least, turned in the money to mall security or asked around to see if anyone lost it.
36	10	"Dances With Ignorance"	Richard Bowman & Joanna Romersa	Eddie Guzelian	Gilbert Weems Jr. & Lyndon Ruddy	September 18, 1999	4346-221	ABC-302 UPN-46
36	10	"Girl Power"	Richard Bowman & Joanna Romersa	Madellaine Paxson	Gilbert Weems Jr. & Lyndon Ruddy	September 18, 1999	4346-220	ABC-302 UPN-46
"Dances With Ignorance": While researching her family heritage, Pepper Ann finds out from her father that she's 1/16 Navajo Indian on her father's side of the family, but Pepper Ann's stereotypical views of American Indian culture cause her to offend the Navajo family she invited to dinner. "Girl Power": Moose's favorite comic book Tundra Woman gets adapted into a Saturday morning cartoon, but when Tundra Woman is turned into a shallow, shopaholic girly-girl, Moose, Janie and Lydia protest.
37	11	"Sammy's Song"	Richard Bowman & Joanna Romersa	Scott M. Gimple	Wendy Grieb & John Nevarez	February 15, 2000	4346-223	UPN-8
37	11	"Permanent Record"	Richard Bowman & Joanna Romersa	Mirith J.S. Colao	Wendy Grieb & John Nevarez	February 15, 2000	4346-224	UPN-8
"Sammy's Song": Pepper Ann protests against a peanut butter company whose jars are dangerous to animals after a skunk gets its head stuck in one. "Permanent Record": Nicky plots to get a detention removed from her permanent record.
38	12	"Live and Let Dye"	Rick Leon & Mircea Mantta	Laura McCreary	Jim Caswell & Elaine Hultgren	February 16, 2000	4346-222	UPN-9
Half-hour episode. Pepper Ann dyes her hair in order to stand out from the middle school crowd, but can't handle being known as "the green-haired girl". Meanwhile, Lydia dates a handsome country line-dancing teacher who isn't who he seems, and Aunt Janie protests against plans to disrupt a family of whooping cranes making a nest on top of a streetlight.
39	13	"Remote Possibilities"	Rick Leon	Laura McCreary	Elaine Hultgren & John Nevarez	February 17, 2000	4346-216	UPN-10A
39	13	"Considering Constance"	Rick Leon	Scott M. Gimple	Elaine Hultgren & John Nevarez	February 17, 2000	4346-218	ABC-505A (Note: "Considering Constance" and "Guess Who's Coming to the Theater" were paired for ABC-505.) UPN-10B
"Remote Possibilities": Nicky and Stuart try each other's hobbies out to gain perspective on their relationship. "Considering Constance": A shy middle schooler named Constance turns to Pepper Ann to help her be more confident and charismatic; Constance soon puts her advice into question once Pepper Ann takes her under her wing.
40	14	"You Oughta Be in Musicals!" (Note: Working title: "You Oughta Be In Musicals".)	Richard Bowman & Mircea Mannta	Laura McCreary	Wendy Grieb & Lyndon Ruddy	September 11, 1999	4346-203	ABC-301 UPN-45
Half-hour episode. Pepper Ann auditions for a school musical in order to put some excitement in her life, but an accident knocks her unconscious and sends her to a world where every day is a musical.
41	15	"Beyond Good and Evel"	Rick Leon, Bob Shellhorn & William Knoll	Scott M. Gimple	Jim Caswell & Elaine Hultgren	September 25, 1999	4346-217	ABC-303 UPN-47
41	15	"One of the Guys"	Rick Leon, Bob Shellhorn & William Knoll	Madellaine Paxson	Jim Caswell & Elaine Hultgren	September 25, 1999	4346-237	ABC-303 UPN-47
"Beyond Good and Evel": Moose starts a petition to have Evel Knievel's likeness turned into a statue for Lupkin Park (after the old statue is taken down due to a town scandal), despite being turned down and ridiculed. "One of the Guys": Pepper Ann worries over her femininity when she's chosen to be the football team's newest placekicker and the other guys on the team love her for being rough-and-tumble, so Pepper Ann decides to compete in a beauty pageant, which happens to land on the same night as one of her football games.
42	16	"The First Date Club"	Will Knoll & Mircea Mannta	Matthew Negrete	John Nevarez & Gilbert Weems Jr.	November 13, 1999	4346-227	ABC-305 UPN-49
42	16	"Unicycle of Life"	Will Knoll & Mircea Mannta	Mo Rocca	John Nevarez & Gilbert Weems Jr.	November 13, 1999	4346-228	ABC-305 UPN-49
"The First Date Club": Pepper Ann starts to worry that a night out with Craig may be her first date with him. "Unicycle of Life": Pepper Ann puts Milo through hell attempting to stop a rumor that she and Milo are dating.
43	17	"To Germany With Love" (Note: AWorking title: "To Germany, With Love".)	Joanna Romersa	Matthew Negrete	Brad Goodchild & Gilbert Weems Jr.	February 18, 2000	4346-225	UPN-11
Half-hour episode. In this clip show episode, Dieter sends his father (who lives in Germany) a video letter about his time in Hazelnut, but resorts to asking his friends and fellow Hazelnutians on what makes the town special (prompting clips from past episodes). Meanwhile, Pepper Ann deals with the fallout of taking advantage of Stuart for a science project.
44	18	"A Valentine's Day Tune"	Richard Bowman & Joanna Romersa	Madellaine Paxson	Lyndon Ruddy & Jim Caswell	February 14, 2000	4346-233	UPN-12
Half-hour episode. In this Valentines Day spin on A Christmas Carol, Pepper Ann is visited by the ghosts of her past, present and future, to see why she hates Valentines Day, what others think about her hatred of the holiday, and what will happen if she doesn't change her ways.
45	19	"Bye Bye Trinket" (Note: Working title: "Bye-Bye, Trinket, Bye-Bye".)	Mircea Mannta & Bob Shellhorn	Matthew Negrete	Wendy Grieb & Elaine Hultgren	February 20, 2000	4346-234	UPN-13A
45	19	"P.A.'s Pop Fly"	Mircea Mannta & Bob Shellhorn	Scott M. Gimple	Wendy Grieb & Elaine Hultgren	February 20, 2000	4346-235	ABC-506A UPN-13B
"Bye Bye Trinket": When Trinket announces that she's transferring to a boarding school, Cissy is crushed, everyone wishes Trinket best of luck, and Pepper Ann is initially apathetic since she and Trinket have never gotten along, but reconsiders when she thinks that Trinket insulting Pepper Ann was her way of asking for her friendship. "P.A.'s Pop Fly": Pepper Ann catches a star baseball player's pop fly during a game and must choose to either sell it for big bucks or return it to the player, who wants it to commemorate the best moment of his life.
46	20	"My Mother, My Self" (Note: Working title: "My Mother, Myself".)	Richard Bowman & Rick Leon	Mirith J.S. Colao	John Nevarez & Gilbert Weems Jr.	February 21, 2000	4346-229	UPN-14
Half-hour episode. In this homage to Freaky Friday, a comet passes over the Pearson house and Pepper Ann and Lydia are cursed to live in each other's shoes to see who has it tougher.
47	21	"The Amazing Becky Little" (Note: Also titled "Amazing Becky Little" in episode guides.)	Mircea Mannta & Joanna Romersa	Laura McCreary	Jim Caswell & Lyndon Ruddy	February 22, 2000	4346-232	UPN-15
Half-hour episode. Nicky attempts to get over her fear of swans to get a spot on the Hazelnut Junior Orchestra when a visit from her older sister, Becky Little, brings back feelings of inadequacy for Nicky.
48	22	"A Kosher Christmas"	Richard Bowman, Rick Leon & Mircea Mannta	Madellaine Paxson	Fred Gonzales, Wendy Grieb & Lyndon Ruddy	December 18, 1999	4346-244	ABC-306; UPN-50
Half-hour episode. A holiday school assignment prompts Pepper Ann to decide whether she enjoys Christmas with her father or Hanukkah with her mother.
49	23	"The Untitled Milo Kamalani Project"	Richard Bowman & Bob Shellhorn	Scott M. Gimple	Wendy Grieb & Gilbert Weems Jr.	February 23, 2000	4346-236	UPN-16A
49	23	"Guess Who's Coming to the Theater" (Note: Working title: "Guess Who's Coming to the Theatre?".)	Richard Bowman & Bob Shellhorn	Laura McCreary	Wendy Grieb & Gilbert Weems Jr.	February 23, 2000	4346-245	ABC-505B UPN-16B
"The Untitled Milo Kamalani Project": Milo enters an album cover contest with a slapdash, no-effort art piece—and ends up winning and becoming Hazelnut's premier outsider artist. "Guess Who's Coming to the Theater": Pepper Ann appears in a school production of "Guess Who's Coming to Dinner", and P.A. worries that her mom (who is dating the handsome country line-dancer Bernie) and her father (who also has a date, courtesy of Pepper Ann) will embarrass her. Meanwhile, Nicky breaks her pescetarian diet.
50	24	"Single Unemployed Mother" (Note: Working title: "Single, Unemployed Mother".)	Joanna Romersa	Mirith J.S. Colao	John Nevarez & Gilbert Weems Jr.	January 22, 2000	4346-239	ABC-308B UPN-52B
50	24	"Mom Knows What P.A. Did Two Nights Ago"	Joanna Romersa	Scott M. Gimple	John Nevarez & Gilbert Weems Jr.	January 15, 2000	4346-243	ABC-307B UPN-51B
"Single Unemployed Mother": Pepper Ann's mother quits her job at "It's You!" (a clothing store at the Hazelnut Mall) after her demanding boss, Mitch, pushes her too far—and finds that searching for work is tougher than she thought. Meanwhile, Pepper Ann does whatever she can to rake in extra money while her mom is job hunting. "Mom Knows What P.A. Did Two Nights Ago": Pepper Ann hides the fact that she saw an R-rated horror film from her mother, but the guilt and the scary scenes from the movie drive P.A. insane from lack of sleep.
51	25	"The Great Beyond"	Rick Leon & Mircea Mantta	Eddie Guzelian	Elaine Hultgren & John Nevarez	February 25, 2000	4346-240	ABC-504B UPN-17A
51	25	"Jaybirds of a Feather"	Rick Leon & Mircea Mantta	Mirith J.S. Colao	Elaine Hultgren & John Nevarez	February 25, 2000	4346-241	UPN-17B
"The Great Beyond": When Steve the Cat is diagnosed with a pancreatic illness, Pepper Ann begins wondering about death and the afterlife. "Jaybirds of a Feather": Pepper Ann is excited when Moose joins the Junior Jaybird Girls because she was in the group once and is in the running to be Moose's sponsor—until P.A. discovers that she never got her last badge and must join the Junior Jaybirds in order to get it.
52	26	"The Way They Were"	Bob Shellhorn & Woody Yocum	Matthew Negrete & Nahnatchka Khan	Jim Caswell, Lyndon Ruddy & Elaine Hultgren	February 27, 2000	4346-231	UPN-18
Half-hour episode. Milo, Nicky and Pepper Ann's latest argument causes the three to split up, while flashbacks show how the trio met up in the first place.

=== Season 4 (2000–01) ===
The fourth season (Note: Several sites and guides erroneously refer to Season 4 as Season 5 due to the previous season being aired across ABC and UPN. The season's ABC packaging codes reflect this.) of Pepper Ann consists of 13 episodes (23 segments). Due to crediting inconsistencies, the episodes are ordered below by their package order (as initially featured on Disney+) and not their original broadcast order.

Note: This season was produced concurrently with the previous season, and is sometimes considered part of the third season. Episodes from this season premiered on ABC, UPN, and Disney Channel (in syndication).

No. overall	No. in season	Title	Animation director(s)	Written by	Storyboard by	Original release date	Prod. code	Packaging code
53	1	"The One With Mr. Reason"	Richard Bowman & Woody Yocum	Scott M. Gimple	Wendy Grieb & Elaine Hultgren	September 9, 2000	4346-301	ABC-501
53	1	"Sense and Senselessness"	Richard Bowman & Woody Yocum	Madellaine Paxson	Wendy Grieb & Elaine Hultgren	September 9, 2000	4346-302	ABC-501
"The One With Mr. Reason": Pepper Ann is assigned woodshop with Mr. Reason for the new school semester, but she doesn't agree with his tough love methods. "Sense and Senselessness": Pepper Ann uses a relationship book to figure out which of her three admirers (Craig, Joaquim, and Bud) she wants to take to a party.
54	2	"Dear Debby"	Rick Leon, Mircea Mannta & Bob Shellhorn	Emily Kapnek	John Nevarez & Gilbert Weems Jr.	November 15, 2001	4346-304	N/A (Note: This episode was only broadcast through syndication on Disney Channel and Toon Disney.)
54	2	"Reality Bytes"	Rick Leon, Mircea Mannta & Bob Shellhorn	Allison Heartinger	John Nevarez & Gilbert Weems Jr.	September 16, 2000	4346-306	ABC-502B (Note: "Forging Ahead" and "Reality Bytes" were paired for ABC-502.)
"Dear Debby": Pepper Ann thinks her Aunt Janie is having marital problems after reading an advice column. "Reality Bytes": Pepper Ann ends up addicted to the Internet while researching for a school project.
55	3	"Complimentary Colors" (Note: Working title: "Complementary Colors".)	Richard Bowman & Woody Yocum	Madellaine Paxson	Elaine Hultgren & Craig Kemplin	November 4, 2000	4346-307	ABC-507
Half-hour episode. Pepper Ann runs for student office against Alice Kane. Guest voice: Mark Hamill as himself.
56	4	"Searching for Pepper Ann Pearson"	Rick Leon & Mircea Mantta	Mo Rocca	Wendy Grieb & Gilbert Weems Jr.	November 19, 2001	4346-303	N/A
56	4	"Forging Ahead"	Rick Leon & Mircea Mantta	Eddy Sato	Wendy Grieb & Gilbert Weems Jr.	September 16, 2000	4346-305	ABC-502A
"Searching for Pepper Ann Pearson": Pepper Ann sneaks out of detention and heads to the park, where she wins her first game of chess ever against a seasoned master. Guest voice: Will Ferrell as Alf. "Forging Ahead": Sick of her mom doing what she thinks is best for her, Pepper Ann decides to get her ears pierced, but the piercing kiosk clerk doesn't pierce anyone under 18 without parental permission, so Pepper Ann decides to forge her mom's signature.
57	5	"Carmello"	Richard Bowman & Woody Yocum	Allison Heartinger	Fred Gonzales & John Nevarez	September 23, 2000	4346-310	ABC-503A (Note: "Carmello" and "Strike it or Not" were paired for ABC-503.)
57	5	"Too Cool to Be Mom"	Richard Bowman & Woody Yocum	Emily Kapnek	Fred Gonzales & John Nevarez	January 6, 2001	4346-313	ABC-508A (Note: "Too Cool to Be Mom" and "Two's Company" were paired for ABC-508.)
"Carmello": Pepper Ann is excited when her science class begins dissecting frogs, but the excitement wanes when Pepper Ann bonds with her frog, Carmello, before the assignment. "Too Cool to be Mom": Pepper Ann tries to make her mom cool after seeing Constance Goldman's mother. Note: This segment only aired once on ABC and primarily aired through syndication on Disney Channel and Toon Disney.
58	6	"The Word"	Rick Leon & Mircea Mantta	Mirith J.S. Colao	Elaine Hultgren & Craig Kemplin	November 21, 2001	4346-308	N/A
58	6	"The Perfect Couple"	Rick Leon & Mircea Mantta	Laura McCreary	Elaine Hultgren & Craig Kemplin	November 21, 2001	4346-311	N/A
"The Word": Pepper Ann sees a bizarre word ("frasny") written on the bathroom wall and is bewildered when it becomes a trend. "The Perfect Couple": Pepper Ann throws Nicky and Stuart a surprise party since she considers them to be "the perfect couple", right when Nicky and Stuart decide to break up. Meanwhile, Milo and Gwen contemplate becoming a couple.
59	7	"The Merry Lives of Pepper Ann"	Richard Bowman & Joanna Romersa	Scott M. Gimple	Wendy Grieb & Gilbert Weems Jr.	November 5, 2000	4346-309	UPN-53
Half-hour episode. Sick of the grind of everyday preteen life, Pepper Ann gets involved in a medieval fair, where she takes the alias of Lady Gwynne.
60	8	"Strike it or Not" (Note: Working title: "Strike It or Not".)	Mircea Mannta & Woody Yocum	Matthew Negrete	Fred Gonzales & John Nevarez	September 23, 2000	4346-312	ABC-503B
60	8	"Moose in Love"	Mircea Mannta & Woody Yocum	Madellaine Paxson	Fred Gonzales & John Nevarez	November 23, 2001	4346-314	N/A
"Strike it or Not": Hazelnut Middle School is shut down due to the teachers' strike, and Pepper Ann initially enjoys the time off from school -- until she learns that the school's budget cuts could affect the soccer team. "Moose in Love": Moose is in love with "Shouty Kid" Sean, a boy who turns out to be the son of Lydia and Janie's most hated enemy: lingerie store clerk, Margot Lesandre.
61	9	"Two's Company"	Rick Leon & Joanna Romersa	Mirith J.S. Colao	Elaine Hultgren & Craig S. Kemplin	January 6, 2001	4346-317	ABC-508B
61	9	"A is for Average"	Rick Leon & Joanna Romersa	Eddy Sato	Elaine Hultgren & Craig S. Kemplin	November 6, 2000	4346-318	UPN-54A (Note: "A is for Average" and "Alice Kane Went Down to Calcutta" were paired for UPN-54.)
"Two's Company": When Nicky and Milo break up from their respective partners (Stuart and Gwen), Pepper Ann suggests Milo and Nicky date each other to make the two jealous. Note: This segment only aired once on ABC and primarily aired through syndication on Disney Channel and Toon Disney. "A is for Average": Pepper Ann takes a magazine quiz and is shocked to find that she's average.
62	10	"That's My Mama Destructo"	Richard Bowman & Joanna Romersa	Scott M. Gimple	Wendy Grieb & Gilbert Weems Jr.	September 4, 2001 (Note: Toon Disney preview date.); November 27, 2001	4346-315	N/A
62	10	"Unhappy Campers"	Richard Bowman & Joanna Romersa	Madellaine Paxson	Wendy Grieb & Gilbert Weems Jr.	September 4, 2001 November 27, 2001	4346-316	N/A
"That's My Mama Destructo": Pepper Ann wins the chance to have her favorite wrestler, Mama Destructo, teach seventh grade math for a week, which goes pear-shape when Mama Destructo turns out to be a lousy teacher. "Unhappy Campers": Pepper Ann, Milo and Nicky are sent to a behavioral camp for wayward kids after a break-in plan goes awry. Guest voice: Alex Trebek as himsef.
63	11	"The Finale"	Rick Leon & Mircea Mannta	Matthew Negrete	Fred Gonzales & John Nevarez	September 5, 2001 November 28, 2001	4346-319	N/A
Fifteen years into the future, Pepper Ann (now a 27-year-old educational toy maker) is invited to a Hazelnut Middle School reunion, where she must stop them from digging up a time capsule, which contains an embarrassing letter she wrote when she was 12. Guest voices: Mark Hamill and Alex Trebek Note: Despite being written as a finale, this episode was produced and packaged as the third-to-last episode; it also wasn't the final episode to premiere.
64	12	"Spice of Life" (Note: Working title: "The Spice of Life".)	Richard Bowman & Joanna Romersa	Mirith J.S. Colao	Craig S. Kemplin & Elaine Hultgren	November 12, 2000	4346-320	UPN-55A (Note: "Spice of Life" and "T.G.I.F." were paired for UPN-55.)
64	12	"Alice Kane Went Down to Calcutta"	Richard Bowman & Joanna Romersa	Laura McCreary	Craig S. Kemplin & Elaine Hultgren	November 6, 2000	4346-322	UPN-54B
"Spice of Life": Pepper Ann deals with a mean old woman who doesn't like door-to-door salespeople, but when she dies (and Pepper Ann finds out that she's the mother of school secretary Vera), Pepper Ann offers to speak at her funeral, but how can she eulogize someone she hates and barely knows? "Alice Kane Went Down to Calcutta": Alice Kane makes peace with Pepper Ann after Alice announces that her father is taking a new job in Calcutta, India, but Pepper Ann thinks the whole thing is a trap.
65	13	"T.G.I.F."	Richard Bowman, Mircea Mannta & Bob Shellhorn	Madellaine Paxson	Wendy Grieb, Elaine Hultgren & Gilbert Weems Jr.	November 12, 2000	4346-323	UPN-55B
65	13	"Zen and the Art of Milo"	Richard Bowman, Mircea Mannta & Bob Shellhorn	Scott M. Gimple & Laura McCreary	Wendy Grieb, Elaine Hultgren & Gilbert Weems Jr.	November 30, 2001	4346-321	N/A
"T.G.I.F.": In this parody of the Bill Murray comedy "Groundhog Day", Pepper Ann fakes sick to get out of taking a history test she didn't study for; she finds herself living the same day over and over again until she can change history. "Zen and the Art of Milo": Milo transfers to a Shaolin Buddhist academy, which doesn't sit well with Pepper Ann.
