= Mrs. Munger's Class =

American interstitial television program

- Directed by: Tim Maloney
- Starring: Peter Hastings; Rob Paulsen; Cree Summer; C.J. Arabia; Melissa Samuels; Brett Bauer
- Country of origin: United States
- Original language: English
- No. of seasons: 2
- No. of episodes: 41

Production
- Running time: 90 seconds

Original release
- Network: ABC (part of Disney's One Saturday Morning)
- Release: September 13, 1997 – December 19, 1998

Mrs. Munger's Class is two seasons of brief, 90-second skits on Disney's One Saturday Morning on ABC that featured the talking heads of a middle school yearbook page. The kids in the photos would often exchange silly dialogue and insults, while Mrs. Munger would tell them to "Simmer down! Simmer! Simmer!" The camera would focus on whoever was speaking on one part of the yearbook page and quickly pan to follow the dialogue. Students would move between the pictures to interact with one another. The show was in shot black-and-white, but color was used on occasion (on field trips or to show makeup). The skits used Adobe After Effects and Photoshop to manipulate photographs from a school yearbook.

== Pilot ==
A 22-minute pilot was made in attempt to launch an extensive series, but was left unaired in the outcome of the lawsuit filed by the students. It notably contained brief uses of the offensive word "damn" and a sub-plot about an R-rated film. It also features Brad, a character used later for the spin-off series Centerville, which the same studio made after its cancellation.

== Controversy ==
Although the school portraits used in the show were manipulated, collaged, and otherwise altered, the plaintiffs in the class' action lawsuit felt that there was still too much resemblance. As such, the plaintiffs claimed the photographs were used for entertainment without personality rights clearance. Mrs. Munger turned out to be Mrs. Kathleen Foresman, who had taught at Woodbridge Middle School in the Washington, D.C. suburb of Woodbridge, Virginia, in 1975 when her picture and those of her 6th grade students were taken for a page in a yearbook. She, and four of her former students, filed suit against Disney on December 23, 1998. Edward Jackson, a computer engineer in San Diego, had learned that his likeness was being used after his 10-year-old niece brought the similarity to his attention. Jackson, an African-American student, was outraged not only at the use of his photo, but at the "Buckwheat"-like speech pattern of the character. The lawsuit was settled for undisclosed damages. After the lawsuit, Maloney created the short-lived skit series Centerville, which used the same premise of talking student photos. However, unlike its predecessor, the characters in Centerville were not confined to a yearbook page and appear in different settings.

== Adult characters ==
- Mrs. Munger (voiced by Peter Hastings): The teacher of the title class. She regularly implores the class to "simmer" when things get out of hand. When things get too much out of hand, she yells out, "HEY!" Although often expressing frustration toward the class, she generally manages to take things in stride. Usually, each episode would end with her saying, "Good gravy!" or “Oh for the love of (insert object)!”
- Susan Weiner: The field hockey coach. Appears as a substitute teacher in "Substitute Teacher" and attempts to teach fire safety in "Fire Drill".
- Fern Berkowitz: An Eastern European-American woman who teaches creative movement to the students in the episode "Creative Movement". Mrs. Munger and Fern were roommates at Chunkin College.
- Mrs. Yamaguchi: An Asian-American teacher from the next room, whose class Rock mischievously telecommunicates with in the episode "Class Computer".
- Sven: A somewhat effeminate man with a Scandinavian accent. He gives Mrs. Munger a makeover in "Make-Over".

== Students ==
In order from top left to bottom right:

- Lance (voiced by Rob Paulsen): Speaks only in Pig Latin. Apart from Cissy tattling, no one acknowledges this.
- Gordon (voiced by Cree Summer): Gordon generally utters sassy comebacks and one-liners. He finishes his quotes with "ole!"
- Karyn (voiced by C.J. Arabia): She is infatuated with death.
- Artie (voiced by Brett Bauer): A kid from New Jersey. Most of his statements are very simple, or even unrelated to the topic at hand. When asked to interpret an art piece, for example, he responds with "I'm hungry and my feet hurt".
- Dawn (voiced by Melissa Samuels): The class' kiss-up, who reveals that she is overcompensating for her parents that travel a lot. She often refers to her fellow students as "the children". Her portrait is located directly next to Mrs. Munger's. She is also implied to be Jewish during the holiday-themed episode.
- Cissy (voiced by C.J. Arabia): The tattletale. In field trip episodes, she often wears her girl scout uniform, numbered "666".
- Yvonne (voiced by Cree Summer): An African-American liberal feminist, in tune with modern art and high culture. Her responses usually pertain to oppression, social injustice and other common feminist topics.
- Grace (voiced by Melissa Samuels): She is the figurative punching bag of the class. She generally says "Cut it out!"
- Theodore (voiced by Peter Hastings): A generally stupid student who stalls, stutters and takes forever to answer a question, even then almost always giving the wrong answer.
- Rock (voiced by Rob Paulsen): The class nerd. He doesn't talk until late season 1, but only in object–subject–verb-style (Yoda speak). Rock is friends with Lance and in the "Creative Movement" episode implies that he believes himself to be from another planet.
- Amanda (voiced by C.J. Arabia): A stereotypical flower child. She likes to sing or recite poetry. Most of her lines are sung.
- Phoebe (voiced by Melissa Samuels): Prone to random outbursts, stares the rest of the time. She brings her mom's cosmetics to school in several Season 2 episodes.
- George and George (voiced by Brett Bauer): The troublemakers who are both named George and look alike. When people call them twins, they always say, "We're not twins!"
- Mahoot (voiced by Brett Bauer): Mahoot's only usual line of dialogue is a brief, throaty "what" whenever he is addressed. In 'Good Will Mahoot', he spoke an actual sentence, followed by "What" when a stunned Mrs. Munger asks him to repeat himself. In "Simmer Minute", the thoughts inside his head are radio interference noises.

== Class pets ==
- Gerald the Gerbil is a deceased class pet.
- Rupert is a turtle. On his first day in the class, some of the students annoy him, and he retaliates by biting them.

== One-time students ==
- Darryl: Mahoot's cousin, who appeared only in "Mahoot's Cousin". He also says only "What?" and is apparently dumber and weirder than Mahoot. He has a crush on Phoebe.
- Farquhar: A foreign exchange student from Sri Lanka. Only seen in "Exchange Student".

== Episodes ==
=== Season 1 (1997–98) ===
- Word Problem (09/13/1997)
- Origami (09/20/1997)
- Math, Sarcasm, and Paper (09/27/1997)
- The Curve (10/04/1997)
- En Espagnol (10/11/1997)
- Field Trip (10/18/1997)
- Halloween (10/25/1997)
- Permission Slips (11/01/1997)
- The Zoo (11/08/1997)
- Substitute Teacher (11/15/1997)
- Thanksgiving (11/22/1997)
- Rock's Song (11/29/1997)
- Oral Reports (12/06/1997)
- Spelling Bee (12/13/1997)
- Christmas (12/20/1997)
- Seeing Things (01/03/1998)
- The Pits (01/17/1998)
- Calisthenics (01/31/1998)
- President's Day (02/14/1998)
- Seating Chart (02/21/1998)
- Film Strip (02/28/1998)
- Mahoot's Cousin (03/07/1998)

=== Season 2 (1998) ===
- Chemical Reaction (09/05/1998)
- Wild Blue Yonder (09/12/1998)
- Exchange Student (09/19/1998)
- Career Day (09/26/1998)
- Creative Movement (09/26/1998)
- Art Museum (10/03/1998)
- Fire Drill (10/10/1998)
- Aquarium (10/17/1998)
- Bake Sale (10/24/1998)
- Class Computer (10/24/1998)
- Class Pet (10/31/1998)
- Make-Over (11/07/1998)
- Tallest Building (11/14/1998)
- Simmer Minute (11/21/1998)
- Gerald the Gerbil (11/21/1998)
- Onomatopoeia (11/28/1998)
- Good Will Mahoot (12/05/1998)
- Girls' Room (12/12/1998)
- First Snow (12/19/1998)
