= Pepper Ann =

American animated series

- Genre: Animated sitcom; Slapstick; Satire; Teen comedy
- Created by: Sue Rose
- Based on: Pepper Ann by Sue Rose
- Directed by: Sherie Pollack (season 1); Brad Goodchild (seasons 2–4)
- Voices of: Kathleen Wilhoite; Clea Lewis; Danny Cooksey; Jeff Bennett; Pamela Adlon; April Winchell; Don Adams; Jim Cummings; Susan Tolsky; Tino Insana; Kath Soucie; Cree Summer; Jenna von Oÿ
- Theme music composer: Brian Woodbury
- Composer: Pat Irwin
- Country of origin: United States
- Original language: English
- No. of seasons: 4
- No. of episodes: 65 (113 segments) (list of episodes)

Production
- Executive producers: Sue Rose; Nahnatchka Khan
- Running time: 22 minutes
- Production company: Walt Disney Television Animation (Note: Animation outsourced to Sunwoo Entertainment, with The Hana Animation Company providing animation on three segments.*)

Original release
- Network: ABC Kids; UPN (seasons 3–4); Toon Disney (season 4)
- Release: September 13, 1997 – November 30, 2001 (Note: The series technically ended its run earlier on Toon Disney in September, although the premiere dates for said channel are undocumented.)

Pepper Ann is an American animated television series created by Sue Rose and aired on Disney's One Saturday Morning on ABC. It first premiered on September 13, 1997, and ended on November 30, 2001. It was the first Disney animated television series to be created by a woman.

Tom Warburton, who later created Cartoon Network's Codename: Kids Next Door, served as the lead character designer for the series.

== Overview ==
Pepper Ann centers on the trials and tribulations that occur during the titular character's adolescence and charts her ups and downs at Hazelnut Middle School. The character originated in a comic strip published in YM magazine.

The opening titles depict Pepper Ann, when she sinks under her desk after getting a detention slip from her teacher Roland Carter for being late to class again after heading through the wrong path to get to school while reading a comic, finding a different item each episode such as a $5 bill, kiwi lipbalm, the letter Q, a bicentennial quarter, a glowing green stick, a dreidel, among many other things.

The series, animated by Sunwoo Entertainment, was animated on cels for the first season, before switching to digital ink and paint for the second season in 1998, making it one of the first animated series to use digital animation full-time. For the third season, three segments would be outsourced to a different animation company than the rest of the series, and are the only segments outside of the first season to be cel-animated ("Def Comedy Mom", "The Beans of Wrath" and "Effie Shrugged").

== Episodes ==
Season	Segments (Note: Segment count reflects broadcast; production totals are noted separately.)	Episodes		Originally released		
Season	Segments	Episodes		First released	Last released	Network
1	23	13		September 13, 1997	January 24, 1998	ABC (Disney's One Saturday Morning)
2	25	13		September 12, 1998	January 16, 1999	ABC (Disney's One Saturday Morning)
3	14	26	8	September 11, 1999	January 22, 2000	ABC (Disney's One Saturday Morning)
3	28 (Note: 42 segments total; segments split up per channel.)	26	18	February 6, 2000	February 27, 2000	UPN (Disney's One Too)
4	9	13	5	September 9, 2000	January 6, 2001	ABC
4	5	13	3	November 5, 2000	November 12, 2000	UPN
4	9 (Note: 23 segments total; segments split up per channel.)	13	7 (Note: Disney Channel aired the series in packaging order; 4 miscellaneous segments (whose sister segments were repackaged for ABC or UPN) premiered on the channel, alongside 3 unaired episodes.)	November 15, 2001	November 30, 2001	Disney Channel (Note: First previewed on Toon Disney in syndication, although the premiere dates for said channel are undocumented.)

== Characters ==
=== Main ===
- Pepper Ann Pearson (Note: Promotional material (such as Disney Online) sometimes cites "Pepper" as a nickname with "Jennifer Ann" being her birth name, albeit this was contradicted by early press materials.) (voiced by Kathleen Wilhoite) is the titular protagonist of the series, who is a bespectacled, quirky 12-year-old girl whose emotions come out in fantasies. Her conscience, Alter-Ego, often drives her insecurities through misguided advice. Her mother's side of the family is of Jewish faith, while her father's side is of Christian faith.
- Nicky Anais Little (voiced by Clea Lewis) is Pepper Ann's female best friend, a very intelligent and sensible, yet soft-spoken overachiever, who often serves as a confidant for Pepper Ann. She can be prone to sudden outbursts and struggles to keep her composure when she feels she is overlooked. Being health conscious, Nicky keeps to a pescetarian diet, which she occasionally breaks. She often struggles with her perfectionism, and has a phobia of swans.
- Milo Kamalani (voiced by Danny Cooksey) is Pepper Ann's male best friend, a laid-back and mellow artist who prides himself in his artistic "talent". While a bit of a delinquent, Milo is driven by passion, which can sometimes ostracize him from his peers. In early seasons, he is often her partner in crime with her schemes.
- Lydia Pearson (voiced by April Winchell) is the mother of Pepper Ann and Moose and the ex-wife of Chuck. She is a salesclerk working with the fashion store "It's You!" at Hazelnut Mall.
- Margaret Rose "Moose" Pearson (voiced by Pamela Adlon) is Pepper Ann's younger 7-year-old sister with an androgynous appearance and deep voice, whose favorite pastime is skateboarding.
- Craig Bean (voiced by Jeff Bennett) is a "cool" 8th grader whom the 7th graders admire. He serves as Pepper Ann's main love interest, as they both have mutual crushes on each other.

=== Recurring ===
- Dieter Liederhosen (voiced by Jeff Bennett) is a German student in Pepper Ann's class with an articulate appreciation for food.
- Trinket St. Blair (voiced by Jenna von Oÿ) is a spoiled, rich, popular girl who often serves as a foil to Pepper Ann.
- Cissy Rooney (voiced by Kath Soucie) is Trinket's best friend. She is considered the most popular girl in 7th grade, and bears a clueless demeanor.
- Tessa and Vanessa James (both voiced by Cree Summer) are black twin sisters who run the school's paper "Hazelnuts N Bolts". Tessa is more outgiong while Vanessa is more reserved; the pair have a tendency of finishing each other's sentences.
- Janie Lilly Diggity (voiced by Susan Tolsky) is the aunt of Pepper Ann and Moose, being Lydia's younger sister. A former member of the Peace Corps, she spends her time as an activist.
- Jo Jo Diggity (voiced by Tino Insana) is Pepper Ann and Moose's uncle and Janie's husband, who works as a cop.
- Nedward "Ned" Diggity (voiced by Jeff Bennett) is the socially inept son of Janie and Jo Jo, Lydia's nephew, and Moose and Pepper Ann's cousin, whom P.A. is embarrassed of. Ned has an affinity for cheese.
- Lillian Lilly (voiced by April Winchell) is the mother of Lydia and Janie, and Pepper Ann's grandmother. In her youth, she used to be a performer and actress.
- Leo Lilly (voiced by Jeff Bennett) is Lillian's husband and Pepper Ann's grandfather.
- Peter "Pink-Eye Pete" Ogilvy (voiced by Jeff Bennett) is a nerdy kid who suffers from pink eye.
- Alice Kane (voiced by Lauren Tom) is Pepper Ann's pompous (sometimes egomaniacal) academic rival. She presents a superficially mature attitude in spite of being just as competitive as Pepper Ann.
- Gwen Mezzrow (voiced by Kimmy Robertson) is a bubbly girl who constantly alternates between pining for Milo and being entirely uninterested in him in favor of Dieter, who is indifferent to her affection.
- Stuart Walldinger (voiced by Luke Perry in Season 2 and Cam Clarke from Season 3 onwards) is Nicky's bookish boyfriend, whose main hobby is RC car-racing. He holds a reserved attitude but has a tendency to act out and bottle his emotions.
- Constance Goldman (voiced by Candi Milo) is a shy, awkward girl who looks up to Pepper Ann.
- Shelf McClain (voiced by Jeff Bennett) is a large, academically stunted Scottish student in Pepper Ann's class who bullies other students and steals their lunch money.
- Chuck Pearson (voiced by Maurice LaMarche) is the estranged ex-husband of Lydia and father of Pepper Ann and Moose. He works as a blimp pilot and speaks with a Mid-Atlantic accent.
- Sherrie Spleen (voiced by April Winchell) is the TV anchorwoman for Channel 96 in Hazelnut.
- Supermodel Mindy (voiced by Kath Soucie) is an airheaded celebrity and host of several popular Hazelnut television shows.
- Mick Snot, real name Harry Schnitzer (voiced by Jess Harnell & Rob Paulsen) is the frontman of the band Flaming Snot. He went to the same Community College as Lydia prior to forming his band; Harry's fame has caused a strain between their friendship.
- Mitch (voiced by Jeff Bennett) is the owner of "It's You!", the clothing store in which Lydia works at. Mitch has a tendency to be high strung and often takes Lydia for granted.
- Milicent the Militant (voiced by April Winchell) is an officious army woman who is very no-nonsense and narrow-minded when it comes to Pepper Ann.
- Emmit Swink (voiced by Max Casella & Jeff Bennett) is the owner of BrainDead arcade and a waiter at Greezy N' Cheezy, a pizzeria often visited by Pepper Ann and her friends.
- Margot Lesandre (voiced by Kathy Najimy) is a snooty langerie saleswoman who is rivals with Lydia and Janie.
- "Shouty Kid" Sean Lesandre (voiced by Pamela Adlon) is the son of Margot, and Moose's crush. He is most recognizable for his booming voice.
- Crash (voiced by Adam Wylie) is Moose's neurotic best friend, whose name Pepper Ann never remembers.
- Crying Girl (typically voiced by Cree Summer & Kath Soucie) is an unfortunate girl who often breaks down in tears at the slightest mishap, most often Pepper Ann's misadventures.
- Sketch (voiced by Karen Duffy) is an 8th grader whom Pepper Ann admires for her "coolness". She values loyalty but is shown to be somewhat aloof.

=== Minor ===
- Steve the Cat is the Pearson family's cat, brought in by Lydia to help Pepper Ann deal with the birth of Moose. Following the departure of Supermodel Mindy, he was made the temporary mascot of the Channel 96 Lotto show, succeeded by Dieter after he returned to the Pearson family.
- Mrs. and Mr. Little (voiced by Kath Soucie & Jim Cummings respectively) are the parents of Becky and Nicky. While supportive, they are often ignorant of their daughters' best interests. Mrs. Little often picks Nicky up from school and is a defense attorney, while Mr. Little is a stockbroker.
- Kona Kamalani (voiced by Nicole Sullivan) is the mother of Milo Kamalani. She runs a catering business, having moved to Hazelnut with Milo following her divorce.
- Dirk (voiced by Jim Cummings) is Milo's stepfather and Kona's husband. Dirk is overeager to connect with his stepson.
- Lamar Abu-Dabe (voiced by Kenny Blank) is a 7th grader and a classmate of Pepper Ann's whom Constance has a crush on.
- Brenda (voiced by Tara Strong) is Pepper Ann's former best friend. She is bubbly and overbearing to the point that Pepper Ann finds her insufferable.
- Mama Tried Guy (voiced by Jim Cummings) is a temperamental student nicknames after his large heart tattoo on his arm.
- Hush (voiced by Pamela Adlon) is a mute 8th grader who is friends with Sketch. She has a begrudging respect for Pepper Ann.
- Tank & Poison (voiced by Brittany Murphy & Meredith Scott Lynn) are carefree, nonchalant 8th graders who are friends with Sketch.
- Noah (voiced by Jeff Bennett), nicknamed "Hacky Sack Boy" is a dim 7th grader who comes around to Milo after dismissing his sensitivity.
- Amber O'Malley (voiced by Jodi Benson) is a temporary transfer student from HMS, known as the Locker Bandit for stealing items from student's lockers.
- Wayne Macabre (voiced by Wallace Langham) is an 8th grade critic whose opinionated and misogynistic comments put him at odds with Pepper Ann.
- Joaquim Sanchez (voiced by Jason Marsden in Season 2 and Mario Lopez in Season 4) is a student who attends the private school "Our Lady of Walnut". He once mistook Pepper Ann for Didi O'Shaughnessy, who was an exact match of Pepper Ann; he would later invite Pepper Ann to a spring dance, alongside Bud and Craig.
- Mean Girl (voiced by Kath Soucie) is a social climbing punk who often brings trouble to Pepper Ann.
- Effie Shrugg (voiced by Hedy Burress) is an intellectual 8-year-old girl who uses her brawn and large size to intimidate others.
- Bud (voiced by Jason Marsden) is a member of the HMS football team who once had a crush on Pepper Ann, after her stint as the only girl on the team.
- Becky Little (voiced by Glenne Headly) is the older sister of Nicky Little. Like her sister, Becky is academically strong and shares a fear of swans.
- Alf (voiced by Will Ferrell) is the leader of the HMS chess club.
- Mrs. Liederhosen (voiced by April Winchell) is the mother of Dieter. She moved to Hazelnut in an exchange program as a surgeon and helped deliver Moose during her birth.
- Larry (voiced by Alex Rocco) is an out of touch executive responsible for running Channel 96. He is aided by his assistant Davis (voiced by Rob Paulsen).
- Avery Blake (voiced by Jeff Bennett) is the host of Lafftown USA, a Hazelnut television program which showcases humorous incidents which occur throughout the town.
- Cameron Landisberg (voiced by John O'Hurley) is a film director who challenged Pepper Ann to create her own film after she gave his a poor review in the school paper.
- Estelle Sommers (voiced by Edie McClurg) is a representative of several Women-led charity groups and organizations, and is a friend of Janie's.
- Mayor Kim (voiced by Clyde Kusatsu) is the mayor of Hazelnut, who is most often seen officiating public events or ceremonies.
- Bernie Guberstein (voiced by Travis Tritt and Jeff Bennett) is a country dancer whom Lydia briefly dated. He went by the stage name "Tex Yokel" and led dance classes, despite coming from Brooklyn.
- Mama Destructo (voiced by Kathy Kinney) is a popular wrestler. She once subbed for Ms. Stark but proved to be a poor math teacher, opening a wrestling camp instead. She later becomes a security guard for the President.
- The Cutie Magootie Boys (voiced by Jeff Bennett, Rob Paulsen & Danny Cooksey) are a five-person boy band group which Pepper Ann once bought standees of. To her chagrin, the standees kept lecturing her through song.
- Fuzzy (voiced by Sue Rose) is a fictional cartoon hairball popular within Hazelnut who stars in a series of comics, television shows, stage plays and theme parks.
- Klaus (voiced by Russi Taylor) is a German cartoon monkey which Dieter is a fan of.
- Tundra Woman (voiced by Nicole Sullivan) is a fictional heroine whom Moose admires for her selflessness and courage.
- Mark Hamill is a celebrity who often visits Hazelnut. He was elected class president of HMS and would later appear as a guest (after being elected President of the United States) for a HMS reunion.
- Evel Knievel was a daredevil whom Moose campaigned for to receive his own statue in Hazelnut's Lupkin Park; Patrick Swayze received one instead.
- Alex Trebek was the host of Jeopardy! and was once recruited by Pepper Ann for a heist. He would eventually marry Lydia Pearson and become the stepfather of Moose and Pepper Ann.

=== Hazelnut Middle School ===
- Principal Herbert Hickey (voiced by Don Adams) is the school's tough disciplinarian with zero tolerance for Pepper Ann's shenanigans, although he often lets his paranoia blow things out of proportion. His distinctive feature is a wart on his face with a hair growing out of it. This was Adams's final role before his death in 2005.
- Ms. Vera Schwartz (voiced by Paddi Edwards) is the school's secretary, who often serves as a voice of reason for Principal Hickey or Pepper Ann. She is widowed and lives by herself with a bundle of cats. Her late mother, nicknamed "Old Lady Groober", used to heckle Pepper Ann whenever she attempted to sell her anything, despite secretly being fond of her.
- Mr. Roland Carter (voiced by Jim Cummings) is a science teacher who is passionate about what he teaches. He is known for giving Pepper Ann detention slips as she often arrives late to class, but he does believe that she is a good student, in spite of her tardiness and occasional schemes.
- Ms. Abriola Stark (voiced by April Winchell) is the math teacher who is also in charge of the drama club. She is very passionate about her plays and can be feisty with other teachers.
- Ms. Bronte Bladdar (voiced by Bebe Neuwirth) is a stoic English teacher (who often substitutes for art teacher Ms. Ford) who speaks in deadpan-monotone mannerisms. She holds very little interest in regards to any drama within the seventh grade.
- Mr. Sherm Finky (voiced by Don Lake) is the social studies teacher. He presents a hip (if not out-of-touch) demeanor, but is no-nonsense when it comes to shirking projects.
- Ms. Carlotta Sneed (voiced by Julia Sweeney) is the economics teacher who positions herself as a mentor to her students, particularly Pepper Ann. Her main hobby is knitting, but she has an affinity for Baggy Bean Buddies.
- Mr. Owen Clapper (voiced by James Avery) is the music teacher. He tends to clash with Ms. Stark concerning school plays.
- Senorita Vivas (voiced by Maria Canals-Barrera) is the Spanish elective teacher during Pepper Ann's spring semester, whom she encourages to step outside of her comfort zone.
- Mr. Reason (voiced by Kurtwood Smith) is the stern woodshop teacher. His tough love approach often rubs his students the wrong way.
- Coach Doogan (voiced by Kathy Najimy) is the physical education teacher, and the head of the school's soccer team, having left a convent for the job. She is supportive, but stern when needed.
- Coach Bronson (voiced by Tom Wilson) is the football coach, who elected Pepper Ann to join the team after seeing how excellent of a kicker she was.
- Nurse Oomla (voiced by Ellen Cleghorne) is the Jamaican-accented school nurse.
- Moira the Lunch Lady (voiced by Sue Rose) is a maladjusted lunchlady with low standards for sanitation.
- Ernie the Janitor (voiced by Jeff Bennett) is the absent-minded, albeit sociable janitor of HMS.

== Broadcast and home media ==
Pepper Ann was aired as part of the Disney's One Saturday Morning block on ABC from 1997 to 2001. Select new episodes of the show's third and fourth seasons were also shown (alongside reruns of previous episodes) on Disney's One Too in syndication (and UPN) during the 2000–01 seasons, during the months of February and November 2000, respectively.

Starting on September 3, 2001, the series began syndication through Disney Channel, and also joined Toon Disney alongside Disney's Doug on an hour-long primetime block called The Magical World of Toons. Previously unaired episodes that had never aired on ABC or UPN made their premiere throughout early September on Toon Disney, and November 15–30 on Disney Channel.

The series remained in syndication on Disney Channel until September 8, 2002. While Pepper Ann would leave regular syndication on Toon Disney in 2004, the show received a few marathons throughout 2007 and 2008 after being off the air for a few years, with the final one being played on July 20, 2008, the last time the show was broadcast on US television.

All 65 episodes of the series were included on Disney+ on September 8, 2021 in the United States, with the episodes from season 4 listed under season 3 on the platform (due to them being produced concurrently), along with the episodes initially being listed in their package order. (Note: As of late 2024, the episodes listed under Season 3 were reordered from the initial order present from when the show was first added.)

Internationally, the show aired on GMTV in the UK and RTÉ in Ireland.

=== Broadcast discrepancies ===
In 2003, following the show's original run, several TV sites would misorder the series based off its broadcast order, with certain episodes being mistitled or paired in reverse, and the show's third season (which was aired between ABC and UPN) split into two separate seasons. Due to the lack of sources available at the time, several sites erroneously cite several episodes from the fourth season (often cited as the fifth season) being broadcast from November 13-18, 2000. This has been debunked by contradictory airdates from TV guides and newspaper listings of the time citing earlier episodes airing in place of the presumed premieres.

== Scrapped film ==
In 1999, an animated film based on the series was in development at Walt Disney Television Animation and Walt Disney Pictures under the name Pepper Ann's Rio Adventure. The movie would have followed Pepper Ann's soccer team being invited to Rio de Janeiro as part of an event where they try to stop a land developer from deforesting the Amazon rainforest. The movie was scrapped for unknown reasons, however concept art of the film by animation director Richard Bowman was posted onto eBay in recent years, the most recent piece being posted in July 2024. It is unknown whether or not the film was intended to be theatrical or made for television.
