= The Weekenders =

American animated television series

- Opening credits logo
- Also known as: Disney's The Weekenders
- Genre: Comedy
- Created by: Doug Langdale
- Directed by: Steve Lyons
- Voices of: Grey DeLisle; Lisa Kaplan; Phil LaMarr; Jason Marsden; Kath Soucie
- Opening theme: "Livin' for the Weekend" performed by Wayne Brady
- Composer: Roger Neill
- Country of origin: United States
- Original language: English
- No. of seasons: 2
- No. of episodes: 39 (73 segments)

Production
- Executive producer: Doug Langdale
- Editor: Arthur D. Noda
- Running time: 22 minutes
- Production company: Walt Disney Television Animation

Original release
- Network: ABC (Disney's One Saturday Morning)
- Release: February 26, 2000 – March 17, 2001
- Network: UPN (Disney's One Too)
- Release: September 9 – December 2, 2001
- Network: Toon Disney
- Release: October 19, 2002 – February 29, 2004

Related
- Project G.e.e.K.e.R. Dave the Barbarian

The Weekenders, also known as Disney's The Weekenders, is an American animated television series created by Doug Langdale that premiered on February 26, 2000, with the last episode airing on February 29, 2004, spanning two seasons. It centers on the weekend life of four 12-year-old 7th graders: Tino, Lor, Carver, and Tish. The series originally aired on ABC (Disney's One Saturday Morning) and UPN (Disney's One Too), but was later moved to Toon Disney.

== Premise ==
The Weekenders details the weekends of four best friends: Tino Tonitini, Lorraine "Lor" MacQuarrie, Carver René Descartes, and Petratishkovna "Tish" Katsufrakis. Every episode is set over the course of a weekend, with little to no mentions of school life. Friday sets up the adventure of the episode, Saturday escalates or develops it, and the climatic third act happens on Sunday. The implied "ticking clock" is used to signify the characters running out of time and the problem must be solved before going back to school on Monday. The characters frequent a pizzeria that changes its theme each weekend.

== Characters ==
- Tino Tonitini (voiced by Jason Marsden) is the perceptive, astute, and logical-minded leader of the central group of friends. He serves as the heart of the foursome, maintaining a social awareness that keeps him from being overly nerdy while remaining largely invisible to the truly popular students at school. As the point-of-view character, Tino frequently addresses the audience directly, explaining his experiences, setting up stories, and sometimes pausing the action to speak to the camera or employ visual aids to clarify his thoughts. Langdale described Tino as the window to the world of the show. Marsden found Tino's voice during the audition process after viewing the character's picture and learning he was twelve years old; Marsden intentionally crafted a unique voice for the role that felt authentic to the character, and he contributed input as a writer to preserve Tino's integrity, with his ad-libs often aligning closely with the intended tone.
- Carver Descartes (voiced by Phil LaMarr) is an image-oriented and flamboyant member of the group, representing its closest approximation to hip and popular. Larger than life and focused on fashion and appearance, Carver functions as the "clothes" in the group dynamic, contrasted with Tino as the center, Tish as the brain, and Lor as the body. He exhibits a degree of bored aloofness associated with teenage cool, though it does not fully reflect his true nature; he is the most impatient and arrogant of the friends, yet fundamentally good-natured and prone to mistakes he must learn from. Carver hails from a model suburban family with parents so preoccupied with maintaining appearances that they remain emotionally distant, often failing to engage closely with their children or even recall their names, leading him to rely on his friends for support.
- Lor MacQuarrie (voiced by Grey DeLisle) is an abrasive yet well-meaning tomboy on the verge of discovering her feminine side. Having grown up with several brothers, an environment saturated with testosterone, she developed athletic tendencies, a masculine style of dress, and an assertive, intimidating demeanor necessary to gain attention, while remaining oblivious to her own attractiveness. Despite her fiery personality, Lor is never mean-spirited, and her friends enjoy assisting her gradual exploration of femininity, albeit to a limited extent.
- Petratishkovna “Tish” Katsufrakis (voiced by Kath Soucie) is the quick-witted and academic member of the group. She shifts rapidly between successive obsessions and aspirations (such as dancer, poet, or art historian) with inspired but sometimes alarming speed. Genuinely intelligent and well-read, Tish occasionally becomes detached from everyday reality, assuming others share her familiarity with advanced literary or artistic concepts like Beowulf or the term "mise-en-scène." Her cerebral focus can diminish her physical coordination, leading to mishaps such as walking into objects while absorbed in her reading.
- Tino's Mom (voiced by Lisa Kaplan) is a single parent whose actual name is never revealed in the series. She treats her son Tino roughly as an equal, applying a New Age approach to health and nutrition (such as preparing seaweed sandwiches or tofu-based dinners) while providing sensible, down-to-earth advice when required. To the children, she appears somewhat wacky on the surface, yet they appreciate her as a voice of reason, experience, and honesty.
- The Pizza Guy (voiced by Jeff Bennett) is the unnamed proprietor of the local pizzeria that serves as the friends' favorite hangout. The establishment changes its name and thematic décor each week (examples include the pirate-themed "Pizzas of Eight," the science-fiction-oriented "Deep Dish Nine," and the action-oriented "Mission Impizzable") while the menu remains consistent. The Pizza Guy enthusiastically adopts costumes and personas matching each weekly theme, often becoming carried away with his roles.
- Coach Ned Colson (voiced by Phil LaMarr) is a middle school gym teacher. LaMarr developed his voice as a Chicago-accented blend of Charlton Heston and Ralph Kramden.

== Production ==
The series takes place in the fictional city of Bahia Bay, California ("Bahia" is Spanish for "bay"), which is based on San Diego, California where the creator lived.

== Theme music ==
The show's theme song, "Livin' for the Weekend", was performed by Wayne Brady and written by Brady and Roger Neill.

== Episodes ==
=== Series overview ===
All episodes were directed by Steven Lyons.

Season	Episodes		Originally released		
Season	Episodes		First released	Last released	Network
1	13		February 26, 2000	November 11, 2000	ABC
2	26	8	January 13, 2001	March 17, 2001	ABC
2	26	13	September 9, 2001	December 2, 2001	UPN
2	26	5	October 19, 2002	February 29, 2004	Toon Disney

=== Season 1 (2000) ===
All episodes of this season have a copyright date of 2000.

No. overall	No. in season	Title	Written by	Original release date	Prod. code	Packaging code
1	1	"Crush Test Dummies"	Doug Langdale Sam Kass & Sharon Lee Watson	February 26, 2000	1C10-002	ABC-101
1	1	"Grow Up"	Doug Langdale Sam Kass & Sharon Lee Watson	February 26, 2000	1C10-003	ABC-101
Lor is in love with Thompson, and Carver thinks that she's talking about him. When Tino is caught bouncing on a bouncy house, he becomes determined to be older and mature. Trouble ensues when Carver and Lor get annoyed with his new maturity (minus an easily impressed Tish). Pizzeria Theme: "Franken Pizza"
2	2	"Shoes of Destiny"	Doug Langdale Lance Kinsey	March 4, 2000	1C10-001	ABC-102
2	2	"Sense and Sensitivity"	Doug Langdale Lance Kinsey	March 4, 2000	1C10-006	ABC-102
Carver wants to stand beside the cool kids on picture day and his new shoes help him be "C.A.R.P.". Pizzeria Theme: "Pizzas of Eight" When Lor disappoints her friends, she tries to be nice to make up for it. Pizzeria Theme: "Paris Pizza"
3	3	"The Perfect Weekend"	Evan Gore & Heather Lombard Larry Spencer	March 11, 2000	1C10-005	ABC-103
3	3	"Throwing Carver"	Evan Gore & Heather Lombard Larry Spencer	March 11, 2000	1C10-013	ABC-103
Tino plans out the perfect weekend, but his friends bail out. Pizzeria Theme: "War and Pizza" Tish takes an art class at the museum and makes an ugly statue of Carver. Carver himself, and the others try to keep their mediocre reviews to themselves. Pizzeria Theme: "Pizzanaut"
4	4	"home@work"	David Warick & Amy DeBartolomeis Jonathan Rosenthal	March 18, 2000	1C10-004	ABC-104
4	4	"To Be or Not to Be"	David Warick & Amy DeBartolomeis Jonathan Rosenthal	March 18, 2000	1C10-008	ABC-104
Lor needs her friends to help her pass an upcoming test or face going to military school. Pizzeria Theme: "Pizza Pilot" When Tish's friends make fun of Shakespeare, she stops hanging out with them. Pizzeria Theme: "Platypus Pizza"
5	5	"Sitters"	Rachel Powell Steve Atinsky & Dan O'Connor	March 25, 2000	1C10-012	ABC-105
5	5	"Band"	Rachel Powell Steve Atinsky & Dan O'Connor	March 25, 2000	1C10-015	ABC-105
Carver's mom and dad go to a conference, so Carver has to babysit his little brother Todd. Pizzeria Theme: "Hula Pizza" Carver lies that Chum Bukket will dedicate the show to him and his friends. Pizzeria Theme: "Pizzamergency"
6	6	"Makeover"	Sharon Lee Watson Sam Kass	April 1, 2000	1C10-010	ABC-106
6	6	"The New Girl"	Sharon Lee Watson Sam Kass	April 1, 2000	1C10-011	ABC-106
Lor gets asked out by Thompson and gets a whole new makeover by two girly girls. Pizzeria Theme: "The Great Wall of Pizza" Tish's mom tries to become Americanized by hanging out with her friends. Pizzeria Theme: "Pizza Farm"
7	7	"Party Planning"	Dan O'Connor & Steve Atinsky Evan Gore & Heather Lombard	April 22, 2000	1C10-009	ABC-107
7	7	"Pudding Ball"	Dan O'Connor & Steve Atinsky Evan Gore & Heather Lombard	April 22, 2000	1C10-021	ABC-107
The gang gets invited to a party. It turns out to be clownless and they have to know each other's gender. Pizzeria Theme: "Pizza of Mind" The gang competes in a pudding throwing contest, but aggression and competing go near the heads of the gang. Pizzeria Theme: "Deep Dish Nine"
8	8	"Dead Ringer"	Brian Palermo Rachel Powell	May 6, 2000	1C10-007	ABC-108
8	8	"Carver the Terrible"	Brian Palermo Rachel Powell	May 6, 2000	1C10-018	ABC-108
Tino tries not to look like a geek while playing horseshoes. Carver's classmates thinks he's a bully when they see him trip on Laird.
9	9	"Radio Drama"	Evan Gore & Heather Lombard Sam Kass	September 9, 2000	1C10-014	ABC-109
9	9	"The Tradition"	Evan Gore & Heather Lombard Sam Kass	September 9, 2000	1C10-019	ABC-109
Tish gets bossy over a radio contest. Pizzeria Theme: "Pizza Pie'oneer" Tish must study for a coming-of-age ceremony. Pizzeria Theme: "We the Pizza"
10	10	"To Each His Own" (Note: Working title: "Each to His Own")	Larry Spencer Japhet Asher	September 16, 2000	1C10-020	ABC-110
10	10	"Diary"	Larry Spencer Japhet Asher	September 16, 2000	1C10-022	ABC-110
Each member of the gang wants to go to events that cater to their interests. Pizzeria Theme: "The Pizza's Court" Carver, Tino, and Lor think that Tish is moving after "accidentally" reading her diary. Pizzeria Theme: "ShakesPizza"
11	11	"The Invited"	Doug Langdale Evan Gore & Heather Lombard	September 23, 2000	1C10-016	ABC-111
11	11	"Real Fake"	Doug Langdale Evan Gore & Heather Lombard	September 23, 2000	1C10-023	ABC-111
Tino and Tish secretly get ready for a costume party, that Lor and Carver aren't invited to. The group gets filmed for a movie and emulate TV characters when they think their normal selves are too boring. Pizzeria Theme: "Slice Capades"
12	12	"Super Kids"	Sam Kass Japhet Asher	November 4, 2000	1C10-024	ABC-112
12	12	"Crevasse of Dreams"	Sam Kass Japhet Asher	November 4, 2000	1C10-017	ABC-112
After a seminar, everyone tries to do something meaningful with their weekends. Pizzeria Theme: "Amazing Pizzerini" Tino remembers a former hang-out spot and tries to convince the gang of its existence. Pizzeria Theme: "Paleolithic Pizza"
13	13	"Dixon"	Doug Langdale	November 11, 2000	1C10-025	ABC-113
13	13	"Dixon"	Doug Langdale	November 11, 2000	1C10-026	ABC-113
An amusement park is re-opening and the gang tries to earn tickets while Tino frets about his mom's upcoming date, but after finding out his mom's date, Dixon, is cool, Tino tries to make sure they get together. Pizzeria Theme: "Mission: Impizzable"

=== Season 2 (2001–04) ===
All episodes of this season have a copyright date of 2001.

No. overall	No. in season	Title	Written by	Original release date	Prod. code	Packaging code
14	1	"Taking Sides"	Jonathan Goldstein Doug Langdale	January 13, 2001	1C10-1XX	ABC-114
14	1	"To Tish"	Jonathan Goldstein Doug Langdale	January 13, 2001	1C10-1XX	ABC-114
Tino and Carver get into a fight which splits the group in two. Tish's name becomes a slang term and it really bugs her to the max. Pizzeria Theme: "Sherlock Pizza"
15	2	"Tickets"	Larry Spencer Doug Langdale	January 27, 2001	1C10-1XX	ABC-115
15	2	"Vengeance"	Larry Spencer Doug Langdale	January 27, 2001	1C10-1XX	ABC-115
Tino wins 2 tickets to a Chum Bukket concert and he has a tough time deciding which of his friends to take. Pizzeria Theme: "Surreal Pizza" Carver seeks revenge, after being tricked by a girl at school. Pizzeria Theme: "Prison Pizza"
16	3	"Murph"	Evan Gore & Heather Lombard Doug Langdale	February 3, 2001	1C10-1XX	ABC-116
16	3	"Uncool World"	Evan Gore & Heather Lombard Doug Langdale	February 3, 2001	1C10-1XX	ABC-116
Tino worries that people don't like him. Pizzeria Theme: "Mount Pizza-Uvius" When one of the cool kids stops being cool, the gang helps her get accustomed to being uncool. Pizzeria Theme: "Cirque du Pizza"
17	4	"My Punky Valentine"	Doug Langdale David Warick & Amy DeBartolomeis	February 10, 2001	1C10-1XX	ABC-117
17	4	"Brain Envy"	Doug Langdale David Warick & Amy DeBartolomeis	February 10, 2001	1C10-1XX	ABC-117
Tino has a crush on the punk girl and his friends try to "un-crush" him. In addition, the gang also has a run-in with Jennifer Love Hewitt. Pizzeria Theme: "Pizza! The Musical!" Lor is jealous when the boy she likes pays attention to Tish's academics. Pizzeria Theme: "Pizza Aerobics"
18	5	"Tish's Hair"	Peter Gaffney	February 17, 2001	1C10-1XX	ABC-118
18	5	"I Want to Be Alone!"	Peter Gaffney	February 17, 2001	1C10-1XX	ABC-118
Tish gets a new hairdo and the gang is too afraid to tell her it's ugly. Pizzeria Theme: "Pizzaquarium" Tish decides to spend the weekend alone and the gang goes on a mission to discover why. Pizzeria Theme: "Pie Kwan Do"
19	6	"Baskets for Bucks"	Dan O'Connor & Steve Atinsky Susan Leslie	March 3, 2001	1C10-1XX	ABC-119
19	6	"Pru"	Dan O'Connor & Steve Atinsky Susan Leslie	March 3, 2001	1C10-1XX	ABC-119
Lor is under pressure when she must sink three baskets in a row to win money, and thinks that losing will end her friendship with the others. A popular girl makes the gang popular to get back at her friends.
20	7	"Talent Show"	Larry Spencer David Warick & Amy DeBartolomeis	March 10, 2001	1C10-1XX	ABC-120
20	7	"Relative Boredom"	Larry Spencer David Warick & Amy DeBartolomeis	March 10, 2001	1C10-1XX	ABC-120
Lor tries out for the talent show. Tino's super geeky cousin is coming over for the weekend, conflicting his plans to see the new Chum Bukket movie. Pizzeria Theme: "Inflatable Pizza"
21	8	"New Friends"	Evan Gore & Heather Lombard	March 17, 2001	1C10-1XX	ABC-121
21	8	"The Awful Weekend"	Evan Gore & Heather Lombard	March 17, 2001	1C10-1XX	ABC-121
After Tino meets his mom's former best friend, he decides that the differences he has with his friends will only end in tears. Pizzeria Theme: "Lord of the Pies" The gang experiences a terrible weekend, but end up laughing in the end because it's so terrible. Pizzeria Theme: "Black Tie Pie"
22	9	"Crushin' Roulette"	Doug Langdale Larry Spencer	September 9, 2001	1C10-1XX	FO-22 (Note: This episode first premiered on UPN.)
22	9	"Lucky Shoes"	Doug Langdale Larry Spencer	September 9, 2001	1C10-1XX	FO-22
Tish feels left out when she is the only one without a crush, and tries to find the right person. Pizzeria Theme: "Thera-Pizza" Carver loses his lucky shoes, and his confidence with them. Pizzeria Theme: "Discount Pizza"
23	10	"Cry"	Brian Palermo Peter Gaffney	September 16, 2001	1C10-1XX	FO-23
23	10	"The Perfect Son"	Brian Palermo Peter Gaffney	September 16, 2001	1C10-1XX	FO-23
After Tino cries during Romeo and Juliet in class and is made fun of, he decides to give up all his emotions. The lost emotions plan seems to backfire among the gang. Pizzeria Theme: "Pizza Byte" Carver gets jealous when Tino spends the weekend at his house, and his parents seem to like Tino better than him. Pizzeria Theme: "Pizza Spy"
24	11	"Listen Up"	Evan Gore & Heather Lombard David Warick & Amy DeBartolomeis	September 23, 2001	1C10-1XX	FO-24
24	11	"Never Say Diorama"	Evan Gore & Heather Lombard David Warick & Amy DeBartolomeis	September 23, 2001	1C10-1XX	FO-24
The gang becomes Preteen Pals courtesy of Helpers Helping the Helpless, to help kids get over middle school fears, but Carver has a tough time listening and being helpful. Pizzeria Theme: "Leftover Pizza" Lor and Carver are suffering from "Homework Paralysis Syndrome", and Tish and Tino must help them complete their assignment. Pizzeria Theme: "Superhero Pizza"
25	12	"Secret Admirer"	Larry Spencer Peter Gaffney	September 30, 2001	1C10-1XX	FO-25
25	12	"The Lone Wolves Club"	Larry Spencer Peter Gaffney	September 30, 2001	1C10-1XX	FO-25
Carver tries to discover who his secret admirer is, and becomes unhappy when he learns who it is. Pizzeria Theme: "Gladiator Pizza" Tino gets invited to join a super secret and coveted club.
26	13	"The Most Dangerous Weekend"	Evan Gore & Heather Lombard Dan O'Connor & Steve Atinsky	October 7, 2001	1C10-1XX	FO-26
26	13	"Charity Case"	Evan Gore & Heather Lombard Dan O'Connor & Steve Atinsky	October 7, 2001	1C10-1XX	FO-26
Tino becomes paranoid and overcautious, after breaking his arm. Tish decides that the gang should help a girl who seems to be an unpopular loser. Pizzeria Theme: "Pizza Dungeon"
27	14	"Best"	David Warick & Amy DeBartolomeis Evan Gore & Heather Lombard	October 14, 2001	1C10-1XX	FO-27
27	14	"Broken"	David Warick & Amy DeBartolomeis Evan Gore & Heather Lombard	October 14, 2001	1C10-1XX	FO-27
Tino tries to get "Best" designation in the yearbook. Tino lets Carver borrow the scooter Dixon made for him, but Carver breaks it. Carver promises to fix it, but forgets. Tino is reluctant to remind him, because he's worried Carver will accuse him of nagging.
28	15	"Father's Day"	Doug Langdale Peter Gaffney	October 21, 2001	1C10-1XX	FO-28
28	15	"Follow the Leader"	Doug Langdale Peter Gaffney	October 21, 2001	1C10-1XX	FO-28
It's Father's Day this weekend but for Tino, what does Father's Day mean to him since his dad doesn't live with him? Pizzeria Theme: "Night of the Living Pizza" The group can't decide what to do for the weekend, so they decide to make just one friend decide for the whole weekend. Pizzeria Theme: "E.S.-Pizza"
29	16	"Careers"	Peter Gaffney Larry Spencer	October 28, 2001	1C10-1XX	FO-29
29	16	"Tutor"	Peter Gaffney Larry Spencer	October 28, 2001	1C10-1XX	FO-29
The group puzzles over their career test results. Pizzeria Theme: "You Won't Believe It's a Pizza"" Once again, Lor's grades are slipping and she needs a tutor to help her.
30	17	"The Tao of Bluke"	Evan Gore & Heather Lombard David Warick & Amy DeBartolomeis	November 4, 2001	1C10-1XX	FO-30
30	17	"An Experimental Weekend"	Evan Gore & Heather Lombard David Warick & Amy DeBartolomeis	November 4, 2001	1C10-1XX	FO-30
The group has a team challenge called "Bluke". Tish has her mind set on winning a psychology prize.
31	18	"Celebrity"	Doug Langdale	November 11, 2001	1C10-139	FO-31 WEEK-34
31	18	"Celebrity"	Doug Langdale	November 11, 2001	1C10-145	FO-31 WEEK-34
Tish stars in an episode of Teen Canyon and becomes a celebrity, so Carver tries to teach her how to behave like one, but she soon starts to act rude and superior. Pizzeria Theme: "Tish Pizza"
32	19	"Clown"	Larry Spencer	November 18, 2001	1C10-135	FO-32 WEEK-31
32	19	"Testing Dixon"	Larry Spencer	November 18, 2001	1C10-140	FO-32 WEEK-31
Tino tries to cure himself of his coulrophobia. Pizzeria Theme: "Clown Pizza" Tino decides to test Dixon to see if he's stepfather material. Pizzeria Theme: "Alpine Pizza"
33	20	"Croquembouche"	Peter Gaffney David Warick & Amy DeBartolomeis	November 25, 2001	1C10-138	FO-33 WEEK-33
33	20	"Imperfection"	Peter Gaffney David Warick & Amy DeBartolomeis	November 25, 2001	1C10-142	FO-33 WEEK-33
The gang visit a food festival with presentations. Pizzeria Theme "Where's the Pizza?" Tish tries to overcome her perfectionist ways. Pizzeria Theme: "Pizza Lounge"
34	21	"The Worst Holiday Ever"	Evan Gore & Heather Lombard	December 2, 2001	1C10-136	FO-34 WEEK-32
34	21	"The Worst Holiday Ever"	Evan Gore & Heather Lombard	December 2, 2001	1C10-137	FO-34 WEEK-32
The Christmas season approaches, but because each member of the gang celebrates different holidays – Lor celebrates Christmas, Tino celebrates Solstice, Tish celebrates Hanukkah, and Carver celebrates Kwanzaa – they all plan to spend the weekend at Lor's grandmother's farm, but her RV gets stuck in a blizzard.
35	22	"Nevermore"	Evan Gore & Heather Lombard	October 19, 2002	1C10-148	WEEK-37 (Note: This episode first aired on Toon Disney.)
35	22	"Nevermore"	Evan Gore & Heather Lombard	October 19, 2002	1C10-150	WEEK-37
Tino goes through a revenge rampage when his friends won't go trick-or-treating with him and they think they're "too old".
36	23	"Brain Dead"	Evan Gore & Heather Lombard Larry Spencer	November 7, 2003 (Note: This episode first premiered in Canada on Family Channel on November 15, 2002.)	1C10-144	WEEK-35
36	23	"Lor's Will"	Evan Gore & Heather Lombard Larry Spencer	November 7, 2003	1C10-141	WEEK-35
Tish loses her title as "Brain" when she gets a B on a test. Lor has an injury that she thinks may be fatal, so she writes a will for her friends and family, but Tish feels betrayed when she isn't mentioned.
37	24	"Radio Free Carver"	David Warick & Amy DeBartolomeis Larry Spencer	November 14, 2003 (Note: This episode first premiered in Canada on Family Channel on November 18, 2002.)	1C10-146	WEEK-36
37	24	"Dinner Party"	David Warick & Amy DeBartolomeis Larry Spencer	November 14, 2003	1C10-147	WEEK-36
Carver becomes the new DJ of the Bahia Bay Middle School with disastrous results. Pizzeria Theme: "Pizza Spa" Tish hosts a salon party and "invites" Tino, Carver, Lor, and Bluke.
38	25	"Laundry Day"	David Warick & Amy DeBartolomeis Peter Gaffney	November 21, 2003 (Note: This episode first premiered in Canada on Family Channel on November 19, 2002.)	1C10-149	WEEK-38
38	25	"Penny McQuarrie"	David Warick & Amy DeBartolomeis Peter Gaffney	November 21, 2003	1C10-143	WEEK-38
Lor enlists the gang to help her do her family's laundry. Pizzeria Theme: "Ninja Pizza" When Carver's sister Penny is dating one of Lor's brothers, both Carver and Lor get involved. Pizzeria Theme: "You Can Eat a Pizza!"
39	26	"Tino's Dad"	Doug Langdale	February 29, 2004 (Note: This episode first premiered in Canada on Family Channel on November 20, 2002.)	1C10-151	WEEK-39
39	26	"Tino's Dad"	Doug Langdale	February 29, 2004	1C10-152	WEEK-39
Tino's dad is visiting for the first time in 8 years, and he must plan the perfect weekend to bond with his dad. Pizzeria Theme: "Focus Group Pizza"

== Broadcast and home media ==
The series premiered on February 26, 2000, as part of Disney's One Saturday Morning on ABC. From 2001 to 2002, it also aired as part of Disney's One Too on UPN on Sunday mornings. In September 2002, the series moved to Toon Disney, and the remaining episodes would be aired from October 19, 2002, finishing on February 29, 2004; the last four episodes of the series would air in Canada on Family Channel, ahead of their US premieres, in November 2002. Reruns of the series continued to air on Toon Disney from 2004 to 2006, and on Disney Channel in 2003.

In the United States, the entire series is now available on DVD on two volume sets sold exclusively through the Disney Movie Club, which makes The Weekenders the first Disney animated television show to have a full release on DVD. Due to the first-sale doctrine in the United States, the discs can be legally resold and are regularly available from sellers on eBay and other similar sites.

DVD name	Ep #	Release date
The Weekenders: Volume 1	20	March 5, 2013
The Weekenders: Volume 2	19	March 5, 2013

The series was made available to stream on Disney+ on May 25, 2026.

== Reception ==
=== Critical reception ===
The Weekenders has received very positive reviews from critics and fans for its solid writing, upbeat energy and multi-dimensional characters.

=== Ratings ===
TV Guide called The Weekenders as "the show that killed Pokémon", because ABC stole the ratings when they aired it at 10:00 am – the same time Pokémon aired on Kids' WB. In addition, Variety reported that The Weekenders took the number one rating on Saturday morning television, which knocked off Pokémon from its 54 consecutive weeks as the top spot.
