= Lunch Ladies =

American comedy/horror short film

- Movie poster
- Directed by: J.M. Logan
- Written by: Clarissa Jacobson
- Produced by: Rebel Minx J.M. Logan Joe Bratcher Matt Falletta Jessica Janos
- Starring: Chris Fickley; Daisy Kershaw; Mary Manofsky; Donna Pieroni
- Cinematography: Chris Ekstein
- Edited by: Amelia Allwarden
- Music by: Antoni M. March
- Release date: 2017
- Running time: 19 minutes
- Country: United States
- Language: English

Lunch Ladies is a 2017 American comedy horror short film which was created and written by Clarissa Jacobson; produced by Rebel Minx, J.M. Logan, Joe Bratcher, Matt Falletta, and Jessica Janos; and directed by J.M. Logan. It won Film Threat! Best Short, and was screened at Clermont-Ferrand Film Festival in Opening Program and the Tous à Table Section.

== Plot ==
Two sisters, Serretta and LouAnne Burr, are lunch ladies working in a high school called Melvin High. Both are unsatisfied with their job and cook terrible food. Both sisters are fans of the actor Johnny Depp and are hired by him to be his personal chefs after winning a cooking contest. The principal threatens to fire both women if they do not get better at cooking, much to the aggravation of Serretta. Serretta's Johnny Depp t-shirt gets ruined by potatoes after she kicks a container. Furious, Serretta goes to the lady's room to clean off her shirt. After a cheerleader named Alexis insults Seretta, Serretta suffocates her to death with a plunger. Fearing jail, Seretta and LouAnne decide to bake the flesh of the corpse into meat pies, taking inspiration from the Tim Burton film Sweeney Todd: The Demon Barber of Fleet Street. They then give the meat pies to the students and staff who eat them, unknowingly committing cannibalism. The film ends with selfies and videos of Serretta and LouAnne in Hollywood, California.

== Cast ==
- Donna Pieroni (Seretta Burr)
- Mary Manofsky (LouAnne Burr)
- Daisy Kershaw (Alexis the Cheerleader)
- Chris Fickley (Principal Grossfetig)

== Awards and nominations ==
The film was screened at the following festivals:

- Bucheon International Fantastic Film Festival
- Clermont-Ferrand International Short Film Festival
- Flickerfest
- Imagine Film Festival
- Palm Springs International Film Festival
- Santa Barbara International Film Festival

It received the following awards and nominations:

- Rhode Island International Film Festival - won Best Editing
- Strasbourg European Fantastic Film Festival - nominated, Octupus d’Or
- Nightmares Film Festival - won Best Horror Comedy Short
