= Disney's One Too =

American children's programming block

Disney's Animation Weekdays
- Disney's One Too logo used on-air from 1999 to 2002
- Network: UPN
- Launched: September 6, 1999; 26 years ago
- Closed: August 31, 2003; 23 years ago
- Country of origin: United States
- Owner: The Walt Disney Company (programming syndicated by Buena Vista Television)
- Formerly known as: Disney's One Too (1999–2002)
- Sister network: ABC Kids
- Format: Children's programming block
- Running time: 2 hours

Disney's Animation Weekdays (originally known as Disney's One Too until 2002) was an American two-hour weekday and Sunday children's programming block that aired on UPN from September 6, 1999 to August 31, 2003. Marketed as a spin-off of the Disney's One Saturday Morning block on ABC (which is owned by The Walt Disney Company), it featured animated series from Walt Disney Television Animation aimed at children between the ages of 6 and 11.

== History ==
=== Beginning deal with UPN ===
In January 1998, UPN began discussions with The Walt Disney Company (owner of rival network ABC) to have the company program a daily two-hour children's block for the network, airing on weekdays (during the morning and afternoon hours) and Sunday mornings. Attempts to reach a time-lease agreement deal with Disney were canceled one week after negotiations began due to a dispute between Disney and UPN over how the block would be branded and the amount of E/I programming that Disney would provide for the block; UPN then entered into discussions with then-corporate sister Nickelodeon as both networks were owned by Viacom (now Paramount Skydance) at the time to produce a new block, but never came to fruition and Nickelodeon eventually came to an agreement with CBS and Nickelodeon on CBS premiered two years later. That February, UPN entered into an agreement with Saban Entertainment (then a subsidiary of Fox Family Worldwide, which Disney later acquired in 2001 and reunited 18 years later following the merger of 21st Century Fox along a library of children's content), which distributed two live-action series recently aired on the UPN Kids block around that time, Sweet Valley High and Breaker High, to broadcast the Sunday-to-Friday block.

In March 1998, UPN resumed discussions with Disney and the following month, The Walt Disney Company and UPN came to an agreement to provide Disney-produced programs on the network on weekdays (from 7:00 a.m. - 9:00 a.m.) and Sunday (from 9:00 a.m. – 11:00 a.m.). The block was originally announced under the working title Whomptastic to distinguish it from Disney's recently-launched One Saturday Morning block for ABC. However, amid the success of One Saturday Morning, the UPN block was rebranded prior to launch as Disney's One Too, aiming to capitalize on brand awareness.

The block premiered on September 6, 1999, replacing UPN Kids, which closed the day before on September 5 after four years. Compared to the format of One Saturday Morning, One Too varied in that, instead of incorporating hosted segments, short animated segment gags from the series featured in the block (such as DIC's Sabrina: The Animated Series, Doug (revived for Disney) and Recess, all of which, along with a few other series, were originally aired on One Saturday Morning) were normally shown, often preceding the beginning of each program, and after commercial breaks. The block also featured an alternate opening sequence, using more futuristic buildings and a theme similar to that used on One Saturday Morning. Many series previously aired on One Too continued in reruns on two Disney-branded cable TV networks, Toon Disney (now Disney XD) and Disney Channel.

=== Closure of block and syndication ===
In September 2002, the One Too branding was discontinued; although the UPN block did not rebrand (with bumpers and promos simply being made for each individual show starting from the previous year). However, the Disney.com website referred to it under the title Disney's Animation Weekdays as a result of the rebranding of the ABC block from One Saturday Morning into ABC Kids.

In the final season of UPN's weekday morning block, it adds Digimon anime (such as Season 4) after leaving Fox Kids.

The block aired for the last time on August 31, 2003, with the time periods given back to UPN's affiliates, but some stations replaced by short-hour, DIC-added programming. This left UPN as the only "big six" broadcast television network without a dedicated children's programming block (and for the rest of its existence through its shutdown on September 15, 2006, nearly all UPN stations would not air any children's programming), as well as joining PAX-TV (which discontinued its Pax Kids block in 2000) as one of only two major commercial broadcast networks without a children's block. However, PAX, which had recently rebranded to i: Independent Television (now Ion Television) in June 2005, would reverse course in 2006 with the introduction of the short-hour Qubo (which launched on the same day as UPN's shutdown), but it shut down nearly 15 years later (24/7 version only) due to Scripps' acquisition. Additionally, some Fox stations that declined to carry 4Kids TV passed on that block to an affiliate of UPN, The WB, or an independent station, in order for the Fox affiliate to air general entertainment programming or local newscasts on Saturday mornings (for example, WFLD in Chicago moved 4Kids TV's schedule to the co-owned then-UPN affiliate WPWR, while WFLD aired infomercials).

=== Aftermath ===
UPN was not the first "big six" network to remove children's programming: NBC became the first to remove children's series entirely in August 1992, when the network launched a live-action block for teenagers called TNBC; children's programming returned to NBC in 2002, through a time-lease agreement with Discovery Kids. In the years since the block was discontinued, all other major broadcast networks, including UPN successor The CW (sister of the "Big Three" network CBS), would gradually abandon children's programming by selling their respective children's blocks to Litton Entertainment, who produces primarily unscripted E/I content targeted nominally at teenagers (but having an older demographic overall by ratings), or in the case of Fox, removing children's programming entirely. Fox's sister network, MyNetworkTV, has never supplied children's programming as part of its lineup; both networks leave the responsibility of acquiring E/I programming to the affiliates, primarily through the syndicated block Xploration Station in the case of the former.

== Programming ==
- ^{1} Program also aired on ABC prior to the block.
- ^{2} Program aired episode premieres.

=== Disney's One Too ===
==== Original programming ====
Title	Premiere date	End date	Source(s)
Disney's Doug^{1}	September 6, 1999	October 1, 2000	
Recess^{1} ^{2} †	September 6, 1999	September 8, 2002	
Hercules: The Animated Series	September 6, 1999	October 31, 1999	
Pepper Ann^{1} ^{2}	February 6, 2000	September 2, 2001	
Buzz Lightyear of Star Command^{1} ^{2} †	October 2, 2000	September 8, 2002	
The Legend of Tarzan^{2} †	September 3, 2001	September 8, 2002	
The Weekenders^{1} ^{2}	September 9, 2001	September 8, 2002	

==== Acquired programming ====
Title	Premiere date	End date	Source(s)
Sabrina: The Animated Series^{1} ^{2}	September 6, 1999	September 6, 2002	

† - Program transitioned to Disney's Animation Weekdays

=== Disney's Animation Weekdays ===
==== Original programming ====
Title	Premiere date	End date	Source(s)
Recess^{1} ^{2} †	September 9, 2002	August 31, 2003	
Buzz Lightyear of Star Command^{1} ^{2} †	September 9, 2002	August 31, 2003	
The Legend of Tarzan^{2} †	September 9, 2002	August 31, 2003	
Digimon (Note: An umbrella name for Digimon Adventure, Adventure 02, Tamers, and Frontier.) ^{2} ‡	September 9, 2002	August 31, 2003	

† - Program transitioned from Disney's One Too
‡ - Program transitioned from final schedule of Fox Kids

== See also ==
- The Disney Afternoon – a syndicated children's program block that ran from 1990 to 1997.
- ABC Kids – a Saturday morning children's block that ran on ABC from 1997 to 2011.
