= ABC Kids (TV programming block) =

American children's television programming block (1997–2011)

- Network: ABC
- Launched: September 13, 1997; 29 years ago
- Closed: August 27, 2011; 15 years ago
- Country of origin: United States
- Owner: The Walt Disney Company
- Formerly known as: Disney's One Saturday Morning (1997–2002)
- Sister network: Disney's Animation Weekdays
- Format: Defunct Saturday morning children's program block
- Running time: 5 hours (1997–2004); 4 hours (2004–10); 3 hours (2010–11)
- Original language: English

ABC Kids (originally known as Disney's One Saturday Morning until 2002) was an American Saturday morning children's programming block that aired on ABC from September 13, 1997 to August 27, 2011. It featured a mixture of animated and live-action series from Walt Disney Television Animation and Disney Channel, aimed at children between the ages of 6 and 14. This was the first block that showed cable children's channel content on over-the-air television in the United States, the second being Nickelodeon on CBS.

The block regularly aired on Saturday mornings, though certain programs within the lineup aired on Sundays in some parts nationwide due to station preferences for non-educational programming or scheduling issues with regional or network sports broadcasts.

After five years of mainly reruns of programs introduced onto the block prior to the 2007–08 season, ABC decided it would discontinue providing children's programming during the Saturday morning timeslot, and entered into an agreement with Litton Entertainment to program that period; the block closed on August 27, 2011, and Litton's Weekend Adventure, which is structured as a syndication package distributed with virtual exclusivity to ABC's owned-and-operated stations and affiliates, replaced ABC Kids on September 3, 2011.

== History ==
=== Disney's One Saturday Morning ===
Disney's One Saturday Morning logo used from September 13, 1997 to September 7, 2002

The Walt Disney Company purchased ABC corporate parent Capital Cities/ABC Inc. in 1995. The merger was completed the following year, and in the fall of 1996, ABC's Saturday Morning lineup aired the fifth season of Doug (which had been acquired from Nickelodeon that year) the third season of Gargoyles (which had previously aired on The Disney Afternoon), Mighty Ducks, and Jungle Cubs. The following spring, it premiered the original animated series Nightmare Ned and began airing reruns of Ducktales. It was one of two networks at the time that prominently carried Disney programming on Saturday mornings, as CBS also carried Disney cartoons (which were mostly television spin-offs of Disney Renaissance films).

In February 1997, Peter Hastings left Warner Bros. Animation and joined Disney, where he was tasked with overhauling ABC's Saturday morning lineup. Disney CEO Michael Eisner sought to create a Saturday morning block that was different from those carried by its competitors Fox Kids and Kids' WB. Hastings pitched an idea around the concept that Saturday is different from every other day of the week, and the representation of weekdays as buildings. Hastings also proposed the use of virtual set technology; although he knew a bit about it at the time and the technology used was just starting to be developed, Disney and ABC liked the idea. He hired Prudence Fenton as consultant manager and co-executive producer. Together, they sampled virtual set technology at the 1997 NAB Show and chose technology developed by Accom and ELSET. Rutherford Bench Productions, which had previously worked with Disney on other projects, hired Pacific Ocean Post (now POP Sound) to produce the virtual set. The building was initially a drawing of Grand Central Terminal with a roller coaster added but evolved into a towering mechanical structure. Even the interior has similarities such as a central high raised room, with two wings on the left and right sides and another on the south side.

On September 13, 1997, Disney's One Saturday Morning premiered as a two-hour sub-block within the ABC Saturday Morning lineup. It was originally scheduled to premiere the Saturday prior on September 6, but was postponed due to coverage by all U.S. networks of the funeral of Princess Diana. Disney's One Saturday Morning featured two parts: three hours of regularly scheduled cartoons and a two-hour flagship show that included feature segments, comedy skits, and the virtual world which Hastings had proposed, along with new episodes of three animated series: Doug, Recess and Pepper Ann.

Doug, Recess and Pepper Ann were each nominally given 40-minute timeslots. The extended 10 minutes during each show's slot were for One Saturday Morning's interstitial segments, produced music videos and educational features. The live-action wraparound segments were originally hosted by Charlie (portrayed by Jessica Prunell) for the block's first season in 1997, and later by MeMe (Valarie Rae Miller) starting in September 1998 until 2000; the segments also featured an elephant named Jelly Roll (voiced by stand-up comedian and actor Brad Garrett), who served as a sidekick to the human host, while the eccentric Manny the Uncanny (Paul Rugg), host of his own standalone segment where he visited and observed different jobs, made occasional appearances outside that segment. Other interstitials in the block included "Great Minds Think 4 Themselves", profiling historical figures and narrated by Robin Williams reprising his role as the Genie from Aladdin, and "Mrs. Munger's Class", in which a set of school yearbook photos were animated with comedy dialogue, although the segment was pulled from the air due to a lawsuit by some of the people depicted in the original yearbook photos.

Schoolhouse Rock!, a longtime essential of ABC's Saturday morning block since 1973, also aired as an interstitial segment during The Bugs Bunny and Tweety Show (along shorts airing on Nickelodeon until 1999), likewise a carryover from the pre-Disney era, it would continue until ABC's contract with then-AOL Time Warner expired in 2000.

Disney's One Saturday Morning was initially a massive success, beating Fox Kids during its first season to be the most-watched Saturday morning block on broadcast television. It remained competitive in its second season, beating all of Fox Kids' shows except Power Rangers. The third season remained competitive with its broadcast peers on Fox and Kids WB, with The Weekenders being highly rated for the block; the new series defeated the anime show Pokémon to become broadcast television's most-watched Saturday morning cartoon, though all of the broadcast networks had fallen behind Nickelodeon.

The block received a new brand identity in fall 2000; this was followed by the shorts and hosted segments being removed on December 16 in a reformatting of the ABC block. By this time, the interstitials within the block were relegated to bumpers and program promotions. The change proved to be disastrous; by February 2001, ratings had fallen to less than half of its competitors' on Fox, The WB and Nickelodeon. In fall 2001, live-action series were added to the One Saturday Morning lineup with the addition of the "Zoog Hour," an hour-long sub-block featuring the Disney Channel original series Lizzie McGuire and Even Stevens (the sub-block, advertised in promos for Disney's One Saturday Morning promoting the two programs as "powered by Zoog," was named after Disney Channel's weekend programming block at the time, Zoog Disney).

A spin-off of Disney's One Saturday Morning, Disney's One Too, premiered on UPN on September 6, 1999; produced through a time-lease agreement between Disney and UPN, the block aired each weekday (either in the morning or afternoon, depending on the station's preference) and on Sunday mornings, and featured many of the programs shown on One Saturday Morning (including Recess, Pepper Ann and Sabrina: The Animated Series).

=== ABC Kids ===
On July 23, 2001, the Walt Disney Company purchased Fox Family Worldwide, primarily for its Fox Family Channel, which was included in the sale as well as Saban Entertainment, a company in which Fox purchased a 50% interest in 1994. On September 14, 2002, ABC rebranded its Saturday morning block, as a subtle nod to the Fox Kids brand acquired by Disney through its purchase of Fox Family Worldwide, to ABC Kids (as a result of the sale, Fox Kids was discontinued; Fox's children's program lineups would be produced by 4Kids Entertainment until 2008).

The renamed block originally contained a mix of first-run programs exclusive to the block, as well as reruns of several original series from both Disney Channel and Toon Disney. NBA Inside Stuff also began airing on the block as a result of ABC's acquisition of the broadcast television rights to the NBA from NBC (where the series originally premiered in 1990), starting with the 2002–03 season's Christmas Day game; the show continued to air on ABC Kids until 2004. The series premiere of Disney Channel's Lilo & Stitch: The Series was also aired on ABC Kids on September 20, 2003, with a delayed premiere on Disney Channel on October 12, 2003. The new block removed the imagery of the One Saturday Morning era in favor of a sports stadium theme, which, in 2006, was changed to a rock concert design that remained throughout the last five years of ABC Kids.

Through Disney's acquisition of Saban Entertainment, the Power Rangers series moved from Fox Kids to the ABC Kids block. All first-run episodes from the franchise premiered on ABC Kids starting with the second half of the show's Wild Force season (starting with the episode "Unfinished Business"), with the entirety of the Wild Force and Ninja Storm seasons subsequently airing in reruns on ABC Family (the former season aired in part both before the introduction of and during the ABC Family Action Block). However, when Toon Disney and ABC Family jointly launched the action-oriented Jetix block in 2004, Jetix aired all first-run episode debuts of subsequent seasons from Dino Thunder to Jungle Fury, while ABC Kids aired these seasons in reruns. Due to the low ratings of the Jungle Fury season, as well as the merger between Jetix and Toon Disney to form Disney XD in 2009, the RPM season aired exclusively on ABC Kids. After production on RPM had concluded, instead of producing a new season, Disney produced a re-version of the first 32 episodes of Mighty Morphin Power Rangers, which included a new logo, an updated title sequence, comic book-referenced graphics, and extra alternative visual effects. The re-version aired from January 2 to August 28, 2010 (the 17th anniversary of Power Rangers), after which Haim Saban reacquired the franchise and Nickelodeon acquired broadcast rights to the series.

In the 2004–05 season, ABC Kids removed its two remaining original series, Fillmore! and Recess (the latter of which was airing in reruns on the block since it ended in 2001). With the transfer of Walt Disney Television Animation to Disney Channels Worldwide, ABC fulfilled the FCC's three-hour quota by carrying select episodes of Disney Channel live-action comedies and animated series (anywhere between 9 and 13 episodes from a given season) featuring moral lessons or educational anecdotes. The episodes were selected by both the "Standards and Practices" division of the network and any educational consultants who were attached to the shows. The Replacements and Hannah Montana were the last two Disney Channel series to be added to the block in fall 2006. Beginning with the 2007–08 season, ABC Kids programming (with the exception of Power Rangers) became fully automated, putting the same handful of episodes of each show (The Emperor's New School, The Replacements, That's So Raven, Hannah Montana and The Suite Life of Zack & Cody) on a permanent rotation for the block's remaining four years.

=== Closure ===
In March 2010, ABC made the decision to discontinue providing a three-hour block of E/I-compliant, repurposed Disney Channel programming sent to its own stations and ABC affiliates. The network chose to lease out the three-hour timeslot and seek other programmers for an agreement to produce a syndicated block, not for the network, but for each ABC station as the network was turning the E/I responsibility back to local ABC stations.

A month later, ABC's affiliate board announced that it had reached a deal with Litton Entertainment, a production company which produced syndicated programming (including educational programs aimed at youth), to produce six, all-new, original half-hour E/I series exclusively for ABC stations for the 2011–12 season.

The block aired for the last time on August 27, 2011, without any announcement of its closure, and was quietly replaced by Litton's Weekend Adventure the following week on September 3.

== Programming ==
- ^{1} Program also ran on syndication and ABC prior to the block.
- ^{2} Program moved to Toon Disney for episode premieres.

=== Disney's One Saturday Morning ===
==== Original programming ====
===== Animated =====
Title	Premiere date	End date	Source(s)
101 Dalmatians: The Series^{1}	September 13, 1997	September 4, 1999	
Disney's Doug^{1}	September 13, 1997	September 8, 2001	
Recess †	September 13, 1997	September 7, 2002	
Pepper Ann^{2}	September 13, 1997	January 27, 2001	
Jungle Cubs^{1}	September 13, 1997	September 5, 1998	
Schoolhouse Rock!^{1}	September 13, 1997	September 2, 2000	
The New Adventures of Winnie the Pooh^{1}	September 13, 1997	September 7, 2002	
Hercules: The Animated Series^{1}	September 12, 1998	April 24, 1999	
Mickey Mouse Works	May 1, 1999	January 6, 2001	
The Weekenders^{2}	February 26, 2000	January 12, 2002	
Teacher's Pet^{2}	September 9, 2000	September 7, 2002	
Buzz Lightyear of Star Command	October 14, 2000	September 8, 2001	
House of Mouse^{2}	January 13, 2001	August 31, 2002	
Lloyd in Space^{2}	February 3, 2001	September 7, 2002	
Teamo Supremo^{2} †	January 19, 2002	September 7, 2002	

==== Programming from Disney Channel ====
===== Animated =====
Title	Premiere date	End date	Source(s)
The Proud Family †	August 31, 2002	September 7, 2002	

===== Live-action =====
Title	Premiere date	End date	Source(s)
Lizzie McGuire †	September 22, 2001 (Note: Originally scheduled to premiere September 15, 2001, but due to the 9/11 attacks, ABC broadcast an "Answering Children's Questions" special in place, and the premiere was postponed by one week.)	September 7, 2002	
Even Stevens †	September 22, 2001	September 7, 2002	

==== Acquired programming ====
===== Animated =====
Title	Premiere date	End date	Source(s)
The Bugs Bunny & Tweety Show^{1}	September 13, 1997	September 2, 2000	
Science Court / Squigglevision	September 13, 1997	September 2, 2000	
Sabrina: The Animated Series	September 11, 1999	October 13, 2001	
Mary-Kate and Ashley in Action!	October 20, 2001	August 3, 2002	

===== Live-action =====
Title	Premiere date	End date	Source(s)
NBA Inside Stuff † ‡	September 7, 2002		

† - Program transitioned to ABC Kids
‡ - Program transitioned from final schedule of TNBC (Teen NBC)

=== ABC Kids ===
==== Original programming ====
===== Animated =====
Title	Premiere date	End date	Source(s)
Recess †	September 14, 2002	August 28, 2004	
Teamo Supremo^{2} †	September 14, 2002	September 13, 2003	
Fillmore!^{2}	September 14, 2002	February 19, 2005	

==== Programming from Disney Channel/Jetix ====
===== Animated =====
Title	Premiere date	End date	Source(s)
The Proud Family †	September 14, 2002	September 2, 2006	
Kim Possible	September 14, 2002	January 8, 2005	
Kim Possible	April 2, 2005	September 2, 2006	
Lilo & Stitch: The Series	September 20, 2003	September 2, 2006	
W.I.T.C.H.	December 18, 2004 (Note: First aired as an hour-long sneak preview on December 18, 2004, officially premiered on January 15, 2005.)	March 26, 2005	
The Buzz on Maggie	September 17, 2005	January 21, 2006	
The Emperor's New School	January 28, 2006	August 27, 2011	
The Replacements	September 9, 2006	August 27, 2011	

===== Live-action =====
Title	Premiere date	End date	Source(s)
Power Rangers (Note: An umbrella name for Wild Force, Ninja Storm, Dino Thunder, S.P.D., Mystic Force, Operation Overdrive, Jungle Fury, RPM and Mighty Morphin Power Rangers.) ^{2} ‡	September 14, 2002	August 28, 2010	
Lizzie McGuire †	September 14, 2002	September 10, 2005	
That's So Raven	September 20, 2003	August 27, 2011	
Phil of the Future	September 25, 2004	September 2, 2006	
Even Stevens †	February 26, 2005	September 10, 2005	
The Suite Life of Zack & Cody	September 17, 2005	August 27, 2011	
Hannah Montana	September 9, 2006	August 27, 2011	

==== Acquired programming ====
===== Live-action =====
Title	Premiere date	End date	Source(s)
NBA Inside Stuff †	September 14, 2002	August 28, 2004	

† - Program transitioned from Disney's One Saturday Morning
‡ - Program transitioned from final schedule of Fox Kids

=== Purposed programming ===
The following programs were planned to air on Disney's One Saturday Morning/ABC Kids, but did not air on the block.

==== ABC Kids ====
===== Programming from Disney Channel/Jetix =====
====== Animated ======
Title	Planned premiere date	Source(s)
Digimon (Note: An umbrella name for Digimon Adventure, Adventure 02, Tamers, and Frontier.) ‡	November 30, 2002	
Brandy & Mr. Whiskers	September 25, 2004	
American Dragon: Jake Long	Early 2005	
Super Robot Monkey Team Hyperforce Go!	September 17, 2005	

====== Live-action ======
Title	Planned premiere date	Source(s)
Cory in the House	September 2007	

† - Program transitioned from Disney's One Saturday Morning
‡ - Program transitioned from final schedule of Fox Kids

== See also ==
- American Broadcasting Company
- Children's Programming on the American Broadcasting Company
- The Disney Afternoon – a Disney-produced syndicated children's program block that ran from 1990 to 1997.
- Disney's Animation Weekdays – a programming block that aired on UPN from 1999 to 2003 as a successor to UPN Kids.
- List of production companies owned by the American Broadcasting Company
- Mrs. Munger's Class
