= List of Canadian voice actors =

Voice acting is the art of providing voices for animated characters (in animation, video games, puppet shows, radio, audio books, amusement rides, computer programs, etc.)

This is a list of Canadian voice actors/actresses notable for their performances in Canadian, American, British or Japanese animated series.

Eligible for this list: Any Canadian on Wikipedia who has contributed in some way to the voice acting field, whether they are an actor, politician, television personality or any other type of celebrity.

== A ==
- Alistair Abell (Colin MacLeod in Highlander: The Search for Vengeance, Lord Djibril in Gundam Seed Destiny)
- Mark Acheson (Lord Tirek in My Little Pony: Friendship Is Magic, Orion in Class of the Titans, Attuma in Fantastic Four: World's Greatest Heroes)
- Michael Adamthwaite (Kyoji Kasshu in Dynasty Warriors, Ribbons Almark in Mobile Suit Gundam 00, Jay in Ninjago)
- Drew Adkins (Arthur Read from 2012 to 2014)
- Julissa Aguirre (Fina in Skies of Arcadia, Kira in Infinite Space, Ara-o in Sushi Striker: The Way of Sushido)
- Philip Akin (Bishop in X-Men: The Animated Series, Tripp Hansen in Monster Force)
- Tamara Almeida (Axel in Total Drama)
- Melissa Altro (Muffy Crosswire in Arthur, Pippi Longstocking in Pippi Longstocking, Gretchen in Camp Lakebottom)
- Cameron Ansell (Arthur Read from 2004 to 2007)
- Lauren Ash
- Harvey Atkin (Bowser/King Koopa in The Super Mario Bros. Super Show!, The Adventures of Super Mario Bros. 3, and Super Mario World)
- Peter Aykroyd (Elwood Blues in The Blues Brothers: Animated Series)

== B ==
- Ali Badshah
- Caitlyn Bairstow (Suna Light in Mega Man: Fully Charged, Lucky in Super Lucky's Tale)
- Ashleigh Ball (Applejack and Rainbow Dash in My Little Pony: Friendship Is Magic, Plum Pudding in Strawberry Shortcake's Berry Bitty Adventures, Blythe Baxter in Littlest Pet Shop)
- Long John Baldry (Dr. Robotnik in Adventures of Sonic the Hedgehog, Mistle-Toad in Toad Patrol)
- Sonja Ball (Jane Read in Arthur and Postcards from Buster, Gummibär in Gummibär: The Yummy Gummy Search for Santa, Wimzie in Wimzie's House, Polly Esther in Samurai Pizza Cats, Huckle Cat in The Busy World of Richard Scarry, Nai-Nai in Sagwa, the Chinese Siamese Cat, Beauty Stem and Panther Cap in Toad Patrol, Buck in Mega Babies, Gofrette, Elliot Kaufman in Creepschool, Marina and Hedwig in Saban's Adventures of the Little Mermaid, Beanie, Stanford and Nana in My Goldfish Is Evil!, Pinocchio in Pinocchio 3000, Jennyline in Dragon Hunters, Nicole in the Madeline TV specials, also a singer for several theme songs such as The Adventures of the Little Koala, Ovide Video and The Little Flying Bears)
- Heather Bambrick (Mom Tiger in Daniel Tiger's Neighborhood, Koki in Wild Kratts, Naughty Kitty in Atomic Puppet)
- Carl Banas (Head Elf in Rudolph the Red-Nosed Reindeer, Scorpion in Spider-Man, Schaeffer in The Raccoons)
- Emilie-Claire Barlow (Courtney in Total Drama, Theresa in Fugget About It, Mrs. Ridgemount in Stoked, Bunny in Almost Naked Animals, Alice Gehabich in Bakugan Battle Brawlers: New Vestroia and Bakugan Battle Brawlers, Sailor Mars and Venus in Sailor Moon, Chrissy in 6teen, Ellody and Laurie in Total Drama Presents: The Ridonculous Race)
- Kathleen Barr (Queen Chrysalis and Trixie Lulamoon in My Little Pony: Friendship Is Magic, Wheezie in Dragon Tales, Kevin and Marie Kanker in Ed, Edd n Eddy, Isis in Krypto the Superdog)
- Jay Baruchel (Hiccup in How to Train Your Dragon franchise)
- Eric Bauza (Stimpy in Ren & Stimpy "Adult Party Cartoon", Foop in The Fairly OddParents, Belly Bag in Uncle Grandpa, Marvin the Martian in The Looney Tunes Show, Lord Takagami in Dick Figures: The Movie, Greg in Hamsters of Hamsterdale)
- Lawrence Bayne
- Jake Beale (D.W. Read in Arthur (2012–2014), Mike in Mike the Knight, Daniel Tiger in Daniel Tiger's Neighborhood)
- Michael Beattie (Needle in Conan: The Adventurer, Buck and Delaney in The Adventures of T-Rex)
- Sugar Lyn Beard (Chibiusa in Sailor Moon, Nancy in Harry and His Bucket Full of Dinosaurs).
- Samantha Bee (Mom in Creative Galaxy, Stacy in Bounty Hunters)
- Lisa Ann Beley
- Doron Bell (Odie in Class of the Titans)
- Clé Bennett (Chef, DJ, DJ's Mother, Beardo and Leonard in Total Drama)
- Michael Benyaer (Raoul in Sitting Ducks, Bob in ReBoot, Hadji Singh in The Real Adventures of Jonny Quest, Ken in Barbie and the Rockers: Out of this World, Airwave and Scoop in G.I. Joe: A Real American Hero, Kaz Takagi and Praetorious in Exosquad, Stats Hiro and Plato Quinones in Hurricanes, William "Banjee" Castillo in Hot Wheels: World Race, Kanan Jarrus in Lego Star Wars: Droid Tales, Darim Ibn La-Ahad in Assassin's Creed: Revelations, Lt. Draza in Uncharted 2: Among Thieves, Nanib Sahir in Age of Empires III: The Asian Dynasties, Wilhelm in Vampire: The Masquerade – Redemption, Dum Dum Dugan in Marvel Heroes, Mr. Waddles in King's Quest, Tahir in Dying Light)
- David Berni
- Karen Bernstein (Sailor Mercury in the original English dub of Sailor Moon)
- Richard Binsley (Mrs. Brinks in Angela Anaconda, Mouse in My Friend Rabbit, Dr. Marbles in Cyberchase)
- Kirsten Bishopric (Zoycite, Emerald, Kaorinite, Telulu and Badiyanu in the original English dub of the Sailor Moon series)
- Thor Bishopric
- Nicole Bouma (Mint Blancmanche in the Galaxy Angel series, Blossom in Powerpuff Girls Z, Mai in Popotan, Snooky Wookums in Krypto the Superdog)
- Annie Bovaird (Caillou in Caillou (2003–2010))
- Justin Bradley (Eddie in The Little Lulu Show, Jesse McCoy in The Kids from Room 402, Raffi in My Life Me, Arthur Read in Arthur (2001 to 2001), Charley "Zapman" Bones in Mona the Vampire, Tommy in Tommy and Oscar, Manny Escobar in Fred's Head)
- Jay Brazeau
- Daniel Brochu (Buster Baxter in Arthur and Postcards from Buster, Sky in the Cinélume dub of Winx Club, Cousin Percy in Rotten Ralph)
- Trek Buccino (Mike in Mike the Knight)

== C ==
- Sally Cahill (original voice of Ada Wong in Resident Evil (1998–2009))
- Robert Cait (Duke the Golden Retriever in Bush's Baked beans television commercials, Mr. Wilter and Blocky in ChalkZone, Colossus in X-Men: The Animated Series, Fryno in Skylanders)
- Michael Caloz (original voice of D.W. Read in Arthur (1996–1999) and Annie Inch in The Little Lulu Show (1995–1996))
- Jesse Camacho (Dick Wilson in Mother Up!, Binky in Agent Binky: Pets of the Universe)
- Mark Camacho (Lyle in Animal Crackers, Spritz T. Cat, Bucky and Road Runner in Samurai Pizza Cats, Oliver Frensky in Arthur, Carlos in Around the World in 80 Dreams, Harry and Dragon in Potatoes and Dragons, Zösky in Kaput & Zösky, Dad in Rotten Ralph, Gantlos in the Cinélume dub of Winx Club)
- Christian Campbell (Max Steel, Harry in Hamsters of Hamsterdale)
- James Carroll (Norman Deek in Red Dead Redemption)
- Len Carlson (Bert Raccoon and Pigs Two and Three in The Raccoons, Pappy in Rolie Polie Olie, Minimus PU in Atomic Betty, Buzz in Cyberchase)
- Alexandra Carter (Aoi Housen in Infinite Ryvius, Sapphire in Trollz, Magma in X-Men: Evolution, Princess Graciella in Barbie: A Fairy Secret, Rosy in Hamtaro, Nana in Meltylancer, Nicole Candler in Sabrina: Friends Forever, Yagami in Maison Ikkoku, Paradice in Ōban Star-Racers, Momiji the Red Priestess in InuYasha, Kumomo in Mirmo!, Twist in My Little Pony: Friendship Is Magic)
- Aimée Castle (Fiore Brunelli in Star Ocean: Integrity and Faithlessness)
- Maggie Castle (Molly MacDonald in Arthur and Jenny Kolinsky in Todd and the Book of Pure Evil: The End of the End)
- Kim Cattrall (Chloe Talbot in The Simpsons episode "She Used to Be My Girl", The Fourth Simpson Child in The Simpsons episode "O Brother, Where Bart Thou?", Dee in Producing Parker)
- Alexander Cendese (Ted Thompson in Bully)
- Luis de Cespedes (Lupin in Night Hood)
- Michael Cera (Brother Bear in The Berenstain Bears, Josh Spitz in Braceface, Todd in Wayside: The Movie, Barry in Sausage Party)
- Garry Chalk (Optimus Primal and G1 Megatron in Beast Wars, Dr. Robotnik in Sonic Underground, Grounder in Adventures of Sonic the Hedgehog)
- Sarah Chalke (Beth Smith in Rick and Morty, Gina Jabowski in Paradise PD, Mrs. Murawski in Milo Murphy's Law)
- Terry Chen (Rodney Choy in Mary-Kate and Ashley in Action!, Tan in Smuggler's Run 2)
- Juan Chioran (Ramon Molina in Arthur, Lance Boil in Grossology, Sid in Harry and His Bucket Full of Dinosaurs, Doji in Beyblade: Metal Fusion, King Caradoc in Jane and the Dragon, Barry Bullevardo in Iggy Arbuckle)
- Tommy Chong (Yax in Zootopia)
- Emmanuelle Chriqui
- Dameon Clarke (Cell in Dragon Ball, George Kaminski in Case Closed, young Toguro in Yu Yu Hakusho, Scar in Fullmetal Alchemist, Handsome Jack in Borderlands)
- Ted Cole (Tatewaki Kuno in Ranma ½, Chang Wufei in Gundam Wing, Yamcha in Dragon Ball Z, Neil in Class of the Titans)
- Rod Coneybeare (Avalanche in X-Men: The Animated Series)
- Vince Corazza (Tuxedo Mask in Sailor Moon)
- Henry Corden
- Ian James Corlett (Goku in Dragon Ball Z, Ten Cents, Z.B., Otis, Zip, Lord Stinker, Frank and Eddie in Salty's Lighthouse, Commander ApeTrully in Hero 108, Coconuts in The Adventures of Sonic the Hedgehog, Bill in Sitting Ducks, the title character in Mega Man, Spiff in Spiff and Hercules, Andy Larkin in What's With Andy?, Mr. Cramp in The Cramp Twins, Filbert in Pocket Dragon Adventures and many others)
- Alyson Court (Poodle in Almost Naked Animals, Trina Riffin in Grojband, original voice of Claire Redfield in Resident Evil (1998–2012) and Jubilee in X-Men: The Animated Series (1992–1997), Nora in Timothy Goes to School, Megan in The Amazing Spiez, Queen Martha in Mike the Knight)
- Bernard Cowan
- Rob Cowan
- Richard Ian Cox (The title role in InuYasha, Male Ranma Saotome in Ranma ½, Bit Cloud in Zoids: New Century Zero, Quicksilver in X-Men: Evolution, Ian Kelley in Being Ian)
- Steven Crowder (Alan "The Brain" Powers in Arthur)
- Katie Crown (Izzy in Total Drama, Fin McCloud in Stoked, Teresa in Barbie: Life in the Dreamhouse, Mary and Ms. Baker in Clarence, Tulip in Storks, Ivy Sundew in Amphibia)
- Leah Renee Cudmore (Beaver in Franklin, Melody in Stickin' Around, Terri in Miss BG, Chris-Alice Hollyruller in Growing Up Creepie.)
- Peter Cugno (Loogie in Get Ed, Marc in The Amazing Spiez, Clutch in Turbo Dogs)
- Peter Cullen (Optimus Prime and Ironhide in the Transformers franchise, Eeyore in Winnie the Pooh)
- Seán Cullen (Narwhal and Piggy in Almost Naked Animals, Lucius Heinous VII in Jimmy Two-Shoes, Emperor Brainlius III in Oh No! It's an Alien Invasion, Fartor in Grossology, Principal General Barrage in Detentionaire, Blade Stabbington in Grojband, Gus, Nefarious, and Deep Space Dave in Rocket Monkeys, Four, Five, Seven in Seven Little Monsters.)

== D ==
- Michael Daingerfield (Gintoki Sakata in Gintama, Ace Ventura in Ace Ventura: Pet Detective)
- Lisa Dalbello (Various Monsters of the Day in Sailor Moon)
- Tony Daniels (X in Daniel Tiger's Neighborhood, Woody in The Cat in the Hat Knows a Lot About That!, Flippy in JoJo's Circus)
- Lucinda Davis (Layla and Digit in the English dub of Winx Club)
- Andrew Dayton (voice of D.W. Read in Arthur since 2014)
- Stacey DePass (Nikki Wong in 6teen, Iris in Ruby Gloom, Jenny Jerkins in Detentionaire, Sharon Spitz in Braceface (season 3), Mandy Struction in Sidekick, Patsy in Harry and His Bucket Full of Dinosaurs, Crimson and Emma in Total Drama Presents: The Ridonculous Race, Roxy in Miss Spider's Sunny Patch Friends, Sanjay and Jennifer in Captain Flamingo, Edweena in My Friend Rabbit, Bobby in Life's a Zoo, Peggy in Producing Parker)
- Trevor Devall (Dukey in Johnny Test (seasons 5–6), Rocket Raccoon in Guardians of the Galaxy, Pyro in X-Men: Evolution, Mu La Flaga in Mobile Suit Gundam SEED, Hot Dog in Krypto the Superdog, Ravus Nox Fleuret in Final Fantasy XV)
- Chris Diamantopoulos (Mickey Mouse in Mickey Mouse, Master Eon in Skylanders Academy, Green Arrow in Batman Unlimited and Justice League Action, Unicorn in Go Away, Unicorn!)
- Carlos Diaz (Fresco in The Adventures of Leo & Cleo)
- Bruce Dinsmore (David Read and Binky Barnes in Arthur and Postcards from Buster, Mike in the Cinélume dub of Winx Club, Horace in Wimzie's House, Jervis Coltrane and Mr. Hutchins in What's with Andy?, Tubby Tompkins in The Little Lulu Show, Poe in Spookley the Square Pumpkin, Elwood and Principal Block in My Goldfish is Evil)
- Catherine Disher (Jean Grey in X-Men: The Animated Series, Kitty Von Snobtail in Mermicorno: Starfall)
- Peg Dixon
- Sergio Di Zio (Kin Kijura in Grojband, Ripper and Wipeout in Stoked, Terse in Babar and the Adventures of Badou)
- Dianne Doan (Lonnie in Disney Descendants: School of Secrets)
- Brian Dobson (The Thing in Fantastic Four: World's Greatest Heroes, Sky Beak in My Little Pony: Friendship Is Magic, Lex Luthor in Krypto the Superdog)
- Michael Dobson (Blob in X-Men: Evolution, Big Ears in Make Way for Noddy, Bull Dog in Krypto the Superdog, Bulk Biceps and Dr. Cabelleron in My Little Pony: Friendship Is Magic)
- Paul Dobson (Enzo Matrix in ReBoot, Juggernaut in X-Men: Evolution, Wu in Ninjago)
- Cal Dodd (Wolverine in X-Men and Marvel vs. Capcom, Random Virus in Ace Lightning)
- Heather Doerksen
- Marc Donato (Ethan in The Future Is Wild)
- Michael Donovan (Joe Handsome in Johnny Test, Dojo Kanojo Cho in Xiaolin Chronicles, Sabretooth in X-Men: Evolution)
- James Doohan (Montgomery "Scotty" Scott, Arex, and Robert April in Star Trek: The Animated Series)
- Cory Doran (Jimmy in Jimmy Two Shoes, Mike in Total Drama, Andrew Baumer, Captain Ron, and Lance in Stoked, Dabio in Wild Kratts)
- Hannah Endicott-Douglas (Miss BG in Miss BG, Amber in My Friend Rabbit)
- Bruce Dow (Max in Total Drama Pahkitew Island)
- Aaryn Doyle
- Brian Drummond (Streaky the Supercat in Krypto the Superdog, Clyde in Pac-Man and the Ghostly Adventures, various characters in My Little Pony: Friendship Is Magic)
- Laura Drummond
- Barbara Dunkelman (Yang Xiao Long in RWBY, Cosmos in Fairy Tail, ORF in X-Ray and Vav)
- Darren Dunstan (Maximillion Pegasus in Yu-Gi-Oh!, Splinter in Teenage Mutant Ninja Turtles)
- Peter Dyneley

== E ==
- Emily Stranges (Camp Rock Student in Camp Rock 2: The Final Jam)
- Chris Earle (Roger Houston in Rescue Heroes)
- Richard Easton (Nigel in Grand Theft Auto V)
- Jayne Eastwood (My Pet Monster, Birdz, Committed, Little Bear, Tales from the Cryptkeeper, The Busy World of Richard Scarry, Bob and Margaret, Rupert, Babar, Freaky Stories, Atomic Betty, The Care Bears, Roboroach, The Berenstain Bears, Free Willy, Knights of Zodiac, Anatole, Bad Dog, Monster by Mistake, The Neverending Story, Ned's Newt, Pippi Longstocking, Skatoony, Storm Hawks, Redwall, Bob & Doug, For Better or For Worse and Babar and the Adventures of Badou)
- Sarah Edmondson
- Novie Edwards (Leshawna in Total Drama, Jackie in Cyberchase, Serena in 6teen)
- Tom Edwards
- Laurie Elliott
- Matt Ellis (Balthazar in The Little Prince)
- Matthew Erickson (Shinn Asuka in Gundam Seed Destiny, Amuro Ray in Zeta Gundam)
- Kaj-Erik Eriksen (Proto Man in Mega Man: Upon a Star)
- Helena Evangeliou (Bloom in the Cinélume dub of Winx Club seasons 1-3 and Marina Datillo in Arthur)
- Kazumi Evans (Iris in LoliRock, singing voice of Rarity and Princess Luna in My Little Pony: Friendship Is Magic)
- Dylan Everett (Wolfy in Super Why!)
- Jacob Ewaniuk (Nick in The Cat in the Hat Knows a Lot About That!, Junior in Total Drama Presents: The Ridonculous Race)
- Sophia Ewaniuk (Ada and Ida in Ella the Elephant)

== F ==
- Megan Fahlenbock (Gwen in Total Drama, Deets in Get Ed, Jen Masterson in 6teen)
- Kristin Fairlie (Little Bear in Little Bear, Bridgette in Total Drama, Emma in Stoked, Carrie in Total Drama Presents: The Ridonculous Race)
- Shannon Farnon (Wonder Woman in Super Friends (1973–1983), Kim Butler in Valley of the Dinosaurs)
- Tod Fennell
- Alex Ferris (T.D. Kennelly in Martha Speaks (season 1–4))
- Matt Ficner
- Fab Filippo
- Nathan Fillion
- Carrie Finlay (Lily Duncan in Mona the Vampire, Melodine in Potatoes and Dragons, Darcy in the Cinélume dub of Winx Club)
- Noel Fisher (Stan in Hamtaro, Toad in X-Men: Evolution)
- Erin Fitzgerald (Nazz and May Kanker in Ed, Edd n Eddy)
- Peter Flemming (Chuck Greene in Dead Rising)
- Dave Foley (Flik in A Bug's Life, Chris in Dan Vs.)
- David Fox
- Andrew Francis (Lin Chung in Hero: 108, Gil in Johnny Test, Cole in Lego Ninjago: Masters of Spinjitzu)
- Jordan Francis
- Holly Gauthier-Frankel (Fern in Arthur, Sagwa in Sagwa, the Chinese Siamese Cat, Rita in Go Hugo Go, Teri in What's with Andy?, Loulou in Wimzie's House, Julie in Caillou, Flora in Winx Club)
- Don Francks
- Jill Frappier (Luna in Sailor Moon, Mrs. Prysselius in Pippi Longstocking)
- Brendan Fraser (Tasmanian Devil in Looney Tunes: Back In Action)
- David B. Fraser (Grandpa Hino in Sailor Moon)
- Matt Frewer
- Brian Froud (Harold and Sam in Total Drama, Beezy J. Heinous in Jimmy Two-Shoes, Lynch Webber in Detentionaire, Marty in ToonMarty)
- Pat Fry (Boris in Caillou)

== G ==
- Sarah Gadon (Beth in Total Drama, the title character in Ruby Gloom, Alyssa in My Dad the Rock Star)
- Catherine Gallant (Mama Fireplant in Super Mario World, Famine in X-Men: The Animated Series)
- Hubert Gagnon
- Kathleen Gati (Mrs. Thornton in Me, Eloise)
- Jeff Geddis (Reef in Stoked, Devin and Tom in Total Drama Presents: The Ridonculous Race)
- Frank Gehry (appeared as himself in Arthur episode "Castles in the Sky")
- David Gilbert (corporate content, commercials - Blink (an Amazon company) - and many others
- Peter Giles (The Boss in The Life & Times of Tim, Ghazan in The Legend of Korra)
- Edward Glen (Thomas in Thomas and the Magic Railroad, Gordy Rhinehart in Angela Anaconda)
- Marvin Goldhar (Cedric Sneer in The Raccoons, Mr. Weatherbee in The New Archies, Bronto Thunder and Bonehead in Dinosaucers)
- Jen Gould
- Marco Grazzini (Alejandro in Total Drama World Tour)
- Janet-Laine Green (Mother Bear in Little Bear, Wish Bear in The Care Bears, Xayide in The Neverending Story, Void in WildC.A.T.S., Florence in Jacob Two-Two)
- Bruce Greenwood (Chiron in Class of the Titans, Bruce Wayne / Batman in Batman: Under the Red Hood and Young Justice)
- Macha Grenon
- Katie Griffin (Sailor Mars in Sailor Moon, Alex in Totally Spies!, Laugh-a-Lot Bear in Care Bears: Journey to Joke-a-lot, Nina Harper in Braceface, Ruby in Max and Ruby, Sam Sparks in Cloudy with a Chance of Meatballs, Miles and Mary in Total Drama Presents: The Ridonculous Race, Scary Girl in Total Drama Island (2023))
- Nonnie Griffin (Harmony Bear in The Care Bears Movie II: A New Generation. Funshine Bear in Care Bears, Mrs. Pig in The Raccoons)

== H ==
- Paul Haddad
- Abby Hagyard
- Jennifer Hale
- Kevin Hanchard
- Ian Hanlin (Sunburst in My Little Pony: Friendship Is Magic, Lance Richmond in Lego Nexo Knights, Acronix in Ninjago, Ralph in Fruit Ninja: Frenzy Force)
- Elizabeth Hanna (Miss Biscuit in Corn & Peg, Hen in Little Bear)
- Adam J. Harrington (Rob Earle and Patrolman Harvey Keller in L.A. Noire, Tyson Latchford in Battlefield Hardline, Sindri in God of War)
- Jeremy Harris (Len in Ruby Gloom, Thunder in My Friend Rabbit, Porter in The Adventures of Chuck and Friends, Ika Inkblot in Mermicorno: Starfall)
- Laura Harris
- Phil Hartman
- Terri Hawkes (the title character in Sailor Moon, Baby Hugs, Cheer Bear and Shreeky in Care Bears)
- Kay Hawtrey (Grandma Bunny in Max & Ruby, Granny in Little Bear)
- Carter Hayden (Noah in Total Drama, Jordan Buttsquat in Camp Lakebottom)
- David Hayter
- William Healy (voice of Arthur Read in Arthur (2014–2016), Badou in Babar and the Adventures of Badou)
- Tricia Helfer (The Grid in Tron: Uprising, Sarah Kerrigan in StarCraft II: Wings of Liberty, Heart of the Swarm, and Legacy of the Void)
- A. J. Henderson (Ed Crosswire and Grandpa Dave in Arthur, Sharky in Sharky & George, Baloo in Jungle Book Shōnen Mowgli, Tik-Tok in The Wonderful Wizard of Oz, Sammie in The Little Flying Bears, Big Al Dente in Samurai Pizza Cats, Cy in Ovide Video, Flip in Maya the Bee, Max in Flight Squad, Professor Leonard in Tommy and Oscar, Sgt. Folenfant in Night Hood, Gaspard in The Mysterious Cities of Gold)
- Rebecca Henderson (Michelle/Karen in Grand Theft Auto IV and V)
- Saffron Henderson
- Maryke Hendrikse
- David Hewlett (Lance McGruder in Monster Force)
- Mark Hildreth
- Matt Hill (Ed in Ed, Edd n Eddy, Kevin Keene/Captain N in Captain N: The Game Master, Kira Yamato in Gundam Seed and Gundam Seed Destiny, Raphael in Ninja Turtles: The Next Mutation, Ryo Sanada in Ronin Warriors, Carlos in Transformers: Armada, Ironhide in Transformers: Energon, Artha Penn and Dragon Booster in Dragon Booster, Soarin in My Little Pony: Friendship Is Magic)
- Gabriel Hogan (Anderson Anderson in The Dating Guy)
- Arthur Holden (Mr. Ratburn and Bionic Bunny in Arthur, Walt in The Little Flying Bears, Baba Miao in Sagwa, the Chinese Siamese Cat, Frederick Stiles in Daft Planet)
- Mark Holden
- Kallan Holley (JuJu in Creative Galaxy, Skye in PAW Patrol)
- Lauren Holly (Haulie in The Adventures of Chuck & Friends)
- Zane Holtz (George Murphy in L.A. Noire)
- Adrian Hough (Cliff Hanger in Rescue Heroes)
- Cole Howard
- Tracey Hoyt
- Bruce Hunter
- Pam Hyatt (Noble Heart Horse in The Care Bears Movie II: A New Generation, Kaede in InuYasha, Campe and Atropos in Class of the Titans)

== I ==
- L. Dean Ifill (Burn in Get Ed)
- Anthony Ingruber
- Michael Ironside (Darkseid in the DC Animated Universe)
- Tajja Isen (Betty Barrett in Atomic Betty, Jane in Jane and the Dragon, Sam in Franklin and the Turtle Lake Treasure, Sister Bear in The Berenstain Bears, Princess Pea in Super Why!)
- Robert Ito

== J ==
- Andrew Jackson (Rubanoid, Plitheon, Sabator and Phosphos in Bakugan: Gundalian Invaders, Dylan, Wolfurio, Zenthon, Zenthon Titan, Slycerak, Spatterix and Balista in Bakugan: Mechtanium Surge, Doji in Beyblade: Metal Fusion, Rago in Beyblade: Metal Fury)
- Christopher Jacot
- Janyse Jaud (Sarah and Lee Kanker in Ed, Edd n Eddy, Orange Blossom in Strawberry Shortcake's Berry Bitty Adventures)
- Janice Hawke (Pegatrix, Philomena Dusk, Keiko, Researcher, Servant and Maids in Bakugan: Battle Planet)
- Sarah Jeffery (Princess Audrey in Descendants: Wicked World)
- Howard Jerome (Octo in Almost Naked Animals)
- Dallas Jokic (Arthur Read from 2008 to 2012)
- Willow Johnson (Kasumi Tendo in Ranma ½, Lalah Sune in Mobile Suit Gundam, Kikyo in InuYasha, Starlight in My Little Pony Tales)
- Jason Jones (Dad in Creative Galaxy, Nathan in Bounty Hunters)
- Rick Jones (Ralph in Rotten Ralph, Polly Rodger in Donkey Kong Country, Gwizdo and Hector in Dragon Hunters, Maurizio di Mauro and Bubonic Preposteror in Wunschpunsch, additional voices in Stickin' Around, Pig City, Animal Crackers, Anatole, Cyberchase, Pecola, What's with Andy, Gawayn, Spliced, Dumb Bunnies, Sidekick, Erky Perky, and Ned's Newt)
- G. Stanley Jones
- Demetrius Joyette (Rutger in Captain Flamingo, Peter Piper in Super Why!)
- Alessandro Juliani (L in Death Note, Aaron Fox in Nexo Knights)

== K ==
- Diana Kaarina
- Hiro Kanagawa (Gihren Zabi in Mobile Suit Gundam, Mister Fantastic in Fantastic Four: World's Greatest Heroes)
- Athena Karkanis (Anne Maria in Total Drama, Aviva in Wild Kratts, Creepie in Growing Up Creepie
- Lezlie Karls (Tecna in seasons 1-2 of the Cinélume dub of Winx Club)
- Hadley Kay
- David Kaye (Megatron in Beast Wars: Transformers, Optimus Prime in Transformers: Animated, Professor X in X-Men: Evolution, Sesshomaru in InuYasha)
- Peter Kelamis (Goku in Dragon Ball Z, Rolf in Ed, Edd n Eddy, Tail Terrier in Krypto the Superdog)
- Peter Keleghan
- Navid Khonsari (Dwayne/Dwaine in Grand Theft Auto: Vice City and San Andreas)
- Gabe Khouth
- Margot Kidder (Gaia in Captain Planet and the Planeteers)
- Andrew Kishino (Janja in The Lion Guard, Saw Gerrera in Star Wars: The Clone Wars, Kevin in Steven Universe)
- Terry Klassen (Krillin and Guldo in Dragon Ball Z, Jingle in Hamtaro, Hachiemon in Inuyasha, Tusky Husky and Waddles in Krypto the Superdog, Claude and Hercules in Salty's Lighthouse, also serves as a voice director)
- Paul Kligman
- Keith Knight (Lowly Worm in The Busy World of Richard Scarry, Fu-Fu in Sagwa, the Chinese Siamese Cat, Pigface in Ace Rabbit, White Rabbit in The Care Bears: Adventure in Wonderful)
- Matthew Knight (Tom the Cat in Peep and the Big Wide World)
- Corrine Koslo (Rataxes in Babar, Emma Leroy in Corner Gas Animated)
- Michael Kopsa (Char Aznable in Mobile Suit Gundam, Commander Volcott O'Huey in Galaxy Angel, Beast in X-Men: Evolution)
- Tamar Kozlov (Prunella Deegan in Arthur)
- Greg Kramer (Nemo in Arthur)
- John Kricfalusi
- Sean T. Krishnan (Metal Gear Rising: Revengeance, Grand Theft Auto IV, Fallout 4)

== L ==
- Kyle Labine
- Tyler Labine
- Sarah Lafleur (Sailor Uranus in Sailor Moon, Ansa in Land Lock, Trish in Devil May Cry)
- Maurice LaMarche (Chief Quimby in Inspector Gadget, Egon Spengler in The Real Ghostbusters and Extreme Ghostbusters, The Brain in Animaniacs and Pinky and the Brain, various characters in Futurama)
- Campbell Lane
- Ruta Lee (Hidea Frankenstone in The Flintstone Comedy Show)
- Melanie Leishman (Brandy Silver in Detentionaire, Chipper in Grojband, Hannah Williams in Todd and the Book of Pure Evil: The End of the End, Emma in Total Drama Island (2023))
- Julie Lemieux (Funshine Bear in the Care Bears, Hunter Steele in Spider Riders, Louise in Max & Ruby, Rupert the Bear in Rupert, Sammy Tsukino in Sailor Moon Runo in Bakugan Battle Brawlers, Kelly and Josee in Total Drama Presents: The Ridonculous Race, Lil' Pal in Hamsters of Hamsterdale)
- Vanessa Lengies (Emily in Arthur, Kordi Freemaker in Lego Star Wars: The Freemaker Adventures)
- Andrea Libman (Emmy in Dragon Tales, Lemony in Yakkity Yak, Claude in Salty's Lighthouse, LaBrea in Dino Babies, Lemon Meringue in Strawberry Shortcake's Berry Bitty Adventures, and Pinkie Pie and Fluttershy in My Little Pony: Friendship is Magic)
- Jaclyn Linetsky (Caillou in Caillou (2000–2003), Meg in Mega Babies, Lori Mackney in What's with Andy? (season 2), Bitzi in Daft Planet, Kit in Kit and Kaboodle, Bertha in Rotten Ralph, Yukari in Tommy and Oscar, Ricardo and Yuko in Evolution Worlds, Shei-Hu in Sagwa, the Chinese Siamese Cat)
- Pauline Little (Carole Paddle in Kid Paddle, Lotus and Jasmine in The Little Flying Bears, Maya in Maya the Bee, Francine in Samurai Pizza Cats, Caillou's Grandma in Caillou)
- Jocelyne Loewen
- Donal Logue (Troy in Shark Bait and The Reef 2: High Tide)
- Quinn Lord (Jason in 3-2-1 Penguins!)
- Erica Luttrell (Keesha Franklin in The Magic School Bus, Princess Candy in Dave the Barbarian, Sapphire in Steven Universe, Erica Wang in The Epic Tales of Captain Underpants, Acxa in Voltron: Legendary Defender, Simone in As Told by Ginger)
- Les Lye

== M ==
- Norm MacDonald (Death in Family Guy, Norm the Genie in The Fairly OddParents, Lucky in the Dr. Dolittle films, Fang in Vampire Dog, Pigeon in Mike Tyson Mysteries, Glumshanks in Skylanders Academy)
- Norma MacMillan
- Jonathan Malen (Jimmy Z in Wild Kratts)
- Howie Mandel (Animal, Bunsen Honeydew, and Skeeter in Muppet Babies, Gizmo in Gremlins and Gremlins 2: The New Batch, Bobby in Bobby's World, and himself in Deal or No Deal and its video game)
- Michael Mando (Vaas Montenegro in Far Cry 3 and Far Cry 6)
- Larry D. Mann (Yukon Cornelius in Rudolph the Red-Nosed Reindeer)
- Alan Marriott
- Andrea Martin
- Madeleine Martin (JoJo Tickle in JoJo's Circus, Fionna in Adventure Time)
- Christian Martyn
- Walter Massey (King Conrad, Pondent, Walter, Paul, and Various Gnomes in The World of David the Gnome, Principal Herbert Haney in Arthur, Santa in Caillou's Holiday Movie, Ganimard in Night Hood)
- Anik Matern (Chloe in Madeline, Musa in seasons 3-4 of the Cinélume dub of Winx Club)
- Alison Matthews
- Erin Mathews
- Joseph May (Thomas the Tank Engine in Thomas & Friends and Thomas & Friends: The Adventure Begins)
- Bryn McAuley (Caillou in Caillou (1997–2000), Laney Penn in Grojband, Suzi in Camp Lakebottom, Quills in Numb Chucks, Amy and Samey in Total Drama: Pahkitew Island, Taylor in Total Drama Presents: The Ridonculous Race, Astra in Mermicorno: Starfall)
- Sean McCann (Grandfather Bear in Little Bear, Russell Copeland in George Shrinks)
- Scott McCord (Owen and Trent in Total Drama, McGee in Camp Lakebottom, Yang in Yin Yang Yo!, Dan Kuso in Bakugan)
- Eric McCormack (Lucky in Pound Puppies)
- Sarah McCullough (Musa in seasons 1-3 of the Cinelume dub of Winx Club)
- Miriam McDonald
- Kevin McDonald (Pleakley in the Lilo & Stitch franchise, Waffle in Catscratch, Almighty Tallest Purple in Invader Zim)
- Derek McGrath
- Terry McGurrin (the title character in Scaredy Squirrel, Jonesy Garcia in 6teen, Don in Total Drama Presents: The Ridonculous Race, Chris McLean in Total Drama Island (2023))
- Patrick McKenna (Prof. Pamplemoose in Sidekick, Nestor in Scaredy Squirrel, Dad in Atomic Betty, Norm Wendell in Crash Canyon)
- Britt McKillip (Cloe in Bratz, Lola Bunny in Baby Looney Tunes, Princess Cadance in My Little Pony: Friendship Is Magic)
- Carly McKillip (Sakura Avalon in Cardcaptors)
- Ed McNamara (Little John in Rocket Robin Hood)
- Scott McNeil (Multiple characters in series such as Beast Wars, Dragon Ball Z, Koga in InuYasha, Zorran and Zug in Salty's Lighthouse, Duo Maxwell in Mobile Suit Gundam Wing, Dr. Wily and Proto Man in Mega Man, Hohenheim of Light in Fullmetal Alchemist, Voltar in League of Super Evil, Ace the Bat-Hound and Ignatius in Krypto the Superdog)
- Dave McRae (Ian and Trickalien) starting in season 4 of Deer Squad, (Mr. Crumple) Luna, Chip and Inkie: Adventure Rangers go, (Helmet Hugo) Lana Longbeard, (various voices) in Super Wings, (various characters) in Doki (TV series), (Fire Chief Boyce and Gareth Griffiths) in the US version of Fireman Sam, The Brand voice of (Billy) from Barney's World, hundreds of radio and television commercials and promos.
- Thomas Middleditch (Penn Zero in Penn Zero: Part-Time Hero, Adam in Death Hacks, Terry in Solar Opposites)
- Melleny Melody
- Frank Meschkuleit (Toopy in Toopy and Binoo)
- Thomas Middleditch (Penn Zero in Penn Zero: Part-Time Hero, Adam in Death Hacks, Terry in Solar Opposites)
- Stephanie Anne Mills (Lindsay and Katie in Total Drama, Princess Fabia Sheen and Chan Lee in Bakugan, Vana Glama in Sidekick, Kirsten in 6teen)
- Tracey Moore (Princess Toadstool in The Adventures of Super Mario Bros. 3 and Super Mario World, the first voice of the titular character in Sailor Moon, Darla Gugenheek in The Adventures of Sam & Max: Freelance Police, the singing voice of Strawberry Shortcake in Strawberry Shortcake's Berry Bitty Adventures)
- Stephanie Morgenstern (Sailor Venus in Sailor Moon, Regina in Dino Crisis, Yin in Yin Yang Yo!)
- Rick Moranis
- Kirby Morrow (Third voice of Goku in Dragon Ball Z, Miroku in Inuyasha, Van Fanel in Escaflowne, Cyclops in X-Men: Evolution, Trowa Barton in Mobile Suit Gundam Wing, Cole in Ninjago, Jay in Class of the Titans)
- Jesse Moss (Billy in Billy the Cat, Enzo Matrix in ReBoot, Coal Trollwell in Trollz, Red in Firehouse Tales)
- Tegan Moss (Lisa / Kate in You, Me and the Kids, Penny in Gadget & the Gadgetinis)
- Al Mukadam (Johnny Abatti in Angela Anaconda, Nate in Oh No! It's an Alien Invasion)
- Colin Murdock (Junko in Storm Hawks, Vertex and Macro in RollBots, Red Menace in League of Super Evil, Maximus in Atomic Betty)
- Mike Myers (Shrek in the Shrek franchise)

== N ==
- Tony Nappo (Jimmy Falcone in Fugget About It)
- Robert Naylor (D.W. Read in Arthur (2007–2012))
- Drew Nelson (Jason in Girlstuff/Boystuff, Ben in Bakugan: Mechtanium Surge, Duncan in Total Drama, Kai in 6Teen
- Richard Newman
- Pauline Newstone
- Leslie Nielsen (Narrator in Katie and Orbie, Les Mutton / Zeroman in Zeroman)
- Eleanor Noble (George in Arthur, Icy in the Cinélume dub of Winx Club, Periwinkle Bellflower in The Bellflower Bunnies)
- John Novak
- Joanna Noyes (Grandma Thora Read in Arthur, Auntie Noah in Wunschpunsch)

== O ==
- Brenna O'Brien (Rin in Inuyasha)
- Catherine O'Hara (Sally in The Nightmare Before Christmas, Jackie Martin in Glenn Martin, DDS, Miss Malone in The Completely Mental Misadventures of Ed Grimley, Kaossandra in Skylanders Academy, Liz Larsen in Committed)
- Maggie Blue O'Hara (Kitty Pryde in X-Men: Evolution, Bulma in Dragon Ball Z, Ultra Violet in Ninjago)
- Annick Obonsawin (Sierra in Total Drama, Inez in Cyberchase, Skunk in Franklin, Maxine in Mischief City, Gwen in Mermicorno: Starfall)
- Steven Ogg (Trevor Philips in Grand Theft Auto V and Grand Theft Auto Online, Professor Venomous and Laserblast in OK K.O.! Let's Be Heroes)
- Sandra Oh (Sun Park in American Dragon Jake Long, Marsha Mitsubishi in The Proud Family, Hiko Yoshida in American Dad!, Castaspella in She-Ra and the Princesses of Power, Debbie Grayson in Invincible)
- Enuka Okuma (Lady Une in Mobile Suit Gundam Wing, Jade in War Planets, Android 18 in Dragon Ball Z, Rhodonite in Steven Universe)
- Peter Oldring (Ezekiel, Tyler and Cody in Total Drama, Rabbit in My Friend Rabbit, Conor Martin in Glenn Martin, DDS)
- Denise Oliver (Kitty Ko in Sidekick, Liz Fuentes in Rosie's Rules, Mina Beff in Grojband, Maurecia in Wayside, Hazel the Squirrel in My Friend Rabbit, Iris in Spy Academy, Gwyn in Looped, Nell in Oh Noah!)
- Nicole Oliver (Princess Celestia and Cheerilee in My Little Pony: Friendship Is Magic, Zoe Trent in Littlest Pet Shop)
- Ty Olsson (Ord in Dragon Tales, Troll in Packages from Planet X, Hunk in Voltron Force)
- Johnny Orlando
- Corinne Orr
- David Orth

== P ==
- Giles Panton (Keith in Voltron Force, Tarzan and Jane, Clay Moorington in Lego Nexo Knights, Hitotsubashi Nobunobu in Gin Tama, Ven Ghan in Max Steel, Lucas Remy in Kong: King of the Apes)
- Ron Pardo (Zerby Derby, Almost Naked Animals, The Cat in the Hat Knows a Lot About That, Numb Chucks, Zack & Deuce, Grojband, Camp Lakebottom, Fugget About It, Redakai, Sons of Butcher, Crash Canyon, Bob and Margaret, Turbo Dogs, What It's Like Being Alone, Busytown Mysteries, Medabots, Dumb Bunnies, Quads, The Ripping Friends, Atomic Betty, Moville Mysteries, Beyblade, The Berenstain Bears, Cyberchase, Ace Ventura: Pet Detective, Rescue Heroes, Gerald McBoing Boing, Storm Hawks, Jacob Two-Two, Di-Gata Defenders, Pippi Longstocking, Funpak, Peep and the Big Wide World, Totally Spies, My Dad the Rock Star, Captain Flamingo, Committed, Coolman, Carl Squared, Children of Chelm, Braceface and Subconscious Password)
- Doug Parker (Terrorsaur and Starscream in Beast Wars: Transformers, Mega Man in Captain N: The Game Master, also serves as a voice director)
- Miklos Perlus (Eric Needles in Sidekick)
- Jane Perry
- Ward Perry (Dr. Wheelo in Dragon Ball Z, Rowen of the Strata in Ronin Warriors, Geese Howard in Fatal Fury)
- Mike Petersen (Fergus Fraggle in Fraggle Rock)
- Eric Peterson (Rainbow King in True and the Rainbow Kingdom)
- Adrian Petriw (Tony Stark / Iron Man in Iron Man: Armored Adventures, Commander Gren in The Dragon Prince, Adam in The Hollow)
- Dan Petronijevic (Geoff in Total Drama, Adam Spitz in Braceface, Narrator in Beyblade)
- Ross Petty
- Andrew Pifko
- Cara Pifko (Josephine Praline in Angela Anaconda, Yeoman Kelly Chambers in Mass Effect 2 and 3)
- Alison Pill (Cornflower in Redwall, Paulette in Anatole)
- Jacqueline Pillon (Rintaro in Medabots, Matt in Cyberchase, Cookie Falcone in Fugget About It)
- Erin Pitt (Evie in Mike the Knight)
- David Anthony Pizzuto
- Christopher Plummer (Henri in An American Tail, the Narrator in The World of David the Gnome, Metamorphis in Light Years, The Narrator in Madeline, Grand Duke in Rock-A-Doodle, Charles F. Muntz in Up, and 1 in 9)
- Christian Potenza (Chris McLean in Total Drama, Trevor Troublemeyer in Sidekick, Jude Lizowski in 6teen)
- Chris Potter (Gambit/Remy LeBeau in X-Men: The Animated Series)
- Connor Price (B.B. Jammies in The Save-Ums!)
- Jason Priestley (Jack McCyber in Biker Mice from Mars, Chameleon Boy in Superman: The Animated Series)
- Toby Proctor (Tuxedo Mask in the DiC dub of Sailor Moon)

== R ==
- Barbara Radecki (Sailor Neptune in Sailor Moon S)
- Anand Rajaram (VJ Mendhi in The Dating Guy, Nalappat in Crash Canyon)
- James Rankin (Cheatsy Koopa in The Adventures of Super Mario Bros. 3 and Super Mario World, Mr. Owl in Franklin, Buttons in Puppets Who Kill, Eco in Groundling Marsh)
- Jeremy Ratchford (Smoke in Mortal Kombat: Defenders of the Realm)
- David Reale (Kai Hiwatari in Beyblade, Tsubasa Otori in Beyblade: Metal Fusion)
- Dean Redman
- Keanu Reeves (Duke Caboom in Toy Story 4, Theodore "Ted" Logan in Bill & Ted's Excellent Adventures)
- Dan Redican
- Adam Reid (Loopy in King, Wayne in 6Teen, Tommy Turkey in Birdz, Justin in Total Drama, Zitzy in Urban Vermin)
- Noah Reid (Franklin in Franklin, Tommy Settergren in Pippi Longstocking, Gunther in Jane and the Dragon, Eddie in Marvin the Tap-Dancing Horse)
- Justin Reinsilber (Brian Meech in Grand Theft Auto IV)
- Mark Rendall (Arthur Read in Arthur, Todd in Wayside, Noodle in The Save-Ums!, Jester in Jane and the Dragon)
- Jodie Resther (Francine Frensky in Arthur, Tecna in Winx Club)
- Ryan Reynolds (Ty Cheese in Zeroman)
- Caroline Rhea (Linda Flynn-Fletcher in Phineas and Ferb)
- Shane Rimmer (Scott Tracy in Thunderbirds)
- Martin Roach (Jake Justice in Rescue Heroes, Dr. Claw in Inspector Gadget, Grandpa Gravel in Rubble & Crew, Master Yo in Yin Yang Yo!)
- Scott Roberts
- Gord Robertson (Zomboomafoo in Zoboomafoo, Galileo in Groundling Marsh, Rumple Fraggle in Fraggle Rock, Bill in Puppets Who Kill)
- Jennifer Robertson (Tricia in 6teen)
- Seth Rogen
- Rino Romano (Randy Hernandez in Godzilla: The Series, Batman in The Batman, Spider-Man in Spider-Man Unlimited, Eduardo Rivera in Extreme Ghostbusters, Lone Starr in Spaceballs: The Animated Series, Luis Sera in Resident Evil 4, Scorp in the Skylanders franchise and Tuxedo Mask in Sailor Moon)
- Tony Rosato (Luigi in Super Mario World and The Adventures of Super Mario Bros. 3, Quentin Eggert in Pelswick)
- Ron Rubin (Raticus in Flying Rhino Junior High, Artemis in Sailor Moon, Vision in The Avengers: United They Stand, Morph in X-Men: The Animated Series)
- Elysia Rotaru
- Tracy Ryan

== S ==
- Andrew Sabiston (Squirt in Mike the Knight, Yoshi in Super Mario World)
- Daniel Samonas (Teo in Avatar: The Last Airbender)
- Will Sasso (Balthazor Hellman in Neighbors from Hell, Tommy Margaretti in Murder Police, Strong "The Sledgehammer" Ishijima in Yu-Gi-Oh! Arc-V)
- Tyrone Savage (Matthias in Redwall, Lightning in Total Drama)
- Devon Sawa (Flash Thompson in Spider-Man: The New Animated Series)
- Terrence Scammell
- Paul Schoeffler (Katz, Dr. Vindaloo, The Clutching Foot, The Cajun Fox, The Snowman, The Goose God, Le Quack, and Dr. Žalost in Courage the Cowardly Dog)
- Pablo Schreiber (The Asylum Staff in Manhunt 2)
- Jennifer Seguin (Doris in Caillou, Mom in Rotten Ralph, Stella in the Cinélume dub of Winx Club, Millicent Crosswire in Arthur)
- Paul Shaffer (Hermes in the Hercules franchise, Flash Gordon)
- Kerry Shale (Gnasher in Dennis and Gnasher, starred in the video games Deponia Just Cause 2, Driver: San Francisco, Blood Stone, Tomb Raider: The Last Revelation, Tomb Raider: Chronicles, Dog's Life, Original War, Big Mutha Truckers, Killzone, Fable, Space Channel 5: Part 2, Blade II, Vietcong, Vietcong 2, Vietcong: Fist Alpha, Sherlock Holmes: Crimes & Punishments, Urban Chaos, The Movies, Imperium Galactica II: Alliances, The Witcher, Battalion Wars and Broken Sword 5: The Serpent's Curse)
- Kelly Sheridan (Barbie in the Barbie franchise, Starlight Glimmer in My Little Pony: Friendship Is Magic, Mammoth Mutt in Krypto the Superdog, Sango in Inuyasha, Melody in My Little Pony Tales, Hitomi Kanzaki in Escaflowne, Queenie in Billy the Cat, Mystique Sonia and Rosefinch in Hero: 108, Nana Komatsu in Nana)
- Chuck Shamata (Cheech in Fugget About It)
- William Shatner (James T. Kirk in the Star Trek franchise, Mayor Phlegmming in Osmosis Jones, Ozzie in Over the Hedge, Jason of the Argonauts in an episode of Disney's Hercules)
- Martin Short (Stubbs the Clown in We're Back! A Dinosaur's Story, Hubie in The Pebble and the Penguin, Huy in The Prince of Egypt, Ed Grimley and Emil Gustav in The Completely Mental Misadventures of Ed Grimley, Ooblar in Jimmy Neutron: Boy Genius, Lars in 101 Dalmatians II: Patch's London Adventure, B.E.N. in Treasure Planet, Preminger in Barbie as the Princess and the Pauper, Thimbletack in The Spiderwick Chronicles, the Woodsman in Hoodwinked 2: Hood vs. Evil, and The Cat in the Hat in The Cat in the Hat Knows a Lot About That!)
- Cedric Smith (Professor X in X-Men: The Animated Series, Tiberius in Friends and Heroes)
- Lyon Smith (Corey Riffin in Grojband, Rally in The Adventures of Chuck and Friends)
- Robert Smith
- Ruby Smith-Merovitz (Nanette Manoir in Angela Anaconda)
- David Sobolov (Drax the Destroyer in Guardians of the Galaxy, Upgrade and Vin Ethanol in Ben 10, Shockwave in Transformers: Prime, Gorilla Grodd in Justice League Action)
- Paul Soles (Hermey in Rudolph the Red-Nosed Reindeer, Spider-Man in Spider-Man, various characters in The Marvel Super Heroes)
- Norm Spencer (Cyclops in X-Men: The Animated Series and Marvel vs. Capcom)
- Shoshana Sperling (Mrs. Melba in Ella the Elephant)
- Tabitha St. Germain (a.k.a. Paulina Gillis) (Milo Powell/Captain Flamingo in Captain Flamingo, Tinny in RollBots, Alpha Girl Latifah in Hero 108, Rarity in My Little Pony: Friendship is Magic, Kootie Pie Koopa in The Adventures of Super Mario Bros. 3 and Super Mario World, Ginger and other characters in Beetlejuice, Augie Shumway and Rhoda in ALF: The Animated Series, AlfTales, Kitty in Dog City, Asha in Star Wars: Ewoks, Ashley Evergreen in Sylvanian Families)
- Harry Standjofski (Lian-Chu in Dragon Hunters)
- Nicole Stamp (Sanders in Total Drama Presents: The Ridonculous Race, Betty in Rusty Rivets, Ingrit in Fangbone!)
- John Stocker (Manfred and Newton Gimmick in The Adventures of Teddy Ruxpin, Ultron in The Avengers: United They Stand, Basil in Babar, Bartholomew Batt and Mr. Monitor in Beetlejuice, Max's Dad in Beyblade, Father Cat, Humperdink, and Wolfgang Wolf in The Busy World of Richard Scarry, Longarm / P.J. O'Malley in C.O.P.S., Beastly in The Care Bears, Bugsy Vile in Dog City, Kutlass in Donkey Kong Country, Widdle Warrick in Ewoks, Federico Froggina in Jojo's Circus, Rocky in Miss Spider's Sunny Patch Friends, Brother Alf and Cheesethief in Redwall, Asle in Stroker and Hoop, Toad in The Super Mario Bros. Super Show! and The Adventures of Super Mario Bros. 3, Oogtar in Super Mario World, Melvin and Various Monster Hunters in Tales from the Cryptkeeper, Brawny Accomplice and Kai's Uncle in Time Warp Trio, Bedhead in Totally Spies!, Mayor Rosenbaum in Mona the Vampire, Detective Thompson in The Adventures of Tintin, Graydon Creed and Leech in X-Men: The Animated Series)
- Doug Stone
- Marc Strange (Lord Glenn in Silver Surfer, Forge in X-Men: The Animated Series)
- Sarah Strange (Ranma Saotome in Ranma ½, Franklin in Dinobabies, Rookie in Littlest Pet Shop)
- Tara Strong (Dil Pickles in Rugrats and All Grown Up!, Timmy Turner and Poof in The Fairly OddParents, Bubbles in The Powerpuff Girls, Rikku in Final Fantasy X/X-2, Ben Tennyson in Ben 10, Twilight Sparkle in My Little Pony: Friendship is Magic, Princess Unikitty in Unikitty!, Batgirl and Harley Quinn in various media, Mondo in Hamsters of Hamsterdale)
- Bob Stutt
- Cree Summer (Penny in Inspector Gadget (Season 1), Elmyra Duff in Tiny Toon Adventures and Pinky, Elmyra & the Brain, Max Gibson in Batman Beyond, Susie Carmichael in Rugrats and All Grown Up!, Princess Kida in Atlantis: The Lost Empire, Valerie Gray in Danny Phantom, Foxxy Love in Drawn Together, Numbuh 5 and Cree in Codename: Kids Next Door, Magma in X-Men Legends, Yvonne and Gordon in Mrs. Munger's Class, Cleo in Clifford the Big Red Dog)
- Brad Swaile (Light Yagami in Death Note, Gohan in Dragon Ball Z, Nightcrawler in X-Men: Evolution)
- Kiefer Sutherland
- Jason Szwimmer (D.W. Read from Arthur (2002–2006))

== T ==
- Aron Tager
- Emma Taylor-Isherwood (Mona in Mona the Vampire, Miffy in Miffy, Camille Wallaby in The Mysteries of Alfred Hedgehog)
- Sally Taylor-Isherwood (Alice in Upstairs, Downstairs Bears, Clementine and Melanie in Caillou, Tory in Just Jamie)
- Emily Tennant (Polly Pocket in Polly Pocket)
- Jeff Teravainen
- Dave Thomas
- Reece Thompson
- Brigid Tierney (Jenna Morgan in Arthur, Sarah in Rotten Ralph)
- Jacob Tierney
- Jennifer Tilly (Bonnie Swanson in Family Guy, Celia in Monsters, Inc., Grace in Home on the Range, The Sorceress in Randy Cunningham: 9th Grade Ninja)
- Robert Tinkler (Howie in Almost Naked Animals, Arnold in Totally Spies, Shakes in Oh No! It's an Alien Invasion, Delete in Cyberchase)
- Brent Titcomb
- Lee Tockar (Bling-Bling Boy in Johnny Test, Abyo and Tobe in Pucca, Doktor Frogg in League of Super Evil)
- Vincent Tong (Kai in Ninjago)
- Elias Toufexis
- Kira Tozer (Minka Mark in Littlest Pet Shop, Kagome Higurashi in Inuyasha: The Final Act)
- Alex Trebek (appeared as himself in The Simpsons, Family Guy, Arthur, Alan Quebec in Rugrats)
- Jacob Tremblay (Pete the Cat in Pete the Cat)

== V ==
- Joanne Vannicola (One in Seven Little Monsters, Claude in Timothy Goes to School, Koji Karakuchi in Medabots, Johnny McGregor and Doctor K in Beyblade, Willy Zilla in My Dad the Rock Star, Kajetan in Wunderkind Little Amadeus, Maurcho in Bakugan Battle Brawlers, Huckle in Busytown Mysteries, Woofster in Super Why!, Toot in Toot & Puddle, Biggs in The Adventures of Chuck and Friends, Jake in Crash Canyon)
- John Vernon
- Sam Vincent (Edd in Ed, Edd n Eddy, Athrun Zala in Gundam Seed and Gundam Seed Destiny, Jordan in Oban Star Racers, Aerrow and Dark Ace in Storm Hawks, Krypto in Krypto the Superdog, Julian Star in Cardcaptors, Baby Bugs, Baby Daffy and Baby Tweety in Baby Looney Tunes, Marshall in Dino Babies, Stegz in Extreme Dinosaurs, Hare in Monster Rancher, Forge in X-Men: Evolution, Spin in RollBots and Lloyd Garmadon in Ninjago)
- Martin Villafana (Myron in Wayside)

== W ==
- Jamie Watson (Henry in Timothy Goes to School, Taury in Harry and His Bucket Full of Dinosaurs, Ron the Rent-A-Cop in 6teen, Quack in Peep and the Big Wide World, Massimo in Producing Parker, King Friday XIII in Daniel Tiger's Neighborhood)
- Jeffrey Watson
- Richard Waugh (Albert Wesker in Resident Evil: Code Veronica and 4)
- Samantha Weinstein (Janine in Gerald McBoing Boing, Swan Maiden in Super Why!, Chiku in Babar and the Adventures of Badou, Mindy Gelato in The ZhuZhus, Finnuala in Wishfart, Gina and Harmony in Let's Go Luna!, Sloane in D.N. Ace, Clara Tinhorn in Dino Ranch, Akira and Saya in FLCL: Grunge)
- Danny Wells
- Cathy Weseluck (Near in Death Note, Cybersix in Cybersix, Spike in My Little Pony: Friendship is Magic)
- Ron White (Ace Hart in Dog City)
- Trevor White
- Chris Wiggins
- Peter Wildman
- Harland Williams
- Kirsten Williamson (Ororo Munroe / Storm in X-Men: Evolution)
- Dale Wilson (Ja-Kal in Mummies Alive!, Paw Pooch in Krypto the Superdog)
- Jonathan Wilson (Chudd Chudders in Skatoony, Rosebud in Camp Lakebottom, Steggy in Harry and His Bucket Full of Dinosaurs, Coop in Yin Yang Yo!)
- Rachel Wilson (Heather in Total Drama)
- Michael Wincott
- Maurice Dean Wint
- James A. Woods
- Marc Worden (Slam in The Zeta Project, Trap Shadow in Skylanders)
- Janet Wright (Constance in Redwall)

== Y ==
- Lisa Yamanaka (Wanda Li in The Magic School Bus, Yoko in Timothy Goes to School)
- Jack J. Yang (Chau Wu in Need for Speed: Undercover)
- Michael Yarmush (original voice of Arthur Read in Arthur (1996–2000), Timmy in the Cinélume dub of Winx Club, E. Brian in Pig City)
- Richard Yearwood (Kenny Rides in Rescue Heroes, Budge Bentley in Growing Up Creepie, Paul in Dinosaucers, Donkey Kong in Donkey Kong Country)

== Z ==
- Alex Zahara (Shinsuke Takasugi in Gin Tama, Lockon Stratos in Mobile Suit Gundam 00, Mr. Mizuki in NANA)
- Lenore Zann (Rogue in X-Men: The Animated Series, Aisha Clanclan in Outlaw Star, Wendy Waters in Rescue Heroes)
- Chiara Zanni (Hahil in Bionicle: Mask of Light, Hamtaro in Hamtaro and Stellaluna, Jubilee in X-Men: Evolution, Bon Bon in My Little Pony Tales, Nori, the Mermaid in Barbie: Mermaidia, Hakudoshi in Inuyasha, Eva/Molly in Oban Star Racers, Miriam "Mimi" Mortin in What about Mimi?)
- Matt Zimmerman
- Noam Zylberman
