= House of Cool =

Canadian animation studio

House of Cool Studios
- Type: Subsidiary
- Industry: Animation
- Predecessor: Red Rover Studios
- Founded: 1994; 32 years ago
- Founder: Ricardo Curtis; Wes Lui
- Headquarters: Toronto, Ontario, Canada
- Key people: Ricardo Curtis (president); Wes Lui (CEO)
- Services: Animation production; Storyboard; Design
- Parent: WildBrain (2023–present)
- Website: www.houseofcool.com

House of Cool Studios is a boutique animation studio based in Toronto, Ontario, Canada and founded as a pre-production studio in 1994 by animation veteran Ricardo Curtis and finance expert Wes Lui, specializing in designing and storyboarding of films, series and commercials.

On March 29, 2023, Canadian media company WildBrain announced its intent to acquire the company for CA$18.3 million. The acquisition was completed on July 19, 2023.

== Red Rover Studios ==
Red Rover Studios was founded in London by Andy and Linzi Knight in 1994. It was a full production studio that focused on 2D and CGI animation. They later moved to Toronto, Ontario, Canada. However, in July 2008, Red Rover was acquired by House of Cool after Andy Knight died, three months earlier.

== Filmography ==
=== As Red Rover Studios ===
- All Dogs Go to Heaven 2 (1996) (film)
- Broken Sword: Circle of Blood (1996) (video game)
- Broken Sword: The Shadow of the Templars (1996) (video game)
- Beauty and the Beast: The Enchanted Christmas (1997) (film)
- Ned's Newt (1997) (TV series)
- 1001 Nights (1998) (film)
- Bob and Margaret (1999) (TV series)
- Joseph: King of Dreams (2000) (film)
- Snickers (2000)
- The Ripping Friends (2001) (TV series)
- Hey Arnold!: The Jungle Movie (2001) (film, test footage)
- Pig City (2002) (TV series)
- Get Ed (2005) (TV series)
- Reefer Madness: The Musical (2005) (film) ("The Brownie Song" sequence)
- Gnomeo and Juliet (2011) (film)

=== As House of Cool ===
- Horton Hears a Who! (2008) (film)
- Ollie & the Baked Halibut (2009) (short)
- Ice Age: Dawn of the Dinosaurs (2009) (film)
- 9 (2009) (film)
- Ninjamaica (2009) (series)
- Despicable Me (2010) (film)
- Jonah Hex (2010) (film)
- The LeBrons (2011) (series) (Season 1)
- Rio (2011) (film)
- Hugo (2011) (film)
- Ice Age: A Mammoth Christmas (2011) (short)
- Ice Age: Continental Drift (2012) (film)
- Gravity Falls (2012) (TV series, early development)
- Escape from Planet Earth (2013) (film)
- Epic (2013) (film)
- Free Birds (2013) (film)
- Rio 2 (2014) (film)
- The Book of Life (2014) (film)
- DreamWorks Dragons (2015) (TV series)
- The Peanuts Movie (2015) (film)
- Ice Age: The Great Egg-Scapade (2016) (short)
- Nova Seed (2016) (film)
- The Angry Birds Movie (2016) (film)
- Ice Age: Collision Course (2016) (film)
- TMNT Summer Shorts "Pizza Friday" (2016) (short)
- Trollhunters (2016) (series)
- Ferdinand (2017) (film)
- Next Gen (2018) (film)
- 3Below: Tales of Arcadia (2018) (series)
- The Angry Birds Movie 2 (2019) (film)
- Spies in Disguise (2019) (film)
- He-Man and the Masters of the Universe (2021) (series)
- Pretzel and the Puppies (2022) (series)
- Untitled CG-animated Peanuts film (TBA)
