= Andy Knight =

Canadian film director

- Born: Andrew James Knight; November 23, 1961; Pembroke, Ontario, Canada
- Died: April 11, 2008 (aged 46); Paris, France
- Years active: 1990–2008

Andrew James Knight (November 23, 1961 – April 11, 2008) was a Canadian animator, film and television director, voice actor, and creator of Ned's Newt, Pig City and Get Ed.

== Life and career ==
Andy Knight was born in Pembroke, Ontario, the son of Geoffrey and Betty Knight, and has two older siblings, Fiona Knight-Gagné and Peter Knight.

Knight's entry into the animation industry was with Gaumont in Paris. During his time in France he worked on a number of film and television projects, including the Inspector Gadget series. In 1989, he moved to London, as Creative Director of the Passion Pictures studio. In 1992, he and his wife, Linzi, struck out on their own, founding Red Rover Studios in the UK. In 1996, they were persuaded to open the Disney Canada studio in Toronto, to which they agreed on condition that The Walt Disney Company finance the move of Red Rover to Toronto, as well.

Over the years, among a large amount of work, he contributed to three Asterix films as a storyboard artist and supervisor, was animation director for DreamWorks' 2D-animated production Joseph: King of Dreams (2000), directed the Disney animated holiday film Beauty and the Beast: The Enchanted Christmas, and was the writer/director of the BAFTA- and Annie Award-nominated 2003 short Plumber. In addition, he created, developed, wrote, animated and directed many award-winning commercial and television projects, including the animated series Ned's Newt (Nelvana), Pig City (CinéGroupe), and Get Ed (Jetix).

== Death ==
Knight died of a stroke on April 11, 2008.

According to the Canadian Film Centre, his wife and partner, Linzi, who was a 2010 alumnus of its film director program, has also passed away.
