= List of Justin Time episodes =

This is a list of episodes from the Family Jr. television series Justin Time. Initially stories aired as individual quarter-hour segments, but were also paired up together to compose half-hour episodes.

== Series overview ==
| Season | Segments | Episodes | Originally released | |
| Season | Segments | Episodes | First released | Last released |
|---|---|---|---|---|
| 1 | 26 | 13 | September 23, 2011 | December 28, 2012 |
| 2 | 26 | 13 | September 6, 2013 | January 17, 2014 |
| 3 (GO!) | 24 | 13 | June 20, 2016 (Netflix) | November 25, 2016 |

== Episodes ==
=== Season 1 (2011-2012) ===
| No. overall | No. in season | Title | Setting | Original release date |
|---|---|---|---|---|
| 1 | 1 | "The Missing Mask" | Ancient Mexico (15th Century) | September 23, 2011 |
Justin and Squidgy help Olive find her missing Sun Mask.
| 2 | 2 | "The Very Large Book of Pets" | India (17th Century) | September 26, 2011 |
Justin gets a pet elephant and realizes that taking care of a pet is a lot of work.
| 3 | 3 | "Yodel Odel Day" | Switzerland (1800s) | September 28, 2011 |
Justin and Squidgy help Olive deliver a very special gift to her Grandpa.
| 4 | 4 | "Wait, Little Penguin!" | Antarctica | October 5, 2011 |
Justin, Squidgy, and Olive help a baby penguin find his way home.
| 5 | 5 | "It's a Viking Thing" | Greenland (10th Century) | October 6, 2011 |
Justin helps a crew of Vikings discover the world around them.
| 6 | 6 | "Follow Those Chickens" | Australia (1800s) | October 10, 2011 |
Justin, Olive, and Squidgy go on a "walkabout" as they look for Olive's wayward chickens.
| 7 | 7 | "The Rubbery Dumplings" | Ancient China (8th Century BC) | October 14, 2011 |
Justin, Olive, and Squidgy show a troupe of boisterous barbarians why good manners are so important.
| 8 | 8 | "Hootenanny Hoedown" | America (1800s) | October 17, 2011 |
Justin goes on a wagon adventure across the Old West and realizes that his big wagon isn't necessarily the best wagon.
| 9 | 9 | "You Forgot to Say 'Arrgh'" | Antigua and Barbuda (1700s) | October 19, 2011 |
Justin goes on a pirate adventure and learns that appearances can be deceptive.
| 10 | 10 | "The Sultan's Wish" | Saudi Arabia (Early 1800s) | October 20, 2011 |
Justin wishes everyday could be his birthday but realizes that it's only special because it happens once a year.
| 11 | 11 | "Roman Racers" | Italy | October 25, 2011 |
Justin learns the importance of taking care of his bicycle when he races his chariot in ancient Rome.
| 12 | 12 | "Show and Tell" | Ecuador (Early 1900s) | October 26, 2011 |
Justin sets out to collect animals for the zoo, but learns that animals are better off in their own homes.
| 13 | 13 | "Secret Surprise" | Ancient Japan (1700s) | October 28, 2011 |
Justin and Squidgy use their ninja skills to help Olive prepare a surprise birthday party for the Emperor.
| 14 | 14 | "A Mammoth Mistake" | Russia (30,000 BC) | November 4, 2011 |
Monty the mammoth runs away after causing an accident, and Justin, Olive, and Squidgy must bring him back home.
| 15 | 15 | "Marcello's Meatballs" | Italy (1550) | November 7, 2011 |
Justin and Squidgy help Olive prepare a meal fit for a royally picky eater.
| 16 | 16 | "Where's the Oasis?" | Egypt (1400s) | November 9, 2011 |
Justin and Squidgy transport Olive on their camel train and learn why it's important to ask for help.
| 17 | 17 | "Big Sub Hubbub" | Bahamas (1900s) | November 10, 2011 |
Justin and Squidgy pilot a submarine to help harbor master Olive find her missing octopus friend.
| 18 | 18 | "The Great Wall" | China (100 AD) | January 20, 2012 |
Justin, Olive, and Squidgy make a new friend who lives on the other side of the wall.
| 19 | 19 | "Giddy Up, Wrong Way!" | America (1920s) | January 23, 2012 |
Justin becomes a jockey and learns that winning isn't everything.
| 20 | 20 | "Wiki Wiki Wipeout!" | Hawaii (1800s) | February 20, 2012 |
Justin, Olive, and Squidgy set off to a nearby island to collect orchids, but after their boat goes missing, they must find another way home.
| 21 | 21 | "The Pancake Express" | Canada (1910s) | February 23, 2012 |
Justin and Squidgy invite Olive aboard their steam train to help deliver her maple syrup to Flapjack Falls.
| 22 | 22 | "The Big Stone Circle" | England (2490 BC) | June 4, 2012 |
Olive is slowly constructing a stone structure to be used for stargazing when Justin suggests a faster way to do it.
| 23 | 23 | "Brave Sir Justin" | England (1800s) | June 25, 2012 |
Justin becomes a knight and overcomes his fear of the dark.
| 24 | 24 | "Cleopatra's Cat" | Ancient Egypt (30 BC) | October 15, 2012 |
When Queen Cleopatra's cat runs away from Olive's tent, Justin, Olive, and Squidgy search through the pyramids to find her.
| 25 | 25 | "Blast Off!" | America (1969) | October 18, 2012 |
Justin and Squidgy follow instructions from Olive at mission control to rescue an astronaut.
| 26 | 26 | "Up, Up, and Away!" | France (1889) | December 28, 2012 |
Justin, Olive, and Squidgy work as a team to rescue the Mayor of Paris when he accidentally floats away in Olive's hot air balloon.

=== Season 2 (2013-2014) ===
| No. overall | No. in season | Title | Setting | Original release date |
|---|---|---|---|---|
| 27 | 1 | "Tower of Justin" | America (1930s) | September 6, 2013 |
Justin learns how to build the tallest skyscraper ever.
| 28 | 2 | "The Thirsty Garden" | Iraq (601 BC) | September 9, 2013 |
Justin saves Olive's dried up garden by tracking down the source of the problem.
| 29 | 3 | "Mystery of the Missing Hat" | England (Early 1900s) | September 12, 2013 |
Detectives Justin and Squidgy help Olive find her missing hat.
| 30 | 4 | "Go, Team, Go!" | Guatemala (800 BC) | September 17, 2013 |
Justin learns how to be a team player in an ancient Guatemalan ballgame.
| 31 | 5 | "Monkey Shadows" | Indonesia (1600s) | September 20, 2013 |
Justin, Olive, and Squidgy put on a puppet show for some monkeys using only their shadows.
| 32 | 6 | "The Golden Yarn" | Greece (500 BC) | September 23, 2013 |
Justin, Olive, and Squidgy embark on a heroic quest in search of The Golden Yarn.
| 33 | 7 | "Jumbo Loves Gumbo" | America (1930s) | September 25, 2013 |
Justin, Olive, and Squidgy explore the bayou of Louisiana to invite a group of fireflies to the best Fais do-do in Louisiana.
| 34 | 8 | "Too Many Cupcakes!" | France (Late 1800s) | September 26, 2013 |
Justin, Olive, and Squidgy work together to decorate a huge order of cupcakes at a patisserie.
| 35 | 9 | "Dino Putt" | America (66 Million BC) | October 7, 2013 |
Justin learns how to choose the right game to play so that Rexy, Olive's huge friendly pet dinosaur, can join in too.
| 36 | 10 | "The Northwest Shortcut" | Canada (1850) | October 8, 2013 |
Justin, Olive, and Squidgy make an important delivery across the Northwest Passage thanks to a helpful narwhal.
| 37 | 11 | "Yukon Dawn" | Canada (Late 1800s) | October 10, 2013 |
Justin, Olive, and Squidgy go on a wild mine cart ride to help their neighbour find her lost dog.
| 38 | 12 | "The Lion Dance" | China (Late 1800s) | October 15, 2013 |
Justin, Olive, and Squidgy learn how to be the best lion dancers for the Chinese New Year celebrations.
| 39 | 13 | "Pit Crew Hullabaloo" | England (1920) | October 17, 2013 |
Racecar driver Justin learns that he needs a trusty pit crew in order to win the race.
| 40 | 14 | "The Sharing Box" | Canada (Early 1700s) | October 21, 2013 |
Justin, Olive, and Squidgy help some troubled animals and learn the pleasure of sharing with others.
| 41 | 15 | "A Tree House Tale" | Papua New Guinea (1961) | October 24, 2013 |
Justin learns that a private tree house can be shared with friends.
| 42 | 16 | "To The Rescue!" | America (Early 1930s) | October 25, 2013 |
Firefighter Justin learns that he can be a hero by helping out in many little ways.
| 43 | 17 | "The Big Toot" | England (1100s) | November 11, 2013 |
Justin, Olive, and Squidgy work together with their tugboats to rescue a precious passenger aboard a steamliner.
| 44 | 18 | "Made in the Trade" | India (2000 BC) | November 15, 2013 |
Justin explores a bustling market and learns the value of a good trade from some colorful merchants.
| 45 | 19 | "Jungle Jam" | Kenya (Early 1930s) | November 25, 2013 |
Justin, Olive, and Squidgy hop aboard different vehicles for an adventurous search-and-rescue mission.
| 46 | 20 | "Circus Spectacular" | Russia (Late 1900s) | November 28, 2013 |
Justin, Olive, and Squidgy overcome their mistakes to become circus stars.
| 47 | 21 | "Olé Olé!" | Spain (1500s) | December 10, 2013 |
Justin learns the importance of keeping his promises on his way to performing the Flamenco for the King.
| 48 | 22 | "Go Get Gretel" | Germany (1940s) | December 12, 2013 |
Justin leads Olive and Squidgy up Germany's tallest mountain to rescue Gretel, a wayward goat.
| 49 | 23 | "Finding Fifi" | France (1300s) | December 17, 2013 |
Musketeers Justin, Olive, and Squidgy set off on a rescue mission to save Princess Fifi.
| 50 | 24 | "Voyage of the Voyageurs" | Canada (1680) | December 19, 2013 |
Justin, Olive, and Squidgy set off on a canoe adventure to make an important delivery across the wilderness.
| 51 | 25 | "Atuk's Inukshuk" | Alaska (1930s) | January 13, 2014 |
Justin, Olive, and Squidgy set off on a dog sledding adventure and learn the importance of taking breaks.
| 52 | 26 | "Tulip Trouble" | Netherlands (1900s) | January 17, 2014 |
Justin, Olive, and Squidgy sacrifice their entry in the Tulip Festival by stopping to save their neighbor's flooded field.(This was originally intended to be the series finale, but the show was renewed for one more season)

=== Season 3 (Justin Time Go!) (2016) ===
| No. overall | No. in season | Title | Setting | Original release date |
|---|---|---|---|---|
| 53 | 1 | "Sammy The Kid" | America (1860s) | June 20, 2016 |
Justin meets his new neighbor, Samuel ("Sammy"), who plays "Sammy the Kid" in this Wild West adventure.
| 54 | 2 | "Moon Jump" | America (1960s) | June 20, 2016 |
Justin and Squidgy have to help astronaut Olive find her missing space dog.
| 55 | 3 | "Super Speed Jet" | America (1950s) | June 21, 2016 |
Justin, Olive and Squidgy test a new high-speed jet.
| 56 | 4 | "Count's Creepy Critters" | Romania (1450s) | June 21, 2016 |
Justin has to feed the Count's pets.
| 57 | 5 | "Chilly Copter Rescue" | Canada (2000s) | June 22, 2016 |
Justin pilots a rescue helicopter with instructions from Olive.
| 58 | 6 | "Haggis Heave Ho!" | Scotland (1700s) | June 22, 2016 |
The Justin, Olive and Squidgy clan competes with the McDougal clan in some Olympic-style games.
| 59 | 7 | "Clash of Colours" | India (Late 1700s) | June 23, 2016 |
Justin has to help Preeti the elephant choose the best color for the Holi festival.
| 60 | 8 | "The Deepest Dive" | America (2010s) | June 23, 2016 |
Justin dives to the deepest part of the ocean.
| 61 | 9 | "Babushka's Bear" | Russia (1980s) | June 24, 2016 |
| 62 | 10 | "Babushka's Bear" | Russia (1980s) | June 24, 2016 |
In this two-part episode, Justin, Olive and Squidgy act as "super sneaky spies" to prevent "Sneaky Sergey" (played by Sammy) from stealing a Matryoshka doll.
| 63 | 11 | "Race for the Bronze Ram" | Greece (1950s) | November 14, 2016 |
Justin and his friends, as archaeologists, compete against their rival Sebastian (Sammy) to find "The Bronze Ram".
| 64 | 12 | "Shortcut Cake Drop" | Vietnam (1500s) | November 14, 2016 |
Justin takes shortcuts to help Olive bring her moon cakes to the Mid-Autumn Festival.
| 65 | 13 | "The Mightiest Reindeer" | Russia (1000 BC) | November 15, 2016 |
Justin and Squidgy help Olive and her reindeer.
| 66 | 14 | "The Bumbling Knight" | Wales (450 AD) | November 15, 2016 |
Justin has to protect the King's castle from "The Bumbling Knight".
| 67 | 15 | "Let's Haka Dance" | New Zealand (Late 1700s) | November 16, 2016 |
Justin travels to New Zealand to learn the Haka dance.
| 68 | 16 | "Big Drum Jam" | Japan (1750s) | November 16, 2016 |
Justin plays the drums for the Tanabata festival.
| 69 | 17 | "Sky High Ski Jump" | Switzerland (1950s) | November 17, 2016 |
Justin learns the importance of following rules when he competes with Solomon (Sammy) to deliver something special to a Swiss chalet inn.
| 70 | 18 | "Tricky Train Trek" | India (1890s) | November 17, 2016 |
Justin drives a train up the Darjeeling Himalayan Railway to prepare for the Diwali festival.
| 71 | 19 | "Chasqui Chase" | Peru (1500) | November 18, 2016 |
Justin, Olive and Squidgy act as chasquis to bring ice to the Inca king.
| 72 | 20 | "Dolphin Dilemma" | Brazil (2010s) | November 18, 2016 |
Justin helps Olive find a rare pink Amazon river dolphin.
| 73 | 21 | "Who Stole My Cat?" | America (1940s) | November 21, 2016 |
In this parody of film noir, Justin has to help Olive the detective find her client's missing cat.
| 74 | 22 | "Piñata Smash Party" | Mexico (1990s) | November 22, 2016 |
Justin visits a Mexican piñata festival.
| 75 | 23 | "Soggy Soaker Showdown" | Canada (1890s) | November 23, 2016 |
Justin, as a Mountie, has to protect a shipment of special cargo from "Soggy Sammy" on Canada Day.
| 76 | 24 | "Big Big Dino Dig" | Mongolia (1923) | November 24, 2016 |
Justin, Olive and Squidgy, as paleontologists, compete with Sammy to find the "Colossosaurus rex".
| 77 | 25 | "Cuckoo Chaos" | China; India; England (Early 1930s) | November 25, 2016 |
| 78 | 26 | "Cuckoo Chaos" | China; India; England (Early 1930s) | November 25, 2016 |
In this two-part episode, Justin, Olive and Squidgy, as clock-keepers, have to prevent Samuel Schnoozelnein (Sammy) from destroying three of the world's biggest clocks.
