= Justin Time (TV series) =

Canadian animated TV series

- Genre: Adventure; Comedy
- Created by: Brandon James Scott
- Developed by: Frank Falcone; Mary Bredin; Brandon James Scott
- Directed by: Harold Harris
- Voices of: Gage Munroe; Jenna Warren; Scott McCord; Drew Davis
- Theme music composer: Carl Lenox; Blackburn
- Opening theme: "Justin Time" (performed by Carl Lenox and featuring Blackburn)
- Ending theme: "Justin Time" (instrumental)
- Composers: Asher Lenz; Stephen Skratt
- Country of origin: Canada
- Original language: English
- No. of seasons: 3
- No. of episodes: 76 (list of episodes)

Production
- Executive producers: Frank Falcone; Mary Bredin
- Producers: Kristine Klonk (S3); Vanessa Wong (S3)
- Running time: 22 minutes
- Production company: Guru Studio

Original release
- Network: Family Jr. (Note: Known as Disney Junior Canada until April 16, 2015) (Canada); Netflix (season 3)
- Release: September 23, 2011 – June 24, 2016

Justin Time is a Canadian animated television series created by Brandon James Scott and developed by Frank Falcone, Mary Bredin, and James Scott. The series premiered on September 23, 2011, with the finale airing on June 24, 2016. 39 episodes with 76 segments were produced. The show was broadcast on Family Junior.

== Premise ==
The series revolves around the adventures of Justin. In each episode, Justin encounters a problem of everyday childhood (such as sharing, teamwork, or paying attention). Then, Justin and his shape-shifting sidekick Squidgy solve the problems by tackling them in adventures through time and around the world. In every adventure, Justin and Squidgy meet their best friend Olive, who is always present in the place and time they are visiting, and who usually needs their help to accomplish a task. Together, the three of them encounter the same problem that Justin faces in his world, and together they solve the problem before he gets called back by his parents to his world.

In the original concept, Justin travelled via a time machine, which led to the title "Justin Time". Because the concept of "the past" is challenging for preschoolers, the TV series instead focuses on more developmentally appropriate adventures of fun.

== Episodes ==
Season	Segments	Episodes	Originally released	
Season	Segments	Episodes	First released	Last released
1	26	13	September 23, 2011	December 28, 2012
2	26	13	September 6, 2013	January 17, 2014
3 (GO!)	24	13	June 20, 2016 (Netflix)	November 25, 2016

== Characters ==
=== Main ===
- Justin (voiced by Gage Munroe in seasons 1–2, Drew Davis in season 3) is a happy Canadian 8-year-old boy with a positive outlook on life who jumps into action. He is the leader of the team and supervises although sometimes being unsure about being in charge. He learns life skills in each episode and takes care of his two friends Squidgy and Olive.
- Squidgy (voiced by Scott McCord) is a big source of fun and comedy in Justin Time. A blogger said he is "a tub of Kooky Clay come to life". Squidgy tends to befriend everyone and everything he sees. He has the ability to speak to all animals except for snakes, which he is scared of.
- Olive (voiced by Jenna Warren) is a 13-year-old girl who stands for friendship in Justin Time. She appears in every place that Justin and Squidgy visit and is the first friend they meet as each adventure begins. Her hair and attire usually changes to match the adventure. Usually through Olive's job, she encounters problems that needs to be solved.

=== Supporting ===
- Justin's mom (voiced by Heather Bambrick) is Justin's caring mother.
- Olive's Grandpa
- Monty is a mammoth.
- Cleopatra is a museum princess girl.
- Pierre is a friend of Justin and Squidgy.
- Sammy is Justin's neighbor.

== Production and reception ==
In November 2014, it was announced that Disney Junior Canada and Netflix had ordered a third season of Justin Time, to be entitled Justin Time: The New Adventures on Netflix. The 13 half-hour episodes were set to be released in 2016.

Justin Time was nominated for a 2013 Daytime Emmy Award for Outstanding Preschool Animated Program and twice for an Annie Award for Best Animated Television Production for Preschool Children. It was also nominated for three Canadian Screen Awards, in the Best Pre-School Program or Series category, winning one in 2014.

== Broadcast ==
Justin Time aired on Disney Junior (later Family Jr) in Canada, on Tiny Pop in the United Kingdom, and on Sprout (later Universal Kids), NBC Kids and later Netflix in the United States until April 2026. It also aired on Télémagino in French in Canada, Tiny Pop in the United Kingdom, Mentari TV in Indonesia, TV3 in Malaysia, Rai Yoyo, Boomerang (Italy) (Later Cartoonito (Italy) in Italy, TNT and Tiji (Russia) in Russia, France 4 in France and RTL Telekids in Netherlands. From January 1 to February 26, 2021, it aired on Ion Television's Qubo. DVDs were released in the United States by Cinedigm.

On April 1, 2026, the series was removed from Netflix in the USA. its third season was also removed on June 25 of the same year.
