= Atomic Puppet =

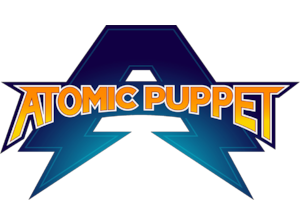
- Genre: Action; Adventure; Science fiction Comedy; Superhero
- Created by: Mark Drop; Jerry Leibowitz
- Developed by: Travis Williams; John Derevlany; Brad Birch
- Voices of: Eric Bauza; Peter Oldring; Lisa Norton; Carlos Díaz; Kristina Nicoll; Katie Griffin; David Huband; Scott McCord; Heather Bambrick; Robert Tinkler; Martin Roach; Mark Edwards; Kevin Hanchard; Rick Miller
- Theme music composer: Amaury Bernier; David Gana
- Opening theme: "Atomic Puppet Main Title"
- Composers: Amaury Bernier; David Gana
- Countries of origin: Canada; France
- Original languages: English; French
- No. of seasons: 1
- No. of episodes: 26 (50 segments)

Production
- Executive producers: Clint Eland; Steven Wendland; Pierre Belaïsch
- Producers: Chantal Ling; Travis Williams; Mark Dhrami; Thierry Rivard; Heath Kenny
- Editor: John McKinnon
- Running time: 22 minutes (11 minutes per segment)
- Production companies: Mercury Filmworks; French VFX; Technicolor; Gaumont Animation

Original release
- Network: Teletoon (Canada); France 4 (France); Disney XD (worldwide)
- Release: July 18, 2016 – February 21, 2017

Atomic Puppet is a Canadian-French animated television series created by Jerry Leibowitz and Mark Drop. The series is a co-production between Canadian independent animation studio Mercury Filmworks, French VFX, motion graphics and animation company Technicolor and French film studio Gaumont's animation division Gaumont Animation. The series premiered on Teletoon in Canada, on France 4 in France, and on Disney XD worldwide. It made its debut on July 18, 2016 on Disney XD in the United States, with the final episode airing on February 21, 2017. A total of 26 episodes were produced.

The series revolves around the adventures of seventh grader Joey Felt and his partner AP, a world-renowned superhero who has been reduced to life as a powerless, blue sock puppet, until he's placed on Joey's hand. Together, the two transform into Mega City's newest superhero duo, Atomic Puppet.

== Plot ==
Mega City's superhero Captain Atomic suffers a setback, as he is shaking hands with 12-year-old fanboy Joey Felt, his disgruntled sidekick Mookie (or Sergeant Subatomic) transforms him into a living sock puppet. The suddenly powerless superhero quickly realizes that the only way he can regain his former powers is to team up with the boy—a dream come true for Joey, but not so much for Captain Atomic. Together, the two form an unlikely and awkward partnership that allows them to become the city's newest superhero duo — Atomic Puppet.

== Characters ==
=== Main ===
- Joseph "Joey" Felt (voiced by Eric Bauza) is the main protagonist of the series. He is a 12-year-old comic book fan. Through a chance turn of events, he develops the ability to combine with his superhero idol, and together they form a new hero, Atomic Puppet.
- Captain Atomic/Atomic Puppet/AP (voiced by Eric Bauza) was a world-renowned superhero who lived his life being able to handle situations with his brute strength and endless charm. Blinded by success and fame, he is transformed into a powerless, blue sock puppet by his jealous sidekick Mookie. Now he goes by the name AP and, due to his massive ego and short temper, struggles with adjusting to his new life as a puppet and the fact that he can only access his former powers when Joey places him on his hand, turning them into Atomic Puppet.

=== Supporting ===
- Pauline Bell (voiced by Lisa Norton) is Joey's best friend and the only person other than Mookie and the other superheroes that knows of Joey's secret identity. Pauline occasionally covers for Joey when he needs an excuse to become Atomic Puppet, and has fought alongside Atomic Puppet if the situation called for it. She has a job at a comic bookshop owned by her uncle.
- Philip "Phil" Felt (voiced by Carlos Díaz) is Joey's burly, rugged, no-nonsense father. He's impatient, opinionated, and does everything he can to counteract his wife's babying of the kids. During the final episode, he learns the truth about Joey and AP.
- Vivian Felt (voiced by Kristina Nicoll) is Joey's sweet but overly caring mother. She worries far too much about her children and is always concerned about what kind of trouble they could get into.
- Abigail Felt (voiced by Katie Griffin) is Joey's energetic 8-year-old sister who goes by the nickname "Abs" or "Abbie".
- Bubbles is an orange tabby cat and the family's slow-witted, overweight, and flatulent pet. AP refers to him as Disastro and is convinced that Bubbles is an undercover villain plotting to take down Atomic Puppet from the inside, while Phil completely adores Bubbles, describing him as "the most adorable kitty-kat in the world".
- Rex Bordeaux (voiced by David Huband) is the egotistical host of Mega City news. As the city's #1 newsman, he climbed his way to celebrity status by reporting on the feats of Captain Atomic, but his reputation is in danger of slipping with Captain Atomic's "disappearance".

=== Villains ===
- Sergeant Subatomic: The Nuclear Boy (Mookie) (voiced by Peter Oldring) is the main antagonist of the series. Mookie is Captain Atomic's bitter and envious former sidekick and is responsible for his transformation into a puppet, done in an attempt to replace him as Mega City's protector. While Mookie does have a wide assortment of gadgets to use, by himself, he's nothing more than a glory hound that lives in his mother's basement. He frequently tries to force the citizens of Mega City to accept him as their hero, but his incompetence and lack of superpowers fail to win them over.
- Professor Tite-Gripp (voiced by Rick Miller) is a cunning and ruthless criminal with massive mechanical hands that give him superhuman strength. He was originally Captain Atomic's archenemy and is now Atomic Puppet's most dangerous foe.
- Naughty Kitty (voiced by Heather Bambrick) is a female thief who wears a black cat costume and steals cats. She is a parody of Catwoman.
- Zorp (voiced by Robert Tinkler) is a green-skinned alien invader who intends to capture the citizens of Mega City and eat them. He is often accompanied by a smaller alien of his species known as Flert.
- Mudman (voiced by Robert Tinkler) is a humanoid creature made of mud who can change his shape and possess others by smothering himself over them. He has a cousin named Dirtbag, a large sack-like creature able to breathe blasts of soil, who has also tangled with Joey and AP.
- Ms. Erlenmeyer/Queen Mindbender (voiced by Kristina Nicoll) is Joey's bitter science teacher who is driven to madness by AP when he attempts to stop her from putting Joey in detention. Afterward, she marries a mysterious alien and is transformed into a green-skinned telepath named Queen Mindbender.
- The Were-Chicken is a mutant chicken who appears in "Something Chicken" as the main antagonist.
- Commander Atomic and Puppet Boy are a pair of opposite villains in the episode "Parallel Puppet", who both serve as the main antagonists.

=== Heroes ===
- Justice Alliance is a superhero team that protects the galaxy at large. Prior to his transformation, Captain Atomic was a member, and he has rejoined as Atomic Puppet.
  - Commander Cavalier (voiced by Robert Tinkler) is a hero with heat vision powers. He is extremely obsessed with his appearance, to the point where showing him a mirror will always cause him to stop and admire himself.
  - Robo-Ron (voiced by Martin Roach) is a cyborg superhero who only speaks in beatbox and printed messages. Although he possesses a wide range of gadgetry and is incredibly intelligent, he is considered the least powerful member of the alliance.
  - Crimson Beacon is a quiet superhero with flaming hair, resembling Firestorm. It has the ability to create almost anything, similar to Green Lantern.
- Princess War Tickle (voiced by Kristina Nicoll) is a superheroine, very similar to Wonder Woman who dwells in a magical castle in the sky. She has an ongoing rivalry with Captain Atomic, as she is the only hero who rivals Captain Atomic in power and fame.
- Dyna-Moe: A friendly country superhero who left town after he failed to defeat Dirtbag. The mayor used him as part of a scheme to get rid of AP and Nuclear Boy permanently, only for Dirtbag to show up.

=== Others ===
- Rudolph Mintenberg (voiced by Scott McCord) is an eccentric billionaire who lives in a hilltop mansion outside Mega City. He is constantly bored and entertains himself by with a variety of dangerous gadgets and experiments, forcing Joey and AP to step in and save the day.
- Warren Beasley (voiced by Mark Edwards) is a nosy nerd who lives next door to Joey. His hobby is spying on his neighbors and classmates.
- The Mayor (voiced by Kevin Hanchard) is the mayor of Mega City. He often tries to replace Atomic Puppet because he dislikes the collateral damage they cause in their battles against their various foes.

== Episodes ==
No.	Title	Written by	Storyboard by	Original release date
1	"Sick Day"	Brad Birch	Kyle Marshall	July 18, 2016
1	"AP vs. Disastro"	Craig Martin	Khalil Ben Naamane	July 18, 2016
Joey has the flu, which prevents him from doing his superhero duties and gives Mookie the opportunity to try to take over them. Joey is forced to take Bubbles to a cat lovers convention, but Naughty Kitty attacks the event and steals Bubbles.
2	"Atomic Detention"	Evan Thaler Hickey	Kyle Marshall	July 19, 2016
2	"Big Pickle"	Josh Saltzman	Jeff Barker	July 19, 2016
AP's attempts to get Joey out of detention from Ms. Erlenmeyer only make things worse. When AP gets trapped in an indestructible pickle jar, Joey must take him to Professor Tite-Gripp for help.
3	"Pizza Planet"	Daniel Bryan Franklin & Robin Stein	Steve Stefanelli	July 20, 2016
3	"Don't Track the Mudman"	Josh Saltzman	Dipesh Mistry	July 20, 2016
AP believes that the employees of the space-themed pizzeria Pizza Planet are aliens that intend to fatten the customers for eating. After defeating the Mudman, AP takes a piece of him home, but the piece reconstructs itself and possesses Vivian.
4	"Justice Alliance"	Brad Birch	Dipesh Mistry	July 21, 2016
4	"Bad Lair Day"	Andrew Harrison	Jeff Barker	July 21, 2016
The Justice Alliance comes to Mega City to invite Atomic Puppet into their group, but a jealous Mookie tries to destroy them. Joey and AP move into Captain Atomic's former secret lair.
5	"Master of Disaster"	Mathilde Maraninchi & Antonin Poirée	Guilain De Aguiar	July 22, 2016
5	"Atomic Hairball"	Jérôme Erbin & Eddy Fluchon	Alexandre Viano	July 22, 2016
To defeat a teleporting monster, Joey and AP must take lessons from Captain Atomic's mentor, Master Sensei, who is now a doddering old man. Bubbles is transformed into a giant monster after eating some of AP's yarn that is charged with his powers.
6	"Sold Out"	John Derevlany	Dipesh Mistry	July 25, 2016
6	"Sword Sisters"	Ann Austen	Dipesh Mistry	July 25, 2016
Joey and AP try to sneak into a movie theater when Joey forgets to buy tickets. Pauline gets her hands on a magical sword and becomes the superheroine Sword Sister.When the sword's power begins to driver her mad though, Joey and AP must find Princess War Tickle, the sword's original owner.
7	"Atomic Android"	Baljeet Rai	Paul Herve	July 26, 2016
7	"Soft Spot"	Pierre Gilles-Stehr	Matthieu Pitschon	July 26, 2016
When Joey realizes that Warren knows his secret identity, he gets Robo-Ron to build him a mechanical duplicate as a red herring. AP becomes a gentle pacifist after being washed with fabric softener.
8	"Ultimate Collection"	Evan Thaler Hickey	Dipesh Mistry	July 27, 2016
8	"Media Darlings"	Brad Birch	Etienne Guignard	July 27, 2016
Joey goes on a quest to complete his collection of 132 Captain Atomic action figures when he learns there is a one-of-a-kind 133rd. Joey and AP compete with a new hair salon for media attention.
9	"Something Chicken"	Craig Martin	Jeff Bittle	October 31, 2016
9	"Bucket List"	Evan Thaler Hickey	Helder Mendonca	October 31, 2016
Joey and AP battle the Werechicken, a mutant chicken created by Rudolph Mintenberg that becomes a monster when exposed to moonlight. Joey and AP travel through time when Joey finds a list of superhero challenges he made when he was six.
10	"Big Blowout"	Baljeet Rai	Khalil Ben Naamane	July 28, 2016
10	"Quick Draw"	Albert Pereira-Lazaro & Manu Klotz	Terry Michaud	July 28, 2016
AP becomes more aggressive and bossy after being hit by the slime of a mucus-spewing monster. Joey and AP meet Mr. Inkwood, a crazed comic book artist with a grudge against Captain Atomic who gains powers after his pet octopus is affected by toxic waste.
11	"Atomic Goo"	Albert Pereira-Lazaro & Manu Klotz	Guilain De Aguiar	July 29, 2016
11	"AP vs. Disastro II"	Craig Martin	Alexandre Viano	July 29, 2016
Joey and AP accidentally super-glue themselves together, leaving them stuck in superhero form. Bubbles becomes an evil genius intent on destroying AP after eating a new genetically-modified brand of cat food.
12	"Absorbo-Lad"	Pierre-Gilles Stehr	Paul Herve	September 30, 2016
12	"Bend It Like Joey"	Pierre-Gilles Stehr	Dipesh Mistry	September 30, 2016
Atomic Puppet and the Justice Alliance battle Absorbo-Lad, a villain who can steal super-powers with his touch. Atomic Puppet and the Justice Alliance play soccer against alien invaders.
13	"Erlenmeyer's Revenge"	Baljeet Ral	Jeremy O'Neill	September 16, 2016
13	"Mole Men"	Brad Birch	Bruno Issaly	September 16, 2016
Ms. Erlenmeyer returns as Queen Mindbender and hypnotizes everyone except Pauline and AP. Atomic Puppet battles a race of subterranean mole people who have sunk Mega City's structures and kidnapped Pauline.
14	"Survival of the Feltest"	John McKinnon & Kyle Marshall	Kyle Marshall	January 31, 2017
14	"Tick'd Off"	Travis Williams	Jeremy O'Neill & Jeff Barker	January 31, 2017
Joey and Phil go on a father-son camping trip. Joey finds a talking redneck tick on the back of his neck who quickly makes a nuisance of himself.
15	"Surf 'n Turf"	Peter Saisselin	Bruno Issaly	February 1, 2017
15	"Monster Truck Invasion"	Jérôme Erbin & Eddy Fluchon	Alexandre Viano	February 1, 2017
Joey and AP help King Hydronomous, ruler of the deep, battle the villainous Megalo-Don. Joey and Phil go to a daredevil and monster truck rally that's actually a trap set up by Zorp to capture the people of Mega City and defeat Atomic Puppet.
16	"Snow Maniac"	Craig Martin	Matthieu Pitshcon	February 2, 2017
16	"Hero's Holiday"	Brad Birch	Jeremy O'Neill	February 2, 2017
After defeating the evil Snow Maniac, Joey and AP find out that she has returned in the form of Abigail's snowman to bring eternal winter to Mega City. AP encounters the Hero of Holidays Past, Present, and Future in the series' take on A Christmas Carol.
17	"Brawl-for-All!"	Eddy Fluchon	Bruno Issaly	February 3, 2017
17	"Down and Out Dyna-Moe"	Baljeet Raj	Matthew Pitschon	February 3, 2017
Atomic Puppet competes in a wrestling match against retired champion Manatee-Man to raise charity money. Atomic Puppet meets a country superhero named Dyna-Moe, who has been chased from his home by his archenemy Dirtbag, and the Mayor makes him Mega City's new protector.
18	"Mookie's Got the Power!"	Peter Saisselin	Bruno Issaly	February 6, 2017
18	"Buck Monkey"	Pierre-Gilles Stehr	Alexandre Viano	February 6, 2017
Mookie starts to develop superpowers after swallowing an alien crystal, but they wildly spiral out of control. Zorp mind controls a celebrity chimpanzee astronaut named Buck McDowall to get close to AP.
19	"These Shoes"	Brian Hartigan	Guilian De Aguiar	February 7, 2017
19	"Truce or Consequences"	Ann Austen	Paul Herve	February 7, 2017
Joey finds a pair of shoes called Lacer A.I. Hypertops, but the shoes are much more dangerous than they appear. Atomic Puppet crashes Princess War Tickle's party when they learn that she is planning a hero-villain truce with Professor Tite-Gripp.
20	"Atomic Weakness"	Craig Martin	Guilain De Aguilar	February 8, 2017
20	"Private Proton"	Brian Hartigan	Paul Herve	February 8, 2017
Chief Kevlar, the hot-tempered head of Mega City's police force, gets his hands on a power-draining meteorite that he uses to put an end to Atomic Puppet's vigilantism. Mookie alters Joey's mind so Joey will adore him instead of Captain Atomic and will be unable to recognize AP.
21	"The Switch"	Ann Austen	Helder Mendonca	February 9, 2017
21	"Lacer Takes Over"	Baljeet Raj	Paul Herve	February 9, 2017
The Switch: AP and Princess War Tickle get their minds switched. Lacer's A.I. takes over the body of Travis, a Ken-like doll that AP treats as a close friend.
22	"Worm Boy"	Ann Austen	Helder Mendonca	February 10, 2017
In part 1, Joey gains the abilities of a silkworm after being bitten by a silkworm, but loses his ability to merge with AP as a result. In part 2, Joey is captured by the insect-themed supervillain Bug-Man, who intends to steal his new powers.
23	"Hero Hall of Fame"	Brad Birch	Bruno Issal	February 13, 2017
23	"Parallel Puppet"	Brad Birch	Matthew Pitschon	February 13, 2017
Joey and AP go to see Captain Atomic's indoctrination into the Hero Hall of Fame, but Mookie arrives to try to steal the spotlight. Joey and AP encounter evil versions of themselves from a parallel universe and have to figure out how to send them home.
24	"Lil' AP"	Mathilde Maraninchi & Antonin Poiree	Guilain de Aguiar	February 14, 2017
24	"Pinched Nerves"	John McKinnon & Kyle Marshall	Jeff Barker & Steve Stefanelli	February 14, 2017
Queen Mindbender reduces the minds of everyone in Mega City, including AP, into those of young children. Joey gets badly shaken from almost accidentally killing Phil while chasing after a criminal and decides to take a break from being a superhero.
25	"Mintenberg's Armor"	Brad Birch	Jeremy O'Neill	February 15, 2017
25	"Claude Returns"	Brad Birch	Alexandre Viano	February 15, 2017
Mintenberg creates a superpowered mechanical suit to become Atomic Puppet's partner when he buys them a secret lair. Captain Atomic's powerless clone Claude (pronounced "clode") is unfrozen by Mookie and poses as Captain Atomic.
26	"The Big Shift"	John McKinnon & Brad Birch	Brian Coughlan	February 16, 2017
In part one, on the one-year anniversary of Atomic Puppet's first appearance and Captain Atomic's "disappearance", Mookie tells everyone that he killed Captain Atomic in one last attempt to make them accept him as their hero. Meanwhile, Joey and AP argue over if everyone should know that AP is Captain Atomic. In part two, Mookie teams up with Professor Tite-Gripp to lead a prison outbreak and destroy Atomic Puppet once and for all.

== Production ==
Series creators Mark Drop and Jerry Leibotwitz originally pitched the concept of Atomic Puppet to Mercury Filmworks in 2011. The studio took interest in the concept, but chose to redevelop it under the supervision of series developer Travis Williams and director Andy Coyle. One such change the team introduced was the idea of the titular sock puppet being a polymorphed superhero, but one that "had a bit bigger of an ego". They believed this would emphasize the humiliation of the character's transformation and force him to show his more vulnerable side.

According to Mercury Filmworks president Clint Eland, Atomic Puppet was envisioned as a comedic superhero-driven show focused on the close friendship between the main duo of Joey Felt and AP. Coyle and Williams both added that the show also intended to explore various genres, allowing the series to exhibit a wide range of tones and emotions. Additionally, Mercury Filmworks sought to have Joey and AP grows as characters through the pair's episodic adventures, with direction on the series focusing on character-driven elements to create characters the audience would grow attached to and who could be flexible enough for many kinds of story.

== Music ==
The music for the series was composed and performed by Amaury Laurent Bernier and David Gana.

== Broadcast ==
The series is designed as 52 11-minute segments, with 2 two-part specials. Atomic Puppet had its world premiere on Disney XD in France on March 13, 2016, and also aired on France 4 as well. The series later debuted on Disney XD in the United States as a sneak peek on May 30, 2016, before making its official debut on July 18. It also premiered on Disney XD in the United Kingdom on the same day as the US premiere. The series finally made its Canadian premiere on Teletoon in Canada on September 11, 2016, and Disney XD and ABC ME in Australia. In Latin America, it began airing on Disney XD on October 27, 2016.

All 26 episodes of the series were made available on Netflix in 2018. Four years later, the series was removed from the streamer in 2022 due to the rights expired. It is currently available to watch on the official YouTube channel, which begin uploading full episodes of the series in 2024.

== Reception ==
Atomic Puppet received rave reviews from professional critics and animators, who praised its animation, action, voice acting, premise, and humor.

The series was nominated in 2017 for two Annie Awards: Outstanding Achievement in Character Animation in an Animated TV/Broadcast Production and Outstanding Achievement in Storyboarding in an Animated TV/Broadcast Production. It was also nominated for a Reuben Award in the category of Television Animation, alongside The Loud House and The Simpsons, in 2016 by the National Cartoonists Society.

Dawn M. Burkes of The Dallas Morning News spoke positively on the series, calling it "a hoot of a superhero show". She praised its premise as fresh, unique, and entertaining, and its execution as making for a fun, humorous, and interesting take on the "old-school" superhero dynamic of the hero and his young sidekick.

On the other hand, the online animation community mostly dismissed the show as average. Emily Ashby of Common Sense Media gave this the show rate three stars out of five, describing it as "lighthearted buddy comedy is filled with fast-paced action and humor that's just right for grade-schoolers' liking." She also remarks about the messages that "stand out to kids aren't these kinds of [it]" and the humor "kind of exaggerated."
