= Heather Bambrick =

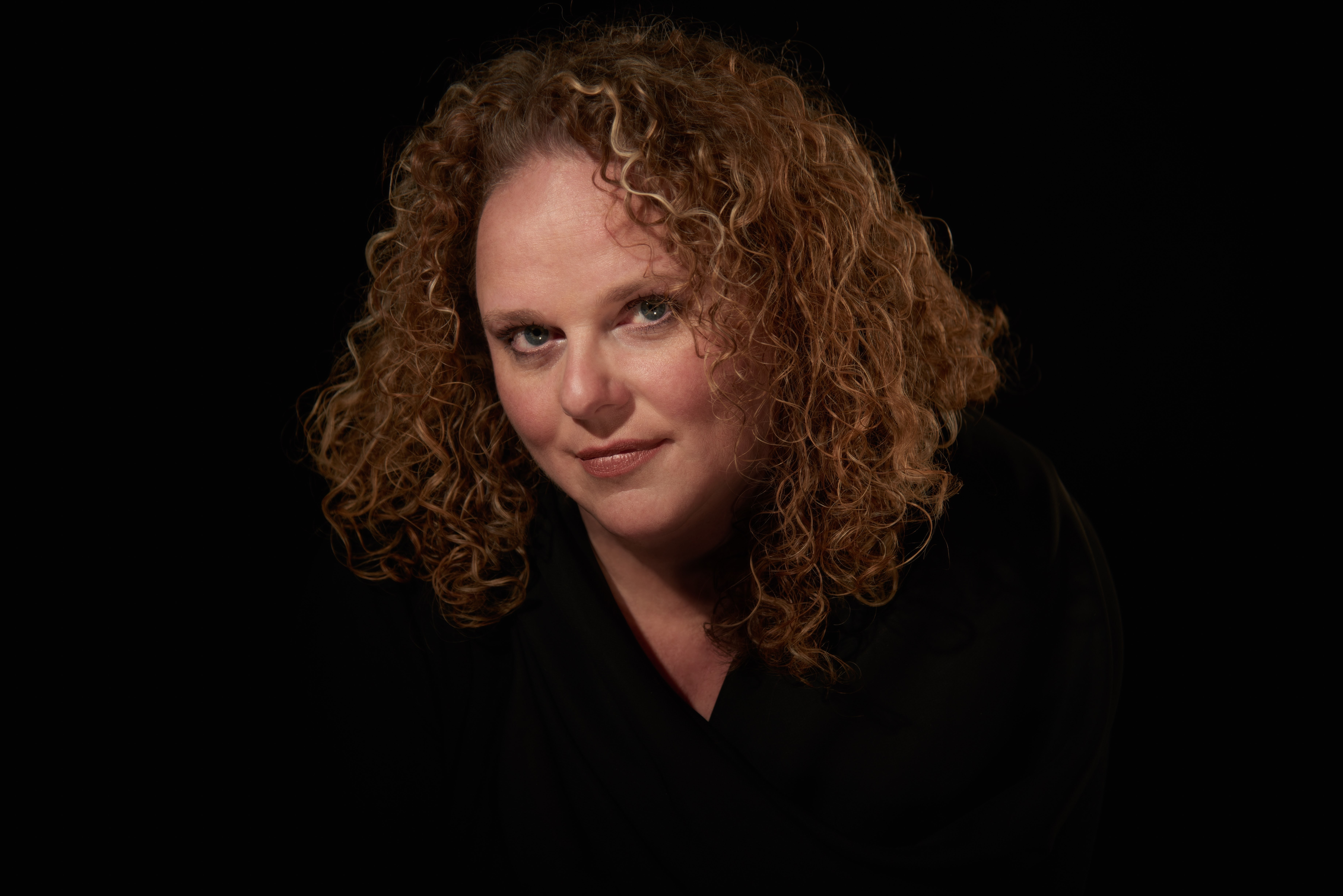
- Bambrick in 2018

Background information
- Born: January 19, 1971 (age 55); St. John's, Newfoundland and Labrador, Canada
- Genre: Jazz
- Occupations: Singer, voice over artist, broadcaster, teacher
- Website: www.heatherbambrick.ca

Heather Bambrick (born January 19, 1971) is a Canadian jazz singer, voice over artist, radio broadcaster and teacher based in Toronto, Ontario.

== Early life ==
Heather Bambrick was born in St. John's, Newfoundland and Labrador, to parents John and Joan Bambrick. She attended Holy Heart of Mary High School and was very active in the music program there, singing with their award-winning Chamber Choir. She went on to study Political Science and English at Memorial University of Newfoundland, graduating with a Bachelor of Arts degree. During her university studies, Bambrick began performing part-time as a dinner theatre actress in various productions and was singing with a number of community jazz choirs.

== Career ==
In 1993, Bambrick moved to Ontario to study at the University of Toronto as a Voice major in the Jazz Studies Department. She graduated in 1997, with a Bachelor of Music degree and began working as a freelance musician and teacher. She was a founding member of the Beehive Singers, and recorded with them on projects for Jaymz Bee and the Royal Jelly Orchestra, Carol Welsman, as well as on their self-titled album in 1990. The group disbanded soon after the release of their only recording, at which point Bambrick began a solo career, releasing several solo recordings, including It's About Time, Those Were The Days, (both of which were nominated for East Coast Music Awards) and You'll Never Know, the latter of which earned her a 2017 JUNO-Award nomination for Vocal Jazz Album of the Year, and a 2018 East Coast Music Award nomination for Jazz Recording of the Year. In June 2019, she released "Fine State", featuring more pop/rock-inspired arrangements, and making musical commentary about the world around her. In 2004, Bambrick was named "Jazz Vocalist of the Year" at the Canadian National Jazz Awards.

In between solo projects, Bambrick was a guest vocalist on several other recordings, including those for The Breithaupt Brothers, the Caliban Bassoon Quartet, Irving Dobbs, and the late Peter Appleyard. In 2012, she befriended voice over star Ron Rubin. Rubin introduced her to the Kratt Brothers, which subsequently led to her being cast as Koki in Wild Kratts. In her spare time from the program, she formed Broadsway with fellow Toronto-based artists Diane Leah and Julie Michels. Together, they released two studio recordings: Old Friends, and The Most Wonderful Time ... Maybe.

Beyond music, Bambrick is active as a voice actor on some commercial campaigns and television series, including Get Ed, Wild Kratts, Daniel Tiger's Neighborhood, The Ron James Show, Justin Time, Odd Job Jack, The Dating Guy, The Cat in the Hat Knows a Lot About That, Atomic Puppet, Hotel Transylvania: The Series, The Three Amigonauts, and several others. She currently voices Carl’s mom in the PBS show, Carl the Collector.

In 2001, Bambrick began work at JAZZ.FM91, in Toronto, where she has hosted several shows including "Sing, Sing, Sing", "Sunday Afternoon Jazz", "Wake Up ... with Heather Bambrick", "Jazzology", "The Heather Bambrick Show", and "Weekend B&B". She is a three-time nominee and two-time winner of "Broadcaster of the Year" at the National Jazz Awards and was awarded "Best On-Air Host, Music, Major Market" at the inaugural Canadian Radio Awards. She currently hosts "Wake Up! With Heather Bambrick", "Jazzology" and "Weekend B&B".

== Filmography ==
=== Film ===
Year	Title	Role	Notes
2007	Booky and the Secret Santa	Caroler #3	Television film
2018	The Daniel Tiger Movie: Won't You Be Our Neighbor?	Mom Tiger (voice)	
2020	Ludo	Ludo's Mom / Priya's Mom	
2021	Around the World in 80 Days	Fix (voice)	English dub

=== Television ===
Year	Title	Role	Notes
2005–2006	Get Ed	DJ Dive (voice)	Recurring role
2006–2007	Odd Job Jack	Julie / Donna the Refurbisher / Showgirl (voice)	3 episodes
2009–2010	The Dating Guy	Roberta / Goldie / Groupie (voice)	2 episodes
2010–2011	The Cat in the Hat Knows a Lot About That!	Various voices (voice)	3 episodes
2011–2020	Wild Kratts	Koki (voice)	Main (season 1–5), guest (season 6); 93 episodes
2011–2013	Franklin and Friends	Various voices (voice)	3 episodes
2011	The Adventures of Chuck and Friends	Cindy-Lou (voice)	Episode: "Commercial Trucks / Rowdy and the Rock Star"
2011–2013; 2016	Justin Time	Hilda Pearson / various voices (voice)	Recurring (season 1), guest (season 2–3); 12 episodes
2012–2013	The Doozers	Chief Doozer (voice)	Recurring role (season 1); 8 episodes
2012–2019	Daniel Tiger's Neighborhood	Mom Tiger (voice)	Main role; 89 episodes
2013–2014	The Ron James Show	Nanny James (voice)	Recurring role; 4 episodes
2015	Camp Lakebottom	Additional voices (voice)	Episode: "Schwampbillies / Remember Fort Sunny Bottom"
2015	Super Why!	Additional voices (voice)	Episode: "Roxie's Missing Music Book"
2016–2017	Atomic Puppet	Naughty Kitty (voice)	Recurring role
2017	3 Amigonauts	Additional voices (voice)	Episode: "VIP Mistreatment"
2017–2019	Hotel Transylvania: The Series	Additional voices (voice)	6 episodes
2018	Cupcake & Dino: General Services	Additional voices (voice)	2 episodes
2019	Dragamonz	Fyra	Unknown episode(s)
2020	Blue's Clues & You!	Blitzen / Grape (voice)	2 episodes
2020	Clifford the Big Red Dog	Farmer Jones (voice)	2 episodes
2021	The Dog & Pony Show	Additional voices (voice)	Episode: "Whistling Trixie"
2023	Superbuns	Geemaw (voice)	Recurring role; 6 episodes
2023	Zokie of Planet Ruby	Granny Jan / The Motherloaf (voice)	2 episodes
2024	Murdoch Mysteries	Flower Lady	Episode: "Why is Everybody Singing?"
2024–present	Carl the Collector	Carl's Mama, Ms. Doe	Recurring role
