= Pig City (TV series) =

- Title card
- Created by: Andy Knight
- Developed by: Andy Knight; J.D. Smith
- Directed by: Andy Knight
- Composers: Noam Kaniel and David Vadant for Kia Productions
- Countries of origin: Canada; France
- No. of seasons: 3
- No. of episodes: 39

Production
- Executive producers: Jacques Pettigrew; Marie-Claude Beauchamp; Philippe Garell; Andrew Makarewicz; Andy Knight
- Producers: Jennifer Hibbard (seasons 1–2); Danielle Marceau (season 3)
- Running time: 22 minutes
- Production companies: CinéGroupe; AnimaKids Productions; Red Rover Studios

Original release
- Network: Teletoon (Canada); Fox Kids (international)
- Release: April 16, 2002 – January 10, 2004

Pig City is an animated television series co-produced by CinéGroupe, AnimaKids, and Red Rover Studios in association with MM Merchandisingmedia GmbH and original networks Teletoon in Canada, ProSieben in Germany, and Fox Kids internationally. Thirty-nine half-hour episodes were produced.

== Synopsis ==
The show features a teenage country pig (Mikey) moving to the big city to live with his wealthy cousins (Martha and Reggie).

== Cast ==
- Thor Bishopric as Mikey
- Philip Lemaistre as Reggie
- Emma Campbell as Martha
- Michael Yarmush as E. Brian
- Lindsay Abrahams as Betty
- Matt Holland as Dave
- Teddy Lee Dillon as Bob
- Pier Kohl as Uncle Porter
- Jennifer Seguin as Trish
- Harry Standjofski as Vice Principal Lardes
- Ellen David as Aunt Yardley
- Brett Watson as Link
- Ricky Mabe as Stig
- Pierre Lenior as Principal Hamhock

== Characters ==
- Mikey Hoggins is a 15-year-old country pig that goes to the big city to live with his cousins, Reggie and Martha. He can be described as humble.
- Reggie DeBoar is a rocker, complete with his own band, "Reggie and the Rashers".
- Martha DeBoar is a pig and Reggie's sister. She is a bit self-centered and also concerned with her looks.

== Episodes ==
The episode order below follows that of the original airdates on Teletoon, which also matches the season 1 episode order on Encore+.

=== Season 1 (2002) ===
No.	Title	Original release date
1	"Wag the Hog"	April 16, 2002
2	"Taking Care of Bacon"	April 23, 2002
3	"Pork Barrel Politics"	April 30, 2002
4	"Hogtied"	May 7, 2002
5	"Mr. Mikey"	May 14, 2002
6	"It's the Principal"	May 21, 2002
7	"Meteorite Madness"	May 28, 2002
8	"Porkstars"	June 4, 2002
9	"Raising a Stink"	June 11, 2002
10	"Pigmalion"	June 18, 2002
11	"Honey Mommy"	June 25, 2002
12	"Motivational Ham"	June 30, 2002
13	"Pork Up the Volume"	July 1, 2002

=== Season 2 (2002) ===
No.	Title	Original release date
14	"Bachelor Daze"	September 2, 2002
15	"Martha and the Razorbacks"	September 6, 2002
16	"Coming to Grips"	September 9, 2002
17	"Family Plot"	September 13, 2002
18	"Driven"	September 16, 2002
19	"Dear Martha"	September 20, 2002
20	"The Hogfather"	September 23, 2002
21	"Reggie vs. His Brain"	September 27, 2002
22	"Headcheese of the Class"	September 30, 2002
23	"Capitalist Pig"	October 4, 2002
24	"Pig in Japan"	October 7, 2002
25	"Pork n' Screams"	October 21, 2002
26	"Christmas Ham"	December 10, 2002

=== Season 3 (2003–04) ===
No.	Title	Original release date
27	"The Big Catch"	September 6, 2003
28	"A Geek of Our Own"	September 7, 2003
29	"Rind Date"	September 14, 2003
30	"The Royal Visit"	September 21, 2003
31	"Fame or Shame"	October 5, 2003
32	"Deep Space Swine"	October 12, 2003
33	"Rockey Night in Pork City"	October 19, 2003
34	"Metal Mayhem"	October 26, 2003
35	"Pigs on a Train"	November 2, 2003
36	"Pigs Don’t Plant Trees"	November 9, 2003
37	"Pigs on Ice"	November 23, 2003
38	"Snowblitzed"	November 30, 2003
39	"Northern Lightweights"	January 10, 2004

== Production ==
During production in 2001, the show was titled The Three Pigs. Originally, CinéGroupe's then-owner Lions Gate was attached to the show's production.

SMEC Media & Entertainment in Taiwan (uncredited) and SMEC Animation & Graphic Technology in China were the overseas animation studios for the series.

CinéGroupe's distribution arm distributed the series in Canada, the U.S., Asia, Australia and New Zealand, with Fox Kids Europe N.V. distributing in Europe, Latin America, the Middle East and Africa with servicing through Buena Vista International Television, co-producer AnimaKids distributing in France and MM Merchandisingmedia GmbH distributing in Germany.

== Release ==
=== Home video ===
In November 2002, a VHS and DVD volume was released in Canada by CinéGroupe Star titled "Pig City/Porcité - Volume 1". It contained the Series 1 episodes "Wag the Hog", "Hogtied" and "Porkstars". The VHS versions were released in both separate English and French versions, while the DVD counterpart featured both languages.

Although a promo as seen on the release showcases Volume 2 and Volume 3 sets for release in late 2002, they were never released.

=== Streaming ===
In March 2022, the Canada Media Fund's YouTube channel Encore+ uploaded episodes of the series in both English and French.

== Awards and nominations ==
Year	Association	Category	Nominee	Result	Ref.
2003	Gemini Awards	Best Animated Program or Series	Jacques Pettigrew	Nominated	

== Soundtrack ==
On December 3, 2002, Les Disques Star Records Inc. released a soundtrack CD in Canada called "Reggie and the Rashers", named after the band of the same name as featured in the show, and contained the songs sung by them. It was available in both English and French.

Three music videos from the soundtrack were included on CinéGroupe Star's "Double Trouble"/"Sacré Délire" VHS tapes with What's with Andy? and The Kids from Room 402 (one music video per volume).
