= Get Ed =

Animated television series

- Created by: Andy Knight
- Developed by: Simon Racioppa; Richard Elliott; Dan Smith; Thomas Hart
- Directed by: Andy Knight
- Starring: Lyon Smith; L. Dean Ifill; Megan Fahlenbock; Bailey Stocker; Peter Cugno; Tony Daniels; Jamie Watson; Jennifer Dale; Tony Rosato; Lorne Kennedy; James Rankin; Heather Bambrick
- Theme music composer: Amin Bhatia; Ari Posner
- Composers: Amin Bhatia; Ari Posner
- Countries of origin: United States; Canada
- No. of seasons: 1
- No. of episodes: 26

Production
- Executive producer: Thomas Hart
- Producers: Randi Yaffa; Daniele Araiche
- Running time: 25 minutes
- Production company: Jetix Animation Concepts

Original release
- Network: Jetix (Toon Disney & ABC Family)
- Release: September 19, 2005 – April 24, 2006

Get Ed is an animated television series about a genetically engineered teenage delivery boy who fights industrial crime in Progress City.

The show aired as a part of the Jetix programming block on the United States cable television network Toon Disney until the channel closed in 2009. The series also used to run on ABC Family before the channel switched to a non-animated format. Reruns aired in 2009 on Toon Disney's successor, Disney XD. It was the second original show produced for the Jetix block and for the Jetix channels worldwide, where the show aired in 2005.

== Plot ==
In the series, Ed is an "electro-genetically" enhanced teen who works for Dojo Deliveries, a courier service, in the futuristic Progress City. Ed uses his cyber sleuthing skills to thwart identity theft and other information-based crimes. He and his courier pals Burn, Deets, Fizz, and Loogie (accompanied by his puppet Dr. Pinch), along with their friend and mentor Ol’ Skool, must battle the ultimate evil – Mr. Bedlam, an industrialist who has taken over a significant portion of Progress City, employing stealing from, data mining, or outright destroying his competitors.

== Characters ==
=== Dojo Deliveries ===
- Ed, the Protector (voiced by Lyon Smith) - A genetically engineered teen made from the instructions of an ancient alien artifact found by Ol' Skool. As he tries to uncover his origins, he also works on the Dojo crew as a delivery boy. On top of delivering packages and figuring out his identity, Ed's side job is fighting evil. He has much equipment that he finds along his journey whose technology is far beyond the technology of Progress City, thought to be gifts from aliens for his use. Due to being created as a teenager, he lacks a lot of life experience and can be a little dense and gullible sometimes, but sometimes he gets flashes of future events that help him and his friends. His vehicle is an AI co-piloted hoverboard. His sign is "The Protector,” represented as a blue skull. Sometimes, his eyes glow red when he becomes angry or green when he becomes strict.
- Burn, the Warrior (voiced by L. Dean Ifill) - The unofficial second-in-command to Ol' Skool who takes pride in being the best of the Dojo group, but with the arrival of Ed, he feels his role in the group has been challenged. Because of this, he is hard on Ed every chance he gets but as the series progresses he starts to warm up to Ed. Although he is still hard on Ed now and again, he cares for him deep down. He also hates a lot of other courier teams. His vehicle is a flaming one-wheeled motorcycle. His sign is "The Warrior,” represented by an orange flame.
- Deets, the Dreamer (voiced by Megan Fahlenbock) - Originally named Sarah, she was forced to work for Bedlam because he captured her parents (also computer programmers), but Ol' Skool helped her save them and offered a place in the Dojo. She appears to have a crush on Ed, yet these feelings appear to be mutual. Her vehicle is a hand-held jet glider pack. Her sign is "The Dreamer,” represented by a pink closed eye.
- Fizz, the Builder (voiced by Bailey Stocker) - A very smart girl in her early teens who is most handy when it comes to technology, planning, and building new equipment for the Dojo. Her quick thinking saves the crew constantly. Her vehicle is a flying scooter. Her sign is "The Builder,” represented by a purple Pi symbol.
- Loogie, the Joker (voiced by Peter Cugno) - A scatterbrained and wacky teen comedian with a catfish puppet named Dr. Pinch on his left hand. Despite being disorganized and often reckless, Loogie is a valuable asset to the team when given the freedom to be silly. His vehicle is a pair of rocket-powered in-line skates. His sign is "The Joker,” represented by a teal swirl.
- Dr. Pinch (voiced by Peter Cugno) - A catfish puppet that is always on Loogie's left hand. Dr. Pinch is a split personality who is ironically far more rational than its owner, often critiquing or directly insulting Loogie or the other members of the group. A running gag is that it is left ambiguous if the puppet is actually alive, as Dr. Pinch has seemingly appeared in locations without Loogie's control and was able to have his brain scanned into a virtual reality.
- Anthony "Ol' Skool", the Teacher (voiced by Tony Daniels) - The older and knowledgeable leader of the Dojo, whose wisdom centers within the ways of delivery, among other things. He is only known as Ol' Skool by his friends. He built Ed from an artifact he found in a warehouse and constantly says he knows more about Ed than he does. He uses a normal skateboard, making him the only one who rides a vehicle that is not technologically advanced. He used to work with Simon Bedlam until Bedlam betrayed him. He also used to work for another delivery service called Bolt until someone made a book of procedures and they slowly dropped in the courier ranks.
- Torch (voiced by Tony Daniels) - An A.I. represented as a little floating fireball hologram with a face, who was found by Ed in one of Bedlam's older labs that were about to be destroyed. Ed saved Torch from the lab by downloading him, but he only had time to download his core personality. He can show Ed maps of the city and give Ed instructions on how to get to places more quickly.

=== Villains ===
- Mr. Bedlam (voiced by Jamie Watson) - A greedy bureaucrat determined to take control of Progress City, who continues to seek the information he desires. He and Ol' Skool were once business partners until Bedlam cheated him out and took the business all for himself, leaving Ol' Skool with nothing. Ol' Skool went on to start the Dojo. Most of Bedlam's interests, however, have changed to focus more on Ed's connection to certain alien artifacts. Bedlam leads armies of DNA clones, short Klowns, rude Twilighters, and different robots. He has been collecting certain items, as well as Ed's DNA as a means of changing his genetic signature to match Ed's.
- Kora (voiced by Jennifer Dale) - Bedlam's personal A.I. construct, who exists within the computer of Bedlam's lair as his digital assistant, and only appears as a golden hologram of a female's upper torso. She is cunning and brilliant to boot, sometimes making better schemes than Bedlam himself comes up with, but Bedlam still treats her like any other servant.
- Crouch (voiced by Tony Rosato) - Bedlam's robot CEO with a toaster for a head. Although not very well built (mainly because the company that made him and his family went out of business), he is also not a very smart robot, constantly acting immature and fears Bedlam's wrath above all else. Because of his incompetence and goofball antics, he is met with the wrath and mocking of Bedlam very often. After being asked by Kora as to why he keeps him around, Bedlam states "I need the toast".
  - Crumbelina - Crouch's robot wife who looks more like Crouch in a dress and a wig. Originally a computer simulation, she later appeared in the real world.
- Spyker (voiced by Lorne Kennedy) - A powerful Terminator-like flight and combat robot created by Bedlam to capture Ed.
- Omnirex - A large Tyrannosaurus. One Omnirex is owned by Bedlam.
- DNA Deliveries (voiced by James Rankin) - An agency of regenerating mailman clones that serve as a network of couriers under Bedlam's empire. They turn to slime upon defeat and usually say "DNA Deliveries at your service" and "Thanks for using DNA!".
- Hoopbots - Robotic soldiers that serve under Bedlam's empire.

=== Recurring characters ===
- DJ Dive (voiced by Heather Bambrick) - A radio show host that knows everything going on in the city, even broadcasting Bedlam's moves during his attempted takeover. Her voice is similar to that of the caretaker.
- Dirk Cheap (voiced by Jeff Lumby) - The sole employee of 'Dirk Cheap Deliveries', who reports to his mother, who insists that he address her as 'Dispatcher'.
- Zero - A robot created by Crouch under Bedlam's orders who suffered a failure that brought him his own consciousness. After that, he becomes a friend for Ed and the Dojo.
- Carni-Gizmo -
- Dr. Hong (voiced by Steve McHattie) - An elderly cyborg scientist with control over nonobots who was sent back in time by the future Bedlam to destroy Ed. He is feared by many citizens in Progress City due to his appearance, home, and experiments.
- Buster and Pit (voiced by Don Dickinson) - Two trash robots seen around almost every episode. In episode 17 ("Trashed"), Buster and Pit are two of the many robots who go on strike and stop working. To keep trash from piling up, the mayor has asked couriers to start hauling trash, credit per pound. When it was discovered that Bedlam has been stealing info from the trash, Ed, who has a new appreciation of trash robots, asks for their help.
- Rodney (voiced by Don Franks) - Ol'Skool's monk sensei, who always nicknames him "hot dog".
- The Caretaker (voiced by Heather Bambrick) - She protects the Machine and is responsible for hiding the alien objects in Progress City many years ago. The Caretaker secretly brings Ol'Skool instructions to create Ed because he will save both worlds (the Earth and the Caretaker's home planet).

== Production ==
Production was underway in March 2005, when the series was announced. The series was created by Andy Knight, and produced by his Toronto-based Red Rover Studios in association with Walt Disney Television Animation. The series was created as Disney Television Animation's first fully-3D computer animated television series.

== Episodes ==
No.	Title	Written by	Original release date
1	"Slammer"	Simon Racioppa & Richard Elliott	September 19, 2005
The Dojo crew run into a huge orb of light that gives Ed a mysterious package; Ed discovers he has a strange connection with the item inside it.
2	"Sunblock"	Jeffrey Alan Schechter	September 19, 2005
3	"Omnirex"	Dan Smith	September 26, 2005
4	"Torch"	Simon Racioppa & Richard Elliott	October 3, 2005
5	"Z3R0"	Victor Nicolle	October 10, 2005
6	"Bio Trap"	Thomas Hart	October 17, 2005
7	"Optigogs"	Jeffrey Alan Schechter	October 28, 2005
8	"Fizzled"	Dan Smith	November 4, 2005
9	"Neo-Dermis"	Erika Strobel	November 7, 2005
10	"Perspectives"	Simon Racioppa & Richard Elliott	November 18, 2005
11	"Momentum"	Erika Strobel	November 28, 2005
12	"Grim Tech"	Richard Clark	December 10, 2005
13	"Static"	Simon Racioppa & Richard Elliott	December 17, 2005 (Part 1)
14	"Static"	Simon Racioppa & Richard Elliott	January 23, 2006 (Part 2)
15	"Omnis"	Dale Schott	February 1, 2006
16	"Procedures"	Peter Sauder	February 6, 2006
17	"Trashed"	Richard Clark	February 13, 2006
18	"Wi-Fi"	Ben Joseph & Frank Young	February 19, 2006
19	"Basics"	Simon Racioppa & Richard Elliott	February 20, 2006
20	"Klowned"	Simon Racioppa & Richard Elliott	March 6, 2006
21	"Monument"	Richard Clark	March 13, 2006
22	"Locked"	Thomas Hart	March 24, 2006
23	"ZG"	Richard Clark	March 27, 2006
24	"Dilemma"	Simon Racioppa & Richard Elliott	April 17, 2006
25	"Ex-Machina"	Simon Racioppa & Richard Elliott	April 24, 2006
26	"Ex-Machina"	Simon Racioppa & Richard Elliott	April 24, 2006

== Awards ==
The show's opening theme music, by Amin Bhatia and Ari Posner, was nominated for the 2006 Primetime Emmy Award for Outstanding Main Title Theme Music.
