= Ned's Newt =

Multinational television series, 1997–2000

- Ned's Newt title screen
- Genre: Fantasy comedy
- Created by: Andy Knight; Mike Burgess
- Developed by: Andrew Nicholls; Darrell Vickers
- Directed by: Rick Marshall (season 1); Greg Sullivan (season 2); Michael Smukavic (season 3)
- Voices of: See voice cast below
- Theme music composer: Pure West
- Composer: Pure West
- Countries of origin: Canada; Germany
- Original language: English
- No. of seasons: 3
- No. of episodes: 39 (list of episodes)

Production
- Executive producers: Michael Hirsh; Darrell Vickers; Andy Knight; Patrick Loubert; Andrew Nicholls; Clive A. Smith; Peter Völkle
- Producers: Vince Commisso (season 1); Alexandra Waring (season 2)
- Running time: 22 minutes (11 minutes per segment)
- Production companies: Nelvana Limited; TMO-Loonland Film GmbH (Note: Known as TMO Film GmbH for season 1); Studio B Productions (season 2)

Original release
- Network: Teletoon (Canada); Super RTL (Germany)
- Release: October 17, 1997 – January 11, 2000

Ned's Newt is an animated television series created by Andy Knight and Mike Burgess and co-produced by Nelvana and German company TMO Film GmbH (later renamed as "TMO-Loonland Film GmbH" in seasons 2–3) in conjunction with Studio B Productions (season 2). The show features celebrity Harland Williams as the voice of Newton. It aired on Teletoon in Canada from October 17, 1997, to January 11, 2000. 39 episodes were produced.

== Synopsis ==
The series begins with 9-year-old Ned Flemkin finally scraping up enough money to buy a pet. However, upon reaching the pet store, the only thing he can afford is a newt. Ned names his new pet Newton, but is quickly tired of it since Newton constantly lies on the rock in his bowl. Complaining to the pet store owner that his new pet is not very active, the owner gives Ned a can of Zippo for Newt pet food, but warns Ned not to give his pet too much. Ned feeds Newton a little, but Newton does nothing. Ned leaves the can beside Newton's bowl and goes to bed.

That night, Newton crawls from his bowl and gulps down several mouthfuls of Zippo. Thus, the eats too much warning comes true: Newton grows 6 ft 0 in (1.83 m) tall, can talk (voiced by Harland Williams), and has the power to shape-shift. After Ned realizes this, he and Newton become the best of friends, but unfortunately, the effects of Zippo do not last forever. Newton often gets Ned into trouble, at which point the Zippo dissolves off. Newton shifts back to his small form, leaving Ned alone to convey the wrath of his parents.

The series recounts the misadventures of Ned attempting to live life normally while trying to keep Newton from being discovered.

== Episodes ==
Season	Episodes	Originally released	
Season	Episodes	First released	Last released
1	13	October 17, 1997	January 9, 1998
2	13	October 6, 1998	January 21, 1999
3	13	September 11, 1999	January 11, 2000

== Plot and themes ==
Each episode makes a habit of creating outrageous plots out of mundane tasks and settings. For example, after a fun weekend of playing, Ned exclaims he cannot wait for the next, but Newton suggests that they can build a time machine to relive the weekend. The idea soon leads to them accidentally being sent to the age of dinosaurs and altering the future. In another episode, to raise money for charity, Ned's friend Doogle digs a hole and stumbles across a race of subterranean trolls secretly planning domination of the world's metropolises.

Ned takes Newton everywhere and makes sure to keep some Zippo food with him at all times, just in case Newton turns back into a normal newt. Newton's powers almost always make things worse, mostly due to his poor understanding of society. Thus, when Ned explains that he's made a terrible mistake, such as giving 3 and a half million dollars to some passersby, Newton and Ned must work together to put things right. And although they usually succeed in doing so, Newton invariably changes back to newt form just in time to avoid being seen and Ned to get into trouble.

The series made extensive references to famous faces and popular culture at the time, relying heavily on Harland Williams' experience as a comedian and impressionist. Newton shifts into newt versions of many celebrities in each episode, such as Arnold Schwarzenegger, Humphrey Bogart, Clark Gable, etc. for comic effect, similar to Robin Williams' portrayal of the Genie from Disney's Aladdin. Newton also frequently breaks the fourth wall, especially in season 3, even going so far as to comment upon how poorly drawn his belly-button was at one point or whether newts should have belly-buttons at all.

For the final four episodes of season 3, Harland Williams was replaced by Ron Pardo as the voice of Newton.

In one third season episode ("Rear Bus Window"), Newton proclaims his exact species name vittercensis, which is not a cataloged member of the genus.

== Voice cast ==
- Harland Williams/Ron Pardo (episodes 36–39 only) as Newton
- Tracey Moore as Ned Flemkin
- Carolyn Scott as Sharon "Mom" Flemkin/Mrs. Leatrice Bunn
- Peter Keleghan as Eric "Dad" Flemkin
- Jonathan Wilson as Rusty McCabe
- Tracy Ryan as Linda Bliss
- Colin O'Meara as Doogle Pluck/Renfrew
- Jim Milington as The Usual Guy

Additional voices include, but are not limited to:

- Debra McGrath as Mrs. Pluck/Agent Spam/Lion 2
- Annick Obonsawin as Mallow/Blonde-Haired Girl Who Lost Her Kite
- Denis Akiyama as Guard/Elf
- Ian Thomas as Stanley Pluck
- Taborah Johnson
- Catherine Disher
- Peter Wildman
- Diane D'Aquila
- Rick Jones
- Tyrone Benskin
- John Stocker
- Jill Frappier
- Tony Daniels
- Louis Del Grande
- Ross Petty

== Broadcast and home media ==
The series aired on Teletoon from its launch day to December 31, 1999, with reruns until the early 2000s. In the United States, the series aired on Fox Kids starting on February 7, 1998, on Saturday mornings, but later changed to weekday mornings on October 6, 1998, to December 31, 1998. However, only the first season aired on Fox Kids in the U.S., while the series was never rebroadcast for many years. In Germany, the series debuted on free-to-air network Super RTL in September 1999.

The series also aired on the now-defunct Qubo (with seasons 2–3) from March 28, 2016, to July 27, 2018, and again starting from March 30 to July 24, 2020. It also aired on Cartoon Network in Australia, Jetix, Disney Channel in the United Kingdom and Southeast Asia, boyzChannel, UniMás, Toonturama, The Pet Network, Télétoon, The Comedy Channel, SABC 2, ProSieben Maxx, RTÉ2, Arutz HaYeladim, Telemundo Kids, and Cartoon Network Latin America (from 2000 to 2004). Teletoon Retro aired reruns of all 39 half-hour episodes from September 5, 2011, until it was pulled off the air in early 2012. The series aired on KidsCo in select markets.

Three VHS tapes, entitled "Home Alone with Newt", "Jurassic Joyride" and "Saturday Night Fervor" were released in the United States by Paramount Home Entertainment on March 23, 1999. Each VHS tape had two pairs of episodes. The videos were duplicated in EP/SLP mode. In Canada, the series was also released on VHS by Telegenic Entertainment.

As of 2023, the series is currently streaming on Tubi and Pluto TV. It is also still aired on Publik Khatulistiwa TV (PKTV), a local TV channel in Bontang, East Kalimantan, Indonesia, as part of the 4U Cartoon programming block.

== Reception ==
Mainstream reviews of Ned's Newt were mostly positive. Author and cartoonist Edward Gorey was a fan of the show, identifying Ned's Newt as the "greatest" animated show in a 1998 Newsday interview.

=== Awards ===
Ned's Newt was nominated for a Gemini Award in the category of "Best Animated Program or Series", and won a Canadian Screen Award for Best Writing in a Children's or Youth Program or Series for the episode "Back to the Futile".
