= 1998–99 United States network television schedule (daytime) =

The following is the 1998–99 daytime network television schedule for the six major English-language commercial broadcast networks in the United States in operation during that television season. It covers the weekday daytime hours from September 1998 to August 1999. The schedule is followed by a list per network of returning series, new series, and series canceled after the 1997–98 season.

Affiliates fill time periods not occupied by network programs with local or syndicated programming. PBS – which offers daytime programming through a children's program block, branded as PTV at the time – is not included, as its member television stations have local flexibility over most of their schedules and broadcast times for network shows may vary. Also not included is Pax TV (now Ion), a venture of Paxson Communications (now Ion Media) that debuted on August 31, 1998; although Pax carried a limited schedule of first-run programs in its early years, its schedule otherwise was composed mainly of syndicated reruns.

== Legend ==
- Light yellow indicates talk shows.
- Green indicates soap operas.
- Pink indicates game shows.
- Gold indicates news and public affairs programming.
- Light teal indicates sporting events.
- White indicates local programming.
- Light purple indicates children's and/or E/I-compliant programming.
- Gray indicates encore programming (e.g., reruns of prime-time programming).
- Aquamarine indicates other programs not applicable to the above categorizations.
- New series are highlighted in **bold**.

== Schedule ==
- All times correspond to U.S. Eastern and Pacific Time scheduling (except for some live sports or events). Except where affiliates slot certain programs outside their network-dictated timeslots, subtract one hour for Central, Mountain, Alaska, and Hawaii-Aleutian times.
- Local schedules may differ, as affiliates have the option to pre-empt or delay network programs. Such scheduling may be limited to preemptions caused by local or national breaking news or weather coverage (which may force stations to tape delay certain programs in overnight timeslots or defer them to a co-operated or other contracted station in their regular timeslot) and any major sports events scheduled to air in a weekday timeslot (mainly during major holidays). Stations may air shows at other times at their preference.

=== Monday–Friday ===
Network		7:00 am	7:30 am	8:00 am	8:30 am	9:00 am	9:30 am	10:00 am	10:30 am	11:00 am	11:30 am	noon	12:30 pm	1:00 pm	1:30 pm	2:00 pm	2:30 pm	3:00 pm	3:30 pm	4:00 pm	4:30 pm	5:00 pm	5:30 pm	6:00 pm	6:30 pm
ABC		Good Morning America with Lisa McRee and Kevin Newman				Local and/or syndicated programming				The View		Local and/or syndicated programming	Port Charles	All My Children		One Life to Live		General Hospital		Local and/or syndicated programming					ABC World News Tonight with Peter Jennings
CBS		CBS This Morning with Mark McEwen and Jane Robelot				Local and/or syndicated programming				The Price Is Right		Local and/or syndicated programming	The Young and the Restless		The Bold and the Beautiful	As the World Turns		Guiding Light		Local and/or syndicated programming					CBS Evening News with Dan Rather
NBC	Fall	Today with Katie Couric and Matt Lauer				Local and/or syndicated programming				Leeza^{+}		Sunset Beach		Days of Our Lives		Another World		Local and/or syndicated programming							NBC Nightly News with Tom Brokaw
NBC	Summer	Today with Katie Couric and Matt Lauer				Local and/or syndicated programming				Leeza^{+}		Sunset Beach		Days of Our Lives		**Passions** (7/5)		Local and/or syndicated programming							NBC Nightly News with Tom Brokaw
Fox	Fall	Local and/or syndicated programming		Bobby's World (R)	Life with Louie	Local and/or syndicated programming												Cartoon Cabana		Spider-Man	Mighty Morphin Power Rangers (Mon.-Thu.); Power Rangers in Space (Fri.)	Local and/or syndicated programming			
Fox	Mid-September	Local and/or syndicated programming		Bobby's World (R)	Life with Louie	Local and/or syndicated programming												Space Goofs (Mon.); Spider-Man (Tue.-Fri.)	Toonsylvania (Mon.); Mighty Morphin Power Rangers (Tue.-Fri.)	Goosebumps (Mon.); **Mystic Knights of Tir Na Nog** (Tue.-Fri.)	Goosebumps (Mon.); **Young Hercules** (Tue.-Fri.)	Local and/or syndicated programming			
Fox	October	Local and/or syndicated programming		The Magic School Bus (R)	Life with Louie (Mon./Fri.); Ned's Newt (Tue.-Thu.)	Local and/or syndicated programming												Space Goofs (Mon.); Spider-Man (Tue.-Fri.)	Toonsylvania (Mon.); Mighty Morphin Power Rangers (Tue.-Fri.)	Goosebumps (Mon.); **Mystic Knights of Tir Na Nog** (Tue.-Fri.)	Goosebumps (Mon.); **Young Hercules** (Tue.-Fri.)	Local and/or syndicated programming			
Fox	Winter	Local and/or syndicated programming		The Magic School Bus (R)	Life with Louie (Mon.); **The Mr. Potato Head Show** (Tue.); Space Goofs (Wed.); **The Secret Files of the Spy Dogs** (Thu.); **Oggy and the Cockroaches** (Fri.)	Local and/or syndicated programming												Spider-Man	Young Hercules	Power Rangers in Space	Mystic Knights of Tir Na Nog	Local and/or syndicated programming			
Fox	Spring	Local and/or syndicated programming		The Magic School Bus (R)	The Magic School Bus (R)	Local and/or syndicated programming												Spider-Man	Young Hercules	Power Rangers in Space	Mystic Knights of Tir Na Nog	Local and/or syndicated programming			
Fox	Summer	Local and/or syndicated programming		The Magic School Bus (R)	The Magic School Bus (R)	Local and/or syndicated programming												Mystic Knights of Tir Na Nog (Mon.); Power Rangers (Tue.-Fri.)	The Magician	Spider-Man	**The New Addams Family**	Local and/or syndicated programming			
Fox	August	Local and/or syndicated programming		The Magic School Bus (R)	The Magic School Bus (R)	Local and/or syndicated programming												Mighty Morphin Power Rangers	The Magician	Spider-Man	The New Woody Woodpecker Show	Local and/or syndicated programming			
The WB	Fall	Local and/or syndicated programming		Tiny Toon Adventures	Animaniacs	Local and/or syndicated programming												Pinky and the Brain	**Histeria!**	The New Batman/Superman Adventures		Local and/or syndicated programming			
The WB	Summer	Local and/or syndicated programming		Tiny Toon Adventures (Mon.-Tue., Thu.-Fri.); Histeria! (Wed.)	Histeria!	Local and/or syndicated programming												Pinky and the Brain	Animaniacs	The New Batman/Superman Adventures		Local and/or syndicated programming			

Notes:

- NBC allowed owned-and-operated and affiliated stations the preference of airing Another World and Days of Our Lives in reverse order from the network's recommended scheduling; this structure was carried over when Passions debuted in the 2:00 p.m. ET timeslot on July 5, 1999.
- Another World aired its last episode on June 25, 1999; the premiere of Passions was scheduled nine days after its timeslot predecessor's series finale due to NBC's scheduled coverage of the Wimbledon tennis tournament preempting the network's daytime schedule during the week of June 28.
- (+) On September 3, 1999, Leeza aired its final episode on NBC; the program moved to first-run syndication beginning with its September 13 episode. NBC returned the 11:00 a.m. ET hour to its affiliates on September 6; at that time, NBC reclaimed the 9:00 a.m. ET hour from its affiliates in order to air Later Today, a lifestyle and entertainment-oriented extension of Today.
- The time period that the first hour of the Fox Kids weekday block occupied was turned over to Fox-affiliated stations in September 1999. Prior to the change, some Fox stations had aired that hour of the block in the afternoon in order to air either local morning newscasts or syndicated programming.
- The WB turned over the morning timeslot occupied by part of its children's programming block to its affiliates on September 3, 1999. A few WB-affiliated stations (mostly major-market outlets owned by Tribune Broadcasting) deferred the block to the afternoon in order to air either local morning newscasts or syndicated programs.

=== Saturday ===
Network		7:00 am	7:30 am	8:00 am	8:30 am	9:00 am	9:30 am	10:00 am	10:30 am	11:00 am	11:30 am	noon	12:30 pm	1:00 pm	1:30 pm	2:00 pm	2:30 pm	3:00 pm	3:30 pm	4:00 pm	4:30 pm	5:00 pm	5:30 pm	6:00 pm	6:30 pm
ABC	Fall	Local and/or syndicated programming		**Hercules**	Disney's One Saturday Morning (featuring Doug, Recess, and Pepper Ann)				The Bugs Bunny and Tweety Show / Schoolhouse Rock! (11:26 am)		101 Dalmatians: The Series	The New Adventures of Winnie the Pooh	Squigglevision	ABC Sports and/or local programming					College Football on ABC						
ABC	December	Local and/or syndicated programming		**Hercules**	Disney's One Saturday Morning (featuring Doug, Recess, and Pepper Ann)				The Bugs Bunny and Tweety Show / Schoolhouse Rock! (11:26 am)		101 Dalmatians: The Series	The New Adventures of Winnie the Pooh	Squigglevision	ABC Sports and/or local programming				ABC Sports programming						Local news	ABC World News Saturday
ABC	May	Local and/or syndicated programming		101 Dalmatians: The Series	Disney's One Saturday Morning (featuring Doug, Recess, and Pepper Ann)				The Bugs Bunny and Tweety Show / Schoolhouse Rock! (11:26 am)		The New Adventures of Winnie the Pooh	**Mickey Mouse Works**	Squigglevision	ABC Sports and/or local programming				ABC Sports programming						Local news	ABC World News Saturday
CBS	Fall	**Franklin**	**Anatole**	**Dumb Bunnies**	**Flying Rhino Junior High**	CBS News Saturday Morning				**Birdz**	Tales from the Cryptkeeper (R)	SEC on CBS													
CBS	November	**Franklin**	**Anatole**	**Dumb Bunnies**	**Flying Rhino Junior High**	CBS News Saturday Morning				**Birdz**	**Mythic Warriors**	SEC on CBS													
CBS	Winter	**Rupert** (reruns)	**Anatole**	**Dumb Bunnies**	**Flying Rhino Junior High**	CBS News Saturday Morning				**Birdz**	**Mythic Warriors**	CBS Sports and/or local programming						CBS Sports programming						Local news	CBS Evening News
NBC		Local and/or syndicated programming		Today				Saved by the Bell: The New Class	Hang Time	**One World**	City Guys	Hang Time	NBA Inside Stuff	NBC Sports and/or local programming				NBC Sports programming						Local news	NBC Nightly News
Fox	Fall	Local and/or syndicated programming		**The Mr. Potato Head Show**	Power Rangers in Space	**Godzilla: The Series**	**Young Hercules**	**Mystic Knights of Tir Na Nog**	**The Secret Files of the Spy Dogs**	**Mad Jack the Pirate**	**Oggy and the Cockroaches**	Fox Sports and/or local programming													
Fox	Winter	Local and/or syndicated programming		Spider-Man	Power Rangers Power Playback	**Godzilla: The Series**	Power Rangers in Space	**Mystic Knights of Tir Na Nog**	Oggy and the Cockroaches	**Mad Jack the Pirate**	The Secret Files of the Spy Dogs	Fox Sports and/or local programming													
Fox	March	Local and/or syndicated programming		Spider-Man	Spider-Man	**Godzilla: The Series**	**Power Rangers Lost Galaxy**	**The Magician**	Power Rangers Power Playback	**Mad Jack the Pirate**	The Secret Files of the Spy Dogs	Fox Sports and/or local programming													
Fox	May	Local and/or syndicated programming		Spider-Man	Spider-Man	**Godzilla: The Series**	**Power Rangers Lost Galaxy**	**The Magician**	Power Rangers Power Playback	**The New Woody Woodpecker Show**	The Secret Files of the Spy Dogs	Fox Sports and/or local programming													
Fox	Summer	Local and/or syndicated programming		Donkey Kong Country	Spider-Man	**Godzilla: The Series**	**Power Rangers Lost Galaxy**	**The Magician**	**Digimon: Digital Monsters** (starting Aug. 14)	**The New Woody Woodpecker Show**	The Secret Files of the Spy Dogs	Local and/or syndicated programming	In the Zone	Fox Sports and/or local programming											
The WB	Fall	Local and/or syndicated programming		The New Batman/Superman Adventures		Men in Black: The Series	**Invasion America**	**Brats of the Lost Nebula**	**Pinky, Elmyra & the Brain**	The Sylvester & Tweety Mysteries	**Histeria!**	Local and/or syndicated programming													
The WB	November	Local and/or syndicated programming		The New Batman/Superman Adventures			Men in Black: The Series	Pinky, Elmyra & the Brain	The Sylvester & Tweety Mysteries	The Sylvester & Tweety Mysteries	**Histeria!**	Local and/or syndicated programming													
The WB	January	Local and/or syndicated programming		The New Batman/Superman Adventures		Men in Black: The Series	**Batman Beyond**	**The Big Cartoonie Show**			**Histeria!**	Local and/or syndicated programming													
The WB	February	Local and/or syndicated programming		The New Batman/Superman Adventures		Men in Black: The Series	**Batman Beyond**	**Pokémon**	The Big Cartoonie Show	Histeria!	The Sylvester & Tweety Mysteries	Local and/or syndicated programming													
The WB	July	Local and/or syndicated programming		The New Batman/Superman Adventures		Men in Black: The Series	**Batman Beyond**	**Pokémon**	The Big Cartoonie Show	Pokémon	The Sylvester & Tweety Mysteries	Local and/or syndicated programming													

Notes:

- Fox Kids originally intended to air a series based on Captain America at 10:30 a.m. ET, however Marvel Comics' then-recent bankruptcy caused the series to be cancelled during pre-production; hence, The Secret Files of the Spy Dogs was moved there from its originally intended weekday scheduling.
- Kids' WB also aired Invasion America at 10:00 a.m. ET until October 10.

=== Sunday ===
Network		7:00 am	7:30 am	8:00 am	8:30 am	9:00 am	9:30 am	10:00 am	10:30 am	11:00 am	11:30 am	noon	12:30 pm	1:00 pm	1:30 pm	2:00 pm	2:30 pm	3:00 pm	3:30 pm	4:00 pm	4:30 pm	5:00 pm	5:30 pm	6:00 pm	6:30 pm
ABC	Fall	Local and/or syndicated programming		Good Morning America Sunday		This Week with Sam & Cokie		Local and/or syndicated programming		ABC Sports and/or local programming														Local news	ABC World News Sunday
ABC	Spring	Local and/or syndicated programming				This Week with Sam & Cokie		Local and/or syndicated programming		ABC Sports and/or local programming														Local news	ABC World News Sunday
CBS	Fall	Local and/or syndicated programming				CBS News Sunday Morning			Face the Nation	Local and/or syndicated programming		**NFL Today**		NFL on CBS											
CBS	Mid-winter	Local and/or syndicated programming				CBS News Sunday Morning			Face the Nation	Local and/or syndicated programming		CBS Sports and/or local programming												Local news	CBS Evening News
NBC		Local and/or syndicated programming		Today		Meet the Press		Local and/or syndicated programming				NBC Sports and/or local programming												Local news	NBC Nightly News
Fox	Fall	Local and/or syndicated programming				Fox News Sunday		Local and/or syndicated programming				Fox NFL Sunday		Fox NFL (and sometimes another Fox Sports event)											
Fox	Mid-winter	Local and/or syndicated programming				Fox News Sunday		Local and/or syndicated programming				Fox Sports and/or local programming												Local and/or syndicated programming	
UPN		Algo's FACTory	Local and/or syndicated programming			Beetleborgs	Incredible Hulk and Friends	X-Men	Spider-Man	Local and/or syndicated programming															

== By network ==
=== ABC ===
Returning series:

- ABC World News This Morning
- ABC World News Tonight with Peter Jennings
- All My Children
- Disney's One Saturday Morning
  - 101 Dalmatians: The Series (reruns)
  - The Bugs Bunny and Tweety Show
  - Doug
  - The New Adventures of Winnie the Pooh (reruns)
  - Recess
  - Pepper Ann
  - Schoolhouse Rock! (reruns)
  - Squigglevision
- General Hospital
- Good Morning America
- Good Morning America Sunday
- One Life to Live
- Port Charles
- The View

New series:

- Disney's One Saturday Morning
  - **Hercules**
  - **Mickey Mouse Works**

Not returning from 1997–98:

- Disney's One Saturday Morning
  - Jungle Cubs

=== CBS ===
Returning series:

- As the World Turns
- The Bold and the Beautiful
- CBS Morning News
- CBS News Saturday Morning
- CBS This Morning
- CBS Evening News
- CBS News Sunday Morning
- Face the Nation
- Guiding Light
- The Price Is Right
- The Young and the Restless

New series:

- **Anatole**
- **Birdz**
- **Dumb Bunnies**
- **Flying Rhino Junior High**
- **Franklin**
- **Mythic Warriors**
- **Rupert** (reruns)
- Tales from the Cryptkeeper (reruns)

Not returning from 1997–98:

- Beakman's World
- CBS Storybreak (reruns)
- Fudge
- The New Ghostwriter Mysteries
- The Sports Illustrated for Kids Show
- The Weird Al Show
- Wheel 2000

=== NBC ===
Returning series:

- Another World
- Days of Our Lives
- Leeza
- NBC News at Sunrise
- NBC Nightly News
- Sunset Beach
- Today
- TNBC
  - City Guys
  - Hang Time
  - NBA Inside Stuff
  - Saved by the Bell: The New Class

New series:

- **Passions**
- TNBC
  - **One World**

=== Fox ===
Returning series:

- Fox Kids
  - Bobby's World (reruns)
  - Cartoon Cabana
  - Goosebumps
  - Life with Louie
  - Ned's Newt
  - Power Rangers Power Playback
  - Power Rangers in Space
  - Space Goofs
  - Spider-Man (reruns)
  - Toonsylvania
- Fox News Sunday
- In the Zone

New series:

- Fox Kids
  - **Digimon: Digital Monsters**
  - **Donkey Kong Country**
  - **Godzilla: The Series**
  - **Mad Jack the Pirate**
  - **The Magic School Bus** (reruns)
  - **The Magician**
  - **The Mr. Potato Head Show**
  - **Mystic Knights of Tir Na Nog**
  - **The New Addams Family**
  - **The New Woody Woodpecker Show**
  - **Oggy and the Cockroaches**
  - **Power Rangers Lost Galaxy**
  - **The Secret Files of the Spy Dogs**
  - **Young Hercules**

Not returning from 1997–98:

- Fox Kids
  - The Adventures of Sam & Max: Freelance Police
  - Beetleborgs Metallix (moved to UPN)
  - C Bear and Jamal
  - Eerie, Indiana
  - Eerie, Indiana: The Other Dimension
  - Mowgli: The New Adventures of the Jungle Book
  - Ninja Turtles: The Next Mutation
  - Power Rangers: Turbo
  - Power Rangers Zeo
  - Silver Surfer
  - The Spooktacular New Adventures of Casper
  - Stickin' Around
  - X-Men (moved to UPN)

=== UPN ===
Returning series:

- Algo's FACTory
- The Incredible Hulk (reruns)

New series:

- **Beetleborgs** (reruns) (moved from FOX)
- **Incredible Hulk and Friends** (reruns of The Incredible Hulk, **Fantastic Four** and **Iron Man**)
- **X-Men** (reruns) (moved from FOX)
- **Spider-Man** (reruns)
- **Spider-Man and His Amazing Friends** (reruns)

Not returning from 1997–98:

- Breaker High
- Jumanji (moved to BKN)
- Sweet Valley High

=== The WB ===
Returning series:

- Kids WB!
  - Animaniacs
  - Men in Black: The Series
  - The New Batman/Superman Adventures
  - Pinky and the Brain
  - The Sylvester & Tweety Mysteries
  - Tiny Toon Adventures

New series:

- Kids WB!
  - **Batman Beyond**
  - **The Big Cartoonie Show**
  - **Brats of the Lost Nebula**
  - **Histeria!**
  - **Invasion America**
  - **Pinky, Elmyra & the Brain**
  - **Pokémon**

Not returning from 1997–98:

- Kids WB!
  - Bugs 'n' Daffy
  - Captain Planet and the Planeteers (reruns)
  - Channel Umptee-3

== See also ==
- 1998–99 United States network television schedule (prime-time)
- 1998–99 United States network television schedule (late night)

== Sources ==
- Curt Alliaume. "ABC Daytime Schedule". Curt Alliaume’s Utterly Irrelevant Web Site. Archived from the original on October 15, 2007.
- Curt Alliaume. "CBS Daytime Schedule". Curt Alliaume’s Utterly Irrelevant Web Site. Archived from the original on October 15, 2007.
- Curt Alliaume. "NBC Daytime Schedule". Curt Alliaume’s Utterly Irrelevant Web Site. Archived from the original on October 12, 2007.
- "Fox Kids Weekday Lineups (1998-1999)". The Kids Block Blog. October 25, 2012.
- Aaron Greenhouse (October 11, 2000). "Kids WB! Schedule". Carnegie Mellon University.
- Aaron Greenhouse (October 16, 2001). "UPN Kids Broadcast Schedule". Carnegie Mellon University.
