= 2000–01 United States network television schedule (daytime) =

The following is the 2000–01 daytime network television schedule for the six major English-language commercial broadcast networks in the United States in operation during that television season. It covers the weekday daytime hours from September 2000 to August 2001. The schedule is followed by a list per network of returning series, new series, and series canceled after the 1999–2000 season.

Affiliates fill time periods not occupied by network programs with local or syndicated programming. PBS – which offers daytime programming through a children's program block, PBS Kids – is not included, as its member television stations have local flexibility over most of their schedules and broadcast times for network shows may vary. Also not included are stations affiliated with Pax TV, as its schedule is composed mainly of syndicated reruns although it also carried a limited schedule of first-run programs.

== Legend ==
- Light yellow indicates talk shows.
- Green indicates soap operas.
- Pink indicates game shows.
- Gold indicates news programming.
- White indicates local programming.
- Gray indicates encore programming (e.g., reruns of prime-time programming).
- Light teal indicates sporting events.
- Light purple indicates children's programming.
- New series are highlighted in **bold**.

== Schedule ==
- All times correspond to U.S. Eastern and Pacific Time scheduling (except for some live sports or events). Except where affiliates slot certain programs outside their network-dictated timeslots, subtract one hour for Central, Mountain, Alaska, and Hawaii-Aleutian times.
- Local schedules may differ, as affiliates have the option to pre-empt or delay network programs. Such scheduling may be limited to preemptions caused by local or national breaking news or weather coverage (which may force stations to tape delay certain programs in overnight timeslots or defer them to a co-operated or other contracted station in their regular timeslot) and any major sports events scheduled to air in a weekday timeslot (mainly during major holidays). Stations may air shows at other times at their preference.

=== Monday-Friday ===
Network		7:00 am	7:30 am	8:00 am	8:30 am	9:00 am	9:30 am	10:00 am	10:30 am	11:00 am	11:30 am	noon	12:30 pm	1:00 pm	1:30 pm	2:00 pm	2:30 pm	3:00 pm	3:30 pm	4:00 pm	4:30 pm	5:00 pm	5:30 pm	6:00 pm	6:30 pm
ABC		Good Morning America				Local and/or syndicated programming				The View		Local and/or syndicated programming	Port Charles	All My Children		One Life to Live		General Hospital		Local and/or syndicated programming					ABC World News Tonight with Peter Jennings
CBS		The Early Show				Local and/or syndicated programming				The Price is Right		Local and/or syndicated programming	The Young and the Restless		The Bold and the Beautiful	As the World Turns		Guiding Light		Local and/or syndicated programming					CBS Evening News with Dan Rather
NBC		Today						Local and/or syndicated programming						Days of Our Lives		Passions		Local and/or syndicated programming							NBC Nightly News with Tom Brokaw
Fox	Fall	The Magic School Bus	Local and/or syndicated programming															The Magic School Bus (Mon.); Dungeons & Dragons (Tue.-Thu.); Flint the Time Detective (Fri.)	Power Rangers Lightspeed Rescue (Mon.-Thu.); Dinozaurs (Fri.)	X-Men (Mon.-Thu.); Escaflowne (Fri.)	Digimon: Digital Monsters	Local and/or syndicated programming			
Fox	November	The Magic School Bus	Local and/or syndicated programming															The Magic School Bus (Mon.); Digimon: Digital Monsters (Tue.-Fri.)	Power Rangers Lightspeed Rescue	X-Men	Digimon: Digital Monsters	Local and/or syndicated programming			
Fox	Spring	The Magic School Bus	Local and/or syndicated programming															The Magic School Bus (Mon.); Action Man (Tue.-Fri.)	Big Guy and Rusty the Boy Robot (Mon.-Thu.); Power Rangers Time Force (Fri.)	Los Luchadores	Digimon: Digital Monsters	Local and/or syndicated programming			
Fox	Summer	The Magic School Bus	Local and/or syndicated programming															The Magic School Bus (Mon.); Action Man (Tue.-Fri.)	Big Guy and Rusty the Boy Robot (Mon.-Thu.); Power Rangers Time Force (Fri.)	Digimon: Digital Monsters	Digimon: Digital Monsters	Local and/or syndicated programming			
UPN		**Buzz Lightyear of Star Command**	Recess	**Sabrina: The Animated Series**	Pepper Ann	Local and/or syndicated programming																			
The WB	Fall	Pokémon	Histeria! (Mon.-Thu.); Batman Beyond (Fri.)	Local and/or syndicated programming														The Sylvester & Tweety Mysteries (Mon.-Thu.); Detention (Fri.)	Men in Black: The Series (Mon.-Thu.); Cardcaptors (Fri.)	Pokémon	Max Steel (Mon.); Batman Beyond (Tue-Thu.); **Generation O!** (Fri.)	Local and/or syndicated programming			
The WB	Winter	The Sylvester & Tweety Mysteries (Mon.-Thu.); Pokémon (Fri.)	Histeria! (Mon.-Thu.); Batman Beyond (Fri.)	Local and/or syndicated programming														Men in Black: The Series (Mon.-Thu.); Detention (Fri.)	Max Steel (Mon.); Batman Beyond (Tue.-Thu.); Generation O! (Fri.)	Pokémon (Mon.-Thu.); Pokémon: The Johto Journeys (Fri.)	Pokémon (Mon.-Thu.); Cardcaptors (Fri.)	Local and/or syndicated programming			
The WB	Spring	Men in Black: The Series (Mon.-Thu.); Pokémon (Fri.)	Histeria! (Mon.-Thu.); Max Steel (Fri.)	Local and/or syndicated programming														Batman Beyond (Mon.-Thu.); Detention (Fri.)	Batman Beyond (Mon.-Thu.); Generation O! (Fri.)	Pokémon (Mon.-Thu.); Pokémon: The Johto Journeys (Fri.)	Pokémon (Mon.-Thu.); Cardcaptors (Fri.)	Local and/or syndicated programming			
The WB	Summer	Men in Black: The Series	Histeria! (Mon.-Thu.); Max Steel (Fri.)	Local and/or syndicated programming														Batman Beyond (Mon.-Thu.); Detention (Fri.)	Pokémon (Mon.-Thu.); Generation O! (Fri.)	Pokémon (Mon.-Thu.); Pokémon: The Johto Journeys (Fri.)	Batman Beyond (Mon.-Thu.); Pokémon: The Johto Journeys (Fri.); **Dragon Ball Z** (Jul. 30-Aug. 10)	Local and/or syndicated programming			

Notes:

- NBC allowed owned-and-operated and affiliated stations the preference of airing Passions and Days of Our Lives in reverse order from the network's recommended scheduling, a structure held over from when Another World occupied the 2:00 p.m. ET timeslot prior to its discontinuance in July 1999.
- The WB returned its morning children's programming block to its affiliates on September 3. A few of its affiliates deferred the block to the afternoon in order to air morning newscasts or other syndicated programs.

=== Saturday ===
Network		7:00 am	7:30 am	8:00 am	8:30 am	9:00 am	9:30 am	10:00 am	10:30 am	11:00 am	11:30 am	noon	12:30 pm	1:00 pm	1:30 pm	2:00 pm	2:30 pm	3:00 pm	3:30 pm	4:00 pm	4:30 pm	5:00 pm	5:30 pm	6:00 pm	6:30 pm
ABC	Fall	Local and/or syndicated programming		Doug	Disney's One Saturday Morning (featuring The Weekenders, Recess, and **Teacher's Pet**)				Recess	Pepper Ann	Sabrina: The Animated Series	The New Adventures of Winnie the Pooh	Mickey Mouse Works	College Football on ABC											
ABC	October	Local and/or syndicated programming		Doug	Disney's One Saturday Morning (featuring The Weekenders, Recess, and **Teacher's Pet**)				**Buzz Lightyear of Star Command**	Pepper Ann	Sabrina: The Animated Series	The New Adventures of Winnie the Pooh	Mickey Mouse Works	College Football on ABC											
ABC	December	Local and/or syndicated programming		Sabrina: The Animated Series	The Weekenders	Recess		Teacher's Pet	**Buzz Lightyear of Star Command**	Doug	Pepper Ann	The New Adventures of Winnie the Pooh	Mickey Mouse Works	ABC Sports and/or local programming				ABC Sports programming						Local news	ABC World News Saturday
ABC	January	Local and/or syndicated programming		Sabrina: The Animated Series	The Weekenders	Recess		Teacher's Pet	**Buzz Lightyear of Star Command**	Doug	Pepper Ann	The New Adventures of Winnie the Pooh	**House of Mouse**	ABC Sports and/or local programming				ABC Sports programming						Local news	ABC World News Saturday
ABC	February	Local and/or syndicated programming		Sabrina: The Animated Series	The Weekenders	Recess		**Lloyd in Space**	Teacher's Pet	Buzz Lightyear of Star Command	Doug	The New Adventures of Winnie the Pooh	**House of Mouse**	ABC Sports and/or local programming				ABC Sports programming						Local news	ABC World News Saturday
CBS	Fall	**Blue's Clues**	**Dora the Explorer**	**Little Bear**	**Little Bill**	The Saturday Early Show				Franklin	**Kipper**	SEC on CBS													
CBS	Winter	**Blue's Clues**	**Dora the Explorer**	**Little Bear**	**Little Bill**	The Saturday Early Show				Franklin	**Kipper**	CBS Sports and/or local programming						CBS Sports programming						Local news	CBS Evening News
CBS	Spring	Little Bear	**Dora the Explorer**	Blue's Clues	**Little Bill**	The Saturday Early Show				Franklin	**Kipper**	CBS Sports and/or local programming						CBS Sports programming						Local news	CBS Evening News
NBC	Fall	Local and/or syndicated programming		Today				Hang Time	One World	City Guys	**Just Deal**	City Guys	NBA Inside Stuff	NBC Sports and/or local programming				NBC Sports programming						Local news	NBC Nightly News
NBC	Spring	Local and/or syndicated programming		Today				Hang Time	City Guys	Just Deal	One World	City Guys	NBA Inside Stuff	NBC Sports and/or local programming				NBC Sports programming						Local news	NBC Nightly News
NBC	August	Local and/or syndicated programming		Today				City Guys	**All About Us**	Just Deal	One World	City Guys	NBA Inside Stuff	NBC Sports and/or local programming				NBC Sports programming						Local news	NBC Nightly News
Fox	Fall	Local and/or syndicated programming		Power Rangers Lightspeed Rescue	Cybersix	Digimon: Digital Monsters	Action Man	Beast Machines: Transformers	Digimon: Digital Monsters	Escaflowne	Dinozaurs	Fox Sports and/or local programming													
Fox	October	Local and/or syndicated programming		Power Rangers Lightspeed Rescue	Action Man	Digimon: Digital Monsters	Digimon: Digital Monsters	Beast Machines: Transformers	Digimon: Digital Monsters	NASCAR Racers	Cybersix (Oct. 21–Nov. 4); **Real Scary Stories** (Nov. 11–18)	Fox Sports and/or local programming													
Fox	December	Local and/or syndicated programming		Power Rangers Lightspeed Rescue	Action Man	Digimon: Digital Monsters	Digimon: Digital Monsters	Beast Machines: Transformers	Digimon: Digital Monsters	Spider-Man Unlimited	NASCAR Racers	Fox Sports and/or local programming													
Fox	February	Local and/or syndicated programming		**Power Rangers Time Force**	Digimon: Digital Monsters	Digimon: Digital Monsters	**Los Luchadores**	**The Zack Files**	Digimon: Digital Monsters	Spider-Man Unlimited	NASCAR Racers	Fox Sports and/or local programming													
Fox	April	Local and/or syndicated programming		**Power Rangers Time Force**	Spider-Man Unlimited	Digimon: Digital Monsters	**Los Luchadores**	Big Guy and Rusty the Boy Robot	Digimon: Digital Monsters	Power Rangers Time Force	**Roswell Conspiracies**	Fox Sports and/or local programming													
Fox	May	Local and/or syndicated programming		Los Luchadores	Power Rangers Time Force	Big Guy and Rusty the Boy Robot	Digimon: Digital Monsters	Spider-Man	Digimon: Digital Monsters	Power Rangers Time Force	**Kong: The Animated Series**	Local and/or syndicated programming	**This Week in Baseball**	Fox Sports and/or local programming											
The WB	Fall	Local and/or syndicated programming		Men in Black: The Series	Pokémon	**Jackie Chan Adventures**	Cardcaptors	Pokémon	**Static Shock**	Batman Beyond	Max Steel	Local and/or syndicated programming													
The WB	November	Local and/or syndicated programming		Batman Beyond	Pokémon	**Jackie Chan Adventures**	Cardcaptors	Pokémon	**X-Men: Evolution**	Static Shock	Max Steel	Local and/or syndicated programming													
The WB	January	Local and/or syndicated programming		Max Steel	Pokémon	**Jackie Chan Adventures**	X-Men: Evolution	Pokémon	**The Zeta Project**	Static Shock	Batman Beyond	Local and/or syndicated programming													
The WB	April	Local and/or syndicated programming		Max Steel	Pokémon	**Jackie Chan Adventures**	X-Men: Evolution	Pokémon	**The Zeta Project**	Static Shock	Men in Black: The Series	Local and/or syndicated programming													
The WB	June	Local and/or syndicated programming		Pokémon	Cardcaptors	**Jackie Chan Adventures**	X-Men: Evolution	Pokémon	**The Zeta Project**	Men in Black: The Series	Max Steel	Local and/or syndicated programming													
The WB	July	Local and/or syndicated programming		Pokémon	Cardcaptors	**Jackie Chan Adventures**	X-Men: Evolution	Pokémon	Cardcaptors **Cubix: Robots for Everyone** (starting Aug. 11)	**Rescue Heroes: Global Response Team**	The Zeta Project	Local and/or syndicated programming													

=== Sunday ===
Network		7:00 am	7:30 am	8:00 am	8:30 am	9:00 am	9:30 am	10:00 am	10:30 am	11:00 am	11:30 am	noon	12:30 pm	1:00 pm	1:30 pm	2:00 pm	2:30 pm	3:00 pm	3:30 pm	4:00 pm	4:30 pm	5:00 pm	5:30 pm	6:00 pm	6:30 pm
ABC		Local and/or syndicated programming						This Week with Sam & Cokie		ABC Sports and/or local programming														Local news	ABC World News Sunday
CBS	Fall	Local and/or syndicated programming				CBS News Sunday Morning			Face the Nation	Local and/or syndicated programming		NFL Today		NFL on CBS											
CBS	Mid-winter	Local and/or syndicated programming				CBS News Sunday Morning			Face the Nation	Local and/or syndicated programming		CBS Sports and/or local programming												Local news	CBS Evening News
NBC		Local and/or syndicated programming		Today		Meet the Press		Local and/or syndicated programming				NBC Sports and/or local programming												Local news	NBC Nightly News
Fox	Fall	Local and/or syndicated programming				Fox News Sunday		Local and/or syndicated programming				Fox NFL Sunday		Fox NFL (and sometimes another Fox Sports event and/or local programming)											
Fox	Mid-winter	Local and/or syndicated programming				Fox News Sunday		Local and/or syndicated programming				Fox Sports and/or local programming												Local and/or syndicated programming	
UPN		Pepper Ann	Sabrina: The Animated Series	Recess	**Buzz Lightyear of Star Command**	Local and/or syndicated programming																			

== By network ==
=== ABC ===
Returning series:

- ABC World News Tonight with Peter Jennings
- All My Children
- Disney's One Saturday Morning
  - Doug (reruns)
  - Mickey Mouse Works
  - The New Adventures of Winnie the Pooh (reruns)
  - Pepper Ann
  - Recess
  - Sabrina: The Animated Series
  - The Weekenders
- General Hospital
- Good Morning America
- One Life to Live
- Port Charles
- This Week with Sam & Cokie
- The View

New series:

- Disney's One Saturday Morning
  - **Buzz Lightyear of Star Command**
  - **House of Mouse**
  - **Lloyd in Space**
  - **Teacher's Pet**

Not returning from 1999-2000:

- Disney's One Saturday Morning
  - The Bugs Bunny and Tweety Show
  - Schoolhouse Rock!
  - Squigglevision

=== CBS ===
Returning series:

- As the World Turns
- The Bold and the Beautiful
- The Early Show
- CBS Evening News with Dan Rather
- CBS News Sunday Morning
- Face the Nation
- Franklin
- Guiding Light
- The Price is Right
- The Saturday Early Show
- The Young and the Restless

New series:

- **Nick Jr. on CBS**
  - **Blue's Clues**
  - **Dora the Explorer**
  - **Kipper**
  - **Little Bear**
  - **Little Bill**

Not returning from 1999-2000:

- Anatole
- Blaster's Universe
- Flying Rhino Junior High
- Mythic Warriors
- New Tales from the Cryptkeeper
- Rescue Heroes (moved to Kids WB)

=== NBC ===
Returning series:

- Days of Our Lives
- Meet the Press
- NBC Nightly News with Tom Brokaw
- Passions
- Today with Katie Couric and Matt Lauer
- TNBC
  - City Guys
  - Hang Time
  - One World
  - NBA Inside Stuff

New series:

- TNBC
  - **All About Us**
  - **Just Deal**

Not returning from 1999–2000:

- Later Today
- Sunset Beach
- TNBC
  - Saved by the Bell: The New Class

=== Fox ===
Returning series:

- Fox Kids
  - Action Man
  - Beast Machines: Transformers
  - Big Guy and Rusty the Boy Robot
  - Cybersix
  - Digimon: Digital Monsters
  - Dinozaurs
  - Dungeons & Dragons
  - Escaflowne
  - Flint the Time Detective
  - The Magic School Bus (reruns)
  - NASCAR Racers
  - Power Rangers Lightspeed Rescue
  - Spider-Man Unlimited
  - X-Men (reruns)
- Fox News Sunday

New series:

- Fox Kids
  - **Kong: The Animated Series**
  - **Los Luchadores**
  - **Power Rangers Time Force**
  - **Real Scary Stories**
  - **Roswell Conspiracies**
  - **This Week in Baseball**
  - **The Zack Files**

Not returning from 1999–2000:

- Fox Kids
  - Beast Wars: Transformers
  - In the Zone
  - Power Rangers Lost Galaxy
  - Power Rangers Power Playback
  - Sherlock Holmes in the 22nd Century
  - The New Woody Woodpecker Show

=== UPN ===
Returning series:

- Disney's One Too
  - Recess
  - Sabrina: The Animated Series
  - Pepper Ann

New series:

- Disney's One Too
  - **Buzz Lightyear of Star Command**

Not returning from 1999–2000:

- Disney's One Too
  - Disney's Doug
  - Hercules

=== The WB ===
Returning series:

- Kids WB!
  - Batman Beyond
  - Cardcaptors
  - Detention
  - Histeria!
  - Max Steel
  - Men in Black: The Series
  - Pokémon
  - The Sylvester & Tweety Mysteries

New series:

- Kids WB!
  - **Cubix: Robots for Everyone**
  - **Generation O!**
  - **Jackie Chan Adventures**
  - **Pokémon: The Johto Journeys**
  - **Rescue Heroes: Global Response Team**
  - **Static Shock**
  - **X-Men: Evolution**
  - **The Zeta Project**

Not returning from 1999–2000:

- Kids WB!
  - The Big Cartoonie Show
  - The New Batman/Superman Adventures

== See also ==
- 2000–01 United States network television schedule (prime-time)
- 2000–01 United States network television schedule (late night)

== Sources ==
- Curt Alliaume. "ABC Daytime Schedule". Curt Alliaume’s Utterly Irrelevant Web Site. Archived from the original on October 15, 2007.
- Curt Alliaume. "CBS Daytime Schedule". Curt Alliaume’s Utterly Irrelevant Web Site. Archived from the original on October 15, 2007.
- Curt Alliaume. "NBC Daytime Schedule". Curt Alliaume’s Utterly Irrelevant Web Site. Archived from the original on October 12, 2007.
- "Fox Kids Weekday Lineups (2000-2002)". The Kids Block Blog. October 25, 2012.
- Aaron Greenhouse (October 11, 2000). "Kids WB! Schedule". Carnegie Mellon University.
- Aaron Greenhouse (October 16, 2001). "UPN Kids Broadcast Schedule". Carnegie Mellon University.
