= 1999–2000 United States network television schedule (daytime) =

The following is the 1999–2000 daytime network television schedule for the six major English-language commercial broadcast networks in the United States in operation during that television season. It covers the weekday daytime hours from September 1999 to August 2000. The schedule is followed by a list per network of returning series, new series, and series canceled after the 1998–99 season.

Affiliates fill time periods not occupied by network programs with local or syndicated programming. PBS – which offers daytime programming through a children's program block, which the service rebranded as PBS Kids on September 6 – is not included, as its member television stations have local flexibility over most of their schedules and broadcast times for network shows may vary. Also not included are stations affiliated with Pax TV; although Pax carried a limited schedule of first-run programs, its schedule otherwise was composed mainly of syndicated reruns.

== Legend ==
- Light yellow indicates talk shows.
- Green indicates soap operas.
- Pink indicates game shows.
- Gold indicates news programming.
- White indicates local programming.
- Gray indicates encore programming (e.g., reruns of prime-time programming).
- Light teal indicates sporting events.
- Light purple indicates children's programming.

== Schedule ==
- New series are highlighted in **bold**.
- All times correspond to U.S. Eastern and Pacific Time scheduling (except for some live sports or events). Except where affiliates slot certain programs outside their network-dictated timeslots, subtract one hour for Central, Mountain, Alaska, and Hawaii-Aleutian times.
- Local schedules may differ, as affiliates have the option to pre-empt or delay network programs. Such scheduling may be limited to preemptions caused by local or national breaking news or weather coverage (which may force stations to tape delay certain programs in overnight timeslots or defer them to a co-operated or other contracted station in their regular timeslot) and any major sports events scheduled to air in a weekday timeslot (mainly during major holidays). Stations may air shows at other times at their preference.

=== Monday-Friday ===
| Network | | 7:00 am | 7:30 am | 8:00 am | 8:30 am | 9:00 am | 9:30 am | 10:00 am | 10:30 am | 11:00 am | 11:30 am | noon | 12:30 pm | 1:00 pm | 1:30 pm | 2:00 pm | 2:30 pm | 3:00 pm | 3:30 pm | 4:00 pm | 4:30 pm | 5:00 pm | 5:30 pm | 6:00 pm | 6:30 pm |
|---|---|---|---|---|---|---|---|---|---|---|---|---|---|---|---|---|---|---|---|---|---|---|---|---|---|
| ABC | | Good Morning America | | | | Local and/or syndicated programming | | | | The View | | Local and/or syndicated programming | Port Charles | All My Children | | One Life to Live | | General Hospital | | Local and/or syndicated programming | | | | | ABC World News Tonight with Peter Jennings |
| CBS | Fall | CBS This Morning | | | | Local and/or syndicated programming | | | | The Price Is Right | | Local and/or syndicated programming | The Young and the Restless | | The Bold and the Beautiful | As the World Turns | | Guiding Light | | Local and/or syndicated programming | | | | | CBS Evening News with Dan Rather |
| CBS | November | **The Early Show with Bryant Gumbel and Jane Clayson** | | | | Local and/or syndicated programming | | | | The Price Is Right | | Local and/or syndicated programming | The Young and the Restless | | The Bold and the Beautiful | As the World Turns | | Guiding Light | | Local and/or syndicated programming | | | | | CBS Evening News with Dan Rather |
| NBC | Fall | Today with Katie Couric and Matt Lauer | | | | **Later Today** | | Local and/or syndicated programming | | | | Sunset Beach | | Days of Our Lives | | Passions | | Local and/or syndicated programming | | | | | | | NBC Nightly News with Tom Brokaw |
| NBC | Winter | Today with Katie Couric and Matt Lauer | | | | **Later Today** | | Local and/or syndicated programming | | | | | | Days of Our Lives | | Passions | | Local and/or syndicated programming | | | | | | | NBC Nightly News with Tom Brokaw |
| Fox | Fall | The Magic School Bus | Local and/or syndicated programming | | | | | | | | | | | | | | | Power Rangers Power Playback | **Beast Wars: Transformers** | Digimon: Digital Monsters | The New Woody Woodpecker Show | Local and/or syndicated programming | | | |
| Fox | October | The Magic School Bus | Local and/or syndicated programming | | | | | | | | | | | | | | | Power Rangers Power Playback | **Beast Wars: Transformers** | Digimon: Digital Monsters | Power Rangers Lost Galaxy | Local and/or syndicated programming | | | |
| Fox | November | The Magic School Bus | Local and/or syndicated programming | | | | | | | | | | | | | | | **Monster Rancher** | Power Rangers Lost Galaxy | Sherlock Holmes in the 22nd Century (Mon.); Beast Wars: Transformers (Tue.-Fri.) | Digimon: Digital Monsters | Local and/or syndicated programming | | | |
| Fox | January | The Magic School Bus | Local and/or syndicated programming | | | | | | | | | | | | | | | The Magic School Bus | Power Rangers Lost Galaxy | Sherlock Holmes in the 22nd Century (Mon.); Beast Wars: Transformers (Tue.-Fri.) | Digimon: Digital Monsters | Local and/or syndicated programming | | | |
| Fox | Summer | The Magic School Bus | Local and/or syndicated programming | | | | | | | | | | | | | | | The Magic School Bus (Mon.-Thu.); Digimon: Digital Monsters (Fri.) | Power Rangers Lost Galaxy (Mon.-Thu.); Flint the Time Detective (Fri.) | Beast Wars: Transformers (Mon.-Wed.); Beast Machines: Transformers (Thu.); Monster Rancher (Fri.) | Digimon: Digital Monsters | Local and/or syndicated programming | | | |
| Fox | August | The Magic School Bus | Local and/or syndicated programming | | | | | | | | | | | | | | | The Magic School Bus (Mon.-Thu.); Flint the Time Detective (Fri.) | X-Men (Mon.-Thu.); **Dinozaurs** (Fri.) | Beast Machines: Transformers Mon.-Thu. Monster Rancher (Fri.) | Digimon: Digital Monsters | Local and/or syndicated programming | | | |
| The WB | Fall | Pokémon | Histeria! | Local and/or syndicated programming | | | | | | | | | | | | | | The Big Cartoonie Show | Pokémon | Batman Beyond | Pokémon (Mon.-Thu.); Batman Beyond (Fri.) | Local and/or syndicated programming | | | |
| The WB | Winter | Pokémon | Histeria! | Local and/or syndicated programming | | | | | | | | | | | | | | The Big Cartoonie Show | The New Batman/Superman Adventures | Pokémon | Batman Beyond (Mon./Wed./Fri.); Men in Black: The Series (Tue./Thu.) | Local and/or syndicated programming | | | |
| The WB | Spring | Pokémon | Histeria! | Local and/or syndicated programming | | | | | | | | | | | | | | The Big Cartoonie Show | The New Batman/Superman Adventures | Pokémon | Batman Beyond (Mon./Fri.); The New Batman/Superman Adventures (Tue.-Thu.) | Local and/or syndicated programming | | | |
| The WB | Summer | Pokémon | Histeria! | Local and/or syndicated programming | | | | | | | | | | | | | | The Big Cartoonie Show | The New Batman/Superman Adventures | Pokémon | Batman Beyond (Mon./Wed./Fri.); The New Batman/Superman Adventures (Tue./Thu.) | Local and/or syndicated programming | | | |
UPN
| UPN | Fall | Recess | Sabrina: The Animated Series | Doug | Hercules | Local and/or syndicated programming | | | | | | | | | | | | | | | | | | | |
| UPN | November | Recess | Sabrina: The Animated Series | Recess | Doug | Local and/or syndicated programming | | | | | | | | | | | | | | | | | | | |
| UPN | February | Doug | Sabrina: The Animated Series | Pepper Ann | Recess | Local and/or syndicated programming | | | | | | | | | | | | | | | | | | | |

Notes:

- ABC, NBC and CBS offer their early morning newscasts via a looping feed (usually running as late as 10:00 a.m. Pacific Time) to accommodate local scheduling in the westernmost contiguous time zones or for use a filler programming for stations that do not offer a local morning newscast; some stations without a morning newscast may air syndicated or time-lease programs instead of the full newscast loop.
- NBC allowed owned-and-operated and affiliated stations the preference of airing Passions and Days of Our Lives in reverse order from the network's recommended scheduling, a structure held over from when Another World occupied the 2:00 p.m. ET timeslot prior to its discontinuance in July 1999.
- Sunset Beach aired its final episode on December 31, 1999; NBC returned the noon timeslot to its affiliates on January 3, 2000. Some NBC affiliates did not air Sunset Beach in the noon timeslot, opting to air local news and/or syndicated programming instead.
- UPN debuted a weekly Disney cartoon block called Disney's One Too. It debuted on Monday, September 6, 1999 (just a day after UPN Kids aired its final broadcast). UPN airs Disney animated series from Disney's One Saturday Morning on ABC, except it airs Monday through Friday and Sunday mornings.

=== Saturday ===
| Network | | 7:00 am | 7:30 am | 8:00 am | 8:30 am | 9:00 am | 9:30 am | 10:00 am | 10:30 am | 11:00 am | 11:30 am | noon | 12:30 pm | 1:00 pm | 1:30 pm | 2:00 pm | 2:30 pm | 3:00 pm | 3:30 pm | 4:00 pm | 4:30 pm | 5:00 pm | 5:30 pm | 6:00 pm | 6:30 pm |
|---|---|---|---|---|---|---|---|---|---|---|---|---|---|---|---|---|---|---|---|---|---|---|---|---|---|
| ABC | Fall | Local and/or syndicated programming | | Pepper Ann | Disney's One Saturday Morning (featuring Doug, Recess, and Pepper Ann) | | | | **Sabrina: The Animated Series** | The Bugs Bunny and Tweety Show / Schoolhouse Rock! (11:26AM) | The New Adventures of Winnie the Pooh | Mickey Mouse Works | Squigglevision | College Football on ABC | | | | | | | | | | | |
| ABC | December | Local and/or syndicated programming | | Pepper Ann | Disney's One Saturday Morning (featuring Doug, Recess, and Pepper Ann) | | | | **Sabrina: The Animated Series** | The Bugs Bunny and Tweety Show / Schoolhouse Rock! (11:26AM) | The New Adventures of Winnie the Pooh | Mickey Mouse Works | Squigglevision | ABC Sports and/or local programming | | | | ABC Sports programming | | | | | | Local news | ABC World News Saturday |
| ABC | March | Local and/or syndicated programming | | Pepper Ann | Disney's One Saturday Morning (featuring Doug, Recess, and **The Weekenders**) | | | | **Sabrina: The Animated Series** | The Bugs Bunny and Tweety Show / Schoolhouse Rock! (11:26AM) | The New Adventures of Winnie the Pooh | Mickey Mouse Works | Squigglevision | ABC Sports and/or local programming | | | | ABC Sports programming | | | | | | Local news | ABC World News Saturday |
| ABC | Summer | Local and/or syndicated programming | | Recess | Disney's One Saturday Morning (featuring Doug, Recess, and **The Weekenders**) | | | | **Sabrina: The Animated Series** | The Bugs Bunny and Tweety Show / Schoolhouse Rock! (11:26AM) | The New Adventures of Winnie the Pooh | Mickey Mouse Works | Squigglevision | ABC Sports and/or local programming | | | | ABC Sports programming | | | | | | Local news | ABC World News Saturday |
| CBS | Fall | Anatole | **Blaster's Universe** | **Rescue Heroes** | Flying Rhino Junior High | CBS News Saturday Morning | | | | **New Tales from the Cryptkeeper** | Mythic Warriors | SEC on CBS | | | | | | | | | | | | | |
| CBS | Winter | Anatole | **Blaster's Universe** | **Rescue Heroes** | Flying Rhino Junior High | **The Saturday Early Show** | | | | **New Tales from the Cryptkeeper** | Mythic Warriors | CBS Sports and/or local programming | | | | | | CBS Sports programming | | | | | | Local news | CBS Evening News |
| NBC | | Local and/or syndicated programming | | Today | | | | Saved by the Bell: The New Class | Hang Time | City Guys | One World | City Guys | NBA Inside Stuff | NBC Sports and/or local programming | | | | NBC Sports programming | | | | | | Local news | NBC Nightly News |
| Fox | Fall | Local and/or syndicated programming | | **Sherlock Holmes in the 22nd Century** | Godzilla: The Series | Digimon: Digital Monsters | **Xyber 9: New Dawn** | **Spider-Man Unlimited** | Digimon: Digital Monsters | **Beast Machines: Transformers** | **Big Guy and Rusty the Boy Robot** | Fox Sports and/or local programming | | | | | | | | | | | | | |
| Fox | December | Local and/or syndicated programming | | Power Rangers Lost Galaxy | **Monster Rancher** (starting Oct. 16) | Digimon: Digital Monsters | Godzilla: The Series | **Monster Rancher** (starting Oct. 23) | Digimon: Digital Monsters | **Beast Machines: Transformers** | **The Avengers: United They Stand** (starting Oct. 30) | Fox Sports and/or local programming | | | | | | | | | | | | | |
| Fox | February | Local and/or syndicated programming | | **Power Rangers Lightspeed Rescue** | **Monster Rancher** (starting Oct. 16) | Digimon: Digital Monsters | **NASCAR Racers** | Godzilla: The Series | Digimon: Digital Monsters | **Beast Machines: Transformers** | **The Avengers: United They Stand** (starting Oct. 30) | Fox Sports and/or local programming | | | | | | | | | | | | | |
| Fox | April | Local and/or syndicated programming | | **Power Rangers Lightspeed Rescue** | **Monster Rancher** (starting Oct. 16) | Digimon: Digital Monsters | **NASCAR Racers** | Beast Machines: Transformers | Digimon: Digital Monsters | **Flint the Time Detective** | Godzilla: The Series | Fox Sports and/or local programming | | | | | | | | | | | | | |
| Fox | late-April | Local and/or syndicated programming | | **Power Rangers Lightspeed Rescue** | **Monster Rancher** (starting Oct. 16) | Digimon: Digital Monsters | **NASCAR Racers** | Beast Machines: Transformers | Digimon: Digital Monsters | Dungeons & Dragons | Flint the Time Detective | Fox Sports and/or local programming | | | | | | | | | | | | | |
| Fox | Summer | Local and/or syndicated programming | | **Action Man** | **Cybersix** | Monster Rancher | Flint the Time Detective | **Escaflowne** | **Dinozaurs** | **Angela Anaconda** | Dungeons & Dragons | Local and/or syndicated programming | In the Zone | Fox Sports and/or local programming | | | | | | | | | | | |
| The WB | Fall | Local and/or syndicated programming | | The New Batman/Superman Adventures | Pokémon | Batman Beyond | Men in Black: The Series | Pokémon | **Detention** | The Big Cartoonie Show | The Sylvester & Tweety Mysteries | Local and/or syndicated programming | | | | | | | | | | | | | |
| The WB | November | Local and/or syndicated programming | | The New Batman/Superman Adventures | Pokémon | Batman Beyond | Men in Black: The Series | Pokémon | Men in Black: The Series | Detention | The Sylvester & Tweety Mysteries | Local and/or syndicated programming | | | | | | | | | | | | | |
| The WB | March | Local and/or syndicated programming | | The New Batman/Superman Adventures | Pokémon | Pokémon | **Max Steel** | Pokémon | Batman Beyond | Men in Black: The Series | Detention | Local and/or syndicated programming | | | | | | | | | | | | | |
| The WB | May | Local and/or syndicated programming | | Batman Beyond | Batman Beyond | Pokémon | **Max Steel** | Pokémon | Pokémon | Men in Black: The Series | Detention | Local and/or syndicated programming | | | | | | | | | | | | | |
| The WB | June | Local and/or syndicated programming | | The New Batman/Superman Adventures | Batman Beyond | Pokémon | **Cardcaptors** | Pokémon | Various | Men in Black: The Series | Detention | Local and/or syndicated programming | | | | | | | | | | | | | |

=== Sunday ===
| Network | | 7:00 am | 7:30 am | 8:00 am | 8:30 am | 9:00 am | 9:30 am | 10:00 am | 10:30 am | 11:00 am | 11:30 am | noon | 12:30 pm | 1:00 pm | 1:30 pm | 2:00 pm | 2:30 pm | 3:00 pm | 3:30 pm | 4:00 pm | 4:30 pm | 5:00 pm | 5:30 pm | 6:00 pm | 6:30 pm |
|---|---|---|---|---|---|---|---|---|---|---|---|---|---|---|---|---|---|---|---|---|---|---|---|---|---|
| ABC | | Local and/or syndicated programming | | | | | | This Week with Sam & Cokie | | ABC Sports and/or local programming | | | | | | | | | | | | | | Local news | ABC World News Sunday |
| CBS | Fall | Local and/or syndicated programming | | | | CBS News Sunday Morning | | | Face the Nation | Local and/or syndicated programming | | NFL Today | | NFL on CBS | | | | | | | | | | | |
| CBS | Mid-winter | Local and/or syndicated programming | | | | CBS News Sunday Morning | | | Face the Nation | Local and/or syndicated programming | | CBS Sports and/or local programming | | | | | | | | | | | | Local news | CBS Evening News |
| NBC | | Local and/or syndicated programming | | Today | | Meet the Press | | Local and/or syndicated programming | | | | NBC Sports and/or local programming | | | | | | | | | | | | Local news | NBC Nightly News |
| Fox | Fall | Local and/or syndicated programming | | | | Fox News Sunday | | Local and/or syndicated programming | | | | Fox NFL Sunday | | Fox NFL (and sometimes another Fox Sports event and/or local programming) | | | | | | | | | | | |
| Fox | Mid-winter | Local and/or syndicated programming | | | | Fox News Sunday | | Local and/or syndicated programming | | | | Fox Sports and/or local programming | | | | | | | | | | | | Local and/or syndicated programming | |
UPN
| UPN | Fall | **Hercules** | **Doug** | **Sabrina: The Animated Series** | **Recess** | Local and/or syndicated programming | | | | | | | | | | | | | | | | | | | |
| UPN | November | Doug | Recess | **Sabrina: The Animated Series** | **Recess** | Local and/or syndicated programming | | | | | | | | | | | | | | | | | | | |
| UPN | February | Doug | Sabrina: The Animated Series | **Pepper Ann** | **Recess** | Local and/or syndicated programming | | | | | | | | | | | | | | | | | | | |

== By network ==
=== ABC ===
Returning series:

- ABC World News This Morning
- ABC World News Tonight
- All My Children
- Disney's One Saturday Morning
  - The Bugs Bunny and Tweety Show
  - Doug
  - Mickey Mouse Works
  - The New Adventures of Winnie the Pooh (reruns)
  - Recess
  - Pepper Ann
  - Schoolhouse Rock! (reruns)
  - Squigglevision
- General Hospital
- Good Morning America
- One Life to Live
- Port Charles
- The View

New series:

- Disney's One Saturday Morning
  - Sabrina: The Animated Series
  - The Weekenders

Not returning from 1998–99:

- Disney's One Saturday Morning
  - 101 Dalmatians: The Series (reruns)
  - Hercules
- Good Morning America Sunday (returned in 2004)

=== CBS ===
Returning series:

- Anatole
- As the World Turns
- The Bold and the Beautiful
- CBS Evening News
- CBS Morning News
- CBS This Morning
- CBS News Saturday Morning
- CBS News Sunday Morning
- Face the Nation
- Flying Rhino Junior High
- Guiding Light
- Mythic Warriors
- The Price Is Right
- The Young and the Restless

New series:

- Blaster's Universe
- The Early Show
- New Tales from the Cryptkeeper
- Rescue Heroes
- The Saturday Early Show

Not returning from 1998–99:

- Birdz
- Dumb Bunnies
- Franklin (moved to Nick Jr.)
- Rupert (reruns)
- Tales from the Cryptkeeper (reruns)

=== NBC ===
Returning series:

- Days of Our Lives
- NBC Nightly News
- Passions
- Sunset Beach
- Today
- TNBC
  - City Guys
  - Hang Time
  - NBA Inside Stuff
  - One World
  - Saved by the Bell: The New Class

New series:

- Early Today
- Later Today

Not returning from 1998–99:

- Another World
- NBC News at Sunrise

=== Fox ===
Returning series:

- Fox Kids
  - Digimon: Digital Monsters
  - Godzilla: The Series
  - The Magic School Bus (reruns)
  - Power Rangers Lost Galaxy
  - Power Rangers Power Playback
  - The New Woody Woodpecker Show (reruns)
  - X-Men (reruns) (moved from UPN)
- Fox News Sunday
- In the Zone

New series:

- Fox Kids
  - Action Man
  - Angela Anaconda
  - The Avengers: United They Stand
  - Beast Machines: Transformers
  - Beast Wars: Transformers
  - Big Guy and Rusty the Boy Robot
  - Cybersix
  - Dinozaurs
  - Escaflowne
  - Dungeons & Dragons (reruns)
  - Flint the Time Detective
  - Monster Rancher
  - NASCAR Racers
  - Power Rangers Lightspeed Rescue
  - Sherlock Holmes in the 22nd Century
  - Spider-Man Unlimited
  - Xyber 9: New Dawn

Not returning from 1998–99:

- Fox Kids
  - Bobby's World (reruns)
  - Cartoon Cabana
  - Donkey Kong Country
  - Goosebumps
  - Life with Louie
  - Mad Jack the Pirate
  - The Magician
  - The Mr. Potato Head Show
  - Mystic Knights of Tir Na Nog
  - Ned's Newt
  - The New Addams Family
  - Oggy and the Cockroaches
  - Power Rangers in Space
  - The Secret Files of the Spy Dogs
  - Space Goofs
  - Spider-Man
  - Toonsylvania
  - Young Hercules

=== UPN ===
New series:

- Disney's One Too
  - Doug
  - Hercules
  - Pepper Ann
  - Recess
  - Sabrina: The Animated Series

Not returning from 1998–99:

- Algo's FACTory
- Beetleborgs (reruns)
- Incredible Hulk and Friends (reruns of The Incredible Hulk, Fantastic Four and Iron Man)
- X-Men (reruns) (moved back to FOX)
- Spider-Man (reruns)

=== The WB ===
Returning series:

- Kids WB!
  - Batman Beyond
  - The Big Cartoonie Show
  - Histeria!
  - Men in Black
  - The New Batman/Superman Adventures
  - Pokémon
  - The Sylvester & Tweety Mysteries

New series:

- Kids WB!
  - Cardcaptors
  - Detention
  - Max Steel

Not returning from 1998–99:

- Kids WB!
  - Animaniacs
  - Brats of the Lost Nebula
  - Invasion America
  - Pinky and the Brain
  - Pinky, Elmyra & the Brain
  - Tiny Toon Adventures

== See also ==
- 1999–2000 United States network television schedule (prime-time)
- 1999–2000 United States network television schedule (late night)

== Sources ==
- Curt Alliaume. "ABC Daytime Schedule". Curt Alliaume’s Utterly Irrelevant Web Site. Archived from the original on October 15, 2007.
- Curt Alliaume. "CBS Daytime Schedule". Curt Alliaume’s Utterly Irrelevant Web Site. Archived from the original on October 15, 2007.
- Curt Alliaume. "NBC Daytime Schedule". Curt Alliaume’s Utterly Irrelevant Web Site. Archived from the original on October 12, 2007.
- "Fox Kids Weekday Lineups (1999-2000)". The Kids Block Blog. October 25, 2012.
- Aaron Greenhouse (October 11, 2000). "Kids WB! Schedule". Carnegie Mellon University.
- Aaron Greenhouse (October 16, 2001). "UPN Kids Broadcast Schedule". Carnegie Mellon University.
