= 1997–98 United States network television schedule (daytime) =

The following is the 1997–98 daytime network television schedule for the six major English-language commercial broadcast networks in the United States. It covers the weekday and weekend daytime hours from September 1997 to August 1998. The schedule is followed by a list per network of returning series, new series, and series canceled after the 1996–97 season.

Affiliates fill time periods not occupied by network programs with local or syndicated programming. PBS – which offers daytime programming through a children's program block, branded as PTV at the time – is not included, as its member television stations have local flexibility over most of their schedules and broadcast times for network shows may vary.

== Legend ==
- Light yellow indicates talk shows.
- Green indicates soap operas.
- Pink indicates game shows.
- Gold indicates news and public affairs programming.
- Light teal indicates sporting events.
- White indicates local programming.
- Light purple indicates children's and/or E/I-compliant programming.
- Gray indicates encore programming (e.g., reruns of prime-time programming).
- White with red border indicates other programs not applicable to the above categorizations.
- New series are highlighted in **bold**.

== Schedule ==
- All times correspond to U.S. Eastern and Pacific Time scheduling (except for some live sports or events). Except where affiliates slot certain programs outside their network-dictated timeslots, subtract one hour for Central, Mountain, Alaska, and Hawaii-Aleutian times.
- Local schedules may differ, as affiliates have the option to pre-empt or delay network programs. Such scheduling may be limited to preemptions caused by local or national breaking news or weather coverage (which may force stations to tape delay certain programs in overnight timeslots or defer them to a co-operated or contracted station in their regular timeslot) and any major sports events scheduled to air in a weekday timeslot (mainly during major holidays). Stations may air shows at other times at their preference.

=== Monday–Friday ===
| Network | | 6:00 am | 6:30 am | 7:00 am | 7:30 am | 8:00 am | 8:30 am | 9:00 am | 9:30 am | 10:00 am | 10:30 am | 11:00 am | 11:30 am | noon | 12:30 pm | 1:00 pm | 1:30 pm | 2:00 pm | 2:30 pm | 3:00 pm | 3:30 pm | 4:00 pm | 4:30 pm | 5:00 pm | 5:30 pm | 6:00 pm | 6:30 pm |
|---|---|---|---|---|---|---|---|---|---|---|---|---|---|---|---|---|---|---|---|---|---|---|---|---|---|---|---|
| ABC | | ABC World News This Morning | | Good Morning America | | | | Local/syndicated programming | | | | The View | | Local/syndicated programming | Port Charles | All My Children | | One Life to Live | | General Hospital | | Local/syndicated programming | | | | | ABC World News Tonight with Peter Jennings |
| CBS | | CBS Morning News | | CBS This Morning | | | | Local/syndicated programming | | | | The Price Is Right | | Local/syndicated programming | The Young and the Restless | | The Bold and the Beautiful | As the World Turns | | Guiding Light | | Local/syndicated programming | | | | | CBS Evening News with Dan Rather |
| NBC | | NBC News at Sunrise | | Today | | | | Local/syndicated programming | | | | Leeza | | Sunset Beach | | Days of Our Lives | | Another World | | Local/syndicated programming | | | | | | | NBC Nightly News with Tom Brokaw |
| Fox | Fall | Local/syndicated programming | | Bobby's World (Mon.-Thu.); C Bear and Jamal (Fri.) | The Spooktacular New Adventures of Casper | Local/syndicated programming | | | | | | | | | | | | | | Spider-Man | **Beetleborgs Metallix** | Power Rangers Turbo | Goosebumps (Mon.-Thu.); **Ninja Turtles: The Next Mutation** (Fri.) | Local/syndicated programming | | | |
| Fox | February | Local/syndicated programming | | Bobby's World (Mon.-Thu.); C Bear and Jamal (Fri.) | Bobby's World (Mon.-Thu.); The Spooktacular New Adventures of Casper (Fri.) | Local/syndicated programming | | | | | | | | | | | | | | Beetleborgs Metallix (Mon.-Thu.); The Spooktacular New Adventures of Casper (Fri.) | Spider-Man (Mon.-Thu.); The Adventures of Sam & Max: Freelance Police (Fri.) | Power Rangers Turbo (Mon.-Thu.); **Power Rangers in Space** (Fri.) | Life with Louie (Mon.-Thu.) / Where on Earth is Carmen Sandiego? (Mon.-Wed., from Mar. 30-Apr. 1); Ninja Turtles: The Next Mutation (Fri.) | Local/syndicated programming | | | |
| Fox | April | Local/syndicated programming | | Bobby's World | Life with Louie | Local/syndicated programming | | | | | | | | | | | | | | Beetleborgs Metallix | Spider-Man | Ninja Turtles: The Next Mutation | Power Rangers Turbo (Mon.-Thu.); Power Rangers in Space (Fri.) | Local/syndicated programming | | | |
| Fox | July | Local/syndicated programming | | Beetleborgs Metallix (Mon.-Thu.); Bobby's World (Fri.) | Life with Louie | Local/syndicated programming | | | | | | | | | | | | | | **Cartoon Cabana** | | Spider-Man | Power Rangers Power Playback (Mon.-Thu.); Power Rangers in Space (Fri.) | Local/syndicated programming | | | |
| The WB | Fall | Local/syndicated programming | | Tiny Toon Adventures (reruns) | Captain Planet and the Planeteers (reruns) | Local/syndicated programming | | | | | | | | | | | | | | Bugs 'n' Daffy | Animaniacs | Pinky and the Brain | **The New Batman/Superman Adventures** | Local/syndicated programming | | | |
| The WB | November | Local/syndicated programming | | Tiny Toon Adventures (reruns) | Captain Planet and the Planeteers (reruns) | Local/syndicated programming | | | | | | | | | | | | | | Bugs 'n' Daffy (Mon.-Thu.); Animaniacs (Fri.) | Animaniacs (Mon.-Thu.); Pinky and the Brain (Fri.) | Pinky and the Brain (Mon.-Thu.); The New Batman/Superman Adventures (Fri.) | The New Batman/Superman Adventures (Mon.-Thu.); Men in Black (Fri.) | Local/syndicated programming | | | |
| The WB | December | Local/syndicated programming | | Tiny Toon Adventures (Mon.-Thu., reruns); Channel Umptee-3 (Fri.) | Captain Planet and the Planeteers (reruns) | Local/syndicated programming | | | | | | | | | | | | | | Bugs 'n' Daffy (Mon.-Thu.); Animaniacs (Fri.) | Animaniacs (Mon.-Thu.); Pinky and the Brain (Fri.) | Pinky and the Brain (Mon.-Thu.); The New Batman/Superman Adventures (Fri.) | The New Batman/Superman Adventures (Mon.-Thu.); Men in Black (Fri.) | Local/syndicated programming | | | |
| The WB | June | Local/syndicated programming | | Tiny Toon Adventures (Mon.-Thu., reruns); Channel Umptee-3 (Fri.) | Captain Planet and the Planeteers (reruns) | Local/syndicated programming | | | | | | | | | | | | | | Bugs 'n' Daffy | Animaniacs | Pinky and the Brain | The New Batman/Superman Adventures | Local/syndicated programming | | | |
| UPN | | Local/syndicated programming | | | | | | | | | | | | | | | | | | | | **Breaker High** | **Sweet Valley High** | Local/syndicated programming | | | |

Notes:

- ABC, NBC and CBS offered their early morning newscasts via a looping feed (usually running as late as 10:00 a.m. Pacific Time) to accommodate local scheduling in the westernmost contiguous time zones or for use a filler programming for stations that do not offer a local morning newscast; some stations without a morning newscast may air syndicated or time-lease programs instead of the full newscast loop.
- NBC allowed owned-and-operated and affiliated stations the preference of airing Another World and Days of Our Lives in reverse order from the network's recommended scheduling. Some NBC affiliates did not air Sunset Beach in the noon timeslot, opting to air local news and/or syndicated programming instead, and often placing the soap opera in a late morning or afternoon time slot.
- Fox Kids temporarily aired Eerie, Indiana Mondays and Wednesdays at 4:30 p.m. ET from November 10, 1997, to January 2, 1998.

=== Saturday ===
| Network | | 7:00 am | 7:30 am | 8:00 am | 8:30 am | 9:00 am | 9:30 am | 10:00 am | 10:30 am | 11:00 am | 11:30 am | noon | 12:30 pm | 1:00 pm | 1:30 pm | 2:00 pm | 2:30 pm | 3:00 pm | 3:30 pm | 4:00 pm | 4:30 pm | 5:00 pm | 5:30 pm | 6:00 pm | 6:30 pm |
|---|---|---|---|---|---|---|---|---|---|---|---|---|---|---|---|---|---|---|---|---|---|---|---|---|---|
| ABC | Fall | Local and/or syndicated programming | | **101 Dalmatians: The Series** | **Disney's One Saturday Morning** (featuring Brand Spanking New! Doug, **Recess**, and **Pepper Ann**) | | | | The Bugs Bunny and Tweety Show / Schoolhouse Rock! (11:26AM) | | Jungle Cubs | The New Adventures of Winnie the Pooh | **Science Court** | ABC Sports and/or local programming | | | | | College Football on ABC | | | | | | |
| ABC | December | Local and/or syndicated programming | | **101 Dalmatians: The Series** | **Disney's One Saturday Morning** (featuring Brand Spanking New! Doug, **Recess**, and **Pepper Ann**) | | | | The Bugs Bunny and Tweety Show / Schoolhouse Rock! (11:26AM) | | Jungle Cubs | The New Adventures of Winnie the Pooh | **Science Court** | ABC Sports and/or local programming | | | | ABC Sports programming | | | | | | Local news | ABC World News Saturday |
| CBS | Fall | Beakman's World | **Fudge** | **The New Ghostwriter Mysteries** | **Wheel 2000** | **CBS News Saturday Morning** | | | | **The Sports Illustrated for Kids Show** | **The Weird Al Show** | SEC on CBS | | | | | | | | | | | | | |
| CBS | Winter | Beakman's World | CBS Storybreak | **The New Ghostwriter Mysteries** | **Wheel 2000** | **CBS News Saturday Morning** | | | | **The Sports Illustrated for Kids Show** | **The Weird Al Show** | CBS Sports and/or local programming | | | | | | CBS Sports programming | | | | | | Local news | CBS Evening News |
| NBC | | Local and/or syndicated programming | | Today | | | | Saved by the Bell: The New Class | **City Guys** | Saved by the Bell: The New Class | Hang Time | | NBA Inside Stuff | NBC Sports and/or local programming | | | | NBC Sports programming | | | | | | Local news | NBC Nightly News |
| Fox | Fall | Local and/or syndicated programming | | Bobby's World | Stickin' Around | The Spooktacular New Adventures of Casper | **Space Goofs** | Ultimate Goosebumps | Eerie, Indiana | Life with Louie | X-Men | Local and/or syndicated programming | | Fox Sports and/or local programming | | | | | | | | | | Local and/or syndicated programming | |
| Fox | October | Local and/or syndicated programming | | Bobby's World | Stickin' Around | **Ninja Turtles: The Next Mutation** | **Space Goofs** | Ultimate Goosebumps | **The Adventures of Sam & Max: Freelance Police** | Life with Louie | X-Men | Local and/or syndicated programming | | Fox Sports and/or local programming | | | | | | | | | | Local and/or syndicated programming | |
| Fox | November | Local and/or syndicated programming | | Bobby's World | Life with Louie | **Ninja Turtles: The Next Mutation** | Ultimate Goosebumps | Spider-Man | Space Goofs | Life with Louie | X-Men | Local and/or syndicated programming | | Fox Sports and/or local programming | | | | | | | | | | Local and/or syndicated programming | |
| Fox | February | Local and/or syndicated programming | | **Mowgli: The New Adventures of the Jungle Book** | **Ned's Newt** | Ultimate Goosebumps | **Toonsylvania** | Spider-Man | Space Goofs | **Eerie, Indiana: The Other Dimension** | **Silver Surfer** | Local and/or syndicated programming | | Fox Sports and/or local programming | | | | | | | | | | Local and/or syndicated programming | |
| Fox | April | Local and/or syndicated programming | | Ned's Newt | Power Rangers in Space | Ultimate Goosebumps | Eerie, Indiana: The Other Dimension | Spider-Man | Toonsylvania | Silver Surfer | The Adventures of Sam & Max: Freelance Police | Local and/or syndicated programming | | Fox Sports and/or local programming | | | | | | | | | | Local and/or syndicated programming | |
| Fox | Summer | Local and/or syndicated programming | | Ned's Newt | Power Rangers in Space | Spider-Man | Toonsylvania | Spider-Man | Toonsylvania | **Pick of the Week** | The Adventures of Sam & Max: Freelance Police | Local and/or syndicated programming | In the Zone | Fox Sports and/or local programming | | | | | | | | | | Local and/or syndicated programming | |
| The WB | Fall | Local and/or syndicated programming | | Animaniacs | Superman: The Animated Series | **The New Batman/Superman Adventures** | | **The Legend of Calamity Jane** | Pinky and the Brain | Animaniacs | The Sylvester & Tweety Mysteries | Local and/or syndicated programming | | | | | | | | | | | | | |
| The WB | October | Local and/or syndicated programming | | **Channel Umptee-3** | Superman: The Animated Series | **Men in Black: The Series** | The New Batman/Superman Adventures | | Pinky and the Brain | Animaniacs | The Sylvester & Tweety Mysteries | Local and/or syndicated programming | | | | | | | | | | | | | |
| The WB | December | Local and/or syndicated programming | | Pinky and the Brain | Superman: The Animated Series | **Men in Black: The Series** | The New Batman/Superman Adventures | | Pinky and the Brain | Animaniacs | The Sylvester & Tweety Mysteries | Local and/or syndicated programming | | | | | | | | | | | | | |
| The WB | July | Local and/or syndicated programming | | Pinky and the Brain | The New Batman/Superman Adventures | | | Men in Black: The Series | Pinky and the Brain | The Sylvester & Tweety Mysteries | The Sylvester & Tweety Mysteries | Local and/or syndicated programming | | | | | | | | | | | | | |

Notes:

- Kids' WB temporarily aired Animaniacs aired at 8:00 a.m. ET until October 25, The New Batman/Superman Adventures aired at 9:00 a.m. ET until October 11, and The Legend of Calamity Jane aired at 10:00 a.m. ET from September 13 to 27, 1997.

=== Sunday ===
| Network | | 7:00 am | 7:30 am | 8:00 am | 8:30 am | 9:00 am | 9:30 am | 10:00 am | 10:30 am | 11:00 am | 11:30 am | noon | 12:30 pm | 1:00 pm | 1:30 pm | 2:00 pm | 2:30 pm | 3:00 pm | 3:30 pm | 4:00 pm | 4:30 pm | 5:00 pm | 5:30 pm | 6:00 pm | 6:30 pm |
|---|---|---|---|---|---|---|---|---|---|---|---|---|---|---|---|---|---|---|---|---|---|---|---|---|---|
| ABC | | Local and/or syndicated programming | | Good Morning America Sunday | | This Week with Sam & Cokie | | Local and/or syndicated programming | | ABC Sports and/or local programming | | | | | | | | | | | | | | Local news | ABC World News Sunday |
| CBS | | Local and/or syndicated programming | | | | CBS News Sunday Morning | | | Face the Nation | Local and/or syndicated programming | | CBS Sports and/or local programming | | | | | | | | | | | | Local news | CBS Evening News |
| NBC | Fall | Local and/or syndicated programming | | Today | | Meet the Press | | Local and/or syndicated programming | | | | NFL on NBC | | | | | | | | | | | | | |
| NBC | Mid-winter | Local and/or syndicated programming | | Today | | Meet the Press | | Local and/or syndicated programming | | | | NBC Sports and/or local programming | | | | | | | | | | | | Local news | NBC Nightly News |
| Fox | Fall | Local and/or syndicated programming | | | | Fox News Sunday | | Local and/or syndicated programming | | | | Fox NFL Sunday | | Fox NFL | | | | | | | | | | | |
| Fox | Mid-winter | Local and/or syndicated programming | | | | Fox News Sunday | | Local and/or syndicated programming | | | | Fox Sports and/or local programming | | | | | | | | | | | | Local and/or syndicated programming | |
| UPN | | **Algo's FACTory** | Local and/or syndicated programming | | | Jumanji | The Incredible Hulk | **Breaker High** | **Sweet Valley High** | Local and/or syndicated programming | | | | | | | | | | | | | | | |

== By network ==
=== ABC ===
Returning series:

- ABC World News This Morning
- ABC World News Tonight with Peter Jennings
- All My Children
- The Bugs Bunny and Tweety Show
- Brand Spanking New! Doug
- General Hospital
- Good Morning America
- Good Morning America Sunday
- Jungle Cubs
- The New Adventures of Winnie the Pooh (reruns)
- One Life to Live
- Port Charles
- Schoolhouse Rock! (reruns)
- This Week
- The View

New series:

- **Disney's One Saturday Morning**
  - **101 Dalmatians: The Series**
  - **Recess**
  - **Pepper Ann**
  - **Science Court**

Not returning from 1996–97:

- ABC Weekend Special
- Bone Chillers
- Caryl & Marilyn: Real Friends
- The City
- DuckTales (reruns)
- Flash Forward
- Gargoyles: The Goliath Chronicles
- The Mighty Ducks
- Nightmare Ned
- Street Sharks

=== CBS ===
Returning series:

- As the World Turns
- Beakman's World
- The Bold and the Beautiful
- CBS Evening News
- CBS Morning News
- CBS News Sunday Morning
- CBS Storybreak (reruns)
- CBS This Morning
- Face the Nation
- Guiding Light
- The Price Is Right
- The Young and the Restless

New series:

- **CBS News Saturday Morning**
- Fudge (reruns)
- **The New Ghostwriter Mysteries**
- **The Sports Illustrated for Kids Show**
- **The Weird Al Show**
- **Wheel 2000**

Not returning from 1996–97:

- Ace Ventura: Pet Detective
- Bailey Kipper's P.O.V.
- The Mask: The Animated Series
- Project Geeker
- Secrets of the Cryptkeeper's Haunted House
- Teenage Mutant Ninja Turtles
- The Lion King's Timon & Pumbaa
- The Twisted Tales of Felix the Cat

=== NBC ===
Returning series:

- Another World
- Days of Our Lives
- Leeza
- Meet the Press
- NBC News at Sunrise
- NBC Nightly News
- Sunset Beach
- Today
- TNBC
  - Hang Time
  - NBA Inside Stuff
  - Saved by the Bell: The New Class

New series:

- TNBC
  - **City Guys**

Not returning from 1996–97:

- Real Life with Jane Pauley
- TNBC
  - California Dreams

=== Fox ===
Returning series:

- Fox Kids Network
  - Bobby's World
  - C Bear and Jamal
  - Eerie, Indiana (reruns)
  - Goosebumps
  - Life with Louie
  - Power Rangers Power Playback
  - Power Rangers Turbo
  - Spider-Man
  - The Spooktacular New Adventures of Casper
  - Stickin' Around
  - X-Men
- Fox News Sunday
- In the Zone

New series:

- Fox Kids Network
  - **The Adventures of Sam & Max: Freelance Police**
  - **Beetleborgs Metallix**
  - **Cartoon Cabana**
  - **Eerie, Indiana: The Other Dimension**
  - **Mowgli: The New Adventures of the Jungle Book**
  - **Ned's Newt**
  - **Ninja Turtles: The Next Mutation**
  - **Power Rangers in Space**
  - **Silver Surfer**
  - **Space Goofs**
  - **Toonsylvania**

Not returning from 1996–97:

- Fox After Breakfast
- The Vicki Lawrence Show
- Fox Kids Network
  - The Adventures of Batman & Robin
  - Big Bad Beetleborgs
  - Eek! Stravaganza
  - Fox's Peter Pan & the Pirates (reruns)
  - Power Rangers Zeo
  - The Tick
  - Where on Earth Is Carmen Sandiego?

=== UPN ===
Returning series:

- The Incredible Hulk
- Jumanji

New series:

- **Algo's FACTory**
- **Breaker High**
- **Sweet Valley High**

Not returning from 1996–97:

- Bureau of Alien Detectors
- The Mouse and the Monster

=== The WB ===
Returning series:

- Kids WB!
  - Animaniacs
  - Bugs 'n' Daffy
  - Pinky and the Brain
  - Superman: The Animated Series
  - The Sylvester & Tweety Mysteries

New series:

- Kids WB!
  - Batman: The Animated Series (reruns)
  - Captain Planet and the Planeteers (reruns)
  - **Channel Umptee-3**
  - **The Legend of Calamity Jane**
  - **Men in Black: The Series**
  - **The New Batman Adventures**
  - Tiny Toon Adventures (reruns)

Not returning from 1996–97:

- Kids WB!
  - The Daffy Duck Show
  - Earthworm Jim
  - Freakazoid!
  - Road Rovers
  - Waynehead

== See also ==
- 1997-98 United States network television schedule (prime-time)
- 1997-98 United States network television schedule (late night)

== Sources ==
- https://web.archive.org/web/20071015122215/http://curtalliaume.com/abc_day.html
- https://web.archive.org/web/20071015122235/http://curtalliaume.com/cbs_day.html
- https://web.archive.org/web/20071012211242/http://curtalliaume.com/nbc_day.html
- https://kidsblockblog.wordpress.com/2012/10/25/fox-kids-weekday-lineups-1997-1998/
- https://www.cs.cmu.edu/~aarong/from-andrew/wb/kidswb-schedule.html
- https://www.cs.cmu.edu/~aarong/from-andrew/upn/upnkids-schedule.html
