= The Adventures of Sam & Max: Freelance Police =

Animated television series

- Title card
- Also known as: Sam & Max: Freelance Police!!!
- Genre: Police comedy
- Created by: Steve Purcell
- Based on: Sam & Max by Steve Purcell
- Developed by: J.D. Smith
- Directed by: Steve Whitehouse
- Voices of: Harvey Atkin; Robert Tinkler; Tracey Moore; Dan Hennessey; Patrick McKenna
- Composer: John Tucker
- Countries of origin: United States; Canada
- No. of seasons: 1
- No. of episodes: 13 (24 segments)

Production
- Executive producers: Patrick Loubert; Michael Hirsh; Clive A. Smith; Robert Ross; Gwenn Saunders Eckel
- Producers: J.D. Smith; Jocelyn Hamilton
- Running time: 22 minutes
- Production company: Nelvana

Original release
- Network: Fox Kids (U.S.); YTV (Canada)
- Release: October 4, 1997 – April 25, 1998

The Adventures of Sam & Max: Freelance Police, also known as Sam & Max, is an animated television series, based on the Sam & Max comic series by Steve Purcell. The series follows vigilante private investigators Sam and Max, an anthropomorphic dog and a lagomorph or "hyperkinetic rabbity-thing" respectively, as they investigate strange and bizarre cases and confront the criminals responsible.

The series, produced by Nelvana, aired from October 4, 1997 to April 25, 1998 on the Fox Kids block in the United States and YTV in Canada, producing 13 episodes (with 24 segments) and winning the 1998 Gemini Award for "Best Animated Series". Despite being well-received and performing well, the series was cancelled after just one season.

== Premise ==
The series revolves around Sam and Max, a pair of anthropomorphic self-styled private detectives, based in an office in a run-down district of New York City. Sam is a 6-foot anthropomorphic canine dog detective dressed in a noir-styled suit and hat. Max is an easily excitable 3-foot "hyperkinetic rabbity thing". As the Freelance Police, they are frequently accepting missions from the mysterious Commissioner, Sam and Max's mysterious agent and only known link to any form of official government body. The pair are often joined by Darla "The Geek" Gugenheek, the detectives' personal 12-year-old scientist and laboratory technician, housed in the pair's very own "Sub-Basement of Solitude". She often provides the duo with new gadgets and inventions to aid them on their missions. Lorne, The Friend for Life serves as Sam and Max's clingy and over-exuberant fan, and self-declared "friend for life", who only ends up annoying the duo and getting in the way of them doing their job.

The assignments usually lead them into far-off and exotic locales such as the Moon, Mount Olympus, the centre of the Earth or the mutant inhabited waters of Bohunk Lagoon. In between these assignments, the pair also manage to squeeze in fridge-spelunking, time traveling, Bigfoot-hunting and numerous other escapades. There were also holiday-themed episodes, such as visiting a prison on Christmas and delivering an artificial heart on Valentine's Day.

Due to the series' children-based demographic, scenes of violence and profanity were heavily toned down compared to other Sam & Max media; for example, Sam's revolver had been removed entirely. However, the series maintained the franchise's irreverent, edgy and absurd humour portrayed in the comics.

== Characters ==
=== Main cast ===
- Harvey Atkin as Sam
- Robert Tinkler as Max
- Tracey Moore as Darla "The Geek" Gugenheek
- Dan Hennessey as the Commissioner
- Patrick McKenna as Lorne, the Friend For Life

=== Additional voices ===
- Michael Caloz as Gary (in "The Trouble with Gary")
- Neil Crone
- Damon D'Oliveira
- Tony Daniels as Kent Standit (in "The Glazed McGuffin Affair")
- Don Francks as Santa Claus (in "Christmas Bloody Christmas")
- David Hemblen as Mack Salmon (in "They Came from Down There", "The Final Episode")
- Pam Hyatt as Grandma
- Keith Knight as Professor (in "Aaiiieee Robot")
- Rick Miller
- Steve Ouimette
- Susan Roman
- Ron Rubin
- John Stocker
- Aron Tager
- Adrian Truss
- Maurice Dean Wint

== Episodes ==
No.	Title	Written by	Original release date
1	"The Thing That Wouldn't Stop It"	J.D. Smith	October 4, 1997
A strange monster living inside The Geek's fridge is attacking people. Sam & Max must find a way to stop it!
2a	"The Second Show Ever"	J.D. Smith	October 11, 1997
Sam & Max show up at a school's Career Day and take the class to space, where they meet an alien named Lactose the Intolerant who is plotting to destroy the Earth. They try to stop him and look good for the kids.
2b	"Max's Big Day"	J.D. Smith	October 11, 1997
Sam & Max are dropped on an island and the New Guinea Pigs think Max is their 'chosen one'. But Max must say goodbye to Sam... can he really do it?
3a	"Bad Day on the Moon"	Steve Purcell	October 18, 1997
Sam and Max travel to the Moon to help rat people handle their roach problem. Based on the comic Bad Day on the Moon.
3b	"They Came from Down There"	Hugh Duffy	October 18, 1997
The population of a town has now become a mass of fish-like zombies thanks to Mack Salmon's plan of Sea Chimp food products.
4a	"The Friend for Life"	Steve Purcell	October 25, 1997
Lorne, The Friend for Life, accidentally lets "The Mad Thespian" get away. So, Lorne takes him hostage to try to force Sam & Max to hang out with him at his twisted funhouse.
4b	"Dysfunction of the Gods"	Marty Isenberg & Robert N. Skir	October 25, 1997
Zeus and Hera are angry and fighting. If the Freelance Police don't help them rekindle their love for each other, Sam & Max will age rapidly.
5a	"Big Trouble at the Earth's Core"	Bob Ardiel	November 1, 1997
Sam & Max go to the center of the Earth to stop the mole men from blowing up the Earth by lowering the core temperature – and help them find dates!
5b	"A Glitch in Time"	Dale Schott	November 1, 1997
Max obtains a time traveling watch which he and Sam use to alter their own history (back when they were children), causing Sam to have never become a member of the Freelance Police.
6a	"That Darn Gator"	Jamie Tatham	November 8, 1997
Sam & Max try and raise a baby alligator in their deranged life style.
6b	"We Drop at Dawn"	Hugh Duffy	November 8, 1997
Sam & Max drop into the jungle (Central Park) to look for the Commissioner's keys.
7a	"Christmas Bloody Christmas"	Steve Purcell	December 20, 1997
Sam & Max spend Christmas with Sam's grandma at her maximum security prison on Blood Island. But the criminals led by Herzog attempt a jailbreak and the Freelance Police must round them up.
7b	"It's Dangly Deever Time"	Steve Purcell (story), Marty Isenberg & Robert N. Skir	December 20, 1997
After their TV goes out, they try to watch a show on the Geek's antique TV and bring a Howdy Doody-like character to life. But while they are gone, Dangly Deever's evil twin called Deadly Dangly Deever emerges and attempts to take over the city.
8a	"Aaiiieee Robot"	Marty Isenberg & Robert N. Skir	February 6, 1998
After stopping a meteor from hitting Earth with the Mega Max 3000 robot, it sits and rusts away. So, they send it to Japan where it battles a giant baby.
8b	"The Glazed McGuffin Affair"	Bob Ardiel	February 6, 1998
Sam & Max try to get Kent Standit, who has banned the Freelance Police's favorite snack "Glazed McGuffins", to change his mind by forcing him to at least try one.
9a	"The Tell Tale Tail"	Tim Burns	February 13, 1998
A Sam & Max version of Frankenstein where Max's tail is severed in an accident, and they reanimate it while the doctor also creates a monster! The tail, that is.
9b	"The Trouble with Gary"	Tracy Berna	February 13, 1998
Sam & Max help babysit the child who changes things with his mind, who helps the Freelance Police with stopping crime and learns how to have fun....Sam & Max style.
10a	"Tonight We Love"	Hugh Duffy	February 20, 1998
Sam & Max must deliver an artificial heart to the President on Valentine's Day, but the DeSoto is stolen by a loving couple.
10b	"The Invaders"	Marty Isenberg & Robert N. Skir	February 20, 1998
Two tiny aliens are constantly trying to eliminate Sam & Max. No matter what they do, the Freelance Police can not stop the Invaders.
11a	"Kiss Kiss, Bang Bang"	Hugh Duffy	February 27, 1998
Sam & Max must play 007 to stop T.R.U.S.S. leader "Larvo" and her fast food minions from releasing an obnoxious tourist virus.
11b	"Little Bigfoot"	Steve Purcell	February 27, 1998
The Freelance Police save a kid Sasquatch from being a bus boy and try to send it into the wild with its own kind.
12a	"Fools Die on Friday"	Jamie Tatham	April 18, 1998
Sam & Max attempt to foil a blimp hijacking aimed to crash into The Statue of Liberty only to find the demented terrorist is Lorne, the Friend for Life.
12b	"Sam & Max vs. the Uglions"	Tim Burns & J.D. Smith	April 18, 1998
An alien race called the Uglions open a new restaurant, "The Frying Saucer", that serves people....no really, it's people!. Sam & Max must stop the Uglions before the US government start a nuclear holocaust to try to stop the Uglions.
13	"The Final Episode"	J.D. Smith	April 25, 1998
Mack Salmon leads the Mad Thespian, the Uglion High Ruler, Herzog, Lactose the Intolerant, and Deadly Dangly Deever in a plot to kill Sam & Max by strapping them to a bomb and dropping them into a volcano. They attempt to get free and subdue the bad guys, all while reliving flashbacks of their early life.

== Production ==
=== Development and writing ===
A television cartoon adaptation of the Sam & Max comic book series was initially conceptualized by Steve Purcell following the success of Sam & Max Hit the Road, who sought to adapt the duo into another medium. Such project was also proposed by Marty Isenberg, an animation writer working at Fox, after looking at the comic books, who took a liking to its humour. After the rights to produce the series was picked up by Nelvana, Isenberg would meet up with Purcell and writer J.D. Smith to pitch the idea to Fox Kids, who approved it and commissioned a season with 24 segments.

Purcell, who was living in a barn in Marin County, California at the time, received scripts from the crew in Toronto and make any jokes and adjustments to it. He would occasionally fly to Toronto to help with casting and music productions. One comic, Bad Day on the Moon, was adapted into an episode of the same name; Purcell wrote a 30-page draft and was forced to cut it down in order to fit a 10-minute slot. He was responsible for writing four episodes, including "Bad Day on the Moon" and wrote the jokes for all of the episodes.

Unlike the comics it was based on which had more mature comedy, this series was aimed towards a children and, as a Saturday-morning cartoon, its humour and themes had to be toned down to fit the Fox Kids demographic; as a result, many vulgar jokes had to be cut and the usage of guns was omitted entirely. Purcell and Smith still maintained the wacky irreverent humour that was seen in previous titles, though Purcell still criticized the Fox network's standards and practices department during production of the show. Some jokes however were considered too much for some parents who called for the series to be pulled from the network. Purcell lamented that he was "a little pleased that they had managed to ruffle some feathers along the way". The series' episodes referenced other media, such as Planet of the Apes, Frankenstein, 2001: A Space Odyssey and James Bond.

Darla "The Geek" was an entirely original character created for the show, intended to be another sidekick to Sam and Max. She was originally envisioned as a teenage boy, but was changed to be a girl due to suggestions by Fox Kids executives. The executives originally intended for Max to be female, which was dismissed by Purcell and Smith, and so Darla's gender change was made as a compromise.

=== Casting ===
The audition process for Sam & Max lasted several months. Eventually, Harvey Atkin was cast as Sam, Robert Tinkler was cast as Max and Tracey Moore was cast as Darla; neither Atkin nor Tinkler were aware of the comic book series or Hit the Road prior to production of the show. Previous voice actors in Hit the Road, in particular Bill Farmer and Nick Jameson, didn't reprise their roles due to the TV series not being within the Screen Actors Guild.

Atkin had previous successes voicing in many TV series, such as being cast as King Koopa in various Mario television series. He auditioned for the role of Sam, portraying him as a "great big-eared sloppy dog who [he guessed] is kind of slow and would talk that way", and brought with him his fast-paced and wacky dialogue to the show. Comparatively, Tinkler had less experiences in voice acting; Sam & Max was his first original series that he voiced in. He offered his own interpretation of Max.

=== Cancellation ===
The Adventures of Sam & Max: Freelance Police was cancelled after the first season aired, with Purcell citing personnel changes at Fox and Atkin citing budget disputes between Fox and Nelvana. Its timeslot on Fox Kids was replaced by The Secret Files of the Spy Dogs in the following television season.

== Telecast and media releases ==
The Adventures of Sam & Max: Freelance Police first aired as part of the Fox Kids block in the United States during the 1997–98 television season. In Canada, it also aired on YTV. According to Purcell, the show managed to reach 25% of its audience when it first aired.

The series won the 13th Gemini Awards in 1998 for "Best Animated Program or Series".

Selected episodes from the show had been released in three separate compilations on VHS by Sullivan Entertainment. The episodes included in the VHS compilations are as follows:

The Y Files	All Creatures Great and Small	Come Fly With Me
"Sam & Max vs. the Uglions"; "The Invaders"; "They Came from Down There"; "The Trouble with Gary"	"The Thing That Wouldn't Stop It"; "The Second Show Ever"; "The Tell Tale Tail"; "Big Trouble at the Earth's Core"; "That Darn Gator"; "Little Bigfoot"	"Max's Big Day"; "Dysfunction of the Gods"; "We Drop at Dawn"; "Bad Day on the Moon"; "Kiss Kiss, Bang Bang"; "Aaiiieee Robot"

GameTap released one episode from the show each week on GameTap TV in October 2006, as a promotion for Telltale Games' Sam & Max: Season One. Their schedule includes a release of every episode, appearing out of order. Up until mid-July 2008 all episodes (except "Fools Die on Friday") were available to watch online at GameTap for free until the GameTap TV section was shut down as part of a site redesign.

In March 2008, the complete series was released by Shout! Factory. Features include original case art by Steve Purcell, three "educational" shorts, an interview with Purcell, a short featurette about Telltale Games, an art gallery, an "Original Series Bible", a Flash-based cartoon titled 'Our Bewildering Universe' and a playable demo of Ice Station Santa. A sticker of the Sam & Max title card was also included.

As of 2026, the show is now streaming on Tubi and Pluto TV.
