= The Magician (French TV series) =

- Genre: Superhero
- Created by: Florian Ferrier; Savin Yeatman; Gilles Adrien
- Directed by: Oumar N' Diaye; Xavier Giacometti; Olivier Poirette
- Voices of: Michael Donovan; Charles Napier; Rob Paulsen; Kath Soucie; Billy West
- Composer: Hervé Lavandier
- Country of origin: France
- Original languages: French; English
- No. of seasons: 1
- No. of episodes: 39

Production
- Executive producer: Marc du Pontavice
- Producer: Marc du Pontavice
- Editors: Florence Poli; Daniel Reynes
- Running time: 21 minutes
- Production company: Gaumont Multimedia

Original release
- Network: France 2/France 3 (France); ProSieben (Germany); Fox Kids (United States)
- Release: September 2, 1998 – May 26, 1999

The Magician (French: Le Magicien) is a French animated superhero television series created by Florian Ferrier, Savin Yeatman and Gilles Adrien, the second of whom also served as the series' story editor. It was produced by Gaumont Multimedia in 1997 and is currently owned by Xilam. It aired on France 3 starting on September 2, 1998, and later on Fox as part of its Fox Kids programming block in 1999 as one of the few European shows to air in the US at the time.

== Synopsis ==
A series of scientific discoveries and radical advances in technology have re-organized society during the third millennium. Taking advantage of widespread hope and optimism in Electro City, the crime syndicates (chiefly under the mobster "Black Jack" Malone and "Sonny Boy" Serge) have discreetly taken control of all important positions. They are repeatedly defeated by protagonist Ace Cooper, his magic assistant Cosmo, his pet black panther Zina, his CPU Angel, and his police contact Lt. Derek Vega.

== Characters ==
=== Main characters ===
- Ace Cooper (voiced by Michael Donovan) – The main protagonist of the series. He is a famous stage magician and superhero, who co-operates with the police against criminals. In an earlier life, Ace used to be the former assistant of Jack "Black Jack" Malone until an accident he was involved in caused Ace to leave Jack's services. Since then, he managed to become a magic-based superhero that fights "Black Jack" Malone. Ace invokes his superhero apparel with the incantation "Magical Force, reveal the power within".
  - Zina (vocal effects provided by Kath Soucie) – Ace Cooper's pet black panther.
- Cosmo (voiced by Rob Paulsen) – Ace Cooper's magician's assistant and sidekick. He was taken in by Ace after his careless father abandoned him.
- Lt. Derek Vega (voiced by Charles Napier) – A police lieutenant for the Electro City Police Department who helps Ace and Cosmos in their investigations.
- Angel (voiced by Kath Soucie) – The CPU of Ace Cooper's Magic Express.

=== Villains ===
- Jack "Black Jack" Malone (voiced by Charles Napier) – The primary antagonist of the series, the principal crime boss in Electro City, and the proprietor of the "Croesus Palace" casino. Following an accident involving Ace who used to work for him, "Black Jack" Malone is confined to a triangle-bottomed hoverchair. Despite the criminal activities he has committed, he has never been convicted of anything due to various loopholes and having high-level connections.
  - Diamond (voiced by Rob Paulsen) – "Black Jack" Malone's intelligent henchman.
  - Spade (voiced by Michael Donovan) – "Black Jack" Malone's strong henchman.
  - Clockwise (voiced by Billy West) – "Black Jack" Malone's strategist, accountant, and lawyer who often assists "Black Jack" Malone in using methods to keep him from getting indicted.
- "Sonny Boy" Serge (voiced by Rob Paulsen) – A millionaire mobster, owner of the "Sunset" casino, and the son of engineer Jonathan Serge. He tends to be at odds with "Black Jack" Malone and periodically with his dad as well.
- Faceless (voiced by Kath Soucie) – A full-costumed female assassin and sneak thief hired by "Black Jack" Malone to kill the Magician. Faceless' gloves have retractable claws. Captain Friedrich refuses to believe she even exists despite what Ace, Cosmo, and Lt. Vega keep telling him.
- Yago (voiced by Rob Paulsen) – A magician who is a rival of Ace Cooper.
- Dr. Blaun (voiced by Michael Donovan) – A mad scientist.
- Gus Morland (voiced by Billy West) – A former friend of Ace Cooper who is revived from his cryonic state as a cryonic mutant. He planned revenge on "Black Jack" Malone until Ace stopped him and restored him to normal.
- Aldus Teron (voiced by Billy West) – The head of a company that wanted to place his mind in a specially-bred child.
- Glam (voiced by Michael Donovan) – A pirate who targeted the Nova celebrity cruise ship.
- Count Hebron (voiced by Rob Paulsen) – A hunter.

=== Other characters ===
- Captain Friedrich (voiced by Rob Paulsen) – The police captain of the Electro City Police Department who distrusts Ace Cooper. He's very incompetent at his job, overriding Vega on every case; proven wrong publicly over and over to the point that him still being employed is the real magic trick.
- Mona Malone (voiced by Kath Soucie) – The daughter of "Black Jack" Malone and Ace Cooper's childhood beloved. She often works with Ace to keep her father's plans from going too far. Mona occasionally sings at her father's club, which Ace attends; "Black Jack" allows this as a small truce between them.
- Duc Paparazzo (voiced by Billy West) – A reporter who covers the various activities in Electro City.
- DJ Mikkus (voiced by Michael Donovan) – A musical composer that is friends with Ace Cooper.
- Skip Ramsdale – A Flipball player for the Electro City Strikers who is a friend of Ace Cooper.
- Senator Dobbs (voiced by Michael Donovan) – The senator of Electro City who screens "Black Jack" Malone from prosecution as "Black Jack" Malone is close friends with him.

== Production ==
The series producer, Marc du Pontavice, president of the then-Gaumont Multimédia, grew up with comic books in his childhood, one of which was the Mandrake the Magician comics, whose stories revolved around magic. For years, du Pontavice harbored the desire to base a show on magic, and coupled with the studio's desire to invent an original action/adventure series that emulated the tradition of American comics from the 1940s, it became a springboard for the creation of the show.

In October 1995, at MIPCOM, du Pontavice decided to bring his vision of the series to life and spoke with Marie-Line Petrequin, the vice president of animation at the German television channel ProSieben. Petrequin liked the idea from the start, but the problem of violence was increasing in Germany, and this was a series more about thinking than about very harsh actions, but she was sure they were interested in the show. Marc also initiated a meeting with Bertrand Mosca, then head of programming at France 3, where he was very enthusiastic about the simple idea of creating a superhero main character with magic as its theme. At the time, the show was just an idea.

Florian Ferrier created the characters and designed the protagonist Ace Cooper, along with a troop of helpers. Savin Yeatman and Gilles Adrien developed the complete bible that served as the basis for the series, which they completed in June 1996. Around the same time, some scripts and synopses were ready to be released, where, in du Pontavice's words, "they practically had the series."

In the summer of 1996, Gaumont invited France 3 to review everything that had been developed up to that point. The channel gave the studio some feedback, including comments on the vision for the main character Ace, which was very close to the tradition of Marvel Comics, full of muscular characters. They wanted to make him less muscular, to make him more elegant and classy. In August 1996, du Pontavice invited Petrequin from ProSieben, which had partnered with Gaumont on all the series the studio had produced since 1994, to his office in Paris, where the two companies signed an agreement within 48 hours. According to Petrequin, at that time, ProSieben had much more animation than it does now, so there were many vacancies to fill. From the beginning, the channel's main concerns had to do with the representation of women in the program. At each stage, Gaumont asked ProSieben for feedback, where, according to them, they always asked for more active women in the series, where the dialogue [of the girls] was very superficial, they were reacting, and in a very traditional way, they were not proactive, and they were not making independent decisions. At the time, there were no series on the market with young girls in central roles, which ended up changing.

At MIPTV in April of the same year, du Pontavice and his team orchestrated a meeting with Giochi Preziosi, which was seeking to become a global force and was looking for properties to create toy lines. The toymaker liked the show. In October of the same year at MIPCOM, Gaumont closed a deal with Giochi Preziosi for the company to develop toys based on the series.

The series was offered to the BBC in the United Kingdom, and the American children's channels Nickelodeon and Disney Channel, who told Gaumont that it was a great concept, but suggested making it "an anti-Batman show", making it bright and colorful. Production of the series itself began in May 1997 thanks to a financing arrangement with ProSieben and had six scripts written. France 2 and France 3, both from France Télévisions, decided to join the production of the show. The production of the first episode of The Magician was completed in July 1998.

The American toy company that Giochi Preziosi had hired to represent The Magician products sent its designs, but neither the Italian company nor du Pontavice were satisfied with the results. According to them, they were turning the characters into warriors, which they disliked intensely, and the contracted company failed to understand the concept behind the show. It was then that Gaumont suggested to Giochi that the studio's own artists design the figures, marking their first foray into toy design. Giochi Preziosi loved Gaumont's toys, which were based on the studio's designs. The series was conceived with both boys and girls in mind, though in the words of du Pontavice, "it is the boys who hold the remote control and decide what to watch." However, he noted that in the two years leading up to the show's premiere, girls had become less passive and began to make their own demands. Consequently, he and the production team introduced elements specifically for a female audience, such as the impossible love story between Ace Cooper and Mona Malone. The series' budget was $360,000 per episode.

== Episodes ==
| No. | Title | Written by | Original release date |
|---|---|---|---|
| 1 | "Race for Your Life" | Savin Yeatman | September 2, 1998 |
Ace is framed for a crime by doctored videos made by Black Jack and learns that Diamond and Spade intend to murder Jim Speed, a professional racer. Accordingly, Ace saves Speed while Cosmo exposes the false accusation.
| 2 | "Black Cat" | Herve Renoh | September 9, 1998 |
A circus' black Panther is forced to attack two scientists by a former colleague of theirs, on behalf of the corporation for which all three had worked, and Ace's own panther Zina is blamed by the police. Ace, Cosmo, Lt. Vega, and the circus' trainer 'Yokiko' jointly recover the two panthers, defeat the mad scientist Dr. Pax of the Millix Corporation, and exonerate Zina.
| 3 | "Mad Train" | Laurent Turner | September 16, 1998 |
An attempt is made on the Senator Dobb's life by an ex-employee Bill Peach. Cooper then saves Cosmo and a circus from a train (originally belonging to Ace himself) sent by Peach to destroy both.
| 4 | "Cyber" | Herve Renoh | September 23, 1998 |
When robots are sent to join the police force, Ace, Cosmo, and Lt. Vega terminate plans by Black Jack to use the robots against the city.
| 5 | "Masters of Magic" | Jean-Luc Ayach | September 30, 1998 |
A rival magician called Yago loses his assistant Zeline to Ace, and thereupon assists a bank-robbery and challenges Ace to a contest of magic. When Ace wins, Yago is required to return the stolen money and surrender to the police.
| 6 | "Vega Gate" | Silvan Boris Schmid | October 7, 1998 |
Lt. Vega is accused of taking bribes when set up by singer Ritchie Vilanti. Ace and Cosmo clear his name and expose Ritchie Vilanti.
| 7 | "A Model Top Model" | Jean-Luc Ayach | October 14, 1998 |
Beauty queen "Zelda" uses Ace and Cosmo to escape her employers at the Universal Beauty Institute where their scientist Dr. Blaun create clones of her to justify their copyright of her likeness. Ace and Cosmo interrupt the scheme, and Zelda exposes it on live broadcast which incriminates the culprits.
| 8 | "Croesus Crisis" | Régis Vedal (story) & Frederic Lenoir | October 21, 1998 |
Mobster "Sonny Boy" Serge opens a casino to spite his rival "Black Jack" Malone, and Ace and Cosmo intervene, to foreshorten a gang war; but the story is complicated when Sonny Boy hires a Vodun practitioner to poison Black Jack. Ultimately, Ace and Cosmo terrify both mobsters into submission with an illusory god-monster.
| 9 | "The Prophecy" | Gilles Adrien | October 28, 1998 |
A Gypsy fortune-teller named Nausica clues in on a dangerous strongbox. Ace recovers the strongbox before it can be used by Black Jack to pollute the city's water supply.
| 10 | "Behind the Orb-Ball" | Jeffrey P. Kearney | November 4, 1998 |
Sports champion "Skip" Ramsdale is the latest of many to be drugged illegally, and injured; Ace infiltrates the competition to expose the crime.
| 11 | "What Were You Doing in Electro City When the Lights Went Off?" | Raphael Thomas | November 11, 1998 |
The cold fusion batteries that empower Electro City are all simultaneously de-activated, after an attempt on their inventor Johnathan Serge's life by his estranged son the mobster "Sonny Boy" Serge. Ace and Cosmo foil Sonny's plan, and his father Professor Jonathan Serge re-activates the power.
| 12 | "Best Wishes and Happiness" | Laurent Turner | November 18, 1998 |
Black Jack's daughter Mona agrees to marry a scientist named Max Malden in exchange for his restoration of her father's long-crippled legs. Ace exposes the cure as a fraud.
| 13 | "The Challenge" | Frederic Lenoir | November 25, 1998 |
Patrick Schumacher, the host of a defunct game-show, attempts revenge on Ace for the latter's greater popularity. Ace and Cosmo survive his obstacle-course and expose the network's Director of Programming as the mastermind behind the crime.
| 14 | "Golden Voice" | Herve Renoh | December 2, 1998 |
Contenders for the episode's eponymous Award are threatened, and in some cases injured, by unknown assailants working for Crenone and Demonia. Ace and Cosmo rescue the last two, and one of these (Mona Malone) wins the Award.
| 15 | "Planet Electric" | Laurent Turner | December 9, 1998 |
Ace is framed for food poisoning at the restaurant 'Planet Electric', and Cosmo, in the attempt to clear his name, is captured by Black Jack's thugs. Ace, D.J. Mikkas, and Skip Ramsdale rescue him, but fail to expose Black Jack's connection to the crime and incriminate only its immediate culprit: the restaurateur Mr. Banks.
| 16 | "Stop Clowning Around" | Herve Renoh | December 16, 1998 |
A circus act is sabotaged on behalf of Black Jack Malone, until Ace and Cosmo expose his agent among the performers.
| 17 | "Stars of the Silver Screen" | Herve Renoh | December 23, 1998 |
A film based on a presumed-deceased journalist's career is plagued by sabotage to prevent its exposure of Black Jack's past crimes. Ace discovers that the leading actress is the journalist herself and protects her from Diamond, Spades, and Sonny Boy's henchmen.
| 18 | "Cold Sweat, Part 1" | Olivier Montegut | December 30, 1998 |
A former friend of Ace's named Gus Morland is revived from a cryonic state in the form of a cryogenic mutant, and pursues Ace.
| 19 | "Cold Sweat, Part 2" | Olivier Montegut | January 6, 1999 |
Gus attacks Black Jack, whom he blames for his mutation. Both of them are saved by Ace and Gus is restored to his human state.
| 20 | "And They Lived Happily Ever After" | Taro Ochiai | January 13, 1999 |
Black Jack's strategist Clockwise sends thieves to discover all the city's important secrets, in the guise of a matchmaking agency; Ace infiltrates the agency to spoil the plan, and discovers that all the spies are androids. When Black Jack abandons the plan, the androids' creator Dr. Cabaliye sends his remaining creations to kill Black Jack's daughter; but they are defeated by Ace and Cosmo.
| 21 | "Twin Brothers" | Silvan Boris Schmid | January 20, 1999 |
An impostor impersonates Ace and persuades both Cosmo and Ace's supercomputer 'Angel' into thinking he's Ace. The imposter is vanquished by Ace in a contest of magic.
| 22 | "Faceless" | Silvan Boris Schmid | January 27, 1999 |
Introduces a Catwoman-like sneak-thief named Faceless whom Ace pursues but fails to capture.
| 23 | "Truth or Consequences" | Laurent Turner | February 3, 1999 |
Ace's friend Skip Ramsdale is accused of injuring rival Flipball player Barsky. Ace exposes the accusation as false at Skip's trial and incriminates Skip's manager Bob Redd.
| 24 | "Bad Program" | Gilles Adrien | February 10, 1999 |
Rex-1, the leading character of a video game, is accidentally converted into a real being and holds a civic administrator hostage until defeated by Ace and Cosmo.
| 25 | "X-Oshi" | Frederic Lenoir, Savin Yeatman | February 17, 1999 |
X-Oshi (a species of robotic pet), having become ubiquitous in the city, unexpectedly turn criminal; whereupon Ace and Cosmo vanquish their prototype, who commands the others.
| 26 | "Stealth Robber" | Silvan Boris Schmid | February 24, 1999 |
Ace discovers Faceless smuggling money in an invisible helicopter, and is ordered by the Police Department to recover the money and cripple her operation.
| 27 | "The Paparazzo Affair" | Laurent Turner | March 3, 1999 |
Newscaster Duc Paparazzo is attacked by gunmen after he threatens to expose a pharmaceutical businessman John Wosh's criminal past in his real name of Paul Kelly. He is rescued by Ace, and the Paul Kelly is later imprisoned for the attempt to kill both.
| 28 | "Multi-Flames" | Herve Renoh | March 10, 1999 |
Ace investigates mysterious fires caused by a pyromaniac Multi-Flames. Ace discovers that Multi-Flames is a firefighter named Lt. Atika where she has a vendetta against Sonny Boy for the faulty equipment that he had a hand in.
| 29 | "Hardbeat" | Frederic Lenoir | March 17, 1999 |
Cosmo, and other youths of the city, are driven to violence by a strain of music concealed in their favorite records, to justify martial law in Electro City. Ace, and composer "D.J." Mikkas, expose the deception in public, and humiliate its masterminds.
| 30 | "Bad Weather for the Magician" | Savin Yeatman, Laurent Turner | March 24, 1999 |
Ace and Cosmo trace a series of meteorological disruptions to weather reporter Zoran Spring and eventually destroy his weather-control apparatus.
| 31 | "Junior" | Herve Renoh | March 31, 1999 |
The scientist Nataschia, to prevent her employer Aldus Teron's transference of his own mind into the brain of a specially-bred child, leaves the child in the care of Ace, Cosmo, and Mona. Her employer contends with these for possession of the child until his defeat.
| 32 | "The Cruise" | Jeffrey P. Kearney, Savin Yeatman | April 7, 1999 |
The Nova celebrity cruise liner is sunk. Ace and Cosmo find a pirate captain called Glam scheming to plunder the ancient artifacts it carried, and lead the police to destroy his base and recover the artifacts.
| 33 | "A Sheep in Wolf's Clothing" | Frederic Lenoir, Savin Yeatman | April 14, 1999 |
Some of Cosmo's friends are tricked by Sonny Boy into kidnapping his father, and thus into a gun-fight with the Police and Sonny's followers; but Ace rescues the elder Surge, and Cosmo conceals the evidence of his friends' participation in the crime.
| 34 | "No Dice!" | Laurent Turner | April 21, 1999 |
Gambler Joe Tucker plants explosives in two famous gambling-casinos, and threatens a third. Ace defeats him in single combat and causes the third explosive to explode harmlessly in the air.
| 35 | "Virtual Fatality" | Laurent Turner | April 28, 1999 |
Jimmy Hagen, a descendant of the city's founders, kidnaps Ace to copy his magic through a telepathic virtual reality apparatus. Ace is rescued by Cosmo and humiliates Hagen in public.
| 36 | "The Flight of Prosperity" | Frederic Lenoir | May 5, 1999 |
Two escaped convicts, Sally Blade and her sister Bodycount, force the singer Mona Malone to assist the hijacking of a luxury dirigible and its passengers upon being hired by Black Jack. Ace and Lt. Vega defeat the convicts in mid-flight and Ace returns the passengers safely to the ground.
| 37 | "The Chase" | Jeffrey P. Kearney, Savin Yeatman | May 12, 1999 |
Derailed in the desert, Ace and Cosmo are captured by the eccentric hunter Count Hebron and forced through an obstacle-course with him in pursuit. They later outwit him, and Lt. Vega takes Hebron prisoner.
| 38 | "Professor Cosmo" | Frederic Lenoir | May 19, 1999 |
At a science-fair, and later through the city, Cosmo and Black Jack compete for control of a nearly-indestructible robot, until Jack attaches his own motorized chair to the robot, and thus establishes an impenetrable neural interface; whereupon Ace, having originally come to rescue Cosmo, defeats Jack in single combat. Thereafter, Jack claims to have subdued the robot himself, and thus escapes punishment.
| 39 | "All Against One" | Savin Yeatman | May 26, 1999 |
After Faceless, Spade, and Diamond cause a prison break at the Electro City Police Department, Ace's enemies Yago, Dr. Blaun, Glam, and Count Hebron unite with Black Jack's group and Sonny Boy's group. Ace even learns of this upon subduing Aldus Teron who had obtained freedom on his own. Following an ambush by Yago, Dr. Blaun, Count Hebron, and Faceless, Ace is presumed dead following the attack on him. He is recovered by Cosmo, Vega, Mona, and Zina. Mona assists Ace and Cosmo to arouse the criminal masterminds against each other. Ultimately, most of the criminals are imprisoned with the exceptions of Faceless and Sonny Boy. Clockwise reminds Captain Friedrich that Black Jack is a close friend of Senator Dobbs and claims that the villains held him and Mona hostage.

== Crew ==
- Jim Gomez – Voice Director
