= Mowgli: The New Adventures of the Jungle Book =

Canadian-American live action television series

- Created by: Timothy Scott Bogart; Guy Toubes; James Hereth
- Directed by: Brent Loefke; David Briggs; Michael McGreevey; John Blizek; Timothy Scott Bogart; William Tannen
- Starring: Sean Price-McConnell; Lindsey Peter; Bart Braverman; Richard Assad; Jaime Gutierrez Victory; Maryam d'Abo; Kavi Raz
- Composer: Peter Bernstein
- Countries of origin: Canada; United States
- No. of seasons: 1
- No. of episodes: 26

Production
- Executive producers: Jeff Franklin; Steve Waterman; Timothy Scott Bogart; J. Christopher Fahlman
- Producers: Guy Toubes; James Hereth; Dianne Dixon; Cary Glieberman; Keenan Robinson; Elliot Schick; Allan Pacheco Dent
- Running time: 22 minutes
- Production companies: Wolfcrest Entertainment; Franklin/Waterman Worldwide; Alliance Entertainment

Original release
- Network: FOX (Fox Kids)
- Release: February 7 – August 1, 1998

Mowgli: The New Adventures of the Jungle Book is a live action television series based on the Mowgli stories from the Rudyard Kipling novels, The Jungle Book and The Second Jungle Book. A contemporary adaptation, the series has Mowgli joined on his adventures by a young American girl, named Nahbiri, who has accompanied her widowed doctor father to Jabalpur, India. The show was created by Timothy Scott Bogart, Guy Toubes, and James Hereth and produced by Wolfcrest Entertainment and Franklin/Waterman Worldwide, and distributed internationally by Alliance Films. It premiered on the Fox Kids in the United States on February 7, 1998 and ran until August 1 of the same year.

== Episodes ==
| No. | Title | Directed by | Written by | Original release date |
|---|---|---|---|---|
| 1 | "Mowgli of the Seoni: Part 1" | Unknown | Unknown | February 7, 1998 |
| 2 | "Mowgli of the Seoni: Part 2" | Unknown | Unknown | February 14, 1998 |
| 3 | "A New Beginning" | Unknown | Unknown | February 21, 1998 |
| 4 | "The Bigger Picture" | Unknown | Unknown | February 28, 1998 |
| 5 | "Side by Side" | Unknown | Unknown | March 7, 1998 |
| 6 | "What Goes Around..." | Unknown | Unknown | March 14, 1998 |
| 7 | "Friend or Foe" | Unknown | Unknown | March 21, 1998 |
| 8 | "Circus Breaker" | TBD | TBD | UNAIRED? |
| 9 | "The Perfect Shot" | TBD | TBD | UNAIRED? |
| 10 | "Song of Akela" | TBD | TBD | UNAIRED? |
| 11 | "The Hollow Bird" | TBD | TBD | UNAIRED? |
| 12 | "Fatherhood" | TBD | TBD | UNAIRED? |
| 13 | "Cold Lairs" | TBD | TBD | UNAIRED? |
| 14 | "Rashomowgli" | TBD | TBD | UNAIRED? |
| 15 | "Mowgli, P.I." | TBD | TBD | UNAIRED? |
| 16 | "Good Intentions" | TBD | TBD | UNAIRED? |
| 17 | "Best Friends" | TBD | TBD | UNAIRED? |
| 18 | "Life Lessons" | TBD | TBD | UNAIRED? |
| 19 | "Outback and Back Out" | TBD | TBD | UNAIRED? |
| 20 | "The Guardian" | TBD | TBD | UNAIRED? |
| 21 | "Going to Extremes" | TBD | TBD | UNAIRED? |
| 22 | "Paper Chase" | TBD | TBD | UNAIRED? |
| 23 | "Feeling Trapped" | TBD | TBD | UNAIRED? |
| 24 | "Run Like the Wind" | TBD | TBD | UNAIRED? |
| 25 | "Return to Cold Lairs: Part 1" | TBD | TBD | UNAIRED? |
| 26 | "Return to Cold Lairs: Part 2" | TBD | TBD | UNAIRED? |
