= The Cat&Birdy Warneroonie PinkyBrainy Big Cartoonie Show =

Television series

The Cat&Birdy Warneroonie PinkyBrainy Big Cartoonie Show, or The Big Cartoonie Show for short, is a compilation program that aired on Kids' WB from January 16, 1999 to August 31, 2000. It followed a theme similar to previous Saturday morning cartoons featuring Looney Tunes shorts (an example being The Bugs Bunny and Tweety Show, which was still airing on ABC at the time).

== Format ==
Originally running for 90 minutes in length, the first four episodes featured Looney Tunes shorts with newly made title cards, as well as short segments originally featured on Animaniacs, The Sylvester and Tweety Mysteries, Pinky and the Brain, and Pinky, Elmyra & the Brain.

Following the first four episodes when Kids' WB began airing Pokémon on February 13, 1999, the series was reduced to a 30-minute format and showed only Animaniacs, Pinky and the Brain and Pinky, Elmyra & the Brain segments. Notably, it was through The Big Cartoonie Show that most episodes of the latter program were shown, as its low popularity caused it to be swiftly removed from the schedule in November 1998.

Despite the fact that most of the series was made up of old material, the show was popular enough to gain a second season. In this season, the series' full name was changed to The Cat&Bunny Warneroonie SuperLooney Big Cartoonie Show and only featured episodes from Tiny Toon Adventures and Animaniacs. For this season, the series was given host segments starring two animated kids named Karen and Kirby (voiced by Cheryl Chase and Richard Steven Horvitz, respectively). The Big Cartoonie Show was also aired on weekday afternoons, where the Looney Tunes shorts were also being featured.

The series was cancelled at the end of the 1999–2000 season, with its last airing on August 31, 2000. With this, Tiny Toon Adventures, Animaniacs, Pinky and the Brain, Pinky, Elmyra & the Brain, and Looney Tunes were retired from the Kids' WB block to make way for the 2000-2001 lineup.

In July 2023, the series began airing on the Croatian free-to-air television network Nova TV.
