= The New Batman/Superman Adventures =

US animated television series

- Based on: Batman by: Bob Kane; Bill Finger; Superman by: Jerry Siegel; Joe Shuster
- Starring: Kevin Conroy; Tim Daly; Mathew Valencia; Arleen Sorkin; Dana Delany; Efrem Zimbalist Jr.
- Theme music composer: Shirley Walker
- Composers: Michael McCuistion; Lolita Ritmanis; Shirley Walker; Kristopher Carter; Harvey Cohen
- Country of origin: United States

Production
- Running time: 44 minutes
- Production company: Warner Bros. Television Animation

Original release
- Network: Kids' WB
- Release: September 13, 1997 – February 12, 2000

Related
- Superman: The Animated Series; Batman: The Animated Series; The New Batman Adventures

The New Batman/Superman Adventures is a name given to an animated package series that combined Superman: The Animated Series with The New Batman Adventures produced by Warner Bros. Animation. It aired from 1997 to 2000 on Kids' WB. Although it was part of the DC Animated Universe, each half-hour episode in the hour-and-one-half block featured either a single repeat from the original Superman: The Animated Series run, the original Batman: The Animated Series run, or a brand new story featuring Batman from The New Batman Adventures. These new stories focus more on Batman's supporting cast and introduced new characters such as Tim Drake. The two animated universes were united in the Superman episode "World's Finest", which tells the story of Batman and Superman's first meeting. The new Batman episodes that began airing in the Fall 1997 season were later released as a DVD box set of Batman: The Animated Series as Volume 4. New Superman episodes that later aired in the Fall 1998 season and onward are now considered to be the third season of Superman: The Animated Series.

== Production ==
In 1997, it was announced that the Batman series would have a revamp, replacing its art style with streamlined designs for more consistent animation, and to maintain similarity with the simultaneously running Superman: The Animated Series (1996–2000). The WB wanted more episodes of Batman, so 24 new episodes were produced featuring a format that focused more on Batman's supporting cast. Also, because of the animation similarities, TNBA was aired simultaneously with the Superman series as part of an hour-long segment called The New Batman/Superman Adventures. The shows shared a brand new opening, but TNBA was later given the same opening and closing of BTAS when aired in syndication and released on home video.

== Voice cast ==
=== Main cast ===
Actor	Role
Kevin Conroy	Bruce Wayne / Batman
Tara Strong	Barbara Gordon / Batgirl
Dana Delany	Lois Lane
Efrem Zimbalist Jr.	Alfred Pennyworth
Robert Costanzo	Detective Harvey Bullock
Tim Daly	Clark Kent / Superman

=== Regular villains ===
Actor	Role
Mark Hamill	The Joker
Arleen Sorkin	Harley Quinn
Clancy Brown	Lex Luthor
Corey Burton	Brainiac

=== Recurring characters ===
- Bob Hastings – Commissioner Gordon
- Loren Lester – Dick Grayson / Nightwing
- Nicholle Tom – Kara In-Ze / Kara Kent / Supergirl
- Joseph Bologna – SCU Lt. Daniel "Dan" Turpin
- George Dzundza – Perry White
- Mathew Valencia -Tim Drake / Robin
- Lauren Tom – Angela Chen
- David Kaufman – James "Jimmy" Olsen

=== Recurring villains ===
- Ron Perlman – Matt Hagen / Clayface, Jax-Ur
- Michael Ansara – Victor Fries / Mr. Freeze
- Paul Williams – Oswald Cobblepot / The Penguin
- Diane Pershing – Dr. Pamela Isley / Poison Ivy
- John Glover – Edward Nygma / The Riddler
- Jeffrey Combs – Prof. Jonathan Crane / The Scarecrow
- Richard Moll – Harvey Dent / Two-Face
- George Dzundza – Arnold Wesker / The Ventriloquist / Scarface
- Adrienne Barbeau – Selina Kyle / Catwoman
- Roddy McDowall – Dr. Jervis Tetch / The Mad Hatter
- Henry Silva – Bane
- Brooks Gardner – Waylon Jones / Killer Croc
- Mark Rolston – Garfield Lynns/Firefly
- Laraine Newman – Mary Dahl / Baby Doll
- Charity James – Roxanne Sutton/Roxy Rocket
- Sela Ward – Page Monroe/Calendar Girl
- Stephen Wolfe Smith – Klarion the Witch Boy
- Lori Petty – Leslie Willis / Livewire
- Michael Ironside – Darkseid
- Malcolm McDowell – John Corben / Metallo
- Michael Dorn – Kalibak
- Bruce Weitz – Bruno Mannheim
- Gilbert Gottfried – Mister Mxyzptlk
- Brad Garrett – Lobo
- Bud Cort – Toyman

== Episodes ==
The following are the crossover episodes from the two series:

No.	Title	Directed by	Written by	Series	Original release date
29	"World's Finest"	Toshihiko Masuda	Alan Burnett, Paul Dini and Rich Fogel; Story by : Alan Burnett and Paul Dini	Superman: The Animated Series	October 4, 1997
30	"World's Finest"	Toshihiko Masuda	Steve Gerber; Story by : Alan Burnett and Paul Dini	Superman: The Animated Series	October 4, 1997
31	"World's Finest"	Toshihiko Masuda	Stan Berkowitz; Story by : Alan Burnett and Paul Dini	Superman: The Animated Series	October 4, 1997
The Joker steals a large piece of Kryptonite and then comes to Metropolis, offering to kill Superman for Lex Luthor in exchange for one billion dollars. Meanwhile, Bruce Wayne visits Metropolis to negotiate a business deal with Lex. Bruce also uses this opportunity to suit up as Batman and hunt him. Superman, wary of Batman's vigilantism, uses his X-ray vision to discover his identity, while Batman uses a tracking device on Superman's cape to discover his. The Joker kidnaps Lois Lane and uses her as bait in an attempt to kill Superman. He has her bound and gagged in a LexCorp lab and calls Superman telling his location. Superman wears his radiation-proof suit, but Joker uses acid from his boutonnière to melt through the suit. Batman manages to stop him and save the two, causing Lex Luthor to become irritated and give him one last chance to defeat the two. After the Joker fails to defeat Superman and Batman again, Lex Luthor, out of fear that he will be exposed, tries to withdraw from the deal by killing him. This fails and leads instead to the Joker trying to take revenge on Superman by destroying Metropolis in a giant wing, while he uses the other half of the Kryptonite to try to stop him. It is ultimately up to Superman and Batman to stop this madness. Note: The episodes were later released on VHS, Laserdisc and DVD as The Batman/Superman Movie: World's Finest, a direct-to-video compilation of the episodes that originally aired back-to-back-to-back as a single TV special during the second season of Superman: The Animated Series.
43	"Knight Time"	Curt Geda	Robert Goodman	Superman: The Animated Series	October 10, 1998
Superman comes to Gotham to fill in for Batman, who has mysteriously disappeared.
20	"Girls' Night Out"	Curt Geda	Hilary J. Bader	The New Batman Adventures	October 17, 1998
Supergirl must team up with Batgirl to take down Poison Ivy, Harley Quinn, and Livewire in Gotham City, while Batman and Superman are unavailable to help them.
52	"The Demon Reborn"	Dan Riba	Rich Fogel	Superman: The Animated Series	September 18, 1999
Ra's al Ghul needs Superman's strength to fully heal, so Batman steps in to stop him.

== Accolades ==
Year	Award	Category	Nominee(s)	Result	Ref.
1998	Annie Awards	Outstanding Achievement in an Animated Daytime Television Program	The New Batman/Superman Adventures	Won	

== See also ==
- World's Finest Comics
- World's Finest Team
