= List of programs broadcast by Arutz HaYeladim =

This is a list of programs currently, formerly, and soon to be broadcast by the Arutz HaYeladim.

== Productions ==
- Al Mali VeLama (על מלי ולמה)
- Alifim (אליפים)
- Deus (דאוס)
- Eilat (אילת)
- Elisha (אלישע)
- Etz HaPitpuzm (עץ הפיטפוזים)
- Galis (גאליס)
- Ginat Hahaftaot (גינת ההפתעות)
- HaBigbagim (הביגבגים)
- HaEe (האי)
- HaHolmim (החולמים)
- HaKita HaMeofefet (הכיתה המעופפת)
- HaMachsan Shel Keilu (המחסן של כאילו)
- HaMofa Shel Guru VeGogol (המופע של גורו וגוגול)
- Ha'Nephilim (הנפילים)
- HaPijamot (הפיג'מות)
- HaShminiya (השמיניה)
- Hugo (הוגו)
- Kadur Poreach (כדור פורח)
- Mario (מריו)
- Mishpacha Sholetet (משפחה שולטת)
- Nidhafim (נדחפים)
- Oboy (או-בוי)
- Proyect HaLehaka (פרוייקט הלהקה)
- Rosh Gadol (ראש גדול)
- Sipurey Uli VeYuli (סיפורי אולי ויולי)
- Shovrey Galim (שוברי גלים)
- Sofsheli (סופשלי)
- Teivat HaHaftaot (תיבת ההפתעות)
- ZoomZoom (זומזום)

== Live-action ==
- 1/2 falta
- 24Seven
- The A-Team
- The Adventures of the Black Stallion
- A Different World
- A gURLs wURLd
- Ace Lightning
- The Adventures of Pete & Pete
- The Adventures of Mary-Kate & Ashley
- ALF
- All in the Family
- All Over the Workplace
- Amazing Stories
- Amigos x siempre
- Amy, la niña de la mochila azul
- Animal Atlas
- Animal Ark
- Animorphs
- Are You Afraid of the Dark?
- Art Ninja
- Artzooka!
- Atracción x4
- Baby Talk
- Backyard Science
- Barney & Friends
- Baxter
- Beakman's World
- Bear in the Big Blue House
- Beverly Hills, 90210
- Big Bad Beetleborgs
- The Bionic Woman
- The Blobheads
- The Brady Bunch
- Breaker High
- Cake
- Casi Ángeles
- Cavegirl
- Charles in Charge
- Cheers
- Chicken Minute
- Children of the Dog Star
- Chiquititas
- Chiquititas sin fin
- City Life
- Clarissa Explains It All
- Clueless
- Code Lyoko: Evolution
- Cómplices Al Rescate
- Consentidos
- Connor Undercover
- Crash Zone
- Cybergirl
- Cybernet
- The Cosby Show
- Dance! La Fuerza del Corazón
- Dance Revolution
- Dance Academy
- Darcy's Wild Life
- Dark Oracle
- Dead Gorgeous
- Debra!
- Deepwater Black
- Degrassi Junior High
- Degrassi High
- Degrassi: The Next Generation
- Diff'rent Strokes
- Divina, está en tu corazón
- The Elephant Princess
- Emily of New Moon
- Esperanza mía
- Extreme Babysitting
- Family Ties
- Family Matters
- The Famous Five
- The Famous Jett Jackson
- Finding Stuff Out
- Flight 29 Down
- Flipper
- Fraggle Rock
- The Fresh Prince of Bel-Air
- Full House
- Going to California
- Goosebumps
- Groundling Marsh
- Growing Pains
- Hallo Spencer
- Hangin' with Mr. Cooper
- Hannah Montana
- Hard Time on Planet Earth
- The Haunting Hour: The Series
- Harry and the Hendersons
- Head of the Class
- Helen and the Boys
- Hillside
- The Hogan Family
- Home Improvement
- How to Be Indie
- Hunter
- I Love Mummy
- I Was a Sixth Grade Alien
- Instant Star
- Iris, The Happy Professor
- Junior Vets
- Just for Laughs Gags
- Just Kidding
- Kenan & Kel
- Kirk
- Knight Rider
- The Latest Buzz
- Life with Derek
- Life with Boys
- Little House on the Prairie
- Little Star
- Lois & Clark: The New Adventures of Superman
- MacGyver
- Madison
- Major Dad
- Majority Rules!
- Married... with Children
- Masked Rider
- Me and My Monsters
- Meego
- Mentors
- Mi pequeña mamá
- Mighty Morphin Power Rangers
- Minor Adjustments
- Mirror, Mirror (TV series)
- Miss XV
- Moesha
- Morangos com Açúcar
- Mowgli: The New Adventures of the Jungle Book
- Mr. Young
- Mudpit
- The Muppet Show
- My Brother and Me
- My Secret Identity
- My Two Dads
- The Mystery Files of Shelby Woo
- Neighbours
- The New Adventures of Robin Hood
- Nick Freno: Licensed Teacher
- Nickelodeon Guts
- Night Man
- Ninja Turtles: The Next Mutation
- Ocean Girl
- The Odyssey
- One of the Boys
- Operation Ouch!
- Our Hero
- Pablo y Andrea
- Parker Lewis Can't Lose
- Party of Five
- Patito Feo
- Perfect Strangers
- Phenom
- Phil of the Future
- Pigasso's Place
- Police Academy: The Series
- Power Rangers Zeo
- Power Rangers Turbo
- Power Rangers in Space (repeats from Channel 2 and Fox Kids)
- Power Rangers Lost Galaxy (repeats from Channel 2 and Fox Kids)
- Power Rangers Time Force (repeats from Fox Kids)
- Power Rangers Samurai
- Power Rangers Megaforce
- Power Rangers Dino Charge (season 1 only)
- Punky Brewster
- Radio Free Roscoe
- Rebelde (Brazilian version)
- Rincón de Luz
- Roseanne
- Sabrina the Teenage Witch
- The Saddle Club
- Saved by the Bell
- Saved by the Bell: The College Years
- Saved by the Bell: The New Class
- Second Noah
- Secret Life of Toys
- The Secret World of Alex Mack
- Señales
- Sliders
- Split
- Step by Step
- Student Bodies
- The Suite Life of Zack & Cody
- Survive This
- Super Gran
- Super Rupert
- Supertorpe
- Sweet Valley High
- Sweat
- Taina
- That's So Raven
- Three's Company
- Two of a Kind
- VR Troopers
- The Wayne Manifesto
- Weird Science
- What I Like About You
- Wishbone
- Who's the Boss?
- Wicked Science
- Wimzie's House
- Wingin' It
- The Wonder Years
- Xuxa
- Zoo Clues

== Animated series ==
- 1 Minute in a Museum
- 1001 Nights
- 2 Stupid Dogs
- 64 Zoo Lane
- 6teen
- A Thousand and One... Americas
- Aaahh!!! Real Monsters
- Ace Ventura: Pet Detective
- The Adventures of Blinky Bill
- The Adventures of Hijitus
- The Adventures of Paddington Bear
- The Adventures of Rocky and Bullwinkle
- The Adventures of Sam
- The Adventures of Sam & Max: Freelance Police
- Adventures of Sonic the Hedgehog
- The Adventures of T-Rex
- The Adventures of Teddy Ruxpin
- The Adventures of Tintin
- Albert Says... Nature Knows Best
- ALF: The Animated Series
- Alias the Jester
- Alice in Wonderland
- Alien Racers
- Almost Naked Animals
- Alvin and the Chipmunks
- Amazing Animals
- The Amazing Spiez!
- Anatole
- Angel's Friends
- Angry Birds Toons
- Animalia
- Animal Crackers
- Animal Stories
- Animaniacs
- Anne of Green Gables
- Anthony Ant
- Archibald the Koala
- Archie's Weird Mysteries
- Around the World in 80 Days
- Around the World with Willy Fog
- Arthur
- Asha
- Astro Farm
- Atomic Betty
- Augie Doggie and Doggie Daddy
- Avenger Penguins
- B-Daman Crossfire
- B-Daman Fireblast
- Babar
- The Baby Huey Show
- Baby Looney Tunes
- Back to the Future: The Animated Series
- Bakugan Battle Brawlers
- Bananaman
- Bandolero
- Barbie Dreamtopia
- Barbie: Life in the Dreamhouse
- The Baskervilles
- Basket Fever
- The Basketeers
- Batman: The Animated Series
- Batman of the Future
- The Batman
- Batman: The Brave and the Bold
- Beast Wars: Transformers
- Ben 10
- Ben 10: Alien Force
- Beetlejuice: The Animated Series
- Being Ian
- Benjamin the Elephant
- The Berenstain Bears
- Beethoven
- Beverly Hills Teens
- Beyblade
- Beyblade: Metal Fusion
- BeyWheelz
- Bibi & Tina
- Big Guy and Rusty the Boy Robot
- The Big Knights
- Bill & Ted's Excellent Adventures: The Series
- Billy the Cat
- Bionic Max
- Birdz
- The Black Corsair
- Blaster's Universe
- Bleach
- The Bluffers
- The Blunders
- Bob and Margaret
- Bob the Builder (seasons 1-4)
- Bob in a Bottle
- Bobby's World
- Bozo: The World's Most Famous Clown
- The Boy
- Braceface
- Brambly Hedge
- Bratz
- Bratzillaz (House of Witchez)
- Breezly and Sneezly
- Bright Sparks
- The Brothers Flub
- Bruno the Kid
- A Bunch of Munsch
- Bureau of Alien Detectors
- The Busy World of Richard Scarry
- C Bear and Jamal
- The World of Calculín
- Camp Candy
- Camp Lakebottom
- Captain N: The Game Master
- Captain Zed and the Zee Zone
- Cardcaptor Sakura
- The Care Bears (DiC & Nelvana episodes)
- Carl²
- Carmen Sandiego
- CatDog
- Chaotic
- Casper's Scare School
- Cédric
- Célestin
- Chaplin & Co
- The Charlie Brown and Snoopy Show
- Chipie et Clyde
- Chowder
- Chucklewood Critters
- CJ the DJ
- Clang Invasion
- Cleopatra in Space
- Clay Kids
- C.L.Y.D.E.
- Cloudy with a Chance of Meatballs
- The Cobi Troupe
- Commander Clark
- Committed
- COPS
- Code Lyoko
- Codename: Kids Next Door
- The Comic Strip
- Contraptus
- Corduroy
- The Country Mouse and the City Mouse Adventures
- Corneil & Bernie
- Courage the Cowardly Dog
- Cosmic Cowboys
- Cow and Chicken
- Crafty Kids Club
- Creepy Crawlers
- Crayon Shin-chan
- Crocadoo
- Cubix
- Curious George
- Cyberchase
- The DaVincibles
- The Daltons
- Dan Vs.
- Dastardly and Muttley in Their Flying Machines
- Dennis the Menace
- Dennis the Menace and Gnasher
- Detective Bogey
- Dexter's Laboratory
- Di-Gata Defenders
- Dig and Dug
- Digimon Ghost Game
- Dino-Riders
- Dinofroz
- Dinosaur King
- Dinosaucers
- Dofus
- Dogtanian and the Three Muskehounds
- Doug
- Downtown
- Dr. Dimensionpants
- Dr. Dog
- Dragon Ball GT
- Dragon Ball Z
- Dragon Booster
- Dragon Flyz
- Dragon Tales
- Dream Defenders
- The Dreamstone
- Droopy, Master Detective
- Duel Masters
- Dumb Bunnies
- Dungeons & Dragons
- Ed, Edd n Eddy
- Edgar & Ellen
- Eek! The Cat
- Eggzavier the Eggasaurus
- Eliot Kid
- Elliot Moose
- Extreme Ghostbusters
- The Fairly OddParents (season 1–5)
- Fairy Tale Police Department
- Famous 5: On the Case
- Fantaghirò
- The Fantastic Voyages of Sinbad the Sailor
- Fantômette
- Fat Dog Mendoza
- Fievel's American Tails
- Felix the Cat
- Flight Squad
- The Flintstones
- Fly Tales
- Flying Rhino Junior High
- Foster's Home for Imaginary Friends
- Four Eyes!
- Fourways Farm
- Fox's Peter Pan & the Pirates
- The Foxbusters
- Franklin
- Freakazoid!
- Free Willy
- Fruits Basket
- Funky Cops
- Garfield and Friends
- Gawayn
- George of the Jungle (1967)
- George of the Jungle (2007)
- George Shrinks
- Geronimo Stilton
- G.I. Joe: A Real American Hero
- Girlstuff/Boystuff
- Gladiator Academy
- Gloria's House
- Gormiti
- The Gravediggers Squad
- The Greedysaurus Gang
- The Green Squad
- Groove High
- Growing Up Creepie
- Happy Ness: Secret of the Loch
- Hareport
- Hatchimals
- Hattytown Tales
- He-Man and the Masters of the Universe
- He-Man and the Masters of the Universe (2002)
- Heathcliff
- Heroes: Legend of the Battle Disks
- Hi Hi Puffy AmiYumi
- The High Fructose Adventures of Annoying Orange
- Hikaru no Go
- Histeria!
- Honeybee Hutch
- Horrid Henry
- Horseland
- Horrible Histories
- The Houndcats
- Huntik: Secrets & Seekers
- Hurricanes
- I Am Weasel
- I.N.K. Invisible Network of Kids
- Inami
- Inazuma Eleven
- Inazuma Eleven GO
- The Incredible Hulk (1982)
- Inspector Gadget
- Inuyasha
- Iznogoud
- The Itsy Bitsy Spider
- Ivanhoe The King's Knight
- Jackie Chan Adventures
- Jacob Two-Two
- Jacques Cousteau's Ocean Tales
- James Bond Jr.
- The Jetsons
- Jibber Jabber
- Jin Jin and the Panda Patrol
- Johnny Bravo
- Journey to the Heart of the World
- Journey to the West: Legends of the Monkey King
- Juanito Jones
- The Jungle Book
- The Jungle Bunch
- Jungle Tales
- Juniper Jungle
- Jumanji
- Justice League
- Justice League Unlimited
- Kaboodle
- Kaleido Star
- Kampung Boy
- The Karate Kid
- Kenny the Shark
- The Ketchup Vampires
- Kid Paddle
- The Kids from Room 402
- Kidd Video
- A Kind of Magic (season 1)
- Kipper (1999-2004)
- Kirby: Right Back at Ya!
- Larva
- Laurel and Hardy
- Le Bonheur de la vie
- League of Super Evil
- The Legend of Calamity Jane
- Legend of the Dragon
- The Legends of Treasure Island
- The Legend of White Fang
- Legion of Super Heroes
- The Life and Times of Juniper Lee
- Life with Louie
- Lilly the Witch
- Lisa
- The Littl' Bits
- Little Bear
- The Little Flying Bears
- Little Hippo
- The Little Lulu Show
- Little Monsters
- Little Nick
- The Little Prince
- Little Rosey
- Little Spirou
- The Littles
- Littlest Pet Shop
- Lola & Virginia
- LoliRock
- Looney Tunes
- Loopy De Loop
- The Lost World
- Lou!
- Macron 1
- Maggie and the Ferocious Beast
- Magi-Nation
- The Magic School Bus
- The Magician
- Maple Town
- Marco
- Martha Speaks
- Martin Morning
- The Magic Key
- Martin Morning
- Marvin the Tap-Dancing Horse
- Mary-Kate and Ashley in Action!
- The Mask: Animated Series
- Matt's Monsters
- Max Adventures
- Max Steel
- Maxie's World
- Maya & Miguel
- Maya the Honey Bee
- Men in Black: The Series
- Mermaid Melody Pichi Pichi Pitch
- Merrie Melodies
- Mew Mew Power
- Miffy
- Mighty Max
- Miniman
- The Minimighty Kids
- Minuscule
- Mix Master
- Moby Dick and the Secret of Mu
- Mona the Vampire
- Monster & Pirates
- Monster Allergy
- Monster by Mistake
- Monster High
- Monster Hunter Stories: Ride On
- Moville Mysteries
- The Mozart Band
- Mr. Bogus
- ¡Mucha Lucha!
- Mumble Bumble
- The Mumbly Cartoon Show
- Mummies Alive!
- The Mummy
- Musti
- My Dad the Rock Star
- My Favorite Fairy Tales
- My Friend Grompf
- My Goldfish Is Evil!
- My Pet Monster
- The Mysteries of Alfred Hedgehog
- Mythic Warriors
- Naruto
- Ned's Newt
- Nellie the Elephant
- Nerds and Monsters
- The Neverending Story
- The New Adventures of Lassie
- The New Adventures of Lucky Luke
- The New Adventures of Nanoboy
- The New Adventures of Peter Pan
- The New Adventures of the Shoe People
- The New Adventures of Speed Racer
- The New Adventures of Zorro
- The New Archies
- The New Batman Adventures
- The New World of the Gnomes
- Nils Holgersson
- Nina Patalo
- Noah's Island
- Noddy's Toyland Adventures
- Noozles
- Nutri Ventures
- Oakie Doke
- Oddbods
- Oggy and the Cockroaches (seasons 1-3)
- Old Bear Stories
- Om Nom Stories
- Once Upon a Time...
- Orson and Olivia
- Oscar and Friends
- Ovide and the Gang
- The Owl
- The Owl & Co
- Ox Tales
- Ozzy & Drix
- Pablo the Little Red Fox
- Pac-Man and the Ghostly Adventures
- Pelswick
- Percy the Park Keeper
- Pet Alien
- Piggsburg Pigs!
- The Pink Panther Show
- Pink Panther and Sons
- Pinky and the Brain
- Pinocchio: The Series
- Pippi Longstocking
- Pipsqueak's Planet
- Pirate Family
- Pixie and Dixie and Mr. Jinks
- Pocahontas
- Pocket Dragon Adventures
- Pok & Mok
- Pokémon (Seasons 1–10, 17-present)
- Pokémon Chronicles
- Polly Pocket
- Police Academy
- The Pondles
- PopPixie
- Postcards from Buster
- Pound Puppies
- Power Stone
- Powerbirds
- The Powerpuff Girls
- Princess of the Nile
- Project G.e.e.K.e.R.
- ProStars
- Q*bert
- The Raccoons
- The Ranch
- Ranma ½
- Ratz
- Raymond
- The Real Ghostbusters
- The Real Story of...
- Really Wild Animals
- ReBoot
- Redwall
- The Ren & Stimpy Show
- Rescue Heroes
- The Return of Dogtanian
- Ripley's Believe It or Not!: The Animated Series
- Road Rovers
- Robin Hood: Mischief in Sherwood
- Robinson Sucroe
- Robotboy
- Rocko's Modern Life
- Rod 'n' Emu
- Rolie Polie Olie
- RollBots
- Ruby Gloom
- Saban's Adventures of Oliver Twist
- Sabrina: The Animated Series
- Sabrina's Secret Life
- Sagwa, the Chinese Siamese Cat
- Sailor Moon
- Sally Bollywood: Super Detective
- Salty's Lighthouse
- Samurai 7
- Samurai Jack
- Samurai Pizza Cats
- Sandokan
- Sandra the Fairytale Detective
- Scaredy Squirrel
- Scooby-Doo, Where Are You!
- The Scooby-Doo Show
- The Secret Show
- Seven Little Monsters
- Sgt. Frog
- Sharky & George
- She-Ra: Princess of Power
- Sheeep
- Sherlock Holmes in the 22nd Century
- SheZow
- Sid the Science Kid
- Sidekick
- SilverHawks
- Simba, the King Lion
- Simon in the Land of Chalk Drawings
- The Simpsons (Seasons 1-5)
- Sitting Ducks
- Skunk Fu!
- Sky Dancers
- Slugterra
- The Small Giant
- The Smoggies
- The Smurfs (Seasons 1–4)
- Sonic Boom
- Sooty's Amazing Adventures
- Soul Music
- Snorks
- Space Goofs
- Space Strikers
- Spaced Out
- Spider-Man and His Amazing Friends
- Spider-Man (1994)
- Spider-Man: The New Animated Series
- The Spectacular Spider-Man
- Spider-Woman
- Spike and Suzy
- Spike Team
- Star Street: The Adventures of the Star Kids
- Static Shock
- Stickin' Around
- Street Football
- Stuart Little
- Sugar Sugar Rune
- Super 4
- Super Dave: Daredevil for Hire
- Super Duper Sumos
- The Super Globetrotters
- Superman: The Animated Series
- Supernormal
- The Super Mario Bros. Super Show!
- Sweet Little Monsters (season 1)
- Sylvanian Families
- The Sylvester & Tweety Mysteries
- Tai Chi Chasers
- Tales of the Tooth Fairies
- Taotao
- Tara Duncan
- Taz-Mania
- Teen Titans
- Teenage Fairytale Dropouts
- Teenage Mutant Ninja Turtles (1987)
- Teenage Mutant Ninja Turtles (2003)
- Tenkai Knights
- Theodore Tugboat
- Thomas & Friends (seasons 1-24)
- Thomas & Friends: All Engines Go
- The Three Bears
- The Three Friends and Jerry
- Three Little Ghosts
- Thundarr the Barbarian
- Thunderbirds Are Go
- ThunderCats
- Timberwood Tales
- Time Jam: Valerian & Laureline
- Time Warp Trio
- Timothy Goes to School
- Titeuf
- Tom
- Tom and Jerry
- Tom & Jerry Kids
- Tom and Jerry Tales
- Tommy e Oscar
- Toonsylvania
- Top Cat
- Total Drama
- Total Drama Presents: The Ridonculous Race
- Total DramaRama
- Totally Spies!
- Toto Trouble
- Touni et Litelle
- Tracey McBean
- Transformers: Prime
- Transformers: Robots in Disguise (2015) (season 1)
- The Triplets
- Trolls of Troy
- Tsubasa: Reservoir Chronicle
- Tupu
- The Twins of Destiny
- The Twisted Tales of Felix the Cat
- The Twisted Whiskers Show
- The Ugly Duckling
- Ultimate Book of Spells
- Vampires, Pirates & Aliens
- Visionaries: Knights of the Magical Light
- Viva Piñata
- The Wacky World of Tex Avery
- The Wacky World of Tic and Tac
- Wakfu
- Wakkaville
- Waldo's Way
- Wallace and Gromit
- Watership Down
- The Way Things Work
- Waynehead
- What-a-Mess
- What's New, Scooby-Doo?
- What's the Big Idea?
- Where on Earth Is Carmen Sandiego?
- Where's Wally?
- The Why Why Family
- Wild Kratts
- Wild West C.O.W.-Boys of Moo Mesa
- William's Wish Wellingtons
- Willy Fog 2
- Winx Club (seasons 1-4 and specials)
- Wisdom of the Gnomes
- Wish Kid
- Witch World
- WordGirl
- The World of David the Gnome
- The World of Peter Rabbit and Friends
- World of Quest
- The WotWots
- Wowser
- Wunderkind Little Amadeus
- Wyrd Sisters
- X-DuckX
- X-Men: Evolution
- Xiaolin Showdown
- Yakari
- Yogi Bear
- Yo-kai Watch
- Yolanda, Daughter of the Black Corsair
- Yu Yu Hakusho
- Yu-Gi-Oh! Duel Monsters
- Yu-Gi-Oh! GX
- Yu-Gi-Oh! 5D's
- Yu-Gi-Oh! VRAINS (season 1)
- Zazoo U
- The Zeta Project
- Zig & Sharko (season 1)
- Zip & Zap
- Zixx
- Zoids: Chaotic Century
- Zoids: New Century
- Zoolympics
- Zoocup

== Cartoon Network ==
In July 2011, Arutz Hayeladim started to air a block of shows distributed by Cartoon Network and in June 2012, by Warner Bros. Animation, as well. both contracts expired in January 2019, then yes held broadcast rights for new and library programs between August 2019 and October 2021. Shows which aired on the block included:

=== 2011 ===
- Ben 10: Alien Force (season 3)
- Bakugan: Gundalian Invaders
- Generator Rex
- Puppy in My Pocket: Adventures in Pocketville
- Adventure Time
- Total Drama Island (reruns)
- Total Drama Action (reruns)
- Total Drama World Tour (reruns)
- What's New, Scooby-Doo? (reruns)
- Legion of Super Heroes (reruns)

=== 2012 ===
- Ben 10: Ultimate Alien
- Hot Wheels Battle Force 5
- Redakai: Conquer the Kairu
- The Amazing World of Gumball
- Bakugan: Mechtanium Surge
- The Garfield Show
- The Looney Tunes Show
- Batman: The Brave and the Bold (reruns of season 1, and premieres of seasons 2–3)
- ThunderCats
- Regular Show
- Baby Looney Tunes
- Ben 10/Generator Rex: Heroes United (TV movie)
- Ben 10: Destroy All Aliens (TV movie)

=== 2013 ===
- Transformers: Prime
- Johnny Test (seasons 5–6)
- Angelo Rules
- Pound Puppies
- Ben 10: Omniverse
- Scooby-Doo! Mystery Incorporated
- Young Justice
- DreamWorks Dragons (season 1–2)
- Gormiti Nature Unleashed
- Green Lantern: The Animated Series

=== 2014 ===
- Mixels
- The Tom and Jerry Show
- Steven Universe
- Lego Star Wars: The Yoda Chronicles (season 1)
- Uncle Grandpa
- Transformers Prime Beast Hunters: Predacons Rising (TV movie)

=== 2015 ===
- Teen Titans Go!
- Transformers: Robots in Disguise (season 1)
- Inspector Gadget (2015)
- Lego Ninjago: Masters of Spinjitzu (season 4-5)
- Clarence
- Mr. Bean: The Animated Series
- Lego DC Comics: Batman Be-Leaguered (TV movie)

=== 2016 ===
- Wabbit
- Be Cool, Scooby-Doo!
- DC Super Hero Girls
- DC Super Hero Girls: Super Hero High (TV movie)

=== 2017 ===
- Batman Unlimited
- The Powerpuff Girls (2016)
- Oddbods
- We Bare Bears
- Supernoobs
- Bunnicula
- Ben 10 (2016)
- Justice League Action
- My Knight and Me
- Exchange Student Zero
- The Garfield Show: Rodent Rebellion (TV movie)
- Over the Garden Wall (TV movie)

== DreamWorks Animation ==
In 2016, Arutz Hayeladim started to air shows produced by DreamWorks Animation. Following NBCUniversal's acquisition of DreamWorks Animation in 2016, the partnership was expanded to include the output of NBCUniversal Global Distribution Kids & Family, including:

=== 2015 ===
- Turbo Fast

=== 2016 ===
- All Hail King Julien
- The Adventures of Puss in Boots
- Dragons: Race to the Edge
- Dinotrux
- The Mr. Peabody & Sherman Show
- Dawn of the Croods

=== 2017 ===
- Voltron: Legendary Defender
- Home: Adventures with Tip & Oh
- Spirit Riding Free

=== 2018 ===
- Trollhunters: Tales of Arcadia (following expiration of Netflix first-window)
- Trolls: The Beat Goes On!

=== 2019 ===
- The Adventures of Rocky and Bullwinkle
- American Ninja Warrior Junior (seasons 1-2)

=== 2020 ===
- Kung Fu Panda: The Paws of Destiny
- Where's Waldo?

=== 2021 ===
- The Boss Baby: Back in Business (season 1, following expiration of Netflix first-window)
- Harvey Girls Forever! (following expiration of Netflix first-window)
- The Epic Tales of Captain Underpants (season 1, following expiration of Netflix first-window)
- 3Below: Tales of Arcadia (following expiration of Netflix first-window)
- Madagascar: A Little Wild

=== 2022 ===
- Cleopatra in Space
- Powerbirds
- The Mighty Ones

=== 2023 ===
- Abominable and the Invisible City
- Kung Fu Panda: The Dragon Knight
- DreamWorks Dragons: The Nine Realms
