= Puzzle Axe =

2013 video game

- Developer: Secret Igloo
- Publisher: Secret Igloo
- Platforms: Android, iOS
- Genre: Adventure
- Mode: Single-player

Puzzle Axe is a 2013 adventure game developed and published by Secret Igloo. The game uses a jigsaw-puzzle format and integrates a variety of enigmas and unusual plot elements. In addition, a story in the form of animated videos, narrated in English by Rick Jones, comes after each level.

The story takes place in a weird kingdom called Puzzle Axe, where two magical axes were crafted for the royal family. The time has now come for the king to choose his successor among his two sons. But, not happy about it, one of the brothers steals an axe and escapes to sow disorder in the realm. The fate of the universe, therefore, rests in the hands of the other brother who has to save it!

Puzzle Axe uses the presence of moving pieces inside the puzzles. It also presents several game mechanics such as mazes, gravity, secret codes, and more. The animated sequences total over 10 minutes of adventure.
