= Trulli Tales =

Animated children's television series

- Official logo featuring the main characters. From left to right: Sun, Ring, Stella, and Zip.
- Also known as: Trulli Tales: The Adventures of Trullalleri
- Genre: Fantasy; Comedy; Action-Adventure
- Created by: Maria Elena Congedo; Fiorella Congedo
- Based on: Truli Style by Congedo Editore
- Directed by: Eric Gosselet
- Voices of: Eleanor Noble; Sonja Ball; Holly Gauthier-Frankel; Richard Dumont; Jennifer Seguin
- Theme music composer: Alessandro Boriani
- Opening theme: "Trulli Tales" by Sonja Ball, Angela Galuppo, and Eleanor Noble
- Ending theme: "Trulli Tales" (instrumental)
- Composers: Alessandro Boriani; Fiorella Congedo; Maria Elena Congedo
- Countries of origin: Italy; France; United Kingdom; Canada; Brazil
- Original languages: Italian; French; English; Portuguese
- No. of seasons: 2
- No. of episodes: 104

Production
- Executive producers: Nicolas Atlan; Fiorella Congedo; Maria Elena Congedo; Domenico Procacci; François Trudel; Vincent Leroux; Michael G. Stern
- Producers: Marc Dhrami; Stefano Basso; François Trudel; Annita Romanelli
- Running time: 11 minutes
- Production companies: Fandango TV; Congedo CulturArte; Gaumont Animation; PVP Media; Rai Fiction

Original release
- Network: Rai Yoyo and Disney Junior (Italy); Disney Junior and Télétoon+ (France); Disney Junior and Tiny Pop (UK & Ireland); Ici Radio-Canada Télé and Knowledge Kids (Canada); Gloobinho (Brasil)
- Release: 17 October 2017 – 14 February 2022

Trulli Tales (/truːliːɛ/), fully known as Trulli Tales: The Adventures of Trullalleri, is an animated children's television series created by Maria Elena and Fiorella Congedo. The series first aired on 17 October 2017 on Gloobinho in Brazil. The series was produced by Fandango TV, Congedo CulturArte, Gaumont Animation, PVP Media (formerly Groupe PVP), and Rai Fiction with the participation of the Canada Media Fund, the collaboration of Radio-Canada and produced in association with The Walt Disney Company EMEA.

Set in the fictional world of Trullalleri or Trulliland (which is meant to resemble Alberobello), the series revolves around four children and one teacher who learn how to cook from their Grandma Trulli's cookbook from the past. But when Copperpot tries to steal it, the four children; Ring, Zip, Stella, and Sun, must stop him with the magical power from their wands.

== Characters ==
=== Main ===
- Sun (voiced by Holly Gauthier-Frankel) is the first of the group's class. She is very determined, intelligent, tomboyish and brilliant, but can be touchy and stubborn. She takes care of cooking the dishes in the group. Her wand is a spoon, which she uses to control temperatures. She has blonde hair and blue eyes and is dressed in pink.
- Ring (voiced by Eleanor Noble) is the talented leader of the group. He is a generous and kind friend, but can also be a little self-confident and vain. He is good at cooking and is the one in the group who selects the ingredients for each recipe. His wand is a fork and also a magnet, which is able to attract objects. He has brown hair, dark eyes, and is dressed in red.
- Zip (voiced by Sonja Ball) is the sportsman of the group. He is nice and funny, but sometimes he proves to be moody and impatient. He deals with mincing, blending, and cutting the ingredients selected by Ring. His wand is a kitchen whisk that can create wind. He has orange hair and green eyes, and is dressed in blue.
- Stella (voiced by Sonja Ball) is the most vaporous of the group. Although she can be inattentive, distracted, careless, childish, and naive, she is good-natured, kind, sensitive, polite, and sweet. She is talented in decorating, as shown by her ability to decorate the dishes. Her wand is a spatula that she uses to decorate the food made by her and her friends. She has brown hair, brown eyes, and is dressed in yellow.
- Miss Frisella (voiced by Eleanor Noble) is the owner of the Trulli Kingdom bakery and keeper of the Magic Cookbook. In Season 2, she also has the alias of Trullifairy.
- Trulli Grandma (voiced by Sonja Ball) is the creator of the Magic Cookbook and would guide the kids through riddles that would help them solve any of their problems.

=== Villains ===
- Copperpot (voiced by Richard M. Dumont) is the main villain who always tries to steal the Magic cookbook. He would always brag about being a genius. It is revealed in I Want to Bread Free that he wants the Magic Cookbook to free his ancestor Copperpan who is trapped inside.
- Athenina (voiced by Jennifer Seguin) is Copperpot's pet owl.
- Poppy is Copperpot's nephew who was introduced in Season 2.

=== Recurring ===
- Terry and Lu (voiced by Sonja Ball and Angela Galuppo) are a spider and snail that appear at the beginning and end of every episode.
- Trulli King (voiced by Terrence Scammell) is the ruler of Trulliland who has a collection of Donkey antiques

== Production ==
Trulli Tales is produced by Fandango TV, Congedo CulturArte, and Rai Fiction in Italy, Gaumont Animation in France, and PVP MEDIA in Canada. Gaumont and PVP formed a co-production agreement for this series, alongside Belle and Sebastian in 2015. The series was inspired by a book published by Congedo.

The show was commissioned by The Walt Disney Company for its Disney Junior channels in the EMEA regions, alongside Rai Fiction for Rai YoYo in Italy, Ici Radio-Canada Télé in Canada, and Globosat's Gloobinho in Brazil. The series is distributed by Boat Rocker Media for consumer products in the United Kingdom, seasons 1 and 2 worldwide by Gaumont and season 1 in Canada by PVP Distribution.

== Episodes ==
Every episode of the series was directed by Eric Gosselet.

=== Season 1 ===
No.	Title	Written by	Storyboard by	Italian air date	U.S. air date	Prod. code
Disney Junior
1	"Humble Pie"	Maria Elena & Fiorella Congedo	Eric Gosselet	11 December 2017	12 October 2019	101
Sun wanted to grow the biggest tomatoes in the world!
2	"The Victorious Pound Cake"	Nicolas Chrétien	Olivier Daube	12 December 2017	12 October 2019	102
The Wizard Chefs were arguing over who was the best chef.
3	"Princess for a Day"	Thomas LaPierre	Olivier Ducrest	13 December 2017	19 October 2019	114
Sun was bossing everyone around while acting like a princess.
4	"The Curiosity Banana Souffle"	Jean-Christophe Hervé & Cèdric Perrin	Morade Rahni	14 December 2017	14 December 2019	116
Zip was being annoying to Stella by constantly asking what she was hiding, even though it was none of his business.
5	"Perfume for Miss Frisella"	Paul Stoica & Alex Riendeau	Olivier Ducrest	15 December 2017	30 November 2019	115
Zip had used the wrong ingredient for perfume.
6	"Sincere Stromboli"	Thomas LaPierre	Alberto Alvoni	16 December 2017	10 January 2020	130
Stella was lying to Sun about how her zesty olives tasted.
7	"A Genie's Plan"	T. J. Stehly & Eric Gosselet	Amélie Sakelaris	17 December 2017	10 February 2020	132
A genie decided to take over the world.
8	"Sun's Lost Notebook"	Paul Stoica & Alex Riendeau	Morade Rahni	18 December 2017	28 December 2019	120
Stella "accidentally" knocked ink all over Sun’s notebook which caused Sun to cut all ties with her for good!
9	"Big Bad Breath"	T. J. Stehly	Gaspard Sumeire	19 December 2017	26 October 2019	105
Ring was being too overconfident that he got the wrong ingredient!
10	"Friendship Tea"	Maria Elena & Fiorella Congedo	Fabio Idali	20 December 2017	30 November 2019	113
Sun was too certain that she could handle all of the jobs by herself.
11	"Whack-A-Hole"	Thomas LaPierre	Yani Ouabdesselam	21 December 2017	9 January 2020	129
Zip was too focused on his luck that he forgot what practice meant.
12	"Brave Fruit Salad"	Thomas LaPierre	Gaspard Sumeire	22 December 2017	21 December 2019	118
Sun was too scared of ants.
13	"Coppercat"	Paul Stoica & Alex Riendeau	Nicolas Livet	3 March 2018	7 January 2020	124
Zip was too lazy to finish his work on time.
14	"Kingly Cake"	Maria Elena & Fiorella Congedo	Nicolas Livet	4 March 2018	23 November 2019	112
Ring was taking this way too seriously over hazelnuts.
15	"Patient Pudding"	Maria Elena & Fiorella Congedo	Alexej Kazanov	10 March 2018	5 October 2019	104
Zip wanted to get to the tournament so bad.
16	"Dragonina"	Diane Morel & Françoise Boublil	Morade Rahni	11 March 2018	2 November 2019	109
Ring was clueless because he didn't know which one to choose.
17	"Phantom Pumpkin Cake"	Thomas LaPierre	Nicolas Livet	17 March 2018	19 October 2019	107
Zip was annoying everyone with his stupid pranks on Halloween.
18	"Don't Waste Food"	Eddy Fluchon & Philippe Naas	Davide Veca	18 March 2018	10 January 2020	131
Stella was wasting stuff all because they were used.
19	"Hero by Mistake"	Thomas LaPierre	Daniel Pocette & Morade Rahni	24 March 2018	14 December 2019	117
Zip falsely claimed to be the "hero" which was only an accident.
20	"S.O.S. Milkshake"	Nicolas Chrètien	Gaspard Sumeire	25 March 2018	26 October 2019	106
Ring was too scared of the dark that he got the wrong ingredient for the king, which was...BLACK PEPPER!
21	"A Sticky Situation"	Paul Stoica & Alex Riendeau	Fabio Idali	31 March 2018	21 December 2019	119
Stella was goofing off instead of helping.
22	"Pizzica"	Johan Chiron	Fabio Idali	1 April 2018	2 November 2019	110
Zip refused to dance with his friends because he sucked at dancing.
23	"Treasure Omelet"	Maria Elena & Fiorella Congedo	Alberto Alvoni	7 April 2018	8 January 2020	126
Zip was being replaced by Nino.
24	"Babble Apple"	Héloise Capoccia	Davide Veca	8 April 2018	23 November 2019	111
Ring and Sun were arguing over an apple project recipe.
25	"Wise Margherita Pizza"	Thomas LaPierre	Jason Khober	14 April 2018	13 February 2020	139
Zip’s muscles were too strong while cooking pizza that it broke everybody’s teeth!
26	"Beards for One, Beards for All"	Paul Stoica & Alex Riendeau	Morade Rahni	15 April 2018	7 January 2020	125
Copperpot was spreading beard potion to make everyone think random people were him.
27	"Crazy Carrot Muffins"	Thomas LaPierre	Yani Ouabdesselam	21 April 2018	6 January 2020	123
Stella was being so picky over carrots.
28	"False Alarm"	Jean-Christophe Hervé & Cédric Perrin	Alexej Kazanov	22 April 2018	6 January 2020	122
Zip was annoying everybody with his unfunny pranks.
Rai YoYo
29	"Sorbet on Ice"	Nicolas Chrétien	Alexej Kazanov	16 June 2018	7 December 2019	108
Sun found herself to be a lost cause because she couldn't do skating and her wand was malfunctioning.
30	"Gingerbread Castle"	Maria Elena & Fiorella Congedo	Yani Ouabdesselam	17 June 2018	7 December 2019	137
Stella was being a blabbermouth by revealing Zip's secret about keeping the pet in the bakery.
31	"Pie of Truth"	Maria Elena & Fiorella Congedo	Davide Veca	2 July 2018	5 October 2019	103
Zip was lying too much about his wand in his pocket/backpack.
32	"Clock-A-Doodle-Doo"	Paul Stoica & Alex Riendeau	Fabio Idali	11 July 2018	28 December 2019	121
The 3 Wizard Chefs were blaming Sun for being late which wasn't that big a deal.
33	"Kaboom Cake"	Paul Stoica & Alex Riendeau	Morade Rahni	14 July 2018	8 January 2020	127
Stella wanted to make her cake the best in the world without any strange flavours that are not suitable for it.
34	"Oscar's Nose"	Paul Stoica & Alex Riendeau	Jason Khober	14 July 2018	9 January 2020	128
Sun didn't trust Oscar all because he was "too distracted by smells", not knowing his scent IS useful.
35	"The New Kid in Class"	Paul Stoica & Alex Riendeau	Nicolas Livet	17 July 2018	10 February 2020	133
Sun was so obliviously naive that she couldn't see the "new student's" true colours.
36	"Mega Giga Burger"	T. J. Stehly	Thierry Beureq	17 July 2018	11 February 2020	134
Zip had now become only interested in cheeseburgers so much that he now only wanted to eat cheeseburgers and nothing else, not even eggplants.
37	"A Trulli Fairy Emergency"	Maria Elena & Fiorella Congedo	Davide Veca	18 July 2018	11 February 2020	135
Sun turned Stella's ideas of licorice down.
38	"The Royal Ball"	T. J. Stehly	Jason Khober	19 July 2018	12 February 2020	138
Stella was too focused on her dress.
39	"Oil of Fame"	Maria Elena & Fiorella Congedo	Nicolas Livet	20 July 2018	13 February 2020	140
Ring let the idea of becoming famous for his so-called "special oil" get to his head so bad that he doesn't realise what was more important.
40	"The Rabbit Affair"	T. J. Stehly	Meredith Calzoni	21 July 2018	12 May 2020	142
Ring broke the king's promise by freeing the rabbit and feeding him celery after being specifically told not to.
41	"Olympiads"	T. J. Stehly	Yani Ouabdesselam	18 July 2018	12 February 2020	136
Ring cheated at the olympiads.
42	"Mousey"	Thomas LaPierre	Morade Rahni	22 July 2018	12 April 2020	143
Sun found a toy mouse, even though it belonged to Stella.
43	"Guilty Gressini"	Thomas LaPierre	Alberto Alvoni	22 July 2018	12 April 2020	144
Stella framed Zip for something he didn't do.
44	"Copperfly"	Patrick Courval & Alex Riendeau	Michelle Ku	23 July 2018	11 May 2020	145
Copperpot (now a butterfly) tried to steal the Magic Cookbook, AGAIN!
45	"The King's Donkey"	Patrick Courval & Alex Riendeau	Davide Veca	23 July 2018	11 May 2020	146
Zip stole the king’s donkey without permission.
46	"Stella's Ribbon"	Maria Elena & Fiorella Congedo	Alberto Alvoni	24 July 2018	13 May 2020	147
Stella was too focused on other stuff rather than her ribbon.
47	"Tarallini's Day"	Maria Elena & Fiorella Congedo	Meredith Calzoni	24 July 2018	13 May 2020	148
Zip wanted to copy Ring's persona.
48	"Cloudy with a Chance of Onions"	T. J. Stehly	Michelle Ku	25 July 2018	14 May 2020	149
Zip acted like it was the end of the world over losing a small game.
49	"New Oil Day"	Maria Elena & Fiorella Congedo	Meredith Calzoni	25 July 2018	14 May 2020	150
Stella was being so disorganised.
50	"Surprising Pea Soup"	Maria Elena & Fiorella Congedo	Meredith Calzoni	9 February 2019	12 May 2020	141
Sun was so picky over peas.
51	"I Want to Bread Free"	T.J. Stehly	Patrick George	14 February 2019	19 April 2020	151
52	"I Want to Bread Free"	T.J. Stehly	Patrick George	14 February 2019	19 April 2020	152
The Wizard Chefs had to stop Copperpot from freeing his horrible ancestor before it was too late.

== Broadcast ==
Trulli Tales aired 17 October 2017 on Gloobinho in Brazil. The series aired on 11 December 2017 on Disney Junior in Italy, and later 11 June 2018 on Rai YoYo. In Canada, the series aired on Ici Radio-Canada Télé on 6 January 2018, and on Knowledge Network on 7 May 2018.

On 11 December 2017, the series aired across many Disney Junior channels in the EMEA area, including France and the UK and Ireland. The series also aired in the latter on Tiny Pop on 21 January 2019. In South Africa, the series aired on 26 February 2018. In Singapore, the series aired on Channel 5 on 15 July 2019. From 25 September 2019 until 6 September 2021, the series was available on the Noggin streaming service. On 5 October 2019, the series aired on the Nick Jr. Channel in the United States. As of November 2019, the series had been sold to 177 territories globally.

== Awards ==
Trulli Tales was awarded the Prix Gémeaux for best animated series in 2018. In 2019, it became the first television series to win the Italian Creativity Award from the Istituto Italiano di Cultura in the United States.

== Merchandise ==
Giochi Preziosi launched a series of toys for the series in 2018, which were distributed in Italy and the United Kingdom. Additional merchandise was produced for Italian release, including educational toys, tissues, stickers, and food products. Panini began publishing an official magazine in November 2019.
