= Gaumont Animation =

French animation studio

- Logo used since 2026
- Formerly: Alphanim (1997–2008); Gaumont Alphanim (2008–2011)
- Type: Subsidiary
- Industry: Animation
- Founded: February 1997; 29 years ago
- Founder: Christian Davin
- Headquarters: Neuilly sur Seine, France
- Key people: Terry Kalagian (president)
- Products: Television series Feature films
- Parent: Gaumont (2008–present)
- Divisions: Gaumont Animation USA
- Website: gaumont.com/en/animation

Gaumont Animation (formerly known as Alphanim and Gaumont Alphanim) is a French animation studio owned by Gaumont founded in February 1997 by Christian Davin. The company's animated catalog comprises over 800 half-hours, broadcast in over 130 countries.

Its productions include Mona the Vampire, Robotboy, Galactik Football, Calimero, Noddy, Toyland Detective (after the rights were acquired from DreamWorks Animation in 2013), Trulli Tales, Belle and Sebastian, Furiki Wheels, F is for Family, and Samurai Rabbit: The Usagi Chronicles. Film projects in development include Plunder and a musical adaptation of Paul McCartney's novel High in the Clouds.

== History ==
Christian Davin founded Alphanim in February 1997 after stepping down as president of France Animation. Its first production, Animal Crackers, a co-production with CINAR based on the comic strip by Roger Bollen, debuted in Canada in October of that year; and later in France, during September 1999.

In 2003, Alphanim and StudioCanal jointly established Alphanim Video to distribute Alphanim's catalogue on home media.

In November 2007, Gaumont launched its acquisition of Alphanim; the transaction closed in January 2008 for €25 million, marking Gaumont's return to television and animation production for the first time in eight years; it is an entry into English-language productions, after Gaumont Television was sold in 1999 and Gaumont Multimedia's assets were acquired in 2000 by Xilam.

In March 2013, the studio was rebranded as Gaumont Animation; it also announced its partnership with DreamWorks Animation for Noddy, Toyland Detective.

In March 2016, Nicolas Atlan joined the studio as president and named Terry Kalagian as VP of creative for animation.

In June 2023, Terry Kalagian was promoted to president of the studio. The same month, Gaumont signed a first-look deal with Studio 100, a Belgian company which will co-produce series with and distribute Gaumont Animation's catalogue worldwide.

== Productions ==
=== Series ===
#	Title	Creator(s) / Developer(s)	Year(s)	Co-production(s)	Network	Notes
1990s
1	Animal Crackers	Joseph Mallozzi	1997–00	CINAR; Gimages; Valor 4	Canada; Teletoon; France; La Cinquième	Based on the Animal Crackers comic strips by Roger Bollen
2	Ripley's Believe It or Not!: The Animated Series	—N/a	1999	CINAR; Gimages; Valor 4	France; France 3 Canada; Family Channel	Based on the Ripley's Believe It or Not! franchise created by Robert Ripley
3	Redwall	Brian Jacques; Steve Roberts	1999	Nelvana Limited; Molitor Productions; Sofica Valor 4 Gimages 2 United Productions	Canada; Teletoon; France; France 2 France 3 Germany; KI.KA	Based on the Redwall books by Brian Jacques. S1 only
4	Mona the Vampire	Adam Kempton; Ian Lewis; Pierre Colin Thibert	1999–2006	CINAR; Farnham Film Company; Animation Services (S3)	Canada; YTV; France; France 3 Canal J Tiji (S3–4)	Based on the Mona the Vampire books by Sonia Holleyman and Hyawin Oram
2000s
5	The Baskervilles	Alastair Swinnerton; Nick Martinelli	2000	CINAR; Carlton Television; Blue Nose Productions	Canada; Teletoon; France; France 2 United Kingdom; ITV (CITV)	
6	X-DuckX	Jan Van Rijsselberge	2001–02	Telepool; Soficanim; Young Distribution; Point Production; Tooncan Productions, Inc. (S2)	Canada; Teletoon; France; France 3 Fox Kids; Jetix	
7	Spaced Out	Claude Lerist; Léon Nöel	2002	Tooncan Productions, Inc. Animation Enterprises; Sofica Gimages 2	Canada; Vrak.TV; France; Canal+ France 3 Europe; Cartoon Network; United States; Toon Disney	
8	Ralf the Record Rat	Jan Van Rijsselberge	2003	Ocean Sound Studios Ltd; Agogo Media	Canada; YTV; Vrak.TV; France; Canal J	Based on the Ralf the Record Rat comic strip by Jan Van Rijsselberge
9	Cosmic Cowboys	Eddy Marx	2003	Tooncan Productions VI Inc. Europool; Rai Fiction; Agogo Media; Gruppo Alcuni; LuxAnimation; Sofica France Télévision Images 2	Canada; Vrak.TV; France; France 3 Italy; RAI; Germany; WDR	
10	Pet Pals	Sergio Manfio; Francesco Manfio	2003	Rai Fiction; Gruppo Alcuni; Agogo Media	Rai 2	Season 1
11	Potatoes and Dragons	Jan Van Rijsselberge	2004	Cookie Jar Entertainment; DQ Entertainment; LuxAnimation; Europool	Canada; Teletoon; France; Canal J France 3	
12	Creepschool	Torbjörn Jansson; Happy Life; Stina Mansfield; Per Carlsson; Han Östlundh	2004	Cookie Jar Entertainment; Happy Life; EM.TV & Merchandising AG; Agogo Media; LuxAnimation	Canada; Teletoon; Télétoon; France; France 3 Germany; ZDF; Portugal; RTP2	
13	Franklin	—N/a	2004	Nelvana Limited; Big Bang Digital Studios; LuxAnimation	Canada; Treehouse TV; France; TF1	Based on the Franklin the Turtle books by Paulette Bourgeois and Brenda Clark; S6 only
14	Delta State	—N/a	2004	Nelvana Limited; Deltanim Productions Inc. DQ Entertainment; LuxAnimation; Cofinova 13	Canada; Teletoon; France; France 2 Canal+	Based on The Delta State comic book by Douglas Gayeton and Matt Rockman; first teen-oriented production
15	Woofy	Alexandre Révérend	2004	Tooncan Productions XXV Inc. Fantasia; Cofinova 1	France 5	
16	Zombie Hotel	Jan Van Rijsselberge	2005	Telegael Teoranta; Magma Films; LuxAnimation; Hosem Animation	France; France 3 Ireland; TG4 (Cúla 4)	
17	Cooking? Child's Play!	—N/a	2005	CCA; LuxAnimation; SEK Animation Studio; The Farm II	Tiji	Based on the La cuisine est un jeu d'enfants books by Michel Oliver
18	Robotboy	Jan Van Rijsselberge	2005–08	LuxAnimation (S1); Cofinova 1 (S1)	France; France 3 United Kingdom; Cartoon Network	
19	Galactik Football	Augias Imaginaction	2006–11	Audi'Art; Welkin (S1); Hosem Animation (S1); LuxAnimation (S1); Supersonic (S1); Carloon (S2); Europool (S2–3); Telegael Teoranta (S3); DQ Entertainment (S3)	Europe; Jetix (S1–2); Disney XD (S3); France; France 2 (S1–2); Gulli (S3)	Produced as Alphanim in S1–2 and as Gaumont-Alphanim in S3
20	SantApprentice	Jan Van Rijsselberge	2006	Europool; Startrack Ltd. Hosem Animation; Village Productions	France; France 5 Tiji; Germany; Super RTL	
21	Zap Junior High	—N/a	2007	Cofinova 3 Jiang Toon Animation	M6; Canal J	Based on the Zap Junior High comic book by Tehem and Gildo
22	Hairy Scary	Jan Van Rijsselberge	2007	Europool; Shanghai Cartoon Communication Group; Village Productions	France; France 3 Germany; Super RTL	
23	Matt's Monsters	Jan Van Rijsselberge	2008	Rai Fiction; Lanterna Magica; Europool; Jiang Toon Animation; Sonicville; Cofinova 4 SND	France; M6; Italy; Rai 2 Rai Gulp; Germany; KiKa; Spain; Antena 3 Disney Channel; Clan	
24	Toto Trouble	—N/a	2009	Europool; Jiang Toon Animation; SND; Village Productions	M6	Based on the Toto Trouble comic book by Thierry Coppée
25	Gawayn	Jan Van Rijsselberge; Peter Saisselin	2009–13	Jiang Toon Animation; Mondo TV (S1); Muse Entertainment (S2); Eurovision Animation (S2); Ben & Saatchi (S2)	France; France 3 (S1); France 4 (S1); Boomerang; Rai 3 (S1); Canal+ Family (S2); Gulli (S2) Spain; La 2 Clan	Produced as Gaumont Alphanim in S1 and as Alphanim in S2
26	Mouss & Boubidi	Baptiste Lucas; Frédéric Martin	2009	Oasis Animation; Europool	France 3	
2010s
27	The Mysteries of Alfred Hedgehog	Mary Mackay-Smith; Merilyn Read	2010	Muse Entertainment; Prickly Productions; Europool; Jiang Toon Animation	Canada; TVO; TFO; Knowledge Network; Radio-Canada Télévision; France; France 5 United States; Qubo Channel	
28	The Small Giant	Jan Van Rijsselberge	2010	Cofinova 5 Europool; Jiang Toon Animation; Village Productions	China; CCTV; France; France 5 Gulli	
29	Pok & Mok	Isabelle Lenoble; Érik Zilliox	2011	Vivement Lundi! Europool; A Plus Image 2 Feitong Animation	Canal+	
30	The Green Squad	—N/a	2011	Europool; Cofinova 6 Shanghai Supercolor Technology	France 5	Based on the Les Sauvenature comic book by Jean-Marie Defossez and Fabien Mense
31	Dude, That's My Ghost!	Jan Van Rijsselberge	2013	Snipple Animation; Cofanim; Backup Films	Canada; BBC Kids; France; Orange Cinema Series; United Kingdom; Disney XD	
32	Lanfeust Quest	—N/a	2013–14	Gaumont Television; DQ Entertainment; Cofinova 23; Devanim; Backup Media; Dapaco Productions	M6; Canal J	Based on the Lanfeust Quest comic book by Christophe Arleston, Didier Tarquin, and Ludo Lullabi
33	Calimero	—N/a	2013–16	Gaumont Television; Studio Campedelli; Kodansha; Rai Fiction; Telepool; Global Digital Creations Holdings Ltd.	Canada; Télé-Québec; France; TF1; Italy; RAI; Japan; TV Tokyo; Switzerland; RTS	Based on the Calimero characters created by Nino Pagot, Toni Pagot, and Ignazio Colnaghi
34	Welcome to Bric-a-Broc	Amandine Gallerand; Matthieu Chevalier	2015	Vivement Lundi! Cofinova 10; Cofinova 11	Belgium; Ketnet; France; Canal+ Family; Piwi+	
35	F is for Family	Bill Burr; Michael Price	2015–21	Wild West Television; Loner Productions; King of France Productions; Gaumont International Television	Netflix	First adult-oriented production
36	Noddy, Toyland Detective	Heath Kenny; Myles McLeod	2016–20	DreamWorks Animation Television	France; France 5 Piwi+ United Kingdom; Channel 5 United States; Universal Kids	Based on the Noddy characters created by Enid Blyton
37	Atomic Puppet	Mark Drop; Jerry Leibowitz; Travis Williams; John Derevlany; Brad Birch	2016–17	Mercury Filmworks; Technicolor	Canada; Teletoon; France; France 4 Worldwide; Disney XD	
38	Trulli Tales	Fiorella Congedo; Maria Elena Congedo	2017–19	Fandango TV; Congedo CulturArte; Groupe PVP; Rai Fiction	Canada; Ici Radio-Canada Télé; Knowledge Kids; Italy; Rai Yoyo; Disney Jr. France; Disney Jr.	
39	Furiki Wheels	Frédéric Martin	2017	Je Suis Bien Content	France; France 4 United Kingdom; Disney XD	
40	Belle and Sebastian	Jean-Phillipe Robin	2017	Groupe PVP	Canada; Ici Radio-Canada Télé; Knowledge Network; France; M6; Piwi+	Based on the Belle et Sébastien novel by Cécile Aubry
2020s
41	Stillwater	Rob Hoegee	2020–present	Scholastic Entertainment	Apple TV+	Based on the Zen books by Jon J. Muth
42	Nice, not nice	Franck Salomé; Fernando Worcel; Nicolas Sedel; Sandrine Acquistapace	2021	2 Minutes	Disney Channel; Disney Jr. Gulli; Nickelodeon Junior; Okoo; Piwi+ TF1	
43	Do, Re & Mi	Michael Scharf; Jackie Tohn	2021–22	Michael Made Me; Amazon Studios	Amazon Prime Video	
44	Bionic Max	Thomas Digard; Emmanuel Klotz	2021	—N/a	Gulli; Canal J	
45	Samurai Rabbit: The Usagi Chronicles	Doug Langdale; Candie Kelty Langdale	2022	Netflix Animation Studios; Atomic Monster; Dark Horse Entertainment	Netflix	Based on the Usagi Yojimbo comic book by Stan Sakai
46	Living Wild (ex Tiny Head)	Peter Saisselin Amy Serafin	2026	Enanimation; Toonz Media Group; Studio 100	France Télévisions; RAI; TV5 Monde	
Upcoming
47	Gilbert		2027	—N/a	TBA	Based on the Gilbert books by Alex Willan
48	Rocket Park	Amy Stephenson; Shane Langan	TBA	Scholastic Entertainment		Based on the You Are books by Margaret O'Hair and Sofia Cardoso about Sofia Sanchez
49	Ash	TBA		Bigchild Entertainment; Studio 100 Media		
50	Agent 9			—N/a		Based on the Agent 9 graphic novel by James Burke
51	Fortune Falls			Scholastic Entertainment		Based on the Fortune Falls book by Jenny Goebel
52	Snapdragon			—N/a		Based on the Snapdragon graphic novel by Kat Leyh
53	Jungle Book: Cub Club Adventures			Studio 100 International; I Josh Around		Based on The Jungle Book book by Rudyard Kipling

=== Films ===
#	Title	Release date	Director	Co-production with	Distributor	Note
2000s
1	Franklin and the Turtle Lake Treasure	September 6, 2006	Dominique Monféry	Les Studios DSO; Nelvana Limited; StudioCanal; Europool; LuxAnimation	Mars Distribution	Based on the Franklin the Turtle books by Paulette Bourgeois and Brenda Clark
2	Eleanor's Secret	December 16, 2009	Dominique Monféry	La Fabrique; Lanterna Magica	Haut et Court	
2010s
3	Santa's Apprentice	November 24, 2010	Luc Vinciguerra	Flying Bark Productions; Avrill Stark Entertainment; Cartoon Saloon	Gaumont	Based on the SantApprentice series by Jan Van Rijsselberge.
4	The Magic Snowflake	November 20, 2013	Luc Vinciguerra	Snipple Animation; DaCapo Productions; Telepool; Cofimage 23; Devanim-Backup Media	Gaumont	Based on the SantApprentice series by Jan Van Rijsselberge.
Upcoming
5	High in the Clouds	2027	Toby Genkel	MPL Communications; Unique Features	Gaumont	Based on the High in the Clouds book by Paul McCartney
6	Plunder	TBA	TBA	L'Atelier Animation	Gaumont	
