= X-DuckX =

- Genre: Comedy; Sports
- Created by: Jan Van Rijsselberge
- Written by: Nicolas Gallet; Pierre-Colin Thibert
- Voices of: Rick Jones; Julian Casey; Simon Peacock; Helen King; John Stocker
- Theme music composer: Dogstars & Deenice
- Composers: Dogstars & Deenice
- Countries of origin: France; Canada
- Original languages: English; French
- No. of seasons: 2
- No. of episodes: 78

Production
- Producers: Christian Davin; Clement Calvet; Marc Gabizon; Ha Young Cho; Tae-Seog Kim
- Running time: 7 minutes
- Production companies: Alphanim; Telepool; Soficanim; Young Distribution; Point Animation; Tooncan (season 2)

Original release
- Network: France 3/Fox Kids/Jetix (France); Teletoon (Canada)
- Release: September 5, 2001 – 2006

X-DuckX (French: Canards extrêmes) is an animated television series, lasting 78 episodes, created by Jan Van Rijsselberge, directed by François Reczulski, and produced in 2001 by Alphanim, France 3 and Tooncan Productions, Inc. (season 2).

The series chronicles the wacky and dangerous adventures of a duo of ducks, Slax and Geextah, extreme sports fans. Both live as their passion, extreme adventures sometimes push them beyond their limits. In France, the series was first broadcast on France 3 in 2002 before being broadcast on Jetix (formerly Fox Kids) from 2004 to 2007. The show also aired on Super RTL in Germany.

== Characters ==
- Slax
  - Slax, unlike his friend Geextah is very awkward. He often told his friend-against whatever the topic between them. The ducks love to innovate in sports and sometimes invent some cars and artillery to be on top of extreme. Slax is a little emotional but very jealous; For example, in one episode, a character named Romumu visits the ducks when Slax wins a TV competition, but he puts his friend aside and plays endlessly with Romumu.
- Geextah
  - Geextah is the little hot head and the head of the duo. He is highly emotional, very suspicious but a little more "clever" than his friend. The only common, he and Slax share, are the passion for extreme sports and feelings for their girlfriend Arielle. He also likes thrash metal music, as well as cheeseburgers. Geextah himself is a "terror"; for example, in an episode in which he stamps a car with his caravan, he explains that "nobody raced Geextah terror."
- Arielle
  - Arielle is the ducks' best and only friend. She is blonde, and, unlike Slax and Geextah, prefers less violent sports; in some episodes, she tries to show that the ducks' sports she practices are better, but without success. Arielle is also a victim of fashion.
- J.T. Thrash
  - Thrash is the ducks' worst enemy. He is blond and pretty well-built. Thrash is still competing in extreme sports with Slax and Geextah but they can absolutely not become the sack. He is confident, spiteful and spends all the time getting his revenge against the duo because he is still second on the podium.

== Voice cast ==
=== French ===
- Philippe Allard - Slax
- David Pion - Geextah
- Olivier Cuvelier - Additional voices
- Nessym Guetat - Additional voices

=== English ===
- Rick Jones - Slax
- Julian Casey - Geextah
- Simon Peacock - Additional voices
- Helen King - Additional voices
- John Stocker - Additional voices

== Episodes ==
=== Season 1 ===
| No. | Title | Written by | Storyboard by |
|---|---|---|---|
| 1 | "One Lucky Duck" | Tom K. Mason and Dan Danko | Thierry Beurcq |
| 2 | "Weight and See" | Tom K. Mason and Dan Danko | Thierry Beurcq |
| 3 | "Exhibit Day" | Tom K. Mason, Dan Danko and Jean-Louis Capron | François Reczulski |
| 4 | "Slagerade" | Cliff MacGillivray and Jean-Louis Capron | François Reczulski |
| 5 | "Catch a Falling Star" | Tom K. Mason, Dan Danko and Jean-Louis Capron | Thierry Beurcq |
| 6 | "Deep Sheep" | Kim Segal and Jean-Louis Capron | François Reczulski |
| 7 | "Statue Nuts" | Tony Barnes and Jean-Louis Capron | François Reczulski |
| 8 | "Off the Record" | Jean-Louis Capron, Tom K. Mason and Dan Danko | François Reczulski |
| 9 | "What a Drag!" | Jeremy Winkles, Danny DiTata and Jean-Louis Capron | Chan Dwitch |
| 10 | "Game Showdown" | Daniel Baldassi, Jean-Louis Capron and François Boisivon | Frédéric Mintoff |
| 11 | "Pond Scum" | Jeremy Winkels, Danny DiTata, Jean-Louis Capron and François Boisivon | François Reczulski |
| 12 | "Home Sweet Home" | Cliff MacGillivray, Jean-Louis Capron and François Boisivon | Christophe Huthwohl and Fréderic Mintoff |
| 13 | "Extreme 9000" | Jean-Louis Capron and Daniel Baldassi | Jean-Baptiste Cleyet |
| 14 | "To Serve Duck" | Jean-Louis Capron, Tom K. Mason and Dan Danko | François Reczulski |
| 15 | "Master Skater" | Jean-Louis Capron | Patrick Michel |
| 16 | "Haunted Duck" | Jean-Louis Capron, Jeremy Winkles and Danny DiTata | Frédéric Mintoff |
| 17 | "Eggs Travaganza" | Jean-Louis Capron, Tom K. Mason, Dan Danko and François Boisivon | Thierry Beurcq |
| 18 | "Starving Stars" | Jean-Louis Capron | François Reczulski and Frédéric Mintoff |
| 19 | "Whitch Race" | Jean-Louis Capron | Laurent Delion |
| 20 | "Vidiots" | Jean-Louis Capron | Patrick Michel |
| 21 | "Censor This" | Jean-Louis Capron | Jean-Baptiste Cleyet |
| 22 | "Paperwork Island" | Jean-Louis Capron | Frédéric Mintoff |
| 23 | "Power, My Friend" | Jean-Louis Capron | Ludovic Hell |
| 24 | "X-Mas DuckX" | Jean-Louis Capron | François Reczulski |
| 25 | "The Far Away Farm" | Jean-Louis Capron | François Reczulski |
| 26 | "Whizz Ducks" | Jean-Louis Capron | Thierry Beurcq |
| 27 | "Smile, Nessie" | Jean-Louis Capron | Frédéric Mintoff |
| 28 | "Tennis Tenors" | Jean-Louis Capron | Gilles Dayez |
| 29 | "Geextah Cheats Cheeta" | Jean-Louis Capron | Frédéric Mintoff |
| 30 | "Ducky DuckX" | Jean-Louis Capron | Laurent Delion |
| 31 | "Restless Place" | Jean-Louis Capron | Patrick Michel |
| 32 | "Hat-Crazed" | Jean-Louis Capron | Thierry Beurcq |
| 33 | "Extreme Awards" | Jean-Louis Capron | Gilles Dayez |
| 34 | "TransfoduckX" | Jean-Louis Capron | Frédéric Mintoff |
| 35 | "Toyland" | Jean-Louis Capron | François Reczulski |
| 36 | "We Want Candy" | Jean-Louis Capron | Christophe Ollivier |
| 37 | "Extreme Vacation" | Jean-Louis Capron | Patrick Michel |
| 38 | "Trojan Cockroaches" | Jean-Louis Capron | Patrick Michel |
| 39 | "Bullfight" | Jean-Louis Capron | Franck Guillou |
