= The Smoggies =

1989 animated children's television show

- Created by: Colin Thibert; Gerald Potterton
- Developed by: CINAR
- Voices of: Teddy Lee Dillon; Brian Dooley; Richard M. Dumont; Karen Marginson; Walter Massey; Stephanie Morgenstern; Joan Orenstein; Rick Jones; Bronwen Mantel; Terrence Scammell; Harvey Berger; Pier Paquette
- Theme music composer: Joe Raposo
- Opening theme: "Smoggies and Suntots"
- Ending theme: "Smoggies and Suntots" (instrumental)
- Composer: Judy Henderson
- Countries of origin: Canada; France
- No. of episodes: 52

Production
- Executive producers: Micheline Charest; Jean Cazès
- Producers: Ronald A. Weinberg; Lila Cazès
- Running time: 22 minutes
- Production companies: CINAR Films; Initial Audiovisuel

Original release
- Network: Global Television Network (Canada); Antenne 2 (France); Canal+ (France)
- Release: 2 September 1989 – 25 February 1990

The Smoggies is a 1989–1990 animated children's television show created by Colin Thibert and Gerald Potterton and produced by CINAR Films in co-production with Initial Audiovisuel.

== Plot ==
The show took place on or around the fictional Coral Island, and revolved around a group of island-dwelling people called the Suntots and a trio of polluting treasure hunters called the Smoggies. The Suntots spent much of their time defending their island paradise from the Smoggies, who polluted everything around them and lived on a coal-fired steam ship, the SS Stinky Poo, which polluted the water and air around the island. The Smoggies constantly tried to destroy the Suntots' home for their own benefits.

Almost every episode had the environmentalist Suntots outsmarting the Smoggies' latest scheme, after which the Smoggies invariably hatched another scheme. Thus, the show also explains the importance of protecting the environment.

== Themes ==
A recurring theme was their attempt to steal the island's "magic coral" (which the Smoggies believed granted eternal youth), or find some alternative way to maintain youth. The show often implied that the magic coral did not actually exist. The corals were just manifestations of the Smoggies' (mainly Emma's) greed and vanity.

== Reruns ==
In 1994, the show was rerun on HBO and various local broadcast channels, such as Florida's WTMV32, in the United States under the name Stop the Smoggies. and in France, as SOS Polluards. In Quebec, it was aired under the name Touftoufs et Polluards. The show was broadcast in Ireland on RTÉ2 and in the United Kingdom on the BBC under its original Canadian title. It screened in New Zealand on afternoon television on TVNZ.

== Voice Cast ==
- Teddy Lee Dillon: Chip, Additional voices
- Brian Dooley: Additional voices
- Richard M. Dumont: Cool, Additional voices
- Karen Marginson: Miss Doctor, Little, Choosy, Cookie (voice 2), Additional voices
- Walter Massey: Polluto
- Stephanie Morgenstern: Princess Lila
- Joan Orenstein: Emma
- Rick Jones: Captain Clarence (voice 1), Uncle Boom (voice 1), Sport (voice 1), Scaredy (voice 1), Sailor (voice 1), Choo-Choo (voice 1), Tricks (voice 1)
- Bronwen Mantel: Cookie (voice 1), Additional voices
- Terrence Scammell: Speed (voice 1), Gardener (voice 1)
- Harvey Berger: Captain Clarence (voice 2), Uncle Boom (voice 2), Scaredy (voice 2), Sailor (voice 2), Choo-Choo (voice 2), Tricks (voice 2)
- Pier Paquette: Speed (voice 2), Gardener (voice 2), Sport (voice 2)

== Main characters ==
=== The Suntots ===
- Princess Lila: Somewhat taller than other Suntots, her body has more human-like dimensions, as opposed to the pudginess of her subjects. Her hairstyle is also entirely different from the other Suntots and she is the only one with red hair. The rest of the Suntots regard her as a leader. Emma considers her a thorn in her side, but Princess Lila keeps trying to convince Emma that the magic coral does not exist.
- Speed: Somewhat daring, outspoken and headstrong for a Suntot, his fast-swimming ability earned him his name. He is usually the one to think of a solution to the Suntots' problems. He has bright blue hair, and he and Princess Lila are often partners in their adventures of solving problems; they are the real heroes of the series.
- Chip: The brilliant orange-haired engineer for the Suntots. Chip invents and builds various things, using environmentally friendly methods. A bit quieter than Speed or Princess Lila, he often joins them on their adventures, but is more of a sidekick, as he rarely takes charge of a situation.
- Uncle Boom: The oldest Suntot and only one with white hair. He is the self-appointed mayor of Suntot Town. He makes speeches whenever he gets the chance, but is rather absent-minded and bungling.

=== The Smoggies ===
- Emma: The self-appointed leader of the Smoggies, she has a short temper and suffers from a gerascophobia. She is always trying to think of a scheme to get her way. She always bosses her two cohorts around, and is obsessed with finding the magic coral, thinking that that is what keeps the Suntots young. Polluto calls her "Miss Emma". She is also a bully and has no qualms about lying or being deceitful in getting her own way.
- Clarence: Emma's husband and the captain of a polluting coal fired ship called the Stinky-Poo. He is also an inventor and scientist, but his inventions rarely work the right way. Most of the time, he is spineless towards Emma and rarely temperamental, but he can get frustrated himself if things do not work out. Polluto calls him "the Captain" or "Captain Clarence."
- Polluto: Clarence's only crewmate. He is rather dimwitted, as Emma always points out, but he is the Smoggie with most of the practical skills. He runs the engine room (for some reason, he eats coal and drinks oil), and acts as cook, pilot, mechanic and custodian. He is often shown to have a warm heart, so his polluting tendencies are more related to ignorance and a desire to do his job. Sometimes he is friends with the Suntots but can just as quickly turn against them when ordered to chase them by Emma.

=== Supporting characters ===
- Other Suntots: Other recurring Suntots, besides Princess Lila, Speed, Chip and Uncle Boom, are minor or supporting characters, but most were the focus of one or more episodes. Each is named after one overbearing character trait (often related their job).
  - Sport: A yellow-haired all-around talented athlete who wears a sweatband and a number 8 shirt. He is also a bit of a show-off and occasionally acts before thinking. One episode he befriends a bird and ended up being kidnapped by the Smoggies and the Smoggies tied up Sport in a burlap sack. Later, Suntots rescue the bird and him.
  - Little: The youngest Suntot, with bluish-green hair. He is childish, playful, curious and short (even for a Suntot) and has a bit of an inferiority complex.
  - Cool: A laid-back hipster and musician who prefers to work on his songs than do other work. He has light blue hair and sunglasses, and is usually concerned as to whether something is "cool".
  - Miss Doctor: The Suntots' doctor, veterinarian and animal life expert. She is calm, logical, motherly and reserved, and has pale green hair and spectacles.
  - Gardener: The Suntots' resident plant life and farming expert. He has dark green hair and spends most of his time growing fruits and vegetables in his greenhouse or on his farm.
  - Cookie: She has pink hair, and all Suntots love anything she cooks. Her focus on her cooking sometimes makes her forget about other things.
  - Sailor: The Suntot who can sail a boat better than anyone. He has navy blue hair, a moustache, and speaks with stereotypical sailor slang and a thick accent.
  - Scaredy: The very easily frightened orange-haired Suntot. Deep down, however, he has hidden courage. He and Sport are best friends.
  - Choo-Choo: The orange-haired, sentimental driver of the steam locomotive "No. 9".
  - Tricks: The practical joker with orange hair who occasionally likes frightening Scaredy.
  - Choosy: The yellow-haired Suntot who can never make up her mind about anything.
  - Lumber: The Suntots' pink-haired forestry and conservation expert who can identify any kind of tree by its wood.
  - Hobo: Purple-haired Suntot who hates having baths. Apart from Sailor and Uncle Boom, he is the only other Suntot with facial hair.
  - Town Crier: The purple-haired Suntot whose only role is to say "Big meeting in the town square!"
- Turtle Tom: A sea turtle and a friend of the Suntots. He does not speak, but the top of his shell opens like a hatch so that Suntots can ride him above or below the water. He sometimes comes ashore if the Suntots need his strength to help move something.
- Pelican Pete: A pelican and another Suntot animal friend who provides air transportation when needed.
- Arnold: A great white shark with a friendly disposition. He sometimes helps the Suntots with transport and any tasks that require brute strength deep under water. Despite his pleasant nature, Polluto is terrified of him.
- Winston: A white sperm whale who communicates with sonar. His archenemy is a giant squid called Old One-Eye.
- Ralph Robin: Polluto's pet bird (who, in spite of his name is not a robin, but a yellow bird) who rides on Polluto's head and only speaks in warbles and squawks that Polluto seems able to understand.

== Episodes ==
The following dates represent the first US broadcasts.

Season 1, Episode 1

Aired: September 2, 1989 Leader of the Pack

The Smoggies turn a pack of whales against the Suntots. When the whales beach themselves, the Suntots come to the rescue.

Season 1, Episode 2

Aired: September 3, 1989 Don't Bug the Bugs

Emma's spraying of chemical pesticide backfires as the bugs grow to gigantic size.

Season 1, Episode 3

Aired: September 9, 1989 Hair-Raising Tale

Clarence empties a hair-remover into the Suntots water supply, causing all the Suntots to go bald.

Season 1, Episode 4

Aired: September 10, 1989 Size Isn't Everything

Clarence invents a growing potion to be used on Little, but Polluto uses it instead and turns into a giant.

Season 1, Episode 5

Aired: September 16, 1989 Double Talk

Another of Clarence's failed experiments results in Emma switching voices with whoever she hears.

Season 1, Episode 6

Aired: September 17, 1989 Coral Cup

The Smoggies enter the Coral Cup race, and attempt to sabotage the other boats so they can win.

Season 1, Episode 7

Aired: September 23, 1989 A Smoggie's Birthday

Clarence tries to harvest the fur from Cuddleups to make a fur coat for Emma.

Season 1, Episode 8

Aired: September 24, 1989 A Long Way from Home

The Suntots find a lost kiwi, and the Smoggies kidnap it and Sport because there's a map home in its backpack.

Season 1, Episode 9

Aired: September 30, 1989 Goodbye Engine Number Nine

President Boom decides to retire Engine No. 9 for the new Zoom Train, but it runs away out of control. The train tunnel caves in trapping the Smoggies alive.

Season 1, Episode 10

Aired: October 1, 1989 The Big Heat

Polluto turns up the Stinky Poo's boilers to maximum, causing the temperature on Coral Island to skyrocket.

Season 1, Episode 11

Aired: October 7, 1989 Emma's Green Thumb

Emma finds a rare flower that turns into a monster when planted in garbage.

Season 1, Episode 12

Aired: October 8, 1989 Which Is Witch

Emma pretends to be a witch and sends the Belching Fire Beast (Polluto in disguise) to set fire to the island.

Season 1, Episode 13

Aired: October 14, 1989 You Are What You Eat

Smoggies throw garbage into the sea, making Arnold the Shark sick and cranky.

Season 1, Episode 14

Aired: October 15, 1989 No Small Problem

Chemicals in the rain cause the Smoggies to shrink to tiny size.

Season 1, Episode 15

Aired: October 21, 1989 The Not-So-Freshman

Polluto tries going to the Suntots' Nature School, but misinterprets his assignments.

Season 1, Episode 16

Aired: October 22, 1989 Dr. Jekyll and Mister Polluto (also known as Polluto the Suntot)

Clarence creates a smart potion to be used on Polluto, but instead it inverts his personality and causes him to care about nature.

Season 1, Episode 17

Aired: October 28, 1989 Snow Show

The Smoggies find a baby dinosaur in the mountains, feed it a growing potion and make it rampage on Coral Island.

Season 1, Episode 18

Aired: October 29, 1989 The Sounds of Music

Cool makes a giant harp, but the vibrations from it cause damage. The Smoggies make an even bigger harp and threaten to destroy Suntot Town unless they get the Magic Coral.

Season 1, Episode 19

Aired: November 4, 1989 The Purple Tide

Clarence's shark repellent pollutes the ocean and causes everyone to sing and dance non-stop.

Season 1, Episode 20

Aired: November 5, 1989 Dust to Dust

The Smoggies harvest the clumpy grass on Coral Island to make a youth potion. But without the clumpy grass, the wind causes erosion.

Season 1, Episode 21

Aired: November 11, 1989 Zombies of Coral Island

Sweet Fruit Pies (made from contaminated fruit) cause the Suntots to turn into zombies and do whatever Emma says.

Season 1, Episode 22

Aired: November 12, 1989 Ripe for the Picking

Little gets sick, and the Suntots have to take some Sun Apples all the way around the island to ripen them so he can be cured.

Season 1, Episode 23

Aired: November 18, 1989 Under the Rainbow

The Suntots find a new kind of Rainbow Coral. Thinking it is the Magic Coral, Smoggies start harvesting it.

Season 1, Episode 24

Aired: November 19, 1989 Turtle Trauma

The turtles are due to lay their eggs on the Beach of the Whistling Sands. But Emma is feeling homesick, so Clarence builds her a replica city on the beach.

Season 1, Episode 25

Aired: November 25, 1989 Never Cry Wolf

Smoggies trick the Suntots into thinking Mt. Coral is about to erupt, hoping Princess Leela will take the Magic Coral with her when evacuating the town.

Season 1, Episode 26

Aired: November 26, 1989 Bubble Mania

Polluto likes blowing bubbles, so Clarence makes him a giant bubble machine. But these bubbles never pop, and endanger life on Coral Island...

Season 1, Episode 27

Aired: December 2, 1989 President Boom

The Suntots have an election for President of Coral Island. Emma also gets in the running.

Season 1, Episode 28

Aired: December 3, 1989 Salt Story

Clarence invents a machine to remove salt from sea water. But as the excess salt is dumped in Shark Bay, it endangers the wildlife.

Season 1, Episode 29

Aired: December 9, 1989 Bee's Business

Smoggies try to kidnap the bees on Coral Island so Emma can get the queen bee jelly.

Season 1, Episode 30

Aired: December 10, 1989 Tot Trap

The Smoggies trap all the Suntots at the beach, so they can look through Suntot Town for Magic Coral.

Season 1, Episode 31

Aired: December 16, 1989 Wild Blue Yonder

The Smoggies' refrigerator explodes making a hole in the Big Ozo. Aircraft get caught in an updraft and dangerous rays come through the hole from space.

Season 1, Episode 32

Aired: December 17, 1989 Off to the Races

Smoggies build a boat to enter the Suntot boat race. But the fumes from the boat poison the Suntots' fruit and Leela gets sick.

Season 1, Episode 33

Aired: December 23, 1989 Magic Muddle

Suntots have magic seeds that instantly grow trees. Meanwhile, Smoggies dam up the river to try to get the mud at the bottom.

Season 1, Episode 34

Aired: December 24, 1989 A Trip to the Rain Forest

The Smoggies cut down trees to make matchsticks, and inadvertently cause a forest fire.

Season 1, Episode 35

Aired: December 30, 1989 Cool It

The Smoggies dig up Star Sparkles, but in doing so also destroy the Cuddleups' home. They bribe Cool not to tell anyone by giving him a Star Sparkle.

Season 1, Episode 36

Aired: December 31, 1989 A Feather in Her Cap

Emma captures the plume birds to use their tail feathers for making hats.

Season 1, Episode 37

Aired: January 6, 1990 Black Day in Suntot Town

Clarence creates acid rain so he can sell umbrellas to the Suntots.

Season 1, Episode 38

Aired: January 7, 1990 Seaweed Frenzy

The Smoggies create belts out of the scales from radiant rainbow fish, and sell them to the Suntots. But without the fish to eat it, the seaweed starts growing out of control.

Season 1, Episode 39

Aired: January 13, 1990 Anniversary Schmaltz

Clarence harvests pearl oysters to make a necklace for Emma's anniversary.

Season 1, Episode 40

Aired: January 14, 1990 Mushroom Menace

The Smoggies accidentally release a cloud of fungal spores from an iceberg, causing an infestation of mushrooms on Coral Island.

Season 1, Episode 41

Aired: January 20, 1990 Heat Wave

Smoggies trick the Suntots into running on a treadmill to power an ice-making machine. Meanwhile, Emma hypnotizes Speed to try to get the Magic Coral.

Season 1, Episode 42

Aired: January 21, 1990 Air Scare

Smoggies try to create fuel oil from the rocks on Coral Island, but in doing so pollute the air. Anything exposed to the pollution becomes aggressive.

Season 1, Episode 43

Aired: January 27, 1990 Dirty Soap

The Smoggies fill the sea with soap causing the water to fog up and the underwater plants to overgrow so they can get the treasure Suntots were hunting. Meanwhile, Cookie tries to give Hobo a bath.

Season 1, Episode 44

Aired: January 28, 1990 Polluto's Nightmare

Speed and Leela sneak on board the Stinky Poo but are captured by Polluto. That evening, Polluto has nightmares about his past misdeeds...

Season 1, Episode 45

Aired: February 3, 1990 Buried But Not Gone

Polluto buries the waste fuel from Clarence's new machine on Coral Island. But the fuel emits rays that cause reversal sickness.

Season 1, Episode 46

Aired: February 4, 1990 Target Practice

Polluto discovers some old waste chemicals turn things to stone. He shoots animals with a water pistol to turn them into statues.

Season 1, Episode 47

Aired: February 10, 1990 Cycles

The Smoggies plant an orchard of cocoa trees using a super fertiliser. But the fertiliser causes the algae in the water to grow out of control.

Season 1, Episode 48

Aired: February 11, 1990 Bouncy Briny

Another of Clarence's failed youth potions causes the sea to turn to rubber. Suntots must save the stranded animals before they dry out.

Season 1, Episode 49

Aired: February 17, 1990 Wave Goodbye

The Smoggies' blasting for gold triggers a tidal wave that threatens to destroy Suntot Town.

Season 1, Episode 50

Aired: February 18, 1990 Timber

The Smoggies cut down an entire forest of trees to build Emma a house. But without the trees, rain washes mud into the water causing a flood.

Season 1, Episode 51

Aired: February 24, 1990 Oil or Nothing

Smoggies drill for oil on Coral Island, causing a huge oil slick and putting nature out of balance.

Season 1, Episode 52

Aired: February 25, 1990 Deep Sleep

The fumes from Clarence's new vehicle put Suntots and animals to sleep.

== DVD release ==
On 26 September 2006, a DVD entitled Stop The Smoggies - Anti-Pollution Revolution DVD was released in Region 1. It contains the first four episodes of the series.

== Opening credits ==
The main title theme in the English version was written by Joe Raposo, who also wrote themes for Sesame Street, Shining Time Station, Three's Company, and The Electric Company. This song was also composed by Judy Henderson, who also wrote themes for Arthur, Mona the Vampire, and Sagwa, the Chinese Siamese Cat.
