= Belle and Sebastian (2017 TV series) =

Animated children's television series

- English title screen
- Genre: Historical; Adventure; Comedy drama
- Based on: Belle et Sébastien by Cécile Aubry
- Developed by: Jean-Philippe Robin
- Directed by: Lionel François
- Voices of: English: Angela Galuppo; Terrence Scammell; Arthur Holden; Brittany Drisdelle; Sonja Ball; Vlasta Vrána; Jessica Kardos; French: Pascale Montreuil; Tristan Harvey; Kim Jalabert; Ludivine Dubé-Reding; Hugolin Chevrette-Landesque; Benoit Briére
- Theme music composer: Music and lyrics by Béatrice Martin; Direction and arrangement by Renaud Bastien
- Opening theme: "Belle and Sebastian" performed by Cœur de pirate
- Composer: HITnRUN
- Countries of origin: Canada; France
- Original languages: English; French
- No. of seasons: 1
- No. of episodes: 52

Production
- Executive producers: François Trudel; Vincent Leroux; Nicolas Atlan; Sidonie Dumas; Christophe Riandée
- Producers: Marc Dhrami; François Trudel
- Editors: Patrick Phelpin; Anne-Claire de Heredia
- Running time: 11 minutes
- Production companies: Gaumont Animation; Groupe PVP

Original release
- Network: Ici Radio-Canada Télé / Knowledge Network (Canada); M6 / Piwi + (France); KiKA (Germany); Ketnet (Belgium); RTS Un (Switzerland)
- Release: September 9, 2017 – 2018

Belle and Sebastian (Belle et Sébastien) is a Canadian–French animated children's adventure television series based on the story created by Cécile Aubry, which was first adapted as a live-action television series in the 1960s. A co-production of Montreal-based Groupe PVP and France's Gaumont Animation, it consists of 52 episodes of 11 minutes, directed by Lionel François, and is aimed at children aged six to eight. It premiered on Ici Radio-Canada Télé on 9 September 2017 and received two nominations at the 2018 Prix Gémeaux.

== Plot ==
When Sebastian, a young orphan living in the Alps, meets Belle, a huge white Great Pyrenees, they set off together on a series of fantastic adventures around the mountains.

== Characters ==
- Sebastian (voiced by Angela Galuppo) is a young orphan. He is a stubborn but brave part of the Mountaineers.
- Belle is a huge Great Pyreness.
- Cameron (voiced by Jessica Kardos) is Sebastian's frenemy, and Gabriel's friend.
- Gabriel (voiced by Sonja Ball) is Cameron's friend.
- Caspar (voiced by Terrence Scammell) is Angelina and Sebastian's grandfather.
- Anton (voiced by Arthur Holden) is the main antagonist of the series who always tries to capture Belle.
- Angelina (voiced by Brittany Drisdelle) is Sebastian's older sister and mother figure.
- Roberta (voiced by Sonja Ball) is Cameron's mother. Angelina describes her as a tough cookie.
- Mr. Damien is Cameron's father.
- Ivan (voiced by Vlasta Vrána)
- Victor is a student with asthma who often likes to visit Sonny and Adele. He appeared in "The Beauty and the Pug".
- Madeline (voiced by Jessica Kardos)
- Maurice
- Elaina (voiced by Stephanie Buxton) is the mother of Sonny and Adele, and the mayor of the village. She doesn't like Belle.
- Adele (voiced by Angela Galuppo) is the older sister of Sonny. As of "On Cold Terms", she is Sebastian's best human friend.
- Megan is one of the students at the school.
- Yuki is Gabriel's pet dog.
- Professor Turner (voiced by Matthew Gagnon) is a teacher at the school.
- Dr. William (voiced by Mark Camacho)
- Sonny (voiced by Eleanor Noble) is a sometimes clumsy boy who is the younger brother of Adele.
- Lynette (voiced by Holly Gauthier-Frankel) is a student at the school.
- Pierrette (voiced by Holly Gauthier-Frankel)
- Martin (voiced by Rick Jones)
- Mitch (voiced by Julian Casey) is the fearless, Everest winner of the Silver Ice Axe.
- Franck (voiced by Thor Bishopric) is a mountain climber.

== Production ==
In September 2015, Variety reported that Gaumont Animation was developing an animated series based on Aubry's story. Later that month, Groupe PVP signed a co-production agreement with Gaumont for two animated series including Belle and Sebastian; M6 in France and ICI Radio-Canada had already signed on negotiations with Canal+ and ZDF were under way, and production was expected to begin in early 2016.

In February 2016, Gaumont Television announced a broadcast deal with Germany's ZDF for the series, described as a 2D HD production following earlier sales to M6, Piwi+, Radio-Canada, VRT, RTBF and RTS. ZDF's head of international co-productions, Nicole Keeb said the series fit its portfolio of classic animal and childhood stories such as Lassie, Heidi and Wickie. Lionel François directed the series and sixteen writers are credited including Jean-Philippe Robin.

PVP also produced a companion online and mobile 2D adventure-puzzle game for children aged six to nine in which players join Belle and Sebastian on three expeditions in the Alps.

== Episodes ==
1. The White Dragon
2. The Curious Kid
3. The Wild Mountaineers
4. Race Against the Train
5. Fearless Sonny
6. Mountain School
7. Trapped
8. The Secret Passage
9. The New Cameron
10. The Promise
11. The Fear in Fearless
12. Jealous
13. The Beauty and the Pug
14. Mayhem at the Inn
15. Vote Belle!
16. Picture-Perfect Village
17. The Faded Mount
18. The Pact
19. The Great Bow Shelter
20. Belle, the Sheepdog
21. No Name Peak
22. The Great Nordic Race
23. The Angelina Mission
24. On Cold Terms
25. Sick as a Dog
26. Caspar's Journal
27. Sealed Lips
28. The White Bear
29. The Black Eagle
30. The Mountain Fire
31. Home is Where the Heart Is
32. At the Top
33. Chore Day
34. The Presentation
35. The First Meeting, The Runaway (Part 1)
36. The First Meeting, The Hunt (Part 2)
37. Lucky Star
38. Beautiful Memories
39. Werewolf
40. Sebastian's Vertigo
41. The Invisible Threat
42. The Attack
43. The Great Drought
44. Adele's Bracelet
45. The Happy Shelter Needs Work
46. Oh My Mom
47. The Little Mountain Guide
48. Parasites
49. Angelina's Secret
50. The Desperate Chamois
51. The Saint-Martin Amulet
52. Vitamin

== Broadcast ==
The series first began airing on Ici Radio-Canada Télé on September 9, 2017. It premiered in France on M6 on October 9 the same year. In the United States, the series began airing on TiVi5MONDE on June 13, 2018 and later in Germany, it premiered on KiKa on September 22.

The show had its English language debut on Knowledge Network on October 7, 2017. In Singapore, it began airing on Channel 5's Okto block on June 7, 2019. Belle and Sebastian also aired on Nick Jr in Australia and CITV in United Kingdom.

== Accolades ==
At the 2018 Prix Gémeaux, the series was a finalist for best animated program or series and its companion game was a finalist for best digital component for a youth program or series. At the 2018 Youth Media Alliance Awards of Excellence, it was a finalist for best digital production for children from preschool to age 8 and for the Parents' Award for best interactive content for ages 2–8.
