= Christophe Riandee =

French film producer and entrepreneur (born 1968)

Christophe Riandee (born February 5, 1968) is a French film producer and entrepreneur, best known for the productions of crime drama series Narcos and Hannibal.

Riandee served as the Vice CEO of French film company Gaumont from 2003 to 2024. He lives in Paris and Los Angeles.

== Career ==
Christophe Riandee graduated from the business school ESCP Europe in Paris. His early career steps include service network Ernst & Young, TV production company France Animation, where he was CEO and France Telecom (Orange S.A.) where he developed the Wanadoo theme channels.

In 2003 Riandee joined French film studio Gaumont where he was named Vice CEO in 2004. Under his leadership, Gaumont International Television was created in 2010 to produce mainly US series for international markets. Subsequently the Los Angeles office was launched in 2011. Gaumont successfully entered the US American Market with the "straight-to-series" producing model. In 2016 Riandee received a Golden Globe Award nomination for Narcos as "Best Television Series — Drama".

In 2019, he headed the jury of Series Mania Co-Pro Pitching Sessions.

== Classical music ==
In 2002 Christophe Riandee founded the music school Jeune Choeur de Paris, a singing school for young singers. He is president of the classical music ensemble Ensemble Matheus in Paris.

== Filmography ==
=== Film ===
Year	Title	Credited as	Note(s)
2006	OSS 117: Cairo, Nest of Spies	Executive producer	
2009	Splice	Producer	
2010	Last Night	Executive producer	
2010	Twelve	Executive producer	
2013	Paranoia	Executive producer	
2013	Only God Forgives	Executive producer	
2016	The Neon Demon	Executive producer	
2019	Point Blank	Executive producer	
2021	Lords of Scam	Executive producer	
2026	High in the Clouds	Producer	
TBA	The Last Train to New York	Executive producer	

=== Television ===
Year(s)	Title	Credited as	Note(s)
2013 — 2015	Hemlock Grove	Executive producer	
2013 — 2015	Hannibal	Executive producer	
2013	Love is Dead	Executive producer	Television film
2014	Résistance	Delegate producer	Miniseries
2014 — 2015	Hotel de la Plage	Producer	As Christophe Riandée
2014	La Trouvaille de Juliette	Executive producer	Television film
2015 — 2021	F is for Family	Executive producer	
2015 — 2018	Narcos	Producer	
2016 — 2017	Glacé	Executive producer	Miniseries
2017	Furiki Wheels	Executive producer	
2017	Belle and Sebastian	Executive producer	As Christophe Riandée
2017 — present	Art of Crime	Executive producer	
2018 — 2021	Narcos: Mexico	Executive producer	
2018 — 2020	Noddy, Toyland Detective	Executive producer	Season 2; as Christophe Riandée
2019	Les Ombres de Lisieux	Executive producer	Television film
2020 — present	Barbarians	Executive producer	
2020 — 2023	Stillwater	Executive producer	
2021 — present	Lupin	Producer	
2021	Nona et ses filles	Producer	
2021	Chouette, pas chouette!	Producer	
2021 — 2022	Do, Re & Mi	Executive producer	
2021	Bionic Max	Executive producer	
2022	Off Season	Executive producer	
2022	What Pauline Is Not Telling You	Executive producer	
2022	Samurai Rabbit: The Usagi Chronicles	Executive producer	
2023	Deutsches Haus	Executive producer	
2023	Pamela Rose, la série	Executive producer	
2023	Blood Coast	Executive producer	
2024	In her car	Executive producer	
