= The Legend of White Fang =

- Genre: Adventure
- Based on: White Fang by Jack London
- Developed by: Crayon Animation
- Starring: Rick Jones; Patricia Rodrigues; Michael Rudder; Mark Hellman; Pierre Lenoir; Neil Shee; Terrence Scammell; Thelma Farmer; Anik Matern
- Countries of origin: Canada; France
- No. of seasons: 1
- No. of episodes: 26

Production
- Executive producer: Micheline Charest
- Production companies: CINAR Films; Anabase; CNC; Sofica Coimage 3 Telefilm Canada

Original release
- Network: Family Channel; Global (Canada); TF1 (France); HBO (U.S.)
- Release: 1 January – 25 June 1994

The Legend of White Fang is an animated television series based on the 1906 novel White Fang by Jack London. The show focuses on the main dog protagonist and a young human companion, 12-year-old female Wendy Scott, in the place of the novel's male trail guide, Weedon Scott, spanning 26 episodes for one season.

== Production ==
Quebec-based Cinar (now WildBrain) produced the series and writer/journalist/popular historian, Pierre Berton, was a history consultant for the series.

== Plot ==
12-year-old Wendy, a brave and kind girl, befriends wolf-husky mix White Fang. They share many adventures in Yukon's rugged Klondike territory during the Klondike Gold Rush where they encounter wolf packs, gold thieves, First Nations people, otters, poachers and treacherous avalanches.

== Voice cast ==
- Mark Hellman as White Fang
- Patricia Rodriguez as Wendy
- Terrence Scammell as Weedon/Alex
- Pierre Lenoir as Sgt. Oakes
- Neil Shee as Raven Moon
- Michael Rudder as Beauty Smith
- Rick Jones as Matt
- Thelma Farmer as She Wolf
- Anik Matern as Jeannie/Bella
- Eramelinda Boquer
- Sonja Ball
- A.J. Henderson
- Thor Bishopric
- Michael O'Reilly
- Kathleen Fee
- George Morris
- Susan Glover
- Richard Dumont
- Vlasta Vrána
- Harry Standjofski
- Bronwen Mantel
- Jeannie Walker
- Daniel Brochu
- Greg Morton
- Liz MacRae
- Maria Bircher
- Norman Groulx
- Gary Jewell
- Gordon Masten
- Alan Keiping Legros
- Dean Hagopian
- Pauline Little
- Johni Keyworth
- Arthur Holden
- Teddy Lee Dillon
- Ian Finlay
- Jane Woods
- Carlyle Miller

== Episodes ==
No.	Title	Original release date
1	"The Gold Nugget"	1 January 1994
2	"Banished"	8 January 1994
3	"William"	15 January 1994
4	"Fool's Gold"	22 January 1994
5	"Two Free Beings"	29 January 1994
6	"The River of Life"	5 February 1994
7	"The Ice Bound Boat"	12 February 1994
8	"The Expedition"	19 February 1994
9	"Leap of Danger"	26 February 1994
10	"An Adventure at Every Turn"	5 March 1994
11	"The Golden Touch"	12 March 1994
12	"The Revenge"	19 March 1994
13	"Otter Madness"	26 March 1994
14	"The Fountain of Gold"	2 April 1994
15	"Sharper"	9 April 1994
16	"Wendy Runs Away"	16 April 1994
17	"The Traitor"	23 April 1994
18	"A Charmed Life"	30 April 1994
19	"The Lynx"	7 May 1994
20	"The Thunder Mask"	14 May 1994
21	"The Great Showman"	21 May 1994
22	"Keewan"	28 May 1994
23	"White Fang Goes To Town"	4 June 1994
24	"The Team"	11 June 1994
25	"The Beavers"	18 June 1994
26	"The Trap"	25 June 1994

== Telecast and home media ==
The Legend of White Fang was first aired on the pay-TV network Family Channel in 1994. It also aired on Global Television Network and TF1 in France. HBO later broadcast it in the U.S. In the United Kingdom, it aired on Channel 4.

Two volumes were released on DVD in 2006, each containing four episodes.

On 14 September 2010, Mill Creek Entertainment released the entire series on DVD in Region 1. It includes bonus episodes of Busytown Mysteries, The Busy World of Richard Scarry, Flight Squad, Ripley's Believe It or Not!: The Animated Series and The Country Mouse and the City Mouse Adventures. The first disc was also released as single DVD on the same day called Wild and Free containing the same Busytown Mysteries episode.

As of 2022, full episodes are available on YouTube.
