= Rai Fiction =

Italian production company

- Type: Subsidiary
- Industry: Television
- Founded: 1997
- Products: TV series, movies, animation
- Parent: Radiotelevisione Italiana

Rai Fiction is an Italian production company founded in 1997. Owned and operated by Radiotelevisione Italiana (RAI), the national broadcasting company of Italy, the company produces content for Rai's channels, producing animations, sitcoms, and other programmes. Rai Fiction also works in association with foreign production studios and TV channels as well as other production companies in Italy.

== Productions ==
=== TV series ===
- La piovra (1984)
- Un posto al sole (1996–present)
- Un medico in famiglia (1998–2016)
- Inspector Montalbano (1999–2021)
- Don Matteo (2000-2020)
- Dracula (2002)
- Perlasca, un Eroe Italiano (2002)
- Un caso di coscienza (2003–2013)
- Milo (2003)–with Paz
- Provaci ancora prof (2005-2017)
- L'ispettore Coliandro (2006–2010)
- Capri (2006–2010)
- La buona battaglia – Don Pietro Pappagallo (2006)
- Tutti pazzi per amore (2008–2012)
- Usahana (2008)
- Pinocchio (2009)
- C'era una volta la città dei matti... (2010)
- Che Dio ci aiuti (2011–present)
- Cugino & cugino (2011)`
- Fuoriclasse (2011–2015)
- Caccia al Re – La narcotici (2011)
- Rossella (2011–2013)
- Un passo dal cielo (2011–present)
- The Young Montalbano (2012–2015)
- Una grande famiglia (2012–2015)
- Carlo & Malik (2012)
- Braccialetti rossi (2014–2016)
- È arrivata la felicità (2015–2018)
- Il paradiso delle signore (2015–present)
- La dama velata (2015)
- Thou Shalt Not Kill (2015–2018)
- The Mafia Kills Only in Summer (2016)
- Non dirlo al mio capo (2017)
- Suburra: Blood on Rome (2017–2020)
- La porta rossa (2017–2023)
- Medici (2016–2019)
- My Brilliant Friend (2019–present) - Co-production with HBO and TIMvision (season 1)
- The Name of the Rose (2019) - Co-production with Tele München Gruppe
- Leonardo (2021)
- Bangla - La serie (2022)
- Rocco Schiavone (2016–)
- The Bastards of Pizzofalcone (2017–)

=== TV films ===
- Imperium
  - Imperium: Augustus (2003)
  - Imperium: Nero (2004)
  - Imperium: Saint Peter (2005)
  - Imperium: Pompeii (2007)
  - Augustine: The Decline of the Roman Empire (2010)
- Bartali: The Iron Man (2006)
- Il Pirata: Marco Pantani (2007)
- Barabbas (2012)
- Il bambino cattivo (2013)

=== Animated series ===
Title	Years	Network	Notes
Sandokan	1998–2006	Rai 1	co-production with Mondo TV and SEK Studio
Tommy & Oscar	2000–2002	Rai 1	co-production with Rainbow
Pet Pals	2003	Rai 2	co-production with Gruppo Alcuni
Cosmic Cowboys	2003	Rai Gulp	co-production with Gaumont Animation, Tooncan Productions VI Inc, Europool, Agogo Media, Gruppo Alcuni, LuxAnimations and Sofica France Télévision Images 2
The Spaghetti Family	2003–2004	Rai 3	co-production with The Animation Band and Mondo TV
Winx Club	2004–2015	Rai 2/Rai Gulp; Nickelodeon/Nick Jr. (international, S5-7)	co-production with Rainbow and Nickelodeon Animation Studio (S5-7); Moved to Rai Ragazzi for season 8
Potlach	2006	Rai 3 France 3 (France)	co-production with Ellipsanime
Monster Allergy	2006–2009	Rai 2 Kika (Germany); M6 (France)	co-production with Rainbow S.p.A, Futurikon and ZDF
Bird Squad	2008–2009	Rai 2	co-production with Ellipsanime, Toposodo, Araneo and Breakthrough Entertainment
Rahan: Son of the Dark Age	2008–2009	Rai Gulp; Canal+ Family & France 3 (France); Kika (Germany)	co-production with Xilam Animation, Castelrosso Films and ZDF Enterprises
Huntik: Secrets & Seekers	2009–2011	Rai 2	co-production with Rainbow
Geronimo Stilton	2009–2017	Rai 2 & Rai Gulp; M6/France 5 (France)	co-production with Atlantyca Entertainment, MoonScoop (seasons 1–2) and Superprod Animation (season 3)
PopPixie	2010–2011	Rai 2	co-production with Rainbow
The Little Prince	2010–2015	Rai 2/Rai Yoyo; France 3 WDR (Germany)	co-production with Method Animation, LPPTV, LP Animation, DQ Entertainment, Fabrique D'Images, Sony Pictures Home Entertainment (seasons 1–2), AB Productions (season 3) and ARD
FloopaLoo, Where Are You?	2011–2015/2016; 2016/2017	Rai 2/Frisbee; Canal+ Family/Teletoon+ & France 5 (France)	season 1 only co-production with Xilam Animation and Castelrosso Films (season 1)
Calimero	2013–2016	Rai 2 TF1 (France); TV Tokyo (Japan)	co-production with Gaumont Animation, Gaumont Television, Studio Campedelli, Kodansha, Telepool and Global Digital Creations Holdings Ltd.
Linkers: Secret Codes	2014–2015	Rai Gulp; Canal J & Gulli (France)	Originally titled Cross Worlds; co-production with Ellipsanime Productions, Les Cartooneurs Associés, Enanimation and World Dong Man Company
Tip the Mouse	2014–2020	Rai YoYo; Super RTL (Germany)	co-production with Made 4 Entertainment, Studio Campedelli, Studio Bozzetto & Co and Giunti Editore

- Lupo Alberto (1997-2002)
- Giak & Zak (1997-2006)
- Princess Sissi (1997)
- Tommy and Oscar (1999)
- Geronimo Stilton (1999-2005)
- Cocco Bill (2001-2004)
- Gino the Chicken (2002)
- Pet Pals (2003)
- The Adventures of Marco & Gina (2003)
- Martin Mystery (2003–2006)
- Milo (2003)
- Clic & Kat (2004) – a short animated television series. It was co–produced by MatitAnimatA, Cineteam and Rai Fiction in 2004. The series is broadcast on Rai 2, ZDF, and from March 4, 2014, the Italian channel Planet Kids.
- Wheel Squad (2000-2002)
- Team Galaxy (2006–2007)
- School for Vampires (2006-2010)
- Ripples (2007–2009)
- Water & Bubbles (2007-2010)
- Arturo & Kiwi (2007-2010)
- Il mondo di Stefi (2008)
- Matt's Monsters (2008–2009)
- Gawayn (2008–2012)
- Stellina (2008–2009)
- Uffa! Che pazienza (2008–2010)
- PsicoVip (2009)
- Rahan (2009–2010)
- (2009–2012)
- Spike Team (2010–present)
- Henry the Cat (2010–2013)
- Teen Days (2010)
- The Invisible Man (2011)
- Lucky Fred (2011)
- The DaVincibles (2011)
- FloopaLoo, Where Are You? (2011/12-2016; 2016/2017)
- Mofy (2013)
- Regal Academy (2016–2018)
- Pat the Dog (2017–present)
- Trulli Tales (2017–present)
- Leonardo (2018–present)

=== Animated movies ===
- Monster Mash (2000, co-production with DIC Entertainment)

== Partnerships ==
- Paramount Global (Nickelodeon)
- Bertelsmann (Fremantle)
- ZDF
- Futurikon
- Animabit
- Disney Télévision France
- MoonScoop Group
- Rainbow S.p.A.
- SMEC
- Screen 21
- M6
- Eurocartoons
- Warner Bros. International Television
- Home Box Office, Inc.

and many more.

== History logo ==
23 October 2000 - 17 May 2010

18 May 2010 - 9 April 2017

10 April 2017 - present
