= Rick Jones (voice actor) =

Canadian voice actor (born c. 1957)

- Born: Richard Jones c. 1957 (age 68–69); Ottawa, Ontario, Canada
- Occupations: Voice actor; voice director; writer; content developer
- Years active: 1982–present

Richard Jones (born c. 1957) is a Canadian voice actor, voice director, writer and content developer. Since 1982, he has worked with Alphanim, Cinar and Nelvana. Jones has been nominated for a Gemini Award twice in 1988 and 2003.

== Biography ==
During his early years, Jones obtained an undergraduate degree in biology. Whilst he was working on a geology thesis, a friend from Carleton University working at the school radio station asked him to do a voice for an ad, which helped start Jones' career. His first work was in the special The Care Bears in the Land Without Feelings.

== Filmography ==
=== Voice work – series and games ===
- The Care Bears in the Land Without Feelings (1983) – Tender Heart Bear, Good Luck Bear, Birthday Bear
- The Care Bears Battle the Freeze Machine (1984) – Tender Heart Bear, Good Luck Bear, Birthday Bear
- The Velveteen Rabbit (1985) – Rabbit 1, Rabbit 2
- The Raccoons (1985–1991) – Sidekick, Delivery Ape, Master of Ceremonies, Mr. Mammoth's Assistant
- The Tin Soldier (1986) – Lefty, Rat 1, Rat 3
- Babar and Father Christmas (1986) – Zephir, Lazzaro, Podular, Mice
- Dennis the Menace (1986–1988) – Additional Voices (Season 2)
- The Adventures of Teddy Ruxpin (1986–1987) – Additional Voices
- Diplodos (1988) – Puncher
- The Railway Dragon (1988) – French Chef, Hunter's Son
- Bluetoes the Christmas Elf (1988) – Lonesome, Whitey
- The Smoggies (1988–1991) – Uncle Boom, Sailor, Choo-Choo
- The Admiral and the Princess (1989) – Baggot
- Bobobobs (1989) – Cornelius, Blip
- Happy Castle (1989)
- Nutsberry Town (1989–1990) – Mr. Lettuce, Mr. Pumpkin
- Bumpety Boo (1989) – Additional Voices
- The Littl' Bits (1990–1992) – Elderbit
- The Little Flying Bears (1990) – Ozzy, Slink
- The Jungle Book (1990) – Anwar, Dusty, Sargah
- Sharky & George (1990–1991) – Additional Voices
- Saban's Adventures of Pinocchio (1990–1991) – The Cricket
- Saban's Adventures of Peter Pan (1990–1991) – Additional Voices
- Maya the Honey Bee (1990–1992) – Orvill, Alexander, Flap
- Rupert (1991–1997) – Yum
- Saban's Adventures of the Little Mermaid (1991) – Additional Voices
- C.L.Y.D.E. (1991) – C.L.Y.D.E.
- Bob in a Bottle (1991) – Additional Voices
- Jungle Tales (1991) – Pete Penguin, Scooter Squirrel
- Young Robin Hood (1991–1992)
- Tooth Fairy, Where Are You? (1991) – Judge, Father
- Samurai Pizza Cats (1992–1993) – Speedy Cerviche, Mojo Rojo
- The Legend of the North Wind (1992) – Barnaby
- The Legend of White Fang (1992–1994) – Matt
- Saban's Gulliver's Travels (1992–1993) – Additional Voices
- Christopher Columbus (1992–1993) – Bartolomeo Columbus
- Around the World in Eighty Dreams (1992–1994) – Oscar, Grandpa Tadpole
- Spirou (1992–1993) – Kanvalo-Bobo
- Sandokan (1992–1994)
- Bunch of Munsch (1992)
- Favorite Songs (1992)
- The Real Story of Twinkle Twinkle Little Star (1992) – Paddy, Guard
- The Real Story of Au Clair de La Lune (1992) – Sandman
- The Adventures of Grady Greenspace (1992–1995) – Scuzzy
- Kitty Cats (1992–1997) – Flap
- David Copperfield (1993) – Additional Voices
- The Busy World of Richard Scarry (1993–1997) – Additional Voices
- The Adventures of Huckleberry Finn (1993–1994) – Additional Voices
- Go Hugo Go (1993) – Zag
- Zoe and Charlie (1993–1994)
- Papa Beaver's Storytime (1993–1994) – Additional Voices
- For Better or For Worse (TV Specials) (1993, 1995) – Car Dealer, Pizza Man, Police Officer
- Anna Banana (1994–1997) – Mr Bliffle
- Cat Tales (1994–1995) – The Duck
- Jagged Alliance (1994)
- Taa Tam (1995)
- The Little Lulu Show (1995–1999)
- Little Bear (1995–2000) – No Feet
- The Babaloos (1995–1998) – Teaspoon
- Robinson Sucroe (1995–1996)
- Wimzie's House (1995–1996) – Narrator (Audiobooks)
- The Big Garage (1995–1996) – Yorky, Rusty, Tooly
- Ace Ventura: Pet Detective (1996–1999)
- Sea Dogs (1996–1997)
- The Magical Adventures of Quasimodo (1996–1997)
- Jagged Alliance: Deadly Games (1996)
- Tracer (1996)
- Dracula's Secret (1996)
- Legends of the Land (1996)
- Stickin' Around (1996–1998) – Additional Voices
- Blazing Dragons (1996–1998) – Evil Knight 1 (Season 2)
- Hugo the Movie Star (1996) – Zag
- Happy Birthday Bunnykins (1996) – Additional Voices
- Arthur (1996–2011) – Pepe, Jacob Katzenellenbogan
- Jungle Show (1997) – Tess the Turtle, Bumba the Gorilla and Olive the Monkey
- Donkey Kong Country (1997–2000) - Polly Roger
- Pippi Longstocking (1997–1998) – Kling
- Ned's Newt (1997–1999) – Additional Voices
- The Adventures of Sam & Max: Freelance Police (1997–1998) – Hippie
- Animal Crackers (1997–1999) – Baby Bird, Boa, Additional Voices
- Patrol 03 (1997–1998) – Wilfred
- The Triplets (1997–1999)
- Freaky Stories (1997–2000)
- Ivanhoe (1997–1998)
- The Wombles (1997–1998) – Orinoco
- The Country Mouse and the City Mouse Adventures (1997–1999) – No Tail No Good Nick
- Princess Sissi (1997) – Zottornick
- Birdz (1998–2000) – Gregory Woodpecker
- Anatole (1998–1999)
- Mythic Warriors: Guardians of the Legend (1998–2000)
- The Force of Water (1998)
- Flight Squad (1998–1999)
- Bad Dog (1998–1999) – Dad
- Dog's World (1998–1999)
- Team S.O.S. (1998–2000)
- Kit and Kaboodle (1998–1999)
- Ripley's Believe It or Not!: The Animated Series (1998) – Cyril Barker
- Jim Button (1998–2000) – King
- The Wind (1998) – Narration
- Wheel Meets Friction (1998) – Narration
- The Animal Train (1999) – Jim Jam
- Billy and Buddy (1999)
- X-Chromosome (1999)
- Tommy and Oscar (1999–2000) – Oscar
- The Kids from Room 402 (1999–2001) – Mr Karl
- Mona the Vampire (1999–2006)
- Rotten Ralph (1999–2001) – Ralph
- Mega Babies (1999–2000) – Additional Voices
- Hoze Houndz (1999–2006) – Hozer, Squirt, Additional Voices
- Toad Patrol (1999–2001) – Erebus, Puff Ball, Digger
- Kevin Spencer (1999–2005)
- Jagged Alliance 2 (1999)
- Charley and Mimmo (1999–2002) – Ted
- Jagged Alliance 2: Unfinished Business (2000)
- The Toy Castle (2000–2003) – Narrator
- Lion of Oz (2000)
- Sinbad (2000)
- Pirate Family (2000–2001)
- The Twins (2000–2002)
- Wunschpunsch (2000) – Mauricio di Mauro, Bubonic Preposteror
- Marsupilami (2000–2003)
- For Better or For Worse (2000–2002) (TV series) – Additional Voices
- Inuk (2001) – Tik
- Snailympics (2001–2002)
- Wombat City (2001–2005) – Additional Voices
- Belphegor (2001–2004) – Additional Voices
- X-DuckX (2001–2002) – Slax
- Iron Nose (2001–2003)
- Spaced Out (2002–2003) – Fax, Goodgrief, Guy
- The New Adventures of Lucky Luke (2001–2003) – Jack Dalton
- The Bellflower Bunnies (2001–2005)
- Explosives (2001)
- Edward (2001–2003)
- Fridge Magnets (2001) – Max
- Momo (2001) – Hahn, Bruno
- Wizardry 8 (2001)
- Simon in the Land of Chalk Drawings (2001–2002) – Henry
- Sagwa, the Chinese Siamese Cat (2001–2003) – Fu-Fu
- Shaolin Kids (2001–2003)
- Fred the Caveman (2002) – Fred
- Evolution Worlds (2002) – Pedro
- Pet Pals (2002–2003) – Mouse, Duck, Mole
- Malo Korrigan (2002–2005) – Jonas
- Kaput & Zösky (2002–2003) – Kaput
- Splinter Cell (2002)
- Daft Planet (2002)
- Pig City (2002–2004) – Additional Voices
- Pecola (2002)
- Kid Paddle (2003–2006)
- Martin Morning (2003–2004)
- Creepschool (2003–2004)
- Jacob Two-Two (2003–2007)
- King (2003–2005) – Additional Voices
- Ratz (2003–2004) – Razmo
- Flat! (2003)
- Noël-Noël (2003)
- Mica (2003)
- Kitou (2003–2004) – Grandpa
- Cosmic Cowboys (2003) – Curtis, Cereal Bob
- Silent Storm (2003)
- The Secret World of Benjamin Bear (2003–2006) – Raymond, Howie
- What's with Andy? (2003–2007) – Mayor Henry K. Roth
- Ocean Tales (2003–2006) – Commandant Costeau
- Martin Mystery (2003–2006)
- The Three Pigs (2003–2004) – Pig 1
- Woofy (2003–2004) – Remi
- Prudence Gumshoe (2004)
- The Boy (2004–2005) – Various Villains
- This Just In! (2004) – Guard 1
- Gino the Chicken (2004–2006) – Ray Mundo
- Lili's Island (2004–2007)
- Atomic Betty (2004–2006)
- 3 Gold Coins (2004–2005)
- The Adventures of Princess Sydney (2004)
- Tradition of the Christmas Log (2004) – Mr. Bakewell
- Dragon Hunters (2004) – Gwizdo, Hector
- The Eggs (2004–2005) – Eggor
- Tripping the Rift (2004–2007) – Whip
- Tupu (2005) – Norton
- Faireez (2005) – Jumphrey, Ogle
- Splinter Cell: Chaos Theory (2005)
- Funpak (2005)
- Monster Allergy (2005) – Bombo, Bram-Bombak
- Yakari (2005) – Slow Caribou
- Wayside (2005–2008)
- My Goldfish Is Evil! (2006–2007) – Scoop
- Arthur and the Invisibles (2006) – Additional Voices
- Zoé Kezako (2006) – Additional Voices
- Bronco Teddy (2007)
- Sleeping Betty (2007)
- Moot Moot (2007)
- Naruto: Rise of a Ninja (2007) – Additional voices
- The Future is Wild (2007–2008) – Nixes Friends, Additional Voices
- Gofrette (2007–2008) – Wendell
- Leon in Wintertime (2007) – The King
- Fred's Head (2007–2008) – Gregory Gilbert Pyrowski, Mr. Pyrowski
- Manon (2008)
- In Laws (2008)
- Punch! (2008)
- Monster Buster Club (2008–2009) – Hugo Smith
- Oscar and Spike (2008–present)
- Huntik: Secrets & Seekers (2009–2011) – Klaus, LeBlanche
- Pipi, Pupu and Rosemary (2009)
- Fishtronaut (2009)
- Eo (2009)
- Jimmy Two-Shoes (2009–2011)
- Puss 'n Boots (2009) – The Jester
- Walter and Tandoori (2009–2010) – Walter
- The Mysteries of Alfred Hedgehog (2009)
- My Life Me (2010–2011)
- PopPixie (2010)
- Spliced (2009–2010)
- Life on the Block (2010)
- Tempo Express (2010)
- Sidekick (2010–2013) – Various
- Assassin's Creed III: The Tyranny of King Washington (2013) – Blue Coats
- The Day My Butt Went Psycho! (2013–2015) – Additional Voices
- Grojband (2013–2015) – Additional voices
- George of the Jungle (2015) – Additional Voices
- Looped (2016) – Additional voices

=== Voice work – animated features ===
- The Treasure of Swamp Castle (1988) – General Tubthumper
- Train Mice (1989)
- Dragon and Slippers (1991)
- Charlie Strapp and Froggy Ball Flying High (1991)
- Charles Dickens' David Copperfield (1993)
- Go Hugo Go (1993) – Zag
- How the Toys Saved Christmas (1996) – Duck, General Lajoie, Yellow Crayon, Uncle Hank
- Pippi Longstocking (1997) – Constable Kling
- Anastasia (1997) – Nicholas II, additional voices
- Little Witch (1999) – Parrot, Harry
- Heavy Metal 2000 (2000) – Zeek
- Spookley the Square Pumpkin (2004) – Edgar, Little Tom
- Stardust (2007) – Kobold
- Gene Fusion (2007) – Flozell, Hondo
- Go West! A Lucky Luke Adventure (2007)
- Tripping the Rift: The Movie (2008) – Whip
- Walter's Christmas (2009) – Walter
- Pinocchio (2010) – Various voices
- Gummibär: The Yummy Gummy Search For Santa (2012) – Vampiro
- Troll: The Tale of a Tail (2018) – Halfstone, Jin, Mort

=== Acting work – live-action movies ===
- Murder C.O.D. (1990) – Sgt. Decker
- Kindergarten Cop (1990) – Keisha's Father
- The Marla Hanson Story (1991) – Cop #1
- Deadly Game (1991) – Hacker
- Body Language (1992) – Security Guard
- Hear No Evil (1993) – FBI Agent #2
- On Deadly Ground (1994) – Villager
- Foxfire (1996) – Security Guard

=== Writer ===
- You Can't Do That on Television (1982–1984)
- The Raccoons (1985–1987)
- The Adventures of Teddy Ruxpin (1986–1987)
- Bluetoes the Christmas Elf (1988)
- Happy Castle (1988–1989)
- The Smoggies (1988–1991)
- The Little Engine That Could (1991)
- The Legend of White Fang (1992–1994)
- The Busy World of Richard Scarry (1993–1997)
- Albert the Fifth Musketeer (1993–1994)
- The Little Lulu Show (1995–1999)
- The Babaloos (1995–1999)
- Robinson Sucroe (1995–1996)
- Dog Tracer (1996)
- Anatole (1998–1999)
- Franklin (1997–1999)
- Kit and Kaboodle (1998)
- Animal Crackers (1997–1999)
- The Adventures of Paddington Bear (1997–2001)
- The Country Mouse and City Mouse Adventures (1998–1999)
- Toad Patrol (1999–2001)
- For Better or For Worse (2000–2002)
- The Toy Castle (2000–2003)

=== Voice director ===
- Happy Birthday Bunnykins (1996)
- Bad Dog 2 (1999)
- Toad Patrol (1999–2001)
- For Better or For Worse (2000–2002)
- Wombat City (2005)
- The Eggs (2004–2005)
- What's with Andy? (2001–2007)
- Prudence Gumshoe (2004)
- Spookley the Square Pumpkin (2004)
- Dragon Hunters (2004)
- Faireez (2005)
- Gofrette (2007–2008)
- Go West! A Lucky Luke Adventure (2007)
- Okura (2008)
- Fishtronaut (2008)
- Fred's Head (2008)
- My Life Me (2010–2011)
- Mati and Dada (2009)
- Walter and Tandoori (2009–2010)
- Life on the Block (2010)
- Tempo Express (2010)
- Gummibär: The Yummy Gummy Search For Santa (2012)
