= Pok & Mok =

- French: Pok et Mok
- Genre: Comedy
- Created by: Isabelle Lenoble; Érik Zilliox
- Directed by: Isabelle Lenoble
- Composer: Alexis Pecharman
- Country of origin: France
- Original language: French
- No. of episodes: 78

Production
- Executive producers: Jean-Pierre Quenet; Mathieu Courtois
- Producer: Heath Kenny
- Running time: 7 minutes
- Production companies: Alphanim; Vivement Lundi! Europool; A Plus Image 2 Feitong Animation

Original release
- Network: Canal+
- Release: January 7 – December 16, 2011

Pok & Mok is a French animated series directed by Isabelle Lenoble and produced by Alphanim and Vivement Lundi! for Canal+.

== Characters ==
- Pok – One of Mok's best friends, is an eight-year-old, short-haired gibbon.
- Mok – A regular eight-year-old kid, one of Pok's best friends. He aspires to become the President of the World, Fireman Gangster and "The Most Famous Toilet Trout Fisherman in the House".
- Camila – A nine-year-old girl and friend to both Mok and Pok. Camila has orange hair. In one episode she tries to kiss Mok.
- Piggles – a talking, green-cheek conure.
- Penelope – Mok's mother, a carefree, optimistic daydreamer.
- Ernest – Mok's father, civil servant of the Ministry of Paperwork. Relaxed on the surface, he is secretly ridden with anxiety. He is an extremely organized and clean person.
- Grandfather − Mok's grandfather is 60 years old and still working on his farm with his wife. He breeds animals and grows fruits and vegetables with much pesticide. He loves his work and practices intensive farming. He complains and rebels against everything. He has little appreciation for his son-in-law, who is also a farmer and offers occasionally rude commentary. He called Ernesto a "city boy".
- Grandmother − Mok's grandmother is also 60 years old. She is happy to have everyone in the house, especially her daughter and her family. Although she has animals on the farm, none of them are real pets, so she is very happy to be home. She considers them to be her own "kitten". She is very dedicated and friendly. She speaks her mind without thinking about the consequences.

== Episodes ==
=== Series overview ===
Season	Episodes	Season premiere	Season finale
Pilot		2009	
1	6	January 7, 2011	February 18, 2011
2	18	February 18, 2011	December 16, 2011

=== Pilot (2009) ===
A pilot episode was released in 2009.

=== Season 1 (2011) ===
No. overall	No. in season	Title	Original release date	Prod. code
1	1	"Lights Out"	January 7, 2011	TBA
Pok and Mok are playing to the island of lights when her parents forbid electricity consumption
2	2	"Paper Present"	January 14, 2011	TBA
Pok and Mok are painting for Penelope's birthday when they learn that wasted too much paper
3	3	"Plastic on the Beach"	January 21, 2011	TBA
Pok and Mok go on vacation to a beach when they learn that this very contaminated, remove plastic bags.
4	4	TBA	TBA	TBA
Mok will Pok and his grandparents, when they find a very dirty Mok.
5	5	"Fresh Fish"	May 13, 2011	TBA
Mok back to school a fish deve care that risk with clogged pipes
6	6	"Ecologic Birthday"	February 18, 2011	TBA
Mok on their birthday begins to discover that the plastic is wasted.

=== Season 2 (2011) ===
No. overall	No. in season	Title	Original release date	Prod. code
7	1	"The Vampire"	April 7, 2011	TBA
After reading a comic, and Mok Pok begins to suspect that his father is a vampire
8	2	"Light Invasion"	March 10, 2011	TBA
Pok Mok and want to observe Mars, when they learn that there is too much light pollution.
9	3	"Compound vs. Manure"	February 18, 2011	TBA
Ernesto and grandfather fought for knowing that fertilizer is better
10	4	TBA	TBA	TBA
Pok and Mok are subjected to paint your room
11	5	TBA	TBA	TBA
Mok refuses to recycle your baby clothes
12	6	TBA	TBA	TBA
Mok and Pok can not eat cookies for having a harmful substance
13	7	TBA	TBA	TBA
Mok wants to change an old CD-ROM by another
14	8	TBA	TBA	TBA
Grandpa turned off all the lights in the house for the henhouse
15	9	TBA	TBA	TBA
The grandfather is putting a solar panel when Pok and Mok believe a dinosaur lizard becomes
16	10	TBA	TBA	TBA
Ernesto drinking by buying a new car
17	11	"The Ecologic Camp of Terror"	October 2, 2011	TBA
Mok filming a movie called "The camp of terror" during the holiday week
18	12	TBA	September 11, 2011	TBA
Mok believes the street is a witch fishwife
19	13	TBA	TBA	TBA
Mok and Pok discarded the tree felled by real one
20	14	TBA	TBA	TBA
21	15	TBA	TBA	TBA
Mok and Pok learn about eat
22	16	TBA	TBA	TBA
23	17	TBA	TBA	TBA
24	18	"Ecologic Machine"	December 16, 2011	TBA

== Broadcast ==
The series aired in Canada on UnisTV.
