= Bionic Max =

French animated series

- Genre: Comedy
- Created by: Thomas Digard; Emmanuel Klotz
- Directed by: Thomas Digard
- Voices of: Jeanne Chartier; Antoine Schoumsky; Bruno Magne; Kaycie Chase; Magali Rosenzweig
- Theme music composer: Arnaud de Bosredon; Charles Delaporte
- Composers: Arnaud de Bosredon; Charles Delaporte; Maxime Singer; Anthony Burlot
- Country of origin: France
- Original language: French
- No. of seasons: 1
- No. of episodes: 52

Production
- Executive producers: Sidonie Dumas; Christophe Riandee; Nicolas Atlan; Cyril Le Pesant
- Running time: 11 minutes
- Production company: Gaumont Animation

Original release
- Network: Gulli; Canal J
- Release: October 22, 2021

Bionic Max is a French animated comedy television series created by Thomas Digard and Emmanuel Klotz. Produced by Gaumont Animation for Gulli and Canal J, the series premiered on October 22, 2021.

== Synopsis ==
The series follows Max, the world's first bionic guinea pig, and his best friend Jean-Claude (often called JC), a goldfish, after they escaped the laboratory they're held in and make their way to Woodchuck Woods and how they try to fit in with local wildlife.

== Episodes ==
1. The Great Escape
2. Max's Muffins
3. Bionic Fax
4. Biono Kicks
5. Molehill Mountain
6. Ouest Pie Story
7. It Takes Two Thieves
8. Woodchuck Chipper
9. Bringing Down The House
10. Get Smurt
11. Fishy Gift
12. Creature From the Max
13. Bring Back Our Bionics
14. Where Is Pesto?
15. Reboot
16. Utopian Wasteland
17. Undercover
18. Mama Chanterelle
19. Battle of the Sands
20. Handy Max
21. Trapped in the Mall
22. Be Happy
23. Super Zero
24. Bionic Flip
25. Hiccup and Down
26. Cleaning Max
27. Mona's Party
28. Last Resort
29. No Time For Losers
30. Lucky Day
31. Kings of the Fair
32. Spooky House
33. Lettuce Go Camping
34. Smells Like Feat
35. Pet Rock
36. Inflatable Max
37. Clueless
38. Surprise
39. Treasure Hunt
40. King Max
41. Outlaws
42. Don't Touch That Dial
43. Identity Crisis
44. Is There a Doctor in the House?
45. Starstruck
46. Worst Responders
47. Follow The Guide
48. Model Citizens
49. Winners and Cruisers
50. Panic Hotel
51. Memory of a Goldfish
52. Looking Out for No. 1 (and No. 6)

== Production ==
The series was greenlit for production by Gaumont Animation on September 27, 2018. Production on the show started between late 2018 and early 2019.

== Broadcast ==
The series premiered in France on Gulli & Canal J in mid-November. The show debuted in Africa on Cartoon Network Africa on 20 December 2021. As of March 2022, it can be seen on Pluto TV.
