= The Small Giant =

Television series

- French: La Petite Géante
- Genre: Shojo
- Created by: Jan Van Rijsselberge
- Directed by: Oliver Raynal
- Opening theme: "The Small Giant Theme"
- Ending theme: "The Small Giant Theme" (instrumental)
- Composer: David Gana
- Countries of origin: France; China
- Original languages: French; Mandarin
- No. of episodes: 52

Production
- Executive producer: Jean-Pierre Quenet
- Producer: Jean-Philippe Robin
- Running time: 13 minutes
- Production companies: Gaumont Alphanim; Jiang Toon Animation; Village Productions; Europool; Cofinova 5

Original release
- Network: Gulli; CCTV-1
- Release: August 28 – November 7, 2010

The Small Giant (French: La Petite Géante) is an animated television series that began in 2010. It was co-produced by Gaumont Alphanim and Jiang Toon Animation in association with Village Productions, Europool and Cofinova 5. Each of the 52 episodes is around 13 minutes long and the first season was translated into English for American distribution.

== Characters ==
- Emily: Emily is a 10-year-old girl who becomes 3 meters tall after moving into an enchanted land.
- Elmer Baokan: Elmer is an 11-year-old boy whose family hosts Emily during her stay and she becomes his adopted little sister.
- Fred: Ten-year-old bundle of nerves and daredevil.
- Betty: A village girl who Emily helps rebuild her hut.
- Jonas: A boy that Emily likes.
- Kinoobi: Kinoobi is Emily's panda backpack that comes to life.
- Callas Kardamohn: 11-year-old girl who's jealous of Emily's size and competes with her for Jonas' attentions.
- Georges Pao-Ju: Hangs out with Callas and Fiona.
- Fiona Surayo: Admirer of Callas.

== Episodes ==
- 1. "Le collier d'Amalia"
- 2. "La fugue de Betty"
- 3. "Le Nid d'Aigle" (English: "The Eagle's Nest")
- 4. "Émilie la sorcière"
- 5. "La pêche aux crabes" (English: "Crab Fishing")
- 6. "Le protégé d'Émilie"
- 7. "Kinoubi vide son sac"
- 8. "L'inondation" (English: "The Flood")
- 9. "La fête du renouveau"
- 10. "La mare aux esprits"
- 11. "La chasse aux papillons" (English: "The Butterfly Hunt")
- 12. "La guerre des cabanes"
- 13. "Mauvaises nuits" (English: "Sleepless Nights")
- 14. "La majorette"
- 15. "Le secret d'Émilie" (English: "Emily's Secret")
- 16. "Les trafiquants"
- 17. "Le filet de Mendelssohn"
- 18. "Georges dans les nuages"
- 19. "La grande douche"
- 20. "Toile d'araignée"
- 21. "La nuit des oisiflores"
- 22. "Du gros poisson"
- 23. "La règle du jeu"
- 24. "Kakis en folie"
- 25. "Bain de boue"
- 26. "La relève"
- 27. "Tête de buffle"
- 28. "Une géante dans la nuit"
- 29. "Les gardes du corps"
- 30. "Un nouveau parfum"
- 31. "Le journal d'Émilie"
- 32. "La panne d'eau"
- 33. "Émilie fait son miel"
- 34. "La nuit des étoiles filantes"
- 35. "La fête d'Émilie"
- 36. "Le serpent à trois yeux"
- 37. "La poule perd la boule"
- 38. "Le labyrinthe des kakis"
- 39. "Georges passe à l'Est"
- 40. "Le rapt de Kinoubi"
- 41. "Votez pour moi"
- 42. "Le concours de cerfs-volant"
- 43. "Fred fait scission"
- 44. "Panier de crabes"
- 45. "L'arbre aux enfants"
- 46. "Le secret du Shaman"
- 47. "Mini Kinoubi"
- 48. "La lampe magique"
- 49. "La marchande"
- 50. "Quand les jumelles s'en mêlent"
- 51. "Le kaki de la justice"
- 52. "Callas a disparu"

== Voices ==
=== Japanese ===
- Kaoru Mizuhara – Emily (Japanese: Kanami)
- Akio Suyama – Kimnobi-Kuma
- Koharu Kusumi – Fiona
- Sayaka Harada – Elmer (Japanese: Kaoru)
- Ryō Horikawa – Shaman (Japanese: Hanakoi)
- Tina Tamashiro – Callas

=== French ===
- Frédérique Marlot – Émilie
- Yann Pichon – Kinoubi
- Astrid Le mellot – Fiona
- Marie Diot – Elmer
- Karine Pinoteau – Fred
- Patrick Noérie – Aaron Baokan
- Magali Rosenzweig – Callas
- Patrick Pellegrin – Shaman
- Coco Noël – Georges

=== English ===
- Stephen Bent
- Felicity Duncan
- Candida Gubbins
- Lesley Harcourt
- Stuart Milligan
- Dave Kitchen
- Jo Lee
- Juliet Prague
- John Vernon

== Broadcast ==
The series was broadcast on Gulli beginning September 2010.
