= The Green Squad =

- Promotional poster
- Genre: Adventure
- Based on: Les Sauvenature by: Jean-Marie Defossez; Fabien Mense
- Directed by: Heath Kenny; Christophe Pittet
- Voices of: Nolan Balzer; Dawn-Marie Hildebrand; Jakob Sanderson; Ian Mikita; Caitlyn Cassel
- Opening theme: "The Green Squad Theme"
- Ending theme: "The Green Squad Theme" (instrumental)
- Composers: Marc Tomasi; Mehdi Elmorabit
- Country of origin: France
- Original language: French
- No. of episodes: 52

Production
- Executive producers: Clément Calvet; Christian Davin
- Producers: Clément Calvet; Heath Kenny
- Editor: Damien Dubois
- Running time: 11 minutes
- Production companies: Gaumont Alphanim; Europool; Cofinova 6; Shanghai Supercolor Technology

Original release
- Network: France 5
- Release: September 24, 2011

The Green Squad is a French animated television series produced by Gaumont Alphanim. It is based on the French comic book series Les Sauvenature written by Jean-Marie Defossez, illustrated by Fabien Mense and published by Flammarion. It has been shown on Starz Kids & Family in the United States from March 16, 2013 to June 11, 2016 also known as Savage Family Wild. The English dub was recorded in Canadian studio.

== Synopsis ==
The Green Squad is the name of a network created by three siblings, Claire, Julian and Thomas Savage along with their pet Wifi, whose mission is to protect plant and animal species, their environments and different kinds of discoveries. Thus, they travel around the world as their job is to protect endangered animals and save Earth's landmarks and artifacts. They embark on their extraordinary adventures as they discuss each other through a worldwide blogging network to save the planet's natural sites.

== Characters ==
- Claire Savage She's a natural born leader of the Green Squad. FR : Geneviève Doang / EN : Dawn-Marie Hildebrand
- Julian Savage He's the only entertaining one who takes pictures with animals. FR : Hélène Bizot / EN : Nolan Balzer
- Thomas Savage He designed the Green Squad blog on the computer. FR : Coco Noël - / EN : Jakob Sanderson
- Wifi The pet ferret who accompanies the Green Squad. FR : / EN :
- Mr. and Mrs. Savage The parents of Claire, Julian and Thomas. They accompany them on their adventures. FR : / EN : Caitlyn Cassel, Ian Mikita
- Julia She's a friend of Mr. and Mrs. Savage. She talks to them about lions. FR : / EN :
- Mark He's the uncle of Claire, Julian and Thomas. Who sometimes accompany them on their adventures. FR : Philippe Valmont / EN :
- Jowandi He's the ranger of Koala Reserve.
- Bruce Lecter He's the poacher of koalas whom kidnapped and setting the bush on fire.
- Mike He's the neighbor of Mark as he is the Australian hunter. He cares about the marsupials of the outback.
- Betaring He's a good friend of Mr. and Mrs. Savage who lives in the rainforest in Indonesia. He has some flowers from the forest to help medicine.
- Sampa She is Betaring's wife.
- Max Riley He's the engineer on the construction site of the rainforest in Indonesia. He wants to dig out the rainforest to build a road, but eventually, Betaring saves his son Jess with flowers so that he can divert the road to another direction away from the rainforest.
- Jess Riley He's a son of Max Riley who have asthma attack.
- George He guides The Green Squad of the caribous in Alaska that one of them is covered in oil.
- Raul Betonas He is a ranger from Cuba who wants to build hotels by cutting trees down thus making hummingbirds fly away. Eventually, he was bitten by a dangerous animal.
- Jorge He is the owner of the Hummingbird Hotel who invites The Green Squad to spend a few nights at his hotel.
- Joseffa She is Jorge's daughter of the Hummingbird Hotel.
- Charlie Rainbow He is a guide of the Grand Canyon who takes care of the Condors.
- Professor Ron Phillips He's the professor from Wyoming University who studies and researches ferrets. He gave Wifi to the Green Squad for all times.
- Jimmy Snake He is from the Shoshone tribe who keeps the ferrets under his protection. He works with Professor Philips to watch over ferrets.
- Doug He's guides the Green Squad to make sure the wolves are safe.
- Tony He's the photographer and capture a photo moment of Claire with the White Wolf.
- Janiki He's the caretaker and researcher of crocodiles from India.
- Admiral Lumet He's from the navy base that can guide The Green Squad to find the giant squid on his submarine.
- Steve He's a friend to The Green Squad and sends a waterproof camera to film the giant squid.
- Joao He's loves snorkeling under the sea and discusses with The Green Squad about saving the dolphins.

== International titles ==
- Savage Family Wild (American English title)
- Les Sauvenature (French title)
- Das Green Team (German title)
- Zielony Patrol (Polish title)
- Green Power הכוח הירוק (Hebrew title)

== Episode list ==
< English titles are mostly transliterations of the original French titles >

	French titre	English title	Original airing date
1	En radeau sur les cimes	The Treetop Raft	April, 02 2011
2	Pangolins en contrebande	The Pangolin Smugglers	April, 06 2011
3	Mission en mer Caspienne	Caspian Sea Mission	April, 09 2011
4	Le trésor des Rimbas	The Orang Rimbas' Treasure	April 16, 2011
5	Iguana Parc	Iguana Park	April 23, 2011
6	S.O.S. Bonobos	SOS Bonobos	April 30, 2011
7	Des koalas dans la fournaise	Fire in the Australian Bush	May, 07 2011
8	De l'eau pour tous	Water for Everyone!	May 14, 2011
9	Que vivent les papillons !	Long Live the Butterflies!	May 21, 2011
10	Pandas en danger	Pandas in Danger	May 28, 2011
11	La forêt des Sengis	The Sengi Forest	June 18, 2011
12	Gare aux loups	Beware of Wolves	June 25, 2011
13	Un amour de furet	Ferret Fancy	June 26, 2011
14	Hôtel Colibris	Hummingbird Hotel	July, 02 2011
15	La muraille verte	The Great Green Wall	July, 03 2011
16	Le vol du condor	The Flight of the Condor	July, 09 2011
17	Une Starlette à Phuket	Seahorse Aid	July 10, 2011
18	La revanche des renards volants	Revenge of the Flying Foxes	July 16, 2011
19	Alerte sur le récif	Reef Rash	July 17, 2011
20	Le roi du cirque	King of the Circus	July 23, 2011
21	Escale à Bornéo	Stopover in Borneo	July 24, 2011
22	Le vol du pélican	The Flight of the Pelican	July 30, 2011
23	Razzia sur les caméléons	Chameleon Raid	July 31, 2011
24	Les dernières sirènes	The Last of the Sirens	August, 06 2011
25	Pétrole en Alaska	Oil in Alaska	August, 07 2011
26	L'œuf ou la tortue	The Turtle or the Egg	August 13, 2011
27	Dauphin prisonnier	The Caged Dolphins	August 14, 2011
28	La fiancée du rhinocéros	The Rhinoceros Bride	August 20, 2011
29	Les larmes du gavial	Gharial Tears	August 21, 2011
30	De l'air pour la planète	Wind Power!	August 27, 2011
31	C'est dans la poche	Spring Into Action!	August 28, 2011
32	Incendie à Madagascar	Fire in Madagascar	September, 03 2011
33	Urgence sur la banquise	Polear Bear Emergency	September 10, 2011
34	Le chant des baleines	The Whales' Song	September 17, 2011
35	Le courage des manchots	The Courage of Penguins	September 24, 2011
36	La nuit du chat pêcheur	The Night of the Fishing Cat	October, 01 2011
37	Les têtes d'or	Heads of Gold	October, 08 2011
38	Le monstre des profondeurs	Deep Sea Monster	October 15, 2011
39	Les dauphins pêcheurs	The Fishing Dolphins	October 22, 2011
40	Requins en péril !	Sharks in Danger!	October 29, 2011
41	Menace sur les loutres	A Threat to Otters	November, 05 2011
42	Sauvons les éléphants	Saving the Elephants	November 12, 2011
43	La fureur du tigre	Fury of the Tiger	November 19, 2011
44	Panique en mer d'Aral	Panic on the Aral Sea	November 26, 2011
45	À la poursuite de l'anaconda	Hunt for the Anaconda	June 18, 2012
46	Trafic sur le net	Trafficking on the Net	June 18, 2012
47	Grenouilles dans la brume	Jungle Toads	June 19, 2012
48	La grande tortue d'or	The Great Golden Turtle	June 19, 2012
49	Le héros de l'Altiplano	Hero of the Altiplano	June 20, 2012
50	Alerte aux cachalots !	Sperm Whale Rescue	June 20, 2012
51	Gare aux hélices	Blades of Danger	June 21, 2012
52	Trafic en Asie	Park Poachers	June 21, 2012

== International broadcasts ==
Country	Channel	Year
United States	Starz Kids & Family	2013-2016
France	France 5	2011–Present
Israel	Logi	2012–Present
Belgium	RTBF	2011–Present
Germany	KiKa	2013–Present
Poland	Canal Plus	2011–Present
Canada	TVO	2014
