= Matt's Monsters =

Television series

- French: Matt & les monstres
- Genre: Occult mystery Science fiction comedy Supernatural
- Created by: Jan Van Rijsselberge
- Written by: Thierry Gaudin; Yves Coulon; Jean-Philippe Robin; Carlotta Mastrangelo; Nicolas Verpilleux; Delphine Dubos; Guillaume Mautalent; Valentina Mazzola; Sebastien Oursel; Franck Taillez; Alba-Maria Calicchio; Frédéric Martin; Luca Olivieri; Yasmine Piva
- Directed by: Gregory Panaccione
- Voices of: Céline Melloul; Karine Pinoteau; Emmanuel Gradi; Marie Diot; Cathy Cerda; Patrick Noérie
- Composer: Laurent Aknin
- Countries of origin: Netherlands; France; Italy
- Original languages: Dutch; French; Italian
- No. of seasons: 1
- No. of episodes: 52

Production
- Executive producer: Jean Pierre-Quenet
- Producers: Clément Calvet; Christian Davin; Maria Fares; Annita Romanelli
- Running time: 12 minutes
- Production companies: Gaumont-Alphanim; Rai Fiction; Lanterna Magica; Europool; Jiang Toon Animation; Sonicville; Cofinova 4 SND

Original release
- Network: Rai 2 / Rai Gulp (Italy); M6 (France); Antena 3 / Disney Channel / Clan (Spain); KiKa (Germany)
- Release: May 23, 2008 – January 14, 2009

Matt's Monsters is a French-Dutch-Italian animated television series created by Jan Van Rijsselberge. It was co-produced by Gaumont-Alphanim (its first television series as a subsidiary of Gaumont), Laterna Magica and Rai Fiction. The show has been broadcast on Disney Channel and Disney XD (formerly Jetix). Matt's Monsters debuted on May 23, 2008, in France, and in other countries on June 1, 2009. The series follows a nine-year-old boy named Matt, who is ready for action as he enlists his dad, his neighbor Manson and his pet monster Dink to run a monster agency as they hunt down for monsters of all shapes, sizes and forms and save the city of Joliville.

== Characters ==
- Matt Average: He is a nine-year-old kid who, along with his dad, his pet monster Dink and his neighbor Manson run a monster agency. He is a boy with a large head, a white T-shirt, a red belt and blue pants. Despite his young age, he is pretty smart and resourceful when it comes to monster hunting. Matt also has three tiny monsters he keeps as pets.
- Manson: She is the neighbor of Matt, a stoic girl with a Gothic appearance who loves everything related to monsters. She is mostly seen wearing a dark green, long sleeved shirt, a brown skirt and grey combat boots. She has long black hair that is tied into low pigtails, is quite pale, and has eyes that match the color of her shirt. A running gag in the series is that Matt's father is constantly mistaking her for a boy, despite her appearance not being boyish at all.
- Bruce Average: He is the enthusiast father of Matt and the neighbor of Manson. He is the owner of the Monster Agency.
- Ellen Average: She is the mother of Matt and the neighbor of Manson. It is very rare that she will tag along on mission, but sometimes she has to save the day.
- Dink: Matt's pet and a good monster. He speaks in its own language that only Matt can understand. He can fire electrical discharges from the horns on his head.
- The Mini-Monsters: Are small and good monsters who Matt keeps as pets. One of the Mini-Monsters is a greenish-brown sludge monster with only one eye, called Mika. The second Mini-Monster is a light purple creature with a cat-like head and the lower body of a squid, called Uxi. The third Mini-Monster is a small, golden colored dragon with glasses and small burgundy wings, called Sid.
- The Mayor: The mayor of the city. He is responsible for giving the missions to Matt, Manson, Bruce and Dink.
- Sheriff: One of the most important agents in the city.
- Madame Bovary: A lady with supposed supernatural powers, along with her accomplice Appendix, who also hunts monsters. Her company is known as "the Company Bovary". She is the business rival of Matt and his father. Her name is taken from Madame Bovary, although her character in general is roughly based in Madame Blavatsky.
- Appendix: Madame Bovary's henchman, a meek mad scientist. Half of his cranium is replaced with a metal piece.
- Sonia: A Hindi girl, classmate of Matt. He has a large crush on her.
- Socrates: A bully from Matt's class.

== Broadcast ==
Matt's Monsters debuted in 2008 in France, and in 2009 in other countries. The series was broadcast on the Starz Kids & Family cable network for the United States from 2012 to 2014.
