= Ripley's Believe It or Not!: The Animated Series =

- Title card
- Genre: Action; Adventure
- Based on: Ripley's Believe It or Not! by Robert Ripley
- Directed by: François Brisson
- Voices of: Tedd Dillon; Rick Jones; Jennifer Morehouse
- Composer: Milan Kymlicka
- Countries of origin: France; Canada
- Original languages: French; English
- No. of seasons: 1
- No. of episodes: 26

Production
- Executive producers: Micheline Charest; Ronald A. Weinberg
- Producer: Cassandra Schafhausen
- Running time: 24 minutes
- Production companies: Alphanim; CINAR; Gimages; Valor 4

Original release
- Network: France 3 (France); Family Channel (Canada)
- Release: June 14, 1999 – 1999

Related
- Ripley's Believe It or Not!; Ripley's Believe It or Not!

Ripley's Believe It or Not!: The Animated Series (also known simply as Ripley's Believe It or Not!) is an animated television series based solely on the brand of Ripley's Believe It or Not!. The series was produced by Alphanim and CINAR for Family Channel and France 3. 26 episodes were produced, and were aired on Fox Family Channel beginning on July 14, 1999. The series is about three young people, one of whom was Robert Ripley's fictional nephew, who travel the world to discover unexplained mysteries and unusual items. It is cited as the only animated series to have ever been based on the brand.

== Cast ==
- Tedd Dillon as Michael Ripley
- Rick Jones as Cyril Barker
- Jennifer Morehouse as Samantha Seaver

=== Additional voices ===
- Bonnie Mak as Suzi
- Rick Miller
- Sonja Ball
- Robert Brewster
- Mark Camacho
- Ellen David
- Luis de Cespedes
- Carlo Essagian
- Dean Hagopian
- Kim Handysides
- A.J. Henderson
- Neil Kroetsch
- George Morris
- Tom Rack
- Harry Standjofski
- Jeannie Walker
- Russell Yuen

== Episodes ==
- The Daruma Dolls
- The Vampire Kit
- The Golden Helmet of Ur
- Curse of the Pharaoh's Tomb
- The Lie Detector
- The Million Year Old Egg
- Ghost of the Mystery House
- Eternity for Sale
- And Now the Weather
- Love's Many Charms
- The Lama's Skull
- Wattam the Warriors' Mask
- The First Artifact
- Well Doon, Cyril!
- A Dragon's Lullaby
- Heads I Win, Tails You Lose
- A Flare for Fashion
- A Helping Hand
- In His Uncle's Footsteps
- Can't See the Forest for the Trees
- With the Strength of Ten
- Follow Your Dreams
- The Sweet Taste of Revenge
- The Evil Eye
- Hate Never Sleeps
- Peace for a Princess

== Broadcast history ==
The show was broadcast on France 3 in France and Family Channel, as well as Fox Family Channel in the United States, beginning on July 14, 1999.

The show was then broadcast in reruns on This TV as part of Cookie Jar Toons from 2008 to 2009.

== Home media ==
In 2011, Mill Creek Entertainment released 5 episodes of the show on DVD as part of their deal with Cookie Jar Group in Region 1, under the name "Do You Believe?". An episode was also included as part of Cookie Jar's Halloween Cartoon Collection.

The show used to be available on iTunes, but as of 2023, it's currently available on Vudu, Google Play, and YouTube.
