= Colin Thibert =

French writer (born 1951)

Pierre-Colin Thibert is a Swiss writer and screenwriter for television. He was born in 1951 in Neuchâtel. In 2002, he received the SNCF Polar award for Royal Cambouis (Série Noire, Gallimard). His 2019 novel Torrentius, published by Editions Héloïse d'Ormesson, received the Roland de Jouvenel Prize awarded by the Académie française.

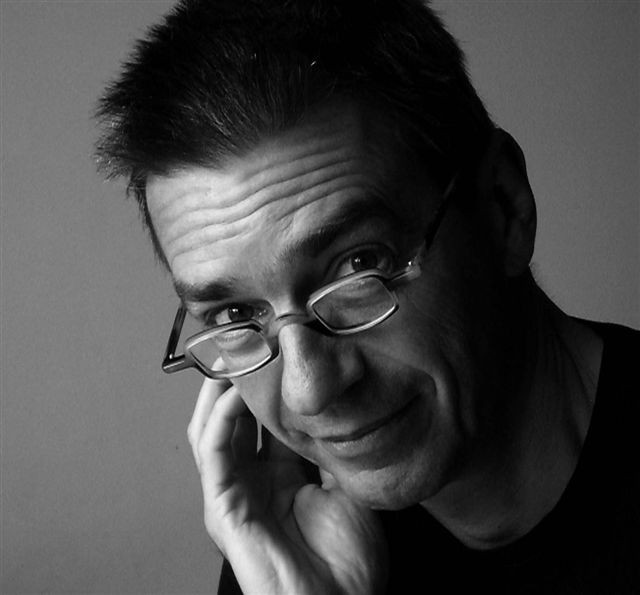
Photograph of Pierre Colin Thibert
