= High in the Clouds (film) =

Upcoming film by Toby Genkel

- Teaser poster
- Directed by: Toby Genkel
- Written by: Jon Croker
- Based on: High in the Clouds by: Paul McCartney; Geoff Dunbar; Philip Ardagh
- Produced by: Paul McCartney; Nicolas Atlan; Sidonie Dumas; Terry Kalagian; Michael Lynne; Christophe Riandee; Bob Shaye; Michele Anthony; David Blackman
- Starring: Himesh Patel; Celine Dion; Hannah Waddingham; Paul McCartney; Idris Elba; Lionel Richie; Ringo Starr; Jimmy Fallon; Clémence Poésy; Pom Klementieff; Alain Chabat
- Music by: Michael Giacchino (score); Paul McCartney (songs and themes)
- Production companies: Gaumont Animation; MPL Communications; Unique Features; PolyGram Entertainment
- Distributed by: Sky Cinema (United Kingdom); Gaumont (France)
- Release date: October 13, 2027 (France)
- Countries: United States; United Kingdom; France
- Language: English
- Budget: €28 million ($30 million)

High in the Clouds is an upcoming animated musical adventure comedy film directed by Toby Genkel and written by Jon Croker. It is based on the novel of the same name by Paul McCartney, Geoff Dunbar and Philip Ardagh, produced by Gaumont Animation and distributed by Gaumont in France. The film stars Himesh Patel, Celine Dion, Hannah Waddingham, Paul McCartney, Idris Elba, Lionel Richie, Ringo Starr, Jimmy Fallon, Clémence Poésy, Pom Klementieff and Alain Chabat.

== Premise ==
High in the Clouds centers on a whimsical teenage squirrel named Wirral who finds himself pulled into an eccentric team of teenage rebels, after he accidentally offends a tyrannical owl leader named Gretsch that steals the voice of anyone who upstages her.

== Voice cast ==
- Himesh Patel as Wirral, a squirrel
- Hannah Waddingham as Gretsch, a bossy diva owl
- Idris Elba as Barrel
- Pom Klementieff as Mina
- Paul McCartney as McKenzie
- Ringo Starr as Roy
- Lionel Richie as Gladstone
- Alain Chabat as Bigsby
- Jimmy Fallon as Froggo
- Celine Dion as Sugartail, Wirral's mother
- Clémence Poésy as Doris

== Production ==
First announced back in 2013, the film originally had Tony Bancroft on board as director with a script written by Josh Klausner. It had a planned release for 2015 in theaters with Lady Gaga contributing to its soundtrack with an original song. The film was optioned by Gaumont in 2017 after its original production company RGH Entertainment closed its Woodland Hills offices. Jon Croker was set to write the script in 2018.

In December 2019, it was announced that streaming company Netflix partnered up with Gaumont's subsidiary animation studio to co-produce. Timothy Reckart signed on as director with former Beatle singer and author Paul McCartney serving as producer and songwriter on composing original songs and score for the film. Canadian animation studio Tangent Animation was tapped to animate the film, however, by August 4, 2021, the studio shut down, with work on the film halting as well; Netflix was reportedly displeased with Tangent's work.

In July 2023, Netflix dropped their involvement, reverting the film back to an independent production. In October of that year, Toby Genkel replaced Reckart as director, and Michael Giacchino was announced to compose the new score. The film's production commenced around early 2024.

In May 2025, the cast was officially revealed.

== Release ==
High in the Clouds is scheduled to be released in France on October 13, 2027, with release dates for the United States and the United Kingdom yet to be announced. Although Gaumont and Sky Cinema are planned for distribution in France and the United Kingdom respectively, the film does not yet have a distributor for the United States.
