= Dirty Bertie =

Dirty Bertie may refer to:

- Edward VII, Albert Edward (1841-1910) King of the United Kingdom and the British Dominions, and Emperor of India
- Bert Olmstead (1926–2015), a Canadian professional ice hockey player, known as Dirty Bertie
- Dirty Bertie, a short story in More Grizzly Tales for Gruesome Kids, 2001, by British author Jamie Rix
- Dirty Bertie, 2002, books for younger readers by David Roberts

- Alan MacDonald (writer) later books
