= Theanne Griffith =

Neuroscientist and award-winning author

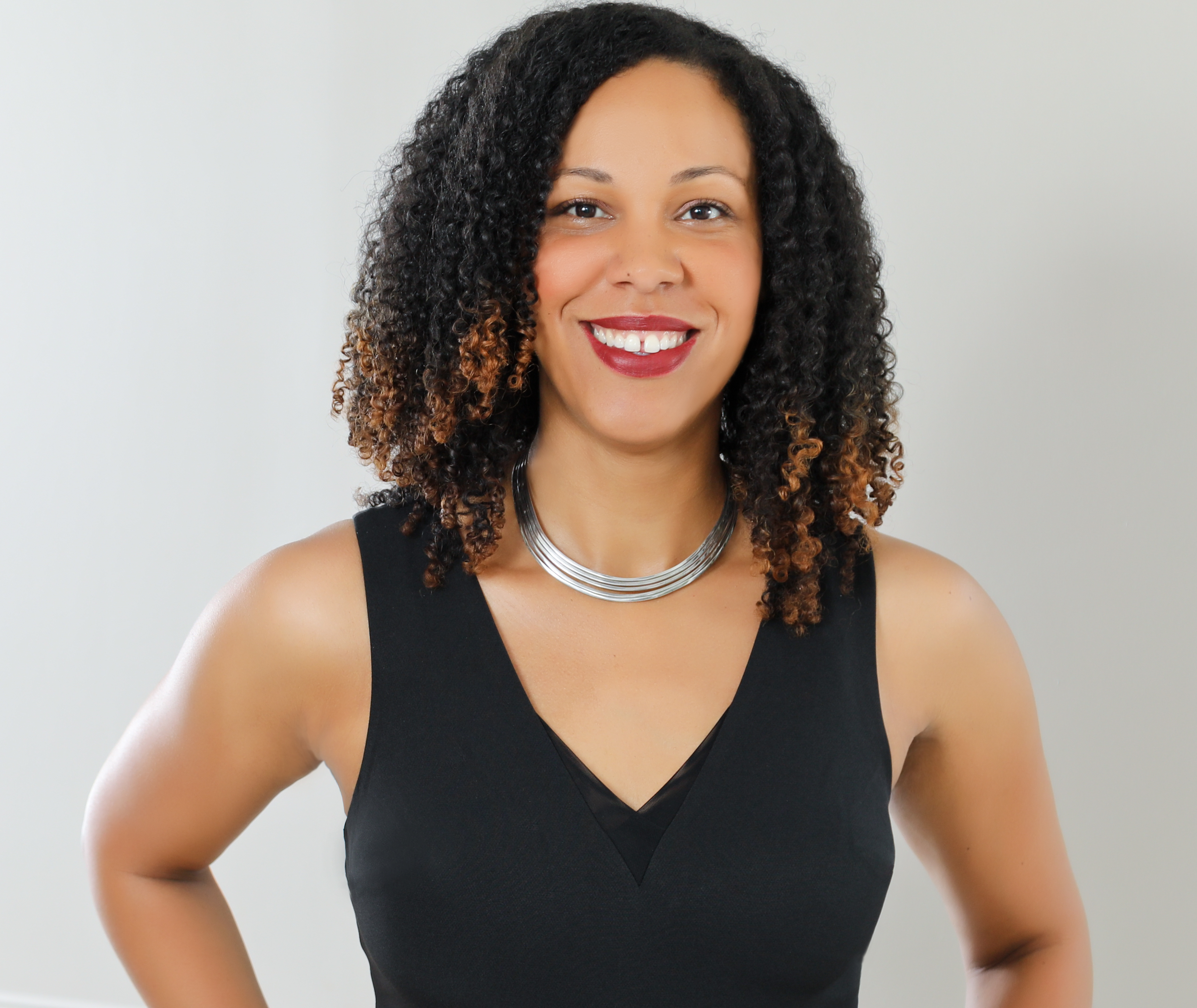
- Education: Smith College, Northwestern University
- Known for: Neurophysiology, Molecular mechanisms of thermal sensations, "The Magnificent Makers" children's book series, "Ada Twist, Scientist: The Why Files" children's book series
- Scientific career
- Institutions: University of California, Davis, Columbia University, Pontifical Catholic University of Chile
- Website: Theanne Griffith, Ph.D.: Neuroscientist and Children’s Book Author

Theanne Griffith is an American neuroscientist and children's book author. She is an associate professor of Physiology and Membrane Biology at the University of California, Davis.

== Background ==
Theanne Griffith was born in Pennsylvania in 1986. Her mother and father were both professors; her mother taught sociology and her father taught economics. Griffith was raised in Alexandria, Virginia, and attended West Potomac High School.

== Education ==
Griffith graduated from Smith College in 2008 where she majored in neuroscience and Spanish. At Smith, Griffith participated in scientific research all four years of her undergraduate career. The work that Griffith did at Smith involved GABA receptors and their roles as anesthetic targets to understand menthol and propofol. This was done using two-electrode voltage clamps. Also during her time at Smith, Griffith was able to study abroad at Pontifical Catholic University of Chile in 2007. There, she used biochemical techniques in her research, such as western blots and transgenic mouse models. Griffith was later invited back to the university in Chile for a post-baccalaureate program from 2008 to 2010.

Griffith returned to the United States and attended Northwestern University for her Ph.D. in Neuroscience, where she worked under Geoffrey T. Swanson. Her research involved a return to electrophysiology, using the patch clamp technique to measure the electric current of glutamate receptors and to investigate the modulation of receptor tyrosine kinases by auxiliary protein subunits.

== Career and research ==
During her postdoctoral training, Griffith joined Ellen Lumpkin's lab at Columbia University in the Department of Physiology & Cellular Biophysics, where she researched mechanosensation and how tactile sensations are sent. Griffith's postdoctoral research specifically examined the role of tetrodotoxin-sensitive sodium channels on action potentials in the presence of menthol-sensitive vesicular glutamate transporter 3 activity. In short, Griffith found that compared to menthol-insensitive Vglut3 neurons, menthol-sensitive Vglut3 neurons have a more heightened excitability. This phenomenon is intensified for menthol-sensitive neurons when tetrodotoxin-sensitive sodium channels subunits drive action potential firing. Taken together, these results provide a neurological explanation for the historical use of menthol as an analgesic and fever reducer.

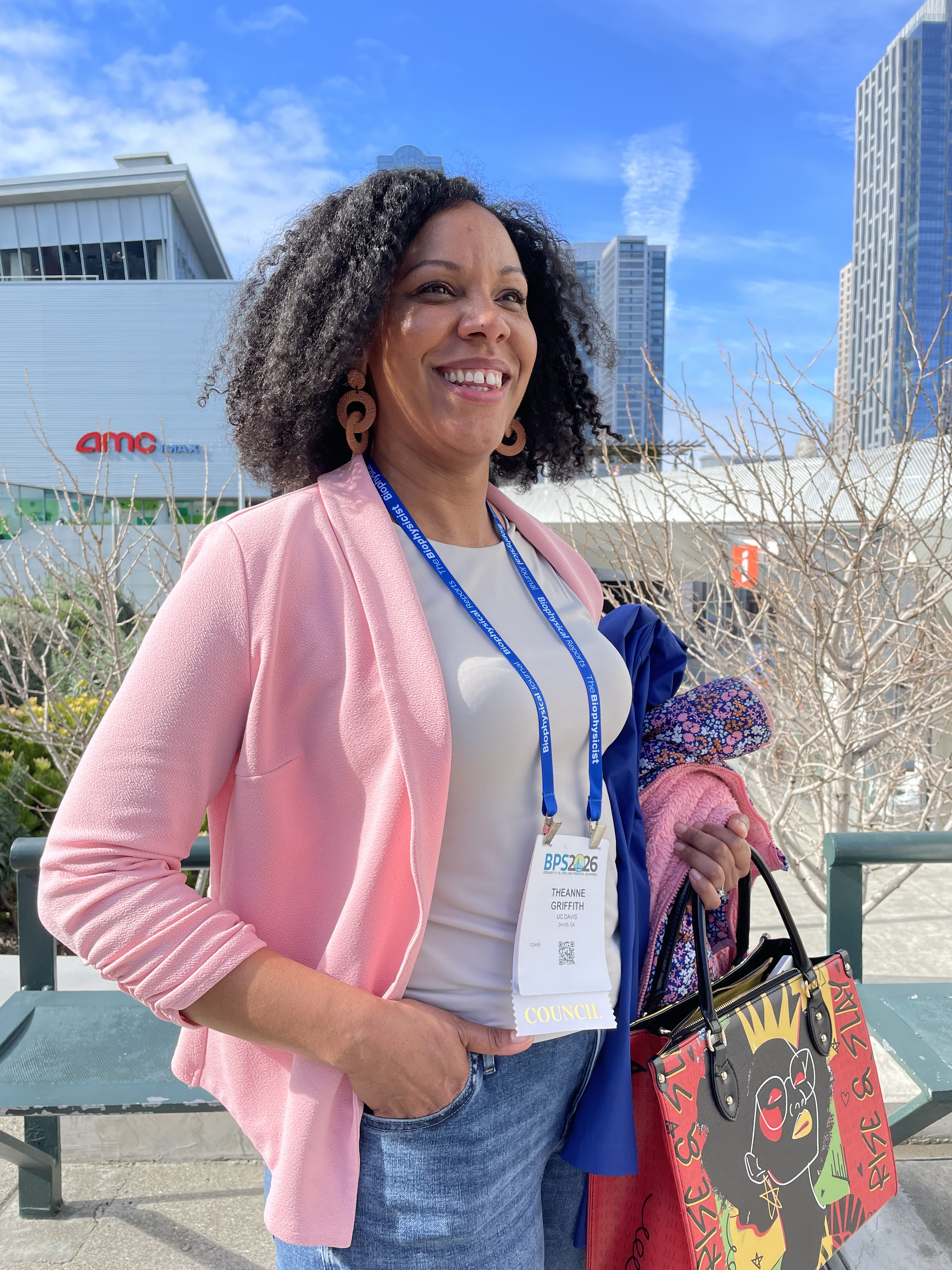
Griffith at the 2026 Biophysical Society Meeting in San Francisco

Griffith's first academic appointment was in the department of Pharmacology, Physiology & Neuroscience at Rutgers University as an instructor from 2019 to 2020. She then joined the Department of Physiology and Membrane Biology at the University of California, Davis as an assistant professor in the Department of Physiology and Membrane Biology in 2020, where she is still on the faculty today. The Griffith Lab studies mammalian thermosensation to determine which ion channels are critical in health and disease. A variety of methodological techniques are used in the lab including patch clamp, molecular profiling, as well as a variety of imaging and genomic techniques on primarily mice model organisms. Griffith found that Nav1.1 is a critical mediator of excitability, suggesting that it could be contributing to cold-sensing in vivo.

=== Honors and awards ===
(source)

- 2026: Smith College Smith Medal
- 2025: Biophysical Society Elected member of Council
- 2024: Society for Neuroscience Science Educator Award
- 2024: Sloan Research Fellowship
- 2020: University of California, Davis CAMPOS Faculty Scholars
- 2018: Columbia University First Prize Poster Presentation Award Recipient, Thompson Family Foundation 3rd Annual Symposium in Translational Sensory Neuroscience
- 2016: Biophysical Society Inclusion and Diversity Travel Award
- 2013 - 2014: Northwestern University Center for Leadership, Leadership Fellow
- 2013: Harvard Medical School New England Science Symposium, Ruth and William Silen, M.D. First Prize Poster Presentation Award Recipient
- 2013: Northwestern University Kellogg School of Management Management for Scientists and Engineers Certificate Program
- 2012: Cold Spring Harbor Laboratory Ion Channel Physiology Summer Course
- 2011 - 2014: Society for Neuroscience Neuroscience Scholars Program, Diversity Fellow

== Books ==
In addition to her research, Griffith wrote The Magnificent Makers, a STEM-themed children's book series targeted towards children ages 7–10. Griffith began writing her first series, The Magnificent Makers while on maternity leave. The series was nominated for the Kid's Book Choice Award and the Florida Sunshine State Young Reader's Award in 2021. The series comprises nine books: How to Test a Friendship, Brain Trouble, Riding Sound Waves, The Great Germ Hunt, Race Through Space, Storm Chasers, Human Body Adventure, Go Go Green Energy, and Rolling Through the Rock Cycle. The books include interactive exercises and at-home experiments for readers to complete. In the School Library Journal, Jessica Trafton described How to Test a Friendship as “great for kids who are looking for an adventure that isn’t scary. The science theme is fun, educational, and age-appropriate for the intended audience.” Griffith also co-authored the Ada Twist, Scientist: The Why Files series - a non-fiction series following a black girl scientist. It is the novel companion to the Netflix show, Ada Twist, Scientist. Both the Netflix show and the novel are based on the original picture-book series Ada Twist, Scientist. The three books in the series are Exploring Flight, All About Plants!, and The Science of Baking. Griffith has had stories and interviews published about her in news outlets such as NPR and Today.

=== Published work ===
- Griffith T, Swanson G (2015). "Identification of critical functional determinants of kainate receptor modulation by auxiliary protein Neto2". Journal of Physiology. 593 (22): 4815–4833. doi:10.1113/JP271103. PMC 4650415. PMID 26282342.
- Griffith T, Docter T, Lumpkin E (2019). "Tetrodotoxin-Sensitive Sodium Channels Mediate Action Potential Firing and Excitability in Menthol-Sensitive Vglut3-Lineage Sensory Neurons". Journal of Neuroscience. 39 (36): 7086–7101. doi:10.1523/JNEUROSCI.2817-18.2019. PMC 6733551. PMID 31300524.
- The Magnificent Makers: How to Test a Friendship, Random House, 2020. ISBN 9780593122983
- The Magnificent Makers: Brain Trouble, Random House, 2020. ISBN 9780593123010
- The Magnificent Makers: Riding Sound Waves, Random House, 2020. ISBN 9780593123102
- The Magnificent Makers: The Great Germ Hunt, Random House, 2021. ISBN 9780593379608
- Ada Twist, Scientist: The Why Files: Exploring Flight, Amulet Books, 2021. ASIN B09BFB1HJ6
- Muñoz M, Griffith T, Contreras J (2021). "Mechanisms of ATP release in pain: role of pannexin and connexin channels". Purinergic Signalling. 17 (4): 549–561. doi:10.1007/s11302-021-09822-6. PMC 8677853. PMID 34792743.
- The Magnificent Makers: Race Through Space, Random House, 2022. ISBN 9780593379639
- Ada Twist, Scientist: All About Plants, Amulet Books, 2022. ASIN B09M5XHM29
- Ada Twist, Scientist: The Science of Baking, Amulet Books, 2022. ASIN B09S6H49Q4
- The Magnificent Makers: Storm Chasers, Random House, 2022. ISBN 9780593563076
