= Ada Twist, Scientist (TV series) =

American animated television series

- Genre: Musical; Comedy; Fantasy
- Based on: Ada Twist, Scientist by: Andrea Beaty; David Roberts
- Developed by: Chris Nee
- Voices of: Amanda Christine; Kaya Jackson; Candace Kozak; Nicholas Crovetti; Corey J
- Theme music composer: Kay Hanley; Michelle Lewis; Dan Petty
- Opening theme: "Ada Twist, Scientist Theme" by Renée Elise Goldsberry
- Composers: Paul Buckley; Andy Strummer
- Country of origin: United States
- Original language: English
- No. of seasons: 4
- No. of episodes: 41 (62 segments)

Production
- Executive producers: Chris Nee; Barack Obama; Michelle Obama; Andrea Beaty; Mark Burton; Tonia Davis; David Roberts; Priya Swaminathan
- Producers: Nayanshi Shaw; PeeDee Shindell
- Animators: Liam Meade; Alexandre Jun Sokabe
- Editors: John Cruise; Conor Gillespie; Patrick Thornton
- Running time: 25–29 minutes
- Production companies: Laughing Wild; Higher Ground Productions; Wonder Worldwide; Brown Bag Films; Netflix Animation Studios

Original release
- Network: Netflix
- Release: September 28, 2021 – April 22, 2023

Ada Twist, Scientist is an animated preschool television series, based on the eponymous book series by Andrea Beaty and David Roberts. Developed and executive produced by Chris Nee for Netflix, the series premiered on September 28, 2021. A second season was released on January 25, 2022, followed by a third season on September 12, 2022, and a fourth and final season on April 22, 2023.

== Characters ==
=== Main ===
- Ada Twist (voiced by Amanda Christine in Seasons 1-3 and Kaya Jackson in Season 4) is an intellectual 9-year-old girl, and a scientist. She's smart, kindhearted, sensitive, and always sweet. Her catchphrases are "Loading the Lab!", "Wasn't that cool? Science is the best.", and "We don't quit, we got grit!" She has her own magic lab and her big book of discoveries and inventions. Her favorite animal is a ladybug.
- Iggy Peck (voiced by Nicholas Crovetti) is a fearful 8-year-old boy, and an architect. He's caring, extremely nervous, shy, quiet, and easygoing. His favorite animal is a whale shark.
- Rosie Revere (voiced by Candace Kozak) is an energetic 7-year-old girl, and an engineer. She's funny, a bit bossy, positive, and confident. She is also tomboyish which is what makes her always have her red bandanna with white polka dots all the time. Her favorite animal is a unicorn.
- Benny B. (voiced by Corey J) is an optimistic 10-year-old boy, the newcomer of the show's fourth season, and a technician. He always comes up with great ideas and has a robotic dog built by himself. Ever since he moved into town, he misses his old life but thanks to Ada and friends, they helped him find his way back home. He is the only character to not have a favorite animal.

=== Supporting ===
- Arthur Twist (voiced by Terrence Little Gardenhigh) is Ada's 11-year-old brother who loves magic and sports. He's a bit bored and cool. He has a pet lizard, named Lil Liz.
- Aisha Twist (voiced by Susan Kelechi Watson) is Ada and Arthur's mother.
- Amari Twist (voiced by Taye Diggs) is Ada and Arthur's father.
- Mushu Kitty (voiced by Frank Welker) is Ada's pet cat.
- Bianca "Bee Bee" (voiced by Nia Thompson) is Benny's 4-year-old sister who loves tea parties. She was born without a right hand, but has a robotic right hand and likes it.

== Episodes ==
=== Series overview ===
Series overview
Season	Segments	Episodes	Originally released
1	12	6	September 28, 2021
2	12	6	January 25, 2022
3	16	8	September 12, 2022
4	22	21	April 22, 2023

=== Season 1 (2021) ===
No. overall	No. in season	Title	Directed by	Written by	Storyboard by	Original release date
1	1	"A Fort of One's Own"	Jean Herlihy	Chris Nee	Mȧrten Jönmark	September 28, 2021
1	1	"Twelve Angry Birds"	Seamus O'Toole	Robert Vargas	Valentina Delmiglio	September 28, 2021
When Ada and Friends try to lock Arthur's fort, they use brainstorm to free him.
2	2	"Movie Night"	Gabrielle Meyer	Alan Moran	Micha Cohen	September 28, 2021
2	2	"The Banana Peel Problem"	Seamus O'Toole	Ivory Floyd	Dan Nosella	September 28, 2021
3	3	"Cake Twist"	Alan Moran	Kerri Grant	Dan Nosella	September 28, 2021
3	3	"Garden Party"	Alan Moran	Gabrielle Meyer	Valentina Delmiglio	September 28, 2021
4	4	"Bird's Eye View"	Alan Moran	Kerri Grant	Gaia Ruggenini	September 28, 2021
4	4	"Sleeping Duty"	Seamus O'Toole	Robert Vargas	Sherwin Macario	September 28, 2021
5	5	"Sight of Music"	Alan Moran	Robert Vargas	Micha Cohen	September 28, 2021
5	5	"Rain Day"	Seamus O'Toole	Jennifer Hamburg	Bob Baxter	September 28, 2021
6	6	"The Great Stink"	Seamus O'Toole	Gabrielle Meyer	Bob Baxter	September 28, 2021
6	6	"Rosie's Rockin' Pet"	Alan Moran	Jennifer Hamburg	Sherwin Macario	September 28, 2021

=== Season 2 (2022) ===
No. overall	No. in season	Title	Directed by	Written by	Storyboard by	Original release date
7	1	"The Curious Case of Lil' Liz"	Jean Herlihy	Chris Nee	Mȧrten Jönmark	January 25, 2022
7	1	"Cat on a Hot Twist Roof"	Seamus O'Toole	Robert Vargas	Valentina Delmiglio	January 25, 2022
8	2	"Ada Twist Magicianist"	Gabrielle Meyer	Alan Moran	Micha Cohen	January 25, 2022
8	2	"Bend It Like Arthur"	Seamus O'Toole	Ivory Floyd	Dan Nosella	January 25, 2022
9	3	"Oh Parachute"	Alan Moran	Kerri Grant	Dan Nosella	January 25, 2022
9	3	"Meltdown"	Alan Moran	Gabrielle Meyer	Valentina Delmiglio	January 25, 2022
10	4	"Show Me the Bunny"	Alan Moran	Kerri Grant	Gaia Ruggenini	January 25, 2022
10	4	"A Kite Above the Rest"	Seamus O'Toole	Robert Vargas	Sherwin Macario	January 25, 2022
11	5	"Skate On"	Alan Moran	Robert Vargas	Micha Cohen	January 25, 2022
11	5	"Ada's Cure for the Common Conundrum"	Seamus O'Toole	Jennifer Hamburg	Bob Baxter	January 25, 2022
12	6	"Mind Over Muscle"	Seamus O'Toole	Gabrielle Meyer	Bob Baxter	January 25, 2022
12	6	"Iggy Gettin' Diggy With It"	Alan Moran	Jennifer Hamburg	Sherwin Macario	January 25, 2022

=== Season 3 (2022) ===
No. overall	No. in season	Title	Directed by	Written by	Storyboard by	Original release date
13	1	"Ready, Set, Rosie"	Jean Herlihy	Chris Nee	Mȧrten Jönmark	September 12, 2022
13	1	"A Wheel with a Twist"	Seamus O'Toole	Niya Wright	Valentina Delmiglio	September 12, 2022
Rosie is set to participate in a race, but there's something wrong with her car. When Ada's cousin Nassan, who has autism, comes to visit, Ada accidentally breaks his favorite toy.
14	2	"The Whiz Kid Quiz"	Gabrielle Meyer	Alan Moran	Micha Cohen	September 12, 2022
14	2	"Glitter-tastrophe"	Seamus O'Toole	Ivory Floyd	Dan Nosella	September 12, 2022
15	3	"DadBot"	Alan Moran	Kerri Grant	Dan Nosella	September 12, 2022
15	3	"Into the Brainstorm"	Alan Moran	Gabrielle Meyer	Valentina Delmiglio	September 12, 2022
16	4	"Ice Creamed"	Alan Moran	Kerri Grant	Gaia Ruggenini	September 12, 2022
16	4	"Pitch Perfect"	Seamus O'Toole	Robert Vargas	Sherwin Macario	September 12, 2022
17	5	"Slow Your Roll"	Alan Moran	Robert Vargas	Micha Cohen	September 12, 2022
17	5	"The Amazing-Spider Twist"	Seamus O'Toole	Jennifer Hamburg	Bob Baxter	September 12, 2022
18	6	"Ghost Busted"	Seamus O'Toole	Gabrielle Meyer	Bob Baxter	September 12, 2022
18	6	"A Cold-Blooded Complication"	Alan Moran	Jennifer Hamburg	Sherwin Macario	September 12, 2022
19	7	"The Giggle Bug"	Alan Moran	Robert Vargas	Micha Cohen	September 12, 2022
19	7	"Dance Dance Twist Solution"	Seamus O'Toole	Jennifer Hamburg	Bob Baxter	September 12, 2022
20	8	"Bee the Change"	Seamus O'Toole	Gabrielle Meyer	Bob Baxter	September 12, 2022
20	8	"Battle of the Boogie Bots"	Alan Moran	Jennifer Hamburg	Sherwin Macario	September 12, 2022

=== Season 4 (2023) ===
No. overall	No. in season	Title	Directed by	Written by	Storyboard by	Original release date
21	1	"Benny Who"	Adrian Ignat	Kerri Grant	Ward Jenkins	April 22, 2023
When a new family moves to town, the team meets Benny, a sci-fi loving kid who misses his old life and wants to find a way to get back home.
22	2	"My Messy Valentine"	Seamus O'Toole	Gabrielle Meyer	Micha Cohen	April 22, 2023
Rosie built a special Valentine's Day catapult called "The Love Launcher," but it isn't working the way she hoped. Time to get organized and fix it!
23	3	"The Green Team"	Jean Herlihy	Gabrielle Meyer	Wickus Coetzee	April 22, 2023
Ada and the gang take Arthur on an out-of-this-world adventure to convince him that caring about Earth is cool -- and really important!
24	4	"The Right Puff"	Alan Moran	Niya Wright	Ward Jenkins	April 22, 2023
It's science to the rescue when Ada has a hair emergency on the day of Grandma and Pop-Pop's golden anniversary. Can she get her signature curls back?
25	5	"Monster Mash"	Adrian Ignat	Ivory Floyd	TJ House	April 22, 2023
While playing Goblins & Dragons with Arthur, Benny accidentally breaks a rare figurine, sending the kids on a science-fueled side quest to replace it.
26	6	"Soakchella"	Alan Moran	Gabrielle Meyer	April Peter	April 22, 2023
When he town's annual water battle is canceled due to drought, The Green Team works together to find a more sustainable way to have fun.
27	7	"Mixtape Remix"	Adrian Ignat	Monique D. Hall	Ilenia Gennari	April 22, 2023
Benny's planning a special gift from his dad's birthday that involves a mixtape, magnets -- and bringing his mom's amazing music back to life.
28	8	"Rodeo Rosie"	Seamus O'Toole	Ivory Floyd	Willem Samuel	April 22, 2023
To win the Silver Saddle trophy, Rosie must balance on a bucking bull for 8 whole seconds -- just like her mom and Great Aunt Rose. Can physics help?
29	9	"Dad to the Bone"	Alan Moran	Gabrielle Meyer	Wickus Coetzee	April 22, 2023
The grown-ups are making a racket while practicing for the Last Band Standing competition. Can the kids solve the problem with science?
30	10	"X Marks the Spot"	Adrian Ignat	Ivory Floyd	Micha Cohen	April 22, 2023
The friends hunt for treasure inside a dark cave, where their pal Pepper teaches them about echolocation -- and shows them there's another way to "see."
31	11	"Blue River Wedding"	Seamus O'Toole	Ivory Floyd	Micha Cohen	April 22, 2023
When a tornado touches down on the day of Sensei Dave and Jiu Jitsu Joe's wedding, the gang must think up a way for all of the guests to safely gather.
32	12	"A Twist in Time"	Adrian Ignat	Story by : Gabrielle; Teleplay by : Aydrea Walden	Ward Jenkins	April 22, 2023
33	13	"Old Mr. Oak"	Adrian Ignat	Gabrielle Meyer	Ilenia Gennari	April 22, 2023
34	14	"You Got Served"	Alan Moran	Ivory Floyd	Willem Samuel	April 22, 2023
35	15	"The Garbage Gobbler"	Seamus O'Toole	Ivory Floyd	Willem Samuel	April 22, 2023
36	16	"Planet Hunters"	Adrian Ignat & Alan Moran	Gabrielle Meyer	Wickus Coetzee	April 22, 2023
37	17	"Iggy's Memory Palace"	Seamus O'Toole	Ivory Floyd	Wickus Coetzee	April 22, 2023
38	18	"Dinnertime Deadline"	Alan Moran	Niya Wright	April Peter	April 22, 2023
39	19	"Getting It Write"	Adrian Ignat & Seamus O'Toole	Gabrielle Meyer	Micha Cohen	April 22, 2023
40	20	"More Scientists"	Katie Wise	Kerri Grant	TBA	April 22, 2023
A compilation of live-action segments featuring various scientists.
41	21	"Even More Scientists"	Katie Wise	Kerri Grant	TBA	April 22, 2023
Another compilation of live-action segments featuring various scientists.

== Production ==
The series was first announced in October 2020.

== Release ==
Ada Twist, Scientist was released on Netflix on September 28, 2021.

== LGBT representation ==
In the episode "Blue River Wedding" (Season 4 Episode 11), friends Ada Twist, Rosie Revere, Iggy Peck, and Benny B are helping Sensei Dave (voiced by George Takei) and Jiu Jitsu Joe (voiced by Guillermo Díaz) get ready for their wedding. This became controversial for more conservative parents.

== Reception ==
=== Accolades ===
The series received a 2022 Annie Award for Best Animated Television/Broadcast Production for Preschool Children.

The series also received a 2022 Children's and Family Emmy Awards award for Outstanding Preschool Animated Series.

The series also received a 2024 GLAAD Media Award for Outstanding Children's Programming for the episode "Blue River Wedding".
