= Awful End =

Book by Philip Ardagh

A House Called Awful End
- First edition (UK)
- Author: Philip Ardagh
- Illustrator: David Roberts
- Language: English (United Kingdom)
- Series: Eddie Dickens
- Genre: comedy
- Publisher: Faber and Faber
- Publication date: 2000
- Publication place: United Kingdom
- Media type: Book
- Pages: 119
- ISBN: 0-571-20354-X
- OCLC: 44562795
- LC Class: PZ7.A6776 Aw 2000
- Followed by: Dreadful Acts

Awful End (published in the US as A House Called Awful End) a 2000 children's novel by Philip Ardagh and the first book of the Eddie Dickens trilogy, which was followed by Dreadful Acts.

It was shortlisted for the 2002 Stockton Children's Book of the Year Award. The German translation by Harry Rowohlt won the Deutscher Jugendliteraturpreis in 2003.

The book is essentially a comical adventure about Eddie Dickens who has to go live with his great-uncle and great-aunt at Awful End as his parents have the yellow fever. Philip Ardagh uses clever puns and uses ambiguity of sentences to create a situation comedy. For example: 'Eddie took a seat next to Aunt. "Put that seat right back into its place!", screamed Aunt. So Eddie put the seat back in its place and sat down.'

== Philip Ardagh ==
Philip Ardagh is a children's author whose other titles include The Grunts, Grubtown Tales and Stick and Fetch. Many consider The Eddie Dickens Series one of his best works.

== Even Madder Aunt Maud ==
Even Madder Aunt Maud (full name: Maud MacMuckle; also known as EMAM) is one of the principal characters in Philip Ardagh's best-selling books 'The Eddie Dickens Trilogy'. Even Madder Aunt Maud is Mad Uncle Jack’s wife, making her Eddie’s Even Madder Great-Aunt Maud. She is to be seen anywhere and everywhere accompanied by her pet stoat, Malcolm. Although she is a bit mad, she always has perfectly reasonable explanations for things, or at least they are reasonable in her mind.

== Mad Uncle Jack ==
Mad Uncle Jack is the husband of Even Madder Aunt Maud. He is less mad than his wife hence his wife's name "Even Madder Aunt Maud". He is Eddie's Mad Great Uncle Jack.

== 20 years of Eddie Dickens ==
2020 sees the 20th anniversary of Eddie Dickens in print. The book (Awful End) was the first of six books beginning with Awful End and ending with Final Curtain.

== Other books in The Eddie Dickens Series ==
The following books in the series are:

- Dreadful Acts
- Terrible Times
- Dubious Deeds
- Horrendous Habits
- Final Curtain
