= David Roberts (illustrator) =

British children's illustrator

David Ian Roberts (born 8 May 1970) is a British children's illustrator. He has illustrated a large number of books in both black and white and colour. His black and white work mainly features in books for older readers and he has worked with such well-known authors as Philip Ardagh (on the Eddie Dickens and Unlikely Exploits series), G.P. Taylor (on the Mariah Mundi series), Chris Priestley (on the Tales of Terror series), Mick Jackson (on Ten Sorry Tales and The Bears of England), Susan Price (on the Olly Spellmaker series), Jon Blake (on the Stinky Finger series) and Tom Baker (on The Boy Who Kicked Pigs). Mouse Noses on Toast by Daren King won the Nestle Smarties Book Prize (ages 6–8 years) in 2006, after which King and Roberts collaborated on other titles including Peter the Penguin Pioneer, Sensible Hare and the Case of Carrots and The Frightfully Friendly Ghosties series.

Roberts also creates picture books for younger readers, some in collaboration with other writers. The best known may be those written by the 2011–2013 Children's Laureate, Julia Donaldson (Tyrannosaurus Drip, The Troll and most recently Jack and the Flum Flum Tree). Others include Iggy Peck, Architect by Andrea Beaty, Dear Tabby by Carolyn Crimi, Mrs Crump's Cat by Linda Smith, Hopping Mad by Michael Catchpool, Don't Say That Willy Nilly by Anna Powell and The Dunderheads by Paul Fleischman which was shortlisted for the Kate Greenaway Medal in 2010.

The Dirty Bertie character first appeared in two books penned by Roberts himself, Dirty Bertie in 2002 and Pooh! Is That You, Bertie? in 2004. Since then he has worked with Alan MacDonald to create a series for older readers with titles such as Burp, Fetch, Kiss and Pants.

His sister Lynn Roberts is also a writer and the siblings have collaborated on several retellings of fairy stories, including Rapunzel: A Groovy Fairy Tale, which was shortlisted for a Blue Peter Book Award, and Little Red: A Fizzingly Good Yarn, which was shortlisted for the Kate Greenaway Medal.

Roberts has also illustrated the series Wings & Co: The Fairy Detective Agency by Sally Gardner (Operation Bunny: the fairy detective agency's first case, Three Pickled Herrings and The Vanishing of Billy Buckle as of 2013) and the covers for a reprint of Enid Blyton's St Clare's books.

From 2015 Roberts began illustrating "The Bolds" series of books by Julian Clary.
