= Bill Mayer (illustrator) =

American illustrator

- Born: October 25, 1951 (age 74); Birmingham, Alabama, US
- Education: Ringling School of Art
- Known for: Illustration, fine artist
- Awards: Hamilton King Award, 2021; Multiple Society of Illustrators medal-winner
- Website: thebillmayer.com

Bill Mayer (born October 25, 1951) is an American illustrator who works in a variety of media and combinations of media, gouache, oil, airbrush, scratchboard, pen and ink and digital, as well as a variety of artistic styles. In 2021, he received the Hamilton King Award.

== Early life and education ==
Mayer was born in Birmingham, Alabama and until the age of five, lived in a home built by his parents on the property of his grandfather. He was the oldest of six children born to Louis A. Mayer and Lorene Cruse Mayer. The family would relocate to Memphis, where he first attended public school at Willow Oaks Elementary. At the age of eight the family moved to Rochester, New York and Mayer attended Cobbles Elementary in Penfield. The family moved to Decatur, Georgia in 1963, and Mayer attended Southwest Dekalb High School, Towers High School and graduated from Columbia High School in 1969.

Mayer began attending the Ringling School of Art at age 19, and it was there that he met his future wife, Lee. The Ringling curriculum primarily focused on drawing and painting. In his third year there, Mayer attended a class specific to a career in commercial illustration.

Mayer graduated from Ringling in 1972 at age 20. After graduation, he was employed by two art studios in Atlanta that had illustrators on staff: Graphics Studio, 1972–1974, and Whole Hog Studios, 1974–1976. At Graphics Studio, he worked alongside Thomas Blackshear, as well as designer Brad Copeland, who Mayer would work with later and win a Society of Illustrators Gold Medal under his art direction in 1987. Warren Weber showed Mayer the basics of air brushing during this period and demonstrated how to create and show thumbnails and sketches to clients for approval. Mayer decided that, in order to have his work look original, he would stop looking at other people's work and create what naturally came from his own imagination.

Early in 1977, Mayer dedicated himself entirely to work as a freelance illustrator. He incorporated under BillMayer, Inc. in 1979. Initially working for clients in the Atlanta area, his first corporate clients were Coca-Cola and Chick-fil-A.

== Career ==
Mayer's artwork has been commissioned by publications, institutions, and Fortune 500 corporations, and his creations have appeared in films, books, magazines, stamps, posters, advertising, and packaging. His clients have included the Smithsonian Institution in Washington, DC and a series of posters for the Tour de France, corporations such as DreamWorks Animation, Cartoon Network, Mattel, and Hasbro, among others.

=== Print ===
In 1998, the US Postal Service released the Bright Eyes stamps in which Mayer created his interpretations of a hamster, a fish, a dog and a parakeet, with designs by Carl Hermann. The USPS printed 180 million stamps in this collection.

Beginning in 1997, Mayer established a long-running relationship with the Hartford Stage, in which he was annually commissioned to do the poster for their production of A Christmas Carol. His 1999 poster and 2002 poster won gold medals from the Society of Illustrators. After 13 years, the final poster in the series appeared in 2010.

Between the years 1986 through 2016, Mayer created 17 cover illustrations for albums for the band The Rippingtons.

A reoccurring theme in Mayer's work is the use of animals, particularly frogs. The annual Dellas Graphics Calendar, art directed by Jim Burke, was a long-running frog-themed calendar and Mayer participated as a contributor in several of them. His 2008 contribution to the calendar was additionally used as the cover of Workbook in 2010; his 2011 contribution won the Patrick Nagel Award for Excellence from the Society of Illustrators West; and his 2005 contribution won a silver medal from the Society of Illustrators. Lightware Projectors used Mayer's depictions of frogs in an ongoing advertising campaign, as well as IHOP.

Mayer painted "Duck Judges", art for the U.S. Fish & Wildlife's 2022 Federal Duck Stamp contest. The piece depicts the stamp art judging process itself, except with ducks as judges. He was commissioned to do so by Last Week Tonight.

=== Product art ===
Working with the design agency Needham, Harper & Steers, Mayer created original packaging illustrations for Big League Chew, in 1980.

In 2004, Cartoon Network distributed character-based tarot cards illustrated by Mayer as a promotional item. The cards, art directed by Jay Rogers, were never sold in stores.

Mattel commissioned Mayer for board game packaging illustration in 2017 with the release of Flippin Frogs, art directed by Tim Douglas; in 2018 and with Rhino Rampage, with art direction by Mark Rosenbluh; and in 2005, with the release of Piranha Panic, art directed by Ninnette Wood.

In 2020, Orphan Barrel Whiskey Distilling Co. released a 24-year-old whiskey under the brand name Muckety-Muck, with label art by Mayer.

=== Film ===
Mayer provided character designs for the 2007 DreamWorks Animation film Bee Movie, as well as character designs for the 2011 20th Century Fox film Rio.

Mayer's poster illustration for the film General Orders No. 9, released in 2009, was art directed by Bob Persons.

== Bibliography ==
- Teeny Weenies: The Intergalactic Petting Zoo: And Other Stories, written by David Lubar, published by Starscape, 2019
- Teeny Weenies: Freestyle Frenzy: And Other Stories, written by David Lubar, published by Starscape, 2019
- Warrior Queens: True Stories of Six Ancient Rebels Who Slayed History, written by Vicky Alvear Shecter, published by Boyds Mills Press, 2019
- Animal Farm by George Orwell, Easton Press, 2017
- Super Bugs, written by Michelle Meadows, published by Scholastic, 2016
- Hide and Sheep, written by Andrea Beaty, published by Margaret K. McElderry Books, 2011
- All Aboard!A Traveling Alphabet, by Bill Mayer, concept by Chris L. Demarest, published by Margaret K. McElderry Books, 2008
- The Monster Who Did My Math, written by Danny Schnitzlein, published by Peachtree Publishers, 2007
- On My Very First School Day I Met..., written by Norman Stiles, published by Milk & Cookies, 2005
- A Giving Tale, written by Cleve Willcoxon, published by Willcoxon, Cleve 2006
- Brer Rabbit and Boss Lion, written by Brad Kessler, published by Spotlight Books, 2004
- A Walk in the Rain with a Brain, written by Edward Hallowell, published by HarperCollins, 2004
- Golf-O-Rama: The Wacky Nine Hole Pop-Up Mini-Golf Book, published by Hyperion Books 1994

== Exhibitions ==
=== Solo ===
- Memento Mori; Love, Art and Flowers that Bite, curated by Tim Jaeger, Patricia Thompson Gallery At Ringling College of Art in Sarasota, Florida, 2020

=== Group ===
Mayer has exhibited in multiple group shows including the Society of Illustrators Annual Show many times as well as others.

- Lucid Dreaming, Corpo Gallery, Santa Monica, California, curated by Beautiful Bizarre, 2021
- BLAB! 14th Annual (2019), 9th Annual (2014), 8th Annual (2013), Corpo Gallery, Santa Monica, California, curated by Monte Beauchamp
- The Art of Illustration, Parkland College Giertz Gallery, Champaign, Illinois, curated by Liza Wynette, 2018

== Honors and awards ==
Mayer has received numerous awards over the course of his career, including 10 Gold Medals, 2 Silver Medals and 145 Certificates of Merit from the Society of Illustrators; 10 Gold Medals, 4 Silver Medals, 18 Bronze, 4 Patrick Nagel Award of Excellence; 1 Best of Show and 183 Certificates of Merit from the Society of Illustrators West; 21 Certificates of Merit and 24 awards of excellence from 3X3; 123 Certificates of Design Excellence Show South; 17 Certificates of Distinction from Print; and 23 Awards of Excellence from Communication Arts.

- Hamilton King Award, Red Riding Hood, for Airbnb, art directed by Mallory Roynan, 2021
- Show Chair, 3X3 Annual No.15, 2018
- Gold Medal, Society of Illustrators West, poster art for the Steppenwolf Theatre Company, art directed by Andrew Rothstein, 2018
- Patrick Nagel Award for Excellence, poster art for Radio Flyer, art directed by Kevin Grady, 2018
- Spectrum Award for Excellence, City Beat News, poster for the Steppenwolf Theatre, 2016
- Gold Medal, Society of Illustrators, 2 Le Nouveau Chapeau de Marie an uncommissioned work, 2015
- The Jack Davis Distinguished Artist Award, Lamar Dodd School of Art, 2013
- Silver Medal, Society of Illustrators, Creative Carnival 2012, for Workbook, 2012
- The Patrick Nagel Award for Excellence, for The Death of Frogs 2, 2011
- Gold Medal, Society of Illustrators, Queen of Swords for Revista Piaui magazine, 2011
- 2 Gold Medals, Society of Illustrators West for an IBM editorial piece and for an NPR calendar art directed by Katie Burk,2011
- Joseph Morgan Henninger Best of Show award, poster for Hartford Stage,2011
- Silver Medal, Society of Illustrators, for All Aboard, art directed by Ann Bobco, 2008
- Gold Medal, Society of Illustrators for The Monster Who Did My Math, Peachtree Publishing, art directed by Lorain Joyner and Kathy Landweir, 2007
- Gold Medal, The National Addy's, Growers of America poster, 2006
- Silver Medal, Society of Illustrators, Dellas Graphics Frog Calendar illustration, 2005
- Gold Medal, Society of Illustrators, poster for A Christmas Carol, The Hartford Stage, art directed by Harry Hartofelis, 1999 and 2002
- Gold Medal, Society of Illustrators, Reading Skeleton, Charlotte Library System, art directed by Leigh Brinkley, 1994
- The Silver Funny Bone, Society of Illustrators, The Dog Fish, for Adweek, art directed by Kieth Lepkowski, 1988
- Silver Medal, Society of Illustrators, Ryder Truck Rentals, art directed by Tom Sapp art director at Burton Campbell, 1988
- Gold Medal, Society of Illustrators, art directed by Brad Copeland, 1985

== Personal life ==
Mayer and his wife Lee were married on May 18, 1972, and live in Decatur, Georgia. They have one son, born in 1974, and three grandchildren.
