= The Boy Who Kicked Pigs =

1999 novel by Tom Baker

- First edition.
- Author: Tom Baker
- Illustrator: David Roberts
- Cover artist: David Roberts
- Language: English
- Genre: novel
- Publisher: Faber and Faber
- Publication date: 1999
- Publication place: United Kingdom
- Media type: Print (Hardcover)
- ISBN: 0-571-19771-X
- OCLC: 42309269

The Boy Who Kicked Pigs is a short horror comedy novel by actor Tom Baker. The novel is subtitled, "A grotesque masterpiece", and is illustrated with line drawings by David Roberts.

== Plot ==
The novel begins by announcing that today will be the day that a young boy, Robert Caligari, dies. Robert is an extremely odd boy who cannot stop himself from kicking pigs. This begins as a private act of revenge against his sister, Nerys, who is always putting money in her own tin piggy bank. Robert is angry at Nerys constantly rattling the pig in front of him and so takes great pleasure in kicking the pig across the room whenever he is alone.

Robert's obsession with kicking pigs gets worse and one day, he kicks his sister's piggy bank out of the window, causing chaos for his neighbors and a local police officer. The last straw for Robert's mother is when he kicks a rather large woman's bagged pork chops, which she had just bought at the local butcher's shop.

After a local man finally gets revenge on Robert by throwing him over a church wall, Robert realizes that he hates the human race. While Robert's neighbors soon come to the conclusion that he is a nice young boy, he is plotting revenge. After poisoning his sister's food, he decides to trick an old blind man into crossing a road of busy traffic. Unfortunately for the old man, this proves fatal, yet nobody suspects Robert's involvement.

Robert engineers another, far worse, road accident involving a crossbow and a horseback rider in the next step of his evil plan, causing a massive explosion on a motorway that kills hundreds of people. However, in the process of doing so, he ends up falling in his secret hideaway and is impaled on stalagmites, ultimately being slowly devoured alive by rats.

== Adaptations ==
The book has been adapted for stage by theatre company Kill the Beast, and was performed at The Lowry, Greater Manchester, 21–23 June 2012, and at Jacksons Lane, London.
