= Columbia High School (Georgia) =

Public school in Atlanta, Georgia, United States

Location
- 2106 Columbia Drive; Decatur, DeKalb County, Georgia 30032; United States; 33°43′41.22″N 84°15′02″W

Information
- School type: Public High school
- Founded: 1966
- Status: Open
- Locale: Suburban, Large
- School district: DeKalb County Public Schools
- NCES District ID: 1301740
- NCES School ID: 130174000666
- Principal: Derrica Boochee-Davis
- Teaching staff: 63.00 (on an FTE basis)
- Grades: 9–12
- Enrollment: 877 (2024–25)
- Student to teacher ratio: 13.57
- Colors: Orange and blue
- Sports: Basketball, baseball, cheerleading, cross-country, football, golf, soccer, softball, swimming, volleyball, wrestling, and marching band
- Nickname: Eagles
- Feeder schools: Columbia Middle School
- Website: columbiahs.dekalb.k12.ga.us

Columbia High School (CHS) is a four-year public high school located in DeKalb County, Georgia, United States. It is in the Candler-McAfee neighborhood on the eastside of Atlanta. It is operated by DeKalb County Public Schools.

It opened in 1966. In 1991, the Mathematics, Science and Technology Magnet Programs were established at Columbia, which gave students in the Metro Atlanta area an opportunity to have a more focus-based education in these areas.

Columbia's mascot is the Eagle and its colors are orange and blue. The school motto is "One Team, One Dream!"

The school was given the Georgia School of Excellence award in 1996.

Extracurricular activities include athletics, marching and concert band, color guard, Future Business Leaders of America, Beta Club, and JROTC.

The boundary of Columbia High School neighbors those of Southwest Dekalb High School, Towers High School, and McNair High School.

== Attendance zone ==
The school serves portions of the Candler-McAfee (Zone 6) CDP, Belvedere Park, and Panthersville CDPs.

== Sports ==
=== Boys' basketball ===
Columbia High School is considered a national powerhouse in high school basketball. They have been ranked nationally by ESPN in numerous years.

The boys' basketball team has gone to the state championship every year since 2005. They are the first team in the history of Dekalb County to win more than four state basketball championships.

State Champions: 2005-2006 (AAAA), 2007-2008 (AAAA), 2009-2010 (AAA), 2010-2011 (AAA), 2011-2012 (AAA)

Region Champions: 2005-2006 (Region 5-AAAA), 2006-2007 (Region 6-AAAA), 2007–2008 (Region 6-AAAA), 2008-2009 (5-AAA), 2009-2010 (5-AAA), 2010-2011 (5-AAA), 2011-2012 (5-AAA)

In the 2009–2010 season, the girls' and boys' teams were AAA State champions in 2009–2010. They were the sixth team in the history of Georgia High School basketball to accomplish this feat. The girls' and boys' teams repeated this feat in the 2011–2012 season as they both won the Class AAA state titles.

The boys' basketball team has been coached by Dr. Phil McCrary since 1987. As of February 2011, he has posted a 502–183 record. He won his 500th career game at the Primetime Shootout in West Virginia on January 21, 2011, against Jamesville-Dewitt High School. Coach McCrary has sent more than 100 student athletes to Division I basketball programs, including NBA guard and former UGA basketball star Travis Leslie. Coach McCrary has received numerous coaching accolades, including:

- 2010 - Georgia Naismith Coach of the Year Award
- Georgia Sports Writers Association Class AAAA Coach of the Year Award - 1990, 2006, 2008, 2010
- Atlanta Journal-Constitution Coach of the Year - 1990, 2006, 2008, 2010
- Georgia Athletic Coaches Association Coach of the Year - 2006, 2010
- 2010 - selected as an Assistant Coach in the Jordan Brand Classic, Charlotte, North Carolina

=== Girls' basketball ===
The girls' basketball team won their first state championship in 2010. The 2010 season also marked the first time for a DeKalb County school to win both a boys' and a girls' title in the same season, as Columbia swept the Class AAA titles.

The girls' basketball team won their second Class AAA state championship in 2012. For the second time, the girls' and boys' teams swept the Class AAA championships.

The girls' basketball team won their third championship in 2013, in Class AAAA.

=== Girls' track ===
The girls' track team has won three state championships, in 1983, 1995 and 1996. One of the highlights of the girls' track program is Olympic gold medalist Gwen Torrence. She was the state champion in the 100 and 200 meters from 1980 to 1983, while running for Columbia.

=== Boys' track ===
The boys' track team has won two state championships, in 1980 and 1983.

=== Wrestling ===
Columbia High School has won five state championships in wrestling, in 1972, 1973, 1976, 1977, and 1988. Columbia had won 26 individual state titles as of March 2011. The wrestling team has finished in the top 10 in the state 19 times.

=== Boys' football ===
Columbia High School is yet to win a championship in boys' football. The team currently plays at Adams Memorial Stadium and Avondale Stadium.

== Music ==
=== Allman Brothers ===
On May 23, 1970, the Allman Brothers Band performed in the gymnasium of Columbia High School for the Junior-Senior Prom.

=== Stan Kenton ===
On March 12, 1973, Stan Kenton and the Stan Kenton Orchestra gave an afternoon workshop and an evening concert at DeKalb Community College South Campus (now called Georgia State University- Decatur Campus). The concert was sponsored by the Columbia High School Band Boosters as a fundraiser.

=== Braves baseball opener ===
On 4 April 1975, 200 members of the Columbia High School Band, Advanced Mixed Chorus, Drill Team, and Majorettes furnished the music for pre-game activities at the Atlanta Braves baseball opening game with the Houston Astros at Fulton Stadium.

=== Musical productions ===
The following musicals were produced and staged at Columbia:

- Carousel (1970)
- The Sound of Music (1973)
- West Side Story (1975)

=== Destruction of music library ===
During renovation of the school during 2004–2005, thousands of copies of sheet music were destroyed, wiping out the school's extensive music library of choral and band scores.

== Publications ==
- Aquila (yearbook), vol. 1, 1968-
- Columbia High School PTA Newsletter, vol. 1, no.1, 1968-
- Columbia Courier (school newspaper), 1969-1971
- Eagle's Echo (school newspaper), 1974-
- Columbia High School Literary Magazine, 1968-1971
- Witches' Brew (literary magazine), 1972-1973
- Eagle Talk, 1971-1972
- Grundee Gazette, c.1970-1974

== Notable alumni ==
- Erica Ash - actress, singer, model
- B.o.B - hip-hop artist
- James Banks III (born 1998) - basketball player in the Israeli Basketball Premier League
- Jadan Baugh - college football player for the Florida Gators
- Bryce Brown - basketball player in the Israeli Basketball Premier League
- Mark David Chapman - murderer of John Lennon
- Yung Chris - hip-hop artist
- Dave Edwards - NFL player
- Gerald Everett - NFL player, Chicago Bears
- Future - hip-hop artist
- Rory Graves - NFL player
- Glynn Harrison - NFL player
- Hoodrich Pablo Juan - hip-hop artist
- Chris Horton - basketball player for Hapoel Tel Aviv of the Israeli Basketball Premier League
- Travis Leslie - NBA guard, Free agent
- Bill Mayer - illustrator
- Kendall Newson - Miami Dolphins wide receiver, Agape Awards gospel music drummer
- Randy Scott - NFL player
- Eric Smith - NFL player, Free agent
- Rex Smith - singer and stage actor
- Gwen Torrence - track & field athlete, gold medalist in the 1992 and 1996 Summer Olympics
- Chris Tucker - actor and comedian
- Martha Zoller - columnist, media personality, author, and former Republican candidate
