= High in the Clouds =

Book by Paul McCartney, Geoff Dunbar and Philip Ardagh

- First edition
- Author: Paul McCartney; Philip Ardagh
- Illustrator: Geoff Dunbar
- Language: English
- Genre: Children's
- Publisher: Faber and Faber
- Publication date: 2005
- Publication place: United States
- Pages: 96 pp

High in the Clouds is a children's adventure novel written by musician/songwriter Paul McCartney and Philip Ardagh, illustrated by Geoff Dunbar, and published by Faber and Faber in October 2005. As writer/producer and animator/director, McCartney and Dunbar had collaborated on the 1984 animated film Rupert and the Frog Song, and High in the Clouds was scripted and sketched for several years by the two of them as another film.

== Synopsis ==
When the protagonist's home, Woodland, is attacked by human development, a young squirrel named Wirral is left without a home and without a family. Guided by his mother Sugartail's final words and aided by his such fellow animal friends like a frog named Froggo, Wirral goes on a quest for the secret island sanctuary of Animalia. Wirral finds himself in an epic journey filled with evil realities and wild dreams. He and his friends experience tragedy, war, joy and victory, all in the name of freedom and peace.

== Reception ==
The book has an overall theme of preserving nature and letting animals live free and in their natural habitat. In The Observer it was described as "a tale about the perils of unchecked global capitalism".

== Film adaptation ==
In 2013, it was reported that an animated feature film adaptation of the book was in development by producers Michael Lynne and Bob Shaye through their Unique Features banner and RGH Entertainment. Tony Bancroft was set to direct the film, written by Josh Klausner, and was originally going to have a theatrical release in 2015. The film was optioned by Gaumont. In 2019, it was announced Netflix had partnered up with Gaumont to co-produce. Jon Croker has written the script and Timothy Reckart would replace Bancroft as director while former Beatle singer and author Paul McCartney serves as executive producer and songwriter, of which he composed original songs and score for the film. In October 2023, Netflix dropped their involvement, reverting the film back to an independent production with Toby Genkel replacing Reckart as director, and Michael Giacchino re-composing the score. The film's production commenced around early 2024 and is expected to be released around 2026. It was originally scheduled for release on 2027.
