= Eric Smith (offensive lineman) =

American football player (born 1995)

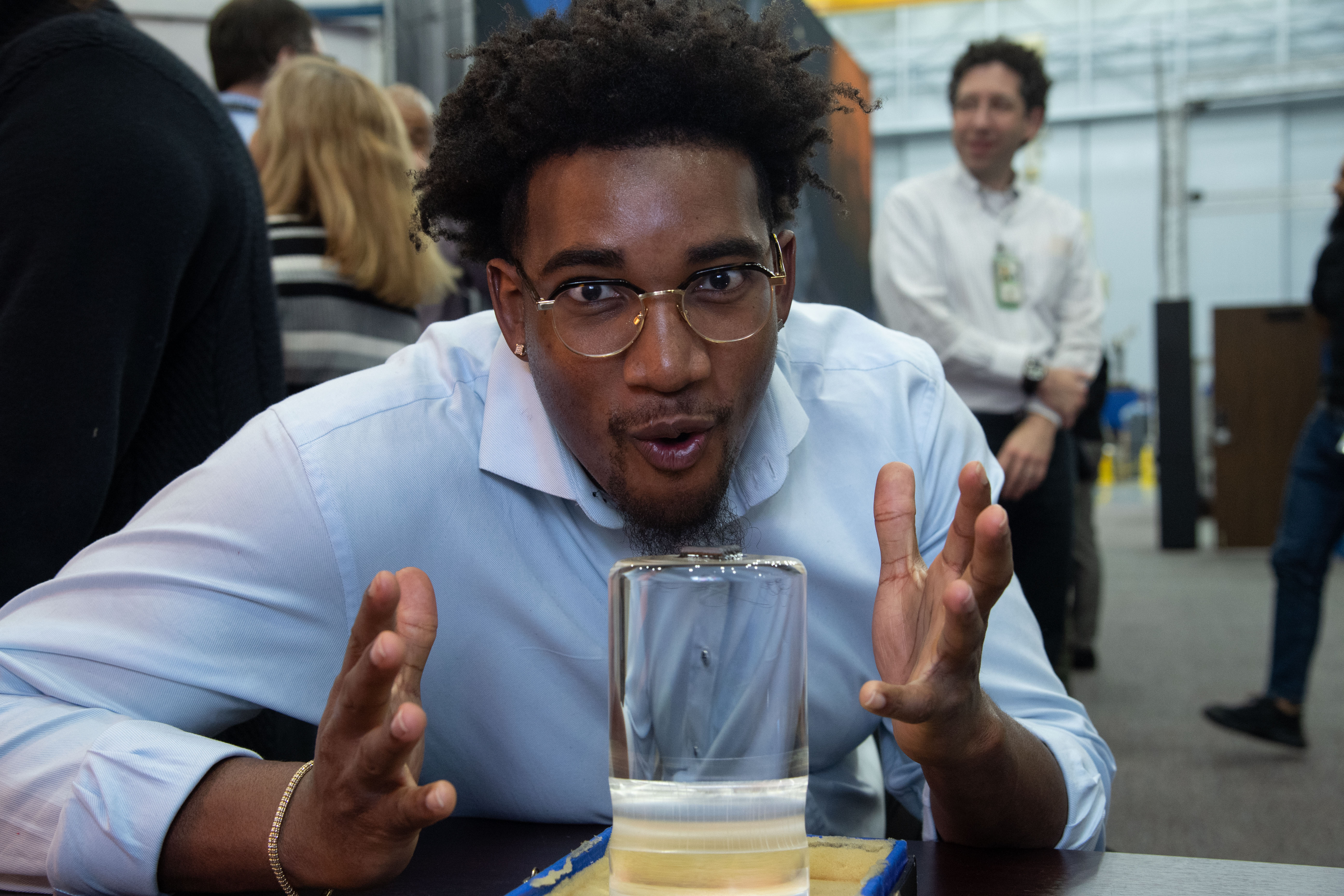
- Smith in 2020

Profile
- Position: Offensive tackle

Personal information
- Born: September 2, 1995 (age 31); Decatur, Georgia, U.S.
- Listed height: 6 ft 4 in (1.93 m)
- Listed weight: 321 lb (146 kg)

Career information
- High school: Columbia (Decatur)
- College: Virginia (2013–2016)
- NFL draft: 2017: undrafted

Career history
- Miami Dolphins (2017); New England Patriots (2018)*; New York Jets (2018); New York Giants (2019); Dallas Cowboys (2020); Arizona Cardinals (2021); New York Giants (2022)*; New York Jets (2022)*; Tennessee Titans (2022)*; New York Jets (2022); Calgary Stampeders (2024)
- * Offseason or practice squad member only

Career NFL statistics
- Games played: 4
- Stats at Pro Football Reference

Eric Maurice Smith Jr. (born September 2, 1995) is an American former professional football player who was an offensive tackle in the National Football League (NFL) and Canadian Football League (CFL). He played college football for the Virginia Cavaliers.

== Early life ==
Smith attended Columbia High School in Decatur, Georgia, where he was a three-star prospect. He committed to attend the University of Virginia in 2012.

== College career ==
Smith started in 32 games at the right tackle position at the University of Virginia. He graduated with a B.A. degree in May 2017.

== Professional career ==
Pre-draft measurables
Height	Weight	Arm length	Hand span	40-yard dash	10-yard split	20-yard split	Vertical jump	Broad jump	Bench press
6 ft 4 3/8 in (1.94 m)	312 lb (142 kg)	34 3/4 in (0.88 m)	9 3/8 in (0.24 m)	5.39 s	1.82 s	3.12 s	23.5 in (0.60 m)	8 ft 4 in (2.54 m)	26 reps
All values from Pro Day

=== Miami Dolphins ===
Smith signed with the Miami Dolphins as an undrafted free agent on May 5, 2017. After an impressive preseason, Smith made Miami's 53-man roster as a backup right tackle. He was placed on injured reserve on October 3, 2017. He was activated off injured reserve to the active roster on December 20, 2017.

On September 1, 2018, Smith was waived by the Dolphins.

=== New England Patriots ===
On September 3, 2018, Smith was signed to the New England Patriots' practice squad.

=== New York Jets (first stint) ===
On December 18, 2018, Smith was signed by the New York Jets off the Patriots practice squad. He was waived on August 31, 2019.

=== New York Giants (first stint) ===
On September 1, 2019, Smith was claimed off waivers by the New York Giants.

On September 5, 2020, Smith was waived by the Giants.

=== Dallas Cowboys ===
On September 9, 2020, Smith was signed to the Dallas Cowboys practice squad. He was elevated to the active roster on September 19 and September 26 for the team's weeks 2 and 3 games against the Atlanta Falcons and Seattle Seahawks, and reverted to the practice squad after each game. He signed a reserve/future contract with the Cowboys on January 4, 2021.

On August 31, 2021, Smith was waived by the Cowboys.

=== Arizona Cardinals ===
On September 7, 2021, Smith was signed to the Arizona Cardinals practice squad. He signed a reserve/future contract with the Cardinals on January 19, 2022. He was waived on August 4, 2022.

=== New York Giants (second stint) ===
On August 7, 2022, the Giants signed Smith. He was waived on August 29.

=== New York Jets (second stint) ===
On September 6, 2022, Smith signed with the practice squad of the Jets. He was released on October 18.

=== Tennessee Titans ===
On October 24, 2022, Smith was signed to the Tennessee Titans practice squad. He was released on November 15. He was re-signed to the practice squad six days later. On December 6, the Titans released Smith.

=== New York Jets (third stint) ===
On December 14, 2022, Smith was signed to the Jets' practice squad. He was promoted to the active roster on January 7, 2023. He was released on May 30, 2023.

=== Calgary Stampeders ===
On April 12, 2024, Smith signed with the Calgary Stampeders of the Canadian Football League (CFL). He started five games at left tackle in 2024 and spent the rest of the season on the practice roster. On March 10, 2025, Smith announced his retirement from the CFL.
