= Glynn Harrison =

American football player (born 1954)

No. 22
- Position: Running back

Personal information
- Born: May 25, 1954 (age 72); Atlanta, Georgia, U.S.
- Listed height: 5 ft 11 in (1.80 m)
- Listed weight: 191 lb (87 kg)

Career information
- High school: Columbia (Decatur, Georgia)
- College: Georgia (1972–1975)
- NFL draft: 1976: 9th round, 251st overall pick

Career history
- San Diego Chargers (1976)*; Kansas City Chiefs (1976)
- * Offseason or practice squad member only

Awards and highlights
- 2× First-team All-SEC (1974, 1975)

Career NFL statistics
- Rushing attempts: 16
- Rushing yards: 41
- Receptions: 1
- Receiving yards: 12
- Stats at Pro Football Reference

Glynn Alan Harrison (born May 25, 1954) is an American former professional football player who was a running back for one season with the Kansas City Chiefs of the National Football League (NFL). He was selected by the San Diego Chargers in the ninth round of the 1976 NFL draft after playing college football for the Georgia Bulldogs.

== Early life ==
Glynn Alan Harrison was born on May 25, 1954, in Atlanta, Georgia. He attended Columbia High School in Decatur, Georgia.

== College career ==
Harrison was a member of the Georgia Bulldogs of the University of Georgia from 1972 to 1975 and a three-year letterman from 1973 to 1975. He rushed 38 times for 173 yards and two touchdowns in 1973 while also catching one pass for five yards. In 1974, he recorded 149 carries for 959 yards and four touchdowns, and ten catches for 154 yards and two touchdowns. Harrison was named first-team All-SEC by the Associated Press (AP) for the 1974 season. As a senior in 1975, he rushed 131 times for 894 yards and five touchdowns, and caught five passes for 63 yards. He earned AP and United Press International first-team All-SEC honors that season.

== Professional career ==
Harrison was selected by the San Diego Chargers in the ninth round, with the 251st overall pick, of the 1976 NFL draft. He officially signed with the team on June 22. On August 3, 1976, it was reported that he had been waived.

Harrison was then claimed off waivers by the Kansas City Chiefs on August 5, 1976. He played in eight games for the Chiefs during the 1976 season, totaling 16 carries for 41 yards, one reception for 12 yards, and 13 kick returns for 278 yards. He was released on September 12, 1977.
