= Eddie Dickens =

Fictional character

Eddie Dickens is a character from a series of books written by the children's author Philip Ardagh. Eddie first appeared in Awful End (known as A House Called Awful End in the USA) and has appeared in a total of six books. Ardagh originally created Eddie Dickens in letters written to his nephew Ben.

== Books about Eddie ==
Eddie appears in:

- Awful End
- Dreadful Acts
- Terrible Times
- Dubious Deeds
- Horrendous Habits
- Final Curtain

== Eddie's Family ==
Notable Relatives include:

=== Mad Uncle Jack ===
Technically Eddie's Mad Great Uncle Jack. He is married to Even Madder Aunt Maud

=== Even Madder Aunt Maud ===
Mad Uncle Jack's wife. She is Eddie's Even Madder Great Aunt Maud. She carries a stuffed stoat 'Malcolm' around with her and regularly brandishes it as a weapon. Although she is mad she attempts to come up with reasonable explanations for her mad antics.

=== Malcolm/Sally ===
Even Madder Aunt Maud's Stuffed Stoat. Mad Uncle Jack believes the stoats name to be Sally. Although according to Even Madder Aunt Maud the stoat is named Malcolm. The incorrect use of Malcom's name runs thought the book.

=== Eddie's Parents ===
Eddie goes to live with his great-aunt and great-uncle because his parents catch a fever "that makes them turn yellow, go a bit crinkly round the edges and smell of old hot water bottles".

==== Eddie's Mother ====
Eddie's Mother is known as Mrs Dickens though in Final Curtain we discover her first name is Florinda.

==== Eddie's Father ====
Eddie's Father is known as Mr Dickens, though in Final Curtain we discover that his first name is Laudanum

== Illustrator ==
The Eddie Dickens series was illustrated by David Roberts. He provided the illustrations for all six books in the series.

== More about the Author ==
Philip Ardagh is an English children's author, primarily known for this series. He has written more than 100 books including adult fiction and children's non-fiction. Eddie Dickens was one of his early works and the first instalment was published in 2000

== 20 Years of Eddie Dickens ==
2020 is the 20th anniversary of Eddie Dickens in print. The first book Awful End was published in the year 2000. The Eddie Dickens Trilogy has a newly published special 20th anniversary edition.

== Eddie Dickens Books ==
Eddie Dickens is now published in two books with three of the stories in each. These are The Eddie Dickens Trilogy and The Further Adventures of Eddie Dickens

== Awards ==
The first book Awful End won the Deutscher Jugendliteraturpreis a German literary prize. This version was translated into German by Harry Rowohlt a highly respected German translator.
