= Ada Twist, Scientist =

Picture book by A. Beaty and illustrated by D. Roberts

- Book cover, illustrated by David Roberts
- Author: Andrea Beaty
- Audio read by: Bahni Turpin
- Illustrator: David Roberts
- Cover artist: David Roberts
- Language: English
- Series: The Questioneers
- Subject: Science
- Genre: Educational
- Publisher: Abrams Books for Young Readers
- Publication date: September 6, 2016
- Pages: 32
- ISBN: 978-1-4197-2137-3
- Preceded by: Rosie Revere, Engineer
- Followed by: Sofia Valdez, Future Prez

Ada Twist, Scientist is a 2016 children's picture book written by Andrea Beaty and illustrated by David Roberts. The story was well received and praised for encouraging children, especially girls, to develop an interest in STEM. The book also received a television series adaptation in 2021.

== Reception ==
Ada Twist, Scientist was popular with readers, debuting at #1 on The New York Times Best Seller list for Children's Picture Books, and it remained atop the list for four weeks. The book also reached #32 overall on the USA Today best-seller list.

The story also received critical acclaim from several outlets. School Library Journal gave the book a starred review. Booklist felt that it would encourage young readers to blaze trails in science, a thought echoed by Common Sense Media in its five star review. Kirkus Reviews called it a "cool and stylish" book that artfully illustrates Ada's curiosity, and Publishers Weekly highlighted Beaty and Roberts' encouragement that scientific research is "well worth the effort".

== Adaptation ==
Through their production company Higher Ground Productions, Barack and Michelle Obama entered production to create a television adaptation of Ada Twist, Scientist for Netflix, teaming up with Chris Nee. It was released on September 28, 2021. Further episodes were released on January 25, 2022. A third season was released on September 12, 2022. The series received a 2022 Annie Award for Best Animated Television/Broadcast Production for Preschool Children.
