= Chris Priestley =

British children's book author and illustrator

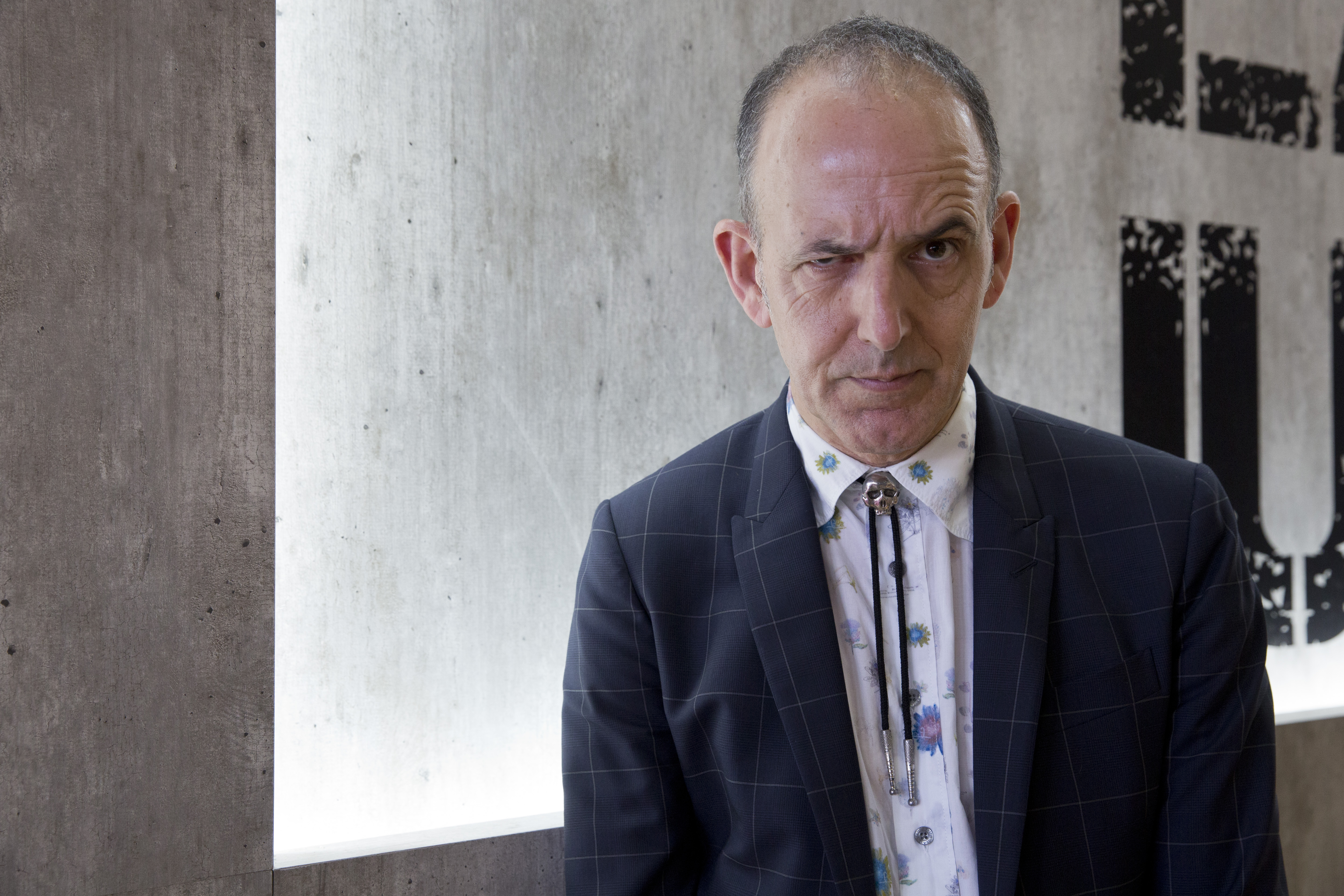
- Born: 1958 (age 67–68)
- Education: Manchester Metropolitan University
- Writing career
- Genres: Children's literature, horror

Chris Priestley (born 1957) is a British children's book author and illustrator. He lives in Cambridge, England.

== Biography and career ==
Chris Priestley grew up in Wales and Gibraltar, where as a nine-year-old, he won a medal in a local newspaper's story-writing competition. In 1976, after spending his teens in Newcastle-upon-Tyne, he left to study illustration at Manchester Polytechnic, leaving in 1980 to freelance in London.

He worked as an illustrator for a wide range of clients and his work appeared regularly in The Times, The Listener and The Observer. He also worked briefly as a poster designer for the Royal Court Theatre and others.

He has produced several strip cartoons - Bestiary for The Independent on Sunday (with Chris Riddell), Babel for The Observer, 7:30 for 8:0 for The Independent and Payne’s Grey for the New Statesman. From 1990 to 1996 he was a weekly cartoonist on The Economist, and from 1996 to 1998 a daily cartoonist on The Independent.

His paintings have been widely exhibited, most recently at the Eastern Open and the Royal Academy Summer Exhibition, both in 2013.

In 2000 he published his first children's book, Dog Magic.

In 2004, Death and the Arrow was shortlisted for an Edgar Award in the US, and in 2006, Redwulf's Curse won the Lancashire Fantastic Book Award.

Tales of Terror from the Black Ship won a CPNB Vlag and Wimpel in 2010 for the Dutch translation.

The German translation of Uncle Montague’s Tales of Terror was shortlisted for a Deutscher Jugendliteraturpreis in 2011.

Tales of Terror from the Tunnel's Mouth won the Dracula Society Children of the Night Award in 2009.

Mister Creecher won the BASH (Book Award St Helens) in 2012.

Priestley has also written for radio, contributing two stories to the BBC Radio 2 It's Grimm Up North collection of Brothers Grimm updates, transmitted on Christmas Eve 2012.

== Bibliography ==
- Freeze (2021)
- Seven Ghosts (2019)
- Maudlin Towers: Attack of the Meteor Monsters (2019)
- Maudlin Towers: Treasure of the Golden Skull (2018)
- Still Water (2018)
- Maudlin Towers: Curse of the Werewolf Boy (2017)
- Superpowerless (2017)
- Flesh and Blood (2017)
- The Last of the Spirits (2015)
- Anything That Isn't This (2015)
- The Dead Men Stood Together (2013)
- Through Dead Eyes (2013)
- Blood Oath (2011)
- The Dead Of Winter (2010)
- Mister Creecher (2010)
- New World (2007)
- Billy Wizard (2005)
- Battle of Hastings (2003)
- Witch Hunt (2003)
- Battle of Britain: My Story (2002)
- Jail-breaker Jack (2001)
- Dog Magic! (2000)

=== Tales of Terror ===
- Uncle Montague's Tales of Terror (2009)
- Tales of Terror from the Tunnel's Mouth (2009)
- Tales of Terror from the Black Ship (2010)
- The Teacher's Tales of Terror (2011)
- Christmas Tales of Terror (2012)

=== Tom Marlowe Adventures ===
- Death and the Arrow (2003)
- The White Rider (2004)
- Redwulf's Curse (2005)
