= Tom Baker =

English actor and writer (born 1934)

Tom Baker MBE
- Baker in 2012
- Born: 20 January 1934 (age 92); Liverpool, England
- Education: Rose Bruford College
- Occupations: Actor; writer
- Years active: 1956–present
- Spouses: Anna Wheatcroft (m. 1961; sep. 1966); Lalla Ward (m. 1980; div. 1982); Sue Jerrard (m. 1986)
- Children: 2
- Website: tombakerofficial.com

Signature
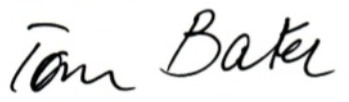

Thomas Stewart Baker (born 20 January 1934) is an English actor and writer. He is best known for playing the fourth incarnation of the Doctor in the BBC science fiction series Doctor Who from 1974 to 1981, making him the longest-serving actor in the role.

Raised devoutly Catholic in Liverpool, Baker trained to become a Christian brother before turning to acting. He joined the National Theatre company in 1968, and acted in productions of The Travails of Sancho Panza and The Merchant of Venice. His first major film role was as Grigori Rasputin in Nicholas and Alexandra (1971), for which he was nominated for two Golden Globes. Following supporting roles in genre films such as The Canterbury Tales (1972), The Vault of Horror (1973) and The Golden Voyage of Sinbad (1973), he was working part-time on a building site when he was cast as the lead in Doctor Who. Baker incorporated his own eccentric personality into the Doctor and became highly popular with audiences in the United Kingdom and abroad. His incarnation is often considered the best and most quintessential of the programme's classic series. (Note: Attributed to multiple sources) Baker has reprised the role in audio dramas since 2009, and made a cameo appearance in the series' 50th-anniversary special "The Day of the Doctor" (2013).

Baker appeared in the television series Medics (1992–1995), Randall & Hopkirk (Deceased) (2000–2001) and Monarch of the Glen (2004–2005). He moved into voice acting later in his career, providing narration for the comedy series Little Britain (2003–2006) and Little Britain USA (2008). In 2006, his "sonorous" voice was voted the fourth-most recognisable in the UK.

== Early life ==
Thomas Stewart Baker was born on 20 January 1934 at Liverpool Maternity Hospital. His mother, Mary Jane, was a barmaid and cleaner. His father, John Stewart Baker, (Note: In a 1971 interview, Baker stated that his father was Jewish.) was a steward in the Merchant Navy often absent from the household due to being away at sea. Baker was raised by his mother as a devout Roman Catholic. He had two younger siblings, Louisa and John.

Baker attended St Swithin's Primary School and was an altar boy in his youth. He then attended St Matthew's Catholic Secondary Modern School. Baker acted at school and was offered a job at the Abbey Theatre in Dublin, but his mother forbade him. He was impressed by a theatrical presentation from a Christian brother who came to talk at the school. Baker performed poorly on his exams and he sought a religious career as "a way out" of becoming a labourer.

At 15 years old, Baker left school to become a novice religious brother with the La Mennais Brothers in Jersey. He subsequently moved to Cheswardine Hall in Shropshire as a noviciate. Baker "ignored [his] symptoms of fading faith", stating in his 1997 autobiography: "I had had enough of religious life. So deep was my resentment of authority that I realised I had an intense desire to break all the Commandments." On the advice of a visiting priest, he resigned after six years of training. By 1974, Baker had lost his faith in God.

He undertook his national service in the Royal Army Medical Corps, serving for two years. Baker was initially in charge of the medical museum, but due to boredom, he secured a posting as a medical orderly at a British military hospital in Germany. He developed an interest in acting by taking part in the Medical Corps' amateur dramatics. Baker left the army in 1956 and took up acting, studying at the Rose Bruford College of Speech and Drama in Sidcup for three years.

== Career ==
=== 1966–1973: Early work ===
Baker was in his thirties when his professional acting career began. He worked in provincial repertory theatre, which he later recalled as "mostly flops or even disasters". His first acting role was in a 1966 production of The Winter's Tale at the Cambridge Theatre, the Edinburgh Festival and La Fenice in Venice, where he played multiple characters including Rogero, Autolycus and the bear. He made his film debut in a 1967 TV movie adaptation of the play, in the same roles. Baker had his first break whilst performing in a late-night pub revue for the 1968 York Festival. His performance was seen by a scout with the Royal National Theatre who encouraged him to audition for the company. Following a successful audition for Sir Laurence Olivier, Baker was given small parts and understudied. One of his bigger roles was the horse Rocinante in The Travails of Sancho Panza, directed by Joan Plowright. This led Olivier to cast Baker as the Prince of Morocco in The Merchant of Venice. Other productions included The National Health and A Woman Killed with Kindness.

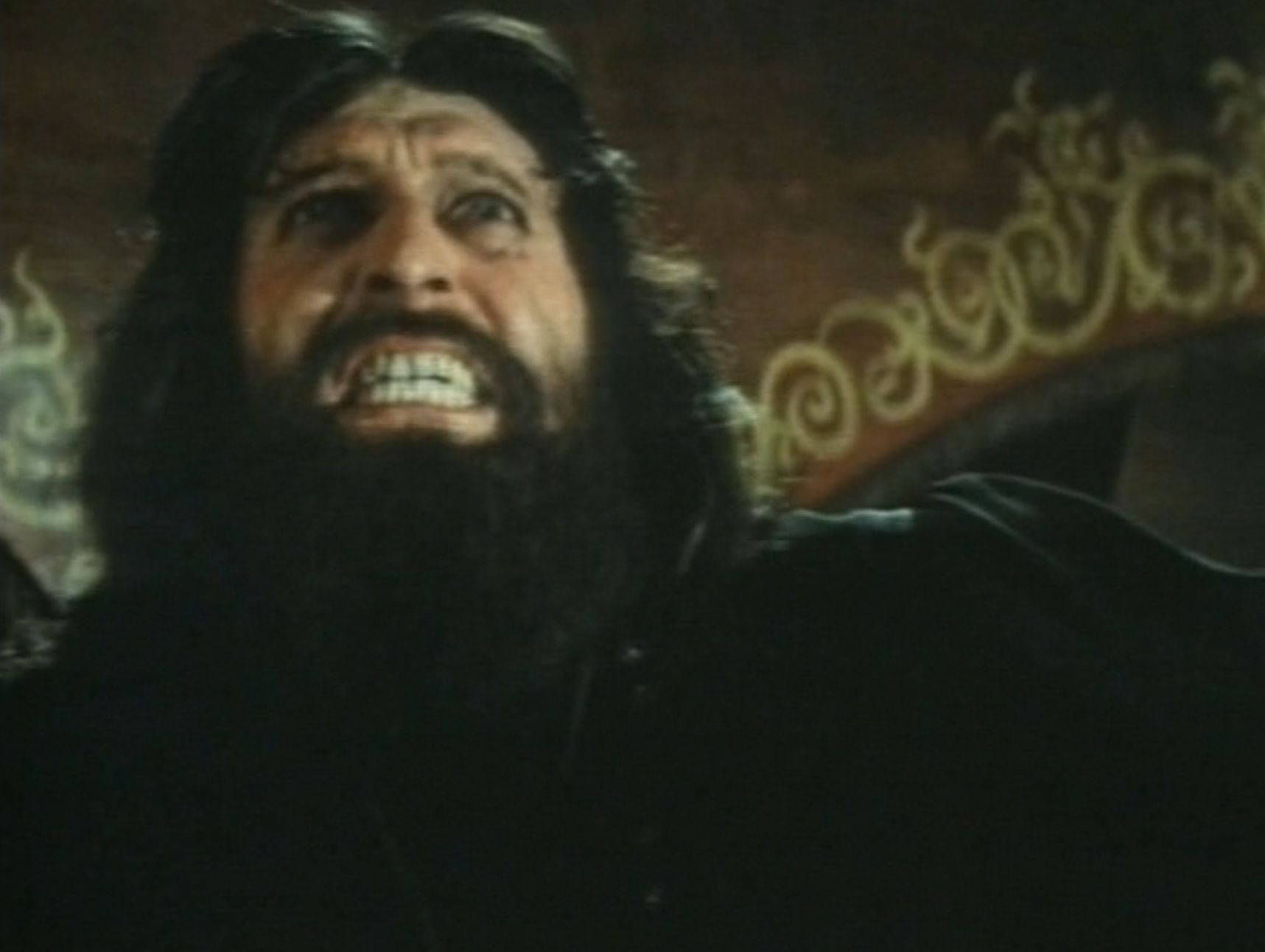
Baker's first major film role was Grigori Rasputin in Nicholas and Alexandra (1971).

His stage work led to work on television, where he gained small parts in series such as Dixon of Dock Green, Z-Cars, Market in Honey Lane and Softly, Softly. He played Dr Ahmed el Kabir in the BBC's 1972 Play of the Month production of The Millionairess, directed by Bill Slater and starring Maggie Smith. Baker's National Theatre contract ended in 1971. He continued to appear in theatre productions, with a role in The Novelist at Hampstead and as the lead in Macbeth at the Shaw Theatre, London. Due to Baker's role as a Russian in The Idiot, Olivier recommended him to producer Sam Spiegel for the part of Grigori Rasputin in Nicholas and Alexandra (1971), his first major film role. Baker was nominated for two Golden Globe Awards for his performance, one for Best Supporting Actor – Motion Picture and another for Most Promising Newcomer. He subsequently appeared in Pier Paolo Pasolini's 1972 film adaptation of The Canterbury Tales. In 1973, he played a tortured artist in The Vault of Horror and the villainous sorcerer Koura in Ray Harryhausen's The Golden Voyage of Sinbad.

=== 1974–1981: Doctor Who ===
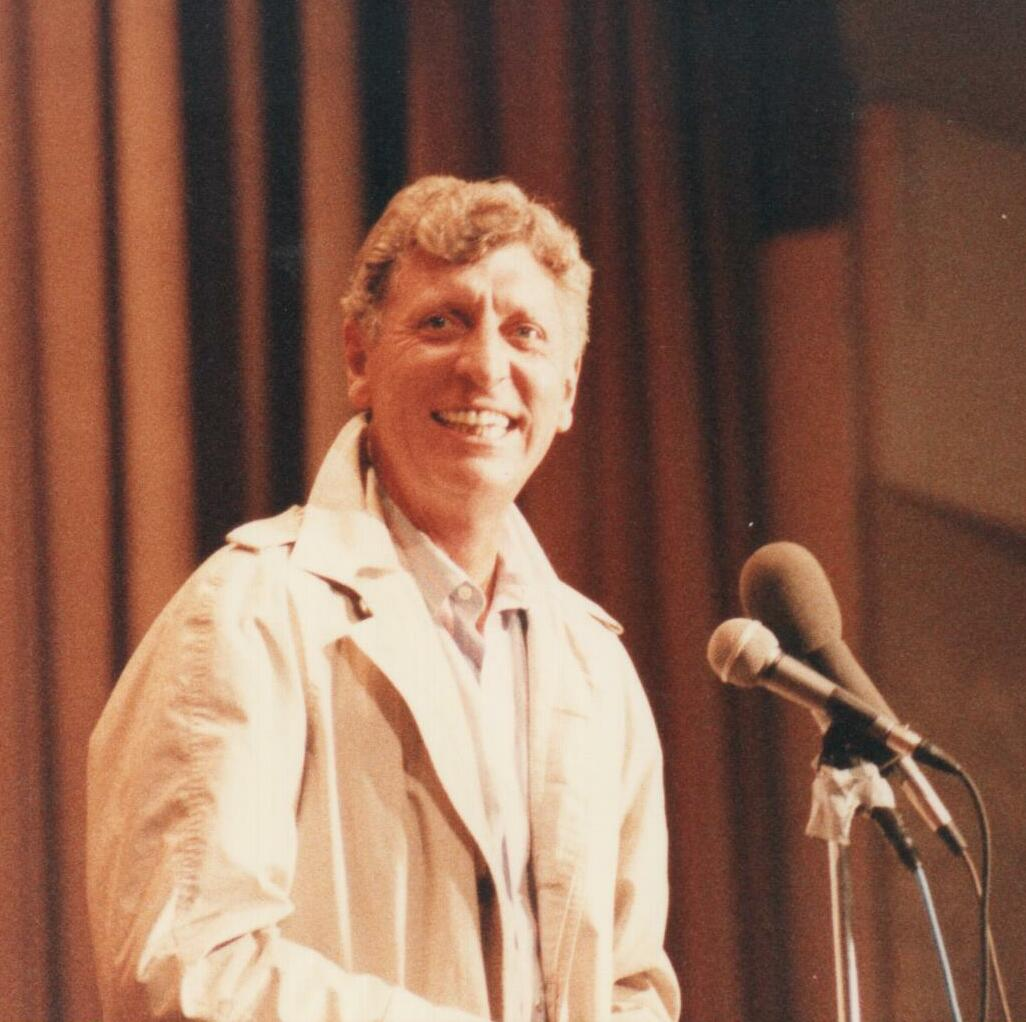
Baker at Whovent '86 in Washington, D.C.

Baker worked on a building site between acting jobs, which earned him the nickname "Sir Laurence" from his workmates. He had expected to appear in three films in 1974—Isabella of Spain, Three Men Went to War and Jackson's War—but all had collapsed by late 1973. Anxious at his career prospects, on 3 February 1974 he wrote to Bill Slater, the incoming BBC Head of Serials, asking for acting work. Slater recommended him to Doctor Who producer Barry Letts, who was seeking a successor to Third Doctor actor Jon Pertwee. Letts and script editor Terrance Dicks were impressed by Baker's performance in The Golden Voyage of Sinbad, and following a meeting with Baker in the BBC bar, the actor was quickly cast as the Fourth Doctor. Baker's casting was announced to the press on 15 February; he made his first appearance as the Doctor in the closing moments of Planet of the Spiders on 8 June. Baker's casting resulted in a wave of new acting offers. Even before recording his first season as the Doctor, he was cast in the television film The Author of Beltraffio (1974), directed by Tony Scott. The same year he played the title role in The Trials of Oscar Wilde at the Oxford Festival.

Although Baker had little idea of how he would play his version of the Doctor when cast, he quickly made the part his own, highlighting the character's eccentricity and alien qualities. Baker incorporated much of his own personality into the Doctor's (Note: "Baker had found an outlet for his own melodramatic eccentricities and the Doctor had discovered new alien depths. As Baker later admitted, the two were inseparable: 'I began to get into the part and then the part began to get into me... I was the Doctor and the Doctor was me... for more than six years I left myself and floated about as a hero.'" "...using his own natural eccentricity and wit to forge an unforgettable and truly iconic television hero..." "My Doctor Who was entirely Tom. It was just Tom. I wasn't acting. It just fell into my lap you know, and they said how are you going to do it? And I said I don't know. And I started saying the lines and the children loved it... I thought hey, so who wants to act? I can be Tom. They're loving Tom..." "I thought... this guy seems a little bit like Tom Baker, and so I played it like Tom Baker...") and frequently made comedic scripting suggestions and ad-libs. His trademark look of wearing a floppy hat and long multi-coloured scarf, as well as his deep voice, made him an immediately recognisable figure. Audience-viewing figures for his first few years returned to a level not seen since the height of "Dalekmania" a decade earlier. Baker relished his status as a children's hero, stating it was "better to be" the Doctor than to return to his "tangled" private life. He avoided smoking or swearing in public out of awareness that the Doctor was considered a role model for children.

"When I was doing Doctor Who, it was the realisation of all my childhood fantasies... so I took to it like a duck to water, and I still do. Doctor Who was more important than life to me - I used to dread the end of rehearsal... that's why I can't stay away from it."

— Baker in 2017

Under new producer Philip Hinchcliffe and script editor Robert Holmes, the series gained a gothic tone influenced by Hammer Horror films and was aimed at a more mature audience. Many of the stories from Baker's early seasons are considered classics, such as The Ark in Space (1975), Genesis of the Daleks (1975), The Brain of Morbius (1976), The Deadly Assassin (1976) and The Robots of Death (1977). Baker has named Hinchcliffe's tenure as his favourite period of the series, but the series' violent tone came under heavy criticism from conservative activist Mary Whitehouse. Hinchcliffe was replaced by Graham Williams, and the series' tone was lightened. Williams attempted to "rein in" Baker, but he was ultimately forced to accept the actor's growing influence over the programme.

Although production and promotion for Doctor Who dominated Baker's life, he made appearances in unrelated stage productions and television series during this period. In 1976, he appeared in productions of Hay Fever, Arden of Faversham, Boat in the Backyard and The Strongbox at the Stephen Joseph Theatre in Scarborough. He made appearances on the panel show Call My Bluff (1974) and the children's programme Multi-Coloured Swap Shop (1976). He read macabre short stories on the BBC2 series Late Night Story (1978–1979) and hosted the ITV children's literature series The Book Tower (1979–1981) for its first three series. Baker played Hasan, assistant to Howard Carter, in the ITV television film The Curse of King Tut's Tomb (1980).

Baker played the Doctor for seven consecutive seasons, making him the longest-serving actor in the part. His incarnation is often regarded as the most popular and quintessential of the Doctors. In polls conducted by Doctor Who Magazine, Baker was voted "Best Doctor" every year up to 2013, with the exception of losing to incumbents Sylvester McCoy in 1990 and David Tennant in 2006 and 2009. Baker's tenure corresponded with Doctor Who's first broadcasts in the United States, further cementing his popularity among international viewers. He also became proprietorial over the role of the Doctor and often berated writers and directors whose work he disliked. (Note: Attributed to multiple sources) In 1980, new producer John Nathan-Turner introduced noticeable changes to the series, including a new costume for Baker and a larger cast of companions. Baker found Nathan-Turner's approach to the series "unbearable" and decided it was time to depart the role. He said in 2014 that he may have stayed in the role for one season too long. Baker's departure was publicly announced on 24 October 1980. Logopolis (1981), the seventh and final serial of season 18, concluded with the Fourth Doctor's regeneration into the Fifth Doctor, played by Peter Davison.

==== Subsequent involvement ====
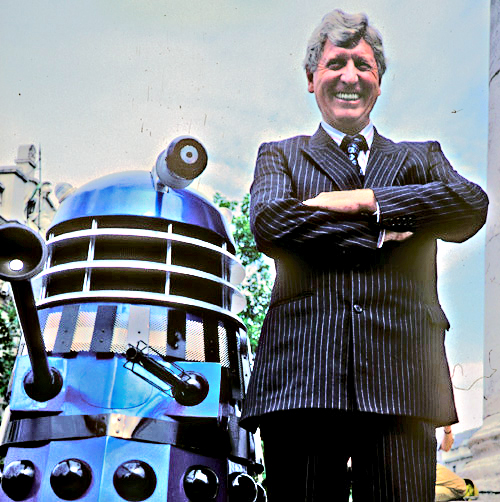
Baker and a Dalek in Trafalgar Square, 1991

Although his predecessors Patrick Troughton and Jon Pertwee reprised their roles for the 20th-anniversary episode "The Five Doctors" (1983), Baker declined as it was not long since he had left. He "didn't want to play 20 per cent of the part" or "fancy being a feed for other Doctors." A year later he stated "the programme is my past now - it would, I think, have been a mistake to try to turn the clock back". In 1992 Baker presented the video release The Tom Baker Years, where he looked back on the series by watching short clips from his episodes. Baker also filmed linking material for the 1992 video release of Shada, a serial which was only half-filmed due to a 1979 BBC strike.

In early 1992, Baker expressed willingness to return to the role of the Doctor. Development began on The Dark Dimension, a direct-to-video 30th anniversary special featuring Baker as an older version of the Fourth Doctor who had not regenerated. It was cancelled on 9 July 1993 due to budgetary and logistical issues. Baker returned to the role for the Children in Need charity special Dimensions in Time (1993), along with every surviving actor who played the Doctor. In 1997 he reprised the role in an advertising campaign for a New Zealand superannuation service, and for the Doctor Who video game Destiny of the Doctors. He also narrated various Target novelisations of Doctor Who stories for the BBC. (Note: Attributed to multiple sources)

Baker made a cameo appearance in the 50th-anniversary special "The Day of the Doctor" (2013) as a mysterious curator in the National Gallery, implied to be the Doctor's future incarnation. In 2017, the cast of Shada reunited to complete the unfilmed scenes via voice-over and animation, with Baker filming one live-action scene. Baker and James Goss co-wrote the 2019 novel Doctor Who: Scratchman, based on a script Baker and Ian Marter (who played companion Harry Sullivan) wrote for a proposed 1970s Doctor Who film.

==== Audio dramas ====
In 1976, Baker played the Doctor in two BBC audio dramas: Doctor Who and the Pescatons and the episode "The Time Machine" of Exploration Earth. All of Baker's successors (Davison, Colin Baker, McCoy and Paul McGann) reprised their roles in audio dramas by 2001, but Baker avoided doing so until BBC's Hornets' Nest in 2009. He subsequently appeared in two sequels, Demon Quest and Serpent Crest.

In March 2011, it was announced that Baker would return as the Fourth Doctor, alongside his companion Romana (Mary Tamm and Lalla Ward), for two series of audio dramas for Big Finish Productions. Big Finish also arranged for Baker to record a series with Elisabeth Sladen as Sarah Jane Smith, but Sladen died in April 2011 before any stories could be recorded. As of 2025, Big Finish has released 14 audio series starring Baker as the Doctor, featuring past co-stars such as Louise Jameson, Matthew Waterhouse and John Leeson. It was announced in March 2020 that Baker would record "Return of the Cybermen" for Big Finish, an alternative version of the serial Revenge of the Cybermen (1975); Sadie Miller, Sladen's daughter, voiced Sarah Jane Smith. In 2020, Baker returned to the role of the Curator in the Big Finish series The Eighth Doctor Adventures. Baker starred in the Big Finish drama The Curse of Time (2024) which commemorates 50 years of the Fourth Doctor.

=== 1982–2003: Return to character acting ===
Baker struggled with typecasting after leaving Doctor Who, withdrawing to the theatre. In 1981, he played Oscar Wilde for a second time on stage in Feasting with Panthers at the Chichester Festival Theatre. The same year he appeared in Treasure Island at the National.

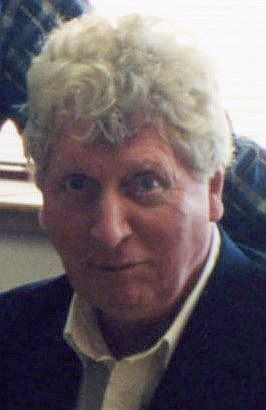
Baker in 2008

In 1982, he played Judge Brack in Hedda Gabler, with Susannah York as Hedda, in the West End. He portrayed Sherlock Holmes in a four-part BBC miniseries adaptation of The Hound of the Baskervilles, produced by Barry Letts. He then played Dr. Frank Bryant in a touring Royal Shakespeare Company production of Educating Rita. He returned to the National Theatre in 1984 to play Mr Hardcastle in She Stoops to Conquer in the Olivier Theatre and on tour. The following year he played both Sherlock Holmes and Moriarty in Hugh Leonard's The Mask of Moriarty at the Gate Theatre in Dublin. Baker appeared in Blackadder II (1986) as sea captain Redbeard Rum. In 1987, he played Inspector Goole in a production of An Inspector Calls at Westminster Theatre. Baker was also in high demand as a voice-over artist in radio and television advertising.

Baker's autobiography, Who on Earth is Tom Baker? was published in 1997. He also authored two children's books: Never Wear Your Wellies in the House and Other Poems to Make You Laugh (1981) and The Boy Who Kicked Pigs (1999). In 2000, he was the subject of an episode of the reality documentary series This Is Your Life.

By the early 1990s, Baker's now older appearance led to a reduction in typecasting; additionally he began to be cast by directors who grew up watching him on Doctor Who. He played Puddleglum in the BBC's 1990 television adaptation of The Silver Chair. He was cast as Professor Plum in the 1992 series of the game show Cluedo. He played the titular character in the 1992 radio comedy Lionel Nimrod's Inexplicable World. Baker narrated the 1990s BBC puppet series Tales of Aesop, based on Aesop's Fables. Baker's first long-running role since the Doctor was as Professor Hoyt in the hospital drama Medics (1992–1995). Baker reportedly turned down the role of Gandalf in the Lord of the Rings films, as he would not have accepted a role which would mean spending months away filming in New Zealand. In 2000, he appeared as Halvarth in the fantasy film Dungeons & Dragons. Baker played the ghostly Professor Wyvern in the series Randall & Hopkirk (Deceased) (2000–2001).

=== 2003–present: Little Britain and move into voice acting ===
Baker was cast as the narrator of the sketch comedy series Little Britain (2003–2006), a decision influenced by his role as Lionel Nimrod, as well as his popularity with series creators Matt Lucas and David Walliams, who belonged to the generation of children that admired his Doctor. Little Britain introduced Baker to a new generation of fans, and he credited the series with "re-inventing" his image. For the evening of 17 November 2005, to introduce the third television series of Little Britain, Baker read BBC One's continuity announcements in character. The same year, his "sonorous" voice was voted the fourth most recognisable in the UK, after Elizabeth II, Tony Blair and Margaret Thatcher. Baker returned to narrate the spin-off series Little Britain USA (2008) and video game adaptation Little Britain: The Video Game (2007). He later returned to narrate Little Britain's 2019 radio special.

Baker voiced the title character in the Channel 4 animated series Max Bear (2000). He voiced the villain ZeeBad in the animated film The Magic Roundabout (2005). The character was redubbed for the film's US release. Baker narrated Global Haywire, a 2006 political documentary by Australian cartoonist Bruce Petty. In 2007, he voiced Robert Baron in the BBC animated series The Secret Show. He narrated the children's animated series The Beeps (2007–2008). Baker voiced the Bendu, a powerful Force-sensitive being, in the animated series Star Wars Rebels (2016).

In January 2006, BT Group used Baker's voice for their text-to-speech service for landline phones. This required him to record 11,593 phrases, containing every sound in the English language. The service ended in April. The service returned from 1 December 2006 to 8 January 2007, with two pence from each text going to the charity Shelter. A charity cover of "You Really Got Me" by the Kinks, sung by Baker's automated voice, was released on 18 December.

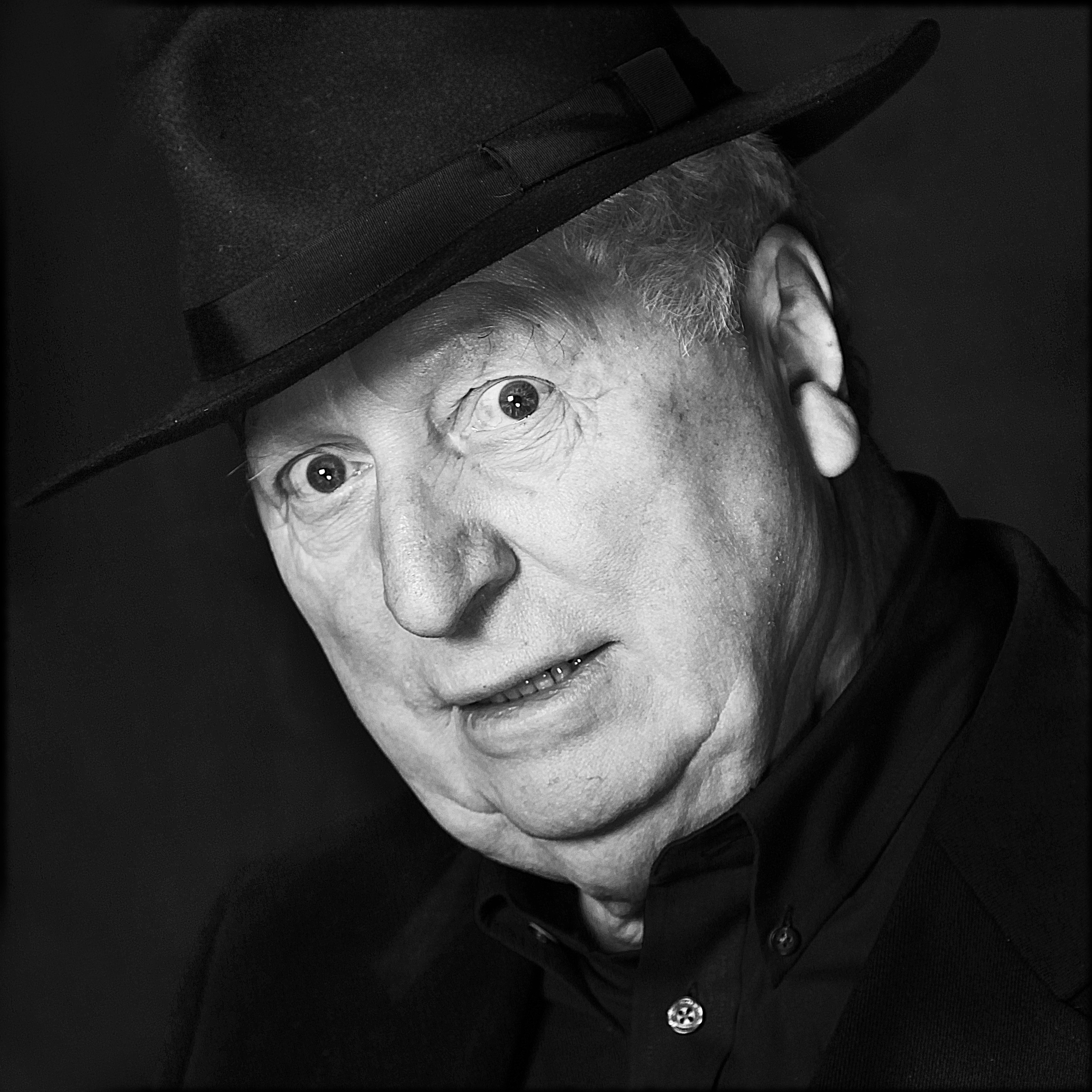
Baker in 2010

He continued to appear in television drama series. In 2003 he played a blind priest in the BBC series Strange. He was cast as eccentric patriarch Donald MacDonald in the sixth and seventh series of Monarch of the Glen. Baker also appeared on various game shows. He played the role of the Captain in Challenge's version of Fort Boyard. He also appeared as a guest on the quiz show Have I Got News for You and returned as a guest host in 2008. He was interviewed by his close friend Laurie Taylor for a 2010 episode of the television series In Confidence.

Baker portrayed barrister Sir Edward Marshall Hall in the BBC Radio 4 radio drama John Mortimer Presents: The Trials of Marshall Hall (1996). He played Sir Walter Bullivant in a 2001 BBC Radio 4 adaptation of The Thirty-Nine Steps. He guest starred in "The Saviour of Cripplegate Square", a 2002 episode of The Further Adventures of Sherlock Holmes. He appeared in a 2012 BBC Radio 4 radio adaptation of Charles Dickens' novel Hard Times.

Baker's voice has featured in the video games Ecco the Dolphin: Defender of the Future (2000), Hostile Waters: Antaeus Rising (2001), Warhammer 40,000: Fire Warrior (2003), Sudeki (2004), MediEvil: Resurrection (2005), Cold Winter (2005) and Nelly Cootalot: The Fowl Fleet (2016).

He has also provided vocals for musical artists. He appeared on the alternative rock band Mansun's 1998 album Six. He made a guest appearance on Stephen James' album Andabrek, released 2009. Baker provided spoken vocals for character of The Storyteller on Ayreon's 2020 concept album Transitus.

Baker in 2023

Baker will reprise the role of Sherlock Holmes in Sir Sherlock: The Red Letter Day, an audio drama from AUK Studios, with Doctor Who co-star John Leeson in the supporting role of Dr. Watson.

== Personal life ==
Baker was a member of the Colony Room Club, a private drinking club in Soho, where he became close friends with Francis Bacon, Jeffrey Bernard and Daniel Farson.

Baker has frequently scrutinised organised religion in the media. He described himself as "sort of Buddhist" in 2001 and "an atheist" in 2004. In a 2005 interview with Laurie Taylor for New Humanist, he restated that he was firmly non-religious and disavowed religion and notions of a God. He stated the same in 2010 in another interview with Taylor.

He was appointed a Member of the Order of the British Empire (MBE) in the 2025 New Year Honours for services to television. The investiture of his MBE took place at Hole Park in Kent on 10 November 2025 and was attended by his Doctor Who co-star Louise Jameson.

=== Family ===
Baker met Anna Wheatcroft (niece of wealthy rose grower Harry Wheatcroft) at Rose Bruford College; they married in 1961 and had two sons. Baker recounted in his autobiography that the treatment he received from Wheatcroft's family, after he was forced to care for his ill father-in-law, led to him attempting suicide. Baker and his wife separated in 1966. He lost contact with his sons until a chance meeting with one of them in 1997 in a New Zealand restaurant led to a reconciliation. In 2023, Baker said he was estranged from both of his sons.

In December 1980, he married Lalla Ward, who co-starred in Doctor Who as his character's companion Romana. They divorced after 16 months.

Baker married his third wife Sue Jerrard in 1986; they met when she was working as an assistant editor on the Doctor Who serial Horror of Fang Rock (1977). They lived in Boughton Malherbe in Kent, before moving to France in 2003. In November 2006, the couple left France and moved to Royal Tunbridge Wells, before later moving to East Sussex.

== Awards ==
Year	Association	Category	Work	Result	Ref.
1972	Golden Globes	Best Performance by an Actor in a Supporting Role in any Motion Picture	Nicholas and Alexandra	Nominated	
1972	Golden Globes	Most Promising Newcomer – Male	Nicholas and Alexandra	Nominated	
2016	Voice Arts Awards	Outstanding Spoken Word or Storytelling - Best Performance (shared with Brian Blessed, Brian Cox, Honeysuckle Weeks, Cathy Sara, John Rhys-Davies)	Beric the Briton	Won	
2021	Audie Awards	Audie Award for Audio Drama (shared with Matt Fitton, David K. Barnes, Lisa McMullin, John Dorney, Paul McGann, Nicola Walker, Hattie Morahan, Rebecca Root and Tom Price)	Doctor Who: Stranded (Series 1)	Won	

== Bibliography ==
- Never Wear Your Wellies in the House and Other Poems to Make You Laugh (1981)
- Who on Earth is Tom Baker?: An Autobiography (1997)
- The Boy Who Kicked Pigs (1999)
