= Alan MacDonald (writer) =

British writer

- Born: 1958 (age 67–68); Watford, Hertfordshire, England
- Occupation: Writer

Alan MacDonald (born in 1958 in Watford) is a children's writer living in Nottingham, England.

== Writing ==
MacDonald has worked in a team of writers on TV shows such as Tweenies, Horrid Henry and Fimbles.

He is also the author of a number of books including Triffic Chocolate and the popular Dirty Bertie series with illustrator David Roberts. Other works include The Sign of the Angel, Beware of the Bears and Pig in a Wig. He also wrote Gavin Peacock's biography, and many plays in his earlier career.

== Television ==
- Tweenies
- Fimbles
- Horrid Henry
- Old MacDonalds Farm
- The Shiny Show
- Numberjacks
- Sooty
- The Roly Mo Show
- Ni Ni's Treehouse
- A House That’s Just Like Yours
- Big Cook Little Cook
- Boo!
- Fun Song Factory
- BB3B
