= Philip Ardagh =

British children's writer

- Born: Shortlands, Kent, England
- Occupations: Writer, radio personality
- Writing career
- Genre: Children's literature
- Notable work: Eddie Dickens series

Philip Ardagh is an English children's author, primarily known for the Eddie Dickens series of books. He has written more than 100 books including adult fiction and children's non-fiction.

During 2004 and 2005 Ardagh collaborated with Sir Paul McCartney and illustrator-animator Geoff Dunbar to create McCartney's first children's book, High in the Clouds. The Observer called it "a tale about the perils of unchecked global capitalism".

== Grubtown Tales ==
In 2009, Ardagh published the first of his Grubtown Tales series, Stinking Rich & Just Plain Stinky, which won the Roald Dahl Funny Prize for being the funniest book that year. It was Ardagh's first major literary prize. Michael Rosen praised the books focus on the "disgusting and horrible" as something that children would love due to the constant pressure from adults to be clean. The series went on to contain seven full-length tales and a short story ("The Great Pasta Disaster") as a £1 promotional book for World Book Day in 2010. The series was illustrated by Jim Paillot.

== Eddie Dickens ==
Eddie Dickens is a recurring character in a series of six books, beginning with Awful End and ending with Final Curtain. 2020 sees the 20th anniversary of Eddie Dickens in print.

== Stick & Fetch Investigate ==
This series, introduced in 2018, for ages 5–8 features detective duo (and best friends) Sally Stick and her dog Fetch and is illustrated by Elissa Elwick.

== Philip Ardagh's Books & Things (Youtube) ==
Mr Ardagh's official YouTube channel is under the name of Philip Ardagh's Books & Things. He posted his first video on 18 March 2020 and has continued to post regularly. Mr Ardagh's videos range from beard maintenance to fun for kids. His channel was created during the COVID-19 pandemic with the aim of entertaining the nation. He has also uploads archive videos from the early 2000s.

== High in the Clouds ==
High in the Clouds is a book written by musician/songwriter Paul McCartney and Philip Ardagh and illustrated by Geoff Dunbar. The book was published in October 2005. The Independent called it "A rich, meandering, often funny tale."

== Books ==
Children's fiction

- Awful End (US: A House Called Awful End) [The Eddie Dickens Trilogy] (2000)
- Dreadful Acts [The Eddie Dickens Trilogy] (2001)
- Terrible Times [The Eddie Dickens Trilogy] (2002)
- Dubious Deeds [The Further Adventures of Eddie Dickens]
- Horrendous Habits [The Further Adventures of Eddie Dickens]
- Final Curtain [The Further Adventures of Eddie Dickens]
- The Fall of Fergal [Unlikely Exploits]
- Heir of Mystery [Unlikely Exploits]
- The Rise of the House of McNally [Unlikely Exploits]
- Stinking Rich and Just Plain Stinky [Grubtown Tales]
- The Far From Great Escape [Grubtown Tales]
- The Year That It Rained Cows [Grubtown Tales]
- Trick Eggs and Rubber Chickens [Grubtown Tales]
- The Great Pasta Disaster [Grubtown Tales]
- High in the Clouds (with Sir Paul McCartney & Geoff Dunbar)
- Barking Up the Wrong Tree [Stick & Fetch] (2018)
- The Wrong End of the Stick [Stick & Fetch] (2019)
- Off the Leash [Stick & Fetch] (2020)

Adult fiction

- The Not-So-Very-Nice Goings-On At Victoria Lodge, Without Illustrations by the Author
- The Silly Side of Sherlock Holmes, A Brand New Adventure Using A Bunch of Old Pictures

Non-fiction

- The Hieroglyphs Handbook, Teach Yourself Ancient Egyptian
- The Archaeologist's Handbook, An Insider's Guide to Digging Up The Past
- WOW! Ideas that Changed the World
- WOW! Events that Changed the World
- WOW! Inventions that Changed the World
- WOW! Discoveries that Changed the World
- The Truth About Christmas
- The Truth About Love
- The Truth About Fairies
- Why Are Castles Castle-Shaped?
- Did Dinosaurs Snore?
- The History Detectives series (with Colin King)
- The Get A Life series
- Philip Ardagh's Book Of Absolutely Useless Lists For Absolutely Every Day of The Year

== Awards ==
- Luchs (Lynx) Prize (Awarded by Die Zeit newspaper in Germany)
- Deutscher Jugendliteraturpreis (German youth literature prize)
- Roald Dahl Funny Prize 2009 (category 7-to-14 years)
