= Andrea Beaty =

American children's author

Andrea Beaty (/ˈbeɪdi/) is an American children's author.

Beaty was born in Benton, Illinois and currently resides in Naperville, Illinois. As a child, she loved Nancy Drew mysteries. She attended Southern Illinois University and studied Biology and Computer Science. After graduating, she worked for a software company, doing some technical writing. Her tech writing experience led her to write children's books. She received the Prairie State for Excellence in Children's Writing Award from the Illinois Reading Council in 2014.

== Awards and honors ==
Seven of Beaty's books are Junior Library Guild selections: Doctor Ted (2008), Rosie Revere and the Raucous Riveters (2019), Iggy Peck and the Mysterious Mansion (2020, print and audiobook), Sofia Valdez and the Vanishing Vote (2020), Ada Twist and the Perilous Pants (2019, print and audiobook), Ada Twist and the Disappearing Dogs (2022), and Aaron Slater and the Sneaky Snake (2023).

The American Library Association has included several of Beaty's books on their book lists, including Rise: A Feminist Book Project (Rosie Revere, Engineer, 2014; Sofia Valdez, Future Prez, 2021) and the Association for Library Service to Children's list of Notable Children's Books (Ada Twist, Scientist, 2017).

Rosie Revere, Engineer (2013), Ada Twist, Scientist (2016), Sofia Valdez, Future Prez (2019) and Aaron Slater, Illustrator (2021) have been New York Times best selling children's picture books.

In 2018, Booklist included the audiobook edition of Rosie Revere and the Raucous Riveters, read by Rachel L. Jacobs, on their list of Audio Stars for Youth.

== Publications ==
- When Giants Come to Play. Illustrated by Kevin Hawkes. New York: Abrams Books for Young Readers. 2006. ISBN 978-0-8109-5759-6.
- Iggy Peck, Architect. Illustrated by David Roberts. New York: Abrams Books for Young Readers. 2007. ISBN 978-0-8109-1106-2.
- Cicada Summer. New York: Amulet Books. 2008. ISBN 978-0-8109-9472-0. OCLC 155715147.
- Dr. Ted. Illustrated by Pascal Lemaître. New York: Atheneum Books for Young Readers. 2008. ISBN 978-1-4169-2820-1.
- Firefighter Ted. Illustrated by Pascal Lemaitre. New York: Margaret K. McElderry Books. 2009. ISBN 978-1-4169-2821-8.
- Hush, Baby Ghostling. Illustrated by Pascal Lemaître. New York: Margaret K. McElderry Books. 2009. ISBN 978-1-4169-2545-3.
- Attack of the Fluffy Bunnies. Illustrated by Dan Santat. New York: Amulet Books. 2010. ISBN 978-0-8109-8416-5.
- Hide and sheep. Illustrated by Bill Mayer. New York: Margaret K. McElderry Books. 2011. ISBN 978-1-4169-2544-6.
- Artist Ted. Illustrated by Pascal Lemaître. New York: Margaret K. McElderry Books. 2012. ISBN 978-1-4169-5374-6.
- Dorko the Magnificent. New York: Amulet Books. 2013. ISBN 978-1-4197-0638-7.
- Rosie Revere, Engineer. Illustrated by David Roberts. New York: Abrams Books for Young Readers. 2013. ISBN 978-1-4197-0845-9.
- Happy Birthday Madame Chapeau. Illustrated by David Roberts. New York: Abrams Books for Young Readers. 2014. ISBN 978-1-4197-1219-7. OCLC 870199831.
- Fluffy Bunnies 2: The Schnoz of Doom. Illustrated by Dan Santat. New York: Amulet Books. 2015. ISBN 978-1-4197-1051-3.
- Ada Twist, Scientist. Illustrated by David Roberts. New York: Abrams Books for Young Readers. 2016. ISBN 978-1-4197-2137-3.
- Rosie Revere's Big Project Book for Bold Engineers. Illustrated by David Roberts. New York: Abrams Books for Young Readers. 2017. ISBN 978-1-4197-1910-3.
- Rosie Revere and the Raucous Riveters. Illustrated by David Roberts. New York: Amulet Books. 2018. ISBN 978-1-4197-3360-4.
- Ada Twist and the Perilous Pantaloons. Harry N. Abrams. 2019. ISBN 978-1-419-73901-9.
- Sofia Valdez, Future Prez. Illustrated by David Roberts. New York: Abrams Books for Young Readers. 2019. ISBN 978-1-4197-3704-6.
- Iggy Peck and the Mysterious Mansion. Illustrated by David Roberts. New York: Amulet Books. 2020. ISBN 978-1-4197-3692-6.
- One Girl. Illustrated by Dow Phumiruk. New York: Abrams Books for Young Readers. 2020. ISBN 978-1-4197-1905-9. OCLC 1142012371.
- Sofia Valdez and the Vanishing Vote. Illustrated by David Roberts. New York: Amulet Books. 2020. ISBN 978-1-4197-4350-4.
- Aaron Slater, illustrator. The Questioneers. Illustrated by David Roberts. New York: Abrams Books for Young Readers. 2021. ISBN 978-1-4197-5396-1.
- Aaron Slater's Big Project Book for Astonishing Artists. Illustrated by David Roberts. New York: Abrams Books for Young Readers. 2022. ISBN 978-1-4197-5397-8.
- Ada Twist and the Disappearing Dogs. Illustrated by David Roberts. New York: Amulet Books. 2022. ISBN 978-1-4197-4352-8.
- I Love You Like Yellow. Illustrated by Vashti Harrison. New York: Abrams Books for Young Readers. 2022. ISBN 978-1-4197-4807-3.
- Aaron Slater and the Sneaky Snake. Illustrated by David Roberts. New York: Amulet Books. 2023. ISBN 978-1-64700-272-5.
- Bug Bonanza!. Co-written by Theanne Griffith. New York: Amulet Books. 2023. ISBN 978-1-4197-6555-1. OCLC 1352493898.
- Lila Greer, Teacher of the Year. Illustrated by David Roberts. New York: Abrams Books for Young Readers. 2023. ISBN 979-8-88707-074-2.
