= Geoff Dunbar =

English animator

Geoff Dunbar is an English animator and director known for his animated music video Rupert Bear and the Frog Song for Sir Paul McCartney and The World of Peter Rabbit and Friends from the stories by Beatrix Potter. He championed a hand-sketch style of animation.

== Career ==
He left school at 15 and joined Larkins Studio when he was 18/19. where he learnt animation. He later joined Halas and Batchelor's animation company where he started directing. In 1973 he joined Dragon Productions with Oscar Grillo, who with the Arts Council of Great Britain co-financed Lautrec. He later formed his own company, Grand Slamm Animation, where he produced Ubu. Lautrec won the Palme d'Or at the Cannes Film Festival in 1975 and Ubu won the Golden Bear award for Best Short Film at the 1979 Berlin International Film Festival.

== Works ==
He went on to produce three animations with the soundtrack by Sir Paul McCartney. He produced three episodes for the BBC of The World of Peter Rabbit and Friends.

Using his 'sketched' style of animation he produced Daumier's Law based on the work of the 19th century French artist Honoré Daumier. It won a BAFTA in 1993 for best short animation.

In collaboration with Sir Paul McCartney he adapted the Caldecott Prize-winning children's novel Tuesday by David Wiesner using computer animation. The film received a BAFTA nomination, Short Animation category, in 2002.

His current company is High Eagle Productions.

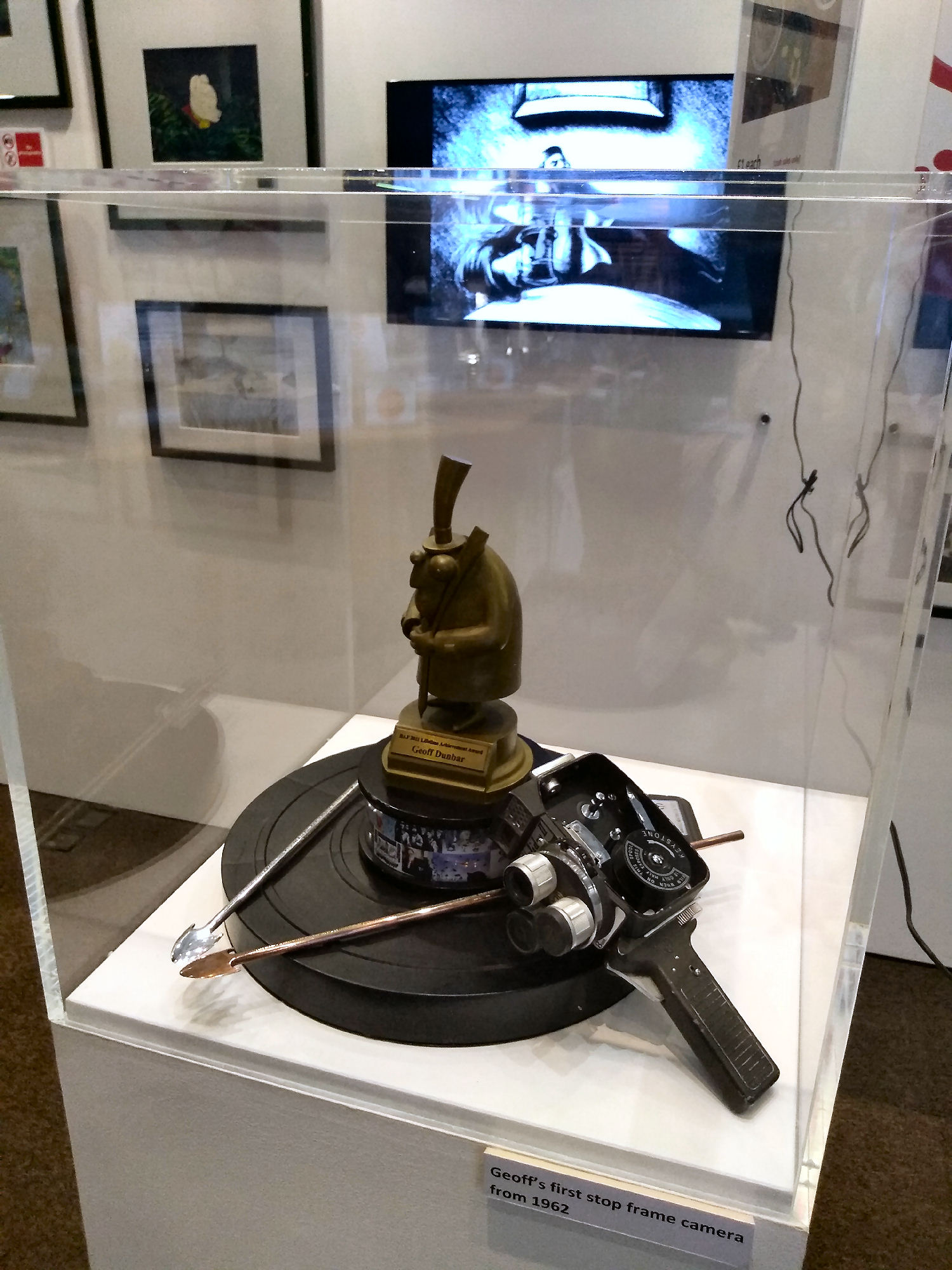
Geoff Dunbar's first stop frame camera (1962)

In 2019 the Barbican Music Library held an exhibition of his work: Geoff Dunbar: Art into Animation.

== Filmography ==
Title	Year	Note
This Love Thing	1970	
The Condition of Man	1971	
Lautrec	1974	Short. Music by Laurie Scott Baker
Ubu	1978	Short. Music by Laurie Scott Baker
Rupert and the Frog Song	1984	Short. Music by Paul McCartney
The World of Peter Rabbit and Friends		BBC TV
-The Tale of Peter Rabbit and Benjamin Bunny	1992	
-The Tale of Mrs. Tiggy-Winkle and Mr. Jeremy Fisher	1994	
-The Tale of Mr. Tod	1998	
Daumier's Law	1992	Short. Music by Paul McCartney
Tropic Island Hum	1997	Short, Music by Paul McCartney
Tuesday	2001	Short. Music by Paul McCartney
The Cunning Little Vixen	2003	TV movie
