= Dragon Hunters (film) =

2008 French film by Guillaume Ivernel & Arthur Qwak

- French theatrical release film poster
- Directed by: Guillaume Ivernel; Arthur Qwak
- Written by: Frédéric Engel-Lenoir; Arthur Qwak
- Based on: Dragon Hunters by Arthur Qwak
- Produced by: Philippe Delarue; Tilo Seiffert
- Starring: French version: Vincent Lindon; Patrick Timsit; Marie Drion; English version: Forest Whitaker; Rob Paulsen; Mary Mouser
- Cinematography: Arthur Qwak
- Edited by: Soline Guyonneau
- Music by: Klaus Badelt
- Production companies: Futurikon; LuxAnimation; Trixter; Mac Guff Ligne
- Distributed by: Futurikon; BAC Films (France); Universum Film; Buena Vista International (Germany)
- Release dates: 20 March 2008 (Russia and New Zealand); 26 March 2008 (France); 5 April 2008 (United States); 24 April 2008 (Germany)
- Running time: 82 minutes
- Countries: France; Luxembourg; Germany
- Language: English
- Budget: €12 million
- Box office: $12.3 million

Dragon Hunters (French: Chasseurs de dragons) is a 2008 animated fantasy film telling the adventures of two dragon hunters, written by Frédéric Engel-Lenoir, directed by creator Arthur Qwak and Guillaume Ivernel with music by Klaus Badelt and produced by Philippe Delarue and Tilo Seiffert. It features the voices of Vincent Lindon, Patrick Timsit, Marie Drion in the French version and Forest Whitaker, Rob Paulsen and Mary Mouser in the English version. The film was produced by Futurikon, and co-produced by LuxAnimation, Mac Guff Ligne and Trixter. It shares the same creative universe as the Dragon Hunters TV series. It was released on March 26, 2008, in France and on March 20, 2008, in Russia and New Zealand. It was also distributed by Icon Productions and Bac Films. The film received a Cristal Award nomination for Best Feature and it earned $12,235,843 on a €12,000,000 budget. Dragon Hunters was released on DVD on April 5, 2008, in the United States by Peace Arch Entertainment, and on November 5, 2008, in France by Warner Home Video.

== Plot ==
The world has become a vast arrangement of floating islands of varying sizes and shapes. This dizzy universe is populated with rogues, peasants, and petty lords. Their main concerns are for survival, for this world has become plagued with hungry creatures, who are wreaking havoc, known as dragons.

Lian-Chu and Gwizdo are two struggling dragon hunters who have yet to achieve a real success. Lian Chu is a physically imposing warrior with a gentle nature, while Gwizdo is an anxious, opportunistic negotiator prone to swindling clients. Their shared dream is to earn enough money to buy a farm and raise a sheep.

A few floating islands away, there is a fortress owned by Lord Arnold. The lord has a problem. He has been living in fear of the return of the World Gobbler, a monstrous dragon that rises every twenty seasons to spread terror and destruction. Nobody has been able to conquer him. And nobody has ever returned alive or sane enough to tell the tale. Lord Arnold's niece Zoe has decided to take matters into her own hands, and she finds Lian-Chu and Gwizdo to help her. She is convinced that they are the heroes of her dreams, and she goes with them to the end of the earth for a fantastic and dangerous adventure.

== Cast ==
Character	French voice actor	Hungarian voice actor	English voice actor
Lian-Chu	Vincent Lindon	István Hajdu (Steve)	Forest Whitaker
Gwizdo	Patrick Timsit	László Görög	Rob Paulsen
Zoé	Marie Drion	Lilla Hermann	Mary Mouser
Lord Arnold	Philippe Nahon	Gábor Reviczky	Nick Jameson
Gildas	Amanda Lear	László Tahi Tóth	Jess Harnell
Hector	Jérémy Prévost		Dave Wittenberg
Fat John	Jean-Marc Lentretien		John DiMaggio

== Production ==
On 14 October 2007, it was announced that Arthur Qwak and Guillaume Ivernel were hired and set to direct Dragon Hunters based on the TV series of the same name by Arthur Qwak. Frédéric Engel-Lenoir and Qwak wrote the script for the film. Philippe Delarue and Tilo Seiffert produced the film with the budget of €12,000,000 for release in 2008. On 19 October, it was announced that Rob Paulsen, Forest Whitaker, Mary Mouser, Nick Jameson, Jess Harnell and Dave Wittenberg from the English dubbed version joined the film. On 10 December 2007, it was announced that Klaus Badelt would compose the music for the film. Development and storyboarding of the film was completed in Paris, France. Production then moved to Berlin, Germany and Luxembourg City, Luxembourg for the final phases of animation, lighting, color and production in order to maximize tax credits offered to foreign film projects in Germany and Luxembourg. On 12 December, Futurikon, BAC Films, Icon Productions and Universum Film (UFA) acquired distribution rights to the film. Dragon Hunters was filmed at France, Germany and Luxembourg in January 2008. Jalan Jalan's single, "Lotus", from his 1999 album Bali, was featured in the film.

== Release ==
An English dubbed version starring the voices of Forest Whitaker, Rob Paulsen and Mary Mouser was released in the United States on 5 April 2008.

=== Home media ===
Dragon Hunters was released on DVD on November 5, 2008, in France by Warner Home Video. About 1 Million DVDs (French and English version) were sold in the US.

== Reception ==
=== Box office ===
Dragon Hunters grossed €34,068 in France for a worldwide total of $12,235,843. In Brazil, the film opened to number four in its first weekend, behind Horton Hears a Who!, Doomsday and Never Back Down. In its second weekend, the film moved up to number three. In its third weekend, the film dropped to number four. In its fourth weekend, the film dropped to number five, grossing $61,167.

=== Critical reception ===
The review aggregation website Rotten Tomatoes surveyed 9 reviews and found 67% of them to be positive, with an average rating of 5.8/10.

=== Awards ===
Award	Category	Nominee	Result
Cristal	Best Feature	Guillaume Ivernel and Arthur Qwak	Nominated

== Soundtrack ==
Dragon Hunters: Original Motion Picture Soundtrack

Soundtrack album / Film score by Klaus Badelt
- Released: April 5, 2008
- Recorded: 2008
- Genres: Movie Soundtrack, Film Score
- Length: 62:40
- Label: Skylark Sound Studios
- Producer: Klaus Badelt

Klaus Badelt film scores chronology
Anything for Her (2008)	Dragon Hunters: Original Motion Picture Soundtrack (2008)	Little Nicholas (2008)

Dragon Hunters: Original Motion Picture Soundtrack is the film's soundtrack album and film score made by Klaus Badelt and released on April 5, 2008, by Skylark Sound Studios. Klaus Badelt scored the music for the film and on its soundtrack. The soundtrack also contains "Lotus" performed by Jalan Jalan.

Songs and music

- Lotus - Performed by Jalan Jalan
- All Music - Composed by Klaus Badelt

== See also ==
- Dragon Hunters
