= Minuscule (TV series) =

- Created by: Hélène Giraud; Thomas Szabo
- Directed by: Hélène Giraud; Thomas Szabo
- Country of origin: France
- Original language: English

Production
- Producer: Philippe Delarue
- Running time: 6 minutes
- Production company: Futurikon

Original release
- Network: France 2 France 5
- Release: October 25, 2006 – 2012

Minuscule is a French live action and CGI TV series, produced by Futurikon and created by Hélène Giraud and Thomas Szabo. The TV series comes in the form of short segments – focusing mostly on a variety of insects – where their mundane, everyday lives take on a humorous turn. Superimposing stylized characters over real-life scenery (of rural France), the main characters' comical scenarios come in the form of silent comedy. Aside from the main characters, animals and humans may also show up in minor roles, but the show does not utilize any proper spoken dialogue.

The series had been compared to popular media by the staff themselves. These include the film Microcosmos, nature-related documentaries from National Geographic, as well as cartoons by Tex Avery and cartoons produced for the Warner Brothers.

== Plot ==
Minuscule has a few short segments per episode, all of which have its own self-contained story. The series also has a variety of specific and well-known insect species (all without proper names, except for the film adaptations), as well as a gastropod, for the main cast. These stories may focus on some of the following characters:

- Ladybugs
- Black ants
- Red ants
- A jumping spider
- A yellow, buck-toothed red spider (although not a red spider mite)
- Slender, green caterpillars
- Chubby, blue caterpillars
- A mosquito
- Honey bees
- Wasps
- Dragonflies
- Flies
- Dung beetles
- Butterflies
- A brown moth
- A grasshopper
- Snails
- A black millipede (mistakenly called a centipede)
- Cicada
- An orange bumblebee

Mammals may also occasionally show up, depending on the episode's setting (like a herd of cows on grassland), but seemingly do not care about the insects' shenanigans. While humans were considered as irrelevant characters in the first season, the second season feature the insects explicitly interacting with them (unintentional or not) more.

== Production and distribution ==
Minuscule is produced by Phillipe Delarue, Thomas Szabo and Hélène Giraud at French studio Futurikon. The show's generalized country settings and avoidance of spoken dialogue enable universal accessibility and appeal. The series has been sold to more than 100 countries on television and about 30 countries on video.

=== Other media ===
The "region 4" DVD set for the first season consists of 3 discs. There were also very few merchandise made for the series, featuring its main characters, like a calendar, bookmarks and printable activities.

A feature film based on the series, with the same creative team, titled Minuscule: Valley of the Lost Ants, was released on January 29, 2014. A second feature film, Minuscule 2: Mandibles from Far Away, was released on January 30, 2019.
