= Kaput & Zösky =

- Also known as: Kaput & Zösky: The Ultimate Obliterators
- Genre: Science fiction Comedy
- Created by: Lewis Trondheim
- Written by: Eric Rondeaux; Lewis Trondheim
- Directed by: Didier Loubat
- Starring: Rick Jones; Mark Camacho; John Stocker; Helen King; Sonja Ball; Tony Rosato; Stacey DePass
- Composers: Philippe Vidor; Lionel Dublanchet
- Countries of origin: Canada; France
- Original languages: English; French
- No. of seasons: 2
- No. of episodes: 26 (78 Segments)

Production
- Executive producers: Philippe Delarue; Paul Cadieux
- Editor: Jean-Michel Laprise
- Running time: 30 minutes
- Production companies: Futurikon; Tooncan Productions, Inc.

Original release
- Network: France 3 (France); Teletoon (Canada)
- Release: September 2, 2002 – December 15, 2003

Related
- Fly Tales

Kaput & Zösky: The Ultimate Obliterators is an animated television series based on the comic book series from the cartoonist Lewis Trondheim called Kaput et Zösky. In total, 26 half-hour episodes (78 shorts) were produced.

Some of the stories featured in the comics were converted into the series.

== Premise ==
Bloodthirsty conquerors Kaput and Zösky travel the universe, landing on planets and trying to conquer them. They are not the most able tyrants, however, and have trouble holding any planet for more than a few days, if they can even manage to dominate it in the first place. In fact, they spend as much time running for their lives as they do enslaving and slaughtering innocents. Kaput and Zösky are a dynamic, if generic, duo. Zösky is a cunning, level-headed pseudo-intellectual who always has a plan. Kaput, on the other hand, is short-tempered and volatile; his strategies always involve "crisperizing" everything in sight. Kaput is a short and dumpy little terrorizer with a brilliant red mohawk, and Zösky is a tall and thin tyrant with a set of yellow antennae. Their exploits almost always end in the same way for the two space tyrants; the two barely escape from their fates by flying off in their dumpy little spaceship, leaving a red smoke trail behind.

== Characters ==
Kaput (voiced by Rick Jones) – Kaput is the short and fat one of the duo, and the exact reverse of Zösky. While Zösky is clean, methodical, and thorough, Kaput is all mayhem and prefers to fire at will. He has red hair in the shape of an unruly mohawk and a prominent underbite. His crisperizer is red as are the buttons on his outfit, and he has short boots. Kaput is considered an object of derision to most, due to his fat body and his manner. He is also allergic to moles and swells up when he is near them.

Zösky (voiced by Mark Camacho) – Zösky is the thin one of the duo, and more of the planner. He seems to be well-versed on matters beyond Kaput's control, and is quite easily agitated by Kaput's mayhem and discord. His home planet is Lamamma, He also wishes to first use his mind to dominate rather than brute force. Zösky is tall and thin, has yellow antennae which resemble bunny ears, and squinted eyes. His crisperizer and the buttons on his shirt are yellow, and sports tall boots. To some characters in the show, Zösky is considered attractive, perhaps due to his British accent and his suavé manners. Zösky can't stand carrots, contrary to some characters believing that he is a rabbit and thus likes them.

=== Minor characters ===
Crazy Joe – A crazed, dirty mercenary, Crazy Joe is after Kaput and Zösky to try to "cream them". It was never revealed what he had against them, but it possibly has to do with Kaput borrowing a massive amount of money off of Crazy Joe. He was brainwashed so that he would be little more than a lackey to them, but soon came to his senses and resumed his pursuit of the two. He is shown being short and having the same build as Kaput as well as being tan and having tentacles at the bottom of his body. His ship resembles Kaput and Zösky's ship. Some events had occurred in the show where the deranged villain was forced to join forces with Kaput and Zösky, such as the instance where the three were sent to a mental asylum.

Office Lady (voiced by Helen King) – The Office Lady helps the two on their assumption of power on the office planet. She is a character who is dressed in a suit and wears an air helmet. She translates all of the employee complaints to Kaput and Zösky. Towards the end of her appearances, she advises the two to leave before lawyers came to "instigate proceedings on work-equipment deterioration and attempted intimidation".

The Great Ghandizen (voiced by John Stocker) – The Great Ghandizen is a squat, little ruler with an arsenal of crushing devices with which to crush offenders. He made a massive amount of contributions to his planet and is long-lived, being about 600 years old.

Marvin the Enchanter (voiced by John Stocker) – Marvin is a birdlike, bespectacled wizard with a white beard famed for his ability to perform magic of an awesome ability. He assists Kaput in trying to take the crown of the planet by magically attaching the sword Exkaliput, a clear parody of Excalibur to his hand. Marvin is also a play on Merlin of King Arthur lore.

Bobo Bibola (voiced by John Stocker) – Bobo Bibola is a genie who is the denizen of a lamp which very seldom opens. He is against granting Kaput and Zösky wishes because he is tired of doing favors when he gets nothing in return.

Ghost King – The Ghost King is not exactly dead, nor alive, but he is invisible and considered a ghost. He takes control of inanimate objects because he lacks a body. He is also furious at Kaput and Zösky for ruining his kingdom.

El Kinga – The current ruler of Diskotekus and a dancer, who is a large two-headed ruler, one head sports a pompadour and the other, blonde hair. This ruler is not only the leader of his/her planet, but also the most revered dancer.

Ichabob the Liberator – A native to a planet held in discord for many years, Ichabob is commonly known as Ichabob the Liberator. He has a long, unkempt beard and tattered clothes from staying underground for so many years. He was unwittingly freed from prison by Kaput and Zösky when he pretended to be a crazed prisoner. He speaks in a strong Scottish accent.

Max – Like many of the other characters, Max made only one appearance in the show. He is a cheery and helpful mechanic who installs a travelling device in the ship belonging to Kaput and Zösky. He wears traditional mechanic garb and speaks with a New York accent. With his moderation, the two conquerors made it to uncharted lands far away from the rest of the galaxy.

Mermaid Queen – The Mermaid Queen is a large, corpulent sea creature who is the queen of the planet H2O. She was shown as the bride to Kaput when he was forced to marry the queen in order to gain the crown. She speaks in a strong New York accent in the voice of a man. When angered, she emits a large, blinding cloud of ink, like an octopus.

Boudini – Boudini is a wizard of the planet Hokus Pokus. He is the ruler and an accomplished magician. He wears a pointed black outfit as well as a magic scepter with which to perform magic of all varieties. Boudini had plans for Zösky, in the hopes of disappearing him, for he thought that Zösky was a rabbit. Kaput rescued Zösky by dressing like a woman, who had caught Boudini's eye, because there were no more women on Hokus Pokus. Boudini was converted into a large, savage beast when Kaput stole his scepter and has apparently remained that way since.

"Cabbie" – The cabbie is a sluglike character who speaks with a strong New York accent and drives the two conquerors around on Rycta Ryctim, while bearing in mind the planet's cardinal rule; obey the traffic signs. He refers to Kaput and Zösky as "touristás".

Heads and Tails – These two (they are two different personalities with one body) are the instruction manual of the planet Gamma Blorg, and are conjoined twins. One speaks in a strong English accent and has a tiara as well as red hair, is named Heads, and the other, Tails is a moose head with a Canadian accent. They argue continuously and have a cauldron as a body.

== Broadcast ==
Kaput and Zösky: The Ultimate Obliterators had made its debut sometime on September 3, 2002, though when it is not revealed exactly, but for a short time, this show had made a niche in Teletoon and Nicktoons Network, running on weekends and late at night on them. While it was shown on Nicktoons, most of the episodes that were made were exempted from airing until sometime in January 2007, when "new episodes" had made their way onto the network. It also aired in Australia on ABC 2 and the United Kingdom on Channel 4.

== Home media ==
There were four Kaput & Zösky DVDs released in 2005 by Filmoption International and Direct Source Special Product Inc. The DVDs include 8 episodes each and are very rare to find. The DVDs include episodes that were not aired on Nicktoons Network until late in the show's run as they were considered "unsuitable for television". Between late 2013 and early 2014 though, the entire series was released to Starz Media's YouTube page.

== See also ==
- Fly Tales – Another show created by Lewis Trondheim
