= Minuscule 2: Mandibles from Far Away =

- Theatrical release poster
- Directed by: Hélène Giraud; Thomas Szabo
- Produced by: Philippe Delarue
- Music by: Mathieu Lamboley
- Production companies: Le Pacte; Éditions Montparnasse; Futurikon; Ifilmfilm Entertainment; France 3 Cinema; B Media; SofiTVCine; The Yard; Supamonks Studio
- Distributed by: Le Pacte; Éditions Montparnasse (France); Praesens Film (Switzerland)
- Release dates: 9 September 2018 (Toronto International Film Festival); 30 January 2019 (France)
- Running time: 92 minutes
- Countries: France; China; Switzerland
- Budget: €13 million

Minuscule 2: Mandibles from Far Away (released in the UK as A Minuscule Adventure) is a 2018 French adventure comedy live action animated film based on the TV show Minuscule and a sequel to Minuscule: Valley of the Lost Ants. it premiered at the Toronto International Film Festival on September 9, 2018, and was released theatrically in France on January 30, 2019.

== Plot ==
Years after Cox the ladybug and Mandible the black ant defeated Butor the red ant, Cox is now raising his litter with his mate and are busy stockpiling food for winter. One day, Junior, one of Cox's kids who yearns for independence, leaves the group and tries to carry an apple he finds to their home. However, Toofete the fly and his gang steal it, having survived due to their ability to return from the afterlife. Cox leads them on a chase that ends with the flies being trapped on a spider's web, which then crashes and kills them. Cox and Junior then return home and hibernate for the winter with the others. Meanwhile, Mandible the black ant and his patrol raid a grocery store to obtain food for the winter, but Butor and his colony attack them, seeking revenge against Cox and Mandible. Separated from his patrol following a chase into the shipping factory, Mandible uses his antennae to contact Cox for help, who awakens from hibernation and sets off, with Junior tailing him behind.

As Cox and Junior arrive, the ensuing fight results in a tug-of-war for Mandible on a ceiling lamp, ending with the red ants falling into one of several boxes of chestnut jam that are to be shipped around the globe. Junior is hit by the lamp and crash-lands in a box headed for Guadeloupe in the Caribbean. Cox leaves Mandible and hitches a ride on the truck and then on an airplane headed to Guadeloupe. They arrive in Guadeloupe on a cargo plane and are loaded onto a pickup truck, but Cox falls off the truck and onto the beach, while Junior is released and gets lost in the jungle. Cox regains consciousness and, with help from a troop of Caribbean ants, contacts Mandible before setting out to find Junior. After receiving the message, Mandible goes to the sewage pipe and meets with Cox's other friend, the black spider. They set off for Guadeloupe on a modified model ship, but as they are caught in a storm while crossing the Atlantic Ocean, lightning strikes the ship and pops the balloons, causing them to fall into the sea, where a great white shark eats them.

In the jungle, Junior escapes from a praying mantis and crashes into a cave, where he becomes stuck in a jumping spider's web, There, he meets a fly named Gray, a black swallowtail caterpillar, and a black ladybug named Coco, whom he falls in love with. Cox arrives and saves them by dropping a rock on the spider, causing the web to unravel, and Cox and Coco narrowly escape with the others while carrying a comatose Junior. As Gray and the caterpillar return home, Coco takes Cox to her colony's home, where the black ladybugs perform a ritual to help Junior regain consciousness. Meanwhile, Cox continues to try reaching out to his friends, but they are still in the shark's stomach. Two days later, Junior regains consciousness and reunites with Cox; he also begins to bond with Coco as his girlfriend.

One day, construction workers chop down the black ladybug's home to build a resort. While devising a plan to save them, Cox remembers witnessing a black swallowtail caterpillar at the beach defending themselves by emitting a strong odor that causes rashes and green spots, which is why humans consider them dangerous. Cox leaves Junior and Coco to find the caterpillar's home in a banyan tree. However, they follow him anyway and save him from the praying mantis and its gang, but are cornered near a cliff. As they are about to be eaten, Mandible and the black spider arrive to save them, having escaped by using the black spider's music player to force the shark to regurgitate them. The group escape and head for the caterpillar's banyan tree, where the caterpillar that Cox saved guides him to their leader. He decides to help Cox after learning of the construction site by using his antennae to look into his memories. With help from the army, Cox is able to ward off the construction crew, causing the area to be declared caterpillar-infested.

Afterwards, the gang parts ways with their friends and returns home to resume hibernation, while Junior decides to stay behind to be with Coco. In a mid-credits scene, the chestnut box Butor and his colony were stuck in arrives in a restaurant in Beijing, China, where Butor begins to plot their escape and revenge against Cox and Mandible.

== Cast ==
Unlike the first film, where few humans appeared, the film features more human characters. It also features some speech in French, Creole and Mandarin.

- Thierry Frémont as the grocer
- Bruno Salomone as the man who chews gum
- Stéphane Coulon as the driver of the van
- Franck Benezech as the construction manager of the hotel
- Sarah Cohen-Hadria as mother
- Bô Gaultier de Kermoal as the radio operator of the submarine

== Production ==
Part of the filming took place in Guadeloupe, more precisely in the Saintes islands, between June and July 2017.

== Critical response ==
The film received positive reviews from film critics.
