= Fly Tales =

- Series logo, which showcases the fly hatching from its egg in the opening credits.
- Genre: Comedy
- Based on: La Mouche by Lewis Trondheim
- Developed by: Samuel Kaminka; Lewis Trondheim
- Written by: Lewis Trondheim
- Directed by: Norman LeBlanc; Charlie Sansonetti
- Voices of: Brigitte Lecordier; Clement Reverend; Marc Saez
- Countries of origin: Canada; France
- Original languages: Silent; Interjection
- No. of episodes: 65

Production
- Running time: 5 minutes
- Production companies: TVA Films; Futurikon; WDR; HIT Entertainment

Original release
- Network: Teletoon (Canada); France 3 (France); Télétoon (Note: Not related to Teletoon) (France)
- Release: September 5 – December 31, 1999

Related
- Kaput & Zösky

Fly Tales is an animated comedy television series that was made in 1999. It featured the short adventures of a young, curious, friendly fly. The fly would get into sticky situations in settings such as a kitchen, a museum, a gumball machine, etc. but always somehow manages to escape. The show was often shown on Cartoon Network at 5 o'clock in the morning after The Magic Roundabout and before Flying Rhino Junior High, in the UK; the show is also often referred to as an animated sitcom and also had aired on CBBC in the UK during the early to mid 2000s where it would also air in the early hours on weekends. The series also aired in the United States on Fox Family Channel and TV3 in New Zealand. The series is based on a French comic book originally by Lewis Trondheim called La Mouche.

== Episodes ==
| No. | Title | Original release date |
|---|---|---|
| 1 | "All Night Clubbing" | 1999 |
The episode starts out with the fly eating some honey. Fly notices a bee and ends up following it to a nightclub (with currency being honey). Since the fly doesn't have honey at the time, he sneaks in and is later kicked out and chased back to where he first started, having the "security" bow at the fly's feet.
| 2 | "Angel or Devil" | 1999 |
This episode starts out with the fly going into a garbage can to look for food. The fly notices a can with a fish that still has some meat on it. When trying to take some, the fly is confronted by a larger male bug. The bug kicks the fly out. This is where a red fly that looks like a devil tells him to be nasty towards the bigger bug, but as he is going to confront the bug, a blue fly that looks like an angel appears and tells him that he should be nice. The fly tries this and still gets kicked. The episode goes on with the devil fly and the angel fly telling him what to do. The episode ends with the angel and the devil showing the flies both bug heaven and bug hell.
| 3 | "AstroFly" | 1999 |
Fly goes to different planets and is confronted by many different bugs, at the end of the episode, it is revealed that he is not actually in space just on a Planets diorama in the kid's bedroom.
| 4 | "Busy as a Bee" | 1999 |
Currently, there is no description available for this episode.
| 5 | "Desperately Seeking Shoes" | 1999 |
In this episode, the fly's shoes are stolen while asleep and then thrown away when the bug that stole them doesn't like them. When the fly wakes up, he notices that he doesn't have his shoes and spends the whole episode trying to find them or a replacement.
| 6 | "Doctor Fly and Mister Bzz" | 1999 |
In this episode, the fly gets this pink liquid poured on him. The pink liquid reacts badly with fly, turning him into a "monster" who then terrorizes the other innocent bugs while hanging out with the bad ones.
| 7 | "Dog Bug" | 1999 |
| 8 | "Fear of the Dark" | 1999 |
| 9 | "Fly me to the Moon" | 1999 |
This episode starts off with the fly looking up into the sky at the Moon and takes a liking to it, he ends up trying to make his way to the Moon only to get into alsorts of situations on the way. A troublesome insect takes the fly's shoe and throws it resulting in it landing among thousands of other insects shoes which leaves the fly in a situation to find his shoe, he ends up in a hot air balloon and various other sticky situations on the way.
| 10 | "Hair" | 1999 |
| 11 | "Heads up" | 1999 |
| 12 | "Hiccups" | 1999 |
| 13 | "Inside a Dog" | 1999 |
In this episode, Fly finds himself sucked in a dog's mouth. While inside the dog, he causes a lot of trouble for the workers of the dogs insides.
| 14 | "It's a Wonderful Fly" | 1999 |
| 15 | "Mission Control" | 1999 |
| 16 | "Nightmare" | 1999 |
In this episode, you see a giant evil fly who chases a little boy around his house and finally sticks him in a jar just like all the other kids in the room. The episode has a very different ending.
| 17 | "Oh Christmas Tree" | 1999 |
In this episode, Fly is looking for a place to spend his Christmas, but no one wants him. Finally, he finds an old bug who wants to have him stay for Christmas, he also controls the lights on the Christmas tree.
| 18 | "Police Fly" | 1999 |
| 19 | "Rock-a-bye-Fly" | 1999 |
| 20 | "Showtime" | 1999 |
| 21 | "Sleep" | 1999 |
| 22 | "Snowfly" | 1999 |
| 23 | "Soccer Madness" | 1999 |
| 24 | "Superfeast at the Super Market" | 1999 |
| 25 | "Superfly" | 1999 |
| 26 | "The Ants" | 1999 |
This episode starts out with the fly trying to relax when he is chased by a bird. Outsmarting the bird, he comes across a bunch of Army Ants in training. He tries his best to mimic what they do. In the end, the bird shows up again and the fly takes it down and saves the Ant Queen.
| 27 | "The Beach" | 1999 |
The Fly comes across a bunch of bugs in a cooking pot all playing in the liquid like it is water. The fly learns to swim and soon starts to love playing. He does all sorts of things in the water that grab the attention of the other bugs, but the female bug wants all the attention and tries to get it. It ends with all the bugs being poured down the drain by the humans and they end up at the real beach.
| 28 | "The Blind Fly" | 1999 |
The Fly comes across an ugly-looking bug and is afraid of it, he notices other bugs throwing crumbs at it and the fly decides to follow them as they call him over. The bugs trick the fly into looking into a lamp as they flip the switch. This gives the fly temporary blindness and he is helped by the ugly bug. When he can finally see again, he finds that the ugly bug was way nicer than the normal ones. They get back at the other bugs and fly off together.
| 29 | "The Bumble Bee" | 1999 |
Fly and Beetle decide to have some fun when a bumble bee comes around to pollinate the flowers.
| 30 | "The Butterfly's Ball." | 1999 |
| 31 | "The Chocolate Coin" | 1999 |
The fly gets a taste of a kid's chocolate coin and wants to get his hands on more. He notices that the kid had dropped the chocolate coin and as it fell through random places, the fly followed. The coin eventually lands in a bug bank on top of real identical coins. He then tries to get it back through various ways.
| 32 | "The Clones" | 1999 |
Fly finds a machine that if you drop items in it, they duplicate. After replicating his shoe and sugar cubes multiple times, he accidentally falls in himself; making tons of himself.
| 33 | "The Cockroach" | 1999 |
The fly starts off on the roof of a house with pigeons eating bird seed, he follows the seed to meet a cockroach who kicks the fly and tries to get him in various ways, lots more cockroaches join the fun only to be eliminated by a man who has come to clear them out. The fly tries to save them with no appreciation from the cockroaches.
| 34 | "The Comic Strip" | 1999 |
| 35 | "The Cosmos and Beyond" | 1999 |
| 36 | "The Cuckoo Clock" | 1999 |
| 37 | "The Disappearance" | 1999 |
The fly is playing with a little ladybug girl and he gets distracted for a minute. As he is distracted, the little girl goes to get ice cream. After the other bug kids leave, she stays because the guy offers a balloon. She is then kidnapped and taken to the guys house where the fly must get her back.
| 38 | "The Drop Of Orange" | 1999 |
The fly discovers a drop of orange juice on the table of which he then searches for more resulting in various orange objects he tries not always being juice, including a tube of glue. A Mosquito spots the fly and tries to chase him down, ultimately failing on each attempt.
| 39 | "The Factory" | 1999 |
The fly becomes trapped in a glass bottle and thrown into the waste which breaks, he then ends up following the traffic which leads to a factory producing orange juice getting caught up in all sorts of various situations. He ends up sealed inside a bottle of orange juice which is bought by the man in the opening scene and returns back to where he started.
| 40 | "The Fax Machine" | 1999 |
The fly is playing a game that requires a small disc being thrown onto the numbers of a telephone, he accidentally gets sucked into the fax machine and ends up in outer space and sent to an unfamiliar location.
| 41 | "The Fly and the Baby" | 1999 |
The fly starts off in a field being chased by a frog which is then eaten by a bird that is shot by a man. During his travels, he comes across a baby insect protecting him from various mishaps within the field while trying to find its parents.
| 42 | "The Fly and the Beetle" | 1999 |
The fly discovers a frightened worm inside an apple he is eating, he ends up meeting a beetle who accompanies him on the apple. The fly and the beetle then create a unique relationship in which they get caught in various scenarios within the kitchen.
| 43 | "The Fly and the Termite" | 1999 |
| 44 | "The Fly, the Brute and the Beetle" | 1999 |
| 45 | "The Genius" | 1999 |
| 46 | "The Ghost" | 1999 |
Fly accidentally kills a bug when he is trying to teach fly how to jump through a fan to the outside. The bug comes back as a ghost, trying to kill the fly.
| 47 | "The Glutton" | 1999 |
| 48 | "The Gilded Cage" | 1999 |
| 49 | "The Gum Machine" | 1999 |
Fly sees gumballs in a gum machine and squeezes through the money slot to get to them. After almost being crushed by money, he finally makes it to the gumballs only to find that they are next to impossible to eat. He runs into a spider that tries to kill him. Luckily, for the fly, a kid buys a gumball setting both of them free.
| 50 | "The Gym" | 1999 |
| 51 | "The Jungle" | 1999 |
| 52 | "The Matador" | 1999 |
| 53 | "The Museum" | 1999 |
In this episode, the fly goes into a museum where he meets a prehistoric fly. They become very good friends. The fly is saddened when the prehistoric fly becomes futuristic and goes away. Note: In this episode, they act more like a couple than just friends.
| 54 | "The Old House" | 1999 |
| 55 | "The Orchestra" | 1999 |
| 56 | "The Photograph" | 1999 |
This is a paradox episode where the fly goes into a photograph and lives life as a huge fly and as a kid's pet. The kid tries to kill a fly and a bigger fly says not to. When the fly is kicked out of the house for trying to give the kid a night fly (no pun intended), he is seen flying out through the photograph back to a normal size fly and being swatted at by the kid. It then zooms out to show a giant fly.
| 57 | "The Production Line" | 1999 |
| 58 | "The Radio" | 1999 |
| 59 | "The Restaurant" | 1999 |
| 60 | "The Sand Castle" | 1999 |
| 61 | "The Thief" | 1999 |
| 62 | "The Treasure" | 1999 |
| 63 | "The Worm" | 1999 |
| 64 | "Tornado" | 1999 |
| 65 | "Toys" | 1999 |

== See also ==
- Kaput & Zösky - Another show created by Lewis Trondheim.
