= Dragon Hunters =

- Genre: Fantasy; Comedy
- Created by: Arthur Qwak
- Directed by: Norman J. LeBlanc (season 1); Jean-Charles Finck (season 2)
- Voices of: Harry Standjofski; Rick Jones; Sonja Ball; Annie Bovaird
- Theme music composer: The Cure
- Opening theme: "The Dragon Hunters Song" by The Cure
- Composers: Season 1: Philippe Vidor; Olivier Crouet; Hervé Lavandier; Season 2: Fantazio
- Countries of origin: France; Germany; Belgium (season 1); Italy (season 2)
- No. of seasons: 2
- No. of episodes: 52

Production
- Producers: Philippe Delarue; Samuel Kaminka
- Running time: 23 minutes
- Production companies: Futurikon; Your Family Entertainment; Carrimages (season 1); GA&A (season 2)

Original release
- Network: France 3 and Canal J (France); Super RTL (Germany); RTL-TVI and VRT (Belgium)
- Release: January 14, 2006 – July 19, 2012

Dragon Hunters (French: Chasseurs de dragons) is an animated fantasy comedy television series created by Arthur Qwak and produced by the French company Futurikon in co-production with France 3, Super RTL, RTL-TVI (season 1) and Your Family Entertainment (formerly known as RTV Family Entertainment for season 1) with the participation of Canal J, VRT (season 1) and GA&A (season 2) in association with Carrimages (season 1). It follows the adventures of two hunters for hire through a medieval world of floating land masses that is terrorized by a widely varying menace of monsters known collectively as dragons. A 3-D feature film and a videogame based on the same creative universe have also been released.

== Plot ==
Set in a medieval world made of Floating Land Masses, two men, Gwizdo and Lian-Chu, are professional dragon hunters who have known each other since they were children. Perpetually flat broke, they are forced to continually stay at the Snoring Dragon Inn until they can get another dragon-hunting contract to pay their rent. The proprietress of the inn is Jeanneline, a three-time divorcee with two daughters, one of whom is also a professional dragon hunter who doesn't see her mother much.

== Cast and characters ==
=== Main characters ===
Lian-Chu is a sword-wielding, muscle-bound warrior who actually deals out the dragon slaying. In contrast to Gwizdo, he is more kindhearted and honorable. He is also an avid knitter. In the episode "The Conjunction of the Three Moons", it is revealed that his parents were killed by a dragon, and in "Farewell Lian-Chu" it's revealed that they were killed because his uncle did not give notice to the people when the dragon was on his way to the village. He only knows how to count to 10 and can not read and thus depends on Gwizdo for this.

- French voice: Alexis Victor (season 1), Thierry Desroses (season 2), Vincent Lindon (movie)
- English voice: Harry Standjofski (season 1), Forest Whitaker (movie)

Gwizdo is the brains of the group, and negotiates their contracts with the helpless people terrorized by dragons. He is a small, gangly young man who speaks with a New York or New Jersey accent. He and Lian-Chu have known each other since childhood, and were raised together in an orphanage called Mother Hubbard's Farm. He is avaricious, cowardly, egotistical, cynical and unsympathetic, and abuses Hector constantly with violence and insults. However, he has a heart of gold hidden deep inside, which is elicited by Lian-Chu, Zaza or anyone else he considers a close friend. Furthermore, he is charismatic, and therefore something of a lovable rogue. In "The Orphan Farm" it's revealed that his egotism stems from his miserable childhood at Mother Hubbard's Orphan Farm, where he was bullied, abused and called names for being scared all the time. He is the one who can read, write and count at the inn, therefore Lian-Chu and Jeanneline depend on him for business and contracts. He also flies their airship, the St. George, and wears a pilot's cap (which he very rarely takes off) and goggles. A good deal of the time his attempts to exploit others' predicaments leads to failure, either because of some oversight or because his better nature prevails.

- French voice: Ludovic Pinette (series), Patrick Timsit (movie)
- English voice: Rick Jones (season 1), Rob Paulsen (movie)

Hector is their pet dog-like-dragon who does not possess the evil nature or the great size of the ones they hunt and acts like a dog. With his fur and ears he seems to be based on a variation of the Asian dragon (similar to Falkor the Luck Dragon in The Neverending Story). His hobbies are eating and picking on other animals such as chickens or sheep. While Gwizdo is the pilot of the St. George, Hector is required to pedal for the propeller, a task he is not fond of. He speaks with a mixture of grunts and pidgin English.

- French voice: Frédéric Sanchez (series), Jérémy Prévost (movie)
- English voice: Rick Jones (season 1), Dave Wittenberg (movie)

=== Other characters ===
Jennyline runs the Snoring Dragon Inn, where Lian-Chu and Gwizdo live. Lian-Chu and Gwizdo owe her an ever-growing debt for room and board. She is a heavyset woman who is short-tempered, strict, irascible and cynical. She has had three past marriages, which have resulted in Zoria, Zaza and possibly other children. She's in love with Gwizdo and wants to marry him, but he's too scared to commit to a relationship. Her name is given as Jennyline on the DVDs and Janelynn on the official website. The French and German variations of her name are Jeanneline.

- French voice: Murielle Naigeon
- English voice: Sonja Ball (season 1)

Zoe is Jennyline's oldest daughter, and is an accomplished dragon hunter in her own right. Like Zaza, she was inspired by Lian-Chu and Gwizdo at a young age, and trained with them to learn the moves and arts of the business. She is not a resident of the inn and makes few appearances, but is well known by the main characters. A victim of sexism, she has donned a male disguise in some parts to get more bounties, and goes by the name Zoria.

- French voice: Marie Drion (movie)
- English voice: Mary Mouser (movie)

Zaza is Jennyline's youngest daughter. She resides at the Snoring Dragon Inn as an assistant. She idolizes Lian-Chu and has dreams of becoming a dragon hunter when she grows up, of which Jennyline disapproves. She spends most of her time at the inn, but occasionally joins the hunters on quests, often through her own means.

- French voice: Audrey Pic (season 1), Catherine Desplaces (season 2)
- English voice: Annie Bovaird (season 1)

Noble Kayo is an elderly doctor whom the hunters sometimes turn to for advice regarding strange conditions, such as poison and paralysis. While intelligent, he is almost completely blind and a bit absent-minded, which makes having a straightforward conversation with him very difficult. In the French version his name is "Kao", which is pronounced the same as the French word for "chaos".

George and Gilbert Forrestal are a two-brother hunter duo, who know Lian-Chu and Gwizdo from growing up alongside them in the orphanage. They look down on Gwizdo and refer to him as a pipsqueak, and often bring up embarrassing childhood events of his. They see no room for competition, and often try to get the hunters' bounties themselves.

Prince Granion de Bismuth is the youngest son of Queen Clothilda. He is a selfless, noble, and somewhat naive hunter who hunts the dragons for free. His two older brothers were killed in dragon battles.

== Episodes ==
=== Season 1 (2006–07) ===
| No. | Title | Original release date |
|---|---|---|
| 1 | "The Name Is Dragon" | January 14, 2006 |
A dragon makes its nest on the roof of the inn.
| 2 | "It's a Dragon's Life" | January 21, 2006 |
Hector runs away to pursue life in the wild.
| 3 | "Desperately Seeking Zoria" | January 28, 2006 |
Gwizdo, Lian-Chu, and Hector search for the missing Zoria.
| 4 | "The Return of Roger" | February 4, 2006 |
Jennyline's seemingly benign ex-husband Roger returns.
| 5 | "Little Rumble On the Prairie" | February 11, 2006 |
Zaza finds a map leading to a dragon and forces Gwizdo and Lian-Chu to take her with them.
| 6 | "The Isle of Mist" | February 18, 2006 |
Monks hire Gwizdo and Lian-Chu to kill a dragon that protects the Isle of Mist.
| 7 | "A Fist Full of Veggies" | September 9, 2006 |
Gwizdo and Lian-Chu help some starving Zimbrenelle dwarves fend off a night dragon.
| 8 | "Dead Dragon Walking" | October 7, 2006 |
The female society of Amazoomia needs the hunters' help killing a dragon that is stealing its children.
| 9 | "The Deep North Dragon" | October 14, 2006 |
Jennyline gets fed up with Gwizdo's tab and throws him out of the tavern.
| 10 | "Billy Toughnut" | (help) |
Gwizdo and Lian-Chu's old friend Billy Toughnut hires them to protect his wife from a dragon.
| 11 | "There's No Place Like Home!" | October 25, 2006 |
Jennyline prepares a feast for a noble lord, who requests a fresh dragon.
| 12 | "The Strange Taste of Cocomak" | October 29, 2006 |
An invisible dragon with the ability to camouflage begins stalking the hunters.
| 13 | "The Conjunction of the Three Moons" | November 6, 2006 |
Lian-Chu returns to his village to hunt down the dragon that murdered his family and friends.
| 14 | "Don't Look Now" | November 13, 2006 |
Gwizdo and Lian-Chu fight against a dragon that can turn its enemies into stone.
| 15 | "Unwelcome Guests" | November 27, 2006 |
A wealthy merchant comes to the inn looking to take over. Gwizdo, fearing eviction, infests the entire tavern with dragons called Smacklings.
| 16 | "The Kiwajel Thrust" | December 4, 2006 |
A mysterious rival has been stealing the dragon hunters' contracts.
| 17 | "Gland of the Mimikar" | December 11, 2006 |
Lian-Chu is poisoned by a dragon and can only be healed by the gland of a Mimikar. Gwizdo must overcome his cowardice to hunt down the Mimikar alone.
| 18 | "For a Few Veggies More" | November 20, 2006 |
The hunters pretend to be bounty hunters and "hunt" themselves to appease the vengeful Zimbrenelle dwarves.
| 19 | "The Orphan Farm" | TBA |
Gwizdo and Lian-Chu return to their orphanage only to find it in ruins.
| 20 | "Child's Play" | TBA |
Zaza goes off on her first mission to kill a dragon that's been terrorizing an island.
| 21 | "The Collywoble Water" | TBA |
To exploit a rich island, Gwizdo has Hector pose as a vicious dragon.
| 22 | "Who's Lost Their Head Now?" | TBA |
Gwizdo and Lian-Chu bring back a Sizzler dragon's head, but the body comes looking for it.
| 23 | "Baby-Love, Oh Baby-Love" | TBA |
Gwizdo falls for a pretty young blonde and even offers his services for free.
| 24 | "Can I See Your License Please?" | TBA |
Gwizdo and Lian-Chu discover they aren't registered as official dragon hunters.
| 25 | "Prince Charming" | TBA |
Prince Charming arrives at the tavern and charms the whole community.
| 26 | "The Family Fortune" | TBA |
Gwizdo pretends to be the long lost son of a rich couple.

=== Season 2 (2007–12) ===
| No. | Title | Original release date |
|---|---|---|
| 27 | "Dragontagious" | July 2007 |
Lian-Chu is diagnosed with Dragontagious.
| 28 | "The Borbacks' Cemetery" | TBA |
Lian-Chu and Gwizdo lead an expedition to find a dragon trophy.
| 29 | "The Shipwrecker" | TBA |
Gwizdo offers to rid an island of their dragon problem.
| 30 | "Treasure Rock" | TBA |
The dragon hunters reunite with Zoria who is with the pirates, a book that tells of a fabulous treasure and Gwizdo is one of the few people who can read. Gwizdo quickly deciphered the location of the treasure, Zoria have trained a dragon to power the flying ship and the dragon reacts to her emotions, Zoria has fallen in love with the handsome drifter Malo. But as they reach their goal, Zoria soon painfully learns that Malo was never really serious about her and it becomes dangerous when the dragon goes berserk, the mysterious person who have been following Malo turns out to be someone similar to Zoria.
| 31 | "Dragon in the Heart" | TBA |
Zaza is surprised to discover a shadow dragon in the hearth.
| 32 | "The Cure" | TBA |
Lian-Chu and Gwizdo hunt a dragon they're forbidden to attack.
| 33 | "The High Life" | TBA |
Gwizdo poses as Prince Charming during the royal wedding, a grave mistake.
| 34 | "Farewell, Lian-Chu" | TBA |
Lian Chu gets a mail to him that hasn't arrived to him for years. His uncle, of whose existence the dragon hunter was completely unaware, wants to adopt him. Lian Chu is happy to have finally found a family member but Gwizdo is not, they have a fall out and decide to go their separate ways. Lian Chu tries his luck in his uncle's salt mine and Gwizdo's forced to hire Ulrik the Toothless as a replacement. During his stay with his uncle, Lian Chu learns the truth from his uncle about the night of the dragon destroyed the village.
| 35 | "Porkfester's Pigfarm Island" | TBA |
Hector is left with simple instructions to watch Zaza's pig.
| 36 | "The Stuff of Dreams" | TBA |
Infected by a dragon's poison, Gwizdo falls into a coma.
| 37 | "Baby in the Family" | TBA |
The heroes hunt the dragon responsible for the death of a prince.
| 38 | "She Loves Me, She Loves Me Not... She Loves Me!" | TBA |
Lian-Chu is under the spell of a rare love potion.
| 39 | "The Sweetypie Clause" | TBA |
Gwizdo discovers the castle he inherited is a dump and the pet is a huge dragon.
| 40 | "Agheegoo" | TBA |
The heroes are hired to eliminate a Skeeoor, a dragon-squirrel.
| 41 | "Combat Spores" | TBA |
Zaza brings home a strange plant that multiplies.
| 42 | "The Convoy" | TBA |
The heroes unravel the mystery behind a surprise dragon attack.
| 43 | "The Legend of the Rain Dragon" | TBA |
The hunters hesitate to eliminate a dragon that's the protector of a village's harvest.
| 44 | "By the Book" | TBA |
Gwizdo is kidnapped by the Forrestal brothers.
| 45 | "Drago Menta" | TBA |
A sly dragon hunter tricks the gang into pursuing a dragon that possesses mind control.
| 46 | "The Grand Tournament" | TBA |
The hunters enter a local knitting contest.
| 47 | "The Body Beautiful" | TBA |
Gwizdo has face surgery that will grant him access into the castle.
| 48 | "The Master of the Dragon" | TBA |
The hunters pursue a dragon protected by a local boy.
| 49 | "City Bound" | TBA |
Gwizdo hatches a plan to steal a dragon's egg.
| 50 | "Hell Around Town" | TBA |
Gwizdo falls prey to a con artist.
| 51 | "Ghost Hunters" | TBA |
Jennyline enlists the hunters to stop a dragon's ghost from haunting the tavern.
| 52 | "The Red Dragon" | July 19, 2012 |
Gwizdo has been kidnapped by the Red Dragon.

== Broadcast ==
The program was featured in the United States on Cartoon Network for a few weeks around January 2006, but, after having its time slot moved, vanished from the line-up. It returned in September 2006, only to disappear again in October 2006. Up until June 2007, it was available for viewing on Cartoon Network Video. In 2011, it was airing in the U.S. on Starz Kids & Family; all 52 episodes were available for purchase and streaming on Amazon Video via Starz, broken down into six "seasons"; 6 episodes, 10 episodes, 10 episodes, 6 episodes, 10 episodes and 10 episodes, respectively. 50 of the 52 episodes were available in English on Netflix through their partnership with Starz though the episodes were released out of order.

It has also aired in the United Kingdom and other European countries on Cartoon Network alongside France 3 (France), RTL-TVI (Belgium), Super RTL (Germany) and others.

A second season of 26 episodes began airing in France in August 2007. International releases of both seasons have occurred in over 70 countries. A fanbase was formed in Arabic speaking countries, due to being broadcast on MBC 3. In October 2017, the series premiered in Bangladesh on Duronto TV, dubbed in Bengali.

== Home media ==
Geneon has released five DVDs (containing episodes 1 - 17) in the U.S. and Canada.

- Dragon Hunters Vol. 1: "It's A Dragon's Life" containing episodes 1 - 4
- Dragon Hunters Vol. 2: "Dead Dragon Walking" containing episodes 5 - 8
- Dragon Hunters Vol. 3: "There's No Place Like Home!" containing episodes 9 - 11
- Dragon Hunters Vol. 4: "Don't Look Now" containing episodes 12 - 14
- Dragon Hunters Vol. 5: "Unwelcome Guests" containing episodes 15 - 17

== Other media ==
=== Collectors game ===
The Die Drachenjäger (Dragon Hunters) collectors' game was created and distributed by Dracco Company Ltd, which was a new addition to the Dracco Company's merchandise. The game, released in Belgium, featured forty collectible figurines that resembled the monsters, dragons, and the heads of the main characters, Lian Chu, Gwizdo, Zaza, Hector, and Jennyline. The game plays identically to Dracco Heads.

A collection of figurines has also been featured by Revell.

=== Junior novelizations ===
A series of junior novelizations of the episodes were published in France.

=== Comics ===
The comic series Chasseurs de Dragons was published by Delcourt in France and co-edited in the US by Peace Arch.

=== Movie ===
Directed by Guillaume Ivernel (who also art directed the film) and Arthur Qwak, and produced by Futurikon co-founder Philippe Delarue, a full-length computer-animated 3D movie was made by Mac Guff Ligne Paris, Futurikon and Trixter Film GmbH. The film is a prequel to the series, with Lian Chu, Gwizdo and Hector as roving travelers, and a young Zoria, then known as Princess Zoe.

A four-minute teaser was shown in both the Annecy Animation Festival and the Marché du Film in 2007.

It premiered on March 19, 2008 in Russia, and on March 26 in Belgium and France, and premiered 2010 in Mexico. It premiered on April 5, 2008 in the United States as part of the Sarasota Film Festival. Rob Paulsen confirmed at a convention interview that he and Forest Whitaker were respectively voicing Gwizdo and Lian Chu.

== Covers ==
- The show's theme, "The Dragon Hunters Song", is performed by the English rock band The Cure. The Cure took their song : 'Taking off' and changed it up for the show's theme. This track was available as a single and a track on the German compilation CD Toggo Music 11 in 2005, both now out of print.

== References to popular culture ==
- The air vehicle that Lian-chu, Gwizdo and Hector ride on is named after St. George.
- The floating landscapes featured in the series are inspired by the fantasy artwork of Roger Dean, traditional Chinese Shan shui paintings as well as the landscapes of German painter Caspar David Friedrich.
