= Ranger Rob =

Children's television series

- Genre: Children's television series Fantasy
- Created by: Alexander Bar
- Developed by: Andrew Sabiston; Carolyn Hay
- Directed by: Adrian Thatcher (season 1); Derek Prout (seasons 2–3); Ruth Ramirez (season 3); Glen Pollock (post-production)
- Voices of: Jonah Wineberg; Ari Resnick; Darren Frost; Helen King; Zachary Bennett; Stephanie Anne Mills; Emily Delahunty; Robert Tinkler; Justice James; Caleb Bellavance
- Theme music composer: Carl Lenox; Dalbello
- Countries of origin: Canada; United Kingdom (season 1)
- Original language: English
- No. of seasons: 3
- No. of episodes: 66

Production
- Executive producers: Colin Bohm; Scott Dyer; Alexander Bar; Ian Liddell; Irene Weibel
- Producer: Vanessa Esteves
- Running time: 24 minutes
- Production companies: Studio Liddell (season 1); Nelvana

Original release
- Network: Treehouse TV (Canada); Tiny Pop (UK)
- Release: 5 September 2016 – 13 June 2021

Ranger Rob is an animated children's television series created by Alexander Bar. The series debuted on Treehouse TV in Canada on 5 September 2016, and ended on 13 June 2021. It was produced by Nelvana in Canada, and Studio Liddell in the United Kingdom. In the United States, it aired on Universal Kids and is currently airing on UniMás.

== Plot ==
Ranger Rob is about a ranger named Rob, and his fellow friends Stomper and Dakota, who go on outdoor adventures in Big Sky Park.

== Characters ==
=== Main ===
- Rob (voiced by Jonah Wineberg in seasons 1–2 and Ari Resnick in season 3) is the young ranger who loves nature and adventure. When he grows up, He wants to be just what like his parents are: a head ranger at BSP.
- Stomper (voiced by Darren Frost) is Rob's best friend. He is a yeti. Stomper has 3 cousin yeti/sasquatches in addition to a friend who is a larger creature who looks like a tree with a big dog head named "Ogly-Pogly", an ogre of sorts.
- Dakota (voiced by Stephanie Anne Mills in seasons 1–2 and Emily Delahunty in season 3) is Rob's other friend who always surprises him by swinging on a vine to drop by and say hello.

=== Recurring-supporting ===
- Rob's mom (voiced by Helen King)
- Rob's dad (voiced by Zachary Bennett)
- Chipper (voiced by Robert Tinkler) is his car that has a lot of abilities.
- Sam (voiced by Justice James in seasons 1–2 and Caleb Bellavance in season 3) is Rob's number one fan. He wants to be a ranger like Rob when he grows up.

== Production ==
The second season of Ranger Rob was greenlit in 2017 and was released in the following year in June. The third season was released in October 2020.

== Episodes ==
=== Series overview ===
Series	Episodes	Originally released	
Series	Episodes	First released	Last released
1	26	5 September 2016	29 March 2017
2	14	2 June 2018	16 September 2018
3	26	26 October 2020	13 June 2021

=== Season 1 (2016–17) ===
No. overall	No. in season	Title	Written by	Storyboards by	Original release date	Prod. code
1	1	"The Woolly Wiligo of Big Sky Park"	Carolyn Hay and Andrew Sabiston	Eugene McDermott	5 September 2016	101
1	1	"Big Sky Park Elephant Train"	Carolyn Hay	Eugene McDermott	6 September 2016	101
Rob tries to find Stomper's long lost cousin, the Woolly Wiligo, to prove it's real. Rob takes a shortcut when leading elephants to the safari and they go rogue through the park.
2	2	"Trouble at the Big Sky Park Oasis"	Carolyn Hay	Nick Hehn and Kerry Sargent	7 September 2016	103
2	2	"Garbage Growlers of Big Sky Park"	Andrew Sabiston	Nick Hehn and Kerry Sargent	8 September 2016	103
During a sandstorm in the desert, Rob gets carried away building a storm shelter for park visitors. It looks like a mythical beast is littering the park so Rob and Stomper try to catch it.
3	3	"The Lost Yeti Treasure of Big Sky Park"	Carolyn Hay	Nick Hehn and Cory Wilson	9 September 2016	104
3	3	"Ranger Ready"	Andrew Sabiston	Nick Hehn and Cory Wilson	10 September 2016	104
Rob and Stomper go on a quest for the lost yeti treasure using Dad's cool new gadget. A test run of a new ride at Big Sky Park puts Rob's ranger rescue skills to the test.
4	4	"Ranger Rob's Penguin Patrol"	Carolyn Hay	Cory Wilson and Nick Hehn	11 September 2016	102
4	4	"My Pet Ranger"	Andrew Sabiston	Cory Wilson and Nick Hehn	12 September 2016	102
When trying to get a lost penguin home, Rob gets sidetracked because the penguin is so much fun. A baby chameleon grows attached to Rob because he spends too much time with it.
5	5	"Rob's Big Sky Park Parade"	Andrew Sabiston	Eugene McDermott and Kerry Sargent	13 September 2016	107
5	5	"A Ranger Style Celebration"	Jed MacKay	Eugene McDermott and Kerry Sargent	14 September 2016	107
When Rob is put in charge of calling campers to dinner, he turns it into a rousing parade. When things do not go as planned, a celebration for Dakota turns into an even better day.
6	6	"Chipper's Big Sky Park Stunt Show"	Andrew Sabiston	Eugene McDermott and Kerry Sargent	15 September 2016	105
6	6	"The Big Sky Park Desert Dash"	Carolyn Hay and Andrew Sabiston	Eugene McDermott and Kerry Sargent	16 September 2016	105
Rob accidentally uses up all of Chipper's power before a stunt show he is supposed to do. Rob and Stomper enter the Desert Dash, even though Stomper is not sure he can do it.
7	7	"Monkey Business in Big Sky Park"	Shawn Kalb	Cory Wilson and Nick Hehn	17 September 2016	108
7	7	"Big Present in Big Sky Park"	Rob Tinkler	Cory Wilson and Nick Hehn	18 September 2016	108
Rob and Stomper try to build a fort in the jungle but are challenged by a pesky monkey. Rob and Stomper must deliver an ice sculpture to the other side of the park before it melts.
8	8	"The Yeti Yodelhorn"	Jeff Detsky	Eugene McDermott and Kerry Sargent	19 September 2016	109
8	8	"Ranger Rob Rocks"	Louise Moon	Eugene McDermott and Kerry Sargent	20 September 2016	109
Trouble ensues when Rob and Stomper play with a yeti artifact they're meant to leave alone. Rob sets out to take some fun selfies of him and Stomper with a cool new flying camera.
9	9	"Ranger Rob's Berry Good Adventure"	Jed MacKay	Nick Hehn and Cory Wilson	21 September 2016	110
9	9	"Ranger Hero Man"	Louise Moon	Nick Hehn and Cory Wilson	22 September 2016	110
Rob and Stomper have to find out who's stealing all the strawberries for the Big Berry Bash. Rob tries to be like his comic book hero, Ranger Hero Man, as he, Stomper and Dakota return a yeti statue to its place on a mountaintop.
10	10	"Ranger Rob's Peak Adventure"	Jed MacKay	Eugene McDermott and Kerry Sargent	23 September 2016	111
10	10	"Big Sky Park Animal Sitters"	Shawn Kalb	Eugene McDermott and Kerry Sargent	24 September 2016	111
An exciting mountain climb leads to Rob finding out how Night Light Mountain got its name. Rob accidentally lets some baby animals loose and has to use all his wits to get them back.
11	11	"Big Help in Big Sky Park"	Rob Tinkler	Nick Hehn and Cory Wilson	13 October 2016	112
11	11	"Ranger Rob and Ranger Dad"	Jed MacKay	Nick Hehn and Cory Wilson	13 October 2016	112
Rob volunteers to help clean a campsite, but then goes to work with Chipper, which seems like more fun. Rob and his Dad plan to spend a day together and wind up with a mystery to solve when they discover that all of the water from the swimming hole has vanished.
12	12	"Big Stink in Big Sky Park"	Jed MacKay	Eugene McDermott and Kerry Sargent	14 October 2016	113
12	12	"A Ranger Campfire Story"	Louise Moon	Eugene McDermott and Kerry Sargent	14 October 2016	113
When a mysterious bad smell fills the forest just before the Big Sky Barbecue is about to start, Rob has to find out what's causing it or the barbeque will be ruined. Rob sets out to find an exciting new tale to tell for Campfire Story Night and ends up having a great adventure with Stomper while chasing after a runaway Rollaround Ride ball.
13	13	"Desert Stones in Big Sky Park"	Louise Moon	Nick Hehn and Cory Wilson	15 October 2016	114
13	13	"The Big Sky Park Frosty Fields Challenge"	Andrew Sabiston	Nick Hehn and Cory Wilson	15 October 2016	114
Rob teams up with Stomper and Sam to find stone puzzle pieces his mom has hidden in the desert and puts them together to discover an amazing surprise. Ranger Rob and the kids sign up to participate in a field challenge. However, when he is paired with Dakota he has to adjust to working with someone new.
14	14	"A Champion Ranger"	Carolyn Hay and Andrew Sabiston	Nick Hehn and Cory Wilson	6 March 2017	106
14	14	"Big Sky Park Junior Ranger Training"	Story by : Carolyn Hay; Teleplay by : Carolyn Hay and Andrew Sabiston	Nick Hehn and Cory Wilson	7 March 2017	106
Rob helps a famous athlete find his gold medal by doing all the activities he did that day. When Rob leads Junior Ranger Training class, a rescue makes real Junior Rangers of everyone.
15	15	"A Real Ranger"	Jed MacKay	Chris Cann, Kerry Sargent and Cory Wilson	6 March 2017	115
15	15	"Rumble in the Big Sky Park Jungle"	Louise Moon	Chris Cann, Kerry Sargent and Cory Wilson	7 March 2017	115
Caught without his gear, Rob must put his ranger wits to good use in order to rescue a baby penguin in trouble. A strange rumble in Big Sky Park is frightening the residents. With help from Dakota and Stomper, Rob investigates the mystery behind the strange sound.
16	16	"Bigskyosaurus"	Louise Moon	Nick Hehn and Eugene McDermott	8 March 2017	116
16	16	"Yeti Sheddy in Big Sky Park"	Rob Tinkler	Nick Hehn and Eugene McDermott	9 March 2017	116
Rob and Stomper build a giant remote-control dinosaur. Rob searches for a lost item while Stomper's shedding fur causes no end of trouble.
17	17	"A New Trail in Big Sky Park" "A New Yeti in Big Sky Park"	Louise Moon	Chris Cann and Nick Hehn	12 March 2017	118
17	17	"Leaping Lizards of Big Sky Park"	Carolyn Hay	Chris Cann and Nick Hehn	13 March 2017	118
Rob must track giraffes through the jungle by himself when Stomper trains Sam to be a yeti. Rob and Stomper take care of a crate of leaping lizards, but accidentally open the lid.
18	18	"Big Surprise in Big Sky Park"	Carolyn Hay	Chris Cann and Cory Wilson	14 March 2017	119
18	18	"Ranger Ready or Not"	Brendan Russell	Chris Cann and Cory Wilson	15 March 2017	119
Rob's surprise party for Mom and Dad is challenged when some animals get out of control; Dakota has to keep Mom and Dad from coming in too early while Rob takes control of the situation. Rob gets Stomper to hide so he can sharpen his tracking skills trying to find him; Stomper hides so well that the game becomes a rescue mission.
19	19	"Ranger Rob and Ranger Sam"	Mike Erskine-Kellie	Nick Hehn and Eugene McDermott	16 March 2017	120
19	19	"Marching Penguins in Big Sky Park"	Katherine Sandford	Nick Hehn and Eugene McDermott	16 March 2017	120
Rob teaches Sam how to be a Ranger, but hits a snag when Sam is set on copying Rob exactly. Rob and Stomper build a snow wall to protect the penguins during the annual March of the Penguins, but a little penguin gets lost and they have to find him before things get even more complicated.
20	20	"Giraffes on the Move in Big Sky Park"	Anne-Marie Perrotta	Chris Cann and Cory Wilson	17 March 2017	121
20	20	"Pack Penguins in Big Sky Park"	Mike Erskine-Kellie	Chris Cann and Cory Wilson	17 March 2017	121
Rob learns how to move a group of giraffes to safety, but one giraffe doesn't want to budge. When Rob imitates some penguin calls, he has no idea about the trouble it's going to cause.
21	21	"Ranger Rob the Snake Handler"	Jed MacKay	Nick Hehn and Eugene McDermott	20 March 2017	122
21	21	"Stuffy Stories in Big Sky Park"	Anne-Marie Perrotta	Nick Hehn and Eugene McDermott	21 March 2017	122
Rob has to find a rare snake that has disappeared just before Nick Nature comes to film it. Rob takes his stuffy on one last adventure before giving it to someone who needs it more.
22	22	"Muddy Mayhem in Big Sky Park"	Penelope Laurence	Chris Cann and Kirk Jorgensen	22 March 2017	123
22	22	"Treasure Time in Big Sky Park"	Mike Erskine-Kellie	Chris Cann and Kirk Jorgensen	23 March 2017	123
Rob winds up on an adventure in elephant wrangling while spreading the word about an event. An old and mysterious treasure map sends Rob, Dakota and Stomper on an exciting treasure hunt for not one, but two, buried treasures.
23	23	"Mystery Mischief in Big Sky Park"	Andrew Sabiston	Nick Hehn and Eugene McDermott	24 March 2017	124
23	23	"Yeti Forgetti in Big Sky Park"	Carolyn Hay	Nick Hehn and Eugene McDermott	25 March 2017	124
Rob wonders who keeps causing trouble in the park and discovers it's a sleepwalking Stomper. Stomper gets a brain freeze from eating a snow cone and thinks he's Ranger Rob.
24	24	"Earth Day in Big Sky Park"	Carolyn Hay and Andrew Sabiston	Chris Cann and Cory Wilson	10 March 2017 (part 1)	117
24	24	"Earth Day in Big Sky Park"	Carolyn Hay and Andrew Sabiston	Chris Cann and Cory Wilson	11 March 2017 (part 2)	117
Rob has to stop two bad park visitors from stealing all the animals for their pet collection.
25	25	"Big Sky Park's Discovery Day"	Carolyn Hay and Andrew Sabiston	Chris Cann and Kirk Jorgensen	26 March 2017 (part 1)	125
25	25	"Big Sky Park's Discovery Day"	Carolyn Hay and Andrew Sabiston	Chris Cann and Kirk Jorgensen	27 March 2017 (part 2)	125
Rob finds a never before discovered part of Big Sky Park, and makes two new yeti friends. Rob and his friends attend a party to celebrate the day Big Sky Park was discovered.
26	26	"A Big Sky Park Strongyeti Challenge"	Andrew Sabiston	Nick Hehn and Kirk Jorgensen	28 March 2017	126
26	26	"Big Rescue in Big Sky Park"	Carolyn Hay and Andrew Sabiston	Nick Hehn and Kirk Jorgensen	29 March 2017	126
Rob leads Stomper and Woolly to ever-greater achievements of strength, but the fun causes trouble. Rob tests Chipper's skills and has his own rescuing skills tested when Chipper gets stuck.

=== Season 2 (2018) ===
No. overall	No. in season	Title	Written by	Storyboards by	Original release date
27	1	"Deer Trackers of Big Sky Park"	Carolyn Hay and Andrew Sabiston	Rob Walton and Alex Szewczuk	2 June 2018
27	1	"Yeti Beach Party in Big Sky Park"	Carolyn Hay and Andrew Sabiston	Rob Walton and Alex Szewczuk	2 June 2018
When Rob sets out to track deer with a high tech gadget, he relies on the gadget instead of his instincts and ends up on a wild goose chase. Rob rushes setting up new storm sensors so he can help Stomper deliver invitations for a beach party. Rob forgets to turn the sensors on and no one sees a big storm coming.
28	2	"Tree Planters of Big Sky Park"	Carolyn Hay and Andrew Sabiston	Christopher Richard and Elizabeth Estee	3 June 2018
28	2	"Snow Rollers in Big Sky Park"	Carolyn Hay and Andrew Sabiston	Christopher Richard and Elizabeth Estee	3 June 2018
Rob and Stomper challenge Mom and Dad in a competition to see who can plant more trees; Stomper complicates things when he starts feeding some animals. Rob finds penguin eggs and, with Dakota, he looks for its parents; then, they discover a strange natural phenomenon that happens to adult penguins.
29	3	"Trailblazers of Big Sky Park"	Carolyn Hay and Andrew Sabiston	Rob Walton and Alex Szewczuk	9 June 2018
29	3	"Signal Masters in Big Sky Park"	Carolyn Hay and Andrew Sabiston	Rob Walton and Alex Szewczuk	9 June 2018
Rob gets to blaze a new trial. Rob counts the number of gazelles in the desert because he is fascinated by these animals; however, this makes Stomper very nervous.
30	4	"Sea Monsters of Big Sky Park"	Carolyn Hay and Andrew Sabiston	Christopher Richard and Nicholas Hehn	10 June 2018
30	4	"Bug Hunters of Big Sky Park"	Carolyn Hay and Andrew Sabiston	Christopher Richard and Nicholas Hehn	10 June 2018
Rob discovers a mysterious aquatic creature and Stomper is afraid it's a sea monster. Rob has to look for rare insects in a cave in the jungle and learn their names; Stomper believes that this mission is a great opportunity to test his new equipment.
31	5	"A Ranger Stakeout"	Carolyn Hay and Andrew Sabiston	Rob Walton and Alex Szewczuk	16 June 2018
31	5	"Rangers vs. Yetis"	Carolyn Hay and Andrew Sabiston	Rob Walton and Alex Szewczuk	16 June 2018
Rob, Stomper, and Dakota try to solve the mystery of what animal is taking things from around the ranger station; Stomper gets very carried away being a Yeti detective. Rob and Stomper captain opposing Yeti ball teams. Determined to win, they don't give their teammates much of a chance to improve during practice. As a result, their game comes off the rails.
32	6	"A Ranger's Best Friend"	Carolyn Hay and Andrew Sabiston	Christopher Richard, Nicholas Hehn and Ruth Ramirez	23 June 2018
32	6	"A Ranger and a Hawk Talker"	Louise Moon	Christopher Richard, Nicholas Hehn and Ruth Ramirez	23 June 2018
When Rob fills the watering holes, he comes across a symbiotic relationship between a hippo and a bird. Stomper feels inspired, and goes over the top trying to help Rob. When a hawk swoops down on extreme sports champion Carter Wells, Rob discovers the bird is just defending its nest, and saves Stomper and the hawk's eggs from falling off Sky High Cliff.
33	7	"Ranger Ready for Rhino"	Anne-Marie Perrotta	Rob Walton and Alex Szewczuk	30 June 2018
33	7	"Ranger Rhino Watch"	Carolyn Hay and Andrew Sabiston	Rob Walton and Alex Szewczuk	30 June 2018
The sanctuary is overrun with mud due to a leaky pipe, which Rob must fix in time for a new baby rhino's arrival. Meanwhile, Stomper prepares a yeti welcome for the baby. A baby rhino is released from an animal sanctuary into the jungle, and Rob is on 'rhino watch' to make sure it's okay. Meanwhile, Stomper overprotects the rhino like an expectant big brother.
34	8	"Ranger Rob, Plant Defender"	Anne-Marie Perrotta	Christopher Richard and Nicholas Hehn	5 August 2018
34	8	"A Buzzy Day in Big Sky Park"	Patrick Granleese	Christopher Richard and Nicholas Hehn	5 August 2018
Squirrels keep eating the plants in the park's community garden, so Rob and Dakota try to find ways to keep them out. Meanwhile, Stomper plants a yeti bean that grows into a beanstalk. Rob and Stomper have to deliver a queen bee to a part of Big Sky Park that the bees have disappeared from. Stomper's desire to learn a new dance causes the queen to escape en route.
35	9	"Whale Watchers of Big Sky Park"	Louise Moon	Rob Walton and Alex Szewczuk	12 August 2018
35	9	"Forest Rangers of Big Sky Park"	Patrick Granleese	Rob Walton and Alex Szewczuk	12 August 2018
Rob and Dakota go to see some whales and Rob rescues a whale that got caught in a net; Stomper finds a cure for a disease when he gets his feet in the water. Rob and Stomper find a new use for fallen trees in the forest. When Rob uses the river to float the trees, he puts too many in the river at once and causes a dam that threatens the salmon.
36	10	"Good Vibrations in Big Sky Park"	Patrick Granleese	Christopher Richard and Nicholas Hehn	19 August 2018
36	10	"A Ranger Observation Station"	Anne-Marie Perrotta	Christopher Richard and Nicholas Hehn	19 August 2018
There is an earthquake in Big Sky Park and Rob goes to check on the animals; meanwhile, Stomper celebrates a special day to thank nature, but things get complicated. Rob and his friends build a viewing platform on a tree, to watch birds without bothering them. However, there is confusion when everyone tries to step on it at the same time.
37	11	"Little Feet in Big Sky Park"	Louise Moon	Rob Walton and Alex Szewczuk	26 August 2018
37	11	"A Big Sky Park Eclipse"	Carolyn Hay and Andrew Sabiston	Rob Walton and Alex Szewczuk	26 August 2018
Rob and Dakota team up to find the source of a cloud of smoke and mysterious footprints. The yetis lost a special stone.
38	12	"The Snow Monkey King of Big Sky Park"	Patrick Granleese	Christopher Richard and Nicholas Hehn	2 September 2018
38	12	"A Hole Lot of Trouble in Big Sky Park"	Louise Moon	Christopher Richard and Nicholas Hehn	2 September 2018
Rob and Stomper set out to observe snow monkeys. Rob looks for a lost phone.
39	13	"A Very Ranger Christmas"	Carolyn Hay and Andrew Sabiston	Rob Walton and Alex Szewczuk	9 September 2018
39	13	"A Very Yeti Christmas"	Carolyn Hay and Andrew Sabiston	Rob Walton and Alex Szewczuk	9 September 2018
On Christmas Eve, Santa calls Rob for help to find his missing sleigh. It's a race against time to save Christmas, but when Rob and friends band together miracles can happen. Rob learns about yeti holiday customs.
40	14	"Recycle Rangers of Big Sky Park"	Patrick Granleese	Christopher Richard and Nicholas Hehn	16 September 2018
40	14	"Rangers Yeti of Big Sky Park"	Carolyn Hay and Andrew Sabiston	Christopher Richard and Nicholas Hehn	16 September 2018
During a mission to replace old trail signs with new ones, Rob finds a new use for the ones he's taken down. At Stomper's Yeti Give Away, Stomper accidentally gives away his 'Lucky Lint.' Rob trains the yetis to be yeti rangers when Mom and Dad are sick. While the yetis don't exactly do things the "ranger way", Rob is amazed at how helpful they can be.

=== Season 3 (2020–21) ===
The third season, consisting of 52 11-minute episodes, was released in October 2020.

No. overall	No. in season	Title	Directed by	Written by	Storyboards by	Original release date
41	1	"The Best Animal in Big Sky Park"	Derek Prout	Amy Brown	Greg Collinson and Rob Walton	26 October 2020
41	1	"Brush Your Tusks in Big Sky Park"	Ruth Ramirez	Miles Smith	Greg Collinson and Rob Walton	26 October 2020
Rob sets out to take the cover photo for the new Big Sky Park newsletter. When bad elephant breath stinks up the jungle it's up to Rob to brush their tusks.
42	2	"One Itchy Yeti in Big Sky Park"	Derek Prout	Phil Ivanusic-Vallée	Nicholas Hehn and Brad Overall	27 October 2020
42	2	"Rob Saves the Scragglefruit"	Ruth Ramirez	Betsy Walters	Nicholas Hehn and Brad Overall	27 October 2020
When Stomper falls into some poison ivy, Rob and Dakota need to find a way to cure his itchies. Stomper finds a rare scragglefruit seed.
43	3	"Super Bloom in Big Sky Park"	Derek Prout	Louise Moon	Greg Collinson and Alex Greychuck	28 October 2020
43	3	"Happy Campers in Big Sky Park"	Ruth Ramirez	Miles Smith	Greg Collinson and Alex Greychuck	28 October 2020
Rob and Stomper investigate a mysterious super bloom of flowers in the Desert and rescue a trapped gazelle from falling rocks. Rob and Stomper launch food all over Big Sky Park and have to clean it up.
44	4	"Big Bug Mix up in Big Sky Park"	Derek Prout	Phil Ivanusic-Vallée	Troy Sullivan, Brad Overall and Elizabeth Estee	29 October 2020
44	4	"A Space Yeti in Big Sky Park"	Ruth Ramirez	Amy Brown	Troy Sullivan, Brad Overall and Elizabeth Estee	29 October 2020
Rob and Stomper need to track down missing garden bugs that help Woolly's garden. A meteorite crashes in Big Sky Park.
45	5	"Natural Artists of Big Sky Park"	Derek Prout	Betsy Walters	Greg Collinson and Rob Walton	30 October 2020
45	5	"Noisy Neighbors in Big Sky Park"	Ruth Ramirez	Betsy Walters	Greg Collinson and Rob Walton	30 October 2020
Rob spills paints that he needs for a project and replaces them with colors produced by nature. Stomper's rehearsals for the Yeti Yubaloo cause trouble for some of the forest creatures.
46	6	"Big Beach Clean-Up in Big Sky Park"	Derek Prout	Amy Brown	Jason Armstrong and Brad Overall	23 November 2020
46	6	"Saving the Hatchlings in Big Sky Park"	Ruth Ramirez	Phil Ivanusic-Vallée	Jason Armstrong and Brad Overall	23 November 2020
Rob and Stomper meet new friends Marina and Bubbles when they clean up the Jungle Beach. Rob and the gang need to help baby sea turtles reach the ocean.
47	7	"The Great Training Challenge of Big Sky Park"	Derek Prout	Betsy Walters	Greg Collinson and Rob Walton	24 November 2020
47	7	"Narwhals of Big Sky Park"	Ruth Ramirez	Amy Brown	Greg Collinson and Rob Walton	24 November 2020
Rob and Stomper pair up for a triathlon event to try to beat Mom and Dad's record. Stomper has a loose tooth and he is determined to get it to the Narwhal Yeti Tooth Fairy.
48	8	"Bandits in Big Sky Park"	Derek Prout	Diana Moore	Jason Armstrong and Brad Overall	25 November 2020
48	8	"A Warthog in Big Sky Park"	Ruth Ramirez	Phil Ivanusic-Vallée	Jason Armstrong and Brad Overall	25 November 2020
Rob, Stomper, and Dakota track down stolen wrist coms in a desert full of meerkats. Rob and Stomper decide to throw a welcome party for a new arrival in the park, a playful warthog named Morty.
49	9	"Calls of the Wild in Big Sky Park"	Derek Prout	Miles Smith	Greg Collinson, Alex Szewczuk and Rob Walton	26 November 2020
49	9	"Fossil Finder Keepers in Big Sky Park"	Ruth Ramirez	Amy Brown	Greg Collinson, Alex Szewczuk and Rob Walton	26 November 2020
Rob records animal calls in the jungle when a Macaw causes chaos by mimicking the calls. Stomper uses yeti strength to dig for a dinosaur skeleton.
50	10	"Lemonade Stand in Big Sky Park"	Derek Prout	Diana Moore	Jason Armstrong and Brad Overall	27 November 2020
50	10	"A Hairy Day in Big Sky Park"	Ruth Ramirez	Carolyn Hay and Andrew Sabiston	Jason Armstrong and Brad Overall	27 November 2020
Rob and Stomper run out of water for lemonade, then go on a desert adventure to find more. Stomper is Park Pal of the Month so wants to look his best but goes overboard with Rob's help.
51	11	"Winging It in Big Sky Park"	Derek Prout	Miles Smith	Greg Collinson and Rob Walton	28 December 2020
51	11	"The Deep Sea Divers of Big Sky Park"	Ruth Ramirez	Phil Ivanusic-Vallée	Greg Collinson and Rob Walton	28 December 2020
In search of the bird that belongs to a giant feather he found, Rob discovers an ostrich that thinks Stomper is her chick. Rob dives deep into the ocean to find a pearl to fix Mom's special ring.
52	12	"Learning the Ranger Ropes"	Derek Prout	Amy Brown	Jason Armstrong, Brad Overall and Alex Szewczuk	29 December 2020
52	12	"A Yeti Sleepover in Big Sky Park"	Ruth Ramirez	Hugh Duffy and Andrew Sabiston	Jason Armstrong, Brad Overall and Alex Szewczuk	29 December 2020
Stomper wants to take a ropes course but is afraid of falling from heights and hurting the animals below. Using an ancient yeti technique to boost his confidence, he climbs to the top of the tallest tree. Frank and Gertie sleep over at Stomper's and prove to be very excitable guests.
53	13	"Sam 'n Go Seek"	Derek Prout	Diana Moore	Greg Collinson and Rob Walton	30 December 2020
53	13	"Lights, Camera, Big Sky Park"	Ruth Ramirez	Amy Brown	Greg Collinson and Rob Walton	30 December 2020
During a game of Sam 'n Go Seek, Rob, Stomper and Dakota try to find Sam hiding in the jungle. Rob, Stomper, Marina and Bubbles make a movie about leaf cutter ants.
54	14	"The Big Sky Park Egg Hunt"	Derek Prout	Phil Ivanusic-Vallée	Jason Armstrong and Brad Overall	31 December 2020
54	14	"A Rainy Ranger Day"	Ruth Ramirez	Phil Ivanusic-Vallée	Jason Armstrong and Brad Overall	31 December 2020
During an egg hunt, Stomper and Bubbles collect real eggs by accident. A rainy day means the park's Spring Festival needs to move indoors to the Ranger Station.
55	15	"Squirrel it Away in Big Sky Park"	Derek Prout	Miles Smith	Greg Collinson and Rob Walton	1 January 2021
55	15	"Bubbles' Birthday Surprise in Big Sky Park"	Ruth Ramirez	Amy Brown	Greg Collinson and Rob Walton	1 January 2021
When the friendship bracelet Bubbles made for Stomper is stolen by a squirrel, Stomper fears he and Bubbles will no longer be friends. When Marina wants to throw a surprise party for Bubbles on her birthday, Rob and Stomper distract Bubbles for the day.
56	16	"Connect the Dots in Big Sky Park"	Derek Prout	Hugh Duffy and Carolyn Hay	Jason Armstrong and Brad Overall	16 March 2021
56	16	"Feeling Antsy in Big Sky Park"	Ruth Ramirez	Miles Smith	Jason Armstrong and Brad Overall	16 March 2021
Rob wants to see constellations in the sky so Mom suggests a camp out at night. Chipper gets ants in his circuitry and starts behaving like one.
57	17	"Easy Sneezy in Big Sky Park"	Derek Prout	Miles Smith	Jason Armstrong and Brad Overall	20 March 2021
57	17	"A Big Sky Park Snow Show"	Ruth Ramirez	Diana Moore	Jason Armstrong and Brad Overall	20 March 2021
Rob goes on a pirate treasure hunt with Stomper. An unseen force jeopardizes Rob and the gang's Snow Show in the Frosty Fields.
58	18	"The Lost Mine of Big Sky Park"	Derek Prout	Amy Brown	Greg Collinson and Rob Walton	21 March 2021
58	18	"Migration Frustration in Big Sky Park"	Ruth Ramirez	Miles Smith	Greg Collinson and Rob Walton	21 March 2021
While searching for crystals, Rob and Stomper find a lost mine. Rob guides giraffes to a new watering hole.
59	19	"Switcheroo Day in Big Sky Park"	Derek Prout	Miles Smith	Jason Armstrong and Brad Overall	27 March 2021
59	19	"Ranger Robot in Big Sky Park"	Ruth Ramirez	Hugh Duffy and Carolyn Hay	Jason Armstrong and Brad Overall	27 March 2021
Rob has to return animals to their proper sections of the park. Rob creates a mini-robot that is always one step ahead of him.
60	20	"Ogety Jokety in Big Sky Park"	Derek Prout	Carolyn Hay and Andrew Sabiston	Greg Collinson and Rob Walton	28 March 2021
60	20	"Lunchtime Launchtime in Big Sky Park"	Ruth Ramirez	Hugh Duffy and Andrew Sabiston	Greg Collinson and Rob Walton	28 March 2021
When Rob and Stomper encounter some tricks, they think they know who did it. Rob and Stomper are excited when Dakota invites them for a picnic lunch in the jungle.
61	21	"Outfoxed in Big Sky Park"	Derek Prout	Miles Smith	Jason Armstrong and Brad Overall	30 March 2021
61	21	"Ranger Restaurant in Big Sky Park"	Ruth Ramirez	Miles Smith	Jason Armstrong and Brad Overall	30 March 2021
Rob has to find a Grey Fox a new home. Rob reopens the Castle Restaurant and has unexpected guests.
62	22	"Nest Quest in Big Sky Park"	Derek Prout	Miles Smith	Jason Armstrong and Alex Szewczuk	3 April 2021
62	22	"Stickin' Around in Big Sky Park"	Ruth Ramirez	Amy Brown	Jason Armstrong and Alex Szewczuk	3 April 2021
When Rob films eagles building a nest, Stomper and Bubbles build a nest of their own. Stomper borrows Woolly's lucky stepping stick and accidentally breaks it.
63	23	"Eye Spy in Big Sky Park"	Derek Prout	Story by : Desmond Sargeant; Teleplay by : Carolyn Hay and Andrew Sabiston	Greg Collinson and Rob Walton	4 April 2021
63	23	"Horsin' Around in Big Sky Park"	Ruth Ramirez	Phil Ivanusic-Vallée	Greg Collinson and Rob Walton	4 April 2021
Rob and Marina explore all the different ways animals in Big Sky Park can see. When unexplained events occur in the forest, Rob is surprised to discover it's a wild horse.
64	24	"Horse Power in Big Sky Park"	Derek Prout	Diana Moore	Greg Collinson and Rob Walton	23 May 2021
64	24	"Turbine Trouble in Big Sky Park"	Ruth Ramirez	Amy Brown	Greg Collinson and Rob Walton	23 May 2021
Rob has to fix a washed out bridge but Chipper gets stuck in the muddy riverbank. Rob tries to build a wind turbine, but gets in trouble when he doesn't follow the directions.
65	25	"Big Sky Park Talent Show"	Derek Prout	Amy Brown	Greg Collinson and Rob Walton	6 June 2021
65	25	"A Morty Mystery in Big Sky Park"	Ruth Ramirez	Hugh Duffy and Andrew Sabiston	Greg Collinson and Rob Walton	6 June 2021
Rob and his friends put on a talent show. When a warthog makes a strange call in the savannah, Rob has to find out what it means.
66	26	"Stump the Ranger in Big Sky Park"	Derek Prout	Hugh Duffy and Carolyn Hay	Jason Armstrong and Brad Overall	13 June 2021
66	26	"Surprising Stripes in Big Sky Park"	Ruth Ramirez	Carolyn Hay and Andrew Sabiston	Jason Armstrong and Brad Overall	13 June 2021
Rob plays a game with Mom and Dad to try to find an animal fact they don't know. After Rob paints a fence black and white, he thinks a horse has leaned on it when it's actually a zebra.

== Broadcast ==
Ranger Rob premiered on Treehouse TV in English Canada on 5 September 2016.

In the United States, the show debuted on Sprout on 8 July 2017. The series also airs on Super RTL in Germany, TF1 in France, TVNZ 2 in New Zealand, Minimax in Central Europe and premiered on Tiny Pop in the UK on 17 March 2018.

The series premiered on NET. in Indonesia on 1 May 2019.

Ranger Rob debuted on Cartoon Network Asia's Cartoonito block on 28 March 2022. It also debuted on Boomerang Asia's Cartoonito block on 2 May of the same year.

== Home media ==
In 2018, Cinedigm signed a deal with Nelvana Enterprises to secure the North American DVD rights to Ranger Rob.

== Awards and nominations ==
Year	Award	Category	Recipients and nominees	Result	References
2017	YMA Awards	Award of Excellence for Best Program, Animation, Ages 3–5	Episodes "The Woolly Wiligo of Big Sky Park" / "A Big Sky Park Elephant Train"	Nominated	
