= Futurikon =

Paris-based animation and production studio

- Industry: Animation; Live action
- Founded: 1996; 30 years ago
- Founder: Philippe Delarue
- Headquarters: Paris, France
- Key people: Philippe Delarue (CEO)
- Products: Television series Feature films Documentaries
- Website: www.futurikon.com/en

Futurikon is a French animation and production studio based in Paris. It specializes in the production and distribution of animated and live action television series, feature films and documentaries, including the Minuscule franchise.

== Works ==
=== Feature films ===
==== Animation ====
- The Ugly Duckling and Me! (2006)
- Dragon Hunters (2008)
- Minuscule: Valley of the Lost Ants (2013)
- Minuscule 2: Mandibles from Far Away (2019)

==== Live-action ====
- Playground Chronicles (2012)

=== Animated series ===
- Chronokids (2016)
- Brico Club, aka Crafty Kids Club (2012)
- Trolls of Troy (2013–2014)
- Captain Biceps (2010–2011)
- A Cow, A Cat and the Ocean
- Dragon Hunters (2006–2012)
- Flatmania (2004–2008)
- Fly Tales (1999)
- Gloria, Wilma and Me
- How to Draw?
- Iron Nose
- Kaput & Zösky (2002–2003)
- Lucas and Emily
- Sweet Little Monsters (2011–2018)
- Malo Korrigan (2003)
- The Minimighty Kids (2008–2019)
- Minuscule (2006–2012)
- Monster Allergy (2006–2009)
- Pop Secret
- The Ugly Duckling and Me
- Willa's Wild Life (2008–2009)

=== Documentaries ===
- Audacious
- Journey to the West
- Terra Magica
- This Mute Memory

=== As distributor ===
- The Ugly Duckling and Me!
