= Orson and Olivia =

- Genre: Comedy-drama
- Written by: Jean-Louis Bachellier; Yann le Pennetier; Véronique Herbaut
- Directed by: Arthur Qwak
- Starring: Bruno Raina; Aurélia Bruno; Marine Boiron; Patricia Legrand; Thierry Ragueneau; Gérard Loussine; Michel Papineschi; Monique Thierry; Gérard Rinaldi
- Composer: Yves de Bujadoux
- Countries of origin: Italy; France
- Original languages: Italian; French
- No. of seasons: 1
- No. of episodes: 26

Production
- Executive producer: Philippe Grimond
- Running time: 24 minutes
- Production company: Ellipsanime

Original release
- Network: TF1
- Release: March 8, 1993 – 1993

Orson and Olivia is an animated comedy-drama television series produced by Ellipse Entertainment and aired on TF1. It features the trials of two orphans living in London under Queen Victoria's reign. It is based on the French comics series Basil et Victoria by Edith and Yann, which got a complete English-language book edition in 2014 under the title "Basil & Victoria: London Guttersnipes".

The series also aired in several countries around the world such as Rai Uno in Italy, TVP3 in Poland, Sky One in the UK, ABC in Australia, MetroVision and TV3 in Malaysia, Channel 5 in Singapore, KiKa in Germany, TVI in Portugal, SABC2 in South Africa, Showcase and Canal Famille in Canada, RTÉ Two in Ireland, HBO in New Zealand, Minimax in Hungary and ERT and K-T.V. in Greece.

== Summary ==
Orson and Olivia are two eleven-year-old orphans who live on a boat in the St Katharine Docks. They have to find food in order to survive and catch rats to make money. They also get into various situations with their friends. These include brushes with the law, encountering people from foreign countries and meeting Queen Victoria, Sherlock Holmes, Lewis Carroll and Charles Dickens.

== Characters ==
=== Main ===
- Orson – Orson is a young bald orphan, who lives on a boat with his best-friend/girlfriend Olivia. He tries to earn money by catching rats. Calm, attentive and with a noble soul, he sees himself as someone who is destined for great things. His favourite food is herring.
- Olivia – Olivia is a young redhead orphan, who lives on a boat with her best-friend/boyfriend Orson. Just like Orson, she makes a living catching rats. Hot-headed, stubborn, but with a good heart, Olivia dreams that one day she will become an artist, known by everyone in London. Her favourite food is sausages. She is prone to having vivid dreams or nightmares, which in most cases illustrate some of her biggest wishes or fears.
- Faltstaff – Orson and Olivia's faithful dog, who is called by his human family as the best rat-catcher in all of London.
- Fleabag – Fleabag is a young orphan who's friends with Orson and Olivia. He spends his time at the docks trying to find ways to earn money, while bragging about his false talents. He has a crush on Olivia, even though she treats him badly, insisting that she only likes Orson.
- Teddy – Teddy is a young orphan who is friends with Orson and Olivia. From the whole group, Teddy is the only one who can read and write, and is usually the one who tells the others the news around town as he works as a newspaper boy.
- Ricky Dripnose – Ricky is a young orphan who is a big fan of Sherlock Holmes, following all of his cases and even wearing a deerstalker hat just like Sherlock himself. He is also known for having a great singing voice, using it to earn money.
- Froggy – Froggy is a young blonde orphan who makes a living as a street artist, dealing in acrobatics. She lives with Teddy and Fleabag.
- Pearface – Pearface is a chubby, bald orphan, who spends his time selling matches on the street. His favourite hobby is to eat all kinds of delicious foods, especially pudding and cakes.

=== Recurring ===
- Chief Inspector Lestrade – Lestrade is a bumbling and sometimes incompetent inspector for Scotland Yard. Whenever he crosses paths with Orson and Olivia, he usually does not pay attention to what they tell him, always saying that he has the investigation under control.
- Sherlock Holmes and Dr. Watson – Sherlock Holmes and Dr. Watson are a famous detective duo, who solve all kinds of mysteries, thanks to Holmes deductive reasoning method. On more than one occasion, Holmes and Watson did help Orson and Olivia, and unlike Lestrade, the detectives tend to believe everything the orphans tell them.
- Queen Victoria – Queen Victoria is the ruler of the British Empire. Over the course of their adventures, Orson and Olivia cross paths with her more than once.
- Robex the Cut-Throat – Robex is a diabolical murderer who is captured by Sherlock Holmes, with the help of Orson and Olivia. Later on, he is convicted of 7 homicides, but manages to escape and swears revenge on the detective and the orphans for putting him in prison. He is recaptured by Holmes, after trying to kill Orson and Olivia.
- Greg – Greg is the local poultier's son and leader of a rival gang who frequently antagonise Orson, Olivia and their friends.

== Episodes ==
Episode	Title
1	Henrietta
2	The Music Hall
3	The Crown Jewels
4	The Conquerors of the North Pole
5	Black Hoof
6	The 37th Duke of Sutherland
7	Heart of Stone
8	Dancing Eyes
9	The Marahjah's Children
10	The Bomb
11	A Shameful Wager
12	Baobab
13	Mister William
14	Jim the Docker
15	The Squatting Scribe
16	20th Century Woman
17	The Revenge of Robbex
18	Exit Please
19	April Fools
20	Faltstaff's Bird
21	The Swans from the Thames
22	Oochy-Coochy
23	The Other Side of the Fog
24	The Pink Ribbon
25	Romeo and Olivia
26	The Christmas Pudding
