= Minuscule: Valley of the Lost Ants =

- Theatrical release poster
- Directed by: Futurikon Films; Thomas Szabo
- Written by: Hélène Giraud; Thomas Szabo
- Produced by: Philippe Delarue
- Starring: Jean-Paul Guyon; Sarah Cohen-Hadria
- Cinematography: Dominique Fausset
- Edited by: Valérie Chappellet
- Music by: Hervé Lavandier
- Production companies: Futurikon; Entre Chien & Loup; Nozon; 2d3d Animations; Cofanim; Backup Media; Le Pacte; Éditions Montparnasse
- Distributed by: Le Pacte; Éditions Montparnasse (France); Cinéart (Belgium)
- Release dates: 17 November 2013 (Tallinn); 29 January 2014 (France); 26 February 2014 (Belgium)
- Running time: 89 minutes
- Countries: France; Belgium
- Budget: €10.2 million
- Box office: $22.8 million

Minuscule: Valley of the Lost Ants (French: Minuscule : La Vallée des fourmis perdues) is a 2013 live-action/animated adventure comedy film based on the television series Minuscule. The film was written and directed by series creators Hélène Giraud and Thomas Szabo. It is a sound film with a synchronized soundtrack featuring music and sound effects and with little to no spoken dialogue. It won the César Award for Best Animated Feature Film at the 40th César Awards. A sequel, Minuscule 2: Mandibles from Far Away, was released on January 30, 2019.

== Plot ==
In a valley in southeastern France, a family of ladybirds has their first litter and raises them until they are ready to become independent. The childish fly Toofette and his gang often bully Cox, one of the litter. During one of these fights, Cox attempts to fly back to his family, but as they pursue him, he crashes into a crevice and loses a wing. Unable to fly or locate his family, Cox takes shelter in a sugar cube tin which is part of an abandoned picnic. The next morning, Cox awakens as bugs have raided the picnic and carry away the spoils. A foraging patrol of black ants finds the picnic and begins to carry the tin to their anthill with Cox still inside. They allow him to join them after he protects them from a hungry green lizard. On their journey, Cox befriends Mandible, the ant patrol's leader.

Cox and the black ants encounter face-to face a patrol of red ants and their leader, the dictator Butor, who try to stop them to get their food. Mandible tries to give them a sugar cube as a peace offering, but enraged Butor and his patrol pursue them to get the rest. The group escapes by riding the tin down an embankment and into a river, with the red ants pursuing them in a soda can. At the rapids, Cox falls overboard and the ants rescue him from a pike named Boboche. As they go over a waterfall and the tin washes ashore, the soda can and Boboche sink to the bottom of the river. While the red ants escape, Boboche gets stuck in the sand and suffocates to death. The black ants pick up the sugar cubes and start hauling them back to their nest. After finding the tin empty, Butor continues to pursue them. However, his troop flees to avoid being run over by a car, leaving Butor to follow the black ants to their anthill and return to his colony to report to his queen and get reinforcements. Meanwhile, his patrol returns home to rejoin his armies.

While traveling to the black ant's territory, Cox meets another family of ladybirds and tries to join them. He falls in love with a female member, but since he cannot fly, he decides to stay with the ants as his new family. Eventually, they arrive at the anthill, where Mandible invites him to join the colony and they present the sugar cubes to their queen. At midnight, Cox dreams of flying with both families and his girlfriend, but despite regaining some of his strength, he is still unable to fly. The next morning, Butor and his patrol, the queen, and the red ant colony followers lay siege to the black ant nest via slingshots. After a few feeble attempts to fight back with various objects, Cox and Mandible bring out a pack of fireworks, but their only match is used up to light one. Cox remembers that there was a matchbox at the picnic and, now able to fly again, escapes into the forest to retrieve it.

At the picnic area, Cox finds the matchbox, but before he can fly back with it, a black spider runs off with the matchbox to its dollhouse home in a sewage pipe that Cox had come across with his family. Cox follows him into the house, where a frog named Jean-Paul tries to eat them. The duo fight back and Jean-Paul is seemingly killed after the house topples onto him. After bonding with the spider, Cox persuades him to give him the matches and sets out with them back to the nest. Along the way, he saves his lover, who has reached independence and has left her family, from Toofette's gang, who are killed after a chase ends in them being hit by a car.

Cox returns to the besieged fortress, now half-demolished, and with the matches, Mandible and the black ants are able to light the remaining fireworks. The explosions start a wildfire in the forest, which drives the red ant colony away, with Butor swearing revenge for them. A fire and rescue plane patrol arrives and extinguishes the wildfire, saving Cox, Mandible, and the black ants, but flattening the nest in the process. In the aftermath, the colony begins rebuilding, while Cox returns to the meadow to raise his new family with his partner. A few years later, they return to the newly rebuilt ant nest and Cox and his old friend watch the sunset. In a mid-credits scene, the ant who was storing the objects used to defeat the bunch of red ants manages to complete a number sliding puzzle.

== Home media ==
Minuscule was released on both DVD and Blu-ray in France on 26 August 2014. It was later released in a Blu-ray collection together with its sequel, Minuscule - Mandibles from Far Away, on 5 November 2019.

== Accolades ==
- Nominated: 2013 Tallinn Black Nights Film Festival (Best Children's Film)
- Nominated: 27th European Film Awards (Best Animated Feature Film)
- Nominated: San Sebastian International Film Festival (Best Animated Feature Film)
- Official preselection: Academy Awards (Academy Award for Best Animated Feature) and BAFTA Awards (BAFTA Award for Best Animated Film)
- Won: Mill Valley Film Festival (San Francisco) (Children's FilmFest Gold Award)
- Won: Chicago International Children's Film Festival (Honorary Prize)
- Won: China International Cartoon and Animation Festival (Silver cup prize for the animated film)
- Won: 5th Magritte Awards (Magritte Award for Best Foreign Film in Coproduction)
- Won: 40th Cesar Awards (César Award for Best Animated Feature Film)
