= Arthur Qwak =

French animator and comic-book writer

- Born: François Hemen; December 25, 1961 (age 64); France
- Occupations: Animator, comic-book writer, director
- Years active: 1985–present
- Known for: Orson and Olivia; Dragon Hunters; Oscar's Oasis
- Notable work: Le Soleil des loups; Dragon Hunters (film and series)
- Children: Félix Hemmens

Arthur Qwak (born as François Hemen, December 25, 1961) is a French animator and comic-book writer.

== Career ==
In 1985, Qwak founded the studio Asylüm together with his fellow artists and writers Cromwell, Riff Reb's, Kisler, Édith Grattery, Gilles Gonnort and Ralph. He also worked as a storyboard artist and layout artist on the animated films Asterix in Britain and Asterix and the Big Fight, both produced by Gaumont in the late 1980s.

In 1987, he created his first comic book, Le Soleil des loups (The Sun of the Wolves), which won the Debut Prize at the Angoulême International Comics Festival in 1988.

Qwak made his first series in 1992 at the Ellipse studio (Canal+) - Orson and Olivia, based on Basil and Victoria by Yann and Edith.

In 1998, he met Valérie Hadida, then Guillaume Ivernel and Fred Engel Lenoir, with whom he worked on the project Dragon Hunters – a feature-length animated film using computer graphics, released in 2008. In 2005, he released a comic book Lola Cordova, which was republished in 2020 by Akiléos.

== Family ==
His son is Félix Hemmens, guitarist for the band BB Brunes.

== Filmography ==
- Orson and Olivia (television series, 26 episodes)
- Sonic Underground (television series, 14 episodes)
- Malo Korrigan (television series, 26 episodes)
- Dragon Hunters (television series, 26 episodes)
- Dragon Hunters (2008 movie)
- Oscar's Oasis (television series, 72 episodes)

== See also ==
- Lola Cordova
