= Helen King (actress) =

Scottish-Canadian actress (born 1972)

- Born: 1 March 1972 (age 54); Dunfermline, Fife, Scotland
- Citizenship: Scotland; Canada
- Education: Queen's University
- Occupation: Actress
- Years active: 1998–present

Helen King (born 1 March 1972) is a Scottish-born Canadian actress and puppeteer.

== Biography ==
King graduated from Queen's University Department of Drama in 1994, moving to Montreal, Quebec in 1995. As well as acting for independent local companies, King worked for Centaur Theatre, Geordie Productions, Just for Laughs Theatre and Theatre Lac Brome. . She starred as the voices of Fumiko & Lisa in Discovery Kids' Jacques Cousteau's Ocean Tales, was narrator for the acclaimed documentary "Black Coffee" and the travel series Rails of Adventure and was a guest voice on several other voice series including Totally Spies, Arthur, Creepschool, Mona the Vampire, and Potatoes & Dragons. She relocated to Toronto in early 2006, continuing her voice-over career in various animation and commercial projects. She has received widespread attention for taking over the role of Farah in The Two Thrones, an installment in Ubisoft's popular Prince of Persia video game series. She has acted in the movies Still Life, Wedding Night, and The Ghosts of Dickens' Past.

== Filmography ==
=== Film ===
- The Ghosts of Dickens' Past (1998, as Servant Rebecca)
- Nuit de noces (2001, as Petite femme de chambre)
- Amnesia: The James Brighton Enigma (2005, as Journalist)
- Still Life (2007, as Tax Clerk)
- Angora Napkin (2009, as Molly)

=== Television ===
- Misguided Angels (1999, one episode, as Clare)
- Arthur (2000, 1 episode, as Suzette)
- Mona the Vampire (2003, 1 episode, as Roberta Gotto / Robot)
- Kaput & Zösky: The Ultimate Obliterators (2002–2003, 6 episodes, as various)
- Potatoes and Dragons (2004, 78 episodes, as Big Mama / Miss Leafy)
- Creepschool (2004, 2 episodes, as Enchanted Mirror / Video Game)
- Canadian Case Files (2005, 1 episode, as Kittye Schmidt)
- Runaway (2006, 1 episode, as Family Member)
- Odd Job Jack (2007, 2 episodes, as Lawyer / Trish)
- Magi-Nation (2007–2008, 6 episodes, as Shimmer / Baby Orathan / Swip/ Weave hyren)
- Toot & Puddle (2008, 1 episode, as Arara)
- Dex Hamilton: Alien Entomologist (2009, 1 episode, as Black Widow)
- The Amazing Spiez! (2009, 2 episodes, as Melinda / Boss)
- Cyberchase (2009, 1 episode, as Razzle; 2022, 1 episode, as Crustacea)
- Being Erica (2009, 2 episodes, as Woman #1 / Co-worker #2)
- Pearlie (2009, 1 episode, as Astrid / Lady Person)
- Caillou (2010, 1 episode, as Eye Doctor)
- The Dating Guy (2010, 2 episodes, as Fiona / Jeanie)
- Redakai: Conquer the Kairu (2012, 1 episode, as Slanva)
- Murdoch Mysteries (2012, 1 episode, as Mrs. Wilson)
- Fugget About It (2012, 7 episodes, as Dancer / Field Girls Leader / Rita)
- Ella the Elephant (2012, 1 episode, as Ms. Everheart)
- Hemlock Grove (2013, 1 episode, as Librarian)
- Sidekick
- Reign (2015, 1 episode, as Deputy's Wife)
- The ZhuZhus (2016, 1 episode, as Teacher)
- Ranger Rob (as Rob's Mom)
- Dot. (2016, as Rangeroo Leader)
- Rusty Rivets Ranger Anna, recurring role
- Corn & Peg
- Glowbies (2021, 26 episodes, as Alby)

=== Video games ===
- Prince of Persia: The Two Thrones (2005, as Farah)

== Sources ==
- Terrace, Vincent (2008). Encyclopedia of Television Shows, 1925 through 2010, 2d ed. McFarland. ISBN 978-0-7864-8641-0.
