= Malo Korrigan =

- Created by: Eric Paul Marais
- Directed by: Arthur Qwak; Norman J. LeBlanc
- Voices of: Terrence Scammell; Eleanor Noble; Luis de Cespedes; Rick Jones; Sheena Larkin
- Theme music composer: Deep Forest
- Composer: Olivier Crouet
- Country of origin: Canada; France; Germany
- Original languages: English; French
- No. of episodes: 26

Production
- Executive producers: Philippe Delarue; Samuel Kaminka; Paul Cadieux; Wolfgang Heidrich
- Producer: Reinhard Kasper
- Running time: 23 minutes
- Production companies: Futurikon; Tooncan Productions, Inc. Ravensburger Film + TV

Original release
- Network: Super Écran (Canada); M6 (France); Canal J (France)
- Release: 2002 – 2002

Malo Korrigan (full English title Malo Korrigan and the Space Tracers, French title Malo Korrigan et les Traceurs de l'espace) is an animated television series with 26 episodes, created by Eric Paul Marais and directed by Arthur Qwak and Norman J. LeBlanc of Futurikon. It is a French-Canadian-German co-production between Futurikon, Tooncan Productions, Inc. and Ravensburger Film + TV and distributed by M6 Métropole Télévision and Canal J. The English theme song is an original song composed for the TV series by Deep Forest. It was first aired in France during 2002; and later aired in the UK, Canada, Spain, Zimbabwe, Russia, Namibia, Kenya and on SABC1 in South Africa.

== Synopsis ==
After a centuries long intergalactic war, peace finally reigns in the universe. More than 200 planets have joined together to form the Cosmocratic League with the aims of maintaining the peace and promoting the economic development of space. Interplanetary transport has become a vital service in maintaining the stability and unity of the League, with vast profits being made by some companies, such as the powerful and ruthless Krill-Fireng Consortium. Only a handful of independents remain, rebellious and valuing their freedom, facing many dangers to deliver their cargo in record times. They are the Tracers, and the most famous of them all is Malo Korrigan and his crew aboard their ship, the Starduke.

== Characters ==
Malo Korrigan

Voiced by: Alain Zouvi (French); Terrence Scammell (English)

A taciturn, but extremely gifted pilot, Malo Korrigan was one of the best in the Consortium's fleet. Condemned to a long jail term for opposing his employer's methods, he joined the Tracers on his release from prison. Like all the independent pilots, Korrigan is an enthusiastic defender of freedom, a mixture of adventurer and smuggler who sells his services to the highest bidder, carrying out perilous missions on the borders of the League. But, the captain of Starduke cannot prevent himself from helping the weakest and regularly finishes his missions owing more than he did at the beginning.

Jonas Pequod

Voiced by: André Montmorency (French); Rick Jones (English)

Grumpy, but also generous and courageous, this veteran space navigator is a fan of rock'n'roll. A do-it-yourself genius, he is able to repair almost anything, thanks to his flexible artificial hand. It is therefore quite natural that he would become the Starduke's engineer. The only problem is that Jonas is also the cook, and in that he is far from successful.

Cyana Baahra

Voiced by: Manon Arsenault (French); Eleanor Noble (English)

Although she is a genuine alien princess and young graduate of the Federal Academy of Space Navigation, Cyana chose to become a pilot with the Tracers. Hired by Malo Korrigan, Cyana wonders if she is worthy of the confidence placed in her by Malo and Jonas. An expert fighter and highly intelligent, she takes enormous risks to please her friends and satisfy her own curiosity. Even if she doesn't always understand the mentality of rebels, like all Tracers, Cyana would prefer to fight the injustices she sees.

Yago Carcharias

Voiced by: Luis de Cespedes (French; English)

A man without scruples, Carcharias is the chief henchman of the Consortium. Cruel and relentless, he is a true predator without compassion, responsible for the dirtiest operations. Intelligent, and therefore dangerous, Carcharias does not accept failure or defeat by the Tracers and in particular by Malo Korrigan. Only the obligation to save face in the eyes of the federal authorities, temper his will to do harm.

== Episodes ==
No.	Title	Original release date
1	"Sio Dolderan" "Sio Dolderan"	TBA
Perched on his space-scooter, Sio Dolderan criss-crosses the Universe filled with rage. This young man is the last of the Zubaheuls, dedicated to his hatred of the Consortium and its leader who was responsible for the destruction of his clan. His infinite desire for revenge, blinds him and has pushed him to the edges of the law. Malo gets him out of trouble, but Malo is then betrayed whilst carrying explosives in Starduke's hold. Sio Dolderan's intention is clear: to blow up a tanker.
2	"Old Soldier" "Ancien Combattant"	TBA
While traversing the Horsehead Nebula, the Starduke suffers a mechanical failure in the engine. With Starduke adrift in space, Malo and Jonas have an idea: they will land on a nearby planet whose surface covered with the carcasses of old spacecraft left there since the end of the Sewalik wars. But, while our heroes search for spare parts, something observes them, then attacks.
3	"Operation Sharatan" "Opération Sharatan"	TBA
En route to Oort-Kali^{[*]}, the Starduke collides with an old spacecraft which has drifted in space for more than 20 years. Malo and Cyana board the ship and discover a functioning cryogenic chamber containing a young alien girl named Eba Sahäda. She is from the planet Sharatan, and carries a deadly virus. They find out the Consortium is after her, but it is not long before the entire crew is infected with the virus.^{*} Kali was one of the proposed names for Nemesis, a hypothetical companion star orbiting the Sun beyond the Oort cloud.
4	"The Daisukis" "Daïsukis"	TBA
The Starduke is forced to make an emergency landing on an asteroid and finds itself trapped by the rock. While trying to release the ship, Malo and Jonas are attacked by the asteroid, which seems to be defending itself. Cyana must overcome her disgust of the strange telepathic passengers, the Daïsukis, in order to contact the asteroid and save Malo and Jonas.
5	"Breaking the Ice" "Rompre la Glace"	TBA
Yago imprisons Cyana's father, Kairos, and threatens to kill him if the Consortium is not granted the right to exploit the strength-giving ice of the planet Alba Khair. Cyana and Malo quickly race towards planet to foil Yago's plans, despite the fact that Cyana was disowned by her family.
6	"Gruiks" "Gruiks"	TBA
Almost broke, Malo agrees help search for a cargo of Gruiks^{[*]} - a kind of large pig intended for the galactic fast food market - which have disappeared into a stellar vortex. He is accompanied by Mr Smith, the CEO of Gruik Bio-food. The mission, which at first seemed routine, quickly becomes dangerous when Malo discovers that the cargo of pigs have genetically-enhanced intelligence, and are self-aware.^{*} “Gruik”, is a French word meaning the sound that pigs make – equivalent to “Oink” in English.
7	"Living Memory" "Mémoire Vivante"	TBA
Malo and his crew agree to take Roberta, whose vast memory conceals the Tracers' map, to Xanthos^{[*]}, the capital of the League, where she intends to take a short holiday. Meanwhile, on Krill-Fireng, a Psionic Devourer (a creature which steals people's memories) escapes from the laboratories where it was created, and stows-away on a ship bound for Xanthos. Once free on the planet, the Devourer attacks Roberta and steals her memory. Malo attempts to retrieve it.^{*} Xanthos was a major city of the Lycian League (168 BC – 4th century AD).
8	"Pacem" "Pacem"	TBA
After decades of peace, the shadow of war again hangs over the Cosmocratic League, with tensions rising between the solar systems Laesri and Olnesa. It is only a matter of hours before the first battle starts. Taking part in the evacuation of civilians, the crew of Starduke discover that this new war is a phantom conflict, manufactured by Yago Carcharias to make more profits for the Krill-Fireng Consortium.
9	"Xox" "X0x"	TBA
The Starduke receives a distress call from the space station Azer 551^{[*]}. When they arrive, Malo and his crew discover that the station has been seriously damaged in an attack by pirates. Exploring the deserted station, they find in the debris a small creature by the name of Xox, which they bring back aboard the Starduke. Malo, Cyana and Jonas quickly observe that Xox is not at all the inoffensive creature which it first appeared to be.^{*} An Azer is a dwarf-like character in Dungeons & Dragons.
10	"Fahrenheit" "Fahrenheit"	TBA
Malo is hired to rescue two explorers on EM 451^{[*]}, a newly discovered planet with a high surface temperature. Malo notices that some "fireflies" have come aboard the Starduke. Gradually, the insects spread to other ships the Starduke meets. Unless Malo can come up with a plan to stop them, they will destroy the Starduke and many other Tracer ships.^{*} Fahrenheit 451 is the title of a well known Ray Bradbury novel in which “firemen” are employed to burn books.
11	"There be Monsters Here" "Les Monstres ne sont pas Ceux qu'on Croit"	TBA
The administrator of a gas planet claims the "sky whales", which live in the planet's atmosphere, are a deadly menace to the population. Malo discovers that Yago Carcharias has invented the threat with the aim of increasing the Consortium's grip on the League.
12	"Rescue" "Sauvetage"	TBA
Malo tries to help Vance, an unscrupulous Tracer whose ship is stuck in a nebula. He discovers that the ship's illegal and unstable cargo is likely to explode and destroy all the nearby planets.
13	"The Gift" "Un Étrange Cadeau"	TBA
On a planet populated by giants, an evil advisor has been plotting to steal a kingdom from its young king. As part of the plot, Malo is asked to deliver a gift to the king. But, he is amazed to discover that the gift is in fact the Starduke and the crew, a simple "toy" which the king demanded before dying.
14	"Time Trap" "Piège en Boucle"	TBA
Malo is on a routine mission to transport a scientist. But the peaceful journey becomes a nightmare when Malo discovers that the scientist is in possession of a machine capable of altering the course of time.
15	"Distant Encounter" "Rencontre Lointaine"	TBA
The Starduke is travelling near the edge of an immense black hole when it is suddenly attacked by pirates. Both ships find themselves trapped in the black hole's gravity well. To be able to escape, Malo and the pirate captain must work together.
16	"The Black Sun" "Soleil Noir"	TBA
The star of the Sol Morituri^{[*]} system is in danger of dying, and with it all the planets in the system. The people of Kelvin ask for assistance from the League, which decides to provide them with the Black Sun, a device capable of revitalizing a star. Malo is charged with this urgent mission to transport the Black Sun to the Sol Morituri system, despite interference from Yago Carcharias.^{*} "Morituri" is the plural of a Latin word meaning "about to die".
17	"Follow Your Dream" "Poursuivez vos Rêves"	TBA
A new bill to outlaw the Tracers is before the parliament on Xanthos. In an attempt to discredit the Tracers, the Consortium sets a trap for Cyana by inviting her aboard a Tracer registered ship programmed to crash. Malo and friends must save her from this dastardly plot.
18	"The Evil Spirit" "Mauvais Esprit"	TBA
The Consortium insert a computer into Malo's body and it takes over his mind with nobody realizing it. The goal is simple: to use Malo take the control of Cosmocratic League.
19	"Alison Bracket" "Alison Bracket"	TBA
The Starduke narrowly avoids a collision with a ship, whose pilot turns out to be a cosmonaut from the end of the 21st century. Malo decides to help her to return to her own time. But to do that, Malo will have to avoid the attention of Yago Carcharias, for whom the control of a space-time rift would be a formidable weapon.
20	"Forsaken" "Ce que tu Abandonnes"	TBA
Just as the Starduke enters the Janus^{[*]} system, Malo is irradiated by the flare of a binary star. He disintegrates in a multitude of bubbles which scatter in the weightlessness of the cockpit. A perilous situation in which Jonas and Cyana must act quickly.^{*} Janus was the two-faced Roman god of gates, doors, beginnings, and endings.
21	"Outlaw" "Hors-la-loi"	TBA
Malo and his companions are stopped by Starpol and are charged with unfair competition against the Consortium. The lawsuit is rich with new developments until the moment when Malo confesses.
22	"Reunion" "Réunion"	TBA
Malo has convened a meeting of the Tracers, the first since his father disappeared, many years ago. Unfortunately Yago Carcharias infiltrates the meeting with the intention of destroying the unity and the friendship of the Tracers, and hopefully making them easier to eliminate.
23	"Roll Over Mac Murphy" "Roll Over McMurphy"	TBA
Jonas is devastated to learn that McMurphy, a legendary rock'n'roll performer, has died after his ship was shot down by the inhabitants of Tonnerres. Unconvinced, Malo decides to investigate and discovers that the Tonnerres are innocent. McMurphy is in fact alive and the news was only propaganda created by the Consortium.
24	"Just Milliseconds Away" "Mille Millièmes de Secondes"	TBA
Broke and under threat of bankruptcy, Malo accepts a tidy sum from a mysterious young woman to transport her to a remote planet. She falls in love with Malo, but becomes violent when she realises that he is not in love with her.
25	"A Question of Trust" "Question de Confiance"	TBA
The Consortium can only be prevented from obtaining a monopoly on a new vortex star route if Malo can prove that Tracer starships can also use the route safely.
26	"Mouandibi" "Mouandibi"	TBA
The Starduke is forced to land on the planet Djavel Barg to pick up a corrupt diplomat, who is to be charged with fraudulent dealings with the Consortium. The landing awakens the last two survivors of the planet, who see in the prisoner as the reincarnation of King Mouandibi, the master criminal who was responsible for their planet's misfortune.
