= Lola Cordova =

French graphic novel

Publication information
- Publisher: Casterman
- Format: One-shot
- Publication date: April 2006
- No. of issues: 1
- Main character: Lola Cordova

Creative team
- Written by: Arthur Qwak
- Artist: Arthur Qwak

Lola Cordova is a single-issue French graphic novel, written and drawn by Arthur Qwak, and published in April 2005. The extremely non-linear story tells the adventures of a prostitute who is kidnapped by aliens who wish to destroy the world.

It was republished in the march 08 issue of Heavy Metal (magazine).
