= Crafty Kids Club =

2010s French animated television series

Crafty Kids Club (French: Brico Club) is a French television series produced by Futurikon. The term "Brico" is a shortening of "bricolage", meaning to construct things from what is available - relating to the main characters' main intent for their club.

The series focuses on the everyday lives of a group of four children - Matt, Clara, Li-Mei and Ben - who are skilled in handcrafted creations out of recycled material. They prefer to create any new ideas collaboratively and mainly use their expertise, in order to solve various problems of the other townsfolk.

== Broadcast ==
The French version aired in Europe on France 5's Zouzous programming block since 2013, and in Canada on Unis since 2016.

The English version aired in The Philippines on Discovery Kids in 2013.

The Spanish version aired in Mexico canal 22 conaculta since 2014-2017.

The Vietnamese version aired in VTV2, ANT - BPTV3, An Viên - BTV9, SAM - BTV11 and VTVCab 8 - Bibi with the name "Câu lạc bộ sáng tạo".

== Characters ==
There are four main friends in the club:

- Ben (Benjamin, nicknamed Benny)
- Clara (nicknamed Clarinet)
- Matt (called Driss in the original)
- Li-Mei (nicknamed Li)

Others include:

- Max, a pet cat
- Madame Mnouchka
- Mademoiselle bus driver
- Robinson
- John

== Production ==
It is produced by Philippe DeLarue and directed by David Pascal. Writers include Nathalie Dargent. The series uses puppet animation.

== Episodes ==
There are 52 episodes each 12 minutes long. Titles include:

- 48. Chapeau nid d'oiseau (bird's nest hat)
- 49. La petite souris (The little mouse)
- 50. Caribou sans le sou (Caribou penniless)
- 51. Les araignées de l'espace (Spiders Space)
- 52. Un Charme Flou (A Fuzzy Charm)
