= GA&A Productions =

GA&A Productions S.r.l.
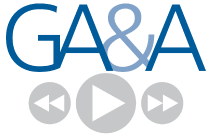
- Company type: Limited Liability Company
- Industry: Entertainment
- Founded: 1990; 36 years ago
- Founder: Gioia Avvantaggiato
- Headquarters: Rome, Italy
- Area served: Worldwide
- Key people: Gioia Avvantaggiato, president and executive producer
- Products: Films; Television; Factual; Documentary
- Website: gaea.it

GA&A Productions S.r.l. is an Italian distribution and production film company founded in 1990 by Gioia Avantaggiato, which operates in cinema and television. During its business, GA&A Productions collaborated with leading Italian television networks, from RAI to Mediaset to La7. The company, which works in the field of cinema, documentary and television shows, also acts on the international stage and has co-produced documentaries with channels such as Arte, Channel 4, ZDF, CBC, National Geographic, Discovery Channel, NHK Japan and SBS Australia. The company is also involved in film distribution. Among its catalogue:

- Burma VJ, Oscar-winning candidate (2010)
- When You’re Strange – A Film About The Doors (2010)
- Marina Abramović – The Artist is Present (2012), winner of the Panorama Audience Award for Best Documentary at the 2012 Berlin International Film Festival
- Last Men in Aleppo (2016)

== Filmography ==
- La Storia, the scandal novel, Produced by GA&A Productions and Luce Cinecittà, in coproduction with ARTE GEIE, in association with Rai Cultura (2024)
- 'O Museo, in collaboration with Rai Cultura (2024)
- Putin’s shadow on Africa – the Central African Republic model (2024)
- Banksy and the stolen girl, produced by GA&A Productions and Tinkerland, in coproduction with ARTE GEIE, RAI Cultura and Luce Cinecittà, in collaboration with RAI Teche and in association with RTS and RTBF (2023)
- Art Rider season 3, in collaboration with Rai Cultura (2022)
- Dictators' Nightmare, in association with RTS, Histoire/TF1 and VIASAT (2022)
- Urbino: The Ideal City Of The Renaissance, in collaboration with RAI Cultura (2022)
- Dante's Divine Politics, a GA&A Productions/ARTLINE production, in coproduction with RAI Documentari and ARTE Geie (2021)
- Libya: Gaddafi’s Bloody Legacy, in coproduction with Gruppe5 and ZDF and in association with Arte, RAI Documentari, RTS, SVT, NRK (2021)
- Susanna Tamaro, Unplugged, in collaboration with RAI Cultura (2021)
- Art Rider season 2, in collaboration with Rai Cultura (2021)
- Baia, the Atlantis of Rome, in coproduction with Filmare, in collaboration with RAI Cultura (2021)
- The Mystery of the Trojan Horse - On the Trail of a Myth, in coproduction with Gruppe 5, in association with ARTE and ZDF Enterprises (2021)
- Yemen, despite the war, in collaboration with RAI3, ZDF.info and AL JAZEERA Arabic (2021)
- Black Samurai, in collaboration with RAI3 and SRC (2020)
- Art Rider, in collaboration with Rai Cultura (2020)
- Venezuela, the curse of oil (2019), in coproduction with Gruppe 5 / ZDF, in association with ARTE, TSR, NRK and SVT
- Io sono Sofia (2019), produced for Rai 3
- WorkTrotter, (2018), reality series in coproduction with Rai 4
- Our Man In Cairo (2018), in coproduction with Gruppe 5 / ZDF in association with Arte
- Fascio e Compasso (2018), in association with Rai 3
- Young Midwives (2017), in coproduction with Digicast
- Hidden Gems of Italy (2017), in coproduction with Digicast
- Behind The Altar (2017), in coproduction with ZDF/Arte and EO IkonDocs, in association with SVT, Yle, NRK, VRT, RTS, RSI, SRC
- Leonardo: the Man Who Saved Science (2017), in coproduction with THIRTEEN Pro-ductions LLC for WNET, France 5/Pro-gramme 33 and SBS Australia
- Passeggiate romane (2016), in association with Rai Cinema and in collaboration with RAI Teche. Produced with the support of MIBACT – Direzione Cinema
- Eating history – The Story of Italy on a Plate (2016), in association with A&E Networks Italy, SBS-TV, Autentic GmbH and Viasat
- Angeli (2015), produced for RTI S.p.a.
- Sicily Jass – The World's First Man in Jazz (2015), in coproduction with MRF5, in association with Rai Cinema, in collaboration with LAZY FILM. Produced with the support of MIBACT – Direzione Cinema and Regione Sicilia
- The Cross & The Gun (2015), in association with ZDF/Arte, in collaboration with AETN, CBC, SRC, SVT, DR, NRK, RTS, VRT
- Holy Money (2014), in coproduction with ZDF/Arte and Al Jazeera America, in association with CBC, CBC-SRC, RTS, VRT, NRK, SVT, DR
- We Were Gladio (2014), in coproduction with LCP (France), RTBF/Les Films de la Passerelle. Produced with the support of the MEDIA Programme of the European Union
- The troublemaker – Behind the Scenes of United Nations (2014), in collaboration with SIRK Productions
- Just a Shot (2013), in collaboration with RAI La storia siamo noi
- Le battaglie dei giganti (2013), produced for Fox Channel/History Italia
- Benedict's Via Dolorosa (2013), in co-production with La7
- The Pope & I (2013), in coproduction with ZDF, in collaboration with Arte
- Opening Act (2013), in coproduction with ESTER Produzioni. In competition at Torino Film Festival 2013
- My Travels With Cecilia (2013), in association with RAI Cinema and ElephantFilm. Produced with the support of MIBACT, ApuliaFilm Commission and Cineteca di Bologna
- Magnifico mondo (2012), in association with Reti Televisive Italiane S.p.a.
- Nome in codice Gladio (2012), in collaboration with RAI La storia siamo noi
- Malaria. Hitler's Secret Weapon (2012), in collaboration with RAI, produced with the support of the MEDIA Programme of the European Union
- Last Chance Teachers (2011), in association with Lichtpunt
- La strage di Natale (2011), produced for RAI La Storia siamo noi
- Una vita per i campesinos (2011), in collaboration with Rai3, Geo&Geo
- Infanzia incarcerata (2011), in collaboration with Rai3, Geo&Geo
- Disasters Chronicles (2011), in association with Reti Televisive Italiane S.p.a.
- Ferrhotel (2011), in collaboration with Consiglio regionale della Puglia, Winner of the UCCA Award – 29° Film Festival
- Homeless United (2010), in coproduction with Ruvido Produzioni
- The Twin Attacks (2009), in association with RAI Educational and Fox International Channels
- Tamil, indiani a Palermo (2009), produced for Rai3, Geo&Geo
- Antonio, maestro falconiere (2009) produced for Rai3, Geo&Geo
- My Life with Volcanoes (2009), in collaboration with Rai3, Geo&Geo
- Comic Books go to War (2009), in coproduction with ZDF/Arte and AVRO. In collaboration with SVT, Yle, RTS, RTBF, VRT, SF, SBS, ORF. Produced with the support of the MEDIA Programme of the European Union and produced with the support of the Media TV Broadcasting
- Journey to the Giant Crystal Cave (2008), in coproduction with TelFrance, Arte, NHK, in association with RTBF and La7
- Naica, Secrets of the Giant Crystal Cave (2008), in coproduction with C/Producciones, TelFrance, Discovery Canada, National Geographic Channel, Arte France, La7, NHK and Discovery Latin America
- Mussolini's Dirty War (2008), in coproduction with ERT, in association with RT, History Channel Italy, RSI, Histoire. Produced with the support of the MEDIA Programme of the European Union
- Gnam! (2007), in coproduction with Rai3
- Yamana, Nomads of the Fire (2007) in association with Rai 3 and MT Channel
- ABC Colombia (2007), in coproduction with Les Films d'Ici/Arte France and ITVS, in association with Channel 4, Yle. Produced with the support of the MEDIA Programme of the European Union
- Volcano Hunt (2006), in coproduction with Per Diem Films, Arte, RTI and in association with SBS, RTBF, Planète. Produced with the support of MEDIA TV Broadcasting
- Il Trasloco del Bar di Vezio (2005), in coproduction with Planet Italia
- Carvilius, a Riddle from the Past (2005), produced for Discovery US, in association with SBS – TV Australia
- Viminale – Mussolini's last Ship (2004), produced with the support of the MEDIA Programme of the European Union
- Old Elephant Route (2001), in coproduction with Les Films d'ici, Animal Planet – in association with Aane Mane Foundation and Telepiù
- The Train to the Opera (2000)
- Soul & Soil (2000)
