= Kurtz & Friends =

American animation studio

- Company type: Private
- Industry: Animation
- Founders: Bob Kurtz
- Headquarters: Hollywood, California, U.S.
- Key people: Bob Kurtz (President)
- Website: kurtzanim.wordpress.com

Kurtz & Friends is an American animation studio founded by Bob Kurtz. Based in Burbank, California, the studio is known for producing short films, title sequences, and television commercials.

Kurtz & Friends has created/produced animated theatrical titles for most major studios including the Walt Disney Company, Universal Studios, MGM, Sony Entertainment, Columbia TriStar Motion Picture Group and Warner Bros. Titles include: The Pink Panther, Are We Done Yet?, Four Rooms, George of the Jungle and City Slickers.

The company also created animated sequences for Jurassic Park and Minority Report, as well as for HBO's Carlin on Campus. In addition, Kurtz & Friends developed The Way Things Work, a three-screen, 3-D multimedia film for Sony's San Francisco Metreon complex, and the "Crocodile" anti-smoking films and print campaign for the California Department of Public Health.

Kurtz & Friends created the animation for the Emmy-winning specials David Macaulay: Roman City and Edith Ann's Christmas (Just Say Noël) which won a Peabody Award. The company's films are included in the permanent collections of the Museum of Modern Art, New York, the Los Angeles County Museum of Art, and the ASIFA Archive in Germany.

== Filmography ==
Title	Year(s)	Notes	Client
Sesame Street	1970–71; 1975	animated sequences in "43", "85", "294", "303", "769", "772", "784" (produced at FilmFair)	Children's Television Workshop
A Midsummer Night's Sex Comedy	1982	title sequence	Orion Pictures
Max Dugan Returns	1983	title animation	20th Century Fox
One to Grow On	1983	opening and closing animation	NBC
Carlin on Campus	1984	'Drawing on My Mind' animated sequences	Carlin Productions
Harold and His Amazing Green Plants	1984		EPCOT Educational Media
TGIF	1989	animation	ABC
Jetsons: The Movie	1990	"You and Me"	Universal Pictures
Taking Care of Business	1990	title sequence	Hollywood Pictures
City Slickers	1991	title sequence	Castle Rock Entertainment
Straight Talk	1992	title sequence	Hollywood Pictures
Honey, I Blew Up the Kid	1992	title sequence	Walt Disney Pictures
Honeymoon in Vegas	1992	title sequence	Castle Rock Entertainment
Jurassic Park	1993	Mr. DNA sequence	Universal Pictures
City Slickers II: The Legend of Curly's Gold	1994	title sequence	Castle Rock Entertainment
David Macaulay: Roman City	1994		Unicorn Projects
Casper	1995	teaser trailer	Universal Pictures
Four Rooms	1995	title sequence	Miramax
Kingpin	1996	title sequence	Rysher Entertainment
A Very Brady Sequel	1996	animation	Paramount Pictures
Edith Ann's Christmas (Just Say Noël)	1996	Television special created by Lilly Tomlin	Tomlin and Wagner Theatricalz
George of the Jungle	1997	title sequence	Walt Disney Pictures
Durango	1999	animation	Hallmark Hall of Fame
The Way Things Work – In Mammoth 3D	1999		Sony Metreon
God, the Devil and Bob	2000	additional character design	The Carsey-Werner Company
Major Flake	2000		Cartoon Network
Josie and the Pussycats	2001	animated sequence	Universal Pictures; Metro-Goldwyn-Mayer
Family Guy	2001	"A Very Special Family Guy Freakin' Christmas" (storyboards and animatic editing)	Fox Television Animation
Minority Report	2002	Pine & Oats animation	DreamWorks Pictures; Amblin Entertainment
Scooby-Doo	2002	unused animated opening titles	Warner Bros.
Ask Rita	2003	opening titles	Litton Entertainment
Son of the Mask	2005	digital paint	New Line Cinema
The Pink Panther	2006	title sequence	Columbia Pictures; Metro-Goldwyn-Mayer
Are We Done Yet?	2007	title sequence	Revolution Studios
Schoolhouse Rock! Earth	2009	"A Tiny Urban Zoo" and interstitials	ABC
Gambit	2012	title sequence	FilmNation Entertainment

Commercials

- Acura Integra (1994)
- AirTouch Cellular
- Alpha-Bits
- Anchorage Convention and Visitors Bureau (1981)
- Brown & Polson (1980s)
- Bullwinkle's Vitamin Soda Pop (1992)
- Burger King (2002)
- Cadillac Catera
- California Department of Public Health (1984, 1990, 2000, 2011, 2013)
- CenTrust Bank (1980s)
- Chef Jr. (1997)
- Chevron (1977)
- Coca-Cola Europe (2002)
- Comcast (1999)
- Cold Turkey (1996)
- Crunchi-O's (1970s)
- Drug Emporium (1990s)
- Einstein Bros. Bagels
- Energizer (2001)
- Fingos (1993)
- First Interstate Bank (1987)
- FOX (station ID; 1990s)
- Gallo (1980s)
- The Gas Company (1980s)
- Group W (1970s)
- Happy Carob (1970s)
- Honda UK (2005)
- Honey Smacks
- I Wink Lashes
- Idaho Potato Commission (2000s)
- In Step (1970s)
- Juicy Fruit (1990s)
- Junior (1996)
- Just Pants (1970s)
- Kemps (2001)
- Ken-L Ration (1980s)
- Kirin Company
- Kitty Salmon (1970s)
- Klondike (1980s)
- Knudsen (1970s)
- Kraft Singles (1992)
- Kroger (1980s)
- Laura Scudder Inc. (1986)
- Levi's (1974, 1978)
- Lincoln Park Zoo (1987)
- Lincoln Savings and Loan Association (1980s)
- Lipton (1970s)
- Log Cabin syrup (1970s)
- Louisiana Lottery (1990s)
- Mazda (1995)
- McDonald's (1984)
- Moore Syndication (1984, 2013)
- MultiGroup Health Plan (1980s)
- NBC Online
- Nesbitt's
- New Hampshire Office of Travel & Tourism Development (1980s)
- Parco (1990s)
- Rolling Thunder (1995)
- Raid (1990s)
- Sparkletts (1970s)
- Sunbeam Products (1973)
- Taco Bell (1990s)
- Toshiba (2011)
- United States Forest Service (1972, 1995)
- United States Postal Service (1990)
- Van de Kamp's (1970s)
- Wild World Films
