= Tuesday (book) =

1991 picture book by David Wiesner

- David Wiesner
- Author: David Wiesner
- Illustrator: David Wiesner
- Cover artist: David Wiesner
- Genre: Children's picture book
- Publisher: Clarion Books
- Publication date: 1991
- Publication place: United States
- ISBN: 978-0-395-55113-4
- OCLC: 21970322
- Dewey Decimal: [E] 20
- LC Class: PZ7.W6367 Tu 1991

Tuesday, written and illustrated by David Wiesner, is a 1991 wordless picture book published by Clarion Books. Tuesday received the 1992 Caldecott Medal for illustrations and was Wiesner's first of three Caldecott Medals that he has won during his career. Wiesner subsequently won the Caldecott Medal in 2002 for The Three Pigs, and the 2007 medal for Flotsam.

== Description ==
Tuesday is an almost wordless picture book for children, written and illustrated by American author David Wiesner. The book was originally published in 1991 by Clarion Books, and then re-published in 2001 by Houghton Mifflin Harcourt Books for Young Readers. The book contains 35 pages and is designed for children ages 3 and up. Tuesday is dedicated to Tom Sgouros.

== Plot ==
The story contains only six words and three points that determine the time of the action. The whole story is narrated by colorful pictures of frogs flying on their lily pads.

The story begins on "Tuesday evening, around eight".

A group of frogs start their journey in some wetlands, then fly to the nearest town. They levitate past birds that sit on the electric wires, pausing at the kitchen window of a man eating his sandwich. The frogs pass through someone's backyard. They enter the house where an old lady sleeps in front of her television. The squadron of frogs appropriate her remote control and stare avidly at the screen. At "4:38 a.m.", they encounter a dog who tries to catch one of the frogs, but is then chased by a large group of them. At dawn, the frogs return to the pond and their normal life of resting on lily pads and swimming. Back in the city, people investigate traces left by the frogs.

The final pages of the book show "next Tuesday" around eight in the evening, with pigs hovering above the roof of a farm building.

== Critical reception ==
The School Library Monthly declares that Tuesday has "spellbinding effect on first-time readers that they may wish to join in the adventure".

The New York Times highlights that Tuesday "allows readers to concoct their own story lines", while Publishers Weekly calls the book "stunning: slightly surrealistic, imbued with mood and mystery". Mary Lou White, from the Caldecott Award Selection Committee chair, summarizes Wiesner's work as a "masterful use of light and dark, alternating perspectives, and variation in page design". Kirkus Reviews claimed that Wiesner "provides plenty of intriguing visual details to ponder".

== Awards ==
- Caldecott Medal (1992)
- Japan Picture Book Award (1992)

== Adaptations ==
In 1992, Tuesday was adapted into a short animated film by Doros Evangelides and Rosemary Killen.

In 2002 Tuesday was used for the production of an animated movie which belongs to the anthology film Paul McCartney: Music & Animation. The director of the enterprise was Geoff Dunbar, with the production tasks carried out by Paul McCartney. In the movie voices were provided by Paul McCartney, his wife Linda, Dustin Hoffman, June Whitfield, and Windsor Davies. The short was dedicated to Linda McCartney, who died before the short's completion. For the animation of Wiesner's book, Dunbar and Judith Roberts were nominated for a British Academy Award.

== Notes ==
Awards
Preceded by Black and White	Caldecott Medal recipient 1992	Succeeded by Mirette on the High Wire
