= Postmodern picture book =

Postmodern picture books are a specific genre of picture books. Characteristics of this unique type of book include non-linear narrative forms in storybooks, books that are "aware" of themselves as books and include self-referential elements, and what is known as metafiction.

A classic example of this genre is David Macaulay's award-winning Black and White (1990). This book consists of four "separate" sub-plots which are related, but the reader must decide in what way the story becomes meaningful. The inside front cover of this book, awarded the Caldecott Medal in 1990, states: "WARNING: This book appears to contain a number of stories that do not necessarily occur at the same time. But it may contain only one story. Then again, there may be four stories. Or four parts of a story. Careful inspection of both words and pictures is recommended."

Examples of postmodern picture books include David Wiesner's The Three Pigs, Anthony Browne's Voices in the Park, and Jon Scieszka and Lane Smith's The Stinky Cheese Man. Some books have unusual pictures that don't always mesh with the traditional, linear text (that often matches the pictures). An example would be Bamboozled by David Legge.

Frank Serafini (2004) has created lesson plans that lead students to discuss how text interacts with illustrations. Three sets of texts could be discussed: books that have corresponding text and pictures, books where the illustrations enhance the texts, and books where the illustrations contradict the text (Bamboozled is an example of contradictory text). Another lesson that Serafini describes that incorporates PM picture books could be having students read books that are ambiguous and allow for multiple interpretations. Student are encouraged to record their thinking in a journal called a "walking notebook". Books that are especially open to interpretation include: Browne's Voices in the Park, Wiesner's The Three Pigs, and David Macauley's Black and White.

These books could be thought of as multi-modal texts that defy the usual, linear organization of storybooks. In postmodern, meta-fictive books, the reader is intentionally made aware of the way that the book calls attention to itself. For example, in Wiesner's The Three Pigs, the main characters decide to climb outside the text; pictures depicting the pigs climbing outside the story are prominent. In The Stinky Cheese Man, Scieszka and Lane purposely use intertextual references, or references to many other well-known fables, to create tongue-in-cheek, satirical stories and spin-offs of classic fairy tales. Widely varying size fonts and pictures combine to create a post-modern picture book.

According to Anstey (2002), characteristics of postmodern picture books include:

1. Non-traditional plot structure
2. Using the pictures or text to position the reader to read the text in a particular way, for example, through a character's eyes or point of view.
3. The reader's involvement with constructing the meaning of the text.
4. Intertextual references, which requires the reader to make connections to other books or knowledge, in order to better understand the text.
5. Varied design layout and a variety of styles of illustration.

Ryan & Anstey (2003) suggest that post-modern picture books may allow students to increase their "self-knowledge about reading" and that students might be able to use this knowledge in strategic ways as they read. In their study, Ryan and Anstey looked at how sixth graders responded to a PM picture book, which was selected because it was open to many interpretations, titled The Rabbits by John Marsden and Shaun Tan. They discovered that the reading of such texts allow students to draw upon their resources as readers. The reading of such books supports a multiliteracies perspective. Accordingly, such books may be useful in allowing teachers to use texts that encourage students to draw upon their own identity and use this knowledge to read strategically.
