= Cro (TV series) =

- Based on: The Way Things Work by David Macaulay
- Developed by: Mark Zaslove
- Written by: Libby Hinson; Sindy McKay; Dev Ross; Marianne Sellek; Mark Zaslove
- Directed by: Anne Luiting
- Starring: Max Casella as the voice of Cro
- Voices of: Charlie Adler; Ruth Buzzi; Jim Cummings; Tress MacNeille; Candi Milo; Laurie O'Brien; April Ortiz; Jane Singer; Jussie Smollett; Frank Welker
- Composer: Stacy Widelitz
- Country of origin: United States
- Original language: English
- No. of seasons: 2
- No. of episodes: 21 (list of episodes)

Production
- Executive producers: Phil Roman; Jeffrey Nelson; Franklin Getchell; Marjorie Kalins; Joan Ganz Cooney; Mark Zaslove
- Producers: Catherine Mullally; Bob Richardson
- Running time: approx. 23 mins
- Production companies: Children's Television Workshop; Film Roman

Original release
- Network: ABC
- Release: September 18, 1993 – December 3, 1994

Cro is an American animated television series produced by the Children's Television Workshop (now known as Sesame Workshop) and Film Roman. It was partially funded by the National Science Foundation. Every episode has an educational theme, introducing basic concepts of physics, mechanical engineering, and technology. The show's narrator is an orange woolly mammoth named Phil who was found frozen in ice by a scientist named Dr. C and her assistant Mike. After they defrost him, Phil tells both of them about life in the Ice Age, including stories about his friend Cro, a Cro-Magnon boy.

The show debuted on September 18, 1993, on ABC. ABC canceled the series in 1994, which caused the Children's Television Workshop to plan its own TV channel so that it would not have to rely on other companies to air its shows. The new channel, Noggin, debuted in 1999 and aired Cro reruns from its launch date until 2004. From 2000 to 2002, Cro also aired on Nickelodeon during the "Noggin on Nick" block.

The series' story editors were Sindy McKay and Mark Zaslove, who was also the developer of the show. The premise of using woolly mammoths as a teaching tool for the principles of technology was inspired by The Way Things Work, a book by David Macaulay. Cro was created with the help of a developmental psychologist, Dr. Susan Mendelsohn, and its educational content was heavily researched. According to the Children's Television Workshop, testing of over 2,600 viewers aged 6–12 found that they were absorbing basic science concepts through the show.

== Premise ==
A scientist named Dr. C and her assistant Mike travel to the Arctic to study artifacts and find a frozen woolly mammoth named Phil. They thaw him out and are surprised to find that he can speak. Whenever a situation in modern times involves physics principles, Phil remembers when a similar event occurred long ago in the prehistoric valley of Woollyville with his fellow mammoths and his Cro-Magnon friend Cro who lived with a family of Neanderthals. Each episode features Phil narrating how a problem was resolved through simple engineering.

The show's (and lead character's) name is an Occitan word for "cave"; it alludes to Cro-Magnon, the location in France where the earliest anatomically modern humans were first discovered.

== Characters ==
=== Cavepeople ===
- Cro (voiced by Max Casella) is an 11-year-old Cro-Magnon boy who was adopted by a tribe of Neanderthals. He is a somewhat scrawny and yet still rather muscular young Cro-Magnon boy with long, shaggy, red hair and wears a yellow armband on one arm. Most of the Neanderthals that he lives with are jealous of his intelligence. Unlike the rest of the tribe, Cro speaks in complete sentences.
- Nandy (voiced by Ruth Buzzi) is the matriarch of the Neanderthal tribe who is noted for her urban legends. Some of her legends include the legend of "Big Thing" and a monster called "Big Skinny Thing with Many, Many Legs." Nandy gets into arguments with Ogg and usually wins as she is fully aware of Ogg's own fears. Nandy is very overprotective of Cro and motherly around everyone else.
- Ogg (voiced by Jim Cummings) is the selfish, bossy leader of Cro's adoptive Neanderthal tribe. He is difficult to get along with, but easily frightened by danger.
- Gogg (voiced by Frank Welker) is a tall, but sensitive Neanderthal who sticks up for Bobb and mostly translates for him, even though Nandy and Ogg do occasionally.
- Bobb (vocal effects provided by Frank Welker) is another adopted member of the Neanderthal tribe and the least evolved of the tribe, resembling a homo habilis. He does not speak like the rest of the Neanderthals, but makes primate-like noises which Gogg usually translates. When Bobb was younger, he was in a different tribe made up of similar homo habilis. The tribe took a nap and Bobb woke up to find the whole tribe had vanished without a trace, creating a fear of loneliness until the Neanderthals found him.
- Sooli (voiced by Cree Summer) is another Cro-Magnon who got separated from her tribe and Cro and Pakka help her find her favorite horse. Sooli only appeared in the episode "The Legend of Big Thing".

=== Woolly mammoths ===
- Ivanna (voiced by Laurie O'Brien) is a southern belle woolly mammoth with yellow fur and brown skin with a mole who is Phil's love interest. She is the second oldest female mammoth in Phil's herd next to Esmeralda. She usually uses Phil for her experiments.
- Pakka (voiced by Candi Milo) is a young woolly mammoth with light orange fur and yellow skin and a close friend of Cro's. She and Cro meet after Cro confronts Selene the Smilodon. She is the third oldest female mammoth next to Ivanna and Esmeralda. She sometimes tells Cro interesting facts about mammoths.
- Steamer (voiced by Charlie Adler) is the youngest woolly mammoth in Phil's herd with maroon fur and light purple skin, whose hyperactivity and love of making mischief often land him in hot water.
- Esmeralda (voiced by Tress MacNeille) is the oldest female woolly mammoth and matriarch of Phil's herd with light yellow fur and gray skin. She makes sure that everything goes to order and that those who have wronged the mammoth society be punished. She has strongly mixed feelings about the presence of Cro's tribe in Woollyville.
- Earle (voiced by Frank Welker) is an elderly woolly mammoth with gray fur with dark gray-blue skin and a bald spot due to not having longer fur on his head. He hates humans and prefer traditions over new ways of life.
- Mojo (voiced by Charlie Adler) is a woolly mammoth who is Earle's younger brother with gray fur and light gray skin. Like Earle, Mojo hates humans and prefer traditions over new ways of life.

=== Modern-day characters ===
- Phil (voiced by Jim Cummings) is a smart but goofy woolly mammoth with orange and reddish fur who is kind to humans and mammoths alike. During the end of the Ice Age, Phil fell into a glacier while saving Cro from Selene and was thawed out by Mike and Dr. C 45,000 years later. He narrates stories of his life in Woollyville in every episode.
- Dr. Cecilia (voiced by April Ortiz) is an eccentric female scientist. She and Mike thawed out Phil, so he tells them his stories. Dr. C speaks with a distinct Hispanic accent and speaks a few Spanish words in some episodes. She bears a resemblance to Cro and may in fact be his descendant.
- Mike (voiced by Jussie Smollett) is a young friend of Dr. C who wears big glasses. He likes to play basketball and lives with Dr. C for reasons not specified. He and Dr. C were the two people that thawed out Phil and therefore, he tells them his stories.

=== Villains ===
- Big Red (voiced by Charlie Adler) is the conniving leader of a menacing pack of bumbling dire wolves. He uses threats to scare his minions into doing a good job. The dire wolves are one of two antagonists on the show as they would often try to eat Cro's tribe or the younger woolly mammoths.
  - Murray (voiced by Jim Cummings) is the minions of Big Red. Because he threatens them, the dire wolves fear Big Red. Murray thinks stupid things, which Big Red doesn't like, as shown in "Things That Eat Mung in the Night".
- Selene (voiced by Jane Singer) is a villainous, purple, yellow-eyed Smilodon. She first appears in "Lever in a Million Years" and has a monstrous appetite for anything that moves including the cavepeople. It was also revealed that Selene ate her mother when asked by Cro if she hated her mother. According to the show's opening theme song, she and Phil were fighting on a cliff and fell when part of the cliff gave way. She landed on a lower cliff while Phil fell into a glacier and was frozen in suspended animation for thousands of years.

== Episodes ==
According to Sesame Workshop's website, 21 episodes were made for the series.

=== Season 1 (1993) ===
No. overall	No. in season	Title	Directed by	Written by	Original release date
1	1	"Lever in a Million Years"	James West	Mark Zaslove	September 18, 1993
While stuck in the shower, Phil tells of when the neanderthals first moved into Woollyville.
2	2	"Pulley for You"	Milton Gray	Story by : Mark Zaslove; Teleplay by : Dev Ross	September 25, 1993
Phil gets stuck in the floor, so Dr. C and Mike make a pulley to lift him up, while Phil tells of the last time he saw a pulley.
3	3	"Meal Like a Pig"	Kyle James	Jeremy Cushner & Mark Zaslove	October 2, 1993
Dr. C and Mike try to avoid eating Phil's cooking. At the dinner table, Phil tells them about a time Cro went hunting.
4	4	"They Move Mammoths, Don't They?"	Swinton O. Scott III	Story by : Mark Zaslove & Bob Richardson; Teleplay by : Mark Zaslove	October 9, 1993
5	5	"What That Smell?"	Bob Nesler	Story by : Mark Zaslove; Teleplay by : Dev Ross & Jeremy Cushner	October 16, 1993
All of Woolyville is determined to bathe Og.
6	6	"A Bridge Too Short"	James West	Story by : Mark Zaslove & Jeremy Cushner; Teleplay by : Jeremy Cushner	October 23, 1993
Earl and Mojo have the humans build a bridge for the Grand Medallion of Merit.
7	7	"Things That Eat Mung in the Night"	Milton Gray	Story by : Mark Zaslove; Teleplay by : Sindy McKay	October 30, 1993
Phil wants to weigh himself, but he's way too big for a scale.
8	8	"Escape from Mung Island"	Kyle James	Story by : Mark Zaslove & Jeremy Cushner; Teleplay by : Sindy McKay	November 6, 1993
Nandy's mung drives Ogg to learn about boats and floating.
9	9	"Let Me Help"	Swinton O. Scott III	Story by : Mark Zaslove & Dev Ross; Teleplay by : Mark Zaslove	November 13, 1993
Phil goes a little overboard in his attempts to help the humans create a window in the cave.
10	10	"No Way Up"	Bob Nesler	Story by : Mark Zaslove & Jeremy Cushner; Teleplay by : Jeremy Cushner	November 20, 1993
Nandy has a final request, to fly.
11	11	"Adventures in Miscommunications"	Swinton O. Scott III	Story by : Jeremy Cushner & Mark Zaslove; Teleplay by : Mark Zaslove	November 27, 1993
Earl and Mojo's insult war gets mixed up with an important message about the volcano.
12	12	"Play It Again, Cro... NOT!"	Bob Nesler	Story by : Mark Zaslove; Teleplay by : Marianne Sellek and Sindy McKay	December 4, 1993
Cro practices his violin for the Woolyville marching band.
13	13	"Destroy All Buckies"	Swinton O. Scott III	Mark Zaslove & Jeremy Cushner	December 11, 1993
Ogg discovers a discarded invention and has to defend it as the rest of Woolyville demands its destruction.

=== Season 2 (1994) ===
No. overall	No. in season	Title	Directed by	Written by	Original release date
14	1	"Here's Lookin' at You, Cro!"	Dave Brain, Milt Gray, Tom Mazzocco	Sindy McKay	September 10, 1994
Cro discovers a 'seemyselfer' (a mirror) and uses it to watch Ogg and Gogg compete.
15	2	"It's Snow Problem"	Dave Brain, Milt Gray, Swinton O. Scott III	Rich Rogel & Mark Seidenberg	September 17, 1994
Cro invents a way to get everyone up the mountain to enjoy his new sport.
16	3	"Just a Stone's Throw Away"	Dave Brain, Milt Gray, Swinton O. Scott III, Tim Walker	Sindy McKay	September 24, 1994
After Bobb and Steamer trap themselves on the opposite side of a canyon, a few of Woolyville's residents band together to find an ingenious way to reach the other side to rescue them. Meanwhile, in the present, Phil helps Mike with his basketball skills with the aid of a catapult.
17	4	"Laugh, Mammoth, Laugh"	Unknown	Unknown	October 1, 1994
18	5	"Turn Up the Heat"	Milt Gray, Swinton O. Scott III, Tim Walker	Len Uhley	October 15, 1994
Cro needs to ride a mammoth for his coming of age ceremony. He hopes that making a new shower for Phil will get Phil to agree to help him.
19	6	"No Time for Steamer"	Anne Luiting, Swinton O. Scott III	Libby Hinson	October 22, 1994
Steamer is left behind as the other mammoths leave on vacation. Cro and the Neanderthals come up with a way to balance out everyone's time spent babysitting him.
20	7	"Pakka's Cool Invention"	Unknown	Dev Ross	October 22, 1994
Pakka helps find a way to keep Esmeralda cool in the summer heat.
21	8	"The Legend of Big Thing"	Juli Murphy Hashiguchi, Tom Mazzocco, Chuck Sheetz, Pat Shinagawa	Sindy McKay	December 3, 1994
On a camping trip, Phil tells a story about a creature called Big Thing.

== Broadcast ==
Cro debuted on September 18, 1993, on ABC. Even though the show received high ratings and drew the largest audience in its time slot, ABC cancelled the series after two seasons. The last episode premiered on December 3, 1994. In response to the cancellation, the Children's Television Workshop started planning its own TV channel where it could air Cro as well as other shows from its library. The CTW's senior Vice President, Gary Knell, said that "the lesson for us was that we can't rely entirely on other channels to put on programs which are educational as well as entertaining." The new channel was eventually named Noggin, and it launched as a joint venture with MTV Networks (the owners of Nickelodeon) in February 1999. Reruns of Cro were a mainstay on Noggin's schedule.

From 1999 until April 2002, Cro aired during the daytime on Noggin. From April 2002 until January 2004, the show only aired during Noggin's early-morning hours, during time slots reserved for Cable in the Classroom. Nickelodeon itself also aired Cro during a block called "Noggin on Nick" from 2000 to 2002.

== Home media ==
Three VHS tapes were released by Republic Pictures Home Video in the United States:

- Have Mammoths, Will Travel – Episodes: "No Way Up" and "Escape from Mung Island"
- Adventures in Woollyville – Episodes: "Pulley to You" and "A Bridge Too Short"
- It's a Woolly, Woolly World – Episodes: "Lever in a Million Years" and "Play It Again, Cro...NOT!"
