= Bob Kurtz =

Bob Kurtz may refer to:

- Bob Kurtz (sportscaster), American sportscaster for the Minnesota Wild (NHL)
- Bob Kurtz (animator), director, producer, artist and designer
