= Bob Kurtz (animator) =

American animator and film director

- Born: April 20, 1934 (age 92); United States
- Education: Chouinard Art Institute
- Occupations: Director, animator
- Board member of: ASIFA-Hollywood
- Spouse: Teresa Kurtz
- Awards: Winsor McCay Award, 1991; Primetime Emmy Award for Outstanding Animated Program, 1994; Peabody Award, 1996

Bob Kurtz (born April 20, 1934) is an American director, producer, artist, and designer who primarily works in films and TV commercials. He is the founder of Kurtz & Friends Animation. He attended the Chouinard Art Institute. He has taught at the character animation program at the California Institute of the Arts.

== Selected filmography ==
=== Director / writer / designer / producer ===
- Harold And His Amazing Green Plants (1984)

Feature films

- Max Dugan Returns (1983)
- Jetsons: The Movie (1990) (You & Me animation sequence)
- City Slickers (1991) (also for City Slickers II)
- Honey, I Blew Up The Kid (1992)
- Honeymoon in Vegas (1992)
- Straight Talk (1992)
- Jurassic Park (1993) ("Mr. DNA" animated sequences)
- City Slickers II (1994)
- Four Rooms (1995)
- George of the Jungle (1997)
- Minority Report (2002) ("Pine & Oats" animated sequence)
- The Pink Panther (2006)
- Are We Done Yet? (2007)
- Gambitt (2012)

Other

- The Way Things Work (3D-3 screen experience at Sony's Metreon)
- Chevron ("Dinosaur" commercial)
- Clubhouse (network ID's for German children's channel) (designer only)
- Junior (network ID's for German children's channel) (designer only)
- Sesame Street ("My Various Me's", "Lincoln Park Zoo", and "More Moths" animated sequences)
- Schoolhouse Rock! Earth ("Tiny Urban Zoo" scene)

TV

- The Roman City (1994 TV movie) (animated version of the David Macaulay book) (Best Primetime Animation Emmy)
- Edith Ann's Christmas: Just Say Noël (1996, TV movie) (Lily Tomlin special) (Peabody Award winner)
- Carlin on Campus (1984) ("Drawing on My Mind" animated sequences)

=== Awards ===
Winner of over 250 major awards including:

- Peabody Award
- Primetime Emmy Award for Outstanding Animated Program, 1994
- Winsor McCay Award for Lifetime Achievement, 1991
- Clio Awards
- International Festival of Short Films - Annecy, France
- U.S. Television & Film Festival - New York
- Ottawa/Hamilton Canadian International Animation Festival
- Chicago International Film Festival
- Society of Illustrators - New York
- London Television Advertising Awards
- Andy Awards
- Telly Awards
