= Castle (Macaulay book) =

1977 nonfiction book by David Macaulay

- First edition
- Author: David Macaulay
- Publisher: Houghton
- Publication date: 1977
- Pages: 79
- Awards: Caldecott Honor
- ISBN: 9780395257845
- OCLC: 475134945

Castle is a Caldecott Honor award-winning book written and illustrated by David Macaulay published in 1977. The book offers a detailed illustrated description of Aberwyvern castle, a fictional castle built between 1283 and 1288. Like many of Macaulay's other works, it consists of a written description of the construction process accompanied by pen-and-ink drawings. A great deal of detail is put into the descriptions, and he describes the workers and tools that would have been needed for the construction of a medieval castle.

== Plot ==
The castle is fictional, but the historical context is real. Macaulay places its construction in North West Wales between 1283 and 1288, when Edward I of England was in fact building a string of castles to help his conquest of that land, a long-term strategy which involved the English establishing an irremovable presence in Wales over generations until they are gradually accepted by the native population. Much of the layout and architecture of Aberwyvern castle is extrapolated from these Welsh castles, which Macaulay visited as a boy, and in particular Conwy Castle, which it is directly modelled after with the architect being James of Saint George, a real-life figure who designed many of the English castles in Wales.

The castle is constructed on a rocky mount jutting out into the River Wyvern. It is square in plan and has two concentric lines of fortification. The first line of defence is an outer curtain wall of 300 feet on the side, encircling the entire castle and forming the outer ward. The outer curtain wall of the castle also links with the defensive wall of the town. The tops of the wall are furnished battlements with merlons to protect defenders arrayed along the parapet walk. There are two gatehouses, one, defended by a drawbridge leading to the town, the other to a fortified dock (to allow the garrison to be supplied by ship in the event of a siege).

Within the outer ward, stands the inner ward, defended by a curtain wall with a large tower at each of its four corners and a massive gatehouse on the side facing the town. The walls of the inner ward are 12 feet thick and considerably taller than those of the outer ward, allowing the defenders to fire over the outer defences. The inner gatehouse protects the main entry, with a portcullis and a fortified corridor lined with arrow loops and murder holes and closed by huge doors at both ends.

The constructions within the inner ward of the castle include apartments, barracks, a forge, a kitchen and an impressive great hall.

Macaulay also details the architecture and other aspects of the construction of the walled town (also called Aberwyvern) next to the castle and explains how it supported the castle and vice versa. He explains its evolution over the centuries showing how, while the castle, at last obsolete with the acquiescence of the Welsh population to English domination, is eventually abandoned to become a ruin, the town itself lives on to become a prosperous and peaceful community.

== Reception ==
In a retrospective essay about the Caldecott Medal-winning books from 1976 to 1985, Barbara Bader wrote of Castle, "Timbered roof, thatched roof, and shingled roof each has its character, as each human figure, however minute, has a characterizing gesture, a characteristic stance. From raw beginnings to spectral end, virtuosity, sensitivity, and vision coalesce."

== In other media ==
The book was later adapted in a combined television documentary and animated dramatization in 1983 hosted by Macaulay himself and Sarah Bullen. The film was named to the ALA Notable Children's Videos list that year.

== Later editions ==
In 2010, Macaulay produced new versions of his books Cathedral and Castle. Macaulay reworked his original illustrations from scratch, which included adding color, changing many cross-sections to three-dimensional views, and updating information on historical details where available.
