= Sector 7 (book) =

1999 picture book by David Wiesner

- Cover
- Author: David Wiesner
- Illustrator: David Wiesner
- Genre: Picture book
- Publisher: Clarion Books
- Publication date: 1999
- ISBN: 978-0-395-74656-1
- OCLC: 36147202

Sector 7 is a wordless picture book created and illustrated by David Wiesner. Published in 1999 by Clarion Books, it was the recipient of the Caldecott Honor for illustration in 2000.

== Summary ==
The story is set at the Empire State Building's observatory, where a class of school children are on a field trip on a cloudy day. The primary character is a boy befriended by a friendly sentient cloud. The cloud flies the boy to Sector 7, an airborne depot for clouds. There the boy produces blueprints of fantastic new designs, in the form of ocean creatures, for the disgruntled clouds. As the clouds experiment, they delight in their new forms.

The human bureaucrats running the cloud depot are furious when they discover the clouds' misbehavior, and they escort the boy back to the observatory. Meanwhile, the clouds' rebelliousness spirals out of control. As the children return home on a school bus, the New York skyline becomes filled with a profusion of clouds in the shapes of aquarium fish and ocean creatures.

== Planned film adaptation ==
In May 2000, Nickelodeon won a bidding war against Pixar in acquiring the film rights to the novel Sector 7 with Darren Aronofsky attached to direct and Good Machine as co-producer. As of April 2019, the project remains in development hell.
