= Building Big =

Book written by David Macaulay

- Author: David Macaulay
- Language: English
- Publication date: 2000
- Publication place: United States

Building Big is a book written by David Macaulay, author of the book series The Way Things Work. Published in 2000, the book details the design of about 25 famous structures, broken down into five categories: Bridges, Tunnels, Dams, Domes, and Skyscrapers. The buildings cover construction from Roman times to the modern era.

PBS has created a television series based on the book.
