= European Network of Picturebook Research =

Picturebook research network

The European Network of Picturebook Research is a pioneering network of European-based scholars researching picture books from around the world.

The Network was founded in Barcelona in 2007, at the suggestion of Bettina Kümmerling-Meibauer. Its core group includes children's literature scholars Evelyn Arizpe, Teresa Colomer, Elina Druker, Bettina Kümmerling-Meibauer, Maria Nikolajeva, and Cecilia Silva-Díaz. Since 2007, it has held a biannual international conference.

Conference	Year	Location	Theme
1st	2007	Barcelona	New Impulses in Picturebook Research: Aesthetic and cognitive aspects of picturebooks
2nd	2009	Glasgow	Beyond Borders: Art, narrative and culture in picturebooks
3rd	2011	Tübingen	History and Theory of the Picturebook
4th	2013	Stockholm	Picturebooks as Meeting Places: Text, image, ideology
5th	2015	Gdansk	Picturebooks, Democracy and Social Change
6th	2017	Padova	Home and Lived-In Spaces in Picturebooks from the 1950s to the Present
7th	2019	Norway	Verbal and Visual Strategies in Nonfiction Picturebooks
8th	2021	Tel Aviv	Picture Books in Time
9th	2023	Osijek	The Picturebook Between Fiction and Reality
10th	2025	Lisbon	Understanding the world: Multiculturality, interculturality and global citizenship in picturebooks

Publications:

- Ricerche Di Pedagogia E Didattica. Journal of Theories and Research in Education, 14(2) (2019), special issue: Home, Lived-In Spaces and Childhood in European Picturebooks from 1945 to the Present Day

== See also ==
- Picture book
- Silent books
- Children's literature
- International Board on Books for Young Readers
- List of associations for research in children's literature
- International Research Society for Children's Literature (IRSCL)
