= Lon Po Po =

Book by Ed Young

Lon Po Po: A Red Riding Hood Story from China
- Author: Ed Young
- Illustrator: Ed Young
- Language: English
- Genre: Children's picture book
- Set in: China
- Publisher: Philomel
- Publication date: November 1989
- Publication place: United States
- Media type: Print (Hardcover and Paperback)
- Pages: 32 (first edition, hardback)
- ISBN: 978-0-399-21619-0
- OCLC: 17981442
- Dewey Decimal: 398.2/0951 E 19
- LC Class: PZ8.1.Y84 Lo 1989

Lon Po Po: A Red-Riding Hood Story from China is a children's picture book translated and illustrated by Ed Young. It was published by Philomel (Penguin Young Readers Group) in 1989 and won the 1990 Caldecott Medal for distinguished American illustrated books for children.

== Description ==
The story is a Chinese version of the popular children's fable "Little Red Riding Hood" as retold by Young. Contrary to the original fable, in which there is only one child (Little Red Riding Hood) who interacts with the nemesis of the story (the wolf), Lon Po Po (Mandarin for "wolf [maternal] grandmother") has three children, and the story is told from their perspective. The majority of the illustrations are divided into three pictures for each two-page spread (with a few exceptions). Young uses dark colors for the illustrations to set the tone of the story.

== Synopsis ==
The story is set in China. Three sisters, Shang, Tao and Paotze, are left alone overnight while their mother goes to visit their grandmother Po Po's house for her birthday (and to stay over at her mother Po Po's house for the night). Before leaving, the mother warns the girls to be safe. Meanwhile, an old wolf sees the mother leave and decides to come over to harm the children. The wolf pretends to be their grandmother, Po Po, to try to gain entry. The children question the wolf through the door and ask why he has come late. The wolf has clever answers. The two youngest children finally open the door and let the wolf in. Because of the darkness, the children can't see that it is a wolf. When it is time for bed, the children and the wolf are to sleep together. The children notice "Po Po's" wolflike characteristics. They question him. Finally, Shang (the oldest) lights a candle and, before it gets blown out, sees that Po Po is really a wolf. She devises a plan to get herself and her sisters out of the house. She tells the wolf about the delicious, magical gingko nuts that grow on the tree outside their home. The children go out and climb the tree where she tells the other two who Po Po really is, while the wolf follows. They tell the wolf to get a rope and a basket so they can pull him up the tree to get the nuts, all the while planning on dropping the wolf once in the basket. When they drop the basket, the wolf bumps his head. For the third and final time, as the wolf reaches for the nuts, the kids let go of the rope and the wolf is sent down plummeting once more. Not only did the wolf bump his head, but he broke into pieces. The girls are unaware that the wolf is dead, until they get down from the tree and see him on the ground. They check on him and they ask if he is OK. But they hear no answer. (That is, as he is now dead. He broke into pieces.) That night, the girls look at the wolf's dead body and is broken into pieces. Finally, they (after one last look of the wolf's dead and broken body) go inside the house to bed. After the mother's return, the next day they tell her what happened.

== Audiobook ==
Young's version was made into a critically acclaimed audiobook that was released in 2006. It was made into a 12-minute-long audiobook and colored video and DVD by Weston Woods Studios. It is narrated by actor B. D. Wong.

== Critical response ==
Lon Po Po has been critically acclaimed. Barbara Auerbach of the School Library Journal wrote "The shadows and cautious, frightened faces coupled with the narrator's expressive storytelling will leave viewers on the edge of their seats" Heather McNeil (Horn Book Magazine): "This production brings new life to an old favorite."

The text possess that matter of fact veracity that characterizes the best fairy tales... The water color and pastel pictures are remarkable...Overall, this is an outstanding achievement that will be pored over again and again....

—John Philbrook, San Francisco Pub. Lib. (School Library Journal)

Awards
Preceded by Song and Dance Man	Caldecott Medal recipient 1990	Succeeded by Black and White
