= Black and White (picture book) =

1990 picture book by David Macaulay

- Author: David Macaulay
- Illustrator: David Macaulay
- Genre: children's book
- Publisher: Houghton Mifflin
- Publication date: March 1990
- Publication place: United States
- ISBN: 978-0-395-52151-9
- OCLC: 246622739
- LC Class: PZ7.M1197 Bl 1990

Black and White is a 1990 postmodern children's picture book by David Macaulay. Published by Houghton Mifflin Company, it received mixed reviews upon its release. It was the recipient of the Caldecott Medal for illustration in 1991. The book tells four overlapping stories, each drawn with a distinct visual style: "Seeing Things", about a boy on a train trip by himself, "Problem Parents", about siblings whose parents behave differently one night, "A Waiting Game", about people waiting for a train, and "Udder Chaos", about cows who escape and then return to their field.

Macaulay had the idea of creating a book about journeys in the 1980s and combined several previously unrelated sketches in order to form the four stories in the book. Owing to its metafictional structure, the book is considered a main example of a postmodern picture book. The book is designed to be interpreted in a number of different ways and can be frustrating for readers who wish to have a simple narrative they can absorb without thinking too much about. The text and pictures of the book both complement each other and provide a sense of tension as they are sometimes in opposition to each other. Black and White is credited with helping to advance the form of a picture book and is seen as a direct or indirect inspiration for several other picture books.

== Background and publication ==
David Macaulay started drawing the sketches which would become Black and White in the 1980s. The idea of journeys interested Macaulay, especially the idea that turning the page could be its own journey. Eventually, Macaulay decided to combine four different stories from his sketchbook into a single book. Macaulay wanted each story to look different—"I did everything I could to visually separate each fragment"—including choosing a different medium and set of characters for each. The book was published in March 1990 by Houghton Mifflin.

== Plot ==
Each two-page spread of the book features one of four stories. In the upper left quadrant, there is a story titled "Seeing Things". In this story, a boy is on an overnight train trip to be reunited with his parents. At one point in the journey, the train's progress is stopped and he is briefly joined by what the text refers to as an "old woman" but which the illustrations suggest might be the robber from "Udder Chaos". Looking out the window, the boy is unable to tell what has stopped the train and laughs when the driver attempts to chase away what appear to be boulders. However, to the boy's amazement, the boulders begin to move off the tracks. Later the boy falls asleep only to be awoken by the train stopping and the sound of singing. Thinking he sees snow outside, the boy opens the windows but when he sticks out his hands to catch some, the boy realizes that it's actually torn up newspaper. The boy then notices "strange creatures" standing near the train who are responsible for the torn paper and singing. When the train resumes its journey, the boy falls back asleep only to be awoken at the train station where the boy is returns to his parents.

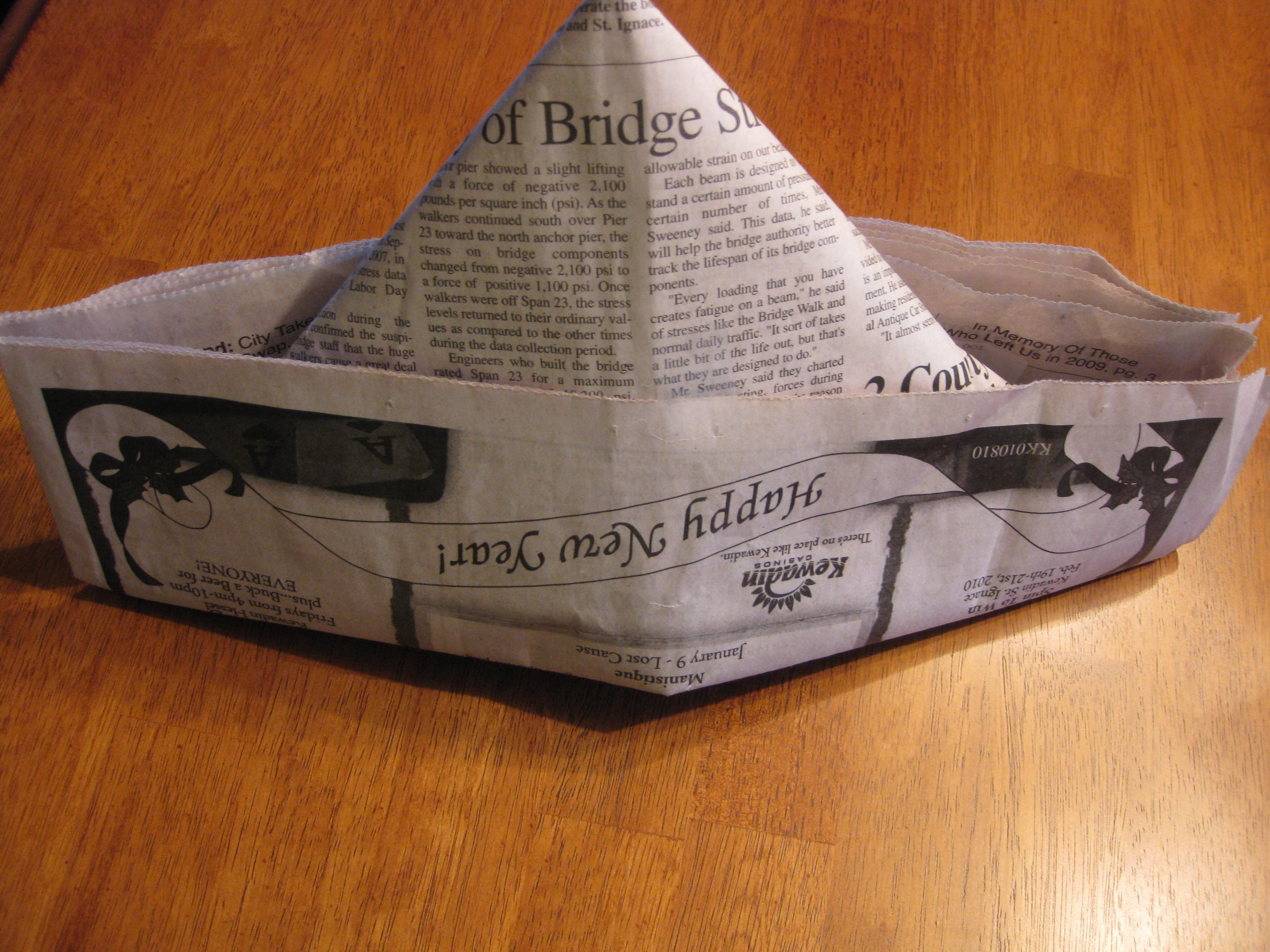
A newspaper hat similar to that worn by several different characters in Black and White.

In the lower left quadrant, the story is titled "Problem Parents". A brother and sister, with the sister serving as the narrator, know the routines of their parents who are predictable in their actions, such as leaving for work each day at 7 a.m. and returning home at 7 p.m. However, one night the children, and their dog, recognize that the parents are not their normal selves because they come home wearing newspaper costumes and singing She'll Be Coming 'Round the Mountain. The children's parents then find newspapers at home and, ignoring attempts at normal conversation topics, dress the children in newspaper also. The brother joins in the fun more quickly than his sister, who unsuccessfully attempts to jolt her parents back to normal. The narrator is horrified when her brother suggests they go out to dinner dressed as they are and manages to convince the other family members to leave the costumes at home. In the end, the narrator admits the experience is fun, though she finds her parents' antics "exhausting" when they ask her about her homework as she's heading to bed.

The upper right quadrant's story is titled "A Waiting Game", with the only text representing announcements from a loudspeaker. A number of passengers, all of whom are reading a newspaper, wait for their train at a station, which has been delayed. Eventually, the passengers finish reading their newspapers and become bored waiting for the train. One passenger, to applause, makes a triangle hat out of her newspaper causing other passengers to join in. Soon they start making newspaper shirts, bunting, and confetti. When the train arrives they throw the torn newspaper into the air. After the train leaves with the passengers, the only characters left are a robber and the station master who is cleaning up the mess from the newspapers.

The fourth story, in the lower right, is titled "Udder Chaos". While the text describes what happens if Holstein cows escape their field, the pictures illustrate the movements of a robber, dressed in black and white stripes and a black mask. At first, he hides among the cows, and then among a choir who the cows pass by, and then once again among the cows who stop the progress of a train. In the end, the robber has disappeared and the cows return home so that they can be milked.

== Writing and illustrations ==
The book is considered one of the leading examples by some scholars and educators of a postmodern picture book. Part of this is because of its metafictional aspect, something Macaulay himself spoke of in his Caldecott Medal acceptance speech, "the subject of this book is the book. It is designed to be viewed in its entirety, having its surface 'read all over.'" It is a book of and about connections—between pictures and between words and pictures. Each of the four stories is presented with a unique design and illustration style. "Seeing Things" was illustrated with watercolor, "Problem Parents" was illustrated in pen and ink and had dialogue through captions, "A Waiting Game" had colored ink, and "Udder Chaos" had colored ink with the lines removed. The printing technology enabling this kind of book with its multiple illustration styles and typesets was relatively new at the time of Black and White's publication.

The various ways the stories overlap are never fully explained and are instead left for the reader to discern. The reader is primed to interact with the writing and illustrations by the unattributed warning on the title page to "carefully" inspect the different stories. Even the writing style, utilizing the passive voice, encourages the reader to take "agency" over the story. The number of stories, and their intersections, are determined primarily through analysis by the reader of the illustrations. Further, the stories can be read in any particular order or combination and indeed sometimes can only be understood by reading the book in a non-linear manner. In the words of Macaulay, "it isn't necessary to think in straight lines to make sense." The text is written to be subtly funny through its use of irony. The illustrations also add core elements to the story; while there is an illustration of a mask on nearly every page the word does not appear in the text. This complexity suggested it could be enjoyed by both traditional picture book readers, that is, children under the age of five, but also older children and teens.

Macaulay plays with this interaction between text and pictures. At times they can be complementary as in the start of "Problem Parents" but at other times can be discordant as in "Seeing Things" when the text suggests it's an old woman on the train, while the illustrations suggest it's the robber. At times the text can be misleading, as in "Udder Chaos" where the text is about Holsteins while the illustrations focus on a robber and with some believing that the robber is merely a figment of imagination of the boy from "Seeing Things". The illustrations also intersect with one another and can even become part of the text, as when the drawing of a cow's udder becomes the U in the title for "Udder Chaos". There are also visual similarities between the stories and characters. The boy of "Seeing Things" and the robber present in that story and "Udder Chaos" both wear striped shirts, while the mask of the robber and the dog's face are quite similar. The dog, whose name tag shows "Chris", has been interpreted by some as an homage to Chris Van Allsburg whose books have a reoccurring motif of a terrier.

Themes in the story include the parent-child relationship and the interconnectivity of life. Trains are a motif through all four of the stories. There can be thematic coherence found in the two stories on stories on the left page where two sets of children are attempting to make sense of unusual events and also wishing to be reunited with their parents. The book also promotes the idea that nothing is as simple as it seems, such as with the words "Black and White" appearing in blue, white, and green font on the cover and in red font on the title page. This red font has been interpreted as a reference to the joke "What is black and white and read all over? Newspapers" given newspapers' importance to the story. Black and White has both order and chaos, expressed through the story, illustrations, and design of the book. The chaos of the story increases, reaching its climax when the only colors used are black on white on a page, before order is restored at the end of the stories and at the end of the book. The final page, featuring a hand picking up the train station from "A Waiting Game" and the nose of the dog from "Problem Parents," can have multiple interpretations.

== Reception and awards ==
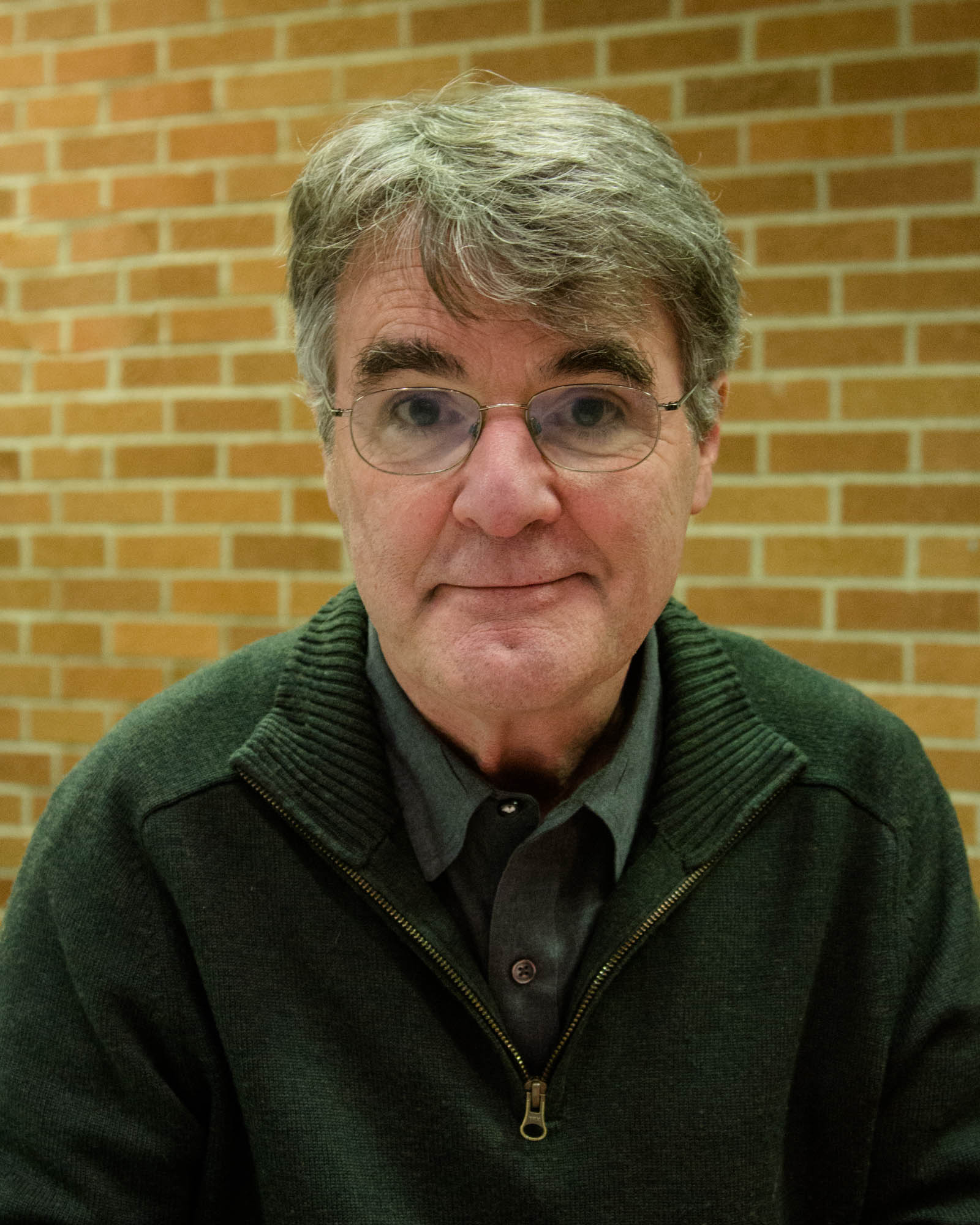
Author David Macaulay in 2012

The book was given mixed reviews at the time of its publication. Kimberly Olson Fakih praised, "Macaulay's avalanche of creativity" in the Los Angeles Times. Professor and Children's book author Liz Rosenberg also noted the book's unusual format, "In its oddity and fixed unfixity it is a genuine original, and may perhaps become a children's puzzle classic." In a mixed review, Kirkus Reviews called the book "endlessly inventive" but suggested that the complexity might be too much for readers to understand, though the reviewer later admitted her confusion was partially caused by being under deadline to produce the review. Similarly, Karen Litton writing in School Library Journal suggested the book was confusing and "more show than go" in a mostly negative review. This confusion was seen in a more positive way by The Horn Book Magazine's Mary Burns, "perhaps there is no one explanation but rather a series of playful allusions and clever delusions which are meant to be enjoyed by the freewheeling and free-spirited as an escape from the ordinary." The book proved popular immediately with children, being recognized as a "Children's Choice" by the International Reading Association in 1991.

Macaulay was awarded the 1991 Caldecott Medal for the book's illustrations; Macaulay described his hope and then disappointment at not having won for his books in the past. In his acceptance speech, he spoke of how he felt "obliged to say something tonight that matters, at least to me, and something which will, I hope, make a difference to you." He delivered his speech in four parts, each named after one of the stories from the book. Previous Caldecott Medal winner David Wiesner praised the book in 2012, "Structurally unlike any medal winner before it — or since — Black and White...redefined the way stories could be told in picture books. And, just as importantly, it did this while being very, very funny."

== Legacy ==
Black and White has been credited with helping to change the perceptions of what a picture book could be. This book was quickly seen as an important way of connecting with kids during a digital age. Black and White has been labeled a transition text from traditional to digital picture books. Despite being enjoyed by many children, when examining the book for use, teachers can feel that the complexity of the book is too much for children, while children who enjoy the book do so because of its complexity. Teachers who do choose to use the book can do so in a way that demonstrates that the whole is greater than the sum of its parts and as an example of the value gained through group collaboration and discussion of literature. Black and White was seen as inspiring future books such as The Stinky Cheese Man and Other Fairly Stupid Tales by Jon Scieszka and Lane Smith.

== See also ==
Awards
Preceded by Lon Po Po: A Red-Riding Hood Story from China	Caldecott Medal recipient 1991	Succeeded by Tuesday
