= The Way Things Work (TV series) =

French-British-American children's television series

Title card

The Way Things Work is a children's television series based on the best-selling book of the same name by David Macaulay. The series was co-produced by Millimages, Pearson Broadband, and Schlessinger Media; it was distributed by the latter. The programme ran weekly on BBC Two's Schools programming strand and weekly on CBBC's Class TV strand from 2003 to June 2004. Repeats of the programme continued until 2008. The series (hand-animated) was one of the last few educational TV programmes still shown by the BBC on CBBC. It is one of its most short-lived television series, running for only 26 15-minute episodes. The programme aims to teach basic principles of science to young viewers and revolves around the residents of the backward Mammoth Island as they struggle through daily life with the use of outlandish contraptions. The series was later dubbed into French and briefly aired in syndication on TV network France 5. A DVD containing all 26 episodes of the series was released in 2005.

The show was later adapted into Mammutland (English: Mammoth Country), a 2004 animated series produced by KI.KA and ZDF. It originated as a German-French-British cooperation.

== Concept ==
Due to the popularity of the book The Way Things Work by David Macaulay, Millimages pitched a concept for an educational television series with similar features to Schlessinger Media, who accepted the idea and agreed to distribute the programme to the BBC upon completion. Animation began in 1999, but the programme was not first aired until 2003, on both BBC2 and CBBC. The programme had a very short lifespan; it consisted of 26 episodes, each attempting to educate children about basic science, of 15 minutes each. Millimages had plans for a second series, but the programme was promptly discontinued, as it was not attracting enough audiences. It was one of the last hand-animated programmes on the BBC. The show takes features from the book, such as the constant abuse of the Woolly Mammoth, and the detailed and colourful explanations of the machines. Each episode focuses on a different area of science. The programme's plot was debated, before finally deciding on an island (later to be renamed Mammoth Island) on which the inhabitants build outlandish contraptions to make their lives easier.

Mammutland was produced in 2003 and 2004 from Millimages, Pearson Broadband, Schlessinger Media and ZDF. It was directed by Diego Zamora and written by Simon Jowett and Alastair Swinnerton. In the German version, Peter Lustig announced the beginning of the episode, sang the title song and dubbed the inventor. The series aired from 24 August to 28 September 2004 on Ki.Ka in Germany and later by ORF in Austria. It also appeared on DVD.

== Characters ==
The programme consisted of six main characters, all of whom appeared in every episode of the programme.

The Inventor: A middle-aged man on temporary vacation to Mammoth Island. Throughout the series, he was never named. He is responsible for the construction of the machines on Mammoth Island, and is always presenting labour-saving apparatus, which often caused difficulties of its own. Voiced by Dan Russell.

Olive: The Inventor's closest friend. Aged 14, she has a very inquisitive mind, and often appears cleverer than the Inventor. Voiced by Ellie Fairman.

Troy: Olive's cousin, who relies mostly on his own strength and those of the woolly mammoths, and is sometimes gullible. Voiced by Bob Saker.

Frank: Pilbeam's brother and Olive's father, who takes charge of building the Inventor's inventions. Voiced by Keith Wickham.

Pilbeam: Troy's father; married to Brenda. Although he is Frank's brother, he lives separately from him and is often unsure of Frank's plans, and is known to quarrel with his wife. Voiced by Keith Wickham.

Brenda: Troy's mother, married to Pilbeam. She is strictly opposed to the Inventors' ideas, and often argues with her husband. Voiced by Caroline Bernstein.

== Episodes ==
Episode No.	Title	Summary
1	Rolling Stones	When a mammoth stampede ruins the village, the islanders try to build decent roads, using large boulders. Topics covered: inclined planes, wedges.
2	A See Saw World	To win a 'heaviest mammoth' competition, the islanders build makeshift scales of logs and rocks to weigh them. Topics covered: levers.
3	Take a Mammoth to Water	The mammoths need their monthly washing, but the islanders cannot persuade them to bathe, until the Inventor suggests the use of winches and wheels. Topics covered: wheels and axles.
4	Fun at the Fair	Saddened by the failure of the previous year's event, Olive endeavours to ensure that Mammoth Island's annual funfair is filled with exciting attractions. Topics covered: belts and gears.
5	A Knight's Tale	In a slight parody of the Chaucer story of the same name, the islanders and a visiting knight attempt to rescue Brenda from the top of an observation tower. Topics covered: screws.
6	Pulleys	The islanders' supply of mammoth milk is running out, and they attempt to raise the mammoths from the ground for milking. Topics covered: pulleys.
7	Life on the Water	Attempting to take his mammoth herd across to Pasture Island for grazing, Pilbeam breaks the bridge and becomes stranded. The islanders build different rafts and boats, some of which fail, to rescue him. Topics covered: floating, upthrust.
8	Stuck in the Mud	Frank and Pilbeam employ oversized magnets to extract scrap metal from a sunken steamer. Matters become complicated when Troy accidentally creates an electromagnet and Frank's mammoth becomes stuck in quicksand. Topics covered: magnetism.
9	A Head Full of Steam	When Mammoth Island's new theme park, Mammoth Land, opens to the public, Troy and Olive are disappointed by the slowness of the rides. With help from the Inventor, they use steam engines to increase the velocity the Ferris wheel; but the wheel slips its moorings and runs rampant throughout the island. Topics covered: bevel gears, steam power, condensation.
10	That Sinking Feeling	The Mammoth Ferry's maiden voyage is interrupted by a tsunami, scattering its cargo. Olive and the Inventor devise a submarine to retrieve the items. Topics covered: submersibles, sinking, water pressure, density.
11	Engine Trouble	Brenda opens a pizza parlor promising 'free mammoth delivery'; but due to the docile nature of the mammoths her profits are nil. The Inventor helps build a jet engine to deliver the pizzas on time. Note: this episode contained the first appearance of Mammoth Island's rival, Dodo Island. Topics covered: jet engines, combustion, flight.
12	On Squeezing Mammoths	When Brenda's bakery burns down, the highly inefficient fire brigade floods the island, and the Inventor helps the islanders build a proper water pump. Topics covered: pumping, water pressure, air molecules.
13	Oh, For the Wings of a Mammoth	Frank and Pilbeam try to help Brenda run an awning factory while the owner is away on vacation; but stumble on the principles of flight when an awning, tied to a mammoth's back, catches the wind. The Inventor teaches them how to turn this to their advantage. Topics covered: air pressure, flight, aeroplanes, wind.
14	Somewhere Over the Mammoth	Whilst working for the Inventor, Troy experiences several phenomenons due to the way light behaves, including a rainbow. Meanwhile, the Inventor has to contend with the loss of his piggy bank, leaving him penniless with several broken glass trophies to pay for. Topics covered: light, refraction, reflection, rainbows, mirrors, light rays.
15	The Far Side	In order to curb boredom, the islanders cross a previously unexplored mountain ridge, with a mammoth for transport. When the mammoth is stuck dangling over the edge of a cliff, the Inventor uses a hot-air balloon. Topics covered: ballooning, hot air, blimps, expansion, rising, gravity.
16	Heating	When his water pipes freeze, the Inventor accidentally destroys Brenda's house, the local sauna, and his own house. Subsequently, Olive shows him the various ways in which mammoths are used to generate heat around the island, culminating in the construction of an enormous vacuum flask. Topics covered: heating water, conduction, radiation, convection currents, vacuum flasks.
17	The Sound of a Mammoth	The islanders guide their mammoth herd through a large canyon in search of fresh pasture, but lose them in various pits, ravines, and crevices after a stampede. The islanders become confused by the echoes of the mammoths' calls, and require the Inventor to construct a device to bring them all back. Topics covered: echoes, sound waves, hearing, ear anatomy.
18	Images	Due to Pilbeam's inability to complete portraits of the winners of the annual Mammoth Island golf tournament, the Inventor suggests the use of cameras and lenses to speed the process. Meanwhile, Troy suffers sunburn. Topics covered: images, photography, binoculars, lenses, picture development, magnification.
19	Cooling	During a hot summer, the islanders and mammoths compete for use of a river. Subsequently, the Inventor attempts to install an air-conditioning unit in Frank's kitchen, with disastrous results. Topics covered: air conditioning, air cooling, cooling.
20	Hot Wheels	In an attempt to beat Dodo Island, the islanders construct carts to deliver their cargo more efficiently to prospective buyers. All goes well until Olive and Troy, with a cargo of paper, reach a steep hill which they race down uncontrollably. The Inventor helps them add brakes. Meanwhile, Brenda and Pilbeam struggle to get a lovesick mammoth to take a bath. Topics covered: heat, friction, brakes, lubrication.
21	Coconut Crumble	After Troy accidentally discovers the elastic properties of the Mammoth Island coconut trees, the islanders utilize them to gather coconuts effectively, by flinging them across the island, in order to gather 200 kilos to meet a 2-hour deadline set by a fruit salesman. Topics covered: springs, elasticity, Hooke's law, mass, weighing.
22	Take It to the Bridge	To commemorate the opening of a new bridge, a musical concert is held, featuring mammoths as instruments, which ends in disaster when the Inventor cries out in pain, causing a stampede which wrecks the stage. The islanders ostracize him from the village until he can find a way to prepare a replacement concert in time for the bridge's opening. Against the orders of Frank, Olive assists him, and the pair set about building giant woodwind instruments. Topics covered: music, woodwind, brass, air flow, sound waves, instruments, vibration.
23	She Wears My Ring	Brenda goes to market, leaving Troy and Pilbeam in charge of her house. After Troy accidentally washes Brenda's prized wedding ring down the sink, Pilbeam enlists the help of Olive, Frank and the Inventor to dig up the road and find it in the water pipes before Brenda returns. Topics covered: pressure, water pressure, plungers, water flow, suction.
24	Shocking	When Troy and his mammoth both spear the same lemon with zinc and copper lances during the annual Mammoth Island lemon harvest, they receive an electric shock. Following this, Brenda and Pilbeam attempt to soothe the mammoth by grooming it with plastic combs; this creates static electricity, attracting litter from across the village. Subsequently, the Inventor explains the basic principles of electricity to the islanders who use the acidic qualities of lemons to help them power their machinery to increase the yield of the harvest. Topics covered: electricity, current, positive and negative charge, static electricity, acid, batteries, circuits.
25	Sensors and Sensorbility	Brenda inherits the Mammoth Inn, a decrepit mammoth-powered hotel, from her deceased Aunt Maude. When Frank and Olive arrive to collect their inheritance, Brenda enlists their help and the Inventor to repair the inn and modernize it with devices such as metal detectors, security cameras and smoke alarms. However, when a wealthy businessman expresses interest in buying the inn, but only if mammoths are present and the inn is not modernized, Pilbeam struggles to hide the machines. Topics covered: smoke alarms, metal detectors, lasers, escalators, sensors, counterweights, infra-red.
26	Telecommunications	In the final episode of the series, the Inventor attempts to introduce a telephone network to Mammoth Island after the islanders begin using the dangerous method of flinging coded boulders to Dodo Island in order to communicate. Complications arise when the mammoths begin using the telephone poles as scratching posts, necessitating the use of mobile phones. Topics covered: telephones, exchanges, satellites, signals, mobile phones, fiber-optic systems.

== Reception ==
The series was released on the BBC to general acclaim; however, late into its airing, the BBC believed that it had not been as popular as they thought it would, and, by early 2002, the show had been discontinued before Millimage's plans of a second series could be carried through. Millimages released a DVD of the existing 26 episodes in 2005. The series won a Gold World Award for Children's Programming at the New York Festival 2004.
