= Ann Downer =

American novelist

- Born: November 28, 1960 Arlington, Virginia, U.S.
- Died: November 19, 2015 (aged 54) Boston, Massachusetts, U.S.
- Occupation: Writer
- Genre: Fantasy literature

Ann Downer (November 28, 1960 – November 19, 2015) was an American writer, principally of fantasy novels for children and young adults, as well as short fiction and poetry.

== Biography ==
Ann Downer was born in Arlington, Virginia in 1960 and grew up in Manila and Bangkok and recalled avidly reading fantasy fiction.

Her first published work was a trilogy published in the late 1980s and early 1990s (The Spellkey, The Glass Salamander, and The Books of the Keepers), collected in a revised edition in 1995 as The Spellkey Trilogy. A second series for middle-grade readers, begun in 2003 with the novel Hatching Magic, continues with The Dragon of Never-Was (2006). The Spellkey series is high fantasy, taking place wholly in an invented world and chronicling a good-versus-evil story of two foundlings, a stableboy and an ostracized seer. Hatching Magic and its sequel, The Dragon of Never-Was, are contemporary fantasies with elements of time travel. The series follows a young girl, Theodora Oglethorpe, as she discovers a world of wizardry and magic. While Downer's books are frequently compared to the work of Patricia A. McKillip and Diana Wynne Jones, she has cited the influence of Ursula K. Le Guin's Earthsea books and the Chronicles of Prydain by Lloyd Alexander in shaping her outlook and prose style.

She was diagnosed with ALS in 2014 and died on 19 November 2015 in Boston, MA.

== Bibliography ==
Spellkey series

- The Spellkey (1987), jacket by Caldecott-medal winner David Wiesner, also a UK paperback edition from Futura/Macmillan.
- The Glass Salamander (1989), jacket by Caldecott-medal winner David Wiesner
- The Books of the Keepers (1993)

All three books were collected into a paperback omnibus edition, The Spellkey Trilogy, published by Baen Books in 1995.

Hatching Magic series U.S. edition jackets by Omar Rayyan

- Hatching Magic (2003; Scholastic Book Club selection; translated into German, Czech, Dutch, Italian, Portuguese, Polish, Thai, and Spanish; additional languages pending)
- The Dragon of Never-Was (2006)

Other Fiction

- "Somnus’s Fair Maid" (short-listed for the James Tiptree Jr. prize), a Regency retelling of the Sleeping Beauty fairy tale, in Black Thorn, White Rose, edited by Terri Windling and Ellen Datlow
- Short stories and poetry in Gargoyle Magazine in the late 1980s, including excerpts from an unpublished novel.
- "Bread-and-Butterflies" in Alice Redux (2006), a collection of short fiction inspired by Lewis Carroll and edited by Richard Peabody.
