= The Day the World Broke =

1997 video game

- Publisher: Houghton Mifflin Interactive
- Producer: WNET
- Artist: David Wiesner
- Engine: mTropolis
- Platform: Microsoft Windows
- Release: NA: 1997
- Genres: Graphic adventure, puzzle
- Mode: Single-player

The Day the World Broke is a 1997 video game developed and published by Houghton Mifflin Interactive. It is an adventure video game in which the player travels to the Earth's core. The game was conceived and illustrated by artist David Wiesner. Upon release, The Day the World Broke received average reviews, with critics praising the game's visual design and sense of humour, but critiquing the bugs that prevented reviewers from progressing the game.

== Gameplay ==
Gameplay screenshot

Players use point and click interactions to explore 22 locations. The objective of the game is to collect various items from characters to fulfil the requests of the Mechanimals and extract them from the Four Elements Room, which can be located by exploring the world and interacting with characters. Players can add items to their inventory by dragging and dropping objects into it, and give characters an inventory item by dragging it from their inventory to the location of the character. The game's ending differs depending on the choices made by players throughout the game, and players can select dialog choices from a list of responses to characters.

== Plot ==
The World Works, the machine that runs the world has gone awry, and players must journey into the Earth's core to fix it. This has caused strange and unexplained effects across the planet, including cows flying through the air and floods in the Sahara Desert. Bud and Julius, the two engineers of the World Works, request the player's help as they prepare for a Great Tune Up, an event not held in millions of years. The player learns that part-animal, part-machine characters named Mechanimals are responsible for the disturbances.

== Development ==
The narrative and artwork for The Day the World Broke was created by American children's book illustrator David Wiesner. Wiesner originally presented his ideas to Clarion Books as a picture book, before realising the proposed story was too long for a book and adapting it to a digital medium. The game was co-produced by the Kravis Multimedia Education Center at the New York network WNET.

== Reception ==
Reception

Review scores
Publication	Score
Personal Computer World	4/5
Quad-City Times	2.5/4

Paul Trueman of Personal Computer World enjoyed the game's "artfully surreal" and "lavishly-illustrated" presentation, but felt its puzzles were too difficult for its target audience and lacked direction which may "bore some younger minds". Recommending the game, Library Journal enjoyed the "wryly" tongue-in-cheek humor and "clever" sight and word gags. The Quad-City Times enjoyed the game's concept and its "fantastic display" of disasters, but encountered several bugs which "nearly ruined the fun". Elise Gunst of the Houston Chronicle felt that Weisner's "hand-pained, dreamlike environments" set it apart from other adventure games, but found the game's pace slow as she was unable to skip lengthy dialogue, and similarly encountered bugs that locked her progress.
