= Flotsam (Wiesner book) =

2006 children's book by David Wiesner

- Front cover
- Author: David Wiesner
- Illustrator: David Wiesner
- Cover artist: Weisner
- Genre: Children's picture book
- Publisher: Clarion/Houghton Mifflin
- Publication date: 2006
- Publication place: United States
- ISBN: 978-0-618-19457-5
- OCLC: 71000114
- Dewey Decimal: [E] 22
- LC Class: PZ7.W6367 Fl 2006

Flotsam is a children's wordless picture book written and illustrated by David Wiesner. Published by Clarion/Houghton Mifflin in 2006, it was the 2007 winner of the Caldecott Medal; the third win for David Wiesner. The book contains illustrations of underwater life with no text to accompany them.

== Plot ==
The book has no words, instead it is told through pictures. A boy is at the beach studying life at the beach, when an old camera washes up on shore. His parents and the lifeguard don't know anything about it. He takes the film to get it developed and gets a new photo. When he sees the photos, he finds them of amazing things of the sea that may not even be possible. They consist of a robot fish, an octopus reading, a pufferfish being used as a hot air balloon, turtles with cities on their backs, tiny visiting aliens, and giant starfish with islands on their backs. The final photo consists of a girl, who is holding a photo of a boy, who is holding a photo of a boy, who is holding a photo of a girl, and so on. Using his magnifying glass and microscope, he finds that the first is of a boy in old clothes from about a century ago waving. The boy figures out that he is one in a long line of photographers who have found this camera. As his parents tell him it was time to go, he decided to continue the chain by using the camera to take a picture of himself. However, at that moment a wave hits washing all the photos away, but regardless the boy tosses the camera back into the ocean to start the cycle over again. It is carried by a variety of fish and other sea life across the ocean, the Arctic, and even a city of mermaids until it again washes ashore and another child finds it.

== Critical reception ==
Flotsam was published to glowing reviews. According to the Kirkus Reviews, “From arguably the most inventive and cerebral visual storyteller in children's literature comes a wordless invitation . . . not to be resisted.” Flotsam has won the 2007 Randolph Caldecott Medal for the most distinguished American picture book for children. Caldecott Medal Committee Chair Janice Del Negro has said of Flotsam, "Telling tales through imagery is what storytellers have done through the ages. Wiesner's wordless tale resonates with visual images that tell his story with clever wit and lively humor,". Horn Book Magazine says, "The meticulous and rich detail of Wiesner's watercolors makes the fantasy involving and convincing."

== Awards ==
Awards:

- The 2007 recipient of the Caldecott Medal for illustration
- A New York Times Best Illustrated Children's Book
- A Publishers Weekly Best Book of the Year
- A Kirkus Reviews Best Children's Book of 2006
- A Booklist Editor's Choice 2006
- A School Library Journal Best Book of 2006
- A Horn Book Fanfare Title
- A Child (magazine) Best Book of the Year
- A Parenting (magazine) Book of the Year
- A Nick Jr. Channel Best Children's Book of 2006
- A Book Sense Children's Pick, Autumn 2006
- A Washington Post Top 10 Picture Book of the Year
- A Parents' Choice Award Winner
- A 2006 National Parenting Publications Gold Award Winner
- New York Public Library, 100 Titles for Reading & Sharing
- Chicago Public Library, Best Books of the Year
- An Oppenheim Toy Portfolio Platinum Award Winner 2007

== See also ==
- Website dedicated to "Flotsam"
- Audio interviews with author
- Animated trailer for "Flotsam"

Awards
Preceded by The Hello, Goodbye Window	Caldecott Medal recipient 2007	Succeeded by The Invention of Hugo Cabret
