= Silent books =

Wordless picture books

Silent books are wordless picture books.

In 2012, the International Board on Books for Young People (IBBY) launched its Silent Books project in response to the large numbers of refugees from the Middle East and Africa on the island of Lampedusa, Italy. The first part of the project was to provide books to local and refugee children that could be read regardless of language. This led to the creation of the first library on Lampedusa. The second part of the project was to create collections of silent books. Over 100 books from 20 countries were collected from IBBY's national sections. One set was deposited at the Palazzo delle Esposizioni in Rome, another at the library in Lampedusa, and another as part of a travelling exhibition. Since then, IBBY has created new collections of silent books biannually.

IBBY Italia and IBBY Sweden have both produced guides for reading silent books.

== Lampedusa collections ==
Individual books are nominated by IBBY's national sections, and the collections are displayed at IBBY congresses and at the annual Bologna Children's Book Fair.

=== Lampedusa collection 1 (2013) ===
110 books were nominated from 4 continents
Honour list:

- Daniel Defoe & Ajubel, Robinson Crusoe, Media Vaca, 2008
- Ara Jo, 로켓 보이 (The Rocket Boy), Hansol Soo Book, 2011
- Raymond Briggs, The Snowman, Puffin Books, 2011 (first published in 1978)
- Katy Couprie & Antonin Louchard, Tout un monde (A Whole World), Thierry Magnier, 1999
- Suzy Lee, 파도야 놀자 (Wave), BIR Publishing, 2009 (first published by Chronicle Books, San Francisco, 2008)
- Madalena Matoso, Todos Fazemos Tudo (We All Do Everything), Planeta Tangerina, 2011 (first published by Éditions Notari, Genève 2011)
- Gonzalo Moure Trenor & Alicia Varela, El arenque rojo (The Red Herring), SM, 2012
- Shaun Tan, The Arrival, Lothian Children's Books, 2006
- Marije & Ronald Tolman, De boomhut (The Tree House), Uitgeverij Lemniscaat, 2009
- David Wiesner, Flotsam, Clarion Books, 2006

Honorary Mention Amnesty International:

- Nicole De Cock, Aan de overkant (On the Far Side), Gottmer Publishing Group, 2006

Honorary Mention IBBY Italia:

- Iela Mari & Enzo Mari, La mela e la farfalla (The Apple and the Butterfly), Babalibri, 2004 (first published in 1969)

Honorary Mention Palazzo Delle Esposizioni:

- Bente Olesen Nyström, Hr. Alting (Mr. Everything), Gyldendal, 2006

=== Lampedusa collection 2 (2015) ===
51 books were nominated from 18 countries
Honour list:

- Ronan Badel, L'ami paresseux (The Lazy Friend), Autrement/Gecko Press, 2014 (nominated by IBBY France / IBBY New Zealand)
- Emmi Jormalainen, Puu (The Tree), Studio Panama, 2013 (nominated by IBBY Finland)
- Su-yeon Kim, Eoneu Badatgaeui Haru (A Day at the Beach), Borim Press, 2012 (nominated by KBBY)
- Eva Maceková, 12 Hodin s Oskarem (12 Hours With Oscar), Baobab, 2012 (nominated by IBBY Czech Republic)
- Fanette Mellier, Dans la lune (On the Moon), Editions du Livre, 2013 (nominated by IBBY France)

Menzione Autorita Garante Per L'Infanzia e L'Adolescenza:

- Patti Kim, Sonia Sánchez, Neoneun jigeum eodie inni (Where Are You? Here I Am), Must B Publishing, 2014

Menzione Amnesty International:

- Alison Jay, Out of the Blue, Barefoot Books, Oxford, 2014.

=== Lampedusa collection 3 (2017) ===
79 books were nominated from 20 countries
Honour list:

- Gregory Rogers, The Boy, the Bear, the Baron, the Bard and Other Dramatic Tales, Allen & Unwin, Crows Nest NSW, 2015
- Niels Pieters, Vos en Goudvis, (Fox and Goldfish), De Eenhoorn, Wielsbeke, 2015
- JonArno Lawson, Sidney Smith, Sidewalk Flowers, Groundwood Books, Toronto, 2015
- Lars Bo Peterson, Over Under, Carlsen, Copenhagen, 2016
- Bastien Contraire, Les Intrus (The Intruders), Albin Michel Jeunesse, Paris, 2016
- Marie Poirier, Vu d'en haut (Seen From Above), Editions des Grandes Personnes, Paris, 2016
- Giovanna Zoboli, Mariachiara di Giorgio, Professione coccodrillo (Professional Crocodile), Topipittori, Milano, 2017
- Maurizio A. C., Quariello, 45, Orecchio Acerbo, Roma, 2017
- Junko Murayama, Sawaru Meiro 1 & 2 (Braille Mazes 1 & 2), Shogakukan, Tokyo, 2015
- Arnoud Wierstra, Babel, Gottmer, Amsterdam, 2016
- Charlotte Dematons, Holland op z'n moist (The Most Beautiful Holland) Leopold/Gemeentemuseum Den Haag, Amsterdam, 2015
- David Pintor, Barcelona, Kalandraka, Pontevedra, 2015
- Marla Frazee, The Farmer and the Clown, Beach Lane Books, New York, 2014.

=== Lampedusa collection 4 (2019) ===
67 books were nominated from 16 countries
Honour list:

- Ayesha AlBadi, Ah, It's Inflating!, AlFulk, United Arab Emirates, 2018
- Marta Bartolj, Kje Si? (Where Are You?), Miš založba, Dob, 2018
- Ilan Brenman, Guilherme Karsten, Engaños (Tricks), V&R Editoras, Buenos Aires/Ciudad de México 2017 (ed. or. Melhoramentos, Brasil, 2015)
- Jorge Campos, Alter-Nativo (Alter-Native), Aira Editorial, Baixo, 2017
- Icinori, E poi, Orecchio Acerbo, Roma, 2018 (ed.or. Albin Michel Jeunesse, Paris, 2018)
- Eva Lindström, Limpan är sugen (Sizzler is Peckish), En bok för alla, Stockholm, 2017
- Sven Nordqvist, Hundpromenaden (The Dog Walk), Opal, Bromma, 2018
- Nazli Tahvili, Chalk Eagle, Tiny Owl, London, 2018
- Judith Vanistendael, Blokje om (Round the Block), Querido Kinderboeken, Amsterdam, 2018
- Geert Vervaeke, Tierendium. Een kijk-en zoekboek (Zoo. A Search-and-Find Book), Lannoo, Tielt

Menzione Speciale Palazzo Delle Esposizioni:

- Sassafras de Bruyn, De jager en zijn hond: een wonderlijke reis door de wereld van Bruegel (The Hunter and His Dog – A Journey Through the Wonderous World of Bruegel), Lannoo, Tielt, 2018

Menzione Speciale Amnesty International:

- Ji Hyeon Lee, La porta (The Door), Orecchio Acerbo, Roma, 2018 (originally Iyagikot Publishing, Seoul, 2017)

=== Lampedusa collection 5 (2021) ===
76 books were nominated from 22 countries
Honour list 2021:

- Stedho (Steven Dhondt), Daan Quichot: De spaghetti van opa Pier (Daan Quichot: Grandpa Pier's Spaghetti), Baeckens Books, Mechelen, 2019 (Belgium)
- Peter Van den Ende, Zwerveling (The Wanderer), Lannoo, Tielt, 2020 (Belgium)
- Cécile Gariép, Objet perdu (Lost Object), Les Éditions de la Pastèque, Montreal, 2019 (Canada)
- Kinga Rofusz, Otthon (Home), Vivandra books, Budapest, 2018 (Hungary)
- Javier Sáez-Castán & Manuel Marsol, Museum, Orecchio acerbo, Rome, 2019 (Italy)
- Group Mokomoko, Sanbiki no kobuta (The Three Little Pigs: Cloth Picture Book), Group Mokomoko, Tokyo, 2020 (Japan)
- Deok-Kyu Choi, 커다란 손 (Father Big Hands), YUNedition, Goyang, 2020 (Korea)
- Jeon Mihwa, 그러던 어느 날 (Then One Day), Munhakdongne Publishing Group, Seoul, 2019 (Korea)
- Rajendra Bhakta Joshi & Binita Buddhacharya, चङ्गा (Kite), Nepalese Society for Children's Literature, Kathmandu, 2020 (Nepal)
- Ram Kumar Pande & Dev Koimee, नेपाल र यती (Nepaland Yati), Nepalese Society for Children's Literature, Kathmandu, 2020 (Nepal)
- Yanik Coat, Aleph, Gecko Press, Wellington, 2018 (orig. Albin Michel, Paris, 2017) (New Zealand)
- Karin Cyren, Maraton, Lilla Piratförlaget, Stockholm, 2019 (Sweden)
- Albertine, Séraphine: l'anniversaire (Séraphine: The Birthday), La Joie de lire, Geneva, 2020 (Switzerland)
- Mies van Hout, Guck-Guck! Dreieckig (Peekaboo! Triangle), Aracari Verlag, Zurich, 2018 (Switzerland)
- Mies van Hout, Guck-Guck! Viereckig (Peekaboo! Rectangle), Aracari Verlag, Zurich, 2018 (Switzerland)
- Mies van Hout, Guck-Guck! Rund (Peekaboo! Round), Aracari Verlag, Zurich, 2018 (Switzerland)

=== Lampedusa collection 6 (2023) ===
70 books were nominated from 22 countries
Honour list:

- Freya Blackwood, The Boy and the Elephant, HarperCollins, Sydney, 2021 (Australia)
- Ruth Ohi, Blanket, Groundwood, Toronto, 2022 (Canada)
- Rafael Yockteng, Jairo Buitrago, Ugh! Un relato del Pleistoceno, Babel Libros, 2022 (Colombia)
- Óscar Pantoja, Flor Capella, Cazucá, Rey Naranjo, Bogotà, 2020 (Colombia)
- Kati Närhi, Kadoksissa, Capuchina Kustannus, 2022 (Finland)
- Benjamin Gottwald, Spinne spielt Klavier, Carlsen Verlag Gmbh, Hamburg, 2022 (Germany)
- Jeugov, Il fiore ritrovato, Topipittori, Milano, 2022 (Italy)
- Lee Myung-ae, 휴가 (Vacation), Kidari Publishing, 2021 (Republic of Korea)
- Renske Gerstel, Rondo, Uitgeverij De Harmonie, Amsterdam, 2021 (Netherlands)
- Fran Parreño (idea Gonçal López-Pampló), On va aquesta gent, Animallibres, Barcelona, 2021 (Spain, OEPLI Organización Española para el Libro Infantil y Juvenil)

Futuro Anteriore:

- Elena Safonova, Река, Albus Corvus, Mosca, 2021
- Topor, I Masochisti, Vanvere Edizioni, Roma, 2022
- Pino Tovaglia, Una storia lunga come, Lazy Dog, Milano, 2022

Menzione Speciale Palazzo Delle Esposizioni:

- Katsumi Komagata, Moon Phase, One Stroke, Tokyo, 2019

Menzione speciale - Sea-watch.org:

- Dipacho, Antonia va al río, Cataplum Libros, Bogotà, 2019

== See also ==
- Bologna Children's Book Fair
