= Cathedral (children's book) =

1973 illustrated book by David Macaulay

Cathedral: The Story of its Construction
- Author: David Macaulay
- Language: English
- Publisher: Houghton Mifflin
- Publication date: 1973
- Publication place: United States of America
- Pages: 80
- ISBN: 978-0-395-17513-2

Cathedral: The Story of its Construction is an illustrated book written by David Macaulay. Published in 1973 by Houghton Mifflin, it was the author's first book.

Cathedral tells the story of the construction of a great medieval cathedral using pen-and-ink drawings. It won the 1975 Deutscher Jugendliteraturpreis for children's non-fiction. It was adapted into a television documentary in 1986.
