= The Three Pigs =

2001 picture book by David Wiesner

- Author: David Wiesner
- Illustrator: David Wiesner
- Cover artist: Wiesner
- Genre: Children’s book
- Publisher: Clarion/Houghton Mifflin
- Publication date: 2001
- Publication place: United States
- Pages: 40 pages
- ISBN: 978-0-618-00701-1
- OCLC: 45002235
- Dewey Decimal: [E] 21
- LC Class: PZ7.W6367 Th 2001

The Three Pigs is a children's picture book that was written and illustrated by David Wiesner. Published in 2001 by Houghton Mifflin/Clarion, the book is based on the traditional tale of the Three Little Pigs, though in this story they step out of their own tale and wander into others, depicted in different illustration styles. Wiesner won the 2002 Caldecott Medal for his illustrations, Wiesner's second of three such medals.

== Plot ==
The story starts with three pigs who decided to build a house. However, two of the three pigs love to play. The other is very responsible and hardworking. He advised the other two pigs to build a good house in case the wolf comes. The first pig, the laziest, made his house out of straw. The second pig, who is not very responsible made his house out of sticks because it was easier and faster. The third pig, who is hard-working made his house out of bricks. Therefore, the third one took longer to finish up his house and the other two made fun of him. According to Amazon Editorial Reviews, when the wolf approaches the first house and blows it in, he blows the pig right out of the story frame. One by one, the pigs exit the fairy tale's border and set off on an adventure of their own. Folding a page of their own story into a paper airplane, the pigs fly off to visit other storybooks, rescuing about-to-be-slain dragons and luring the cat and the fiddle out of their nursery rhyme.

== Purposed film adaptation ==
In May 2002, it was reported that the book was optioned to Walt Disney Animation Studios, and its development was announced in December 2003 as a 2D/3D animated hybrid film. However, the project was eventually taken off the schedule and was cancelled for unknown reasons.

Awards
Preceded by So You Want to Be President?	Caldecott Medal recipient 2002	Succeeded by My Friend Rabbit
