= Sparkletts =

US bottled water brand

Sparkletts is a bottled water brand and a direct delivery home and office provider founded in Los Angeles in 1925. It is now owned by DS Services of America, Inc.

== History ==
Sparkletts was founded in 1925 by Burton N. Arnds Sr. along with partners, Washburne and Bollinger in Los Angeles. Dissatisfied with municipal water supply, he built a bottling plant near an east Los Angeles well and christened the company Sparkling Artesian Water Co. As demand grew, it outgrew its original facility, then Arnds commissioned an 80,000 square foot replacement at 4500 Lincoln Avenue, north of downtown Los Angeles. Due to supplies of free-flowing underground water, no containment tanks or reservoirs were necessary to keep the plant operating.

Sparkletts was sold to Foremost Dairies in 1964, which was in turn acquired by McKesson-Robbins, based in San Francisco. In 2000, Sparkletts was subsumed into the Danone Group and in 2003, DS Waters was created, with Sparkletts as one of its bottled water delivery brands. In 2014, DS Waters of America, Inc. announced that it has changed its name to DS Services of America, Inc.

Sparkletts delivers FIJI Water, LaCroix, Sparkling ICE, and coffee brands.

The company was featured in Visiting... with Huell Howser Episode 831.

== Environmentalism and corporate responsibility ==
Sparkletts provided bottled water for cooking and drinking as an alternative to the well water to about 200 residents of the unincorporated community of Hinkley, CA whose well water was contaminated from cancer-causing chromium-6 that kills algae and protects metal from Pacific Gas & Electric natural pumping station which is in the case portrayed in "Erin Brockovich". The bottled water helped ease the strain of residents living without running water.
