= Wordless picture book =

A wordless picture book is a picture book whose narrative is expressed through the illustrations.

== Format ==
Wordless picture books, according to Arizona State University professor Frank Serafini, have "visually rendered narratives". The narrative can use elements of graphic novels such as gutters and panels. The narrative can also be expressed through full-page illustrations, with the story advanced by turning the page. With this kind of book, the reader participates in creating the narrative. The reader must interpret the character's actions, feelings, and motivations without text to affirm; understand some ambiguity in the narrative may remain; and create and explain hypothesis about the events of the book.

Wordless picture books will frequently have text containing metadata about the book, such as its title, illustrator, and copyright notice, and can also contain incidental text such as signs. Some of these books will also contain dialogue, onomatopoeia and as a framing device to begin or end the story. In the words of Serafini, "sparse written text that may be included there is there to support the visual images, anchor the narrative sequence, and call attention to various aspects of the visual narrative."

== History ==
These books began as educational tools for young children to tell stories and can still be a useful format for pre-literature children. However, some more recent wordless picture books require the reader to be acquainted with conventions around reading books and can be a fun challenge for older readers. Further, some wordless picture books address themes like slavery which are topically more appropriate for older readers. The number of wordless picture books has increased during the end of the 20th Century and during the 21st Century. David Wiesner has won 3 Caldecott Medals for his wordless picture books.

== Use in teaching ==
Because of the reader participation in the wordless picture book these stories can offer benefits for emerging readers. These kinds of books can be stepping stones for readers to graphic novels and other non-traditional texts. These can also be used with older students for teaching around inferencing and helping students to make explicit implicit understandings. This kind of work can also be useful with English-language learners as it lets them improve their spoken language proficiency with texts more complex than they would be able to read in English. Wordless picture books can also be used as writing prompts, with students providing their own narration or dialogue. These books may also be useful for expanding cultural knowledge and understanding.

== See also ==
- Silent books
- Wordless novel
