= The Way Things Work =

Children's book illustrated by David Macaulay

- Book cover for The Way Things Work
- Author: David Macaulay; Neil Ardley
- Illustrator: Macaulay
- Language: English
- Genre: Educational
- Publisher: Houghton Mifflin
- Publication date: 1988
- Publication place: United States
- Pages: 400
- ISBN: 0-395-42857-2
- OCLC: 17917341
- Dewey Decimal: 600 19
- LC Class: T47 .M18 1988

The Way Things Work is a 1988 nonfiction book by David Macaulay with technical text by Neil Ardley. It is a whimsical introduction to everyday machines and the scientific principles behind their operation, describing machines as simple as levers and gears and as complicated as radio telescopes and automatic transmissions. Every page consists primarily of one or more large diagrams describing the operation of the relevant machine. These diagrams are informative but playful, in that most show the machines operated, used upon, or represented by woolly mammoths, and are accompanied by anecdotes from a mysterious inventor of the mammoths' (fictive) role in the operation. The book's concept was later developed into two short-lived animated TV shows (the former produced by Millimages and distributed by Schlessinger Media, and the latter produced by Children's Television Workshop and Film Roman), a Dorling Kindersley interactive CD-ROM (including a spin-off pinball game, Pinball Science), and a board game. A family "ride" involving animatronics and a 3-D film based on the book was one of the original attractions at the San Francisco Metreon, but closed in 2001.

== Revised editions ==
A revised and updated version, The New Way Things Work, released on October 26, 1998, contains additional text on the workings of computers and digital technology. A number of pages were dropped, among them a two-page demonstration of a mechanical coin-operated parking meter and the original descriptions of computing. The original's computing section included four pages explaining the workings and the distinctions between a calculator and a general-purpose computer, and four pages on binary arithmetic, logical AND and OR gates, and how these are assembled into a half adder and full adder; these were replaced with entirely new art and more detailed descriptions, with a longer story, 'The Last Mammoth', depicting a lonely mammoth invited to visit the 'Digital Domain' by its proprietor Bill, which uses the mammoth's assistance and a humorous pumpkin-and-apple-based mechanical computer to create a video depiction of a community of mammoths. Like the previous version, a CD-ROM version was released.

A substantially revised edition, The Way Things Work Now, was published in October 2016 by Houghton Mifflin Harcourt and Dorling Kindersley.

== Contents for The New Way Things Work ==
- Part One — The Mechanics of Movement: Introduction, The Inclined Plane, Levers, The Wheel and Axle, Gears and Belts, cams and Cranks, Pulleys, Screws, Rotating Wheels, Springs, Friction
- Part Two — Harnessing the Elements: Introduction, Floating, Flying, Pressure Power, Exploiting Heat, Nuclear Power
- Part Three — Working with Waves: Introduction, Light and Images, Photography, Printing, Sound and Music, Telecommunications
- Part Four — Electricity and Automation: Introduction, Electricity, Magnetism, Sensors and Detectors
- Part Five — The Digital Domain: Making Bits, Storing Bits, Processing Bits, Sending Bits, Using Bits, Epilogue
- Eureka! — The Invention of Machines

With a glossary of technical terms and an index at the back of the book. While the individual sections and subsections are changed in The Way Things Work Now, the structure and Table of Contents remain the same.

== Publishing history ==
- Scholastic Corporation, 1988. ISBN 0-590-42989-2.
- Houghton Mifflin, 1988. ISBN 0-395-42857-2.
- Houghton Mifflin, 1998. ISBN 0-395-93847-3.
- Dorling Kindersley, 2004. ISBN 1-4053-0238-0.
- Dorling Kindersley, 2016. ISBN 0-2412-8219-5.
- Houghton Mifflin, 2016. ISBN 1-3286-6310-8.
- Clarion Books, 2023. ISBN 0-544-82438-5.
