= David Wiesner =

American illustrator and writer of children's books (born 1956)

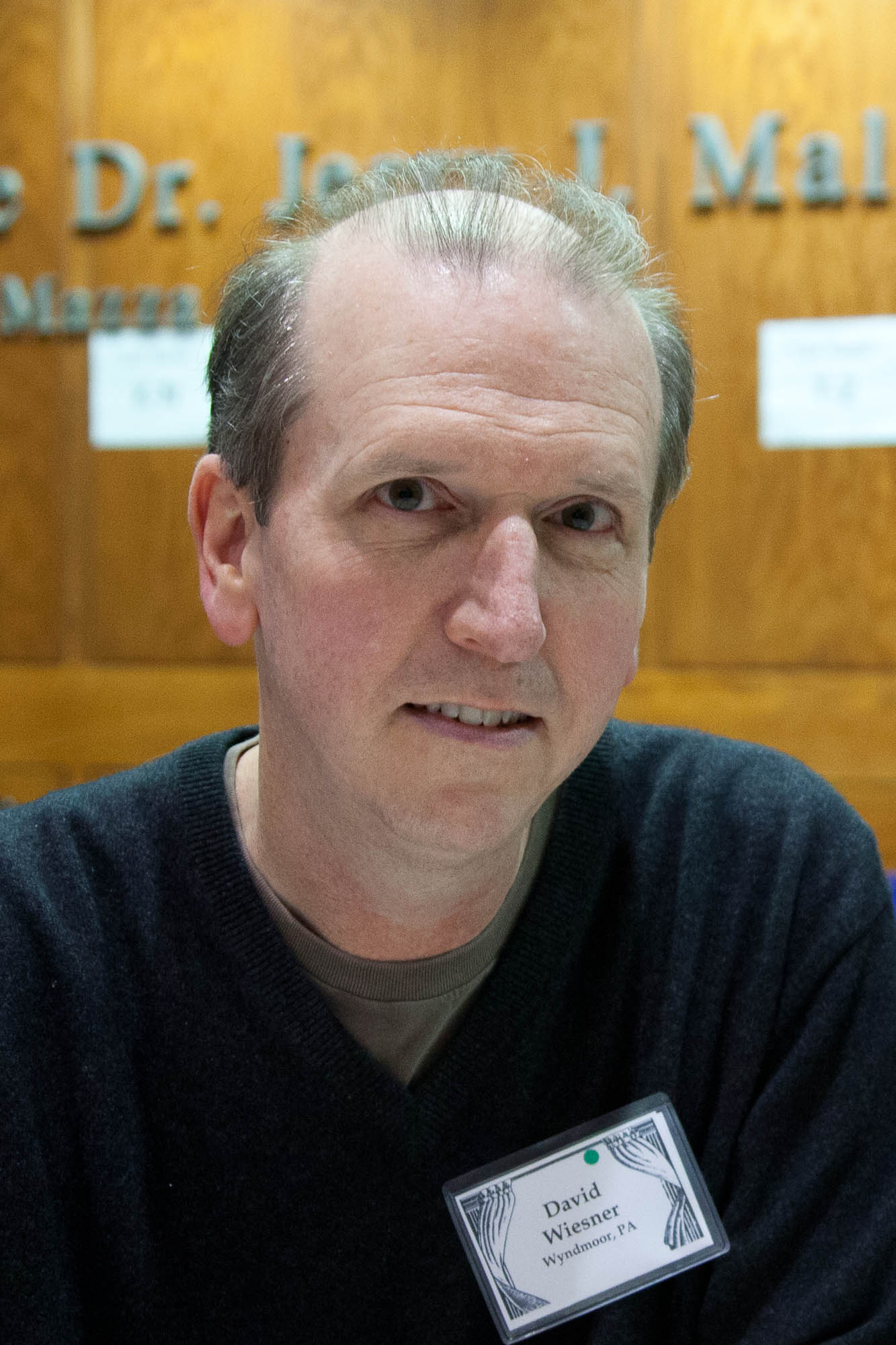
- Wiesner at the Mazza Museum in 2011
- Born: David Wiesner; February 5, 1956 (age 70); Bridgewater Township, New Jersey
- Occupations: Illustrator, writer
- Writing career
- Period: 1980–present
- Genre: Children's picture books
- Notable works: Free Fall; Tuesday; Sector 7; The Three Pigs; Flotsam; Mr. Wuffles!
- Notable awards: Caldecott Medal; 1992, 2002, 2007

David Wiesner (born February 5, 1956) is an American illustrator and writer of children's books, known best for picture books including some that tell stories without words. As an illustrator he has won three Caldecott Medals recognizing the year's "most distinguished American picture book for children" and he was one of five finalists in 2008 for the biennial, international Hans Christian Andersen Award, the highest recognition available for creators of children's books.

== Life ==
Wiesner was born and raised in Bridgewater Township, New Jersey, and attended Bridgewater-Raritan High School. He graduated from Rhode Island School of Design with a Bachelor of Fine Arts in illustration. Wiesner currently resides outside of Philadelphia with his family.

== Career ==
Wiesner's first book was Honest Andrew, a picture book with text by Gloria Skurzynski, published by Harcourt Brace Jovanovich in 1980. That year he also illustrated a novel by Avi, Man From the Sky (Knopf, 1980). After illustrating a dozen or more books with other writers, he and his wife Kim Kahng co-wrote Loathsome Dragon, a picture book with his illustrations that G.P. Putnam's published in 1987. Since then Wiesner has created many picture books solo—as writer and illustrator, or stories without words. Free Fall (book)|Free Fall (Lothrop, Lee & Shepard, 1988) was a Caldecott Honor Book, a runner-up for the annual Caldecott Medal, conferred by the American Library Association on the illustrator of the year's best-illustrated picture book.

Free Fall was the first example of the predominant style of his solo books, which tell a fantastical, often dream-like story without words, only illustrations. Subsequently he won three Caldecott Medals for solo picture books—Tuesday (1991), The Three Pigs (2001), and Flotsam (2006)—and he was one of the runners-up for Sector 7 (1999) and Mr. Wuffles! (2013).

In January 2017, Wiesner had a retrospective art exhibition entitled David Wiesner & the Art of Wordless Storytelling at the Santa Barbara Museum of Art. In the exhibition Wiesner showed his work highlights throughout the years of his career.

== Works ==
=== As writer and illustrator ===
- 1987 Loathsome Dragon, retold by Wiesner and Kim Kahng
- 1988 Free Fall
- 1990 Hurricane
- 1991 Tuesday
- 1992 June 29, 1999
- 1999 Sector 7
- 2001 The Three Pigs
- 2006 Flotsam
- 2010 Art & Max
- 2013 Mr. Wuffles!
- 2017 Fish Girl
- 2018 I Got It!
- 2020 Robobaby

=== As illustrator ===
- 1980 Honest Andrew by Gloria Skurzynski
- 1980 Man from the Sky by Avi
- 1981 Ugly Princess by Nancy Luenn
- 1981 One Bad Thing about Birthdays by David R. Collins
- 1981 Boy who Spoke Chimp by Jane Yolen
- 1982 Owly by Mike Thaler
- 1982 Neptune Rising: Songs and Tales of the Undersea Folk by Jane Yolen
- 1983 Miranty and the Alchemist by Vera Chapman
- 1984 Dark Green Tunnel by Allan W. Eckert
- 1985 Wand: the Return to Mesmeria by Allan W. Eckert
- 1985 E.T., the Storybook of the Green Planet by William Kotzwinkle; based on the film story by Steven Spielberg and Melissa Mathison
- 1986 Kite Flier by Dennis Haseley
- 1988 Firebrat by Nancy Willard
- 1989 The Rainbow People by Laurence Yep
- 1989 The Sorcerer's Apprentice by Marianna Mayer
- 1991 Tongues of Jade by Laurence Yep
- 1994 Night of the Gargoyles by Eve Bunting

=== Other ===
- 1989 Cover for The Glass Salamander by Ann Downer
- 1997 Story and Design for CD-ROM adventure game The Day the World Broke
