= David Macaulay =

British-born American illustrator and writer (born 1946)

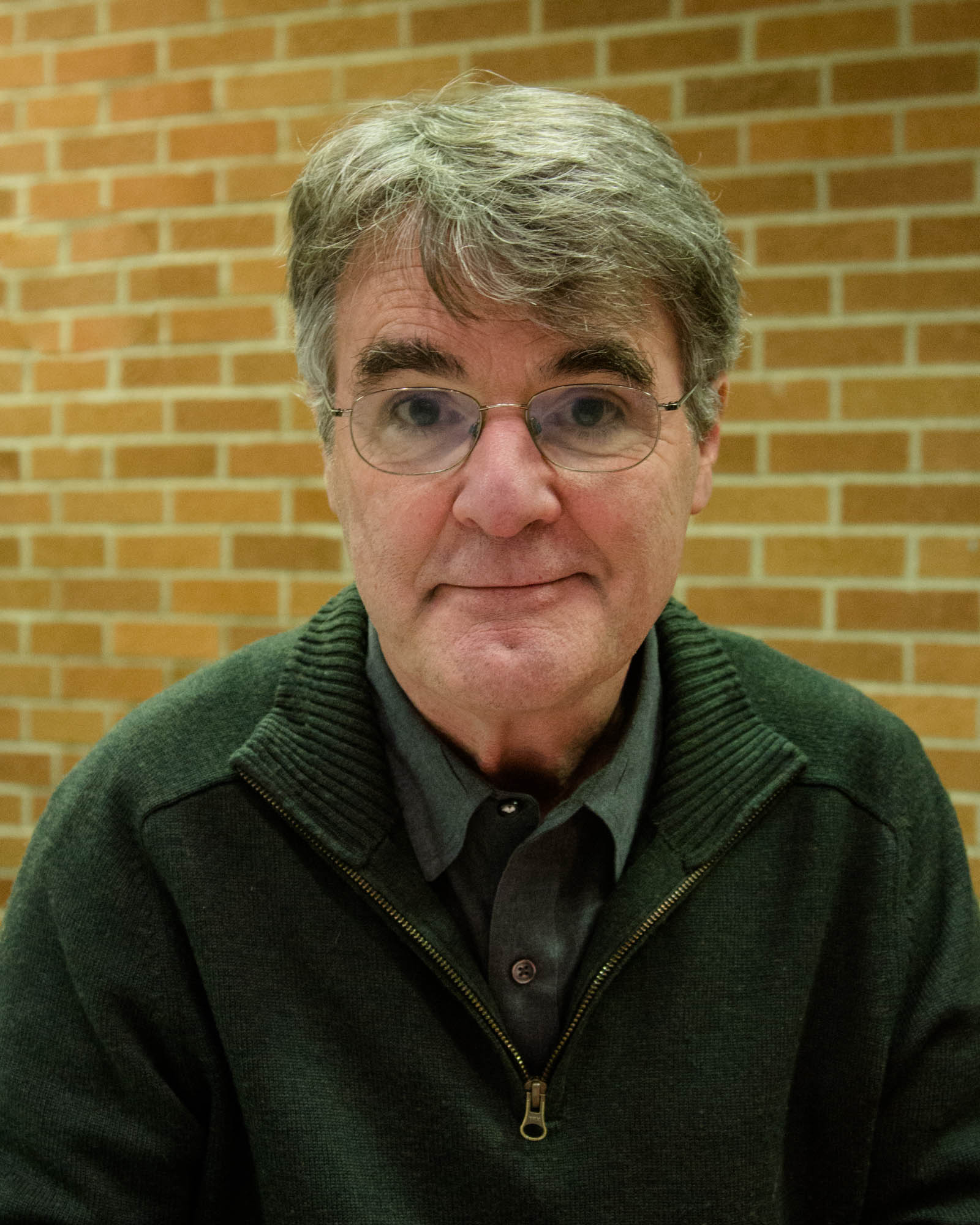
- Macaulay at the University of Findlay's Mazza Museum, November 2012
- Born: December 2, 1946 (age 79); Burton upon Trent, Staffordshire, England
- Education: Rhode Island School of Design (B.A.)
- Occupations: Illustrator, writer
- Writing career
- Genre: Picture books
- Subjects: Architecture, engineering, history
- Notable works: Cathedral; Castle; The Way Things Work; Black and White
- Notable awards: MacArthur Fellows Program; Caldecott Medal; Horn Book Award; Christopher Award; American Institute of Architects Medal; Deutscher Jugendliteraturpreis

David Macaulay (born 2 December 1946) is a British-born American illustrator and writer. His works include Cathedral (1973), The Way Things Work (1988), and its updated revisions The New Way Things Work (1998) and The Way Things Work Now (2016). His illustrations have been featured in nonfiction books combining text and illustrations explaining architecture, design, and engineering, and he has written a number of children's fiction books.

In 2006, Macaulay was a recipient of a MacArthur Fellows Program award and received the Caldecott Medal in 1991 for his book Black and White, published in 1990.

== Early life and education ==
Macaulay was born in Burton upon Trent and grew up in Lancashire, England. At the age of eleven, he immigrated with his family to Bloomfield, New Jersey, US. He had an early fascination with how machines operated and made models and drew illustrations of them.

After graduating from high school in Cumberland, Rhode Island, in 1964, he enrolled in the Rhode Island School of Design (RISD in Providence), where he received a bachelor's degree in architecture. After graduating he decided against pursuing a career in architecture. He spent his fifth year at RISD in the European Honors Program, studying in Rome. He then took jobs as an interior designer, a junior high school teacher, and a teacher at RISD before he began to create books.

== Career ==
=== Literature ===
Macaulay is the author of several books on architecture and design. His first book, Cathedral (1973), was a history, extensively illustrated with pen-and-ink drawings, of the construction of a fictitious but representative Gothic cathedral. This was followed by a series of books of the same type: City (1974), on the construction of Verbonia, a fictitious but typical ancient Roman city; Pyramid (1975), a collection of diagrams and sketches illustrating the construction process of the pyramid monuments to the Egyptian Pharaohs; Castle (1977), on the construction of Aberwyvern castle, a fictitious but typical medieval castle; Mill (1983), on the evolution of New England mills; and Mosque (2003), which depicts the design and construction of an Ottoman-style masjid. The September 11 attacks motivated Macaulay to create Mosque to show how the traditions of major religions have more in common than they have dividing them. Cathedral, City, Pyramid, Castle, and Mill were later adapted into documentaries with animated period drama segments produced by Unicorn Productions, each of which aired sporadically on PBS from 1983 to 1994.

Other books in the series are Underground (1976), which describes the building foundations and support structures (like water and sewer pipes) that underlie a typical city intersection, and Unbuilding (1980), which describes the hypothetical dismantling of the Empire State Building in preparation for re-erection in the Middle East. Macaulay authored a children's book, The Way Things Work (1988, text by Neil Ardley). This was expanded and re-released as The New Way Things Work (1998) and The Way Things Work Now (2016). The Way Things Work is his most commercially successful series and served as the basis for a short-lived educational television program.

His books often display a whimsical humor. Illustrations in The Way Things Work depict cave people and woolly mammoths operating giant-sized versions of the devices he is explaining. Motel of the Mysteries, written in 1979 after the 1976–1979 exhibition of the Tutankhamun relics in the U.S., concerns the discovery by future archaeologists of an American motel and their ingenious interpretation of the building and its contents as a funerary and temple complex. Baaa is set after the human race has somehow gone extinct. Sheep discover artifacts of lost human civilization and attempt to rebuild it. However, the new sheep-inhabited world develops the same side effects of economic disparity, crime, and war. Macaulay considers concealing technology's inner mechanics as a growing problem for society, and aims to fight this trend with his work.

Researching his book The Way We Work, Macaulay took years talking and studying with doctors and researchers, attending medical procedures, and laboriously sketching and drawing. He worked with medical professionals like Lois Smith, a professor at Harvard University and researcher at Children's Hospital Boston, and medical writer Richard Walker to ensure the accuracy of both his words and his illustrations. Anne Gilroy, a clinical anatomist in the departments of surgery and cell biology at the University of Massachusetts Medical School, consulted on the book. She said of Macaulay, "His remarkable curiosity and meticulous research led him into some of the most complicated facets of the human body yet he tells this story with simplicity, ingenuity and humor."

=== Other works ===
A mural designed by Macaulay was painted on a wall adjacent to Interstate 95 in Providence, Rhode Island. It depicted statues of famous Rhode Island citizens like Moses Brown and General Ambrose Burnside with an energetic dog who had knocked over a statue while chasing after a pigeon. It was on display from 2013 but painted over in 2017 because the Rhode Island Department of Transportation could no longer repair it after constant graffiti tagging.

He has collaborated with the Center for Integrated Quantum Materials at Harvard University and the Boston Museum of Science to create illustrations for quantum materials. These aid in explaining visual information to researchers and a wider audience by establishing and using a consistent visual style.

== Awards ==
Macaulay's awards include the MacArthur Fellows Program award (2006); the Caldecott Medal, won for his book Black and White; the Boston Globe–Horn Book Award; the Christopher Award, an American Institute of Architects Medal; the Washington Children's Book Guild Nonfiction Award; the Deutscher Jugendliteraturpreis; the Dutch Silver Slate Pencil Award; and the Bradford Washburn Award, awarded by the Museum of Science in Boston to exemplary contributors to science. He was U.S. nominee for the biennial, international Hans Christian Andersen Award in 1984 and 2002. Macaulay was honored with delivering the May Hill Arbuthnot Honor Lecture in 2008 by the American Library Association.

== Personal life ==
Macaulay lives in Norwich, Vermont, and is a lecturer at nearby Dartmouth College's Thayer School of Engineering.

== Publications ==
- Cathedral: The Story of Its Construction (1973); winner of the 1975 Deutscher Jugendliteraturpreis for children's non-fiction; one of The New York Times ten Best Illustrated Books, 1973; Caldecott Honor Book (1974); Childrens Book Showcase title (1974)
- City: A Story of Roman Planning and Construction (1974)
- Pyramid (1975); winner of the 1976 Boston Globe-Horn Book Award, The Christopher Award and a New York Times Outstanding Book of the Year, 1975
- Underground (1976); a New York Times Outstanding Book of the Year (1976)
- Castle (1977); winner of a 1978 Caldecott honor and the Boston Globe-Horn Book Awards.
- Great Moments in Architecture (1978)
- Motel of the Mysteries (1979)
- Unbuilding (1980)
- Help! Let Me Out! (1982, David Lord Porter (Author), David MacAulay (Illustrator))
- Mill (1983)
- Baaa (1985)
- Why the Chicken Crossed the Road (1987)
- The Way Things Work (1988), text by David Macaulay and Neil Ardley; winner of the 1989 Boston Globe-Horn Book Award, commended by the Association for Library Service to Children (ALSC) as a notable book, 1989
- Black and White (1990); Caldecott Medal Winner (1991)
- Ship (1994)
- Shortcut (1995)
- Rome Antics (1997)
- The New Way Things Work (1998)
- Pinball Science (1998) (CD-ROM video game)
- Building the Book Cathedral (1999)
- Building Big (2000)
- Angelo (2002)
- Mosque (2003)
- The Way We Work (7 October 2008); Honor, 2009 Boston Globe-Horn Book Award
- Built to Last (2010)
- Jet Plane: How It Works (2012)
- Castle: How It Works (2012)
- Toilet: How It Works (2013)
- Eye: How It Works (2013)
- How Machines Work: Zoo Break! (2015)
- The Way Things Work Now (2016)
- Crossing on Time: Steam Engines, Fast Ships, and a Journey to the New World (2019)
- Mammoth Science: The Big Ideas That Explain Our World, Tested by Mammoths (2020)
- Mammoth Maths: Everything You Need to Know About Numbers, Demonstrated by Mammoths (2022)

== Artwork exhibitions ==
- David Macaulay: The Art of Drawing Architecture. The National Building Museum. (June 2007 to May 2008)
- Building Books: The Art of David Macaulay. The Currier Museum of Art. (2009)

== Television ==
- Castle (1983), PBS, host and narrator
- Cathedral (1986), PBS, host and narrator
- Pyramid (1988), PBS, host and narrator
- Roman City (1994), PBS, host and narrator
- Building Big (2000), PBS, host and narrator
- Mill Times (2001), PBS, host and narrator
- The Way Things Work (2001–2002), BBC, 26 episodes, animated and based on the book
